= List of minor planets: 887001–888000 =

The following is a partial list of minor planets, running from minor-planet number 887001 through 888000, inclusive. The primary data for this and other partial lists is based on JPL's "Small-Body Orbital Elements" and data available from the Minor Planet Center. Critical list information is also provided by the MPC, unless otherwise specified from Lowell Observatory. A detailed description of the table's columns and additional sources are given on the main page including a complete list of every page in this series, and a statistical break-up on the dynamical classification of minor planets.

Also see the summary list of all named bodies in numerical and alphabetical order, and the corresponding naming citations for the number range of this particular list. New namings may only be added to this list after official publication, as the preannouncement of names is condemned by the Working Group for Small Bodies Nomenclature of the International Astronomical Union.

| Near-Earth obj. | MBA (inner) | MBA (outer) | Centaur |
| Mars-crosser | MBA (middle) | Jupiter trojan | Trans-Neptunian obj. |
| Unclassified |

== 887001–887100 ==
| Designation | | | Discovery | | | Properties | | Ref |
| Permanent | Provisional | Named after | Date | Site | Discoverer(s) | Category | Diam. | Ref |
|---|---|---|---|---|---|---|---|---|
| 887001 | 2023 GG_{9} | — | April 15, 2023 | Haleakala | Pan-STARRS 2 | · | 2.7 km | MPC · JPL |
| 887002 | 2023 HC_{6} | — | November 21, 2017 | Haleakala | Pan-STARRS 1 | · | 1.4 km | MPC · JPL |
| 887003 | 2023 HV_{14} | — | April 30, 2023 | Haleakala | Pan-STARRS 1 | · | 2.5 km | MPC · JPL |
| 887004 | 2023 HD_{15} | — | April 24, 2023 | Haleakala | Pan-STARRS 2 | · | 1.9 km | MPC · JPL |
| 887005 | 2023 HX_{17} | — | April 30, 2023 | Haleakala | Pan-STARRS 2 | · | 2.1 km | MPC · JPL |
| 887006 | 2023 HN_{20} | — | September 17, 2020 | Haleakala | Pan-STARRS 1 | EUN | 800 m | MPC · JPL |
| 887007 | 2023 HY_{36} | — | October 8, 2019 | Haleakala | Pan-STARRS 1 | · | 2.0 km | MPC · JPL |
| 887008 | 2023 HO_{37} | — | April 21, 2023 | Haleakala | Pan-STARRS 2 | · | 1.9 km | MPC · JPL |
| 887009 | 2023 HF_{38} | — | April 21, 2023 | Mount Lemmon | Mount Lemmon Survey | · | 1.4 km | MPC · JPL |
| 887010 | 2023 JZ_{13} | — | September 3, 2013 | Mount Lemmon | Mount Lemmon Survey | THM | 1.5 km | MPC · JPL |
| 887011 | 2023 JO_{16} | — | May 13, 2023 | Mount Lemmon | Mount Lemmon Survey | T_{j} (2.96) | 980 m | MPC · JPL |
| 887012 | 2023 JS_{20} | — | May 13, 2023 | Haleakala | Pan-STARRS 1 | · | 2.0 km | MPC · JPL |
| 887013 | 2023 JQ_{29} | — | May 12, 2023 | Haleakala | Pan-STARRS 2 | · | 1.9 km | MPC · JPL |
| 887014 | 2023 JF_{31} | — | April 23, 2023 | Haleakala | Pan-STARRS 2 | · | 2.0 km | MPC · JPL |
| 887015 | 2023 JZ_{34} | — | June 2, 2019 | Haleakala | Pan-STARRS 1 | · | 630 m | MPC · JPL |
| 887016 | 2023 KL_{3} | — | March 21, 2017 | Mount Lemmon | Mount Lemmon Survey | · | 2.3 km | MPC · JPL |
| 887017 | 2023 LM_{2} | — | June 14, 2023 | Mount Lemmon | Mount Lemmon Survey | APO | 390 m | MPC · JPL |
| 887018 | 2023 MC_{5} | — | December 10, 2014 | Mount Lemmon | Mount Lemmon Survey | L5 | 8.0 km | MPC · JPL |
| 887019 | 2023 MY_{11} | — | June 22, 2023 | Haleakala | Pan-STARRS 2 | EOS | 1.3 km | MPC · JPL |
| 887020 | 2023 MW_{12} | — | June 27, 2023 | Kitt Peak | Bok NEO Survey | · | 2.3 km | MPC · JPL |
| 887021 | 2023 MV_{15} | — | June 20, 2023 | Haleakala | Pan-STARRS 2 | L5 | 6.8 km | MPC · JPL |
| 887022 | 2023 MQ_{20} | — | June 30, 2023 | Haleakala | Pan-STARRS 1 | L5 | 5.6 km | MPC · JPL |
| 887023 | 2023 NK_{6} | — | August 15, 2017 | Haleakala | Pan-STARRS 1 | · | 2.2 km | MPC · JPL |
| 887024 | 2023 NL_{9} | — | September 15, 2010 | Catalina | CSS | · | 1.0 km | MPC · JPL |
| 887025 | 2023 OD_{10} | — | July 24, 2023 | Haleakala | Pan-STARRS 1 | L5 | 6.1 km | MPC · JPL |
| 887026 | 2023 OK_{54} | — | July 16, 2023 | Haleakala | Pan-STARRS 1 | L5 | 6.0 km | MPC · JPL |
| 887027 | 2023 OY_{54} | — | July 26, 2023 | Haleakala | Pan-STARRS 1 | L5 | 6.3 km | MPC · JPL |
| 887028 | 2023 OC_{55} | — | July 26, 2023 | Haleakala | Pan-STARRS 1 | L5 | 4.9 km | MPC · JPL |
| 887029 | 2023 OQ_{59} | — | July 23, 2023 | Haleakala | Pan-STARRS 1 | L5 | 6.4 km | MPC · JPL |
| 887030 | 2023 QF_{5} | — | August 21, 2023 | Haleakala | Pan-STARRS 2 | APO +1km · PHA | 820 m | MPC · JPL |
| 887031 | 2023 QX_{23} | — | September 9, 2015 | Haleakala | Pan-STARRS 1 | 3:2 | 3.3 km | MPC · JPL |
| 887032 | 2023 QY_{56} | — | August 18, 2023 | Haleakala | Pan-STARRS 1 | L5 | 6.0 km | MPC · JPL |
| 887033 | 2023 QB_{134} | — | August 19, 2023 | Haleakala | Pan-STARRS 2 | L5 | 5.9 km | MPC · JPL |
| 887034 | 2023 RU_{7} | — | September 7, 2023 | Haleakala | Pan-STARRS 1 | L5 | 6.7 km | MPC · JPL |
| 887035 | 2023 RJ_{21} | — | September 10, 2023 | Haleakala | Pan-STARRS 2 | L5 | 5.5 km | MPC · JPL |
| 887036 | 2023 RS_{30} | — | October 17, 2006 | Catalina | CSS | · | 650 m | MPC · JPL |
| 887037 | 2023 RU_{43} | — | October 17, 2013 | Mount Graham | K. Černis, R. P. Boyle | L5 · (17492) | 6.2 km | MPC · JPL |
| 887038 | 2023 RV_{52} | — | September 12, 2023 | Haleakala | Pan-STARRS 2 | · | 2.5 km | MPC · JPL |
| 887039 | 2023 RM_{79} | — | September 14, 2023 | Haleakala | Pan-STARRS 2 | · | 1.3 km | MPC · JPL |
| 887040 | 2023 RT_{111} | — | September 15, 2023 | Haleakala | Pan-STARRS 2 | · | 1.3 km | MPC · JPL |
| 887041 | 2023 RT_{126} | — | September 15, 1998 | Kitt Peak | Spacewatch | BRG | 990 m | MPC · JPL |
| 887042 | 2023 SC_{18} | — | October 1, 2010 | Mount Lemmon | Mount Lemmon Survey | · | 1.0 km | MPC · JPL |
| 887043 | 2023 SQ_{35} | — | September 19, 2023 | Haleakala | Pan-STARRS 2 | · | 1.7 km | MPC · JPL |
| 887044 | 2023 SZ_{67} | — | December 28, 2011 | Kitt Peak | Spacewatch | (5) | 1 km | MPC · JPL |
| 887045 | 2023 TU_{16} | — | January 6, 2019 | Haleakala | Pan-STARRS 1 | · | 2.0 km | MPC · JPL |
| 887046 | 2023 TZ_{18} | — | August 27, 2016 | Haleakala | Pan-STARRS 1 | · | 440 m | MPC · JPL |
| 887047 | 2023 TW_{55} | — | September 22, 2017 | Haleakala | Pan-STARRS 1 | · | 1.7 km | MPC · JPL |
| 887048 | 2023 TM_{106} | — | November 25, 2005 | Kitt Peak | Spacewatch | · | 1.0 km | MPC · JPL |
| 887049 | 2023 TP_{138} | — | December 6, 2013 | Haleakala | Pan-STARRS 1 | · | 1.2 km | MPC · JPL |
| 887050 | 2023 UK_{16} | — | December 31, 2007 | Mount Lemmon | Mount Lemmon Survey | · | 930 m | MPC · JPL |
| 887051 | 2024 HJ_{5} | — | April 19, 2024 | Haleakala | Pan-STARRS 1 | · | 1.2 km | MPC · JPL |
| 887052 | 2024 HK_{5} | — | January 23, 2015 | Haleakala | Pan-STARRS 1 | · | 880 m | MPC · JPL |
| 887053 | 2024 HJ_{14} | — | September 21, 2011 | Haleakala | Pan-STARRS 1 | · | 1.7 km | MPC · JPL |
| 887054 | 2024 JU_{27} | — | August 8, 2016 | Haleakala | Pan-STARRS 1 | · | 1.0 km | MPC · JPL |
| 887055 | 2024 JB_{30} | — | October 10, 2015 | Haleakala | Pan-STARRS 1 | · | 1.1 km | MPC · JPL |
| 887056 | 2024 JJ_{34} | — | January 20, 2015 | Haleakala | Pan-STARRS 1 | · | 1.0 km | MPC · JPL |
| 887057 | 2024 JA_{42} | — | May 2, 2024 | Haleakala | Pan-STARRS 1 | critical | 2.5 km | MPC · JPL |
| 887058 | 2024 JG_{64} | — | May 7, 2024 | Haleakala | Pan-STARRS 2 | · | 1.3 km | MPC · JPL |
| 887059 | 2024 KE_{6} | — | October 7, 2020 | Mount Lemmon | Mount Lemmon Survey | · | 1.4 km | MPC · JPL |
| 887060 | 2024 LR_{4} | — | September 29, 2019 | Mount Lemmon | Mount Lemmon Survey | · | 2.5 km | MPC · JPL |
| 887061 | 2024 LU_{13} | — | June 30, 2019 | Haleakala | Pan-STARRS 1 | · | 1.4 km | MPC · JPL |
| 887062 | 2024 MV_{6} | — | June 19, 2024 | Haleakala | Pan-STARRS 2 | · | 1.3 km | MPC · JPL |
| 887063 | 2024 MF_{8} | — | June 16, 2024 | Haleakala | Pan-STARRS 2 | · | 2.1 km | MPC · JPL |
| 887064 | 2024 NV_{5} | — | July 9, 2024 | Haleakala | Pan-STARRS 2 | · | 2.3 km | MPC · JPL |
| 887065 | 2024 OR | — | July 27, 2024 | Haleakala | Pan-STARRS 1 | · | 80 km | MPC · JPL |
| 887066 | 2024 OV_{8} | — | July 30, 2024 | Haleakala | Pan-STARRS 2 | · | 1.5 km | MPC · JPL |
| 887067 | 2024 OH_{10} | — | July 29, 2024 | Haleakala | Pan-STARRS 2 | · | 1.3 km | MPC · JPL |
| 887068 | 2024 OS_{14} | — | July 29, 2024 | Haleakala | Pan-STARRS 2 | · | 1.4 km | MPC · JPL |
| 887069 | 2024 PH_{10} | — | August 8, 2024 | Haleakala | Pan-STARRS 2 | · | 1.1 km | MPC · JPL |
| 887070 | 2024 PN_{22} | — | November 23, 2020 | Mount Lemmon | Mount Lemmon Survey | · | 1.2 km | MPC · JPL |
| 887071 | 2024 PW_{23} | — | August 8, 2024 | Haleakala | Pan-STARRS 2 | · | 2.1 km | MPC · JPL |
| 887072 | 2024 PF_{24} | — | August 8, 2024 | Haleakala | Pan-STARRS 2 | L5 | 6.8 km | MPC · JPL |
| 887073 | 2024 QA_{6} | — | August 31, 2024 | Haleakala | Pan-STARRS 1 | · | 1.8 km | MPC · JPL |
| 887074 | 2024 QZ_{6} | — | November 17, 2014 | Haleakala | Pan-STARRS 1 | L5 | 7.7 km | MPC · JPL |
| 887075 | 2024 QN_{22} | — | October 24, 2013 | Kitt Peak | Spacewatch | L5 | 5.7 km | MPC · JPL |
| 887076 | 2024 QR_{22} | — | August 16, 2024 | Haleakala | Pan-STARRS 1 | L5 | 6.3 km | MPC · JPL |
| 887077 | 2024 QY_{23} | — | March 4, 2014 | Cerro Tololo | High Cadence Transient Survey | · | 770 m | MPC · JPL |
| 887078 | 2024 RC_{17} | — | February 7, 2021 | Haleakala | Pan-STARRS 1 | · | 2.2 km | MPC · JPL |
| 887079 | 2024 RU_{33} | — | August 11, 2018 | Haleakala | Pan-STARRS 1 | · | 2.0 km | MPC · JPL |
| 887080 | 2024 RT_{36} | — | April 18, 2015 | Cerro Tololo | DECam | · | 2.3 km | MPC · JPL |
| 887081 | 2024 RS_{45} | — | September 3, 2024 | Haleakala | Pan-STARRS 1 | · | 2.6 km | MPC · JPL |
| 887082 | 2024 RZ_{47} | — | August 14, 2018 | XuYi | PMO NEO Survey Program | · | 2.5 km | MPC · JPL |
| 887083 | 2024 RP_{48} | — | September 10, 2024 | Haleakala | Pan-STARRS 2 | L5 | 5.5 km | MPC · JPL |
| 887084 | 2024 RA_{64} | — | August 26, 2012 | Haleakala | Pan-STARRS 1 | · | 2.4 km | MPC · JPL |
| 887085 | 2024 RQ_{74} | — | September 6, 2023 | Mount Lemmon | Mount Lemmon Survey | L5 | 6.1 km | MPC · JPL |
| 887086 | 2024 RT_{101} | — | October 15, 2012 | Haleakala | Pan-STARRS 1 | L5 | 5.9 km | MPC · JPL |
| 887087 | 2024 RP_{104} | — | September 8, 2024 | Haleakala | Pan-STARRS 2 | · | 2.0 km | MPC · JPL |
| 887088 | 2024 RT_{159} | — | October 13, 2013 | Oukaïmeden | C. Rinner | · | 2.1 km | MPC · JPL |
| 887089 | 2024 RB_{201} | — | January 28, 2017 | Haleakala | Pan-STARRS 1 | L5 | 6.4 km | MPC · JPL |
| 887090 | 2024 SQ_{7} | — | December 2, 2019 | Mount Lemmon | Mount Lemmon Survey | · | 2.1 km | MPC · JPL |
| 887091 | 2024 SB_{19} | — | June 24, 2018 | Haleakala | Pan-STARRS 1 | critical | 1.9 km | MPC · JPL |
| 887092 | 2024 SH_{25} | — | September 26, 2024 | Haleakala | Pan-STARRS 2 | · | 2.0 km | MPC · JPL |
| 887093 | 2024 SM_{32} | — | March 19, 2013 | Haleakala | Pan-STARRS 1 | · | 1.1 km | MPC · JPL |
| 887094 | 2024 SN_{33} | — | August 2, 2011 | Haleakala | Pan-STARRS 1 | L5 | 5.6 km | MPC · JPL |
| 887095 | 2024 TT_{7} | — | October 14, 2007 | Mount Lemmon | Mount Lemmon Survey | · | 1.6 km | MPC · JPL |
| 887096 | 2025 BC_{13} | — | November 18, 2020 | Mount Lemmon | Mount Lemmon Survey | · | 620 m | MPC · JPL |
| 887097 | 2025 HU_{5} | — | May 7, 2014 | Haleakala | Pan-STARRS 1 | · | 1.6 km | MPC · JPL |
| 887098 | 2025 HQ_{27} | — | January 3, 2019 | Haleakala | Pan-STARRS 1 | · | 1.3 km | MPC · JPL |
| 887099 | 2025 NO_{2} | — | July 7, 2025 | WFST, Lenghu | WFST, Lenghu | critical | 750 m | MPC · JPL |
| 887100 | 2025 NZ_{2} | — | July 6, 2025 | Kitt Peak | Bok NEO Survey | critical | 1.7 km | MPC · JPL |

== 887101–887200 ==
back to top

| Designation | | | Discovery | | | Properties | | Ref |
| Permanent | Provisional | Named after | Date | Site | Discoverer(s) | Category | Diam. | Ref |
|---|---|---|---|---|---|---|---|---|
| 887101 | 2025 OP_{22} | — | July 30, 2025 | La Palma-Liverpool | Romanov, F. D. | · | 770 m | MPC · JPL |
| 887102 | 2025 QW_{50} | — | August 19, 2025 | Haleakala | Pan-STARRS 1 | T_{j} (2.96) | 10 km | MPC · JPL |
| 887103 | 2025 RB_{12} | — | November 5, 2016 | Haleakala | Pan-STARRS 1 | · | 1.3 km | MPC · JPL |
| 887104 | 1993 TQ_{4} | — | October 8, 1993 | Kitt Peak | Spacewatch | PHO | 690 m | MPC · JPL |
| 887105 | 1994 AS_{8} | — | January 8, 1994 | Kitt Peak | Spacewatch | · | 1.0 km | MPC · JPL |
| 887106 | 1994 SF_{13} | — | September 28, 1994 | Kitt Peak | Spacewatch | · | 940 m | MPC · JPL |
| 887107 | 1995 CR_{2} | — | February 1, 1995 | Kitt Peak | Spacewatch | · | 490 m | MPC · JPL |
| 887108 | 1995 FT_{10} | — | March 27, 1995 | Kitt Peak | Spacewatch | · | 440 m | MPC · JPL |
| 887109 | 1995 SZ_{65} | — | September 17, 1995 | Kitt Peak | Spacewatch | · | 440 m | MPC · JPL |
| 887110 | 1995 SC_{85} | — | September 25, 1995 | Kitt Peak | Spacewatch | · | 920 m | MPC · JPL |
| 887111 | 1995 TO_{11} | — | October 15, 1995 | Kitt Peak | Spacewatch | · | 790 m | MPC · JPL |
| 887112 | 1995 UW_{27} | — | October 20, 1995 | Kitt Peak | Spacewatch | (5) | 830 m | MPC · JPL |
| 887113 | 1995 WD_{20} | — | November 17, 1995 | Kitt Peak | Spacewatch | · | 700 m | MPC · JPL |
| 887114 | 1995 WH_{30} | — | November 19, 1995 | Kitt Peak | Spacewatch | · | 860 m | MPC · JPL |
| 887115 | 1996 BM_{11} | — | January 24, 1996 | Kitt Peak | Spacewatch | · | 860 m | MPC · JPL |
| 887116 | 1996 RP_{14} | — | September 11, 1996 | Kitt Peak | Spacewatch | · | 2.0 km | MPC · JPL |
| 887117 | 1996 VF_{31} | — | November 3, 1996 | Kitt Peak | Spacewatch | · | 710 m | MPC · JPL |
| 887118 | 1998 DV_{38} | — | April 1, 2003 | Apache Point | SDSS | · | 1.3 km | MPC · JPL |
| 887119 | 1998 RK_{10} | — | September 13, 1998 | Kitt Peak | Spacewatch | · | 750 m | MPC · JPL |
| 887120 | 1998 SL_{92} | — | September 26, 1998 | Socorro | LINEAR | T_{j} (2.38) | 5.7 km | MPC · JPL |
| 887121 | 1998 SN_{181} | — | September 19, 1998 | Apache Point | SDSS | · | 1.1 km | MPC · JPL |
| 887122 | 1998 TY_{19} | — | October 13, 1998 | Kitt Peak | Spacewatch | H | 340 m | MPC · JPL |
| 887123 | 1999 AO_{36} | — | January 12, 1999 | Mauna Kea | C. Veillet, J. Anderson | · | 650 m | MPC · JPL |
| 887124 | 1999 FZ_{99} | — | April 15, 2012 | Haleakala | Pan-STARRS 1 | · | 470 m | MPC · JPL |
| 887125 | 1999 TP_{45} | — | October 3, 1999 | Kitt Peak | Spacewatch | · | 1.1 km | MPC · JPL |
| 887126 | 1999 TB_{47} | — | October 4, 1999 | Kitt Peak | Spacewatch | · | 450 m | MPC · JPL |
| 887127 | 1999 TM_{302} | — | October 4, 1999 | Kitt Peak | Spacewatch | · | 720 m | MPC · JPL |
| 887128 | 1999 TU_{314} | — | October 8, 1999 | Kitt Peak | Spacewatch | H | 300 m | MPC · JPL |
| 887129 | 1999 VV_{15} | — | November 2, 1999 | Kitt Peak | Spacewatch | · | 420 m | MPC · JPL |
| 887130 | 2000 CM_{150} | — | January 12, 2011 | Mount Lemmon | Mount Lemmon Survey | MAS | 460 m | MPC · JPL |
| 887131 | 2000 CD_{152} | — | November 27, 2006 | Kitt Peak | Spacewatch | MAS | 500 m | MPC · JPL |
| 887132 | 2000 CT_{154} | — | February 7, 2011 | Mount Lemmon | Mount Lemmon Survey | NYS | 750 m | MPC · JPL |
| 887133 | 2000 CY_{155} | — | February 12, 2000 | Apache Point | SDSS | HNS | 800 m | MPC · JPL |
| 887134 | 2000 DT_{90} | — | January 30, 2000 | Kitt Peak | Spacewatch | · | 900 m | MPC · JPL |
| 887135 | 2000 EL_{7} | — | March 3, 2000 | Kitt Peak | Spacewatch | · | 860 m | MPC · JPL |
| 887136 | 2000 EQ_{8} | — | March 3, 2000 | Socorro | LINEAR | · | 1.3 km | MPC · JPL |
| 887137 | 2000 EK_{177} | — | March 3, 2000 | Kitt Peak | Spacewatch | · | 690 m | MPC · JPL |
| 887138 | 2000 GK_{119} | — | April 3, 2000 | Kitt Peak | Spacewatch | · | 1.9 km | MPC · JPL |
| 887139 | 2000 JZ_{66} | — | April 5, 2000 | Socorro | LINEAR | · | 680 m | MPC · JPL |
| 887140 | 2000 ON_{61} | — | July 29, 2000 | Cerro Tololo | Deep Ecliptic Survey | · | 1.0 km | MPC · JPL |
| 887141 | 2000 OU_{63} | — | July 31, 2000 | Cerro Tololo | Deep Ecliptic Survey | · | 940 m | MPC · JPL |
| 887142 | 2000 QH_{234} | — | August 25, 2000 | Cerro Tololo | Deep Ecliptic Survey | GAL | 890 m | MPC · JPL |
| 887143 | 2000 QZ_{235} | — | August 26, 2000 | Cerro Tololo | Deep Ecliptic Survey | · | 720 m | MPC · JPL |
| 887144 | 2000 QZ_{256} | — | September 27, 2000 | Kitt Peak | Spacewatch | · | 620 m | MPC · JPL |
| 887145 | 2000 QZ_{257} | — | July 5, 2016 | Haleakala | Pan-STARRS 1 | H | 290 m | MPC · JPL |
| 887146 | 2000 RH_{110} | — | April 3, 2011 | Haleakala | Pan-STARRS 1 | · | 830 m | MPC · JPL |
| 887147 | 2000 SO_{44} | — | September 27, 2000 | Socorro | LINEAR | · | 880 m | MPC · JPL |
| 887148 | 2000 SX_{324} | — | September 28, 2000 | Kitt Peak | Spacewatch | · | 710 m | MPC · JPL |
| 887149 | 2000 SL_{386} | — | July 13, 2016 | Haleakala | Pan-STARRS 1 | · | 710 m | MPC · JPL |
| 887150 | 2000 SX_{386} | — | September 28, 2000 | Kitt Peak | Spacewatch | · | 720 m | MPC · JPL |
| 887151 | 2000 UT_{115} | — | November 8, 2013 | Kitt Peak | Spacewatch | · | 790 m | MPC · JPL |
| 887152 | 2000 WV_{2} | — | November 19, 2000 | Socorro | LINEAR | PHO | 830 m | MPC · JPL |
| 887153 | 2000 WJ_{190} | — | November 19, 2000 | Kitt Peak | Spacewatch | (5) | 850 m | MPC · JPL |
| 887154 | 2001 DP_{96} | — | February 17, 2001 | Kitt Peak | Spacewatch | · | 670 m | MPC · JPL |
| 887155 | 2001 DT_{118} | — | January 4, 2016 | Haleakala | Pan-STARRS 1 | · | 1.4 km | MPC · JPL |
| 887156 | 2001 DA_{119} | — | March 14, 2012 | Kitt Peak | Spacewatch | ERI | 930 m | MPC · JPL |
| 887157 | 2001 FK_{241} | — | March 29, 2001 | Kitt Peak | SKADS | · | 1.5 km | MPC · JPL |
| 887158 | 2001 FZ_{246} | — | March 19, 2001 | Apache Point | SDSS | · | 960 m | MPC · JPL |
| 887159 | 2001 HP_{70} | — | February 18, 2008 | Mount Lemmon | Mount Lemmon Survey | · | 700 m | MPC · JPL |
| 887160 | 2001 KF_{85} | — | April 3, 2008 | Mount Lemmon | Mount Lemmon Survey | · | 680 m | MPC · JPL |
| 887161 | 2001 KO_{88} | — | November 14, 2014 | Kitt Peak | Spacewatch | · | 1.5 km | MPC · JPL |
| 887162 | 2001 QX_{339} | — | August 24, 2001 | Kitt Peak | Spacewatch | · | 1.9 km | MPC · JPL |
| 887163 | 2001 RJ_{157} | — | September 29, 2010 | Mount Lemmon | Mount Lemmon Survey | · | 1.2 km | MPC · JPL |
| 887164 | 2001 RO_{157} | — | October 1, 2005 | Kitt Peak | Spacewatch | · | 950 m | MPC · JPL |
| 887165 | 2001 ST_{362} | — | June 20, 2013 | Haleakala | Pan-STARRS 1 | EUN | 860 m | MPC · JPL |
| 887166 | 2001 ST_{363} | — | September 22, 2001 | Kitt Peak | Spacewatch | · | 930 m | MPC · JPL |
| 887167 | 2001 ST_{364} | — | September 18, 2001 | Kitt Peak | Spacewatch | · | 750 m | MPC · JPL |
| 887168 | 2001 SU_{364} | — | September 21, 2001 | Apache Point | SDSS | · | 1.1 km | MPC · JPL |
| 887169 | 2001 TP_{265} | — | September 25, 2011 | Haleakala | Pan-STARRS 1 | · | 610 m | MPC · JPL |
| 887170 | 2001 VB_{137} | — | January 3, 2009 | Mount Lemmon | Mount Lemmon Survey | · | 390 m | MPC · JPL |
| 887171 | 2001 YM_{164} | — | November 28, 2014 | Haleakala | Pan-STARRS 1 | H | 310 m | MPC · JPL |
| 887172 | 2002 AL_{215} | — | November 10, 2010 | Kitt Peak | Spacewatch | · | 1.2 km | MPC · JPL |
| 887173 | 2002 BB_{34} | — | December 30, 2013 | Kitt Peak | Spacewatch | · | 920 m | MPC · JPL |
| 887174 | 2002 CG_{44} | — | February 10, 2002 | Socorro | LINEAR | H | 360 m | MPC · JPL |
| 887175 | 2002 CG_{58} | — | February 8, 2002 | Kitt Peak | Spacewatch | H | 310 m | MPC · JPL |
| 887176 | 2002 CX_{228} | — | February 7, 2002 | Kitt Peak | Spacewatch | · | 900 m | MPC · JPL |
| 887177 | 2002 CT_{322} | — | December 10, 2014 | Haleakala | Pan-STARRS 1 | H | 310 m | MPC · JPL |
| 887178 | 2002 CV_{324} | — | January 11, 2010 | Kitt Peak | Spacewatch | H | 330 m | MPC · JPL |
| 887179 | 2002 CT_{325} | — | February 7, 2002 | Kitt Peak | Deep Ecliptic Survey | · | 750 m | MPC · JPL |
| 887180 | 2002 EA_{169} | — | March 14, 2016 | Mount Lemmon | Mount Lemmon Survey | · | 580 m | MPC · JPL |
| 887181 | 2002 EC_{173} | — | March 10, 2002 | Kitt Peak | Spacewatch | · | 800 m | MPC · JPL |
| 887182 | 2002 GH_{189} | — | April 27, 2009 | Mount Lemmon | Mount Lemmon Survey | · | 540 m | MPC · JPL |
| 887183 | 2002 GW_{194} | — | May 4, 2009 | Mount Lemmon | Mount Lemmon Survey | · | 630 m | MPC · JPL |
| 887184 | 2002 GD_{195} | — | February 27, 2014 | Haleakala | Pan-STARRS 1 | · | 700 m | MPC · JPL |
| 887185 | 2002 NH_{80} | — | July 3, 2002 | Palomar | NEAT | · | 550 m | MPC · JPL |
| 887186 | 2002 OT_{38} | — | July 17, 2002 | Palomar | NEAT | · | 560 m | MPC · JPL |
| 887187 | 2002 PQ_{204} | — | September 27, 2011 | Mount Lemmon | Mount Lemmon Survey | · | 1.2 km | MPC · JPL |
| 887188 | 2002 PS_{205} | — | March 15, 2012 | Kitt Peak | Spacewatch | · | 660 m | MPC · JPL |
| 887189 | 2002 RO_{289} | — | September 1, 2002 | Palomar | NEAT | · | 590 m | MPC · JPL |
| 887190 | 2002 RQ_{294} | — | October 3, 2002 | Palomar | NEAT | · | 1.3 km | MPC · JPL |
| 887191 | 2002 SM_{74} | — | September 26, 2002 | Palomar | NEAT | · | 450 m | MPC · JPL |
| 887192 | 2002 VY_{150} | — | January 27, 2011 | Mount Lemmon | Mount Lemmon Survey | NYS | 660 m | MPC · JPL |
| 887193 | 2002 XR_{122} | — | July 8, 2014 | Haleakala | Pan-STARRS 1 | · | 1.1 km | MPC · JPL |
| 887194 | 2002 YT_{2} | — | December 11, 2002 | Socorro | LINEAR | · | 850 m | MPC · JPL |
| 887195 | 2003 AJ_{42} | — | January 7, 2003 | Socorro | LINEAR | · | 1.1 km | MPC · JPL |
| 887196 | 2003 BX_{21} | — | January 8, 2003 | Socorro | LINEAR | · | 1.1 km | MPC · JPL |
| 887197 | 2003 BD_{43} | — | January 28, 2003 | Mount Graham | Ryan, W. | · | 810 m | MPC · JPL |
| 887198 | 2003 BQ_{99} | — | January 31, 2003 | Anderson Mesa | LONEOS | · | 610 m | MPC · JPL |
| 887199 | 2003 BT_{103} | — | January 25, 2003 | Apache Point | SDSS | · | 700 m | MPC · JPL |
| 887200 | 2003 BY_{103} | — | January 16, 2003 | Palomar | NEAT | T_{j} (2.97) | 3.3 km | MPC · JPL |

== 887201–887300 ==
back to top

| Designation | | | Discovery | | | Properties | | Ref |
| Permanent | Provisional | Named after | Date | Site | Discoverer(s) | Category | Diam. | Ref |
|---|---|---|---|---|---|---|---|---|
| 887201 | 2003 ER_{64} | — | March 11, 2003 | Kitt Peak | Spacewatch | · | 530 m | MPC · JPL |
| 887202 | 2003 FU_{135} | — | February 19, 2012 | Kitt Peak | Spacewatch | · | 1.4 km | MPC · JPL |
| 887203 | 2003 FZ_{136} | — | April 12, 2013 | Haleakala | Pan-STARRS 1 | · | 490 m | MPC · JPL |
| 887204 | 2003 FR_{137} | — | March 11, 2007 | Mount Lemmon | Mount Lemmon Survey | MAS | 660 m | MPC · JPL |
| 887205 | 2003 GC_{10} | — | April 2, 2003 | Haleakala | NEAT | · | 560 m | MPC · JPL |
| 887206 | 2003 GE_{61} | — | February 25, 2012 | Mount Lemmon | Mount Lemmon Survey | · | 1.2 km | MPC · JPL |
| 887207 | 2003 GC_{64} | — | April 9, 2003 | Palomar | NEAT | · | 890 m | MPC · JPL |
| 887208 | 2003 GA_{65} | — | April 11, 2003 | Kitt Peak | Spacewatch | · | 710 m | MPC · JPL |
| 887209 | 2003 GR_{66} | — | April 8, 2003 | Palomar | NEAT | · | 2.3 km | MPC · JPL |
| 887210 | 2003 GJ_{67} | — | April 4, 2003 | Kitt Peak | Spacewatch | (895) | 2.5 km | MPC · JPL |
| 887211 | 2003 HJ_{19} | — | April 26, 2003 | Kitt Peak | Spacewatch | · | 1.4 km | MPC · JPL |
| 887212 | 2003 HV_{23} | — | April 24, 2003 | Kitt Peak | Spacewatch | T_{j} (2.97) | 2.3 km | MPC · JPL |
| 887213 | 2003 HY_{23} | — | March 26, 2003 | Kitt Peak | Spacewatch | THB | 1.9 km | MPC · JPL |
| 887214 | 2003 HL_{55} | — | April 25, 2003 | Campo Imperatore | CINEOS | · | 1.7 km | MPC · JPL |
| 887215 | 2003 HC_{62} | — | April 25, 2003 | Kitt Peak | Spacewatch | · | 1.5 km | MPC · JPL |
| 887216 | 2003 HH_{64} | — | February 8, 2013 | Kitt Peak | Spacewatch | H | 330 m | MPC · JPL |
| 887217 | 2003 HJ_{66} | — | April 25, 2003 | Kitt Peak | Spacewatch | · | 680 m | MPC · JPL |
| 887218 | 2003 LE_{5} | — | April 26, 2003 | Kitt Peak | Spacewatch | · | 490 m | MPC · JPL |
| 887219 | 2003 NB_{15} | — | October 29, 2017 | Haleakala | Pan-STARRS 1 | H | 390 m | MPC · JPL |
| 887220 | 2003 QH_{124} | — | August 24, 2003 | Cerro Tololo | Deep Ecliptic Survey | · | 1.2 km | MPC · JPL |
| 887221 | 2003 SC_{9} | — | September 17, 2003 | Kitt Peak | Spacewatch | · | 820 m | MPC · JPL |
| 887222 | 2003 SS_{16} | — | September 17, 2003 | Kitt Peak | Spacewatch | · | 1.3 km | MPC · JPL |
| 887223 | 2003 SW_{18} | — | September 16, 2003 | Kitt Peak | Spacewatch | (1547) | 980 m | MPC · JPL |
| 887224 | 2003 SR_{53} | — | September 16, 2003 | Kitt Peak | Spacewatch | · | 960 m | MPC · JPL |
| 887225 | 2003 SR_{191} | — | September 19, 2003 | Kitt Peak | Spacewatch | · | 1.6 km | MPC · JPL |
| 887226 | 2003 SX_{268} | — | September 30, 2003 | Kitt Peak | Spacewatch | HNS | 590 m | MPC · JPL |
| 887227 | 2003 SV_{341} | — | August 23, 2003 | Palomar | NEAT | · | 1.0 km | MPC · JPL |
| 887228 | 2003 SS_{348} | — | September 18, 2003 | Kitt Peak | Spacewatch | · | 340 m | MPC · JPL |
| 887229 | 2003 SW_{348} | — | September 18, 2003 | Kitt Peak | Spacewatch | (1547) | 990 m | MPC · JPL |
| 887230 | 2003 SD_{361} | — | September 22, 2003 | Kitt Peak | Spacewatch | · | 1.6 km | MPC · JPL |
| 887231 | 2003 SB_{370} | — | September 26, 2003 | Apache Point | SDSS | · | 1.4 km | MPC · JPL |
| 887232 | 2003 SC_{379} | — | September 26, 2003 | Apache Point | SDSS | · | 1.3 km | MPC · JPL |
| 887233 | 2003 SF_{386} | — | October 2, 2003 | Kitt Peak | Spacewatch | · | 590 m | MPC · JPL |
| 887234 | 2003 SH_{392} | — | September 26, 2003 | Apache Point | SDSS | · | 2.1 km | MPC · JPL |
| 887235 | 2003 SF_{398} | — | September 26, 2003 | Apache Point | SDSS | · | 1.0 km | MPC · JPL |
| 887236 | 2003 SD_{403} | — | September 16, 2003 | Kitt Peak | Spacewatch | NYS | 550 m | MPC · JPL |
| 887237 | 2003 SK_{447} | — | April 24, 2012 | Haleakala | Pan-STARRS 1 | · | 1.4 km | MPC · JPL |
| 887238 | 2003 SH_{449} | — | September 30, 2003 | Kitt Peak | Spacewatch | · | 590 m | MPC · JPL |
| 887239 | 2003 SL_{453} | — | July 23, 2015 | Haleakala | Pan-STARRS 1 | · | 620 m | MPC · JPL |
| 887240 | 2003 SH_{455} | — | September 28, 2003 | Kitt Peak | Spacewatch | NYS | 820 m | MPC · JPL |
| 887241 | 2003 SM_{455} | — | October 3, 2014 | Mount Lemmon | Mount Lemmon Survey | · | 1.6 km | MPC · JPL |
| 887242 | 2003 SA_{456} | — | January 12, 2018 | Mount Lemmon | Mount Lemmon Survey | H | 370 m | MPC · JPL |
| 887243 | 2003 ST_{459} | — | December 3, 2007 | Kitt Peak | Spacewatch | · | 700 m | MPC · JPL |
| 887244 | 2003 SD_{460} | — | January 16, 2018 | Haleakala | Pan-STARRS 1 | H | 310 m | MPC · JPL |
| 887245 | 2003 SH_{471} | — | September 16, 2003 | Kitt Peak | Spacewatch | NYS | 520 m | MPC · JPL |
| 887246 | 2003 SY_{471} | — | September 21, 2003 | Kitt Peak | Spacewatch | · | 870 m | MPC · JPL |
| 887247 | 2003 SE_{474} | — | September 28, 2003 | Kitt Peak | Spacewatch | MAS | 460 m | MPC · JPL |
| 887248 | 2003 SS_{474} | — | September 21, 2003 | Kitt Peak | Spacewatch | · | 520 m | MPC · JPL |
| 887249 | 2003 TF_{31} | — | October 1, 2003 | Kitt Peak | Spacewatch | · | 1.4 km | MPC · JPL |
| 887250 | 2003 UM_{289} | — | October 24, 2003 | Kitt Peak | Spacewatch | · | 930 m | MPC · JPL |
| 887251 | 2003 UQ_{309} | — | October 20, 2003 | Kitt Peak | Spacewatch | · | 1.4 km | MPC · JPL |
| 887252 | 2003 UT_{349} | — | October 19, 2003 | Apache Point | SDSS | · | 1.7 km | MPC · JPL |
| 887253 | 2003 UO_{350} | — | October 19, 2003 | Apache Point | SDSS | 3:2 | 3.5 km | MPC · JPL |
| 887254 | 2003 UJ_{386} | — | October 22, 2003 | Apache Point | SDSS | AEO | 730 m | MPC · JPL |
| 887255 | 2003 UO_{403} | — | October 18, 2003 | Kitt Peak | Spacewatch | · | 800 m | MPC · JPL |
| 887256 | 2003 UX_{406} | — | October 23, 2003 | Apache Point | SDSS | · | 1.2 km | MPC · JPL |
| 887257 | 2003 UX_{409} | — | October 23, 2003 | Apache Point | SDSS | · | 1.5 km | MPC · JPL |
| 887258 | 2003 UM_{411} | — | October 23, 2003 | Apache Point | SDSS | · | 660 m | MPC · JPL |
| 887259 | 2003 US_{431} | — | October 21, 2003 | Kitt Peak | Spacewatch | (1547) | 730 m | MPC · JPL |
| 887260 | 2003 UV_{436} | — | March 6, 2016 | Haleakala | Pan-STARRS 1 | · | 780 m | MPC · JPL |
| 887261 | 2003 UJ_{440} | — | July 7, 2014 | Haleakala | Pan-STARRS 1 | · | 790 m | MPC · JPL |
| 887262 | 2003 UT_{441} | — | October 22, 2003 | Apache Point | SDSS | · | 450 m | MPC · JPL |
| 887263 | 2003 UQ_{442} | — | October 22, 2017 | Haleakala | Pan-STARRS 1 | V | 420 m | MPC · JPL |
| 887264 | 2003 UF_{443} | — | November 21, 2003 | Kitt Peak | Spacewatch | · | 1.2 km | MPC · JPL |
| 887265 | 2003 UQ_{447} | — | October 23, 2003 | Kitt Peak | Spacewatch | · | 850 m | MPC · JPL |
| 887266 | 2003 UL_{450} | — | October 23, 2003 | Kitt Peak | Spacewatch | · | 800 m | MPC · JPL |
| 887267 | 2003 WR_{50} | — | November 19, 2003 | Kitt Peak | Spacewatch | · | 1.7 km | MPC · JPL |
| 887268 | 2003 WD_{145} | — | October 26, 2003 | Kitt Peak | Spacewatch | · | 950 m | MPC · JPL |
| 887269 | 2003 WR_{165} | — | November 30, 2003 | Kitt Peak | Spacewatch | · | 1.4 km | MPC · JPL |
| 887270 | 2003 WG_{177} | — | November 20, 2003 | Kitt Peak | Deep Ecliptic Survey | · | 580 m | MPC · JPL |
| 887271 | 2003 WK_{204} | — | November 29, 2003 | Kitt Peak | Spacewatch | EUN | 790 m | MPC · JPL |
| 887272 | 2003 WO_{204} | — | November 22, 2014 | Haleakala | Pan-STARRS 1 | · | 1.7 km | MPC · JPL |
| 887273 | 2003 WS_{212} | — | November 17, 2014 | Haleakala | Pan-STARRS 1 | EOS | 1.2 km | MPC · JPL |
| 887274 | 2003 WU_{212} | — | October 29, 2014 | Haleakala | Pan-STARRS 1 | · | 2.4 km | MPC · JPL |
| 887275 | 2003 WU_{213} | — | April 27, 2017 | Haleakala | Pan-STARRS 1 | EOS | 1.3 km | MPC · JPL |
| 887276 | 2003 WR_{217} | — | November 24, 2003 | Kitt Peak | Spacewatch | MAS | 470 m | MPC · JPL |
| 887277 | 2003 WU_{217} | — | November 20, 2003 | Kitt Peak | Spacewatch | · | 540 m | MPC · JPL |
| 887278 | 2003 WC_{218} | — | November 30, 2003 | Kitt Peak | Spacewatch | · | 1.0 km | MPC · JPL |
| 887279 | 2003 XM_{46} | — | October 20, 2008 | Mount Lemmon | Mount Lemmon Survey | · | 1.4 km | MPC · JPL |
| 887280 | 2003 YX_{161} | — | December 17, 2003 | Kitt Peak | Spacewatch | H | 390 m | MPC · JPL |
| 887281 | 2003 YP_{186} | — | December 29, 2003 | Kitt Peak | Spacewatch | H | 460 m | MPC · JPL |
| 887282 | 2003 YC_{188} | — | November 29, 2014 | Mount Lemmon | Mount Lemmon Survey | · | 860 m | MPC · JPL |
| 887283 | 2003 YB_{190} | — | December 21, 2003 | Kitt Peak | Spacewatch | · | 1.8 km | MPC · JPL |
| 887284 | 2004 AZ_{19} | — | January 15, 2004 | Kitt Peak | Spacewatch | · | 1.1 km | MPC · JPL |
| 887285 | 2004 AF_{21} | — | January 15, 2004 | Kitt Peak | Spacewatch | · | 540 m | MPC · JPL |
| 887286 | 2004 BF_{7} | — | January 16, 2004 | Kitt Peak | Spacewatch | · | 1.2 km | MPC · JPL |
| 887287 | 2004 BG_{25} | — | January 16, 2004 | Kitt Peak | Spacewatch | · | 1.2 km | MPC · JPL |
| 887288 | 2004 BL_{57} | — | November 21, 2003 | Kitt Peak | Spacewatch | · | 1.1 km | MPC · JPL |
| 887289 | 2004 BR_{69} | — | January 19, 2004 | Kitt Peak | Spacewatch | H | 370 m | MPC · JPL |
| 887290 | 2004 BU_{77} | — | January 22, 2004 | Socorro | LINEAR | · | 1.2 km | MPC · JPL |
| 887291 | 2004 BQ_{138} | — | January 19, 2004 | Kitt Peak | Spacewatch | · | 1.6 km | MPC · JPL |
| 887292 | 2004 BB_{143} | — | January 19, 2004 | Kitt Peak | Spacewatch | · | 630 m | MPC · JPL |
| 887293 | 2004 BA_{148} | — | January 16, 2004 | Palomar | NEAT | · | 970 m | MPC · JPL |
| 887294 | 2004 BP_{148} | — | January 16, 2004 | Kitt Peak | Spacewatch | · | 930 m | MPC · JPL |
| 887295 | 2004 BM_{172} | — | January 31, 2004 | Apache Point | SDSS | · | 1.6 km | MPC · JPL |
| 887296 | 2004 BO_{173} | — | January 30, 2004 | Kitt Peak | Spacewatch | · | 930 m | MPC · JPL |
| 887297 | 2004 BF_{174} | — | January 19, 2004 | Kitt Peak | Spacewatch | · | 1.1 km | MPC · JPL |
| 887298 | 2004 CR_{63} | — | January 30, 2004 | Socorro | LINEAR | · | 1.4 km | MPC · JPL |
| 887299 | 2004 CB_{64} | — | February 13, 2004 | Kitt Peak | Spacewatch | T_{j} (2.94) | 1.8 km | MPC · JPL |
| 887300 | 2004 CU_{120} | — | February 12, 2004 | Kitt Peak | Spacewatch | · | 1.2 km | MPC · JPL |

== 887301–887400 ==
back to top

| Designation | | | Discovery | | | Properties | | Ref |
| Permanent | Provisional | Named after | Date | Site | Discoverer(s) | Category | Diam. | Ref |
|---|---|---|---|---|---|---|---|---|
| 887301 | 2004 CA_{135} | — | February 17, 2015 | Haleakala | Pan-STARRS 1 | MAS | 460 m | MPC · JPL |
| 887302 | 2004 DA_{54} | — | February 12, 2004 | Kitt Peak | Spacewatch | · | 1.4 km | MPC · JPL |
| 887303 | 2004 DX_{74} | — | February 17, 2004 | Kitt Peak | Spacewatch | · | 440 m | MPC · JPL |
| 887304 | 2004 DL_{76} | — | February 17, 2004 | Kitt Peak | Spacewatch | · | 850 m | MPC · JPL |
| 887305 | 2004 DT_{84} | — | February 16, 2004 | Kitt Peak | Spacewatch | TIR | 2.0 km | MPC · JPL |
| 887306 | 2004 DY_{86} | — | April 22, 2009 | Mount Lemmon | Mount Lemmon Survey | · | 1.1 km | MPC · JPL |
| 887307 | 2004 EG_{6} | — | March 12, 2004 | Palomar | NEAT | · | 1.2 km | MPC · JPL |
| 887308 | 2004 EW_{45} | — | January 27, 2004 | Kitt Peak | Spacewatch | TIR | 1.8 km | MPC · JPL |
| 887309 | 2004 EA_{101} | — | March 15, 2004 | Kitt Peak | Spacewatch | · | 980 m | MPC · JPL |
| 887310 | 2004 EP_{104} | — | March 15, 2004 | Kitt Peak | Spacewatch | T_{j} (2.94) · 3:2 | 3.5 km | MPC · JPL |
| 887311 | 2004 EZ_{104} | — | March 15, 2004 | Kitt Peak | Spacewatch | MAS | 420 m | MPC · JPL |
| 887312 | 2004 ET_{108} | — | March 15, 2004 | Kitt Peak | Spacewatch | · | 470 m | MPC · JPL |
| 887313 | 2004 FR_{1} | — | March 17, 2004 | Kitt Peak | Spacewatch | H | 380 m | MPC · JPL |
| 887314 | 2004 FM_{71} | — | March 17, 2004 | Kitt Peak | Spacewatch | MAS | 430 m | MPC · JPL |
| 887315 | 2004 FB_{100} | — | March 23, 2004 | Kitt Peak | Spacewatch | · | 870 m | MPC · JPL |
| 887316 | 2004 FM_{144} | — | March 29, 2004 | Kitt Peak | Spacewatch | · | 810 m | MPC · JPL |
| 887317 | 2004 FS_{173} | — | January 21, 2015 | Haleakala | Pan-STARRS 1 | · | 810 m | MPC · JPL |
| 887318 | 2004 FX_{174} | — | March 17, 2015 | Mount Lemmon | Mount Lemmon Survey | MAS | 470 m | MPC · JPL |
| 887319 | 2004 FV_{177} | — | March 16, 2004 | Kitt Peak | Spacewatch | · | 480 m | MPC · JPL |
| 887320 | 2004 GQ_{47} | — | April 12, 2004 | Kitt Peak | Spacewatch | · | 700 m | MPC · JPL |
| 887321 | 2004 HP_{69} | — | April 22, 2004 | Kitt Peak | Spacewatch | · | 790 m | MPC · JPL |
| 887322 | 2004 JR_{37} | — | May 13, 2004 | Kitt Peak | Spacewatch | · | 1.3 km | MPC · JPL |
| 887323 | 2004 JW_{38} | — | May 14, 2004 | Kitt Peak | Spacewatch | · | 1.4 km | MPC · JPL |
| 887324 | 2004 MO_{3} | — | June 21, 2004 | Socorro | LINEAR | APO | 130 m | MPC · JPL |
| 887325 | 2004 PS_{109} | — | July 17, 2004 | Cerro Tololo | Deep Ecliptic Survey | · | 1.3 km | MPC · JPL |
| 887326 | 2004 PA_{110} | — | July 21, 2004 | Siding Spring | SSS | · | 670 m | MPC · JPL |
| 887327 | 2004 QZ_{14} | — | August 22, 2004 | Kitt Peak | Spacewatch | · | 420 m | MPC · JPL |
| 887328 | 2004 QW_{23} | — | August 22, 2004 | Mauna Kea | Veillet, C. | · | 1.2 km | MPC · JPL |
| 887329 | 2004 QA_{38} | — | August 25, 2004 | Kitt Peak | Spacewatch | · | 350 m | MPC · JPL |
| 887330 | 2004 RF_{237} | — | September 10, 2004 | Kitt Peak | Spacewatch | (5) | 710 m | MPC · JPL |
| 887331 | 2004 RH_{270} | — | September 11, 2004 | Kitt Peak | Spacewatch | · | 1.2 km | MPC · JPL |
| 887332 | 2004 RK_{272} | — | September 11, 2004 | Kitt Peak | Spacewatch | · | 820 m | MPC · JPL |
| 887333 | 2004 RT_{278} | — | September 15, 2004 | Kitt Peak | Spacewatch | · | 1.7 km | MPC · JPL |
| 887334 | 2004 RB_{352} | — | September 12, 2004 | Mauna Kea | P. A. Wiegert, S. Popa | · | 940 m | MPC · JPL |
| 887335 | 2004 RA_{360} | — | August 3, 2008 | Siding Spring | SSS | · | 1.0 km | MPC · JPL |
| 887336 | 2004 SR_{64} | — | September 23, 2004 | Kitt Peak | Spacewatch | · | 810 m | MPC · JPL |
| 887337 | 2004 TL_{4} | — | October 4, 2004 | Kitt Peak | Spacewatch | · | 570 m | MPC · JPL |
| 887338 | 2004 TD_{8} | — | October 5, 2004 | Kitt Peak | Spacewatch | · | 340 m | MPC · JPL |
| 887339 | 2004 TJ_{36} | — | September 22, 2004 | Kitt Peak | Spacewatch | THM | 1.4 km | MPC · JPL |
| 887340 | 2004 TO_{94} | — | October 5, 2004 | Kitt Peak | Spacewatch | · | 610 m | MPC · JPL |
| 887341 | 2004 TX_{94} | — | October 5, 2004 | Kitt Peak | Spacewatch | · | 1.5 km | MPC · JPL |
| 887342 | 2004 TT_{151} | — | October 6, 2004 | Kitt Peak | Spacewatch | · | 1.3 km | MPC · JPL |
| 887343 | 2004 TZ_{191} | — | October 7, 2004 | Kitt Peak | Spacewatch | · | 650 m | MPC · JPL |
| 887344 | 2004 TT_{258} | — | December 13, 2015 | Haleakala | Pan-STARRS 1 | · | 1.0 km | MPC · JPL |
| 887345 | 2004 TM_{351} | — | October 10, 2004 | Kitt Peak | Spacewatch | · | 800 m | MPC · JPL |
| 887346 | 2004 TO_{361} | — | October 13, 2004 | Kitt Peak | Spacewatch | · | 1 km | MPC · JPL |
| 887347 | 2004 TR_{376} | — | September 4, 2011 | Haleakala | Pan-STARRS 1 | · | 630 m | MPC · JPL |
| 887348 | 2004 TO_{385} | — | October 14, 2004 | Kitt Peak | Spacewatch | · | 540 m | MPC · JPL |
| 887349 | 2004 VH_{66} | — | November 4, 2004 | Kitt Peak | Spacewatch | · | 700 m | MPC · JPL |
| 887350 | 2004 VE_{79} | — | November 3, 2004 | Kitt Peak | Spacewatch | · | 1.3 km | MPC · JPL |
| 887351 | 2004 VN_{83} | — | November 10, 2004 | Kitt Peak | Spacewatch | (2076) | 530 m | MPC · JPL |
| 887352 | 2004 VA_{90} | — | November 4, 2004 | Catalina | CSS | THB | 2.4 km | MPC · JPL |
| 887353 | 2004 VO_{118} | — | November 9, 2004 | Mauna Kea | P. A. Wiegert, A. Papadimos | V | 300 m | MPC · JPL |
| 887354 | 2004 VL_{122} | — | October 10, 2004 | Kitt Peak | Deep Ecliptic Survey | · | 910 m | MPC · JPL |
| 887355 | 2004 VH_{137} | — | January 23, 2006 | Kitt Peak | Spacewatch | · | 1.4 km | MPC · JPL |
| 887356 | 2004 VM_{137} | — | September 18, 2014 | Haleakala | Pan-STARRS 1 | · | 510 m | MPC · JPL |
| 887357 | 2004 XD_{34} | — | December 11, 2004 | Campo Imperatore | CINEOS | · | 450 m | MPC · JPL |
| 887358 | 2004 XU_{63} | — | December 2, 2004 | Kitt Peak | Spacewatch | · | 630 m | MPC · JPL |
| 887359 | 2004 XQ_{71} | — | December 12, 2004 | Kitt Peak | Spacewatch | · | 770 m | MPC · JPL |
| 887360 | 2004 XN_{72} | — | December 14, 2004 | Kitt Peak | Spacewatch | · | 480 m | MPC · JPL |
| 887361 | 2004 XT_{74} | — | December 9, 2004 | Vail-Jarnac | Observatory, Jarnac | · | 1.5 km | MPC · JPL |
| 887362 | 2004 XN_{160} | — | December 14, 2004 | Kitt Peak | Spacewatch | · | 840 m | MPC · JPL |
| 887363 | 2004 XU_{172} | — | December 10, 2004 | Kitt Peak | Spacewatch | PHO | 690 m | MPC · JPL |
| 887364 | 2004 XM_{184} | — | November 20, 2004 | Kitt Peak | Spacewatch | · | 490 m | MPC · JPL |
| 887365 | 2004 XW_{188} | — | December 15, 2004 | Mauna Kea | P. A. Wiegert, D. D. Balam | · | 800 m | MPC · JPL |
| 887366 | 2004 XX_{196} | — | January 17, 2016 | Haleakala | Pan-STARRS 1 | · | 490 m | MPC · JPL |
| 887367 | 2004 XN_{197} | — | November 27, 2011 | Mount Lemmon | Mount Lemmon Survey | PHO | 860 m | MPC · JPL |
| 887368 | 2004 YX_{1} | — | December 19, 2004 | Socorro | LINEAR | · | 1.1 km | MPC · JPL |
| 887369 | 2004 YN_{11} | — | December 19, 2004 | Mount Lemmon | Mount Lemmon Survey | · | 1.1 km | MPC · JPL |
| 887370 | 2004 YJ_{25} | — | December 19, 2004 | Mount Lemmon | Mount Lemmon Survey | · | 720 m | MPC · JPL |
| 887371 | 2004 YN_{38} | — | September 29, 2011 | Kitt Peak | Spacewatch | · | 690 m | MPC · JPL |
| 887372 | 2004 YK_{39} | — | December 18, 2004 | Mount Lemmon | Mount Lemmon Survey | · | 1.1 km | MPC · JPL |
| 887373 | 2004 YY_{41} | — | December 19, 2004 | Kitt Peak | Spacewatch | · | 2.0 km | MPC · JPL |
| 887374 | 2004 YG_{42} | — | December 20, 2004 | Mount Lemmon | Mount Lemmon Survey | · | 1.8 km | MPC · JPL |
| 887375 | 2005 AO_{73} | — | January 15, 2005 | Kitt Peak | Spacewatch | · | 510 m | MPC · JPL |
| 887376 | 2005 AU_{84} | — | January 15, 2005 | Kitt Peak | Spacewatch | · | 540 m | MPC · JPL |
| 887377 | 2005 AH_{85} | — | January 7, 2005 | Campo Imperatore | CINEOS | BRG | 1.1 km | MPC · JPL |
| 887378 | 2005 BN_{30} | — | January 18, 2005 | Kitt Peak | Spacewatch | HNS | 760 m | MPC · JPL |
| 887379 | 2005 BO_{33} | — | January 16, 2005 | Mauna Kea | Veillet, C. | · | 850 m | MPC · JPL |
| 887380 | 2005 BP_{33} | — | January 16, 2005 | Mauna Kea | Veillet, C. | · | 1.1 km | MPC · JPL |
| 887381 | 2005 BB_{35} | — | January 16, 2005 | Mauna Kea | Veillet, C. | · | 760 m | MPC · JPL |
| 887382 | 2005 BG_{53} | — | January 17, 2005 | Kitt Peak | Spacewatch | · | 1.1 km | MPC · JPL |
| 887383 | 2005 CQ_{33} | — | February 2, 2005 | Kitt Peak | Spacewatch | · | 1.6 km | MPC · JPL |
| 887384 | 2005 CL_{86} | — | February 16, 2012 | Haleakala | Pan-STARRS 1 | · | 420 m | MPC · JPL |
| 887385 | 2005 CP_{86} | — | November 10, 2017 | Haleakala | Pan-STARRS 1 | H | 400 m | MPC · JPL |
| 887386 | 2005 CA_{89} | — | February 9, 2005 | Kitt Peak | Spacewatch | (5) | 830 m | MPC · JPL |
| 887387 | 2005 CW_{89} | — | February 9, 2005 | Mount Lemmon | Mount Lemmon Survey | · | 520 m | MPC · JPL |
| 887388 | 2005 CO_{90} | — | February 9, 2005 | Kitt Peak | Spacewatch | · | 990 m | MPC · JPL |
| 887389 | 2005 DB_{4} | — | March 19, 2009 | Kitt Peak | Spacewatch | · | 1.2 km | MPC · JPL |
| 887390 | 2005 EV_{14} | — | March 3, 2005 | Kitt Peak | Spacewatch | · | 650 m | MPC · JPL |
| 887391 | 2005 EY_{18} | — | March 3, 2005 | Kitt Peak | Spacewatch | · | 1.4 km | MPC · JPL |
| 887392 | 2005 ES_{21} | — | March 3, 2005 | Catalina | CSS | · | 1.0 km | MPC · JPL |
| 887393 | 2005 EP_{37} | — | March 4, 2005 | Mount Lemmon | Mount Lemmon Survey | · | 600 m | MPC · JPL |
| 887394 | 2005 EN_{38} | — | February 9, 2005 | Kitt Peak | Spacewatch | H | 420 m | MPC · JPL |
| 887395 | 2005 EB_{42} | — | March 2, 2005 | Kitt Peak | Spacewatch | · | 670 m | MPC · JPL |
| 887396 | 2005 ED_{64} | — | March 4, 2005 | Mount Lemmon | Mount Lemmon Survey | · | 1.6 km | MPC · JPL |
| 887397 | 2005 EL_{88} | — | March 3, 2005 | Catalina | CSS | · | 900 m | MPC · JPL |
| 887398 | 2005 EG_{113} | — | March 4, 2005 | Mount Lemmon | Mount Lemmon Survey | · | 860 m | MPC · JPL |
| 887399 | 2005 EG_{158} | — | March 9, 2005 | Mount Lemmon | Mount Lemmon Survey | · | 910 m | MPC · JPL |
| 887400 | 2005 ER_{166} | — | March 11, 2005 | Mount Lemmon | Mount Lemmon Survey | · | 950 m | MPC · JPL |

== 887401–887500 ==
back to top

| Designation | | | Discovery | | | Properties | | Ref |
| Permanent | Provisional | Named after | Date | Site | Discoverer(s) | Category | Diam. | Ref |
|---|---|---|---|---|---|---|---|---|
| 887401 | 2005 ES_{190} | — | February 4, 2005 | Mount Lemmon | Mount Lemmon Survey | · | 1.4 km | MPC · JPL |
| 887402 | 2005 EG_{196} | — | March 11, 2005 | Mount Lemmon | Mount Lemmon Survey | · | 1.7 km | MPC · JPL |
| 887403 | 2005 EN_{244} | — | March 11, 2005 | Mount Lemmon | Mount Lemmon Survey | · | 470 m | MPC · JPL |
| 887404 | 2005 EN_{263} | — | March 13, 2005 | Mount Lemmon | Mount Lemmon Survey | · | 540 m | MPC · JPL |
| 887405 | 2005 EC_{276} | — | March 8, 2005 | Mount Lemmon | Mount Lemmon Survey | MAS | 530 m | MPC · JPL |
| 887406 | 2005 ES_{288} | — | March 8, 2005 | Mount Lemmon | Mount Lemmon Survey | · | 1.1 km | MPC · JPL |
| 887407 | 2005 EP_{305} | — | March 11, 2005 | Kitt Peak | Deep Ecliptic Survey | · | 1.7 km | MPC · JPL |
| 887408 | 2005 EJ_{315} | — | March 11, 2005 | Mount Lemmon | Mount Lemmon Survey | NYS | 710 m | MPC · JPL |
| 887409 | 2005 EM_{319} | — | March 13, 2016 | Flagstaff | Wasserman, L. H. | · | 1.6 km | MPC · JPL |
| 887410 | 2005 EU_{338} | — | April 3, 2016 | Haleakala | Pan-STARRS 1 | · | 650 m | MPC · JPL |
| 887411 | 2005 EH_{339} | — | March 4, 2012 | Mount Lemmon | Mount Lemmon Survey | · | 640 m | MPC · JPL |
| 887412 | 2005 EN_{339} | — | February 16, 2012 | Haleakala | Pan-STARRS 1 | · | 690 m | MPC · JPL |
| 887413 | 2005 EQ_{339} | — | March 11, 2005 | Kitt Peak | Spacewatch | · | 1.5 km | MPC · JPL |
| 887414 | 2005 EE_{342} | — | March 2, 2005 | Kitt Peak | Spacewatch | · | 650 m | MPC · JPL |
| 887415 | 2005 EQ_{342} | — | February 7, 2013 | Kitt Peak | Spacewatch | H | 310 m | MPC · JPL |
| 887416 | 2005 EQ_{348} | — | March 14, 2005 | Mount Lemmon | Mount Lemmon Survey | · | 820 m | MPC · JPL |
| 887417 | 2005 EZ_{349} | — | March 8, 2005 | Mount Lemmon | Mount Lemmon Survey | · | 1.1 km | MPC · JPL |
| 887418 | 2005 EJ_{350} | — | March 10, 2005 | Kitt Peak | Spacewatch | · | 710 m | MPC · JPL |
| 887419 | 2005 EZ_{350} | — | March 10, 2005 | Mount Lemmon | Mount Lemmon Survey | · | 1.5 km | MPC · JPL |
| 887420 | 2005 ER_{351} | — | March 11, 2005 | Mount Lemmon | Mount Lemmon Survey | · | 980 m | MPC · JPL |
| 887421 | 2005 EY_{351} | — | March 8, 2005 | Mount Lemmon | Mount Lemmon Survey | · | 800 m | MPC · JPL |
| 887422 | 2005 EB_{352} | — | March 10, 2005 | Mount Lemmon | Mount Lemmon Survey | EUN | 770 m | MPC · JPL |
| 887423 | 2005 FU_{16} | — | March 16, 2005 | Catalina | CSS | · | 1.2 km | MPC · JPL |
| 887424 | 2005 FO_{18} | — | March 21, 2012 | Catalina | CSS | · | 550 m | MPC · JPL |
| 887425 | 2005 FB_{19} | — | March 17, 2005 | Mount Lemmon | Mount Lemmon Survey | · | 590 m | MPC · JPL |
| 887426 | 2005 FR_{20} | — | March 17, 2005 | Mount Lemmon | Mount Lemmon Survey | (5) | 810 m | MPC · JPL |
| 887427 | 2005 GZ_{8} | — | April 3, 2005 | Palomar | NEAT | · | 1.3 km | MPC · JPL |
| 887428 | 2005 GM_{14} | — | March 9, 2005 | Mount Lemmon | Mount Lemmon Survey | · | 1.4 km | MPC · JPL |
| 887429 | 2005 GD_{48} | — | April 5, 2005 | Mount Lemmon | Mount Lemmon Survey | · | 850 m | MPC · JPL |
| 887430 | 2005 GF_{95} | — | April 6, 2005 | Kitt Peak | Spacewatch | · | 1.0 km | MPC · JPL |
| 887431 | 2005 GD_{109} | — | April 10, 2005 | Mount Lemmon | Mount Lemmon Survey | · | 1.9 km | MPC · JPL |
| 887432 | 2005 GR_{109} | — | April 10, 2005 | Mount Lemmon | Mount Lemmon Survey | · | 1.6 km | MPC · JPL |
| 887433 | 2005 GU_{110} | — | April 10, 2005 | Kitt Peak | Spacewatch | · | 820 m | MPC · JPL |
| 887434 | 2005 GZ_{166} | — | April 11, 2005 | Mount Lemmon | Mount Lemmon Survey | NYS | 640 m | MPC · JPL |
| 887435 | 2005 GY_{171} | — | March 14, 2005 | Mount Lemmon | Mount Lemmon Survey | · | 1.1 km | MPC · JPL |
| 887436 | 2005 GU_{177} | — | April 15, 2005 | Kitt Peak | Spacewatch | · | 550 m | MPC · JPL |
| 887437 | 2005 GS_{183} | — | March 4, 2005 | Mount Lemmon | Mount Lemmon Survey | · | 410 m | MPC · JPL |
| 887438 | 2005 GF_{194} | — | April 10, 2005 | Kitt Peak | Deep Ecliptic Survey | · | 910 m | MPC · JPL |
| 887439 | 2005 GV_{197} | — | April 10, 2005 | Kitt Peak | Deep Ecliptic Survey | · | 2.2 km | MPC · JPL |
| 887440 | 2005 GD_{198} | — | April 10, 2005 | Kitt Peak | Deep Ecliptic Survey | · | 1.8 km | MPC · JPL |
| 887441 | 2005 GQ_{200} | — | February 9, 2005 | Kitt Peak | Spacewatch | · | 660 m | MPC · JPL |
| 887442 | 2005 GH_{232} | — | March 14, 2012 | Kitt Peak | Spacewatch | · | 730 m | MPC · JPL |
| 887443 | 2005 GW_{232} | — | June 8, 2016 | Haleakala | Pan-STARRS 1 | · | 480 m | MPC · JPL |
| 887444 | 2005 GJ_{233} | — | April 14, 2012 | Haleakala | Pan-STARRS 1 | · | 710 m | MPC · JPL |
| 887445 | 2005 GN_{233} | — | April 10, 2005 | Mount Lemmon | Mount Lemmon Survey | · | 940 m | MPC · JPL |
| 887446 | 2005 GC_{236} | — | February 27, 2012 | Haleakala | Pan-STARRS 1 | · | 470 m | MPC · JPL |
| 887447 | 2005 GV_{237} | — | November 21, 2014 | Haleakala | Pan-STARRS 1 | · | 1.6 km | MPC · JPL |
| 887448 | 2005 GH_{239} | — | April 11, 2005 | Kitt Peak | Spacewatch | · | 1.7 km | MPC · JPL |
| 887449 | 2005 HZ_{11} | — | October 10, 2015 | Haleakala | Pan-STARRS 1 | · | 1.2 km | MPC · JPL |
| 887450 | 2005 JU_{6} | — | May 4, 2005 | Mauna Kea | Veillet, C. | · | 2.1 km | MPC · JPL |
| 887451 | 2005 JD_{31} | — | April 1, 2005 | Kitt Peak | Spacewatch | EUN | 880 m | MPC · JPL |
| 887452 | 2005 JL_{51} | — | April 16, 2005 | Kitt Peak | Spacewatch | · | 520 m | MPC · JPL |
| 887453 | 2005 JX_{111} | — | May 9, 2005 | Mount Lemmon | Mount Lemmon Survey | · | 1.0 km | MPC · JPL |
| 887454 | 2005 JN_{116} | — | May 10, 2005 | Mount Lemmon | Mount Lemmon Survey | · | 640 m | MPC · JPL |
| 887455 | 2005 JB_{120} | — | April 7, 2005 | Mount Lemmon | Mount Lemmon Survey | EUN | 760 m | MPC · JPL |
| 887456 | 2005 JY_{131} | — | May 13, 2005 | Kitt Peak | Spacewatch | · | 980 m | MPC · JPL |
| 887457 | 2005 JT_{152} | — | May 4, 2005 | Kitt Peak | Spacewatch | · | 1.7 km | MPC · JPL |
| 887458 | 2005 JW_{153} | — | May 4, 2005 | Kitt Peak | Spacewatch | · | 1.0 km | MPC · JPL |
| 887459 | 2005 JH_{164} | — | May 10, 2005 | Kitt Peak | Spacewatch | · | 1.2 km | MPC · JPL |
| 887460 | 2005 JB_{189} | — | January 16, 2008 | Kitt Peak | Spacewatch | · | 680 m | MPC · JPL |
| 887461 | 2005 JS_{194} | — | May 12, 2005 | Mount Lemmon | Mount Lemmon Survey | · | 1.2 km | MPC · JPL |
| 887462 | 2005 LW_{54} | — | December 16, 2006 | Mount Lemmon | Mount Lemmon Survey | · | 730 m | MPC · JPL |
| 887463 | 2005 LV_{58} | — | September 26, 2006 | Mount Lemmon | Mount Lemmon Survey | KOR | 1 km | MPC · JPL |
| 887464 | 2005 MN_{51} | — | May 19, 2005 | Palomar | NEAT | · | 1.9 km | MPC · JPL |
| 887465 | 2005 MB_{56} | — | June 16, 2005 | Kitt Peak | Spacewatch | · | 1.2 km | MPC · JPL |
| 887466 | 2005 MC_{56} | — | June 30, 2005 | Kitt Peak | Spacewatch | · | 660 m | MPC · JPL |
| 887467 | 2005 NH_{11} | — | June 17, 2005 | Mount Lemmon | Mount Lemmon Survey | · | 1.2 km | MPC · JPL |
| 887468 | 2005 NP_{12} | — | July 4, 2005 | Mount Lemmon | Mount Lemmon Survey | · | 410 m | MPC · JPL |
| 887469 | 2005 NG_{29} | — | July 6, 2005 | Kitt Peak | Spacewatch | · | 600 m | MPC · JPL |
| 887470 | 2005 NR_{109} | — | July 7, 2005 | Mauna Kea | Veillet, C. | DOR | 1.4 km | MPC · JPL |
| 887471 | 2005 NB_{114} | — | July 7, 2005 | Mauna Kea | Veillet, C. | · | 1.5 km | MPC · JPL |
| 887472 | 2005 ND_{133} | — | July 5, 2005 | Mount Lemmon | Mount Lemmon Survey | · | 1.6 km | MPC · JPL |
| 887473 | 2005 OA_{35} | — | July 29, 2005 | Palomar | NEAT | TIR | 2.6 km | MPC · JPL |
| 887474 | 2005 PT_{24} | — | February 13, 2008 | Mount Lemmon | Mount Lemmon Survey | · | 850 m | MPC · JPL |
| 887475 | 2005 PY_{30} | — | August 29, 2005 | Kitt Peak | Spacewatch | · | 1.2 km | MPC · JPL |
| 887476 | 2005 QQ_{30} | — | August 29, 2005 | Siding Spring | SSS | APO | 360 m | MPC · JPL |
| 887477 | 2005 QH_{47} | — | August 28, 2005 | Kitt Peak | Spacewatch | H | 330 m | MPC · JPL |
| 887478 | 2005 QB_{164} | — | September 1, 2005 | Palomar | NEAT | · | 1.1 km | MPC · JPL |
| 887479 | 2005 QG_{194} | — | August 30, 2005 | Kitt Peak | Spacewatch | · | 350 m | MPC · JPL |
| 887480 | 2005 QM_{199} | — | November 14, 2015 | Mount Lemmon | Mount Lemmon Survey | · | 380 m | MPC · JPL |
| 887481 | 2005 QF_{208} | — | August 28, 2005 | Kitt Peak | Spacewatch | · | 650 m | MPC · JPL |
| 887482 | 2005 RS_{46} | — | October 1, 2005 | Apache Point | SDSS Collaboration | · | 700 m | MPC · JPL |
| 887483 | 2005 RR_{54} | — | September 13, 2005 | Kitt Peak | Spacewatch | NYS | 720 m | MPC · JPL |
| 887484 | 2005 RQ_{59} | — | September 11, 2005 | Kitt Peak | Spacewatch | · | 480 m | MPC · JPL |
| 887485 | 2005 RV_{59} | — | September 14, 2005 | Kitt Peak | Spacewatch | · | 1.2 km | MPC · JPL |
| 887486 | 2005 RE_{60} | — | September 11, 2005 | Kitt Peak | Spacewatch | H | 380 m | MPC · JPL |
| 887487 | 2005 SR_{108} | — | September 26, 2005 | Kitt Peak | Spacewatch | · | 790 m | MPC · JPL |
| 887488 | 2005 SK_{174} | — | September 29, 2005 | Kitt Peak | Spacewatch | · | 390 m | MPC · JPL |
| 887489 | 2005 SM_{195} | — | September 30, 2005 | Kitt Peak | Spacewatch | · | 870 m | MPC · JPL |
| 887490 | 2005 SJ_{199} | — | August 29, 2005 | Kitt Peak | Spacewatch | · | 470 m | MPC · JPL |
| 887491 | 2005 SB_{231} | — | September 30, 2005 | Mount Lemmon | Mount Lemmon Survey | · | 1.2 km | MPC · JPL |
| 887492 | 2005 SU_{264} | — | September 25, 2005 | Catalina | CSS | · | 960 m | MPC · JPL |
| 887493 | 2005 SU_{300} | — | September 29, 2005 | Kitt Peak | Spacewatch | · | 440 m | MPC · JPL |
| 887494 | 2005 TP_{17} | — | October 1, 2005 | Mount Lemmon | Mount Lemmon Survey | · | 1.1 km | MPC · JPL |
| 887495 | 2005 TL_{80} | — | September 22, 2000 | Kitt Peak | Spacewatch | · | 1.2 km | MPC · JPL |
| 887496 | 2005 TZ_{87} | — | October 5, 2005 | Kitt Peak | Spacewatch | · | 1.3 km | MPC · JPL |
| 887497 | 2005 TQ_{118} | — | October 7, 2005 | Mount Lemmon | Mount Lemmon Survey | · | 1.3 km | MPC · JPL |
| 887498 | 2005 TW_{133} | — | September 26, 2005 | Kitt Peak | Spacewatch | · | 490 m | MPC · JPL |
| 887499 | 2005 TD_{183} | — | October 6, 2005 | Mount Lemmon | Mount Lemmon Survey | · | 480 m | MPC · JPL |
| 887500 | 2005 TW_{191} | — | October 2, 2005 | Mount Lemmon | Mount Lemmon Survey | · | 490 m | MPC · JPL |

== 887501–887600 ==
back to top

| Designation | | | Discovery | | | Properties | | Ref |
| Permanent | Provisional | Named after | Date | Site | Discoverer(s) | Category | Diam. | Ref |
|---|---|---|---|---|---|---|---|---|
| 887501 | 2005 TW_{203} | — | February 25, 2011 | Mount Lemmon | Mount Lemmon Survey | · | 890 m | MPC · JPL |
| 887502 | 2005 TP_{210} | — | November 7, 2015 | Mount Lemmon | Mount Lemmon Survey | KOR | 830 m | MPC · JPL |
| 887503 | 2005 TX_{214} | — | October 4, 2005 | Mount Lemmon | Mount Lemmon Survey | T_{j} (2.85) | 2.1 km | MPC · JPL |
| 887504 | 2005 TM_{216} | — | October 8, 2005 | Kitt Peak | Spacewatch | · | 980 m | MPC · JPL |
| 887505 | 2005 TD_{224} | — | October 5, 2005 | Kitt Peak | Spacewatch | · | 460 m | MPC · JPL |
| 887506 | 2005 UU_{13} | — | October 11, 2005 | Kitt Peak | Spacewatch | · | 1.0 km | MPC · JPL |
| 887507 | 2005 UY_{33} | — | October 24, 2005 | Kitt Peak | Spacewatch | · | 1.4 km | MPC · JPL |
| 887508 | 2005 UG_{91} | — | October 22, 2005 | Kitt Peak | Spacewatch | · | 1.3 km | MPC · JPL |
| 887509 | 2005 UL_{192} | — | October 27, 2005 | Kitt Peak | Spacewatch | · | 1.9 km | MPC · JPL |
| 887510 | 2005 UH_{267} | — | October 27, 2005 | Kitt Peak | Spacewatch | (5) | 780 m | MPC · JPL |
| 887511 | 2005 UV_{324} | — | October 13, 2005 | Kitt Peak | Spacewatch | H | 320 m | MPC · JPL |
| 887512 | 2005 UN_{359} | — | October 25, 2005 | Kitt Peak | Spacewatch | · | 910 m | MPC · JPL |
| 887513 | 2005 US_{434} | — | October 29, 2005 | Mount Lemmon | Mount Lemmon Survey | · | 1.2 km | MPC · JPL |
| 887514 | 2005 UV_{450} | — | October 27, 2005 | Mount Lemmon | Mount Lemmon Survey | · | 830 m | MPC · JPL |
| 887515 | 2005 UX_{536} | — | October 28, 2005 | Catalina | CSS | · | 480 m | MPC · JPL |
| 887516 | 2005 UH_{542} | — | October 24, 2005 | Kitt Peak | Spacewatch | · | 460 m | MPC · JPL |
| 887517 | 2005 UA_{543} | — | September 16, 2009 | Kitt Peak | Spacewatch | (5) | 500 m | MPC · JPL |
| 887518 | 2005 UN_{553} | — | October 29, 2005 | Kitt Peak | Spacewatch | · | 490 m | MPC · JPL |
| 887519 | 2005 UF_{559} | — | October 27, 2005 | Mount Lemmon | Mount Lemmon Survey | · | 1.4 km | MPC · JPL |
| 887520 | 2005 VP_{20} | — | October 24, 2005 | Kitt Peak | Spacewatch | · | 1.0 km | MPC · JPL |
| 887521 | 2005 VZ_{54} | — | October 25, 2005 | Kitt Peak | Spacewatch | · | 420 m | MPC · JPL |
| 887522 | 2005 VT_{107} | — | November 5, 2005 | Kitt Peak | Spacewatch | T_{j} (2.77) · unusual | 3.5 km | MPC · JPL |
| 887523 | 2005 VR_{108} | — | November 6, 2005 | Kitt Peak | Spacewatch | PHO | 660 m | MPC · JPL |
| 887524 | 2005 VM_{133} | — | November 9, 2005 | Apache Point | SDSS Collaboration | · | 1.1 km | MPC · JPL |
| 887525 | 2005 VL_{142} | — | October 23, 2009 | Mount Lemmon | Mount Lemmon Survey | · | 530 m | MPC · JPL |
| 887526 | 2005 VQ_{154} | — | November 6, 2005 | Kitt Peak | Spacewatch | · | 440 m | MPC · JPL |
| 887527 | 2005 VS_{155} | — | November 1, 2005 | Kitt Peak | Spacewatch | · | 1.7 km | MPC · JPL |
| 887528 | 2005 WM_{5} | — | November 20, 2005 | Palomar | NEAT | · | 1.3 km | MPC · JPL |
| 887529 | 2005 WE_{21} | — | November 12, 2005 | Kitt Peak | Spacewatch | · | 560 m | MPC · JPL |
| 887530 | 2005 WV_{23} | — | September 30, 2005 | Mount Lemmon | Mount Lemmon Survey | · | 460 m | MPC · JPL |
| 887531 | 2005 WT_{168} | — | November 22, 2005 | Kitt Peak | Spacewatch | · | 450 m | MPC · JPL |
| 887532 | 2005 WW_{172} | — | November 30, 2005 | Mount Lemmon | Mount Lemmon Survey | · | 810 m | MPC · JPL |
| 887533 | 2005 WO_{176} | — | November 30, 2005 | Kitt Peak | Spacewatch | · | 970 m | MPC · JPL |
| 887534 | 2005 WA_{206} | — | November 30, 2005 | Mount Lemmon | Mount Lemmon Survey | THM | 1.5 km | MPC · JPL |
| 887535 | 2005 WB_{214} | — | November 21, 2005 | Kitt Peak | Spacewatch | · | 380 m | MPC · JPL |
| 887536 | 2005 WH_{215} | — | November 30, 2005 | Kitt Peak | Spacewatch | · | 1.3 km | MPC · JPL |
| 887537 | 2005 XG_{42} | — | December 4, 2005 | Kitt Peak | Spacewatch | · | 1.8 km | MPC · JPL |
| 887538 | 2005 XC_{56} | — | December 5, 2005 | Mount Lemmon | Mount Lemmon Survey | · | 1.8 km | MPC · JPL |
| 887539 | 2005 XU_{60} | — | December 4, 2005 | Kitt Peak | Spacewatch | · | 1.1 km | MPC · JPL |
| 887540 | 2005 XT_{82} | — | December 10, 2005 | Kitt Peak | Spacewatch | · | 520 m | MPC · JPL |
| 887541 | 2005 XQ_{120} | — | December 6, 2005 | Kitt Peak | Spacewatch | · | 530 m | MPC · JPL |
| 887542 | 2005 XQ_{132} | — | December 5, 2005 | Kitt Peak | Spacewatch | · | 510 m | MPC · JPL |
| 887543 | 2005 XY_{133} | — | December 2, 2005 | Kitt Peak | Spacewatch | · | 1.3 km | MPC · JPL |
| 887544 | 2005 YL_{40} | — | December 22, 2005 | Kitt Peak | Spacewatch | THM | 1.6 km | MPC · JPL |
| 887545 | 2005 YJ_{51} | — | December 25, 2005 | Mount Lemmon | Mount Lemmon Survey | · | 450 m | MPC · JPL |
| 887546 | 2005 YQ_{62} | — | December 24, 2005 | Kitt Peak | Spacewatch | · | 450 m | MPC · JPL |
| 887547 | 2005 YL_{75} | — | December 24, 2005 | Kitt Peak | Spacewatch | · | 1.1 km | MPC · JPL |
| 887548 | 2005 YL_{78} | — | December 24, 2005 | Kitt Peak | Spacewatch | · | 850 m | MPC · JPL |
| 887549 | 2005 YF_{88} | — | December 25, 2005 | Mount Lemmon | Mount Lemmon Survey | H | 410 m | MPC · JPL |
| 887550 | 2005 YE_{137} | — | December 26, 2005 | Mount Lemmon | Mount Lemmon Survey | · | 680 m | MPC · JPL |
| 887551 | 2005 YN_{190} | — | December 30, 2005 | Kitt Peak | Spacewatch | EUN | 790 m | MPC · JPL |
| 887552 | 2005 YL_{232} | — | December 10, 2005 | Kitt Peak | Spacewatch | HNS | 720 m | MPC · JPL |
| 887553 | 2005 YE_{233} | — | December 28, 2005 | Mount Lemmon | Mount Lemmon Survey | · | 410 m | MPC · JPL |
| 887554 | 2005 YD_{260} | — | December 2, 2005 | Mount Lemmon | Mount Lemmon Survey | · | 950 m | MPC · JPL |
| 887555 | 2005 YV_{280} | — | January 19, 2002 | Kitt Peak | Spacewatch | · | 740 m | MPC · JPL |
| 887556 | 2005 YG_{288} | — | December 30, 2005 | Kitt Peak | Spacewatch | JUN | 680 m | MPC · JPL |
| 887557 | 2005 YL_{291} | — | December 24, 2005 | Kitt Peak | Spacewatch | · | 990 m | MPC · JPL |
| 887558 | 2005 YN_{297} | — | September 26, 2014 | Mount Lemmon | Mount Lemmon Survey | · | 1.6 km | MPC · JPL |
| 887559 | 2005 YH_{301} | — | December 29, 2005 | Kitt Peak | Spacewatch | · | 1.1 km | MPC · JPL |
| 887560 | 2005 YW_{302} | — | December 29, 2005 | Mount Lemmon | Mount Lemmon Survey | T_{j} (2.95) | 2.6 km | MPC · JPL |
| 887561 | 2005 YB_{303} | — | December 22, 2005 | Kitt Peak | Spacewatch | · | 2.2 km | MPC · JPL |
| 887562 | 2005 YK_{303} | — | December 22, 2005 | Kitt Peak | Spacewatch | (5) | 760 m | MPC · JPL |
| 887563 | 2006 AF_{2} | — | January 2, 2006 | Mount Lemmon | Mount Lemmon Survey | · | 980 m | MPC · JPL |
| 887564 | 2006 AJ_{12} | — | January 4, 2006 | Kitt Peak | Spacewatch | · | 590 m | MPC · JPL |
| 887565 | 2006 AP_{54} | — | January 5, 2006 | Kitt Peak | Spacewatch | · | 550 m | MPC · JPL |
| 887566 | 2006 AQ_{63} | — | January 6, 2006 | Mount Lemmon | Mount Lemmon Survey | · | 760 m | MPC · JPL |
| 887567 | 2006 AE_{110} | — | January 5, 2006 | Kitt Peak | Spacewatch | · | 650 m | MPC · JPL |
| 887568 | 2006 AP_{113} | — | December 25, 2017 | Mount Lemmon | Mount Lemmon Survey | · | 1.1 km | MPC · JPL |
| 887569 | 2006 AX_{114} | — | January 7, 2006 | Kitt Peak | Spacewatch | · | 390 m | MPC · JPL |
| 887570 | 2006 AN_{115} | — | January 7, 2006 | Kitt Peak | Spacewatch | · | 2.5 km | MPC · JPL |
| 887571 | 2006 AK_{116} | — | January 22, 2002 | Kitt Peak | Spacewatch | · | 680 m | MPC · JPL |
| 887572 | 2006 BJ_{16} | — | December 25, 2005 | Mount Lemmon | Mount Lemmon Survey | · | 440 m | MPC · JPL |
| 887573 | 2006 BN_{16} | — | January 22, 2006 | Mount Lemmon | Mount Lemmon Survey | · | 1.0 km | MPC · JPL |
| 887574 | 2006 BK_{17} | — | January 7, 2006 | Kitt Peak | Spacewatch | H | 310 m | MPC · JPL |
| 887575 | 2006 BN_{24} | — | January 10, 2006 | Kitt Peak | Spacewatch | · | 1.1 km | MPC · JPL |
| 887576 | 2006 BZ_{77} | — | January 23, 2006 | Mount Lemmon | Mount Lemmon Survey | (5) | 860 m | MPC · JPL |
| 887577 | 2006 BH_{78} | — | January 23, 2006 | Mount Lemmon | Mount Lemmon Survey | THM | 1.8 km | MPC · JPL |
| 887578 | 2006 BS_{83} | — | January 25, 2006 | Kitt Peak | Spacewatch | · | 710 m | MPC · JPL |
| 887579 | 2006 BA_{107} | — | December 2, 2005 | Kitt Peak | L. H. Wasserman, R. L. Millis | · | 670 m | MPC · JPL |
| 887580 | 2006 BT_{117} | — | January 26, 2006 | Mount Lemmon | Mount Lemmon Survey | · | 910 m | MPC · JPL |
| 887581 | 2006 BU_{154} | — | January 25, 2006 | Kitt Peak | Spacewatch | · | 1.4 km | MPC · JPL |
| 887582 | 2006 BQ_{197} | — | January 30, 2006 | Kitt Peak | Spacewatch | · | 770 m | MPC · JPL |
| 887583 | 2006 BM_{202} | — | January 31, 2006 | Kitt Peak | Spacewatch | · | 470 m | MPC · JPL |
| 887584 | 2006 BQ_{218} | — | January 28, 2006 | Mount Lemmon | Mount Lemmon Survey | · | 820 m | MPC · JPL |
| 887585 | 2006 BZ_{245} | — | January 31, 2006 | Mount Lemmon | Mount Lemmon Survey | · | 1.7 km | MPC · JPL |
| 887586 | 2006 BY_{288} | — | February 14, 2010 | Mount Lemmon | Mount Lemmon Survey | · | 950 m | MPC · JPL |
| 887587 | 2006 BB_{290} | — | January 23, 2006 | Mount Lemmon | Mount Lemmon Survey | · | 610 m | MPC · JPL |
| 887588 | 2006 BD_{293} | — | January 23, 2006 | Kitt Peak | Spacewatch | · | 640 m | MPC · JPL |
| 887589 | 2006 BM_{298} | — | January 26, 2006 | Kitt Peak | Spacewatch | · | 480 m | MPC · JPL |
| 887590 | 2006 BP_{300} | — | January 28, 2006 | Mount Lemmon | Mount Lemmon Survey | VER | 1.9 km | MPC · JPL |
| 887591 | 2006 BA_{301} | — | January 23, 2006 | Mount Lemmon | Mount Lemmon Survey | NYS | 760 m | MPC · JPL |
| 887592 | 2006 BJ_{303} | — | January 22, 2006 | Mount Lemmon | Mount Lemmon Survey | · | 750 m | MPC · JPL |
| 887593 | 2006 BQ_{303} | — | January 22, 2006 | Mount Lemmon | Mount Lemmon Survey | · | 1.1 km | MPC · JPL |
| 887594 | 2006 CC_{1} | — | December 25, 2005 | Kitt Peak | Spacewatch | · | 1.1 km | MPC · JPL |
| 887595 | 2006 CN_{22} | — | February 1, 2006 | Mount Lemmon | Mount Lemmon Survey | · | 950 m | MPC · JPL |
| 887596 | 2006 CO_{34} | — | February 2, 2006 | Mount Lemmon | Mount Lemmon Survey | · | 1.3 km | MPC · JPL |
| 887597 | 2006 CR_{46} | — | January 30, 2006 | Kitt Peak | Spacewatch | MAS | 460 m | MPC · JPL |
| 887598 | 2006 CN_{47} | — | February 7, 2006 | Kitt Peak | Spacewatch | H | 430 m | MPC · JPL |
| 887599 | 2006 CZ_{80} | — | January 26, 2006 | Mount Lemmon | Mount Lemmon Survey | · | 1.2 km | MPC · JPL |
| 887600 | 2006 CU_{83} | — | April 20, 2010 | Mount Lemmon | Mount Lemmon Survey | · | 760 m | MPC · JPL |

== 887601–887700 ==
back to top

| Designation | | | Discovery | | | Properties | | Ref |
| Permanent | Provisional | Named after | Date | Site | Discoverer(s) | Category | Diam. | Ref |
|---|---|---|---|---|---|---|---|---|
| 887601 | 2006 CF_{84} | — | October 24, 2008 | Kitt Peak | Spacewatch | · | 480 m | MPC · JPL |
| 887602 | 2006 CA_{92} | — | February 7, 2006 | Mount Lemmon | Mount Lemmon Survey | · | 2.1 km | MPC · JPL |
| 887603 | 2006 DS_{43} | — | January 28, 2006 | Kitt Peak | Spacewatch | · | 940 m | MPC · JPL |
| 887604 | 2006 DC_{56} | — | February 24, 2006 | Mount Lemmon | Mount Lemmon Survey | · | 650 m | MPC · JPL |
| 887605 | 2006 DK_{69} | — | February 20, 2006 | Kitt Peak | Spacewatch | · | 960 m | MPC · JPL |
| 887606 | 2006 DV_{135} | — | July 31, 2000 | Cerro Tololo | Deep Ecliptic Survey | · | 670 m | MPC · JPL |
| 887607 | 2006 DA_{153} | — | December 2, 2004 | Kitt Peak | Spacewatch | · | 1.4 km | MPC · JPL |
| 887608 | 2006 DX_{167} | — | February 27, 2006 | Kitt Peak | Spacewatch | · | 830 m | MPC · JPL |
| 887609 | 2006 EB_{6} | — | March 2, 2006 | Kitt Peak | Spacewatch | · | 670 m | MPC · JPL |
| 887610 | 2006 EY_{27} | — | March 3, 2006 | Kitt Peak | Spacewatch | · | 430 m | MPC · JPL |
| 887611 | 2006 EM_{36} | — | February 2, 2006 | Mount Lemmon | Mount Lemmon Survey | · | 1.4 km | MPC · JPL |
| 887612 | 2006 EF_{56} | — | March 5, 2006 | Kitt Peak | Spacewatch | · | 900 m | MPC · JPL |
| 887613 | 2006 EV_{79} | — | September 4, 2011 | Haleakala | Pan-STARRS 1 | · | 540 m | MPC · JPL |
| 887614 | 2006 FX_{38} | — | March 3, 2006 | Kitt Peak | Spacewatch | · | 780 m | MPC · JPL |
| 887615 | 2006 FC_{60} | — | March 11, 2014 | Mount Lemmon | Mount Lemmon Survey | · | 720 m | MPC · JPL |
| 887616 | 2006 FW_{60} | — | March 25, 2006 | Kitt Peak | Spacewatch | · | 480 m | MPC · JPL |
| 887617 | 2006 FR_{61} | — | March 23, 2006 | Kitt Peak | Spacewatch | H | 320 m | MPC · JPL |
| 887618 | 2006 GA_{57} | — | February 26, 2014 | Haleakala | Pan-STARRS 1 | · | 610 m | MPC · JPL |
| 887619 | 2006 HN_{99} | — | April 30, 2006 | Kitt Peak | Spacewatch | · | 830 m | MPC · JPL |
| 887620 | 2006 HC_{104} | — | April 19, 2006 | Kitt Peak | Spacewatch | EUN | 790 m | MPC · JPL |
| 887621 | 2006 HL_{132} | — | April 26, 2006 | Cerro Tololo | Deep Ecliptic Survey | · | 600 m | MPC · JPL |
| 887622 | 2006 HE_{136} | — | April 26, 2006 | Cerro Tololo | Deep Ecliptic Survey | · | 1.0 km | MPC · JPL |
| 887623 | 2006 HR_{137} | — | September 21, 2003 | Kitt Peak | Spacewatch | · | 910 m | MPC · JPL |
| 887624 | 2006 HL_{145} | — | April 27, 2006 | Cerro Tololo | Deep Ecliptic Survey | THM | 1.4 km | MPC · JPL |
| 887625 | 2006 HC_{160} | — | April 29, 2006 | Kitt Peak | Spacewatch | · | 680 m | MPC · JPL |
| 887626 | 2006 JM_{66} | — | May 1, 2006 | Kitt Peak | Deep Ecliptic Survey | · | 710 m | MPC · JPL |
| 887627 | 2006 JZ_{69} | — | April 26, 2006 | Cerro Tololo | Deep Ecliptic Survey | · | 1.1 km | MPC · JPL |
| 887628 | 2006 JL_{74} | — | May 1, 2006 | Mauna Kea | P. A. Wiegert | · | 510 m | MPC · JPL |
| 887629 | 2006 JS_{74} | — | May 1, 2006 | Mauna Kea | P. A. Wiegert | · | 480 m | MPC · JPL |
| 887630 | 2006 JW_{87} | — | June 25, 2017 | Haleakala | Pan-STARRS 1 | · | 1.2 km | MPC · JPL |
| 887631 | 2006 KT_{21} | — | May 6, 2006 | Mount Lemmon | Mount Lemmon Survey | · | 460 m | MPC · JPL |
| 887632 | 2006 KC_{36} | — | May 20, 2006 | Kitt Peak | Spacewatch | · | 1.3 km | MPC · JPL |
| 887633 | 2006 KY_{39} | — | May 25, 2006 | Palomar | NEAT | · | 660 m | MPC · JPL |
| 887634 | 2006 KP_{47} | — | May 4, 2006 | Kitt Peak | Spacewatch | · | 1.1 km | MPC · JPL |
| 887635 | 2006 KX_{97} | — | May 9, 2006 | Mount Lemmon | Mount Lemmon Survey | · | 770 m | MPC · JPL |
| 887636 | 2006 KF_{148} | — | May 19, 2006 | Mount Lemmon | Mount Lemmon Survey | EUN | 860 m | MPC · JPL |
| 887637 | 2006 KH_{148} | — | April 9, 2014 | Mount Lemmon | Mount Lemmon Survey | · | 750 m | MPC · JPL |
| 887638 | 2006 KV_{151} | — | May 20, 2006 | Kitt Peak | Spacewatch | · | 590 m | MPC · JPL |
| 887639 | 2006 OQ_{26} | — | July 19, 2006 | Mauna Kea | P. A. Wiegert, D. Subasinghe | EOS | 1.4 km | MPC · JPL |
| 887640 | 2006 OB_{35} | — | July 19, 2006 | Mauna Kea | P. A. Wiegert, D. Subasinghe | · | 460 m | MPC · JPL |
| 887641 | 2006 QF_{146} | — | August 18, 2006 | Kitt Peak | Spacewatch | · | 1.9 km | MPC · JPL |
| 887642 | 2006 QM_{147} | — | August 18, 2006 | Kitt Peak | Spacewatch | MAS | 520 m | MPC · JPL |
| 887643 | 2006 QE_{179} | — | September 25, 2006 | Kitt Peak | Spacewatch | H | 310 m | MPC · JPL |
| 887644 | 2006 QG_{196} | — | August 28, 2006 | Kitt Peak | Spacewatch | · | 1.9 km | MPC · JPL |
| 887645 | 2006 QZ_{197} | — | August 19, 2006 | Kitt Peak | Spacewatch | · | 730 m | MPC · JPL |
| 887646 | 2006 QX_{204} | — | August 28, 2006 | Kitt Peak | Spacewatch | · | 1.7 km | MPC · JPL |
| 887647 | 2006 QH_{208} | — | August 28, 2006 | Kitt Peak | Spacewatch | MAS | 430 m | MPC · JPL |
| 887648 | 2006 RL_{46} | — | September 14, 2006 | Kitt Peak | Spacewatch | · | 1.2 km | MPC · JPL |
| 887649 | 2006 RZ_{125} | — | September 15, 2006 | Kitt Peak | Spacewatch | · | 1.1 km | MPC · JPL |
| 887650 | 2006 SX_{94} | — | September 18, 2006 | Kitt Peak | Spacewatch | H | 340 m | MPC · JPL |
| 887651 | 2006 SZ_{100} | — | September 19, 2006 | Kitt Peak | Spacewatch | · | 1.2 km | MPC · JPL |
| 887652 | 2006 SV_{101} | — | September 19, 2006 | Kitt Peak | Spacewatch | · | 1.1 km | MPC · JPL |
| 887653 | 2006 SW_{113} | — | March 11, 2005 | Kitt Peak | Spacewatch | · | 1.0 km | MPC · JPL |
| 887654 | 2006 SE_{143} | — | September 19, 2006 | Kitt Peak | Spacewatch | DOR | 1.4 km | MPC · JPL |
| 887655 | 2006 SL_{144} | — | September 19, 2006 | Kitt Peak | Spacewatch | · | 950 m | MPC · JPL |
| 887656 | 2006 SJ_{161} | — | September 23, 2006 | Kitt Peak | Spacewatch | H | 280 m | MPC · JPL |
| 887657 | 2006 SD_{163} | — | September 24, 2006 | Kitt Peak | Spacewatch | · | 560 m | MPC · JPL |
| 887658 | 2006 SG_{205} | — | September 25, 2006 | Mount Lemmon | Mount Lemmon Survey | · | 750 m | MPC · JPL |
| 887659 | 2006 SZ_{253} | — | September 18, 2006 | Kitt Peak | Spacewatch | MAS | 490 m | MPC · JPL |
| 887660 | 2006 SC_{266} | — | September 26, 2006 | Kitt Peak | Spacewatch | PHO | 780 m | MPC · JPL |
| 887661 | 2006 SV_{272} | — | September 27, 2006 | Mount Lemmon | Mount Lemmon Survey | H | 390 m | MPC · JPL |
| 887662 | 2006 SL_{294} | — | September 25, 2006 | Kitt Peak | Spacewatch | · | 810 m | MPC · JPL |
| 887663 | 2006 SG_{389} | — | September 16, 2006 | Apache Point | SDSS Collaboration | · | 2.2 km | MPC · JPL |
| 887664 | 2006 SC_{400} | — | September 19, 2006 | Kitt Peak | Spacewatch | · | 800 m | MPC · JPL |
| 887665 | 2006 SC_{404} | — | September 30, 2006 | Mount Lemmon | Mount Lemmon Survey | · | 740 m | MPC · JPL |
| 887666 | 2006 SX_{420} | — | April 24, 2009 | Mount Lemmon | Mount Lemmon Survey | · | 1.2 km | MPC · JPL |
| 887667 | 2006 SW_{430} | — | September 28, 2006 | Kitt Peak | Spacewatch | · | 770 m | MPC · JPL |
| 887668 | 2006 SF_{431} | — | September 17, 2006 | Kitt Peak | Spacewatch | · | 1.1 km | MPC · JPL |
| 887669 | 2006 SO_{443} | — | September 17, 2006 | Kitt Peak | Spacewatch | · | 1.2 km | MPC · JPL |
| 887670 | 2006 SV_{443} | — | September 9, 2015 | Haleakala | Pan-STARRS 1 | · | 1.1 km | MPC · JPL |
| 887671 | 2006 SS_{450} | — | September 30, 2006 | Mount Lemmon | Mount Lemmon Survey | V | 420 m | MPC · JPL |
| 887672 | 2006 SH_{452} | — | September 26, 2006 | Mount Lemmon | Mount Lemmon Survey | DOR | 1.4 km | MPC · JPL |
| 887673 | 2006 SM_{453} | — | September 28, 2006 | Mount Lemmon | Mount Lemmon Survey | · | 1.2 km | MPC · JPL |
| 887674 | 2006 SC_{462} | — | September 19, 2006 | Kitt Peak | Spacewatch | · | 390 m | MPC · JPL |
| 887675 | 2006 TX_{8} | — | October 2, 2006 | Mount Lemmon | Mount Lemmon Survey | · | 1.2 km | MPC · JPL |
| 887676 | 2006 TX_{31} | — | September 26, 2006 | Mount Lemmon | Mount Lemmon Survey | · | 1.1 km | MPC · JPL |
| 887677 | 2006 TB_{142} | — | October 13, 2006 | Kitt Peak | Spacewatch | · | 280 m | MPC · JPL |
| 887678 | 2006 UC_{24} | — | September 26, 2006 | Mount Lemmon | Mount Lemmon Survey | · | 1.3 km | MPC · JPL |
| 887679 | 2006 UX_{28} | — | October 16, 2006 | Kitt Peak | Spacewatch | · | 860 m | MPC · JPL |
| 887680 | 2006 UD_{40} | — | October 16, 2006 | Kitt Peak | Spacewatch | V | 390 m | MPC · JPL |
| 887681 | 2006 UX_{92} | — | September 30, 2006 | Mount Lemmon | Mount Lemmon Survey | · | 580 m | MPC · JPL |
| 887682 | 2006 UD_{93} | — | October 18, 2006 | Kitt Peak | Spacewatch | MAS | 450 m | MPC · JPL |
| 887683 | 2006 UP_{128} | — | October 19, 2006 | Kitt Peak | Spacewatch | · | 730 m | MPC · JPL |
| 887684 | 2006 UO_{160} | — | September 19, 2006 | Kitt Peak | Spacewatch | · | 680 m | MPC · JPL |
| 887685 | 2006 UT_{160} | — | October 21, 2006 | Mount Lemmon | Mount Lemmon Survey | · | 1.3 km | MPC · JPL |
| 887686 | 2006 US_{164} | — | October 21, 2006 | Mount Lemmon | Mount Lemmon Survey | V | 410 m | MPC · JPL |
| 887687 | 2006 UC_{171} | — | October 21, 2006 | Mount Lemmon | Mount Lemmon Survey | · | 1.2 km | MPC · JPL |
| 887688 | 2006 UU_{195} | — | September 26, 2006 | Kitt Peak | Spacewatch | MAS | 490 m | MPC · JPL |
| 887689 | 2006 UM_{230} | — | October 21, 2006 | Mount Lemmon | Mount Lemmon Survey | · | 840 m | MPC · JPL |
| 887690 | 2006 UR_{246} | — | September 25, 2006 | Mount Lemmon | Mount Lemmon Survey | · | 690 m | MPC · JPL |
| 887691 | 2006 UW_{247} | — | September 26, 2006 | Mount Lemmon | Mount Lemmon Survey | · | 1.2 km | MPC · JPL |
| 887692 | 2006 UG_{252} | — | October 20, 2006 | Kitt Peak | Spacewatch | VER | 1.9 km | MPC · JPL |
| 887693 | 2006 US_{264} | — | September 18, 2006 | Kitt Peak | Spacewatch | · | 740 m | MPC · JPL |
| 887694 | 2006 UH_{295} | — | October 19, 2006 | Kitt Peak | Deep Ecliptic Survey | · | 1.8 km | MPC · JPL |
| 887695 | 2006 UA_{297} | — | October 19, 2006 | Kitt Peak | Deep Ecliptic Survey | · | 440 m | MPC · JPL |
| 887696 | 2006 UF_{310} | — | September 27, 2006 | Kitt Peak | Spacewatch | MAS | 420 m | MPC · JPL |
| 887697 | 2006 UF_{348} | — | October 26, 2006 | Mauna Kea | P. A. Wiegert | · | 680 m | MPC · JPL |
| 887698 | 2006 UT_{354} | — | October 26, 2006 | Mauna Kea | P. A. Wiegert | · | 730 m | MPC · JPL |
| 887699 | 2006 UP_{375} | — | October 22, 2006 | Kitt Peak | Spacewatch | NYS | 730 m | MPC · JPL |
| 887700 | 2006 US_{378} | — | October 21, 2006 | Kitt Peak | Spacewatch | · | 770 m | MPC · JPL |

== 887701–887800 ==
back to top

| Designation | | | Discovery | | | Properties | | Ref |
| Permanent | Provisional | Named after | Date | Site | Discoverer(s) | Category | Diam. | Ref |
|---|---|---|---|---|---|---|---|---|
| 887701 | 2006 UT_{379} | — | October 21, 2006 | Mount Lemmon | Mount Lemmon Survey | AEO | 810 m | MPC · JPL |
| 887702 | 2006 UQ_{380} | — | October 16, 2006 | Kitt Peak | Spacewatch | AGN | 780 m | MPC · JPL |
| 887703 | 2006 UN_{384} | — | October 19, 2006 | Kitt Peak | Spacewatch | · | 1.0 km | MPC · JPL |
| 887704 | 2006 UE_{387} | — | October 17, 2006 | Kitt Peak | Spacewatch | · | 530 m | MPC · JPL |
| 887705 | 2006 UP_{387} | — | October 27, 2006 | Mount Lemmon | Mount Lemmon Survey | · | 1.2 km | MPC · JPL |
| 887706 | 2006 UQ_{387} | — | October 21, 2006 | Mount Lemmon | Mount Lemmon Survey | GEF | 750 m | MPC · JPL |
| 887707 | 2006 UN_{388} | — | October 21, 2006 | Kitt Peak | Spacewatch | · | 1.3 km | MPC · JPL |
| 887708 | 2006 UO_{393} | — | October 19, 2006 | Kitt Peak | Spacewatch | · | 1.3 km | MPC · JPL |
| 887709 | 2006 VL_{18} | — | October 21, 2006 | Kitt Peak | Spacewatch | · | 1.4 km | MPC · JPL |
| 887710 | 2006 VV_{21} | — | October 22, 2006 | Kitt Peak | Spacewatch | · | 1.0 km | MPC · JPL |
| 887711 | 2006 VY_{40} | — | November 12, 2006 | Mount Lemmon | Mount Lemmon Survey | · | 700 m | MPC · JPL |
| 887712 | 2006 VU_{71} | — | November 11, 2006 | Mount Lemmon | Mount Lemmon Survey | · | 730 m | MPC · JPL |
| 887713 | 2006 VK_{79} | — | October 19, 2006 | Mount Lemmon | Mount Lemmon Survey | DOR | 1.4 km | MPC · JPL |
| 887714 | 2006 VO_{83} | — | November 13, 2006 | Kitt Peak | Spacewatch | H | 300 m | MPC · JPL |
| 887715 | 2006 VM_{92} | — | November 15, 2006 | Catalina | CSS | · | 1.4 km | MPC · JPL |
| 887716 | 2006 VV_{93} | — | November 15, 2006 | Mount Lemmon | Mount Lemmon Survey | · | 450 m | MPC · JPL |
| 887717 | 2006 VQ_{115} | — | November 14, 2006 | Kitt Peak | Spacewatch | BRA | 960 m | MPC · JPL |
| 887718 | 2006 VP_{128} | — | November 15, 2006 | Kitt Peak | Spacewatch | · | 400 m | MPC · JPL |
| 887719 | 2006 VX_{135} | — | November 1, 2006 | Mount Lemmon | Mount Lemmon Survey | · | 660 m | MPC · JPL |
| 887720 | 2006 VZ_{139} | — | October 19, 2006 | Mount Lemmon | Mount Lemmon Survey | · | 1.4 km | MPC · JPL |
| 887721 | 2006 VC_{141} | — | November 15, 2006 | Kitt Peak | Spacewatch | · | 1.3 km | MPC · JPL |
| 887722 | 2006 VU_{172} | — | October 12, 2006 | Kitt Peak | Spacewatch | · | 680 m | MPC · JPL |
| 887723 | 2006 VW_{180} | — | November 1, 2006 | Kitt Peak | Spacewatch | · | 740 m | MPC · JPL |
| 887724 | 2006 VS_{181} | — | May 20, 2018 | Haleakala | Pan-STARRS 1 | · | 1.6 km | MPC · JPL |
| 887725 | 2006 WY_{23} | — | November 17, 2006 | Mount Lemmon | Mount Lemmon Survey | · | 700 m | MPC · JPL |
| 887726 | 2006 WM_{79} | — | November 18, 2006 | Kitt Peak | Spacewatch | NYS | 740 m | MPC · JPL |
| 887727 | 2006 WR_{97} | — | November 19, 2006 | Kitt Peak | Spacewatch | NYS | 800 m | MPC · JPL |
| 887728 | 2006 WD_{120} | — | November 21, 2006 | Mount Lemmon | Mount Lemmon Survey | · | 1.2 km | MPC · JPL |
| 887729 | 2006 WH_{136} | — | November 19, 2006 | Kitt Peak | Spacewatch | · | 1.4 km | MPC · JPL |
| 887730 | 2006 WX_{154} | — | November 22, 2006 | Kitt Peak | Spacewatch | · | 590 m | MPC · JPL |
| 887731 | 2006 WN_{205} | — | November 23, 2006 | Kitt Peak | Spacewatch | · | 1.3 km | MPC · JPL |
| 887732 | 2006 WW_{212} | — | November 19, 2006 | Kitt Peak | Spacewatch | · | 890 m | MPC · JPL |
| 887733 | 2006 WE_{234} | — | November 17, 2006 | Kitt Peak | Spacewatch | DOR | 1.5 km | MPC · JPL |
| 887734 | 2006 WL_{234} | — | November 19, 2006 | Kitt Peak | Spacewatch | · | 1.2 km | MPC · JPL |
| 887735 | 2006 WA_{235} | — | November 18, 2006 | Mount Lemmon | Mount Lemmon Survey | · | 1.2 km | MPC · JPL |
| 887736 | 2006 XM_{23} | — | December 12, 2006 | Mount Lemmon | Mount Lemmon Survey | · | 1.3 km | MPC · JPL |
| 887737 | 2006 XA_{51} | — | November 21, 2006 | Mount Lemmon | Mount Lemmon Survey | H | 520 m | MPC · JPL |
| 887738 | 2006 XV_{58} | — | December 1, 2006 | Mount Lemmon | Mount Lemmon Survey | · | 870 m | MPC · JPL |
| 887739 | 2006 XC_{80} | — | February 7, 2011 | Mount Lemmon | Mount Lemmon Survey | · | 660 m | MPC · JPL |
| 887740 | 2006 YK_{31} | — | December 21, 2006 | Kitt Peak | Spacewatch | · | 530 m | MPC · JPL |
| 887741 | 2006 YA_{40} | — | December 14, 2006 | Kitt Peak | Spacewatch | H | 430 m | MPC · JPL |
| 887742 | 2006 YO_{61} | — | December 24, 2006 | Kitt Peak | Spacewatch | · | 590 m | MPC · JPL |
| 887743 | 2006 YR_{61} | — | December 21, 2006 | Kitt Peak | Spacewatch | H | 270 m | MPC · JPL |
| 887744 | 2006 YA_{64} | — | January 28, 2015 | Haleakala | Pan-STARRS 1 | · | 900 m | MPC · JPL |
| 887745 | 2006 YE_{65} | — | December 21, 2006 | Mount Lemmon | Mount Lemmon Survey | · | 850 m | MPC · JPL |
| 887746 | 2006 YN_{66} | — | September 25, 2011 | Haleakala | Pan-STARRS 1 | H | 330 m | MPC · JPL |
| 887747 | 2006 YN_{69} | — | December 27, 2006 | Mount Lemmon | Mount Lemmon Survey | · | 970 m | MPC · JPL |
| 887748 | 2007 AE_{1} | — | December 24, 2006 | Kitt Peak | Spacewatch | · | 510 m | MPC · JPL |
| 887749 | 2007 AC_{12} | — | January 10, 2007 | Mount Lemmon | Mount Lemmon Survey | T_{j} (2.99) · AMO +1km | 840 m | MPC · JPL |
| 887750 | 2007 AG_{26} | — | January 15, 2007 | Catalina | CSS | H | 410 m | MPC · JPL |
| 887751 | 2007 AG_{37} | — | January 10, 2007 | Mount Lemmon | Mount Lemmon Survey | · | 1.4 km | MPC · JPL |
| 887752 | 2007 BN_{7} | — | January 17, 2007 | Catalina | CSS | H | 440 m | MPC · JPL |
| 887753 | 2007 BP_{13} | — | January 17, 2007 | Kitt Peak | Spacewatch | · | 740 m | MPC · JPL |
| 887754 | 2007 BT_{14} | — | January 17, 2007 | Kitt Peak | Spacewatch | · | 1.0 km | MPC · JPL |
| 887755 | 2007 BX_{32} | — | January 24, 2007 | Mount Lemmon | Mount Lemmon Survey | · | 860 m | MPC · JPL |
| 887756 | 2007 BB_{33} | — | February 14, 2002 | Kitt Peak | Spacewatch | · | 1.4 km | MPC · JPL |
| 887757 | 2007 BL_{39} | — | December 26, 2006 | Kitt Peak | Spacewatch | GEF | 840 m | MPC · JPL |
| 887758 | 2007 BH_{107} | — | January 27, 2007 | Kitt Peak | Spacewatch | · | 680 m | MPC · JPL |
| 887759 | 2007 BJ_{115} | — | January 17, 2007 | Kitt Peak | Spacewatch | · | 850 m | MPC · JPL |
| 887760 | 2007 BX_{119} | — | January 26, 2007 | Kitt Peak | Spacewatch | MAS | 460 m | MPC · JPL |
| 887761 | 2007 BS_{121} | — | January 27, 2007 | Mount Lemmon | Mount Lemmon Survey | KOR | 950 m | MPC · JPL |
| 887762 | 2007 BP_{122} | — | February 7, 2002 | Kitt Peak | Spacewatch | · | 1.2 km | MPC · JPL |
| 887763 | 2007 CA_{21} | — | February 6, 2007 | Mount Lemmon | Mount Lemmon Survey | H | 290 m | MPC · JPL |
| 887764 | 2007 CB_{31} | — | January 27, 2007 | Kitt Peak | Spacewatch | · | 760 m | MPC · JPL |
| 887765 | 2007 CR_{32} | — | February 6, 2007 | Mount Lemmon | Mount Lemmon Survey | MIS | 1.5 km | MPC · JPL |
| 887766 | 2007 CC_{41} | — | February 7, 2007 | Kitt Peak | Spacewatch | · | 1.3 km | MPC · JPL |
| 887767 | 2007 CW_{65} | — | February 7, 2007 | Mount Lemmon | Mount Lemmon Survey | · | 860 m | MPC · JPL |
| 887768 | 2007 CY_{74} | — | February 14, 2007 | Mauna Kea | P. A. Wiegert | · | 1.2 km | MPC · JPL |
| 887769 | 2007 CW_{84} | — | February 10, 2007 | Mount Lemmon | Mount Lemmon Survey | · | 450 m | MPC · JPL |
| 887770 | 2007 CC_{86} | — | February 9, 2007 | Kitt Peak | Spacewatch | · | 420 m | MPC · JPL |
| 887771 | 2007 DW | — | February 17, 2007 | Palomar | NEAT | APO | 300 m | MPC · JPL |
| 887772 | 2007 DT_{1} | — | February 16, 2007 | Mount Lemmon | Mount Lemmon Survey | H | 340 m | MPC · JPL |
| 887773 | 2007 DB_{61} | — | February 25, 2007 | Socorro | LINEAR | ATE | 60 m | MPC · JPL |
| 887774 | 2007 DW_{67} | — | February 17, 2007 | Kitt Peak | Spacewatch | · | 460 m | MPC · JPL |
| 887775 | 2007 DB_{108} | — | February 22, 2007 | Mount Graham | Trilling, D. E. | · | 330 m | MPC · JPL |
| 887776 | 2007 DL_{111} | — | February 25, 2007 | Kitt Peak | Spacewatch | · | 840 m | MPC · JPL |
| 887777 | 2007 DE_{122} | — | March 11, 2007 | Mount Lemmon | Mount Lemmon Survey | NYS | 710 m | MPC · JPL |
| 887778 | 2007 DC_{126} | — | October 2, 2013 | Haleakala | Pan-STARRS 1 | · | 810 m | MPC · JPL |
| 887779 | 2007 DC_{127} | — | February 25, 2007 | Kitt Peak | Spacewatch | · | 450 m | MPC · JPL |
| 887780 | 2007 DN_{127} | — | February 23, 2007 | Mount Lemmon | Mount Lemmon Survey | · | 600 m | MPC · JPL |
| 887781 | 2007 DK_{131} | — | February 26, 2007 | Mount Lemmon | Mount Lemmon Survey | · | 810 m | MPC · JPL |
| 887782 | 2007 DN_{131} | — | February 23, 2007 | Mount Lemmon | Mount Lemmon Survey | · | 780 m | MPC · JPL |
| 887783 | 2007 EY_{29} | — | March 9, 2007 | Kitt Peak | Spacewatch | · | 1.3 km | MPC · JPL |
| 887784 | 2007 EM_{56} | — | March 12, 2007 | Kitt Peak | Spacewatch | · | 820 m | MPC · JPL |
| 887785 | 2007 EU_{56} | — | March 14, 2007 | Kitt Peak | Spacewatch | H | 350 m | MPC · JPL |
| 887786 | 2007 ET_{58} | — | January 29, 2007 | Kitt Peak | Spacewatch | · | 1.4 km | MPC · JPL |
| 887787 | 2007 EW_{66} | — | March 10, 2007 | Kitt Peak | Spacewatch | · | 540 m | MPC · JPL |
| 887788 | 2007 EH_{120} | — | March 13, 2007 | Kitt Peak | Spacewatch | · | 1.2 km | MPC · JPL |
| 887789 | 2007 ER_{151} | — | March 12, 2007 | Mount Lemmon | Mount Lemmon Survey | · | 730 m | MPC · JPL |
| 887790 | 2007 ET_{193} | — | February 26, 2007 | Mount Lemmon | Mount Lemmon Survey | H | 300 m | MPC · JPL |
| 887791 | 2007 EY_{217} | — | March 9, 2007 | Kitt Peak | Spacewatch | · | 460 m | MPC · JPL |
| 887792 | 2007 EE_{230} | — | March 11, 2007 | Mount Lemmon | Mount Lemmon Survey | · | 790 m | MPC · JPL |
| 887793 | 2007 EG_{230} | — | February 17, 2007 | Kitt Peak | Spacewatch | MAS | 570 m | MPC · JPL |
| 887794 | 2007 ED_{232} | — | March 9, 2007 | Mount Lemmon | Mount Lemmon Survey | H | 350 m | MPC · JPL |
| 887795 | 2007 EB_{233} | — | March 10, 2007 | Mount Lemmon | Mount Lemmon Survey | · | 1.3 km | MPC · JPL |
| 887796 | 2007 EN_{233} | — | March 12, 2007 | Mount Lemmon | Mount Lemmon Survey | H | 360 m | MPC · JPL |
| 887797 | 2007 EQ_{233} | — | March 12, 2007 | Kitt Peak | Spacewatch | · | 1.2 km | MPC · JPL |
| 887798 | 2007 EN_{236} | — | July 25, 2014 | Haleakala | Pan-STARRS 1 | · | 1.3 km | MPC · JPL |
| 887799 | 2007 ES_{236} | — | March 10, 2007 | Mount Lemmon | Mount Lemmon Survey | · | 830 m | MPC · JPL |
| 887800 | 2007 EO_{237} | — | March 15, 2007 | Kitt Peak | Spacewatch | MAS | 540 m | MPC · JPL |

== 887801–887900 ==
back to top

| Designation | | | Discovery | | | Properties | | Ref |
| Permanent | Provisional | Named after | Date | Site | Discoverer(s) | Category | Diam. | Ref |
|---|---|---|---|---|---|---|---|---|
| 887801 | 2007 EW_{237} | — | January 4, 2016 | Haleakala | Pan-STARRS 1 | · | 1.3 km | MPC · JPL |
| 887802 | 2007 EY_{238} | — | March 15, 2007 | Kitt Peak | Spacewatch | · | 520 m | MPC · JPL |
| 887803 | 2007 FS_{21} | — | February 25, 2007 | Kitt Peak | Spacewatch | NYS | 750 m | MPC · JPL |
| 887804 | 2007 FX_{40} | — | March 20, 2007 | Kitt Peak | Spacewatch | · | 820 m | MPC · JPL |
| 887805 | 2007 FM_{48} | — | March 16, 2007 | Mount Lemmon | Mount Lemmon Survey | · | 2.1 km | MPC · JPL |
| 887806 | 2007 FN_{60} | — | March 26, 2007 | Mount Lemmon | Mount Lemmon Survey | · | 720 m | MPC · JPL |
| 887807 | 2007 FL_{61} | — | March 16, 2007 | Mount Lemmon | Mount Lemmon Survey | · | 460 m | MPC · JPL |
| 887808 | 2007 FG_{63} | — | March 26, 2007 | Kitt Peak | Spacewatch | · | 1.1 km | MPC · JPL |
| 887809 | 2007 FW_{63} | — | March 9, 2003 | Kitt Peak | Spacewatch | NYS | 880 m | MPC · JPL |
| 887810 | 2007 GV_{20} | — | April 11, 2007 | Mount Lemmon | Mount Lemmon Survey | · | 900 m | MPC · JPL |
| 887811 | 2007 GG_{43} | — | April 14, 2007 | Mount Lemmon | Mount Lemmon Survey | NYS | 780 m | MPC · JPL |
| 887812 | 2007 GZ_{64} | — | April 15, 2007 | Kitt Peak | Spacewatch | · | 790 m | MPC · JPL |
| 887813 | 2007 GN_{69} | — | April 7, 2007 | Mount Lemmon | Mount Lemmon Survey | · | 400 m | MPC · JPL |
| 887814 | 2007 HC_{12} | — | April 18, 2007 | Mount Lemmon | Mount Lemmon Survey | H | 400 m | MPC · JPL |
| 887815 | 2007 HN_{35} | — | April 19, 2007 | Kitt Peak | Spacewatch | · | 760 m | MPC · JPL |
| 887816 | 2007 HS_{62} | — | April 22, 2007 | Mount Lemmon | Mount Lemmon Survey | · | 430 m | MPC · JPL |
| 887817 | 2007 HB_{103} | — | September 9, 2015 | Haleakala | Pan-STARRS 1 | · | 460 m | MPC · JPL |
| 887818 | 2007 HS_{104} | — | April 19, 2007 | Kitt Peak | Spacewatch | H | 420 m | MPC · JPL |
| 887819 | 2007 HX_{106} | — | April 24, 2007 | Kitt Peak | Spacewatch | NYS | 920 m | MPC · JPL |
| 887820 | 2007 HV_{107} | — | December 26, 2014 | Haleakala | Pan-STARRS 1 | HNS | 740 m | MPC · JPL |
| 887821 | 2007 HE_{109} | — | April 22, 2007 | Kitt Peak | Spacewatch | · | 440 m | MPC · JPL |
| 887822 | 2007 JU_{36} | — | May 9, 2007 | Mount Lemmon | Mount Lemmon Survey | H | 380 m | MPC · JPL |
| 887823 | 2007 JX_{49} | — | August 23, 2014 | Haleakala | Pan-STARRS 1 | · | 460 m | MPC · JPL |
| 887824 | 2007 MY_{7} | — | June 18, 2007 | Kitt Peak | Spacewatch | · | 1.6 km | MPC · JPL |
| 887825 | 2007 PE_{8} | — | May 14, 2007 | Siding Spring | SSS | AMO | 460 m | MPC · JPL |
| 887826 | 2007 PO_{55} | — | August 10, 2007 | Kitt Peak | Spacewatch | · | 1.9 km | MPC · JPL |
| 887827 | 2007 QN_{17} | — | August 24, 2007 | Kitt Peak | Spacewatch | · | 970 m | MPC · JPL |
| 887828 | 2007 QK_{21} | — | August 24, 2007 | Kitt Peak | Spacewatch | · | 2.1 km | MPC · JPL |
| 887829 | 2007 RX_{4} | — | September 3, 2007 | Mount Lemmon | Mount Lemmon Survey | H | 250 m | MPC · JPL |
| 887830 | 2007 RW_{44} | — | September 9, 2007 | Kitt Peak | Spacewatch | · | 1.7 km | MPC · JPL |
| 887831 | 2007 RU_{48} | — | September 9, 2007 | Mount Lemmon | Mount Lemmon Survey | · | 910 m | MPC · JPL |
| 887832 | 2007 RE_{63} | — | September 10, 2007 | Mount Lemmon | Mount Lemmon Survey | EOS | 1.3 km | MPC · JPL |
| 887833 | 2007 RU_{89} | — | September 10, 2007 | Mount Lemmon | Mount Lemmon Survey | V | 470 m | MPC · JPL |
| 887834 | 2007 RS_{122} | — | September 12, 2007 | Mount Lemmon | Mount Lemmon Survey | EOS | 1.5 km | MPC · JPL |
| 887835 | 2007 RP_{159} | — | September 12, 2007 | Mount Lemmon | Mount Lemmon Survey | LIX | 2.0 km | MPC · JPL |
| 887836 | 2007 RX_{168} | — | September 10, 2007 | Kitt Peak | Spacewatch | · | 610 m | MPC · JPL |
| 887837 | 2007 RQ_{172} | — | September 10, 2007 | Kitt Peak | Spacewatch | · | 790 m | MPC · JPL |
| 887838 | 2007 RW_{185} | — | September 13, 2007 | Mount Lemmon | Mount Lemmon Survey | · | 990 m | MPC · JPL |
| 887839 | 2007 RM_{217} | — | September 13, 2007 | Kitt Peak | Spacewatch | · | 530 m | MPC · JPL |
| 887840 | 2007 RN_{252} | — | September 13, 2007 | Kitt Peak | Spacewatch | · | 1.2 km | MPC · JPL |
| 887841 | 2007 RE_{331} | — | September 12, 2007 | Mount Lemmon | Mount Lemmon Survey | · | 610 m | MPC · JPL |
| 887842 | 2007 RM_{332} | — | September 14, 2007 | Catalina | CSS | · | 590 m | MPC · JPL |
| 887843 | 2007 RD_{338} | — | September 12, 2007 | Mount Lemmon | Mount Lemmon Survey | · | 630 m | MPC · JPL |
| 887844 | 2007 RV_{343} | — | September 12, 2007 | Mount Lemmon | Mount Lemmon Survey | NYS | 670 m | MPC · JPL |
| 887845 | 2007 RR_{345} | — | January 23, 2015 | Haleakala | Pan-STARRS 1 | · | 1.7 km | MPC · JPL |
| 887846 | 2007 RF_{357} | — | September 10, 2007 | Mount Lemmon | Mount Lemmon Survey | · | 1.1 km | MPC · JPL |
| 887847 | 2007 RX_{360} | — | September 12, 2007 | Mount Lemmon | Mount Lemmon Survey | · | 810 m | MPC · JPL |
| 887848 | 2007 RZ_{360} | — | September 15, 2007 | Mount Lemmon | Mount Lemmon Survey | · | 2.0 km | MPC · JPL |
| 887849 | 2007 RT_{362} | — | September 15, 2007 | Taunus | E. Schwab, R. Kling | · | 1.0 km | MPC · JPL |
| 887850 | 2007 RW_{364} | — | September 14, 2007 | Mount Lemmon | Mount Lemmon Survey | · | 810 m | MPC · JPL |
| 887851 | 2007 RF_{368} | — | September 12, 2007 | Mount Lemmon | Mount Lemmon Survey | · | 1.9 km | MPC · JPL |
| 887852 | 2007 RO_{369} | — | September 13, 2007 | Mount Lemmon | Mount Lemmon Survey | · | 600 m | MPC · JPL |
| 887853 | 2007 RV_{373} | — | September 14, 2007 | Mount Lemmon | Mount Lemmon Survey | AGN | 870 m | MPC · JPL |
| 887854 | 2007 RV_{374} | — | September 12, 2007 | Mount Lemmon | Mount Lemmon Survey | MAS | 460 m | MPC · JPL |
| 887855 | 2007 RR_{375} | — | September 11, 2007 | Mount Lemmon | Mount Lemmon Survey | · | 1.3 km | MPC · JPL |
| 887856 | 2007 RB_{376} | — | September 10, 2007 | Kitt Peak | Spacewatch | · | 1.1 km | MPC · JPL |
| 887857 | 2007 RJ_{378} | — | November 16, 2003 | Kitt Peak | Spacewatch | · | 820 m | MPC · JPL |
| 887858 | 2007 RU_{378} | — | September 13, 2007 | Mount Lemmon | Mount Lemmon Survey | · | 1.2 km | MPC · JPL |
| 887859 | 2007 RJ_{380} | — | September 15, 2007 | Kitt Peak | Spacewatch | NYS | 790 m | MPC · JPL |
| 887860 | 2007 RK_{387} | — | September 11, 2007 | Mount Lemmon | Mount Lemmon Survey | · | 1.2 km | MPC · JPL |
| 887861 | 2007 SJ_{21} | — | September 18, 2007 | Catalina | CSS | · | 1.0 km | MPC · JPL |
| 887862 | 2007 SJ_{29} | — | September 18, 2007 | Kitt Peak | Spacewatch | VER | 1.8 km | MPC · JPL |
| 887863 | 2007 TD_{24} | — | October 11, 2007 | Catalina | CSS | · | 1.1 km | MPC · JPL |
| 887864 | 2007 TD_{42} | — | September 15, 2007 | Mount Lemmon | Mount Lemmon Survey | · | 580 m | MPC · JPL |
| 887865 | 2007 TY_{42} | — | September 14, 2007 | Mount Lemmon | Mount Lemmon Survey | · | 1.9 km | MPC · JPL |
| 887866 | 2007 TU_{78} | — | October 5, 2007 | Kitt Peak | Spacewatch | NYS | 590 m | MPC · JPL |
| 887867 | 2007 TN_{85} | — | September 15, 2007 | Mount Lemmon | Mount Lemmon Survey | PHO | 680 m | MPC · JPL |
| 887868 | 2007 TM_{90} | — | October 8, 2007 | Mount Lemmon | Mount Lemmon Survey | · | 950 m | MPC · JPL |
| 887869 | 2007 TG_{107} | — | October 4, 2007 | Mount Lemmon | Mount Lemmon Survey | EOS | 1.2 km | MPC · JPL |
| 887870 | 2007 TZ_{107} | — | October 6, 2007 | Bergisch Gladbach | W. Bickel | · | 550 m | MPC · JPL |
| 887871 | 2007 TB_{117} | — | September 15, 2007 | Kitt Peak | Spacewatch | · | 1.8 km | MPC · JPL |
| 887872 | 2007 TO_{134} | — | October 7, 2007 | Altschwendt | W. Ries | MAS | 460 m | MPC · JPL |
| 887873 | 2007 TW_{137} | — | October 8, 2007 | Mount Lemmon | Mount Lemmon Survey | · | 2.3 km | MPC · JPL |
| 887874 | 2007 TP_{143} | — | September 15, 2007 | Kitt Peak | Spacewatch | · | 2.3 km | MPC · JPL |
| 887875 | 2007 TV_{190} | — | October 4, 2007 | Mount Lemmon | Mount Lemmon Survey | · | 890 m | MPC · JPL |
| 887876 | 2007 TC_{224} | — | October 10, 2007 | Mount Lemmon | Mount Lemmon Survey | (13314) | 1.2 km | MPC · JPL |
| 887877 | 2007 TP_{224} | — | September 10, 2007 | Mount Lemmon | Mount Lemmon Survey | · | 450 m | MPC · JPL |
| 887878 | 2007 TW_{226} | — | October 8, 2007 | Kitt Peak | Spacewatch | · | 540 m | MPC · JPL |
| 887879 | 2007 TT_{229} | — | October 8, 2007 | Kitt Peak | Spacewatch | · | 750 m | MPC · JPL |
| 887880 | 2007 TP_{230} | — | October 8, 2007 | Kitt Peak | Spacewatch | · | 1.9 km | MPC · JPL |
| 887881 | 2007 TL_{252} | — | October 7, 2007 | Mount Lemmon | Mount Lemmon Survey | · | 860 m | MPC · JPL |
| 887882 | 2007 TC_{266} | — | October 11, 2007 | Kitt Peak | Spacewatch | ERI | 900 m | MPC · JPL |
| 887883 | 2007 TC_{271} | — | October 9, 2007 | Kitt Peak | Spacewatch | NYS | 550 m | MPC · JPL |
| 887884 | 2007 TR_{277} | — | September 14, 2007 | Mount Lemmon | Mount Lemmon Survey | · | 570 m | MPC · JPL |
| 887885 | 2007 TV_{303} | — | October 12, 2007 | Mount Lemmon | Mount Lemmon Survey | · | 680 m | MPC · JPL |
| 887886 | 2007 TV_{321} | — | October 14, 2007 | Kitt Peak | Spacewatch | · | 1.1 km | MPC · JPL |
| 887887 | 2007 TD_{378} | — | October 12, 2007 | Kitt Peak | Spacewatch | T_{j} (2.99) · 3:2 · SHU | 2.8 km | MPC · JPL |
| 887888 | 2007 TW_{393} | — | October 15, 2007 | Kitt Peak | Spacewatch | NYS | 700 m | MPC · JPL |
| 887889 | 2007 TP_{405} | — | October 15, 2007 | Kitt Peak | Spacewatch | · | 600 m | MPC · JPL |
| 887890 | 2007 TE_{424} | — | October 7, 2007 | Mount Lemmon | Mount Lemmon Survey | · | 930 m | MPC · JPL |
| 887891 | 2007 TG_{459} | — | October 15, 2007 | Mount Lemmon | Mount Lemmon Survey | · | 1.4 km | MPC · JPL |
| 887892 | 2007 TQ_{471} | — | October 12, 2007 | Kitt Peak | Spacewatch | NYS | 620 m | MPC · JPL |
| 887893 | 2007 TX_{471} | — | December 28, 2011 | Mount Lemmon | Mount Lemmon Survey | (2076) | 520 m | MPC · JPL |
| 887894 | 2007 TO_{472} | — | October 9, 2007 | Kitt Peak | Spacewatch | · | 2.0 km | MPC · JPL |
| 887895 | 2007 TG_{476} | — | January 20, 2012 | Catalina | CSS | · | 480 m | MPC · JPL |
| 887896 | 2007 TZ_{476} | — | July 29, 2014 | Haleakala | Pan-STARRS 1 | NYS | 750 m | MPC · JPL |
| 887897 | 2007 TX_{488} | — | October 4, 2007 | Mount Lemmon | Mount Lemmon Survey | · | 500 m | MPC · JPL |
| 887898 | 2007 TE_{493} | — | October 4, 2007 | Catalina | CSS | · | 790 m | MPC · JPL |
| 887899 | 2007 TK_{494} | — | October 15, 2007 | Mount Lemmon | Mount Lemmon Survey | EUN | 780 m | MPC · JPL |
| 887900 | 2007 TL_{496} | — | January 27, 2015 | Haleakala | Pan-STARRS 1 | VER | 1.6 km | MPC · JPL |

== 887901–888000 ==
back to top

| Designation | | | Discovery | | | Properties | | Ref |
| Permanent | Provisional | Named after | Date | Site | Discoverer(s) | Category | Diam. | Ref |
|---|---|---|---|---|---|---|---|---|
| 887901 | 2007 TA_{500} | — | October 13, 2007 | Kitt Peak | Spacewatch | · | 2.3 km | MPC · JPL |
| 887902 | 2007 TM_{504} | — | October 10, 2007 | Kitt Peak | Spacewatch | · | 1.2 km | MPC · JPL |
| 887903 | 2007 TO_{504} | — | October 8, 2007 | Mount Lemmon | Mount Lemmon Survey | · | 490 m | MPC · JPL |
| 887904 | 2007 TZ_{504} | — | October 9, 2007 | Mount Lemmon | Mount Lemmon Survey | · | 910 m | MPC · JPL |
| 887905 | 2007 TS_{511} | — | October 9, 2007 | Mount Lemmon | Mount Lemmon Survey | · | 530 m | MPC · JPL |
| 887906 | 2007 TD_{512} | — | October 9, 2007 | Mount Lemmon | Mount Lemmon Survey | · | 1.8 km | MPC · JPL |
| 887907 | 2007 TD_{514} | — | October 14, 2007 | Mount Lemmon | Mount Lemmon Survey | · | 590 m | MPC · JPL |
| 887908 | 2007 UJ_{17} | — | October 7, 2007 | Mount Lemmon | Mount Lemmon Survey | · | 880 m | MPC · JPL |
| 887909 | 2007 UZ_{19} | — | October 18, 2007 | Mount Lemmon | Mount Lemmon Survey | · | 970 m | MPC · JPL |
| 887910 | 2007 UH_{20} | — | September 12, 2007 | Mount Lemmon | Mount Lemmon Survey | · | 1.7 km | MPC · JPL |
| 887911 | 2007 UP_{67} | — | October 8, 2007 | Mount Lemmon | Mount Lemmon Survey | · | 910 m | MPC · JPL |
| 887912 | 2007 UH_{70} | — | October 30, 2007 | Mount Lemmon | Mount Lemmon Survey | · | 880 m | MPC · JPL |
| 887913 | 2007 UD_{82} | — | October 30, 2007 | Kitt Peak | Spacewatch | TIR | 2.0 km | MPC · JPL |
| 887914 | 2007 UE_{85} | — | September 18, 2007 | Mount Lemmon | Mount Lemmon Survey | · | 980 m | MPC · JPL |
| 887915 | 2007 UK_{97} | — | October 30, 2007 | Mount Lemmon | Mount Lemmon Survey | · | 2.0 km | MPC · JPL |
| 887916 | 2007 UC_{98} | — | October 30, 2007 | Mount Lemmon | Mount Lemmon Survey | MAS | 450 m | MPC · JPL |
| 887917 | 2007 UC_{132} | — | October 18, 2007 | Kitt Peak | Spacewatch | · | 1.3 km | MPC · JPL |
| 887918 | 2007 UF_{144} | — | October 18, 2007 | Mount Lemmon | Mount Lemmon Survey | · | 1.9 km | MPC · JPL |
| 887919 | 2007 UV_{147} | — | October 31, 2007 | Mount Lemmon | Mount Lemmon Survey | · | 680 m | MPC · JPL |
| 887920 | 2007 UP_{153} | — | July 31, 2014 | Haleakala | Pan-STARRS 1 | · | 670 m | MPC · JPL |
| 887921 | 2007 UC_{160} | — | October 18, 2007 | Kitt Peak | Spacewatch | PAD | 1.2 km | MPC · JPL |
| 887922 | 2007 UY_{160} | — | October 31, 2007 | Mount Lemmon | Mount Lemmon Survey | · | 1.0 km | MPC · JPL |
| 887923 | 2007 US_{161} | — | October 18, 2007 | Kitt Peak | Spacewatch | · | 840 m | MPC · JPL |
| 887924 | 2007 UP_{163} | — | October 30, 2007 | Kitt Peak | Spacewatch | · | 1.3 km | MPC · JPL |
| 887925 | 2007 UG_{164} | — | October 21, 2007 | Kitt Peak | Spacewatch | · | 1.4 km | MPC · JPL |
| 887926 | 2007 UO_{165} | — | October 12, 2007 | Kitt Peak | Spacewatch | · | 880 m | MPC · JPL |
| 887927 | 2007 UP_{165} | — | October 20, 2007 | Kitt Peak | Spacewatch | · | 1.3 km | MPC · JPL |
| 887928 | 2007 UT_{165} | — | October 18, 2007 | Mount Lemmon | Mount Lemmon Survey | · | 960 m | MPC · JPL |
| 887929 | 2007 UG_{166} | — | October 17, 2007 | Mount Lemmon | Mount Lemmon Survey | ADE | 1.5 km | MPC · JPL |
| 887930 | 2007 UM_{168} | — | October 20, 2007 | Mount Lemmon | Mount Lemmon Survey | · | 510 m | MPC · JPL |
| 887931 | 2007 UH_{170} | — | October 20, 2007 | Mount Lemmon | Mount Lemmon Survey | · | 600 m | MPC · JPL |
| 887932 | 2007 VJ_{10} | — | November 5, 2007 | Mount Lemmon | Mount Lemmon Survey | · | 960 m | MPC · JPL |
| 887933 | 2007 VD_{23} | — | November 2, 2007 | Mount Lemmon | Mount Lemmon Survey | AGN | 790 m | MPC · JPL |
| 887934 | 2007 VE_{29} | — | November 3, 2007 | Mount Lemmon | Mount Lemmon Survey | · | 470 m | MPC · JPL |
| 887935 | 2007 VB_{44} | — | September 10, 2007 | Mount Lemmon | Mount Lemmon Survey | · | 1.2 km | MPC · JPL |
| 887936 | 2007 VY_{44} | — | September 27, 2007 | Mount Lemmon | Mount Lemmon Survey | · | 580 m | MPC · JPL |
| 887937 | 2007 VZ_{50} | — | November 1, 2007 | Kitt Peak | Spacewatch | · | 1.0 km | MPC · JPL |
| 887938 | 2007 VK_{51} | — | November 1, 2007 | Kitt Peak | Spacewatch | · | 1.0 km | MPC · JPL |
| 887939 | 2007 VS_{77} | — | October 20, 2007 | Kitt Peak | Spacewatch | · | 1.2 km | MPC · JPL |
| 887940 | 2007 VP_{79} | — | November 3, 2007 | Kitt Peak | Spacewatch | MAS | 590 m | MPC · JPL |
| 887941 | 2007 VW_{80} | — | November 4, 2007 | Kitt Peak | Spacewatch | · | 640 m | MPC · JPL |
| 887942 | 2007 VM_{93} | — | November 3, 2007 | Socorro | LINEAR | PHO | 740 m | MPC · JPL |
| 887943 | 2007 VT_{102} | — | October 8, 2007 | Mount Lemmon | Mount Lemmon Survey | · | 1.2 km | MPC · JPL |
| 887944 | 2007 VA_{125} | — | November 5, 2007 | Kitt Peak | Spacewatch | JUN | 750 m | MPC · JPL |
| 887945 | 2007 VH_{144} | — | November 4, 2007 | Kitt Peak | Spacewatch | · | 1.3 km | MPC · JPL |
| 887946 | 2007 VN_{175} | — | November 4, 2007 | Mount Lemmon | Mount Lemmon Survey | · | 530 m | MPC · JPL |
| 887947 | 2007 VK_{186} | — | November 12, 2007 | Catalina | CSS | · | 1.0 km | MPC · JPL |
| 887948 | 2007 VM_{189} | — | November 7, 2007 | Mount Lemmon | Mount Lemmon Survey | · | 2.3 km | MPC · JPL |
| 887949 | 2007 VU_{200} | — | October 30, 2007 | Mount Lemmon | Mount Lemmon Survey | · | 1.2 km | MPC · JPL |
| 887950 | 2007 VS_{210} | — | October 18, 2007 | Kitt Peak | Spacewatch | · | 2.1 km | MPC · JPL |
| 887951 | 2007 VO_{226} | — | November 9, 2007 | Mount Lemmon | Mount Lemmon Survey | THB | 2.1 km | MPC · JPL |
| 887952 | 2007 VC_{249} | — | November 14, 2007 | Mount Lemmon | Mount Lemmon Survey | · | 2.2 km | MPC · JPL |
| 887953 | 2007 VC_{250} | — | November 14, 2007 | Mount Lemmon | Mount Lemmon Survey | EUN | 800 m | MPC · JPL |
| 887954 | 2007 VL_{282} | — | October 20, 2007 | Mount Lemmon | Mount Lemmon Survey | EUN | 710 m | MPC · JPL |
| 887955 | 2007 VF_{283} | — | November 14, 2007 | Kitt Peak | Spacewatch | · | 1.1 km | MPC · JPL |
| 887956 | 2007 VM_{300} | — | October 11, 2007 | Catalina | CSS | · | 1.6 km | MPC · JPL |
| 887957 | 2007 VA_{321} | — | November 3, 2007 | Mount Lemmon | Mount Lemmon Survey | JUN | 840 m | MPC · JPL |
| 887958 | 2007 VB_{333} | — | November 9, 2007 | Kitt Peak | Spacewatch | · | 650 m | MPC · JPL |
| 887959 | 2007 VB_{357} | — | November 9, 2007 | Kitt Peak | Spacewatch | · | 680 m | MPC · JPL |
| 887960 | 2007 VE_{357} | — | November 2, 2007 | Kitt Peak | Spacewatch | · | 540 m | MPC · JPL |
| 887961 | 2007 VS_{358} | — | January 25, 2015 | Haleakala | Pan-STARRS 1 | · | 2.1 km | MPC · JPL |
| 887962 | 2007 VP_{361} | — | October 16, 2007 | Mount Lemmon | Mount Lemmon Survey | MAS | 500 m | MPC · JPL |
| 887963 | 2007 VE_{365} | — | November 14, 2007 | Kitt Peak | Spacewatch | · | 590 m | MPC · JPL |
| 887964 | 2007 VP_{365} | — | November 7, 2007 | Kitt Peak | Spacewatch | URS | 2.1 km | MPC · JPL |
| 887965 | 2007 VE_{370} | — | November 14, 2007 | Mount Lemmon | Mount Lemmon Survey | · | 820 m | MPC · JPL |
| 887966 | 2007 VG_{371} | — | November 5, 2007 | Kitt Peak | Spacewatch | · | 1.2 km | MPC · JPL |
| 887967 | 2007 VG_{372} | — | November 2, 2007 | Kitt Peak | Spacewatch | · | 1.0 km | MPC · JPL |
| 887968 | 2007 VC_{375} | — | November 2, 2007 | Mount Lemmon | Mount Lemmon Survey | · | 2.0 km | MPC · JPL |
| 887969 | 2007 VP_{378} | — | November 3, 2007 | Kitt Peak | Spacewatch | · | 530 m | MPC · JPL |
| 887970 | 2007 VQ_{386} | — | November 9, 2007 | Mount Lemmon | Mount Lemmon Survey | · | 510 m | MPC · JPL |
| 887971 | 2007 VO_{388} | — | November 9, 2007 | Mount Lemmon | Mount Lemmon Survey | · | 1.9 km | MPC · JPL |
| 887972 | 2007 WH | — | September 9, 2007 | Mount Lemmon | Mount Lemmon Survey | NYS | 730 m | MPC · JPL |
| 887973 | 2007 WZ_{9} | — | November 3, 2007 | Mount Lemmon | Mount Lemmon Survey | · | 2.1 km | MPC · JPL |
| 887974 | 2007 WD_{26} | — | November 18, 2007 | Mount Lemmon | Mount Lemmon Survey | NYS | 790 m | MPC · JPL |
| 887975 | 2007 WX_{31} | — | November 9, 2007 | Kitt Peak | Spacewatch | ADE | 1.2 km | MPC · JPL |
| 887976 | 2007 WY_{44} | — | November 20, 2007 | Mount Lemmon | Mount Lemmon Survey | · | 900 m | MPC · JPL |
| 887977 | 2007 WT_{61} | — | November 17, 2007 | Kitt Peak | Spacewatch | ADE | 1.4 km | MPC · JPL |
| 887978 | 2007 WN_{71} | — | August 26, 2012 | Haleakala | Pan-STARRS 1 | VER | 1.8 km | MPC · JPL |
| 887979 | 2007 XC_{3} | — | November 9, 2007 | Kitt Peak | Spacewatch | · | 1.1 km | MPC · JPL |
| 887980 | 2007 XA_{64} | — | December 4, 2007 | Kitt Peak | Spacewatch | · | 1.4 km | MPC · JPL |
| 887981 | 2007 XB_{67} | — | December 5, 2007 | Mount Lemmon | Mount Lemmon Survey | · | 770 m | MPC · JPL |
| 887982 | 2007 XA_{70} | — | December 5, 2007 | Kitt Peak | Spacewatch | · | 1.0 km | MPC · JPL |
| 887983 | 2007 XS_{71} | — | December 5, 2007 | Mount Lemmon | Mount Lemmon Survey | NYS | 650 m | MPC · JPL |
| 887984 | 2007 YE_{31} | — | November 16, 1998 | Kitt Peak | Spacewatch | · | 1.1 km | MPC · JPL |
| 887985 | 2007 YG_{31} | — | December 19, 2007 | Kitt Peak | Spacewatch | · | 1.1 km | MPC · JPL |
| 887986 | 2007 YN_{36} | — | December 30, 2007 | Mount Lemmon | Mount Lemmon Survey | · | 1.0 km | MPC · JPL |
| 887987 | 2007 YZ_{58} | — | December 31, 2007 | Mount Lemmon | Mount Lemmon Survey | APO | 390 m | MPC · JPL |
| 887988 | 2007 YY_{66} | — | December 30, 2007 | Kitt Peak | Spacewatch | · | 790 m | MPC · JPL |
| 887989 | 2007 YF_{69} | — | December 19, 2007 | Kitt Peak | Spacewatch | · | 630 m | MPC · JPL |
| 887990 | 2007 YD_{77} | — | December 20, 2007 | Mount Lemmon | Mount Lemmon Survey | · | 520 m | MPC · JPL |
| 887991 | 2007 YU_{77} | — | December 31, 2007 | Mount Lemmon | Mount Lemmon Survey | JUN | 770 m | MPC · JPL |
| 887992 | 2007 YN_{81} | — | December 17, 2007 | Kitt Peak | Spacewatch | · | 610 m | MPC · JPL |
| 887993 | 2007 YV_{82} | — | December 30, 2007 | Kitt Peak | Spacewatch | MAS | 530 m | MPC · JPL |
| 887994 | 2007 YW_{84} | — | December 31, 2007 | Mount Lemmon | Mount Lemmon Survey | · | 1.3 km | MPC · JPL |
| 887995 | 2007 YP_{87} | — | September 15, 2010 | Mount Lemmon | Mount Lemmon Survey | V | 390 m | MPC · JPL |
| 887996 | 2007 YV_{87} | — | December 31, 2007 | Mount Lemmon | Mount Lemmon Survey | · | 740 m | MPC · JPL |
| 887997 | 2007 YX_{94} | — | December 16, 2007 | Mount Lemmon | Mount Lemmon Survey | · | 1.1 km | MPC · JPL |
| 887998 | 2007 YE_{96} | — | December 17, 2007 | Mount Lemmon | Mount Lemmon Survey | · | 830 m | MPC · JPL |
| 887999 | 2007 YQ_{97} | — | December 30, 2007 | Mount Lemmon | Mount Lemmon Survey | · | 600 m | MPC · JPL |
| 888000 | 2007 YG_{98} | — | December 30, 2007 | Kitt Peak | Spacewatch | · | 1.1 km | MPC · JPL |

back to top

== See also ==
- Meanings of minor-planet names: 887001–888000
