= David D. Balam =

Canadian astronomer

Minor planets discovered: 106
see § List of discovered minor planets

David D. Balam /ˈbeɪləm/ is a Canadian astronomer and a research associate with University of Victoria's Department of Physics and Astronomy, in Victoria, British Columbia. Specializing in the search for Near-Earth objects, as of 1998 Balam was one of the world's most prolific contributors to this research. As of 2007, only two astronomers have had made more such discoveries than Balam. As of October 2025, he is credited with the discovery or co-discovery of 108 asteroids. He has discovered over a thousand extra-galactic supernovae, and novae in the galaxy M31. Balam is also co-credited for the 1997 discovery of Comet Zhu-Balam.

Among celestial bodies discovered by Balam are the asteroid 150145 Uvic, which he named for the University of Victoria, and 197856 Tafelmusik, named for the Baroque orchestra in Toronto. Currently, Balam conducts an optical transient survey (OTS) using the 1.82-m Plaskett Telescope of the National Research Council of Canada.

The asteroid 3749 Balam is named in his honour, recognizing the fact that he developed most of the software for the university's astrometric program on minor planets and comets.

== List of discovered minor planets ==
4789 Sprattia	20 October 1987	list
6532 Scarfe	4 January 1995	list
7886 Redman	12 August 1993	list
11955 Russrobb	8 February 1994	list
20106 Morton	20 August 1995	list
29348 Criswick	28 March 1995	list
39791 Jameshesser	13 August 1997	list
48774 Anngower	10 August 1997	list
54411 Bobestelle	3 June 2000	list^{[A]}
60622 Pritchet	30 March 2000	list
81915 Hartwick	15 July 2000	list
100416 Syang	2 February 1996	list
100596 Perrett	9 August 1997	list
150145 Uvic	23 January 1996	list
154660 Kavelaars	29 March 2004	list
157194 Saddlemyer	21 August 2004	list
168358 Casca	24 February 1996	list
197856 Tafelmusik	21 August 2004	list
202740 Vicsympho	11 June 2007	list
(217670) 1998 UQ_{6}	22 October 1998	list
241090 Nemet	23 October 2006	list
246238 Crampton	5 September 2007	list
255703 Stetson	25 August 2006	list
(256550) 2007 LV_{14}	11 June 2007	list
(262002) 2006 QE_{57}	23 August 2006	list

273987 Greggwade	11 June 2007	list
288478 Fahlman	16 March 2004	list
292051 Bohlender	14 September 2006	list
293878 Tapping	9 September 2007	list
304233 Majaess	14 September 2006	list
308825 Siksika	14 September 2006	list
314988 Sireland	13 December 2006	list
315012 Hutchings	20 January 2007	list
315186 Schade	11 June 2007	list
332324 Bobmcdonald	12 December 2006	list
345842 Alexparker	12 June 2007	list
350185 Linnell	3 June 2006	list
(352102) 2007 AG_{12}	13 January 2007	list
(353349) 2010 VT_{103}	9 September 2007	list^{[B]}
353730 Patton	25 November 2005	list^{[C]}
353817 Bolduc-Duval	15 September 1995	list
(356450) 2010 XF_{85}	11 June 2007	list^{[B]}
358376 Gwyn	13 December 2006	list
(359945) 2012 AR_{8}	12 June 2007	list^{[B]}
362793 Suetolson	23 August 2006	list
376299 Friesen	15 December 2004	list^{[C]}
378204 Bettyhesser	26 December 2006	list
380480 Glennhawley	16 December 2003	list
381260 Ouellette	11 October 2007	list
383417 DAO	23 October 2006	list

402920 Tsawout	7 October 2007	list
414026 Bochonko	11 June 2007	list
423097 Richardjarrell	16 December 2003	list
427695 Johnpazder	16 March 2004	list
(428347) 2007 LR_{30}	11 June 2007	list
433763 Helenkirk	31 October 1995	list
475802 Zurek	13 December 2006	list
497700 MacDougall	26 April 2004	list
516560 Annapolisroyal	12 December 2006	list
541801 Kendurkar	16 March 2004	list
(542323) 2013 CR_{12}	24 July 2007	list^{[B]}
(542352) 2013 CE_{44}	9 September 2007	list^{[B]}
542568 Erichess	27 November 2006	list^{[B]}
(542762) 2013 HU_{77}	5 August 2005	list^{[C]}
542857 Elmi	26 December 2006	list^{[B]}
549676 Thanjavur	16 March 2004	list
550139 Venn	18 September 2006	list
550666 Difrancesco	23 October 2006	list
554979 Michaelmazur	26 April 2004	list^{[C]}
(555816) 2014 EV_{46}	10 August 2005	list^{[C]}
(563285) 2016 CS_{107}	23 March 2007	list^{[B]}
(564052) 2016 FY_{1}	22 November 2006	list^{[B]}
565039 Meganengel	15 December 2004	list^{[C]}
(566277) 2017 RN_{76}	18 September 2006	list
568092 Alexschmid	29 August 2003	list

568959 Michaellesko	16 January 2005	list^{[C]}
(569196) 2005 PK_{27}	10 August 2005	list^{[C]}
571000 Kowright	26 December 2006	list^{[B]}
571117 Mikehudson	13 December 2006	list^{[B]}
571398 Jasonrowe	11 June 2007	list^{[B]}
(574548) 2010 RQ_{183}	7 April 2007	list^{[B]}
576186 Lefebvre	20 January 2007	list^{[B]}
578249 Josephcarr	16 March 2004	list
(580374) 2015 BL_{334}	23 March 2007	list^{[B]}
(582481) 2015 VA_{34}	16 March 2004	list
(582810) 2016 BF_{78}	21 August 2004	list
(583254) 2016 FC_{25}	24 May 2000	list^{[D]}
(583418) 2016 GW_{202}	24 July 2007	list^{[B]}
(585802) 2019 JK_{11}	16 January 2005	list^{[C]}
(586646) 2004 HE_{77}	26 April 2004	list^{[C]}
587299 Holmgren	25 November 2005	list^{[C]}
(588074) 2007 GD_{72}	11 April 2007	list^{[B]}
590377 Lisacampbell	21 January 2007	list^{[B]}
594983 Stéphaniecôté	24 May 2000	list^{[D]}
595583 Annabelkarun	31 July 2003	list^{[B]}
(595922) 2004 QQ_{16}	21 August 2004	list
596687 Patrickcôté	7 January 2006	list
(597240) 2006 WO_{28}	22 November 2006	list
(597469) 2007 GV_{71}	7 April 2007	list
(597470) 2007 GG_{72}	15 April 2007	list

(597550) 2007 OT_{8}	24 July 2007	list^{[B]}
(599257) 2009 UC_{170}	11 June 2007	list^{[B]}
(603320) 2015 BU_{355}	21 August 2004	list
(604213) 2015 MX_{111}	24 November 2006	list^{[B]}
(604429) 2015 PD_{274}	12 June 2007	list^{[B]}
(605186) 2016 EN_{10}	11 June 2007	list^{[B]}
611064 Jeroenstil	14 September 2006	list
611326 Wilfredbuck	23 October 2006	list
611585 Bergbusch	20 January 2007	list^{[B]}
611586 Tsartlip	23 January 2007	list^{[B]}
611587 Tseycum	23 January 2007	list^{[B]}
611980 Pauquachin	11 June 2007	list^{[B]}
612163 Thelowes	3 June 2000	list^{[A]}
616184 Malahat	5 August 2005	list^{[C]}
617403 Boley	16 January 2005	list^{[C]}
618051 Sawicki	16 December 2003	list
(618090) 2006 UC_{370}	23 October 2006	list
(618241) 2007 EG_{201}	13 March 2007	list^{[B]}
(618421) 2000 KG_{84}	24 May 2000	list^{[D]}
(618990) 2005 BW_{47}	16 January 2005	list^{[C]}
(619392) 2003 QJ_{116}	29 August 2003	list
(619631) 2005 PC_{28}	10 August 2005	list^{[C]}
(619632) 2005 PF_{28}	10 August 2005	list^{[C]}
(620539) 2004 XJ_{189}	15 December 2004	list^{[C]}
(624505) 2003 QR_{115}	21 August 2003	list^{[B]}

(624506) 2003 QY_{115}	21 August 2003	list^{[B]}
(626003) 2006 UX_{216}	23 October 2006	list
(626389) 2007 LX_{30}	11 June 2007	list^{[B]}
(626466) 2007 RZ_{311}	9 September 2007	list^{[B]}
(629820) 2003 YV_{176}	16 December 2003	list
(629988) 2004 QF_{16}	21 August 2004	list
(630095) 2004 XO_{190}	15 December 2004	list^{[C]}
(630846) 2006 RG_{3}	14 September 2006	list
(631019) 2006 TM_{58}	11 October 2006	list
(631085) 2006 UV_{216}	23 October 2006	list
(631096) 2006 UM_{290}	31 October 2006	list
(631268) 2006 XP_{67}	13 December 2006	list^{[B]}
(631620) 2007 RK_{274}	5 September 2007	list^{[B]}
(632763) 2008 VB_{38}	16 January 2005	list^{[C]}
(632769) 2008 VF_{60}	16 January 2005	list^{[C]}
(637205) 2015 DK_{75}	16 January 2005	list^{[C]}
(638180) 2015 UE	20 March 2007	list^{[B]}
(638570) 2016 BS_{49}	11 October 1999	list
(640272) 2000 KA_{84}	24 May 2000	list^{[D]}
(642279) 2005 PP_{27}	10 August 2005	list^{[C]}
(643057) 2005 WH_{209}	25 November 2005	list^{[C]}
(644854) 2006 YH_{49}	26 December 2006	list^{[B]}
(644922) 2007 BS_{30}	17 January 2007	list^{[B]}
(644923) 2007 BZ_{30}	20 January 2007	list^{[B]}
(645190) 2007 FR_{34}	17 March 2007	list^{[B]}

(645192) 2007 FK_{40}	20 March 2007	list^{[B]}
(649513) 2011 HM_{45}	13 December 2006	list^{[B]}
(650432) 2012 KE_{20}	21 August 2003	list^{[B]}
(652917) 2014 GY_{50}	1 November 2005	list^{[C]}
(653289) 2014 NR_{53}	13 January 2007	list^{[B]}
(653759) 2014 TE_{5}	26 April 2004	list^{[C]}
(655840) 2015 RY_{166}	27 November 2006	list^{[B]}
(656200) 2015 XK_{208}	3 June 2006	list
(658758) 2017 UV_{36}	24 May 2000	list^{[D]}
(658823) 2017 VB_{19}	11 June 2007	list^{[B]}
(658880) 2017 WV_{63}	5 August 2005	list^{[C]}
660931 Antonpetrov	31 July 2003	list^{[B]}
661786 Aikman	10 August 2005	list^{[C]}
662131 Kierancarroll	27 October 2005	list^{[C]}
(662372) 2006 AR_{102}	7 January 2006	list^{[C]}
(662861) 2006 UM_{2}	26 April 2004	list^{[C]}
(663372) 2007 GR_{71}	7 April 2007	list^{[B]}
(669961) 2013 EX_{12}	24 July 2007	list^{[B]}
(670419) 2013 RO_{34}	16 December 2003	list
(675213) 2015 VU	1 November 2005	list^{[C]}
(681093) 2004 HA_{76}	26 April 2004	list^{[C]}
(681094) 2004 HU_{76}	26 April 2004	list^{[C]}
(681327) 2005 BP_{47}	16 January 2005	list^{[C]}
(681526) 2005 OB_{30}	31 July 2005	list^{[C]}
(682008) 2006 AB_{103}	7 January 2006	list^{[C]}

(682009) 2006 AR_{103}	7 January 2006	list^{[C]}
(682713) 2006 XS_{67}	13 December 2006	list^{[B]}
(683232) 2007 RC_{275}	9 September 2007	list^{[B]}
(684364) 2008 SH_{310}	31 July 2003	list^{[B]}
(690668) 2014 KH_{36}	5 September 2007	list^{[B]}
(691183) 2014 OA_{291}	5 September 2007	list^{[B]}
(694196) 2015 QF_{7}	16 January 2005	list^{[C]}
700818 Pauldelaney	31 July 2003	list
(701513) 2005 BL_{38}	16 December 2003	list
701781 Dougjohnstone	5 August 2005	list^{[C]}
(703313) 2007 LZ_{30}	12 June 2007	list^{[B]}
(705453) 2009 BS_{155}	17 March 2004	list
707242 Denniscrabtree	29 August 2003	list
(707844) 2011 SV_{99}	11 October 2006	list
708341 Fredjudson	22 November 2006	list^{[B]}
(710265) 2013 RS_{82}	13 March 2007	list^{[B]}
(711418) 2014 OA_{139}	16 March 2004	list
711824 Infante	29 August 2003	list
(716536) 2016 CR_{236}	11 June 2007	list^{[B]}
(720272) 2000 KH_{84}	24 May 2000	list^{[D]}
(720378) 2001 DW_{111}	15 February 2001	list
(721671) 2003 YL_{176}	16 December 2003	list
(721827) 2004 HU_{77}	26 April 2004	list^{[C]}
(721996) 2004 XD_{189}	15 December 2004	list^{[C]}
(722335) 2005 PF_{25}	5 August 2005	list^{[C]}

(722589) 2005 VW_{134}	1 November 2005	list^{[C]}
(723798) 2007 LA_{30}	11 June 2007	list^{[B]}
(723799) 2007 LL_{30}	11 June 2007	list^{[B]}
(723800) 2007 LD_{31}	12 June 2007	list^{[B]}
(723918) 2007 RM_{274}	9 September 2007	list^{[B]}
730891 Patrickdowler	3 March 2001	list
731124 Rosvick	21 August 2003	list^{[B]}
732472 Grahamhill	8 August 2007	list^{[B]}
732821 Raycarlberg	25 November 2005	list^{[C]}
734551 Monin	7 April 1997	list
737028 Steinbring	16 March 2004	list
740495 Langill	21 August 2003	list^{[B]}
741306 Marshallmccall	27 October 2005	list^{[C]}
(741443) 2006 AQ_{102}	7 January 2006	list^{[C]}
741444 Abbasi	7 January 2006	list^{[C]}
741647 Davidge	23 August 2006	list
741718 Simard	18 September 2006	list
741821 Lewisknee	11 October 2006	list
745492 Saanich	29 August 2003	list^{[B]}
(751865) 2015 HT_{132}	11 June 2007	list^{[B]}
756832 Balogh	11 October 1999	list
757109 Donaldmoffatt	24 May 2000	list^{[D]}
(757719) 2004 XJ_{190}	15 December 2004	list^{[C]}
(757876) 2005 OD_{30}	31 July 2005	list^{[C]}
(758944) 2007 LU_{30}	11 June 2007	list^{[B]}

(758956) 2007 OM_{8}	24 July 2007	list^{[B]}
(758963) 2007 PL_{41}	8 August 2007	list^{[B]}
(768708) 2015 EQ_{70}	31 July 2005	list^{[C]}
(774442) 2004 FZ_{16}	16 March 2004	list
(774443) 2004 FC_{17}	16 March 2004	list
(774472) 2004 HL_{77}	26 April 2004	list^{[C]}
(774721) 2005 PT_{27}	10 August 2005	list^{[C]}
(774977) 2005 WQ_{209}	25 November 2005	list^{[C]}
(775904) 2007 LJ_{30}	11 June 2007	list^{[B]}
(793509) 2003 YF_{176}	16 December 2003	list
(793511) 2003 YB_{177}	16 December 2003	list
(793566) 2004 HT_{76}	26 April 2004	list^{[C]}
(793568) 2004 HF_{77}	26 April 2004	list^{[C]}
(793791) 2005 OT_{30}	31 July 2005	list^{[C]}
(793797) 2005 PL_{26}	5 August 2005	list^{[C]}
(794078) 2005 VQ_{134}	1 November 2005	list^{[C]}
(794110) 2005 WX_{209}	25 November 2005	list^{[C]}
(794375) 2006 SZ_{24}	18 September 2006	list
(794603) 2006 WR_{27}	21 November 2006	list^{[B]}
(794827) 2007 LC_{30}	11 June 2007	list^{[B]}
(794923) 2007 TM_{166}	11 October 2007	list^{[B]}
(817844) 2012 VM_{58}	7 January 2006	list^{[C]}
(826930) 1997 RN_{7}	10 September 1997	list^{[E]}
(827136) 2000 KX_{83}	24 May 2000	list^{[D]}
(827137) 2000 LH_{2}	3 June 2000	list^{[A]}

(827138) 2000 LM_{6}	3 June 2000	list^{[A]}
(828071) 2003 QN_{116}	29 August 2003	list
(828353) 2003 YY_{176}	16 December 2003	list
(828425) 2004 HY_{76}	26 April 2004	list^{[C]}
(828629) 2004 XA_{187}	11 December 2004	list^{[C]}
(828630) 2004 XS_{187}	11 December 2004	list^{[C]}
(828631) 2004 XT_{187}	11 December 2004	list^{[C]}
(828632) 2004 XC_{188}	15 December 2004	list^{[C]}
(828634) 2004 XJ_{188}	15 December 2004	list^{[C]}
(828662) 2005 BC_{47}	16 January 2005	list^{[C]}
(828663) 2005 BD_{47}	16 January 2005	list^{[C]}
(828796) 2005 PH_{26}	5 August 2005	list^{[C]}
(828998) 2005 UZ_{524}	25 October 2005	list^{[C]}
(829387) 2006 QR_{90}	25 August 2006	list
(829864) 2007 LB_{31}	12 June 2007	list^{[B]}
(829877) 2007 OE_{9}	24 July 2007	list^{[B]}
(830042) 2007 TC_{166}	11 October 2007	list^{[B]}
(835694) 2011 TC_{17}	16 September 1993	list
(836106) 2012 DA_{42}	15 February 2001	list
(838698) 2014 MS_{23}	11 December 2004	list^{[C]}
(839116) 2014 PV_{15}	16 January 2005	list^{[C]}
(842872) 2016 AY_{89}	16 December 2003	list
(844674) 2017 DK_{94}	11 October 1996	list
(848112) 2003 QS_{115}	21 August 2003	list^{[B]}
(848113) 2003 QV_{116}	29 August 2003	list

(848114) 2003 QX_{116}	29 August 2003	list
(848447) 2003 YP_{176}	16 December 2003	list
(848498) 2004 FT_{16}	16 March 2004	list
(848791) 2004 XF_{189}	15 December 2004	list^{[C]}
(849552) 2006 AD_{103}	7 January 2006	list^{[C]}
(850447) 2007 BW_{30}	20 January 2007	list^{[B]}
(850595) 2007 FW_{34}	20 March 2007	list^{[B]}
(850630) 2007 GW_{71}	7 April 2007	list^{[B]}
(850728) 2007 PM_{41}	8 August 2007	list^{[B]}
(856622) 2011 UL_{351}	23 August 2006	list
(858396) 2012 WE_{10}	7 January 2006	list^{[C]}
(875482) 2004 FF_{17}	17 March 2004	list
(875645) 2005 OO_{29}	31 July 2005	list^{[C]}
(875646) 2005 OY_{29}	31 July 2005	list^{[C]}
(887365) 2004 XW_{188}	15 December 2004	list^{[C]}
Co-discovery made with:^{A} P. B. Stetson^{B} K. M. Perrett^{C} P. A. Wiegert^{D} C. Veillet^{E} G.C.L Aikman
