= List of minor planets: 827001–828000 =

The following is a partial list of minor planets, running from minor-planet number 827001 through 828000, inclusive. The primary data for this and other partial lists is based on JPL's "Small-Body Orbital Elements" and data available from the Minor Planet Center. Critical list information is also provided by the MPC, unless otherwise specified from Lowell Observatory. A detailed description of the table's columns and additional sources are given on the main page including a complete list of every page in this series, and a statistical break-up on the dynamical classification of minor planets.

Also see the summary list of all named bodies in numerical and alphabetical order, and the corresponding naming citations for the number range of this particular list. New namings may only be added to this list after official publication, as the preannouncement of names is condemned by the Working Group for Small Bodies Nomenclature of the International Astronomical Union.

Near-Earth obj.	MBA (inner)	MBA (outer)	Centaur
Mars-crosser	MBA (middle)	Jupiter trojan	Trans-Neptunian obj.
Unclassified

== 827001–827100 ==
Designation			Discovery			Properties		Ref
Permanent	Provisional	Named after	Date	Site	Discoverer(s)	Category	Diam.	Ref
827001	1999 FR_{76}	—	March 20, 1999	Sacramento Peak	SDSS	·	1.2 km	MPC · JPL
827002	1999 FK_{77}	—	March 20, 1999	Sacramento Peak	SDSS	EUP	2.5 km	MPC · JPL
827003	1999 FE_{78}	—	March 20, 1999	Sacramento Peak	SDSS	NYS	930 m	MPC · JPL
827004	1999 FU_{79}	—	March 20, 1999	Sacramento Peak	SDSS	GEF	880 m	MPC · JPL
827005	1999 FE_{80}	—	March 20, 1999	Sacramento Peak	SDSS	·	1.5 km	MPC · JPL
827006	1999 FL_{80}	—	March 21, 1999	Sacramento Peak	SDSS	·	1.1 km	MPC · JPL
827007	1999 FS_{80}	—	March 20, 1999	Sacramento Peak	SDSS	·	1.2 km	MPC · JPL
827008	1999 FO_{81}	—	March 20, 1999	Sacramento Peak	SDSS	·	1.4 km	MPC · JPL
827009	1999 FU_{81}	—	March 20, 1999	Sacramento Peak	SDSS	·	930 m	MPC · JPL
827010	1999 FG_{82}	—	March 20, 1999	Sacramento Peak	SDSS	PHO	820 m	MPC · JPL
827011	1999 FK_{82}	—	March 20, 1999	Sacramento Peak	SDSS	·	1.6 km	MPC · JPL
827012	1999 FK_{83}	—	March 6, 2003	Anderson Mesa	LONEOS	·	1.3 km	MPC · JPL
827013	1999 FL_{83}	—	March 20, 1999	Sacramento Peak	SDSS	·	2.9 km	MPC · JPL
827014	1999 FS_{83}	—	March 20, 1999	Sacramento Peak	SDSS	·	2.0 km	MPC · JPL
827015	1999 FA_{84}	—	March 21, 1999	Sacramento Peak	SDSS	·	1.1 km	MPC · JPL
827016	1999 FM_{84}	—	March 21, 1999	Sacramento Peak	SDSS	·	1.4 km	MPC · JPL
827017	1999 FE_{85}	—	March 21, 1999	Sacramento Peak	SDSS	·	2.8 km	MPC · JPL
827018	1999 FE_{86}	—	March 21, 1999	Sacramento Peak	SDSS	·	2.4 km	MPC · JPL
827019	1999 FM_{86}	—	March 21, 1999	Sacramento Peak	SDSS	·	820 m	MPC · JPL
827020	1999 FV_{86}	—	March 21, 1999	Sacramento Peak	SDSS	·	1.5 km	MPC · JPL
827021	1999 FA_{87}	—	March 21, 1999	Sacramento Peak	SDSS	NYS	1.2 km	MPC · JPL
827022	1999 FN_{88}	—	March 21, 1999	Sacramento Peak	SDSS	EOS	1.5 km	MPC · JPL
827023	1999 FL_{91}	—	March 21, 1999	Sacramento Peak	SDSS	·	920 m	MPC · JPL
827024	1999 FN_{91}	—	March 21, 1999	Sacramento Peak	SDSS	·	2.9 km	MPC · JPL
827025	1999 FR_{91}	—	March 21, 1999	Sacramento Peak	SDSS	·	2.5 km	MPC · JPL
827026	1999 FF_{92}	—	March 21, 1999	Sacramento Peak	SDSS	·	1.2 km	MPC · JPL
827027	1999 FJ_{92}	—	March 21, 1999	Sacramento Peak	SDSS	·	2.0 km	MPC · JPL
827028	1999 FM_{92}	—	March 21, 1999	Sacramento Peak	SDSS	·	2.7 km	MPC · JPL
827029	1999 FR_{92}	—	March 21, 1999	Sacramento Peak	SDSS	·	2.2 km	MPC · JPL
827030	1999 FV_{92}	—	March 21, 1999	Sacramento Peak	SDSS	·	3.3 km	MPC · JPL
827031	1999 FA_{93}	—	March 21, 1999	Sacramento Peak	SDSS	·	1.2 km	MPC · JPL
827032	1999 FO_{93}	—	March 21, 1999	Sacramento Peak	SDSS	·	2.7 km	MPC · JPL
827033	1999 FC_{94}	—	March 21, 1999	Sacramento Peak	SDSS	·	1.1 km	MPC · JPL
827034	1999 FX_{94}	—	March 21, 1999	Sacramento Peak	SDSS	·	1.8 km	MPC · JPL
827035	1999 FH_{95}	—	March 21, 1999	Sacramento Peak	SDSS	·	3.6 km	MPC · JPL
827036	1999 FJ_{95}	—	March 21, 1999	Sacramento Peak	SDSS	·	700 m	MPC · JPL
827037	1999 FS_{96}	—	March 21, 1999	Sacramento Peak	SDSS	EUN	980 m	MPC · JPL
827038	1999 FZ_{96}	—	March 24, 2003	Kitt Peak	Spacewatch	·	1.5 km	MPC · JPL
827039	1999 FG_{98}	—	January 21, 2012	Kitt Peak	Spacewatch	·	2.0 km	MPC · JPL
827040	1999 FC_{100}	—	May 20, 2010	WISE	WISE	·	570 m	MPC · JPL
827041	1999 FD_{100}	—	August 28, 2014	Haleakala	Pan-STARRS 1	PHO	680 m	MPC · JPL
827042	1999 FN_{100}	—	January 7, 2010	Kitt Peak	Spacewatch	PHO	1.1 km	MPC · JPL
827043	1999 FX_{100}	—	September 11, 2007	Mount Lemmon	Mount Lemmon Survey	(43176)	2.3 km	MPC · JPL
827044	1999 FE_{101}	—	April 9, 2016	Haleakala	Pan-STARRS 1	·	570 m	MPC · JPL
827045	1999 RT_{4}	—	August 21, 1999	Kitt Peak	Spacewatch	·	900 m	MPC · JPL
827046	1999 RF_{6}	—	September 3, 1999	Kitt Peak	Spacewatch	·	1.8 km	MPC · JPL
827047	1999 RV_{163}	—	September 14, 1999	Kitt Peak	Spacewatch	·	1 km	MPC · JPL
827048	1999 RC_{260}	—	September 23, 2008	Kitt Peak	Spacewatch	·	1.1 km	MPC · JPL
827049	1999 RG_{260}	—	September 9, 2016	Kitt Peak	Spacewatch	·	1.2 km	MPC · JPL
827050	1999 SF_{1}	—	September 18, 1999	Siding Spring	R. H. McNaught	·	940 m	MPC · JPL
827051	1999 SN_{29}	—	October 22, 2016	Kitt Peak	Spacewatch	·	530 m	MPC · JPL
827052	1999 TM_{67}	—	October 8, 1999	Kitt Peak	Spacewatch	JUN	690 m	MPC · JPL
827053	1999 TN_{68}	—	October 10, 2010	Kitt Peak	Spacewatch	EOS	1.3 km	MPC · JPL
827054	1999 TG_{84}	—	October 3, 1999	Kitt Peak	Spacewatch	·	1.3 km	MPC · JPL
827055	1999 TE_{176}	—	October 10, 1999	Socorro	LINEAR	NYS	640 m	MPC · JPL
827056	1999 TR_{327}	—	April 30, 2014	Haleakala	Pan-STARRS 1	·	770 m	MPC · JPL
827057	1999 TV_{328}	—	November 3, 2004	Kitt Peak	Spacewatch	·	1.4 km	MPC · JPL
827058	1999 TX_{328}	—	October 13, 1999	Sacramento Peak	SDSS	·	3.4 km	MPC · JPL
827059	1999 TA_{329}	—	October 13, 1999	Sacramento Peak	SDSS	·	830 m	MPC · JPL
827060	1999 TC_{329}	—	October 13, 1999	Sacramento Peak	SDSS	EMA	2.7 km	MPC · JPL
827061	1999 TF_{329}	—	October 13, 1999	Sacramento Peak	SDSS	EUN	900 m	MPC · JPL
827062	1999 TV_{329}	—	October 13, 1999	Sacramento Peak	SDSS	·	990 m	MPC · JPL
827063	1999 TE_{330}	—	October 13, 1999	Sacramento Peak	SDSS	VER	2.9 km	MPC · JPL
827064	1999 TG_{330}	—	October 13, 1999	Sacramento Peak	SDSS	·	1.0 km	MPC · JPL
827065	1999 TT_{330}	—	October 13, 1999	Sacramento Peak	SDSS	·	1.3 km	MPC · JPL
827066	1999 TW_{330}	—	October 13, 1999	Sacramento Peak	SDSS	·	2.0 km	MPC · JPL
827067	1999 TE_{331}	—	October 13, 1999	Sacramento Peak	SDSS	·	1.7 km	MPC · JPL
827068	1999 TG_{331}	—	October 13, 1999	Sacramento Peak	SDSS	·	1.2 km	MPC · JPL
827069	1999 TQ_{331}	—	October 13, 1999	Sacramento Peak	SDSS	·	1.2 km	MPC · JPL
827070	1999 TT_{331}	—	October 4, 1999	Kitt Peak	Spacewatch	V	410 m	MPC · JPL
827071	1999 TY_{331}	—	October 13, 1999	Sacramento Peak	SDSS	NEM	2.0 km	MPC · JPL
827072	1999 TJ_{332}	—	October 11, 1999	Kitt Peak	Spacewatch	·	1.1 km	MPC · JPL
827073	1999 TH_{333}	—	October 13, 1999	Sacramento Peak	SDSS	·	1.6 km	MPC · JPL
827074	1999 TM_{333}	—	October 13, 1999	Sacramento Peak	SDSS	·	2.7 km	MPC · JPL
827075	1999 TA_{334}	—	October 13, 1999	Sacramento Peak	SDSS	TIR	2.9 km	MPC · JPL
827076	1999 TP_{338}	—	October 9, 2008	Mount Lemmon	Mount Lemmon Survey	·	1.5 km	MPC · JPL
827077	1999 TZ_{339}	—	September 11, 2007	Mount Lemmon	Mount Lemmon Survey	·	590 m	MPC · JPL
827078	1999 TD_{341}	—	September 15, 2006	Kitt Peak	Spacewatch	·	650 m	MPC · JPL
827079	1999 TH_{341}	—	September 6, 2013	Mount Lemmon	Mount Lemmon Survey	·	1.7 km	MPC · JPL
827080	1999 TW_{341}	—	December 14, 2017	Haleakala	Pan-STARRS 1	·	1.4 km	MPC · JPL
827081	1999 TB_{342}	—	November 8, 2010	Mount Lemmon	Mount Lemmon Survey	·	1.8 km	MPC · JPL
827082	1999 TU_{342}	—	October 11, 1999	Kitt Peak	Spacewatch	·	1.7 km	MPC · JPL
827083	1999 UN_{39}	—	October 31, 1999	Kitt Peak	Spacewatch	·	730 m	MPC · JPL
827084	1999 UB_{66}	—	January 21, 2014	Mount Lemmon	Mount Lemmon Survey	·	1.4 km	MPC · JPL
827085	1999 UO_{66}	—	October 23, 2012	Kitt Peak	Spacewatch	·	980 m	MPC · JPL
827086	1999 UA_{67}	—	October 20, 1999	Kitt Peak	Spacewatch	·	1.1 km	MPC · JPL
827087	1999 VS_{115}	—	November 4, 1999	Kitt Peak	Spacewatch	·	750 m	MPC · JPL
827088	1999 VJ_{123}	—	November 5, 1999	Kitt Peak	Spacewatch	·	1.1 km	MPC · JPL
827089	1999 VR_{142}	—	November 11, 1999	Kitt Peak	Spacewatch	·	530 m	MPC · JPL
827090	1999 VS_{174}	—	October 18, 1999	Kitt Peak	Spacewatch	NYS	630 m	MPC · JPL
827091	1999 VR_{216}	—	November 1, 1999	Kitt Peak	Spacewatch	MAS	510 m	MPC · JPL
827092	1999 VF_{233}	—	November 9, 2008	Kitt Peak	Spacewatch	·	1.4 km	MPC · JPL
827093	1999 VS_{233}	—	August 12, 2013	Haleakala	Pan-STARRS 1	·	1.5 km	MPC · JPL
827094	1999 WX_{21}	—	November 17, 1999	Kitt Peak	Spacewatch	·	790 m	MPC · JPL
827095	1999 WS_{28}	—	October 2, 2016	Haleakala	Pan-STARRS 1	·	1.3 km	MPC · JPL
827096	1999 XM_{16}	—	December 5, 1999	Kitt Peak	Spacewatch	PHO	950 m	MPC · JPL
827097	1999 XF_{106}	—	December 11, 1999	Prescott	P. G. Comba	·	1.5 km	MPC · JPL
827098	1999 XT_{147}	—	December 7, 1999	Kitt Peak	Spacewatch	·	1.8 km	MPC · JPL
827099	1999 XA_{216}	—	December 13, 1999	Kitt Peak	Spacewatch	·	530 m	MPC · JPL
827100	1999 XT_{253}	—	December 12, 1999	Kitt Peak	Spacewatch	·	1.1 km	MPC · JPL

== 827101–827200 ==
back to top

Designation			Discovery			Properties		Ref
Permanent	Provisional	Named after	Date	Site	Discoverer(s)	Category	Diam.	Ref
827101	2000 AB_{259}	—	February 3, 2009	Mount Lemmon	Mount Lemmon Survey	·	1.2 km	MPC · JPL
827102	2000 BF_{37}	—	January 26, 2000	Kitt Peak	Spacewatch	·	1.4 km	MPC · JPL
827103	2000 CR_{101}	—	February 11, 2000	Kitt Peak	Spacewatch	AMO	310 m	MPC · JPL
827104	2000 CP_{142}	—	February 4, 2000	Kitt Peak	Spacewatch	·	1.2 km	MPC · JPL
827105	2000 CL_{154}	—	October 15, 2012	Mount Lemmon	Mount Lemmon Survey	·	650 m	MPC · JPL
827106	2000 CY_{154}	—	January 1, 2009	Kitt Peak	Spacewatch	·	1.4 km	MPC · JPL
827107	2000 CA_{155}	—	January 15, 2018	Haleakala	Pan-STARRS 1	·	870 m	MPC · JPL
827108	2000 CC_{156}	—	November 13, 2010	Kitt Peak	Spacewatch	NYS	840 m	MPC · JPL
827109	2000 DQ_{17}	—	February 4, 2000	Socorro	LINEAR	PHO	920 m	MPC · JPL
827110	2000 DJ_{39}	—	February 11, 2000	Kitt Peak	Spacewatch	·	2.7 km	MPC · JPL
827111	2000 EZ_{22}	—	March 3, 2000	Kitt Peak	Spacewatch	·	530 m	MPC · JPL
827112	2000 EK_{71}	—	March 9, 2000	Kitt Peak	Spacewatch	PHO	740 m	MPC · JPL
827113	2000 EG_{104}	—	March 11, 2000	Catalina	CSS	·	1.9 km	MPC · JPL
827114	2000 EN_{209}	—	March 3, 2000	Sacramento Peak	SDSS	·	1 km	MPC · JPL
827115	2000 EF_{210}	—	February 22, 2007	Kitt Peak	Spacewatch	NYS	560 m	MPC · JPL
827116	2000 EO_{212}	—	March 4, 2000	Sacramento Peak	SDSS	·	960 m	MPC · JPL
827117	2000 FM_{74}	—	October 15, 2009	Mount Lemmon	Mount Lemmon Survey	·	2.3 km	MPC · JPL
827118	2000 GT_{188}	—	October 15, 2015	Haleakala	Pan-STARRS 1	T_{j} (2.99) · EUP	2.4 km	MPC · JPL
827119	2000 GB_{189}	—	April 12, 2010	WISE	WISE	·	2.5 km	MPC · JPL
827120	2000 JO_{4}	—	May 1, 2000	Kitt Peak	Spacewatch	·	1.6 km	MPC · JPL
827121	2000 JZ_{8}	—	May 4, 2000	Socorro	LINEAR	AMO	180 m	MPC · JPL
827122	2000 JN_{85}	—	February 21, 2007	Kitt Peak	Spacewatch	MAS	500 m	MPC · JPL
827123	2000 JK_{91}	—	May 4, 2000	Sacramento Peak	SDSS	·	2.4 km	MPC · JPL
827124	2000 JM_{91}	—	May 4, 2000	Sacramento Peak	SDSS	ULA	3.8 km	MPC · JPL
827125	2000 JR_{91}	—	May 4, 2000	Sacramento Peak	SDSS	·	2.2 km	MPC · JPL
827126	2000 JT_{91}	—	May 4, 2000	Sacramento Peak	SDSS	·	2.2 km	MPC · JPL
827127	2000 JU_{91}	—	May 4, 2000	Sacramento Peak	SDSS	PHO	870 m	MPC · JPL
827128	2000 JV_{91}	—	May 4, 2000	Sacramento Peak	SDSS	·	1.0 km	MPC · JPL
827129	2000 JF_{92}	—	May 4, 2000	Sacramento Peak	SDSS	·	1.2 km	MPC · JPL
827130	2000 JQ_{92}	—	May 4, 2000	Sacramento Peak	SDSS	WAT	1.5 km	MPC · JPL
827131	2000 JK_{93}	—	May 5, 2000	Sacramento Peak	SDSS	·	800 m	MPC · JPL
827132	2000 JB_{96}	—	April 24, 2014	Mount Lemmon	Mount Lemmon Survey	DOR	1.6 km	MPC · JPL
827133	2000 JM_{96}	—	October 25, 2011	Haleakala	Pan-STARRS 1	·	1.6 km	MPC · JPL
827134	2000 JW_{97}	—	May 23, 2006	Mount Lemmon	Mount Lemmon Survey	·	3.0 km	MPC · JPL
827135	2000 JB_{98}	—	October 26, 2008	Mount Lemmon	Mount Lemmon Survey	·	2.0 km	MPC · JPL
827136	2000 KX_{83}	—	May 24, 2000	Mauna Kea	C. Veillet, D. D. Balam	·	760 m	MPC · JPL
827137	2000 LH_{2}	—	June 3, 2000	Mauna Kea	P. B. Stetson, D. D. Balam	·	1.5 km	MPC · JPL
827138	2000 LM_{6}	—	June 3, 2000	Mauna Kea	P. B. Stetson, D. D. Balam	·	1.7 km	MPC · JPL
827139	2000 OM_{70}	—	August 20, 2000	Kitt Peak	Spacewatch	·	740 m	MPC · JPL
827140	2000 OB_{72}	—	December 17, 2009	Mount Lemmon	Mount Lemmon Survey	·	800 m	MPC · JPL
827141	2000 OD_{72}	—	February 9, 2014	Kitt Peak	Spacewatch	·	1.5 km	MPC · JPL
827142	2000 OU_{72}	—	September 24, 2011	Mount Lemmon	Mount Lemmon Survey	·	600 m	MPC · JPL
827143	2000 OB_{73}	—	January 26, 2010	WISE	WISE	·	940 m	MPC · JPL
827144	2000 OF_{73}	—	September 17, 2012	Mount Lemmon	Mount Lemmon Survey	·	1.8 km	MPC · JPL
827145	2000 OU_{73}	—	July 29, 2000	Cerro Tololo	Deep Ecliptic Survey	·	1.6 km	MPC · JPL
827146	2000 PP_{9}	—	June 8, 2000	Socorro	LINEAR	AMO · PHA	480 m	MPC · JPL
827147	2000 PK_{34}	—	August 1, 2000	Cerro Tololo	Deep Ecliptic Survey	·	1.1 km	MPC · JPL
827148	2000 QT_{94}	—	August 26, 2000	Socorro	LINEAR	·	570 m	MPC · JPL
827149	2000 QS_{130}	—	August 31, 2000	Prescott	P. G. Comba	·	1.4 km	MPC · JPL
827150	2000 QP_{256}	—	April 12, 2015	Haleakala	Pan-STARRS 1	·	1.1 km	MPC · JPL
827151	2000 QX_{257}	—	March 10, 2016	Haleakala	Pan-STARRS 1	·	520 m	MPC · JPL
827152	2000 QT_{259}	—	October 13, 2010	Mount Lemmon	Mount Lemmon Survey	·	1.2 km	MPC · JPL
827153	2000 QE_{261}	—	February 21, 2017	Haleakala	Pan-STARRS 1	·	860 m	MPC · JPL
827154	2000 RP_{52}	—	September 1, 2000	Socorro	LINEAR	·	1.5 km	MPC · JPL
827155	2000 RU_{56}	—	September 7, 2000	Kitt Peak	Spacewatch	TIN	900 m	MPC · JPL
827156	2000 RQ_{106}	—	September 3, 2000	Sacramento Peak	SDSS	·	1.5 km	MPC · JPL
827157	2000 RX_{106}	—	September 3, 2000	Sacramento Peak	SDSS	·	940 m	MPC · JPL
827158	2000 RY_{106}	—	September 3, 2000	Sacramento Peak	SDSS	·	3.1 km	MPC · JPL
827159	2000 RK_{107}	—	September 3, 2000	Sacramento Peak	SDSS	·	1.6 km	MPC · JPL
827160	2000 RV_{109}	—	March 6, 2016	Haleakala	Pan-STARRS 1	·	2.2 km	MPC · JPL
827161	2000 RJ_{110}	—	September 7, 2000	Kitt Peak	Spacewatch	·	900 m	MPC · JPL
827162	2000 RN_{110}	—	June 19, 2015	Mount Lemmon	Mount Lemmon Survey	·	1 km	MPC · JPL
827163	2000 RK_{111}	—	November 10, 2010	Kitt Peak	Spacewatch	·	1.5 km	MPC · JPL
827164	2000 RS_{111}	—	September 3, 2000	Sacramento Peak	SDSS	·	740 m	MPC · JPL
827165	2000 RJ_{112}	—	March 17, 2015	Mount Lemmon	Mount Lemmon Survey	·	2.2 km	MPC · JPL
827166	2000 RM_{112}	—	January 20, 2015	Haleakala	Pan-STARRS 1	·	510 m	MPC · JPL
827167	2000 RN_{112}	—	July 28, 2011	Haleakala	Pan-STARRS 1	·	1.7 km	MPC · JPL
827168	2000 RK_{113}	—	September 7, 2000	Kitt Peak	Spacewatch	·	520 m	MPC · JPL
827169	2000 SD_{11}	—	September 2, 2000	Anderson Mesa	LONEOS	·	1.5 km	MPC · JPL
827170	2000 SZ_{57}	—	September 24, 2000	Socorro	LINEAR	·	730 m	MPC · JPL
827171	2000 SG_{96}	—	September 23, 2000	Socorro	LINEAR	(1547)	1.2 km	MPC · JPL
827172	2000 ST_{134}	—	September 23, 2000	Socorro	LINEAR	·	1.2 km	MPC · JPL
827173	2000 SS_{246}	—	September 24, 2000	Socorro	LINEAR	·	1.0 km	MPC · JPL
827174	2000 SB_{332}	—	September 23, 2000	Mauna Kea	B. J. Gladman, J. J. Kavelaars	THM	2.7 km	MPC · JPL
827175	2000 SE_{332}	—	September 23, 2000	Mauna Kea	B. J. Gladman, J. J. Kavelaars	·	2.2 km	MPC · JPL
827176	2000 SP_{332}	—	September 23, 2000	Mauna Kea	B. J. Gladman, J. J. Kavelaars	·	1.8 km	MPC · JPL
827177	2000 SD_{371}	—	September 23, 2000	Mauna Kea	Gladman, B. J.	·	1.5 km	MPC · JPL
827178	2000 SV_{372}	—	September 26, 2000	Sacramento Peak	SDSS	L5	7.6 km	MPC · JPL
827179	2000 SW_{372}	—	September 26, 2000	Sacramento Peak	SDSS	·	2.0 km	MPC · JPL
827180	2000 SH_{373}	—	September 26, 2000	Sacramento Peak	SDSS	LIX	2.8 km	MPC · JPL
827181	2000 SK_{373}	—	September 26, 2000	Sacramento Peak	SDSS	·	2.2 km	MPC · JPL
827182	2000 SN_{373}	—	September 26, 2000	Sacramento Peak	SDSS	·	1.3 km	MPC · JPL
827183	2000 SS_{373}	—	September 26, 2000	Sacramento Peak	SDSS	·	2.2 km	MPC · JPL
827184	2000 ST_{373}	—	September 26, 2000	Sacramento Peak	SDSS	·	2.6 km	MPC · JPL
827185	2000 SG_{374}	—	September 26, 2000	Sacramento Peak	SDSS	·	2.1 km	MPC · JPL
827186	2000 SP_{374}	—	September 26, 2000	Sacramento Peak	SDSS	·	1.6 km	MPC · JPL
827187	2000 SX_{374}	—	September 26, 2000	Sacramento Peak	SDSS	·	2.4 km	MPC · JPL
827188	2000 SH_{375}	—	September 26, 2000	Sacramento Peak	SDSS	EOS	1.6 km	MPC · JPL
827189	2000 SB_{376}	—	September 26, 2000	Sacramento Peak	SDSS	MAR	870 m	MPC · JPL
827190	2000 SP_{377}	—	November 28, 2013	Mount Lemmon	Mount Lemmon Survey	·	1.4 km	MPC · JPL
827191	2000 SD_{378}	—	September 27, 2000	Kitt Peak	Spacewatch	MAR	960 m	MPC · JPL
827192	2000 SG_{380}	—	December 10, 2013	Mount Lemmon	Mount Lemmon Survey	(5)	940 m	MPC · JPL
827193	2000 SY_{380}	—	September 8, 2007	Mount Lemmon	Mount Lemmon Survey	·	460 m	MPC · JPL
827194	2000 SE_{381}	—	October 2, 2014	Catalina	CSS	·	2.5 km	MPC · JPL
827195	2000 SR_{381}	—	July 30, 2010	WISE	WISE	·	2.2 km	MPC · JPL
827196	2000 SL_{382}	—	May 21, 2014	Kitt Peak	Spacewatch	·	690 m	MPC · JPL
827197	2000 SR_{382}	—	May 3, 2008	Kitt Peak	Spacewatch	·	1.4 km	MPC · JPL
827198	2000 SY_{382}	—	May 7, 2014	Haleakala	Pan-STARRS 1	·	1.1 km	MPC · JPL
827199	2000 SG_{383}	—	November 3, 2016	Haleakala	Pan-STARRS 1	·	710 m	MPC · JPL
827200	2000 SR_{383}	—	August 31, 2014	Haleakala	Pan-STARRS 1	·	1.4 km	MPC · JPL

== 827201–827300 ==
back to top

Designation			Discovery			Properties		Ref
Permanent	Provisional	Named after	Date	Site	Discoverer(s)	Category	Diam.	Ref
827201	2000 SL_{385}	—	May 12, 2010	WISE	WISE	·	990 m	MPC · JPL
827202	2000 ST_{385}	—	August 3, 2004	Siding Spring	SSS	·	980 m	MPC · JPL
827203	2000 SF_{386}	—	March 17, 2013	Palomar	Palomar Transient Factory	PHO	590 m	MPC · JPL
827204	2000 TE	—	October 1, 2000	Prescott	P. G. Comba	·	650 m	MPC · JPL
827205	2000 TB_{23}	—	September 21, 2000	Kitt Peak	Spacewatch	·	880 m	MPC · JPL
827206	2000 TC_{31}	—	October 4, 2000	Kitt Peak	Spacewatch	·	780 m	MPC · JPL
827207	2000 TQ_{72}	—	October 1, 2000	Sacramento Peak	SDSS	·	2.0 km	MPC · JPL
827208	2000 TR_{72}	—	October 1, 2000	Sacramento Peak	SDSS	·	730 m	MPC · JPL
827209	2000 TA_{73}	—	October 1, 2000	Sacramento Peak	SDSS	·	2.3 km	MPC · JPL
827210	2000 TJ_{73}	—	October 1, 2000	Sacramento Peak	SDSS	·	1.7 km	MPC · JPL
827211	2000 TL_{73}	—	October 1, 2000	Sacramento Peak	SDSS	·	1.7 km	MPC · JPL
827212	2000 TS_{73}	—	October 1, 2000	Sacramento Peak	SDSS	·	2.4 km	MPC · JPL
827213	2000 TG_{78}	—	November 27, 2013	Haleakala	Pan-STARRS 1	·	1.0 km	MPC · JPL
827214	2000 TL_{80}	—	April 10, 2014	Haleakala	Pan-STARRS 1	·	2.2 km	MPC · JPL
827215	2000 UD	—	October 1, 2000	Socorro	LINEAR	H	420 m	MPC · JPL
827216	2000 US_{16}	—	October 2, 2000	Anderson Mesa	LONEOS	·	880 m	MPC · JPL
827217	2000 UY_{40}	—	October 24, 2000	Socorro	LINEAR	·	1.6 km	MPC · JPL
827218	2000 UC_{115}	—	October 21, 2000	Kitt Peak	Spacewatch	·	1.3 km	MPC · JPL
827219	2000 VW	—	November 2, 2000	Kitt Peak	Spacewatch	·	1.2 km	MPC · JPL
827220	2000 VC_{1}	—	March 23, 2021	Kitt Peak	Bok NEO Survey	·	1.1 km	MPC · JPL
827221	2000 VD_{66}	—	December 28, 2011	Kitt Peak	Spacewatch	·	550 m	MPC · JPL
827222	2000 VF_{66}	—	November 2, 2000	Kitt Peak	Spacewatch	·	1.0 km	MPC · JPL
827223	2000 WZ	—	November 17, 2000	Kitt Peak	Spacewatch	·	3.6 km	MPC · JPL
827224	2000 WU_{19}	—	October 29, 2000	Kitt Peak	Spacewatch	·	830 m	MPC · JPL
827225	2000 WQ_{20}	—	November 25, 2000	Kitt Peak	Spacewatch	·	700 m	MPC · JPL
827226	2000 WU_{50}	—	November 23, 2000	Bohyunsan	Jeon, Y.-B., Park, Y.-H.	·	510 m	MPC · JPL
827227	2000 WB_{105}	—	September 21, 2000	Kitt Peak	Spacewatch	·	480 m	MPC · JPL
827228	2000 WO_{139}	—	November 21, 2000	Socorro	LINEAR	·	1.2 km	MPC · JPL
827229	2000 WR_{165}	—	November 26, 2000	Kitt Peak	Spacewatch	·	1.2 km	MPC · JPL
827230	2000 WP_{193}	—	November 24, 2000	Kitt Peak	Deep Lens Survey	·	840 m	MPC · JPL
827231	2000 WA_{202}	—	November 30, 2000	Sacramento Peak	SDSS	JUN	770 m	MPC · JPL
827232	2000 WC_{202}	—	July 6, 2016	Mount Lemmon	Mount Lemmon Survey	·	2.1 km	MPC · JPL
827233	2000 WE_{203}	—	April 22, 2012	Catalina	CSS	PHO	570 m	MPC · JPL
827234	2000 WP_{203}	—	November 9, 2013	Kitt Peak	Spacewatch	·	1.1 km	MPC · JPL
827235	2000 WV_{204}	—	August 29, 2005	Kitt Peak	Spacewatch	·	1.5 km	MPC · JPL
827236	2000 XZ_{44}	—	December 8, 2000	Socorro	LINEAR	·	1.3 km	MPC · JPL
827237	2000 YT_{37}	—	December 19, 2000	Kitt Peak	Spacewatch	·	1.4 km	MPC · JPL
827238	2000 YN_{133}	—	September 29, 2008	Catalina	CSS	·	1.0 km	MPC · JPL
827239	2000 YL_{141}	—	December 20, 2000	Kitt Peak	Deep Lens Survey	·	2.3 km	MPC · JPL
827240	2000 YM_{145}	—	December 18, 2014	Haleakala	Pan-STARRS 1	PHO	810 m	MPC · JPL
827241	2001 BT_{84}	—	November 3, 2007	Mount Lemmon	Mount Lemmon Survey	·	1.1 km	MPC · JPL
827242	2001 DL_{95}	—	January 4, 2001	Haleakala	NEAT	H	500 m	MPC · JPL
827243	2001 DX_{109}	—	February 21, 2001	Sacramento Peak	SDSS	H	560 m	MPC · JPL
827244	2001 DY_{109}	—	February 21, 2001	Sacramento Peak	SDSS	TIR	2.3 km	MPC · JPL
827245	2001 DY_{110}	—	June 9, 2010	WISE	WISE	·	4.7 km	MPC · JPL
827246	2001 DK_{114}	—	February 16, 2001	Kitt Peak	Spacewatch	·	730 m	MPC · JPL
827247	2001 DG_{116}	—	July 21, 2010	WISE	WISE	·	2.3 km	MPC · JPL
827248	2001 DX_{117}	—	November 4, 2013	Haleakala	Pan-STARRS 1	·	1.6 km	MPC · JPL
827249	2001 DH_{118}	—	January 25, 2011	Kitt Peak	Spacewatch	·	560 m	MPC · JPL
827250	2001 DF_{119}	—	April 18, 2015	Haleakala	Pan-STARRS 1	·	3.1 km	MPC · JPL
827251	2001 DC_{120}	—	February 25, 2014	Kitt Peak	Spacewatch	·	1.1 km	MPC · JPL
827252	2001 FW_{32}	—	March 23, 2001	Prescott	P. G. Comba	EUN	1.2 km	MPC · JPL
827253	2001 FU_{198}	—	September 30, 2005	Mauna Kea	A. Boattini	THM	1.5 km	MPC · JPL
827254	2001 FO_{201}	—	March 21, 2001	Kitt Peak	SKADS	V	350 m	MPC · JPL
827255	2001 FH_{204}	—	March 21, 2001	Kitt Peak	SKADS	AGN	770 m	MPC · JPL
827256	2001 FC_{205}	—	March 21, 2001	Kitt Peak	SKADS	·	1.1 km	MPC · JPL
827257	2001 FE_{206}	—	March 21, 2001	Kitt Peak	SKADS	·	500 m	MPC · JPL
827258	2001 FT_{206}	—	March 26, 2001	Kitt Peak	Deep Ecliptic Survey	HOF	1.7 km	MPC · JPL
827259	2001 FQ_{213}	—	September 22, 2009	Mount Lemmon	Mount Lemmon Survey	·	1.6 km	MPC · JPL
827260	2001 FX_{213}	—	March 22, 2001	Kitt Peak	Spacewatch	·	1.9 km	MPC · JPL
827261	2001 FQ_{217}	—	March 21, 2001	Kitt Peak	SKADS	·	1.1 km	MPC · JPL
827262	2001 FO_{218}	—	March 21, 2001	Kitt Peak	SKADS	MAS	470 m	MPC · JPL
827263	2001 FA_{222}	—	September 28, 2003	Kitt Peak	Spacewatch	AGN	740 m	MPC · JPL
827264	2001 FC_{240}	—	March 29, 2001	Kitt Peak	SKADS	·	1.7 km	MPC · JPL
827265	2001 FK_{245}	—	May 7, 2014	Haleakala	Pan-STARRS 1	·	930 m	MPC · JPL
827266	2001 FB_{246}	—	March 19, 2001	Sacramento Peak	SDSS	PHO	560 m	MPC · JPL
827267	2001 FB_{248}	—	March 19, 2001	Sacramento Peak	SDSS	·	1.1 km	MPC · JPL
827268	2001 FD_{249}	—	March 19, 2001	Sacramento Peak	SDSS	EUN	780 m	MPC · JPL
827269	2001 GY_{11}	—	March 22, 2009	Mount Lemmon	Mount Lemmon Survey	H	340 m	MPC · JPL
827270	2001 HN_{67}	—	April 28, 2001	Kitt Peak	Spacewatch	·	1.1 km	MPC · JPL
827271	2001 HM_{69}	—	February 16, 2004	Kitt Peak	Spacewatch	·	540 m	MPC · JPL
827272	2001 HQ_{69}	—	April 10, 2013	Mount Lemmon	Mount Lemmon Survey	·	1.3 km	MPC · JPL
827273	2001 HT_{70}	—	April 25, 2015	Haleakala	Pan-STARRS 1	·	480 m	MPC · JPL
827274	2001 KC_{81}	—	March 29, 2015	Haleakala	Pan-STARRS 1	·	470 m	MPC · JPL
827275	2001 KJ_{81}	—	January 20, 2015	Haleakala	Pan-STARRS 1	MAS	500 m	MPC · JPL
827276	2001 KP_{81}	—	May 23, 2001	Cerro Tololo	Deep Ecliptic Survey	·	550 m	MPC · JPL
827277	2001 KV_{82}	—	January 27, 2011	Mount Lemmon	Mount Lemmon Survey	·	610 m	MPC · JPL
827278	2001 KX_{84}	—	October 8, 2007	Mount Lemmon	Mount Lemmon Survey	·	1.3 km	MPC · JPL
827279	2001 KU_{85}	—	May 23, 2001	Sacramento Peak	SDSS	(895)	2.5 km	MPC · JPL
827280	2001 KD_{86}	—	November 19, 2015	Kitt Peak	Spacewatch	·	680 m	MPC · JPL
827281	2001 KP_{87}	—	February 27, 2012	Haleakala	Pan-STARRS 1	·	2.1 km	MPC · JPL
827282	2001 KQ_{89}	—	May 20, 2001	Cerro Tololo	Deep Ecliptic Survey	·	1.8 km	MPC · JPL
827283	2001 LO	—	May 11, 2001	Palomar	NEAT	·	630 m	MPC · JPL
827284	2001 LU_{5}	—	June 15, 2001	Palomar	NEAT	·	1.0 km	MPC · JPL
827285	2001 MD_{32}	—	July 26, 2010	WISE	WISE	T_{j} (2.99) · 3:2 · SHU	4.4 km	MPC · JPL
827286	2001 ND_{1}	—	June 21, 2001	Palomar	NEAT	·	1.2 km	MPC · JPL
827287	2001 OD_{91}	—	July 18, 2001	Badlands	Dyvig, R.	·	1.6 km	MPC · JPL
827288	2001 OJ_{115}	—	January 21, 2015	Haleakala	Pan-STARRS 1	·	930 m	MPC · JPL
827289	2001 ON_{115}	—	July 22, 2001	Palomar	NEAT	·	1.5 km	MPC · JPL
827290	2001 PA_{4}	—	August 10, 2001	Palomar	NEAT	·	730 m	MPC · JPL
827291	2001 PH_{29}	—	August 15, 2001	Haleakala	NEAT	·	660 m	MPC · JPL
827292	2001 QN_{50}	—	August 12, 2001	Haleakala	NEAT	·	1.6 km	MPC · JPL
827293	2001 QQ_{106}	—	August 17, 2001	Socorro	LINEAR	BAR	1.1 km	MPC · JPL
827294	2001 QW_{116}	—	August 17, 2001	Socorro	LINEAR	·	1.3 km	MPC · JPL
827295	2001 QJ_{153}	—	August 23, 2001	Palomar	NEAT	·	2.3 km	MPC · JPL
827296	2001 QQ_{154}	—	August 23, 2001	Socorro	LINEAR	·	1.8 km	MPC · JPL
827297	2001 QT_{164}	—	July 20, 2001	Palomar	NEAT	·	560 m	MPC · JPL
827298	2001 QK_{187}	—	August 21, 2001	Haleakala	NEAT	·	2.7 km	MPC · JPL
827299	2001 QD_{215}	—	August 23, 2001	Anderson Mesa	LONEOS	·	1.4 km	MPC · JPL
827300	2001 QY_{226}	—	August 17, 2001	Socorro	LINEAR	H	520 m	MPC · JPL

== 827301–827400 ==
back to top

Designation			Discovery			Properties		Ref
Permanent	Provisional	Named after	Date	Site	Discoverer(s)	Category	Diam.	Ref
827301	2001 QC_{265}	—	August 16, 2001	Socorro	LINEAR	·	2.8 km	MPC · JPL
827302	2001 QD_{302}	—	August 19, 2001	Cerro Tololo	Deep Ecliptic Survey	·	1.4 km	MPC · JPL
827303	2001 QS_{311}	—	August 20, 2001	Cerro Tololo	Deep Ecliptic Survey	THB	2.7 km	MPC · JPL
827304	2001 QG_{321}	—	August 20, 2001	Cerro Tololo	Deep Ecliptic Survey	·	660 m	MPC · JPL
827305	2001 QZ_{328}	—	August 16, 2001	Socorro	LINEAR	·	920 m	MPC · JPL
827306	2001 QS_{337}	—	November 1, 2006	Mount Lemmon	Mount Lemmon Survey	AGN	820 m	MPC · JPL
827307	2001 QZ_{337}	—	October 16, 2012	Mount Lemmon	Mount Lemmon Survey	NYS	700 m	MPC · JPL
827308	2001 RB_{14}	—	September 10, 2001	Socorro	LINEAR	·	690 m	MPC · JPL
827309	2001 RY_{39}	—	August 12, 2001	Palomar	NEAT	EUN	1.2 km	MPC · JPL
827310	2001 SV_{26}	—	September 16, 2001	Socorro	LINEAR	·	500 m	MPC · JPL
827311	2001 SM_{27}	—	September 16, 2001	Socorro	LINEAR	·	1.7 km	MPC · JPL
827312	2001 SG_{29}	—	September 16, 2001	Socorro	LINEAR	·	1.5 km	MPC · JPL
827313	2001 SQ_{85}	—	September 24, 1960	Palomar Mountain	C. J. van Houten, I. van Houten-Groeneveld, T. Gehrels	·	1.4 km	MPC · JPL
827314	2001 SC_{102}	—	September 20, 2001	Socorro	LINEAR	·	540 m	MPC · JPL
827315	2001 SE_{144}	—	September 16, 2001	Socorro	LINEAR	·	530 m	MPC · JPL
827316	2001 SO_{195}	—	August 26, 2001	Kitt Peak	Spacewatch	·	1.3 km	MPC · JPL
827317	2001 SC_{201}	—	August 22, 2001	Kitt Peak	Spacewatch	·	1.3 km	MPC · JPL
827318	2001 SW_{221}	—	September 19, 2001	Socorro	LINEAR	·	960 m	MPC · JPL
827319	2001 SV_{238}	—	September 19, 2001	Socorro	LINEAR	3:2 · SHU	4.1 km	MPC · JPL
827320	2001 SU_{268}	—	September 19, 2001	Kitt Peak	Spacewatch	MAS	440 m	MPC · JPL
827321	2001 SA_{294}	—	September 19, 2001	Socorro	LINEAR	·	1.2 km	MPC · JPL
827322	2001 SP_{330}	—	September 19, 2001	Kitt Peak	Spacewatch	·	2.1 km	MPC · JPL
827323	2001 SO_{332}	—	September 19, 2001	Kitt Peak	Spacewatch	MRX	840 m	MPC · JPL
827324	2001 SP_{351}	—	September 18, 2001	Sacramento Peak	SDSS	MAR	760 m	MPC · JPL
827325	2001 SX_{351}	—	September 18, 2001	Sacramento Peak	SDSS	·	1.4 km	MPC · JPL
827326	2001 SZ_{351}	—	September 18, 2001	Sacramento Peak	SDSS	·	2.3 km	MPC · JPL
827327	2001 SW_{354}	—	September 18, 2001	Sacramento Peak	SDSS	·	2.0 km	MPC · JPL
827328	2001 SC_{359}	—	January 20, 2015	Haleakala	Pan-STARRS 1	·	2.4 km	MPC · JPL
827329	2001 SN_{359}	—	July 18, 2015	Haleakala	Pan-STARRS 1	BRA	1.2 km	MPC · JPL
827330	2001 SQ_{359}	—	August 30, 2005	Kitt Peak	Spacewatch	·	970 m	MPC · JPL
827331	2001 SR_{359}	—	October 20, 2016	Mount Lemmon	Mount Lemmon Survey	·	1.0 km	MPC · JPL
827332	2001 SS_{359}	—	March 5, 2008	Mount Lemmon	Mount Lemmon Survey	·	1.1 km	MPC · JPL
827333	2001 SZ_{363}	—	June 27, 2010	WISE	WISE	·	2.5 km	MPC · JPL
827334	2001 SK_{364}	—	September 21, 2001	Sacramento Peak	SDSS	EOS	1.6 km	MPC · JPL
827335	2001 SQ_{364}	—	September 20, 2001	Kitt Peak	Spacewatch	BRA	1.1 km	MPC · JPL
827336	2001 TR_{112}	—	September 25, 2001	Socorro	LINEAR	·	1.4 km	MPC · JPL
827337	2001 TB_{126}	—	October 10, 2001	Palomar	NEAT	·	1.4 km	MPC · JPL
827338	2001 TC_{131}	—	October 10, 2001	Palomar	NEAT	·	760 m	MPC · JPL
827339	2001 TG_{144}	—	September 16, 2001	Socorro	LINEAR	·	570 m	MPC · JPL
827340	2001 TJ_{173}	—	October 13, 2001	Socorro	LINEAR	·	1.6 km	MPC · JPL
827341	2001 TA_{180}	—	October 14, 2001	Socorro	LINEAR	·	500 m	MPC · JPL
827342	2001 TL_{181}	—	October 14, 2001	Socorro	LINEAR	PHO	690 m	MPC · JPL
827343	2001 TO_{186}	—	September 20, 2001	Socorro	LINEAR	·	530 m	MPC · JPL
827344	2001 TE_{199}	—	October 11, 2001	Socorro	LINEAR	·	1.1 km	MPC · JPL
827345	2001 TC_{243}	—	October 14, 2001	Sacramento Peak	SDSS	·	1.2 km	MPC · JPL
827346	2001 TP_{243}	—	October 14, 2001	Sacramento Peak	SDSS	·	2.2 km	MPC · JPL
827347	2001 TF_{244}	—	October 14, 2001	Sacramento Peak	SDSS	·	1.0 km	MPC · JPL
827348	2001 TG_{244}	—	October 14, 2001	Sacramento Peak	SDSS	·	1.6 km	MPC · JPL
827349	2001 TM_{244}	—	October 14, 2001	Sacramento Peak	SDSS	·	1.2 km	MPC · JPL
827350	2001 TF_{245}	—	October 14, 2001	Sacramento Peak	SDSS	·	740 m	MPC · JPL
827351	2001 TG_{245}	—	October 14, 2001	Sacramento Peak	SDSS	EOS	1.4 km	MPC · JPL
827352	2001 TS_{245}	—	October 14, 2001	Sacramento Peak	SDSS	·	2.1 km	MPC · JPL
827353	2001 TU_{245}	—	October 14, 2001	Sacramento Peak	SDSS	·	2.1 km	MPC · JPL
827354	2001 TX_{245}	—	October 14, 2001	Sacramento Peak	SDSS	·	1.6 km	MPC · JPL
827355	2001 TF_{246}	—	October 14, 2001	Sacramento Peak	SDSS	·	1.9 km	MPC · JPL
827356	2001 TJ_{246}	—	October 14, 2001	Sacramento Peak	SDSS	TIR	2.2 km	MPC · JPL
827357	2001 TY_{246}	—	October 14, 2001	Sacramento Peak	SDSS	·	1.7 km	MPC · JPL
827358	2001 TH_{247}	—	October 14, 2001	Sacramento Peak	SDSS	·	2.3 km	MPC · JPL
827359	2001 TV_{247}	—	October 14, 2001	Sacramento Peak	SDSS	·	1.5 km	MPC · JPL
827360	2001 TC_{248}	—	October 14, 2001	Sacramento Peak	SDSS	·	610 m	MPC · JPL
827361	2001 TP_{248}	—	October 14, 2001	Sacramento Peak	SDSS	·	1.2 km	MPC · JPL
827362	2001 TE_{249}	—	October 14, 2001	Sacramento Peak	SDSS	·	580 m	MPC · JPL
827363	2001 TH_{249}	—	October 14, 2001	Sacramento Peak	SDSS	·	2.1 km	MPC · JPL
827364	2001 TX_{249}	—	October 14, 2001	Sacramento Peak	SDSS	·	2.2 km	MPC · JPL
827365	2001 TE_{250}	—	October 14, 2001	Sacramento Peak	SDSS	·	1.6 km	MPC · JPL
827366	2001 TZ_{250}	—	October 14, 2001	Sacramento Peak	SDSS	KOR	930 m	MPC · JPL
827367	2001 TF_{251}	—	October 14, 2001	Sacramento Peak	SDSS	·	1.1 km	MPC · JPL
827368	2001 TG_{251}	—	October 14, 2001	Sacramento Peak	SDSS	·	1.5 km	MPC · JPL
827369	2001 TT_{251}	—	October 14, 2001	Sacramento Peak	SDSS	·	1.5 km	MPC · JPL
827370	2001 TA_{252}	—	October 10, 2001	Palomar	NEAT	EUN	1.2 km	MPC · JPL
827371	2001 TK_{252}	—	October 14, 2001	Sacramento Peak	SDSS	(18466)	1.5 km	MPC · JPL
827372	2001 TP_{252}	—	October 14, 2001	Sacramento Peak	SDSS	VER	2.2 km	MPC · JPL
827373	2001 TV_{252}	—	October 14, 2001	Sacramento Peak	SDSS	·	2.1 km	MPC · JPL
827374	2001 TZ_{252}	—	October 14, 2001	Sacramento Peak	SDSS	·	1.3 km	MPC · JPL
827375	2001 TE_{253}	—	October 16, 2001	Palomar	NEAT	·	1.3 km	MPC · JPL
827376	2001 TF_{253}	—	October 14, 2001	Sacramento Peak	SDSS	·	1.4 km	MPC · JPL
827377	2001 TG_{253}	—	October 14, 2001	Sacramento Peak	SDSS	·	1.3 km	MPC · JPL
827378	2001 TJ_{253}	—	October 14, 2001	Sacramento Peak	SDSS	EOS	2.1 km	MPC · JPL
827379	2001 TP_{253}	—	October 14, 2001	Sacramento Peak	SDSS	V	410 m	MPC · JPL
827380	2001 TR_{253}	—	October 14, 2001	Sacramento Peak	SDSS	HOF	2.1 km	MPC · JPL
827381	2001 TY_{253}	—	October 14, 2001	Sacramento Peak	SDSS	·	2.1 km	MPC · JPL
827382	2001 TZ_{253}	—	October 14, 2001	Sacramento Peak	SDSS	·	1.0 km	MPC · JPL
827383	2001 TA_{254}	—	October 14, 2001	Sacramento Peak	SDSS	·	1.7 km	MPC · JPL
827384	2001 TE_{254}	—	October 14, 2001	Sacramento Peak	SDSS	DOR	1.9 km	MPC · JPL
827385	2001 TH_{254}	—	October 14, 2001	Sacramento Peak	SDSS	·	1.6 km	MPC · JPL
827386	2001 TS_{254}	—	October 14, 2001	Sacramento Peak	SDSS	·	1.6 km	MPC · JPL
827387	2001 TV_{254}	—	October 14, 2001	Sacramento Peak	SDSS	3:2	5.0 km	MPC · JPL
827388	2001 TY_{254}	—	October 14, 2001	Sacramento Peak	SDSS	HYG	3.0 km	MPC · JPL
827389	2001 TM_{255}	—	October 14, 2001	Sacramento Peak	SDSS	·	1.4 km	MPC · JPL
827390	2001 TO_{255}	—	October 14, 2001	Sacramento Peak	SDSS	·	2.2 km	MPC · JPL
827391	2001 TQ_{255}	—	October 14, 2001	Sacramento Peak	SDSS	·	2.4 km	MPC · JPL
827392	2001 TK_{259}	—	December 10, 2001	Sacramento Peak	SDSS	·	550 m	MPC · JPL
827393	2001 TG_{263}	—	October 16, 2001	Cima Ekar	ADAS	·	1.3 km	MPC · JPL
827394	2001 TB_{265}	—	September 17, 2017	Haleakala	Pan-STARRS 1	·	1.8 km	MPC · JPL
827395	2001 TO_{265}	—	November 26, 2012	Mount Lemmon	Mount Lemmon Survey	·	1.3 km	MPC · JPL
827396	2001 TU_{265}	—	February 9, 2008	Mount Lemmon	Mount Lemmon Survey	·	1.2 km	MPC · JPL
827397	2001 TN_{266}	—	June 23, 2010	WISE	WISE	·	1.5 km	MPC · JPL
827398	2001 TC_{267}	—	October 6, 2012	Mount Lemmon	Mount Lemmon Survey	·	760 m	MPC · JPL
827399	2001 TY_{267}	—	September 9, 2007	Kitt Peak	Spacewatch	·	2.2 km	MPC · JPL
827400	2001 TH_{268}	—	November 12, 2001	Sacramento Peak	SDSS	·	1.5 km	MPC · JPL

== 827401–827500 ==
back to top

Designation			Discovery			Properties		Ref
Permanent	Provisional	Named after	Date	Site	Discoverer(s)	Category	Diam.	Ref
827401	2001 TO_{269}	—	October 14, 2001	Sacramento Peak	SDSS	·	1.3 km	MPC · JPL
827402	2001 TC_{270}	—	October 14, 2001	Sacramento Peak	SDSS	ELF	2.1 km	MPC · JPL
827403	2001 UO_{42}	—	October 7, 2001	Palomar	NEAT	·	930 m	MPC · JPL
827404	2001 UX_{93}	—	October 23, 2001	Palomar	NEAT	·	1.6 km	MPC · JPL
827405	2001 UJ_{104}	—	October 18, 2001	Palomar	NEAT	·	490 m	MPC · JPL
827406	2001 UF_{147}	—	October 23, 2001	Socorro	LINEAR	·	1.4 km	MPC · JPL
827407	2001 UG_{197}	—	August 29, 2001	Palomar	NEAT	·	820 m	MPC · JPL
827408	2001 UE_{207}	—	October 20, 2001	Socorro	LINEAR	·	1.1 km	MPC · JPL
827409	2001 UP_{231}	—	October 14, 2001	Sacramento Peak	SDSS	·	1.5 km	MPC · JPL
827410	2001 UE_{232}	—	October 22, 2012	Haleakala	Pan-STARRS 1	·	850 m	MPC · JPL
827411	2001 UF_{232}	—	October 21, 2001	Socorro	LINEAR	·	2.3 km	MPC · JPL
827412	2001 UD_{234}	—	November 13, 2010	Mount Lemmon	Mount Lemmon Survey	·	1.2 km	MPC · JPL
827413	2001 UX_{235}	—	May 25, 2010	WISE	WISE	·	2.4 km	MPC · JPL
827414	2001 UY_{235}	—	July 20, 2010	WISE	WISE	·	1.2 km	MPC · JPL
827415	2001 UJ_{236}	—	July 30, 2010	WISE	WISE	·	1.6 km	MPC · JPL
827416	2001 UW_{237}	—	March 18, 2018	Haleakala	Pan-STARRS 1	·	1.4 km	MPC · JPL
827417	2001 UB_{238}	—	November 2, 2010	Mount Lemmon	Mount Lemmon Survey	·	1.3 km	MPC · JPL
827418	2001 UZ_{240}	—	October 25, 2001	Sacramento Peak	SDSS	·	1.3 km	MPC · JPL
827419	2001 VM_{57}	—	October 18, 2001	Kitt Peak	Spacewatch	·	520 m	MPC · JPL
827420	2001 VV_{126}	—	November 11, 2001	Sacramento Peak	SDSS	·	1.5 km	MPC · JPL
827421	2001 VY_{126}	—	November 11, 2001	Sacramento Peak	SDSS	DOR	1.7 km	MPC · JPL
827422	2001 VC_{127}	—	November 11, 2001	Sacramento Peak	SDSS	·	1.4 km	MPC · JPL
827423	2001 VD_{127}	—	November 11, 2001	Sacramento Peak	SDSS	·	1.1 km	MPC · JPL
827424	2001 VE_{127}	—	November 11, 2001	Sacramento Peak	SDSS	·	1.0 km	MPC · JPL
827425	2001 VK_{127}	—	November 11, 2001	Sacramento Peak	SDSS	·	1.4 km	MPC · JPL
827426	2001 VL_{127}	—	November 11, 2001	Sacramento Peak	SDSS	·	910 m	MPC · JPL
827427	2001 VV_{127}	—	November 11, 2001	Sacramento Peak	SDSS	·	1.7 km	MPC · JPL
827428	2001 VW_{127}	—	November 11, 2001	Sacramento Peak	SDSS	·	2.5 km	MPC · JPL
827429	2001 VZ_{127}	—	November 11, 2001	Sacramento Peak	SDSS	·	2.0 km	MPC · JPL
827430	2001 VE_{128}	—	November 11, 2001	Sacramento Peak	SDSS	·	870 m	MPC · JPL
827431	2001 VO_{128}	—	November 11, 2001	Sacramento Peak	SDSS	L5	6.7 km	MPC · JPL
827432	2001 VB_{129}	—	November 11, 2001	Sacramento Peak	SDSS	·	940 m	MPC · JPL
827433	2001 VC_{129}	—	November 11, 2001	Sacramento Peak	SDSS	L5	9.1 km	MPC · JPL
827434	2001 VF_{129}	—	November 11, 2001	Sacramento Peak	SDSS	·	2.9 km	MPC · JPL
827435	2001 VJ_{129}	—	November 11, 2001	Sacramento Peak	SDSS	EUN	790 m	MPC · JPL
827436	2001 VN_{129}	—	November 12, 2001	Sacramento Peak	SDSS	·	2.0 km	MPC · JPL
827437	2001 VO_{129}	—	November 11, 2001	Sacramento Peak	SDSS	ELF	3.0 km	MPC · JPL
827438	2001 VP_{129}	—	November 11, 2001	Sacramento Peak	SDSS	T_{j} (2.99)	2.4 km	MPC · JPL
827439	2001 VB_{130}	—	November 11, 2001	Sacramento Peak	SDSS	·	2.1 km	MPC · JPL
827440	2001 VC_{130}	—	November 11, 2001	Sacramento Peak	SDSS	·	3.7 km	MPC · JPL
827441	2001 VD_{130}	—	November 11, 2001	Sacramento Peak	SDSS	EOS	1.5 km	MPC · JPL
827442	2001 VJ_{130}	—	November 11, 2001	Sacramento Peak	SDSS	·	3.0 km	MPC · JPL
827443	2001 VR_{130}	—	November 11, 2001	Sacramento Peak	SDSS	·	1.2 km	MPC · JPL
827444	2001 VS_{130}	—	November 11, 2001	Sacramento Peak	SDSS	LIX	2.6 km	MPC · JPL
827445	2001 VX_{130}	—	November 11, 2001	Sacramento Peak	SDSS	·	2.6 km	MPC · JPL
827446	2001 VZ_{130}	—	November 11, 2001	Sacramento Peak	SDSS	·	1.5 km	MPC · JPL
827447	2001 VB_{131}	—	November 11, 2001	Sacramento Peak	SDSS	·	2.9 km	MPC · JPL
827448	2001 VL_{131}	—	November 11, 2001	Sacramento Peak	SDSS	·	1.5 km	MPC · JPL
827449	2001 VT_{131}	—	November 11, 2001	Sacramento Peak	SDSS	·	1.7 km	MPC · JPL
827450	2001 VV_{131}	—	November 11, 2001	Sacramento Peak	SDSS	·	1.2 km	MPC · JPL
827451	2001 VE_{132}	—	November 11, 2001	Sacramento Peak	SDSS	·	2.5 km	MPC · JPL
827452	2001 VK_{132}	—	November 12, 2001	Sacramento Peak	SDSS	L5	10 km	MPC · JPL
827453	2001 VS_{132}	—	November 12, 2001	Sacramento Peak	SDSS	·	1.1 km	MPC · JPL
827454	2001 VA_{136}	—	November 11, 2001	Sacramento Peak	SDSS	·	1.6 km	MPC · JPL
827455	2001 VO_{136}	—	November 12, 2001	Sacramento Peak	SDSS	·	2.5 km	MPC · JPL
827456	2001 VQ_{137}	—	January 11, 2015	Haleakala	Pan-STARRS 1	·	1.3 km	MPC · JPL
827457	2001 VU_{137}	—	October 2, 2008	Kitt Peak	Spacewatch	·	630 m	MPC · JPL
827458	2001 VH_{138}	—	October 18, 2018	Mount Lemmon	Mount Lemmon Survey	·	1.0 km	MPC · JPL
827459	2001 VD_{139}	—	November 12, 2001	Sacramento Peak	SDSS	THB	2.3 km	MPC · JPL
827460	2001 WS_{22}	—	November 17, 2001	Kitt Peak	Deep Lens Survey	VER	2.4 km	MPC · JPL
827461	2001 WA_{72}	—	November 20, 2001	Socorro	LINEAR	·	510 m	MPC · JPL
827462	2001 WF_{84}	—	November 20, 2001	Socorro	LINEAR	·	1.7 km	MPC · JPL
827463	2001 WT_{106}	—	March 19, 2010	WISE	WISE	EUN	1.0 km	MPC · JPL
827464	2001 WJ_{107}	—	December 24, 2016	Haleakala	Pan-STARRS 1	·	850 m	MPC · JPL
827465	2001 XZ_{121}	—	December 14, 2001	Socorro	LINEAR	·	840 m	MPC · JPL
827466	2001 XW_{200}	—	December 15, 2001	Socorro	LINEAR	PHO	660 m	MPC · JPL
827467	2001 XM_{229}	—	December 15, 2001	Socorro	LINEAR	EUP	2.6 km	MPC · JPL
827468	2001 XX_{262}	—	December 13, 2001	Palomar	NEAT	·	530 m	MPC · JPL
827469	2001 XF_{265}	—	December 14, 2001	Socorro	LINEAR	·	870 m	MPC · JPL
827470	2001 XG_{265}	—	December 14, 2001	Kitt Peak	Spacewatch	H	360 m	MPC · JPL
827471	2001 XQ_{267}	—	November 17, 2001	Kitt Peak	Spacewatch	·	2.8 km	MPC · JPL
827472	2001 XR_{268}	—	August 6, 2005	Palomar	NEAT	·	1.1 km	MPC · JPL
827473	2001 XT_{268}	—	April 26, 2010	WISE	WISE	·	3.1 km	MPC · JPL
827474	2001 XU_{268}	—	December 15, 2001	Sacramento Peak	SDSS	H	490 m	MPC · JPL
827475	2001 XG_{269}	—	February 15, 2015	Haleakala	Pan-STARRS 1	(194)	1.3 km	MPC · JPL
827476	2001 YZ_{11}	—	October 20, 2001	Haleakala	NEAT	·	790 m	MPC · JPL
827477	2001 YN_{48}	—	December 18, 2001	Socorro	LINEAR	·	1.2 km	MPC · JPL
827478	2001 YA_{93}	—	December 17, 2001	Kitt Peak	Deep Lens Survey	EOS	1.2 km	MPC · JPL
827479	2001 YE_{93}	—	December 17, 2001	Kitt Peak	Deep Lens Survey	·	3.1 km	MPC · JPL
827480	2001 YL_{158}	—	December 18, 2001	Sacramento Peak	SDSS	EUN	1.2 km	MPC · JPL
827481	2001 YP_{158}	—	December 18, 2001	Sacramento Peak	SDSS	·	2.1 km	MPC · JPL
827482	2001 YS_{158}	—	December 18, 2001	Sacramento Peak	SDSS	KON	1.7 km	MPC · JPL
827483	2001 YZ_{158}	—	December 18, 2001	Sacramento Peak	SDSS	·	1.9 km	MPC · JPL
827484	2001 YD_{159}	—	December 18, 2001	Sacramento Peak	SDSS	·	2.5 km	MPC · JPL
827485	2001 YK_{159}	—	December 18, 2001	Sacramento Peak	SDSS	·	2.0 km	MPC · JPL
827486	2001 YG_{160}	—	December 18, 2001	Sacramento Peak	SDSS	ELF	3.1 km	MPC · JPL
827487	2001 YN_{160}	—	December 18, 2001	Sacramento Peak	SDSS	·	2.3 km	MPC · JPL
827488	2001 YO_{162}	—	November 21, 2009	Catalina	CSS	·	1.7 km	MPC · JPL
827489	2001 YF_{164}	—	December 18, 2001	Sacramento Peak	SDSS	·	1.8 km	MPC · JPL
827490	2001 YG_{164}	—	December 20, 2001	Kitt Peak	Spacewatch	·	2.6 km	MPC · JPL
827491	2001 YJ_{164}	—	September 22, 2012	Kitt Peak	Spacewatch	·	890 m	MPC · JPL
827492	2001 YK_{165}	—	February 10, 2010	Kitt Peak	Spacewatch	·	1.3 km	MPC · JPL
827493	2002 AG_{3}	—	January 8, 2002	Whipple	T. B. Spahr, Schroedter, M.	H	450 m	MPC · JPL
827494	2002 AR_{14}	—	January 11, 2002	Cerro Tololo	Deep Lens Survey	·	2.4 km	MPC · JPL
827495	2002 AS_{14}	—	January 11, 2002	Cerro Tololo	Deep Lens Survey	·	2.1 km	MPC · JPL
827496	2002 AD_{33}	—	January 6, 2002	Kitt Peak	Spacewatch	·	720 m	MPC · JPL
827497	2002 AS_{91}	—	January 11, 2002	Cerro Tololo	Deep Lens Survey	·	1.6 km	MPC · JPL
827498	2002 AQ_{92}	—	January 12, 2002	Cerro Tololo	Deep Lens Survey	·	1.5 km	MPC · JPL
827499	2002 AX_{92}	—	January 13, 2002	Cerro Tololo	Deep Lens Survey	EUN	810 m	MPC · JPL
827500	2002 AG_{129}	—	January 14, 2002	Socorro	LINEAR	·	1 km	MPC · JPL

== 827501–827600 ==
back to top

Designation			Discovery			Properties		Ref
Permanent	Provisional	Named after	Date	Site	Discoverer(s)	Category	Diam.	Ref
827501	2002 AC_{196}	—	January 13, 2002	Kitt Peak	Spacewatch	NYS	650 m	MPC · JPL
827502	2002 AZ_{211}	—	December 7, 2012	Haleakala	Pan-STARRS 1	·	1.6 km	MPC · JPL
827503	2002 AA_{212}	—	October 3, 2013	Mount Lemmon	Mount Lemmon Survey	·	1.2 km	MPC · JPL
827504	2002 AM_{212}	—	December 5, 2005	Kitt Peak	Spacewatch	·	850 m	MPC · JPL
827505	2002 AX_{212}	—	October 19, 2006	Kitt Peak	Spacewatch	·	2.2 km	MPC · JPL
827506	2002 AL_{213}	—	October 16, 2013	Mount Lemmon	Mount Lemmon Survey	·	960 m	MPC · JPL
827507	2002 AP_{213}	—	January 28, 2007	Catalina	CSS	H	560 m	MPC · JPL
827508	2002 AS_{213}	—	November 27, 2013	Haleakala	Pan-STARRS 1	·	930 m	MPC · JPL
827509	2002 AG_{214}	—	November 9, 2009	Mount Lemmon	Mount Lemmon Survey	·	870 m	MPC · JPL
827510	2002 AX_{216}	—	March 27, 2008	Mount Lemmon	Mount Lemmon Survey	·	1.5 km	MPC · JPL
827511	2002 BW_{33}	—	September 23, 2011	Kitt Peak	Spacewatch	V	490 m	MPC · JPL
827512	2002 CM_{253}	—	January 14, 2002	Palomar	NEAT	·	1.3 km	MPC · JPL
827513	2002 CT_{317}	—	December 27, 2005	Mount Lemmon	Mount Lemmon Survey	·	860 m	MPC · JPL
827514	2002 CY_{321}	—	February 13, 2002	Kitt Peak	Spacewatch	·	2.3 km	MPC · JPL
827515	2002 CQ_{324}	—	September 25, 2017	Haleakala	Pan-STARRS 1	HNS	630 m	MPC · JPL
827516	2002 CA_{325}	—	February 2, 2010	WISE	WISE	·	1.1 km	MPC · JPL
827517	2002 CX_{326}	—	February 13, 2002	Sacramento Peak	SDSS	·	2.6 km	MPC · JPL
827518	2002 DJ_{4}	—	February 16, 2002	Cerro Tololo	Deep Lens Survey	·	1.9 km	MPC · JPL
827519	2002 DL_{22}	—	February 20, 2002	Kitt Peak	Spacewatch	·	1.7 km	MPC · JPL
827520	2002 EW_{94}	—	March 19, 1993	La Silla	UESAC	·	2.8 km	MPC · JPL
827521	2002 EU_{104}	—	March 9, 2002	Palomar	NEAT	H	310 m	MPC · JPL
827522	2002 EY_{109}	—	March 9, 2002	Kitt Peak	Spacewatch	·	3.7 km	MPC · JPL
827523	2002 EM_{158}	—	March 5, 2002	Sacramento Peak	SDSS	L4	8.5 km	MPC · JPL
827524	2002 ER_{158}	—	March 5, 2002	Sacramento Peak	SDSS	·	2.5 km	MPC · JPL
827525	2002 EU_{158}	—	March 5, 2002	Sacramento Peak	SDSS	L4	6.1 km	MPC · JPL
827526	2002 EV_{158}	—	March 5, 2002	Sacramento Peak	SDSS	HNS	1.0 km	MPC · JPL
827527	2002 EY_{158}	—	March 5, 2002	Sacramento Peak	SDSS	·	2.3 km	MPC · JPL
827528	2002 EH_{159}	—	March 5, 2002	Sacramento Peak	SDSS	·	2.0 km	MPC · JPL
827529	2002 EX_{159}	—	March 5, 2002	Sacramento Peak	SDSS	EOS	1.4 km	MPC · JPL
827530	2002 EY_{159}	—	March 5, 2002	Sacramento Peak	SDSS	·	1.1 km	MPC · JPL
827531	2002 EW_{163}	—	March 10, 2002	Palomar	NEAT	H	400 m	MPC · JPL
827532	2002 EL_{166}	—	May 15, 2015	Haleakala	Pan-STARRS 1	MAR	930 m	MPC · JPL
827533	2002 EN_{167}	—	March 1, 2011	Mount Lemmon	Mount Lemmon Survey	WIT	940 m	MPC · JPL
827534	2002 EC_{168}	—	February 19, 2009	Kitt Peak	Spacewatch	·	500 m	MPC · JPL
827535	2002 EN_{168}	—	January 14, 2016	Haleakala	Pan-STARRS 1	·	540 m	MPC · JPL
827536	2002 EU_{168}	—	October 9, 2013	Kitt Peak	Spacewatch	·	990 m	MPC · JPL
827537	2002 EZ_{168}	—	September 14, 2007	Anderson Mesa	LONEOS	PHO	1.2 km	MPC · JPL
827538	2002 EV_{169}	—	September 10, 2015	Haleakala	Pan-STARRS 1	NYS	810 m	MPC · JPL
827539	2002 EB_{171}	—	January 8, 2016	Haleakala	Pan-STARRS 1	615	1.0 km	MPC · JPL
827540	2002 EK_{171}	—	April 29, 2014	Haleakala	Pan-STARRS 1	·	800 m	MPC · JPL
827541	2002 EO_{172}	—	March 9, 2002	Kitt Peak	Spacewatch	·	1.1 km	MPC · JPL
827542	2002 FO_{17}	—	March 18, 2002	Kitt Peak	Deep Ecliptic Survey	·	1.4 km	MPC · JPL
827543	2002 FD_{23}	—	March 17, 2002	Kitt Peak	Spacewatch	·	1.1 km	MPC · JPL
827544	2002 FY_{42}	—	November 11, 2013	Kitt Peak	Spacewatch	·	940 m	MPC · JPL
827545	2002 FB_{44}	—	November 27, 2013	Haleakala	Pan-STARRS 1	·	790 m	MPC · JPL
827546	2002 GO_{3}	—	April 8, 2002	Palomar	NEAT	BAR	1.1 km	MPC · JPL
827547	2002 GS_{5}	—	April 11, 2002	Palomar	NEAT	·	1.0 km	MPC · JPL
827548	2002 GY_{5}	—	April 12, 2002	Palomar	NEAT	·	2.3 km	MPC · JPL
827549	2002 GU_{147}	—	April 13, 2002	Palomar	NEAT	·	1.4 km	MPC · JPL
827550	2002 GU_{180}	—	April 12, 2002	Palomar	NEAT	T_{j} (2.99)	3.1 km	MPC · JPL
827551	2002 GZ_{195}	—	April 8, 2002	Kitt Peak	Spacewatch	·	850 m	MPC · JPL
827552	2002 JS_{2}	—	April 22, 2002	Socorro	LINEAR	APO	720 m	MPC · JPL
827553	2002 JB_{68}	—	April 9, 2002	Socorro	LINEAR	BAR	950 m	MPC · JPL
827554	2002 JH_{151}	—	March 9, 2002	Kitt Peak	Spacewatch	·	2.4 km	MPC · JPL
827555	2002 LK_{64}	—	June 10, 2002	Palomar	NEAT	·	1.3 km	MPC · JPL
827556	2002 NR_{7}	—	July 9, 2002	Socorro	LINEAR	·	700 m	MPC · JPL
827557	2002 NG_{47}	—	July 14, 2002	Palomar	NEAT	·	1.0 km	MPC · JPL
827558	2002 NA_{48}	—	July 4, 2002	Kitt Peak	Spacewatch	·	980 m	MPC · JPL
827559	2002 NE_{70}	—	July 9, 2002	Palomar	NEAT	EUP	2.7 km	MPC · JPL
827560	2002 NO_{76}	—	April 12, 2010	WISE	WISE	·	2.1 km	MPC · JPL
827561	2002 OF_{5}	—	July 3, 2002	Palomar	NEAT	·	1.1 km	MPC · JPL
827562	2002 OU_{7}	—	July 18, 2002	Socorro	LINEAR	·	580 m	MPC · JPL
827563	2002 OW_{24}	—	August 27, 2002	Palomar Mountain	NEAT	·	520 m	MPC · JPL
827564	2002 OU_{29}	—	July 17, 2002	Palomar	NEAT	·	1.3 km	MPC · JPL
827565	2002 OB_{34}	—	July 29, 2002	Palomar	NEAT	TIR	2.0 km	MPC · JPL
827566	2002 OS_{38}	—	August 6, 2010	WISE	WISE	(194)	1.3 km	MPC · JPL
827567	2002 PJ_{3}	—	August 3, 2002	Palomar	NEAT	·	2.0 km	MPC · JPL
827568	2002 PY_{6}	—	July 22, 2002	Palomar	NEAT	·	1.4 km	MPC · JPL
827569	2002 PK_{10}	—	August 5, 2002	Palomar	NEAT	·	2.6 km	MPC · JPL
827570	2002 PL_{17}	—	August 6, 2002	Palomar	NEAT	·	1.3 km	MPC · JPL
827571	2002 PA_{32}	—	August 6, 2002	Palomar	NEAT	·	490 m	MPC · JPL
827572	2002 PL_{34}	—	August 7, 2002	Palomar	NEAT	T_{j} (2.96)	3.0 km	MPC · JPL
827573	2002 PA_{68}	—	August 6, 2002	Palomar	NEAT	ADE	1.5 km	MPC · JPL
827574	2002 PG_{80}	—	July 12, 2002	Palomar	NEAT	AMO	670 m	MPC · JPL
827575	2002 PQ_{112}	—	August 11, 2002	Palomar	NEAT	·	1.6 km	MPC · JPL
827576	2002 PP_{113}	—	August 15, 2002	Powell	Observatory, Powell	·	450 m	MPC · JPL
827577	2002 PU_{141}	—	August 8, 2002	Anderson Mesa	LONEOS	JUN	860 m	MPC · JPL
827578	2002 PE_{162}	—	July 6, 2002	Kitt Peak	Spacewatch	·	700 m	MPC · JPL
827579	2002 PO_{175}	—	August 11, 2002	Palomar	NEAT	3:2	4.1 km	MPC · JPL
827580	2002 PS_{175}	—	August 11, 2002	Palomar	NEAT	·	1.3 km	MPC · JPL
827581	2002 PY_{176}	—	August 11, 2002	Palomar	NEAT	·	840 m	MPC · JPL
827582	2002 PT_{177}	—	August 5, 2002	Palomar Mountain	NEAT	·	1.4 km	MPC · JPL
827583	2002 PC_{179}	—	August 15, 2002	Palomar	NEAT	·	1.3 km	MPC · JPL
827584	2002 PF_{192}	—	August 5, 2002	Campo Imperatore	CINEOS	·	520 m	MPC · JPL
827585	2002 PP_{193}	—	November 6, 2007	Kitt Peak	Spacewatch	·	1.3 km	MPC · JPL
827586	2002 PD_{194}	—	August 4, 2002	Palomar	NEAT	·	1.4 km	MPC · JPL
827587	2002 PB_{198}	—	July 20, 2002	Palomar	NEAT	T_{j} (2.97) · 3:2	4.5 km	MPC · JPL
827588	2002 PP_{198}	—	July 27, 2010	WISE	WISE	·	2.8 km	MPC · JPL
827589	2002 PU_{198}	—	August 14, 2002	Palomar	NEAT	·	1.8 km	MPC · JPL
827590	2002 PN_{203}	—	January 27, 2010	WISE	WISE	·	4.1 km	MPC · JPL
827591	2002 PR_{204}	—	October 12, 2010	Mount Lemmon	Mount Lemmon Survey	NYS	870 m	MPC · JPL
827592	2002 PX_{204}	—	August 15, 2002	Palomar	NEAT	PHO	790 m	MPC · JPL
827593	2002 PJ_{205}	—	September 22, 2014	Kitt Peak	Spacewatch	·	2.0 km	MPC · JPL
827594	2002 PD_{206}	—	August 4, 2002	Palomar	NEAT	·	550 m	MPC · JPL
827595	2002 PH_{206}	—	August 13, 2002	Palomar	NEAT	·	1.5 km	MPC · JPL
827596	2002 QY_{15}	—	August 27, 2002	Socorro	LINEAR	·	1.6 km	MPC · JPL
827597	2002 QO_{24}	—	August 13, 2002	Anderson Mesa	LONEOS	·	940 m	MPC · JPL
827598	2002 QN_{47}	—	September 1, 2002	Palomar	NEAT	·	1.3 km	MPC · JPL
827599	2002 QQ_{60}	—	August 26, 2002	Palomar	NEAT	·	2.0 km	MPC · JPL
827600	2002 QH_{62}	—	August 17, 2002	Palomar	NEAT	·	2.2 km	MPC · JPL

== 827601–827700 ==
back to top

Designation			Discovery			Properties		Ref
Permanent	Provisional	Named after	Date	Site	Discoverer(s)	Category	Diam.	Ref
827601	2002 QX_{75}	—	August 26, 2002	Palomar	NEAT	·	1.2 km	MPC · JPL
827602	2002 QO_{78}	—	August 17, 2002	Palomar	NEAT	·	430 m	MPC · JPL
827603	2002 QZ_{95}	—	August 16, 2002	Palomar	NEAT	EUN	830 m	MPC · JPL
827604	2002 QD_{101}	—	August 30, 2002	Palomar	NEAT	critical	1.3 km	MPC · JPL
827605	2002 QF_{103}	—	August 18, 2002	Palomar	NEAT	·	700 m	MPC · JPL
827606	2002 QP_{120}	—	August 29, 2002	Palomar	NEAT	·	1.1 km	MPC · JPL
827607	2002 QW_{121}	—	August 17, 2002	Palomar	NEAT	·	400 m	MPC · JPL
827608	2002 QZ_{122}	—	August 30, 2002	Palomar	NEAT	(5)	870 m	MPC · JPL
827609	2002 QY_{131}	—	August 30, 2002	Palomar	NEAT	·	1.4 km	MPC · JPL
827610	2002 QC_{133}	—	August 19, 2002	Palomar	NEAT	·	1.3 km	MPC · JPL
827611	2002 QK_{133}	—	August 19, 2002	Palomar	NEAT	·	530 m	MPC · JPL
827612	2002 QR_{133}	—	August 28, 2002	Palomar	NEAT	AEO	910 m	MPC · JPL
827613	2002 QX_{136}	—	August 6, 2002	Palomar	NEAT	·	920 m	MPC · JPL
827614	2002 QH_{137}	—	August 29, 2002	Palomar	NEAT	·	3.6 km	MPC · JPL
827615	2002 QC_{139}	—	August 17, 2002	Palomar	NEAT	H	420 m	MPC · JPL
827616	2002 QR_{140}	—	August 16, 2002	Palomar	NEAT	·	2.6 km	MPC · JPL
827617	2002 QE_{141}	—	April 11, 2010	WISE	WISE	·	3.2 km	MPC · JPL
827618	2002 QP_{141}	—	October 30, 2002	Sacramento Peak	SDSS	LIX	2.6 km	MPC · JPL
827619	2002 QC_{142}	—	October 30, 2002	Sacramento Peak	SDSS	KON	1.7 km	MPC · JPL
827620	2002 QK_{147}	—	August 29, 2002	Palomar	NEAT	·	1.1 km	MPC · JPL
827621	2002 QY_{152}	—	September 24, 2008	Kitt Peak	Spacewatch	·	2.1 km	MPC · JPL
827622	2002 QQ_{154}	—	April 25, 2006	Kitt Peak	Spacewatch	·	2.2 km	MPC · JPL
827623	2002 QE_{155}	—	September 3, 2002	Campo Imperatore	CINEOS	·	1.5 km	MPC · JPL
827624	2002 QU_{159}	—	August 19, 2002	Palomar	NEAT	·	880 m	MPC · JPL
827625	2002 QK_{160}	—	August 28, 2016	Mount Lemmon	Mount Lemmon Survey	·	1.4 km	MPC · JPL
827626	2002 RJ_{1}	—	September 1, 2002	Haleakala	NEAT	·	1.5 km	MPC · JPL
827627	2002 RP_{1}	—	August 30, 2002	Anderson Mesa	LONEOS	·	1.4 km	MPC · JPL
827628	2002 RS_{26}	—	September 4, 2002	Palomar	NEAT	·	1.5 km	MPC · JPL
827629	2002 RG_{30}	—	September 4, 2002	Anderson Mesa	LONEOS	·	620 m	MPC · JPL
827630	2002 RJ_{45}	—	September 5, 2002	Socorro	LINEAR	·	1.4 km	MPC · JPL
827631	2002 RN_{70}	—	August 27, 2002	Palomar	NEAT	·	1.1 km	MPC · JPL
827632	2002 RB_{120}	—	September 9, 2002	Palomar	NEAT	·	3.1 km	MPC · JPL
827633	2002 RC_{126}	—	September 10, 2002	Bro	Uppsala-DLR Asteroid Survey	·	2.8 km	MPC · JPL
827634	2002 RB_{130}	—	September 11, 2002	Palomar	NEAT	·	730 m	MPC · JPL
827635	2002 RK_{135}	—	September 10, 2002	Haleakala	NEAT	·	1.4 km	MPC · JPL
827636	2002 RU_{145}	—	September 11, 2002	Palomar	NEAT	·	860 m	MPC · JPL
827637	2002 RU_{151}	—	September 12, 2002	Palomar	NEAT	·	2.0 km	MPC · JPL
827638	2002 RZ_{160}	—	August 29, 2002	Kitt Peak	Spacewatch	·	420 m	MPC · JPL
827639	2002 RM_{167}	—	September 13, 2002	Palomar	NEAT	·	2.1 km	MPC · JPL
827640	2002 RJ_{181}	—	August 29, 2002	Kitt Peak	Spacewatch	H	320 m	MPC · JPL
827641	2002 RZ_{186}	—	September 12, 2002	Palomar	NEAT	·	1.4 km	MPC · JPL
827642	2002 RO_{188}	—	August 31, 2002	Anderson Mesa	LONEOS	·	940 m	MPC · JPL
827643	2002 RR_{190}	—	September 13, 2002	Palomar	NEAT	(5)	1.1 km	MPC · JPL
827644	2002 RW_{209}	—	September 15, 2002	Kitt Peak	Spacewatch	·	1.1 km	MPC · JPL
827645	2002 RX_{210}	—	September 15, 2002	Kitt Peak	Spacewatch	(883)	630 m	MPC · JPL
827646	2002 RS_{218}	—	September 9, 2002	Campo Imperatore	CINEOS	(5)	1.1 km	MPC · JPL
827647	2002 RA_{245}	—	September 15, 2002	Palomar	NEAT	·	1.3 km	MPC · JPL
827648	2002 RZ_{248}	—	October 5, 2002	Sacramento Peak	SDSS	·	730 m	MPC · JPL
827649	2002 RC_{251}	—	October 10, 2002	Sacramento Peak	SDSS	·	1.1 km	MPC · JPL
827650	2002 RY_{251}	—	September 5, 2002	Sacramento Peak	SDSS	3:2	3.1 km	MPC · JPL
827651	2002 RX_{252}	—	September 14, 2002	Palomar	NEAT	·	1.5 km	MPC · JPL
827652	2002 RA_{258}	—	September 14, 2002	Palomar	NEAT	TIR	2.4 km	MPC · JPL
827653	2002 RP_{264}	—	September 13, 2002	Palomar	NEAT	DOR	1.8 km	MPC · JPL
827654	2002 RH_{269}	—	September 14, 2002	Palomar	NEAT	·	1.4 km	MPC · JPL
827655	2002 RW_{269}	—	September 1, 2002	Palomar	NEAT	·	2.5 km	MPC · JPL
827656	2002 RY_{270}	—	August 15, 2002	Kitt Peak	Spacewatch	MIS	1.7 km	MPC · JPL
827657	2002 RR_{275}	—	September 14, 2002	Palomar	NEAT	·	510 m	MPC · JPL
827658	2002 RU_{279}	—	September 15, 2002	Palomar	NEAT	·	1 km	MPC · JPL
827659	2002 RU_{280}	—	September 15, 2002	Palomar	NEAT	·	750 m	MPC · JPL
827660	2002 RL_{286}	—	September 5, 2002	Sacramento Peak	SDSS	PHO	750 m	MPC · JPL
827661	2002 RC_{287}	—	October 5, 2002	Sacramento Peak	SDSS	·	580 m	MPC · JPL
827662	2002 RZ_{294}	—	September 3, 2002	Campo Imperatore	CINEOS	·	900 m	MPC · JPL
827663	2002 RZ_{298}	—	September 13, 2002	Anderson Mesa	LONEOS	·	1.0 km	MPC · JPL
827664	2002 RH_{301}	—	May 11, 2010	WISE	WISE	·	2.3 km	MPC · JPL
827665	2002 RK_{301}	—	September 17, 2013	Mount Lemmon	Mount Lemmon Survey	NYS	640 m	MPC · JPL
827666	2002 SA_{2}	—	September 26, 2002	Palomar	NEAT	·	1.5 km	MPC · JPL
827667	2002 SA_{15}	—	September 27, 2002	Palomar	NEAT	·	1.7 km	MPC · JPL
827668	2002 SD_{17}	—	September 28, 2002	Needville	J. Dellinger, P. G. A. Garossino	·	800 m	MPC · JPL
827669	2002 SY_{26}	—	September 17, 2002	Haleakala	NEAT	·	530 m	MPC · JPL
827670	2002 SW_{64}	—	October 5, 2002	Sacramento Peak	SDSS	EUN	1.3 km	MPC · JPL
827671	2002 SS_{74}	—	November 5, 2007	Kitt Peak	Spacewatch	·	1.1 km	MPC · JPL
827672	2002 TA_{49}	—	October 2, 2002	Socorro	LINEAR	·	800 m	MPC · JPL
827673	2002 TT_{58}	—	September 28, 2002	Haleakala	NEAT	·	1.5 km	MPC · JPL
827674	2002 TL_{63}	—	October 3, 2002	Campo Imperatore	CINEOS	·	1.3 km	MPC · JPL
827675	2002 TR_{75}	—	October 1, 2002	Anderson Mesa	LONEOS	·	530 m	MPC · JPL
827676	2002 TZ_{99}	—	October 4, 2002	Anderson Mesa	LONEOS	T_{j} (2.92)	2.3 km	MPC · JPL
827677	2002 TW_{103}	—	October 4, 2002	Socorro	LINEAR	KON	1.9 km	MPC · JPL
827678	2002 TS_{132}	—	September 28, 2002	Haleakala	NEAT	ADE	1.9 km	MPC · JPL
827679	2002 TN_{145}	—	October 3, 2002	Socorro	LINEAR	·	560 m	MPC · JPL
827680	2002 TX_{158}	—	October 5, 2002	Palomar	NEAT	·	470 m	MPC · JPL
827681	2002 TY_{160}	—	October 5, 2002	Palomar	NEAT	H	400 m	MPC · JPL
827682	2002 TY_{168}	—	October 3, 2002	Palomar	NEAT	·	1.4 km	MPC · JPL
827683	2002 TE_{170}	—	October 3, 2002	Palomar	NEAT	·	2.5 km	MPC · JPL
827684	2002 TD_{173}	—	October 4, 2002	Socorro	LINEAR	·	1.7 km	MPC · JPL
827685	2002 TE_{194}	—	October 3, 2002	Socorro	LINEAR	·	880 m	MPC · JPL
827686	2002 TE_{218}	—	August 6, 2002	Bro	Uppsala-DLR Asteroid Survey	·	570 m	MPC · JPL
827687	2002 TJ_{255}	—	October 9, 2002	Socorro	LINEAR	·	2.2 km	MPC · JPL
827688	2002 TH_{304}	—	October 4, 2002	Sacramento Peak	SDSS	AEO	900 m	MPC · JPL
827689	2002 TS_{304}	—	October 4, 2002	Sacramento Peak	SDSS	·	820 m	MPC · JPL
827690	2002 TX_{304}	—	October 4, 2002	Sacramento Peak	SDSS	·	2.0 km	MPC · JPL
827691	2002 TJ_{305}	—	October 4, 2002	Sacramento Peak	SDSS	·	430 m	MPC · JPL
827692	2002 TC_{306}	—	October 4, 2002	Sacramento Peak	SDSS	·	1.3 km	MPC · JPL
827693	2002 TE_{306}	—	October 4, 2002	Sacramento Peak	SDSS	·	2.0 km	MPC · JPL
827694	2002 TE_{307}	—	October 4, 2002	Sacramento Peak	SDSS	·	2.6 km	MPC · JPL
827695	2002 TH_{307}	—	October 4, 2002	Sacramento Peak	SDSS	BAR	930 m	MPC · JPL
827696	2002 TR_{307}	—	December 22, 2003	Kitt Peak	Spacewatch	·	2.4 km	MPC · JPL
827697	2002 TU_{307}	—	October 4, 2002	Sacramento Peak	SDSS	·	2.1 km	MPC · JPL
827698	2002 TX_{307}	—	October 31, 2002	Sacramento Peak	SDSS	·	1.5 km	MPC · JPL
827699	2002 TZ_{307}	—	October 4, 2002	Sacramento Peak	SDSS	·	570 m	MPC · JPL
827700	2002 TD_{308}	—	October 4, 2002	Sacramento Peak	SDSS	·	1.6 km	MPC · JPL

== 827701–827800 ==
back to top

Designation			Discovery			Properties		Ref
Permanent	Provisional	Named after	Date	Site	Discoverer(s)	Category	Diam.	Ref
827701	2002 TJ_{308}	—	October 4, 2002	Sacramento Peak	SDSS	·	1.3 km	MPC · JPL
827702	2002 TO_{308}	—	October 4, 2002	Sacramento Peak	SDSS	·	2.3 km	MPC · JPL
827703	2002 TS_{308}	—	October 4, 2002	Sacramento Peak	SDSS	·	2.2 km	MPC · JPL
827704	2002 TW_{308}	—	October 4, 2002	Sacramento Peak	SDSS	·	2.3 km	MPC · JPL
827705	2002 TD_{309}	—	October 4, 2002	Sacramento Peak	SDSS	(1547)	1.1 km	MPC · JPL
827706	2002 TO_{309}	—	October 10, 2002	Palomar	NEAT	·	2.3 km	MPC · JPL
827707	2002 TQ_{309}	—	October 4, 2002	Sacramento Peak	SDSS	·	880 m	MPC · JPL
827708	2002 TX_{309}	—	October 4, 2002	Sacramento Peak	SDSS	·	1.7 km	MPC · JPL
827709	2002 TY_{309}	—	October 10, 2002	Sacramento Peak	SDSS	·	1.9 km	MPC · JPL
827710	2002 TF_{310}	—	October 4, 2002	Sacramento Peak	SDSS	ERI	1.1 km	MPC · JPL
827711	2002 TG_{310}	—	October 4, 2002	Sacramento Peak	SDSS	·	650 m	MPC · JPL
827712	2002 TH_{310}	—	October 4, 2002	Sacramento Peak	SDSS	·	1.3 km	MPC · JPL
827713	2002 TU_{310}	—	October 4, 2002	Sacramento Peak	SDSS	·	1.7 km	MPC · JPL
827714	2002 TV_{310}	—	October 4, 2002	Sacramento Peak	SDSS	(194)	1.5 km	MPC · JPL
827715	2002 TA_{311}	—	October 4, 2002	Sacramento Peak	SDSS	·	540 m	MPC · JPL
827716	2002 TD_{311}	—	October 4, 2002	Sacramento Peak	SDSS	EOS	1.6 km	MPC · JPL
827717	2002 TH_{311}	—	October 15, 2002	Palomar	NEAT	·	1.1 km	MPC · JPL
827718	2002 TX_{311}	—	October 4, 2002	Sacramento Peak	SDSS	·	1.4 km	MPC · JPL
827719	2002 TX_{312}	—	October 4, 2002	Sacramento Peak	SDSS	·	1.2 km	MPC · JPL
827720	2002 TZ_{312}	—	October 4, 2002	Sacramento Peak	SDSS	·	1.6 km	MPC · JPL
827721	2002 TG_{313}	—	October 4, 2002	Sacramento Peak	SDSS	·	3.0 km	MPC · JPL
827722	2002 TK_{313}	—	October 4, 2002	Sacramento Peak	SDSS	·	3.4 km	MPC · JPL
827723	2002 TM_{313}	—	October 4, 2002	Sacramento Peak	SDSS	·	1.4 km	MPC · JPL
827724	2002 TR_{313}	—	October 4, 2002	Sacramento Peak	SDSS	·	3.0 km	MPC · JPL
827725	2002 TT_{313}	—	October 4, 2002	Sacramento Peak	SDSS	·	1.6 km	MPC · JPL
827726	2002 TU_{313}	—	October 4, 2002	Sacramento Peak	SDSS	H	530 m	MPC · JPL
827727	2002 TY_{313}	—	October 4, 2002	Sacramento Peak	SDSS	(1547)	980 m	MPC · JPL
827728	2002 TC_{314}	—	October 4, 2002	Sacramento Peak	SDSS	DOR	2.0 km	MPC · JPL
827729	2002 TL_{314}	—	October 4, 2002	Sacramento Peak	SDSS	·	2.6 km	MPC · JPL
827730	2002 TM_{314}	—	October 4, 2002	Sacramento Peak	SDSS	·	2.1 km	MPC · JPL
827731	2002 TQ_{314}	—	October 4, 2002	Sacramento Peak	SDSS	EUN	820 m	MPC · JPL
827732	2002 TX_{314}	—	October 4, 2002	Sacramento Peak	SDSS	·	3.7 km	MPC · JPL
827733	2002 TA_{315}	—	October 4, 2002	Sacramento Peak	SDSS	GEF	1.2 km	MPC · JPL
827734	2002 TE_{315}	—	October 4, 2002	Sacramento Peak	SDSS	·	1.4 km	MPC · JPL
827735	2002 TK_{315}	—	October 4, 2002	Sacramento Peak	SDSS	·	1.3 km	MPC · JPL
827736	2002 TU_{315}	—	October 4, 2002	Sacramento Peak	SDSS	·	3.0 km	MPC · JPL
827737	2002 TX_{315}	—	October 4, 2002	Sacramento Peak	SDSS	·	1.6 km	MPC · JPL
827738	2002 TH_{316}	—	October 4, 2002	Sacramento Peak	SDSS	EUN	950 m	MPC · JPL
827739	2002 TL_{316}	—	October 4, 2002	Sacramento Peak	SDSS	EOS	1.3 km	MPC · JPL
827740	2002 TR_{316}	—	October 4, 2002	Sacramento Peak	SDSS	·	2.4 km	MPC · JPL
827741	2002 TS_{316}	—	October 4, 2002	Sacramento Peak	SDSS	·	1.7 km	MPC · JPL
827742	2002 TW_{316}	—	October 4, 2002	Sacramento Peak	SDSS	·	1.6 km	MPC · JPL
827743	2002 TM_{318}	—	October 5, 2002	Sacramento Peak	SDSS	·	2.1 km	MPC · JPL
827744	2002 TO_{318}	—	April 1, 2011	Mount Lemmon	Mount Lemmon Survey	·	2.1 km	MPC · JPL
827745	2002 TQ_{318}	—	October 5, 2002	Sacramento Peak	SDSS	·	2.2 km	MPC · JPL
827746	2002 TR_{318}	—	October 5, 2002	Sacramento Peak	SDSS	·	2.9 km	MPC · JPL
827747	2002 TW_{318}	—	October 5, 2002	Sacramento Peak	SDSS	·	880 m	MPC · JPL
827748	2002 TN_{319}	—	September 11, 2002	Palomar	NEAT	·	2.0 km	MPC · JPL
827749	2002 TQ_{319}	—	October 5, 2002	Sacramento Peak	SDSS	·	560 m	MPC · JPL
827750	2002 TT_{319}	—	October 5, 2013	Mount Lemmon	Mount Lemmon Survey	·	1.6 km	MPC · JPL
827751	2002 TX_{319}	—	October 5, 2002	Sacramento Peak	SDSS	·	1.1 km	MPC · JPL
827752	2002 TU_{321}	—	October 5, 2002	Sacramento Peak	SDSS	·	1.1 km	MPC · JPL
827753	2002 TB_{322}	—	October 5, 2002	Sacramento Peak	SDSS	·	2.3 km	MPC · JPL
827754	2002 TJ_{322}	—	October 5, 2002	Sacramento Peak	SDSS	·	3.4 km	MPC · JPL
827755	2002 TV_{322}	—	October 5, 2002	Sacramento Peak	SDSS	·	1.9 km	MPC · JPL
827756	2002 TN_{323}	—	October 5, 2002	Sacramento Peak	SDSS	·	660 m	MPC · JPL
827757	2002 TX_{323}	—	October 5, 2002	Sacramento Peak	SDSS	·	910 m	MPC · JPL
827758	2002 TC_{324}	—	October 5, 2002	Sacramento Peak	SDSS	·	1.7 km	MPC · JPL
827759	2002 TL_{325}	—	October 5, 2002	Sacramento Peak	SDSS	·	1.4 km	MPC · JPL
827760	2002 TT_{325}	—	October 5, 2002	Sacramento Peak	SDSS	(5)	860 m	MPC · JPL
827761	2002 TX_{325}	—	October 5, 2002	Sacramento Peak	SDSS	EOS	1.3 km	MPC · JPL
827762	2002 TO_{326}	—	October 5, 2002	Sacramento Peak	SDSS	·	1.8 km	MPC · JPL
827763	2002 TU_{326}	—	October 1, 2002	Anderson Mesa	LONEOS	PHO	1.1 km	MPC · JPL
827764	2002 TO_{327}	—	October 5, 2002	Sacramento Peak	SDSS	·	1.4 km	MPC · JPL
827765	2002 TU_{327}	—	October 5, 2002	Palomar	NEAT	·	2.5 km	MPC · JPL
827766	2002 TZ_{327}	—	October 5, 2002	Sacramento Peak	SDSS	LIX	2.4 km	MPC · JPL
827767	2002 TG_{328}	—	October 5, 2002	Sacramento Peak	SDSS	HOF	1.8 km	MPC · JPL
827768	2002 TK_{328}	—	October 5, 2002	Sacramento Peak	SDSS	3:2	3.0 km	MPC · JPL
827769	2002 TU_{328}	—	October 5, 2002	Sacramento Peak	SDSS	·	900 m	MPC · JPL
827770	2002 TZ_{328}	—	October 5, 2002	Sacramento Peak	SDSS	·	550 m	MPC · JPL
827771	2002 TF_{329}	—	October 5, 2002	Sacramento Peak	SDSS	·	2.1 km	MPC · JPL
827772	2002 TO_{329}	—	September 16, 2002	Palomar	NEAT	·	1.6 km	MPC · JPL
827773	2002 TY_{329}	—	October 5, 2002	Sacramento Peak	SDSS	·	1.2 km	MPC · JPL
827774	2002 TN_{330}	—	October 5, 2002	Sacramento Peak	SDSS	·	1.7 km	MPC · JPL
827775	2002 TK_{331}	—	October 5, 2002	Sacramento Peak	SDSS	·	1.9 km	MPC · JPL
827776	2002 TC_{332}	—	October 5, 2002	Sacramento Peak	SDSS	·	2.1 km	MPC · JPL
827777	2002 TJ_{332}	—	October 5, 2002	Sacramento Peak	SDSS	·	1.7 km	MPC · JPL
827778	2002 TK_{332}	—	October 5, 2002	Sacramento Peak	SDSS	EOS	1.5 km	MPC · JPL
827779	2002 TL_{332}	—	October 5, 2002	Sacramento Peak	SDSS	·	2.9 km	MPC · JPL
827780	2002 TR_{332}	—	October 5, 2002	Sacramento Peak	SDSS	·	470 m	MPC · JPL
827781	2002 TT_{332}	—	October 5, 2002	Sacramento Peak	SDSS	KOR	910 m	MPC · JPL
827782	2002 TM_{333}	—	October 5, 2002	Sacramento Peak	SDSS	·	670 m	MPC · JPL
827783	2002 TV_{333}	—	March 14, 2004	Kitt Peak	Spacewatch	·	860 m	MPC · JPL
827784	2002 TB_{334}	—	October 5, 2002	Sacramento Peak	SDSS	·	2.2 km	MPC · JPL
827785	2002 TR_{334}	—	October 5, 2002	Sacramento Peak	SDSS	·	1.4 km	MPC · JPL
827786	2002 TW_{334}	—	October 5, 2002	Sacramento Peak	SDSS	·	1.1 km	MPC · JPL
827787	2002 TX_{334}	—	October 5, 2002	Sacramento Peak	SDSS	V	460 m	MPC · JPL
827788	2002 TN_{335}	—	October 5, 2002	Sacramento Peak	SDSS	·	1.2 km	MPC · JPL
827789	2002 TF_{336}	—	October 5, 2002	Sacramento Peak	SDSS	·	850 m	MPC · JPL
827790	2002 TJ_{336}	—	October 5, 2002	Sacramento Peak	SDSS	·	1.7 km	MPC · JPL
827791	2002 TK_{336}	—	October 5, 2002	Sacramento Peak	SDSS	·	2.7 km	MPC · JPL
827792	2002 TV_{336}	—	October 5, 2002	Sacramento Peak	SDSS	·	1.6 km	MPC · JPL
827793	2002 TB_{337}	—	October 5, 2002	Sacramento Peak	SDSS	·	1.9 km	MPC · JPL
827794	2002 TE_{337}	—	October 5, 2002	Sacramento Peak	SDSS	·	1.1 km	MPC · JPL
827795	2002 TK_{337}	—	October 5, 2002	Sacramento Peak	SDSS	·	2.5 km	MPC · JPL
827796	2002 TO_{337}	—	October 5, 2002	Sacramento Peak	SDSS	·	880 m	MPC · JPL
827797	2002 TY_{337}	—	October 5, 2002	Sacramento Peak	SDSS	AGN	960 m	MPC · JPL
827798	2002 TZ_{337}	—	October 10, 2002	Sacramento Peak	SDSS	·	1.3 km	MPC · JPL
827799	2002 TR_{338}	—	October 5, 2002	Sacramento Peak	SDSS	CLA	1.2 km	MPC · JPL
827800	2002 TX_{338}	—	October 5, 2002	Sacramento Peak	SDSS	·	1.4 km	MPC · JPL

== 827801–827900 ==
back to top

Designation			Discovery			Properties		Ref
Permanent	Provisional	Named after	Date	Site	Discoverer(s)	Category	Diam.	Ref
827801	2002 TC_{339}	—	October 5, 2002	Sacramento Peak	SDSS	·	1.1 km	MPC · JPL
827802	2002 TR_{339}	—	August 27, 2009	Kitt Peak	Spacewatch	·	670 m	MPC · JPL
827803	2002 TH_{340}	—	October 5, 2002	Sacramento Peak	SDSS	·	1.9 km	MPC · JPL
827804	2002 TP_{340}	—	October 15, 2002	Palomar	NEAT	·	1.1 km	MPC · JPL
827805	2002 TR_{340}	—	October 5, 2002	Sacramento Peak	SDSS	·	1.1 km	MPC · JPL
827806	2002 TW_{340}	—	October 5, 2002	Sacramento Peak	SDSS	·	870 m	MPC · JPL
827807	2002 TX_{340}	—	October 5, 2002	Sacramento Peak	SDSS	·	1.3 km	MPC · JPL
827808	2002 TA_{341}	—	October 4, 2002	Socorro	LINEAR	·	990 m	MPC · JPL
827809	2002 TB_{341}	—	October 5, 2002	Sacramento Peak	SDSS	·	1.7 km	MPC · JPL
827810	2002 TF_{341}	—	October 5, 2002	Sacramento Peak	SDSS	·	2.2 km	MPC · JPL
827811	2002 TQ_{341}	—	October 5, 2002	Sacramento Peak	SDSS	·	1.0 km	MPC · JPL
827812	2002 TC_{342}	—	October 5, 2002	Sacramento Peak	SDSS	EOS	1.4 km	MPC · JPL
827813	2002 TC_{343}	—	October 5, 2002	Sacramento Peak	SDSS	·	1.5 km	MPC · JPL
827814	2002 TH_{343}	—	October 5, 2002	Sacramento Peak	SDSS	·	1.1 km	MPC · JPL
827815	2002 TK_{343}	—	October 5, 2002	Sacramento Peak	SDSS	(5)	870 m	MPC · JPL
827816	2002 TL_{343}	—	October 5, 2002	Sacramento Peak	SDSS	PAD	1.3 km	MPC · JPL
827817	2002 TO_{343}	—	October 5, 2002	Sacramento Peak	SDSS	·	1.9 km	MPC · JPL
827818	2002 TQ_{343}	—	October 5, 2002	Sacramento Peak	SDSS	·	1.4 km	MPC · JPL
827819	2002 TT_{343}	—	October 5, 2002	Sacramento Peak	SDSS	EOS	1.7 km	MPC · JPL
827820	2002 TV_{343}	—	October 5, 2002	Sacramento Peak	SDSS	·	2.0 km	MPC · JPL
827821	2002 TA_{344}	—	October 5, 2002	Sacramento Peak	SDSS	V	450 m	MPC · JPL
827822	2002 TD_{344}	—	October 5, 2002	Sacramento Peak	SDSS	MAR	880 m	MPC · JPL
827823	2002 TN_{344}	—	October 15, 2002	Palomar	NEAT	·	1.6 km	MPC · JPL
827824	2002 TP_{344}	—	October 5, 2002	Sacramento Peak	SDSS	EOS	1.6 km	MPC · JPL
827825	2002 TR_{344}	—	October 5, 2002	Sacramento Peak	SDSS	·	2.3 km	MPC · JPL
827826	2002 TJ_{345}	—	December 29, 2003	Kitt Peak	Spacewatch	·	2.4 km	MPC · JPL
827827	2002 TP_{345}	—	October 5, 2002	Sacramento Peak	SDSS	·	2.9 km	MPC · JPL
827828	2002 TT_{345}	—	March 7, 2016	Haleakala	Pan-STARRS 1	·	2.0 km	MPC · JPL
827829	2002 TV_{345}	—	October 5, 2002	Sacramento Peak	SDSS	EOS	1.5 km	MPC · JPL
827830	2002 TD_{346}	—	October 5, 2002	Sacramento Peak	SDSS	·	910 m	MPC · JPL
827831	2002 TL_{346}	—	October 5, 2002	Sacramento Peak	SDSS	PHO	730 m	MPC · JPL
827832	2002 TN_{346}	—	October 5, 2002	Sacramento Peak	SDSS	·	790 m	MPC · JPL
827833	2002 TX_{346}	—	October 15, 2002	Palomar	NEAT	·	650 m	MPC · JPL
827834	2002 TC_{347}	—	October 5, 2002	Sacramento Peak	SDSS	·	520 m	MPC · JPL
827835	2002 TS_{347}	—	October 5, 2002	Sacramento Peak	SDSS	·	1.2 km	MPC · JPL
827836	2002 TA_{348}	—	October 5, 2002	Sacramento Peak	SDSS	·	2.7 km	MPC · JPL
827837	2002 TJ_{348}	—	October 5, 2002	Sacramento Peak	SDSS	EUN	840 m	MPC · JPL
827838	2002 TN_{348}	—	October 5, 2002	Sacramento Peak	SDSS	·	1.6 km	MPC · JPL
827839	2002 TO_{348}	—	October 5, 2002	Sacramento Peak	SDSS	·	1.9 km	MPC · JPL
827840	2002 TP_{348}	—	October 5, 2002	Sacramento Peak	SDSS	·	2.4 km	MPC · JPL
827841	2002 TY_{348}	—	October 5, 2002	Sacramento Peak	SDSS	·	3.5 km	MPC · JPL
827842	2002 TZ_{348}	—	October 5, 2002	Sacramento Peak	SDSS	·	1.8 km	MPC · JPL
827843	2002 TU_{349}	—	October 10, 2002	Sacramento Peak	SDSS	·	1.1 km	MPC · JPL
827844	2002 TA_{350}	—	October 10, 2002	Sacramento Peak	SDSS	·	1.8 km	MPC · JPL
827845	2002 TJ_{350}	—	October 10, 2002	Sacramento Peak	SDSS	·	2.9 km	MPC · JPL
827846	2002 TY_{350}	—	July 20, 2002	Palomar	NEAT	·	1.7 km	MPC · JPL
827847	2002 TK_{351}	—	October 10, 2002	Sacramento Peak	SDSS	·	1.5 km	MPC · JPL
827848	2002 TW_{351}	—	October 10, 2002	Sacramento Peak	SDSS	EOS	1.5 km	MPC · JPL
827849	2002 TX_{351}	—	October 10, 2002	Sacramento Peak	SDSS	·	1.3 km	MPC · JPL
827850	2002 TY_{351}	—	October 10, 2002	Sacramento Peak	SDSS	·	2.0 km	MPC · JPL
827851	2002 TU_{352}	—	September 12, 2002	Palomar	NEAT	·	760 m	MPC · JPL
827852	2002 TV_{352}	—	October 10, 2002	Sacramento Peak	SDSS	·	1.6 km	MPC · JPL
827853	2002 TM_{354}	—	October 10, 2002	Sacramento Peak	SDSS	·	1.6 km	MPC · JPL
827854	2002 TV_{354}	—	October 10, 2002	Sacramento Peak	SDSS	·	620 m	MPC · JPL
827855	2002 TX_{354}	—	October 10, 2002	Sacramento Peak	SDSS	·	880 m	MPC · JPL
827856	2002 TF_{356}	—	October 10, 2002	Sacramento Peak	SDSS	·	1.0 km	MPC · JPL
827857	2002 TG_{356}	—	October 10, 2002	Sacramento Peak	SDSS	·	1.7 km	MPC · JPL
827858	2002 TK_{356}	—	October 10, 2002	Sacramento Peak	SDSS	AGN	1.2 km	MPC · JPL
827859	2002 TY_{356}	—	October 10, 2002	Sacramento Peak	SDSS	·	810 m	MPC · JPL
827860	2002 TC_{358}	—	October 10, 2002	Sacramento Peak	SDSS	·	1.1 km	MPC · JPL
827861	2002 TK_{358}	—	October 10, 2002	Sacramento Peak	SDSS	·	940 m	MPC · JPL
827862	2002 TM_{358}	—	October 10, 2002	Sacramento Peak	SDSS	·	980 m	MPC · JPL
827863	2002 TO_{358}	—	October 10, 2002	Sacramento Peak	SDSS	KOR	1.0 km	MPC · JPL
827864	2002 TX_{359}	—	October 10, 2002	Sacramento Peak	SDSS	·	1.7 km	MPC · JPL
827865	2002 TY_{359}	—	October 10, 2002	Sacramento Peak	SDSS	·	2.6 km	MPC · JPL
827866	2002 TT_{360}	—	October 5, 2002	Sacramento Peak	SDSS	·	1.1 km	MPC · JPL
827867	2002 TY_{360}	—	October 10, 2002	Sacramento Peak	SDSS	(12739)	1.2 km	MPC · JPL
827868	2002 TJ_{361}	—	May 11, 2005	Kitt Peak	Spacewatch	·	740 m	MPC · JPL
827869	2002 TR_{361}	—	October 10, 2002	Sacramento Peak	SDSS	·	2.3 km	MPC · JPL
827870	2002 TZ_{361}	—	October 10, 2002	Sacramento Peak	SDSS	·	2.2 km	MPC · JPL
827871	2002 TB_{362}	—	October 10, 2002	Sacramento Peak	SDSS	·	2.3 km	MPC · JPL
827872	2002 TG_{362}	—	October 10, 2002	Sacramento Peak	SDSS	·	2.2 km	MPC · JPL
827873	2002 TO_{362}	—	October 10, 2002	Sacramento Peak	SDSS	·	740 m	MPC · JPL
827874	2002 TR_{362}	—	October 10, 2002	Sacramento Peak	SDSS	·	1.2 km	MPC · JPL
827875	2002 TD_{363}	—	October 10, 2002	Sacramento Peak	SDSS	HOF	2.0 km	MPC · JPL
827876	2002 TG_{363}	—	October 10, 2002	Sacramento Peak	SDSS	·	2.2 km	MPC · JPL
827877	2002 TH_{364}	—	October 10, 2002	Sacramento Peak	SDSS	·	960 m	MPC · JPL
827878	2002 TZ_{364}	—	October 10, 2002	Sacramento Peak	SDSS	TIR	1.9 km	MPC · JPL
827879	2002 TO_{365}	—	October 10, 2002	Sacramento Peak	SDSS	·	690 m	MPC · JPL
827880	2002 TY_{365}	—	October 10, 2002	Sacramento Peak	SDSS	·	1.6 km	MPC · JPL
827881	2002 TF_{366}	—	October 10, 2002	Sacramento Peak	SDSS	·	1.7 km	MPC · JPL
827882	2002 TG_{366}	—	October 10, 2002	Sacramento Peak	SDSS	·	1.4 km	MPC · JPL
827883	2002 TM_{366}	—	October 10, 2002	Sacramento Peak	SDSS	·	690 m	MPC · JPL
827884	2002 TC_{367}	—	October 10, 2002	Sacramento Peak	SDSS	·	2.4 km	MPC · JPL
827885	2002 TN_{367}	—	October 10, 2002	Sacramento Peak	SDSS	·	2.0 km	MPC · JPL
827886	2002 TT_{367}	—	October 10, 2002	Sacramento Peak	SDSS	·	1.9 km	MPC · JPL
827887	2002 TZ_{367}	—	October 10, 2002	Sacramento Peak	SDSS	EUN	960 m	MPC · JPL
827888	2002 TF_{368}	—	October 10, 2002	Sacramento Peak	SDSS	·	2.5 km	MPC · JPL
827889	2002 TG_{368}	—	October 10, 2002	Sacramento Peak	SDSS	·	1.5 km	MPC · JPL
827890	2002 TN_{368}	—	October 10, 2002	Sacramento Peak	SDSS	·	1.5 km	MPC · JPL
827891	2002 TS_{368}	—	October 10, 2002	Sacramento Peak	SDSS	·	2.2 km	MPC · JPL
827892	2002 TV_{368}	—	October 10, 2002	Sacramento Peak	SDSS	·	2.6 km	MPC · JPL
827893	2002 TA_{369}	—	October 10, 2002	Sacramento Peak	SDSS	·	1.1 km	MPC · JPL
827894	2002 TD_{369}	—	October 10, 2002	Sacramento Peak	SDSS	·	2.4 km	MPC · JPL
827895	2002 TM_{369}	—	October 10, 2002	Sacramento Peak	SDSS	·	520 m	MPC · JPL
827896	2002 TE_{370}	—	October 10, 2002	Sacramento Peak	SDSS	·	2.2 km	MPC · JPL
827897	2002 TG_{370}	—	October 10, 2002	Sacramento Peak	SDSS	·	1.6 km	MPC · JPL
827898	2002 TJ_{370}	—	October 10, 2002	Sacramento Peak	SDSS	·	1.0 km	MPC · JPL
827899	2002 TZ_{370}	—	October 10, 2002	Sacramento Peak	SDSS	·	1.4 km	MPC · JPL
827900	2002 TW_{371}	—	October 10, 2002	Sacramento Peak	SDSS	T_{j} (2.95) · 3:2	4.8 km	MPC · JPL

== 827901–828000 ==
back to top

Designation			Discovery			Properties		Ref
Permanent	Provisional	Named after	Date	Site	Discoverer(s)	Category	Diam.	Ref
827901	2002 TZ_{371}	—	October 10, 2002	Sacramento Peak	SDSS	EUN	1.1 km	MPC · JPL
827902	2002 TA_{373}	—	April 1, 2014	Mount Lemmon	Mount Lemmon Survey	·	1.3 km	MPC · JPL
827903	2002 TT_{376}	—	October 5, 2002	Palomar	NEAT	·	1.1 km	MPC · JPL
827904	2002 TK_{377}	—	October 9, 2002	Palomar	NEAT	DOR	2.1 km	MPC · JPL
827905	2002 TN_{381}	—	October 9, 2002	Palomar	NEAT	·	1.4 km	MPC · JPL
827906	2002 TB_{384}	—	October 29, 2002	Sacramento Peak	SDSS	·	2.6 km	MPC · JPL
827907	2002 TV_{384}	—	October 30, 2002	Sacramento Peak	SDSS	EUN	790 m	MPC · JPL
827908	2002 TX_{384}	—	October 4, 2002	Sacramento Peak	SDSS	MAR	930 m	MPC · JPL
827909	2002 TF_{391}	—	January 11, 2010	Kitt Peak	Spacewatch	·	3.0 km	MPC · JPL
827910	2002 TJ_{391}	—	May 19, 2010	WISE	WISE	·	1.6 km	MPC · JPL
827911	2002 TM_{392}	—	November 9, 2009	Kitt Peak	Spacewatch	·	480 m	MPC · JPL
827912	2002 TO_{392}	—	May 10, 2014	Haleakala	Pan-STARRS 1	·	1.0 km	MPC · JPL
827913	2002 TW_{392}	—	April 22, 2010	WISE	WISE	·	1.1 km	MPC · JPL
827914	2002 TB_{393}	—	February 10, 2007	Mount Lemmon	Mount Lemmon Survey	·	520 m	MPC · JPL
827915	2002 UV_{10}	—	October 28, 2002	Palomar	NEAT	·	700 m	MPC · JPL
827916	2002 UX_{10}	—	October 4, 2002	Socorro	LINEAR	JUN	770 m	MPC · JPL
827917	2002 UC_{14}	—	October 10, 2002	Palomar	NEAT	·	2.5 km	MPC · JPL
827918	2002 UR_{27}	—	October 31, 2002	Palomar	NEAT	·	1.6 km	MPC · JPL
827919	2002 UA_{37}	—	October 15, 2002	Palomar	NEAT	·	1.4 km	MPC · JPL
827920	2002 UW_{42}	—	October 30, 2002	Kitt Peak	Spacewatch	MAS	570 m	MPC · JPL
827921	2002 UZ_{43}	—	October 30, 2002	Kitt Peak	Spacewatch	NYS	1.0 km	MPC · JPL
827922	2002 US_{50}	—	August 14, 2002	Palomar	NEAT	·	1.1 km	MPC · JPL
827923	2002 UW_{50}	—	July 9, 2002	Socorro	LINEAR	·	1.4 km	MPC · JPL
827924	2002 UX_{50}	—	August 4, 2002	Palomar	NEAT	·	2.9 km	MPC · JPL
827925	2002 UL_{51}	—	October 29, 2002	Sacramento Peak	SDSS	·	2.8 km	MPC · JPL
827926	2002 UX_{52}	—	October 29, 2002	Sacramento Peak	SDSS	·	1.3 km	MPC · JPL
827927	2002 UO_{53}	—	October 29, 2002	Sacramento Peak	SDSS	·	1.4 km	MPC · JPL
827928	2002 UD_{54}	—	October 29, 2002	Sacramento Peak	SDSS	MAR	840 m	MPC · JPL
827929	2002 UH_{54}	—	October 29, 2002	Sacramento Peak	SDSS	·	1.8 km	MPC · JPL
827930	2002 UK_{54}	—	October 29, 2002	Sacramento Peak	SDSS	·	1.9 km	MPC · JPL
827931	2002 UP_{54}	—	October 29, 2002	Sacramento Peak	SDSS	·	950 m	MPC · JPL
827932	2002 UW_{54}	—	October 29, 2002	Sacramento Peak	SDSS	·	1.5 km	MPC · JPL
827933	2002 UD_{55}	—	October 30, 2002	Sacramento Peak	SDSS	·	2.0 km	MPC · JPL
827934	2002 UG_{55}	—	October 29, 2002	Sacramento Peak	SDSS	·	1.6 km	MPC · JPL
827935	2002 UQ_{55}	—	October 29, 2002	Sacramento Peak	SDSS	·	2.5 km	MPC · JPL
827936	2002 US_{55}	—	October 29, 2002	Sacramento Peak	SDSS	·	850 m	MPC · JPL
827937	2002 UP_{56}	—	October 29, 2002	Sacramento Peak	SDSS	·	2.6 km	MPC · JPL
827938	2002 UC_{57}	—	October 29, 2002	Sacramento Peak	SDSS	·	2.7 km	MPC · JPL
827939	2002 UJ_{57}	—	October 29, 2002	Sacramento Peak	SDSS	(5)	1.1 km	MPC · JPL
827940	2002 UQ_{57}	—	October 29, 2002	Sacramento Peak	SDSS	·	2.7 km	MPC · JPL
827941	2002 UH_{58}	—	October 29, 2002	Sacramento Peak	SDSS	·	1.5 km	MPC · JPL
827942	2002 UK_{58}	—	October 29, 2002	Sacramento Peak	SDSS	·	2.5 km	MPC · JPL
827943	2002 UN_{58}	—	October 29, 2002	Sacramento Peak	SDSS	EOS	1.6 km	MPC · JPL
827944	2002 UP_{58}	—	October 29, 2002	Sacramento Peak	SDSS	·	1.4 km	MPC · JPL
827945	2002 UQ_{58}	—	October 29, 2002	Sacramento Peak	SDSS	·	710 m	MPC · JPL
827946	2002 US_{58}	—	October 29, 2002	Sacramento Peak	SDSS	·	1.2 km	MPC · JPL
827947	2002 UD_{59}	—	October 29, 2002	Sacramento Peak	SDSS	WIT	910 m	MPC · JPL
827948	2002 UJ_{59}	—	October 29, 2002	Sacramento Peak	SDSS	·	2.5 km	MPC · JPL
827949	2002 UL_{59}	—	October 29, 2002	Sacramento Peak	SDSS	VER	2.4 km	MPC · JPL
827950	2002 UM_{59}	—	October 29, 2002	Sacramento Peak	SDSS	·	2.0 km	MPC · JPL
827951	2002 UY_{59}	—	October 29, 2002	Sacramento Peak	SDSS	·	920 m	MPC · JPL
827952	2002 UB_{60}	—	October 29, 2002	Sacramento Peak	SDSS	·	820 m	MPC · JPL
827953	2002 UJ_{60}	—	October 29, 2002	Sacramento Peak	SDSS	·	1.6 km	MPC · JPL
827954	2002 UP_{60}	—	October 29, 2002	Sacramento Peak	SDSS	VER	2.1 km	MPC · JPL
827955	2002 UC_{61}	—	October 29, 2002	Sacramento Peak	SDSS	·	1.8 km	MPC · JPL
827956	2002 UC_{62}	—	October 30, 2002	Sacramento Peak	SDSS	·	990 m	MPC · JPL
827957	2002 UC_{65}	—	October 30, 2002	Sacramento Peak	SDSS	·	2.0 km	MPC · JPL
827958	2002 UK_{65}	—	October 11, 2002	Socorro	LINEAR	·	1.0 km	MPC · JPL
827959	2002 UU_{65}	—	October 30, 2002	Sacramento Peak	SDSS	·	2.0 km	MPC · JPL
827960	2002 UY_{65}	—	October 7, 2002	Kitt Peak	Spacewatch	·	2.1 km	MPC · JPL
827961	2002 UZ_{66}	—	October 30, 2002	Sacramento Peak	SDSS	·	1.4 km	MPC · JPL
827962	2002 UE_{67}	—	October 30, 2002	Sacramento Peak	SDSS	·	1.3 km	MPC · JPL
827963	2002 UG_{67}	—	October 30, 2002	Sacramento Peak	SDSS	·	1.4 km	MPC · JPL
827964	2002 UN_{67}	—	October 30, 2002	Sacramento Peak	SDSS	·	2.2 km	MPC · JPL
827965	2002 UF_{68}	—	October 30, 2002	Sacramento Peak	SDSS	VER	2.8 km	MPC · JPL
827966	2002 UX_{68}	—	October 30, 2002	Sacramento Peak	SDSS	HNS	660 m	MPC · JPL
827967	2002 UJ_{69}	—	October 30, 2002	Sacramento Peak	SDSS	·	1.7 km	MPC · JPL
827968	2002 UM_{69}	—	October 30, 2002	Sacramento Peak	SDSS	·	1.6 km	MPC · JPL
827969	2002 UQ_{69}	—	October 30, 2002	Sacramento Peak	SDSS	·	1.6 km	MPC · JPL
827970	2002 UE_{71}	—	August 27, 2006	Kitt Peak	Spacewatch	·	690 m	MPC · JPL
827971	2002 UD_{72}	—	October 29, 2002	Palomar	NEAT	·	1.6 km	MPC · JPL
827972	2002 UV_{79}	—	May 7, 2010	WISE	WISE	T_{j} (2.98)	3.5 km	MPC · JPL
827973	2002 VF_{11}	—	November 1, 2002	Palomar	NEAT	·	1.8 km	MPC · JPL
827974	2002 VN_{37}	—	October 15, 2002	Palomar	NEAT	·	1.1 km	MPC · JPL
827975	2002 VL_{133}	—	November 5, 2002	Kitt Peak	Spacewatch	EUN	920 m	MPC · JPL
827976	2002 VS_{135}	—	November 7, 2002	Kitt Peak	Deep Ecliptic Survey	·	1.2 km	MPC · JPL
827977	2002 VT_{135}	—	November 7, 2002	Kitt Peak	Deep Ecliptic Survey	·	1.2 km	MPC · JPL
827978	2002 VE_{136}	—	November 14, 2002	Kitt Peak	Spacewatch	·	1.6 km	MPC · JPL
827979	2002 VB_{140}	—	November 13, 2002	Palomar	NEAT	EUN	1.0 km	MPC · JPL
827980	2002 VP_{140}	—	November 7, 2002	Kitt Peak	Spacewatch	·	1.1 km	MPC · JPL
827981	2002 VE_{144}	—	November 4, 2002	Palomar	NEAT	·	580 m	MPC · JPL
827982	2002 VM_{149}	—	October 31, 2002	Bro	Uppsala-DLR Asteroid Survey	·	2.2 km	MPC · JPL
827983	2002 VM_{150}	—	July 15, 2005	Mount Lemmon	Mount Lemmon Survey	·	460 m	MPC · JPL
827984	2002 VG_{152}	—	April 15, 2010	Mount Lemmon	Mount Lemmon Survey	·	1.9 km	MPC · JPL
827985	2002 VO_{152}	—	March 4, 2010	WISE	WISE	PHO	670 m	MPC · JPL
827986	2002 VY_{152}	—	September 29, 2008	Mount Lemmon	Mount Lemmon Survey	(895)	2.5 km	MPC · JPL
827987	2002 WZ	—	October 3, 2002	Palomar	NEAT	·	310 m	MPC · JPL
827988	2002 WE_{25}	—	November 25, 2002	Palomar	NEAT	·	1.3 km	MPC · JPL
827989	2002 WE_{32}	—	November 7, 2002	Kitt Peak	Spacewatch	·	510 m	MPC · JPL
827990	2002 XG_{31}	—	November 12, 2002	Bro	Uppsala-DLR Asteroid Survey	PHO	920 m	MPC · JPL
827991	2002 XQ_{40}	—	December 11, 2002	Socorro	LINEAR	APO	120 m	MPC · JPL
827992	2002 XB_{104}	—	December 5, 2002	Socorro	LINEAR	·	3.0 km	MPC · JPL
827993	2002 XV_{122}	—	September 16, 2006	Kitt Peak	Spacewatch	·	1.2 km	MPC · JPL
827994	2002 XR_{123}	—	May 12, 2015	Mount Lemmon	Mount Lemmon Survey	·	640 m	MPC · JPL
827995	2002 YQ_{28}	—	December 31, 2002	Socorro	LINEAR	·	2.7 km	MPC · JPL
827996	2002 YX_{36}	—	December 31, 2002	Kitt Peak	Spacewatch	T_{j} (2.98) · 3:2	5.2 km	MPC · JPL
827997	2003 AS_{83}	—	January 4, 2003	Kitt Peak	Deep Lens Survey	BRA	1.1 km	MPC · JPL
827998	2003 AO_{90}	—	January 5, 2003	Socorro	LINEAR	PHO	960 m	MPC · JPL
827999	2003 BS_{1}	—	January 27, 2003	Haleakala	NEAT	·	2.8 km	MPC · JPL
828000	2003 BQ_{97}	—	November 7, 2015	Mount Lemmon	Mount Lemmon Survey	GEF	870 m	MPC · JPL

back to top
