= List of minor planets: 794001–795000 =

The following is a partial list of minor planets, running from minor-planet number 794001 through 795000, inclusive. The primary data for this and other partial lists is based on JPL's "Small-Body Orbital Elements" and data available from the Minor Planet Center. Critical list information is also provided by the MPC, unless otherwise specified from Lowell Observatory. A detailed description of the table's columns and additional sources are given on the main page including a complete list of every page in this series, and a statistical break-up on the dynamical classification of minor planets.

Also see the summary list of all named bodies in numerical and alphabetical order, and the corresponding naming citations for the number range of this particular list. New namings may only be added to this list after official publication, as the preannouncement of names is condemned by the Working Group for Small Bodies Nomenclature of the International Astronomical Union.

Near-Earth obj.	MBA (inner)	MBA (outer)	Centaur
Mars-crosser	MBA (middle)	Jupiter trojan	Trans-Neptunian obj.
Unclassified

== 794001–794100 ==
Designation			Discovery			Properties		Ref
Permanent	Provisional	Named after	Date	Site	Discoverer(s)	Category	Diam.	Ref
794001	2005 UM_{406}	—	July 29, 2000	Cerro Tololo	Deep Ecliptic Survey	·	1.4 km	MPC · JPL
794002	2005 UB_{408}	—	October 31, 2005	Mount Lemmon	Mount Lemmon Survey	·	1.1 km	MPC · JPL
794003	2005 UO_{413}	—	October 25, 2005	Kitt Peak	Spacewatch	·	840 m	MPC · JPL
794004	2005 UB_{415}	—	October 25, 2005	Kitt Peak	Spacewatch	·	1.3 km	MPC · JPL
794005	2005 UC_{416}	—	October 25, 2005	Kitt Peak	Spacewatch	·	1.9 km	MPC · JPL
794006	2005 UP_{416}	—	October 25, 2005	Kitt Peak	Spacewatch	·	920 m	MPC · JPL
794007	2005 UN_{420}	—	October 25, 2005	Mount Lemmon	Mount Lemmon Survey	·	2.4 km	MPC · JPL
794008	2005 UT_{420}	—	October 25, 2005	Mount Lemmon	Mount Lemmon Survey	·	1.2 km	MPC · JPL
794009	2005 US_{423}	—	October 12, 2005	Kitt Peak	Spacewatch	3:2	3.9 km	MPC · JPL
794010	2005 UD_{429}	—	October 28, 2005	Mount Lemmon	Mount Lemmon Survey	·	1.4 km	MPC · JPL
794011	2005 US_{452}	—	October 29, 2005	Kitt Peak	Spacewatch	·	1.0 km	MPC · JPL
794012	2005 UC_{454}	—	October 30, 2005	Kitt Peak	Spacewatch	·	1.1 km	MPC · JPL
794013	2005 UA_{462}	—	September 25, 2005	Kitt Peak	Spacewatch	·	1.4 km	MPC · JPL
794014	2005 UY_{463}	—	October 30, 2005	Kitt Peak	Spacewatch	·	2.3 km	MPC · JPL
794015	2005 UW_{484}	—	October 10, 2005	Catalina	CSS	·	1.3 km	MPC · JPL
794016	2005 UZ_{514}	—	October 27, 2005	Sacramento Peak	SDSS Collaboration	·	1.6 km	MPC · JPL
794017	2005 UP_{517}	—	October 1, 2005	Sacramento Peak	SDSS Collaboration	·	2.0 km	MPC · JPL
794018	2005 US_{518}	—	October 1, 2005	Sacramento Peak	SDSS Collaboration	·	1.6 km	MPC · JPL
794019	2005 UL_{519}	—	October 12, 2005	Kitt Peak	Spacewatch	·	1.9 km	MPC · JPL
794020	2005 UB_{523}	—	October 30, 2005	Sacramento Peak	SDSS Collaboration	VER	2.1 km	MPC · JPL
794021	2005 UE_{529}	—	October 24, 2005	Kitt Peak	Spacewatch	KOR	1.1 km	MPC · JPL
794022	2005 UA_{530}	—	October 24, 2005	Kitt Peak	Spacewatch	TIR	2.0 km	MPC · JPL
794023	2005 UD_{537}	—	October 29, 2005	Kitt Peak	Spacewatch	·	1.3 km	MPC · JPL
794024	2005 UJ_{540}	—	November 13, 2017	Haleakala	Pan-STARRS 1	·	2.3 km	MPC · JPL
794025	2005 UJ_{542}	—	October 29, 2005	Kitt Peak	Spacewatch	·	770 m	MPC · JPL
794026	2005 UQ_{544}	—	November 19, 2016	Mount Lemmon	Mount Lemmon Survey	V	500 m	MPC · JPL
794027	2005 UU_{544}	—	April 4, 2008	Kitt Peak	Spacewatch	TIR	2.0 km	MPC · JPL
794028	2005 UZ_{544}	—	September 25, 2016	Haleakala	Pan-STARRS 1	·	2.1 km	MPC · JPL
794029	2005 UZ_{545}	—	October 22, 2005	Kitt Peak	Spacewatch	(11882)	1.2 km	MPC · JPL
794030	2005 UK_{546}	—	October 27, 2016	Haleakala	Pan-STARRS 1	·	820 m	MPC · JPL
794031	2005 UV_{546}	—	November 24, 2017	Haleakala	Pan-STARRS 1	·	2.1 km	MPC · JPL
794032	2005 UH_{548}	—	April 16, 2020	Mount Lemmon	Mount Lemmon Survey	·	1.9 km	MPC · JPL
794033	2005 UY_{549}	—	October 25, 2005	Mount Lemmon	Mount Lemmon Survey	·	1.0 km	MPC · JPL
794034	2005 UK_{550}	—	October 28, 2005	Kitt Peak	Spacewatch	·	1.5 km	MPC · JPL
794035	2005 UE_{552}	—	October 25, 2005	Mount Lemmon	Mount Lemmon Survey	EUN	900 m	MPC · JPL
794036	2005 UN_{552}	—	October 30, 2005	Kitt Peak	Spacewatch	(194)	1.2 km	MPC · JPL
794037	2005 UR_{552}	—	October 27, 2005	Kitt Peak	Spacewatch	·	960 m	MPC · JPL
794038	2005 UZ_{552}	—	October 25, 2005	Mount Lemmon	Mount Lemmon Survey	·	1.0 km	MPC · JPL
794039	2005 UB_{553}	—	October 26, 2005	Kitt Peak	Spacewatch	·	1.8 km	MPC · JPL
794040	2005 UF_{553}	—	October 30, 2005	Kitt Peak	Spacewatch	·	1.6 km	MPC · JPL
794041	2005 UW_{554}	—	October 30, 2005	Mount Lemmon	Mount Lemmon Survey	EOS	1.4 km	MPC · JPL
794042	2005 US_{556}	—	October 28, 2005	Kitt Peak	Spacewatch	LUT	2.9 km	MPC · JPL
794043	2005 UV_{557}	—	October 24, 2005	Kitt Peak	Spacewatch	·	1.1 km	MPC · JPL
794044	2005 UG_{558}	—	October 29, 2005	Mount Lemmon	Mount Lemmon Survey	·	1.9 km	MPC · JPL
794045	2005 UC_{559}	—	October 28, 2005	Kitt Peak	Spacewatch	·	1.3 km	MPC · JPL
794046	2005 UU_{560}	—	October 25, 2005	Mount Lemmon	Mount Lemmon Survey	·	1.2 km	MPC · JPL
794047	2005 VT_{4}	—	November 4, 2005	Piszkéstető	K. Sárneczky	·	540 m	MPC · JPL
794048	2005 VC_{12}	—	November 3, 2005	Mount Lemmon	Mount Lemmon Survey	HOF	2.2 km	MPC · JPL
794049	2005 VP_{16}	—	October 22, 2005	Catalina	CSS	·	1.5 km	MPC · JPL
794050	2005 VJ_{19}	—	November 1, 2005	Kitt Peak	Spacewatch	·	960 m	MPC · JPL
794051	2005 VR_{22}	—	October 25, 2005	Kitt Peak	Spacewatch	·	1.2 km	MPC · JPL
794052	2005 VJ_{28}	—	October 27, 2005	Kitt Peak	Spacewatch	VER	1.9 km	MPC · JPL
794053	2005 VP_{29}	—	October 31, 2005	Kitt Peak	Spacewatch	·	2.3 km	MPC · JPL
794054	2005 VV_{29}	—	November 4, 2005	Kitt Peak	Spacewatch	AEO	750 m	MPC · JPL
794055	2005 VD_{33}	—	November 5, 2005	Kitt Peak	Spacewatch	·	1.7 km	MPC · JPL
794056	2005 VD_{35}	—	October 6, 2005	Mount Lemmon	Mount Lemmon Survey	·	1.1 km	MPC · JPL
794057	2005 VV_{35}	—	October 6, 2005	Mount Lemmon	Mount Lemmon Survey	·	1.2 km	MPC · JPL
794058	2005 VH_{36}	—	November 3, 2005	Mount Lemmon	Mount Lemmon Survey	·	1.8 km	MPC · JPL
794059	2005 VB_{37}	—	November 3, 2005	Mount Lemmon	Mount Lemmon Survey	·	1.2 km	MPC · JPL
794060	2005 VO_{40}	—	November 4, 2005	Mount Lemmon	Mount Lemmon Survey	·	1.0 km	MPC · JPL
794061	2005 VF_{45}	—	November 4, 2005	Kitt Peak	Spacewatch	·	1.4 km	MPC · JPL
794062	2005 VU_{46}	—	November 3, 2005	Mount Lemmon	Mount Lemmon Survey	NEM	1.7 km	MPC · JPL
794063	2005 VG_{48}	—	November 5, 2005	Kitt Peak	Spacewatch	·	2.4 km	MPC · JPL
794064	2005 VT_{48}	—	November 5, 2005	Mount Lemmon	Mount Lemmon Survey	·	1.9 km	MPC · JPL
794065	2005 VV_{48}	—	November 5, 2005	Mount Lemmon	Mount Lemmon Survey	GEF	690 m	MPC · JPL
794066	2005 VP_{50}	—	October 23, 2005	Catalina	CSS	NYS	950 m	MPC · JPL
794067	2005 VM_{51}	—	November 3, 2005	Mount Lemmon	Mount Lemmon Survey	·	1.1 km	MPC · JPL
794068	2005 VR_{62}	—	September 1, 2005	Kitt Peak	Spacewatch	·	460 m	MPC · JPL
794069	2005 VN_{64}	—	November 3, 2005	Kitt Peak	Spacewatch	·	1.1 km	MPC · JPL
794070	2005 VN_{77}	—	October 27, 2005	Mount Lemmon	Mount Lemmon Survey	·	790 m	MPC · JPL
794071	2005 VM_{82}	—	October 26, 2005	Kitt Peak	Spacewatch	·	1.3 km	MPC · JPL
794072	2005 VP_{82}	—	October 26, 2005	Kitt Peak	Spacewatch	·	1.4 km	MPC · JPL
794073	2005 VW_{100}	—	November 1, 2005	Kitt Peak	Spacewatch	·	1.0 km	MPC · JPL
794074	2005 VL_{103}	—	November 1, 2005	Kitt Peak	Spacewatch	·	1.1 km	MPC · JPL
794075	2005 VS_{104}	—	November 3, 2005	Mount Lemmon	Mount Lemmon Survey	VER	2.0 km	MPC · JPL
794076	2005 VQ_{126}	—	October 30, 2005	Kitt Peak	Spacewatch	·	1.7 km	MPC · JPL
794077	2005 VZ_{127}	—	October 30, 2005	Sacramento Peak	SDSS Collaboration	HYG	1.7 km	MPC · JPL
794078	2005 VQ_{134}	—	November 1, 2005	Mauna Kea	P. A. Wiegert, D. D. Balam	·	2.3 km	MPC · JPL
794079	2005 VG_{135}	—	November 3, 2005	Catalina	CSS	·	870 m	MPC · JPL
794080	2005 VX_{137}	—	November 12, 2005	Kitt Peak	Spacewatch	ELF	3.1 km	MPC · JPL
794081	2005 VY_{138}	—	November 8, 2016	Catalina	CSS	PHO	920 m	MPC · JPL
794082	2005 VT_{141}	—	August 15, 2009	Kitt Peak	Spacewatch	·	1.2 km	MPC · JPL
794083	2005 VC_{142}	—	June 22, 2012	Kitt Peak	Spacewatch	·	1.1 km	MPC · JPL
794084	2005 VP_{146}	—	January 29, 2011	Mount Lemmon	Mount Lemmon Survey	·	1.1 km	MPC · JPL
794085	2005 VS_{146}	—	March 28, 2016	Mount Lemmon	Mount Lemmon Survey	·	1.3 km	MPC · JPL
794086	2005 VZ_{146}	—	October 6, 2016	Haleakala	Pan-STARRS 1	·	2.1 km	MPC · JPL
794087	2005 VK_{148}	—	November 10, 2005	Kitt Peak	Spacewatch	·	760 m	MPC · JPL
794088	2005 VJ_{152}	—	November 7, 2005	Mauna Kea	A. Boattini	·	1.8 km	MPC · JPL
794089	2005 VD_{154}	—	November 3, 2005	Mount Lemmon	Mount Lemmon Survey	EUN	770 m	MPC · JPL
794090	2005 VH_{155}	—	November 1, 2005	Kitt Peak	Spacewatch	·	2.2 km	MPC · JPL
794091	2005 VV_{155}	—	November 6, 2005	Mount Lemmon	Mount Lemmon Survey	·	2.2 km	MPC · JPL
794092	2005 VB_{158}	—	November 3, 2005	Mount Lemmon	Mount Lemmon Survey	·	2.9 km	MPC · JPL
794093	2005 WR_{9}	—	November 3, 2005	Kitt Peak	Spacewatch	MAS	580 m	MPC · JPL
794094	2005 WZ_{11}	—	November 22, 2005	Kitt Peak	Spacewatch	·	1.4 km	MPC · JPL
794095	2005 WF_{43}	—	November 21, 2005	Kitt Peak	Spacewatch	·	1.0 km	MPC · JPL
794096	2005 WF_{45}	—	November 22, 2005	Kitt Peak	Spacewatch	·	2.0 km	MPC · JPL
794097	2005 WZ_{54}	—	October 28, 2005	Mount Lemmon	Mount Lemmon Survey	·	920 m	MPC · JPL
794098	2005 WC_{93}	—	November 25, 2005	Mount Lemmon	Mount Lemmon Survey	MIS	1.8 km	MPC · JPL
794099	2005 WE_{110}	—	November 30, 2005	Kitt Peak	Spacewatch	·	1.6 km	MPC · JPL
794100	2005 WK_{111}	—	November 30, 2005	Kitt Peak	Spacewatch	VER	2.0 km	MPC · JPL

== 794101–794200 ==
back to top

Designation			Discovery			Properties		Ref
Permanent	Provisional	Named after	Date	Site	Discoverer(s)	Category	Diam.	Ref
794101	2005 WY_{125}	—	November 25, 2005	Mount Lemmon	Mount Lemmon Survey	·	940 m	MPC · JPL
794102	2005 WQ_{132}	—	November 25, 2005	Mount Lemmon	Mount Lemmon Survey	3:2	3.9 km	MPC · JPL
794103	2005 WX_{132}	—	November 25, 2005	Mount Lemmon	Mount Lemmon Survey	·	2.1 km	MPC · JPL
794104	2005 WA_{136}	—	November 26, 2005	Kitt Peak	Spacewatch	EUN	780 m	MPC · JPL
794105	2005 WM_{136}	—	September 23, 2005	Kitt Peak	Spacewatch	615	1.0 km	MPC · JPL
794106	2005 WK_{138}	—	November 12, 2005	Kitt Peak	Spacewatch	·	2.3 km	MPC · JPL
794107	2005 WD_{186}	—	November 1, 2005	Catalina	CSS	·	1.4 km	MPC · JPL
794108	2005 WR_{189}	—	October 24, 2001	Socorro	LINEAR	·	900 m	MPC · JPL
794109	2005 WX_{204}	—	November 25, 2005	Mount Lemmon	Mount Lemmon Survey	EOS	1.4 km	MPC · JPL
794110	2005 WX_{209}	—	November 25, 2005	Mauna Kea	P. A. Wiegert, D. D. Balam	·	2.0 km	MPC · JPL
794111	2005 WC_{217}	—	November 22, 2005	Kitt Peak	Spacewatch	·	2.5 km	MPC · JPL
794112	2005 WN_{217}	—	November 25, 2005	Mount Lemmon	Mount Lemmon Survey	·	1.2 km	MPC · JPL
794113	2005 WY_{219}	—	November 25, 2005	Kitt Peak	Spacewatch	·	1.1 km	MPC · JPL
794114	2005 WP_{220}	—	November 30, 2005	Kitt Peak	Spacewatch	·	2.1 km	MPC · JPL
794115	2005 WZ_{220}	—	November 26, 2005	Mount Lemmon	Mount Lemmon Survey	·	1.0 km	MPC · JPL
794116	2005 XN_{7}	—	December 4, 2005	Mount Lemmon	Mount Lemmon Survey	URS	2.3 km	MPC · JPL
794117	2005 XN_{19}	—	December 2, 2005	Kitt Peak	Spacewatch	·	1.1 km	MPC · JPL
794118	2005 XB_{44}	—	November 21, 2005	Kitt Peak	Spacewatch	·	2.0 km	MPC · JPL
794119	2005 XZ_{45}	—	November 6, 2005	Mount Lemmon	Mount Lemmon Survey	·	930 m	MPC · JPL
794120	2005 XW_{94}	—	October 2, 2005	Mount Lemmon	Mount Lemmon Survey	·	940 m	MPC · JPL
794121	2005 XJ_{95}	—	September 27, 2005	Kitt Peak	Spacewatch	V	490 m	MPC · JPL
794122	2005 XO_{95}	—	October 1, 2005	Mount Lemmon	Mount Lemmon Survey	·	1.8 km	MPC · JPL
794123	2005 XC_{97}	—	December 1, 2005	Kitt Peak	L. H. Wasserman, R. L. Millis	EOS	1.0 km	MPC · JPL
794124	2005 XX_{103}	—	December 1, 2005	Kitt Peak	L. H. Wasserman, R. L. Millis	·	1.2 km	MPC · JPL
794125	2005 XJ_{105}	—	December 1, 2005	Kitt Peak	L. H. Wasserman, R. L. Millis	·	920 m	MPC · JPL
794126	2005 XM_{119}	—	October 28, 2005	Kitt Peak	Spacewatch	KOR	1.1 km	MPC · JPL
794127	2005 XL_{122}	—	December 2, 2005	Kitt Peak	Spacewatch	·	950 m	MPC · JPL
794128	2005 XY_{122}	—	November 9, 2009	Mount Lemmon	Mount Lemmon Survey	·	1.2 km	MPC · JPL
794129	2005 XA_{130}	—	January 13, 2018	Haleakala	Pan-STARRS 1	·	2.3 km	MPC · JPL
794130	2005 XT_{130}	—	December 1, 2005	Kitt Peak	Spacewatch	·	2.7 km	MPC · JPL
794131	2005 XZ_{130}	—	December 8, 2005	Kitt Peak	Spacewatch	T_{j} (2.96)	3.5 km	MPC · JPL
794132	2005 XA_{132}	—	May 2, 2014	Mount Lemmon	Mount Lemmon Survey	·	2.4 km	MPC · JPL
794133	2005 XS_{132}	—	December 5, 2005	Kitt Peak	Spacewatch	AEO	800 m	MPC · JPL
794134	2005 XD_{133}	—	December 1, 2005	Kitt Peak	Spacewatch	·	1.4 km	MPC · JPL
794135	2005 XK_{133}	—	December 1, 2005	Kitt Peak	Spacewatch	·	1.3 km	MPC · JPL
794136	2005 XR_{134}	—	December 4, 2005	Kitt Peak	Spacewatch	·	970 m	MPC · JPL
794137	2005 XS_{134}	—	December 8, 2005	Kitt Peak	Spacewatch	THM	1.7 km	MPC · JPL
794138	2005 YW_{9}	—	December 21, 2005	Kitt Peak	Spacewatch	·	990 m	MPC · JPL
794139	2005 YK_{13}	—	December 22, 2005	Kitt Peak	Spacewatch	·	730 m	MPC · JPL
794140	2005 YL_{19}	—	December 24, 2005	Kitt Peak	Spacewatch	·	2.0 km	MPC · JPL
794141	2005 YQ_{22}	—	December 24, 2005	Kitt Peak	Spacewatch	·	1.4 km	MPC · JPL
794142	2005 YM_{23}	—	December 24, 2005	Kitt Peak	Spacewatch	EUN	930 m	MPC · JPL
794143	2005 YA_{41}	—	September 29, 2019	Haleakala	Pan-STARRS 1	KOR	920 m	MPC · JPL
794144	2005 YR_{50}	—	October 13, 2005	Kitt Peak	Spacewatch	T_{j} (2.93)	3.4 km	MPC · JPL
794145	2005 YN_{68}	—	December 26, 2005	Kitt Peak	Spacewatch	·	610 m	MPC · JPL
794146	2005 YY_{83}	—	July 5, 2000	Kitt Peak	Spacewatch	·	980 m	MPC · JPL
794147	2005 YM_{91}	—	December 26, 2005	Mount Lemmon	Mount Lemmon Survey	·	1.4 km	MPC · JPL
794148	2005 YU_{101}	—	December 25, 2005	Kitt Peak	Spacewatch	3:2	2.9 km	MPC · JPL
794149	2005 YH_{146}	—	December 29, 2005	Mount Lemmon	Mount Lemmon Survey	·	1.1 km	MPC · JPL
794150	2005 YG_{147}	—	December 29, 2005	Mount Lemmon	Mount Lemmon Survey	·	1.3 km	MPC · JPL
794151	2005 YN_{150}	—	December 25, 2005	Kitt Peak	Spacewatch	·	1.1 km	MPC · JPL
794152	2005 YF_{163}	—	December 27, 2005	Mount Lemmon	Mount Lemmon Survey	·	2.2 km	MPC · JPL
794153	2005 YG_{169}	—	December 30, 2005	Kitt Peak	Spacewatch	·	700 m	MPC · JPL
794154	2005 YO_{176}	—	December 22, 2005	Kitt Peak	Spacewatch	·	2.7 km	MPC · JPL
794155	2005 YR_{183}	—	December 27, 2005	Kitt Peak	Spacewatch	·	1.3 km	MPC · JPL
794156	2005 YN_{185}	—	December 28, 2005	Mount Lemmon	Mount Lemmon Survey	·	1.4 km	MPC · JPL
794157	2005 YP_{185}	—	December 28, 2005	Mount Lemmon	Mount Lemmon Survey	·	1.2 km	MPC · JPL
794158	2005 YT_{200}	—	December 22, 2005	Kitt Peak	Spacewatch	(13314)	1.5 km	MPC · JPL
794159	2005 YC_{216}	—	December 29, 2005	Mount Lemmon	Mount Lemmon Survey	·	1.3 km	MPC · JPL
794160	2005 YN_{226}	—	December 25, 2005	Kitt Peak	Spacewatch	·	1.1 km	MPC · JPL
794161	2005 YD_{234}	—	December 28, 2005	Kitt Peak	Spacewatch	LIX	2.5 km	MPC · JPL
794162	2005 YE_{244}	—	December 30, 2005	Kitt Peak	Spacewatch	·	1.2 km	MPC · JPL
794163	2005 YT_{283}	—	December 8, 2005	Kitt Peak	Spacewatch	·	1.4 km	MPC · JPL
794164	2005 YY_{283}	—	December 10, 2005	Kitt Peak	Spacewatch	HNS	960 m	MPC · JPL
794165	2005 YR_{297}	—	November 25, 2005	Kitt Peak	Spacewatch	·	1.0 km	MPC · JPL
794166	2006 AO_{17}	—	December 25, 2005	Mount Lemmon	Mount Lemmon Survey	·	1.4 km	MPC · JPL
794167	2006 AE_{28}	—	January 6, 2006	Kitt Peak	Spacewatch	·	1.4 km	MPC · JPL
794168	2006 AT_{29}	—	January 2, 2006	Mount Lemmon	Mount Lemmon Survey	VER	2.0 km	MPC · JPL
794169	2006 AS_{45}	—	January 4, 2006	Kitt Peak	Spacewatch	·	1.3 km	MPC · JPL
794170	2006 AM_{68}	—	December 6, 2005	Mount Lemmon	Mount Lemmon Survey	·	880 m	MPC · JPL
794171	2006 AO_{94}	—	January 8, 2006	Kitt Peak	Spacewatch	·	1.5 km	MPC · JPL
794172	2006 AM_{104}	—	January 8, 2006	Kitt Peak	Spacewatch	H	410 m	MPC · JPL
794173	2006 AU_{111}	—	January 5, 2006	Mount Lemmon	Mount Lemmon Survey	·	1.3 km	MPC · JPL
794174	2006 AX_{115}	—	January 5, 2006	Kitt Peak	Spacewatch	·	1.3 km	MPC · JPL
794175	2006 AT_{117}	—	January 7, 2006	Mount Lemmon	Mount Lemmon Survey	·	780 m	MPC · JPL
794176	2006 AY_{117}	—	January 7, 2006	Mount Lemmon	Mount Lemmon Survey	·	1.6 km	MPC · JPL
794177	2006 AY_{118}	—	January 7, 2006	Kitt Peak	Spacewatch	·	1.6 km	MPC · JPL
794178	2006 AZ_{118}	—	January 5, 2006	Kitt Peak	Spacewatch	·	1.4 km	MPC · JPL
794179	2006 BJ_{2}	—	January 5, 2006	Mount Lemmon	Mount Lemmon Survey	·	1.0 km	MPC · JPL
794180	2006 BY_{2}	—	November 4, 2005	Mount Lemmon	Mount Lemmon Survey	·	800 m	MPC · JPL
794181	2006 BK_{7}	—	January 10, 2006	Mount Lemmon	Mount Lemmon Survey	·	1.9 km	MPC · JPL
794182	2006 BG_{10}	—	January 20, 2006	Kitt Peak	Spacewatch	·	880 m	MPC · JPL
794183	2006 BW_{24}	—	January 8, 2006	Mount Lemmon	Mount Lemmon Survey	DOR	1.5 km	MPC · JPL
794184	2006 BX_{76}	—	January 23, 2006	Mount Lemmon	Mount Lemmon Survey	KOR	980 m	MPC · JPL
794185	2006 BD_{102}	—	January 23, 2006	Mount Lemmon	Mount Lemmon Survey	·	1.4 km	MPC · JPL
794186	2006 BC_{105}	—	January 25, 2006	Kitt Peak	Spacewatch	THM	1.7 km	MPC · JPL
794187	2006 BX_{105}	—	January 25, 2006	Kitt Peak	Spacewatch	·	1.1 km	MPC · JPL
794188	2006 BZ_{105}	—	January 25, 2006	Kitt Peak	Spacewatch	·	740 m	MPC · JPL
794189	2006 BJ_{113}	—	December 29, 1999	Mauna Kea	Veillet, C.	THM	1.9 km	MPC · JPL
794190	2006 BV_{124}	—	January 26, 2006	Kitt Peak	Spacewatch	·	1.9 km	MPC · JPL
794191	2006 BU_{127}	—	January 7, 2006	Mount Lemmon	Mount Lemmon Survey	·	1.1 km	MPC · JPL
794192	2006 BF_{161}	—	January 26, 2006	Kitt Peak	Spacewatch	·	1 km	MPC · JPL
794193	2006 BH_{163}	—	January 26, 2006	Mount Lemmon	Mount Lemmon Survey	H	400 m	MPC · JPL
794194	2006 BD_{171}	—	January 6, 2006	Kitt Peak	Spacewatch	(5)	950 m	MPC · JPL
794195	2006 BZ_{176}	—	January 27, 2006	Kitt Peak	Spacewatch	HOF	1.8 km	MPC · JPL
794196	2006 BR_{182}	—	January 27, 2006	Kitt Peak	Spacewatch	·	2.4 km	MPC · JPL
794197	2006 BX_{200}	—	January 7, 2006	Kitt Peak	Spacewatch	·	1.4 km	MPC · JPL
794198	2006 BJ_{235}	—	January 23, 2006	Kitt Peak	Spacewatch	MRX	760 m	MPC · JPL
794199	2006 BG_{255}	—	January 31, 2006	Kitt Peak	Spacewatch	·	1.3 km	MPC · JPL
794200	2006 BW_{255}	—	January 31, 2006	Kitt Peak	Spacewatch	·	2.3 km	MPC · JPL

== 794201–794300 ==
back to top

Designation			Discovery			Properties		Ref
Permanent	Provisional	Named after	Date	Site	Discoverer(s)	Category	Diam.	Ref
794201	2006 BT_{258}	—	January 19, 2015	Kitt Peak	Spacewatch	·	1.6 km	MPC · JPL
794202	2006 BG_{264}	—	January 31, 2006	Kitt Peak	Spacewatch	H	320 m	MPC · JPL
794203	2006 BL_{287}	—	February 17, 2015	Haleakala	Pan-STARRS 1	·	1.0 km	MPC · JPL
794204	2006 BC_{288}	—	September 3, 2008	Kitt Peak	Spacewatch	EUN	700 m	MPC · JPL
794205	2006 BZ_{289}	—	November 16, 2009	Mount Lemmon	Mount Lemmon Survey	·	970 m	MPC · JPL
794206	2006 BX_{293}	—	March 26, 2007	Mount Lemmon	Mount Lemmon Survey	THM	1.7 km	MPC · JPL
794207	2006 BW_{296}	—	September 13, 2013	Kitt Peak	Spacewatch	·	1.3 km	MPC · JPL
794208	2006 BW_{297}	—	January 31, 2006	Kitt Peak	Spacewatch	·	1.3 km	MPC · JPL
794209	2006 BX_{297}	—	January 23, 2006	Kitt Peak	Spacewatch	·	1.4 km	MPC · JPL
794210	2006 BM_{300}	—	January 31, 2006	Kitt Peak	Spacewatch	·	2.5 km	MPC · JPL
794211	2006 BZ_{302}	—	January 30, 2006	Kitt Peak	Spacewatch	·	1.6 km	MPC · JPL
794212	2006 BC_{303}	—	January 25, 2006	Kitt Peak	Spacewatch	·	1.0 km	MPC · JPL
794213	2006 BU_{303}	—	January 23, 2006	Kitt Peak	Spacewatch	·	860 m	MPC · JPL
794214	2006 BV_{303}	—	January 23, 2006	Kitt Peak	Spacewatch	·	1.7 km	MPC · JPL
794215	2006 BL_{304}	—	January 28, 2006	Kitt Peak	Spacewatch	·	2.2 km	MPC · JPL
794216	2006 CE_{20}	—	February 1, 2006	Mount Lemmon	Mount Lemmon Survey	·	1.8 km	MPC · JPL
794217	2006 CD_{47}	—	January 25, 2006	Kitt Peak	Spacewatch	·	1.3 km	MPC · JPL
794218	2006 CQ_{51}	—	February 4, 2006	Kitt Peak	Spacewatch	LIX	2.9 km	MPC · JPL
794219	2006 CG_{59}	—	February 6, 2006	Kitt Peak	Spacewatch	EOS	1.4 km	MPC · JPL
794220	2006 CQ_{72}	—	October 20, 2012	Haleakala	Pan-STARRS 1	·	950 m	MPC · JPL
794221	2006 CQ_{74}	—	February 3, 2006	Mauna Kea	P. A. Wiegert, R. Rasmussen	AGN	730 m	MPC · JPL
794222	2006 CQ_{75}	—	February 3, 2006	Mauna Kea	P. A. Wiegert, R. Rasmussen	·	480 m	MPC · JPL
794223	2006 CO_{83}	—	December 24, 2013	Mount Lemmon	Mount Lemmon Survey	(5)	880 m	MPC · JPL
794224	2006 CV_{89}	—	February 2, 2006	Mount Lemmon	Mount Lemmon Survey	·	1.2 km	MPC · JPL
794225	2006 CW_{89}	—	February 25, 2006	Mount Lemmon	Mount Lemmon Survey	·	920 m	MPC · JPL
794226	2006 CK_{92}	—	February 1, 2006	Kitt Peak	Spacewatch	EOS	1.3 km	MPC · JPL
794227	2006 CM_{92}	—	February 3, 2006	Mount Lemmon	Mount Lemmon Survey	THB	1.9 km	MPC · JPL
794228	2006 CY_{92}	—	February 25, 2006	Mount Lemmon	Mount Lemmon Survey	·	2.0 km	MPC · JPL
794229	2006 CA_{93}	—	August 26, 2022	Haleakala	Pan-STARRS 1	·	1.3 km	MPC · JPL
794230	2006 DR_{16}	—	February 1, 2006	Kitt Peak	Spacewatch	NYS	880 m	MPC · JPL
794231	2006 DM_{38}	—	February 20, 2006	Kitt Peak	Spacewatch	AGN	860 m	MPC · JPL
794232	2006 DX_{55}	—	February 24, 2006	Mount Lemmon	Mount Lemmon Survey	·	790 m	MPC · JPL
794233	2006 DP_{57}	—	February 24, 2006	Mount Lemmon	Mount Lemmon Survey	·	560 m	MPC · JPL
794234	2006 DW_{84}	—	February 24, 2006	Kitt Peak	Spacewatch	GEF	880 m	MPC · JPL
794235	2006 DD_{91}	—	January 26, 2006	Kitt Peak	Spacewatch	DOR	1.5 km	MPC · JPL
794236	2006 DG_{106}	—	February 25, 2006	Mount Lemmon	Mount Lemmon Survey	·	1.6 km	MPC · JPL
794237	2006 DF_{126}	—	February 25, 2006	Kitt Peak	Spacewatch	·	1.5 km	MPC · JPL
794238	2006 DX_{132}	—	February 25, 2006	Kitt Peak	Spacewatch	·	1.3 km	MPC · JPL
794239	2006 DF_{136}	—	February 25, 2006	Kitt Peak	Spacewatch	·	1.3 km	MPC · JPL
794240	2006 DB_{137}	—	February 25, 2006	Kitt Peak	Spacewatch	RAF	690 m	MPC · JPL
794241	2006 DO_{142}	—	February 25, 2006	Kitt Peak	Spacewatch	·	2.2 km	MPC · JPL
794242	2006 DV_{150}	—	February 25, 2006	Kitt Peak	Spacewatch	·	990 m	MPC · JPL
794243	2006 DK_{159}	—	February 27, 2006	Kitt Peak	Spacewatch	THM	1.7 km	MPC · JPL
794244	2006 DP_{162}	—	March 12, 2000	Kitt Peak	Spacewatch	·	2.4 km	MPC · JPL
794245	2006 DJ_{163}	—	February 27, 2006	Mount Lemmon	Mount Lemmon Survey	(5)	780 m	MPC · JPL
794246	2006 DN_{183}	—	February 27, 2006	Kitt Peak	Spacewatch	·	1.1 km	MPC · JPL
794247	2006 DC_{205}	—	January 27, 2006	Mount Lemmon	Mount Lemmon Survey	·	1.5 km	MPC · JPL
794248	2006 DO_{219}	—	February 24, 2006	Kitt Peak	Spacewatch	·	2.4 km	MPC · JPL
794249	2006 DQ_{224}	—	August 3, 2016	Haleakala	Pan-STARRS 1	MAR	680 m	MPC · JPL
794250	2006 DV_{224}	—	February 20, 2006	Kitt Peak	Spacewatch	·	1.7 km	MPC · JPL
794251	2006 DF_{227}	—	February 25, 2006	Mount Lemmon	Mount Lemmon Survey	AGN	850 m	MPC · JPL
794252	2006 EO_{7}	—	October 24, 2005	Mauna Kea	A. Boattini	LIX	2.6 km	MPC · JPL
794253	2006 EO_{8}	—	February 20, 2006	Kitt Peak	Spacewatch	·	950 m	MPC · JPL
794254	2006 ED_{21}	—	March 3, 2006	Kitt Peak	Spacewatch	·	1.1 km	MPC · JPL
794255	2006 EW_{27}	—	March 3, 2006	Kitt Peak	Spacewatch	·	1.3 km	MPC · JPL
794256	2006 EB_{28}	—	March 3, 2006	Kitt Peak	Spacewatch	·	1.3 km	MPC · JPL
794257	2006 ET_{30}	—	March 3, 2006	Kitt Peak	Spacewatch	·	1.4 km	MPC · JPL
794258	2006 EB_{75}	—	October 31, 2021	Haleakala	Pan-STARRS 1	MIS	1.9 km	MPC · JPL
794259	2006 EN_{78}	—	March 2, 2006	Mount Lemmon	Mount Lemmon Survey	T_{j} (2.98)	1.8 km	MPC · JPL
794260	2006 ET_{79}	—	September 25, 2017	Haleakala	Pan-STARRS 1	·	1.1 km	MPC · JPL
794261	2006 EG_{80}	—	January 11, 2018	Haleakala	Pan-STARRS 1	·	2.5 km	MPC · JPL
794262	2006 ER_{80}	—	September 18, 2014	Haleakala	Pan-STARRS 1	·	2.1 km	MPC · JPL
794263	2006 EM_{81}	—	September 3, 2013	Haleakala	Pan-STARRS 1	·	1.4 km	MPC · JPL
794264	2006 EW_{82}	—	March 5, 2006	Kitt Peak	Spacewatch	·	2.0 km	MPC · JPL
794265	2006 FQ_{55}	—	February 24, 2006	Kitt Peak	Spacewatch	HYG	2.1 km	MPC · JPL
794266	2006 FO_{59}	—	March 24, 2006	Kitt Peak	Spacewatch	·	540 m	MPC · JPL
794267	2006 FZ_{61}	—	March 29, 2006	Kitt Peak	Spacewatch	·	1.8 km	MPC · JPL
794268	2006 GL_{23}	—	April 2, 2006	Kitt Peak	Spacewatch	·	2.2 km	MPC · JPL
794269	2006 GS_{57}	—	November 21, 2017	Haleakala	Pan-STARRS 1	·	560 m	MPC · JPL
794270	2006 GH_{58}	—	March 23, 2015	Haleakala	Pan-STARRS 1	AGN	810 m	MPC · JPL
794271	2006 HH_{10}	—	April 19, 2006	Kitt Peak	Spacewatch	·	540 m	MPC · JPL
794272	2006 HZ_{15}	—	April 20, 2006	Kitt Peak	Spacewatch	·	450 m	MPC · JPL
794273	2006 HB_{73}	—	April 25, 2006	Kitt Peak	Spacewatch	·	2.2 km	MPC · JPL
794274	2006 HZ_{76}	—	April 25, 2006	Kitt Peak	Spacewatch	·	1.8 km	MPC · JPL
794275	2006 HT_{81}	—	April 26, 2006	Kitt Peak	Spacewatch	·	490 m	MPC · JPL
794276	2006 HY_{103}	—	April 30, 2006	Kitt Peak	Spacewatch	·	1.6 km	MPC · JPL
794277	2006 HN_{113}	—	April 25, 2006	Kitt Peak	Spacewatch	·	2.0 km	MPC · JPL
794278	2006 HE_{133}	—	March 4, 2006	Kitt Peak	Spacewatch	·	1.4 km	MPC · JPL
794279	2006 HB_{140}	—	April 26, 2006	Cerro Tololo	Deep Ecliptic Survey	·	1.2 km	MPC · JPL
794280	2006 HS_{140}	—	April 27, 2006	Cerro Tololo	Deep Ecliptic Survey	·	1.3 km	MPC · JPL
794281	2006 HU_{140}	—	April 27, 2006	Cerro Tololo	Deep Ecliptic Survey	·	1.6 km	MPC · JPL
794282	2006 HV_{156}	—	April 30, 2006	Kitt Peak	Spacewatch	H	460 m	MPC · JPL
794283	2006 JU	—	May 3, 2006	Mount Lemmon	Mount Lemmon Survey	AMO	410 m	MPC · JPL
794284	2006 JN_{32}	—	May 3, 2006	Kitt Peak	Spacewatch	·	1.4 km	MPC · JPL
794285	2006 JY_{50}	—	April 8, 2006	Kitt Peak	Spacewatch	·	870 m	MPC · JPL
794286	2006 JN_{59}	—	May 1, 2006	Kitt Peak	Deep Ecliptic Survey	·	1.9 km	MPC · JPL
794287	2006 JV_{61}	—	May 1, 2006	Mauna Kea	P. A. Wiegert	·	1.1 km	MPC · JPL
794288	2006 JP_{64}	—	May 1, 2006	Kitt Peak	Deep Ecliptic Survey	·	1.1 km	MPC · JPL
794289	2006 JS_{64}	—	May 1, 2006	Kitt Peak	Deep Ecliptic Survey	·	1.0 km	MPC · JPL
794290	2006 JL_{65}	—	May 1, 2006	Kitt Peak	Deep Ecliptic Survey	·	2.6 km	MPC · JPL
794291	2006 JG_{69}	—	May 1, 2006	Mauna Kea	P. A. Wiegert	KOR	880 m	MPC · JPL
794292	2006 JS_{90}	—	May 7, 2006	Mount Lemmon	Mount Lemmon Survey	·	1.5 km	MPC · JPL
794293	2006 KS_{5}	—	May 19, 2006	Mount Lemmon	Mount Lemmon Survey	·	2.0 km	MPC · JPL
794294	2006 KG_{17}	—	May 7, 2006	Mount Lemmon	Mount Lemmon Survey	T_{j} (2.96)	2.6 km	MPC · JPL
794295	2006 KL_{27}	—	April 30, 2006	Kitt Peak	Spacewatch	·	900 m	MPC · JPL
794296	2006 KX_{39}	—	May 25, 2006	Mount Lemmon	Mount Lemmon Survey	H	500 m	MPC · JPL
794297	2006 KS_{62}	—	May 22, 2006	Kitt Peak	Spacewatch	·	1.3 km	MPC · JPL
794298	2006 KF_{71}	—	May 22, 2006	Kitt Peak	Spacewatch	JUN	730 m	MPC · JPL
794299	2006 KN_{83}	—	April 25, 2006	Mount Lemmon	Mount Lemmon Survey	·	1.6 km	MPC · JPL
794300	2006 KQ_{93}	—	May 25, 2006	Kitt Peak	Spacewatch	·	1.2 km	MPC · JPL

== 794301–794400 ==
back to top

Designation			Discovery			Properties		Ref
Permanent	Provisional	Named after	Date	Site	Discoverer(s)	Category	Diam.	Ref
794301	2006 KY_{93}	—	May 25, 2006	Kitt Peak	Spacewatch	NYS	860 m	MPC · JPL
794302	2006 KO_{101}	—	May 26, 2006	Mount Lemmon	Mount Lemmon Survey	·	2.1 km	MPC · JPL
794303	2006 KE_{115}	—	May 29, 2006	Kitt Peak	Spacewatch	·	2.0 km	MPC · JPL
794304	2006 KH_{117}	—	May 29, 2006	Kitt Peak	Spacewatch	3:2 · SHU	3.7 km	MPC · JPL
794305	2006 KG_{126}	—	May 25, 2006	Mauna Kea	P. A. Wiegert	·	1.2 km	MPC · JPL
794306	2006 KX_{130}	—	May 25, 2006	Mauna Kea	P. A. Wiegert	·	1.1 km	MPC · JPL
794307	2006 KA_{137}	—	May 25, 2006	Mauna Kea	P. A. Wiegert	·	1.7 km	MPC · JPL
794308	2006 KR_{137}	—	May 25, 2006	Mauna Kea	P. A. Wiegert	KOR	870 m	MPC · JPL
794309	2006 KM_{138}	—	May 25, 2006	Mauna Kea	P. A. Wiegert	EOS	1.1 km	MPC · JPL
794310	2006 KN_{138}	—	September 15, 2013	Mount Lemmon	Mount Lemmon Survey	·	1.7 km	MPC · JPL
794311	2006 KQ_{140}	—	May 25, 2006	Mauna Kea	P. A. Wiegert	·	1.4 km	MPC · JPL
794312	2006 KV_{146}	—	May 15, 2013	Haleakala	Pan-STARRS 1	·	550 m	MPC · JPL
794313	2006 KF_{154}	—	March 10, 2016	Oukaïmeden	M. Ory	·	1.7 km	MPC · JPL
794314	2006 KG_{154}	—	October 10, 2015	Haleakala	Pan-STARRS 1	MAR	680 m	MPC · JPL
794315	2006 KZ_{154}	—	May 23, 2006	Kitt Peak	Spacewatch	·	1.5 km	MPC · JPL
794316	2006 KR_{155}	—	October 2, 2013	Mount Lemmon	Mount Lemmon Survey	THM	1.8 km	MPC · JPL
794317	2006 LX_{9}	—	June 1, 2006	Mount Lemmon	Mount Lemmon Survey	·	1.9 km	MPC · JPL
794318	2006 MP	—	June 16, 2006	Kitt Peak	Spacewatch	·	1.8 km	MPC · JPL
794319	2006 OH_{25}	—	July 19, 2006	Mauna Kea	P. A. Wiegert, D. Subasinghe	EOS	1.3 km	MPC · JPL
794320	2006 OP_{30}	—	July 19, 2006	Mauna Kea	P. A. Wiegert, D. Subasinghe	·	950 m	MPC · JPL
794321	2006 OR_{32}	—	July 19, 2006	Mauna Kea	P. A. Wiegert, D. Subasinghe	·	1.3 km	MPC · JPL
794322	2006 OV_{32}	—	February 27, 2009	Kitt Peak	Spacewatch	·	1.0 km	MPC · JPL
794323	2006 OC_{36}	—	November 5, 2007	Mount Lemmon	Mount Lemmon Survey	·	1.3 km	MPC · JPL
794324	2006 OU_{39}	—	January 14, 2008	Kitt Peak	Spacewatch	·	980 m	MPC · JPL
794325	2006 PA_{44}	—	August 14, 2006	Palomar Mountain	NEAT	·	660 m	MPC · JPL
794326	2006 QV_{7}	—	August 19, 2006	Kitt Peak	Spacewatch	·	1.3 km	MPC · JPL
794327	2006 QB_{24}	—	August 22, 2006	Siding Spring	SSS	H	530 m	MPC · JPL
794328	2006 QU_{46}	—	March 11, 2005	Kitt Peak	Deep Ecliptic Survey	·	600 m	MPC · JPL
794329	2006 QQ_{51}	—	August 12, 2006	Palomar Mountain	NEAT	·	670 m	MPC · JPL
794330	2006 QC_{52}	—	August 23, 2006	Palomar Mountain	NEAT	·	1.2 km	MPC · JPL
794331	2006 QC_{65}	—	August 19, 2006	Kitt Peak	Spacewatch	·	790 m	MPC · JPL
794332	2006 QK_{69}	—	August 21, 2006	Kitt Peak	Spacewatch	·	1.2 km	MPC · JPL
794333	2006 QJ_{85}	—	August 27, 2006	Kitt Peak	Spacewatch	·	1.2 km	MPC · JPL
794334	2006 QD_{87}	—	October 23, 2001	Socorro	LINEAR	·	1.4 km	MPC · JPL
794335	2006 QM_{87}	—	August 27, 2006	Kitt Peak	Spacewatch	T_{j} (2.98) · EUP	2.5 km	MPC · JPL
794336	2006 QE_{102}	—	August 27, 2006	Kitt Peak	Spacewatch	·	920 m	MPC · JPL
794337	2006 QF_{104}	—	August 27, 2006	Kitt Peak	Spacewatch	EOS	1.3 km	MPC · JPL
794338	2006 QO_{120}	—	August 17, 2006	Palomar Mountain	NEAT	·	780 m	MPC · JPL
794339	2006 QB_{132}	—	August 22, 2006	Palomar Mountain	NEAT	EUN	1.2 km	MPC · JPL
794340	2006 QF_{153}	—	August 19, 2006	Kitt Peak	Spacewatch	·	1.2 km	MPC · JPL
794341	2006 QP_{171}	—	August 22, 2006	Cerro Tololo	Deep Ecliptic Survey	ADE	890 m	MPC · JPL
794342	2006 QN_{179}	—	August 28, 2006	Kitt Peak	Spacewatch	·	1.3 km	MPC · JPL
794343	2006 QX_{179}	—	August 28, 2006	Kitt Peak	Spacewatch	·	2.6 km	MPC · JPL
794344	2006 QE_{180}	—	August 28, 2006	Kitt Peak	Spacewatch	·	2.1 km	MPC · JPL
794345	2006 QW_{185}	—	August 29, 2006	Kitt Peak	Spacewatch	·	1.0 km	MPC · JPL
794346	2006 QY_{186}	—	August 21, 2006	Kitt Peak	Spacewatch	EOS	1.2 km	MPC · JPL
794347	2006 QK_{192}	—	September 1, 2013	Mount Lemmon	Mount Lemmon Survey	·	620 m	MPC · JPL
794348	2006 QD_{193}	—	August 29, 2013	Haleakala	Pan-STARRS 1	·	620 m	MPC · JPL
794349	2006 QR_{195}	—	January 14, 2016	Haleakala	Pan-STARRS 1	(260)	2.7 km	MPC · JPL
794350	2006 QK_{197}	—	August 21, 2006	Kitt Peak	Spacewatch	·	1.6 km	MPC · JPL
794351	2006 QR_{198}	—	August 23, 2006	Palomar Mountain	NEAT	JUN	890 m	MPC · JPL
794352	2006 QA_{200}	—	December 18, 2007	Mount Lemmon	Mount Lemmon Survey	·	2.0 km	MPC · JPL
794353	2006 QR_{201}	—	February 3, 2017	Haleakala	Pan-STARRS 1	·	970 m	MPC · JPL
794354	2006 QL_{203}	—	August 28, 2006	Kitt Peak	Spacewatch	(883)	610 m	MPC · JPL
794355	2006 QB_{205}	—	August 19, 2006	Kitt Peak	Spacewatch	·	1.4 km	MPC · JPL
794356	2006 QV_{206}	—	August 19, 2006	Kitt Peak	Spacewatch	·	1.5 km	MPC · JPL
794357	2006 QV_{209}	—	August 21, 2006	Kitt Peak	Spacewatch	·	2.5 km	MPC · JPL
794358	2006 RZ_{5}	—	September 14, 2006	Kitt Peak	Spacewatch	·	2.3 km	MPC · JPL
794359	2006 RN_{12}	—	September 14, 2006	Kitt Peak	Spacewatch	·	1.2 km	MPC · JPL
794360	2006 RD_{45}	—	September 14, 2006	Kitt Peak	Spacewatch	·	1.9 km	MPC · JPL
794361	2006 RU_{64}	—	September 14, 2006	Kitt Peak	Spacewatch	·	960 m	MPC · JPL
794362	2006 RX_{70}	—	September 15, 2006	Kitt Peak	Spacewatch	·	620 m	MPC · JPL
794363	2006 RN_{76}	—	September 15, 2006	Kitt Peak	Spacewatch	KOR	930 m	MPC · JPL
794364	2006 RB_{84}	—	September 15, 2006	Kitt Peak	Spacewatch	·	870 m	MPC · JPL
794365	2006 RT_{105}	—	September 14, 2006	Mauna Kea	Masiero, J., R. Jedicke	·	1.4 km	MPC · JPL
794366	2006 RL_{111}	—	September 14, 2006	Mauna Kea	Masiero, J., R. Jedicke	·	1.6 km	MPC · JPL
794367	2006 RT_{113}	—	September 14, 2006	Mauna Kea	Masiero, J., R. Jedicke	·	750 m	MPC · JPL
794368	2006 RC_{116}	—	September 26, 2006	Mount Lemmon	Mount Lemmon Survey	KOR	1.1 km	MPC · JPL
794369	2006 RG_{116}	—	September 14, 2006	Mauna Kea	Masiero, J., R. Jedicke	·	410 m	MPC · JPL
794370	2006 RP_{124}	—	September 14, 2006	Kitt Peak	Spacewatch	·	930 m	MPC · JPL
794371	2006 RT_{124}	—	September 15, 2006	Kitt Peak	Spacewatch	·	1.4 km	MPC · JPL
794372	2006 RB_{125}	—	September 15, 2006	Kitt Peak	Spacewatch	·	520 m	MPC · JPL
794373	2006 RR_{125}	—	September 15, 2006	Kitt Peak	Spacewatch	TIR	1.6 km	MPC · JPL
794374	2006 SO_{3}	—	September 16, 2006	Kitt Peak	Spacewatch	·	1.9 km	MPC · JPL
794375	2006 SZ_{24}	—	September 18, 2006	Mauna Kea	D. D. Balam	·	1.9 km	MPC · JPL
794376	2006 SK_{66}	—	September 19, 2006	Kitt Peak	Spacewatch	THM	1.3 km	MPC · JPL
794377	2006 SG_{68}	—	September 19, 2006	Kitt Peak	Spacewatch	H	340 m	MPC · JPL
794378	2006 SG_{86}	—	September 18, 2006	Kitt Peak	Spacewatch	·	1.3 km	MPC · JPL
794379	2006 SS_{99}	—	September 18, 2006	Kitt Peak	Spacewatch	THM	1.6 km	MPC · JPL
794380	2006 SP_{104}	—	September 19, 2006	Kitt Peak	Spacewatch	THM	1.8 km	MPC · JPL
794381	2006 SN_{112}	—	September 23, 2006	Kitt Peak	Spacewatch	·	1.1 km	MPC · JPL
794382	2006 SQ_{136}	—	September 20, 2006	Catalina	CSS	·	660 m	MPC · JPL
794383	2006 SR_{146}	—	September 19, 2006	Kitt Peak	Spacewatch	·	560 m	MPC · JPL
794384	2006 SF_{155}	—	September 22, 2006	Anderson Mesa	LONEOS	BAR	830 m	MPC · JPL
794385	2006 SG_{161}	—	September 19, 2006	Kitt Peak	Spacewatch	·	540 m	MPC · JPL
794386	2006 SE_{170}	—	September 17, 2006	Kitt Peak	Spacewatch	EOS	1.3 km	MPC · JPL
794387	2006 SX_{170}	—	September 17, 2006	Kitt Peak	Spacewatch	KOR	920 m	MPC · JPL
794388	2006 SJ_{180}	—	September 25, 2006	Mount Lemmon	Mount Lemmon Survey	·	1.9 km	MPC · JPL
794389	2006 SZ_{180}	—	September 25, 2006	Mount Lemmon	Mount Lemmon Survey	·	1.2 km	MPC · JPL
794390	2006 ST_{181}	—	September 25, 2006	Mount Lemmon	Mount Lemmon Survey	·	1.6 km	MPC · JPL
794391	2006 SM_{200}	—	September 24, 2006	Kitt Peak	Spacewatch	BRA	1.2 km	MPC · JPL
794392	2006 SR_{204}	—	September 15, 2006	Kitt Peak	Spacewatch	·	1.9 km	MPC · JPL
794393	2006 SU_{204}	—	September 25, 2006	Mount Lemmon	Mount Lemmon Survey	·	1.1 km	MPC · JPL
794394	2006 SU_{209}	—	September 26, 2006	Mount Lemmon	Mount Lemmon Survey	·	860 m	MPC · JPL
794395	2006 SW_{210}	—	September 26, 2006	Mount Lemmon	Mount Lemmon Survey	·	1.9 km	MPC · JPL
794396	2006 SB_{222}	—	September 15, 2006	Kitt Peak	Spacewatch	·	2.5 km	MPC · JPL
794397	2006 SJ_{228}	—	September 18, 2006	Kitt Peak	Spacewatch	·	1.1 km	MPC · JPL
794398	2006 SL_{228}	—	September 26, 2006	Kitt Peak	Spacewatch	·	1.2 km	MPC · JPL
794399	2006 SL_{246}	—	September 26, 2006	Mount Lemmon	Mount Lemmon Survey	·	1.3 km	MPC · JPL
794400	2006 SM_{246}	—	September 26, 2006	Mount Lemmon	Mount Lemmon Survey	EOS	1.1 km	MPC · JPL

== 794401–794500 ==
back to top

Designation			Discovery			Properties		Ref
Permanent	Provisional	Named after	Date	Site	Discoverer(s)	Category	Diam.	Ref
794401	2006 SF_{248}	—	September 26, 2006	Mount Lemmon	Mount Lemmon Survey	·	1.4 km	MPC · JPL
794402	2006 SH_{251}	—	September 26, 2006	Kitt Peak	Spacewatch	·	1.4 km	MPC · JPL
794403	2006 SV_{255}	—	September 26, 2006	Mount Lemmon	Mount Lemmon Survey	·	920 m	MPC · JPL
794404	2006 SB_{264}	—	September 26, 2006	Kitt Peak	Spacewatch	EUP	2.0 km	MPC · JPL
794405	2006 SV_{266}	—	September 26, 2006	Kitt Peak	Spacewatch	·	1.3 km	MPC · JPL
794406	2006 SH_{285}	—	September 18, 2006	Kitt Peak	Spacewatch	·	900 m	MPC · JPL
794407	2006 SZ_{293}	—	September 17, 2006	Kitt Peak	Spacewatch	·	470 m	MPC · JPL
794408	2006 SP_{296}	—	September 25, 2006	Kitt Peak	Spacewatch	·	560 m	MPC · JPL
794409	2006 SN_{298}	—	September 25, 2006	Mount Lemmon	Mount Lemmon Survey	·	880 m	MPC · JPL
794410	2006 SU_{309}	—	September 17, 2006	Kitt Peak	Spacewatch	EOS	1.3 km	MPC · JPL
794411	2006 SO_{311}	—	September 19, 2006	Kitt Peak	Spacewatch	·	990 m	MPC · JPL
794412	2006 SR_{322}	—	September 27, 2006	Kitt Peak	Spacewatch	EUN	740 m	MPC · JPL
794413	2006 SV_{323}	—	September 27, 2006	Kitt Peak	Spacewatch	·	950 m	MPC · JPL
794414	2006 SE_{342}	—	September 28, 2006	Kitt Peak	Spacewatch	·	490 m	MPC · JPL
794415	2006 SQ_{344}	—	September 28, 2006	Kitt Peak	Spacewatch	·	1.4 km	MPC · JPL
794416	2006 SD_{377}	—	September 17, 2006	Sacramento Peak	SDSS Collaboration	·	1.4 km	MPC · JPL
794417	2006 SB_{380}	—	August 8, 2005	Cerro Tololo	Deep Ecliptic Survey	·	1.8 km	MPC · JPL
794418	2006 SE_{380}	—	September 18, 2006	Sacramento Peak	SDSS Collaboration	·	520 m	MPC · JPL
794419	2006 SS_{380}	—	September 27, 2006	Sacramento Peak	SDSS Collaboration	·	990 m	MPC · JPL
794420	2006 SB_{381}	—	September 16, 2006	Sacramento Peak	SDSS Collaboration	THB	1.5 km	MPC · JPL
794421	2006 SH_{387}	—	September 30, 2006	Sacramento Peak	SDSS Collaboration	·	1.3 km	MPC · JPL
794422	2006 SL_{395}	—	September 17, 2006	Mauna Kea	Masiero, J., R. Jedicke	·	810 m	MPC · JPL
794423	2006 SU_{395}	—	September 17, 2006	Mauna Kea	Masiero, J., R. Jedicke	THM	1.4 km	MPC · JPL
794424	2006 SE_{416}	—	September 17, 2006	Kitt Peak	Spacewatch	·	1.2 km	MPC · JPL
794425	2006 SK_{419}	—	September 18, 2006	Mauna Kea	P. A. Wiegert	EOS	1.5 km	MPC · JPL
794426	2006 SS_{423}	—	September 27, 2006	Mount Lemmon	Mount Lemmon Survey	·	670 m	MPC · JPL
794427	2006 SZ_{426}	—	October 29, 2010	Kitt Peak	Spacewatch	·	740 m	MPC · JPL
794428	2006 SZ_{427}	—	April 27, 2012	Haleakala	Pan-STARRS 1	·	730 m	MPC · JPL
794429	2006 ST_{430}	—	September 28, 2006	Kitt Peak	Spacewatch	EOS	1.3 km	MPC · JPL
794430	2006 SV_{431}	—	September 18, 2006	Kitt Peak	Spacewatch	·	1.6 km	MPC · JPL
794431	2006 SW_{436}	—	November 13, 2015	Mount Lemmon	Mount Lemmon Survey	·	800 m	MPC · JPL
794432	2006 SX_{440}	—	December 31, 2007	Mount Lemmon	Mount Lemmon Survey	THM	1.6 km	MPC · JPL
794433	2006 SJ_{441}	—	March 18, 2009	Mount Lemmon	Mount Lemmon Survey	·	1.2 km	MPC · JPL
794434	2006 SB_{445}	—	July 7, 2016	Haleakala	Pan-STARRS 1	·	1.4 km	MPC · JPL
794435	2006 SY_{447}	—	September 28, 2006	Catalina	CSS	·	1.2 km	MPC · JPL
794436	2006 SD_{449}	—	September 30, 2006	Kitt Peak	Spacewatch	·	1.4 km	MPC · JPL
794437	2006 SA_{450}	—	September 25, 2006	Kitt Peak	Spacewatch	·	1.4 km	MPC · JPL
794438	2006 SU_{450}	—	September 17, 2006	Kitt Peak	Spacewatch	HOF	1.9 km	MPC · JPL
794439	2006 SH_{451}	—	September 18, 2006	Kitt Peak	Spacewatch	HOF	1.7 km	MPC · JPL
794440	2006 SL_{452}	—	September 26, 2006	Kitt Peak	Spacewatch	·	1.4 km	MPC · JPL
794441	2006 SP_{452}	—	September 17, 2006	Kitt Peak	Spacewatch	·	1.4 km	MPC · JPL
794442	2006 SP_{453}	—	September 19, 2006	Kitt Peak	Spacewatch	·	1.2 km	MPC · JPL
794443	2006 SZ_{454}	—	September 25, 2006	Kitt Peak	Spacewatch	BRA	1.1 km	MPC · JPL
794444	2006 SK_{455}	—	September 25, 2006	Kitt Peak	Spacewatch	·	2.6 km	MPC · JPL
794445	2006 SM_{455}	—	September 26, 2006	Mount Lemmon	Mount Lemmon Survey	EUN	640 m	MPC · JPL
794446	2006 SQ_{458}	—	September 18, 2006	Kitt Peak	Spacewatch	·	1.4 km	MPC · JPL
794447	2006 SR_{460}	—	September 26, 2006	Mount Lemmon	Mount Lemmon Survey	·	1.2 km	MPC · JPL
794448	2006 SS_{460}	—	September 17, 2006	Kitt Peak	Spacewatch	·	1.2 km	MPC · JPL
794449	2006 SK_{461}	—	September 25, 2006	Kitt Peak	Spacewatch	·	1.1 km	MPC · JPL
794450	2006 ST_{461}	—	September 16, 2006	Kitt Peak	Spacewatch	EOS	1.2 km	MPC · JPL
794451	2006 SH_{462}	—	September 19, 2006	Kitt Peak	Spacewatch	EOS	1.3 km	MPC · JPL
794452	2006 SC_{463}	—	September 30, 2006	Mount Lemmon	Mount Lemmon Survey	PAD	1.2 km	MPC · JPL
794453	2006 SJ_{464}	—	September 19, 2006	Kitt Peak	Spacewatch	·	1.8 km	MPC · JPL
794454	2006 TV_{3}	—	October 2, 2006	Mount Lemmon	Mount Lemmon Survey	·	1.8 km	MPC · JPL
794455	2006 TK_{10}	—	September 17, 2006	Kitt Peak	Spacewatch	·	790 m	MPC · JPL
794456	2006 TF_{16}	—	October 2, 2006	Kitt Peak	Spacewatch	·	1.1 km	MPC · JPL
794457	2006 TZ_{31}	—	September 25, 2006	Kitt Peak	Spacewatch	·	1.2 km	MPC · JPL
794458	2006 TQ_{48}	—	September 26, 2006	Mount Lemmon	Mount Lemmon Survey	·	630 m	MPC · JPL
794459	2006 TJ_{57}	—	October 15, 2006	Kitt Peak	Spacewatch	·	1.3 km	MPC · JPL
794460	2006 TL_{87}	—	October 13, 2006	Kitt Peak	Spacewatch	·	990 m	MPC · JPL
794461	2006 TW_{90}	—	September 26, 2006	Mount Lemmon	Mount Lemmon Survey	EUN	880 m	MPC · JPL
794462	2006 TT_{102}	—	October 15, 2006	Kitt Peak	Spacewatch	·	2.1 km	MPC · JPL
794463	2006 TY_{102}	—	October 15, 2006	Kitt Peak	Spacewatch	·	800 m	MPC · JPL
794464	2006 TE_{106}	—	September 24, 2006	Kitt Peak	Spacewatch	·	2.1 km	MPC · JPL
794465	2006 TS_{114}	—	October 1, 2006	Sacramento Peak	SDSS Collaboration	EOS	1.2 km	MPC · JPL
794466	2006 TY_{114}	—	October 1, 2006	Sacramento Peak	SDSS Collaboration	·	1.2 km	MPC · JPL
794467	2006 TJ_{115}	—	October 1, 2006	Sacramento Peak	SDSS Collaboration	EOS	1.2 km	MPC · JPL
794468	2006 TN_{115}	—	October 1, 2006	Sacramento Peak	SDSS Collaboration	·	1.2 km	MPC · JPL
794469	2006 TC_{116}	—	October 2, 2006	Sacramento Peak	SDSS Collaboration	·	1.5 km	MPC · JPL
794470	2006 TD_{117}	—	October 3, 2006	Sacramento Peak	SDSS Collaboration	·	1.9 km	MPC · JPL
794471	2006 TH_{135}	—	October 11, 2006	Palomar Mountain	NEAT	·	1.4 km	MPC · JPL
794472	2006 TB_{136}	—	October 2, 2006	Mount Lemmon	Mount Lemmon Survey	(1547)	980 m	MPC · JPL
794473	2006 TR_{136}	—	January 4, 2016	Haleakala	Pan-STARRS 1	·	720 m	MPC · JPL
794474	2006 TD_{139}	—	October 28, 2017	Haleakala	Pan-STARRS 1	·	1.6 km	MPC · JPL
794475	2006 TS_{139}	—	October 2, 2006	Mount Lemmon	Mount Lemmon Survey	·	1.1 km	MPC · JPL
794476	2006 TC_{140}	—	October 2, 2006	Mount Lemmon	Mount Lemmon Survey	KOR	980 m	MPC · JPL
794477	2006 TR_{141}	—	October 2, 2006	Mount Lemmon	Mount Lemmon Survey	·	840 m	MPC · JPL
794478	2006 TU_{141}	—	September 18, 2006	Catalina	CSS	·	750 m	MPC · JPL
794479	2006 TW_{141}	—	October 1, 2006	Kitt Peak	Spacewatch	EUN	840 m	MPC · JPL
794480	2006 TL_{143}	—	October 11, 2006	Kitt Peak	Spacewatch	·	1.4 km	MPC · JPL
794481	2006 TY_{143}	—	October 2, 2006	Mount Lemmon	Mount Lemmon Survey	·	1.8 km	MPC · JPL
794482	2006 TL_{146}	—	October 2, 2006	Mount Lemmon	Mount Lemmon Survey	KOR	1.0 km	MPC · JPL
794483	2006 TU_{146}	—	October 2, 2006	Mount Lemmon	Mount Lemmon Survey	HNS	740 m	MPC · JPL
794484	2006 UC_{6}	—	October 16, 2006	Kitt Peak	Spacewatch	H	310 m	MPC · JPL
794485	2006 UB_{26}	—	September 18, 2006	Catalina	CSS	·	1.2 km	MPC · JPL
794486	2006 UX_{30}	—	October 16, 2006	Kitt Peak	Spacewatch	EOS	1.3 km	MPC · JPL
794487	2006 UA_{40}	—	October 16, 2006	Kitt Peak	Spacewatch	·	1.4 km	MPC · JPL
794488	2006 UG_{66}	—	September 17, 2006	Kitt Peak	Spacewatch	KON	1.4 km	MPC · JPL
794489	2006 UF_{67}	—	October 15, 2001	Kitt Peak	Spacewatch	H	320 m	MPC · JPL
794490	2006 UV_{84}	—	September 27, 2006	Mount Lemmon	Mount Lemmon Survey	EUN	860 m	MPC · JPL
794491	2006 UC_{92}	—	October 3, 2006	Mount Lemmon	Mount Lemmon Survey	HNS	720 m	MPC · JPL
794492	2006 UK_{111}	—	October 19, 2006	Kitt Peak	Spacewatch	·	1.7 km	MPC · JPL
794493	2006 UT_{120}	—	October 2, 2006	Mount Lemmon	Mount Lemmon Survey	·	990 m	MPC · JPL
794494	2006 UM_{126}	—	October 19, 2006	Kitt Peak	Spacewatch	HNS	740 m	MPC · JPL
794495	2006 UV_{128}	—	October 19, 2006	Kitt Peak	Spacewatch	KOR	990 m	MPC · JPL
794496	2006 UE_{131}	—	October 19, 2006	Kitt Peak	Spacewatch	·	1.8 km	MPC · JPL
794497	2006 UE_{136}	—	September 30, 2006	Mount Lemmon	Mount Lemmon Survey	·	1.2 km	MPC · JPL
794498	2006 UT_{141}	—	October 19, 2006	Kitt Peak	Spacewatch	·	1.8 km	MPC · JPL
794499	2006 UV_{151}	—	October 20, 2006	Mount Lemmon	Mount Lemmon Survey	EOS	1.5 km	MPC · JPL
794500	2006 UF_{156}	—	September 18, 2006	Kitt Peak	Spacewatch	NYS	630 m	MPC · JPL

== 794501–794600 ==
back to top

Designation			Discovery			Properties		Ref
Permanent	Provisional	Named after	Date	Site	Discoverer(s)	Category	Diam.	Ref
794501	2006 UP_{158}	—	October 2, 2006	Mount Lemmon	Mount Lemmon Survey	EUN	1.0 km	MPC · JPL
794502	2006 UC_{161}	—	October 21, 2006	Mount Lemmon	Mount Lemmon Survey	·	1.7 km	MPC · JPL
794503	2006 UN_{167}	—	October 2, 2006	Mount Lemmon	Mount Lemmon Survey	·	570 m	MPC · JPL
794504	2006 UZ_{168}	—	October 2, 2006	Mount Lemmon	Mount Lemmon Survey	·	720 m	MPC · JPL
794505	2006 UC_{178}	—	September 29, 2006	Anderson Mesa	LONEOS	·	2.0 km	MPC · JPL
794506	2006 UC_{199}	—	October 16, 2006	Kitt Peak	Spacewatch	THM	2.1 km	MPC · JPL
794507	2006 UW_{202}	—	October 22, 2006	Mount Lemmon	Mount Lemmon Survey	H	320 m	MPC · JPL
794508	2006 UH_{242}	—	October 15, 2006	Kitt Peak	Spacewatch	·	720 m	MPC · JPL
794509	2006 UD_{244}	—	October 1, 2006	Kitt Peak	Spacewatch	·	910 m	MPC · JPL
794510	2006 UP_{244}	—	October 27, 2006	Mount Lemmon	Mount Lemmon Survey	·	920 m	MPC · JPL
794511	2006 UC_{249}	—	October 27, 2006	Mount Lemmon	Mount Lemmon Survey	·	1.8 km	MPC · JPL
794512	2006 UO_{251}	—	October 27, 2006	Mount Lemmon	Mount Lemmon Survey	·	1.9 km	MPC · JPL
794513	2006 UH_{252}	—	October 27, 2006	Mount Lemmon	Mount Lemmon Survey	·	2.3 km	MPC · JPL
794514	2006 UJ_{258}	—	October 28, 2006	Mount Lemmon	Mount Lemmon Survey	·	2.8 km	MPC · JPL
794515	2006 UC_{260}	—	September 27, 2006	Mount Lemmon	Mount Lemmon Survey	·	2.0 km	MPC · JPL
794516	2006 UB_{261}	—	September 25, 2006	Mount Lemmon	Mount Lemmon Survey	·	540 m	MPC · JPL
794517	2006 UG_{270}	—	October 27, 2006	Mount Lemmon	Mount Lemmon Survey	·	1.9 km	MPC · JPL
794518	2006 UZ_{277}	—	October 2, 2006	Mount Lemmon	Mount Lemmon Survey	·	660 m	MPC · JPL
794519	2006 UM_{283}	—	September 26, 2006	Mount Lemmon	Mount Lemmon Survey	EUN	770 m	MPC · JPL
794520	2006 UU_{288}	—	October 30, 2006	Mount Lemmon	Mount Lemmon Survey	·	1.7 km	MPC · JPL
794521	2006 UT_{289}	—	October 16, 2006	Kitt Peak	Spacewatch	·	1.1 km	MPC · JPL
794522	2006 UP_{293}	—	October 19, 2006	Kitt Peak	Deep Ecliptic Survey	·	2.3 km	MPC · JPL
794523	2006 UW_{295}	—	October 19, 2006	Kitt Peak	Deep Ecliptic Survey	·	820 m	MPC · JPL
794524	2006 UG_{296}	—	August 27, 2006	Kitt Peak	Spacewatch	·	1.3 km	MPC · JPL
794525	2006 UK_{296}	—	October 19, 2006	Kitt Peak	Deep Ecliptic Survey	·	540 m	MPC · JPL
794526	2006 UO_{299}	—	August 27, 2006	Kitt Peak	Spacewatch	·	1.2 km	MPC · JPL
794527	2006 UA_{300}	—	October 19, 2006	Kitt Peak	Deep Ecliptic Survey	·	2.0 km	MPC · JPL
794528	2006 UB_{304}	—	October 19, 2006	Kitt Peak	Deep Ecliptic Survey	T_{j} (2.98)	2.0 km	MPC · JPL
794529	2006 UR_{304}	—	August 28, 2006	Kitt Peak	Spacewatch	·	1.2 km	MPC · JPL
794530	2006 UE_{306}	—	October 19, 2006	Kitt Peak	Deep Ecliptic Survey	·	1.3 km	MPC · JPL
794531	2006 UH_{311}	—	September 26, 2006	Mount Lemmon	Mount Lemmon Survey	·	1.1 km	MPC · JPL
794532	2006 US_{313}	—	October 19, 2006	Kitt Peak	Deep Ecliptic Survey	·	920 m	MPC · JPL
794533	2006 UB_{318}	—	October 19, 2006	Kitt Peak	Deep Ecliptic Survey	·	1.3 km	MPC · JPL
794534	2006 UD_{318}	—	October 19, 2006	Kitt Peak	Deep Ecliptic Survey	·	1.8 km	MPC · JPL
794535	2006 UP_{318}	—	October 19, 2006	Kitt Peak	Deep Ecliptic Survey	·	960 m	MPC · JPL
794536	2006 UA_{320}	—	November 19, 2006	Kitt Peak	Spacewatch	HYG	1.7 km	MPC · JPL
794537	2006 UC_{339}	—	October 26, 2006	Mauna Kea	P. A. Wiegert	LIX	2.3 km	MPC · JPL
794538	2006 UG_{342}	—	October 26, 2006	Mauna Kea	P. A. Wiegert	·	760 m	MPC · JPL
794539	2006 UQ_{344}	—	October 26, 2006	Mauna Kea	P. A. Wiegert	·	1.2 km	MPC · JPL
794540	2006 US_{349}	—	October 26, 2006	Mauna Kea	P. A. Wiegert	·	1.3 km	MPC · JPL
794541	2006 UX_{352}	—	April 5, 2008	Mount Lemmon	Mount Lemmon Survey	·	980 m	MPC · JPL
794542	2006 UA_{360}	—	October 22, 2006	Kitt Peak	Spacewatch	·	1.1 km	MPC · JPL
794543	2006 UP_{364}	—	October 21, 2006	Mount Lemmon	Mount Lemmon Survey	THB	1.7 km	MPC · JPL
794544	2006 UU_{366}	—	September 27, 2006	Mount Lemmon	Mount Lemmon Survey	·	620 m	MPC · JPL
794545	2006 UU_{369}	—	October 22, 2006	Lulin	LUSS	PHO	880 m	MPC · JPL
794546	2006 UN_{371}	—	October 22, 2006	Kitt Peak	Spacewatch	·	1.7 km	MPC · JPL
794547	2006 UO_{372}	—	October 19, 2006	Mount Lemmon	Mount Lemmon Survey	·	1.7 km	MPC · JPL
794548	2006 UA_{376}	—	January 22, 2012	Haleakala	Pan-STARRS 1	·	890 m	MPC · JPL
794549	2006 UB_{376}	—	January 4, 2016	Haleakala	Pan-STARRS 1	·	870 m	MPC · JPL
794550	2006 UY_{376}	—	April 23, 2009	Mount Lemmon	Mount Lemmon Survey	·	1.3 km	MPC · JPL
794551	2006 US_{379}	—	October 20, 2006	Mount Lemmon	Mount Lemmon Survey	·	1.0 km	MPC · JPL
794552	2006 UU_{379}	—	August 24, 2011	Haleakala	Pan-STARRS 1	EOS	1.3 km	MPC · JPL
794553	2006 UG_{382}	—	October 22, 2006	Kitt Peak	Spacewatch	KON	1.4 km	MPC · JPL
794554	2006 UK_{383}	—	October 21, 2006	Kitt Peak	Spacewatch	·	2.0 km	MPC · JPL
794555	2006 UY_{383}	—	October 31, 2006	Kitt Peak	Spacewatch	·	1.8 km	MPC · JPL
794556	2006 UT_{386}	—	October 22, 2006	Kitt Peak	Spacewatch	·	930 m	MPC · JPL
794557	2006 UU_{388}	—	October 27, 2006	Mount Lemmon	Mount Lemmon Survey	HOF	1.9 km	MPC · JPL
794558	2006 UL_{392}	—	October 31, 2006	Mount Lemmon	Mount Lemmon Survey	AEO	710 m	MPC · JPL
794559	2006 UA_{394}	—	October 21, 2006	Mount Lemmon	Mount Lemmon Survey	EOS	1.2 km	MPC · JPL
794560	2006 UN_{394}	—	October 20, 2006	Mount Lemmon	Mount Lemmon Survey	HOF	1.8 km	MPC · JPL
794561	2006 UY_{394}	—	October 21, 2006	Kitt Peak	Spacewatch	·	1.8 km	MPC · JPL
794562	2006 UE_{395}	—	October 21, 2006	Kitt Peak	Spacewatch	·	1.8 km	MPC · JPL
794563	2006 UX_{395}	—	October 18, 2006	Kitt Peak	Spacewatch	·	2.2 km	MPC · JPL
794564	2006 VE_{1}	—	September 28, 2006	Mount Lemmon	Mount Lemmon Survey	·	1.7 km	MPC · JPL
794565	2006 VA_{14}	—	November 15, 2006	Socorro	LINEAR	T_{j} (2.9)	1.8 km	MPC · JPL
794566	2006 VQ_{14}	—	October 12, 2006	Kitt Peak	Spacewatch	·	720 m	MPC · JPL
794567	2006 VU_{23}	—	September 30, 2006	Mount Lemmon	Mount Lemmon Survey	·	490 m	MPC · JPL
794568	2006 VF_{25}	—	November 10, 2006	Kitt Peak	Spacewatch	EOS	1.3 km	MPC · JPL
794569	2006 VK_{33}	—	November 11, 2006	Mount Lemmon	Mount Lemmon Survey	·	900 m	MPC · JPL
794570	2006 VT_{43}	—	October 30, 2006	Catalina	CSS	·	1.1 km	MPC · JPL
794571	2006 VM_{46}	—	September 30, 2006	Mount Lemmon	Mount Lemmon Survey	·	560 m	MPC · JPL
794572	2006 VZ_{60}	—	October 27, 2006	Mount Lemmon	Mount Lemmon Survey	·	2.1 km	MPC · JPL
794573	2006 VU_{83}	—	October 21, 2006	Kitt Peak	Spacewatch	MIS	1.5 km	MPC · JPL
794574	2006 VZ_{86}	—	November 14, 2006	Mount Lemmon	Mount Lemmon Survey	·	2.2 km	MPC · JPL
794575	2006 VX_{87}	—	November 14, 2006	Mount Lemmon	Mount Lemmon Survey	·	2.1 km	MPC · JPL
794576	2006 VX_{118}	—	November 1, 2006	Mount Lemmon	Mount Lemmon Survey	·	600 m	MPC · JPL
794577	2006 VY_{118}	—	October 4, 2006	Mount Lemmon	Mount Lemmon Survey	EOS	1.4 km	MPC · JPL
794578	2006 VH_{119}	—	October 13, 2006	Kitt Peak	Spacewatch	AEO	830 m	MPC · JPL
794579	2006 VY_{120}	—	October 3, 2006	Mount Lemmon	Mount Lemmon Survey	·	1.7 km	MPC · JPL
794580	2006 VH_{122}	—	November 14, 2006	Kitt Peak	Spacewatch	·	1.4 km	MPC · JPL
794581	2006 VB_{128}	—	November 15, 2006	Kitt Peak	Spacewatch	EUN	820 m	MPC · JPL
794582	2006 VT_{128}	—	November 15, 2006	Kitt Peak	Spacewatch	·	1.5 km	MPC · JPL
794583	2006 VT_{143}	—	October 17, 2006	Mount Lemmon	Mount Lemmon Survey	THB	1.8 km	MPC · JPL
794584	2006 VE_{175}	—	November 1, 2006	Mount Lemmon	Mount Lemmon Survey	·	2.0 km	MPC · JPL
794585	2006 VO_{175}	—	November 11, 2006	Mount Lemmon	Mount Lemmon Survey	·	2.0 km	MPC · JPL
794586	2006 VC_{176}	—	November 15, 2006	Mount Lemmon	Mount Lemmon Survey	·	1.7 km	MPC · JPL
794587	2006 VC_{180}	—	September 26, 2006	Mount Lemmon	Mount Lemmon Survey	·	400 m	MPC · JPL
794588	2006 VX_{181}	—	February 2, 2016	Haleakala	Pan-STARRS 1	·	810 m	MPC · JPL
794589	2006 VR_{182}	—	November 1, 2006	Kitt Peak	Spacewatch	EUN	710 m	MPC · JPL
794590	2006 VX_{182}	—	November 14, 2006	Kitt Peak	Spacewatch	·	810 m	MPC · JPL
794591	2006 VH_{183}	—	November 15, 2006	Mount Lemmon	Mount Lemmon Survey	·	1.8 km	MPC · JPL
794592	2006 VL_{183}	—	November 11, 2006	Mount Lemmon	Mount Lemmon Survey	·	1.2 km	MPC · JPL
794593	2006 VQ_{183}	—	November 12, 2006	Mount Lemmon	Mount Lemmon Survey	·	1.0 km	MPC · JPL
794594	2006 VT_{183}	—	November 1, 2006	Kitt Peak	Spacewatch	KOR	1.1 km	MPC · JPL
794595	2006 VZ_{185}	—	November 1, 2006	Kitt Peak	Spacewatch	EOS	1.3 km	MPC · JPL
794596	2006 VC_{187}	—	November 15, 2006	Mount Lemmon	Mount Lemmon Survey	·	2.3 km	MPC · JPL
794597	2006 VL_{187}	—	November 15, 2006	Mount Lemmon	Mount Lemmon Survey	·	1.9 km	MPC · JPL
794598	2006 WU_{4}	—	October 17, 2006	Kitt Peak	Spacewatch	·	1.4 km	MPC · JPL
794599	2006 WL_{7}	—	November 16, 2006	Kitt Peak	Spacewatch	·	900 m	MPC · JPL
794600	2006 WP_{9}	—	November 16, 2006	Kitt Peak	Spacewatch	·	1.9 km	MPC · JPL

== 794601–794700 ==
back to top

Designation			Discovery			Properties		Ref
Permanent	Provisional	Named after	Date	Site	Discoverer(s)	Category	Diam.	Ref
794601	2006 WN_{12}	—	September 28, 2006	Mount Lemmon	Mount Lemmon Survey	·	500 m	MPC · JPL
794602	2006 WU_{13}	—	November 16, 2006	Mount Lemmon	Mount Lemmon Survey	·	580 m	MPC · JPL
794603	2006 WR_{27}	—	November 21, 2006	Mauna Kea	D. D. Balam, K. M. Perrett	·	2.2 km	MPC · JPL
794604	2006 WF_{38}	—	September 28, 2006	Mount Lemmon	Mount Lemmon Survey	·	1.9 km	MPC · JPL
794605	2006 WG_{51}	—	November 16, 2006	Mount Lemmon	Mount Lemmon Survey	·	1.9 km	MPC · JPL
794606	2006 WG_{65}	—	November 17, 2006	Mount Lemmon	Mount Lemmon Survey	·	800 m	MPC · JPL
794607	2006 WK_{74}	—	November 14, 2006	Kitt Peak	Spacewatch	·	870 m	MPC · JPL
794608	2006 WL_{76}	—	November 18, 2006	Kitt Peak	Spacewatch	HOF	2.1 km	MPC · JPL
794609	2006 WK_{84}	—	November 18, 2006	Mount Lemmon	Mount Lemmon Survey	EUP	2.1 km	MPC · JPL
794610	2006 WM_{92}	—	October 4, 2006	Mount Lemmon	Mount Lemmon Survey	·	2.1 km	MPC · JPL
794611	2006 WU_{96}	—	December 20, 2001	Kitt Peak	Spacewatch	THM	1.5 km	MPC · JPL
794612	2006 WU_{109}	—	February 7, 1999	Mauna Kea	C. Veillet, J. Anderson	·	890 m	MPC · JPL
794613	2006 WQ_{118}	—	November 20, 2006	Mount Lemmon	Mount Lemmon Survey	·	1.6 km	MPC · JPL
794614	2006 WS_{121}	—	November 21, 2006	Mount Lemmon	Mount Lemmon Survey	NEM	1.3 km	MPC · JPL
794615	2006 WC_{122}	—	November 2, 2006	Mount Lemmon	Mount Lemmon Survey	·	2.7 km	MPC · JPL
794616	2006 WU_{122}	—	November 21, 2006	Mount Lemmon	Mount Lemmon Survey	BAP	680 m	MPC · JPL
794617	2006 WD_{124}	—	November 22, 2006	Mount Lemmon	Mount Lemmon Survey	·	1.3 km	MPC · JPL
794618	2006 WD_{126}	—	November 22, 2006	Mount Lemmon	Mount Lemmon Survey	·	2.0 km	MPC · JPL
794619	2006 WO_{136}	—	November 11, 2006	Kitt Peak	Spacewatch	·	1.2 km	MPC · JPL
794620	2006 WS_{136}	—	November 19, 2006	Kitt Peak	Spacewatch	THM	1.7 km	MPC · JPL
794621	2006 WP_{137}	—	November 19, 2006	Kitt Peak	Spacewatch	·	1.7 km	MPC · JPL
794622	2006 WX_{145}	—	October 28, 2010	Mount Lemmon	Mount Lemmon Survey	·	1.1 km	MPC · JPL
794623	2006 WK_{154}	—	November 22, 2006	Kitt Peak	Spacewatch	·	1.2 km	MPC · JPL
794624	2006 WB_{161}	—	November 10, 2006	Kitt Peak	Spacewatch	·	850 m	MPC · JPL
794625	2006 WW_{161}	—	November 15, 2006	Kitt Peak	Spacewatch	·	1.8 km	MPC · JPL
794626	2006 WT_{162}	—	November 12, 2006	Mount Lemmon	Mount Lemmon Survey	EUN	810 m	MPC · JPL
794627	2006 WV_{169}	—	November 11, 2006	Kitt Peak	Spacewatch	·	1.1 km	MPC · JPL
794628	2006 WM_{192}	—	November 16, 2006	Kitt Peak	Spacewatch	·	1.1 km	MPC · JPL
794629	2006 WF_{199}	—	November 16, 2006	Kitt Peak	Spacewatch	EOS	1.3 km	MPC · JPL
794630	2006 WD_{202}	—	May 19, 2010	Mount Lemmon	Mount Lemmon Survey	·	2.1 km	MPC · JPL
794631	2006 WE_{214}	—	November 16, 2006	Kitt Peak	Spacewatch	·	1.6 km	MPC · JPL
794632	2006 WV_{214}	—	September 12, 2013	Catalina	CSS	·	1.1 km	MPC · JPL
794633	2006 WZ_{220}	—	May 23, 2014	Haleakala	Pan-STARRS 1	·	2.1 km	MPC · JPL
794634	2006 WT_{224}	—	February 6, 2016	Haleakala	Pan-STARRS 1	·	980 m	MPC · JPL
794635	2006 WH_{226}	—	March 29, 2012	Mount Lemmon	Mount Lemmon Survey	·	930 m	MPC · JPL
794636	2006 WZ_{226}	—	January 26, 2017	Haleakala	Pan-STARRS 1	·	1.2 km	MPC · JPL
794637	2006 WN_{228}	—	August 20, 2014	Haleakala	Pan-STARRS 1	·	980 m	MPC · JPL
794638	2006 WK_{229}	—	November 18, 2006	Mount Lemmon	Mount Lemmon Survey	·	2.0 km	MPC · JPL
794639	2006 WT_{229}	—	November 22, 2006	Mount Lemmon	Mount Lemmon Survey	·	2.7 km	MPC · JPL
794640	2006 WS_{230}	—	November 16, 2006	Mount Lemmon	Mount Lemmon Survey	·	540 m	MPC · JPL
794641	2006 WB_{231}	—	November 16, 2006	Mount Lemmon	Mount Lemmon Survey	·	650 m	MPC · JPL
794642	2006 WB_{232}	—	November 22, 2006	Kitt Peak	Spacewatch	ARM	2.6 km	MPC · JPL
794643	2006 WM_{232}	—	November 17, 2006	Mount Lemmon	Mount Lemmon Survey	EUN	910 m	MPC · JPL
794644	2006 WP_{232}	—	November 16, 2006	Kitt Peak	Spacewatch	KOR	1.1 km	MPC · JPL
794645	2006 WZ_{232}	—	November 23, 2006	Kitt Peak	Spacewatch	·	620 m	MPC · JPL
794646	2006 WM_{233}	—	August 22, 2014	Haleakala	Pan-STARRS 1	·	1.0 km	MPC · JPL
794647	2006 WN_{234}	—	November 16, 2006	Kitt Peak	Spacewatch	HNS	760 m	MPC · JPL
794648	2006 XZ_{23}	—	December 12, 2006	Mount Lemmon	Mount Lemmon Survey	·	1.2 km	MPC · JPL
794649	2006 XQ_{76}	—	December 22, 2012	Haleakala	Pan-STARRS 1	·	2.1 km	MPC · JPL
794650	2006 XQ_{78}	—	December 9, 2006	Kitt Peak	Spacewatch	·	1.2 km	MPC · JPL
794651	2006 XG_{80}	—	December 15, 2006	Kitt Peak	Spacewatch	·	970 m	MPC · JPL
794652	2006 XJ_{80}	—	December 15, 2006	Kitt Peak	Spacewatch	·	2.2 km	MPC · JPL
794653	2006 XB_{81}	—	December 14, 2006	Kitt Peak	Spacewatch	HNS	980 m	MPC · JPL
794654	2006 XM_{82}	—	December 14, 2006	Kitt Peak	Spacewatch	·	1.5 km	MPC · JPL
794655	2006 XX_{82}	—	December 12, 2006	Mount Lemmon	Mount Lemmon Survey	·	2.3 km	MPC · JPL
794656	2006 YH_{3}	—	December 16, 2006	Kitt Peak	Spacewatch	·	940 m	MPC · JPL
794657	2006 YB_{17}	—	December 21, 2006	Mount Lemmon	Mount Lemmon Survey	·	1.1 km	MPC · JPL
794658	2006 YL_{34}	—	December 21, 2006	Kitt Peak	Spacewatch	·	1.1 km	MPC · JPL
794659	2006 YT_{53}	—	December 27, 2006	Mount Lemmon	Mount Lemmon Survey	·	1.1 km	MPC · JPL
794660	2006 YY_{63}	—	December 21, 2006	Mount Lemmon	Mount Lemmon Survey	·	960 m	MPC · JPL
794661	2006 YH_{64}	—	September 8, 2016	Haleakala	Pan-STARRS 1	·	2.0 km	MPC · JPL
794662	2006 YM_{64}	—	August 30, 2016	Haleakala	Pan-STARRS 1	·	2.1 km	MPC · JPL
794663	2006 YA_{66}	—	January 18, 2013	Mount Lemmon	Mount Lemmon Survey	HYG	1.9 km	MPC · JPL
794664	2006 YA_{68}	—	December 27, 2006	Mount Lemmon	Mount Lemmon Survey	·	670 m	MPC · JPL
794665	2006 YY_{68}	—	December 21, 2006	Kitt Peak	Spacewatch	·	1.1 km	MPC · JPL
794666	2006 YN_{70}	—	December 24, 2006	Kitt Peak	Spacewatch	·	1.2 km	MPC · JPL
794667	2007 AO_{2}	—	December 25, 2006	Catalina	CSS	·	1.5 km	MPC · JPL
794668	2007 AF_{5}	—	January 8, 2007	Mount Lemmon	Mount Lemmon Survey	·	1.0 km	MPC · JPL
794669	2007 AF_{12}	—	January 13, 2007	Socorro	LINEAR	·	810 m	MPC · JPL
794670	2007 AC_{20}	—	January 10, 2007	Kitt Peak	Spacewatch	·	1.1 km	MPC · JPL
794671	2007 AD_{33}	—	January 9, 2007	Kitt Peak	Spacewatch	·	1.0 km	MPC · JPL
794672	2007 AO_{34}	—	January 15, 2007	Mauna Kea	P. A. Wiegert	·	2.1 km	MPC · JPL
794673	2007 AC_{35}	—	October 14, 2014	Mount Lemmon	Mount Lemmon Survey	·	1.1 km	MPC · JPL
794674	2007 AF_{36}	—	January 15, 2007	Mauna Kea	P. A. Wiegert	·	1.0 km	MPC · JPL
794675	2007 AH_{36}	—	January 10, 2007	Kitt Peak	Spacewatch	·	1.0 km	MPC · JPL
794676	2007 AF_{38}	—	January 9, 2007	Mount Lemmon	Mount Lemmon Survey	VER	1.9 km	MPC · JPL
794677	2007 AP_{39}	—	April 17, 2015	Mount Lemmon	Mount Lemmon Survey	·	2.0 km	MPC · JPL
794678	2007 BH	—	January 18, 2007	Palomar Mountain	NEAT	H	470 m	MPC · JPL
794679	2007 BQ_{12}	—	January 17, 2007	Kitt Peak	Spacewatch	NYS	690 m	MPC · JPL
794680	2007 BR_{26}	—	January 24, 2007	Mount Lemmon	Mount Lemmon Survey	·	510 m	MPC · JPL
794681	2007 BR_{35}	—	November 28, 2006	Mount Lemmon	Mount Lemmon Survey	·	1.0 km	MPC · JPL
794682	2007 BP_{54}	—	January 24, 2007	Kitt Peak	Spacewatch	·	1.5 km	MPC · JPL
794683	2007 BO_{64}	—	January 27, 2007	Kitt Peak	Spacewatch	·	2.0 km	MPC · JPL
794684	2007 BC_{94}	—	January 24, 2007	Mount Lemmon	Mount Lemmon Survey	(17392)	1.1 km	MPC · JPL
794685	2007 BD_{94}	—	January 19, 2007	Mauna Kea	P. A. Wiegert	·	1.2 km	MPC · JPL
794686	2007 BL_{94}	—	April 7, 2008	Kitt Peak	Spacewatch	·	2.1 km	MPC · JPL
794687	2007 BY_{103}	—	January 27, 2007	Mount Lemmon	Mount Lemmon Survey	·	1.0 km	MPC · JPL
794688	2007 BY_{112}	—	December 2, 2010	Mount Lemmon	Mount Lemmon Survey	·	1.1 km	MPC · JPL
794689	2007 BJ_{114}	—	January 17, 2007	Kitt Peak	Spacewatch	·	1.1 km	MPC · JPL
794690	2007 BM_{115}	—	January 17, 2007	Kitt Peak	Spacewatch	·	610 m	MPC · JPL
794691	2007 BJ_{116}	—	April 19, 2017	Mount Lemmon	Mount Lemmon Survey	AEO	850 m	MPC · JPL
794692	2007 BO_{117}	—	January 27, 2007	Kitt Peak	Spacewatch	·	1.1 km	MPC · JPL
794693	2007 BG_{119}	—	January 28, 2007	Mount Lemmon	Mount Lemmon Survey	·	2.2 km	MPC · JPL
794694	2007 BC_{122}	—	October 15, 2015	Mount Lemmon	Mount Lemmon Survey	·	1.4 km	MPC · JPL
794695	2007 CC_{4}	—	January 28, 2007	Kitt Peak	Spacewatch	·	2.6 km	MPC · JPL
794696	2007 CN_{18}	—	January 27, 2007	Kitt Peak	Spacewatch	·	960 m	MPC · JPL
794697	2007 CJ_{30}	—	August 14, 2004	Cerro Tololo	Deep Ecliptic Survey	·	2.1 km	MPC · JPL
794698	2007 CC_{37}	—	February 6, 2007	Mount Lemmon	Mount Lemmon Survey	THM	2.0 km	MPC · JPL
794699	2007 CU_{47}	—	January 27, 2007	Mount Lemmon	Mount Lemmon Survey	·	2.3 km	MPC · JPL
794700	2007 CX_{47}	—	January 27, 2007	Mount Lemmon	Mount Lemmon Survey	(2076)	690 m	MPC · JPL

== 794701–794800 ==
back to top

Designation			Discovery			Properties		Ref
Permanent	Provisional	Named after	Date	Site	Discoverer(s)	Category	Diam.	Ref
794701	2007 CU_{49}	—	February 10, 2007	Mount Lemmon	Mount Lemmon Survey	ADE	1.2 km	MPC · JPL
794702	2007 CB_{54}	—	February 9, 2007	Kitt Peak	Spacewatch	·	930 m	MPC · JPL
794703	2007 CE_{65}	—	February 7, 2007	Mount Lemmon	Mount Lemmon Survey	·	1.5 km	MPC · JPL
794704	2007 CQ_{73}	—	February 21, 2007	Kitt Peak	Deep Ecliptic Survey	·	960 m	MPC · JPL
794705	2007 CA_{74}	—	February 21, 2007	Kitt Peak	Deep Ecliptic Survey	·	1.9 km	MPC · JPL
794706	2007 CA_{76}	—	February 14, 2007	Mauna Kea	P. A. Wiegert	·	1.3 km	MPC · JPL
794707	2007 CZ_{78}	—	February 13, 2007	Mount Lemmon	Mount Lemmon Survey	THM	1.7 km	MPC · JPL
794708	2007 CA_{79}	—	February 13, 2007	Mount Lemmon	Mount Lemmon Survey	THM	1.6 km	MPC · JPL
794709	2007 CG_{83}	—	February 10, 2007	Mount Lemmon	Mount Lemmon Survey	·	910 m	MPC · JPL
794710	2007 CK_{83}	—	April 19, 2012	Mount Lemmon	Mount Lemmon Survey	·	1.0 km	MPC · JPL
794711	2007 CX_{83}	—	February 6, 2007	Kitt Peak	Spacewatch	·	2.1 km	MPC · JPL
794712	2007 CR_{84}	—	February 9, 2007	Kitt Peak	Spacewatch	·	2.2 km	MPC · JPL
794713	2007 CH_{85}	—	February 10, 2007	Mount Lemmon	Mount Lemmon Survey	·	870 m	MPC · JPL
794714	2007 CZ_{85}	—	February 6, 2007	Mount Lemmon	Mount Lemmon Survey	·	1.8 km	MPC · JPL
794715	2007 CK_{86}	—	February 8, 2007	Mount Lemmon	Mount Lemmon Survey	·	1.2 km	MPC · JPL
794716	2007 CB_{87}	—	February 7, 2007	Mount Lemmon	Mount Lemmon Survey	·	3.1 km	MPC · JPL
794717	2007 DY_{24}	—	January 27, 2007	Mount Lemmon	Mount Lemmon Survey	·	990 m	MPC · JPL
794718	2007 DG_{27}	—	February 17, 2007	Kitt Peak	Spacewatch	·	1.2 km	MPC · JPL
794719	2007 DD_{48}	—	September 12, 2005	Kitt Peak	Spacewatch	·	1.3 km	MPC · JPL
794720	2007 DJ_{64}	—	February 21, 2007	Kitt Peak	Spacewatch	·	1.3 km	MPC · JPL
794721	2007 DJ_{115}	—	February 17, 2007	Kitt Peak	Spacewatch	THM	2.1 km	MPC · JPL
794722	2007 DE_{125}	—	February 21, 2007	Kitt Peak	Spacewatch	·	2.0 km	MPC · JPL
794723	2007 DV_{126}	—	February 17, 2007	Mount Lemmon	Mount Lemmon Survey	EUN	860 m	MPC · JPL
794724	2007 DB_{127}	—	February 22, 2007	Kitt Peak	Spacewatch	·	1.0 km	MPC · JPL
794725	2007 DP_{127}	—	February 27, 2007	Kitt Peak	Spacewatch	·	1.1 km	MPC · JPL
794726	2007 DR_{128}	—	February 25, 2007	Kitt Peak	Spacewatch	·	680 m	MPC · JPL
794727	2007 DA_{129}	—	February 25, 2007	Mount Lemmon	Mount Lemmon Survey	·	1.1 km	MPC · JPL
794728	2007 DC_{130}	—	February 17, 2007	Mount Lemmon	Mount Lemmon Survey	HYG	2.1 km	MPC · JPL
794729	2007 DG_{130}	—	February 23, 2007	Mount Lemmon	Mount Lemmon Survey	·	1.0 km	MPC · JPL
794730	2007 EY	—	March 10, 2007	Socorro	LINEAR	AMO	390 m	MPC · JPL
794731	2007 EY_{16}	—	March 9, 2007	Kitt Peak	Spacewatch	·	720 m	MPC · JPL
794732	2007 EP_{34}	—	March 10, 2007	Palomar Mountain	NEAT	critical	1.2 km	MPC · JPL
794733	2007 EY_{39}	—	February 22, 2007	Kitt Peak	Spacewatch	·	1.0 km	MPC · JPL
794734	2007 EG_{63}	—	March 10, 2007	Kitt Peak	Spacewatch	H	370 m	MPC · JPL
794735	2007 EO_{63}	—	March 10, 2007	Mount Lemmon	Mount Lemmon Survey	·	1.3 km	MPC · JPL
794736	2007 EH_{74}	—	March 10, 2007	Kitt Peak	Spacewatch	JUN	830 m	MPC · JPL
794737	2007 EG_{77}	—	March 10, 2007	Mount Lemmon	Mount Lemmon Survey	·	780 m	MPC · JPL
794738	2007 EL_{84}	—	March 12, 2007	Mount Lemmon	Mount Lemmon Survey	·	1.7 km	MPC · JPL
794739	2007 EX_{99}	—	February 25, 2007	Mount Lemmon	Mount Lemmon Survey	·	1.3 km	MPC · JPL
794740	2007 EN_{121}	—	March 14, 2007	Mount Lemmon	Mount Lemmon Survey	·	1.2 km	MPC · JPL
794741	2007 EB_{130}	—	March 9, 2007	Mount Lemmon	Mount Lemmon Survey	·	1.9 km	MPC · JPL
794742	2007 ER_{134}	—	March 10, 2007	Kitt Peak	Spacewatch	·	1.2 km	MPC · JPL
794743	2007 EU_{136}	—	March 10, 2007	Mount Lemmon	Mount Lemmon Survey	·	1.0 km	MPC · JPL
794744	2007 EQ_{161}	—	March 15, 2007	Kitt Peak	Spacewatch	·	1.2 km	MPC · JPL
794745	2007 EX_{169}	—	January 15, 2007	Kitt Peak	Spacewatch	·	1.2 km	MPC · JPL
794746	2007 EU_{174}	—	March 14, 2007	Kitt Peak	Spacewatch	·	670 m	MPC · JPL
794747	2007 EU_{203}	—	March 10, 2007	Mount Lemmon	Mount Lemmon Survey	DOR	1.5 km	MPC · JPL
794748	2007 EY_{203}	—	March 10, 2007	Mount Lemmon	Mount Lemmon Survey	TIR	2.1 km	MPC · JPL
794749	2007 EA_{206}	—	March 12, 2007	Kitt Peak	Spacewatch	·	940 m	MPC · JPL
794750	2007 EA_{223}	—	March 10, 2007	Palomar Mountain	NEAT	·	1.3 km	MPC · JPL
794751	2007 EL_{230}	—	January 29, 2011	Mount Lemmon	Mount Lemmon Survey	·	1.1 km	MPC · JPL
794752	2007 EH_{236}	—	October 24, 2009	Kitt Peak	Spacewatch	·	730 m	MPC · JPL
794753	2007 EH_{237}	—	January 16, 2016	Haleakala	Pan-STARRS 1	·	1.6 km	MPC · JPL
794754	2007 EK_{237}	—	February 5, 2016	Haleakala	Pan-STARRS 1	·	1.1 km	MPC · JPL
794755	2007 EL_{237}	—	October 25, 2014	Mount Lemmon	Mount Lemmon Survey	·	1.1 km	MPC · JPL
794756	2007 EV_{237}	—	August 28, 2013	Mount Lemmon	Mount Lemmon Survey	·	1.1 km	MPC · JPL
794757	2007 EU_{238}	—	March 9, 2007	Mount Lemmon	Mount Lemmon Survey	·	1.2 km	MPC · JPL
794758	2007 EG_{240}	—	March 11, 2007	Mount Lemmon	Mount Lemmon Survey	EOS	1.3 km	MPC · JPL
794759	2007 ES_{241}	—	March 11, 2007	Mount Lemmon	Mount Lemmon Survey	EOS	1.4 km	MPC · JPL
794760	2007 EE_{244}	—	March 13, 2007	Mount Lemmon	Mount Lemmon Survey	·	1.8 km	MPC · JPL
794761	2007 FT_{9}	—	March 16, 2007	Kitt Peak	Spacewatch	·	930 m	MPC · JPL
794762	2007 FM_{20}	—	March 9, 2007	Kitt Peak	Spacewatch	critical	1.1 km	MPC · JPL
794763	2007 FA_{55}	—	November 1, 2005	Anderson Mesa	LONEOS	THB	2.0 km	MPC · JPL
794764	2007 FL_{55}	—	March 16, 2007	Mount Lemmon	Mount Lemmon Survey	·	1.0 km	MPC · JPL
794765	2007 FD_{58}	—	September 9, 2015	Haleakala	Pan-STARRS 1	·	2.0 km	MPC · JPL
794766	2007 FZ_{58}	—	March 19, 2017	Haleakala	Pan-STARRS 1	KOR	1.0 km	MPC · JPL
794767	2007 FB_{59}	—	March 16, 2007	Mount Lemmon	Mount Lemmon Survey	·	1.1 km	MPC · JPL
794768	2007 FS_{59}	—	March 16, 2007	Kitt Peak	Spacewatch	·	1.5 km	MPC · JPL
794769	2007 FT_{62}	—	March 20, 2007	Mount Lemmon	Mount Lemmon Survey	ADE	1.5 km	MPC · JPL
794770	2007 FC_{64}	—	March 26, 2007	Mount Lemmon	Mount Lemmon Survey	·	1.2 km	MPC · JPL
794771	2007 FC_{65}	—	March 20, 2007	Kitt Peak	Spacewatch	·	1.2 km	MPC · JPL
794772	2007 GU_{5}	—	April 14, 2007	Mount Lemmon	Mount Lemmon Survey	·	540 m	MPC · JPL
794773	2007 GV_{26}	—	April 14, 2007	Mount Lemmon	Mount Lemmon Survey	·	1.6 km	MPC · JPL
794774	2007 GL_{45}	—	April 14, 2007	Kitt Peak	Spacewatch	·	1.2 km	MPC · JPL
794775	2007 GR_{51}	—	March 31, 2007	Palomar Mountain	NEAT	·	1.2 km	MPC · JPL
794776	2007 GK_{54}	—	March 15, 2007	Mount Lemmon	Mount Lemmon Survey	·	1.0 km	MPC · JPL
794777	2007 GN_{55}	—	April 15, 2007	Kitt Peak	Spacewatch	·	1.3 km	MPC · JPL
794778	2007 GP_{55}	—	March 26, 2007	Kitt Peak	Spacewatch	CLO	1.5 km	MPC · JPL
794779	2007 GS_{55}	—	April 15, 2007	Kitt Peak	Spacewatch	·	1.1 km	MPC · JPL
794780	2007 GG_{65}	—	April 15, 2007	Kitt Peak	Spacewatch	·	2.1 km	MPC · JPL
794781	2007 GS_{70}	—	April 15, 2007	Mount Lemmon	Mount Lemmon Survey	·	1.2 km	MPC · JPL
794782	2007 GQ_{80}	—	March 5, 2016	Haleakala	Pan-STARRS 1	·	1.1 km	MPC · JPL
794783	2007 HW_{13}	—	February 25, 2007	Mount Lemmon	Mount Lemmon Survey	·	1.2 km	MPC · JPL
794784	2007 HR_{36}	—	April 19, 2007	Kitt Peak	Spacewatch	GEF	910 m	MPC · JPL
794785	2007 HT_{39}	—	April 20, 2007	Mount Lemmon	Mount Lemmon Survey	·	1.3 km	MPC · JPL
794786	2007 HT_{40}	—	June 8, 2003	Kitt Peak	Spacewatch	·	1.5 km	MPC · JPL
794787	2007 HY_{65}	—	April 22, 2007	Mount Lemmon	Mount Lemmon Survey	EUN	910 m	MPC · JPL
794788	2007 HR_{68}	—	April 23, 2007	Mount Lemmon	Mount Lemmon Survey	·	1.1 km	MPC · JPL
794789	2007 HW_{78}	—	April 23, 2007	Mount Lemmon	Mount Lemmon Survey	·	1.1 km	MPC · JPL
794790	2007 HK_{92}	—	April 21, 2007	Cerro Tololo	Deep Ecliptic Survey	·	880 m	MPC · JPL
794791	2007 HQ_{99}	—	October 25, 2016	Haleakala	Pan-STARRS 1	·	2.2 km	MPC · JPL
794792	2007 HD_{102}	—	April 9, 2016	Haleakala	Pan-STARRS 1	·	1.9 km	MPC · JPL
794793	2007 HE_{103}	—	April 20, 2007	Kitt Peak	Spacewatch	·	1.3 km	MPC · JPL
794794	2007 HJ_{103}	—	April 26, 2007	Mount Lemmon	Mount Lemmon Survey	·	1.5 km	MPC · JPL
794795	2007 HK_{103}	—	December 26, 2014	Haleakala	Pan-STARRS 1	·	1.6 km	MPC · JPL
794796	2007 HN_{103}	—	July 28, 2012	Haleakala	Pan-STARRS 1	·	1.5 km	MPC · JPL
794797	2007 HA_{106}	—	April 23, 2007	Mount Lemmon	Mount Lemmon Survey	·	1.9 km	MPC · JPL
794798	2007 HT_{106}	—	November 1, 2015	Kitt Peak	Spacewatch	·	930 m	MPC · JPL
794799	2007 HP_{107}	—	April 20, 2007	Kitt Peak	Spacewatch	·	930 m	MPC · JPL
794800	2007 HW_{107}	—	January 27, 2017	Haleakala	Pan-STARRS 1	EOS	1.5 km	MPC · JPL

== 794801–794900 ==
back to top

Designation			Discovery			Properties		Ref
Permanent	Provisional	Named after	Date	Site	Discoverer(s)	Category	Diam.	Ref
794801	2007 HQ_{108}	—	March 10, 2016	Haleakala	Pan-STARRS 1	AEO	790 m	MPC · JPL
794802	2007 HC_{110}	—	April 24, 2007	Mount Lemmon	Mount Lemmon Survey	·	1.1 km	MPC · JPL
794803	2007 HX_{110}	—	April 19, 2007	Mount Lemmon	Mount Lemmon Survey	·	1.2 km	MPC · JPL
794804	2007 HG_{113}	—	April 16, 2007	Mount Lemmon	Mount Lemmon Survey	EOS	1.5 km	MPC · JPL
794805	2007 HV_{113}	—	April 25, 2007	Mount Lemmon	Mount Lemmon Survey	·	1.4 km	MPC · JPL
794806	2007 HX_{113}	—	April 20, 2007	Kitt Peak	Spacewatch	·	1.4 km	MPC · JPL
794807	2007 HM_{114}	—	April 20, 2007	Kitt Peak	Spacewatch	·	1.6 km	MPC · JPL
794808	2007 HY_{114}	—	June 1, 2003	Cerro Tololo	Deep Ecliptic Survey	·	1.0 km	MPC · JPL
794809	2007 HC_{115}	—	April 22, 2007	Kitt Peak	Spacewatch	·	1.2 km	MPC · JPL
794810	2007 HG_{115}	—	April 22, 2007	Kitt Peak	Spacewatch	THM	1.6 km	MPC · JPL
794811	2007 JQ_{1}	—	March 15, 2007	Mount Lemmon	Mount Lemmon Survey	·	1.7 km	MPC · JPL
794812	2007 JP_{19}	—	May 10, 2007	Mount Lemmon	Mount Lemmon Survey	·	890 m	MPC · JPL
794813	2007 JK_{29}	—	May 7, 2007	Lulin	LUSS	·	1.2 km	MPC · JPL
794814	2007 JR_{43}	—	May 13, 2007	Mount Lemmon	Mount Lemmon Survey	·	1.5 km	MPC · JPL
794815	2007 JQ_{46}	—	May 10, 2007	Kitt Peak	Spacewatch	·	1.0 km	MPC · JPL
794816	2007 JD_{48}	—	April 5, 2016	Haleakala	Pan-STARRS 1	AEO	770 m	MPC · JPL
794817	2007 JQ_{48}	—	May 12, 2007	Mount Lemmon	Mount Lemmon Survey	·	1.0 km	MPC · JPL
794818	2007 JG_{51}	—	April 18, 2012	Mount Lemmon	Mount Lemmon Survey	·	1.6 km	MPC · JPL
794819	2007 JK_{52}	—	May 12, 2007	Lulin	LUSS	·	1.6 km	MPC · JPL
794820	2007 KH_{7}	—	May 26, 2007	Siding Spring	SSS	·	2.1 km	MPC · JPL
794821	2007 KC_{11}	—	May 13, 2015	Mount Lemmon	Mount Lemmon Survey	·	700 m	MPC · JPL
794822	2007 KP_{11}	—	May 26, 2007	Mount Lemmon	Mount Lemmon Survey	·	1.3 km	MPC · JPL
794823	2007 KF_{12}	—	May 16, 2007	Mount Lemmon	Mount Lemmon Survey	·	910 m	MPC · JPL
794824	2007 LJ_{1}	—	May 26, 2007	Mount Lemmon	Mount Lemmon Survey	·	1.0 km	MPC · JPL
794825	2007 LE_{4}	—	June 8, 2007	Kitt Peak	Spacewatch	·	1.0 km	MPC · JPL
794826	2007 LO_{5}	—	April 15, 2007	Mount Lemmon	Mount Lemmon Survey	·	1.2 km	MPC · JPL
794827	2007 LC_{30}	—	June 11, 2007	Mauna Kea	D. D. Balam, K. M. Perrett	·	1.5 km	MPC · JPL
794828	2007 LB_{39}	—	February 11, 2014	Mount Lemmon	Mount Lemmon Survey	·	1.0 km	MPC · JPL
794829	2007 MX_{26}	—	April 23, 2007	Mount Lemmon	Mount Lemmon Survey	·	1.3 km	MPC · JPL
794830	2007 ML_{30}	—	June 22, 2007	Kitt Peak	Spacewatch	615	1.1 km	MPC · JPL
794831	2007 PC_{1}	—	August 4, 2007	Bergisch Gladbach	W. Bickel	H	480 m	MPC · JPL
794832	2007 PZ_{48}	—	August 9, 2007	Kitt Peak	Spacewatch	·	920 m	MPC · JPL
794833	2007 PW_{55}	—	August 10, 2007	Kitt Peak	Spacewatch	KOR	1.1 km	MPC · JPL
794834	2007 PX_{55}	—	August 10, 2007	Kitt Peak	Spacewatch	KOR	980 m	MPC · JPL
794835	2007 QW	—	August 22, 2003	Palomar Mountain	NEAT	·	890 m	MPC · JPL
794836	2007 QB_{20}	—	August 21, 2007	Anderson Mesa	LONEOS	·	500 m	MPC · JPL
794837	2007 RA_{57}	—	September 9, 2007	Kitt Peak	Spacewatch	·	2.0 km	MPC · JPL
794838	2007 RK_{60}	—	September 10, 2007	Kitt Peak	Spacewatch	H	420 m	MPC · JPL
794839	2007 RH_{63}	—	September 21, 2003	Kitt Peak	Spacewatch	·	1.0 km	MPC · JPL
794840	2007 RD_{64}	—	September 10, 2007	Mount Lemmon	Mount Lemmon Survey	·	610 m	MPC · JPL
794841	2007 RV_{104}	—	August 24, 2007	Kitt Peak	Spacewatch	·	1.4 km	MPC · JPL
794842	2007 RM_{116}	—	September 11, 2007	Kitt Peak	Spacewatch	·	1.2 km	MPC · JPL
794843	2007 RD_{126}	—	September 3, 2007	Catalina	CSS	H	500 m	MPC · JPL
794844	2007 RL_{145}	—	September 5, 2007	Catalina	CSS	·	1.1 km	MPC · JPL
794845	2007 RS_{152}	—	August 24, 2007	Kitt Peak	Spacewatch	·	1.4 km	MPC · JPL
794846	2007 RY_{155}	—	September 10, 2007	Mount Lemmon	Mount Lemmon Survey	·	670 m	MPC · JPL
794847	2007 RN_{159}	—	September 12, 2007	Mount Lemmon	Mount Lemmon Survey	·	1.2 km	MPC · JPL
794848	2007 RT_{159}	—	September 12, 2007	Mount Lemmon	Mount Lemmon Survey	PHO	660 m	MPC · JPL
794849	2007 RG_{161}	—	September 13, 2007	Mount Lemmon	Mount Lemmon Survey	·	970 m	MPC · JPL
794850	2007 RF_{168}	—	September 10, 2007	Kitt Peak	Spacewatch	MAR	730 m	MPC · JPL
794851	2007 RG_{178}	—	September 10, 2007	Kitt Peak	Spacewatch	3:2	4.2 km	MPC · JPL
794852	2007 RE_{182}	—	November 18, 2003	Kitt Peak	Spacewatch	·	1.1 km	MPC · JPL
794853	2007 RL_{183}	—	September 12, 2007	Mount Lemmon	Mount Lemmon Survey	·	1.9 km	MPC · JPL
794854	2007 RG_{204}	—	September 9, 2007	Kitt Peak	Spacewatch	·	900 m	MPC · JPL
794855	2007 RO_{209}	—	August 10, 2007	Kitt Peak	Spacewatch	·	990 m	MPC · JPL
794856	2007 RJ_{219}	—	September 14, 2007	Mount Lemmon	Mount Lemmon Survey	·	690 m	MPC · JPL
794857	2007 RE_{221}	—	September 14, 2007	Mount Lemmon	Mount Lemmon Survey	·	1.4 km	MPC · JPL
794858	2007 RA_{230}	—	September 10, 2007	Kitt Peak	Spacewatch	·	2.6 km	MPC · JPL
794859	2007 RE_{247}	—	October 25, 2003	Kitt Peak	Spacewatch	·	850 m	MPC · JPL
794860	2007 RD_{248}	—	September 13, 2007	Mount Lemmon	Mount Lemmon Survey	·	1.1 km	MPC · JPL
794861	2007 RT_{255}	—	September 10, 2007	Kitt Peak	Spacewatch	·	1.8 km	MPC · JPL
794862	2007 RU_{256}	—	September 14, 2007	Kitt Peak	Spacewatch	·	820 m	MPC · JPL
794863	2007 RA_{292}	—	September 12, 2007	Mount Lemmon	Mount Lemmon Survey	NYS	960 m	MPC · JPL
794864	2007 RE_{300}	—	February 16, 2015	Haleakala	Pan-STARRS 1	·	1.7 km	MPC · JPL
794865	2007 RU_{300}	—	September 12, 2007	Mount Lemmon	Mount Lemmon Survey	·	1.2 km	MPC · JPL
794866	2007 RZ_{307}	—	September 9, 2007	Mount Lemmon	Mount Lemmon Survey	·	910 m	MPC · JPL
794867	2007 RD_{308}	—	September 9, 2007	Kitt Peak	Spacewatch	·	1.2 km	MPC · JPL
794868	2007 RJ_{308}	—	September 11, 2007	Mount Lemmon	Mount Lemmon Survey	·	1.3 km	MPC · JPL
794869	2007 RT_{331}	—	September 13, 2007	Mount Lemmon	Mount Lemmon Survey	·	1.4 km	MPC · JPL
794870	2007 RW_{339}	—	June 20, 2013	Haleakala	Pan-STARRS 1	·	660 m	MPC · JPL
794871	2007 RG_{340}	—	September 13, 2007	Mount Lemmon	Mount Lemmon Survey	·	580 m	MPC · JPL
794872	2007 RW_{342}	—	September 9, 2007	Mount Lemmon	Mount Lemmon Survey	EUN	770 m	MPC · JPL
794873	2007 RV_{344}	—	September 12, 2007	Mount Lemmon	Mount Lemmon Survey	·	1.3 km	MPC · JPL
794874	2007 RL_{345}	—	September 10, 2007	Mount Lemmon	Mount Lemmon Survey	·	2.5 km	MPC · JPL
794875	2007 RR_{347}	—	September 14, 2007	Mount Lemmon	Mount Lemmon Survey	·	1.2 km	MPC · JPL
794876	2007 RA_{348}	—	March 20, 2014	Mount Lemmon	Mount Lemmon Survey	·	1.3 km	MPC · JPL
794877	2007 RJ_{348}	—	September 17, 2017	Haleakala	Pan-STARRS 1	KOR	1.1 km	MPC · JPL
794878	2007 RL_{348}	—	September 12, 2007	Mount Lemmon	Mount Lemmon Survey	·	1.1 km	MPC · JPL
794879	2007 RJ_{349}	—	October 20, 1995	Kitt Peak	Spacewatch	·	600 m	MPC · JPL
794880	2007 RX_{351}	—	November 9, 2013	Haleakala	Pan-STARRS 1	·	1.8 km	MPC · JPL
794881	2007 RJ_{352}	—	September 12, 2018	Mount Lemmon	Mount Lemmon Survey	·	1.9 km	MPC · JPL
794882	2007 RE_{356}	—	September 14, 2007	Mount Lemmon	Mount Lemmon Survey	KOR	1 km	MPC · JPL
794883	2007 RF_{356}	—	September 14, 2007	Mount Lemmon	Mount Lemmon Survey	·	1.3 km	MPC · JPL
794884	2007 RQ_{356}	—	September 13, 2007	Mount Lemmon	Mount Lemmon Survey	·	1.6 km	MPC · JPL
794885	2007 RV_{359}	—	September 11, 2007	Kitt Peak	Spacewatch	·	1.4 km	MPC · JPL
794886	2007 RW_{362}	—	September 12, 2007	Mount Lemmon	Mount Lemmon Survey	·	950 m	MPC · JPL
794887	2007 RT_{363}	—	September 11, 2007	Mount Lemmon	Mount Lemmon Survey	VER	1.6 km	MPC · JPL
794888	2007 RO_{364}	—	September 13, 2007	Mount Lemmon	Mount Lemmon Survey	·	1.0 km	MPC · JPL
794889	2007 RG_{365}	—	September 11, 2007	Mount Lemmon	Mount Lemmon Survey	·	950 m	MPC · JPL
794890	2007 RM_{371}	—	September 12, 2007	Mount Lemmon	Mount Lemmon Survey	·	1.3 km	MPC · JPL
794891	2007 RL_{372}	—	September 12, 2007	Kitt Peak	Spacewatch	·	670 m	MPC · JPL
794892	2007 RP_{372}	—	September 13, 2007	Mount Lemmon	Mount Lemmon Survey	KOR	980 m	MPC · JPL
794893	2007 RO_{373}	—	September 15, 2007	Kitt Peak	Spacewatch	TIN	520 m	MPC · JPL
794894	2007 RM_{375}	—	September 12, 2007	Mount Lemmon	Mount Lemmon Survey	HOF	1.6 km	MPC · JPL
794895	2007 RT_{376}	—	September 15, 2007	Mount Lemmon	Mount Lemmon Survey	·	1.3 km	MPC · JPL
794896	2007 RG_{377}	—	September 15, 2007	Kitt Peak	Spacewatch	·	460 m	MPC · JPL
794897	2007 RE_{379}	—	September 14, 2007	Mount Lemmon	Mount Lemmon Survey	·	2.2 km	MPC · JPL
794898	2007 RT_{379}	—	September 11, 2007	Mount Lemmon	Mount Lemmon Survey	·	1.6 km	MPC · JPL
794899	2007 RN_{380}	—	September 13, 2007	Mount Lemmon	Mount Lemmon Survey	KOR	920 m	MPC · JPL
794900	2007 RA_{381}	—	September 12, 2007	Kitt Peak	Spacewatch	·	1.4 km	MPC · JPL

== 794901–795000 ==
back to top

Designation			Discovery			Properties		Ref
Permanent	Provisional	Named after	Date	Site	Discoverer(s)	Category	Diam.	Ref
794901	2007 RG_{381}	—	September 11, 2007	Mount Lemmon	Mount Lemmon Survey	·	710 m	MPC · JPL
794902	2007 RX_{381}	—	September 12, 2007	Mount Lemmon	Mount Lemmon Survey	·	1.9 km	MPC · JPL
794903	2007 RQ_{382}	—	September 14, 2007	Mount Lemmon	Mount Lemmon Survey	·	1.4 km	MPC · JPL
794904	2007 SQ_{6}	—	September 22, 2007	Socorro	LINEAR	APO	120 m	MPC · JPL
794905	2007 SE_{8}	—	September 18, 2007	Kitt Peak	Spacewatch	·	1.8 km	MPC · JPL
794906	2007 SE_{23}	—	September 25, 2007	Mount Lemmon	Mount Lemmon Survey	·	1.2 km	MPC · JPL
794907	2007 SH_{27}	—	January 7, 2017	Mount Lemmon	Mount Lemmon Survey	·	710 m	MPC · JPL
794908	2007 SR_{29}	—	September 24, 2007	Kitt Peak	Spacewatch	·	1.5 km	MPC · JPL
794909	2007 SO_{30}	—	September 20, 2007	Dauban	C. Rinner, F. Kugel	·	1.6 km	MPC · JPL
794910	2007 TA_{24}	—	October 10, 2007	Kitt Peak	Spacewatch	·	790 m	MPC · JPL
794911	2007 TN_{44}	—	September 14, 2007	Mount Lemmon	Mount Lemmon Survey	·	920 m	MPC · JPL
794912	2007 TU_{53}	—	September 15, 2007	Mount Lemmon	Mount Lemmon Survey	·	530 m	MPC · JPL
794913	2007 TN_{72}	—	October 7, 2007	Mount Lemmon	Mount Lemmon Survey	·	490 m	MPC · JPL
794914	2007 TP_{75}	—	September 11, 2007	Catalina	CSS	·	1.0 km	MPC · JPL
794915	2007 TU_{75}	—	September 12, 2007	Mount Lemmon	Mount Lemmon Survey	·	1.0 km	MPC · JPL
794916	2007 TT_{86}	—	October 8, 2007	Mount Lemmon	Mount Lemmon Survey	·	1.6 km	MPC · JPL
794917	2007 TO_{88}	—	October 8, 2007	Kitt Peak	Spacewatch	·	1.1 km	MPC · JPL
794918	2007 TY_{97}	—	October 8, 2007	Mount Lemmon	Mount Lemmon Survey	·	520 m	MPC · JPL
794919	2007 TJ_{118}	—	October 9, 2007	Mount Lemmon	Mount Lemmon Survey	·	680 m	MPC · JPL
794920	2007 TU_{118}	—	October 9, 2007	Mount Lemmon	Mount Lemmon Survey	critical	850 m	MPC · JPL
794921	2007 TD_{142}	—	October 9, 2007	Mount Lemmon	Mount Lemmon Survey	EOS	1.3 km	MPC · JPL
794922	2007 TC_{159}	—	October 11, 2007	Kitt Peak	Spacewatch	·	970 m	MPC · JPL
794923	2007 TM_{166}	—	October 11, 2007	Mauna Kea	D. D. Balam, K. M. Perrett	·	2.0 km	MPC · JPL
794924	2007 TU_{173}	—	October 4, 2007	Kitt Peak	Spacewatch	·	760 m	MPC · JPL
794925	2007 TH_{184}	—	October 10, 2007	Mount Lemmon	Mount Lemmon Survey	·	1.3 km	MPC · JPL
794926	2007 TZ_{185}	—	October 8, 2007	Anderson Mesa	LONEOS	·	620 m	MPC · JPL
794927	2007 TM_{202}	—	October 8, 2007	Mount Lemmon	Mount Lemmon Survey	·	440 m	MPC · JPL
794928	2007 TG_{203}	—	October 8, 2007	Mount Lemmon	Mount Lemmon Survey	·	1.9 km	MPC · JPL
794929	2007 TL_{208}	—	October 10, 2007	Mount Lemmon	Mount Lemmon Survey	·	1.4 km	MPC · JPL
794930	2007 TX_{211}	—	October 7, 2007	Kitt Peak	Spacewatch	·	810 m	MPC · JPL
794931	2007 TD_{235}	—	October 9, 2007	Kitt Peak	Spacewatch	·	750 m	MPC · JPL
794932	2007 TE_{238}	—	October 10, 2007	Kitt Peak	Spacewatch	H	430 m	MPC · JPL
794933	2007 TX_{254}	—	September 14, 2007	Mount Lemmon	Mount Lemmon Survey	EOS	1.3 km	MPC · JPL
794934	2007 TG_{280}	—	October 4, 2007	Mount Lemmon	Mount Lemmon Survey	·	710 m	MPC · JPL
794935	2007 TF_{287}	—	September 14, 2007	Catalina	CSS	·	1.6 km	MPC · JPL
794936	2007 TM_{288}	—	September 12, 2007	Mount Lemmon	Mount Lemmon Survey	·	1.1 km	MPC · JPL
794937	2007 TL_{293}	—	October 9, 2007	Mount Lemmon	Mount Lemmon Survey	·	1.6 km	MPC · JPL
794938	2007 TR_{297}	—	October 11, 2007	Mount Lemmon	Mount Lemmon Survey	·	990 m	MPC · JPL
794939	2007 TO_{304}	—	October 12, 2007	Mount Lemmon	Mount Lemmon Survey	·	690 m	MPC · JPL
794940	2007 TW_{306}	—	October 8, 2007	Mount Lemmon	Mount Lemmon Survey	HNS	840 m	MPC · JPL
794941	2007 TD_{312}	—	October 11, 2007	Mount Lemmon	Mount Lemmon Survey	·	1.1 km	MPC · JPL
794942	2007 TM_{318}	—	October 12, 2007	Kitt Peak	Spacewatch	EOS	1.4 km	MPC · JPL
794943	2007 TS_{325}	—	October 11, 2007	Kitt Peak	Spacewatch	·	1.5 km	MPC · JPL
794944	2007 TJ_{345}	—	September 13, 2007	Mount Lemmon	Mount Lemmon Survey	·	1.4 km	MPC · JPL
794945	2007 TS_{359}	—	October 15, 2007	Mount Lemmon	Mount Lemmon Survey	·	1.5 km	MPC · JPL
794946	2007 TT_{364}	—	October 15, 2007	Mount Lemmon	Mount Lemmon Survey	H	480 m	MPC · JPL
794947	2007 TB_{389}	—	September 13, 2007	Mount Lemmon	Mount Lemmon Survey	·	2.1 km	MPC · JPL
794948	2007 TJ_{406}	—	October 15, 2007	Mount Lemmon	Mount Lemmon Survey	·	440 m	MPC · JPL
794949	2007 TL_{414}	—	October 8, 2007	Anderson Mesa	LONEOS	·	2.1 km	MPC · JPL
794950	2007 TB_{417}	—	September 14, 2007	Mount Lemmon	Mount Lemmon Survey	·	1.3 km	MPC · JPL
794951	2007 TO_{424}	—	October 8, 2007	Kitt Peak	Spacewatch	·	1.1 km	MPC · JPL
794952	2007 TS_{428}	—	October 11, 2007	Kitt Peak	Spacewatch	·	730 m	MPC · JPL
794953	2007 TC_{440}	—	September 11, 2007	Kitt Peak	Spacewatch	·	1.1 km	MPC · JPL
794954	2007 TZ_{458}	—	October 14, 2007	Mount Lemmon	Mount Lemmon Survey	·	1.4 km	MPC · JPL
794955	2007 TU_{462}	—	October 12, 2007	Kitt Peak	Spacewatch	·	1.6 km	MPC · JPL
794956	2007 TH_{463}	—	January 22, 2015	Haleakala	Pan-STARRS 1	TEL	1.1 km	MPC · JPL
794957	2007 TY_{466}	—	September 4, 2011	Haleakala	Pan-STARRS 1	EUN	710 m	MPC · JPL
794958	2007 TZ_{466}	—	October 12, 2007	Mount Lemmon	Mount Lemmon Survey	·	560 m	MPC · JPL
794959	2007 TW_{467}	—	January 17, 2009	Kitt Peak	Spacewatch	·	1.2 km	MPC · JPL
794960	2007 TF_{468}	—	October 10, 2007	Catalina	CSS	(5)	830 m	MPC · JPL
794961	2007 TA_{472}	—	October 12, 2007	Kitt Peak	Spacewatch	KOR	950 m	MPC · JPL
794962	2007 TS_{473}	—	October 11, 2007	Kitt Peak	Spacewatch	·	1.7 km	MPC · JPL
794963	2007 TZ_{475}	—	January 16, 2018	Haleakala	Pan-STARRS 1	(11882)	1.1 km	MPC · JPL
794964	2007 TB_{478}	—	September 30, 2017	Haleakala	Pan-STARRS 1	·	1.3 km	MPC · JPL
794965	2007 TL_{482}	—	October 9, 2007	Kitt Peak	Spacewatch	·	1.5 km	MPC · JPL
794966	2007 TM_{482}	—	October 7, 2007	Altschwendt	W. Ries	·	1.2 km	MPC · JPL
794967	2007 TE_{485}	—	October 12, 2007	Mount Lemmon	Mount Lemmon Survey	·	1.3 km	MPC · JPL
794968	2007 TS_{485}	—	October 14, 2007	Mount Lemmon	Mount Lemmon Survey	EOS	1.3 km	MPC · JPL
794969	2007 TV_{485}	—	October 11, 2007	Mount Lemmon	Mount Lemmon Survey	EOS	1.4 km	MPC · JPL
794970	2007 TJ_{486}	—	October 7, 2007	Mount Lemmon	Mount Lemmon Survey	·	1.3 km	MPC · JPL
794971	2007 TS_{487}	—	October 8, 2007	Mount Lemmon	Mount Lemmon Survey	KOR	850 m	MPC · JPL
794972	2007 TT_{488}	—	October 8, 2007	Mount Lemmon	Mount Lemmon Survey	·	1.6 km	MPC · JPL
794973	2007 TA_{489}	—	October 12, 2007	Mount Lemmon	Mount Lemmon Survey	HOF	1.9 km	MPC · JPL
794974	2007 TS_{489}	—	October 11, 2007	Kitt Peak	Spacewatch	WIT	730 m	MPC · JPL
794975	2007 TH_{490}	—	October 15, 2007	Kitt Peak	Spacewatch	·	860 m	MPC · JPL
794976	2007 TV_{492}	—	October 10, 2007	Mount Lemmon	Mount Lemmon Survey	·	1.9 km	MPC · JPL
794977	2007 TF_{494}	—	October 9, 2007	Mount Lemmon	Mount Lemmon Survey	·	1.7 km	MPC · JPL
794978	2007 TY_{496}	—	October 12, 2007	Mount Lemmon	Mount Lemmon Survey	·	1.6 km	MPC · JPL
794979	2007 TJ_{500}	—	October 15, 2007	Mount Lemmon	Mount Lemmon Survey	·	1.2 km	MPC · JPL
794980	2007 TB_{501}	—	October 11, 2007	Kitt Peak	Spacewatch	·	1.5 km	MPC · JPL
794981	2007 TB_{502}	—	October 10, 2007	Mount Lemmon	Mount Lemmon Survey	·	1.4 km	MPC · JPL
794982	2007 TT_{503}	—	October 11, 2007	Mount Lemmon	Mount Lemmon Survey	·	1.2 km	MPC · JPL
794983	2007 TY_{504}	—	October 12, 2007	Kitt Peak	Spacewatch	·	1.6 km	MPC · JPL
794984	2007 TG_{506}	—	October 15, 2007	Kitt Peak	Spacewatch	·	2.0 km	MPC · JPL
794985	2007 TC_{507}	—	October 9, 2007	Mount Lemmon	Mount Lemmon Survey	·	1.2 km	MPC · JPL
794986	2007 TH_{507}	—	October 10, 2007	Kitt Peak	Spacewatch	(5)	760 m	MPC · JPL
794987	2007 TT_{512}	—	October 10, 2007	Mount Lemmon	Mount Lemmon Survey	·	920 m	MPC · JPL
794988	2007 UH_{7}	—	October 16, 2007	Catalina	CSS	·	1.9 km	MPC · JPL
794989	2007 UM_{22}	—	October 12, 2007	Kitt Peak	Spacewatch	·	1.9 km	MPC · JPL
794990	2007 UW_{32}	—	October 19, 2007	Kitt Peak	Spacewatch	·	1.8 km	MPC · JPL
794991	2007 UN_{55}	—	October 30, 2007	Kitt Peak	Spacewatch	·	1.2 km	MPC · JPL
794992	2007 UV_{74}	—	October 31, 2007	Mount Lemmon	Mount Lemmon Survey	·	1.4 km	MPC · JPL
794993	2007 UQ_{77}	—	October 30, 2007	Kitt Peak	Spacewatch	·	660 m	MPC · JPL
794994	2007 UC_{80}	—	October 31, 2007	Mount Lemmon	Mount Lemmon Survey	·	1.3 km	MPC · JPL
794995	2007 UO_{86}	—	October 30, 2007	Kitt Peak	Spacewatch	·	2.2 km	MPC · JPL
794996	2007 UD_{91}	—	October 10, 2007	Kitt Peak	Spacewatch	critical	710 m	MPC · JPL
794997	2007 UQ_{92}	—	October 31, 2007	Mount Lemmon	Mount Lemmon Survey	WIT	780 m	MPC · JPL
794998	2007 UU_{94}	—	October 19, 2007	Kitt Peak	Spacewatch	MIS	1.5 km	MPC · JPL
794999	2007 UW_{95}	—	October 19, 2007	Goodricke-Pigott	R. A. Tucker	H	360 m	MPC · JPL
795000	2007 UO_{120}	—	October 4, 2007	Kitt Peak	Spacewatch	(5)	610 m	MPC · JPL

back to top
