= List of minor planets: 758001–759000 =

The following is a partial list of minor planets, running from minor-planet number 758001 through 759000, inclusive. The primary data for this and other partial lists is based on JPL's "Small-Body Orbital Elements" and data available from the Minor Planet Center. Critical list information is also provided by the MPC, unless otherwise specified from Lowell Observatory. A detailed description of the table's columns and additional sources are given on the main page including a complete list of every page in this series, and a statistical break-up on the dynamical classification of minor planets.

Also see the summary list of all named bodies in numerical and alphabetical order, and the corresponding naming citations for the number range of this particular list. New namings may only be added to this list after official publication, as the preannouncement of names is condemned by the Working Group for Small Bodies Nomenclature of the International Astronomical Union.

Near-Earth obj.	MBA (inner)	MBA (outer)	Centaur
Mars-crosser	MBA (middle)	Jupiter trojan	Trans-Neptunian obj.
Unclassified

== 758001–758100 ==
Designation			Discovery			Properties		Ref
Permanent	Provisional	Named after	Date	Site	Discoverer(s)	Category	Diam.	Ref
758001	2005 UU_{311}	—	October 29, 2005	Mount Lemmon	Mount Lemmon Survey	AGN	900 m	MPC · JPL
758002	2005 UG_{323}	—	October 28, 2005	Mount Lemmon	Mount Lemmon Survey	·	1.3 km	MPC · JPL
758003	2005 UX_{324}	—	October 29, 2005	Mount Lemmon	Mount Lemmon Survey	·	930 m	MPC · JPL
758004	2005 UY_{340}	—	October 31, 2005	Kitt Peak	Spacewatch	·	1.4 km	MPC · JPL
758005	2005 UK_{342}	—	October 31, 2005	Mount Lemmon	Mount Lemmon Survey	·	1.3 km	MPC · JPL
758006	2005 UN_{342}	—	October 27, 2005	Kitt Peak	Spacewatch	·	2.0 km	MPC · JPL
758007	2005 UA_{363}	—	October 27, 2005	Mount Lemmon	Mount Lemmon Survey	KOR	920 m	MPC · JPL
758008	2005 UK_{372}	—	October 27, 2005	Kitt Peak	Spacewatch	(5)	860 m	MPC · JPL
758009	2005 UT_{373}	—	October 27, 2005	Kitt Peak	Spacewatch	HOF	1.9 km	MPC · JPL
758010	2005 UG_{378}	—	October 28, 2005	Mount Lemmon	Mount Lemmon Survey	MAS	500 m	MPC · JPL
758011	2005 UM_{378}	—	October 29, 2005	Kitt Peak	Spacewatch	·	1.5 km	MPC · JPL
758012	2005 UR_{379}	—	October 29, 2005	Mount Lemmon	Mount Lemmon Survey	3:2	3.4 km	MPC · JPL
758013	2005 US_{389}	—	October 11, 2005	Kitt Peak	Spacewatch	·	1.3 km	MPC · JPL
758014	2005 UW_{413}	—	October 7, 2005	Mount Lemmon	Mount Lemmon Survey	·	1.4 km	MPC · JPL
758015	2005 UF_{417}	—	October 25, 2005	Kitt Peak	Spacewatch	AGN	780 m	MPC · JPL
758016	2005 UQ_{421}	—	October 27, 2005	Mount Lemmon	Mount Lemmon Survey	·	1.3 km	MPC · JPL
758017	2005 UD_{435}	—	October 29, 2005	Mount Lemmon	Mount Lemmon Survey	·	2.7 km	MPC · JPL
758018	2005 UG_{462}	—	October 30, 2005	Kitt Peak	Spacewatch	NYS	950 m	MPC · JPL
758019	2005 UO_{464}	—	October 30, 2005	Kitt Peak	Spacewatch	·	1.2 km	MPC · JPL
758020	2005 UX_{465}	—	October 30, 2005	Kitt Peak	Spacewatch	AGN	860 m	MPC · JPL
758021	2005 UF_{466}	—	October 30, 2005	Kitt Peak	Spacewatch	MRX	700 m	MPC · JPL
758022	2005 UR_{466}	—	October 30, 2005	Kitt Peak	Spacewatch	KOR	1.1 km	MPC · JPL
758023	2005 UQ_{467}	—	October 30, 2005	Kitt Peak	Spacewatch	·	890 m	MPC · JPL
758024	2005 UZ_{473}	—	October 31, 2005	Mount Lemmon	Mount Lemmon Survey	·	1.4 km	MPC · JPL
758025	2005 UD_{513}	—	October 27, 2005	Kitt Peak	Spacewatch	·	740 m	MPC · JPL
758026	2005 UP_{519}	—	October 30, 2005	Apache Point	SDSS Collaboration	(18466)	1.3 km	MPC · JPL
758027	2005 UW_{522}	—	October 30, 2005	Apache Point	SDSS Collaboration	MAR	630 m	MPC · JPL
758028	2005 UO_{524}	—	October 24, 2005	Kitt Peak	Spacewatch	·	1.5 km	MPC · JPL
758029	2005 UV_{535}	—	March 12, 2008	Kitt Peak	Spacewatch	·	1.2 km	MPC · JPL
758030	2005 UQ_{540}	—	October 29, 2005	Kitt Peak	Spacewatch	·	1.6 km	MPC · JPL
758031	2005 UF_{544}	—	March 13, 2012	Mount Lemmon	Mount Lemmon Survey	·	1.4 km	MPC · JPL
758032	2005 UK_{544}	—	October 29, 2005	Mount Lemmon	Mount Lemmon Survey	PHO	600 m	MPC · JPL
758033	2005 UW_{545}	—	January 18, 2016	Haleakala	Pan-STARRS 1	·	1.6 km	MPC · JPL
758034	2005 UL_{547}	—	October 28, 2005	Kitt Peak	Spacewatch	KOR	1.1 km	MPC · JPL
758035	2005 UQ_{549}	—	October 27, 2005	Kitt Peak	Spacewatch	·	750 m	MPC · JPL
758036	2005 UJ_{552}	—	October 27, 2005	Kitt Peak	Spacewatch	·	1.3 km	MPC · JPL
758037	2005 US_{554}	—	October 25, 2005	Kitt Peak	Spacewatch	·	1.3 km	MPC · JPL
758038	2005 UN_{555}	—	October 25, 2005	Mount Lemmon	Mount Lemmon Survey	THM	1.7 km	MPC · JPL
758039	2005 UG_{557}	—	October 29, 2005	Kitt Peak	Spacewatch	·	1.3 km	MPC · JPL
758040	2005 UO_{559}	—	October 27, 2005	Kitt Peak	Spacewatch	·	1.4 km	MPC · JPL
758041	2005 VC_{9}	—	October 25, 2005	Mount Lemmon	Mount Lemmon Survey	·	720 m	MPC · JPL
758042	2005 VZ_{11}	—	October 27, 2005	Kitt Peak	Spacewatch	NYS	810 m	MPC · JPL
758043	2005 VK_{13}	—	October 26, 2005	Kitt Peak	Spacewatch	·	1.6 km	MPC · JPL
758044	2005 VA_{23}	—	November 1, 2005	Kitt Peak	Spacewatch	·	1.4 km	MPC · JPL
758045	2005 VZ_{34}	—	November 3, 2005	Mount Lemmon	Mount Lemmon Survey	·	570 m	MPC · JPL
758046	2005 VA_{45}	—	November 4, 2005	Kitt Peak	Spacewatch	·	1.5 km	MPC · JPL
758047	2005 VA_{46}	—	October 28, 2005	Mount Lemmon	Mount Lemmon Survey	·	1.2 km	MPC · JPL
758048	2005 VD_{47}	—	October 24, 2005	Kitt Peak	Spacewatch	·	780 m	MPC · JPL
758049	2005 VU_{47}	—	November 5, 2005	Kitt Peak	Spacewatch	KOR	980 m	MPC · JPL
758050	2005 VG_{64}	—	October 26, 2005	Kitt Peak	Spacewatch	KOR	1.0 km	MPC · JPL
758051	2005 VS_{72}	—	October 31, 2005	Mount Lemmon	Mount Lemmon Survey	·	970 m	MPC · JPL
758052	2005 VT_{83}	—	November 3, 2005	Mount Lemmon	Mount Lemmon Survey	NYS	790 m	MPC · JPL
758053	2005 VN_{86}	—	November 5, 2005	Kitt Peak	Spacewatch	·	1.6 km	MPC · JPL
758054	2005 VD_{94}	—	November 6, 2005	Mount Lemmon	Mount Lemmon Survey	·	790 m	MPC · JPL
758055	2005 VV_{103}	—	November 3, 2005	Kitt Peak	Spacewatch	·	870 m	MPC · JPL
758056	2005 VF_{105}	—	October 25, 2005	Kitt Peak	Spacewatch	·	1.3 km	MPC · JPL
758057	2005 VU_{113}	—	November 10, 2005	Kitt Peak	Spacewatch	HOF	2.0 km	MPC · JPL
758058	2005 VA_{116}	—	November 11, 2005	Kitt Peak	Spacewatch	·	1.6 km	MPC · JPL
758059	2005 VA_{134}	—	October 31, 2005	Apache Point	SDSS Collaboration	·	1.9 km	MPC · JPL
758060	2005 VP_{140}	—	November 4, 2005	Kitt Peak	Spacewatch	MAS	630 m	MPC · JPL
758061	2005 VM_{141}	—	June 4, 2014	Haleakala	Pan-STARRS 1	·	1.8 km	MPC · JPL
758062	2005 VB_{142}	—	March 15, 2012	Mount Lemmon	Mount Lemmon Survey	·	1.4 km	MPC · JPL
758063	2005 VS_{142}	—	November 12, 2005	Kitt Peak	Spacewatch	·	2.9 km	MPC · JPL
758064	2005 VV_{143}	—	April 9, 2013	Haleakala	Pan-STARRS 1	·	1.6 km	MPC · JPL
758065	2005 VT_{144}	—	August 22, 2014	Haleakala	Pan-STARRS 1	·	1.5 km	MPC · JPL
758066	2005 VL_{148}	—	November 21, 2014	Haleakala	Pan-STARRS 1	·	1.5 km	MPC · JPL
758067	2005 VV_{148}	—	January 3, 2011	Mount Lemmon	Mount Lemmon Survey	·	1.5 km	MPC · JPL
758068	2005 VJ_{149}	—	February 22, 2018	Mount Lemmon	Mount Lemmon Survey	NYS	900 m	MPC · JPL
758069	2005 VP_{149}	—	November 4, 2005	Mount Lemmon	Mount Lemmon Survey	·	850 m	MPC · JPL
758070	2005 VV_{149}	—	November 4, 2005	Kitt Peak	Spacewatch	KOR	1.1 km	MPC · JPL
758071	2005 VC_{150}	—	August 30, 2014	Kitt Peak	Spacewatch	·	1.5 km	MPC · JPL
758072	2005 VN_{150}	—	November 12, 2005	Kitt Peak	Spacewatch	·	1.4 km	MPC · JPL
758073	2005 VA_{152}	—	November 1, 2005	Mount Lemmon	Mount Lemmon Survey	DOR	1.4 km	MPC · JPL
758074	2005 VA_{154}	—	November 3, 2005	Kitt Peak	Spacewatch	·	1.2 km	MPC · JPL
758075	2005 VP_{154}	—	November 6, 2005	Mount Lemmon	Mount Lemmon Survey	·	1.5 km	MPC · JPL
758076	2005 VC_{158}	—	November 1, 2005	Kitt Peak	Spacewatch	·	1.3 km	MPC · JPL
758077	2005 WD_{24}	—	October 25, 2005	Kitt Peak	Spacewatch	·	1.4 km	MPC · JPL
758078	2005 WC_{44}	—	October 26, 2005	Kitt Peak	Spacewatch	·	2.2 km	MPC · JPL
758079	2005 WL_{62}	—	November 25, 2005	Catalina	CSS	TIN	1.0 km	MPC · JPL
758080	2005 WG_{98}	—	October 29, 2005	Catalina	CSS	·	1.6 km	MPC · JPL
758081	2005 WB_{119}	—	October 30, 2005	Mount Lemmon	Mount Lemmon Survey	·	1.1 km	MPC · JPL
758082	2005 WW_{125}	—	October 28, 2005	Kitt Peak	Spacewatch	·	430 m	MPC · JPL
758083	2005 WE_{137}	—	November 26, 2005	Mount Lemmon	Mount Lemmon Survey	AGN	930 m	MPC · JPL
758084	2005 WZ_{145}	—	September 21, 2001	Kitt Peak	Spacewatch	·	720 m	MPC · JPL
758085	2005 WV_{149}	—	November 28, 2005	Kitt Peak	Spacewatch	·	810 m	MPC · JPL
758086	2005 WT_{215}	—	April 24, 2011	Kitt Peak	Spacewatch	MAS	580 m	MPC · JPL
758087	2005 WJ_{216}	—	September 2, 2014	Haleakala	Pan-STARRS 1	·	1.3 km	MPC · JPL
758088	2005 WQ_{220}	—	November 25, 2005	Mount Lemmon	Mount Lemmon Survey	(260)	2.5 km	MPC · JPL
758089	2005 XR_{30}	—	December 1, 2005	Kitt Peak	Spacewatch	·	2.2 km	MPC · JPL
758090	2005 XO_{31}	—	December 1, 2005	Kitt Peak	Spacewatch	MAR	760 m	MPC · JPL
758091	2005 XE_{43}	—	December 2, 2005	Kitt Peak	Spacewatch	·	1.7 km	MPC · JPL
758092	2005 XU_{54}	—	December 5, 2005	Kitt Peak	Spacewatch	·	730 m	MPC · JPL
758093	2005 XJ_{58}	—	December 2, 2005	Mount Lemmon	Mount Lemmon Survey	AGN	920 m	MPC · JPL
758094	2005 XO_{64}	—	October 29, 2005	Mount Lemmon	Mount Lemmon Survey	KOR	1.1 km	MPC · JPL
758095	2005 XE_{89}	—	December 6, 2005	Kitt Peak	Spacewatch	·	1.8 km	MPC · JPL
758096	2005 XH_{101}	—	January 7, 2006	Mount Lemmon	Mount Lemmon Survey	THM	1.5 km	MPC · JPL
758097	2005 XZ_{120}	—	December 4, 2005	Kitt Peak	Spacewatch	·	1.4 km	MPC · JPL
758098	2005 XN_{121}	—	April 27, 2012	Haleakala	Pan-STARRS 1	EOS	1.5 km	MPC · JPL
758099	2005 XJ_{122}	—	December 4, 2005	Kitt Peak	Spacewatch	·	2.8 km	MPC · JPL
758100	2005 XD_{127}	—	September 24, 2009	Mount Lemmon	Mount Lemmon Survey	·	1.8 km	MPC · JPL

== 758101–758200 ==
back to top

Designation			Discovery			Properties		Ref
Permanent	Provisional	Named after	Date	Site	Discoverer(s)	Category	Diam.	Ref
758101	2005 XV_{127}	—	April 10, 2015	Mount Lemmon	Mount Lemmon Survey	·	3.3 km	MPC · JPL
758102	2005 XU_{129}	—	October 16, 2016	Haleakala	Pan-STARRS 1	PHO	800 m	MPC · JPL
758103	2005 XG_{131}	—	September 29, 2014	Haleakala	Pan-STARRS 1	·	1.3 km	MPC · JPL
758104	2005 XQ_{131}	—	December 6, 2005	Kitt Peak	Spacewatch	MAS	550 m	MPC · JPL
758105	2005 XR_{131}	—	August 25, 2014	Haleakala	Pan-STARRS 1	KOR	1.1 km	MPC · JPL
758106	2005 XC_{135}	—	December 5, 2005	Mount Lemmon	Mount Lemmon Survey	·	2.6 km	MPC · JPL
758107	2005 XV_{135}	—	December 2, 2005	Kitt Peak	Wasserman, L. H., Millis, R. L.	·	1.1 km	MPC · JPL
758108	2005 YF_{21}	—	December 24, 2005	Kitt Peak	Spacewatch	H	430 m	MPC · JPL
758109	2005 YO_{64}	—	November 12, 2005	Kitt Peak	Spacewatch	·	3.2 km	MPC · JPL
758110	2005 YR_{69}	—	December 26, 2005	Kitt Peak	Spacewatch	GEF	820 m	MPC · JPL
758111	2005 YY_{77}	—	December 24, 2005	Kitt Peak	Spacewatch	·	1.4 km	MPC · JPL
758112	2005 YD_{104}	—	December 25, 2005	Kitt Peak	Spacewatch	·	1.1 km	MPC · JPL
758113	2005 YD_{110}	—	December 25, 2005	Kitt Peak	Spacewatch	·	850 m	MPC · JPL
758114	2005 YH_{115}	—	December 25, 2005	Kitt Peak	Spacewatch	DOR	1.8 km	MPC · JPL
758115	2005 YD_{122}	—	December 28, 2005	Mount Lemmon	Mount Lemmon Survey	·	1.4 km	MPC · JPL
758116	2005 YL_{130}	—	December 25, 2005	Kitt Peak	Spacewatch	H	470 m	MPC · JPL
758117	2005 YK_{142}	—	December 28, 2005	Kitt Peak	Spacewatch	AGN	920 m	MPC · JPL
758118	2005 YC_{188}	—	December 2, 2005	Mount Lemmon	Mount Lemmon Survey	·	1.1 km	MPC · JPL
758119	2005 YF_{223}	—	December 24, 2005	Kitt Peak	Spacewatch	KOR	950 m	MPC · JPL
758120	2005 YL_{223}	—	December 24, 2005	Kitt Peak	Spacewatch	KOR	950 m	MPC · JPL
758121	2005 YU_{252}	—	December 29, 2005	Kitt Peak	Spacewatch	HOF	1.9 km	MPC · JPL
758122	2005 YE_{265}	—	December 25, 2005	Kitt Peak	Spacewatch	·	2.0 km	MPC · JPL
758123	2005 YN_{265}	—	December 26, 2005	Kitt Peak	Spacewatch	(5)	950 m	MPC · JPL
758124	2005 YX_{266}	—	December 28, 2005	Kitt Peak	Spacewatch	·	790 m	MPC · JPL
758125	2005 YN_{283}	—	December 27, 2005	Kitt Peak	Spacewatch	H	490 m	MPC · JPL
758126	2005 YJ_{286}	—	December 30, 2005	Kitt Peak	Spacewatch	·	2.3 km	MPC · JPL
758127	2005 YY_{288}	—	December 30, 2005	Mount Lemmon	Mount Lemmon Survey	·	410 m	MPC · JPL
758128	2005 YC_{293}	—	May 20, 2014	Haleakala	Pan-STARRS 1	·	720 m	MPC · JPL
758129	2005 YT_{295}	—	November 25, 2005	Kitt Peak	Spacewatch	·	1.7 km	MPC · JPL
758130	2005 YH_{297}	—	February 26, 2014	Haleakala	Pan-STARRS 1	·	800 m	MPC · JPL
758131	2005 YE_{299}	—	December 5, 2010	Mount Lemmon	Mount Lemmon Survey	·	1.2 km	MPC · JPL
758132	2005 YG_{300}	—	December 25, 2005	Mount Lemmon	Mount Lemmon Survey	·	490 m	MPC · JPL
758133	2005 YJ_{301}	—	December 25, 2005	Kitt Peak	Spacewatch	·	780 m	MPC · JPL
758134	2005 YY_{301}	—	December 25, 2005	Mount Lemmon	Mount Lemmon Survey	·	480 m	MPC · JPL
758135	2005 YT_{302}	—	December 4, 2005	Mount Lemmon	Mount Lemmon Survey	·	770 m	MPC · JPL
758136	2006 AF_{23}	—	December 22, 2005	Kitt Peak	Spacewatch	·	2.8 km	MPC · JPL
758137	2006 AS_{27}	—	December 28, 2005	Kitt Peak	Spacewatch	LIX	2.5 km	MPC · JPL
758138	2006 AE_{50}	—	December 28, 2005	Mount Lemmon	Mount Lemmon Survey	·	1.5 km	MPC · JPL
758139	2006 AZ_{75}	—	January 5, 2006	Kitt Peak	Spacewatch	·	1.4 km	MPC · JPL
758140	2006 AK_{87}	—	January 4, 2006	Kitt Peak	Spacewatch	·	580 m	MPC · JPL
758141	2006 AZ_{112}	—	March 29, 2015	Haleakala	Pan-STARRS 1	·	1.3 km	MPC · JPL
758142	2006 AS_{114}	—	January 8, 2006	Mount Lemmon	Mount Lemmon Survey	·	470 m	MPC · JPL
758143	2006 BF_{42}	—	January 23, 2006	Kitt Peak	Spacewatch	·	1.4 km	MPC · JPL
758144	2006 BC_{67}	—	January 23, 2006	Kitt Peak	Spacewatch	·	830 m	MPC · JPL
758145	2006 BY_{67}	—	December 5, 2005	Mount Lemmon	Mount Lemmon Survey	MAS	680 m	MPC · JPL
758146	2006 BW_{110}	—	January 25, 2006	Kitt Peak	Spacewatch	·	570 m	MPC · JPL
758147	2006 BL_{122}	—	January 26, 2006	Kitt Peak	Spacewatch	PHO	770 m	MPC · JPL
758148	2006 BJ_{124}	—	January 22, 2002	Kitt Peak	Spacewatch	·	850 m	MPC · JPL
758149	2006 BA_{190}	—	January 28, 2006	Kitt Peak	Spacewatch	·	1.6 km	MPC · JPL
758150	2006 BR_{209}	—	January 31, 2006	Mount Lemmon	Mount Lemmon Survey	MAS	560 m	MPC · JPL
758151	2006 BG_{222}	—	January 30, 2006	Kitt Peak	Spacewatch	·	450 m	MPC · JPL
758152	2006 BS_{233}	—	January 31, 2006	Kitt Peak	Spacewatch	3:2 · SHU	4.0 km	MPC · JPL
758153	2006 BY_{234}	—	January 23, 2006	Kitt Peak	Spacewatch	·	1.1 km	MPC · JPL
758154	2006 BF_{235}	—	January 23, 2006	Kitt Peak	Spacewatch	·	1.7 km	MPC · JPL
758155	2006 BR_{243}	—	January 31, 2006	Kitt Peak	Spacewatch	·	1.1 km	MPC · JPL
758156	2006 BA_{246}	—	January 31, 2006	Mount Lemmon	Mount Lemmon Survey	·	710 m	MPC · JPL
758157	2006 BR_{246}	—	January 31, 2006	Mount Lemmon	Mount Lemmon Survey	VER	2.1 km	MPC · JPL
758158	2006 BH_{286}	—	January 22, 2006	Mount Lemmon	Mount Lemmon Survey	·	1.4 km	MPC · JPL
758159	2006 BK_{294}	—	February 5, 2016	Haleakala	Pan-STARRS 1	·	420 m	MPC · JPL
758160	2006 BP_{296}	—	September 25, 2009	Kitt Peak	Spacewatch	EOS	1.4 km	MPC · JPL
758161	2006 BR_{296}	—	January 27, 2006	Mount Lemmon	Mount Lemmon Survey	EOS	1.3 km	MPC · JPL
758162	2006 BT_{296}	—	February 4, 2017	Haleakala	Pan-STARRS 1	·	1.4 km	MPC · JPL
758163	2006 BS_{297}	—	January 30, 2006	Kitt Peak	Spacewatch	·	760 m	MPC · JPL
758164	2006 BB_{298}	—	January 31, 2006	Kitt Peak	Spacewatch	·	920 m	MPC · JPL
758165	2006 BH_{298}	—	January 22, 2006	Mount Lemmon	Mount Lemmon Survey	·	1.5 km	MPC · JPL
758166	2006 BS_{298}	—	January 23, 2006	Kitt Peak	Spacewatch	·	450 m	MPC · JPL
758167	2006 BY_{298}	—	January 31, 2006	Kitt Peak	Spacewatch	·	860 m	MPC · JPL
758168	2006 BS_{301}	—	January 22, 2006	Mount Lemmon	Mount Lemmon Survey	HOF	1.8 km	MPC · JPL
758169	2006 BO_{303}	—	January 31, 2006	Kitt Peak	Spacewatch	·	2.2 km	MPC · JPL
758170	2006 CX_{2}	—	February 1, 2006	Mount Lemmon	Mount Lemmon Survey	EOS	1.4 km	MPC · JPL
758171	2006 CF_{7}	—	January 26, 2006	Kitt Peak	Spacewatch	·	1.7 km	MPC · JPL
758172	2006 CO_{22}	—	February 1, 2006	Mount Lemmon	Mount Lemmon Survey	·	1.8 km	MPC · JPL
758173	2006 CL_{51}	—	February 4, 2006	Kitt Peak	Spacewatch	·	2.2 km	MPC · JPL
758174	2006 CJ_{54}	—	February 4, 2006	Mount Lemmon	Mount Lemmon Survey	·	890 m	MPC · JPL
758175	2006 CU_{66}	—	February 1, 2006	Kitt Peak	Spacewatch	·	800 m	MPC · JPL
758176	2006 CM_{83}	—	January 12, 2011	Kitt Peak	Spacewatch	·	1.5 km	MPC · JPL
758177	2006 CB_{86}	—	November 27, 2013	Haleakala	Pan-STARRS 1	(5)	860 m	MPC · JPL
758178	2006 CQ_{88}	—	February 4, 2006	Kitt Peak	Spacewatch	·	1.6 km	MPC · JPL
758179	2006 DN_{58}	—	February 24, 2006	Mount Lemmon	Mount Lemmon Survey	·	800 m	MPC · JPL
758180	2006 DL_{91}	—	February 24, 2006	Kitt Peak	Spacewatch	·	2.2 km	MPC · JPL
758181	2006 DF_{101}	—	February 25, 2006	Mount Lemmon	Mount Lemmon Survey	·	690 m	MPC · JPL
758182	2006 DL_{133}	—	January 31, 2006	Kitt Peak	Spacewatch	·	830 m	MPC · JPL
758183	2006 DS_{135}	—	February 25, 2006	Mount Lemmon	Mount Lemmon Survey	PAD	1.3 km	MPC · JPL
758184	2006 DS_{141}	—	February 25, 2006	Kitt Peak	Spacewatch	·	2.0 km	MPC · JPL
758185	2006 DC_{143}	—	February 25, 2006	Kitt Peak	Spacewatch	·	2.1 km	MPC · JPL
758186	2006 DY_{153}	—	February 25, 2006	Kitt Peak	Spacewatch	·	960 m	MPC · JPL
758187	2006 DL_{158}	—	February 27, 2006	Kitt Peak	Spacewatch	·	2.3 km	MPC · JPL
758188	2006 DU_{171}	—	February 27, 2006	Kitt Peak	Spacewatch	·	910 m	MPC · JPL
758189	2006 DN_{179}	—	February 27, 2006	Mount Lemmon	Mount Lemmon Survey	·	1.3 km	MPC · JPL
758190	2006 DF_{194}	—	February 28, 2006	Mount Lemmon	Mount Lemmon Survey	·	1.3 km	MPC · JPL
758191	2006 DL_{224}	—	October 2, 2014	Mount Lemmon	Mount Lemmon Survey	·	1.4 km	MPC · JPL
758192	2006 DM_{224}	—	December 22, 2008	Mount Lemmon	Mount Lemmon Survey	·	380 m	MPC · JPL
758193	2006 DB_{225}	—	February 21, 2006	Mount Lemmon	Mount Lemmon Survey	EOS	1.4 km	MPC · JPL
758194	2006 DT_{225}	—	February 27, 2006	Kitt Peak	Spacewatch	·	1.1 km	MPC · JPL
758195	2006 EG_{42}	—	March 4, 2006	Kitt Peak	Spacewatch	·	970 m	MPC · JPL
758196	2006 EA_{69}	—	March 3, 2006	Kitt Peak	Spacewatch	KOR	990 m	MPC · JPL
758197	2006 ER_{74}	—	March 6, 2006	Kitt Peak	Spacewatch	·	1.5 km	MPC · JPL
758198	2006 ES_{77}	—	September 6, 2008	Kitt Peak	Spacewatch	·	1.2 km	MPC · JPL
758199	2006 EU_{77}	—	February 13, 2011	Mount Lemmon	Mount Lemmon Survey	KOR	1.1 km	MPC · JPL
758200	2006 EX_{77}	—	October 10, 2015	Haleakala	Pan-STARRS 1	·	1.8 km	MPC · JPL

== 758201–758300 ==
back to top

Designation			Discovery			Properties		Ref
Permanent	Provisional	Named after	Date	Site	Discoverer(s)	Category	Diam.	Ref
758201	2006 EQ_{79}	—	December 14, 2017	Mount Lemmon	Mount Lemmon Survey	(5)	900 m	MPC · JPL
758202	2006 EA_{80}	—	March 4, 2006	Kitt Peak	Spacewatch	·	1.4 km	MPC · JPL
758203	2006 EO_{80}	—	July 30, 2017	Haleakala	Pan-STARRS 1	·	1.3 km	MPC · JPL
758204	2006 EP_{80}	—	November 2, 2008	Mount Lemmon	Mount Lemmon Survey	·	1.2 km	MPC · JPL
758205	2006 EG_{81}	—	November 17, 2014	Haleakala	Pan-STARRS 1	KOR	1.0 km	MPC · JPL
758206	2006 EF_{82}	—	March 4, 2006	Mount Lemmon	Mount Lemmon Survey	EOS	1.3 km	MPC · JPL
758207	2006 EC_{83}	—	March 4, 2006	Mount Lemmon	Mount Lemmon Survey	·	910 m	MPC · JPL
758208	2006 FU_{26}	—	March 24, 2006	Mount Lemmon	Mount Lemmon Survey	LIX	2.3 km	MPC · JPL
758209	2006 FH_{31}	—	March 25, 2006	Mount Lemmon	Mount Lemmon Survey	·	880 m	MPC · JPL
758210	2006 FX_{31}	—	March 25, 2006	Kitt Peak	Spacewatch	·	1.4 km	MPC · JPL
758211	2006 FJ_{57}	—	August 27, 2014	Haleakala	Pan-STARRS 1	·	2.2 km	MPC · JPL
758212	2006 FH_{60}	—	March 24, 2006	Mount Lemmon	Mount Lemmon Survey	·	2.3 km	MPC · JPL
758213	2006 FG_{61}	—	March 24, 2006	Mount Lemmon	Mount Lemmon Survey	KON	1.9 km	MPC · JPL
758214	2006 GX_{28}	—	April 2, 2006	Kitt Peak	Spacewatch	·	1.0 km	MPC · JPL
758215	2006 GB_{29}	—	May 7, 2002	Kitt Peak	Spacewatch	EUN	860 m	MPC · JPL
758216	2006 GF_{58}	—	April 2, 2006	Mount Lemmon	Mount Lemmon Survey	·	1.9 km	MPC · JPL
758217	2006 HQ_{2}	—	March 29, 2006	Kitt Peak	Spacewatch	·	530 m	MPC · JPL
758218	2006 HE_{12}	—	April 19, 2006	Kitt Peak	Spacewatch	EUN	760 m	MPC · JPL
758219	2006 HA_{21}	—	April 2, 2006	Mount Lemmon	Mount Lemmon Survey	·	1.4 km	MPC · JPL
758220	2006 HC_{58}	—	October 5, 2013	Kitt Peak	Spacewatch	TIR	2.4 km	MPC · JPL
758221	2006 HL_{71}	—	April 25, 2006	Kitt Peak	Spacewatch	·	2.0 km	MPC · JPL
758222	2006 HH_{83}	—	April 26, 2006	Kitt Peak	Spacewatch	·	570 m	MPC · JPL
758223	2006 HU_{84}	—	April 26, 2006	Kitt Peak	Spacewatch	TIR	2.3 km	MPC · JPL
758224	2006 HQ_{93}	—	April 29, 2006	Kitt Peak	Spacewatch	·	2.2 km	MPC · JPL
758225	2006 HU_{93}	—	April 29, 2006	Kitt Peak	Spacewatch	TIR	1.9 km	MPC · JPL
758226	2006 HT_{97}	—	April 30, 2006	Kitt Peak	Spacewatch	·	1.5 km	MPC · JPL
758227	2006 HQ_{113}	—	April 25, 2006	Kitt Peak	Spacewatch	·	1.9 km	MPC · JPL
758228	2006 HK_{128}	—	April 26, 2006	Cerro Tololo	Deep Ecliptic Survey	L5	6.0 km	MPC · JPL
758229	2006 HH_{132}	—	March 6, 2006	Kitt Peak	Spacewatch	KOR	930 m	MPC · JPL
758230	2006 HH_{146}	—	April 27, 2006	Cerro Tololo	Deep Ecliptic Survey	·	940 m	MPC · JPL
758231	2006 HG_{148}	—	April 27, 2006	Cerro Tololo	Deep Ecliptic Survey	MAS	580 m	MPC · JPL
758232	2006 HO_{149}	—	April 27, 2006	Cerro Tololo	Deep Ecliptic Survey	·	1.5 km	MPC · JPL
758233	2006 HP_{153}	—	April 24, 2006	Kitt Peak	Spacewatch	·	1.3 km	MPC · JPL
758234	2006 HU_{155}	—	April 26, 2006	Kitt Peak	Spacewatch	JUN	720 m	MPC · JPL
758235	2006 HC_{156}	—	April 30, 2006	Kitt Peak	Spacewatch	·	550 m	MPC · JPL
758236	2006 HH_{156}	—	May 20, 2006	Kitt Peak	Spacewatch	·	2.5 km	MPC · JPL
758237	2006 HP_{156}	—	December 27, 2011	Mount Lemmon	Mount Lemmon Survey	·	460 m	MPC · JPL
758238	2006 HU_{157}	—	April 30, 2006	Kitt Peak	Spacewatch	·	1.2 km	MPC · JPL
758239	2006 HM_{159}	—	April 24, 2006	Kitt Peak	Spacewatch	·	2.6 km	MPC · JPL
758240	2006 HN_{161}	—	April 26, 2006	Kitt Peak	Spacewatch	·	1.9 km	MPC · JPL
758241	2006 JG_{5}	—	May 3, 2006	Mount Lemmon	Mount Lemmon Survey	MAS	610 m	MPC · JPL
758242	2006 JR_{7}	—	May 1, 2006	Kitt Peak	Spacewatch	·	930 m	MPC · JPL
758243	2006 JX_{7}	—	May 1, 2006	Kitt Peak	Spacewatch	·	530 m	MPC · JPL
758244	2006 JX_{17}	—	April 24, 2006	Mount Lemmon	Mount Lemmon Survey	JUN	610 m	MPC · JPL
758245	2006 JW_{20}	—	May 2, 2006	Kitt Peak	Spacewatch	·	1.2 km	MPC · JPL
758246	2006 JE_{30}	—	April 21, 2006	Kitt Peak	Spacewatch	·	2.3 km	MPC · JPL
758247	2006 JA_{33}	—	May 3, 2006	Kitt Peak	Spacewatch	LIX	2.6 km	MPC · JPL
758248	2006 JB_{44}	—	March 24, 2006	Mount Lemmon	Mount Lemmon Survey	·	1.3 km	MPC · JPL
758249	2006 JF_{54}	—	April 25, 2006	Kitt Peak	Spacewatch	·	1.3 km	MPC · JPL
758250	2006 JF_{62}	—	January 31, 2006	Kitt Peak	Spacewatch	EOS	1.3 km	MPC · JPL
758251	2006 JX_{68}	—	March 26, 2006	Mount Lemmon	Mount Lemmon Survey	·	1.6 km	MPC · JPL
758252	2006 JR_{70}	—	April 19, 2006	Mount Lemmon	Mount Lemmon Survey	·	2.3 km	MPC · JPL
758253	2006 JM_{71}	—	May 1, 2006	Mauna Kea	P. A. Wiegert	·	1.8 km	MPC · JPL
758254	2006 JC_{78}	—	May 1, 2006	Mauna Kea	P. A. Wiegert	·	1.4 km	MPC · JPL
758255	2006 JR_{78}	—	May 1, 2006	Mauna Kea	P. A. Wiegert	(5)	1.0 km	MPC · JPL
758256	2006 JZ_{83}	—	October 1, 2013	Mount Lemmon	Mount Lemmon Survey	·	2.3 km	MPC · JPL
758257	2006 JO_{87}	—	November 26, 2014	Haleakala	Pan-STARRS 1	·	1.3 km	MPC · JPL
758258	2006 JM_{88}	—	May 1, 2006	Kitt Peak	Spacewatch	·	1.0 km	MPC · JPL
758259	2006 JN_{88}	—	May 9, 2006	Mount Lemmon	Mount Lemmon Survey	LIX	2.6 km	MPC · JPL
758260	2006 JT_{88}	—	May 6, 2006	Mount Lemmon	Mount Lemmon Survey	·	1.1 km	MPC · JPL
758261	2006 JW_{88}	—	May 8, 2006	Mount Lemmon	Mount Lemmon Survey	EUP	2.7 km	MPC · JPL
758262	2006 JT_{89}	—	May 3, 2006	Mount Lemmon	Mount Lemmon Survey	·	1.1 km	MPC · JPL
758263	2006 JZ_{89}	—	May 1, 2006	Kitt Peak	Spacewatch	·	820 m	MPC · JPL
758264	2006 KS_{13}	—	May 20, 2006	Kitt Peak	Spacewatch	·	940 m	MPC · JPL
758265	2006 KW_{13}	—	May 20, 2006	Kitt Peak	Spacewatch	·	2.1 km	MPC · JPL
758266	2006 KJ_{28}	—	May 4, 2006	Kitt Peak	Spacewatch	·	1.1 km	MPC · JPL
758267	2006 KZ_{28}	—	May 20, 2006	Kitt Peak	Spacewatch	·	2.1 km	MPC · JPL
758268	2006 KP_{40}	—	April 19, 2006	Kitt Peak	Spacewatch	·	1.8 km	MPC · JPL
758269	2006 KB_{44}	—	May 21, 2006	Kitt Peak	Spacewatch	EUN	930 m	MPC · JPL
758270	2006 KF_{44}	—	May 21, 2006	Kitt Peak	Spacewatch	·	1.8 km	MPC · JPL
758271	2006 KB_{55}	—	May 21, 2006	Kitt Peak	Spacewatch	NYS	830 m	MPC · JPL
758272	2006 KM_{55}	—	May 21, 2006	Kitt Peak	Spacewatch	·	1.5 km	MPC · JPL
758273	2006 KU_{72}	—	May 23, 2006	Mount Lemmon	Mount Lemmon Survey	LIX	3.2 km	MPC · JPL
758274	2006 KV_{77}	—	May 24, 2006	Mount Lemmon	Mount Lemmon Survey	·	2.5 km	MPC · JPL
758275	2006 KL_{129}	—	May 25, 2006	Mauna Kea	P. A. Wiegert	·	1.1 km	MPC · JPL
758276	2006 KR_{130}	—	May 25, 2006	Mauna Kea	P. A. Wiegert	THM	1.8 km	MPC · JPL
758277	2006 KA_{131}	—	October 1, 2003	Kitt Peak	Spacewatch	·	690 m	MPC · JPL
758278	2006 KD_{135}	—	May 25, 2006	Mauna Kea	P. A. Wiegert	·	2.4 km	MPC · JPL
758279	2006 KU_{147}	—	May 24, 2006	Mount Lemmon	Mount Lemmon Survey	·	2.2 km	MPC · JPL
758280	2006 KG_{150}	—	April 30, 2014	Haleakala	Pan-STARRS 1	·	780 m	MPC · JPL
758281	2006 KM_{150}	—	October 28, 2017	Haleakala	Pan-STARRS 1	·	520 m	MPC · JPL
758282	2006 KD_{151}	—	February 9, 2016	Haleakala	Pan-STARRS 1	·	2.1 km	MPC · JPL
758283	2006 KG_{151}	—	May 6, 2014	Mount Lemmon	Mount Lemmon Survey	·	1.2 km	MPC · JPL
758284	2006 KJ_{151}	—	January 12, 2016	Haleakala	Pan-STARRS 1	EOS	1.5 km	MPC · JPL
758285	2006 KP_{152}	—	May 6, 2006	Mount Lemmon	Mount Lemmon Survey	THM	2.0 km	MPC · JPL
758286	2006 KW_{152}	—	July 28, 2014	Haleakala	Pan-STARRS 1	·	860 m	MPC · JPL
758287	2006 KL_{153}	—	February 28, 2014	Haleakala	Pan-STARRS 1	·	780 m	MPC · JPL
758288	2006 KJ_{154}	—	May 31, 2006	Kitt Peak	Spacewatch	·	1.3 km	MPC · JPL
758289	2006 KF_{155}	—	May 20, 2006	Kitt Peak	Spacewatch	·	510 m	MPC · JPL
758290	2006 LH_{3}	—	June 15, 2006	Kitt Peak	Spacewatch	·	830 m	MPC · JPL
758291	2006 LL_{9}	—	November 22, 2014	Haleakala	Pan-STARRS 1	·	2.6 km	MPC · JPL
758292	2006 LN_{9}	—	June 25, 2015	Haleakala	Pan-STARRS 1	·	1.3 km	MPC · JPL
758293	2006 MX_{4}	—	June 17, 2006	Kitt Peak	Spacewatch	·	2.5 km	MPC · JPL
758294	2006 MH_{16}	—	December 21, 2008	Mount Lemmon	Mount Lemmon Survey	·	1.5 km	MPC · JPL
758295	2006 OY_{16}	—	July 21, 2006	Mount Lemmon	Mount Lemmon Survey	·	620 m	MPC · JPL
758296	2006 OL_{23}	—	July 21, 2006	Mount Lemmon	Mount Lemmon Survey	·	2.2 km	MPC · JPL
758297	2006 OC_{24}	—	July 19, 2006	Mauna Kea	P. A. Wiegert, D. Subasinghe	·	2.1 km	MPC · JPL
758298	2006 OX_{30}	—	October 15, 2007	Mount Lemmon	Mount Lemmon Survey	·	1.8 km	MPC · JPL
758299	2006 OQ_{32}	—	January 27, 2012	Mount Lemmon	Mount Lemmon Survey	·	860 m	MPC · JPL
758300	2006 OB_{34}	—	July 21, 2006	Mount Lemmon	Mount Lemmon Survey	·	630 m	MPC · JPL

== 758301–758400 ==
back to top

Designation			Discovery			Properties		Ref
Permanent	Provisional	Named after	Date	Site	Discoverer(s)	Category	Diam.	Ref
758301	2006 OH_{34}	—	July 19, 2006	Mauna Kea	P. A. Wiegert, D. Subasinghe	THM	1.7 km	MPC · JPL
758302	2006 OM_{36}	—	December 29, 2008	Kitt Peak	Spacewatch	·	1.9 km	MPC · JPL
758303	2006 OH_{37}	—	July 19, 2006	Mauna Kea	P. A. Wiegert, D. Subasinghe	·	1.1 km	MPC · JPL
758304	2006 OX_{38}	—	January 17, 2016	Haleakala	Pan-STARRS 1	·	2.2 km	MPC · JPL
758305	2006 OF_{39}	—	June 16, 2010	Mount Lemmon	Mount Lemmon Survey	·	1.1 km	MPC · JPL
758306	2006 OH_{39}	—	November 17, 2015	Haleakala	Pan-STARRS 1	·	920 m	MPC · JPL
758307	2006 OQ_{39}	—	September 12, 2015	Haleakala	Pan-STARRS 1	·	1.0 km	MPC · JPL
758308	2006 QP_{12}	—	August 16, 2006	Siding Spring	SSS	·	1.2 km	MPC · JPL
758309	2006 QJ_{28}	—	August 14, 2006	Siding Spring	SSS	(1547)	1.3 km	MPC · JPL
758310	2006 QB_{40}	—	August 16, 2006	Siding Spring	SSS	·	1.3 km	MPC · JPL
758311	2006 QH_{87}	—	August 19, 2006	Kitt Peak	Spacewatch	·	2.6 km	MPC · JPL
758312	2006 QQ_{101}	—	August 27, 2006	Kitt Peak	Spacewatch	·	2.8 km	MPC · JPL
758313	2006 QY_{153}	—	August 19, 2006	Kitt Peak	Spacewatch	·	2.2 km	MPC · JPL
758314	2006 QQ_{155}	—	August 19, 2006	Kitt Peak	Spacewatch	·	2.3 km	MPC · JPL
758315	2006 QR_{157}	—	September 20, 2001	Kitt Peak	Spacewatch	·	1.5 km	MPC · JPL
758316	2006 QT_{158}	—	August 19, 2006	Kitt Peak	Spacewatch	·	1.0 km	MPC · JPL
758317	2006 QX_{159}	—	August 19, 2006	Kitt Peak	Spacewatch	THM	1.9 km	MPC · JPL
758318	2006 QG_{162}	—	August 21, 2006	Kitt Peak	Spacewatch	·	1.2 km	MPC · JPL
758319	2006 QV_{163}	—	August 27, 2006	Kitt Peak	Spacewatch	·	1.5 km	MPC · JPL
758320	2006 QX_{174}	—	August 22, 2006	Cerro Tololo	Deep Ecliptic Survey	·	1.4 km	MPC · JPL
758321	2006 QC_{190}	—	August 27, 2006	Kitt Peak	Spacewatch	·	590 m	MPC · JPL
758322	2006 QA_{192}	—	August 29, 2006	Kitt Peak	Spacewatch	·	670 m	MPC · JPL
758323	2006 QC_{192}	—	March 16, 2012	Haleakala	Pan-STARRS 1	·	600 m	MPC · JPL
758324	2006 QZ_{192}	—	March 16, 2010	Kitt Peak	Spacewatch	THM	1.8 km	MPC · JPL
758325	2006 QW_{193}	—	January 21, 2015	Haleakala	Pan-STARRS 1	·	2.2 km	MPC · JPL
758326	2006 QY_{193}	—	August 29, 2006	Kitt Peak	Spacewatch	·	1.2 km	MPC · JPL
758327	2006 QF_{194}	—	August 28, 2006	Kitt Peak	Spacewatch	·	960 m	MPC · JPL
758328	2006 QN_{194}	—	August 19, 2006	Kitt Peak	Spacewatch	·	1.2 km	MPC · JPL
758329	2006 QC_{195}	—	September 9, 2015	Haleakala	Pan-STARRS 1	·	1.0 km	MPC · JPL
758330	2006 QN_{195}	—	July 6, 1997	Kitt Peak	Spacewatch	·	1.1 km	MPC · JPL
758331	2006 QS_{195}	—	August 28, 2006	Kitt Peak	Spacewatch	·	2.4 km	MPC · JPL
758332	2006 QU_{195}	—	August 19, 2006	Kitt Peak	Spacewatch	·	1.2 km	MPC · JPL
758333	2006 QW_{195}	—	June 12, 2016	Mount Lemmon	Mount Lemmon Survey	PHO	870 m	MPC · JPL
758334	2006 QX_{195}	—	May 6, 2014	Haleakala	Pan-STARRS 1	·	1.3 km	MPC · JPL
758335	2006 QA_{196}	—	August 29, 2006	Catalina	CSS	·	1.5 km	MPC · JPL
758336	2006 QD_{196}	—	October 18, 2012	Haleakala	Pan-STARRS 1	·	1.8 km	MPC · JPL
758337	2006 QC_{197}	—	November 3, 2007	Kitt Peak	Spacewatch	URS	2.1 km	MPC · JPL
758338	2006 QP_{197}	—	August 28, 2006	Kitt Peak	Spacewatch	·	1.1 km	MPC · JPL
758339	2006 QV_{198}	—	August 27, 2006	Kitt Peak	Spacewatch	·	2.7 km	MPC · JPL
758340	2006 QY_{198}	—	February 17, 2015	Haleakala	Pan-STARRS 1	·	2.0 km	MPC · JPL
758341	2006 QZ_{198}	—	August 27, 2006	Kitt Peak	Spacewatch	·	1.1 km	MPC · JPL
758342	2006 QF_{199}	—	August 29, 2006	Kitt Peak	Spacewatch	·	1.0 km	MPC · JPL
758343	2006 QL_{199}	—	August 29, 2006	Kitt Peak	Spacewatch	·	1.2 km	MPC · JPL
758344	2006 QU_{199}	—	October 24, 2011	Haleakala	Pan-STARRS 1	·	1.3 km	MPC · JPL
758345	2006 QC_{200}	—	August 29, 2006	Kitt Peak	Spacewatch	·	1.3 km	MPC · JPL
758346	2006 QM_{201}	—	August 27, 2006	Kitt Peak	Spacewatch	·	2.2 km	MPC · JPL
758347	2006 QM_{202}	—	August 28, 2006	Kitt Peak	Spacewatch	VER	2.1 km	MPC · JPL
758348	2006 QN_{202}	—	August 29, 2006	Catalina	CSS	THB	2.1 km	MPC · JPL
758349	2006 QS_{202}	—	August 19, 2006	Kitt Peak	Spacewatch	·	2.1 km	MPC · JPL
758350	2006 QW_{202}	—	August 21, 2006	Kitt Peak	Spacewatch	·	2.0 km	MPC · JPL
758351	2006 QM_{203}	—	August 21, 2006	Kitt Peak	Spacewatch	·	1.1 km	MPC · JPL
758352	2006 QJ_{204}	—	August 28, 2006	Kitt Peak	Spacewatch	·	540 m	MPC · JPL
758353	2006 QM_{204}	—	August 28, 2006	Catalina	CSS	·	570 m	MPC · JPL
758354	2006 QU_{204}	—	October 11, 1999	Kitt Peak	Spacewatch	NYS	550 m	MPC · JPL
758355	2006 QF_{205}	—	August 21, 2006	Kitt Peak	Spacewatch	(12739)	1.3 km	MPC · JPL
758356	2006 QA_{207}	—	August 29, 2006	Kitt Peak	Spacewatch	HYG	2.3 km	MPC · JPL
758357	2006 QX_{208}	—	August 21, 2006	Kitt Peak	Spacewatch	·	2.6 km	MPC · JPL
758358	2006 RN_{10}	—	August 21, 2006	Kitt Peak	Spacewatch	·	500 m	MPC · JPL
758359	2006 RD_{24}	—	September 14, 2006	Kitt Peak	Spacewatch	VER	2.0 km	MPC · JPL
758360	2006 RG_{42}	—	September 14, 2006	Kitt Peak	Spacewatch	·	460 m	MPC · JPL
758361	2006 RW_{50}	—	September 14, 2006	Kitt Peak	Spacewatch	·	720 m	MPC · JPL
758362	2006 RN_{72}	—	September 15, 2006	Kitt Peak	Spacewatch	·	490 m	MPC · JPL
758363	2006 RT_{87}	—	September 15, 2006	Kitt Peak	Spacewatch	·	2.5 km	MPC · JPL
758364	2006 RF_{89}	—	July 21, 2006	Mount Lemmon	Mount Lemmon Survey	·	590 m	MPC · JPL
758365	2006 RH_{93}	—	September 15, 2006	Kitt Peak	Spacewatch	·	1.2 km	MPC · JPL
758366	2006 RV_{93}	—	September 15, 2006	Kitt Peak	Spacewatch	·	1.4 km	MPC · JPL
758367	2006 RE_{95}	—	September 15, 2006	Kitt Peak	Spacewatch	·	660 m	MPC · JPL
758368	2006 RO_{117}	—	September 26, 2006	Mount Lemmon	Mount Lemmon Survey	·	1.9 km	MPC · JPL
758369	2006 RE_{123}	—	September 14, 2006	Catalina	CSS	ADE	1.4 km	MPC · JPL
758370	2006 RO_{123}	—	September 14, 2006	Catalina	CSS	·	1.3 km	MPC · JPL
758371	2006 RS_{123}	—	October 12, 2015	Haleakala	Pan-STARRS 1	·	1.2 km	MPC · JPL
758372	2006 RY_{124}	—	September 15, 2006	Kitt Peak	Spacewatch	(11882)	1.4 km	MPC · JPL
758373	2006 RN_{125}	—	September 15, 2006	Kitt Peak	Spacewatch	THM	1.7 km	MPC · JPL
758374	2006 RC_{127}	—	September 15, 2006	Kitt Peak	Spacewatch	·	2.8 km	MPC · JPL
758375	2006 SQ_{9}	—	August 28, 2006	Catalina	CSS	T_{j} (2.99) · EUP	2.6 km	MPC · JPL
758376	2006 SF_{25}	—	September 16, 2006	Kitt Peak	Spacewatch	·	2.4 km	MPC · JPL
758377	2006 SK_{29}	—	September 17, 2006	Kitt Peak	Spacewatch	·	1.9 km	MPC · JPL
758378	2006 SQ_{37}	—	September 17, 2006	Kitt Peak	Spacewatch	·	1.1 km	MPC · JPL
758379	2006 ST_{74}	—	September 19, 2006	Kitt Peak	Spacewatch	·	680 m	MPC · JPL
758380	2006 SW_{76}	—	September 20, 2006	Kitt Peak	Spacewatch	·	1.4 km	MPC · JPL
758381	2006 SX_{81}	—	September 18, 2006	Kitt Peak	Spacewatch	·	590 m	MPC · JPL
758382	2006 SY_{86}	—	September 18, 2006	Kitt Peak	Spacewatch	·	620 m	MPC · JPL
758383	2006 SO_{91}	—	September 18, 2006	Kitt Peak	Spacewatch	·	2.3 km	MPC · JPL
758384	2006 SJ_{94}	—	September 18, 2006	Kitt Peak	Spacewatch	·	2.7 km	MPC · JPL
758385	2006 SR_{101}	—	September 19, 2006	Kitt Peak	Spacewatch	URS	2.3 km	MPC · JPL
758386	2006 SB_{102}	—	September 19, 2006	Kitt Peak	Spacewatch	·	990 m	MPC · JPL
758387	2006 SM_{103}	—	September 19, 2006	Kitt Peak	Spacewatch	·	1.2 km	MPC · JPL
758388	2006 SF_{106}	—	September 19, 2006	Kitt Peak	Spacewatch	·	1.8 km	MPC · JPL
758389	2006 SH_{106}	—	September 19, 2006	Kitt Peak	Spacewatch	·	1.2 km	MPC · JPL
758390	2006 SE_{122}	—	September 19, 2006	Catalina	CSS	·	1.7 km	MPC · JPL
758391	2006 SF_{146}	—	September 19, 2006	Kitt Peak	Spacewatch	THM	1.8 km	MPC · JPL
758392	2006 SG_{146}	—	September 19, 2006	Kitt Peak	Spacewatch	·	1.1 km	MPC · JPL
758393	2006 SR_{149}	—	September 19, 2006	Kitt Peak	Spacewatch	·	1.2 km	MPC · JPL
758394	2006 SM_{152}	—	September 19, 2006	Kitt Peak	Spacewatch	MRX	770 m	MPC · JPL
758395	2006 SN_{162}	—	September 24, 2006	Kitt Peak	Spacewatch	HNS	780 m	MPC · JPL
758396	2006 SE_{163}	—	September 19, 2006	Kitt Peak	Spacewatch	·	1 km	MPC · JPL
758397	2006 SQ_{166}	—	September 25, 2006	Kitt Peak	Spacewatch	·	2.3 km	MPC · JPL
758398	2006 SQ_{170}	—	January 28, 2004	Kitt Peak	Spacewatch	·	600 m	MPC · JPL
758399	2006 SG_{173}	—	September 17, 2006	Kitt Peak	Spacewatch	·	1.2 km	MPC · JPL
758400	2006 SK_{177}	—	September 18, 2006	Kitt Peak	Spacewatch	·	1.3 km	MPC · JPL

== 758401–758500 ==
back to top

Designation			Discovery			Properties		Ref
Permanent	Provisional	Named after	Date	Site	Discoverer(s)	Category	Diam.	Ref
758401	2006 SC_{195}	—	September 15, 2006	Kitt Peak	Spacewatch	·	1.2 km	MPC · JPL
758402	2006 SL_{205}	—	September 25, 2006	Mount Lemmon	Mount Lemmon Survey	THM	1.6 km	MPC · JPL
758403	2006 SN_{216}	—	September 17, 2006	Kitt Peak	Spacewatch	·	1.5 km	MPC · JPL
758404	2006 SB_{227}	—	September 18, 2006	Kitt Peak	Spacewatch	·	1.2 km	MPC · JPL
758405	2006 SC_{233}	—	September 26, 2006	Kitt Peak	Spacewatch	·	600 m	MPC · JPL
758406	2006 SD_{233}	—	September 26, 2006	Kitt Peak	Spacewatch	·	2.2 km	MPC · JPL
758407	2006 SZ_{238}	—	September 15, 2006	Kitt Peak	Spacewatch	·	2.2 km	MPC · JPL
758408	2006 SQ_{242}	—	September 26, 2006	Kitt Peak	Spacewatch	·	1.2 km	MPC · JPL
758409	2006 SG_{243}	—	September 26, 2006	Kitt Peak	Spacewatch	·	2.4 km	MPC · JPL
758410	2006 SY_{243}	—	September 26, 2006	Kitt Peak	Spacewatch	·	970 m	MPC · JPL
758411	2006 SA_{245}	—	September 26, 2006	Kitt Peak	Spacewatch	·	1.4 km	MPC · JPL
758412	2006 SJ_{248}	—	September 26, 2006	Mount Lemmon	Mount Lemmon Survey	·	1.0 km	MPC · JPL
758413	2006 SX_{250}	—	September 26, 2006	Mount Lemmon	Mount Lemmon Survey	·	1.1 km	MPC · JPL
758414	2006 SW_{259}	—	September 26, 2006	Mount Lemmon	Mount Lemmon Survey	·	2.1 km	MPC · JPL
758415	2006 SG_{261}	—	September 26, 2006	Kitt Peak	Spacewatch	·	1.2 km	MPC · JPL
758416	2006 SE_{266}	—	September 26, 2006	Kitt Peak	Spacewatch	·	1.4 km	MPC · JPL
758417	2006 SM_{266}	—	September 26, 2006	Kitt Peak	Spacewatch	·	1.5 km	MPC · JPL
758418	2006 SY_{266}	—	September 26, 2006	Kitt Peak	Spacewatch	·	2.3 km	MPC · JPL
758419	2006 SQ_{268}	—	September 26, 2006	Kitt Peak	Spacewatch	·	2.2 km	MPC · JPL
758420	2006 SH_{284}	—	September 27, 2006	Catalina	CSS	ADE	1.7 km	MPC · JPL
758421	2006 SR_{288}	—	August 27, 2006	Lulin	LUSS	·	1.3 km	MPC · JPL
758422	2006 SJ_{298}	—	September 25, 2006	Mount Lemmon	Mount Lemmon Survey	MAS	450 m	MPC · JPL
758423	2006 SL_{299}	—	September 15, 2006	Kitt Peak	Spacewatch	H	380 m	MPC · JPL
758424	2006 SY_{300}	—	September 17, 2006	Kitt Peak	Spacewatch	·	1.0 km	MPC · JPL
758425	2006 SQ_{302}	—	September 27, 2006	Kitt Peak	Spacewatch	·	1.0 km	MPC · JPL
758426	2006 SF_{305}	—	September 27, 2006	Kitt Peak	Spacewatch	·	1.4 km	MPC · JPL
758427	2006 SK_{307}	—	September 17, 2006	Kitt Peak	Spacewatch	ADE	1.4 km	MPC · JPL
758428	2006 SA_{308}	—	September 17, 2006	Kitt Peak	Spacewatch	·	1.6 km	MPC · JPL
758429	2006 SD_{310}	—	September 27, 2006	Kitt Peak	Spacewatch	·	1.1 km	MPC · JPL
758430	2006 SN_{311}	—	September 19, 2006	Kitt Peak	Spacewatch	·	2.1 km	MPC · JPL
758431	2006 SU_{320}	—	September 27, 2006	Kitt Peak	Spacewatch	·	1.1 km	MPC · JPL
758432	2006 SX_{330}	—	September 28, 2006	Kitt Peak	Spacewatch	·	2.2 km	MPC · JPL
758433	2006 SF_{335}	—	September 28, 2006	Kitt Peak	Spacewatch	·	510 m	MPC · JPL
758434	2006 SX_{336}	—	September 28, 2006	Kitt Peak	Spacewatch	·	1.2 km	MPC · JPL
758435	2006 SW_{338}	—	September 28, 2006	Kitt Peak	Spacewatch	·	1.1 km	MPC · JPL
758436	2006 SC_{374}	—	September 16, 2006	Apache Point	SDSS Collaboration	·	1.3 km	MPC · JPL
758437	2006 SL_{374}	—	September 16, 2006	Apache Point	SDSS Collaboration	·	640 m	MPC · JPL
758438	2006 SK_{377}	—	September 17, 2006	Apache Point	SDSS Collaboration	·	2.4 km	MPC · JPL
758439	2006 SP_{381}	—	September 28, 2006	Apache Point	SDSS Collaboration	·	2.0 km	MPC · JPL
758440	2006 SY_{396}	—	September 18, 2006	Kitt Peak	Spacewatch	·	1.2 km	MPC · JPL
758441	2006 SV_{408}	—	September 25, 2006	Mount Lemmon	Mount Lemmon Survey	·	2.5 km	MPC · JPL
758442	2006 ST_{410}	—	September 18, 2006	Kitt Peak	Spacewatch	·	2.2 km	MPC · JPL
758443	2006 SO_{412}	—	September 30, 2006	Mount Lemmon	Mount Lemmon Survey	LUT	3.0 km	MPC · JPL
758444	2006 SK_{422}	—	October 7, 1999	Catalina	CSS	·	760 m	MPC · JPL
758445	2006 SL_{422}	—	September 17, 2006	Catalina	CSS	·	2.9 km	MPC · JPL
758446	2006 SF_{424}	—	September 30, 2006	Mount Lemmon	Mount Lemmon Survey	·	540 m	MPC · JPL
758447	2006 ST_{424}	—	September 20, 2006	Anderson Mesa	LONEOS	·	1.5 km	MPC · JPL
758448	2006 SV_{427}	—	September 25, 1995	Kitt Peak	Spacewatch	EUP	2.9 km	MPC · JPL
758449	2006 SF_{429}	—	September 27, 2006	Catalina	CSS	·	1.3 km	MPC · JPL
758450	2006 SP_{429}	—	September 19, 2012	Mount Lemmon	Mount Lemmon Survey	·	2.2 km	MPC · JPL
758451	2006 SH_{430}	—	September 17, 2006	Kitt Peak	Spacewatch	·	650 m	MPC · JPL
758452	2006 SR_{430}	—	September 25, 2006	Kitt Peak	Spacewatch	·	960 m	MPC · JPL
758453	2006 SQ_{431}	—	August 18, 2006	Kitt Peak	Spacewatch	·	2.5 km	MPC · JPL
758454	2006 SJ_{433}	—	September 26, 2006	Mount Lemmon	Mount Lemmon Survey	MIS	2.1 km	MPC · JPL
758455	2006 SV_{434}	—	September 30, 2006	Mount Lemmon	Mount Lemmon Survey	·	590 m	MPC · JPL
758456	2006 SE_{435}	—	September 17, 2006	Kitt Peak	Spacewatch	·	1.3 km	MPC · JPL
758457	2006 SK_{435}	—	September 18, 2006	Kitt Peak	Spacewatch	·	1.2 km	MPC · JPL
758458	2006 SR_{435}	—	September 28, 2006	Kitt Peak	Spacewatch	·	1.3 km	MPC · JPL
758459	2006 SA_{437}	—	July 5, 2016	Mount Lemmon	Mount Lemmon Survey	·	530 m	MPC · JPL
758460	2006 SD_{438}	—	September 26, 2006	Mount Lemmon	Mount Lemmon Survey	·	1.2 km	MPC · JPL
758461	2006 ST_{438}	—	April 1, 2014	Kitt Peak	Spacewatch	·	1.3 km	MPC · JPL
758462	2006 SK_{440}	—	September 30, 2006	Kitt Peak	Spacewatch	·	1.4 km	MPC · JPL
758463	2006 SQ_{440}	—	December 17, 2015	Mount Lemmon	Mount Lemmon Survey	JUN	820 m	MPC · JPL
758464	2006 SH_{441}	—	May 8, 2014	Haleakala	Pan-STARRS 1	·	1.2 km	MPC · JPL
758465	2006 SM_{441}	—	September 27, 2006	Kitt Peak	Spacewatch	·	560 m	MPC · JPL
758466	2006 SP_{441}	—	September 12, 2015	Haleakala	Pan-STARRS 1	·	1.4 km	MPC · JPL
758467	2006 SD_{442}	—	September 30, 2006	Mount Lemmon	Mount Lemmon Survey	·	1.3 km	MPC · JPL
758468	2006 SE_{444}	—	September 19, 2006	Kitt Peak	Spacewatch	·	2.5 km	MPC · JPL
758469	2006 SC_{445}	—	August 26, 2012	Haleakala	Pan-STARRS 1	·	2.1 km	MPC · JPL
758470	2006 SG_{445}	—	September 6, 2015	Kitt Peak	Spacewatch	·	1.4 km	MPC · JPL
758471	2006 SK_{445}	—	September 17, 2006	Kitt Peak	Spacewatch	·	1.1 km	MPC · JPL
758472	2006 SS_{445}	—	September 24, 2006	Kitt Peak	Spacewatch	·	2.1 km	MPC · JPL
758473	2006 SY_{446}	—	September 24, 2006	Kitt Peak	Spacewatch	·	630 m	MPC · JPL
758474	2006 SZ_{446}	—	September 26, 2006	Kitt Peak	Spacewatch	·	2.1 km	MPC · JPL
758475	2006 SB_{447}	—	September 28, 2006	Mount Lemmon	Mount Lemmon Survey	·	2.6 km	MPC · JPL
758476	2006 SP_{447}	—	September 25, 2006	Kitt Peak	Spacewatch	·	680 m	MPC · JPL
758477	2006 SU_{448}	—	September 20, 2006	Kitt Peak	Spacewatch	·	680 m	MPC · JPL
758478	2006 SP_{449}	—	September 25, 2006	Kitt Peak	Spacewatch	·	2.4 km	MPC · JPL
758479	2006 SG_{450}	—	September 19, 2006	Kitt Peak	Spacewatch	·	1.4 km	MPC · JPL
758480	2006 SX_{452}	—	September 19, 2006	Kitt Peak	Spacewatch	PAD	1.1 km	MPC · JPL
758481	2006 SS_{453}	—	September 17, 2006	Kitt Peak	Spacewatch	·	2.3 km	MPC · JPL
758482	2006 SM_{454}	—	September 17, 2006	Kitt Peak	Spacewatch	·	580 m	MPC · JPL
758483	2006 SG_{455}	—	September 17, 2006	Kitt Peak	Spacewatch	V	430 m	MPC · JPL
758484	2006 SP_{463}	—	September 26, 2006	Mount Lemmon	Mount Lemmon Survey	MAR	770 m	MPC · JPL
758485	2006 TM_{16}	—	September 28, 2006	Kitt Peak	Spacewatch	·	1.1 km	MPC · JPL
758486	2006 TW_{21}	—	September 26, 2006	Mount Lemmon	Mount Lemmon Survey	·	1.2 km	MPC · JPL
758487	2006 TT_{29}	—	September 30, 2006	Mount Lemmon	Mount Lemmon Survey	·	2.4 km	MPC · JPL
758488	2006 TD_{41}	—	September 25, 2006	Mount Lemmon	Mount Lemmon Survey	·	2.2 km	MPC · JPL
758489	2006 TV_{69}	—	October 2, 2006	Mount Lemmon	Mount Lemmon Survey	·	2.5 km	MPC · JPL
758490	2006 TW_{104}	—	October 15, 2006	Kitt Peak	Spacewatch	·	1.2 km	MPC · JPL
758491	2006 TP_{105}	—	October 15, 2006	Kitt Peak	Spacewatch	KOR	1.1 km	MPC · JPL
758492	2006 TJ_{107}	—	October 4, 2006	Mount Lemmon	Mount Lemmon Survey	·	600 m	MPC · JPL
758493	2006 TK_{111}	—	October 1, 2006	Apache Point	SDSS Collaboration	·	1.2 km	MPC · JPL
758494	2006 TF_{116}	—	September 11, 2006	Apache Point	SDSS Collaboration	·	2.0 km	MPC · JPL
758495	2006 TU_{117}	—	October 3, 2006	Apache Point	SDSS Collaboration	·	1.1 km	MPC · JPL
758496	2006 TG_{126}	—	October 2, 2006	Mount Lemmon	Mount Lemmon Survey	JUN	670 m	MPC · JPL
758497	2006 TA_{128}	—	October 13, 2006	Kitt Peak	Spacewatch	·	2.6 km	MPC · JPL
758498	2006 TS_{129}	—	October 4, 2006	Mount Lemmon	Mount Lemmon Survey	·	1.4 km	MPC · JPL
758499	2006 TR_{132}	—	October 2, 2006	Catalina	CSS	·	1.5 km	MPC · JPL
758500	2006 TE_{134}	—	October 2, 2006	Mount Lemmon	Mount Lemmon Survey	·	700 m	MPC · JPL

== 758501–758600 ==
back to top

Designation			Discovery			Properties		Ref
Permanent	Provisional	Named after	Date	Site	Discoverer(s)	Category	Diam.	Ref
758501	2006 TH_{136}	—	October 28, 2014	Haleakala	Pan-STARRS 1	·	960 m	MPC · JPL
758502	2006 TU_{137}	—	November 18, 2011	Mount Lemmon	Mount Lemmon Survey	HOF	1.8 km	MPC · JPL
758503	2006 TV_{138}	—	October 10, 2015	Haleakala	Pan-STARRS 1	·	1.2 km	MPC · JPL
758504	2006 TW_{138}	—	October 4, 2006	Mount Lemmon	Mount Lemmon Survey	·	1.3 km	MPC · JPL
758505	2006 TS_{143}	—	October 3, 2006	Mount Lemmon	Mount Lemmon Survey	·	1.5 km	MPC · JPL
758506	2006 TW_{146}	—	October 1, 2006	Kitt Peak	Spacewatch	·	2.3 km	MPC · JPL
758507	2006 UZ_{3}	—	October 2, 2006	Mount Lemmon	Mount Lemmon Survey	·	1.4 km	MPC · JPL
758508	2006 UU_{20}	—	October 16, 2006	Kitt Peak	Spacewatch	·	750 m	MPC · JPL
758509	2006 UM_{21}	—	September 25, 2006	Kitt Peak	Spacewatch	EUN	960 m	MPC · JPL
758510	2006 UZ_{22}	—	August 18, 2006	Kitt Peak	Spacewatch	THM	2.1 km	MPC · JPL
758511	2006 UW_{28}	—	October 4, 2006	Mount Lemmon	Mount Lemmon Survey	·	1.6 km	MPC · JPL
758512	2006 UP_{30}	—	October 16, 2006	Kitt Peak	Spacewatch	·	900 m	MPC · JPL
758513	2006 US_{40}	—	October 16, 2006	Kitt Peak	Spacewatch	·	1.3 km	MPC · JPL
758514	2006 UP_{41}	—	September 27, 2006	Mount Lemmon	Mount Lemmon Survey	·	730 m	MPC · JPL
758515	2006 UA_{46}	—	October 16, 2006	Kitt Peak	Spacewatch	·	710 m	MPC · JPL
758516	2006 US_{75}	—	September 27, 2006	Kitt Peak	Spacewatch	·	1.3 km	MPC · JPL
758517	2006 UA_{76}	—	October 2, 2006	Kitt Peak	Spacewatch	THM	2.0 km	MPC · JPL
758518	2006 UO_{94}	—	September 30, 2006	Mount Lemmon	Mount Lemmon Survey	·	3.1 km	MPC · JPL
758519	2006 UK_{97}	—	October 2, 2006	Mount Lemmon	Mount Lemmon Survey	·	1.2 km	MPC · JPL
758520	2006 UN_{101}	—	October 2, 2006	Mount Lemmon	Mount Lemmon Survey	·	810 m	MPC · JPL
758521	2006 UW_{110}	—	October 19, 2006	Kitt Peak	Spacewatch	HNS	780 m	MPC · JPL
758522	2006 UR_{112}	—	October 19, 2006	Kitt Peak	Spacewatch	·	640 m	MPC · JPL
758523	2006 UL_{115}	—	October 1, 2006	Kitt Peak	Spacewatch	V	450 m	MPC · JPL
758524	2006 UK_{116}	—	September 24, 2006	Kitt Peak	Spacewatch	·	2.3 km	MPC · JPL
758525	2006 UJ_{129}	—	October 19, 2006	Kitt Peak	Spacewatch	AGN	930 m	MPC · JPL
758526	2006 UK_{132}	—	September 26, 2006	Kitt Peak	Spacewatch	JUN	640 m	MPC · JPL
758527	2006 UY_{132}	—	September 30, 2006	Mount Lemmon	Mount Lemmon Survey	·	2.7 km	MPC · JPL
758528	2006 UE_{138}	—	October 4, 2006	Mount Lemmon	Mount Lemmon Survey	·	1.4 km	MPC · JPL
758529	2006 UF_{139}	—	October 4, 2006	Mount Lemmon	Mount Lemmon Survey	·	1.3 km	MPC · JPL
758530	2006 US_{147}	—	August 21, 2006	Kitt Peak	Spacewatch	·	1.2 km	MPC · JPL
758531	2006 UU_{151}	—	October 20, 2006	Mount Lemmon	Mount Lemmon Survey	PHO	620 m	MPC · JPL
758532	2006 US_{154}	—	October 4, 2006	Mount Lemmon	Mount Lemmon Survey	EUP	2.5 km	MPC · JPL
758533	2006 UF_{157}	—	October 2, 2006	Mount Lemmon	Mount Lemmon Survey	ADE	1.3 km	MPC · JPL
758534	2006 UK_{162}	—	October 21, 2006	Mount Lemmon	Mount Lemmon Survey	EOS	1.4 km	MPC · JPL
758535	2006 UT_{164}	—	October 21, 2006	Mount Lemmon	Mount Lemmon Survey	·	1.1 km	MPC · JPL
758536	2006 UH_{168}	—	October 21, 2006	Mount Lemmon	Mount Lemmon Survey	·	1.4 km	MPC · JPL
758537	2006 UH_{169}	—	October 3, 2006	Mount Lemmon	Mount Lemmon Survey	·	1.3 km	MPC · JPL
758538	2006 UL_{171}	—	October 21, 2006	Mount Lemmon	Mount Lemmon Survey	·	720 m	MPC · JPL
758539	2006 UB_{173}	—	October 2, 2006	Mount Lemmon	Mount Lemmon Survey	·	1.2 km	MPC · JPL
758540	2006 UH_{195}	—	October 20, 2006	Kitt Peak	Spacewatch	·	1.3 km	MPC · JPL
758541	2006 UY_{199}	—	September 14, 2006	Kitt Peak	Spacewatch	·	1.4 km	MPC · JPL
758542	2006 UE_{202}	—	September 30, 2006	Mount Lemmon	Mount Lemmon Survey	·	770 m	MPC · JPL
758543	2006 UB_{222}	—	September 22, 2006	Anderson Mesa	LONEOS	·	570 m	MPC · JPL
758544	2006 UJ_{227}	—	October 2, 2006	Mount Lemmon	Mount Lemmon Survey	·	1.3 km	MPC · JPL
758545	2006 UK_{244}	—	October 27, 2006	Mount Lemmon	Mount Lemmon Survey	·	560 m	MPC · JPL
758546	2006 UO_{248}	—	October 27, 2006	Mount Lemmon	Mount Lemmon Survey	V	500 m	MPC · JPL
758547	2006 UK_{264}	—	September 25, 2006	Kitt Peak	Spacewatch	HYG	2.4 km	MPC · JPL
758548	2006 UZ_{267}	—	October 27, 2006	Mount Lemmon	Mount Lemmon Survey	·	1.2 km	MPC · JPL
758549	2006 UZ_{274}	—	October 3, 2006	Kitt Peak	Spacewatch	·	1.3 km	MPC · JPL
758550	2006 UR_{276}	—	October 4, 2006	Mount Lemmon	Mount Lemmon Survey	·	1.3 km	MPC · JPL
758551	2006 UW_{277}	—	September 27, 2006	Mount Lemmon	Mount Lemmon Survey	·	510 m	MPC · JPL
758552	2006 UU_{278}	—	October 19, 2006	Kitt Peak	Spacewatch	·	1.1 km	MPC · JPL
758553	2006 UN_{289}	—	October 21, 2006	Kitt Peak	Spacewatch	HNS	960 m	MPC · JPL
758554	2006 UJ_{293}	—	October 19, 2006	Kitt Peak	Deep Ecliptic Survey	·	2.3 km	MPC · JPL
758555	2006 UD_{294}	—	October 19, 2006	Kitt Peak	Deep Ecliptic Survey	·	1 km	MPC · JPL
758556	2006 UL_{294}	—	October 19, 2006	Kitt Peak	Deep Ecliptic Survey	·	2.2 km	MPC · JPL
758557	2006 UV_{307}	—	September 26, 2006	Mount Lemmon	Mount Lemmon Survey	·	1.1 km	MPC · JPL
758558	2006 UJ_{322}	—	September 25, 2006	Kitt Peak	Spacewatch	·	1.8 km	MPC · JPL
758559	2006 UQ_{323}	—	October 21, 2006	Mount Lemmon	Mount Lemmon Survey	·	2.3 km	MPC · JPL
758560	2006 UB_{331}	—	October 16, 2006	Apache Point	SDSS Collaboration	·	1.3 km	MPC · JPL
758561	2006 US_{338}	—	October 27, 2006	Mount Lemmon	Mount Lemmon Survey	·	2.0 km	MPC · JPL
758562	2006 UL_{339}	—	September 30, 2006	Mount Lemmon	Mount Lemmon Survey	·	2.6 km	MPC · JPL
758563	2006 UQ_{355}	—	October 21, 2006	Kitt Peak	Spacewatch	WIT	860 m	MPC · JPL
758564	2006 UU_{364}	—	October 22, 2006	Mount Lemmon	Mount Lemmon Survey	·	700 m	MPC · JPL
758565	2006 UC_{365}	—	October 23, 2006	Mount Lemmon	Mount Lemmon Survey	·	740 m	MPC · JPL
758566	2006 UL_{365}	—	October 27, 2006	Mount Lemmon	Mount Lemmon Survey	HYG	2.3 km	MPC · JPL
758567	2006 US_{365}	—	October 31, 2006	Mount Lemmon	Mount Lemmon Survey	·	1.9 km	MPC · JPL
758568	2006 UF_{368}	—	June 12, 2013	Haleakala	Pan-STARRS 1	·	1.1 km	MPC · JPL
758569	2006 UT_{368}	—	October 2, 2006	Kitt Peak	Spacewatch	·	1.6 km	MPC · JPL
758570	2006 UT_{369}	—	October 21, 2006	Mount Lemmon	Mount Lemmon Survey	EUN	850 m	MPC · JPL
758571	2006 UU_{370}	—	February 14, 2013	Kitt Peak	Spacewatch	EUN	870 m	MPC · JPL
758572	2006 UA_{373}	—	April 15, 2012	Haleakala	Pan-STARRS 1	·	910 m	MPC · JPL
758573	2006 UB_{373}	—	October 27, 2006	Catalina	CSS	·	1.3 km	MPC · JPL
758574	2006 UD_{373}	—	April 12, 2018	Haleakala	Pan-STARRS 1	H	320 m	MPC · JPL
758575	2006 UP_{373}	—	March 27, 2017	Haleakala	Pan-STARRS 1	·	1.2 km	MPC · JPL
758576	2006 UY_{373}	—	October 31, 2006	Mount Lemmon	Mount Lemmon Survey	H	350 m	MPC · JPL
758577	2006 UQ_{374}	—	October 16, 2006	Kitt Peak	Spacewatch	·	1.1 km	MPC · JPL
758578	2006 UU_{374}	—	October 22, 2006	Kitt Peak	Spacewatch	·	1.4 km	MPC · JPL
758579	2006 UF_{375}	—	October 21, 2006	Mount Lemmon	Mount Lemmon Survey	AEO	860 m	MPC · JPL
758580	2006 UG_{375}	—	September 23, 2006	Kitt Peak	Spacewatch	·	1.1 km	MPC · JPL
758581	2006 UN_{376}	—	October 13, 2006	Kitt Peak	Spacewatch	·	1.0 km	MPC · JPL
758582	2006 UU_{376}	—	September 9, 2013	Haleakala	Pan-STARRS 1	·	580 m	MPC · JPL
758583	2006 UH_{377}	—	October 21, 2006	Kitt Peak	Spacewatch	·	1.5 km	MPC · JPL
758584	2006 US_{377}	—	November 3, 2015	Mount Lemmon	Mount Lemmon Survey	·	1.3 km	MPC · JPL
758585	2006 UX_{377}	—	January 11, 2008	Kitt Peak	Spacewatch	·	1.1 km	MPC · JPL
758586	2006 UB_{378}	—	December 5, 2010	Mount Lemmon	Mount Lemmon Survey	·	780 m	MPC · JPL
758587	2006 UC_{378}	—	October 19, 2006	Kitt Peak	Spacewatch	·	1.4 km	MPC · JPL
758588	2006 UO_{378}	—	January 11, 2008	Mount Lemmon	Mount Lemmon Survey	·	1.5 km	MPC · JPL
758589	2006 UE_{379}	—	October 21, 2006	Mount Lemmon	Mount Lemmon Survey	·	1.3 km	MPC · JPL
758590	2006 UC_{380}	—	October 23, 2006	Kitt Peak	Spacewatch	·	1.2 km	MPC · JPL
758591	2006 UT_{381}	—	October 21, 2006	Kitt Peak	Spacewatch	MAR	910 m	MPC · JPL
758592	2006 UA_{382}	—	October 17, 2006	Kitt Peak	Spacewatch	·	1.2 km	MPC · JPL
758593	2006 UW_{382}	—	October 21, 2006	Mount Lemmon	Mount Lemmon Survey	·	1.4 km	MPC · JPL
758594	2006 UZ_{383}	—	October 16, 2006	Kitt Peak	Spacewatch	EOS	1.2 km	MPC · JPL
758595	2006 UU_{384}	—	October 29, 2006	Kitt Peak	Spacewatch	·	1.2 km	MPC · JPL
758596	2006 UU_{390}	—	October 28, 2006	Mount Lemmon	Mount Lemmon Survey	·	1.4 km	MPC · JPL
758597	2006 UD_{393}	—	October 19, 2006	Kitt Peak	Spacewatch	EOS	1.3 km	MPC · JPL
758598	2006 UX_{393}	—	October 19, 2006	Kitt Peak	Spacewatch	·	680 m	MPC · JPL
758599	2006 UB_{394}	—	October 20, 2006	Kitt Peak	Spacewatch	·	1.7 km	MPC · JPL
758600	2006 US_{394}	—	October 27, 2006	Mount Lemmon	Mount Lemmon Survey	·	1.1 km	MPC · JPL

== 758601–758700 ==
back to top

Designation			Discovery			Properties		Ref
Permanent	Provisional	Named after	Date	Site	Discoverer(s)	Category	Diam.	Ref
758601	2006 VG_{15}	—	October 19, 2006	Kitt Peak	Spacewatch	·	2.0 km	MPC · JPL
758602	2006 VP_{18}	—	November 9, 2006	Kitt Peak	Spacewatch	·	1.4 km	MPC · JPL
758603	2006 VG_{21}	—	November 10, 2006	Kitt Peak	Spacewatch	·	1.2 km	MPC · JPL
758604	2006 VK_{22}	—	October 19, 2006	Mount Lemmon	Mount Lemmon Survey	·	1.1 km	MPC · JPL
758605	2006 VO_{23}	—	November 10, 2006	Kitt Peak	Spacewatch	·	680 m	MPC · JPL
758606	2006 VC_{30}	—	September 28, 2006	Mount Lemmon	Mount Lemmon Survey	·	1.3 km	MPC · JPL
758607	2006 VG_{32}	—	November 1, 2006	Mount Lemmon	Mount Lemmon Survey	·	1.6 km	MPC · JPL
758608	2006 VM_{33}	—	November 11, 2006	Mount Lemmon	Mount Lemmon Survey	·	2.4 km	MPC · JPL
758609	2006 VS_{37}	—	November 11, 2006	Catalina	CSS	·	1.1 km	MPC · JPL
758610	2006 VU_{38}	—	October 20, 2006	Kitt Peak	Spacewatch	·	1.2 km	MPC · JPL
758611	2006 VL_{41}	—	September 28, 2006	Mount Lemmon	Mount Lemmon Survey	·	520 m	MPC · JPL
758612	2006 VY_{42}	—	November 13, 2006	Kitt Peak	Spacewatch	·	1.0 km	MPC · JPL
758613	2006 VE_{47}	—	October 21, 2006	Kitt Peak	Spacewatch	·	1.2 km	MPC · JPL
758614	2006 VR_{57}	—	October 2, 2006	Mount Lemmon	Mount Lemmon Survey	·	3.1 km	MPC · JPL
758615	2006 VM_{71}	—	November 11, 2006	Mount Lemmon	Mount Lemmon Survey	·	1.4 km	MPC · JPL
758616	2006 VE_{76}	—	November 1, 2006	Kitt Peak	Spacewatch	NYS	580 m	MPC · JPL
758617	2006 VN_{82}	—	November 13, 2006	Kitt Peak	Spacewatch	·	1.1 km	MPC · JPL
758618	2006 VR_{85}	—	October 17, 2006	Mount Lemmon	Mount Lemmon Survey	·	1.4 km	MPC · JPL
758619	2006 VZ_{85}	—	October 20, 2006	Kitt Peak	Spacewatch	MAS	460 m	MPC · JPL
758620	2006 VO_{88}	—	September 18, 2001	Kitt Peak	Spacewatch	AGN	850 m	MPC · JPL
758621	2006 VK_{97}	—	November 11, 2006	Kitt Peak	Spacewatch	·	1.7 km	MPC · JPL
758622	2006 VG_{98}	—	October 21, 2006	Mount Lemmon	Mount Lemmon Survey	·	1.8 km	MPC · JPL
758623	2006 VP_{114}	—	November 14, 2006	Mount Lemmon	Mount Lemmon Survey	·	1.5 km	MPC · JPL
758624	2006 VN_{120}	—	November 14, 2006	Kitt Peak	Spacewatch	·	1.0 km	MPC · JPL
758625	2006 VP_{121}	—	October 21, 2006	Kitt Peak	Spacewatch	·	1.2 km	MPC · JPL
758626	2006 VJ_{126}	—	September 26, 2006	Mount Lemmon	Mount Lemmon Survey	·	490 m	MPC · JPL
758627	2006 VZ_{129}	—	October 19, 2006	Mount Lemmon	Mount Lemmon Survey	·	1.2 km	MPC · JPL
758628	2006 VO_{135}	—	November 15, 2006	Kitt Peak	Spacewatch	V	370 m	MPC · JPL
758629	2006 VM_{136}	—	November 15, 2006	Kitt Peak	Spacewatch	NEM	1.7 km	MPC · JPL
758630	2006 VO_{139}	—	October 21, 2006	Mount Lemmon	Mount Lemmon Survey	·	1.7 km	MPC · JPL
758631	2006 VU_{139}	—	November 15, 2006	Kitt Peak	Spacewatch	·	590 m	MPC · JPL
758632	2006 VE_{142}	—	November 14, 2006	Kitt Peak	Spacewatch	·	1.5 km	MPC · JPL
758633	2006 VJ_{175}	—	November 2, 2006	Mount Lemmon	Mount Lemmon Survey	·	1.1 km	MPC · JPL
758634	2006 VO_{178}	—	April 23, 2015	Haleakala	Pan-STARRS 1	·	2.9 km	MPC · JPL
758635	2006 VV_{178}	—	January 15, 2015	Haleakala	Pan-STARRS 1	·	920 m	MPC · JPL
758636	2006 VB_{179}	—	October 31, 2006	Kitt Peak	Spacewatch	HNS	1.1 km	MPC · JPL
758637	2006 VQ_{180}	—	October 1, 2011	Mount Lemmon	Mount Lemmon Survey	·	1.8 km	MPC · JPL
758638	2006 VY_{180}	—	September 26, 2006	Mount Lemmon	Mount Lemmon Survey	·	560 m	MPC · JPL
758639	2006 VA_{181}	—	May 23, 2014	Haleakala	Pan-STARRS 1	·	1.5 km	MPC · JPL
758640	2006 VG_{181}	—	January 1, 2014	Kitt Peak	Spacewatch	·	470 m	MPC · JPL
758641	2006 VV_{181}	—	September 12, 2010	Mount Lemmon	Mount Lemmon Survey	·	1.5 km	MPC · JPL
758642	2006 VY_{181}	—	November 14, 2006	Kitt Peak	Spacewatch	·	3.2 km	MPC · JPL
758643	2006 VE_{182}	—	November 1, 2006	Mount Lemmon	Mount Lemmon Survey	·	730 m	MPC · JPL
758644	2006 VY_{182}	—	November 12, 2006	Mount Lemmon	Mount Lemmon Survey	·	1.1 km	MPC · JPL
758645	2006 WN_{6}	—	November 16, 2006	Kitt Peak	Spacewatch	·	1.1 km	MPC · JPL
758646	2006 WS_{15}	—	November 17, 2006	Kitt Peak	Spacewatch	HNS	960 m	MPC · JPL
758647	2006 WZ_{37}	—	November 16, 2006	Kitt Peak	Spacewatch	MRX	760 m	MPC · JPL
758648	2006 WE_{40}	—	November 16, 2006	Kitt Peak	Spacewatch	·	2.3 km	MPC · JPL
758649	2006 WQ_{40}	—	November 16, 2006	Kitt Peak	Spacewatch	NEM	1.6 km	MPC · JPL
758650	2006 WQ_{46}	—	November 16, 2006	Kitt Peak	Spacewatch	·	620 m	MPC · JPL
758651	2006 WH_{50}	—	November 16, 2006	Mount Lemmon	Mount Lemmon Survey	·	3.1 km	MPC · JPL
758652	2006 WH_{62}	—	November 17, 2006	Mount Lemmon	Mount Lemmon Survey	·	2.3 km	MPC · JPL
758653	2006 WL_{69}	—	November 17, 2006	Mount Lemmon	Mount Lemmon Survey	·	1.3 km	MPC · JPL
758654	2006 WQ_{71}	—	October 23, 2006	Kitt Peak	Spacewatch	·	1.1 km	MPC · JPL
758655	2006 WH_{75}	—	October 27, 2006	Mount Lemmon	Mount Lemmon Survey	·	1.2 km	MPC · JPL
758656	2006 WP_{77}	—	November 18, 2006	Kitt Peak	Spacewatch	·	1.4 km	MPC · JPL
758657	2006 WN_{84}	—	November 18, 2006	Mount Lemmon	Mount Lemmon Survey	WIT	660 m	MPC · JPL
758658	2006 WY_{96}	—	November 19, 2006	Kitt Peak	Spacewatch	·	1.5 km	MPC · JPL
758659	2006 WC_{98}	—	November 11, 2006	Kitt Peak	Spacewatch	HNS	810 m	MPC · JPL
758660	2006 WS_{104}	—	November 19, 2006	Kitt Peak	Spacewatch	·	1.8 km	MPC · JPL
758661	2006 WW_{106}	—	November 1, 2006	Catalina	CSS	EUN	1.2 km	MPC · JPL
758662	2006 WR_{116}	—	November 20, 2006	Mount Lemmon	Mount Lemmon Survey	ERI	920 m	MPC · JPL
758663	2006 WS_{116}	—	November 20, 2006	Mount Lemmon	Mount Lemmon Survey	·	1.2 km	MPC · JPL
758664	2006 WV_{134}	—	November 18, 2006	Mount Lemmon	Mount Lemmon Survey	·	1.5 km	MPC · JPL
758665	2006 WX_{134}	—	September 30, 2006	Mount Lemmon	Mount Lemmon Survey	·	1.3 km	MPC · JPL
758666	2006 WB_{158}	—	November 22, 2006	Kitt Peak	Spacewatch	·	1.3 km	MPC · JPL
758667	2006 WR_{159}	—	November 22, 2006	Kitt Peak	Spacewatch	H	400 m	MPC · JPL
758668	2006 WH_{165}	—	November 23, 2006	Kitt Peak	Spacewatch	·	1.5 km	MPC · JPL
758669	2006 WR_{174}	—	November 23, 2006	Kitt Peak	Spacewatch	·	720 m	MPC · JPL
758670	2006 WC_{177}	—	October 3, 2006	Mount Lemmon	Mount Lemmon Survey	·	620 m	MPC · JPL
758671	2006 WY_{179}	—	November 24, 2006	Mount Lemmon	Mount Lemmon Survey	·	1.9 km	MPC · JPL
758672	2006 WJ_{197}	—	October 31, 2006	Mount Lemmon	Mount Lemmon Survey	JUN	900 m	MPC · JPL
758673	2006 WP_{200}	—	November 22, 2006	Kitt Peak	Spacewatch	AGN	900 m	MPC · JPL
758674	2006 WY_{202}	—	November 16, 2006	Kitt Peak	Spacewatch	·	1.6 km	MPC · JPL
758675	2006 WY_{213}	—	September 15, 2013	Haleakala	Pan-STARRS 1	MAS	540 m	MPC · JPL
758676	2006 WO_{214}	—	November 16, 2006	Kitt Peak	Spacewatch	·	570 m	MPC · JPL
758677	2006 WP_{214}	—	September 17, 2010	Mount Lemmon	Mount Lemmon Survey	·	1.3 km	MPC · JPL
758678	2006 WT_{214}	—	November 20, 2006	Kitt Peak	Spacewatch	·	1.1 km	MPC · JPL
758679	2006 WD_{215}	—	March 1, 2011	Mount Lemmon	Mount Lemmon Survey	·	560 m	MPC · JPL
758680	2006 WP_{218}	—	November 13, 2006	Kitt Peak	Spacewatch	·	1.6 km	MPC · JPL
758681	2006 WV_{218}	—	November 16, 2006	Mount Lemmon	Mount Lemmon Survey	·	1.2 km	MPC · JPL
758682	2006 WD_{219}	—	September 4, 2010	Mount Lemmon	Mount Lemmon Survey	·	1.5 km	MPC · JPL
758683	2006 WE_{219}	—	April 15, 2013	Haleakala	Pan-STARRS 1	HNS	850 m	MPC · JPL
758684	2006 WG_{219}	—	October 15, 2015	Haleakala	Pan-STARRS 1	·	1.6 km	MPC · JPL
758685	2006 WV_{219}	—	July 1, 2014	Haleakala	Pan-STARRS 1	(12739)	1.3 km	MPC · JPL
758686	2006 WT_{220}	—	March 17, 2018	Haleakala	Pan-STARRS 1	·	560 m	MPC · JPL
758687	2006 WR_{221}	—	January 6, 2013	Kitt Peak	Spacewatch	·	1.9 km	MPC · JPL
758688	2006 WU_{221}	—	September 26, 2017	Mount Lemmon	Mount Lemmon Survey	·	2.4 km	MPC · JPL
758689	2006 WY_{221}	—	September 23, 2015	Haleakala	Pan-STARRS 1	·	1.3 km	MPC · JPL
758690	2006 WU_{222}	—	November 20, 2006	Kitt Peak	Spacewatch	H	380 m	MPC · JPL
758691	2006 WS_{223}	—	August 13, 2010	Kitt Peak	Spacewatch	·	1.0 km	MPC · JPL
758692	2006 WV_{223}	—	November 25, 2006	Kitt Peak	Spacewatch	MAS	500 m	MPC · JPL
758693	2006 WD_{224}	—	December 27, 2011	Mount Lemmon	Mount Lemmon Survey	·	1.3 km	MPC · JPL
758694	2006 WE_{224}	—	November 17, 2006	Kitt Peak	Spacewatch	·	1.3 km	MPC · JPL
758695	2006 WJ_{224}	—	May 25, 2014	Haleakala	Pan-STARRS 1	·	1.5 km	MPC · JPL
758696	2006 WD_{225}	—	October 3, 2015	Mount Lemmon	Mount Lemmon Survey	·	1.5 km	MPC · JPL
758697	2006 WQ_{226}	—	September 19, 2010	Kitt Peak	Spacewatch	·	1.0 km	MPC · JPL
758698	2006 WR_{226}	—	November 23, 2006	Kitt Peak	Spacewatch	VER	2.1 km	MPC · JPL
758699	2006 WT_{226}	—	August 9, 2005	Cerro Tololo	Deep Ecliptic Survey	NYS	820 m	MPC · JPL
758700	2006 WX_{227}	—	September 30, 2010	Mount Lemmon	Mount Lemmon Survey	ADE	1.3 km	MPC · JPL

== 758701–758800 ==
back to top

Designation			Discovery			Properties		Ref
Permanent	Provisional	Named after	Date	Site	Discoverer(s)	Category	Diam.	Ref
758701	2006 WG_{228}	—	November 18, 2006	Kitt Peak	Spacewatch	·	650 m	MPC · JPL
758702	2006 WJ_{228}	—	June 29, 2014	Mount Lemmon	Mount Lemmon Survey	·	1.3 km	MPC · JPL
758703	2006 WY_{228}	—	January 2, 2012	Kitt Peak	Spacewatch	·	1.2 km	MPC · JPL
758704	2006 WQ_{229}	—	November 17, 2006	Kitt Peak	Spacewatch	·	2.3 km	MPC · JPL
758705	2006 WE_{230}	—	November 17, 2006	Mount Lemmon	Mount Lemmon Survey	EUN	1.0 km	MPC · JPL
758706	2006 WQ_{230}	—	November 27, 2006	Kitt Peak	Spacewatch	·	2.5 km	MPC · JPL
758707	2006 WP_{231}	—	November 20, 2006	Kitt Peak	Spacewatch	MAS	460 m	MPC · JPL
758708	2006 WY_{231}	—	November 22, 2006	Kitt Peak	Spacewatch	·	1.3 km	MPC · JPL
758709	2006 WJ_{232}	—	November 17, 2006	Kitt Peak	Spacewatch	AGN	840 m	MPC · JPL
758710	2006 WY_{232}	—	November 17, 2006	Mount Lemmon	Mount Lemmon Survey	·	580 m	MPC · JPL
758711	2006 WT_{233}	—	November 21, 2006	Mount Lemmon	Mount Lemmon Survey	·	590 m	MPC · JPL
758712	2006 WR_{235}	—	November 17, 2006	Mount Lemmon	Mount Lemmon Survey	EOS	1.4 km	MPC · JPL
758713	2006 XS_{12}	—	November 26, 2006	Kitt Peak	Spacewatch	H	410 m	MPC · JPL
758714	2006 XO_{37}	—	November 17, 2006	Mount Lemmon	Mount Lemmon Survey	·	1.3 km	MPC · JPL
758715	2006 XU_{40}	—	December 12, 2006	Kitt Peak	Spacewatch	·	800 m	MPC · JPL
758716	2006 XY_{40}	—	January 28, 2017	Haleakala	Pan-STARRS 1	·	1.5 km	MPC · JPL
758717	2006 XH_{44}	—	December 13, 2006	Kitt Peak	Spacewatch	·	1.3 km	MPC · JPL
758718	2006 XD_{46}	—	December 13, 2006	Mount Lemmon	Mount Lemmon Survey	·	1.8 km	MPC · JPL
758719	2006 XD_{63}	—	November 16, 2006	Kitt Peak	Spacewatch	·	2.0 km	MPC · JPL
758720	2006 XE_{70}	—	December 13, 2006	Mount Lemmon	Mount Lemmon Survey	AEO	810 m	MPC · JPL
758721	2006 XU_{74}	—	May 27, 2014	Haleakala	Pan-STARRS 1	·	1.9 km	MPC · JPL
758722	2006 XK_{76}	—	November 11, 2013	Kitt Peak	Spacewatch	·	680 m	MPC · JPL
758723	2006 XP_{76}	—	December 13, 2006	Mount Lemmon	Mount Lemmon Survey	·	1.0 km	MPC · JPL
758724	2006 XS_{77}	—	December 25, 2017	Mount Lemmon	Mount Lemmon Survey	PHO	620 m	MPC · JPL
758725	2006 XS_{78}	—	July 13, 2016	Haleakala	Pan-STARRS 1	(3025)	3.1 km	MPC · JPL
758726	2006 XB_{79}	—	March 6, 2008	Mount Lemmon	Mount Lemmon Survey	·	1.4 km	MPC · JPL
758727	2006 XS_{81}	—	December 13, 2006	Mount Lemmon	Mount Lemmon Survey	·	740 m	MPC · JPL
758728	2006 YV_{12}	—	November 20, 2006	Kitt Peak	Spacewatch	·	1.2 km	MPC · JPL
758729	2006 YN_{20}	—	October 23, 2006	Mount Lemmon	Mount Lemmon Survey	·	2.7 km	MPC · JPL
758730	2006 YT_{22}	—	December 21, 2006	Kitt Peak	Spacewatch	MRX	760 m	MPC · JPL
758731	2006 YM_{25}	—	December 21, 2006	Kitt Peak	Spacewatch	·	770 m	MPC · JPL
758732	2006 YW_{29}	—	December 21, 2006	Kitt Peak	Spacewatch	AEO	770 m	MPC · JPL
758733	2006 YC_{46}	—	December 21, 2006	Mount Lemmon	Mount Lemmon Survey	·	1.5 km	MPC · JPL
758734	2006 YJ_{54}	—	December 21, 2006	Kitt Peak	L. H. Wasserman, M. W. Buie	·	1.1 km	MPC · JPL
758735	2006 YP_{56}	—	December 27, 2006	Mount Lemmon	Mount Lemmon Survey	GAL	1.2 km	MPC · JPL
758736	2006 YT_{58}	—	November 20, 2006	Mount Lemmon	Mount Lemmon Survey	EUP	2.1 km	MPC · JPL
758737	2006 YQ_{60}	—	February 28, 2012	Haleakala	Pan-STARRS 1	·	1.2 km	MPC · JPL
758738	2006 YJ_{61}	—	December 24, 2006	Mount Lemmon	Mount Lemmon Survey	T_{j} (2.95)	3.8 km	MPC · JPL
758739	2006 YT_{62}	—	June 6, 2018	Haleakala	Pan-STARRS 1	EUN	1.0 km	MPC · JPL
758740	2006 YU_{62}	—	October 12, 2010	Mount Lemmon	Mount Lemmon Survey	AGN	930 m	MPC · JPL
758741	2006 YB_{63}	—	June 24, 2017	Haleakala	Pan-STARRS 1	·	2.9 km	MPC · JPL
758742	2006 YG_{63}	—	December 26, 2006	Kitt Peak	Spacewatch	·	1.5 km	MPC · JPL
758743	2006 YG_{64}	—	May 2, 2014	Cerro Tololo-DECam	DECam	·	2.3 km	MPC · JPL
758744	2006 YA_{67}	—	December 24, 2006	Kitt Peak	Spacewatch	NYS	760 m	MPC · JPL
758745	2006 YH_{67}	—	December 27, 2006	Mount Lemmon	Mount Lemmon Survey	·	1.2 km	MPC · JPL
758746	2006 YX_{67}	—	December 16, 2006	Kitt Peak	Spacewatch	·	760 m	MPC · JPL
758747	2006 YX_{69}	—	December 27, 2006	Mount Lemmon	Mount Lemmon Survey	T_{j} (2.98)	2.3 km	MPC · JPL
758748	2007 AT_{4}	—	December 15, 2006	Kitt Peak	Spacewatch	·	670 m	MPC · JPL
758749	2007 AT_{20}	—	January 10, 2007	Kitt Peak	Spacewatch	·	1.3 km	MPC · JPL
758750	2007 AD_{24}	—	January 10, 2007	Mount Lemmon	Mount Lemmon Survey	·	2.1 km	MPC · JPL
758751	2007 AF_{30}	—	January 10, 2007	Mount Lemmon	Mount Lemmon Survey	·	940 m	MPC · JPL
758752	2007 AO_{33}	—	November 7, 2015	Mount Lemmon	Mount Lemmon Survey	·	1.5 km	MPC · JPL
758753	2007 AA_{34}	—	April 3, 2011	Haleakala	Pan-STARRS 1	NYS	710 m	MPC · JPL
758754	2007 AD_{35}	—	October 26, 2013	Kitt Peak	Spacewatch	·	700 m	MPC · JPL
758755	2007 AY_{36}	—	January 10, 2007	Kitt Peak	Spacewatch	·	800 m	MPC · JPL
758756	2007 AC_{37}	—	April 4, 2017	Haleakala	Pan-STARRS 1	·	1.5 km	MPC · JPL
758757	2007 AJ_{37}	—	January 10, 2007	Mount Lemmon	Mount Lemmon Survey	·	1.3 km	MPC · JPL
758758	2007 BA_{28}	—	January 24, 2007	Mount Lemmon	Mount Lemmon Survey	·	1.2 km	MPC · JPL
758759	2007 BK_{45}	—	January 25, 2007	Kitt Peak	Spacewatch	·	1.1 km	MPC · JPL
758760	2007 BR_{46}	—	January 26, 2007	Kitt Peak	Spacewatch	·	1.5 km	MPC · JPL
758761	2007 BF_{49}	—	January 27, 2007	Mount Lemmon	Mount Lemmon Survey	·	260 m	MPC · JPL
758762	2007 BH_{51}	—	January 24, 2007	Kitt Peak	Spacewatch	NYS	880 m	MPC · JPL
758763	2007 BD_{52}	—	January 24, 2007	Kitt Peak	Spacewatch	AGN	1.0 km	MPC · JPL
758764	2007 BV_{53}	—	January 24, 2007	Kitt Peak	Spacewatch	·	1.4 km	MPC · JPL
758765	2007 BY_{54}	—	January 24, 2007	Mount Lemmon	Mount Lemmon Survey	·	1.7 km	MPC · JPL
758766	2007 BY_{59}	—	January 15, 2007	Catalina	CSS	·	1.4 km	MPC · JPL
758767	2007 BR_{63}	—	January 27, 2007	Mount Lemmon	Mount Lemmon Survey	·	1.0 km	MPC · JPL
758768	2007 BT_{94}	—	January 27, 2007	Kitt Peak	Spacewatch	·	1.2 km	MPC · JPL
758769	2007 BS_{95}	—	January 27, 2007	Kitt Peak	Spacewatch	·	1.6 km	MPC · JPL
758770	2007 BE_{97}	—	January 19, 2007	Mauna Kea	P. A. Wiegert	·	1.4 km	MPC · JPL
758771	2007 BZ_{98}	—	January 19, 2007	Mauna Kea	P. A. Wiegert	·	1.4 km	MPC · JPL
758772	2007 BA_{99}	—	January 19, 2007	Mauna Kea	P. A. Wiegert	KOR	920 m	MPC · JPL
758773	2007 BG_{106}	—	January 17, 2007	Kitt Peak	Spacewatch	·	760 m	MPC · JPL
758774	2007 BV_{106}	—	January 27, 2007	Kitt Peak	Spacewatch	·	860 m	MPC · JPL
758775	2007 BB_{108}	—	March 14, 2011	Mount Lemmon	Mount Lemmon Survey	NYS	760 m	MPC · JPL
758776	2007 BO_{110}	—	August 3, 2014	Haleakala	Pan-STARRS 1	·	1.4 km	MPC · JPL
758777	2007 BQ_{110}	—	May 29, 2017	Haleakala	Pan-STARRS 1	BAR	910 m	MPC · JPL
758778	2007 BR_{110}	—	January 28, 2007	Kitt Peak	Spacewatch	·	980 m	MPC · JPL
758779	2007 BU_{110}	—	December 25, 2006	Kitt Peak	Spacewatch	·	1.4 km	MPC · JPL
758780	2007 BY_{110}	—	November 27, 2013	Haleakala	Pan-STARRS 1	·	810 m	MPC · JPL
758781	2007 BG_{111}	—	January 24, 2007	Mount Lemmon	Mount Lemmon Survey	·	1.5 km	MPC · JPL
758782	2007 BD_{112}	—	January 7, 2016	Haleakala	Pan-STARRS 1	·	1.3 km	MPC · JPL
758783	2007 BE_{112}	—	April 2, 2011	Kitt Peak	Spacewatch	·	760 m	MPC · JPL
758784	2007 BQ_{112}	—	April 13, 2011	Kitt Peak	Spacewatch	MAS	470 m	MPC · JPL
758785	2007 BT_{112}	—	December 18, 2015	Mount Lemmon	Mount Lemmon Survey	AEO	820 m	MPC · JPL
758786	2007 BC_{113}	—	October 26, 2013	Kitt Peak	Spacewatch	MAS	520 m	MPC · JPL
758787	2007 BY_{113}	—	March 25, 2017	Mount Lemmon	Mount Lemmon Survey	·	1.5 km	MPC · JPL
758788	2007 BM_{114}	—	January 17, 2007	Kitt Peak	Spacewatch	·	530 m	MPC · JPL
758789	2007 BP_{117}	—	January 17, 2007	Kitt Peak	Spacewatch	·	670 m	MPC · JPL
758790	2007 BF_{118}	—	December 26, 2006	Catalina	CSS	·	1.6 km	MPC · JPL
758791	2007 BR_{118}	—	January 17, 2007	Kitt Peak	Spacewatch	THM	1.7 km	MPC · JPL
758792	2007 BY_{119}	—	January 28, 2007	Mount Lemmon	Mount Lemmon Survey	MAS	550 m	MPC · JPL
758793	2007 BZ_{119}	—	January 24, 2007	Mount Lemmon	Mount Lemmon Survey	·	800 m	MPC · JPL
758794	2007 BH_{122}	—	December 27, 2006	Mount Lemmon	Mount Lemmon Survey	·	1.3 km	MPC · JPL
758795	2007 CJ_{2}	—	February 6, 2007	Mount Lemmon	Mount Lemmon Survey	(18466)	1.8 km	MPC · JPL
758796	2007 CX_{9}	—	December 21, 2006	Mount Lemmon	Mount Lemmon Survey	·	1.4 km	MPC · JPL
758797	2007 CK_{11}	—	January 17, 2007	Kitt Peak	Spacewatch	·	1.1 km	MPC · JPL
758798	2007 CY_{29}	—	December 21, 2006	Kitt Peak	L. H. Wasserman, M. W. Buie	·	990 m	MPC · JPL
758799	2007 CM_{31}	—	February 6, 2007	Mount Lemmon	Mount Lemmon Survey	·	1.6 km	MPC · JPL
758800	2007 CK_{32}	—	January 10, 2007	Mount Lemmon	Mount Lemmon Survey	·	950 m	MPC · JPL

== 758801–758900 ==
back to top

Designation			Discovery			Properties		Ref
Permanent	Provisional	Named after	Date	Site	Discoverer(s)	Category	Diam.	Ref
758801	2007 CV_{32}	—	January 27, 2007	Mount Lemmon	Mount Lemmon Survey	MRX	690 m	MPC · JPL
758802	2007 CP_{39}	—	February 6, 2007	Mount Lemmon	Mount Lemmon Survey	MAS	430 m	MPC · JPL
758803	2007 CW_{49}	—	February 10, 2007	Mount Lemmon	Mount Lemmon Survey	·	1.4 km	MPC · JPL
758804	2007 CC_{72}	—	February 14, 2007	Mauna Kea	P. A. Wiegert	·	1.4 km	MPC · JPL
758805	2007 CS_{80}	—	February 10, 2007	Mount Lemmon	Mount Lemmon Survey	·	780 m	MPC · JPL
758806	2007 CL_{81}	—	September 6, 2016	Mount Lemmon	Mount Lemmon Survey	·	2.1 km	MPC · JPL
758807	2007 CU_{81}	—	September 19, 2011	Haleakala	Pan-STARRS 1	·	2.6 km	MPC · JPL
758808	2007 CA_{83}	—	September 25, 2016	Haleakala	Pan-STARRS 1	VER	2.1 km	MPC · JPL
758809	2007 CL_{83}	—	October 25, 2013	Kitt Peak	Spacewatch	·	780 m	MPC · JPL
758810	2007 CN_{83}	—	February 8, 2007	Kitt Peak	Spacewatch	NYS	790 m	MPC · JPL
758811	2007 CG_{84}	—	February 10, 2007	Mount Lemmon	Mount Lemmon Survey	·	1.1 km	MPC · JPL
758812	2007 CE_{85}	—	February 8, 2007	Mount Lemmon	Mount Lemmon Survey	·	1.7 km	MPC · JPL
758813	2007 CG_{87}	—	February 8, 2007	Kitt Peak	Spacewatch	·	1.6 km	MPC · JPL
758814	2007 DV_{5}	—	January 27, 2007	Kitt Peak	Spacewatch	NYS	750 m	MPC · JPL
758815	2007 DN_{15}	—	February 17, 2007	Kitt Peak	Spacewatch	·	880 m	MPC · JPL
758816	2007 DO_{26}	—	January 29, 2003	Apache Point	SDSS	MAS	530 m	MPC · JPL
758817	2007 DA_{32}	—	February 17, 2007	Kitt Peak	Spacewatch	NYS	950 m	MPC · JPL
758818	2007 DF_{40}	—	January 28, 2007	Mount Lemmon	Mount Lemmon Survey	PHO	510 m	MPC · JPL
758819	2007 DZ_{51}	—	February 17, 2007	Mount Lemmon	Mount Lemmon Survey	·	1.8 km	MPC · JPL
758820	2007 DC_{61}	—	February 19, 2007	Farra d'Isonzo	Lombardi, G., Pettarin, E.	·	910 m	MPC · JPL
758821	2007 DE_{62}	—	February 16, 2007	Catalina	CSS	JUN	960 m	MPC · JPL
758822	2007 DL_{66}	—	February 21, 2007	Kitt Peak	Spacewatch	DOR	1.5 km	MPC · JPL
758823	2007 DP_{71}	—	February 21, 2007	Kitt Peak	Spacewatch	·	850 m	MPC · JPL
758824	2007 DF_{73}	—	February 21, 2007	Kitt Peak	Spacewatch	·	780 m	MPC · JPL
758825	2007 DX_{75}	—	February 21, 2007	Mount Lemmon	Mount Lemmon Survey	·	1.4 km	MPC · JPL
758826	2007 DF_{87}	—	February 23, 2007	Kitt Peak	Spacewatch	·	690 m	MPC · JPL
758827	2007 DX_{99}	—	September 29, 2005	Mount Lemmon	Mount Lemmon Survey	(21344)	1.4 km	MPC · JPL
758828	2007 DR_{100}	—	February 25, 2007	Kitt Peak	Spacewatch	·	1.1 km	MPC · JPL
758829	2007 DL_{103}	—	February 25, 2007	Kitt Peak	Spacewatch	·	2.7 km	MPC · JPL
758830	2007 DE_{107}	—	February 21, 2007	Mount Lemmon	Mount Lemmon Survey	·	1.3 km	MPC · JPL
758831	2007 DP_{110}	—	February 19, 2007	Mount Lemmon	Mount Lemmon Survey	·	1.4 km	MPC · JPL
758832	2007 DG_{111}	—	February 23, 2007	Kitt Peak	Spacewatch	EOS	1.5 km	MPC · JPL
758833	2007 DM_{117}	—	February 25, 2007	Mount Lemmon	Mount Lemmon Survey	·	1.0 km	MPC · JPL
758834	2007 DL_{119}	—	February 23, 2007	Mount Lemmon	Mount Lemmon Survey	EUP	2.1 km	MPC · JPL
758835	2007 DF_{121}	—	February 26, 2007	Mount Lemmon	Mount Lemmon Survey	·	1.0 km	MPC · JPL
758836	2007 DR_{121}	—	February 21, 2007	Kitt Peak	Spacewatch	·	860 m	MPC · JPL
758837	2007 DS_{121}	—	August 28, 2016	Mount Lemmon	Mount Lemmon Survey	·	790 m	MPC · JPL
758838	2007 DL_{123}	—	February 21, 2007	Mount Lemmon	Mount Lemmon Survey	·	860 m	MPC · JPL
758839	2007 DS_{123}	—	February 21, 2007	Mount Lemmon	Mount Lemmon Survey	·	920 m	MPC · JPL
758840	2007 DY_{123}	—	April 3, 2011	Haleakala	Pan-STARRS 1	·	870 m	MPC · JPL
758841	2007 DH_{124}	—	March 25, 2011	Kitt Peak	Spacewatch	·	930 m	MPC · JPL
758842	2007 DM_{124}	—	February 21, 2007	Mount Lemmon	Mount Lemmon Survey	BRA	1.3 km	MPC · JPL
758843	2007 DF_{125}	—	September 17, 2014	Haleakala	Pan-STARRS 1	·	1.4 km	MPC · JPL
758844	2007 DK_{125}	—	February 3, 2016	Haleakala	Pan-STARRS 1	·	1.9 km	MPC · JPL
758845	2007 DM_{125}	—	September 14, 2014	Kitt Peak	Spacewatch	AGN	960 m	MPC · JPL
758846	2007 DE_{126}	—	October 18, 2009	Mount Lemmon	Mount Lemmon Survey	NYS	740 m	MPC · JPL
758847	2007 DS_{126}	—	February 17, 2007	Kitt Peak	Spacewatch	·	1.3 km	MPC · JPL
758848	2007 DS_{127}	—	February 21, 2007	Kitt Peak	Spacewatch	·	650 m	MPC · JPL
758849	2007 DQ_{128}	—	February 26, 2007	Mount Lemmon	Mount Lemmon Survey	·	1.3 km	MPC · JPL
758850	2007 DC_{129}	—	February 21, 2007	Mount Lemmon	Mount Lemmon Survey	·	1.5 km	MPC · JPL
758851	2007 DK_{129}	—	February 23, 2007	Kitt Peak	Spacewatch	·	580 m	MPC · JPL
758852	2007 DS_{130}	—	February 23, 2007	Kitt Peak	Spacewatch	DOR	1.2 km	MPC · JPL
758853	2007 DC_{131}	—	January 26, 2007	Kitt Peak	Spacewatch	DOR	1.4 km	MPC · JPL
758854	2007 DE_{132}	—	February 27, 2007	Kitt Peak	Spacewatch	EUP	2.7 km	MPC · JPL
758855	2007 DU_{132}	—	February 25, 2007	Kitt Peak	Spacewatch	·	1 km	MPC · JPL
758856	2007 DB_{134}	—	February 21, 2007	Kitt Peak	Spacewatch	·	1.7 km	MPC · JPL
758857	2007 EC_{4}	—	February 27, 2007	Kitt Peak	Spacewatch	NYS	980 m	MPC · JPL
758858	2007 ED_{6}	—	February 16, 2007	Mount Lemmon	Mount Lemmon Survey	·	1.3 km	MPC · JPL
758859	2007 ER_{25}	—	March 10, 2007	Mount Lemmon	Mount Lemmon Survey	MAS	540 m	MPC · JPL
758860	2007 EA_{38}	—	March 11, 2007	Mount Lemmon	Mount Lemmon Survey	·	1.8 km	MPC · JPL
758861	2007 EL_{59}	—	February 21, 2007	Mount Lemmon	Mount Lemmon Survey	KOR	1.1 km	MPC · JPL
758862	2007 EC_{61}	—	March 10, 2007	Kitt Peak	Spacewatch	NYS	910 m	MPC · JPL
758863	2007 EZ_{61}	—	March 10, 2007	Mount Lemmon	Mount Lemmon Survey	NYS	790 m	MPC · JPL
758864	2007 EY_{63}	—	February 6, 2007	Mount Lemmon	Mount Lemmon Survey	NYS	910 m	MPC · JPL
758865	2007 EH_{73}	—	February 25, 2007	Kitt Peak	Spacewatch	·	990 m	MPC · JPL
758866	2007 EQ_{107}	—	March 11, 2007	Kitt Peak	Spacewatch	·	1.5 km	MPC · JPL
758867	2007 EW_{124}	—	March 14, 2007	Kitt Peak	Spacewatch	CLA	1.3 km	MPC · JPL
758868	2007 EQ_{132}	—	March 9, 2007	Mount Lemmon	Mount Lemmon Survey	·	820 m	MPC · JPL
758869	2007 ET_{135}	—	March 10, 2007	Mount Lemmon	Mount Lemmon Survey	·	890 m	MPC · JPL
758870	2007 EG_{140}	—	February 23, 2007	Mount Lemmon	Mount Lemmon Survey	AGN	840 m	MPC · JPL
758871	2007 ER_{157}	—	January 27, 2007	Mount Lemmon	Mount Lemmon Survey	·	850 m	MPC · JPL
758872	2007 EE_{193}	—	February 25, 2007	Mount Lemmon	Mount Lemmon Survey	·	1.5 km	MPC · JPL
758873	2007 ET_{194}	—	March 15, 2007	Kitt Peak	Spacewatch	·	1.3 km	MPC · JPL
758874	2007 EK_{218}	—	March 10, 2007	Mount Lemmon	Mount Lemmon Survey	NYS	790 m	MPC · JPL
758875	2007 EX_{223}	—	March 13, 2007	Mount Lemmon	Mount Lemmon Survey	NYS	870 m	MPC · JPL
758876	2007 EY_{226}	—	March 11, 2007	Mount Lemmon	Mount Lemmon Survey	NYS	1.0 km	MPC · JPL
758877	2007 EJ_{229}	—	March 2, 2011	Mount Lemmon	Mount Lemmon Survey	·	950 m	MPC · JPL
758878	2007 ES_{229}	—	March 28, 2012	Mount Lemmon	Mount Lemmon Survey	·	1.8 km	MPC · JPL
758879	2007 EU_{229}	—	May 21, 2011	Kitt Peak	Spacewatch	NYS	900 m	MPC · JPL
758880	2007 EB_{230}	—	July 1, 2008	Kitt Peak	Spacewatch	·	1.5 km	MPC · JPL
758881	2007 EH_{230}	—	March 14, 2007	Kitt Peak	Spacewatch	NYS	850 m	MPC · JPL
758882	2007 EA_{231}	—	March 15, 2007	Kitt Peak	Spacewatch	NYS	800 m	MPC · JPL
758883	2007 EK_{232}	—	August 27, 2014	Haleakala	Pan-STARRS 1	·	2.1 km	MPC · JPL
758884	2007 EM_{233}	—	October 3, 2013	Haleakala	Pan-STARRS 1	L5	6.8 km	MPC · JPL
758885	2007 EZ_{233}	—	June 11, 2015	Haleakala	Pan-STARRS 1	MAS	500 m	MPC · JPL
758886	2007 EA_{235}	—	March 13, 2007	Kitt Peak	Spacewatch	L5	6.0 km	MPC · JPL
758887	2007 ED_{242}	—	March 15, 2007	Mount Lemmon	Mount Lemmon Survey	L5	6.8 km	MPC · JPL
758888	2007 EG_{243}	—	March 13, 2007	Kitt Peak	Spacewatch	·	2.0 km	MPC · JPL
758889	2007 FV	—	March 16, 2007	Kitt Peak	Spacewatch	·	900 m	MPC · JPL
758890	2007 FV_{6}	—	March 16, 2007	Mount Lemmon	Mount Lemmon Survey	·	1.7 km	MPC · JPL
758891	2007 FP_{19}	—	March 20, 2007	Mount Lemmon	Mount Lemmon Survey	·	870 m	MPC · JPL
758892	2007 FU_{51}	—	January 23, 2006	Mount Lemmon	Mount Lemmon Survey	3:2	3.4 km	MPC · JPL
758893	2007 FV_{53}	—	August 23, 2011	Haleakala	Pan-STARRS 1	·	2.3 km	MPC · JPL
758894	2007 FJ_{55}	—	March 26, 2007	Kitt Peak	Spacewatch	·	1.6 km	MPC · JPL
758895	2007 FY_{56}	—	March 16, 2007	Mount Lemmon	Mount Lemmon Survey	·	860 m	MPC · JPL
758896	2007 FH_{57}	—	March 26, 2007	Mount Lemmon	Mount Lemmon Survey	L5	5.8 km	MPC · JPL
758897	2007 FT_{59}	—	March 26, 2007	Mount Lemmon	Mount Lemmon Survey	KOR	1.1 km	MPC · JPL
758898	2007 FQ_{60}	—	March 19, 2007	Mount Lemmon	Mount Lemmon Survey	L5	6.7 km	MPC · JPL
758899	2007 FS_{60}	—	March 26, 2007	Mount Lemmon	Mount Lemmon Survey	·	1.4 km	MPC · JPL
758900	2007 FU_{61}	—	March 16, 2007	Mount Lemmon	Mount Lemmon Survey	DOR	1.9 km	MPC · JPL

== 758901–759000 ==
back to top

Designation			Discovery			Properties		Ref
Permanent	Provisional	Named after	Date	Site	Discoverer(s)	Category	Diam.	Ref
758901	2007 FJ_{62}	—	March 16, 2007	Kitt Peak	Spacewatch	EOS	1.8 km	MPC · JPL
758902	2007 FS_{62}	—	March 25, 2007	Mount Lemmon	Mount Lemmon Survey	·	1.9 km	MPC · JPL
758903	2007 GH_{37}	—	March 13, 2007	Mount Lemmon	Mount Lemmon Survey	·	710 m	MPC · JPL
758904	2007 GC_{39}	—	March 11, 2007	Mount Lemmon	Mount Lemmon Survey	NYS	960 m	MPC · JPL
758905	2007 GL_{44}	—	April 14, 2007	Mount Lemmon	Mount Lemmon Survey	EOS	1.3 km	MPC · JPL
758906	2007 GZ_{54}	—	April 15, 2007	Kitt Peak	Spacewatch	EOS	1.5 km	MPC · JPL
758907	2007 GO_{80}	—	February 23, 2012	Mount Lemmon	Mount Lemmon Survey	·	1.9 km	MPC · JPL
758908	2007 GB_{82}	—	April 15, 2007	Kitt Peak	Spacewatch	·	1.8 km	MPC · JPL
758909	2007 HY_{51}	—	April 20, 2007	Kitt Peak	Spacewatch	·	1.6 km	MPC · JPL
758910	2007 HC_{61}	—	April 20, 2007	Kitt Peak	Spacewatch	·	1.4 km	MPC · JPL
758911	2007 HA_{81}	—	April 18, 2007	Vail	Observatory, Jarnac	·	1.7 km	MPC · JPL
758912	2007 HX_{83}	—	April 25, 2007	Kitt Peak	Spacewatch	·	580 m	MPC · JPL
758913	2007 HZ_{99}	—	April 19, 2007	Mount Lemmon	Mount Lemmon Survey	·	1.7 km	MPC · JPL
758914	2007 HF_{102}	—	August 31, 2014	Haleakala	Pan-STARRS 1	EOS	1.5 km	MPC · JPL
758915	2007 HG_{102}	—	October 25, 2013	Kitt Peak	Spacewatch	·	710 m	MPC · JPL
758916	2007 HM_{102}	—	October 8, 2015	Haleakala	Pan-STARRS 1	·	2.1 km	MPC · JPL
758917	2007 HQ_{102}	—	August 25, 2014	Haleakala	Pan-STARRS 1	EOS	1.3 km	MPC · JPL
758918	2007 HW_{103}	—	April 22, 2007	Kitt Peak	Spacewatch	615	1.1 km	MPC · JPL
758919	2007 HH_{105}	—	April 17, 2007	Moletai	K. Černis, Zdanavicius, J.	·	2.6 km	MPC · JPL
758920	2007 HL_{105}	—	October 4, 2014	Kitt Peak	Spacewatch	·	1.9 km	MPC · JPL
758921	2007 HG_{106}	—	May 24, 2011	Haleakala	Pan-STARRS 1	NYS	770 m	MPC · JPL
758922	2007 HJ_{106}	—	January 14, 2011	Mount Lemmon	Mount Lemmon Survey	KOR	1.0 km	MPC · JPL
758923	2007 HP_{106}	—	March 20, 2017	Haleakala	Pan-STARRS 1	·	1.7 km	MPC · JPL
758924	2007 HR_{106}	—	March 17, 2018	Haleakala	Pan-STARRS 1	·	1.0 km	MPC · JPL
758925	2007 HS_{108}	—	March 11, 2014	Mount Lemmon	Mount Lemmon Survey	·	760 m	MPC · JPL
758926	2007 HR_{109}	—	February 6, 2011	Kitt Peak	Spacewatch	·	1.3 km	MPC · JPL
758927	2007 HK_{112}	—	April 23, 2007	Kitt Peak	Spacewatch	·	660 m	MPC · JPL
758928	2007 HF_{116}	—	April 26, 2007	Mount Lemmon	Mount Lemmon Survey	·	1.2 km	MPC · JPL
758929	2007 HT_{116}	—	April 22, 2007	Mount Lemmon	Mount Lemmon Survey	·	950 m	MPC · JPL
758930	2007 JG_{29}	—	May 10, 2007	Mount Lemmon	Mount Lemmon Survey	·	2.4 km	MPC · JPL
758931	2007 JD_{38}	—	September 7, 2004	Kitt Peak	Spacewatch	·	840 m	MPC · JPL
758932	2007 JO_{40}	—	May 12, 2007	Mount Lemmon	Mount Lemmon Survey	·	530 m	MPC · JPL
758933	2007 JH_{44}	—	May 12, 2007	XuYi	PMO NEO Survey Program	·	1.1 km	MPC · JPL
758934	2007 JC_{48}	—	April 24, 2014	Haleakala	Pan-STARRS 1	·	750 m	MPC · JPL
758935	2007 JM_{49}	—	February 11, 2013	ESA OGS	ESA OGS	·	630 m	MPC · JPL
758936	2007 JD_{51}	—	February 10, 2016	Haleakala	Pan-STARRS 1	·	1.6 km	MPC · JPL
758937	2007 JT_{52}	—	May 13, 2007	Kitt Peak	Spacewatch	·	1.9 km	MPC · JPL
758938	2007 KB_{10}	—	February 25, 2012	Kitt Peak	Spacewatch	·	2.4 km	MPC · JPL
758939	2007 KJ_{10}	—	January 12, 2016	Haleakala	Pan-STARRS 1	EOS	1.4 km	MPC · JPL
758940	2007 LQ_{2}	—	April 23, 2007	Mount Lemmon	Mount Lemmon Survey	·	1.7 km	MPC · JPL
758941	2007 LC_{12}	—	June 9, 2007	Kitt Peak	Spacewatch	·	950 m	MPC · JPL
758942	2007 LW_{17}	—	April 24, 2007	Mount Lemmon	Mount Lemmon Survey	·	1.3 km	MPC · JPL
758943	2007 LL_{28}	—	June 15, 2007	Kitt Peak	Spacewatch	·	1.4 km	MPC · JPL
758944	2007 LU_{30}	—	June 11, 2007	Mauna Kea	D. D. Balam, K. M. Perrett	EOS	1.4 km	MPC · JPL
758945	2007 LA_{35}	—	June 9, 2007	Kitt Peak	Spacewatch	·	1.5 km	MPC · JPL
758946	2007 LK_{36}	—	June 10, 2007	Kitt Peak	Spacewatch	EOS	1.3 km	MPC · JPL
758947	2007 LV_{38}	—	June 10, 2007	Kitt Peak	Spacewatch	T_{j} (2.98) · 3:2	4.4 km	MPC · JPL
758948	2007 MH_{14}	—	June 20, 2007	Kitt Peak	Spacewatch	·	1.3 km	MPC · JPL
758949	2007 MX_{14}	—	June 20, 2007	Kitt Peak	Spacewatch	·	2.4 km	MPC · JPL
758950	2007 MQ_{28}	—	June 20, 2007	Kitt Peak	Spacewatch	·	420 m	MPC · JPL
758951	2007 MJ_{29}	—	May 14, 2015	Haleakala	Pan-STARRS 1	ADE	1.4 km	MPC · JPL
758952	2007 MN_{29}	—	July 9, 2018	Haleakala	Pan-STARRS 1	·	1.7 km	MPC · JPL
758953	2007 MU_{29}	—	December 22, 2016	Haleakala	Pan-STARRS 1	PHO	800 m	MPC · JPL
758954	2007 MD_{30}	—	November 27, 2014	Haleakala	Pan-STARRS 1	·	2.3 km	MPC · JPL
758955	2007 OA	—	July 16, 2007	Wrightwood	J. W. Young	·	900 m	MPC · JPL
758956	2007 OM_{8}	—	July 24, 2007	Mauna Kea	D. D. Balam, K. M. Perrett	EOS	1.4 km	MPC · JPL
758957	2007 OO_{11}	—	January 18, 2012	Mount Lemmon	Mount Lemmon Survey	·	540 m	MPC · JPL
758958	2007 OX_{11}	—	November 21, 2008	Mount Lemmon	Mount Lemmon Survey	EOS	1.4 km	MPC · JPL
758959	2007 OH_{12}	—	July 18, 2007	Mount Lemmon	Mount Lemmon Survey	·	1.8 km	MPC · JPL
758960	2007 PM_{3}	—	August 6, 2007	Lulin	LUSS	·	2.0 km	MPC · JPL
758961	2007 PY_{9}	—	August 8, 2007	Socorro	LINEAR	·	630 m	MPC · JPL
758962	2007 PB_{23}	—	August 11, 2007	Anderson Mesa	LONEOS	·	1.0 km	MPC · JPL
758963	2007 PL_{41}	—	August 8, 2007	Mauna Kea	D. D. Balam, K. M. Perrett	·	1 km	MPC · JPL
758964	2007 PQ_{49}	—	August 10, 2007	Kitt Peak	Spacewatch	·	1 km	MPC · JPL
758965	2007 PR_{51}	—	August 10, 2007	Kitt Peak	Spacewatch	·	500 m	MPC · JPL
758966	2007 PQ_{52}	—	August 10, 2007	Kitt Peak	Spacewatch	TIR	2.1 km	MPC · JPL
758967	2007 PZ_{52}	—	November 4, 2012	Mount Lemmon	Mount Lemmon Survey	·	1.3 km	MPC · JPL
758968	2007 PE_{53}	—	August 10, 2007	Kitt Peak	Spacewatch	·	1.9 km	MPC · JPL
758969	2007 PN_{54}	—	August 8, 2007	Siding Spring	SSS	·	1.2 km	MPC · JPL
758970	2007 PY_{54}	—	August 10, 2007	Kitt Peak	Spacewatch	EOS	1.4 km	MPC · JPL
758971	2007 QS_{14}	—	August 24, 2007	Kitt Peak	Spacewatch	·	2.2 km	MPC · JPL
758972	2007 QN_{18}	—	August 22, 2007	Anderson Mesa	LONEOS	·	480 m	MPC · JPL
758973	2007 QB_{19}	—	August 23, 2007	Kitt Peak	Spacewatch	LIX	2.4 km	MPC · JPL
758974	2007 QF_{19}	—	August 24, 2007	Kitt Peak	Spacewatch	·	2.0 km	MPC · JPL
758975	2007 QG_{19}	—	August 23, 2007	Kitt Peak	Spacewatch	ARM	2.6 km	MPC · JPL
758976	2007 QJ_{19}	—	August 23, 2007	Kitt Peak	Spacewatch	·	2.1 km	MPC · JPL
758977	2007 QK_{19}	—	August 24, 2007	Kitt Peak	Spacewatch	·	460 m	MPC · JPL
758978	2007 RN_{2}	—	September 2, 2007	Mount Lemmon	Mount Lemmon Survey	·	2.3 km	MPC · JPL
758979	2007 RZ_{12}	—	May 25, 2006	Mauna Kea	P. A. Wiegert	·	2.1 km	MPC · JPL
758980	2007 RK_{14}	—	September 11, 2007	Catalina	CSS	·	2.8 km	MPC · JPL
758981	2007 RP_{16}	—	September 10, 2007	Pic du Midi	Pic du Midi	·	610 m	MPC · JPL
758982	2007 RO_{44}	—	September 9, 2007	Kitt Peak	Spacewatch	·	1.9 km	MPC · JPL
758983	2007 RE_{47}	—	September 9, 2007	Mount Lemmon	Mount Lemmon Survey	THM	2.0 km	MPC · JPL
758984	2007 RL_{47}	—	September 9, 2007	Mount Lemmon	Mount Lemmon Survey	·	2.1 km	MPC · JPL
758985	2007 RW_{50}	—	September 9, 2007	Kitt Peak	Spacewatch	EOS	1.4 km	MPC · JPL
758986	2007 RZ_{58}	—	September 10, 2007	Catalina	CSS	·	430 m	MPC · JPL
758987	2007 RL_{63}	—	September 10, 2007	Mount Lemmon	Mount Lemmon Survey	·	2.1 km	MPC · JPL
758988	2007 RC_{68}	—	September 10, 2007	Kitt Peak	Spacewatch	·	1.9 km	MPC · JPL
758989	2007 RU_{72}	—	August 23, 2007	Kitt Peak	Spacewatch	·	780 m	MPC · JPL
758990	2007 RY_{72}	—	September 10, 2007	Mount Lemmon	Mount Lemmon Survey	·	2.1 km	MPC · JPL
758991	2007 RQ_{74}	—	September 10, 2007	Mount Lemmon	Mount Lemmon Survey	·	2.4 km	MPC · JPL
758992	2007 RS_{89}	—	September 10, 2007	Mount Lemmon	Mount Lemmon Survey	AEO	930 m	MPC · JPL
758993	2007 RC_{90}	—	September 10, 2007	Mount Lemmon	Mount Lemmon Survey	·	1.9 km	MPC · JPL
758994	2007 RL_{94}	—	September 10, 2007	Kitt Peak	Spacewatch	·	450 m	MPC · JPL
758995	2007 RS_{94}	—	September 10, 2007	Kitt Peak	Spacewatch	·	1.0 km	MPC · JPL
758996	2007 RZ_{99}	—	September 11, 2007	Kitt Peak	Spacewatch	·	1.7 km	MPC · JPL
758997	2007 RC_{111}	—	September 11, 2007	Mount Lemmon	Mount Lemmon Survey	·	430 m	MPC · JPL
758998	2007 RB_{115}	—	September 11, 2007	Kitt Peak	Spacewatch	T_{j} (2.99)	2.0 km	MPC · JPL
758999	2007 RT_{121}	—	September 12, 2007	Mount Lemmon	Mount Lemmon Survey	TIR	2.3 km	MPC · JPL
759000	2007 RN_{122}	—	September 12, 2007	Mount Lemmon	Mount Lemmon Survey	THM	1.6 km	MPC · JPL

back to top
