= List of named minor planets: 600000–699999 =

This is a partial list of named minor planets in numerical order. It contains a total of 212 entries as of 9 November 2026. Minor planets for which no article exist are displayed in grey color and redirect to the list of minor planets (see List of minor planets § Main index).

== From 600,000 to 699,999 ==
- 600379 Csortosgyula
- 600432 Weöressándor
- 600539 Aldoatiglio
- 600639 Gevreychambertin
- 600665 Nuitsaintgeorges
- 600867 Kinghu
- 601036 Sassflóra
- 601227 Ammann
- 601476 Scharun
- 601731 Kukuczka
- 601894 Naiman
- 601916 Sting
- 602922 Juhászgyula
- 603021 Galyatető
- 603195 Gilmour
- 603200 Yuchichung
- 603260 Jónáskároly
- 603380 Dorisbrougham
- 603562 Vadimsouley
- 604001 Iagiellonica
- 604429 Lokhorst
- 604468 Olenici
- 604750 Mārisābele
- 604772 Paraschiv
- 604773 Michaelmöller
- 604827 Rietavas
- 605499 Krupko
- 605901 Montághimre
- 605911 Cecily
- 606017 Irimes
- 606339 Kierpiec
- 606701 Golda
- 606875 Bertgrice
- 607372 Colombounilanka
- 609363 Sinelo
- 609755 Thelmazina
- 611064 Jeroenstil
- 611070 Hsurueron
- 611326 Wilfredbuck
- 611494 Gionti
- 611585 Bergbusch
- 611586 Tsartlip
- 611587 Tseycum
- 611980 Pauquachin
- 612163 Thelowes
- 612477 Csörgeierika
- 612787 Haumannpéter
- 612916 Stirlingcolgate
- 612946 Žirmūnai
- 613279 Isaacmiguel
- 613419 Lafayettequartet
- 613813 Svevastallone
- 614470 Flordeneu
- 614641 Gregbredthauer
- 614664 Martinroth
- 614667 Rogersmith
- 614690 Conversimarcello
- 615214 Molnárkristian
- 615355 Jacobkuiper
- 615914 Sziszferenc
- 616184 Malahat
- 616688 Gaowei
- 616689 Yihangyiyang
- 616690 Liaoxi
- 617080 Nögel
- 617403 Boley
- 618051 Sawicki
- 618090 Rucinski
- 618132 Verheyen
- 618349 Williekoorts
- 618694 Gertrudegrice
- 619137 Klausjugelt
- 619356 Lippmann
- 620096 Curupira
- 620307 Casanovas
- 622006 Vákárlajos
- 622398 Fraser
- 622467 Ignés
- 622577 Mioriţa
- 623031 Cartaya
- 623826 Alekseyvarkin
- 623827 Nikandrilyich
- 624448 Gennadiyborisov
- 627030 Ciobanu
- 627435 Mircearusu
- 627520 Corbey
- 627939 Phyllisthornton
- 627981 Ponzoni
- 628318 Stevemould
- 629141 Mihalikenikő
- 631202 Aquarellia
- 631626 Benedektibor
- 632484 Pamelagay
- 633225 Daukša
- 633326 Allashapovalova
- 633348 Shvartsman
- 633570 Viktorzagainov
- 633909 Lazutkin
- 634539 Kuvaev
- 634559 Drayer
- 634624 Almazgaleev
- 634659 Colombo
- 634981 Herbertgrice
- 635057 Bangailona
- 635338 Pécsieszter
- 635381 Michaelcoates
- 635478 Fotonikalv
- 635483 Casimir
- 635771 Prahácsmargit
- 635817 Alexanderkann
- 636680 Lisaloring
- 638624 Xueqikun
- 638676 Žižek
- 639292 Szabózoltán
- 642097 Kusturica
- 643975 Lanthimos
- 645530 Patrickstewart
- 646505 Mihăileanu
- 646626 Valentingrigore
- 646684 Boaca
- 647779 Ansari
- 648211 Kamilhairullin
- 648709 Angissimo
- 649238 Marsloire
- 649792 Sergejbondar
- 649816 Marycoates
- 649964 Friedrichvolck
- 649981 Fainarubleva
- 650474 Chungchaocheng
- 651104 Bobola
- 651168 Petrini
- 651370 Kolen
- 652031 Szczepaniak
- 652223 Huangtushui
- 652410 Janmarszałek
- 652509 Andrewcrossley
- 653564 Genersich
- 653667 Dănuționescu
- 656064 Vladimirasmolov
- 656196 Falchi
- 656841 Uza
- 657932 Cuichenzhou
- 658129 Zwitter
- 658398 Lufonds
- 658642 Carreira
- 658787 Alksnis
- 658882 Žemaitija
- 659267 Cristianstancu
- 660798 Karltreusch
- 660931 Antonpetrov
- 661178 Żywiecmed
- 661666 Chenchengpo
- 661786 Aikman
- 662131 Kierancarroll
- 662607 Cosialls
- 663271 Heinzreinhardt
- 663467 Limeishu
- 663468 Liaochichun
- 664136 Tercu
- 665079 Tym
- 665583 Nikiforov
- 666312 Aroneisenberg
- 666479 Maratmingaliev
- 667294 Missen
- 667514 Pozonuñez
- 667515 Truța
- 667531 Ignasiribas
- 667713 Richardholman
- 667772 Wuhsinheng
- 668527 Christophgerhard
- 668982 Grechuta
- 669448 Pavelgabor
- 669588 Pazura
- 669952 Kootker
- 670740 Mihailsandu
- 670744 Karsh
- 671271 Richardadsouza
- 673014 Kósakissattila
- 673736 Sanhueza
- 673741 Nikolayperov
- 675570 Mircealițe
- 676734 Wójcicki
- 677772 Bettonvil
- 678198 Jeanmariferenbac
- 678300 Herbertcouriol
- 678471 Piermichelbergé
- 678676 Liepāja
- 678800 Juška
- 679211 Gheorghe
- 679552 Efspringer
- 679829 Sucellos
- 679996 Mariyafilippovna
- 679999 Mariyavarkina
- 681819 Shriekback
- 682621 Badalamenti
- 682761 Mittermaiertom
- 683868 Chrupała
- 685739 Semago
- 688117 Omizzolo
- 688696 Bertiau
- 689210 Salvadorjribas
- 689822 Anderson
- 690092 Stuhr
- 690780 Constantinescu
- 690923 Predatu
- 693043 Suhay
- 694537 Vîntdevară
- 696315 Petraios
- 697402 Ao
- 698372 Zhangmi
- 698609 Angli
- 698847 Zhangguimin
back to top

== See also ==
- List of minor planet discoverers
- List of observatory codes
- Meanings of minor planet names § Index
