= List of minor planets: 627001–628000 =

The following is a partial list of minor planets, running from minor-planet number 627001 through 628000, inclusive. The primary data for this and other partial lists is based on JPL's "Small-Body Orbital Elements" and data available from the Minor Planet Center. Critical list information is also provided by the MPC, unless otherwise specified from Lowell Observatory. A detailed description of the table's columns and additional sources are given on the main page including a complete list of every page in this series, and a statistical break-up on the dynamical classification of minor planets.

Also see the summary list of all named bodies in numerical and alphabetical order, and the corresponding naming citations for the number range of this particular list. New namings may only be added to this list after official publication, as the preannouncement of names is condemned by the Working Group for Small Bodies Nomenclature of the International Astronomical Union.

Near-Earth obj.	MBA (inner)	MBA (outer)	Centaur
Mars-crosser	MBA (middle)	Jupiter trojan	Trans-Neptunian obj.
Unclassified

== 627001–627100 ==
Designation			Discovery			Properties		Ref
Permanent	Provisional	Named after	Date	Site	Discoverer(s)	Category	Diam.	Ref
627001	2008 DL_{69}	—	February 29, 2008	Kitt Peak	Spacewatch	·	1.7 km	MPC · JPL
627002	2008 DK_{90}	—	February 28, 2008	Mount Lemmon	Mount Lemmon Survey	·	680 m	MPC · JPL
627003	2008 DA_{91}	—	February 27, 2008	Mount Lemmon	Mount Lemmon Survey	·	1.3 km	MPC · JPL
627004	2008 DN_{93}	—	February 28, 2008	Mount Lemmon	Mount Lemmon Survey	·	560 m	MPC · JPL
627005	2008 EF_{3}	—	February 14, 2008	Mount Lemmon	Mount Lemmon Survey	EUN	1.1 km	MPC · JPL
627006	2008 EE_{4}	—	March 1, 2008	Mount Lemmon	Mount Lemmon Survey	·	1.3 km	MPC · JPL
627007	2008 ED_{9}	—	March 8, 2008	La Cañada	Lacruz, J.	·	490 m	MPC · JPL
627008	2008 ER_{13}	—	March 1, 2008	Kitt Peak	Spacewatch	·	1.7 km	MPC · JPL
627009	2008 EU_{17}	—	December 27, 2006	Mount Lemmon	Mount Lemmon Survey	·	3.7 km	MPC · JPL
627010	2008 EE_{30}	—	February 8, 2008	Kitt Peak	Spacewatch	·	810 m	MPC · JPL
627011	2008 EJ_{40}	—	March 4, 2008	Kitt Peak	Spacewatch	THB	2.1 km	MPC · JPL
627012	2008 EO_{45}	—	August 20, 2001	Cerro Tololo	Deep Ecliptic Survey	·	1.2 km	MPC · JPL
627013	2008 ES_{50}	—	February 7, 2008	Kitt Peak	Spacewatch	·	890 m	MPC · JPL
627014	2008 EC_{54}	—	March 6, 2008	Mount Lemmon	Mount Lemmon Survey	L5	9.8 km	MPC · JPL
627015	2008 EN_{62}	—	March 9, 2008	Mount Lemmon	Mount Lemmon Survey	·	1.1 km	MPC · JPL
627016	2008 EU_{62}	—	March 9, 2008	Mount Lemmon	Mount Lemmon Survey	·	600 m	MPC · JPL
627017	2008 EE_{63}	—	March 9, 2008	Mount Lemmon	Mount Lemmon Survey	EUN	840 m	MPC · JPL
627018	2008 EF_{63}	—	February 12, 2008	Mount Lemmon	Mount Lemmon Survey	·	1.4 km	MPC · JPL
627019	2008 EK_{63}	—	February 12, 2008	Mount Lemmon	Mount Lemmon Survey	·	630 m	MPC · JPL
627020	2008 EL_{65}	—	March 9, 2008	Mount Lemmon	Mount Lemmon Survey	·	1.5 km	MPC · JPL
627021	2008 ES_{72}	—	March 6, 2008	Mount Lemmon	Mount Lemmon Survey	·	2.1 km	MPC · JPL
627022	2008 EO_{95}	—	March 2, 2008	XuYi	PMO NEO Survey Program	·	640 m	MPC · JPL
627023	2008 EL_{104}	—	March 6, 2008	Mount Lemmon	Mount Lemmon Survey	·	560 m	MPC · JPL
627024	2008 EK_{106}	—	February 13, 2008	Kitt Peak	Spacewatch	·	930 m	MPC · JPL
627025	2008 EV_{106}	—	March 6, 2008	Mount Lemmon	Mount Lemmon Survey	·	2.0 km	MPC · JPL
627026	2008 EO_{124}	—	October 3, 2003	Kitt Peak	Spacewatch	·	610 m	MPC · JPL
627027	2008 ER_{125}	—	September 21, 2006	Catalina	CSS	T_{j} (2.97)	3.2 km	MPC · JPL
627028	2008 EG_{131}	—	March 11, 2008	Mount Lemmon	Mount Lemmon Survey	EUP	2.4 km	MPC · JPL
627029	2008 EH_{143}	—	March 3, 2008	XuYi	PMO NEO Survey Program	·	1.4 km	MPC · JPL
627030 Ciobanu	2008 EL_{144}	Ciobanu	March 11, 2008	La Silla	EURONEAR	H	450 m	MPC · JPL
627031	2008 EM_{162}	—	March 13, 2008	Kitt Peak	Spacewatch	·	560 m	MPC · JPL
627032	2008 EO_{163}	—	March 15, 2008	Mount Lemmon	Mount Lemmon Survey	·	1.4 km	MPC · JPL
627033	2008 EH_{164}	—	February 9, 2008	Kitt Peak	Spacewatch	·	940 m	MPC · JPL
627034	2008 ES_{173}	—	March 6, 2008	Mount Lemmon	Mount Lemmon Survey	·	1.3 km	MPC · JPL
627035	2008 EZ_{173}	—	March 10, 2008	Kitt Peak	Spacewatch	·	1.5 km	MPC · JPL
627036	2008 EJ_{176}	—	September 26, 2012	Haleakala	Pan-STARRS 1	H	430 m	MPC · JPL
627037	2008 EM_{177}	—	December 9, 2015	Mount Lemmon	Mount Lemmon Survey	·	1.3 km	MPC · JPL
627038	2008 EO_{177}	—	March 10, 2008	Kitt Peak	Spacewatch	L5	7.8 km	MPC · JPL
627039	2008 EF_{178}	—	March 2, 2008	Mount Lemmon	Mount Lemmon Survey	·	1.4 km	MPC · JPL
627040	2008 EM_{182}	—	April 5, 2014	Haleakala	Pan-STARRS 1	·	2.2 km	MPC · JPL
627041	2008 EC_{186}	—	December 4, 2015	Haleakala	Pan-STARRS 1	·	790 m	MPC · JPL
627042	2008 EC_{188}	—	November 3, 2010	Mount Lemmon	Mount Lemmon Survey	·	1.7 km	MPC · JPL
627043	2008 EJ_{188}	—	March 12, 2008	Mount Lemmon	Mount Lemmon Survey	·	1.5 km	MPC · JPL
627044	2008 EA_{191}	—	March 7, 2008	Kitt Peak	Spacewatch	·	2.0 km	MPC · JPL
627045	2008 EJ_{193}	—	March 8, 2008	Mount Lemmon	Mount Lemmon Survey	·	1.2 km	MPC · JPL
627046	2008 ER_{193}	—	March 12, 2008	Kitt Peak	Spacewatch	·	610 m	MPC · JPL
627047	2008 FF_{9}	—	February 26, 2008	Mount Lemmon	Mount Lemmon Survey	·	760 m	MPC · JPL
627048	2008 FF_{11}	—	March 3, 2008	Mount Lemmon	Mount Lemmon Survey	H	480 m	MPC · JPL
627049	2008 FU_{16}	—	March 27, 2008	Kitt Peak	Spacewatch	·	1.2 km	MPC · JPL
627050	2008 FW_{24}	—	March 12, 2008	Mount Lemmon	Mount Lemmon Survey	·	1.3 km	MPC · JPL
627051	2008 FL_{25}	—	February 10, 2008	Kitt Peak	Spacewatch	(2076)	500 m	MPC · JPL
627052	2008 FP_{36}	—	March 28, 2008	Mount Lemmon	Mount Lemmon Survey	·	1.2 km	MPC · JPL
627053	2008 FH_{39}	—	March 28, 2008	Kitt Peak	Spacewatch	·	1.6 km	MPC · JPL
627054	2008 FO_{45}	—	March 28, 2008	Mount Lemmon	Mount Lemmon Survey	·	1.4 km	MPC · JPL
627055	2008 FO_{73}	—	March 30, 2008	Kitt Peak	Spacewatch	·	1.6 km	MPC · JPL
627056	2008 FT_{80}	—	March 27, 2008	Mount Lemmon	Mount Lemmon Survey	KOR	1.2 km	MPC · JPL
627057	2008 FU_{81}	—	March 1, 2008	Kitt Peak	Spacewatch	L5	8.0 km	MPC · JPL
627058	2008 FM_{87}	—	March 28, 2008	Kitt Peak	Spacewatch	L5	9.5 km	MPC · JPL
627059	2008 FM_{96}	—	October 3, 2006	Mount Lemmon	Mount Lemmon Survey	·	1.3 km	MPC · JPL
627060	2008 FD_{99}	—	March 30, 2008	Kitt Peak	Spacewatch	·	1.5 km	MPC · JPL
627061	2008 FV_{103}	—	March 30, 2008	Kitt Peak	Spacewatch	·	1.8 km	MPC · JPL
627062	2008 FZ_{109}	—	March 31, 2008	Mount Lemmon	Mount Lemmon Survey	·	1.3 km	MPC · JPL
627063	2008 FY_{122}	—	March 28, 2008	Mount Lemmon	Mount Lemmon Survey	·	1.6 km	MPC · JPL
627064	2008 FG_{135}	—	March 31, 2008	Mount Lemmon	Mount Lemmon Survey	·	520 m	MPC · JPL
627065	2008 FZ_{138}	—	March 30, 2008	Kitt Peak	Spacewatch	·	740 m	MPC · JPL
627066	2008 FC_{139}	—	March 28, 2008	Mount Lemmon	Mount Lemmon Survey	·	570 m	MPC · JPL
627067	2008 FP_{139}	—	March 27, 2008	Mount Lemmon	Mount Lemmon Survey	·	1.5 km	MPC · JPL
627068	2008 FC_{140}	—	March 29, 2008	Kitt Peak	Spacewatch	·	1.9 km	MPC · JPL
627069	2008 FJ_{140}	—	March 31, 2008	Mount Lemmon	Mount Lemmon Survey	·	790 m	MPC · JPL
627070	2008 FD_{141}	—	September 15, 2006	Kitt Peak	Spacewatch	·	1.4 km	MPC · JPL
627071	2008 FC_{142}	—	February 18, 2015	Haleakala	Pan-STARRS 1	·	780 m	MPC · JPL
627072	2008 FO_{142}	—	March 31, 2008	Mount Lemmon	Mount Lemmon Survey	·	1.9 km	MPC · JPL
627073	2008 FQ_{142}	—	March 29, 2008	Catalina	CSS	T_{j} (2.98) · EUP	2.7 km	MPC · JPL
627074	2008 FV_{143}	—	September 27, 2009	Catalina	CSS	·	980 m	MPC · JPL
627075	2008 FL_{144}	—	March 29, 2008	Kitt Peak	Spacewatch	H	370 m	MPC · JPL
627076	2008 FJ_{145}	—	March 31, 2008	Mount Lemmon	Mount Lemmon Survey	·	1.4 km	MPC · JPL
627077	2008 FC_{147}	—	March 27, 2008	Mount Lemmon	Mount Lemmon Survey	·	1.6 km	MPC · JPL
627078	2008 FS_{147}	—	March 31, 2008	Kitt Peak	Spacewatch	·	460 m	MPC · JPL
627079	2008 FC_{149}	—	March 31, 2008	Mount Lemmon	Mount Lemmon Survey	·	2.1 km	MPC · JPL
627080	2008 GA_{3}	—	April 7, 2008	Mount Lemmon	Mount Lemmon Survey	·	390 m	MPC · JPL
627081	2008 GO_{5}	—	April 1, 2008	Kitt Peak	Spacewatch	·	1.2 km	MPC · JPL
627082	2008 GM_{12}	—	April 3, 2008	Kitt Peak	Spacewatch	·	1.4 km	MPC · JPL
627083	2008 GO_{13}	—	August 6, 2005	Palomar	NEAT	NYS	990 m	MPC · JPL
627084	2008 GK_{35}	—	April 3, 2008	Kitt Peak	Spacewatch	·	510 m	MPC · JPL
627085	2008 GC_{36}	—	April 3, 2008	Kitt Peak	Spacewatch	·	590 m	MPC · JPL
627086	2008 GL_{40}	—	April 4, 2008	Mount Lemmon	Mount Lemmon Survey	MAS	540 m	MPC · JPL
627087	2008 GO_{53}	—	April 5, 2008	Mount Lemmon	Mount Lemmon Survey	·	1.2 km	MPC · JPL
627088	2008 GN_{64}	—	April 6, 2008	Kitt Peak	Spacewatch	·	740 m	MPC · JPL
627089	2008 GX_{80}	—	April 7, 2008	Kitt Peak	Spacewatch	·	840 m	MPC · JPL
627090	2008 GU_{81}	—	April 25, 2003	Kitt Peak	Spacewatch	·	1.8 km	MPC · JPL
627091	2008 GA_{133}	—	April 15, 2008	Kitt Peak	Spacewatch	·	2.1 km	MPC · JPL
627092	2008 GR_{144}	—	April 4, 2008	Kitt Peak	Spacewatch	·	760 m	MPC · JPL
627093	2008 GO_{150}	—	January 17, 2013	Haleakala	Pan-STARRS 1	·	3.5 km	MPC · JPL
627094	2008 GQ_{151}	—	April 15, 2008	Mount Lemmon	Mount Lemmon Survey	·	1.7 km	MPC · JPL
627095	2008 GA_{154}	—	March 17, 2012	Mount Lemmon	Mount Lemmon Survey	·	930 m	MPC · JPL
627096	2008 GB_{154}	—	April 7, 2008	Kitt Peak	Spacewatch	·	1.4 km	MPC · JPL
627097	2008 GW_{155}	—	April 1, 2008	Mount Lemmon	Mount Lemmon Survey	H	400 m	MPC · JPL
627098	2008 GT_{157}	—	April 1, 2008	Kitt Peak	Spacewatch	T_{j} (2.98)	2.3 km	MPC · JPL
627099	2008 GR_{158}	—	April 11, 2008	Mount Lemmon	Mount Lemmon Survey	AEO	1.1 km	MPC · JPL
627100	2008 GV_{160}	—	April 3, 2008	Mount Lemmon	Mount Lemmon Survey	·	1.7 km	MPC · JPL

== 627101–627200 ==
back to top

Designation			Discovery			Properties		Ref
Permanent	Provisional	Named after	Date	Site	Discoverer(s)	Category	Diam.	Ref
627101	2008 GG_{161}	—	December 27, 2011	Mount Lemmon	Mount Lemmon Survey	·	1.3 km	MPC · JPL
627102	2008 GW_{161}	—	April 1, 2008	Kitt Peak	Spacewatch	·	1.1 km	MPC · JPL
627103	2008 GG_{162}	—	April 5, 2008	Mount Lemmon	Mount Lemmon Survey	·	460 m	MPC · JPL
627104	2008 GC_{166}	—	February 15, 2012	Haleakala	Pan-STARRS 1	·	1.5 km	MPC · JPL
627105	2008 GY_{169}	—	April 6, 2008	Kitt Peak	Spacewatch	L5	6.9 km	MPC · JPL
627106	2008 HC_{6}	—	April 24, 2008	Kitt Peak	Spacewatch	·	840 m	MPC · JPL
627107	2008 HD_{7}	—	March 10, 2008	Mount Lemmon	Mount Lemmon Survey	H	470 m	MPC · JPL
627108	2008 HW_{13}	—	April 15, 2008	Mount Lemmon	Mount Lemmon Survey	AEO	870 m	MPC · JPL
627109	2008 HC_{17}	—	April 13, 2008	Mount Lemmon	Mount Lemmon Survey	·	2.0 km	MPC · JPL
627110	2008 HG_{25}	—	March 13, 2008	Kitt Peak	Spacewatch	·	1.7 km	MPC · JPL
627111	2008 HP_{26}	—	April 11, 2008	Mount Lemmon	Mount Lemmon Survey	·	760 m	MPC · JPL
627112	2008 HX_{31}	—	March 26, 2007	Mount Lemmon	Mount Lemmon Survey	L5	6.7 km	MPC · JPL
627113	2008 HE_{32}	—	January 27, 2007	Kitt Peak	Spacewatch	AGN	1.1 km	MPC · JPL
627114	2008 HU_{37}	—	April 30, 2008	Dauban	Kugel, C. R. F.	·	1.4 km	MPC · JPL
627115	2008 HQ_{41}	—	April 26, 2008	Mount Lemmon	Mount Lemmon Survey	·	1.7 km	MPC · JPL
627116	2008 HR_{46}	—	April 28, 2008	Mount Lemmon	Mount Lemmon Survey	H	290 m	MPC · JPL
627117	2008 HZ_{53}	—	April 29, 2008	Kitt Peak	Spacewatch	·	800 m	MPC · JPL
627118	2008 HU_{67}	—	April 30, 2008	Mount Lemmon	Mount Lemmon Survey	·	1.8 km	MPC · JPL
627119	2008 HM_{71}	—	April 27, 2008	Mount Lemmon	Mount Lemmon Survey	NEM	2.1 km	MPC · JPL
627120	2008 HU_{71}	—	May 8, 2014	Mount Lemmon	Mount Lemmon Survey	T_{j} (2.99)	2.7 km	MPC · JPL
627121	2008 HK_{72}	—	April 30, 2008	Mount Lemmon	Mount Lemmon Survey	LIX	2.7 km	MPC · JPL
627122	2008 HY_{72}	—	July 31, 2014	Haleakala	Pan-STARRS 1	AGN	940 m	MPC · JPL
627123	2008 HF_{73}	—	January 26, 2011	Kitt Peak	Spacewatch	·	510 m	MPC · JPL
627124	2008 HR_{74}	—	April 27, 2008	Kitt Peak	Spacewatch	MRX	880 m	MPC · JPL
627125	2008 HN_{76}	—	October 13, 2010	Mount Lemmon	Mount Lemmon Survey	·	1.3 km	MPC · JPL
627126	2008 JE_{6}	—	May 2, 2008	Kitt Peak	Spacewatch	H	440 m	MPC · JPL
627127	2008 JH_{11}	—	April 29, 2008	Kitt Peak	Spacewatch	·	1.1 km	MPC · JPL
627128	2008 JQ_{31}	—	April 27, 2008	Kitt Peak	Spacewatch	·	1.5 km	MPC · JPL
627129	2008 JD_{34}	—	April 16, 2008	Mount Lemmon	Mount Lemmon Survey	·	1.6 km	MPC · JPL
627130	2008 JM_{42}	—	February 15, 2012	Haleakala	Pan-STARRS 1	·	2.3 km	MPC · JPL
627131	2008 JA_{43}	—	November 1, 2010	Mount Lemmon	Mount Lemmon Survey	·	1.5 km	MPC · JPL
627132	2008 JZ_{45}	—	May 8, 2008	Mount Lemmon	Mount Lemmon Survey	·	2.3 km	MPC · JPL
627133	2008 JA_{46}	—	May 3, 2008	Mount Lemmon	Mount Lemmon Survey	LIX	2.7 km	MPC · JPL
627134	2008 JM_{48}	—	May 14, 2008	Mount Lemmon	Mount Lemmon Survey	THM	2.0 km	MPC · JPL
627135	2008 JB_{50}	—	May 2, 2008	Mount Lemmon	Mount Lemmon Survey	L5	7.0 km	MPC · JPL
627136	2008 JC_{50}	—	May 5, 2008	Kitt Peak	Spacewatch	·	870 m	MPC · JPL
627137	2008 JP_{50}	—	May 15, 2008	Mount Lemmon	Mount Lemmon Survey	TIR	2.0 km	MPC · JPL
627138	2008 JS_{50}	—	May 5, 2008	Mount Lemmon	Mount Lemmon Survey	GEF	1 km	MPC · JPL
627139	2008 JO_{51}	—	May 15, 2008	Mount Lemmon	Mount Lemmon Survey	·	2.3 km	MPC · JPL
627140	2008 JW_{53}	—	May 2, 2008	Catalina	CSS	·	580 m	MPC · JPL
627141	2008 KY_{8}	—	May 3, 2008	Kitt Peak	Spacewatch	·	500 m	MPC · JPL
627142	2008 KD_{11}	—	April 7, 2008	Kitt Peak	Spacewatch	·	1.6 km	MPC · JPL
627143	2008 KC_{21}	—	April 6, 2008	Mount Lemmon	Mount Lemmon Survey	L5	7.8 km	MPC · JPL
627144	2008 KR_{28}	—	May 15, 2008	Mount Lemmon	Mount Lemmon Survey	·	2.0 km	MPC · JPL
627145	2008 KX_{28}	—	May 27, 2008	Mount Lemmon	Mount Lemmon Survey	H	470 m	MPC · JPL
627146	2008 KP_{32}	—	April 1, 2003	Apache Point	SDSS Collaboration	·	1.7 km	MPC · JPL
627147	2008 KP_{46}	—	May 11, 2008	Kitt Peak	Spacewatch	EOS	1.2 km	MPC · JPL
627148	2008 KG_{47}	—	April 23, 2015	Haleakala	Pan-STARRS 1	·	610 m	MPC · JPL
627149	2008 LC_{1}	—	May 5, 2008	Kitt Peak	Spacewatch	H	500 m	MPC · JPL
627150	2008 LR_{6}	—	May 3, 2008	Kitt Peak	Spacewatch	·	510 m	MPC · JPL
627151	2008 LC_{9}	—	June 3, 2008	Mount Lemmon	Mount Lemmon Survey	H	340 m	MPC · JPL
627152	2008 LG_{10}	—	June 6, 2008	Kitt Peak	Spacewatch	·	3.2 km	MPC · JPL
627153	2008 LH_{15}	—	June 9, 2008	Kitt Peak	Spacewatch	·	1.6 km	MPC · JPL
627154	2008 LG_{19}	—	November 21, 2014	Haleakala	Pan-STARRS 1	L5	8.5 km	MPC · JPL
627155	2008 LM_{20}	—	August 3, 2014	Haleakala	Pan-STARRS 1	·	2.4 km	MPC · JPL
627156	2008 LO_{20}	—	September 12, 2015	Haleakala	Pan-STARRS 1	·	1.9 km	MPC · JPL
627157	2008 OX_{1}	—	July 28, 2008	Mount Lemmon	Mount Lemmon Survey	APO · PHA	180 m	MPC · JPL
627158	2008 OQ_{4}	—	July 28, 2008	Mount Lemmon	Mount Lemmon Survey	T_{j} (2.98)	2.3 km	MPC · JPL
627159	2008 OU_{17}	—	July 30, 2008	Mount Lemmon	Mount Lemmon Survey	THB	2.1 km	MPC · JPL
627160	2008 OF_{18}	—	July 30, 2008	Mount Lemmon	Mount Lemmon Survey	·	2.8 km	MPC · JPL
627161	2008 OH_{31}	—	July 29, 2008	Kitt Peak	Spacewatch	·	730 m	MPC · JPL
627162	2008 OV_{31}	—	July 30, 2008	Mount Lemmon	Mount Lemmon Survey	MAS	570 m	MPC · JPL
627163	2008 ON_{32}	—	July 29, 2008	Kitt Peak	Spacewatch	·	650 m	MPC · JPL
627164	2008 PE_{7}	—	May 30, 2008	Mount Lemmon	Mount Lemmon Survey	THB	2.7 km	MPC · JPL
627165	2008 PA_{12}	—	July 29, 2008	Kitt Peak	Spacewatch	·	1 km	MPC · JPL
627166	2008 PG_{13}	—	September 21, 2003	Palomar	NEAT	·	2.1 km	MPC · JPL
627167	2008 PF_{14}	—	August 10, 2008	La Sagra	OAM	·	650 m	MPC · JPL
627168	2008 PH_{19}	—	August 7, 2008	Kitt Peak	Spacewatch	·	1.5 km	MPC · JPL
627169	2008 QS_{2}	—	August 23, 2008	Dauban	Kugel, C. R. F.	·	2.6 km	MPC · JPL
627170	2008 QK_{9}	—	August 7, 2008	Kitt Peak	Spacewatch	·	990 m	MPC · JPL
627171	2008 QS_{23}	—	August 28, 2008	Parc National des Cévennes	C. Demeautis, J.-M. Lopez	·	2.5 km	MPC · JPL
627172	2008 QF_{36}	—	August 21, 2008	Kitt Peak	Spacewatch	MAS	660 m	MPC · JPL
627173	2008 QX_{48}	—	August 20, 2008	Kitt Peak	Spacewatch	·	960 m	MPC · JPL
627174	2008 QH_{50}	—	August 24, 2008	Kitt Peak	Spacewatch	·	2.5 km	MPC · JPL
627175	2008 RG_{2}	—	September 2, 2008	Kitt Peak	Spacewatch	·	740 m	MPC · JPL
627176	2008 RH_{2}	—	September 2, 2008	Kitt Peak	Spacewatch	·	2.0 km	MPC · JPL
627177	2008 RJ_{14}	—	August 24, 2008	Kitt Peak	Spacewatch	·	1.5 km	MPC · JPL
627178	2008 RO_{30}	—	September 2, 2008	Kitt Peak	Spacewatch	·	880 m	MPC · JPL
627179	2008 RF_{40}	—	September 2, 2008	Kitt Peak	Spacewatch	THM	1.8 km	MPC · JPL
627180	2008 RF_{45}	—	September 2, 2008	Kitt Peak	Spacewatch	·	570 m	MPC · JPL
627181	2008 RQ_{48}	—	September 3, 2008	Kitt Peak	Spacewatch	·	2.6 km	MPC · JPL
627182	2008 RU_{52}	—	September 3, 2008	Kitt Peak	Spacewatch	·	1.0 km	MPC · JPL
627183	2008 RL_{59}	—	June 19, 2004	Kitt Peak	Spacewatch	·	1.1 km	MPC · JPL
627184	2008 RB_{70}	—	September 21, 2001	Kitt Peak	Spacewatch	V	460 m	MPC · JPL
627185	2008 RT_{75}	—	September 6, 2008	Mount Lemmon	Mount Lemmon Survey	·	1.8 km	MPC · JPL
627186	2008 RA_{77}	—	September 6, 2008	Mount Lemmon	Mount Lemmon Survey	·	1.6 km	MPC · JPL
627187	2008 RR_{80}	—	September 3, 2008	Kitt Peak	Spacewatch	·	940 m	MPC · JPL
627188	2008 RY_{81}	—	July 29, 2008	Mount Lemmon	Mount Lemmon Survey	·	2.3 km	MPC · JPL
627189	2008 RV_{105}	—	September 6, 2008	Mount Lemmon	Mount Lemmon Survey	·	940 m	MPC · JPL
627190	2008 RB_{119}	—	September 2, 2008	Kitt Peak	Spacewatch	·	1.9 km	MPC · JPL
627191	2008 RG_{120}	—	September 7, 2008	Mount Lemmon	Mount Lemmon Survey	·	900 m	MPC · JPL
627192	2008 RF_{121}	—	September 2, 2008	Kitt Peak	Spacewatch	MAS	580 m	MPC · JPL
627193	2008 RD_{124}	—	October 25, 2003	Kitt Peak	Spacewatch	·	1.9 km	MPC · JPL
627194	2008 RA_{127}	—	September 5, 2008	Kitt Peak	Spacewatch	LIX	2.3 km	MPC · JPL
627195	2008 RQ_{135}	—	September 3, 2008	Kitt Peak	Spacewatch	MAS	670 m	MPC · JPL
627196	2008 RC_{141}	—	September 6, 2008	Catalina	CSS	ERI	1.0 km	MPC · JPL
627197	2008 RX_{143}	—	September 6, 2008	Kitt Peak	Spacewatch	THM	1.6 km	MPC · JPL
627198	2008 RC_{144}	—	September 4, 2008	Kitt Peak	Spacewatch	·	640 m	MPC · JPL
627199	2008 RP_{146}	—	September 9, 2008	Kitt Peak	Spacewatch	·	2.0 km	MPC · JPL
627200	2008 RN_{148}	—	September 5, 2008	Kitt Peak	Spacewatch	V	600 m	MPC · JPL

== 627201–627300 ==
back to top

Designation			Discovery			Properties		Ref
Permanent	Provisional	Named after	Date	Site	Discoverer(s)	Category	Diam.	Ref
627201	2008 RM_{151}	—	September 4, 2008	Kitt Peak	Spacewatch	·	1.6 km	MPC · JPL
627202	2008 RO_{152}	—	September 7, 2008	Mount Lemmon	Mount Lemmon Survey	·	970 m	MPC · JPL
627203	2008 RX_{153}	—	September 7, 2008	Mount Lemmon	Mount Lemmon Survey	·	1.0 km	MPC · JPL
627204	2008 RH_{156}	—	September 9, 2008	Mount Lemmon	Mount Lemmon Survey	V	560 m	MPC · JPL
627205	2008 RG_{157}	—	September 5, 2008	Kitt Peak	Spacewatch	·	2.0 km	MPC · JPL
627206	2008 RS_{161}	—	September 7, 2008	Mount Lemmon	Mount Lemmon Survey	HYG	2.0 km	MPC · JPL
627207	2008 RF_{164}	—	September 7, 2008	Mount Lemmon	Mount Lemmon Survey	·	800 m	MPC · JPL
627208	2008 RH_{165}	—	September 26, 2003	Apache Point	SDSS Collaboration	·	1.7 km	MPC · JPL
627209	2008 RQ_{167}	—	September 6, 2008	Mount Lemmon	Mount Lemmon Survey	·	1.7 km	MPC · JPL
627210	2008 RK_{169}	—	September 7, 2008	Mount Lemmon	Mount Lemmon Survey	·	870 m	MPC · JPL
627211	2008 RV_{170}	—	September 3, 2008	Kitt Peak	Spacewatch	·	1.4 km	MPC · JPL
627212	2008 RG_{175}	—	September 7, 2008	Mount Lemmon	Mount Lemmon Survey	·	1.9 km	MPC · JPL
627213	2008 SP_{2}	—	September 23, 2008	Socorro	LINEAR	·	390 m	MPC · JPL
627214	2008 SZ_{19}	—	September 9, 2008	Mount Lemmon	Mount Lemmon Survey	·	780 m	MPC · JPL
627215	2008 SE_{32}	—	September 5, 2008	Kitt Peak	Spacewatch	·	950 m	MPC · JPL
627216	2008 SO_{37}	—	September 20, 2008	Kitt Peak	Spacewatch	·	2.1 km	MPC · JPL
627217	2008 SD_{41}	—	September 6, 2008	Catalina	CSS	·	940 m	MPC · JPL
627218	2008 SN_{46}	—	September 20, 2008	Kitt Peak	Spacewatch	·	390 m	MPC · JPL
627219	2008 SW_{48}	—	September 20, 2008	Mount Lemmon	Mount Lemmon Survey	·	2.1 km	MPC · JPL
627220	2008 ST_{56}	—	September 7, 2008	Mount Lemmon	Mount Lemmon Survey	·	1.2 km	MPC · JPL
627221	2008 SQ_{63}	—	October 21, 2014	Mount Lemmon	Mount Lemmon Survey	·	1.7 km	MPC · JPL
627222	2008 SD_{65}	—	September 21, 2008	Kitt Peak	Spacewatch	·	830 m	MPC · JPL
627223	2008 SX_{72}	—	September 22, 2008	Mount Lemmon	Mount Lemmon Survey	MAS	780 m	MPC · JPL
627224	2008 SC_{74}	—	September 4, 2008	Kitt Peak	Spacewatch	·	1.8 km	MPC · JPL
627225	2008 SH_{78}	—	August 24, 2008	Kitt Peak	Spacewatch	·	2.1 km	MPC · JPL
627226	2008 SQ_{78}	—	September 23, 2008	Catalina	CSS	·	2.0 km	MPC · JPL
627227	2008 SB_{81}	—	September 23, 2008	Mount Lemmon	Mount Lemmon Survey	·	720 m	MPC · JPL
627228	2008 SW_{82}	—	September 21, 2008	Kitt Peak	Spacewatch	·	910 m	MPC · JPL
627229	2008 SX_{86}	—	September 9, 2008	Kitt Peak	Spacewatch	V	420 m	MPC · JPL
627230	2008 SK_{95}	—	September 21, 2008	Kitt Peak	Spacewatch	·	1.0 km	MPC · JPL
627231	2008 SJ_{103}	—	September 6, 2008	Mount Lemmon	Mount Lemmon Survey	·	910 m	MPC · JPL
627232	2008 SJ_{105}	—	September 6, 2008	Mount Lemmon	Mount Lemmon Survey	(5)	850 m	MPC · JPL
627233	2008 ST_{108}	—	September 22, 2008	Mount Lemmon	Mount Lemmon Survey	·	900 m	MPC · JPL
627234	2008 SN_{110}	—	September 22, 2008	Kitt Peak	Spacewatch	·	1.7 km	MPC · JPL
627235	2008 SS_{111}	—	September 22, 2008	Mount Lemmon	Mount Lemmon Survey	THM	1.6 km	MPC · JPL
627236	2008 ST_{113}	—	September 22, 2008	Kitt Peak	Spacewatch	·	1.2 km	MPC · JPL
627237	2008 SP_{118}	—	September 22, 2008	Mount Lemmon	Mount Lemmon Survey	EOS	1.4 km	MPC · JPL
627238	2008 SS_{129}	—	September 22, 2008	Kitt Peak	Spacewatch	·	980 m	MPC · JPL
627239	2008 SF_{132}	—	September 7, 2008	Mount Lemmon	Mount Lemmon Survey	(5)	940 m	MPC · JPL
627240	2008 ST_{134}	—	September 5, 2008	Kitt Peak	Spacewatch	·	900 m	MPC · JPL
627241	2008 SG_{138}	—	September 23, 2008	Kitt Peak	Spacewatch	NYS	900 m	MPC · JPL
627242	2008 ST_{138}	—	September 23, 2008	Kitt Peak	Spacewatch	EOS	1.4 km	MPC · JPL
627243	2008 SH_{140}	—	September 24, 2008	Kitt Peak	Spacewatch	·	1.7 km	MPC · JPL
627244	2008 SN_{146}	—	September 23, 2008	Kitt Peak	Spacewatch	·	970 m	MPC · JPL
627245	2008 SK_{147}	—	September 8, 2008	Bergisch Gladbach	W. Bickel	·	2.3 km	MPC · JPL
627246	2008 SU_{147}	—	September 25, 2008	Junk Bond	D. Healy	MAS	580 m	MPC · JPL
627247	2008 SL_{148}	—	September 27, 2008	Taunus	E. Schwab, Karge, S.	·	1.9 km	MPC · JPL
627248	2008 SW_{153}	—	August 23, 2008	Kitt Peak	Spacewatch	·	1.1 km	MPC · JPL
627249	2008 SV_{170}	—	September 21, 2008	Mount Lemmon	Mount Lemmon Survey	·	1.9 km	MPC · JPL
627250	2008 SO_{206}	—	September 26, 2008	Kitt Peak	Spacewatch	·	910 m	MPC · JPL
627251	2008 SB_{211}	—	September 9, 2008	Kitt Peak	Spacewatch	·	2.3 km	MPC · JPL
627252	2008 ST_{220}	—	September 25, 2008	Kitt Peak	Spacewatch	·	870 m	MPC · JPL
627253	2008 SD_{225}	—	September 26, 2008	Kitt Peak	Spacewatch	KON	1.3 km	MPC · JPL
627254	2008 SF_{225}	—	September 26, 2008	Kitt Peak	Spacewatch	·	1.6 km	MPC · JPL
627255	2008 SS_{225}	—	September 26, 2008	Kitt Peak	Spacewatch	·	1.3 km	MPC · JPL
627256	2008 SF_{228}	—	September 5, 2008	Kitt Peak	Spacewatch	·	2.1 km	MPC · JPL
627257	2008 SF_{231}	—	September 5, 2008	Kitt Peak	Spacewatch	·	760 m	MPC · JPL
627258	2008 SK_{242}	—	September 29, 2008	Kitt Peak	Spacewatch	·	930 m	MPC · JPL
627259	2008 SC_{246}	—	September 23, 2008	Catalina	CSS	·	3.1 km	MPC · JPL
627260	2008 SQ_{249}	—	September 23, 2008	Kitt Peak	Spacewatch	(5)	710 m	MPC · JPL
627261	2008 SY_{257}	—	September 22, 2008	Mount Lemmon	Mount Lemmon Survey	·	2.1 km	MPC · JPL
627262	2008 SV_{259}	—	September 23, 2008	Kitt Peak	Spacewatch	·	940 m	MPC · JPL
627263	2008 SF_{261}	—	September 23, 2008	Kitt Peak	Spacewatch	·	1.1 km	MPC · JPL
627264	2008 SC_{264}	—	September 24, 2008	Kitt Peak	Spacewatch	·	580 m	MPC · JPL
627265	2008 SW_{270}	—	September 25, 2008	Kitt Peak	Spacewatch	MAS	500 m	MPC · JPL
627266	2008 SB_{274}	—	September 25, 2008	Mount Lemmon	Mount Lemmon Survey	·	1 km	MPC · JPL
627267	2008 SZ_{274}	—	September 22, 2008	Kitt Peak	Spacewatch	·	1.8 km	MPC · JPL
627268	2008 SN_{275}	—	September 23, 2008	Kitt Peak	Spacewatch	·	2.2 km	MPC · JPL
627269	2008 SC_{276}	—	September 23, 2008	Kitt Peak	Spacewatch	·	2.1 km	MPC · JPL
627270	2008 SY_{277}	—	September 26, 2008	Bergisch Gladbach	W. Bickel	·	2.3 km	MPC · JPL
627271	2008 SK_{280}	—	September 22, 2008	Socorro	LINEAR	·	930 m	MPC · JPL
627272	2008 SS_{281}	—	September 23, 2008	Mount Lemmon	Mount Lemmon Survey	MAS	550 m	MPC · JPL
627273	2008 SH_{287}	—	September 23, 2008	Kitt Peak	Spacewatch	·	910 m	MPC · JPL
627274	2008 SU_{290}	—	September 23, 2008	Kitt Peak	Spacewatch	·	1.9 km	MPC · JPL
627275	2008 SQ_{297}	—	September 22, 2008	Catalina	CSS	·	2.4 km	MPC · JPL
627276	2008 SD_{307}	—	September 29, 2008	Catalina	CSS	·	2.2 km	MPC · JPL
627277	2008 SR_{313}	—	September 28, 2008	Mount Lemmon	Mount Lemmon Survey	·	1.7 km	MPC · JPL
627278	2008 SJ_{318}	—	February 5, 2011	Haleakala	Pan-STARRS 1	·	2.3 km	MPC · JPL
627279	2008 SR_{322}	—	September 20, 2008	Mount Lemmon	Mount Lemmon Survey	MAS	490 m	MPC · JPL
627280	2008 SV_{324}	—	September 28, 2008	Mount Lemmon	Mount Lemmon Survey	·	1.6 km	MPC · JPL
627281	2008 SC_{326}	—	September 29, 2008	Mount Lemmon	Mount Lemmon Survey	·	2.2 km	MPC · JPL
627282	2008 SK_{326}	—	November 24, 2014	Mount Lemmon	Mount Lemmon Survey	EOS	1.1 km	MPC · JPL
627283	2008 SS_{332}	—	October 28, 2014	Haleakala	Pan-STARRS 1	·	2.2 km	MPC · JPL
627284	2008 SQ_{336}	—	September 23, 2008	Kitt Peak	Spacewatch	·	2.0 km	MPC · JPL
627285	2008 SO_{337}	—	September 24, 2008	Mount Lemmon	Mount Lemmon Survey	EOS	1.5 km	MPC · JPL
627286	2008 SX_{338}	—	September 24, 2008	Kitt Peak	Spacewatch	·	1.3 km	MPC · JPL
627287	2008 SW_{343}	—	September 24, 2008	Mount Lemmon	Mount Lemmon Survey	·	890 m	MPC · JPL
627288	2008 SD_{344}	—	September 23, 2008	Mount Lemmon	Mount Lemmon Survey	·	1.6 km	MPC · JPL
627289	2008 SV_{347}	—	September 4, 2008	Kitt Peak	Spacewatch	·	1.9 km	MPC · JPL
627290	2008 SF_{351}	—	September 29, 2008	Mount Lemmon	Mount Lemmon Survey	·	540 m	MPC · JPL
627291	2008 SB_{353}	—	September 20, 2008	Mount Lemmon	Mount Lemmon Survey	·	1.1 km	MPC · JPL
627292	2008 TY	—	October 2, 2008	Tiki	Teamo, N.	·	670 m	MPC · JPL
627293	2008 TH_{7}	—	October 3, 2008	La Sagra	OAM	·	2.0 km	MPC · JPL
627294	2008 TM_{13}	—	October 6, 2004	Kitt Peak	Spacewatch	·	740 m	MPC · JPL
627295	2008 TB_{17}	—	September 22, 2008	Mount Lemmon	Mount Lemmon Survey	·	860 m	MPC · JPL
627296	2008 TX_{28}	—	October 1, 2008	Mount Lemmon	Mount Lemmon Survey	V	610 m	MPC · JPL
627297	2008 TX_{29}	—	October 1, 2008	Mount Lemmon	Mount Lemmon Survey	·	1.1 km	MPC · JPL
627298	2008 TD_{35}	—	September 10, 2008	Kitt Peak	Spacewatch	·	840 m	MPC · JPL
627299	2008 TM_{38}	—	September 5, 2008	Kitt Peak	Spacewatch	·	1.9 km	MPC · JPL
627300	2008 TL_{40}	—	October 1, 2008	Mount Lemmon	Mount Lemmon Survey	·	2.1 km	MPC · JPL

== 627301–627400 ==
back to top

Designation			Discovery			Properties		Ref
Permanent	Provisional	Named after	Date	Site	Discoverer(s)	Category	Diam.	Ref
627301	2008 TX_{40}	—	October 1, 2008	Mount Lemmon	Mount Lemmon Survey	·	1.2 km	MPC · JPL
627302	2008 TH_{41}	—	October 1, 2008	Mount Lemmon	Mount Lemmon Survey	EOS	1.5 km	MPC · JPL
627303	2008 TM_{41}	—	September 24, 2008	Mount Lemmon	Mount Lemmon Survey	·	2.1 km	MPC · JPL
627304	2008 TD_{42}	—	October 1, 2008	Mount Lemmon	Mount Lemmon Survey	·	2.2 km	MPC · JPL
627305	2008 TB_{44}	—	October 1, 2008	Mount Lemmon	Mount Lemmon Survey	·	670 m	MPC · JPL
627306	2008 TQ_{44}	—	September 9, 2008	Mount Lemmon	Mount Lemmon Survey	·	2.2 km	MPC · JPL
627307	2008 TJ_{54}	—	September 24, 2008	Kitt Peak	Spacewatch	·	430 m	MPC · JPL
627308	2008 TP_{59}	—	September 24, 2008	Kitt Peak	Spacewatch	·	660 m	MPC · JPL
627309	2008 TS_{59}	—	October 2, 2008	Kitt Peak	Spacewatch	THM	1.8 km	MPC · JPL
627310	2008 TC_{65}	—	October 2, 2008	Catalina	CSS	THB	2.1 km	MPC · JPL
627311	2008 TW_{81}	—	September 20, 2008	Mount Lemmon	Mount Lemmon Survey	·	1.3 km	MPC · JPL
627312	2008 TO_{83}	—	September 25, 2008	Kitt Peak	Spacewatch	·	2.1 km	MPC · JPL
627313	2008 TG_{84}	—	September 6, 2008	Mount Lemmon	Mount Lemmon Survey	·	2.0 km	MPC · JPL
627314	2008 TN_{84}	—	October 3, 2008	Kitt Peak	Spacewatch	NYS	900 m	MPC · JPL
627315	2008 TB_{90}	—	September 7, 2008	Mount Lemmon	Mount Lemmon Survey	MAS	670 m	MPC · JPL
627316	2008 TJ_{96}	—	October 6, 2008	Kitt Peak	Spacewatch	V	600 m	MPC · JPL
627317	2008 TS_{101}	—	September 24, 2008	Kitt Peak	Spacewatch	·	690 m	MPC · JPL
627318	2008 TV_{112}	—	October 6, 2008	Catalina	CSS	·	2.1 km	MPC · JPL
627319	2008 TR_{114}	—	September 23, 2008	Kitt Peak	Spacewatch	MAR	700 m	MPC · JPL
627320	2008 TV_{114}	—	September 27, 2008	Mount Lemmon	Mount Lemmon Survey	LIX	2.8 km	MPC · JPL
627321	2008 TM_{117}	—	September 9, 2008	Mount Lemmon	Mount Lemmon Survey	·	790 m	MPC · JPL
627322	2008 TZ_{137}	—	September 23, 2008	Kitt Peak	Spacewatch	·	1.0 km	MPC · JPL
627323	2008 TA_{138}	—	September 23, 2008	Kitt Peak	Spacewatch	·	600 m	MPC · JPL
627324	2008 TP_{139}	—	September 23, 2008	Kitt Peak	Spacewatch	NYS	850 m	MPC · JPL
627325	2008 TF_{143}	—	October 9, 2008	Mount Lemmon	Mount Lemmon Survey	·	1.1 km	MPC · JPL
627326	2008 TJ_{146}	—	September 3, 2008	Kitt Peak	Spacewatch	·	2.3 km	MPC · JPL
627327	2008 TY_{146}	—	October 9, 2008	Mount Lemmon	Mount Lemmon Survey	·	2.1 km	MPC · JPL
627328	2008 TB_{153}	—	December 19, 2001	Kitt Peak	Spacewatch	·	680 m	MPC · JPL
627329	2008 TN_{153}	—	October 9, 2008	Mount Lemmon	Mount Lemmon Survey	(43176)	2.3 km	MPC · JPL
627330	2008 TY_{154}	—	October 9, 2008	Mount Lemmon	Mount Lemmon Survey	EOS	1.5 km	MPC · JPL
627331	2008 TK_{156}	—	October 9, 2008	Kitt Peak	Spacewatch	·	1.3 km	MPC · JPL
627332	2008 TM_{164}	—	October 1, 2008	Kitt Peak	Spacewatch	·	2.2 km	MPC · JPL
627333	2008 TJ_{168}	—	October 1, 2008	Mount Lemmon	Mount Lemmon Survey	·	730 m	MPC · JPL
627334	2008 TY_{168}	—	October 6, 2008	Kitt Peak	Spacewatch	·	2.3 km	MPC · JPL
627335	2008 TU_{173}	—	September 2, 2008	Kitt Peak	Spacewatch	·	670 m	MPC · JPL
627336	2008 TU_{187}	—	October 8, 2008	Kitt Peak	Spacewatch	·	1.3 km	MPC · JPL
627337	2008 TV_{192}	—	October 8, 2008	Kitt Peak	Spacewatch	·	2.0 km	MPC · JPL
627338	2008 TA_{194}	—	October 8, 2008	Kitt Peak	Spacewatch	NYS	1.2 km	MPC · JPL
627339	2008 TV_{204}	—	October 9, 2008	Mount Lemmon	Mount Lemmon Survey	LIX	2.5 km	MPC · JPL
627340	2008 TY_{209}	—	September 24, 2008	Kitt Peak	Spacewatch	·	440 m	MPC · JPL
627341	2008 TW_{211}	—	October 6, 2008	Kitt Peak	Spacewatch	NYS	930 m	MPC · JPL
627342	2008 TB_{213}	—	February 5, 2011	Haleakala	Pan-STARRS 1	·	1.9 km	MPC · JPL
627343	2008 TT_{214}	—	November 17, 2009	Mount Lemmon	Mount Lemmon Survey	·	2.0 km	MPC · JPL
627344	2008 TE_{215}	—	October 10, 2008	Mount Lemmon	Mount Lemmon Survey	·	910 m	MPC · JPL
627345	2008 TG_{218}	—	October 7, 2008	Kitt Peak	Spacewatch	EOS	1.4 km	MPC · JPL
627346	2008 TS_{218}	—	October 9, 2008	Kitt Peak	Spacewatch	·	780 m	MPC · JPL
627347	2008 TN_{220}	—	October 1, 2008	Mount Lemmon	Mount Lemmon Survey	EUN	880 m	MPC · JPL
627348	2008 TQ_{220}	—	October 1, 2008	Kitt Peak	Spacewatch	·	760 m	MPC · JPL
627349	2008 TW_{224}	—	October 10, 2008	Mount Lemmon	Mount Lemmon Survey	VER	1.9 km	MPC · JPL
627350	2008 UN_{1}	—	September 29, 2008	Catalina	CSS	·	2.3 km	MPC · JPL
627351	2008 UW_{8}	—	September 2, 2008	Kitt Peak	Spacewatch	NYS	760 m	MPC · JPL
627352	2008 UO_{12}	—	September 2, 2008	Kitt Peak	Spacewatch	·	2.1 km	MPC · JPL
627353	2008 UC_{26}	—	May 26, 2003	Kitt Peak	Spacewatch	·	980 m	MPC · JPL
627354	2008 UD_{28}	—	September 9, 2008	Mount Lemmon	Mount Lemmon Survey	THM	1.7 km	MPC · JPL
627355	2008 UM_{41}	—	October 2, 2008	Mount Lemmon	Mount Lemmon Survey	EOS	1.5 km	MPC · JPL
627356	2008 UD_{43}	—	October 8, 2008	Kitt Peak	Spacewatch	V	600 m	MPC · JPL
627357	2008 UK_{45}	—	September 25, 2008	Kitt Peak	Spacewatch	·	2.0 km	MPC · JPL
627358	2008 UV_{49}	—	October 2, 2008	Kitt Peak	Spacewatch	·	1.5 km	MPC · JPL
627359	2008 UX_{49}	—	October 20, 2008	Mount Lemmon	Mount Lemmon Survey	·	730 m	MPC · JPL
627360	2008 UK_{63}	—	October 2, 2008	Mount Lemmon	Mount Lemmon Survey	·	1.9 km	MPC · JPL
627361	2008 UY_{65}	—	October 21, 2008	Kitt Peak	Spacewatch	EUN	790 m	MPC · JPL
627362	2008 UL_{87}	—	September 19, 1995	Kitt Peak	Spacewatch	·	2.7 km	MPC · JPL
627363	2008 UR_{89}	—	September 21, 2008	Kitt Peak	Spacewatch	·	1.8 km	MPC · JPL
627364	2008 UG_{91}	—	September 23, 2008	Kitt Peak	Spacewatch	·	1.0 km	MPC · JPL
627365	2008 UL_{101}	—	October 20, 2008	Kitt Peak	Spacewatch	·	1.6 km	MPC · JPL
627366	2008 UF_{104}	—	October 20, 2008	Mount Lemmon	Mount Lemmon Survey	·	1.3 km	MPC · JPL
627367	2008 UY_{104}	—	October 6, 2008	Kitt Peak	Spacewatch	·	2.4 km	MPC · JPL
627368	2008 UZ_{106}	—	October 8, 2008	Kitt Peak	Spacewatch	NYS	950 m	MPC · JPL
627369	2008 UV_{107}	—	September 23, 2008	Mount Lemmon	Mount Lemmon Survey	·	1.9 km	MPC · JPL
627370	2008 UF_{113}	—	October 1, 2008	Mount Lemmon	Mount Lemmon Survey	·	2.7 km	MPC · JPL
627371	2008 UK_{117}	—	September 28, 2008	Mount Lemmon	Mount Lemmon Survey	·	580 m	MPC · JPL
627372	2008 UH_{120}	—	October 22, 2008	Kitt Peak	Spacewatch	·	2.0 km	MPC · JPL
627373	2008 UG_{127}	—	October 22, 2008	Kitt Peak	Spacewatch	HYG	2.5 km	MPC · JPL
627374	2008 UW_{130}	—	October 2, 2008	Kitt Peak	Spacewatch	·	1.2 km	MPC · JPL
627375	2008 UH_{131}	—	October 23, 2008	Kitt Peak	Spacewatch	·	1.1 km	MPC · JPL
627376	2008 UG_{135}	—	October 1, 2008	Mount Lemmon	Mount Lemmon Survey	·	1.2 km	MPC · JPL
627377	2008 UQ_{139}	—	October 23, 2008	Kitt Peak	Spacewatch	KON	1.6 km	MPC · JPL
627378	2008 UE_{150}	—	October 2, 2008	Kitt Peak	Spacewatch	·	2.1 km	MPC · JPL
627379	2008 UJ_{151}	—	October 23, 2008	Kitt Peak	Spacewatch	·	1.1 km	MPC · JPL
627380	2008 UB_{152}	—	October 6, 2004	Kitt Peak	Spacewatch	PHO	610 m	MPC · JPL
627381	2008 UD_{157}	—	October 23, 2008	Mount Lemmon	Mount Lemmon Survey	·	2.4 km	MPC · JPL
627382	2008 US_{161}	—	September 25, 2008	Kitt Peak	Spacewatch	·	1.8 km	MPC · JPL
627383	2008 UN_{164}	—	October 1, 2008	Kitt Peak	Spacewatch	·	650 m	MPC · JPL
627384	2008 UG_{165}	—	October 24, 2008	Kitt Peak	Spacewatch	·	1.3 km	MPC · JPL
627385	2008 UU_{166}	—	October 24, 2008	Kitt Peak	Spacewatch	·	1.3 km	MPC · JPL
627386	2008 UT_{169}	—	October 6, 2008	Mount Lemmon	Mount Lemmon Survey	·	1.7 km	MPC · JPL
627387	2008 UO_{175}	—	October 1, 2008	Kitt Peak	Spacewatch	NYS	820 m	MPC · JPL
627388	2008 UT_{175}	—	September 6, 2008	Mount Lemmon	Mount Lemmon Survey	·	1.8 km	MPC · JPL
627389	2008 UZ_{186}	—	September 29, 2008	Mount Lemmon	Mount Lemmon Survey	·	1.6 km	MPC · JPL
627390	2008 US_{190}	—	October 25, 2008	Kitt Peak	Spacewatch	·	2.4 km	MPC · JPL
627391	2008 UW_{209}	—	September 22, 2008	Kitt Peak	Spacewatch	·	2.0 km	MPC · JPL
627392	2008 UK_{217}	—	September 29, 2008	Mount Lemmon	Mount Lemmon Survey	·	2.2 km	MPC · JPL
627393	2008 UZ_{224}	—	October 25, 2008	Kitt Peak	Spacewatch	·	2.4 km	MPC · JPL
627394	2008 UN_{227}	—	October 25, 2008	Kitt Peak	Spacewatch	·	2.8 km	MPC · JPL
627395	2008 UE_{230}	—	September 26, 2008	Kitt Peak	Spacewatch	T_{j} (2.97)	4.0 km	MPC · JPL
627396	2008 UP_{234}	—	September 30, 2008	Mount Lemmon	Mount Lemmon Survey	·	1.6 km	MPC · JPL
627397	2008 UJ_{237}	—	October 26, 2008	Kitt Peak	Spacewatch	·	2.1 km	MPC · JPL
627398	2008 UT_{245}	—	October 26, 2008	Kitt Peak	Spacewatch	EOS	2.0 km	MPC · JPL
627399	2008 UN_{246}	—	August 31, 2000	Kitt Peak	Spacewatch	·	1.5 km	MPC · JPL
627400	2008 UM_{248}	—	October 26, 2008	Kitt Peak	Spacewatch	THM	1.8 km	MPC · JPL

== 627401–627500 ==
back to top

Designation			Discovery			Properties		Ref
Permanent	Provisional	Named after	Date	Site	Discoverer(s)	Category	Diam.	Ref
627401	2008 UU_{259}	—	October 23, 2008	Kitt Peak	Spacewatch	·	1.5 km	MPC · JPL
627402	2008 UD_{260}	—	October 27, 2008	Mount Lemmon	Mount Lemmon Survey	·	660 m	MPC · JPL
627403	2008 UP_{263}	—	October 27, 2008	Kitt Peak	Spacewatch	·	1.6 km	MPC · JPL
627404	2008 UB_{268}	—	October 28, 2008	Kitt Peak	Spacewatch	·	850 m	MPC · JPL
627405	2008 US_{274}	—	October 28, 2008	Kitt Peak	Spacewatch	·	1.0 km	MPC · JPL
627406	2008 UZ_{278}	—	October 7, 2008	Kitt Peak	Spacewatch	·	1.5 km	MPC · JPL
627407	2008 UF_{284}	—	October 20, 2008	Kitt Peak	Spacewatch	·	1.9 km	MPC · JPL
627408	2008 US_{286}	—	October 8, 2008	Kitt Peak	Spacewatch	NYS	940 m	MPC · JPL
627409	2008 UC_{287}	—	October 1, 2008	Kitt Peak	Spacewatch	·	1.6 km	MPC · JPL
627410	2008 UQ_{287}	—	October 1, 2008	Kitt Peak	Spacewatch	·	2.4 km	MPC · JPL
627411	2008 UM_{294}	—	October 29, 2008	Kitt Peak	Spacewatch	3:2 · SHU	4.1 km	MPC · JPL
627412	2008 UP_{308}	—	October 22, 2008	Kitt Peak	Spacewatch	·	990 m	MPC · JPL
627413	2008 UU_{317}	—	October 31, 2008	Mount Lemmon	Mount Lemmon Survey	·	2.3 km	MPC · JPL
627414	2008 UO_{321}	—	October 31, 2008	Mount Lemmon	Mount Lemmon Survey	·	2.0 km	MPC · JPL
627415	2008 UQ_{329}	—	October 2, 2008	Kitt Peak	Spacewatch	·	2.0 km	MPC · JPL
627416	2008 UJ_{330}	—	February 24, 2006	Kitt Peak	Spacewatch	NYS	910 m	MPC · JPL
627417	2008 UT_{334}	—	October 20, 2008	Kitt Peak	Spacewatch	·	1.4 km	MPC · JPL
627418	2008 UY_{334}	—	October 20, 2008	Kitt Peak	Spacewatch	·	1.2 km	MPC · JPL
627419	2008 UG_{336}	—	October 21, 2008	Mount Lemmon	Mount Lemmon Survey	·	1.1 km	MPC · JPL
627420	2008 UR_{346}	—	October 20, 2008	Mount Lemmon	Mount Lemmon Survey	·	930 m	MPC · JPL
627421	2008 UD_{347}	—	October 20, 2008	Kitt Peak	Spacewatch	MAS	560 m	MPC · JPL
627422	2008 UV_{350}	—	October 20, 2008	Kitt Peak	Spacewatch	KOR	1.2 km	MPC · JPL
627423	2008 UO_{352}	—	October 29, 2008	Mount Lemmon	Mount Lemmon Survey	·	2.3 km	MPC · JPL
627424	2008 UQ_{357}	—	October 24, 2008	Catalina	CSS	·	2.8 km	MPC · JPL
627425	2008 UY_{357}	—	October 25, 2008	Catalina	CSS	·	880 m	MPC · JPL
627426	2008 UF_{362}	—	September 12, 2002	Palomar	NEAT	·	2.2 km	MPC · JPL
627427	2008 US_{374}	—	October 21, 2008	Kitt Peak	Spacewatch	·	1.6 km	MPC · JPL
627428	2008 UX_{374}	—	October 24, 2008	Kitt Peak	Spacewatch	·	1.4 km	MPC · JPL
627429	2008 UD_{375}	—	October 26, 2008	Kitt Peak	Spacewatch	·	2.5 km	MPC · JPL
627430	2008 UT_{375}	—	October 23, 2008	Kitt Peak	Spacewatch	·	2.2 km	MPC · JPL
627431	2008 UV_{380}	—	October 22, 2012	Kitt Peak	Spacewatch	MAR	690 m	MPC · JPL
627432	2008 UR_{381}	—	October 27, 2008	Mount Lemmon	Mount Lemmon Survey	·	1.1 km	MPC · JPL
627433	2008 UB_{387}	—	June 20, 2015	Haleakala	Pan-STARRS 1	V	570 m	MPC · JPL
627434	2008 UK_{387}	—	October 29, 2008	Kitt Peak	Spacewatch	VER	2.4 km	MPC · JPL
627435 Mircearusu	2008 UO_{387}	Mircearusu	June 4, 2011	Cerro Tololo	EURONEAR	V	460 m	MPC · JPL
627436	2008 UB_{388}	—	December 12, 2014	Haleakala	Pan-STARRS 1	·	2.2 km	MPC · JPL
627437	2008 UP_{388}	—	October 27, 2008	Mount Lemmon	Mount Lemmon Survey	·	820 m	MPC · JPL
627438	2008 UW_{388}	—	August 9, 2013	Haleakala	Pan-STARRS 1	·	1.9 km	MPC · JPL
627439	2008 UX_{394}	—	April 15, 2013	Haleakala	Pan-STARRS 1	·	2.5 km	MPC · JPL
627440	2008 UV_{399}	—	April 27, 2017	Haleakala	Pan-STARRS 1	·	1.7 km	MPC · JPL
627441	2008 UC_{400}	—	October 30, 2008	Kitt Peak	Spacewatch	·	2.3 km	MPC · JPL
627442	2008 UD_{403}	—	October 26, 2008	Kitt Peak	Spacewatch	·	2.6 km	MPC · JPL
627443	2008 UA_{406}	—	October 27, 2008	Mount Lemmon	Mount Lemmon Survey	·	1.3 km	MPC · JPL
627444	2008 UB_{406}	—	October 28, 2008	Mount Lemmon	Mount Lemmon Survey	·	1.7 km	MPC · JPL
627445	2008 UC_{407}	—	October 29, 2008	Kitt Peak	Spacewatch	(5)	740 m	MPC · JPL
627446	2008 UL_{408}	—	October 20, 2008	Mount Lemmon	Mount Lemmon Survey	·	1.9 km	MPC · JPL
627447	2008 UO_{408}	—	October 26, 2008	Mount Lemmon	Mount Lemmon Survey	·	780 m	MPC · JPL
627448	2008 UL_{412}	—	October 20, 2008	Mount Lemmon	Mount Lemmon Survey	THM	1.4 km	MPC · JPL
627449	2008 UL_{418}	—	October 20, 2008	Mount Lemmon	Mount Lemmon Survey	·	1.2 km	MPC · JPL
627450	2008 VD_{8}	—	September 29, 2003	Kitt Peak	Spacewatch	·	1.4 km	MPC · JPL
627451	2008 VQ_{11}	—	September 27, 2008	Mount Lemmon	Mount Lemmon Survey	·	960 m	MPC · JPL
627452	2008 VY_{11}	—	November 2, 2008	Mount Lemmon	Mount Lemmon Survey	·	2.1 km	MPC · JPL
627453	2008 VO_{13}	—	November 8, 2008	Mount Lemmon	Mount Lemmon Survey	H	290 m	MPC · JPL
627454	2008 VS_{15}	—	September 25, 2008	Kitt Peak	Spacewatch	·	950 m	MPC · JPL
627455	2008 VA_{16}	—	October 24, 2008	Kitt Peak	Spacewatch	NYS	880 m	MPC · JPL
627456	2008 VB_{16}	—	November 1, 2008	Kitt Peak	Spacewatch	NYS	840 m	MPC · JPL
627457	2008 VE_{18}	—	October 20, 2008	Kitt Peak	Spacewatch	THM	1.5 km	MPC · JPL
627458	2008 VV_{20}	—	November 1, 2008	Mount Lemmon	Mount Lemmon Survey	·	1.8 km	MPC · JPL
627459	2008 VZ_{24}	—	September 29, 2008	Kitt Peak	Spacewatch	·	1.2 km	MPC · JPL
627460	2008 VJ_{25}	—	September 29, 2008	Kitt Peak	Spacewatch	·	1.8 km	MPC · JPL
627461	2008 VT_{25}	—	October 8, 2008	Kitt Peak	Spacewatch	EOS	1.3 km	MPC · JPL
627462	2008 VE_{41}	—	October 26, 2008	Kitt Peak	Spacewatch	·	1.1 km	MPC · JPL
627463	2008 VQ_{43}	—	November 3, 2008	Kitt Peak	Spacewatch	VER	1.9 km	MPC · JPL
627464	2008 VU_{50}	—	October 30, 2008	Kitt Peak	Spacewatch	·	1.8 km	MPC · JPL
627465	2008 VX_{50}	—	September 7, 2008	Mount Lemmon	Mount Lemmon Survey	·	1.8 km	MPC · JPL
627466	2008 VY_{58}	—	October 22, 2008	Kitt Peak	Spacewatch	·	2.3 km	MPC · JPL
627467	2008 VR_{74}	—	November 1, 2008	Mount Lemmon	Mount Lemmon Survey	·	1.4 km	MPC · JPL
627468	2008 VV_{74}	—	November 3, 2008	Kitt Peak	Spacewatch	·	1.7 km	MPC · JPL
627469	2008 VE_{78}	—	November 7, 2008	Mount Lemmon	Mount Lemmon Survey	·	2.2 km	MPC · JPL
627470	2008 VM_{80}	—	April 7, 2006	Kitt Peak	Spacewatch	·	1.1 km	MPC · JPL
627471	2008 VK_{84}	—	January 25, 2014	Haleakala	Pan-STARRS 1	·	1.1 km	MPC · JPL
627472	2008 VM_{85}	—	September 14, 2013	Haleakala	Pan-STARRS 1	·	2.4 km	MPC · JPL
627473	2008 VQ_{86}	—	November 2, 2008	Mount Lemmon	Mount Lemmon Survey	·	850 m	MPC · JPL
627474	2008 VA_{87}	—	November 7, 2008	Mount Lemmon	Mount Lemmon Survey	·	840 m	MPC · JPL
627475	2008 VY_{87}	—	October 17, 2012	Haleakala	Pan-STARRS 1	·	750 m	MPC · JPL
627476	2008 VP_{89}	—	November 9, 2008	Kitt Peak	Spacewatch	EUP	4.1 km	MPC · JPL
627477	2008 VC_{92}	—	November 2, 2008	Mount Lemmon	Mount Lemmon Survey	(5)	970 m	MPC · JPL
627478	2008 VS_{95}	—	March 18, 2010	Mount Lemmon	Mount Lemmon Survey	·	860 m	MPC · JPL
627479	2008 VC_{97}	—	August 13, 2013	Kitt Peak	Spacewatch	·	2.1 km	MPC · JPL
627480	2008 VD_{97}	—	October 18, 2012	Haleakala	Pan-STARRS 1	·	750 m	MPC · JPL
627481	2008 VJ_{99}	—	November 3, 2003	Apache Point	SDSS Collaboration	·	2.1 km	MPC · JPL
627482	2008 VL_{100}	—	November 2, 2008	Mount Lemmon	Mount Lemmon Survey	·	820 m	MPC · JPL
627483	2008 WK_{5}	—	October 28, 2008	Mount Lemmon	Mount Lemmon Survey	·	2.1 km	MPC · JPL
627484	2008 WD_{6}	—	October 1, 2008	Mount Lemmon	Mount Lemmon Survey	·	990 m	MPC · JPL
627485	2008 WO_{14}	—	October 7, 2008	Kitt Peak	Spacewatch	·	1.2 km	MPC · JPL
627486	2008 WQ_{19}	—	March 5, 2006	Kitt Peak	Spacewatch	·	1.1 km	MPC · JPL
627487	2008 WQ_{20}	—	October 27, 2008	Kitt Peak	Spacewatch	NYS	860 m	MPC · JPL
627488	2008 WT_{20}	—	May 24, 2006	Kitt Peak	Spacewatch	EOS	1.6 km	MPC · JPL
627489	2008 WK_{22}	—	September 26, 2008	Kitt Peak	Spacewatch	·	1.3 km	MPC · JPL
627490	2008 WJ_{28}	—	October 23, 2008	Kitt Peak	Spacewatch	THM	2.0 km	MPC · JPL
627491	2008 WR_{37}	—	November 17, 2008	Kitt Peak	Spacewatch	·	1.1 km	MPC · JPL
627492	2008 WA_{38}	—	October 24, 2008	Kitt Peak	Spacewatch	MAS	620 m	MPC · JPL
627493	2008 WB_{45}	—	October 26, 2008	Kitt Peak	Spacewatch	·	910 m	MPC · JPL
627494	2008 WQ_{47}	—	November 30, 2003	Kitt Peak	Spacewatch	H	370 m	MPC · JPL
627495	2008 WE_{53}	—	October 28, 2008	Kitt Peak	Spacewatch	·	1.2 km	MPC · JPL
627496	2008 WO_{56}	—	October 31, 2008	Kitt Peak	Spacewatch	THM	1.5 km	MPC · JPL
627497	2008 WZ_{56}	—	November 20, 2008	Mount Lemmon	Mount Lemmon Survey	·	1.2 km	MPC · JPL
627498	2008 WY_{57}	—	October 23, 2008	Kitt Peak	Spacewatch	THM	2.1 km	MPC · JPL
627499	2008 WM_{65}	—	November 8, 2008	Mount Lemmon	Mount Lemmon Survey	EOS	1.4 km	MPC · JPL
627500	2008 WO_{68}	—	November 18, 2008	Kitt Peak	Spacewatch	·	1.5 km	MPC · JPL

== 627501–627600 ==
back to top

Designation			Discovery			Properties		Ref
Permanent	Provisional	Named after	Date	Site	Discoverer(s)	Category	Diam.	Ref
627501	2008 WY_{71}	—	September 5, 2008	Kitt Peak	Spacewatch	·	2.2 km	MPC · JPL
627502	2008 WL_{74}	—	November 19, 2008	Mount Lemmon	Mount Lemmon Survey	·	950 m	MPC · JPL
627503	2008 WX_{78}	—	November 20, 2008	Kitt Peak	Spacewatch	·	2.1 km	MPC · JPL
627504	2008 WB_{86}	—	November 20, 2008	Kitt Peak	Spacewatch	·	1.5 km	MPC · JPL
627505	2008 WP_{91}	—	November 8, 2008	Mount Lemmon	Mount Lemmon Survey	·	2.7 km	MPC · JPL
627506	2008 WP_{99}	—	March 10, 2005	Mount Lemmon	Mount Lemmon Survey	·	1.2 km	MPC · JPL
627507	2008 WV_{110}	—	November 3, 2008	Kitt Peak	Spacewatch	MAS	630 m	MPC · JPL
627508	2008 WM_{111}	—	November 30, 2008	Kitt Peak	Spacewatch	·	1.1 km	MPC · JPL
627509	2008 WG_{115}	—	November 8, 2008	Kitt Peak	Spacewatch	NYS	740 m	MPC · JPL
627510	2008 WS_{120}	—	November 30, 2008	Kitt Peak	Spacewatch	·	2.1 km	MPC · JPL
627511	2008 WH_{128}	—	November 19, 2008	Kitt Peak	Spacewatch	THM	2.4 km	MPC · JPL
627512	2008 WY_{130}	—	November 19, 2008	Kitt Peak	Spacewatch	(1118)	3.0 km	MPC · JPL
627513	2008 WD_{132}	—	October 10, 2008	Mount Lemmon	Mount Lemmon Survey	·	1.6 km	MPC · JPL
627514	2008 WV_{132}	—	November 26, 2008	La Sagra	OAM	·	1.5 km	MPC · JPL
627515	2008 WL_{137}	—	November 22, 2008	Socorro	LINEAR	·	3.2 km	MPC · JPL
627516	2008 WX_{150}	—	November 9, 2013	Haleakala	Pan-STARRS 1	·	1.7 km	MPC · JPL
627517	2008 WS_{151}	—	May 5, 2014	Kitt Peak	Spacewatch	·	550 m	MPC · JPL
627518	2008 WD_{153}	—	December 3, 2014	Haleakala	Pan-STARRS 1	·	2.9 km	MPC · JPL
627519	2008 WV_{153}	—	November 21, 2008	Kitt Peak	Spacewatch	·	2.2 km	MPC · JPL
627520 Corbey	2008 WH_{154}	Corbey	September 4, 2013	Piszkéstető	M. Langbroek, K. Sárneczky	·	2.0 km	MPC · JPL
627521	2008 WJ_{157}	—	November 24, 2008	Kitt Peak	Spacewatch	·	900 m	MPC · JPL
627522	2008 WO_{158}	—	November 21, 2008	Kitt Peak	Spacewatch	·	1.1 km	MPC · JPL
627523	2008 XE_{2}	—	December 4, 2008	Catalina	CSS	AMO	500 m	MPC · JPL
627524	2008 XL_{2}	—	November 19, 2008	Catalina	CSS	·	790 m	MPC · JPL
627525	2008 XD_{6}	—	December 4, 2008	Socorro	LINEAR	·	2.2 km	MPC · JPL
627526	2008 XC_{7}	—	November 26, 2008	La Sagra	OAM	·	1.3 km	MPC · JPL
627527	2008 XK_{12}	—	October 26, 2008	Mount Lemmon	Mount Lemmon Survey	·	1.0 km	MPC · JPL
627528	2008 XP_{12}	—	November 8, 2008	Mount Lemmon	Mount Lemmon Survey	·	810 m	MPC · JPL
627529	2008 XK_{14}	—	October 19, 2008	Kitt Peak	Spacewatch	·	2.8 km	MPC · JPL
627530	2008 XF_{23}	—	November 21, 2008	Mount Lemmon	Mount Lemmon Survey	PHO	720 m	MPC · JPL
627531	2008 XS_{34}	—	November 20, 2008	Mount Lemmon	Mount Lemmon Survey	·	1.9 km	MPC · JPL
627532	2008 XQ_{35}	—	October 25, 2008	Kitt Peak	Spacewatch	·	1.8 km	MPC · JPL
627533	2008 XW_{36}	—	April 18, 2005	Kitt Peak	Spacewatch	·	2.5 km	MPC · JPL
627534	2008 XY_{37}	—	November 24, 2008	Kitt Peak	Spacewatch	·	2.3 km	MPC · JPL
627535	2008 XT_{42}	—	November 24, 2008	Kitt Peak	Spacewatch	·	1.5 km	MPC · JPL
627536	2008 XL_{47}	—	December 2, 2008	Kitt Peak	Spacewatch	·	2.8 km	MPC · JPL
627537	2008 XM_{56}	—	October 23, 2013	Mount Lemmon	Mount Lemmon Survey	·	2.1 km	MPC · JPL
627538	2008 XP_{58}	—	January 6, 2013	Kitt Peak	Spacewatch	·	920 m	MPC · JPL
627539	2008 XF_{59}	—	November 24, 2008	Kitt Peak	Spacewatch	·	1.3 km	MPC · JPL
627540	2008 XT_{59}	—	December 6, 2008	Mount Lemmon	Mount Lemmon Survey	·	2.4 km	MPC · JPL
627541	2008 XU_{61}	—	May 4, 2014	Haleakala	Pan-STARRS 1	V	550 m	MPC · JPL
627542	2008 XB_{62}	—	November 4, 2013	Nogales	M. Schwartz, P. R. Holvorcem	·	2.3 km	MPC · JPL
627543	2008 XD_{62}	—	July 8, 2018	Haleakala	Pan-STARRS 2	EOS	1.6 km	MPC · JPL
627544	2008 XA_{63}	—	September 1, 2013	Haleakala	Pan-STARRS 1	·	2.7 km	MPC · JPL
627545	2008 YC_{1}	—	December 19, 2008	La Sagra	OAM	·	920 m	MPC · JPL
627546	2008 YU_{10}	—	October 23, 2008	Mount Lemmon	Mount Lemmon Survey	·	2.3 km	MPC · JPL
627547	2008 YD_{25}	—	December 20, 2008	La Sagra	OAM	·	3.3 km	MPC · JPL
627548	2008 YE_{39}	—	October 30, 2008	Kitt Peak	Spacewatch	·	2.4 km	MPC · JPL
627549	2008 YF_{46}	—	December 29, 2008	Mount Lemmon	Mount Lemmon Survey	·	1.2 km	MPC · JPL
627550	2008 YF_{58}	—	December 22, 2008	Kitt Peak	Spacewatch	·	1.1 km	MPC · JPL
627551	2008 YF_{68}	—	December 30, 2008	Mount Lemmon	Mount Lemmon Survey	·	2.5 km	MPC · JPL
627552	2008 YK_{68}	—	December 21, 2008	Catalina	CSS	H	470 m	MPC · JPL
627553	2008 YU_{74}	—	December 4, 2008	Mount Lemmon	Mount Lemmon Survey	·	680 m	MPC · JPL
627554	2008 YD_{83}	—	December 31, 2008	Kitt Peak	Spacewatch	·	1.1 km	MPC · JPL
627555	2008 YQ_{87}	—	December 29, 2008	Kitt Peak	Spacewatch	·	2.6 km	MPC · JPL
627556	2008 YE_{94}	—	December 21, 2008	Mount Lemmon	Mount Lemmon Survey	EUN	910 m	MPC · JPL
627557	2008 YK_{99}	—	December 29, 2008	Kitt Peak	Spacewatch	·	2.3 km	MPC · JPL
627558	2008 YN_{99}	—	December 29, 2008	Kitt Peak	Spacewatch	·	2.3 km	MPC · JPL
627559	2008 YL_{102}	—	December 29, 2008	Kitt Peak	Spacewatch	·	750 m	MPC · JPL
627560	2008 YD_{108}	—	December 29, 2008	Kitt Peak	Spacewatch	·	1.7 km	MPC · JPL
627561	2008 YY_{110}	—	December 2, 2008	Mount Lemmon	Mount Lemmon Survey	·	740 m	MPC · JPL
627562	2008 YT_{115}	—	December 29, 2008	Kitt Peak	Spacewatch	·	1.6 km	MPC · JPL
627563	2008 YN_{117}	—	December 21, 2008	Kitt Peak	Spacewatch	·	860 m	MPC · JPL
627564	2008 YE_{126}	—	December 22, 2008	Kitt Peak	Spacewatch	LIX	2.3 km	MPC · JPL
627565	2008 YY_{128}	—	December 31, 2008	Kitt Peak	Spacewatch	·	1.5 km	MPC · JPL
627566	2008 YV_{144}	—	December 30, 2008	Kitt Peak	Spacewatch	·	2.2 km	MPC · JPL
627567	2008 YT_{151}	—	December 22, 2008	Mount Lemmon	Mount Lemmon Survey	PHO	600 m	MPC · JPL
627568	2008 YJ_{156}	—	December 29, 2008	Kitt Peak	Spacewatch	MAS	580 m	MPC · JPL
627569	2008 YW_{163}	—	December 26, 2008	Mount Nyukasa	Japan Aerospace Exploration Agency	·	1.8 km	MPC · JPL
627570	2008 YH_{166}	—	February 12, 2004	Kitt Peak	Spacewatch	·	1.8 km	MPC · JPL
627571	2008 YN_{171}	—	January 15, 2009	Kitt Peak	Spacewatch	·	2.5 km	MPC · JPL
627572	2008 YJ_{173}	—	October 2, 2015	Mount Lemmon	Mount Lemmon Survey	·	1.3 km	MPC · JPL
627573	2008 YC_{178}	—	December 31, 2008	Kitt Peak	Spacewatch	·	2.1 km	MPC · JPL
627574	2008 YH_{179}	—	October 29, 2008	Kitt Peak	Spacewatch	·	2.5 km	MPC · JPL
627575	2008 YW_{181}	—	December 22, 2008	Kitt Peak	Spacewatch	·	1.7 km	MPC · JPL
627576	2008 YO_{185}	—	July 24, 2015	Haleakala	Pan-STARRS 1	·	720 m	MPC · JPL
627577	2008 YY_{185}	—	December 11, 2012	Mount Lemmon	Mount Lemmon Survey	(5)	740 m	MPC · JPL
627578	2008 YS_{187}	—	December 30, 2008	Kitt Peak	Spacewatch	·	1.2 km	MPC · JPL
627579	2008 YA_{188}	—	October 1, 2000	Apache Point	SDSS Collaboration	·	1.1 km	MPC · JPL
627580	2008 YP_{188}	—	December 21, 2008	Mount Lemmon	Mount Lemmon Survey	·	1.5 km	MPC · JPL
627581	2008 YF_{189}	—	December 22, 2008	Kitt Peak	Spacewatch	·	1.8 km	MPC · JPL
627582	2008 YW_{189}	—	December 29, 2008	Mount Lemmon	Mount Lemmon Survey	·	2.4 km	MPC · JPL
627583	2008 YC_{190}	—	December 30, 2008	Mount Lemmon	Mount Lemmon Survey	·	2.3 km	MPC · JPL
627584	2008 YR_{190}	—	December 22, 2008	Kitt Peak	Spacewatch	·	860 m	MPC · JPL
627585	2008 YZ_{190}	—	December 21, 2008	Mount Lemmon	Mount Lemmon Survey	HYG	2.1 km	MPC · JPL
627586	2008 YV_{193}	—	December 30, 2008	Kitt Peak	Spacewatch	·	2.2 km	MPC · JPL
627587	2009 AE_{5}	—	December 22, 2008	Kitt Peak	Spacewatch	·	1.7 km	MPC · JPL
627588	2009 AT_{28}	—	December 29, 2008	Mount Lemmon	Mount Lemmon Survey	LIX	2.8 km	MPC · JPL
627589	2009 AQ_{42}	—	January 2, 2009	Kitt Peak	Spacewatch	·	2.8 km	MPC · JPL
627590	2009 AE_{53}	—	January 2, 2009	Kitt Peak	Spacewatch	·	2.3 km	MPC · JPL
627591	2009 BJ_{22}	—	January 17, 2009	Kitt Peak	Spacewatch	EUP	2.4 km	MPC · JPL
627592	2009 BO_{40}	—	January 16, 2009	Kitt Peak	Spacewatch	·	1.1 km	MPC · JPL
627593	2009 BF_{50}	—	January 1, 2009	Mount Lemmon	Mount Lemmon Survey	·	2.4 km	MPC · JPL
627594	2009 BF_{64}	—	January 1, 2009	Mount Lemmon	Mount Lemmon Survey	·	810 m	MPC · JPL
627595	2009 BZ_{66}	—	January 20, 2009	Kitt Peak	Spacewatch	·	2.2 km	MPC · JPL
627596	2009 BP_{71}	—	November 8, 2008	Mount Lemmon	Mount Lemmon Survey	·	2.2 km	MPC · JPL
627597	2009 BL_{73}	—	December 21, 2008	Kitt Peak	Spacewatch	·	1.8 km	MPC · JPL
627598	2009 BD_{90}	—	November 12, 2007	Mount Lemmon	Mount Lemmon Survey	·	2.9 km	MPC · JPL
627599	2009 BV_{109}	—	January 18, 2009	Mount Lemmon	Mount Lemmon Survey	EUP	3.3 km	MPC · JPL
627600	2009 BJ_{110}	—	January 31, 2009	Mount Lemmon	Mount Lemmon Survey	·	2.7 km	MPC · JPL

== 627601–627700 ==
back to top

Designation			Discovery			Properties		Ref
Permanent	Provisional	Named after	Date	Site	Discoverer(s)	Category	Diam.	Ref
627601	2009 BT_{118}	—	January 20, 2009	Kitt Peak	Spacewatch	·	2.2 km	MPC · JPL
627602	2009 BQ_{121}	—	January 31, 2009	Kitt Peak	Spacewatch	·	2.3 km	MPC · JPL
627603	2009 BB_{135}	—	January 29, 2009	Kitt Peak	Spacewatch	·	1 km	MPC · JPL
627604	2009 BJ_{135}	—	January 1, 2009	Kitt Peak	Spacewatch	VER	2.4 km	MPC · JPL
627605	2009 BR_{155}	—	January 1, 2009	Mount Lemmon	Mount Lemmon Survey	·	1.2 km	MPC · JPL
627606	2009 BZ_{160}	—	January 18, 2009	Kitt Peak	Spacewatch	·	2.3 km	MPC · JPL
627607	2009 BV_{168}	—	January 24, 2009	Cerro Burek	Burek, Cerro	·	2.3 km	MPC · JPL
627608	2009 BZ_{180}	—	January 16, 2009	Kitt Peak	Spacewatch	EUN	1 km	MPC · JPL
627609	2009 BC_{185}	—	January 20, 2009	Mount Lemmon	Mount Lemmon Survey	·	2.9 km	MPC · JPL
627610	2009 BG_{197}	—	February 9, 2013	Haleakala	Pan-STARRS 1	·	860 m	MPC · JPL
627611	2009 BC_{199}	—	September 17, 2012	Mount Lemmon	Mount Lemmon Survey	·	2.8 km	MPC · JPL
627612	2009 BT_{203}	—	January 17, 2009	Kitt Peak	Spacewatch	·	2.4 km	MPC · JPL
627613	2009 BX_{203}	—	January 16, 2009	Mount Lemmon	Mount Lemmon Survey	·	2.9 km	MPC · JPL
627614	2009 BF_{205}	—	January 31, 2009	Kitt Peak	Spacewatch	VER	2.2 km	MPC · JPL
627615	2009 BZ_{205}	—	January 20, 2009	Catalina	CSS	·	2.6 km	MPC · JPL
627616	2009 BG_{211}	—	January 16, 2009	Mount Lemmon	Mount Lemmon Survey	·	750 m	MPC · JPL
627617	2009 CR_{8}	—	January 16, 2009	Mount Lemmon	Mount Lemmon Survey	·	2.3 km	MPC · JPL
627618	2009 CP_{26}	—	February 1, 2009	Kitt Peak	Spacewatch	·	2.3 km	MPC · JPL
627619	2009 CX_{72}	—	April 11, 2010	Kitt Peak	Spacewatch	·	2.8 km	MPC · JPL
627620	2009 CR_{76}	—	February 14, 2009	Mount Lemmon	Mount Lemmon Survey	·	840 m	MPC · JPL
627621	2009 DH_{25}	—	February 21, 2009	Mount Lemmon	Mount Lemmon Survey	·	1.2 km	MPC · JPL
627622	2009 DK_{26}	—	January 19, 2009	Mount Lemmon	Mount Lemmon Survey	·	2.2 km	MPC · JPL
627623	2009 DR_{29}	—	February 23, 2009	Calar Alto	F. Hormuth	·	1.5 km	MPC · JPL
627624	2009 DE_{32}	—	February 20, 2009	Kitt Peak	Spacewatch	(5)	1.0 km	MPC · JPL
627625	2009 DA_{37}	—	February 19, 2009	Kitt Peak	Spacewatch	T_{j} (2.96)	2.8 km	MPC · JPL
627626	2009 DD_{67}	—	February 3, 2009	Kitt Peak	Spacewatch	·	2.9 km	MPC · JPL
627627	2009 DU_{71}	—	January 25, 2009	Kitt Peak	Spacewatch	·	2.5 km	MPC · JPL
627628	2009 DB_{98}	—	February 26, 2009	Kitt Peak	Spacewatch	·	2.3 km	MPC · JPL
627629	2009 DR_{148}	—	July 28, 2011	Haleakala	Pan-STARRS 1	·	1.0 km	MPC · JPL
627630	2009 DV_{150}	—	January 31, 2009	Kitt Peak	Spacewatch	·	2.5 km	MPC · JPL
627631	2009 DC_{155}	—	February 22, 2009	Kitt Peak	Spacewatch	TIR	2.1 km	MPC · JPL
627632	2009 EG_{9}	—	January 25, 2009	Catalina	CSS	EUP	2.6 km	MPC · JPL
627633	2009 EP_{13}	—	March 15, 2009	Kitt Peak	Spacewatch	(5)	890 m	MPC · JPL
627634	2009 EZ_{13}	—	November 2, 2007	Mount Lemmon	Mount Lemmon Survey	·	1.1 km	MPC · JPL
627635	2009 EH_{26}	—	September 12, 2007	Mount Lemmon	Mount Lemmon Survey	·	2.1 km	MPC · JPL
627636	2009 EM_{31}	—	September 26, 2011	Haleakala	Pan-STARRS 1	·	820 m	MPC · JPL
627637	2009 EB_{33}	—	March 2, 2009	Mount Lemmon	Mount Lemmon Survey	·	2.7 km	MPC · JPL
627638	2009 ES_{33}	—	January 23, 2015	Haleakala	Pan-STARRS 1	·	2.7 km	MPC · JPL
627639	2009 ET_{34}	—	February 14, 2013	Haleakala	Pan-STARRS 1	·	1.1 km	MPC · JPL
627640	2009 EU_{34}	—	March 3, 2009	Mount Lemmon	Mount Lemmon Survey	HNS	920 m	MPC · JPL
627641	2009 EY_{35}	—	May 7, 2014	Haleakala	Pan-STARRS 1	·	1.1 km	MPC · JPL
627642	2009 FX_{84}	—	March 3, 2013	Kitt Peak	Spacewatch	KON	1.7 km	MPC · JPL
627643	2009 FM_{89}	—	March 18, 2009	Mount Lemmon	Mount Lemmon Survey	·	1.1 km	MPC · JPL
627644	2009 HJ_{93}	—	April 30, 2009	Kitt Peak	Spacewatch	·	1.3 km	MPC · JPL
627645	2009 HG_{112}	—	March 5, 2013	Mount Lemmon	Mount Lemmon Survey	·	1.4 km	MPC · JPL
627646	2009 HS_{119}	—	April 20, 2009	Mount Lemmon	Mount Lemmon Survey	·	510 m	MPC · JPL
627647	2009 JT	—	May 1, 2009	Cerro Burek	Burek, Cerro	·	490 m	MPC · JPL
627648	2009 JL_{13}	—	September 14, 2006	Kitt Peak	Spacewatch	·	1.7 km	MPC · JPL
627649	2009 JB_{18}	—	April 18, 2009	Mount Lemmon	Mount Lemmon Survey	·	560 m	MPC · JPL
627650	2009 LF_{4}	—	May 4, 2009	Mount Lemmon	Mount Lemmon Survey	·	580 m	MPC · JPL
627651	2009 LM_{7}	—	June 15, 2009	Mount Lemmon	Mount Lemmon Survey	·	2.1 km	MPC · JPL
627652	2009 QG_{18}	—	December 13, 2006	Mount Lemmon	Mount Lemmon Survey	·	800 m	MPC · JPL
627653	2009 QD_{42}	—	August 16, 2009	Kitt Peak	Spacewatch	·	1.5 km	MPC · JPL
627654	2009 QV_{43}	—	August 27, 2009	Kitt Peak	Spacewatch	·	1.6 km	MPC · JPL
627655	2009 RO_{38}	—	September 15, 2009	Kitt Peak	Spacewatch	KOR	1.2 km	MPC · JPL
627656	2009 RK_{58}	—	September 15, 2009	Kitt Peak	Spacewatch	·	820 m	MPC · JPL
627657	2009 RG_{79}	—	July 12, 2016	Mount Lemmon	Mount Lemmon Survey	·	780 m	MPC · JPL
627658	2009 SD_{23}	—	September 16, 2009	Kitt Peak	Spacewatch	·	1.6 km	MPC · JPL
627659	2009 SP_{23}	—	August 16, 2009	Kitt Peak	Spacewatch	·	1.4 km	MPC · JPL
627660	2009 SP_{28}	—	September 16, 2009	Kitt Peak	Spacewatch	·	1.4 km	MPC · JPL
627661	2009 SP_{62}	—	September 17, 2009	Mount Lemmon	Mount Lemmon Survey	·	1.2 km	MPC · JPL
627662	2009 SW_{118}	—	September 18, 2009	Kitt Peak	Spacewatch	·	790 m	MPC · JPL
627663	2009 SL_{167}	—	September 23, 2009	Mount Lemmon	Mount Lemmon Survey	·	1.0 km	MPC · JPL
627664	2009 SE_{194}	—	September 12, 2009	Kitt Peak	Spacewatch	·	790 m	MPC · JPL
627665	2009 SL_{263}	—	September 23, 2009	Mount Lemmon	Mount Lemmon Survey	·	600 m	MPC · JPL
627666	2009 SZ_{270}	—	September 24, 2009	Kitt Peak	Spacewatch	·	660 m	MPC · JPL
627667	2009 SQ_{294}	—	November 5, 2005	Kitt Peak	Spacewatch	HOF	2.6 km	MPC · JPL
627668	2009 SM_{301}	—	September 16, 2009	Mount Lemmon	Mount Lemmon Survey	·	820 m	MPC · JPL
627669	2009 SV_{317}	—	August 16, 2009	Kitt Peak	Spacewatch	·	1.4 km	MPC · JPL
627670	2009 SQ_{322}	—	November 6, 2005	Mount Lemmon	Mount Lemmon Survey	HOF	2.2 km	MPC · JPL
627671	2009 SZ_{362}	—	September 17, 2009	Kitt Peak	Spacewatch	·	660 m	MPC · JPL
627672	2009 SV_{383}	—	November 28, 2013	Mount Lemmon	Mount Lemmon Survey	·	800 m	MPC · JPL
627673	2009 SB_{391}	—	July 11, 2016	Haleakala	Pan-STARRS 1	·	610 m	MPC · JPL
627674	2009 SE_{393}	—	September 17, 2009	Mount Lemmon	Mount Lemmon Survey	·	750 m	MPC · JPL
627675	2009 SJ_{394}	—	September 20, 2009	Kitt Peak	Spacewatch	KOR	920 m	MPC · JPL
627676	2009 TD_{15}	—	September 27, 2009	Catalina	CSS	·	2.1 km	MPC · JPL
627677	2009 TK_{31}	—	March 31, 2008	Mount Lemmon	Mount Lemmon Survey	·	720 m	MPC · JPL
627678	2009 TT_{50}	—	October 14, 2009	Mount Lemmon	Mount Lemmon Survey	·	830 m	MPC · JPL
627679	2009 TW_{51}	—	February 9, 2011	Mount Lemmon	Mount Lemmon Survey	·	1.7 km	MPC · JPL
627680	2009 TM_{54}	—	October 14, 2009	Mount Lemmon	Mount Lemmon Survey	·	600 m	MPC · JPL
627681	2009 UW_{42}	—	November 1, 2014	Kitt Peak	Spacewatch	·	1.3 km	MPC · JPL
627682	2009 UL_{84}	—	October 23, 2009	Mount Lemmon	Mount Lemmon Survey	·	870 m	MPC · JPL
627683	2009 UM_{120}	—	September 18, 2009	Kitt Peak	Spacewatch	·	1.5 km	MPC · JPL
627684	2009 UC_{122}	—	January 27, 2007	Kitt Peak	Spacewatch	·	660 m	MPC · JPL
627685	2009 UF_{170}	—	November 17, 2010	Mount Lemmon	Mount Lemmon Survey	T_{j} (2.97) · 3:2	4.5 km	MPC · JPL
627686	2009 UO_{174}	—	October 25, 2009	Kitt Peak	Spacewatch	·	760 m	MPC · JPL
627687	2009 VK_{29}	—	November 9, 2009	Kitt Peak	Spacewatch	·	1.0 km	MPC · JPL
627688	2009 VH_{32}	—	July 5, 2005	Palomar	NEAT	·	790 m	MPC · JPL
627689	2009 VY_{33}	—	November 10, 2009	Mount Lemmon	Mount Lemmon Survey	·	680 m	MPC · JPL
627690	2009 VA_{71}	—	November 9, 2009	Kitt Peak	Spacewatch	·	2.3 km	MPC · JPL
627691	2009 VE_{105}	—	October 12, 2009	Mount Lemmon	Mount Lemmon Survey	·	910 m	MPC · JPL
627692	2009 VF_{115}	—	September 21, 2009	Mount Lemmon	Mount Lemmon Survey	·	870 m	MPC · JPL
627693	2009 VG_{117}	—	January 9, 2007	Mount Lemmon	Mount Lemmon Survey	NYS	960 m	MPC · JPL
627694	2009 VM_{120}	—	July 12, 2013	Haleakala	Pan-STARRS 1	·	1.4 km	MPC · JPL
627695	2009 VD_{123}	—	September 18, 2009	Mount Lemmon	Mount Lemmon Survey	·	1.6 km	MPC · JPL
627696	2009 VS_{125}	—	November 11, 2009	Kitt Peak	Spacewatch	·	1.6 km	MPC · JPL
627697	2009 WS_{14}	—	April 22, 2007	Kitt Peak	Spacewatch	KOR	1.4 km	MPC · JPL
627698	2009 WG_{41}	—	July 30, 2008	Mount Lemmon	Mount Lemmon Survey	KOR	1.2 km	MPC · JPL
627699	2009 WJ_{49}	—	November 19, 2009	Mount Lemmon	Mount Lemmon Survey	3:2	3.4 km	MPC · JPL
627700	2009 WS_{114}	—	October 26, 2009	Kitt Peak	Spacewatch	PHO	1.0 km	MPC · JPL

== 627701–627800 ==
back to top

Designation			Discovery			Properties		Ref
Permanent	Provisional	Named after	Date	Site	Discoverer(s)	Category	Diam.	Ref
627701	2009 WJ_{120}	—	September 20, 2003	Palomar	NEAT	·	2.5 km	MPC · JPL
627702	2009 WX_{121}	—	November 20, 2009	Kitt Peak	Spacewatch	·	620 m	MPC · JPL
627703	2009 WR_{174}	—	November 22, 2009	Kitt Peak	Spacewatch	·	1.0 km	MPC · JPL
627704	2009 WT_{176}	—	November 11, 2009	Kitt Peak	Spacewatch	·	820 m	MPC · JPL
627705	2009 WM_{252}	—	November 9, 2009	Kitt Peak	Spacewatch	·	3.0 km	MPC · JPL
627706	2009 WH_{264}	—	January 26, 2006	Mount Lemmon	Mount Lemmon Survey	KOR	1.2 km	MPC · JPL
627707	2009 WQ_{279}	—	November 17, 2009	Mount Lemmon	Mount Lemmon Survey	·	1.5 km	MPC · JPL
627708	2010 AD_{141}	—	January 11, 2010	Kitt Peak	Spacewatch	NYS	940 m	MPC · JPL
627709	2010 AE_{163}	—	January 15, 2010	Mount Lemmon	Mount Lemmon Survey	·	2.0 km	MPC · JPL
627710	2010 CN_{103}	—	January 23, 2006	Mount Lemmon	Mount Lemmon Survey	NYS	940 m	MPC · JPL
627711	2010 DT_{98}	—	March 14, 2015	Mount Lemmon	Mount Lemmon Survey	·	2.7 km	MPC · JPL
627712	2010 DF_{109}	—	October 25, 2013	Kitt Peak	Spacewatch	·	1.4 km	MPC · JPL
627713	2010 EN_{139}	—	March 12, 2010	Kitt Peak	Spacewatch	·	800 m	MPC · JPL
627714	2010 FJ_{18}	—	March 18, 2010	Mount Lemmon	Mount Lemmon Survey	EOS	1.5 km	MPC · JPL
627715	2010 FG_{20}	—	February 14, 2010	Kitt Peak	Spacewatch	·	730 m	MPC · JPL
627716	2010 GE_{107}	—	April 8, 2010	Kitt Peak	Spacewatch	·	530 m	MPC · JPL
627717	2010 GC_{200}	—	October 3, 2013	Kitt Peak	Spacewatch	·	1.6 km	MPC · JPL
627718	2010 JT_{147}	—	October 28, 2008	Mount Lemmon	Mount Lemmon Survey	H	350 m	MPC · JPL
627719	2010 JM_{173}	—	October 18, 2012	Haleakala	Pan-STARRS 1	·	2.7 km	MPC · JPL
627720	2010 NW_{147}	—	March 13, 2016	Haleakala	Pan-STARRS 1	·	500 m	MPC · JPL
627721	2010 QH_{5}	—	August 30, 2010	La Sagra	OAM	·	1.6 km	MPC · JPL
627722	2010 RD_{17}	—	September 2, 2010	Socorro	LINEAR	H	390 m	MPC · JPL
627723	2010 RH_{49}	—	September 4, 2010	Socorro	LINEAR	·	1.1 km	MPC · JPL
627724	2010 RK_{68}	—	October 24, 2007	Mount Lemmon	Mount Lemmon Survey	·	530 m	MPC · JPL
627725	2010 RR_{89}	—	September 11, 2010	Mount Lemmon	Mount Lemmon Survey	·	1.5 km	MPC · JPL
627726	2010 RD_{115}	—	September 11, 2010	Kitt Peak	Spacewatch	·	1.0 km	MPC · JPL
627727	2010 RC_{129}	—	September 15, 2010	Kitt Peak	Spacewatch	·	500 m	MPC · JPL
627728	2010 RY_{129}	—	September 13, 2010	La Sagra	OAM	·	1.1 km	MPC · JPL
627729	2010 RM_{133}	—	September 15, 2010	Catalina	CSS	·	1.3 km	MPC · JPL
627730	2010 RN_{152}	—	September 15, 2010	Kitt Peak	Spacewatch	MIS	1.7 km	MPC · JPL
627731	2010 RH_{198}	—	January 29, 2017	Haleakala	Pan-STARRS 1	MAR	860 m	MPC · JPL
627732	2010 RS_{198}	—	August 10, 2010	Kitt Peak	Spacewatch	·	1.0 km	MPC · JPL
627733	2010 RM_{210}	—	September 4, 2010	Mount Lemmon	Mount Lemmon Survey	·	550 m	MPC · JPL
627734	2010 SR_{4}	—	November 21, 2007	Mount Lemmon	Mount Lemmon Survey	·	490 m	MPC · JPL
627735	2010 SQ_{19}	—	September 27, 2010	Kitt Peak	Spacewatch	·	1.2 km	MPC · JPL
627736	2010 SL_{21}	—	September 10, 2010	Kitt Peak	Spacewatch	·	480 m	MPC · JPL
627737	2010 ST_{21}	—	September 4, 2010	Kitt Peak	Spacewatch	·	560 m	MPC · JPL
627738	2010 SR_{37}	—	September 15, 2010	Mount Lemmon	Mount Lemmon Survey	·	1.3 km	MPC · JPL
627739	2010 SG_{55}	—	September 16, 2010	Kitt Peak	Spacewatch	·	410 m	MPC · JPL
627740	2010 TX_{13}	—	September 18, 2010	Kitt Peak	Spacewatch	·	1.2 km	MPC · JPL
627741	2010 TM_{37}	—	October 5, 2010	La Sagra	OAM	·	1.7 km	MPC · JPL
627742	2010 TK_{72}	—	September 10, 2010	Kitt Peak	Spacewatch	·	400 m	MPC · JPL
627743	2010 TA_{127}	—	October 10, 2010	Mount Lemmon	Mount Lemmon Survey	·	1.1 km	MPC · JPL
627744	2010 TE_{138}	—	September 16, 2010	Mount Lemmon	Mount Lemmon Survey	·	1.5 km	MPC · JPL
627745	2010 TG_{147}	—	October 11, 2010	Mount Lemmon	Mount Lemmon Survey	·	1.2 km	MPC · JPL
627746	2010 TL_{147}	—	October 11, 2010	Mount Lemmon	Mount Lemmon Survey	·	930 m	MPC · JPL
627747	2010 TF_{150}	—	October 1, 2010	La Sagra	OAM	·	1.3 km	MPC · JPL
627748	2010 TZ_{181}	—	October 15, 2001	Apache Point	SDSS Collaboration	·	1.2 km	MPC · JPL
627749	2010 TJ_{186}	—	September 8, 2010	Kitt Peak	Spacewatch	·	1.1 km	MPC · JPL
627750	2010 TX_{198}	—	October 13, 2010	Mount Lemmon	Mount Lemmon Survey	·	1.4 km	MPC · JPL
627751	2010 TT_{200}	—	October 10, 2010	Mount Lemmon	Mount Lemmon Survey	·	450 m	MPC · JPL
627752	2010 TA_{202}	—	October 9, 2010	Kitt Peak	Spacewatch	·	430 m	MPC · JPL
627753	2010 TY_{203}	—	July 1, 2014	Haleakala	Pan-STARRS 1	·	1.1 km	MPC · JPL
627754	2010 TP_{205}	—	October 12, 2010	Mount Lemmon	Mount Lemmon Survey	·	490 m	MPC · JPL
627755	2010 TW_{206}	—	October 10, 2010	Kitt Peak	Spacewatch	·	540 m	MPC · JPL
627756	2010 TD_{220}	—	October 11, 2010	Catalina	CSS	·	430 m	MPC · JPL
627757	2010 UA_{13}	—	October 28, 2010	Catalina	CSS	·	720 m	MPC · JPL
627758	2010 UE_{19}	—	October 28, 2010	Mount Lemmon	Mount Lemmon Survey	·	540 m	MPC · JPL
627759	2010 UD_{22}	—	October 28, 2010	Mount Lemmon	Mount Lemmon Survey	H	390 m	MPC · JPL
627760	2010 UJ_{27}	—	October 28, 2010	Mount Lemmon	Mount Lemmon Survey	·	550 m	MPC · JPL
627761	2010 UA_{40}	—	October 29, 2010	Piszkés-tető	K. Sárneczky, S. Kürti	AGN	970 m	MPC · JPL
627762	2010 UO_{96}	—	October 9, 2010	Mount Lemmon	Mount Lemmon Survey	(1547)	1.8 km	MPC · JPL
627763	2010 UP_{98}	—	October 29, 2010	Mount Lemmon	Mount Lemmon Survey	·	1.2 km	MPC · JPL
627764	2010 UR_{112}	—	October 17, 2010	Mount Lemmon	Mount Lemmon Survey	·	480 m	MPC · JPL
627765	2010 UX_{112}	—	September 2, 2014	Haleakala	Pan-STARRS 1	·	1.4 km	MPC · JPL
627766	2010 UR_{115}	—	October 31, 2010	Mount Lemmon	Mount Lemmon Survey	·	1.2 km	MPC · JPL
627767	2010 UT_{115}	—	October 30, 2010	Mount Lemmon	Mount Lemmon Survey	·	1.6 km	MPC · JPL
627768	2010 UH_{125}	—	October 29, 2010	Catalina	CSS	·	490 m	MPC · JPL
627769	2010 UL_{125}	—	October 19, 2010	Mount Lemmon	Mount Lemmon Survey	·	460 m	MPC · JPL
627770	2010 UQ_{126}	—	October 19, 2010	Mount Lemmon	Mount Lemmon Survey	·	1.3 km	MPC · JPL
627771	2010 VR_{1}	—	November 1, 2010	Mount Lemmon	Mount Lemmon Survey	PHO	740 m	MPC · JPL
627772	2010 VY_{1}	—	September 18, 2010	Mount Lemmon	Mount Lemmon Survey	·	490 m	MPC · JPL
627773	2010 VD_{28}	—	October 15, 2001	Apache Point	SDSS Collaboration	·	1.4 km	MPC · JPL
627774	2010 VO_{45}	—	October 22, 2006	Mount Lemmon	Mount Lemmon Survey	·	1.2 km	MPC · JPL
627775	2010 VA_{69}	—	October 16, 2001	Kitt Peak	Spacewatch	·	1.6 km	MPC · JPL
627776	2010 VF_{107}	—	November 6, 2010	Kitt Peak	Spacewatch	·	1.3 km	MPC · JPL
627777	2010 VW_{115}	—	October 30, 2010	Mount Lemmon	Mount Lemmon Survey	·	1.2 km	MPC · JPL
627778	2010 VV_{120}	—	November 8, 2010	Kitt Peak	Spacewatch	·	410 m	MPC · JPL
627779	2010 VF_{141}	—	November 6, 2010	Mount Lemmon	Mount Lemmon Survey	·	1.3 km	MPC · JPL
627780	2010 VR_{141}	—	November 6, 2010	Mount Lemmon	Mount Lemmon Survey	AGN	840 m	MPC · JPL
627781	2010 VE_{145}	—	November 6, 2010	Mount Lemmon	Mount Lemmon Survey	·	550 m	MPC · JPL
627782	2010 VU_{191}	—	October 1, 2010	Mount Lemmon	Mount Lemmon Survey	·	1.2 km	MPC · JPL
627783	2010 VO_{196}	—	November 5, 2010	Mount Lemmon	Mount Lemmon Survey	AEO	800 m	MPC · JPL
627784	2010 VK_{213}	—	October 14, 2010	Mount Lemmon	Mount Lemmon Survey	·	930 m	MPC · JPL
627785	2010 VN_{216}	—	November 10, 2010	Mount Lemmon	Mount Lemmon Survey	·	1.2 km	MPC · JPL
627786	2010 VY_{226}	—	November 2, 2010	Mount Lemmon	Mount Lemmon Survey	·	1.3 km	MPC · JPL
627787	2010 VA_{227}	—	November 3, 2010	Mount Lemmon	Mount Lemmon Survey	·	1.4 km	MPC · JPL
627788	2010 VH_{227}	—	November 6, 2010	Mount Lemmon	Mount Lemmon Survey	·	1.2 km	MPC · JPL
627789	2010 VE_{231}	—	August 27, 2014	Haleakala	Pan-STARRS 1	·	1.5 km	MPC · JPL
627790	2010 VZ_{238}	—	August 28, 2014	Haleakala	Pan-STARRS 1	PAD	1.1 km	MPC · JPL
627791	2010 VU_{240}	—	November 12, 2010	Mount Lemmon	Mount Lemmon Survey	·	1.2 km	MPC · JPL
627792	2010 VK_{260}	—	November 13, 2010	Mount Lemmon	Mount Lemmon Survey	·	460 m	MPC · JPL
627793	2010 VE_{262}	—	November 2, 2010	Mount Lemmon	Mount Lemmon Survey	·	510 m	MPC · JPL
627794	2010 WO_{25}	—	August 30, 2005	Kitt Peak	Spacewatch	·	1.4 km	MPC · JPL
627795	2010 WF_{36}	—	September 13, 2005	Kitt Peak	Spacewatch	·	1.1 km	MPC · JPL
627796	2010 WT_{53}	—	August 22, 2003	Palomar	NEAT	·	510 m	MPC · JPL
627797	2010 WB_{63}	—	November 27, 2010	Mount Lemmon	Mount Lemmon Survey	·	510 m	MPC · JPL
627798	2010 WC_{75}	—	November 25, 2010	Mount Lemmon	Mount Lemmon Survey	·	550 m	MPC · JPL
627799	2010 WA_{77}	—	November 28, 2010	Mount Lemmon	Mount Lemmon Survey	EUN	910 m	MPC · JPL
627800	2010 XS_{12}	—	November 14, 2010	Mount Lemmon	Mount Lemmon Survey	H	490 m	MPC · JPL

== 627801–627900 ==
back to top

Designation			Discovery			Properties		Ref
Permanent	Provisional	Named after	Date	Site	Discoverer(s)	Category	Diam.	Ref
627801	2010 XQ_{29}	—	September 25, 2005	Kitt Peak	Spacewatch	PAD	1.3 km	MPC · JPL
627802	2011 AN_{28}	—	October 26, 2005	Anderson Mesa	LONEOS	·	1.2 km	MPC · JPL
627803	2011 AO_{30}	—	November 15, 2010	Mount Lemmon	Mount Lemmon Survey	DOR	2.2 km	MPC · JPL
627804	2011 AD_{86}	—	January 3, 2011	Catalina	CSS	·	1.6 km	MPC · JPL
627805	2011 AG_{97}	—	January 3, 2011	Mount Lemmon	Mount Lemmon Survey	·	1.1 km	MPC · JPL
627806	2011 BD_{45}	—	February 7, 2002	Kitt Peak	Spacewatch	·	1.4 km	MPC · JPL
627807	2011 BG_{81}	—	January 28, 2011	Mount Lemmon	Mount Lemmon Survey	·	650 m	MPC · JPL
627808	2011 BD_{106}	—	January 28, 2011	Mount Lemmon	Mount Lemmon Survey	V	470 m	MPC · JPL
627809	2011 BY_{123}	—	September 12, 2009	Kitt Peak	Spacewatch	·	1.6 km	MPC · JPL
627810	2011 BS_{131}	—	January 28, 2011	Mount Lemmon	Mount Lemmon Survey	·	460 m	MPC · JPL
627811	2011 BG_{155}	—	January 28, 2011	Kitt Peak	Spacewatch	·	1.8 km	MPC · JPL
627812	2011 BQ_{189}	—	September 12, 2016	Haleakala	Pan-STARRS 1	·	760 m	MPC · JPL
627813	2011 BD_{194}	—	January 27, 2011	Mount Lemmon	Mount Lemmon Survey	·	1.4 km	MPC · JPL
627814	2011 BV_{196}	—	January 27, 2011	Mount Lemmon	Mount Lemmon Survey	·	540 m	MPC · JPL
627815	2011 CS_{94}	—	February 10, 2011	Mount Lemmon	Mount Lemmon Survey	·	1.5 km	MPC · JPL
627816	2011 CT_{106}	—	February 25, 2011	Mount Lemmon	Mount Lemmon Survey	·	460 m	MPC · JPL
627817	2011 CV_{109}	—	February 5, 2011	Haleakala	Pan-STARRS 1	·	1.4 km	MPC · JPL
627818	2011 CP_{121}	—	October 19, 2006	Catalina	CSS	PHO	770 m	MPC · JPL
627819	2011 ER_{11}	—	December 29, 1999	Mauna Kea	Veillet, C.	·	940 m	MPC · JPL
627820	2011 EG_{65}	—	October 2, 2006	Catalina	CSS	PHO	760 m	MPC · JPL
627821	2011 EM_{67}	—	March 10, 2011	Kitt Peak	Spacewatch	·	670 m	MPC · JPL
627822	2011 ET_{103}	—	March 1, 2011	Mount Lemmon	Mount Lemmon Survey	·	560 m	MPC · JPL
627823	2011 FL_{37}	—	March 25, 2011	Catalina	CSS	·	1.1 km	MPC · JPL
627824	2011 FR_{42}	—	February 10, 2007	Mount Lemmon	Mount Lemmon Survey	·	1.0 km	MPC · JPL
627825	2011 FL_{53}	—	March 29, 2011	Mount Lemmon	Mount Lemmon Survey	V	730 m	MPC · JPL
627826	2011 FO_{60}	—	July 29, 2008	Kitt Peak	Spacewatch	·	780 m	MPC · JPL
627827	2011 FD_{117}	—	October 23, 2009	Mount Lemmon	Mount Lemmon Survey	V	580 m	MPC · JPL
627828	2011 FN_{144}	—	February 23, 2011	Kitt Peak	Spacewatch	·	930 m	MPC · JPL
627829	2011 GH_{85}	—	October 8, 2008	Kitt Peak	Spacewatch	·	1.1 km	MPC · JPL
627830	2011 HT_{19}	—	January 28, 2007	Kitt Peak	Spacewatch	·	850 m	MPC · JPL
627831	2011 KG_{37}	—	May 21, 2011	Haleakala	Pan-STARRS 1	·	1.2 km	MPC · JPL
627832	2011 KH_{41}	—	August 20, 2001	Cerro Tololo	Deep Ecliptic Survey	·	2.3 km	MPC · JPL
627833	2011 QK_{82}	—	February 1, 2009	Kitt Peak	Spacewatch	·	820 m	MPC · JPL
627834	2011 QJ_{83}	—	August 24, 2011	Haleakala	Pan-STARRS 1	·	440 m	MPC · JPL
627835	2011 QP_{99}	—	September 30, 2013	Mount Lemmon	Mount Lemmon Survey	L5	9.4 km	MPC · JPL
627836	2011 RG_{24}	—	September 4, 2011	Haleakala	Pan-STARRS 1	·	470 m	MPC · JPL
627837	2011 SA_{7}	—	September 14, 2007	Mount Lemmon	Mount Lemmon Survey	·	430 m	MPC · JPL
627838	2011 SH_{50}	—	May 1, 2006	Mauna Kea	P. A. Wiegert	(5)	620 m	MPC · JPL
627839	2011 SB_{90}	—	July 5, 2011	Haleakala	Pan-STARRS 1	·	1.0 km	MPC · JPL
627840	2011 SW_{105}	—	February 1, 2009	Mount Lemmon	Mount Lemmon Survey	T_{j} (2.95)	3.9 km	MPC · JPL
627841	2011 SJ_{146}	—	September 26, 2011	Kitt Peak	Spacewatch	·	1.4 km	MPC · JPL
627842	2011 SW_{158}	—	November 20, 2003	Kitt Peak	Deep Ecliptic Survey	(5)	1.1 km	MPC · JPL
627843	2011 SG_{179}	—	October 21, 2007	Mount Lemmon	Mount Lemmon Survey	·	740 m	MPC · JPL
627844	2011 SC_{186}	—	October 11, 2007	Kitt Peak	Spacewatch	·	570 m	MPC · JPL
627845	2011 SQ_{215}	—	August 28, 2011	Haleakala	Pan-STARRS 1	·	680 m	MPC · JPL
627846	2011 SJ_{217}	—	September 26, 2003	Apache Point	SDSS	·	680 m	MPC · JPL
627847	2011 SR_{221}	—	October 15, 2007	Mount Lemmon	Mount Lemmon Survey	(5)	890 m	MPC · JPL
627848	2011 SR_{227}	—	September 29, 2011	Mount Lemmon	Mount Lemmon Survey	MAR	690 m	MPC · JPL
627849	2011 SO_{291}	—	September 23, 2011	Haleakala	Pan-STARRS 1	·	500 m	MPC · JPL
627850	2011 UA_{20}	—	October 19, 2011	Kitt Peak	Spacewatch	EUN	750 m	MPC · JPL
627851	2011 US_{20}	—	October 25, 2003	Kitt Peak	Spacewatch	·	550 m	MPC · JPL
627852	2011 UX_{22}	—	September 22, 2011	Kitt Peak	Spacewatch	·	490 m	MPC · JPL
627853	2011 UR_{40}	—	October 12, 2007	Kitt Peak	Spacewatch	·	490 m	MPC · JPL
627854	2011 UX_{44}	—	October 19, 2007	Kitt Peak	Spacewatch	·	620 m	MPC · JPL
627855	2011 UA_{67}	—	October 25, 2007	Mount Lemmon	Mount Lemmon Survey	·	990 m	MPC · JPL
627856	2011 UY_{72}	—	October 18, 2011	Mount Lemmon	Mount Lemmon Survey	·	1.4 km	MPC · JPL
627857	2011 UN_{73}	—	October 18, 2011	Mount Lemmon	Mount Lemmon Survey	MAR	790 m	MPC · JPL
627858	2011 UZ_{80}	—	November 7, 2007	Kitt Peak	Spacewatch	·	360 m	MPC · JPL
627859	2011 UB_{81}	—	November 14, 2007	Kitt Peak	Spacewatch	·	960 m	MPC · JPL
627860	2011 UR_{116}	—	November 20, 2007	Kitt Peak	Spacewatch	·	850 m	MPC · JPL
627861	2011 UK_{139}	—	October 11, 2002	Apache Point	SDSS	·	1.0 km	MPC · JPL
627862	2011 UF_{149}	—	October 22, 2011	Kitt Peak	Spacewatch	·	850 m	MPC · JPL
627863	2011 US_{171}	—	October 9, 2007	Kitt Peak	Spacewatch	·	1.1 km	MPC · JPL
627864	2011 UD_{238}	—	March 16, 2005	Mount Lemmon	Mount Lemmon Survey	·	1.2 km	MPC · JPL
627865	2011 UE_{246}	—	November 9, 2007	Kitt Peak	Spacewatch	·	970 m	MPC · JPL
627866	2011 UL_{249}	—	January 16, 2004	Kitt Peak	Spacewatch	(5)	960 m	MPC · JPL
627867	2011 UC_{282}	—	November 19, 2007	Mount Lemmon	Mount Lemmon Survey	(5)	740 m	MPC · JPL
627868	2011 UO_{311}	—	October 22, 2011	Kitt Peak	Spacewatch	·	920 m	MPC · JPL
627869	2011 UY_{327}	—	October 22, 2011	Kitt Peak	Spacewatch	(5)	740 m	MPC · JPL
627870	2011 UG_{353}	—	September 15, 2007	Mount Lemmon	Mount Lemmon Survey	·	1.1 km	MPC · JPL
627871	2011 UP_{374}	—	October 1, 2011	Piszkéstető	K. Sárneczky	·	670 m	MPC · JPL
627872	2011 UF_{388}	—	October 25, 2011	Haleakala	Pan-STARRS 1	·	670 m	MPC · JPL
627873	2011 UG_{415}	—	October 29, 1999	Kitt Peak	Spacewatch	·	850 m	MPC · JPL
627874	2011 UV_{431}	—	October 15, 2007	Mount Lemmon	Mount Lemmon Survey	·	460 m	MPC · JPL
627875	2011 VM_{13}	—	September 12, 2002	Palomar	NEAT	·	1.1 km	MPC · JPL
627876	2011 WW_{8}	—	November 3, 2011	Kitt Peak	Spacewatch	·	970 m	MPC · JPL
627877	2011 WX_{14}	—	October 26, 2011	Haleakala	Pan-STARRS 1	BRG	1.3 km	MPC · JPL
627878	2011 WG_{35}	—	December 5, 2007	Mount Lemmon	Mount Lemmon Survey	·	970 m	MPC · JPL
627879	2011 WM_{35}	—	November 5, 2007	Mount Lemmon	Mount Lemmon Survey	·	850 m	MPC · JPL
627880	2011 WY_{38}	—	December 18, 2007	Kitt Peak	Spacewatch	·	670 m	MPC · JPL
627881	2011 WK_{43}	—	December 4, 2007	Mount Lemmon	Mount Lemmon Survey	·	870 m	MPC · JPL
627882	2011 WW_{93}	—	November 27, 2011	Mount Lemmon	Mount Lemmon Survey	·	1.1 km	MPC · JPL
627883	2011 WY_{128}	—	December 4, 2007	Mount Lemmon	Mount Lemmon Survey	EUN	840 m	MPC · JPL
627884	2011 WT_{146}	—	November 12, 2007	Mount Lemmon	Mount Lemmon Survey	·	1.1 km	MPC · JPL
627885	2011 WD_{163}	—	November 25, 2011	Haleakala	Pan-STARRS 1	·	930 m	MPC · JPL
627886	2011 XR	—	October 26, 2011	Haleakala	Pan-STARRS 1	(5)	740 m	MPC · JPL
627887	2011 YV_{4}	—	March 1, 2008	Mount Lemmon	Mount Lemmon Survey	·	790 m	MPC · JPL
627888	2011 YY_{6}	—	February 1, 2003	Needville	Cruz, A., J. Dellinger	·	1.6 km	MPC · JPL
627889	2011 YQ_{22}	—	December 25, 2011	Kitt Peak	Spacewatch	·	1.6 km	MPC · JPL
627890	2011 YX_{32}	—	October 22, 2011	Mount Lemmon	Mount Lemmon Survey	·	1.7 km	MPC · JPL
627891	2011 YN_{77}	—	September 11, 2002	Palomar	NEAT	·	980 m	MPC · JPL
627892	2011 YT_{84}	—	December 26, 2011	Mount Lemmon	Mount Lemmon Survey	·	780 m	MPC · JPL
627893	2012 AT_{2}	—	January 2, 2012	Kitt Peak	Spacewatch	·	1.0 km	MPC · JPL
627894	2012 AZ_{12}	—	January 14, 2012	Haleakala	Pan-STARRS 1	H	410 m	MPC · JPL
627895	2012 AX_{16}	—	November 9, 2007	Mount Lemmon	Mount Lemmon Survey	·	730 m	MPC · JPL
627896	2012 AZ_{28}	—	December 6, 2015	Mount Lemmon	Mount Lemmon Survey	·	1.2 km	MPC · JPL
627897	2012 BP_{36}	—	January 19, 2012	Mount Lemmon	Mount Lemmon Survey	3:2 · SHU	4.5 km	MPC · JPL
627898	2012 BY_{65}	—	January 20, 2012	Mount Lemmon	Mount Lemmon Survey	·	1.5 km	MPC · JPL
627899	2012 BT_{66}	—	March 28, 2008	Mount Lemmon	Mount Lemmon Survey	·	1.4 km	MPC · JPL
627900	2012 BA_{70}	—	January 21, 2012	Kitt Peak	Spacewatch	·	770 m	MPC · JPL

== 627901–628000 ==
back to top

Designation			Discovery			Properties		Ref
Permanent	Provisional	Named after	Date	Site	Discoverer(s)	Category	Diam.	Ref
627901	2012 BK_{78}	—	January 21, 2012	Mount Lemmon	Mount Lemmon Survey	·	1.2 km	MPC · JPL
627902	2012 BN_{95}	—	January 14, 2012	Kitt Peak	Spacewatch	·	1.1 km	MPC · JPL
627903	2012 BV_{113}	—	December 28, 2002	Kitt Peak	Spacewatch	·	1.6 km	MPC · JPL
627904	2012 BK_{124}	—	January 26, 2012	Haleakala	Pan-STARRS 1	EUN	720 m	MPC · JPL
627905	2012 BX_{140}	—	October 16, 1998	Kitt Peak	Spacewatch	·	870 m	MPC · JPL
627906	2012 BP_{150}	—	January 30, 2012	Bisei	BATTeRS	DOR	1.9 km	MPC · JPL
627907	2012 BT_{159}	—	December 27, 2006	Mount Lemmon	Mount Lemmon Survey	DOR	2.1 km	MPC · JPL
627908	2012 BG_{163}	—	January 26, 2012	Mount Lemmon	Mount Lemmon Survey	·	590 m	MPC · JPL
627909	2012 CT_{23}	—	January 1, 2012	Mount Lemmon	Mount Lemmon Survey	·	1.4 km	MPC · JPL
627910	2012 CY_{28}	—	January 19, 2012	Haleakala	Pan-STARRS 1	DOR	2.3 km	MPC · JPL
627911	2012 CW_{47}	—	January 27, 2012	Mount Lemmon	Mount Lemmon Survey	·	1.4 km	MPC · JPL
627912	2012 CZ_{58}	—	February 3, 2012	Haleakala	Pan-STARRS 1	·	2.4 km	MPC · JPL
627913	2012 DD_{2}	—	February 16, 2012	Haleakala	Pan-STARRS 1	·	1.5 km	MPC · JPL
627914	2012 DM_{3}	—	August 26, 2000	Cerro Tololo	Deep Ecliptic Survey	·	1.9 km	MPC · JPL
627915	2012 DS_{71}	—	December 15, 2006	Kitt Peak	Spacewatch	·	2.1 km	MPC · JPL
627916	2012 DA_{74}	—	April 10, 2003	Kitt Peak	Spacewatch	DOR	2.4 km	MPC · JPL
627917	2012 HH_{69}	—	April 15, 2012	Haleakala	Pan-STARRS 1	·	510 m	MPC · JPL
627918	2012 JB_{52}	—	December 30, 2007	Kitt Peak	Spacewatch	·	700 m	MPC · JPL
627919	2012 JM_{63}	—	April 16, 2007	Mount Lemmon	Mount Lemmon Survey	KOR	1.2 km	MPC · JPL
627920	2012 KG_{12}	—	April 27, 2012	Haleakala	Pan-STARRS 1	H	380 m	MPC · JPL
627921	2012 MM_{14}	—	April 21, 2006	Kitt Peak	Spacewatch	·	2.2 km	MPC · JPL
627922	2012 MR_{16}	—	June 22, 2012	ESA OGS	ESA OGS	·	2.6 km	MPC · JPL
627923	2012 PO_{1}	—	August 8, 2012	Haleakala	Pan-STARRS 1	V	380 m	MPC · JPL
627924	2012 QC_{9}	—	December 22, 2008	Mount Lemmon	Mount Lemmon Survey	·	1.7 km	MPC · JPL
627925	2012 QE_{54}	—	August 26, 2012	Kitt Peak	Spacewatch	·	770 m	MPC · JPL
627926	2012 RH_{2}	—	January 11, 2010	Kitt Peak	Spacewatch	·	870 m	MPC · JPL
627927	2012 RC_{31}	—	November 21, 2001	Socorro	LINEAR	MAS	660 m	MPC · JPL
627928	2012 RT_{35}	—	October 26, 2001	Palomar	NEAT	·	960 m	MPC · JPL
627929	2012 RO_{44}	—	September 11, 2012	Siding Spring	SSS	·	1.2 km	MPC · JPL
627930	2012 RH_{47}	—	June 25, 2017	Haleakala	Pan-STARRS 1	·	2.5 km	MPC · JPL
627931	2012 SX_{8}	—	February 26, 2004	Kitt Peak	Deep Ecliptic Survey	·	2.8 km	MPC · JPL
627932	2012 SB_{31}	—	September 16, 2012	Mount Lemmon	Mount Lemmon Survey	HYG	2.6 km	MPC · JPL
627933	2012 SK_{44}	—	February 22, 2003	Palomar	NEAT	V	870 m	MPC · JPL
627934	2012 SM_{69}	—	September 21, 2012	Kitt Peak	Spacewatch	·	990 m	MPC · JPL
627935	2012 TF_{14}	—	March 13, 2007	Kitt Peak	Spacewatch	L5	9.1 km	MPC · JPL
627936	2012 TM_{22}	—	September 15, 2012	Mount Lemmon	Mount Lemmon Survey	·	930 m	MPC · JPL
627937	2012 TR_{51}	—	February 1, 2003	Palomar	NEAT	·	3.5 km	MPC · JPL
627938	2012 TA_{69}	—	January 10, 2006	Kitt Peak	Spacewatch	MAS	660 m	MPC · JPL
627939 Phyllisthornton	2012 TG_{71}	Phyllisthornton	October 9, 2012	Mayhill	Falla, N.	·	850 m	MPC · JPL
627940	2012 TH_{72}	—	November 21, 2009	Mount Lemmon	Mount Lemmon Survey	·	1.2 km	MPC · JPL
627941	2012 TE_{76}	—	January 22, 2002	Kitt Peak	Spacewatch	·	810 m	MPC · JPL
627942	2012 TY_{116}	—	November 2, 2008	Kitt Peak	Spacewatch	(5)	970 m	MPC · JPL
627943	2012 TY_{133}	—	November 12, 2001	Apache Point	SDSS Collaboration	·	2.7 km	MPC · JPL
627944	2012 TQ_{138}	—	September 16, 2012	Kitt Peak	Spacewatch	NYS	770 m	MPC · JPL
627945	2012 TE_{144}	—	October 9, 2012	Mount Lemmon	Mount Lemmon Survey	L5	8.5 km	MPC · JPL
627946	2012 TZ_{144}	—	October 16, 2001	Kitt Peak	Spacewatch	MAS	580 m	MPC · JPL
627947	2012 TQ_{203}	—	March 20, 2007	Mount Lemmon	Mount Lemmon Survey	L5	8.4 km	MPC · JPL
627948	2012 TW_{205}	—	September 17, 2012	Kitt Peak	Spacewatch	·	2.1 km	MPC · JPL
627949	2012 TP_{254}	—	October 11, 2012	Piszkéstető	K. Sárneczky	·	2.8 km	MPC · JPL
627950	2012 TS_{270}	—	October 11, 2012	Haleakala	Pan-STARRS 1	·	2.5 km	MPC · JPL
627951	2012 TB_{304}	—	December 25, 2005	Kitt Peak	Spacewatch	NYS	1.0 km	MPC · JPL
627952	2012 TW_{311}	—	May 12, 2011	Mount Lemmon	Mount Lemmon Survey	·	1.3 km	MPC · JPL
627953	2012 TE_{321}	—	October 15, 2012	Catalina	CSS	·	2.7 km	MPC · JPL
627954	2012 TH_{332}	—	October 10, 2012	Mount Lemmon	Mount Lemmon Survey	·	2.3 km	MPC · JPL
627955	2012 TX_{349}	—	October 7, 2012	Haleakala	Pan-STARRS 1	·	720 m	MPC · JPL
627956	2012 TO_{370}	—	October 4, 2012	Mount Lemmon	Mount Lemmon Survey	VER	2.0 km	MPC · JPL
627957	2012 TQ_{379}	—	October 8, 2012	Mount Lemmon	Mount Lemmon Survey	·	2.6 km	MPC · JPL
627958	2012 UT_{29}	—	February 23, 2003	Campo Imperatore	CINEOS	·	3.3 km	MPC · JPL
627959	2012 UV_{56}	—	October 24, 1995	Kitt Peak	Spacewatch	·	2.9 km	MPC · JPL
627960	2012 UA_{103}	—	December 1, 2005	Kitt Peak	Wasserman, L. H., Millis, R. L.	·	1.5 km	MPC · JPL
627961	2012 UB_{105}	—	October 6, 2008	Mount Lemmon	Mount Lemmon Survey	·	1.4 km	MPC · JPL
627962	2012 UD_{117}	—	October 22, 2012	Mount Lemmon	Mount Lemmon Survey	EUP	2.6 km	MPC · JPL
627963	2012 UX_{147}	—	September 7, 2008	Mount Lemmon	Mount Lemmon Survey	·	890 m	MPC · JPL
627964	2012 UW_{159}	—	October 6, 2012	Haleakala	Pan-STARRS 1	·	2.9 km	MPC · JPL
627965	2012 UW_{163}	—	September 7, 2008	Mount Lemmon	Mount Lemmon Survey	NYS	990 m	MPC · JPL
627966	2012 UC_{228}	—	October 20, 2012	Haleakala	Pan-STARRS 1	·	2.4 km	MPC · JPL
627967	2012 VW_{32}	—	June 6, 2011	Haleakala	Pan-STARRS 1	H	500 m	MPC · JPL
627968	2012 VS_{53}	—	November 6, 2012	Mount Lemmon	Mount Lemmon Survey	NYS	1.2 km	MPC · JPL
627969	2012 VN_{55}	—	May 6, 2003	Kitt Peak	Spacewatch	·	1.2 km	MPC · JPL
627970	2012 VT_{55}	—	October 21, 2012	Haleakala	Pan-STARRS 1	T_{j} (2.99)	2.9 km	MPC · JPL
627971	2012 VR_{97}	—	January 31, 2006	Kitt Peak	Spacewatch	NYS	1.1 km	MPC · JPL
627972	2012 VW_{110}	—	October 17, 2012	Mount Lemmon	Mount Lemmon Survey	·	1.1 km	MPC · JPL
627973	2012 VC_{117}	—	November 4, 2012	Kitt Peak	Spacewatch	·	830 m	MPC · JPL
627974	2012 XF_{40}	—	December 3, 2012	Catalina	CSS	·	2.4 km	MPC · JPL
627975	2012 XN_{40}	—	October 21, 2008	Kitt Peak	Spacewatch	·	1.3 km	MPC · JPL
627976	2012 XU_{52}	—	December 6, 2012	Kitt Peak	Spacewatch	·	1.3 km	MPC · JPL
627977	2012 XW_{83}	—	August 23, 2011	Mayhill-ISON	L. Elenin	·	1.4 km	MPC · JPL
627978	2012 XK_{121}	—	October 26, 2008	Mount Lemmon	Mount Lemmon Survey	·	1.3 km	MPC · JPL
627979	2013 AF_{51}	—	January 29, 2009	Mount Lemmon	Mount Lemmon Survey	·	960 m	MPC · JPL
627980	2013 AH_{54}	—	December 11, 2012	Mount Lemmon	Mount Lemmon Survey	·	960 m	MPC · JPL
627981 Ponzoni	2013 AW_{79}	Ponzoni	December 8, 2012	Mount Graham	K. Černis, R. P. Boyl	·	980 m	MPC · JPL
627982	2013 AB_{101}	—	January 10, 2013	Mount Lemmon	Mount Lemmon Survey	·	1.2 km	MPC · JPL
627983	2013 AJ_{117}	—	March 3, 2005	Kitt Peak	Spacewatch	·	1.1 km	MPC · JPL
627984	2013 BB_{10}	—	October 8, 2004	Kitt Peak	Spacewatch	·	770 m	MPC · JPL
627985	2013 BA_{72}	—	October 19, 2003	Kitt Peak	Spacewatch	·	1.2 km	MPC · JPL
627986	2013 BX_{84}	—	January 20, 2013	Kitt Peak	Spacewatch	·	840 m	MPC · JPL
627987	2013 CD_{11}	—	February 1, 2013	Kitt Peak	Spacewatch	·	720 m	MPC · JPL
627988	2013 CB_{23}	—	May 4, 2005	Catalina	CSS	·	1.5 km	MPC · JPL
627989	2013 CM_{39}	—	September 10, 2007	Kitt Peak	Spacewatch	·	750 m	MPC · JPL
627990	2013 CE_{69}	—	September 20, 2011	Haleakala	Pan-STARRS 1	·	910 m	MPC · JPL
627991	2013 CS_{94}	—	February 8, 2013	Haleakala	Pan-STARRS 1	·	1.1 km	MPC · JPL
627992	2013 CT_{103}	—	January 19, 2013	Kitt Peak	Spacewatch	·	1.0 km	MPC · JPL
627993	2013 CO_{148}	—	November 3, 2007	Mount Lemmon	Mount Lemmon Survey	·	1.1 km	MPC · JPL
627994	2013 CU_{185}	—	October 21, 2003	Kitt Peak	Spacewatch	·	940 m	MPC · JPL
627995	2013 CE_{196}	—	February 20, 2009	Kitt Peak	Spacewatch	·	1 km	MPC · JPL
627996	2013 CH_{201}	—	February 1, 2009	Kitt Peak	Spacewatch	·	960 m	MPC · JPL
627997	2013 CK_{225}	—	February 15, 2013	Haleakala	Pan-STARRS 1	·	1.1 km	MPC · JPL
627998	2013 CQ_{225}	—	August 10, 2011	Haleakala	Pan-STARRS 1	(5)	880 m	MPC · JPL
627999	2013 CC_{229}	—	February 13, 2013	ESA OGS	ESA OGS	·	930 m	MPC · JPL
628000	2013 DN_{6}	—	October 10, 2007	Kitt Peak	Spacewatch	·	990 m	MPC · JPL

back to top

== Meaning of names ==
As minor planet discoveries are confirmed, they are given a permanent number by the IAU's Minor Planet Center (MPC), and the discoverers can then submit names for them, following the IAU's naming conventions. The list below concerns those minor planets in the specified number-range that have received names, and explains the meanings of those names.

Official naming citations of newly named small Solar System bodies are approved and published in a bulletin by IAU's Working Group for Small Bodies Nomenclature (WGSBN). Before May 2021, citations were published in MPC's Minor Planet Circulars for many decades. Recent citations can also be found on the JPL Small-Body Database (SBDB). Until his death in 2016, German astronomer Lutz D. Schmadel compiled these citations into the Dictionary of Minor Planet Names (DMP) and regularly updated the collection.

Based on Paul Herget's The Names of the Minor Planets, Schmadel also researched the unclear origin of numerous asteroids, most of which had been named prior to World War II. This article incorporates text from this source, which is in the public domain: SBDB New namings may only be added to this list below after official publication as the preannouncement of names is condemned. The WGSBN publishes a comprehensive guideline for the naming rules of non-cometary small Solar System bodies.

Named minor planet	Provisional	This minor planet was named for...	Ref · Catalog
627030 Ciobanu	2008 EL_{144}	Monica Zoe Ciobanu (b. 1934) is a retired astronomer who worked in the Time service of the Romanian Astronomical Institute.	IAU · 627030
627435 Mircearusu	2008 UO_{387}	Mircea Rusu, retired Romanian professor in the Faculty of Physics, University of Bucharest.	IAU · 627435
627520 Corbey	2008 WH_{154}	Raymond Corbey (b. 1954), a Dutch emeritus professor in the Philosophy of Science and Anthropology at Leiden University.	IAU · 627520
627939 Phyllisthornton	2012 TG_{71}	Phyllis Thornton (1927–2023), the sister-in-law of the discoverer	IAU · 627939
627981 Ponzoni	2013 AW_{79}	Sister Emilia (Anna) Ponzoni (1883–1950), one of the four nuns who from 1910 to 1921 catalogued 500,000 stars in the Vatican zone of the Carte du Ciel star atlas.	IAU · 627981
