= List of minor planets: 604001–605000 =

The following is a partial list of minor planets, running from minor-planet number 604001 through 605000, inclusive. The primary data for this and other partial lists is based on JPL's "Small-Body Orbital Elements" and data available from the Minor Planet Center. Critical list information is also provided by the MPC, unless otherwise specified from Lowell Observatory. A detailed description of the table's columns and additional sources are given on the main page including a complete list of every page in this series, and a statistical break-up on the dynamical classification of minor planets.

Also see the summary list of all named bodies in numerical and alphabetical order, and the corresponding naming citations for the number range of this particular list. New namings may only be added to this list after official publication, as the preannouncement of names is condemned by the Working Group for Small Bodies Nomenclature of the International Astronomical Union.

Near-Earth obj.	MBA (inner)	MBA (outer)	Centaur
Mars-crosser	MBA (middle)	Jupiter trojan	Trans-Neptunian obj.
Unclassified

== 604001–604100 ==
Designation			Discovery			Properties		Ref
Permanent	Provisional	Named after	Date	Site	Discoverer(s)	Category	Diam.	Ref
604001 Iagiellonica	2015 KC_{7}	Iagiellonica	February 24, 2014	Tincana	M. Kusiak, M. Żołnowski	·	1.7 km	MPC · JPL
604002	2015 KN_{7}	—	May 18, 2015	Mount Lemmon	Mount Lemmon Survey	T_{j} (2.96) · 3:2	4.4 km	MPC · JPL
604003	2015 KT_{8}	—	August 5, 2005	Palomar	NEAT	·	4.4 km	MPC · JPL
604004	2015 KX_{10}	—	March 28, 2015	Haleakala	Pan-STARRS 1	·	1.3 km	MPC · JPL
604005	2015 KZ_{12}	—	March 30, 2015	Haleakala	Pan-STARRS 1	ADE	1.4 km	MPC · JPL
604006	2015 KX_{15}	—	March 8, 2014	Mount Lemmon	Mount Lemmon Survey	·	1.4 km	MPC · JPL
604007	2015 KP_{17}	—	January 24, 2014	Haleakala	Pan-STARRS 1	·	1.3 km	MPC · JPL
604008	2015 KA_{19}	—	October 31, 2008	Catalina	CSS	H	480 m	MPC · JPL
604009	2015 KV_{19}	—	August 3, 2002	Palomar	NEAT	·	2.3 km	MPC · JPL
604010	2015 KR_{26}	—	March 30, 2015	Haleakala	Pan-STARRS 1	·	1.0 km	MPC · JPL
604011	2015 KD_{27}	—	April 24, 2015	Haleakala	Pan-STARRS 1	·	1.3 km	MPC · JPL
604012	2015 KY_{30}	—	November 24, 2012	Kitt Peak	Spacewatch	·	1.6 km	MPC · JPL
604013	2015 KF_{31}	—	November 18, 2007	Mount Lemmon	Mount Lemmon Survey	·	2.5 km	MPC · JPL
604014	2015 KT_{36}	—	May 24, 2006	Mount Lemmon	Mount Lemmon Survey	·	1.1 km	MPC · JPL
604015	2015 KG_{41}	—	June 3, 2011	Mount Lemmon	Mount Lemmon Survey	·	910 m	MPC · JPL
604016	2015 KZ_{41}	—	May 20, 2015	Haleakala	Pan-STARRS 1	·	660 m	MPC · JPL
604017	2015 KR_{43}	—	December 22, 2008	Mount Lemmon	Mount Lemmon Survey	·	1.9 km	MPC · JPL
604018	2015 KR_{44}	—	November 12, 2012	Mount Lemmon	Mount Lemmon Survey	·	1.5 km	MPC · JPL
604019	2015 KR_{45}	—	September 15, 2007	Mount Lemmon	Mount Lemmon Survey	·	2.9 km	MPC · JPL
604020	2015 KO_{46}	—	September 11, 2007	Mount Lemmon	Mount Lemmon Survey	AGN	990 m	MPC · JPL
604021	2015 KJ_{47}	—	September 12, 2007	Mount Lemmon	Mount Lemmon Survey	·	1.0 km	MPC · JPL
604022	2015 KP_{47}	—	October 11, 2007	Catalina	CSS	EUN	1.3 km	MPC · JPL
604023	2015 KW_{47}	—	January 2, 2009	Kitt Peak	Spacewatch	HOF	2.0 km	MPC · JPL
604024	2015 KH_{51}	—	October 30, 2007	Mount Lemmon	Mount Lemmon Survey	·	1.4 km	MPC · JPL
604025	2015 KR_{51}	—	May 20, 2015	Haleakala	Pan-STARRS 1	RAF	840 m	MPC · JPL
604026	2015 KE_{52}	—	May 9, 2002	Socorro	LINEAR	·	1.9 km	MPC · JPL
604027	2015 KB_{53}	—	August 23, 2003	Palomar	NEAT	·	1.1 km	MPC · JPL
604028	2015 KM_{53}	—	May 20, 2015	Haleakala	Pan-STARRS 1	·	1.0 km	MPC · JPL
604029	2015 KO_{53}	—	March 18, 2010	Mount Lemmon	Mount Lemmon Survey	·	1.4 km	MPC · JPL
604030	2015 KA_{55}	—	March 8, 2005	Mount Lemmon	Mount Lemmon Survey	AGN	1.1 km	MPC · JPL
604031	2015 KJ_{56}	—	April 21, 2009	Mount Lemmon	Mount Lemmon Survey	·	2.6 km	MPC · JPL
604032	2015 KL_{56}	—	October 19, 2012	Haleakala	Pan-STARRS 1	·	1.2 km	MPC · JPL
604033	2015 KN_{56}	—	May 20, 2015	Haleakala	Pan-STARRS 1	·	1.8 km	MPC · JPL
604034	2015 KP_{58}	—	October 18, 2012	Haleakala	Pan-STARRS 1	·	2.6 km	MPC · JPL
604035	2015 KR_{58}	—	March 6, 2002	Siding Spring	R. H. McNaught	·	930 m	MPC · JPL
604036	2015 KD_{60}	—	March 19, 2010	Mount Lemmon	Mount Lemmon Survey	HNS	1.3 km	MPC · JPL
604037	2015 KY_{61}	—	October 8, 2012	Mount Lemmon	Mount Lemmon Survey	·	1.0 km	MPC · JPL
604038	2015 KA_{62}	—	May 1, 2011	Haleakala	Pan-STARRS 1	EUN	1.2 km	MPC · JPL
604039	2015 KP_{66}	—	April 25, 2015	Haleakala	Pan-STARRS 1	·	590 m	MPC · JPL
604040	2015 KJ_{67}	—	April 25, 2015	Haleakala	Pan-STARRS 1	·	890 m	MPC · JPL
604041	2015 KW_{70}	—	February 1, 2003	Kitt Peak	Spacewatch	(31811)	3.2 km	MPC · JPL
604042	2015 KY_{70}	—	February 9, 2014	Mount Lemmon	Mount Lemmon Survey	EOS	1.8 km	MPC · JPL
604043	2015 KP_{71}	—	December 31, 2013	Mount Lemmon	Mount Lemmon Survey	·	1.4 km	MPC · JPL
604044	2015 KB_{72}	—	December 3, 2000	Haleakala	NEAT	·	1.5 km	MPC · JPL
604045	2015 KJ_{72}	—	May 15, 2005	Mount Lemmon	Mount Lemmon Survey	EOS	2.1 km	MPC · JPL
604046	2015 KT_{72}	—	November 26, 2012	Mount Lemmon	Mount Lemmon Survey	·	2.5 km	MPC · JPL
604047	2015 KR_{73}	—	April 25, 2015	Haleakala	Pan-STARRS 1	V	570 m	MPC · JPL
604048	2015 KC_{74}	—	May 18, 2015	Mount Lemmon	Mount Lemmon Survey	·	2.4 km	MPC · JPL
604049	2015 KS_{74}	—	February 14, 2010	Kitt Peak	Spacewatch	·	1.4 km	MPC · JPL
604050	2015 KF_{75}	—	March 3, 2009	Kitt Peak	Spacewatch	EOS	1.5 km	MPC · JPL
604051	2015 KB_{77}	—	April 23, 2015	Haleakala	Pan-STARRS 1	·	900 m	MPC · JPL
604052	2015 KZ_{78}	—	December 31, 2007	Mount Lemmon	Mount Lemmon Survey	·	2.5 km	MPC · JPL
604053	2015 KK_{82}	—	May 21, 2015	Haleakala	Pan-STARRS 1	·	2.4 km	MPC · JPL
604054	2015 KT_{82}	—	February 14, 2010	Mount Lemmon	Mount Lemmon Survey	·	1.4 km	MPC · JPL
604055	2015 KD_{85}	—	May 21, 2015	Haleakala	Pan-STARRS 1	·	1.1 km	MPC · JPL
604056	2015 KB_{86}	—	October 17, 2006	Catalina	CSS	·	740 m	MPC · JPL
604057	2015 KR_{87}	—	February 24, 2014	Haleakala	Pan-STARRS 1	EOS	1.6 km	MPC · JPL
604058	2015 KH_{89}	—	March 30, 2015	Haleakala	Pan-STARRS 1	PHO	690 m	MPC · JPL
604059	2015 KU_{89}	—	June 6, 2011	Haleakala	Pan-STARRS 1	·	710 m	MPC · JPL
604060	2015 KP_{90}	—	October 21, 2012	Haleakala	Pan-STARRS 1	·	1.6 km	MPC · JPL
604061	2015 KC_{91}	—	April 23, 2015	Haleakala	Pan-STARRS 1	·	1.1 km	MPC · JPL
604062	2015 KL_{97}	—	February 1, 2009	Catalina	CSS	·	2.5 km	MPC · JPL
604063	2015 KD_{99}	—	November 27, 2013	Haleakala	Pan-STARRS 1	·	950 m	MPC · JPL
604064	2015 KC_{101}	—	March 30, 2015	Haleakala	Pan-STARRS 1	RAF	680 m	MPC · JPL
604065	2015 KB_{102}	—	November 1, 2008	Mount Lemmon	Mount Lemmon Survey	·	1.6 km	MPC · JPL
604066	2015 KH_{102}	—	May 21, 2015	Haleakala	Pan-STARRS 1	·	1.4 km	MPC · JPL
604067	2015 KO_{102}	—	November 7, 2012	Mount Lemmon	Mount Lemmon Survey	·	1.6 km	MPC · JPL
604068	2015 KH_{103}	—	May 8, 2010	Mount Lemmon	Mount Lemmon Survey	·	1.8 km	MPC · JPL
604069	2015 KK_{103}	—	September 26, 2008	Kitt Peak	Spacewatch	·	820 m	MPC · JPL
604070	2015 KG_{104}	—	August 19, 2011	Haleakala	Pan-STARRS 1	·	1.2 km	MPC · JPL
604071	2015 KB_{108}	—	October 6, 2012	Haleakala	Pan-STARRS 1	·	1.2 km	MPC · JPL
604072	2015 KH_{109}	—	November 7, 2008	Mount Lemmon	Mount Lemmon Survey	·	1.3 km	MPC · JPL
604073	2015 KT_{110}	—	November 26, 2012	Mount Lemmon	Mount Lemmon Survey	RAF	1.0 km	MPC · JPL
604074	2015 KO_{119}	—	July 14, 1999	Socorro	LINEAR	·	2.0 km	MPC · JPL
604075	2015 KY_{119}	—	March 28, 2015	Haleakala	Pan-STARRS 1	·	2.0 km	MPC · JPL
604076	2015 KK_{123}	—	February 27, 2015	Haleakala	Pan-STARRS 1	·	1.5 km	MPC · JPL
604077	2015 KO_{123}	—	January 15, 2008	Mount Lemmon	Mount Lemmon Survey	EOS	1.7 km	MPC · JPL
604078	2015 KW_{124}	—	April 25, 2006	Kitt Peak	Spacewatch	·	1.6 km	MPC · JPL
604079	2015 KT_{126}	—	April 11, 2015	Mount Lemmon	Mount Lemmon Survey	·	1.2 km	MPC · JPL
604080	2015 KG_{127}	—	September 7, 2008	Catalina	CSS	·	960 m	MPC · JPL
604081	2015 KQ_{127}	—	December 11, 2013	Haleakala	Pan-STARRS 1	·	2.7 km	MPC · JPL
604082	2015 KT_{127}	—	March 22, 2015	Mount Lemmon	Mount Lemmon Survey	BAP	640 m	MPC · JPL
604083	2015 KK_{130}	—	April 18, 1998	Kitt Peak	Spacewatch	·	3.2 km	MPC · JPL
604084	2015 KU_{131}	—	May 22, 2015	Haleakala	Pan-STARRS 1	·	1.7 km	MPC · JPL
604085	2015 KM_{134}	—	October 7, 2012	Haleakala	Pan-STARRS 1	·	940 m	MPC · JPL
604086	2015 KQ_{134}	—	April 20, 2015	Haleakala	Pan-STARRS 1	·	1.6 km	MPC · JPL
604087	2015 KM_{138}	—	May 12, 2015	Mount Lemmon	Mount Lemmon Survey	·	1.4 km	MPC · JPL
604088	2015 KZ_{139}	—	May 24, 2015	Haleakala	Pan-STARRS 1	RAF	710 m	MPC · JPL
604089	2015 KR_{140}	—	May 18, 2015	Haleakala	Pan-STARRS 2	·	1.0 km	MPC · JPL
604090	2015 KX_{141}	—	October 22, 2003	Kitt Peak	Spacewatch	·	2.0 km	MPC · JPL
604091	2015 KK_{142}	—	November 30, 2006	Kitt Peak	Spacewatch	·	3.4 km	MPC · JPL
604092	2015 KY_{143}	—	November 22, 2012	Kitt Peak	Spacewatch	AST	1.4 km	MPC · JPL
604093	2015 KF_{145}	—	April 21, 2007	Cerro Tololo	Deep Ecliptic Survey	·	1.3 km	MPC · JPL
604094	2015 KH_{146}	—	April 25, 2015	Haleakala	Pan-STARRS 1	·	1.7 km	MPC · JPL
604095	2015 KL_{146}	—	January 21, 2014	Catalina	CSS	HNS	1.4 km	MPC · JPL
604096	2015 KA_{147}	—	April 25, 2015	Haleakala	Pan-STARRS 1	·	1.2 km	MPC · JPL
604097	2015 KB_{147}	—	October 8, 2008	Kitt Peak	Spacewatch	·	1.1 km	MPC · JPL
604098	2015 KC_{147}	—	April 18, 2015	Haleakala	Pan-STARRS 1	·	1.1 km	MPC · JPL
604099	2015 KK_{147}	—	December 13, 2012	Mount Lemmon	Mount Lemmon Survey	·	1.5 km	MPC · JPL
604100	2015 KW_{148}	—	May 24, 2015	Haleakala	Pan-STARRS 1	·	1.6 km	MPC · JPL

== 604101–604200 ==
back to top

Designation			Discovery			Properties		Ref
Permanent	Provisional	Named after	Date	Site	Discoverer(s)	Category	Diam.	Ref
604101	2015 KA_{149}	—	September 23, 2011	Kitt Peak	Spacewatch	·	1.7 km	MPC · JPL
604102	2015 KV_{150}	—	May 10, 2015	Mount Lemmon	Mount Lemmon Survey	·	790 m	MPC · JPL
604103	2015 KD_{152}	—	June 12, 2011	Mount Lemmon	Mount Lemmon Survey	·	2.2 km	MPC · JPL
604104	2015 KL_{152}	—	October 10, 2012	Haleakala	Pan-STARRS 1	·	1.8 km	MPC · JPL
604105	2015 KR_{153}	—	September 23, 2008	Kitt Peak	Spacewatch	·	1.5 km	MPC · JPL
604106	2015 KV_{156}	—	May 22, 2006	Kitt Peak	Spacewatch	MRX	990 m	MPC · JPL
604107	2015 KT_{160}	—	May 24, 2015	Haleakala	Pan-STARRS 1	·	1.3 km	MPC · JPL
604108	2015 KX_{160}	—	March 14, 2005	Mount Lemmon	Mount Lemmon Survey	·	1.6 km	MPC · JPL
604109	2015 KU_{164}	—	May 21, 2015	Cerro Paranal	Altmann, M., Prusti, T.	·	1.3 km	MPC · JPL
604110	2015 KY_{166}	—	October 10, 2007	Mount Lemmon	Mount Lemmon Survey	·	1.5 km	MPC · JPL
604111	2015 KW_{167}	—	March 19, 2009	Kitt Peak	Spacewatch	·	1.7 km	MPC · JPL
604112	2015 KF_{169}	—	November 28, 2013	Mount Lemmon	Mount Lemmon Survey	ADE	1.5 km	MPC · JPL
604113	2015 KB_{170}	—	May 21, 2015	Haleakala	Pan-STARRS 1	·	1.2 km	MPC · JPL
604114	2015 KA_{171}	—	November 14, 2012	Kitt Peak	Spacewatch	·	800 m	MPC · JPL
604115	2015 KO_{171}	—	May 25, 2015	Haleakala	Pan-STARRS 1	·	1.6 km	MPC · JPL
604116	2015 KP_{171}	—	May 25, 2015	Haleakala	Pan-STARRS 1	GEF	760 m	MPC · JPL
604117	2015 KU_{171}	—	January 9, 2014	Haleakala	Pan-STARRS 1	EUP	2.6 km	MPC · JPL
604118	2015 KQ_{172}	—	May 20, 2015	Haleakala	Pan-STARRS 1	·	2.9 km	MPC · JPL
604119	2015 KW_{172}	—	May 21, 2015	Haleakala	Pan-STARRS 1	·	1.1 km	MPC · JPL
604120	2015 KA_{179}	—	May 18, 2015	Haleakala	Pan-STARRS 2	·	1.3 km	MPC · JPL
604121	2015 KF_{184}	—	May 18, 2015	Haleakala	Pan-STARRS 1	(194)	1.3 km	MPC · JPL
604122	2015 KO_{184}	—	May 24, 2015	Haleakala	Pan-STARRS 1	HNS	840 m	MPC · JPL
604123	2015 KK_{185}	—	February 28, 2008	Mount Lemmon	Mount Lemmon Survey	·	490 m	MPC · JPL
604124	2015 KX_{187}	—	May 25, 2015	Haleakala	Pan-STARRS 1	·	1.0 km	MPC · JPL
604125	2015 KP_{197}	—	May 21, 2015	Haleakala	Pan-STARRS 1	·	1.0 km	MPC · JPL
604126	2015 KU_{205}	—	May 21, 2015	Haleakala	Pan-STARRS 1	(16286)	1.3 km	MPC · JPL
604127	2015 LB	—	March 28, 2015	Haleakala	Pan-STARRS 1	BAR	1.0 km	MPC · JPL
604128	2015 LL	—	February 16, 2015	Haleakala	Pan-STARRS 1	·	1.5 km	MPC · JPL
604129	2015 LD_{1}	—	April 2, 2006	Mount Lemmon	Mount Lemmon Survey	·	1.2 km	MPC · JPL
604130	2015 LD_{3}	—	February 15, 2015	Haleakala	Pan-STARRS 1	·	1.4 km	MPC · JPL
604131	2015 LH_{3}	—	March 22, 2015	Haleakala	Pan-STARRS 1	·	1.2 km	MPC · JPL
604132	2015 LY_{4}	—	October 10, 1999	Kitt Peak	Spacewatch	·	1.5 km	MPC · JPL
604133	2015 LG_{5}	—	March 22, 2015	Haleakala	Pan-STARRS 1	EUN	1.2 km	MPC · JPL
604134	2015 LT_{5}	—	March 22, 2015	Haleakala	Pan-STARRS 1	·	1.6 km	MPC · JPL
604135	2015 LP_{10}	—	June 9, 2015	Haleakala	Pan-STARRS 1	·	1.5 km	MPC · JPL
604136	2015 LD_{11}	—	December 13, 2006	Socorro	LINEAR	·	2.8 km	MPC · JPL
604137	2015 LS_{13}	—	January 4, 2014	Haleakala	Pan-STARRS 1	·	1.5 km	MPC · JPL
604138	2015 LU_{13}	—	June 7, 2015	Haleakala	Pan-STARRS 1	EUN	770 m	MPC · JPL
604139	2015 LF_{16}	—	October 25, 2008	Kitt Peak	Spacewatch	·	1.1 km	MPC · JPL
604140	2015 LL_{19}	—	June 11, 2015	Haleakala	Pan-STARRS 1	·	1.5 km	MPC · JPL
604141	2015 LO_{19}	—	November 2, 2008	Mount Lemmon	Mount Lemmon Survey	·	1.4 km	MPC · JPL
604142	2015 LO_{20}	—	September 6, 2002	Campo Imperatore	CINEOS	·	2.5 km	MPC · JPL
604143	2015 LR_{23}	—	February 25, 2015	Haleakala	Pan-STARRS 1	·	1.8 km	MPC · JPL
604144	2015 LC_{25}	—	September 13, 2007	Mount Lemmon	Mount Lemmon Survey	·	2.0 km	MPC · JPL
604145	2015 LZ_{26}	—	June 13, 2015	Haleakala	Pan-STARRS 1	·	1.4 km	MPC · JPL
604146	2015 LF_{27}	—	February 10, 2014	Haleakala	Pan-STARRS 1	·	1.3 km	MPC · JPL
604147	2015 LN_{28}	—	June 13, 2015	Haleakala	Pan-STARRS 1	·	1.2 km	MPC · JPL
604148	2015 LJ_{32}	—	November 2, 2007	Kitt Peak	Spacewatch	AGN	970 m	MPC · JPL
604149	2015 LJ_{33}	—	October 10, 2002	Palomar	NEAT	·	1.9 km	MPC · JPL
604150	2015 LE_{36}	—	June 16, 2015	Haleakala	Pan-STARRS 1	·	1.1 km	MPC · JPL
604151	2015 LM_{38}	—	April 13, 2002	Palomar	NEAT	·	1.7 km	MPC · JPL
604152	2015 LT_{38}	—	June 15, 2015	Haleakala	Pan-STARRS 1	·	1.7 km	MPC · JPL
604153	2015 LB_{39}	—	September 27, 2013	Piszkéstető	K. Sárneczky	H	470 m	MPC · JPL
604154	2015 LG_{40}	—	April 23, 2015	Haleakala	Pan-STARRS 1	·	1.0 km	MPC · JPL
604155	2015 LW_{40}	—	May 25, 2015	Catalina	CSS	H	480 m	MPC · JPL
604156	2015 LP_{43}	—	June 5, 2015	Haleakala	Pan-STARRS 1	·	3.5 km	MPC · JPL
604157	2015 LN_{44}	—	June 11, 2015	Haleakala	Pan-STARRS 1	·	1.8 km	MPC · JPL
604158	2015 LY_{45}	—	June 15, 2015	Haleakala	Pan-STARRS 1	KOR	1.2 km	MPC · JPL
604159	2015 LR_{48}	—	October 26, 2016	Haleakala	Pan-STARRS 1	·	870 m	MPC · JPL
604160	2015 LN_{52}	—	June 15, 2015	Haleakala	Pan-STARRS 1	·	1.6 km	MPC · JPL
604161	2015 LV_{52}	—	September 13, 2007	Mount Lemmon	Mount Lemmon Survey	·	1.1 km	MPC · JPL
604162	2015 LB_{54}	—	June 11, 2015	Haleakala	Pan-STARRS 1	·	1.4 km	MPC · JPL
604163	2015 MS	—	March 22, 2015	Haleakala	Pan-STARRS 1	·	1.7 km	MPC · JPL
604164	2015 MP_{2}	—	June 16, 2015	Haleakala	Pan-STARRS 1	·	2.2 km	MPC · JPL
604165	2015 MZ_{5}	—	July 25, 2006	Palomar	NEAT	·	2.2 km	MPC · JPL
604166	2015 MB_{10}	—	June 16, 2015	Haleakala	Pan-STARRS 1	·	1.8 km	MPC · JPL
604167	2015 MC_{12}	—	May 8, 2006	Mount Lemmon	Mount Lemmon Survey	EUN	1.1 km	MPC · JPL
604168	2015 MV_{13}	—	May 25, 2015	Haleakala	Pan-STARRS 1	·	1.7 km	MPC · JPL
604169	2015 MU_{17}	—	October 8, 2012	Mount Lemmon	Mount Lemmon Survey	ARM	2.6 km	MPC · JPL
604170	2015 MY_{19}	—	March 19, 2001	Apache Point	SDSS Collaboration	WAT	1.3 km	MPC · JPL
604171	2015 MY_{20}	—	November 1, 2008	Mount Lemmon	Mount Lemmon Survey	HNS	860 m	MPC · JPL
604172	2015 ME_{22}	—	September 4, 2004	Palomar	NEAT	·	1.4 km	MPC · JPL
604173	2015 MS_{23}	—	January 2, 2012	Mount Lemmon	Mount Lemmon Survey	L4	7.2 km	MPC · JPL
604174	2015 MB_{24}	—	October 24, 2008	Kitt Peak	Spacewatch	·	1.3 km	MPC · JPL
604175	2015 ML_{24}	—	January 11, 2010	Kitt Peak	Spacewatch	·	1.2 km	MPC · JPL
604176	2015 MW_{27}	—	January 20, 2015	Haleakala	Pan-STARRS 1	·	1.3 km	MPC · JPL
604177	2015 MA_{29}	—	October 6, 2012	Mount Lemmon	Mount Lemmon Survey	·	1.4 km	MPC · JPL
604178	2015 MO_{29}	—	January 23, 2006	Kitt Peak	Spacewatch	·	960 m	MPC · JPL
604179	2015 MZ_{29}	—	May 25, 2015	Catalina	CSS	·	1.3 km	MPC · JPL
604180	2015 MW_{32}	—	February 24, 2015	Haleakala	Pan-STARRS 1	JUN	810 m	MPC · JPL
604181	2015 MD_{33}	—	September 30, 2011	Mount Lemmon	Mount Lemmon Survey	·	3.0 km	MPC · JPL
604182	2015 MC_{34}	—	April 14, 2015	Mount Lemmon	Mount Lemmon Survey	BRA	1.4 km	MPC · JPL
604183	2015 MH_{36}	—	August 24, 2007	Kitt Peak	Spacewatch	·	1.4 km	MPC · JPL
604184	2015 MQ_{36}	—	December 19, 2001	Kitt Peak	Spacewatch	·	3.1 km	MPC · JPL
604185	2015 MG_{37}	—	May 19, 2015	Haleakala	Pan-STARRS 1	·	2.2 km	MPC · JPL
604186	2015 MV_{42}	—	March 31, 2015	Haleakala	Pan-STARRS 1	·	1.4 km	MPC · JPL
604187	2015 MY_{42}	—	May 18, 2015	Haleakala	Pan-STARRS 1	·	1.8 km	MPC · JPL
604188	2015 MD_{43}	—	June 18, 2015	Haleakala	Pan-STARRS 1	·	2.2 km	MPC · JPL
604189	2015 MW_{43}	—	September 4, 2007	Mount Lemmon	Mount Lemmon Survey	MAR	930 m	MPC · JPL
604190	2015 MK_{49}	—	March 9, 2005	Mount Lemmon	Mount Lemmon Survey	·	2.2 km	MPC · JPL
604191	2015 MT_{52}	—	February 28, 2014	Haleakala	Pan-STARRS 1	·	1.5 km	MPC · JPL
604192	2015 MJ_{55}	—	March 31, 2015	Haleakala	Pan-STARRS 1	·	940 m	MPC · JPL
604193	2015 MV_{55}	—	April 18, 2015	Haleakala	Pan-STARRS 1	·	1.3 km	MPC · JPL
604194	2015 MW_{57}	—	June 12, 2011	Mount Lemmon	Mount Lemmon Survey	·	1.5 km	MPC · JPL
604195	2015 MT_{62}	—	April 9, 2010	Mount Lemmon	Mount Lemmon Survey	·	1.5 km	MPC · JPL
604196	2015 MB_{63}	—	October 24, 2011	Kitt Peak	Spacewatch	·	1.8 km	MPC · JPL
604197	2015 MO_{66}	—	June 22, 2015	Haleakala	Pan-STARRS 1	APO	340 m	MPC · JPL
604198	2015 ML_{67}	—	April 14, 2002	Socorro	LINEAR	·	1.3 km	MPC · JPL
604199	2015 MZ_{67}	—	March 6, 2014	Mount Lemmon	Mount Lemmon Survey	·	1.4 km	MPC · JPL
604200	2015 MT_{70}	—	January 4, 2013	Cerro Tololo-DECam	DECam	·	1.6 km	MPC · JPL

== 604201–604300 ==
back to top

Designation			Discovery			Properties		Ref
Permanent	Provisional	Named after	Date	Site	Discoverer(s)	Category	Diam.	Ref
604201	2015 MR_{75}	—	October 23, 2008	Kitt Peak	Spacewatch	·	870 m	MPC · JPL
604202	2015 MW_{80}	—	June 18, 2015	Haleakala	Pan-STARRS 1	·	1.1 km	MPC · JPL
604203	2015 MD_{83}	—	April 6, 2014	Mount Lemmon	Mount Lemmon Survey	·	1.8 km	MPC · JPL
604204	2015 MM_{84}	—	July 31, 2005	Palomar	NEAT	EOS	2.4 km	MPC · JPL
604205	2015 MP_{84}	—	July 28, 2003	Palomar	NEAT	·	5.5 km	MPC · JPL
604206	2015 MO_{92}	—	January 1, 2014	Kitt Peak	Spacewatch	·	1.6 km	MPC · JPL
604207	2015 MH_{93}	—	June 10, 2015	Haleakala	Pan-STARRS 1	·	1.5 km	MPC · JPL
604208	2015 MY_{98}	—	June 23, 2015	Haleakala	Pan-STARRS 1	·	1.5 km	MPC · JPL
604209	2015 MH_{100}	—	September 4, 2011	Haleakala	Pan-STARRS 1	HOF	2.1 km	MPC · JPL
604210	2015 MK_{102}	—	October 23, 2011	Haleakala	Pan-STARRS 1	·	1.5 km	MPC · JPL
604211	2015 MD_{105}	—	December 21, 2012	Mount Lemmon	Mount Lemmon Survey	·	1.8 km	MPC · JPL
604212	2015 MJ_{111}	—	May 1, 2006	Kitt Peak	Spacewatch	·	1.5 km	MPC · JPL
604213	2015 MX_{111}	—	November 24, 2006	Mauna Kea	D. D. Balam, K. M. Perrett	·	1.7 km	MPC · JPL
604214	2015 MD_{113}	—	June 27, 2015	Haleakala	Pan-STARRS 1	BRA	1.2 km	MPC · JPL
604215	2015 MP_{116}	—	June 5, 2011	Mount Lemmon	Mount Lemmon Survey	·	1.5 km	MPC · JPL
604216	2015 MK_{120}	—	April 23, 2014	Cerro Tololo-DECam	DECam	DOR	1.7 km	MPC · JPL
604217	2015 MH_{122}	—	October 22, 2011	Mount Lemmon	Mount Lemmon Survey	·	1.4 km	MPC · JPL
604218	2015 MS_{122}	—	March 8, 2014	Mount Lemmon	Mount Lemmon Survey	·	990 m	MPC · JPL
604219	2015 MX_{123}	—	June 28, 2015	Haleakala	Pan-STARRS 1	·	2.2 km	MPC · JPL
604220	2015 ME_{127}	—	May 6, 2014	Mount Lemmon	Mount Lemmon Survey	·	1.6 km	MPC · JPL
604221	2015 MZ_{132}	—	April 2, 2005	Kitt Peak	Spacewatch	·	1.4 km	MPC · JPL
604222	2015 MZ_{135}	—	June 27, 2015	Haleakala	Pan-STARRS 1	·	2.2 km	MPC · JPL
604223	2015 MX_{137}	—	December 30, 2008	Kitt Peak	Spacewatch	·	1.5 km	MPC · JPL
604224	2015 MZ_{140}	—	February 26, 2014	Haleakala	Pan-STARRS 1	·	1.3 km	MPC · JPL
604225	2015 MA_{141}	—	June 18, 2015	Haleakala	Pan-STARRS 1	·	1.3 km	MPC · JPL
604226	2015 MF_{142}	—	September 13, 2005	Kitt Peak	Spacewatch	·	1.7 km	MPC · JPL
604227	2015 MK_{144}	—	June 24, 2015	Haleakala	Pan-STARRS 1	·	2.5 km	MPC · JPL
604228	2015 MA_{147}	—	June 26, 2015	Haleakala	Pan-STARRS 1	VER	2.5 km	MPC · JPL
604229	2015 MD_{147}	—	March 14, 2013	Kitt Peak	Spacewatch	·	3.0 km	MPC · JPL
604230	2015 MM_{149}	—	August 27, 2011	Haleakala	Pan-STARRS 1	EUN	930 m	MPC · JPL
604231	2015 MH_{150}	—	June 18, 2015	Haleakala	Pan-STARRS 1	·	1.2 km	MPC · JPL
604232	2015 ML_{155}	—	January 5, 2013	Kitt Peak	Spacewatch	·	960 m	MPC · JPL
604233	2015 MF_{156}	—	June 21, 2015	Mount Lemmon	Mount Lemmon Survey	·	820 m	MPC · JPL
604234	2015 MW_{163}	—	May 7, 2014	Haleakala	Pan-STARRS 1	·	1.9 km	MPC · JPL
604235	2015 MC_{167}	—	June 27, 2015	Haleakala	Pan-STARRS 1	NAE	2.0 km	MPC · JPL
604236	2015 MS_{167}	—	June 27, 2015	Haleakala	Pan-STARRS 1	·	1.6 km	MPC · JPL
604237	2015 MR_{178}	—	June 26, 2015	Haleakala	Pan-STARRS 1	·	1.7 km	MPC · JPL
604238	2015 MD_{182}	—	November 7, 2012	Haleakala	Pan-STARRS 1	EUN	1.0 km	MPC · JPL
604239	2015 MB_{186}	—	June 18, 2015	Haleakala	Pan-STARRS 1	·	2.1 km	MPC · JPL
604240	2015 MC_{186}	—	June 19, 2015	Haleakala	Pan-STARRS 1	EUP	2.2 km	MPC · JPL
604241	2015 NK	—	February 16, 2004	Kitt Peak	Spacewatch	·	1.2 km	MPC · JPL
604242	2015 NE_{2}	—	April 15, 2010	Mount Lemmon	Mount Lemmon Survey	·	1.8 km	MPC · JPL
604243	2015 NL_{5}	—	September 22, 2011	Kitt Peak	Spacewatch	·	1.1 km	MPC · JPL
604244	2015 NB_{9}	—	September 19, 1998	Apache Point	SDSS Collaboration	·	1.2 km	MPC · JPL
604245	2015 NE_{11}	—	March 28, 2015	Haleakala	Pan-STARRS 1	·	1.1 km	MPC · JPL
604246	2015 NQ_{14}	—	August 23, 2011	Haleakala	Pan-STARRS 1	·	1.8 km	MPC · JPL
604247	2015 NM_{16}	—	September 10, 2010	Bisei	BATTeRS	·	2.0 km	MPC · JPL
604248	2015 NM_{19}	—	July 12, 2015	Haleakala	Pan-STARRS 1	·	2.1 km	MPC · JPL
604249	2015 NY_{19}	—	May 30, 2006	Mount Lemmon	Mount Lemmon Survey	·	2.4 km	MPC · JPL
604250	2015 NW_{20}	—	October 17, 2012	Haleakala	Pan-STARRS 1	·	2.9 km	MPC · JPL
604251	2015 NA_{21}	—	June 28, 2011	Mount Lemmon	Mount Lemmon Survey	·	680 m	MPC · JPL
604252	2015 NC_{21}	—	June 23, 1995	Kitt Peak	Spacewatch	(5)	1.2 km	MPC · JPL
604253	2015 NX_{26}	—	April 18, 2009	Mount Lemmon	Mount Lemmon Survey	·	2.3 km	MPC · JPL
604254	2015 NH_{30}	—	July 8, 2015	Haleakala	Pan-STARRS 1	BRA	1.3 km	MPC · JPL
604255	2015 NW_{36}	—	July 12, 2015	Haleakala	Pan-STARRS 1	·	2.0 km	MPC · JPL
604256	2015 NZ_{36}	—	July 12, 2015	Haleakala	Pan-STARRS 1	·	2.1 km	MPC · JPL
604257	2015 OK_{2}	—	July 5, 2011	Haleakala	Pan-STARRS 1	(1547)	1.1 km	MPC · JPL
604258	2015 OC_{7}	—	August 6, 2005	Palomar	NEAT	EOS	1.9 km	MPC · JPL
604259	2015 OF_{7}	—	July 18, 2015	Haleakala	Pan-STARRS 1	·	1.8 km	MPC · JPL
604260	2015 OR_{7}	—	August 30, 2005	Kitt Peak	Spacewatch	EOS	1.7 km	MPC · JPL
604261	2015 OP_{9}	—	August 30, 2005	Palomar	NEAT	EOS	1.9 km	MPC · JPL
604262	2015 OS_{14}	—	April 6, 2014	Mount Lemmon	Mount Lemmon Survey	·	2.1 km	MPC · JPL
604263	2015 OV_{15}	—	October 9, 2004	Kitt Peak	Spacewatch	·	1.2 km	MPC · JPL
604264	2015 ON_{17}	—	July 18, 2015	Haleakala	Pan-STARRS 1	EOS	1.5 km	MPC · JPL
604265	2015 OY_{18}	—	June 20, 2015	Haleakala	Pan-STARRS 2	·	1.3 km	MPC · JPL
604266	2015 OR_{23}	—	July 20, 2015	Cerro Paranal	Altmann, M., Prusti, T.	·	1.6 km	MPC · JPL
604267	2015 OS_{32}	—	May 24, 2014	Haleakala	Pan-STARRS 1	·	2.6 km	MPC · JPL
604268	2015 OB_{34}	—	February 5, 2013	Mount Lemmon	Mount Lemmon Survey	·	1.5 km	MPC · JPL
604269	2015 OC_{34}	—	September 24, 2011	Haleakala	Pan-STARRS 1	·	1.6 km	MPC · JPL
604270	2015 OQ_{38}	—	January 10, 2007	Kitt Peak	Spacewatch	·	2.2 km	MPC · JPL
604271	2015 OY_{39}	—	October 16, 2002	Palomar	NEAT	·	1.6 km	MPC · JPL
604272	2015 OB_{40}	—	June 27, 2015	Haleakala	Pan-STARRS 1	·	1.4 km	MPC · JPL
604273	2015 ON_{44}	—	June 13, 2015	Haleakala	Pan-STARRS 1	·	1.3 km	MPC · JPL
604274	2015 OC_{48}	—	February 16, 2004	Kitt Peak	Spacewatch	·	2.2 km	MPC · JPL
604275	2015 OT_{53}	—	July 19, 2015	Haleakala	Pan-STARRS 2	·	1.6 km	MPC · JPL
604276	2015 OK_{56}	—	April 9, 2003	Kitt Peak	Spacewatch	TIR	2.2 km	MPC · JPL
604277	2015 OK_{58}	—	May 8, 2014	Haleakala	Pan-STARRS 1	·	2.2 km	MPC · JPL
604278	2015 OS_{59}	—	July 26, 2015	Haleakala	Pan-STARRS 1	EOS	1.3 km	MPC · JPL
604279	2015 OG_{60}	—	September 19, 1998	Apache Point	SDSS	EUN	1.1 km	MPC · JPL
604280	2015 OK_{60}	—	April 29, 2014	Haleakala	Pan-STARRS 1	EOS	1.3 km	MPC · JPL
604281	2015 OD_{61}	—	November 24, 2011	Mount Lemmon	Mount Lemmon Survey	EOS	1.7 km	MPC · JPL
604282	2015 OL_{61}	—	July 26, 2015	Haleakala	Pan-STARRS 1	·	2.7 km	MPC · JPL
604283	2015 OJ_{62}	—	July 26, 2015	Haleakala	Pan-STARRS 1	·	1.9 km	MPC · JPL
604284	2015 OO_{65}	—	July 26, 2015	Haleakala	Pan-STARRS 1	·	1.4 km	MPC · JPL
604285	2015 OV_{65}	—	August 14, 2006	Siding Spring	SSS	·	2.5 km	MPC · JPL
604286	2015 OH_{66}	—	October 5, 2005	Catalina	CSS	·	2.0 km	MPC · JPL
604287	2015 OZ_{66}	—	October 14, 2007	Kitt Peak	Spacewatch	·	1.7 km	MPC · JPL
604288	2015 OT_{68}	—	February 3, 2013	Haleakala	Pan-STARRS 1	·	2.2 km	MPC · JPL
604289	2015 OE_{69}	—	November 2, 2011	Mount Lemmon	Mount Lemmon Survey	·	1.6 km	MPC · JPL
604290	2015 OR_{70}	—	August 27, 2006	Kitt Peak	Spacewatch	HOF	2.4 km	MPC · JPL
604291	2015 OG_{75}	—	July 25, 2015	Haleakala	Pan-STARRS 1	·	1.7 km	MPC · JPL
604292	2015 OE_{81}	—	January 24, 2014	Haleakala	Pan-STARRS 1	H	290 m	MPC · JPL
604293	2015 OF_{86}	—	July 24, 2015	Haleakala	Pan-STARRS 1	EOS	1.4 km	MPC · JPL
604294	2015 OS_{86}	—	July 25, 2015	Haleakala	Pan-STARRS 1	·	2.4 km	MPC · JPL
604295	2015 ON_{88}	—	December 4, 2010	Mount Lemmon	Mount Lemmon Survey	·	2.5 km	MPC · JPL
604296	2015 OR_{88}	—	November 24, 2011	Mount Lemmon	Mount Lemmon Survey	BRA	1.4 km	MPC · JPL
604297	2015 ON_{91}	—	March 9, 2005	Kitt Peak	Spacewatch	·	1.9 km	MPC · JPL
604298	2015 OL_{92}	—	July 19, 2015	Haleakala	Pan-STARRS 1	·	2.1 km	MPC · JPL
604299	2015 OV_{95}	—	July 23, 2015	Haleakala	Pan-STARRS 1	·	2.3 km	MPC · JPL
604300	2015 OH_{96}	—	September 11, 2004	Kitt Peak	Spacewatch	·	1.9 km	MPC · JPL

== 604301–604400 ==
back to top

Designation			Discovery			Properties		Ref
Permanent	Provisional	Named after	Date	Site	Discoverer(s)	Category	Diam.	Ref
604301	2015 OZ_{96}	—	July 23, 2015	Haleakala	Pan-STARRS 1	·	1.9 km	MPC · JPL
604302	2015 OP_{99}	—	September 18, 2010	Mount Lemmon	Mount Lemmon Survey	EOS	1.8 km	MPC · JPL
604303	2015 OW_{100}	—	April 6, 2008	Mount Lemmon	Mount Lemmon Survey	·	2.0 km	MPC · JPL
604304	2015 OL_{101}	—	March 10, 2008	Kitt Peak	Spacewatch	EOS	1.4 km	MPC · JPL
604305	2015 OO_{101}	—	December 25, 2011	Piszkés-tető	K. Sárneczky, S. Kürti	·	1.9 km	MPC · JPL
604306	2015 OD_{102}	—	December 2, 2010	Mount Lemmon	Mount Lemmon Survey	·	2.4 km	MPC · JPL
604307	2015 OG_{102}	—	October 20, 2011	Mount Lemmon	Mount Lemmon Survey	MAR	650 m	MPC · JPL
604308	2015 OT_{102}	—	July 25, 2015	Haleakala	Pan-STARRS 1	·	2.9 km	MPC · JPL
604309	2015 OQ_{103}	—	April 29, 2014	ESA OGS	ESA OGS	EOS	1.6 km	MPC · JPL
604310	2015 OA_{104}	—	July 26, 2015	Haleakala	Pan-STARRS 1	·	1.4 km	MPC · JPL
604311	2015 OL_{104}	—	June 29, 2015	Haleakala	Pan-STARRS 1	TEL	980 m	MPC · JPL
604312	2015 OE_{105}	—	September 11, 2010	Mount Lemmon	Mount Lemmon Survey	·	1.7 km	MPC · JPL
604313	2015 OW_{105}	—	July 25, 2015	Haleakala	Pan-STARRS 1	·	2.1 km	MPC · JPL
604314	2015 OK_{106}	—	July 23, 2015	Haleakala	Pan-STARRS 1	·	2.8 km	MPC · JPL
604315	2015 OJ_{108}	—	July 26, 2015	Haleakala	Pan-STARRS 1	·	1.4 km	MPC · JPL
604316	2015 OP_{120}	—	July 26, 2015	Haleakala	Pan-STARRS 1	·	2.2 km	MPC · JPL
604317	2015 OD_{122}	—	July 25, 2015	Haleakala	Pan-STARRS 1	·	2.4 km	MPC · JPL
604318	2015 OH_{122}	—	July 25, 2015	Haleakala	Pan-STARRS 1	EOS	1.4 km	MPC · JPL
604319	2015 OW_{123}	—	July 23, 2015	Haleakala	Pan-STARRS 1	·	2.2 km	MPC · JPL
604320	2015 OU_{126}	—	November 2, 2010	Mount Lemmon	Mount Lemmon Survey	·	2.3 km	MPC · JPL
604321	2015 ON_{127}	—	July 25, 2015	Haleakala	Pan-STARRS 1	·	2.3 km	MPC · JPL
604322	2015 OC_{128}	—	July 19, 2015	Haleakala	Pan-STARRS 1	EOS	1.5 km	MPC · JPL
604323	2015 OO_{128}	—	July 25, 2015	Haleakala	Pan-STARRS 1	·	2.5 km	MPC · JPL
604324	2015 OA_{130}	—	July 28, 2015	Haleakala	Pan-STARRS 1	·	1.9 km	MPC · JPL
604325	2015 ON_{131}	—	July 25, 2015	Haleakala	Pan-STARRS 1	·	2.3 km	MPC · JPL
604326	2015 OP_{137}	—	July 24, 2015	Haleakala	Pan-STARRS 1	·	1.9 km	MPC · JPL
604327	2015 OU_{137}	—	July 25, 2015	Haleakala	Pan-STARRS 1	·	1.4 km	MPC · JPL
604328	2015 OB_{143}	—	July 23, 2015	Haleakala	Pan-STARRS 1	·	1.6 km	MPC · JPL
604329	2015 OL_{144}	—	July 28, 2015	Haleakala	Pan-STARRS 1	·	1.0 km	MPC · JPL
604330	2015 OQ_{148}	—	July 19, 2015	Haleakala	Pan-STARRS 1	AGN	930 m	MPC · JPL
604331	2015 PE_{1}	—	November 3, 2011	Mount Lemmon	Mount Lemmon Survey	·	1.3 km	MPC · JPL
604332	2015 PE_{6}	—	August 27, 2011	Haleakala	Pan-STARRS 1	EUN	810 m	MPC · JPL
604333	2015 PT_{6}	—	October 17, 2007	Mount Lemmon	Mount Lemmon Survey	JUN	890 m	MPC · JPL
604334	2015 PT_{7}	—	March 28, 2014	Mount Lemmon	Mount Lemmon Survey	·	2.0 km	MPC · JPL
604335	2015 PX_{7}	—	April 30, 2014	Haleakala	Pan-STARRS 1	·	2.3 km	MPC · JPL
604336	2015 PF_{8}	—	September 26, 2006	Kitt Peak	Spacewatch	·	1.3 km	MPC · JPL
604337	2015 PU_{8}	—	December 29, 2005	Mount Lemmon	Mount Lemmon Survey	·	2.6 km	MPC · JPL
604338	2015 PE_{22}	—	April 3, 2011	Haleakala	Pan-STARRS 1	·	600 m	MPC · JPL
604339	2015 PA_{26}	—	September 26, 2000	Kitt Peak	Spacewatch	·	1.8 km	MPC · JPL
604340	2015 PU_{29}	—	June 25, 2015	Haleakala	Pan-STARRS 1	DOR	2.0 km	MPC · JPL
604341	2015 PE_{30}	—	August 24, 2011	Haleakala	Pan-STARRS 1	MAR	1.0 km	MPC · JPL
604342	2015 PL_{33}	—	August 8, 2015	Haleakala	Pan-STARRS 1	·	1.5 km	MPC · JPL
604343	2015 PS_{33}	—	September 28, 2011	Kitt Peak	Spacewatch	·	1.4 km	MPC · JPL
604344	2015 PW_{33}	—	August 30, 2011	Piszkéstető	K. Sárneczky	·	590 m	MPC · JPL
604345	2015 PX_{40}	—	September 24, 2011	Haleakala	Pan-STARRS 1	·	2.4 km	MPC · JPL
604346	2015 PL_{41}	—	March 24, 2014	Haleakala	Pan-STARRS 1	·	1.5 km	MPC · JPL
604347	2015 PT_{43}	—	July 12, 2015	Haleakala	Pan-STARRS 1	MAR	760 m	MPC · JPL
604348	2015 PB_{44}	—	April 30, 2009	Kitt Peak	Spacewatch	·	1.8 km	MPC · JPL
604349	2015 PK_{46}	—	January 19, 2013	Kitt Peak	Spacewatch	·	1.5 km	MPC · JPL
604350	2015 PP_{48}	—	September 14, 2007	Mount Lemmon	Mount Lemmon Survey	·	1.4 km	MPC · JPL
604351	2015 PW_{50}	—	April 9, 2003	Palomar	NEAT	TIR	2.4 km	MPC · JPL
604352	2015 PY_{50}	—	August 9, 2015	Haleakala	Pan-STARRS 1	·	1.7 km	MPC · JPL
604353	2015 PQ_{52}	—	October 31, 2005	Kitt Peak	Spacewatch	·	2.4 km	MPC · JPL
604354	2015 PY_{53}	—	May 3, 2014	Mount Lemmon	Mount Lemmon Survey	·	1.9 km	MPC · JPL
604355	2015 PO_{56}	—	January 27, 2012	Mount Lemmon	Mount Lemmon Survey	EOS	1.7 km	MPC · JPL
604356	2015 PN_{59}	—	July 12, 2015	Haleakala	Pan-STARRS 1	EOS	1.3 km	MPC · JPL
604357	2015 PW_{59}	—	May 9, 2014	Haleakala	Pan-STARRS 1	·	2.1 km	MPC · JPL
604358	2015 PA_{64}	—	April 2, 2009	Kitt Peak	Spacewatch	·	1.2 km	MPC · JPL
604359	2015 PU_{64}	—	June 18, 2015	Haleakala	Pan-STARRS 1	KOR	1.0 km	MPC · JPL
604360	2015 PZ_{68}	—	January 11, 2008	Kitt Peak	Spacewatch	·	1.2 km	MPC · JPL
604361	2015 PE_{71}	—	October 23, 2011	Haleakala	Pan-STARRS 1	·	1.7 km	MPC · JPL
604362	2015 PY_{77}	—	September 20, 2011	Kitt Peak	Spacewatch	·	1.7 km	MPC · JPL
604363	2015 PC_{78}	—	September 14, 2005	Kitt Peak	Spacewatch	·	2.3 km	MPC · JPL
604364	2015 PN_{85}	—	February 20, 2009	Kitt Peak	Spacewatch	·	1.6 km	MPC · JPL
604365	2015 PO_{96}	—	September 14, 2006	Kitt Peak	Spacewatch	KOR	1.4 km	MPC · JPL
604366	2015 PA_{102}	—	March 29, 2009	Catalina	CSS	GEF	1.0 km	MPC · JPL
604367	2015 PB_{104}	—	February 28, 2014	Haleakala	Pan-STARRS 1	·	940 m	MPC · JPL
604368	2015 PJ_{104}	—	January 20, 2009	Kitt Peak	Spacewatch	·	1.6 km	MPC · JPL
604369	2015 PK_{106}	—	October 20, 1995	Kitt Peak	Spacewatch	·	1.5 km	MPC · JPL
604370	2015 PX_{110}	—	August 19, 2006	Kitt Peak	Spacewatch	·	1.7 km	MPC · JPL
604371	2015 PB_{112}	—	March 23, 2004	Kitt Peak	Spacewatch	·	1.5 km	MPC · JPL
604372	2015 PC_{113}	—	December 31, 2007	Kitt Peak	Spacewatch	·	1.3 km	MPC · JPL
604373	2015 PD_{117}	—	November 9, 1999	Kitt Peak	Spacewatch	·	1.1 km	MPC · JPL
604374	2015 PK_{121}	—	October 21, 2007	Kitt Peak	Spacewatch	·	1.2 km	MPC · JPL
604375	2015 PX_{123}	—	April 5, 2014	Haleakala	Pan-STARRS 1	·	1.4 km	MPC · JPL
604376	2015 PK_{125}	—	February 13, 2008	Kitt Peak	Spacewatch	·	1.8 km	MPC · JPL
604377	2015 PP_{125}	—	July 25, 2015	Haleakala	Pan-STARRS 1	KOR	1.2 km	MPC · JPL
604378	2015 PH_{127}	—	April 21, 2014	Mount Lemmon	Mount Lemmon Survey	·	2.0 km	MPC · JPL
604379	2015 PS_{130}	—	May 7, 2014	Haleakala	Pan-STARRS 1	·	2.5 km	MPC · JPL
604380	2015 PE_{135}	—	August 10, 2015	Haleakala	Pan-STARRS 1	·	1.6 km	MPC · JPL
604381	2015 PK_{136}	—	August 9, 2005	Cerro Tololo	Deep Ecliptic Survey	·	1.3 km	MPC · JPL
604382	2015 PA_{139}	—	August 10, 2015	Haleakala	Pan-STARRS 1	·	1.6 km	MPC · JPL
604383	2015 PH_{143}	—	January 22, 2013	Mount Lemmon	Mount Lemmon Survey	·	1.3 km	MPC · JPL
604384	2015 PM_{143}	—	January 15, 2013	ESA OGS	ESA OGS	·	1.6 km	MPC · JPL
604385	2015 PW_{144}	—	January 28, 2007	Kitt Peak	Spacewatch	·	710 m	MPC · JPL
604386	2015 PA_{147}	—	May 8, 2014	Haleakala	Pan-STARRS 1	·	1.5 km	MPC · JPL
604387	2015 PN_{150}	—	July 24, 2015	Haleakala	Pan-STARRS 1	·	1.4 km	MPC · JPL
604388	2015 PR_{150}	—	October 1, 2005	Mount Lemmon	Mount Lemmon Survey	·	2.0 km	MPC · JPL
604389	2015 PJ_{162}	—	August 27, 2006	Kitt Peak	Spacewatch	·	1.5 km	MPC · JPL
604390	2015 PB_{163}	—	September 17, 2010	Mount Lemmon	Mount Lemmon Survey	·	2.0 km	MPC · JPL
604391	2015 PC_{166}	—	December 23, 2012	Haleakala	Pan-STARRS 1	·	1.5 km	MPC · JPL
604392	2015 PK_{172}	—	September 2, 2010	Mount Lemmon	Mount Lemmon Survey	EOS	1.2 km	MPC · JPL
604393	2015 PG_{186}	—	April 17, 1998	Kitt Peak	Spacewatch	·	1.1 km	MPC · JPL
604394	2015 PG_{189}	—	February 11, 2004	Kitt Peak	Spacewatch	·	1.6 km	MPC · JPL
604395	2015 PU_{191}	—	May 24, 2014	Haleakala	Pan-STARRS 1	EOS	1.3 km	MPC · JPL
604396	2015 PZ_{191}	—	October 26, 2011	Haleakala	Pan-STARRS 1	·	1.7 km	MPC · JPL
604397	2015 PD_{193}	—	May 20, 2014	Haleakala	Pan-STARRS 1	·	2.2 km	MPC · JPL
604398	2015 PJ_{194}	—	June 17, 2015	Haleakala	Pan-STARRS 1	EOS	1.7 km	MPC · JPL
604399	2015 PQ_{201}	—	April 5, 2014	Haleakala	Pan-STARRS 1	·	2.1 km	MPC · JPL
604400	2015 PQ_{203}	—	May 7, 2014	Haleakala	Pan-STARRS 1	EOS	1.7 km	MPC · JPL

== 604401–604500 ==
back to top

Designation			Discovery			Properties		Ref
Permanent	Provisional	Named after	Date	Site	Discoverer(s)	Category	Diam.	Ref
604401	2015 PN_{205}	—	April 5, 2008	Mount Lemmon	Mount Lemmon Survey	EOS	2.0 km	MPC · JPL
604402	2015 PU_{205}	—	August 10, 2015	Haleakala	Pan-STARRS 1	·	1.8 km	MPC · JPL
604403	2015 PU_{210}	—	August 10, 2015	Haleakala	Pan-STARRS 1	·	2.4 km	MPC · JPL
604404	2015 PT_{211}	—	June 25, 2015	Haleakala	Pan-STARRS 1	·	1.8 km	MPC · JPL
604405	2015 PF_{218}	—	January 10, 2013	Haleakala	Pan-STARRS 1	·	3.1 km	MPC · JPL
604406	2015 PY_{218}	—	August 25, 2011	Piszkés-tető	K. Sárneczky, S. Kürti	·	1.8 km	MPC · JPL
604407	2015 PG_{223}	—	December 31, 2011	Mount Lemmon	Mount Lemmon Survey	·	2.8 km	MPC · JPL
604408	2015 PJ_{231}	—	February 11, 2008	Mount Lemmon	Mount Lemmon Survey	·	2.5 km	MPC · JPL
604409	2015 PU_{233}	—	October 24, 2009	Kitt Peak	Spacewatch	·	510 m	MPC · JPL
604410	2015 PM_{234}	—	February 2, 2008	Mount Lemmon	Mount Lemmon Survey	·	2.0 km	MPC · JPL
604411	2015 PW_{237}	—	March 24, 2014	Haleakala	Pan-STARRS 1	·	1.6 km	MPC · JPL
604412	2015 PS_{240}	—	December 17, 2003	Kitt Peak	Spacewatch	·	1.9 km	MPC · JPL
604413	2015 PR_{244}	—	April 5, 2014	Haleakala	Pan-STARRS 1	·	1.3 km	MPC · JPL
604414	2015 PC_{247}	—	October 25, 2011	Kitt Peak	Spacewatch	·	1.5 km	MPC · JPL
604415	2015 PV_{248}	—	November 12, 2005	Kitt Peak	Spacewatch	·	2.1 km	MPC · JPL
604416	2015 PL_{251}	—	May 7, 2006	Mount Lemmon	Mount Lemmon Survey	·	1.2 km	MPC · JPL
604417	2015 PO_{252}	—	December 16, 2011	Mount Lemmon	Mount Lemmon Survey	·	1.6 km	MPC · JPL
604418	2015 PG_{254}	—	April 24, 2014	Haleakala	Pan-STARRS 1	EOS	1.6 km	MPC · JPL
604419	2015 PC_{255}	—	June 11, 2015	Haleakala	Pan-STARRS 1	GAL	1.7 km	MPC · JPL
604420	2015 PM_{257}	—	May 3, 2014	Mount Lemmon	Mount Lemmon Survey	·	1.7 km	MPC · JPL
604421	2015 PS_{257}	—	June 18, 2015	Haleakala	Pan-STARRS 1	KOR	950 m	MPC · JPL
604422	2015 PE_{260}	—	March 18, 2009	Bergisch Gladbach	W. Bickel	·	1.8 km	MPC · JPL
604423	2015 PB_{262}	—	January 17, 2009	Kitt Peak	Spacewatch	·	1.4 km	MPC · JPL
604424	2015 PF_{262}	—	December 19, 2012	Calar Alto-CASADO	Mottola, S.	·	1.3 km	MPC · JPL
604425	2015 PT_{264}	—	May 26, 2007	Mount Lemmon	Mount Lemmon Survey	·	1.0 km	MPC · JPL
604426	2015 PB_{268}	—	October 10, 2008	Kitt Peak	Spacewatch	·	910 m	MPC · JPL
604427	2015 PU_{268}	—	August 27, 2005	Kitt Peak	Spacewatch	EOS	1.4 km	MPC · JPL
604428	2015 PH_{271}	—	March 8, 2013	Haleakala	Pan-STARRS 1	·	1.5 km	MPC · JPL
604429 Lokhorst	2015 PD_{274}	Lokhorst	June 12, 2007	Mauna Kea	D. D. Balam, K. M. Perrett	3:2	4.4 km	MPC · JPL
604430	2015 PP_{275}	—	April 9, 2003	Kitt Peak	Spacewatch	·	2.1 km	MPC · JPL
604431	2015 PF_{280}	—	July 24, 2015	Haleakala	Pan-STARRS 1	·	2.2 km	MPC · JPL
604432	2015 PH_{283}	—	October 1, 2000	Apache Point	SDSS Collaboration	EOS	2.0 km	MPC · JPL
604433	2015 PE_{288}	—	October 25, 2005	Kitt Peak	Spacewatch	·	2.2 km	MPC · JPL
604434	2015 PP_{288}	—	October 31, 2010	Mount Lemmon	Mount Lemmon Survey	·	2.3 km	MPC · JPL
604435	2015 PS_{288}	—	March 23, 2003	Apache Point	SDSS Collaboration	·	1.9 km	MPC · JPL
604436	2015 PM_{289}	—	May 20, 2014	Haleakala	Pan-STARRS 1	EOS	1.5 km	MPC · JPL
604437	2015 PF_{292}	—	December 27, 2011	Mount Lemmon	Mount Lemmon Survey	·	2.4 km	MPC · JPL
604438	2015 PH_{292}	—	April 25, 2003	Kitt Peak	Spacewatch	·	2.3 km	MPC · JPL
604439	2015 PL_{300}	—	May 4, 2014	Haleakala	Pan-STARRS 1	·	2.0 km	MPC · JPL
604440	2015 PL_{305}	—	September 7, 2004	Kitt Peak	Spacewatch	(8737)	2.0 km	MPC · JPL
604441	2015 PY_{305}	—	May 10, 2014	Haleakala	Pan-STARRS 1	WIT	890 m	MPC · JPL
604442	2015 PQ_{310}	—	February 7, 2008	Mount Lemmon	Mount Lemmon Survey	T_{j} (2.96)	2.5 km	MPC · JPL
604443	2015 PX_{312}	—	September 2, 2010	Mount Lemmon	Mount Lemmon Survey	H	240 m	MPC · JPL
604444	2015 PN_{313}	—	August 9, 2015	Haleakala	Pan-STARRS 2	·	1.5 km	MPC · JPL
604445	2015 PJ_{315}	—	October 20, 2007	Mount Lemmon	Mount Lemmon Survey	·	1.1 km	MPC · JPL
604446	2015 PX_{317}	—	January 2, 2012	Mount Lemmon	Mount Lemmon Survey	(31811)	2.2 km	MPC · JPL
604447	2015 PU_{320}	—	October 13, 2010	Mount Lemmon	Mount Lemmon Survey	EOS	1.5 km	MPC · JPL
604448	2015 PD_{321}	—	March 29, 2012	Haleakala	Pan-STARRS 1	·	2.6 km	MPC · JPL
604449	2015 PB_{332}	—	August 9, 2015	Haleakala	Pan-STARRS 1	EOS	1.3 km	MPC · JPL
604450	2015 PC_{332}	—	August 12, 2015	Haleakala	Pan-STARRS 1	·	2.2 km	MPC · JPL
604451	2015 PM_{334}	—	August 9, 2015	Haleakala	Pan-STARRS 1	TRE	1.5 km	MPC · JPL
604452	2015 PY_{334}	—	August 12, 2015	Haleakala	Pan-STARRS 1	·	1.4 km	MPC · JPL
604453	2015 PS_{338}	—	May 7, 2014	Haleakala	Pan-STARRS 1	·	1.5 km	MPC · JPL
604454	2015 PV_{346}	—	October 23, 2011	Haleakala	Pan-STARRS 1	BRA	1.1 km	MPC · JPL
604455	2015 QY	—	June 21, 2015	Haleakala	Pan-STARRS 2	·	1.1 km	MPC · JPL
604456	2015 QF_{2}	—	May 30, 2015	Haleakala	Pan-STARRS 1	·	860 m	MPC · JPL
604457	2015 QD_{7}	—	April 30, 2014	Haleakala	Pan-STARRS 1	EOS	1.4 km	MPC · JPL
604458	2015 QU_{7}	—	February 23, 2012	Mount Lemmon	Mount Lemmon Survey	·	2.9 km	MPC · JPL
604459	2015 QQ_{8}	—	December 1, 2011	Haleakala	Pan-STARRS 1	·	1.8 km	MPC · JPL
604460	2015 QA_{10}	—	March 8, 2005	Mount Lemmon	Mount Lemmon Survey	·	1.4 km	MPC · JPL
604461	2015 QP_{12}	—	August 21, 2015	Haleakala	Pan-STARRS 1	·	2.6 km	MPC · JPL
604462	2015 QV_{12}	—	November 17, 2004	Campo Imperatore	CINEOS	EOS	2.0 km	MPC · JPL
604463	2015 QD_{13}	—	February 7, 2007	Mount Lemmon	Mount Lemmon Survey	·	2.2 km	MPC · JPL
604464	2015 QY_{13}	—	October 9, 2010	Mount Lemmon	Mount Lemmon Survey	·	2.2 km	MPC · JPL
604465	2015 QA_{14}	—	August 1, 2009	Kitt Peak	Spacewatch	·	2.1 km	MPC · JPL
604466	2015 QC_{14}	—	November 5, 2010	Kitt Peak	Spacewatch	·	2.5 km	MPC · JPL
604467	2015 QB_{15}	—	October 7, 2010	Mount Lemmon	Mount Lemmon Survey	·	2.8 km	MPC · JPL
604468 Olenici	2015 QL_{15}	Olenici	August 19, 2015	La Palma	EURONEAR	·	1.9 km	MPC · JPL
604469	2015 QE_{16}	—	May 28, 2014	Haleakala	Pan-STARRS 1	·	1.8 km	MPC · JPL
604470	2015 QE_{18}	—	July 1, 2014	Haleakala	Pan-STARRS 1	·	2.3 km	MPC · JPL
604471	2015 QU_{25}	—	August 21, 2015	Haleakala	Pan-STARRS 1	·	2.3 km	MPC · JPL
604472	2015 QM_{26}	—	August 21, 2015	Haleakala	Pan-STARRS 1	·	1.3 km	MPC · JPL
604473	2015 QH_{27}	—	August 21, 2015	Haleakala	Pan-STARRS 1	EOS	1.4 km	MPC · JPL
604474	2015 RE_{1}	—	September 28, 2011	Les Engarouines	L. Bernasconi	·	1.4 km	MPC · JPL
604475	2015 RP_{1}	—	October 19, 2006	Mount Lemmon	Mount Lemmon Survey	GEF	1.3 km	MPC · JPL
604476	2015 RR_{1}	—	October 16, 2010	Mayhill-ISON	L. Elenin	EOS	1.4 km	MPC · JPL
604477	2015 RD_{3}	—	February 28, 2009	Kitt Peak	Spacewatch	·	1.4 km	MPC · JPL
604478	2015 RO_{8}	—	June 17, 2015	Haleakala	Pan-STARRS 1	H	340 m	MPC · JPL
604479	2015 RZ_{8}	—	February 28, 2014	Haleakala	Pan-STARRS 1	·	1.5 km	MPC · JPL
604480	2015 RM_{11}	—	November 3, 2011	Mount Lemmon	Mount Lemmon Survey	·	2.5 km	MPC · JPL
604481	2015 RQ_{13}	—	February 3, 2013	Haleakala	Pan-STARRS 1	·	1.9 km	MPC · JPL
604482	2015 RK_{16}	—	July 23, 2015	Haleakala	Pan-STARRS 1	·	1.4 km	MPC · JPL
604483	2015 RY_{21}	—	July 23, 2015	Haleakala	Pan-STARRS 1	·	1.7 km	MPC · JPL
604484	2015 RD_{24}	—	August 13, 2015	XuYi	PMO NEO Survey Program	·	2.7 km	MPC · JPL
604485	2015 RN_{24}	—	October 5, 2005	Catalina	CSS	EOS	2.1 km	MPC · JPL
604486	2015 RS_{25}	—	January 28, 2007	Mount Lemmon	Mount Lemmon Survey	EOS	1.6 km	MPC · JPL
604487	2015 RM_{28}	—	January 17, 2013	Haleakala	Pan-STARRS 1	EUN	1.2 km	MPC · JPL
604488	2015 RZ_{28}	—	February 18, 2014	Mount Lemmon	Mount Lemmon Survey	H	480 m	MPC · JPL
604489	2015 RP_{33}	—	September 9, 2015	Haleakala	Pan-STARRS 1	MAR	1 km	MPC · JPL
604490	2015 RS_{33}	—	September 9, 2015	Haleakala	Pan-STARRS 1	·	2.8 km	MPC · JPL
604491	2015 RV_{33}	—	January 30, 2011	Mount Lemmon	Mount Lemmon Survey	T_{j} (2.98)	2.7 km	MPC · JPL
604492	2015 RL_{38}	—	November 1, 2010	Mount Lemmon	Mount Lemmon Survey	·	2.3 km	MPC · JPL
604493	2015 RF_{40}	—	September 15, 2004	Kitt Peak	Spacewatch	·	1.9 km	MPC · JPL
604494	2015 RJ_{41}	—	February 12, 2008	Mount Lemmon	Mount Lemmon Survey	·	2.6 km	MPC · JPL
604495	2015 RL_{42}	—	August 27, 2006	Kitt Peak	Spacewatch	·	1.0 km	MPC · JPL
604496	2015 RA_{43}	—	September 15, 1998	Kitt Peak	Spacewatch	VER	2.8 km	MPC · JPL
604497	2015 RT_{48}	—	September 18, 2010	Mount Lemmon	Mount Lemmon Survey	·	1.8 km	MPC · JPL
604498	2015 RC_{51}	—	September 17, 2010	Mount Lemmon	Mount Lemmon Survey	·	2.1 km	MPC · JPL
604499	2015 RU_{51}	—	March 19, 2013	Haleakala	Pan-STARRS 1	EUP	3.0 km	MPC · JPL
604500	2015 RE_{55}	—	September 10, 2015	Haleakala	Pan-STARRS 1	·	1.9 km	MPC · JPL

== 604501–604600 ==
back to top

Designation			Discovery			Properties		Ref
Permanent	Provisional	Named after	Date	Site	Discoverer(s)	Category	Diam.	Ref
604501	2015 RK_{55}	—	April 6, 2013	Mount Lemmon	Mount Lemmon Survey	·	2.4 km	MPC · JPL
604502	2015 RX_{59}	—	November 11, 2010	Mount Lemmon	Mount Lemmon Survey	·	1.8 km	MPC · JPL
604503	2015 RC_{60}	—	October 24, 2011	Kitt Peak	Spacewatch	(5)	980 m	MPC · JPL
604504	2015 RV_{62}	—	May 7, 2014	Haleakala	Pan-STARRS 1	·	2.2 km	MPC · JPL
604505	2015 RE_{64}	—	August 9, 2015	Haleakala	Pan-STARRS 1	MAR	790 m	MPC · JPL
604506	2015 RZ_{64}	—	July 23, 2015	Haleakala	Pan-STARRS 1	·	1.7 km	MPC · JPL
604507	2015 RA_{65}	—	October 7, 2004	Kitt Peak	Spacewatch	·	2.5 km	MPC · JPL
604508	2015 RE_{65}	—	May 7, 2014	Haleakala	Pan-STARRS 1	EOS	1.0 km	MPC · JPL
604509	2015 RX_{65}	—	September 15, 2004	Kitt Peak	Spacewatch	·	2.8 km	MPC · JPL
604510	2015 RQ_{70}	—	September 10, 2015	Haleakala	Pan-STARRS 1	HYG	2.2 km	MPC · JPL
604511	2015 RK_{74}	—	September 9, 2004	Kitt Peak	Spacewatch	·	2.3 km	MPC · JPL
604512	2015 RD_{75}	—	November 1, 2010	Mount Lemmon	Mount Lemmon Survey	·	1.9 km	MPC · JPL
604513	2015 RQ_{79}	—	September 11, 2004	Kitt Peak	Spacewatch	·	2.2 km	MPC · JPL
604514	2015 RF_{85}	—	August 30, 2005	Palomar	NEAT	·	1.8 km	MPC · JPL
604515	2015 RY_{85}	—	June 1, 2003	Kitt Peak	Spacewatch	·	1.2 km	MPC · JPL
604516	2015 RA_{86}	—	June 24, 2015	Haleakala	Pan-STARRS 1	·	3.0 km	MPC · JPL
604517	2015 RH_{86}	—	April 11, 2008	Mount Lemmon	Mount Lemmon Survey	·	2.9 km	MPC · JPL
604518	2015 RZ_{86}	—	November 6, 2010	Mount Lemmon	Mount Lemmon Survey	·	2.5 km	MPC · JPL
604519	2015 RF_{87}	—	September 20, 2015	Catalina	CSS	(194)	1.1 km	MPC · JPL
604520	2015 RL_{88}	—	October 14, 2010	Mount Lemmon	Mount Lemmon Survey	EOS	1.7 km	MPC · JPL
604521	2015 RO_{89}	—	September 8, 2004	Palomar	NEAT	EOS	2.2 km	MPC · JPL
604522	2015 RP_{89}	—	January 1, 2009	Mount Lemmon	Mount Lemmon Survey	EUN	1.4 km	MPC · JPL
604523	2015 RW_{89}	—	July 25, 2015	Haleakala	Pan-STARRS 1	·	2.5 km	MPC · JPL
604524	2015 RG_{91}	—	February 3, 2009	Kitt Peak	Spacewatch	H	490 m	MPC · JPL
604525	2015 RY_{92}	—	August 30, 2011	Haleakala	Pan-STARRS 1	·	1.1 km	MPC · JPL
604526	2015 RW_{98}	—	October 13, 2001	Kitt Peak	Spacewatch	·	1.6 km	MPC · JPL
604527	2015 RO_{99}	—	July 28, 2005	Palomar	NEAT	·	2.0 km	MPC · JPL
604528	2015 RB_{104}	—	January 24, 2007	Mount Lemmon	Mount Lemmon Survey	EOS	1.8 km	MPC · JPL
604529	2015 RF_{105}	—	August 9, 2015	Haleakala	Pan-STARRS 1	H	370 m	MPC · JPL
604530	2015 RY_{105}	—	July 23, 2015	Haleakala	Pan-STARRS 1	·	1.7 km	MPC · JPL
604531	2015 RV_{114}	—	September 9, 2015	Haleakala	Pan-STARRS 1	(1547)	1.1 km	MPC · JPL
604532	2015 RA_{116}	—	May 7, 2014	Haleakala	Pan-STARRS 1	·	2.5 km	MPC · JPL
604533	2015 RK_{121}	—	March 13, 2007	Mount Lemmon	Mount Lemmon Survey	·	3.1 km	MPC · JPL
604534	2015 RP_{135}	—	March 13, 2013	Mount Lemmon	Mount Lemmon Survey	·	1.8 km	MPC · JPL
604535	2015 RC_{137}	—	September 9, 2015	Haleakala	Pan-STARRS 1	·	1.9 km	MPC · JPL
604536	2015 RG_{142}	—	September 10, 2004	Kitt Peak	Spacewatch	·	1.9 km	MPC · JPL
604537	2015 RU_{144}	—	June 22, 2014	Mount Lemmon	Mount Lemmon Survey	EOS	1.4 km	MPC · JPL
604538	2015 RS_{149}	—	December 7, 2005	Kitt Peak	Spacewatch	·	2.3 km	MPC · JPL
604539	2015 RO_{153}	—	September 19, 2010	Mount Lemmon	Mount Lemmon Survey	·	2.2 km	MPC · JPL
604540	2015 RT_{153}	—	February 28, 2008	Kitt Peak	Spacewatch	·	1.7 km	MPC · JPL
604541	2015 RC_{154}	—	September 11, 2004	Kitt Peak	Spacewatch	·	2.6 km	MPC · JPL
604542	2015 RD_{163}	—	October 28, 2010	Mount Lemmon	Mount Lemmon Survey	·	1.9 km	MPC · JPL
604543	2015 RT_{163}	—	September 19, 2010	Kitt Peak	Spacewatch	EOS	1.4 km	MPC · JPL
604544	2015 RZ_{168}	—	October 17, 2010	Mount Lemmon	Mount Lemmon Survey	EMA	2.2 km	MPC · JPL
604545	2015 RP_{170}	—	September 4, 2010	Kitt Peak	Spacewatch	TEL	880 m	MPC · JPL
604546	2015 RR_{171}	—	August 21, 2015	Haleakala	Pan-STARRS 1	EOS	1.4 km	MPC · JPL
604547	2015 RW_{172}	—	March 15, 2007	Mount Lemmon	Mount Lemmon Survey	V	440 m	MPC · JPL
604548	2015 RK_{173}	—	October 24, 2011	Haleakala	Pan-STARRS 1	·	980 m	MPC · JPL
604549	2015 RG_{176}	—	March 26, 2007	Mount Lemmon	Mount Lemmon Survey	·	2.0 km	MPC · JPL
604550	2015 RL_{176}	—	March 18, 2013	Mount Lemmon	Mount Lemmon Survey	·	2.3 km	MPC · JPL
604551	2015 RO_{177}	—	May 5, 2002	Kitt Peak	Spacewatch	·	2.0 km	MPC · JPL
604552	2015 RJ_{178}	—	September 9, 2015	Haleakala	Pan-STARRS 1	·	2.2 km	MPC · JPL
604553	2015 RO_{181}	—	September 17, 2010	Mount Lemmon	Mount Lemmon Survey	EOS	1.5 km	MPC · JPL
604554	2015 RX_{181}	—	September 4, 2015	Kitt Peak	Spacewatch	·	1.9 km	MPC · JPL
604555	2015 RQ_{189}	—	October 15, 2007	Kitt Peak	Spacewatch	·	940 m	MPC · JPL
604556	2015 RY_{190}	—	October 9, 2010	Mount Lemmon	Mount Lemmon Survey	·	2.1 km	MPC · JPL
604557	2015 RO_{191}	—	November 13, 2010	Mount Lemmon	Mount Lemmon Survey	·	2.3 km	MPC · JPL
604558	2015 RR_{194}	—	September 11, 2015	Haleakala	Pan-STARRS 1	·	1.1 km	MPC · JPL
604559	2015 RT_{194}	—	December 13, 2010	Mount Lemmon	Mount Lemmon Survey	THM	1.9 km	MPC · JPL
604560	2015 RJ_{196}	—	November 12, 2010	Mount Lemmon	Mount Lemmon Survey	·	2.1 km	MPC · JPL
604561	2015 RQ_{197}	—	September 11, 2015	Haleakala	Pan-STARRS 1	·	2.0 km	MPC · JPL
604562	2015 RF_{198}	—	September 11, 2015	Haleakala	Pan-STARRS 1	·	2.1 km	MPC · JPL
604563	2015 RL_{202}	—	March 16, 2007	Kitt Peak	Spacewatch	·	2.7 km	MPC · JPL
604564	2015 RS_{202}	—	August 12, 2015	Haleakala	Pan-STARRS 1	·	1.5 km	MPC · JPL
604565	2015 RP_{203}	—	February 9, 2013	Haleakala	Pan-STARRS 1	·	1.5 km	MPC · JPL
604566	2015 RN_{204}	—	April 5, 2014	Haleakala	Pan-STARRS 1	·	1.6 km	MPC · JPL
604567	2015 RX_{206}	—	September 11, 2015	Haleakala	Pan-STARRS 1	·	1.6 km	MPC · JPL
604568	2015 RN_{207}	—	April 9, 2003	Palomar	NEAT	·	2.5 km	MPC · JPL
604569	2015 RQ_{210}	—	February 21, 2007	Kitt Peak	Spacewatch	·	2.8 km	MPC · JPL
604570	2015 RK_{213}	—	September 17, 2010	Kitt Peak	Spacewatch	·	1.3 km	MPC · JPL
604571	2015 RK_{216}	—	September 11, 2015	Haleakala	Pan-STARRS 1	·	2.6 km	MPC · JPL
604572	2015 RT_{216}	—	September 17, 2009	Mount Lemmon	Mount Lemmon Survey	·	2.5 km	MPC · JPL
604573	2015 RY_{216}	—	March 14, 2007	Mount Lemmon	Mount Lemmon Survey	·	3.1 km	MPC · JPL
604574	2015 RG_{218}	—	September 17, 2010	Mount Lemmon	Mount Lemmon Survey	KOR	1.1 km	MPC · JPL
604575	2015 RV_{222}	—	September 11, 2015	Haleakala	Pan-STARRS 1	·	1.8 km	MPC · JPL
604576	2015 RX_{223}	—	September 11, 2015	Haleakala	Pan-STARRS 1	VER	1.9 km	MPC · JPL
604577	2015 RL_{227}	—	September 25, 1998	Apache Point	SDSS Collaboration	·	2.0 km	MPC · JPL
604578	2015 RR_{227}	—	February 27, 2008	Mount Lemmon	Mount Lemmon Survey	·	1.8 km	MPC · JPL
604579	2015 RX_{230}	—	September 19, 1998	Apache Point	SDSS Collaboration	VER	1.7 km	MPC · JPL
604580	2015 RE_{231}	—	January 22, 2012	Haleakala	Pan-STARRS 1	·	2.4 km	MPC · JPL
604581	2015 RK_{231}	—	August 12, 2015	Haleakala	Pan-STARRS 1	ARM	2.3 km	MPC · JPL
604582	2015 RZ_{233}	—	August 27, 2009	Kitt Peak	Spacewatch	·	2.2 km	MPC · JPL
604583	2015 RB_{234}	—	September 11, 2015	Haleakala	Pan-STARRS 1	·	2.3 km	MPC · JPL
604584	2015 RP_{235}	—	July 25, 2014	Haleakala	Pan-STARRS 1	·	1.7 km	MPC · JPL
604585	2015 RP_{237}	—	September 11, 2015	Haleakala	Pan-STARRS 1	·	1.8 km	MPC · JPL
604586	2015 RW_{241}	—	September 11, 2015	Haleakala	Pan-STARRS 1	·	2.1 km	MPC · JPL
604587	2015 RT_{247}	—	February 15, 2013	Haleakala	Pan-STARRS 1	EMA	2.2 km	MPC · JPL
604588	2015 RD_{248}	—	August 17, 2009	Kitt Peak	Spacewatch	·	2.1 km	MPC · JPL
604589	2015 RB_{255}	—	March 16, 2007	Mount Lemmon	Mount Lemmon Survey	·	2.0 km	MPC · JPL
604590	2015 RE_{255}	—	September 11, 2015	Haleakala	Pan-STARRS 1	PAD	1.3 km	MPC · JPL
604591	2015 RQ_{258}	—	August 29, 2009	Kitt Peak	Spacewatch	VER	2.5 km	MPC · JPL
604592	2015 RU_{259}	—	September 12, 2015	Haleakala	Pan-STARRS 1	·	2.6 km	MPC · JPL
604593	2015 RY_{268}	—	September 9, 2015	Haleakala	Pan-STARRS 1	·	950 m	MPC · JPL
604594	2015 RX_{270}	—	October 2, 2010	Kitt Peak	Spacewatch	·	2.3 km	MPC · JPL
604595	2015 RT_{271}	—	May 28, 2014	Haleakala	Pan-STARRS 1	THM	1.3 km	MPC · JPL
604596	2015 RF_{292}	—	September 8, 2015	Haleakala	Pan-STARRS 1	·	940 m	MPC · JPL
604597	2015 RB_{296}	—	September 10, 2015	Haleakala	Pan-STARRS 1	·	2.0 km	MPC · JPL
604598	2015 RR_{300}	—	September 11, 2015	Haleakala	Pan-STARRS 1	·	2.1 km	MPC · JPL
604599	2015 RK_{302}	—	September 10, 2015	Haleakala	Pan-STARRS 1	·	1.3 km	MPC · JPL
604600	2015 RT_{303}	—	September 9, 2015	Haleakala	Pan-STARRS 1	·	2.3 km	MPC · JPL

== 604601–604700 ==
back to top

Designation			Discovery			Properties		Ref
Permanent	Provisional	Named after	Date	Site	Discoverer(s)	Category	Diam.	Ref
604601	2015 RZ_{303}	—	September 10, 2015	Haleakala	Pan-STARRS 1	·	2.2 km	MPC · JPL
604602	2015 RP_{307}	—	September 8, 2015	Haleakala	Pan-STARRS 1	·	1.5 km	MPC · JPL
604603	2015 RD_{318}	—	September 6, 2015	Haleakala	Pan-STARRS 1	EOS	1.4 km	MPC · JPL
604604	2015 RT_{324}	—	September 12, 2015	Haleakala	Pan-STARRS 1	HOF	1.8 km	MPC · JPL
604605	2015 RL_{331}	—	September 9, 2015	Haleakala	Pan-STARRS 1	·	1.5 km	MPC · JPL
604606	2015 RS_{336}	—	September 9, 2015	Haleakala	Pan-STARRS 1	·	1.8 km	MPC · JPL
604607	2015 SF_{3}	—	May 9, 2013	Haleakala	Pan-STARRS 1	·	2.4 km	MPC · JPL
604608	2015 ST_{4}	—	October 3, 2015	Mount Lemmon	Mount Lemmon Survey	·	2.1 km	MPC · JPL
604609	2015 SZ_{4}	—	February 27, 2012	La Palma	La Palma	·	2.0 km	MPC · JPL
604610	2015 SY_{5}	—	March 8, 2013	Haleakala	Pan-STARRS 1	·	2.8 km	MPC · JPL
604611	2015 SO_{6}	—	January 10, 2014	Catalina	CSS	H	490 m	MPC · JPL
604612	2015 SA_{7}	—	December 9, 2010	Mount Lemmon	Mount Lemmon Survey	H	490 m	MPC · JPL
604613	2015 SP_{8}	—	May 7, 2014	Haleakala	Pan-STARRS 1	·	3.5 km	MPC · JPL
604614	2015 SD_{12}	—	July 23, 2015	Haleakala	Pan-STARRS 1	·	2.4 km	MPC · JPL
604615	2015 SR_{12}	—	March 10, 2008	Mount Lemmon	Mount Lemmon Survey	·	1.8 km	MPC · JPL
604616	2015 ST_{12}	—	October 3, 2010	Kitt Peak	Spacewatch	·	2.0 km	MPC · JPL
604617	2015 SD_{13}	—	November 2, 2010	Mount Lemmon	Mount Lemmon Survey	·	2.3 km	MPC · JPL
604618	2015 SP_{13}	—	January 4, 2012	Mount Lemmon	Mount Lemmon Survey	·	2.4 km	MPC · JPL
604619	2015 SX_{13}	—	September 3, 2010	Mount Lemmon	Mount Lemmon Survey	·	3.2 km	MPC · JPL
604620	2015 SG_{16}	—	December 5, 2010	Kitt Peak	Spacewatch	·	3.0 km	MPC · JPL
604621	2015 ST_{16}	—	September 24, 2015	Mount Lemmon	Mount Lemmon Survey	·	2.1 km	MPC · JPL
604622	2015 ST_{17}	—	February 12, 2008	Mount Lemmon	Mount Lemmon Survey	JUN	930 m	MPC · JPL
604623	2015 SN_{18}	—	June 26, 2015	Haleakala	Pan-STARRS 1	·	2.8 km	MPC · JPL
604624	2015 SF_{19}	—	February 1, 2006	Mount Lemmon	Mount Lemmon Survey	·	3.7 km	MPC · JPL
604625	2015 SV_{23}	—	August 28, 2009	La Sagra	OAM	·	2.6 km	MPC · JPL
604626	2015 SX_{24}	—	January 30, 2011	Mount Lemmon	Mount Lemmon Survey	·	2.3 km	MPC · JPL
604627	2015 SZ_{26}	—	February 15, 2012	Haleakala	Pan-STARRS 1	·	2.1 km	MPC · JPL
604628	2015 ST_{27}	—	October 18, 2011	Mount Lemmon	Mount Lemmon Survey	EUN	950 m	MPC · JPL
604629	2015 SV_{28}	—	September 23, 2015	Haleakala	Pan-STARRS 1	·	2.3 km	MPC · JPL
604630	2015 SN_{29}	—	August 23, 2014	Haleakala	Pan-STARRS 1	·	3.0 km	MPC · JPL
604631	2015 SD_{48}	—	September 23, 2015	Mount Lemmon	Mount Lemmon Survey	·	2.0 km	MPC · JPL
604632	2015 TX	—	August 26, 2002	Palomar	NEAT	H	340 m	MPC · JPL
604633	2015 TY_{2}	—	October 1, 2015	Mount Lemmon	Mount Lemmon Survey	TIR	1.8 km	MPC · JPL
604634	2015 TD_{3}	—	July 25, 2015	Haleakala	Pan-STARRS 1	·	1.5 km	MPC · JPL
604635	2015 TP_{4}	—	October 18, 2007	Kitt Peak	Spacewatch	·	1.5 km	MPC · JPL
604636	2015 TW_{6}	—	September 14, 2007	Catalina	CSS	·	840 m	MPC · JPL
604637	2015 TC_{7}	—	August 29, 2006	Catalina	CSS	·	2.2 km	MPC · JPL
604638	2015 TZ_{7}	—	August 14, 2015	Haleakala	Pan-STARRS 1	·	1.3 km	MPC · JPL
604639	2015 TD_{10}	—	September 12, 2015	Haleakala	Pan-STARRS 1	·	2.4 km	MPC · JPL
604640	2015 TX_{11}	—	July 28, 2015	Haleakala	Pan-STARRS 1	·	1.4 km	MPC · JPL
604641	2015 TA_{14}	—	July 25, 2015	Haleakala	Pan-STARRS 1	EOS	1.7 km	MPC · JPL
604642	2015 TX_{15}	—	October 2, 2015	Haleakala	Pan-STARRS 1	·	2.3 km	MPC · JPL
604643	2015 TQ_{16}	—	December 3, 2010	Mount Lemmon	Mount Lemmon Survey	·	3.0 km	MPC · JPL
604644	2015 TY_{17}	—	November 7, 2010	Catalina	CSS	·	3.1 km	MPC · JPL
604645	2015 TE_{19}	—	October 9, 2010	Mount Lemmon	Mount Lemmon Survey	·	3.2 km	MPC · JPL
604646	2015 TS_{19}	—	November 13, 2010	Mount Lemmon	Mount Lemmon Survey	EOS	1.5 km	MPC · JPL
604647	2015 TX_{21}	—	September 2, 2010	La Sagra	OAM	·	2.1 km	MPC · JPL
604648	2015 TY_{22}	—	October 6, 2015	Oukaïmeden	C. Rinner	·	2.9 km	MPC · JPL
604649	2015 TH_{23}	—	October 9, 1999	Catalina	CSS	·	2.3 km	MPC · JPL
604650	2015 TN_{27}	—	September 24, 2011	Haleakala	Pan-STARRS 1	·	1.7 km	MPC · JPL
604651	2015 TQ_{28}	—	April 28, 2003	Kitt Peak	Spacewatch	·	2.4 km	MPC · JPL
604652	2015 TO_{29}	—	March 31, 2014	Kitt Peak	Spacewatch	·	1.6 km	MPC · JPL
604653	2015 TV_{30}	—	April 24, 2003	Campo Imperatore	CINEOS	·	2.7 km	MPC · JPL
604654	2015 TW_{30}	—	May 28, 2014	Mount Lemmon	Mount Lemmon Survey	EOS	1.4 km	MPC · JPL
604655	2015 TD_{31}	—	May 21, 2014	Haleakala	Pan-STARRS 1	EOS	1.4 km	MPC · JPL
604656	2015 TF_{34}	—	January 10, 2013	Haleakala	Pan-STARRS 1	·	1.6 km	MPC · JPL
604657	2015 TU_{34}	—	June 24, 2014	Mount Lemmon	Mount Lemmon Survey	·	2.1 km	MPC · JPL
604658	2015 TB_{35}	—	October 5, 2015	Haleakala	Pan-STARRS 1	·	1.3 km	MPC · JPL
604659	2015 TL_{35}	—	March 14, 2007	Mount Lemmon	Mount Lemmon Survey	·	2.8 km	MPC · JPL
604660	2015 TR_{35}	—	December 29, 2011	Mount Lemmon	Mount Lemmon Survey	·	1.9 km	MPC · JPL
604661	2015 TZ_{35}	—	May 7, 2014	Haleakala	Pan-STARRS 1	·	1.2 km	MPC · JPL
604662	2015 TU_{36}	—	April 22, 2014	Kitt Peak	Spacewatch	·	2.1 km	MPC · JPL
604663	2015 TF_{37}	—	March 10, 2008	Mount Lemmon	Mount Lemmon Survey	·	2.3 km	MPC · JPL
604664	2015 TR_{39}	—	October 8, 2015	Haleakala	Pan-STARRS 1	·	2.2 km	MPC · JPL
604665	2015 TX_{39}	—	October 2, 2006	Mount Lemmon	Mount Lemmon Survey	TIN	740 m	MPC · JPL
604666	2015 TB_{40}	—	May 30, 2015	Haleakala	Pan-STARRS 1	·	1.6 km	MPC · JPL
604667	2015 TN_{40}	—	October 6, 2008	Mount Lemmon	Mount Lemmon Survey	·	1.0 km	MPC · JPL
604668	2015 TE_{42}	—	October 17, 2010	Mount Lemmon	Mount Lemmon Survey	·	2.8 km	MPC · JPL
604669	2015 TP_{45}	—	May 8, 2014	Haleakala	Pan-STARRS 1	·	960 m	MPC · JPL
604670	2015 TS_{45}	—	April 7, 2007	Mount Lemmon	Mount Lemmon Survey	·	2.3 km	MPC · JPL
604671	2015 TW_{45}	—	January 30, 2012	Mount Lemmon	Mount Lemmon Survey	·	2.2 km	MPC · JPL
604672	2015 TG_{46}	—	May 21, 2014	Haleakala	Pan-STARRS 1	WIT	730 m	MPC · JPL
604673	2015 TY_{50}	—	January 17, 2013	Mount Lemmon	Mount Lemmon Survey	·	1.4 km	MPC · JPL
604674	2015 TA_{54}	—	September 5, 2010	Mount Lemmon	Mount Lemmon Survey	·	2.1 km	MPC · JPL
604675	2015 TH_{54}	—	January 26, 2012	Haleakala	Pan-STARRS 1	VER	2.2 km	MPC · JPL
604676	2015 TR_{55}	—	January 8, 2010	Mount Lemmon	Mount Lemmon Survey	·	550 m	MPC · JPL
604677	2015 TA_{57}	—	September 18, 2010	Mount Lemmon	Mount Lemmon Survey	·	2.1 km	MPC · JPL
604678	2015 TB_{58}	—	November 2, 2010	Mount Lemmon	Mount Lemmon Survey	·	2.1 km	MPC · JPL
604679	2015 TG_{58}	—	September 7, 2004	Kitt Peak	Spacewatch	·	3.0 km	MPC · JPL
604680	2015 TP_{65}	—	October 8, 2015	Haleakala	Pan-STARRS 1	·	2.5 km	MPC · JPL
604681	2015 TL_{73}	—	June 24, 2014	Haleakala	Pan-STARRS 1	·	1.3 km	MPC · JPL
604682	2015 TE_{74}	—	November 17, 2006	Mount Lemmon	Mount Lemmon Survey	·	2.3 km	MPC · JPL
604683	2015 TA_{77}	—	November 4, 2004	Kitt Peak	Spacewatch	·	3.4 km	MPC · JPL
604684	2015 TQ_{85}	—	March 19, 2007	Mount Lemmon	Mount Lemmon Survey	·	3.1 km	MPC · JPL
604685	2015 TE_{93}	—	October 8, 2015	Haleakala	Pan-STARRS 1	·	1.9 km	MPC · JPL
604686	2015 TJ_{99}	—	September 9, 2015	Haleakala	Pan-STARRS 1	·	1.3 km	MPC · JPL
604687	2015 TO_{99}	—	April 22, 2007	Mount Lemmon	Mount Lemmon Survey	·	1.5 km	MPC · JPL
604688	2015 TJ_{100}	—	October 8, 2015	Mount Lemmon	Mount Lemmon Survey	·	2.8 km	MPC · JPL
604689	2015 TM_{108}	—	October 8, 2015	Haleakala	Pan-STARRS 1	T_{j} (2.95)	2.8 km	MPC · JPL
604690	2015 TN_{125}	—	October 8, 2015	Haleakala	Pan-STARRS 1	·	3.0 km	MPC · JPL
604691	2015 TT_{126}	—	October 8, 2015	Haleakala	Pan-STARRS 1	·	2.2 km	MPC · JPL
604692	2015 TC_{128}	—	September 11, 2015	Haleakala	Pan-STARRS 1	·	2.6 km	MPC · JPL
604693	2015 TS_{128}	—	October 16, 2009	Mount Lemmon	Mount Lemmon Survey	·	2.4 km	MPC · JPL
604694	2015 TH_{129}	—	September 30, 2003	Kitt Peak	Spacewatch	·	2.3 km	MPC · JPL
604695	2015 TH_{136}	—	September 12, 2015	Haleakala	Pan-STARRS 1	BRA	950 m	MPC · JPL
604696	2015 TQ_{138}	—	December 18, 2007	Mount Lemmon	Mount Lemmon Survey	·	930 m	MPC · JPL
604697	2015 TP_{151}	—	May 23, 2014	Haleakala	Pan-STARRS 1	·	1.6 km	MPC · JPL
604698	2015 TG_{152}	—	January 18, 2012	Mount Lemmon	Mount Lemmon Survey	·	2.1 km	MPC · JPL
604699	2015 TZ_{156}	—	September 11, 2015	Haleakala	Pan-STARRS 1	·	2.4 km	MPC · JPL
604700	2015 TW_{163}	—	August 30, 2011	Haleakala	Pan-STARRS 1	·	1.2 km	MPC · JPL

== 604701–604800 ==
back to top

Designation			Discovery			Properties		Ref
Permanent	Provisional	Named after	Date	Site	Discoverer(s)	Category	Diam.	Ref
604701	2015 TV_{164}	—	June 29, 2015	Haleakala	Pan-STARRS 1	BRA	1.0 km	MPC · JPL
604702	2015 TR_{165}	—	October 9, 2015	Kitt Peak	Spacewatch	·	2.4 km	MPC · JPL
604703	2015 TW_{165}	—	September 13, 2006	Palomar	NEAT	·	1.4 km	MPC · JPL
604704	2015 TQ_{166}	—	September 9, 2015	Haleakala	Pan-STARRS 1	·	2.8 km	MPC · JPL
604705	2015 TJ_{168}	—	October 9, 2010	Kitt Peak	Spacewatch	EOS	1.4 km	MPC · JPL
604706	2015 TJ_{179}	—	May 4, 2014	Haleakala	Pan-STARRS 1	·	1.6 km	MPC · JPL
604707	2015 TL_{179}	—	August 12, 2015	Haleakala	Pan-STARRS 1	·	2.1 km	MPC · JPL
604708	2015 TB_{185}	—	October 9, 2015	Haleakala	Pan-STARRS 1	·	1.9 km	MPC · JPL
604709	2015 TU_{188}	—	June 25, 2015	Haleakala	Pan-STARRS 1	·	2.0 km	MPC · JPL
604710	2015 TX_{189}	—	September 28, 2006	Catalina	CSS	·	1.7 km	MPC · JPL
604711	2015 TF_{190}	—	November 6, 2010	Catalina	CSS	·	2.2 km	MPC · JPL
604712	2015 TH_{190}	—	September 11, 2010	Mount Lemmon	Mount Lemmon Survey	·	1.8 km	MPC · JPL
604713	2015 TQ_{190}	—	November 4, 2004	Catalina	CSS	·	3.4 km	MPC · JPL
604714	2015 TO_{191}	—	May 31, 2009	Cerro Burek	Burek, Cerro	·	2.2 km	MPC · JPL
604715	2015 TF_{192}	—	September 28, 2005	Palomar	NEAT	·	2.8 km	MPC · JPL
604716	2015 TZ_{193}	—	May 2, 2014	Mount Lemmon	Mount Lemmon Survey	TIN	840 m	MPC · JPL
604717	2015 TH_{195}	—	November 8, 2010	Kitt Peak	Spacewatch	·	2.6 km	MPC · JPL
604718	2015 TV_{195}	—	October 10, 2002	Palomar	NEAT	H	520 m	MPC · JPL
604719	2015 TZ_{199}	—	October 19, 2009	Mount Lemmon	Mount Lemmon Survey	·	2.7 km	MPC · JPL
604720	2015 TG_{202}	—	April 19, 2007	Mount Lemmon	Mount Lemmon Survey	·	730 m	MPC · JPL
604721	2015 TX_{202}	—	December 2, 2004	Catalina	CSS	·	3.1 km	MPC · JPL
604722	2015 TR_{205}	—	September 14, 2010	Mount Lemmon	Mount Lemmon Survey	EOS	2.0 km	MPC · JPL
604723	2015 TT_{206}	—	April 17, 2013	Cerro Tololo-DECam	DECam	VER	2.1 km	MPC · JPL
604724	2015 TM_{207}	—	September 23, 2004	Kitt Peak	Spacewatch	·	2.4 km	MPC · JPL
604725	2015 TN_{207}	—	September 11, 2006	Catalina	CSS	EUN	1.3 km	MPC · JPL
604726	2015 TH_{210}	—	August 23, 2004	Kitt Peak	Spacewatch	·	870 m	MPC · JPL
604727	2015 TL_{211}	—	September 17, 2006	Kitt Peak	Spacewatch	·	1.5 km	MPC · JPL
604728	2015 TU_{214}	—	December 24, 2005	Kitt Peak	Spacewatch	·	2.4 km	MPC · JPL
604729	2015 TN_{215}	—	April 7, 2013	Mount Lemmon	Mount Lemmon Survey	·	2.1 km	MPC · JPL
604730	2015 TR_{216}	—	September 18, 2015	Mount Lemmon	Mount Lemmon Survey	THM	2.0 km	MPC · JPL
604731	2015 TN_{217}	—	April 6, 2013	Mount Lemmon	Mount Lemmon Survey	·	2.4 km	MPC · JPL
604732	2015 TE_{219}	—	September 11, 2015	Haleakala	Pan-STARRS 1	EMA	2.3 km	MPC · JPL
604733	2015 TA_{220}	—	August 25, 2001	Kitt Peak	Spacewatch	·	1.8 km	MPC · JPL
604734	2015 TY_{223}	—	February 16, 2007	Mount Lemmon	Mount Lemmon Survey	·	3.3 km	MPC · JPL
604735	2015 TM_{227}	—	April 25, 2007	Mount Lemmon	Mount Lemmon Survey	·	3.2 km	MPC · JPL
604736	2015 TL_{231}	—	October 10, 2015	Haleakala	Pan-STARRS 1	·	2.5 km	MPC · JPL
604737	2015 TZ_{231}	—	July 1, 2014	Mount Lemmon	Mount Lemmon Survey	·	1.3 km	MPC · JPL
604738	2015 TU_{233}	—	December 2, 2010	Mount Lemmon	Mount Lemmon Survey	·	3.5 km	MPC · JPL
604739	2015 TA_{234}	—	February 24, 2012	Kitt Peak	Spacewatch	·	2.9 km	MPC · JPL
604740	2015 TK_{234}	—	July 7, 2003	Kitt Peak	Spacewatch	URS	3.8 km	MPC · JPL
604741	2015 TH_{237}	—	October 13, 2004	Socorro	LINEAR	T_{j} (2.92)	2.0 km	MPC · JPL
604742	2015 TW_{239}	—	February 23, 2014	Haleakala	Pan-STARRS 1	H	370 m	MPC · JPL
604743	2015 TD_{241}	—	September 7, 2004	Palomar	NEAT	·	2.4 km	MPC · JPL
604744	2015 TK_{241}	—	February 17, 2013	Mount Lemmon	Mount Lemmon Survey	·	3.0 km	MPC · JPL
604745	2015 TE_{249}	—	September 8, 2015	XuYi	PMO NEO Survey Program	·	2.3 km	MPC · JPL
604746	2015 TA_{250}	—	April 19, 2002	Kitt Peak	Spacewatch	EOS	2.1 km	MPC · JPL
604747	2015 TQ_{254}	—	November 14, 2010	Mount Lemmon	Mount Lemmon Survey	·	1.9 km	MPC · JPL
604748	2015 TS_{256}	—	August 25, 2003	Cerro Tololo	Deep Ecliptic Survey	·	2.8 km	MPC · JPL
604749	2015 TL_{258}	—	August 27, 2009	Catalina	CSS	LIX	3.9 km	MPC · JPL
604750 Mārisābele	2015 TO_{260}	Mārisābele	October 6, 2015	Baldone	K. Černis, I. Eglītis	EOS	1.8 km	MPC · JPL
604751	2015 TN_{262}	—	October 11, 2010	Mount Lemmon	Mount Lemmon Survey	·	2.6 km	MPC · JPL
604752	2015 TU_{262}	—	November 26, 2010	Mount Lemmon	Mount Lemmon Survey	·	2.8 km	MPC · JPL
604753	2015 TU_{264}	—	October 17, 2010	Mount Lemmon	Mount Lemmon Survey	·	1.9 km	MPC · JPL
604754	2015 TG_{267}	—	November 27, 2010	Mount Lemmon	Mount Lemmon Survey	·	2.7 km	MPC · JPL
604755	2015 TS_{267}	—	February 21, 2007	Mount Lemmon	Mount Lemmon Survey	·	2.5 km	MPC · JPL
604756	2015 TT_{270}	—	November 10, 2010	Mount Lemmon	Mount Lemmon Survey	·	2.5 km	MPC · JPL
604757	2015 TP_{273}	—	March 17, 2013	Mount Lemmon	Mount Lemmon Survey	EOS	1.5 km	MPC · JPL
604758	2015 TH_{274}	—	July 1, 2014	Haleakala	Pan-STARRS 1	VER	2.5 km	MPC · JPL
604759	2015 TE_{275}	—	April 4, 2014	Haleakala	Pan-STARRS 1	·	1.3 km	MPC · JPL
604760	2015 TJ_{276}	—	December 2, 2010	Mount Lemmon	Mount Lemmon Survey	EOS	1.3 km	MPC · JPL
604761	2015 TG_{278}	—	September 12, 2015	Haleakala	Pan-STARRS 1	·	2.3 km	MPC · JPL
604762	2015 TM_{280}	—	October 4, 2004	Kitt Peak	Spacewatch	·	2.7 km	MPC · JPL
604763	2015 TM_{282}	—	February 20, 2006	Kitt Peak	Spacewatch	·	2.4 km	MPC · JPL
604764	2015 TA_{284}	—	April 15, 2008	Mount Lemmon	Mount Lemmon Survey	·	2.6 km	MPC · JPL
604765	2015 TC_{285}	—	May 4, 2014	Mount Lemmon	Mount Lemmon Survey	·	1.7 km	MPC · JPL
604766	2015 TX_{285}	—	September 11, 2010	Mount Lemmon	Mount Lemmon Survey	·	2.0 km	MPC · JPL
604767	2015 TB_{287}	—	September 11, 2004	Socorro	LINEAR	·	2.5 km	MPC · JPL
604768	2015 TQ_{287}	—	November 8, 2010	Mount Lemmon	Mount Lemmon Survey	·	1.8 km	MPC · JPL
604769	2015 TP_{288}	—	October 12, 2015	Space Surveillance	Space Surveillance Telescope	·	2.0 km	MPC · JPL
604770	2015 TB_{289}	—	April 6, 2008	Kitt Peak	Spacewatch	EOS	1.6 km	MPC · JPL
604771	2015 TT_{291}	—	January 25, 2012	Haleakala	Pan-STARRS 1	·	2.3 km	MPC · JPL
604772 Paraschiv	2015 TS_{293}	Paraschiv	February 26, 2012	La Palma	EURONEAR	THM	1.8 km	MPC · JPL
604773 Michaelmöller	2015 TW_{294}	Michaelmöller	September 6, 2015	SATINO Remote	J. Jahn	·	2.9 km	MPC · JPL
604774	2015 TN_{295}	—	March 13, 2007	Mount Lemmon	Mount Lemmon Survey	·	2.9 km	MPC · JPL
604775	2015 TF_{297}	—	May 24, 2014	Haleakala	Pan-STARRS 1	LIX	2.8 km	MPC · JPL
604776	2015 TE_{298}	—	October 12, 2010	Kitt Peak	Spacewatch	·	2.6 km	MPC · JPL
604777	2015 TG_{298}	—	January 13, 2008	Kitt Peak	Spacewatch	(18466)	2.8 km	MPC · JPL
604778	2015 TE_{303}	—	September 19, 2009	Catalina	CSS	·	3.4 km	MPC · JPL
604779	2015 TO_{304}	—	October 12, 2015	Haleakala	Pan-STARRS 1	·	1.8 km	MPC · JPL
604780	2015 TP_{304}	—	January 30, 2006	Kitt Peak	Spacewatch	EOS	1.8 km	MPC · JPL
604781	2015 TV_{304}	—	January 9, 2006	Kitt Peak	Spacewatch	EOS	1.6 km	MPC · JPL
604782	2015 TW_{306}	—	December 5, 2010	Kitt Peak	Spacewatch	·	2.4 km	MPC · JPL
604783	2015 TD_{307}	—	May 3, 2014	Kitt Peak	Spacewatch	·	1.5 km	MPC · JPL
604784	2015 TC_{309}	—	October 12, 2015	Haleakala	Pan-STARRS 1	EUP	2.4 km	MPC · JPL
604785	2015 TQ_{310}	—	November 5, 2010	Mount Lemmon	Mount Lemmon Survey	·	3.3 km	MPC · JPL
604786	2015 TQ_{312}	—	October 9, 2004	Kitt Peak	Spacewatch	THM	1.6 km	MPC · JPL
604787	2015 TO_{313}	—	September 14, 2002	Anderson Mesa	LONEOS	·	1.6 km	MPC · JPL
604788	2015 TR_{315}	—	September 17, 2006	Kitt Peak	Spacewatch	·	1.2 km	MPC · JPL
604789	2015 TB_{316}	—	September 12, 2015	Haleakala	Pan-STARRS 1	·	1.9 km	MPC · JPL
604790	2015 TN_{316}	—	September 15, 2009	Kitt Peak	Spacewatch	HYG	2.3 km	MPC · JPL
604791	2015 TF_{318}	—	September 8, 2015	XuYi	PMO NEO Survey Program	·	3.4 km	MPC · JPL
604792	2015 TJ_{318}	—	August 15, 2009	Catalina	CSS	LUT	4.4 km	MPC · JPL
604793	2015 TO_{318}	—	September 17, 2009	Catalina	CSS	·	3.1 km	MPC · JPL
604794	2015 TY_{320}	—	December 10, 2004	Socorro	LINEAR	·	2.9 km	MPC · JPL
604795	2015 TG_{322}	—	February 14, 2012	Haleakala	Pan-STARRS 1	·	2.1 km	MPC · JPL
604796	2015 TO_{327}	—	April 28, 2008	Kitt Peak	Spacewatch	·	2.2 km	MPC · JPL
604797	2015 TO_{328}	—	January 26, 2012	Mount Lemmon	Mount Lemmon Survey	·	2.4 km	MPC · JPL
604798	2015 TM_{333}	—	June 26, 2014	Haleakala	Pan-STARRS 1	·	3.2 km	MPC · JPL
604799	2015 TX_{335}	—	September 29, 2010	Mount Lemmon	Mount Lemmon Survey	KOR	1.0 km	MPC · JPL
604800	2015 TG_{337}	—	November 13, 2010	Mount Lemmon	Mount Lemmon Survey	·	2.5 km	MPC · JPL

== 604801–604900 ==
back to top

Designation			Discovery			Properties		Ref
Permanent	Provisional	Named after	Date	Site	Discoverer(s)	Category	Diam.	Ref
604801	2015 TU_{338}	—	October 15, 2015	Haleakala	Pan-STARRS 1	·	2.1 km	MPC · JPL
604802	2015 TK_{342}	—	December 29, 2011	Kitt Peak	Spacewatch	·	2.4 km	MPC · JPL
604803	2015 TN_{347}	—	October 12, 2015	Haleakala	Pan-STARRS 1	·	2.1 km	MPC · JPL
604804	2015 TV_{347}	—	July 25, 2014	Haleakala	Pan-STARRS 1	·	2.4 km	MPC · JPL
604805	2015 TR_{349}	—	March 19, 2001	Apache Point	SDSS Collaboration	·	2.7 km	MPC · JPL
604806	2015 TQ_{351}	—	March 9, 2003	Palomar	NEAT	H	540 m	MPC · JPL
604807	2015 TM_{356}	—	September 19, 2009	Kitt Peak	Spacewatch	·	2.2 km	MPC · JPL
604808	2015 TS_{358}	—	October 10, 2015	Haleakala	Pan-STARRS 1	·	1.3 km	MPC · JPL
604809	2015 TG_{366}	—	May 15, 2008	Mount Lemmon	Mount Lemmon Survey	·	3.0 km	MPC · JPL
604810	2015 TB_{369}	—	July 25, 2014	Haleakala	Pan-STARRS 1	·	2.1 km	MPC · JPL
604811	2015 TE_{369}	—	September 19, 2003	Kitt Peak	Spacewatch	·	3.0 km	MPC · JPL
604812	2015 TS_{369}	—	September 15, 2009	Kitt Peak	Spacewatch	·	2.7 km	MPC · JPL
604813	2015 TZ_{369}	—	August 31, 2005	Kitt Peak	Spacewatch	·	1.3 km	MPC · JPL
604814	2015 TV_{373}	—	July 4, 2003	Kitt Peak	Spacewatch	·	2.7 km	MPC · JPL
604815	2015 TR_{374}	—	October 8, 2015	Haleakala	Pan-STARRS 1	·	1.4 km	MPC · JPL
604816	2015 TM_{379}	—	October 10, 2015	Haleakala	Pan-STARRS 1	·	2.3 km	MPC · JPL
604817	2015 TS_{381}	—	May 31, 2014	Haleakala	Pan-STARRS 1	·	1.8 km	MPC · JPL
604818	2015 TN_{387}	—	October 3, 2015	Haleakala	Pan-STARRS 1	·	2.7 km	MPC · JPL
604819	2015 TW_{387}	—	October 10, 2015	Haleakala	Pan-STARRS 1	·	3.1 km	MPC · JPL
604820	2015 TQ_{409}	—	October 2, 2015	Mount Lemmon	Mount Lemmon Survey	·	2.2 km	MPC · JPL
604821	2015 TR_{409}	—	September 28, 2003	Apache Point	SDSS Collaboration	·	2.2 km	MPC · JPL
604822	2015 TK_{411}	—	October 12, 2015	Haleakala	Pan-STARRS 1	ARM	2.4 km	MPC · JPL
604823	2015 TM_{411}	—	October 11, 2015	Mount Lemmon	Mount Lemmon Survey	·	930 m	MPC · JPL
604824	2015 TM_{415}	—	October 15, 2015	Haleakala	Pan-STARRS 1	·	2.4 km	MPC · JPL
604825	2015 TX_{416}	—	October 12, 2015	Haleakala	Pan-STARRS 1	·	2.3 km	MPC · JPL
604826	2015 TY_{416}	—	October 10, 2015	Haleakala	Pan-STARRS 1	·	1.8 km	MPC · JPL
604827 Rietavas	2015 TT_{429}	Rietavas	October 11, 2015	Baldone	K. Černis, I. Eglītis	·	770 m	MPC · JPL
604828	2015 TF_{436}	—	October 9, 2015	Haleakala	Pan-STARRS 1	EOS	1.4 km	MPC · JPL
604829	2015 UU_{12}	—	April 10, 2013	Haleakala	Pan-STARRS 1	·	2.5 km	MPC · JPL
604830	2015 UW_{14}	—	October 18, 2015	Haleakala	Pan-STARRS 1	·	2.0 km	MPC · JPL
604831	2015 UR_{16}	—	June 24, 2008	Kitt Peak	Spacewatch	EOS	1.7 km	MPC · JPL
604832	2015 UQ_{17}	—	February 25, 2012	Mount Lemmon	Mount Lemmon Survey	·	2.3 km	MPC · JPL
604833	2015 UQ_{20}	—	September 27, 2003	Kitt Peak	Spacewatch	·	2.5 km	MPC · JPL
604834	2015 UB_{24}	—	April 16, 2013	Haleakala	Pan-STARRS 1	·	2.8 km	MPC · JPL
604835	2015 UB_{25}	—	November 15, 2010	Kitt Peak	Spacewatch	·	2.4 km	MPC · JPL
604836	2015 UH_{25}	—	August 12, 2015	Haleakala	Pan-STARRS 1	·	2.3 km	MPC · JPL
604837	2015 UZ_{25}	—	September 23, 2015	Haleakala	Pan-STARRS 1	EOS	1.4 km	MPC · JPL
604838	2015 UM_{27}	—	September 23, 2015	Haleakala	Pan-STARRS 1	·	2.3 km	MPC · JPL
604839	2015 UF_{29}	—	August 18, 2009	Kitt Peak	Spacewatch	·	2.4 km	MPC · JPL
604840	2015 UE_{36}	—	July 2, 2014	Haleakala	Pan-STARRS 1	·	2.4 km	MPC · JPL
604841	2015 UM_{36}	—	September 9, 2015	Haleakala	Pan-STARRS 1	·	2.5 km	MPC · JPL
604842	2015 UG_{39}	—	March 2, 2006	Kitt Peak	Spacewatch	HYG	2.4 km	MPC · JPL
604843	2015 US_{39}	—	August 21, 2015	Haleakala	Pan-STARRS 1	·	1.7 km	MPC · JPL
604844	2015 UB_{47}	—	August 28, 2009	Kitt Peak	Spacewatch	·	2.0 km	MPC · JPL
604845	2015 UZ_{52}	—	November 23, 2011	Kitt Peak	Spacewatch	·	1.0 km	MPC · JPL
604846	2015 US_{53}	—	December 25, 2010	Mount Lemmon	Mount Lemmon Survey	·	2.7 km	MPC · JPL
604847	2015 UQ_{54}	—	August 12, 2015	Haleakala	Pan-STARRS 1	MAS	660 m	MPC · JPL
604848	2015 UU_{56}	—	August 12, 2015	Haleakala	Pan-STARRS 1	·	2.1 km	MPC · JPL
604849	2015 UE_{57}	—	September 18, 2009	Mount Lemmon	Mount Lemmon Survey	·	2.1 km	MPC · JPL
604850	2015 UO_{60}	—	January 30, 2012	Mount Lemmon	Mount Lemmon Survey	·	1.8 km	MPC · JPL
604851	2015 UW_{60}	—	June 28, 2014	Haleakala	Pan-STARRS 1	·	2.7 km	MPC · JPL
604852	2015 UJ_{63}	—	August 20, 2009	Kitt Peak	Spacewatch	EUP	2.7 km	MPC · JPL
604853	2015 UB_{64}	—	September 17, 2009	Catalina	CSS	·	3.1 km	MPC · JPL
604854	2015 UU_{69}	—	October 28, 2010	Mount Lemmon	Mount Lemmon Survey	·	3.0 km	MPC · JPL
604855	2015 UG_{70}	—	October 31, 2010	Piszkés-tető	K. Sárneczky, Z. Kuli	·	3.0 km	MPC · JPL
604856	2015 UR_{70}	—	September 23, 2015	Haleakala	Pan-STARRS 1	·	1.3 km	MPC · JPL
604857	2015 UD_{71}	—	August 12, 2015	Haleakala	Pan-STARRS 1	·	1.5 km	MPC · JPL
604858	2015 UB_{72}	—	September 20, 2015	Mount Lemmon	Mount Lemmon Survey	·	2.4 km	MPC · JPL
604859	2015 UJ_{73}	—	November 6, 2010	Mount Lemmon	Mount Lemmon Survey	EMA	2.5 km	MPC · JPL
604860	2015 UC_{74}	—	March 15, 2007	Kitt Peak	Spacewatch	VER	2.5 km	MPC · JPL
604861	2015 UG_{76}	—	November 8, 2010	Mount Lemmon	Mount Lemmon Survey	·	2.5 km	MPC · JPL
604862	2015 UL_{79}	—	August 12, 2015	Haleakala	Pan-STARRS 1	·	2.9 km	MPC · JPL
604863	2015 UM_{79}	—	May 26, 2014	Haleakala	Pan-STARRS 1	·	2.3 km	MPC · JPL
604864	2015 UU_{79}	—	October 24, 2015	Haleakala	Pan-STARRS 1	·	2.5 km	MPC · JPL
604865	2015 UF_{80}	—	September 30, 2003	Kitt Peak	Spacewatch	EUP	2.9 km	MPC · JPL
604866	2015 UO_{80}	—	January 8, 2011	Mount Lemmon	Mount Lemmon Survey	LUT	3.5 km	MPC · JPL
604867	2015 UQ_{87}	—	August 20, 2009	Kitt Peak	Spacewatch	·	2.6 km	MPC · JPL
604868	2015 UF_{88}	—	May 23, 2014	Haleakala	Pan-STARRS 1	·	1.4 km	MPC · JPL
604869	2015 UT_{88}	—	October 21, 2015	Haleakala	Pan-STARRS 1	TIN	760 m	MPC · JPL
604870	2015 UE_{91}	—	October 24, 2015	Mount Lemmon	Mount Lemmon Survey	·	2.0 km	MPC · JPL
604871	2015 UJ_{91}	—	October 23, 2015	Mount Lemmon	Mount Lemmon Survey	·	2.4 km	MPC · JPL
604872	2015 UK_{97}	—	October 23, 2015	Mount Lemmon	Mount Lemmon Survey	·	2.5 km	MPC · JPL
604873	2015 UQ_{98}	—	October 16, 2015	Mount Lemmon	Mount Lemmon Survey	·	1.9 km	MPC · JPL
604874	2015 VT	—	December 10, 2002	Socorro	LINEAR	H	590 m	MPC · JPL
604875	2015 VR_{3}	—	April 3, 2008	Mount Lemmon	Mount Lemmon Survey	·	2.9 km	MPC · JPL
604876	2015 VN_{4}	—	August 9, 2015	Haleakala	Pan-STARRS 1	·	1.9 km	MPC · JPL
604877	2015 VB_{6}	—	September 9, 2015	Haleakala	Pan-STARRS 1	T_{j} (2.98)	2.3 km	MPC · JPL
604878	2015 VE_{6}	—	February 1, 2012	Kitt Peak	Spacewatch	DOR	1.8 km	MPC · JPL
604879	2015 VA_{8}	—	April 28, 2014	Haleakala	Pan-STARRS 1	JUN	790 m	MPC · JPL
604880	2015 VR_{16}	—	March 8, 2013	Haleakala	Pan-STARRS 1	TIR	2.4 km	MPC · JPL
604881	2015 VE_{25}	—	November 3, 2007	Mount Lemmon	Mount Lemmon Survey	H	560 m	MPC · JPL
604882	2015 VC_{39}	—	February 4, 2006	Junk Bond	D. Healy	·	1.8 km	MPC · JPL
604883	2015 VC_{40}	—	September 22, 2009	Kitt Peak	Spacewatch	·	2.8 km	MPC · JPL
604884	2015 VP_{42}	—	August 19, 2009	Kitt Peak	Spacewatch	·	2.5 km	MPC · JPL
604885	2015 VL_{44}	—	July 23, 2015	Haleakala	Pan-STARRS 1	·	1.6 km	MPC · JPL
604886	2015 VZ_{44}	—	January 27, 2007	Kitt Peak	Spacewatch	·	2.7 km	MPC · JPL
604887	2015 VY_{47}	—	February 16, 2007	Palomar	NEAT	·	2.2 km	MPC · JPL
604888	2015 VC_{51}	—	July 25, 2015	Haleakala	Pan-STARRS 1	·	1.4 km	MPC · JPL
604889	2015 VE_{54}	—	September 30, 2006	Mount Lemmon	Mount Lemmon Survey	·	1.5 km	MPC · JPL
604890	2015 VK_{54}	—	May 7, 2014	Haleakala	Pan-STARRS 1	·	1.3 km	MPC · JPL
604891	2015 VH_{57}	—	October 14, 2015	Kitt Peak	Spacewatch	·	2.4 km	MPC · JPL
604892	2015 VY_{58}	—	December 2, 2010	Kitt Peak	Spacewatch	HYG	2.7 km	MPC · JPL
604893	2015 VC_{59}	—	October 12, 2015	Haleakala	Pan-STARRS 1	·	1.8 km	MPC · JPL
604894	2015 VQ_{61}	—	June 24, 2014	Haleakala	Pan-STARRS 1	·	2.1 km	MPC · JPL
604895	2015 VO_{62}	—	September 21, 2009	Kitt Peak	Spacewatch	·	2.0 km	MPC · JPL
604896	2015 VU_{67}	—	October 30, 2005	Mount Lemmon	Mount Lemmon Survey	EOS	2.4 km	MPC · JPL
604897	2015 VP_{68}	—	September 8, 2002	Haleakala	NEAT	JUN	690 m	MPC · JPL
604898	2015 VY_{71}	—	December 13, 2010	Mount Lemmon	Mount Lemmon Survey	·	2.5 km	MPC · JPL
604899	2015 VA_{76}	—	November 15, 2010	Mount Lemmon	Mount Lemmon Survey	·	2.3 km	MPC · JPL
604900	2015 VG_{79}	—	September 23, 2015	Haleakala	Pan-STARRS 1	·	2.3 km	MPC · JPL

== 604901–605000 ==
back to top

Designation			Discovery			Properties		Ref
Permanent	Provisional	Named after	Date	Site	Discoverer(s)	Category	Diam.	Ref
604901	2015 VP_{85}	—	June 5, 2014	Haleakala	Pan-STARRS 1	LIX	2.5 km	MPC · JPL
604902	2015 VG_{93}	—	April 16, 2005	Kitt Peak	Spacewatch	EUN	1.2 km	MPC · JPL
604903	2015 VY_{104}	—	October 16, 2015	Mount Lemmon	Mount Lemmon Survey	H	300 m	MPC · JPL
604904	2015 VT_{106}	—	September 12, 2015	Haleakala	Pan-STARRS 1	H	470 m	MPC · JPL
604905	2015 VQ_{107}	—	August 17, 2009	Catalina	CSS	·	3.4 km	MPC · JPL
604906	2015 VP_{108}	—	September 30, 2003	Kitt Peak	Spacewatch	·	740 m	MPC · JPL
604907	2015 VG_{114}	—	November 3, 2015	Space Surveillance	Space Surveillance Telescope	EUP	3.3 km	MPC · JPL
604908	2015 VX_{115}	—	August 12, 2010	Kitt Peak	Spacewatch	(13314)	1.8 km	MPC · JPL
604909	2015 VE_{116}	—	October 13, 2010	Catalina	CSS	·	2.5 km	MPC · JPL
604910	2015 VS_{117}	—	September 9, 2015	Haleakala	Pan-STARRS 1	·	2.4 km	MPC · JPL
604911	2015 VD_{118}	—	March 20, 2007	Anderson Mesa	LONEOS	·	3.5 km	MPC · JPL
604912	2015 VW_{119}	—	August 29, 2009	Catalina	CSS	·	2.7 km	MPC · JPL
604913	2015 VK_{122}	—	August 27, 2009	Catalina	CSS	LIX	3.9 km	MPC · JPL
604914	2015 VZ_{124}	—	August 12, 2015	Haleakala	Pan-STARRS 1	·	1.2 km	MPC · JPL
604915	2015 VG_{125}	—	August 27, 2005	Palomar	NEAT	·	2.7 km	MPC · JPL
604916	2015 VK_{129}	—	June 29, 2014	Haleakala	Pan-STARRS 1	EOS	1.7 km	MPC · JPL
604917	2015 VS_{132}	—	November 9, 2007	Mount Lemmon	Mount Lemmon Survey	·	1.8 km	MPC · JPL
604918	2015 VY_{134}	—	November 6, 2004	Palomar	NEAT	·	3.9 km	MPC · JPL
604919	2015 VF_{135}	—	November 12, 2010	Mount Lemmon	Mount Lemmon Survey	·	1.8 km	MPC · JPL
604920	2015 VV_{137}	—	April 18, 2007	Mount Lemmon	Mount Lemmon Survey	EOS	1.9 km	MPC · JPL
604921	2015 VM_{147}	—	September 15, 2009	Mount Lemmon	Mount Lemmon Survey	TIR	2.0 km	MPC · JPL
604922	2015 VE_{150}	—	November 3, 2015	Mount Lemmon	Mount Lemmon Survey	H	380 m	MPC · JPL
604923	2015 VV_{150}	—	February 11, 2000	Kitt Peak	Spacewatch	·	2.7 km	MPC · JPL
604924	2015 VW_{152}	—	October 26, 2012	Mount Lemmon	Mount Lemmon Survey	·	920 m	MPC · JPL
604925	2015 VK_{158}	—	January 30, 2011	Haleakala	Pan-STARRS 1	THB	2.1 km	MPC · JPL
604926	2015 VR_{176}	—	November 1, 2015	Mount Lemmon	Mount Lemmon Survey	·	2.9 km	MPC · JPL
604927	2015 VK_{189}	—	November 7, 2015	Haleakala	Pan-STARRS 1	·	2.2 km	MPC · JPL
604928	2015 WK_{5}	—	October 24, 2011	Haleakala	Pan-STARRS 1	·	1.6 km	MPC · JPL
604929	2015 WO_{7}	—	May 8, 2014	Haleakala	Pan-STARRS 1	·	980 m	MPC · JPL
604930	2015 WA_{16}	—	October 2, 2009	Mount Lemmon	Mount Lemmon Survey	·	3.8 km	MPC · JPL
604931	2015 WV_{32}	—	November 21, 2015	Mount Lemmon	Mount Lemmon Survey	KOR	970 m	MPC · JPL
604932	2015 XY_{2}	—	October 10, 2015	Haleakala	Pan-STARRS 1	(58892)	2.4 km	MPC · JPL
604933	2015 XL_{3}	—	July 25, 2015	Haleakala	Pan-STARRS 1	·	2.5 km	MPC · JPL
604934	2015 XC_{12}	—	December 1, 2005	Kitt Peak	Spacewatch	·	3.0 km	MPC · JPL
604935	2015 XA_{22}	—	August 16, 2009	Kitt Peak	Spacewatch	·	1.9 km	MPC · JPL
604936	2015 XO_{29}	—	November 10, 2015	Catalina	CSS	·	2.3 km	MPC · JPL
604937	2015 XT_{30}	—	September 9, 2015	Haleakala	Pan-STARRS 1	EOS	1.3 km	MPC · JPL
604938	2015 XJ_{43}	—	March 25, 2007	Mount Lemmon	Mount Lemmon Survey	EOS	1.8 km	MPC · JPL
604939	2015 XT_{46}	—	September 22, 2009	Kitt Peak	Spacewatch	·	2.0 km	MPC · JPL
604940	2015 XJ_{51}	—	October 21, 2015	Haleakala	Pan-STARRS 1	·	2.7 km	MPC · JPL
604941	2015 XQ_{57}	—	March 31, 2008	Mount Lemmon	Mount Lemmon Survey	·	1.7 km	MPC · JPL
604942	2015 XZ_{63}	—	September 6, 2004	Needville	Needville	EOS	1.4 km	MPC · JPL
604943	2015 XQ_{99}	—	October 26, 2008	Mount Lemmon	Mount Lemmon Survey	·	730 m	MPC · JPL
604944	2015 XZ_{105}	—	December 4, 2015	Haleakala	Pan-STARRS 1	·	2.7 km	MPC · JPL
604945	2015 XX_{115}	—	December 1, 2015	Haleakala	Pan-STARRS 1	·	2.2 km	MPC · JPL
604946	2015 XT_{118}	—	July 28, 2014	Haleakala	Pan-STARRS 1	EOS	1.4 km	MPC · JPL
604947	2015 XM_{124}	—	December 4, 2015	Haleakala	Pan-STARRS 1	·	1.2 km	MPC · JPL
604948	2015 XB_{125}	—	July 31, 2014	Haleakala	Pan-STARRS 1	·	2.4 km	MPC · JPL
604949	2015 XC_{129}	—	November 8, 2015	Mount Lemmon	Mount Lemmon Survey	H	400 m	MPC · JPL
604950	2015 XG_{130}	—	June 18, 2014	Mount Lemmon	Mount Lemmon Survey	·	1.4 km	MPC · JPL
604951	2015 XL_{130}	—	July 6, 2003	Kitt Peak	Spacewatch	·	3.0 km	MPC · JPL
604952	2015 XN_{131}	—	July 8, 2014	Haleakala	Pan-STARRS 1	·	2.5 km	MPC · JPL
604953	2015 XZ_{136}	—	November 7, 2015	Mount Lemmon	Mount Lemmon Survey	·	2.1 km	MPC · JPL
604954	2015 XW_{143}	—	October 1, 2008	Mount Lemmon	Mount Lemmon Survey	·	2.5 km	MPC · JPL
604955	2015 XP_{144}	—	September 20, 2014	Mount Lemmon	Mount Lemmon Survey	·	2.9 km	MPC · JPL
604956	2015 XX_{144}	—	August 28, 2014	Haleakala	Pan-STARRS 1	·	2.9 km	MPC · JPL
604957	2015 XF_{148}	—	December 10, 2010	Mount Lemmon	Mount Lemmon Survey	·	2.7 km	MPC · JPL
604958	2015 XM_{148}	—	September 29, 2008	Mount Lemmon	Mount Lemmon Survey	·	3.2 km	MPC · JPL
604959	2015 XL_{151}	—	February 7, 2008	Kitt Peak	Spacewatch	·	1.5 km	MPC · JPL
604960	2015 XR_{154}	—	July 28, 2014	Haleakala	Pan-STARRS 1	·	2.6 km	MPC · JPL
604961	2015 XW_{157}	—	January 18, 2012	Mount Lemmon	Mount Lemmon Survey	·	1.4 km	MPC · JPL
604962	2015 XA_{165}	—	March 25, 2012	Mount Lemmon	Mount Lemmon Survey	·	2.6 km	MPC · JPL
604963	2015 XZ_{167}	—	October 22, 2003	Kitt Peak	Spacewatch	·	2.5 km	MPC · JPL
604964	2015 XA_{171}	—	September 23, 2015	Haleakala	Pan-STARRS 1	·	1.1 km	MPC · JPL
604965	2015 XL_{172}	—	September 10, 2015	Haleakala	Pan-STARRS 1	·	2.8 km	MPC · JPL
604966	2015 XR_{172}	—	July 27, 2014	Haleakala	Pan-STARRS 1	·	2.3 km	MPC · JPL
604967	2015 XW_{172}	—	September 23, 2015	Haleakala	Pan-STARRS 1	·	2.2 km	MPC · JPL
604968	2015 XY_{179}	—	September 29, 2005	Mount Lemmon	Mount Lemmon Survey	·	530 m	MPC · JPL
604969	2015 XP_{185}	—	January 18, 2012	Mount Lemmon	Mount Lemmon Survey	·	1.6 km	MPC · JPL
604970	2015 XM_{188}	—	November 4, 2004	Kitt Peak	Spacewatch	·	4.2 km	MPC · JPL
604971	2015 XG_{191}	—	December 11, 2010	Mount Lemmon	Mount Lemmon Survey	TIR	2.6 km	MPC · JPL
604972	2015 XV_{191}	—	August 30, 2006	Anderson Mesa	LONEOS	·	1.9 km	MPC · JPL
604973	2015 XE_{193}	—	April 16, 2012	Bergisch Gladbach	W. Bickel	·	2.1 km	MPC · JPL
604974	2015 XH_{198}	—	August 17, 2009	Kitt Peak	Spacewatch	TIR	1.9 km	MPC · JPL
604975	2015 XP_{198}	—	December 6, 2015	Mount Lemmon	Mount Lemmon Survey	·	1.8 km	MPC · JPL
604976	2015 XS_{200}	—	December 24, 2006	Mount Lemmon	Mount Lemmon Survey	·	3.4 km	MPC · JPL
604977	2015 XL_{210}	—	November 22, 2015	Mount Lemmon	Mount Lemmon Survey	·	2.0 km	MPC · JPL
604978	2015 XE_{224}	—	January 29, 2011	Mayhill-ISON	L. Elenin	·	2.4 km	MPC · JPL
604979	2015 XB_{230}	—	November 18, 2015	Kitt Peak	Spacewatch	TIR	2.3 km	MPC · JPL
604980	2015 XF_{234}	—	July 25, 2014	Haleakala	Pan-STARRS 1	·	1.5 km	MPC · JPL
604981	2015 XC_{247}	—	June 28, 2014	Haleakala	Pan-STARRS 1	·	2.9 km	MPC · JPL
604982	2015 XF_{264}	—	December 6, 2015	Haleakala	Pan-STARRS 1	·	810 m	MPC · JPL
604983	2015 XQ_{264}	—	September 2, 2014	Haleakala	Pan-STARRS 1	·	2.3 km	MPC · JPL
604984	2015 XX_{272}	—	October 11, 2005	Kitt Peak	Spacewatch	·	470 m	MPC · JPL
604985	2015 XF_{285}	—	August 23, 2014	Haleakala	Pan-STARRS 1	·	2.4 km	MPC · JPL
604986	2015 XO_{303}	—	April 11, 2013	Oukaïmeden	C. Rinner	·	3.6 km	MPC · JPL
604987	2015 XW_{311}	—	December 8, 2015	Mount Lemmon	Mount Lemmon Survey	EUP	2.3 km	MPC · JPL
604988	2015 XX_{311}	—	June 7, 2013	Haleakala	Pan-STARRS 1	KOR	1.2 km	MPC · JPL
604989	2015 XQ_{318}	—	September 3, 2008	Kitt Peak	Spacewatch	·	530 m	MPC · JPL
604990	2015 XL_{338}	—	July 8, 2014	Haleakala	Pan-STARRS 1	·	1.5 km	MPC · JPL
604991	2015 XA_{346}	—	June 28, 2014	Haleakala	Pan-STARRS 1	·	1.9 km	MPC · JPL
604992	2015 XP_{346}	—	January 4, 2011	Mount Lemmon	Mount Lemmon Survey	·	2.1 km	MPC · JPL
604993	2015 XP_{347}	—	December 8, 2015	Haleakala	Pan-STARRS 1	·	1.9 km	MPC · JPL
604994	2015 XZ_{348}	—	December 8, 2010	Mount Lemmon	Mount Lemmon Survey	EOS	1.6 km	MPC · JPL
604995	2015 XT_{359}	—	July 29, 2008	Kitt Peak	Spacewatch	·	620 m	MPC · JPL
604996	2015 XK_{362}	—	May 6, 2002	Kitt Peak	Spacewatch	T_{j} (2.97)	2.9 km	MPC · JPL
604997	2015 XM_{365}	—	December 12, 2015	Haleakala	Pan-STARRS 1	V	660 m	MPC · JPL
604998	2015 XN_{373}	—	August 28, 2014	Haleakala	Pan-STARRS 1	·	2.1 km	MPC · JPL
604999	2015 XH_{392}	—	December 9, 2015	Haleakala	Pan-STARRS 1	·	1.9 km	MPC · JPL
605000	2015 XT_{397}	—	December 4, 2015	Mount Lemmon	Mount Lemmon Survey	·	2.1 km	MPC · JPL

back to top

== Meaning of names ==
As minor planet discoveries are confirmed, they are given a permanent number by the IAU's Minor Planet Center (MPC), and the discoverers can then submit names for them, following the IAU's naming conventions. The list below concerns those minor planets in the specified number-range that have received names, and explains the meanings of those names.

Official naming citations of newly named small Solar System bodies are approved and published in a bulletin by IAU's Working Group for Small Bodies Nomenclature (WGSBN). Before May 2021, citations were published in MPC's Minor Planet Circulars for many decades. Recent citations can also be found on the JPL Small-Body Database (SBDB). Until his death in 2016, German astronomer Lutz D. Schmadel compiled these citations into the Dictionary of Minor Planet Names (DMP) and regularly updated the collection.

Based on Paul Herget's The Names of the Minor Planets, Schmadel also researched the unclear origin of numerous asteroids, most of which had been named prior to World War II. This article incorporates text from this source, which is in the public domain: SBDB New namings may only be added to this list below after official publication as the preannouncement of names is condemned. The WGSBN publishes a comprehensive guideline for the naming rules of non-cometary small Solar System bodies.

Named minor planet	Provisional	This minor planet was named for...	Ref · Catalog
604001 Iagiellonica	2015 KC_{7}	Iagiellonica is the Latin name of the Jagiellonian University, which was founded in 1364 by Casimir III the Great. The university is one of the leading research institutions in Poland. One of its most famous alumni was Nicolaus Copernicus, whose de Revolutionibus is kept in the Jagiellonian Library.	IAU · 604001
604429 Lokhorst	2015 PD_{274}	Deborah Lokhorst, Canadian astronomer at the National Research Council of Canada’s Herzberg Astronomy & Astrophysics Research Centre.	IAU · 604429
604468 Olenici	2015 QL_{15}	Dimitrie Olenici (b. 1949), a Romanian physicist.	IAU · 604468
604750 Mārisābele	2015 TO_{260}	Māris Ābele (1937–2022) was a Latvian astronomer and a designer of satellite tracking devices. He constructed the widely-used photographic satellite camera AFU-75 and several satellite laser-ranging telescopes that are used worldwide.	IAU · 604750
604772 Paraschiv	2015 TS_{293}	Alin Paraschiv, Romanian solar physicist who works at the National Solar Observatory, USA.	IAU · 604772
604773 Michaelmöller	2015 TW_{294}	Michael Möller (b. 1953), a German amateur astronomer.	IAU · 604773
604827 Rietavas	2015 TT_{429}	Rietavas is the capital of Rietavas Municipality in Lithuania. The city is famous for building the first power station to produce electricity in Lithuania in 1892. The first telephone line in Lithuania was also built there.	IAU · 604827
