= List of minor planets: 658001–659000 =

The following is a partial list of minor planets, running from minor-planet number 658001 through 659000, inclusive. The primary data for this and other partial lists is based on JPL's "Small-Body Orbital Elements" and data available from the Minor Planet Center. Critical list information is also provided by the MPC, unless otherwise specified from Lowell Observatory. A detailed description of the table's columns and additional sources are given on the main page including a complete list of every page in this series, and a statistical break-up on the dynamical classification of minor planets.

Also see the summary list of all named bodies in numerical and alphabetical order, and the corresponding naming citations for the number range of this particular list. New namings may only be added to this list after official publication, as the preannouncement of names is condemned by the Working Group for Small Bodies Nomenclature of the International Astronomical Union.

Near-Earth obj.	MBA (inner)	MBA (outer)	Centaur
Mars-crosser	MBA (middle)	Jupiter trojan	Trans-Neptunian obj.
Unclassified

== 658001–658100 ==
Designation			Discovery			Properties		Ref
Permanent	Provisional	Named after	Date	Site	Discoverer(s)	Category	Diam.	Ref
658001	2017 EK_{25}	—	December 23, 2012	Haleakala	Pan-STARRS 1	·	870 m	MPC; JPL
658002	2017 EX_{30}	—	March 7, 2017	Haleakala	Pan-STARRS 1	·	1.3 km	MPC; JPL
658003	2017 EA_{31}	—	March 2, 2017	Mount Lemmon	Mount Lemmon Survey	·	1.2 km	MPC; JPL
658004	2017 EW_{32}	—	March 7, 2017	Haleakala	Pan-STARRS 1	·	1.6 km	MPC; JPL
658005	2017 EC_{33}	—	March 4, 2017	Haleakala	Pan-STARRS 1	V	440 m	MPC; JPL
658006	2017 EG_{36}	—	April 6, 2005	Mount Lemmon	Mount Lemmon Survey	(194)	1.0 km	MPC; JPL
658007	2017 EA_{37}	—	March 5, 2017	Haleakala	Pan-STARRS 1	·	1.2 km	MPC; JPL
658008	2017 EU_{37}	—	March 8, 2017	Mount Lemmon	Mount Lemmon Survey	·	840 m	MPC; JPL
658009	2017 EJ_{40}	—	March 6, 2008	Mount Lemmon	Mount Lemmon Survey	·	1.1 km	MPC; JPL
658010	2017 EJ_{43}	—	September 22, 2014	Haleakala	Pan-STARRS 1	·	900 m	MPC; JPL
658011	2017 FU_{1}	—	June 21, 2015	Haleakala	Pan-STARRS 1	H	430 m	MPC; JPL
658012	2017 FM_{6}	—	February 25, 2006	Mount Lemmon	Mount Lemmon Survey	·	790 m	MPC; JPL
658013	2017 FV_{7}	—	February 25, 2006	Mount Lemmon	Mount Lemmon Survey	·	870 m	MPC; JPL
658014	2017 FH_{8}	—	October 27, 2005	Mount Lemmon	Mount Lemmon Survey	·	2.5 km	MPC; JPL
658015	2017 FE_{10}	—	October 11, 2007	Catalina	CSS	·	1.4 km	MPC; JPL
658016	2017 FH_{10}	—	October 13, 2015	Kitt Peak	Spacewatch	·	810 m	MPC; JPL
658017	2017 FF_{15}	—	March 16, 2007	Mount Lemmon	Mount Lemmon Survey	EOS	1.6 km	MPC; JPL
658018	2017 FO_{15}	—	February 24, 2006	Kitt Peak	Spacewatch	·	800 m	MPC; JPL
658019	2017 FP_{23}	—	October 2, 2006	Catalina	CSS	·	2.3 km	MPC; JPL
658020	2017 FE_{24}	—	March 7, 2003	Socorro	LINEAR	·	810 m	MPC; JPL
658021	2017 FU_{26}	—	March 7, 2017	Mount Lemmon	Mount Lemmon Survey	V	530 m	MPC; JPL
658022	2017 FX_{26}	—	March 29, 2009	Kitt Peak	Spacewatch	·	1.0 km	MPC; JPL
658023	2017 FV_{27}	—	April 9, 2003	Palomar	NEAT	(2076)	840 m	MPC; JPL
658024	2017 FS_{28}	—	March 14, 2013	Kitt Peak	Spacewatch	BRG	1.0 km	MPC; JPL
658025	2017 FN_{29}	—	March 26, 2001	Kitt Peak	Deep Ecliptic Survey	·	2.4 km	MPC; JPL
658026	2017 FB_{32}	—	April 18, 2013	Kitt Peak	Spacewatch	·	1.4 km	MPC; JPL
658027	2017 FL_{41}	—	November 25, 2005	Mount Lemmon	Mount Lemmon Survey	NYS	820 m	MPC; JPL
658028	2017 FG_{44}	—	September 14, 2013	Haleakala	Pan-STARRS 1	·	2.6 km	MPC; JPL
658029	2017 FB_{46}	—	June 16, 2007	Kitt Peak	Spacewatch	·	4.2 km	MPC; JPL
658030	2017 FQ_{51}	—	October 29, 2005	Kitt Peak	Spacewatch	·	1.6 km	MPC; JPL
658031	2017 FU_{52}	—	April 30, 2005	Kitt Peak	Spacewatch	·	990 m	MPC; JPL
658032	2017 FA_{53}	—	February 4, 2009	Mount Lemmon	Mount Lemmon Survey	H	560 m	MPC; JPL
658033	2017 FM_{54}	—	October 10, 2015	Haleakala	Pan-STARRS 1	·	1.8 km	MPC; JPL
658034	2017 FD_{62}	—	January 5, 2013	Mount Lemmon	Mount Lemmon Survey	·	860 m	MPC; JPL
658035	2017 FF_{68}	—	December 23, 2012	Haleakala	Pan-STARRS 1	·	1 km	MPC; JPL
658036	2017 FC_{70}	—	September 6, 2015	Kitt Peak	Spacewatch	PHO	690 m	MPC; JPL
658037	2017 FM_{72}	—	January 29, 2017	Haleakala	Pan-STARRS 1	·	850 m	MPC; JPL
658038	2017 FN_{72}	—	October 21, 2009	Mount Lemmon	Mount Lemmon Survey	EOS	2.1 km	MPC; JPL
658039	2017 FC_{76}	—	August 23, 2014	Haleakala	Pan-STARRS 1	EUN	870 m	MPC; JPL
658040	2017 FF_{77}	—	February 8, 1999	Mauna Kea	Anderson, J., Veillet, C.	·	1.7 km	MPC; JPL
658041	2017 FQ_{77}	—	November 23, 2006	Kitt Peak	Spacewatch	3:2 · SHU	5.6 km	MPC; JPL
658042	2017 FJ_{80}	—	January 28, 2006	Mount Lemmon	Mount Lemmon Survey	·	800 m	MPC; JPL
658043	2017 FM_{81}	—	February 20, 2006	Mount Lemmon	Mount Lemmon Survey	·	910 m	MPC; JPL
658044	2017 FS_{81}	—	October 22, 2008	Kitt Peak	Spacewatch	·	1.2 km	MPC; JPL
658045	2017 FF_{85}	—	January 31, 2013	Mount Lemmon	Mount Lemmon Survey	·	1.1 km	MPC; JPL
658046	2017 FQ_{85}	—	August 6, 2005	Palomar	NEAT	·	1.6 km	MPC; JPL
658047	2017 FJ_{89}	—	March 20, 2004	Kitt Peak	Spacewatch	·	1.7 km	MPC; JPL
658048	2017 FY_{89}	—	January 19, 2012	Mount Lemmon	Mount Lemmon Survey	H	400 m	MPC; JPL
658049	2017 FU_{91}	—	April 18, 2007	Kitt Peak	Spacewatch	(2076)	760 m	MPC; JPL
658050	2017 FU_{94}	—	December 10, 2010	Mount Lemmon	Mount Lemmon Survey	·	1.9 km	MPC; JPL
658051	2017 FP_{96}	—	February 3, 2017	Haleakala	Pan-STARRS 1	·	800 m	MPC; JPL
658052	2017 FQ_{98}	—	September 14, 2010	Mount Lemmon	Mount Lemmon Survey	·	1.2 km	MPC; JPL
658053	2017 FX_{98}	—	March 5, 2017	Haleakala	Pan-STARRS 1	·	2.1 km	MPC; JPL
658054	2017 FW_{100}	—	March 19, 2017	Haleakala	Pan-STARRS 1	·	750 m	MPC; JPL
658055	2017 FH_{103}	—	February 21, 2006	Catalina	CSS	·	1.2 km	MPC; JPL
658056	2017 FQ_{105}	—	April 15, 2010	Mount Lemmon	Mount Lemmon Survey	·	930 m	MPC; JPL
658057	2017 FY_{110}	—	March 5, 2006	Kitt Peak	Spacewatch	MAS	570 m	MPC; JPL
658058	2017 FB_{112}	—	February 1, 2006	Mount Lemmon	Mount Lemmon Survey	·	980 m	MPC; JPL
658059	2017 FJ_{112}	—	May 20, 2010	Mount Lemmon	Mount Lemmon Survey	·	980 m	MPC; JPL
658060	2017 FQ_{116}	—	February 16, 2009	Kitt Peak	Spacewatch	3:2	4.9 km	MPC; JPL
658061	2017 FZ_{118}	—	October 9, 2015	Haleakala	Pan-STARRS 1	·	1.9 km	MPC; JPL
658062	2017 FJ_{121}	—	October 23, 2008	Kitt Peak	Spacewatch	·	950 m	MPC; JPL
658063	2017 FL_{122}	—	January 28, 2017	Haleakala	Pan-STARRS 1	·	750 m	MPC; JPL
658064	2017 FE_{125}	—	December 23, 2012	Haleakala	Pan-STARRS 1	·	860 m	MPC; JPL
658065	2017 FR_{125}	—	October 8, 2015	Haleakala	Pan-STARRS 1	·	1.0 km	MPC; JPL
658066	2017 FC_{126}	—	September 26, 2005	Kitt Peak	Spacewatch	·	1.9 km	MPC; JPL
658067	2017 FD_{127}	—	November 9, 2004	Mauna Kea	Veillet, C.	·	760 m	MPC; JPL
658068	2017 FK_{127}	—	March 29, 2017	Mount Lemmon	Mount Lemmon Survey	H	410 m	MPC; JPL
658069	2017 FB_{128}	—	September 19, 2014	Haleakala	Pan-STARRS 1	·	1.7 km	MPC; JPL
658070	2017 FC_{129}	—	April 10, 2013	Haleakala	Pan-STARRS 1	·	1.1 km	MPC; JPL
658071	2017 FD_{129}	—	January 27, 2017	Haleakala	Pan-STARRS 1	·	620 m	MPC; JPL
658072	2017 FP_{129}	—	March 4, 2017	Haleakala	Pan-STARRS 1	·	740 m	MPC; JPL
658073	2017 FK_{132}	—	March 20, 2017	Haleakala	Pan-STARRS 1	SUL	1.5 km	MPC; JPL
658074	2017 FN_{133}	—	August 26, 2003	Cerro Tololo	Deep Ecliptic Survey	·	2.5 km	MPC; JPL
658075	2017 FH_{142}	—	September 27, 2009	Mount Lemmon	Mount Lemmon Survey	·	1.7 km	MPC; JPL
658076	2017 FZ_{149}	—	September 4, 2010	Kitt Peak	Spacewatch	·	1.1 km	MPC; JPL
658077	2017 FK_{151}	—	September 12, 2005	Kitt Peak	Spacewatch	·	1.6 km	MPC; JPL
658078	2017 FW_{153}	—	March 4, 2017	Haleakala	Pan-STARRS 1	·	910 m	MPC; JPL
658079	2017 FB_{154}	—	July 15, 2013	Haleakala	Pan-STARRS 1	·	1.7 km	MPC; JPL
658080	2017 FT_{157}	—	November 9, 2008	Kitt Peak	Spacewatch	·	990 m	MPC; JPL
658081	2017 FE_{158}	—	June 18, 2013	Haleakala	Pan-STARRS 1	·	1.8 km	MPC; JPL
658082	2017 FL_{160}	—	August 20, 2014	Haleakala	Pan-STARRS 1	NYS	990 m	MPC; JPL
658083	2017 FH_{161}	—	February 16, 2013	Mount Lemmon	Mount Lemmon Survey	·	1.0 km	MPC; JPL
658084	2017 FT_{161}	—	April 8, 2006	Kitt Peak	Spacewatch	NYS	880 m	MPC; JPL
658085	2017 FL_{165}	—	March 19, 2017	Haleakala	Pan-STARRS 1	·	860 m	MPC; JPL
658086	2017 FV_{169}	—	April 3, 2017	Mount Lemmon	Mount Lemmon Survey	·	1.7 km	MPC; JPL
658087	2017 FQ_{174}	—	March 23, 2017	Haleakala	Pan-STARRS 1	·	1.1 km	MPC; JPL
658088	2017 FQ_{175}	—	March 18, 2017	Haleakala	Pan-STARRS 1	H	320 m	MPC; JPL
658089	2017 FU_{175}	—	March 21, 2017	Haleakala	Pan-STARRS 1	H	470 m	MPC; JPL
658090	2017 FZ_{188}	—	March 20, 2017	Haleakala	Pan-STARRS 1	RAF	650 m	MPC; JPL
658091	2017 FL_{189}	—	March 27, 2017	Haleakala	Pan-STARRS 1	·	1.0 km	MPC; JPL
658092	2017 FV_{189}	—	July 8, 2014	Haleakala	Pan-STARRS 1	SUL	1.5 km	MPC; JPL
658093	2017 FF_{201}	—	March 20, 2017	Haleakala	Pan-STARRS 1	·	1.1 km	MPC; JPL
658094	2017 GZ_{3}	—	February 6, 2006	Kitt Peak	Spacewatch	·	2.6 km	MPC; JPL
658095	2017 GF_{5}	—	December 30, 2008	Mount Lemmon	Mount Lemmon Survey	H	490 m	MPC; JPL
658096	2017 GE_{7}	—	November 20, 2001	Kitt Peak	Spacewatch	·	1 km	MPC; JPL
658097	2017 GG_{10}	—	March 14, 2013	Catalina	CSS	·	1.3 km	MPC; JPL
658098	2017 GL_{14}	—	April 1, 2017	Haleakala	Pan-STARRS 1	·	880 m	MPC; JPL
658099	2017 GH_{16}	—	April 5, 2017	Haleakala	Pan-STARRS 1	·	2.2 km	MPC; JPL
658100	2017 GT_{20}	—	April 1, 2017	Haleakala	Pan-STARRS 1	·	870 m	MPC; JPL

== 658101–658200 ==
back to top

Designation			Discovery			Properties		Ref
Permanent	Provisional	Named after	Date	Site	Discoverer(s)	Category	Diam.	Ref
658101	2017 GE_{21}	—	April 6, 2017	Haleakala	Pan-STARRS 1	EUN	830 m	MPC; JPL
658102	2017 GH_{24}	—	April 4, 2017	Haleakala	Pan-STARRS 1	H	360 m	MPC; JPL
658103	2017 GY_{25}	—	April 6, 2017	Haleakala	Pan-STARRS 1	·	1.1 km	MPC; JPL
658104	2017 HO_{1}	—	March 20, 2007	Kitt Peak	Spacewatch	H	470 m	MPC; JPL
658105	2017 HE_{2}	—	December 4, 2013	Haleakala	Pan-STARRS 1	H	390 m	MPC; JPL
658106	2017 HQ_{2}	—	November 29, 2005	Palomar	NEAT	H	460 m	MPC; JPL
658107	2017 HF_{9}	—	November 22, 2015	Mount Lemmon	Mount Lemmon Survey	·	950 m	MPC; JPL
658108	2017 HY_{12}	—	March 20, 2017	Haleakala	Pan-STARRS 1	·	1.2 km	MPC; JPL
658109	2017 HX_{14}	—	April 5, 2002	Palomar	NEAT	·	1.1 km	MPC; JPL
658110	2017 HD_{17}	—	May 8, 2006	Mount Lemmon	Mount Lemmon Survey	·	3.2 km	MPC; JPL
658111	2017 HQ_{17}	—	March 24, 2006	Kitt Peak	Spacewatch	·	1.1 km	MPC; JPL
658112	2017 HA_{18}	—	October 10, 2007	Kitt Peak	Spacewatch	THB	2.9 km	MPC; JPL
658113	2017 HQ_{21}	—	March 15, 2013	Mount Lemmon	Mount Lemmon Survey	·	970 m	MPC; JPL
658114	2017 HQ_{32}	—	October 25, 2005	Mount Lemmon	Mount Lemmon Survey	·	1.6 km	MPC; JPL
658115	2017 HD_{36}	—	October 10, 2007	Mount Lemmon	Mount Lemmon Survey	·	1.2 km	MPC; JPL
658116	2017 HC_{44}	—	December 1, 2008	Kitt Peak	Spacewatch	MAS	560 m	MPC; JPL
658117	2017 HX_{50}	—	January 11, 2016	Haleakala	Pan-STARRS 1	·	1.8 km	MPC; JPL
658118	2017 HZ_{50}	—	September 16, 2009	Mount Lemmon	Mount Lemmon Survey	·	2.7 km	MPC; JPL
658119	2017 HJ_{55}	—	February 20, 2009	Kitt Peak	Spacewatch	NYS	800 m	MPC; JPL
658120	2017 HC_{64}	—	April 20, 2017	Haleakala	Pan-STARRS 1	·	1.4 km	MPC; JPL
658121	2017 HT_{64}	—	October 26, 2014	Mount Lemmon	Mount Lemmon Survey	·	2.0 km	MPC; JPL
658122	2017 HA_{65}	—	April 27, 2017	Haleakala	Pan-STARRS 1	H	380 m	MPC; JPL
658123	2017 HA_{69}	—	April 26, 2017	Haleakala	Pan-STARRS 1	·	1.8 km	MPC; JPL
658124	2017 HY_{69}	—	March 31, 2013	Mount Lemmon	Mount Lemmon Survey	·	870 m	MPC; JPL
658125	2017 HQ_{72}	—	September 18, 2010	Kitt Peak	Spacewatch	HNS	760 m	MPC; JPL
658126	2017 HB_{75}	—	April 26, 2017	Haleakala	Pan-STARRS 1	·	1.3 km	MPC; JPL
658127	2017 HQ_{75}	—	April 26, 2017	Haleakala	Pan-STARRS 1	·	1.1 km	MPC; JPL
658128	2017 HL_{76}	—	August 3, 2014	Haleakala	Pan-STARRS 1	·	990 m	MPC; JPL
658129 Zwitter	2017 HV_{78}	Zwitter	April 18, 2017	Mount Lemmon	Mount Lemmon Survey	·	1.7 km	MPC; JPL
658130	2017 HN_{104}	—	April 26, 2017	Haleakala	Pan-STARRS 1	·	1.5 km	MPC; JPL
658131	2017 JS	—	October 26, 2011	Haleakala	Pan-STARRS 1	·	1.1 km	MPC; JPL
658132	2017 JB_{1}	—	May 26, 2012	Mount Lemmon	Mount Lemmon Survey	H	330 m	MPC; JPL
658133	2017 JR_{4}	—	April 13, 2008	Catalina	CSS	·	1.8 km	MPC; JPL
658134	2017 JJ_{5}	—	December 16, 2014	Haleakala	Pan-STARRS 1	·	3.1 km	MPC; JPL
658135	2017 JO_{5}	—	April 6, 2017	Mount Lemmon	Mount Lemmon Survey	·	1.4 km	MPC; JPL
658136	2017 JR_{7}	—	May 6, 2017	Haleakala	Pan-STARRS 1	H	390 m	MPC; JPL
658137	2017 JU_{11}	—	May 4, 2017	Haleakala	Pan-STARRS 1	H	460 m	MPC; JPL
658138	2017 KP_{3}	—	March 29, 2017	Haleakala	Pan-STARRS 1	H	520 m	MPC; JPL
658139	2017 KY_{5}	—	June 18, 2013	Haleakala	Pan-STARRS 1	·	1.2 km	MPC; JPL
658140	2017 KG_{12}	—	July 19, 2013	Haleakala	Pan-STARRS 1	·	1.3 km	MPC; JPL
658141	2017 KE_{14}	—	February 1, 2016	Haleakala	Pan-STARRS 1	·	1.8 km	MPC; JPL
658142	2017 KS_{17}	—	May 18, 2017	Haleakala	Pan-STARRS 1	·	1.2 km	MPC; JPL
658143	2017 KC_{21}	—	February 4, 2003	La Silla	Barbieri, C.	EUN	1.0 km	MPC; JPL
658144	2017 KU_{25}	—	February 13, 2008	Kitt Peak	Spacewatch	·	1.0 km	MPC; JPL
658145	2017 KV_{28}	—	November 10, 2004	Kitt Peak	Spacewatch	DOR	1.9 km	MPC; JPL
658146	2017 KD_{31}	—	August 9, 2004	Palomar	NEAT	H	530 m	MPC; JPL
658147	2017 KZ_{32}	—	September 18, 2014	Haleakala	Pan-STARRS 1	·	1.0 km	MPC; JPL
658148	2017 KN_{33}	—	December 30, 2008	Kitt Peak	Spacewatch	·	1.2 km	MPC; JPL
658149	2017 KV_{33}	—	March 18, 2004	Socorro	LINEAR	·	1.3 km	MPC; JPL
658150	2017 KL_{34}	—	December 5, 2010	Kitt Peak	Spacewatch	H	480 m	MPC; JPL
658151	2017 KL_{37}	—	May 4, 2017	Haleakala	Pan-STARRS 1	ADE	1.5 km	MPC; JPL
658152	2017 KO_{38}	—	May 29, 2017	Haleakala	Pan-STARRS 1	H	450 m	MPC; JPL
658153	2017 KD_{39}	—	May 28, 2008	Kitt Peak	Spacewatch	HNS	970 m	MPC; JPL
658154	2017 KW_{41}	—	May 27, 2017	Haleakala	Pan-STARRS 1	·	960 m	MPC; JPL
658155	2017 LN_{1}	—	April 29, 2009	Kitt Peak	Spacewatch	H	460 m	MPC; JPL
658156	2017 LW_{1}	—	July 8, 2003	Kitt Peak	Spacewatch	·	2.1 km	MPC; JPL
658157	2017 MD_{2}	—	October 15, 2001	Palomar	NEAT	·	2.4 km	MPC; JPL
658158	2017 MN_{9}	—	December 29, 2014	Haleakala	Pan-STARRS 1	·	2.5 km	MPC; JPL
658159	2017 MT_{10}	—	November 19, 2003	Kitt Peak	Spacewatch	·	1.7 km	MPC; JPL
658160	2017 MA_{15}	—	February 8, 2011	Mount Lemmon	Mount Lemmon Survey	·	1.2 km	MPC; JPL
658161	2017 MZ_{15}	—	June 29, 2017	Mount Lemmon	Mount Lemmon Survey	H	560 m	MPC; JPL
658162	2017 MP_{17}	—	June 23, 2017	Haleakala	Pan-STARRS 1	·	960 m	MPC; JPL
658163	2017 MP_{18}	—	June 23, 2017	Haleakala	Pan-STARRS 1	·	980 m	MPC; JPL
658164	2017 MS_{18}	—	June 24, 2017	Haleakala	Pan-STARRS 1	ADE	1.4 km	MPC; JPL
658165	2017 MW_{21}	—	June 25, 2017	Haleakala	Pan-STARRS 1	·	1.9 km	MPC; JPL
658166	2017 MS_{24}	—	April 12, 2016	Haleakala	Pan-STARRS 1	·	1.9 km	MPC; JPL
658167	2017 ML_{27}	—	January 17, 2015	Haleakala	Pan-STARRS 1	·	1.4 km	MPC; JPL
658168	2017 MT_{29}	—	October 6, 2008	Mount Lemmon	Mount Lemmon Survey	·	1.3 km	MPC; JPL
658169	2017 MQ_{38}	—	December 4, 2007	Catalina	CSS	·	2.8 km	MPC; JPL
658170	2017 NF	—	April 1, 2003	Apache Point	SDSS	·	1.9 km	MPC; JPL
658171	2017 NO	—	January 23, 2015	Haleakala	Pan-STARRS 1	BRA	1.2 km	MPC; JPL
658172	2017 NG_{1}	—	March 11, 2008	Kitt Peak	Spacewatch	·	1.1 km	MPC; JPL
658173	2017 NU_{2}	—	March 24, 2012	Mount Lemmon	Mount Lemmon Survey	·	830 m	MPC; JPL
658174	2017 NP_{3}	—	January 29, 2003	Apache Point	SDSS	BRG	1.4 km	MPC; JPL
658175	2017 NF_{5}	—	February 6, 2016	Haleakala	Pan-STARRS 1	(1547)	1.6 km	MPC; JPL
658176	2017 NM_{5}	—	July 5, 2017	Haleakala	Pan-STARRS 1	EUP	3.2 km	MPC; JPL
658177	2017 NT_{9}	—	July 5, 2017	Haleakala	Pan-STARRS 1	·	1.7 km	MPC; JPL
658178	2017 NU_{10}	—	March 29, 2016	Cerro Tololo-DECam	DECam	·	1.3 km	MPC; JPL
658179	2017 NE_{16}	—	July 15, 2017	Haleakala	Pan-STARRS 1	·	1.8 km	MPC; JPL
658180	2017 NP_{22}	—	July 1, 2017	Haleakala	Pan-STARRS 1	·	1.9 km	MPC; JPL
658181	2017 NB_{27}	—	July 5, 2017	Haleakala	Pan-STARRS 1	·	1.2 km	MPC; JPL
658182	2017 NT_{32}	—	July 4, 2017	Haleakala	Pan-STARRS 1	·	2.3 km	MPC; JPL
658183	2017 OH	—	August 13, 2013	Haleakala	Pan-STARRS 1	EUN	1.2 km	MPC; JPL
658184	2017 OQ	—	July 19, 2017	XuYi	PMO NEO Survey Program	·	2.6 km	MPC; JPL
658185	2017 OH_{4}	—	August 17, 2006	Palomar	NEAT	TIR	2.4 km	MPC; JPL
658186	2017 OL_{5}	—	September 7, 2008	Mount Lemmon	Mount Lemmon Survey	MRX	750 m	MPC; JPL
658187	2017 OG_{9}	—	January 4, 2016	Haleakala	Pan-STARRS 1	·	1.8 km	MPC; JPL
658188	2017 OY_{9}	—	July 15, 2017	Haleakala	Pan-STARRS 1	·	1.8 km	MPC; JPL
658189	2017 OD_{10}	—	December 8, 2010	Mount Lemmon	Mount Lemmon Survey	·	2.2 km	MPC; JPL
658190	2017 OH_{10}	—	September 7, 2008	Mount Lemmon	Mount Lemmon Survey	·	1.5 km	MPC; JPL
658191	2017 OS_{17}	—	May 21, 2017	Mount Lemmon	Mount Lemmon Survey	JUN	850 m	MPC; JPL
658192	2017 OX_{20}	—	May 16, 2012	Mount Lemmon	Mount Lemmon Survey	MRX	880 m	MPC; JPL
658193	2017 OF_{21}	—	July 25, 2017	Haleakala	Pan-STARRS 1	·	2.0 km	MPC; JPL
658194	2017 OG_{21}	—	March 9, 2002	Palomar	NEAT	·	2.1 km	MPC; JPL
658195	2017 OO_{21}	—	June 13, 2004	Kitt Peak	Spacewatch	·	1.2 km	MPC; JPL
658196	2017 OO_{24}	—	February 24, 2012	Kitt Peak	Spacewatch	·	740 m	MPC; JPL
658197	2017 OD_{25}	—	August 23, 2006	Palomar	NEAT	·	2.6 km	MPC; JPL
658198	2017 OT_{25}	—	October 5, 2007	Kitt Peak	Spacewatch	·	1.8 km	MPC; JPL
658199	2017 OK_{26}	—	May 1, 2016	Cerro Tololo-DECam	DECam	·	1.7 km	MPC; JPL
658200	2017 OJ_{27}	—	October 7, 2007	Mount Lemmon	Mount Lemmon Survey	·	1.8 km	MPC; JPL

== 658201–658300 ==
back to top

Designation			Discovery			Properties		Ref
Permanent	Provisional	Named after	Date	Site	Discoverer(s)	Category	Diam.	Ref
658201	2017 OG_{28}	—	October 20, 2012	Haleakala	Pan-STARRS 1	·	2.2 km	MPC; JPL
658202	2017 OX_{30}	—	May 26, 2006	Mount Lemmon	Mount Lemmon Survey	·	2.3 km	MPC; JPL
658203	2017 OV_{31}	—	December 21, 2008	Mount Lemmon	Mount Lemmon Survey	·	1.7 km	MPC; JPL
658204	2017 OC_{32}	—	September 14, 2013	Haleakala	Pan-STARRS 1	HNS	820 m	MPC; JPL
658205	2017 OO_{32}	—	January 7, 2014	Mount Lemmon	Mount Lemmon Survey	EOS	1.3 km	MPC; JPL
658206	2017 OF_{33}	—	August 23, 2003	Palomar	NEAT	·	680 m	MPC; JPL
658207	2017 OF_{38}	—	September 4, 2010	Mount Lemmon	Mount Lemmon Survey	·	620 m	MPC; JPL
658208	2017 OM_{38}	—	August 23, 2003	Palomar	NEAT	·	2.1 km	MPC; JPL
658209	2017 OT_{39}	—	December 29, 2003	Kitt Peak	Spacewatch	·	1.9 km	MPC; JPL
658210	2017 ON_{41}	—	August 29, 2006	Kitt Peak	Spacewatch	·	2.1 km	MPC; JPL
658211	2017 OW_{41}	—	October 10, 2012	Mount Lemmon	Mount Lemmon Survey	EOS	1.6 km	MPC; JPL
658212	2017 OB_{43}	—	August 25, 2012	Kitt Peak	Spacewatch	EOS	1.6 km	MPC; JPL
658213	2017 OG_{44}	—	December 29, 2008	Mount Lemmon	Mount Lemmon Survey	·	1.9 km	MPC; JPL
658214	2017 OL_{45}	—	December 22, 2008	Kitt Peak	Spacewatch	EOS	1.5 km	MPC; JPL
658215	2017 OP_{46}	—	August 21, 2006	Kitt Peak	Spacewatch	·	2.6 km	MPC; JPL
658216	2017 OG_{48}	—	January 22, 2015	Haleakala	Pan-STARRS 1	·	1.7 km	MPC; JPL
658217	2017 OP_{49}	—	June 5, 2003	Kitt Peak	Spacewatch	·	830 m	MPC; JPL
658218	2017 OJ_{51}	—	September 22, 2012	Bergisch Gladbach	W. Bickel	EOS	1.3 km	MPC; JPL
658219	2017 OJ_{53}	—	July 6, 2013	Elena Remote	Oreshko, A.	·	850 m	MPC; JPL
658220	2017 OS_{53}	—	April 1, 2016	Haleakala	Pan-STARRS 1	·	1.4 km	MPC; JPL
658221	2017 OW_{53}	—	April 9, 2003	Palomar	NEAT	·	1.4 km	MPC; JPL
658222	2017 OK_{54}	—	March 10, 2016	Haleakala	Pan-STARRS 1	·	1.4 km	MPC; JPL
658223	2017 OR_{54}	—	April 30, 2016	Haleakala	Pan-STARRS 1	KOR	1.1 km	MPC; JPL
658224	2017 OH_{55}	—	October 8, 2008	Kitt Peak	Spacewatch	AGN	910 m	MPC; JPL
658225	2017 OM_{55}	—	July 30, 2017	Haleakala	Pan-STARRS 1	·	1.9 km	MPC; JPL
658226	2017 OX_{57}	—	July 30, 2008	Mount Lemmon	Mount Lemmon Survey	·	1.6 km	MPC; JPL
658227	2017 OF_{58}	—	April 10, 2005	Kitt Peak	Deep Ecliptic Survey	·	1.5 km	MPC; JPL
658228	2017 OF_{61}	—	September 26, 2008	Kitt Peak	Spacewatch	·	1.7 km	MPC; JPL
658229	2017 OD_{62}	—	January 19, 2015	Mount Lemmon	Mount Lemmon Survey	·	2.5 km	MPC; JPL
658230	2017 OG_{63}	—	April 14, 2016	Haleakala	Pan-STARRS 1	·	1.8 km	MPC; JPL
658231	2017 OM_{67}	—	February 4, 2006	Catalina	CSS	H	400 m	MPC; JPL
658232	2017 OR_{69}	—	July 30, 2017	Haleakala	Pan-STARRS 1	·	2.8 km	MPC; JPL
658233	2017 OC_{70}	—	July 30, 2017	Haleakala	Pan-STARRS 1	·	1.9 km	MPC; JPL
658234	2017 OM_{70}	—	July 30, 2017	Haleakala	Pan-STARRS 1	·	1.3 km	MPC; JPL
658235	2017 OD_{73}	—	October 13, 2006	Kitt Peak	Spacewatch	·	2.5 km	MPC; JPL
658236	2017 OM_{86}	—	July 29, 2017	Haleakala	Pan-STARRS 1	·	1.8 km	MPC; JPL
658237	2017 OO_{87}	—	April 18, 2015	Cerro Tololo-DECam	DECam	·	1.5 km	MPC; JPL
658238	2017 OH_{90}	—	April 13, 2015	Haleakala	Pan-STARRS 1	·	2.2 km	MPC; JPL
658239	2017 OJ_{90}	—	July 30, 2017	Haleakala	Pan-STARRS 1	·	1.4 km	MPC; JPL
658240	2017 OQ_{95}	—	January 16, 2015	Haleakala	Pan-STARRS 1	·	2.3 km	MPC; JPL
658241	2017 OV_{95}	—	July 30, 2017	Haleakala	Pan-STARRS 1	·	2.1 km	MPC; JPL
658242	2017 OC_{96}	—	July 25, 2017	Haleakala	Pan-STARRS 1	MAR	730 m	MPC; JPL
658243	2017 OK_{97}	—	July 25, 2017	Haleakala	Pan-STARRS 1	·	1.3 km	MPC; JPL
658244	2017 OW_{97}	—	July 25, 2017	Haleakala	Pan-STARRS 1	·	1.3 km	MPC; JPL
658245	2017 OY_{101}	—	July 26, 2017	Haleakala	Pan-STARRS 1	·	1.6 km	MPC; JPL
658246	2017 OS_{107}	—	July 26, 2017	Haleakala	Pan-STARRS 1	·	1.9 km	MPC; JPL
658247	2017 ON_{108}	—	April 5, 2016	Haleakala	Pan-STARRS 1	·	1.6 km	MPC; JPL
658248	2017 OS_{111}	—	July 25, 2017	Haleakala	Pan-STARRS 1	·	1.7 km	MPC; JPL
658249	2017 OW_{111}	—	July 30, 2017	Haleakala	Pan-STARRS 1	EOS	1.4 km	MPC; JPL
658250	2017 OP_{113}	—	July 26, 2017	Haleakala	Pan-STARRS 1	·	1.3 km	MPC; JPL
658251	2017 OQ_{113}	—	July 25, 2017	Haleakala	Pan-STARRS 1	·	2.3 km	MPC; JPL
658252	2017 OM_{122}	—	July 29, 2017	Haleakala	Pan-STARRS 1	EOS	1.4 km	MPC; JPL
658253	2017 OB_{130}	—	July 29, 2017	Haleakala	Pan-STARRS 1	TEL	970 m	MPC; JPL
658254	2017 OE_{139}	—	July 26, 2017	Haleakala	Pan-STARRS 1	TIR	2.1 km	MPC; JPL
658255	2017 OJ_{139}	—	July 25, 2017	Haleakala	Pan-STARRS 1	·	2.2 km	MPC; JPL
658256	2017 OY_{140}	—	July 29, 2017	Haleakala	Pan-STARRS 1	·	880 m	MPC; JPL
658257	2017 OE_{149}	—	January 10, 2010	Kitt Peak	Spacewatch	·	1.4 km	MPC; JPL
658258	2017 OP_{153}	—	July 30, 2017	Haleakala	Pan-STARRS 1	KOR	1.1 km	MPC; JPL
658259	2017 PC_{1}	—	September 10, 2007	Kitt Peak	Spacewatch	·	1.7 km	MPC; JPL
658260	2017 PN_{8}	—	August 1, 2017	Haleakala	Pan-STARRS 1	·	1.6 km	MPC; JPL
658261	2017 PP_{10}	—	February 3, 2009	Kitt Peak	Spacewatch	EOS	1.5 km	MPC; JPL
658262	2017 PY_{11}	—	October 26, 2013	Mount Lemmon	Mount Lemmon Survey	AGN	850 m	MPC; JPL
658263	2017 PN_{14}	—	September 24, 2012	Mount Lemmon	Mount Lemmon Survey	EOS	2.0 km	MPC; JPL
658264	2017 PN_{15}	—	March 22, 2015	Mount Lemmon	Mount Lemmon Survey	·	1.8 km	MPC; JPL
658265	2017 PE_{18}	—	August 1, 2017	Haleakala	Pan-STARRS 1	·	2.4 km	MPC; JPL
658266	2017 PS_{20}	—	November 9, 2008	Kitt Peak	Spacewatch	KOR	1.3 km	MPC; JPL
658267	2017 PL_{22}	—	September 19, 2008	Kitt Peak	Spacewatch	·	1.6 km	MPC; JPL
658268	2017 PL_{23}	—	November 21, 2008	Kitt Peak	Spacewatch	·	1.1 km	MPC; JPL
658269	2017 PV_{23}	—	September 22, 2008	Kitt Peak	Spacewatch	·	2.0 km	MPC; JPL
658270	2017 PF_{28}	—	July 1, 2017	Haleakala	Pan-STARRS 1	BRA	1.4 km	MPC; JPL
658271	2017 PL_{32}	—	July 1, 2017	Haleakala	Pan-STARRS 1	·	1.7 km	MPC; JPL
658272	2017 PT_{32}	—	November 27, 2013	Haleakala	Pan-STARRS 1	·	1.4 km	MPC; JPL
658273	2017 PK_{33}	—	July 26, 2017	Haleakala	Pan-STARRS 1	EOS	1.4 km	MPC; JPL
658274	2017 PB_{34}	—	August 17, 2006	Palomar	NEAT	TIR	2.6 km	MPC; JPL
658275	2017 PN_{35}	—	February 26, 2008	Mount Lemmon	Mount Lemmon Survey	·	680 m	MPC; JPL
658276	2017 PP_{35}	—	January 2, 2009	Mount Lemmon	Mount Lemmon Survey	·	1.3 km	MPC; JPL
658277	2017 PG_{36}	—	February 1, 2009	Mount Lemmon	Mount Lemmon Survey	·	2.1 km	MPC; JPL
658278	2017 PH_{36}	—	August 15, 2017	Haleakala	Pan-STARRS 1	·	1.5 km	MPC; JPL
658279	2017 PR_{36}	—	September 6, 2013	Kitt Peak	Spacewatch	·	1.2 km	MPC; JPL
658280	2017 PB_{37}	—	February 20, 2014	Mount Lemmon	Mount Lemmon Survey	TIR	2.3 km	MPC; JPL
658281	2017 PJ_{37}	—	September 4, 2008	Kitt Peak	Spacewatch	·	1.7 km	MPC; JPL
658282	2017 PK_{37}	—	January 17, 2016	Haleakala	Pan-STARRS 1	·	1.3 km	MPC; JPL
658283	2017 PP_{37}	—	July 15, 2004	Siding Spring	SSS	·	1.4 km	MPC; JPL
658284	2017 PR_{40}	—	September 26, 2008	Kitt Peak	Spacewatch	KOR	1.3 km	MPC; JPL
658285	2017 PA_{41}	—	January 16, 2015	Haleakala	Pan-STARRS 1	·	1.5 km	MPC; JPL
658286	2017 PL_{41}	—	December 15, 2001	Socorro	LINEAR	·	2.9 km	MPC; JPL
658287	2017 PU_{41}	—	August 4, 2017	Haleakala	Pan-STARRS 1	·	1.7 km	MPC; JPL
658288	2017 PA_{42}	—	August 6, 2017	Haleakala	Pan-STARRS 1	LIX	2.7 km	MPC; JPL
658289	2017 PC_{42}	—	September 24, 2006	Kitt Peak	Spacewatch	·	2.2 km	MPC; JPL
658290	2017 PQ_{42}	—	April 19, 2015	Cerro Tololo-DECam	DECam	·	1.7 km	MPC; JPL
658291	2017 PD_{43}	—	August 3, 2017	Haleakala	Pan-STARRS 1	·	2.9 km	MPC; JPL
658292	2017 PQ_{47}	—	July 25, 2006	Palomar	NEAT	·	1.7 km	MPC; JPL
658293	2017 PA_{52}	—	April 18, 2015	Cerro Tololo-DECam	DECam	·	1.4 km	MPC; JPL
658294	2017 PN_{53}	—	August 3, 2017	Haleakala	Pan-STARRS 1	·	2.7 km	MPC; JPL
658295	2017 PX_{53}	—	August 3, 2017	Haleakala	Pan-STARRS 1	·	2.8 km	MPC; JPL
658296	2017 PY_{53}	—	August 1, 2017	Haleakala	Pan-STARRS 1	·	2.2 km	MPC; JPL
658297	2017 PP_{54}	—	August 1, 2017	Haleakala	Pan-STARRS 1	·	2.3 km	MPC; JPL
658298	2017 PY_{56}	—	August 3, 2017	Haleakala	Pan-STARRS 1	·	1.7 km	MPC; JPL
658299	2017 PX_{57}	—	August 14, 2017	Haleakala	Pan-STARRS 1	·	1.7 km	MPC; JPL
658300	2017 PU_{59}	—	August 15, 2017	Haleakala	Pan-STARRS 1	·	2.6 km	MPC; JPL

== 658301–658400 ==
back to top

Designation			Discovery			Properties		Ref
Permanent	Provisional	Named after	Date	Site	Discoverer(s)	Category	Diam.	Ref
658301	2017 PX_{59}	—	August 1, 2017	Haleakala	Pan-STARRS 1	·	1.2 km	MPC; JPL
658302	2017 PO_{61}	—	August 1, 2017	Haleakala	Pan-STARRS 1	·	2.1 km	MPC; JPL
658303	2017 PB_{64}	—	August 1, 2017	Haleakala	Pan-STARRS 1	EOS	1.6 km	MPC; JPL
658304	2017 PQ_{67}	—	August 3, 2017	Haleakala	Pan-STARRS 1	·	2.6 km	MPC; JPL
658305	2017 PW_{67}	—	August 6, 2017	Haleakala	Pan-STARRS 1	·	2.2 km	MPC; JPL
658306	2017 PN_{71}	—	September 7, 2008	Mount Lemmon	Mount Lemmon Survey	·	1.4 km	MPC; JPL
658307	2017 QF_{9}	—	May 5, 2016	Haleakala	Pan-STARRS 1	·	2.4 km	MPC; JPL
658308	2017 QQ_{9}	—	January 23, 2006	Mount Lemmon	Mount Lemmon Survey	·	1.5 km	MPC; JPL
658309	2017 QB_{12}	—	November 26, 2014	Haleakala	Pan-STARRS 1	·	730 m	MPC; JPL
658310	2017 QK_{13}	—	January 20, 2015	Haleakala	Pan-STARRS 1	·	1.6 km	MPC; JPL
658311	2017 QX_{13}	—	March 29, 2012	Haleakala	Pan-STARRS 1	·	1.4 km	MPC; JPL
658312	2017 QL_{20}	—	July 26, 2017	Haleakala	Pan-STARRS 1	AGN	950 m	MPC; JPL
658313	2017 QD_{22}	—	September 7, 2008	Mount Lemmon	Mount Lemmon Survey	AST	1.6 km	MPC; JPL
658314	2017 QV_{23}	—	September 13, 2007	Catalina	CSS	·	1.7 km	MPC; JPL
658315	2017 QP_{27}	—	January 9, 2014	Mount Lemmon	Mount Lemmon Survey	(8737)	2.5 km	MPC; JPL
658316	2017 QG_{28}	—	June 29, 2017	Mount Lemmon	Mount Lemmon Survey	·	2.8 km	MPC; JPL
658317	2017 QN_{31}	—	May 25, 2006	Mount Lemmon	Mount Lemmon Survey	·	2.2 km	MPC; JPL
658318	2017 QP_{31}	—	September 5, 2008	Kitt Peak	Spacewatch	·	1.9 km	MPC; JPL
658319	2017 QD_{36}	—	January 9, 2011	XuYi	PMO NEO Survey Program	H	530 m	MPC; JPL
658320	2017 QG_{37}	—	September 13, 2012	ESA OGS	ESA OGS	·	2.1 km	MPC; JPL
658321	2017 QS_{38}	—	October 28, 2013	Mount Lemmon	Mount Lemmon Survey	EOS	1.7 km	MPC; JPL
658322	2017 QD_{40}	—	December 29, 2008	Kitt Peak	Spacewatch	·	1.4 km	MPC; JPL
658323	2017 QU_{41}	—	August 16, 2017	Haleakala	Pan-STARRS 1	·	1.5 km	MPC; JPL
658324	2017 QB_{42}	—	August 31, 2005	Kitt Peak	Spacewatch	·	820 m	MPC; JPL
658325	2017 QY_{43}	—	August 26, 2012	Kitt Peak	Spacewatch	EMA	2.2 km	MPC; JPL
658326	2017 QS_{44}	—	March 27, 2011	Mount Lemmon	Mount Lemmon Survey	·	1.6 km	MPC; JPL
658327	2017 QO_{45}	—	October 11, 2004	Kitt Peak	Spacewatch	·	1.4 km	MPC; JPL
658328	2017 QW_{45}	—	February 25, 2006	Kitt Peak	Spacewatch	·	1.4 km	MPC; JPL
658329	2017 QX_{47}	—	November 9, 2013	Haleakala	Pan-STARRS 1	KOR	1.2 km	MPC; JPL
658330	2017 QV_{49}	—	January 13, 2015	Haleakala	Pan-STARRS 1	·	1.1 km	MPC; JPL
658331	2017 QS_{51}	—	June 5, 2016	Haleakala	Pan-STARRS 1	·	2.6 km	MPC; JPL
658332	2017 QY_{51}	—	August 19, 2006	Kitt Peak	Spacewatch	·	2.5 km	MPC; JPL
658333	2017 QA_{52}	—	January 20, 2015	Haleakala	Pan-STARRS 1	HOF	2.4 km	MPC; JPL
658334	2017 QS_{52}	—	November 19, 2009	Mount Lemmon	Mount Lemmon Survey	·	1.5 km	MPC; JPL
658335	2017 QW_{53}	—	October 7, 2013	Kitt Peak	Spacewatch	AGN	1.0 km	MPC; JPL
658336	2017 QE_{54}	—	March 25, 2007	Mount Lemmon	Mount Lemmon Survey	·	1.7 km	MPC; JPL
658337	2017 QN_{54}	—	September 3, 2008	Kitt Peak	Spacewatch	AGN	1.1 km	MPC; JPL
658338	2017 QV_{54}	—	July 15, 2013	Haleakala	Pan-STARRS 1	·	1.1 km	MPC; JPL
658339	2017 QN_{55}	—	September 13, 2007	Mount Lemmon	Mount Lemmon Survey	EOS	1.6 km	MPC; JPL
658340	2017 QP_{56}	—	October 24, 2013	Mount Lemmon	Mount Lemmon Survey	·	1.8 km	MPC; JPL
658341	2017 QU_{56}	—	September 5, 2008	Kitt Peak	Spacewatch	·	2.0 km	MPC; JPL
658342	2017 QM_{57}	—	November 14, 1998	Kitt Peak	Spacewatch	MAS	730 m	MPC; JPL
658343	2017 QG_{58}	—	May 30, 2011	Haleakala	Pan-STARRS 1	·	1.6 km	MPC; JPL
658344	2017 QH_{58}	—	September 19, 2010	Kitt Peak	Spacewatch	·	1.3 km	MPC; JPL
658345	2017 QK_{58}	—	April 2, 2016	Haleakala	Pan-STARRS 1	·	2.6 km	MPC; JPL
658346	2017 QR_{58}	—	June 3, 2016	Haleakala	Pan-STARRS 1	BRA	1.1 km	MPC; JPL
658347	2017 QT_{58}	—	January 27, 2011	Mount Lemmon	Mount Lemmon Survey	·	850 m	MPC; JPL
658348	2017 QH_{60}	—	November 28, 2013	Mount Lemmon	Mount Lemmon Survey	·	1.4 km	MPC; JPL
658349	2017 QY_{60}	—	August 22, 2017	XuYi	PMO NEO Survey Program	·	1.9 km	MPC; JPL
658350	2017 QL_{63}	—	July 25, 2017	Haleakala	Pan-STARRS 1	·	1.7 km	MPC; JPL
658351	2017 QP_{64}	—	December 31, 2008	Kitt Peak	Spacewatch	·	1.6 km	MPC; JPL
658352	2017 QV_{64}	—	December 27, 2013	Kitt Peak	Spacewatch	·	2.4 km	MPC; JPL
658353	2017 QN_{66}	—	March 23, 2003	Kitt Peak	Spacewatch	·	2.4 km	MPC; JPL
658354	2017 QP_{67}	—	May 20, 2015	Cerro Tololo-DECam	DECam	·	2.3 km	MPC; JPL
658355	2017 QD_{69}	—	August 27, 2017	ATLAS-HKO, Haleaka	ATLAS	·	2.4 km	MPC; JPL
658356	2017 QU_{76}	—	March 22, 2015	Mount Lemmon	Mount Lemmon Survey	·	2.1 km	MPC; JPL
658357	2017 QV_{78}	—	August 31, 2017	Mount Lemmon	Mount Lemmon Survey	·	2.3 km	MPC; JPL
658358	2017 QH_{80}	—	August 31, 2017	Mount Lemmon	Mount Lemmon Survey	·	2.2 km	MPC; JPL
658359	2017 QT_{87}	—	April 18, 2015	Cerro Tololo-DECam	DECam	·	2.0 km	MPC; JPL
658360	2017 QV_{87}	—	August 22, 2017	Haleakala	Pan-STARRS 1	·	1.7 km	MPC; JPL
658361	2017 QK_{91}	—	August 17, 2017	Haleakala	Pan-STARRS 1	KOR	1.1 km	MPC; JPL
658362	2017 QC_{92}	—	August 24, 2017	Haleakala	Pan-STARRS 1	·	1.3 km	MPC; JPL
658363	2017 QN_{92}	—	August 31, 2017	Haleakala	Pan-STARRS 1	·	1.7 km	MPC; JPL
658364	2017 QP_{92}	—	August 31, 2017	Haleakala	Pan-STARRS 1	HYG	2.0 km	MPC; JPL
658365	2017 QR_{92}	—	August 22, 2017	Haleakala	Pan-STARRS 1	LIX	2.3 km	MPC; JPL
658366	2017 QV_{93}	—	April 17, 2015	Mount Lemmon	Mount Lemmon Survey	·	2.4 km	MPC; JPL
658367	2017 QZ_{93}	—	August 18, 2017	Haleakala	Pan-STARRS 1	·	1.9 km	MPC; JPL
658368	2017 QC_{95}	—	August 17, 2017	Haleakala	Pan-STARRS 1	·	2.0 km	MPC; JPL
658369	2017 QC_{99}	—	August 31, 2017	Mount Lemmon	Mount Lemmon Survey	EOS	1.4 km	MPC; JPL
658370	2017 QV_{101}	—	April 9, 2015	Mount Lemmon	Mount Lemmon Survey	EOS	1.3 km	MPC; JPL
658371	2017 QY_{101}	—	August 30, 2017	Haleakala	Pan-STARRS 1	·	1.5 km	MPC; JPL
658372	2017 QW_{103}	—	August 24, 2017	Haleakala	Pan-STARRS 1	KOR	1.1 km	MPC; JPL
658373	2017 QQ_{107}	—	August 31, 2017	Haleakala	Pan-STARRS 1	·	1.4 km	MPC; JPL
658374	2017 QJ_{108}	—	August 31, 2017	Haleakala	Pan-STARRS 1	VER	2.1 km	MPC; JPL
658375	2017 QJ_{109}	—	August 31, 2017	Haleakala	Pan-STARRS 1	·	2.3 km	MPC; JPL
658376	2017 QP_{109}	—	August 23, 2017	Haleakala	Pan-STARRS 1	EOS	1.6 km	MPC; JPL
658377	2017 QU_{113}	—	August 16, 2006	Palomar	NEAT	·	1.8 km	MPC; JPL
658378	2017 QP_{116}	—	August 24, 2017	Haleakala	Pan-STARRS 1	THM	2.0 km	MPC; JPL
658379	2017 QT_{117}	—	August 24, 2017	Haleakala	Pan-STARRS 1	·	2.2 km	MPC; JPL
658380	2017 QV_{117}	—	August 24, 2017	Haleakala	Pan-STARRS 1	·	2.2 km	MPC; JPL
658381	2017 QU_{118}	—	August 16, 2017	Haleakala	Pan-STARRS 1	·	1.7 km	MPC; JPL
658382	2017 QG_{119}	—	August 20, 2017	Haleakala	Pan-STARRS 1	·	2.2 km	MPC; JPL
658383	2017 QC_{122}	—	August 31, 2017	Mount Lemmon	Mount Lemmon Survey	·	2.0 km	MPC; JPL
658384	2017 QF_{122}	—	August 18, 2017	Haleakala	Pan-STARRS 1	·	1.7 km	MPC; JPL
658385	2017 QB_{123}	—	March 10, 2015	Mount Lemmon	Mount Lemmon Survey	·	1.4 km	MPC; JPL
658386	2017 QC_{123}	—	August 17, 2017	Haleakala	Pan-STARRS 1	·	1.4 km	MPC; JPL
658387	2017 QR_{123}	—	August 24, 2017	Haleakala	Pan-STARRS 1	VER	1.9 km	MPC; JPL
658388	2017 QK_{124}	—	August 31, 2017	Haleakala	Pan-STARRS 1	KOR	1.0 km	MPC; JPL
658389	2017 QM_{124}	—	August 31, 2017	Haleakala	Pan-STARRS 1	·	2.3 km	MPC; JPL
658390	2017 QD_{128}	—	January 27, 2015	Haleakala	Pan-STARRS 1	·	1.7 km	MPC; JPL
658391	2017 QE_{128}	—	February 2, 2006	Bergisch Gladbach	W. Bickel	AGN	940 m	MPC; JPL
658392	2017 QF_{134}	—	August 16, 2017	Haleakala	Pan-STARRS 1	·	1.9 km	MPC; JPL
658393	2017 QE_{135}	—	August 24, 2017	Haleakala	Pan-STARRS 1	·	3.0 km	MPC; JPL
658394	2017 QA_{142}	—	August 31, 2017	Mount Lemmon	Mount Lemmon Survey	·	3.0 km	MPC; JPL
658395	2017 QX_{144}	—	August 31, 2017	Mount Lemmon	Mount Lemmon Survey	EOS	1.6 km	MPC; JPL
658396	2017 QT_{145}	—	April 17, 2015	Cerro Tololo-DECam	DECam	EOS	1.4 km	MPC; JPL
658397	2017 QN_{183}	—	August 23, 2017	Haleakala	Pan-STARRS 1	EOS	1.6 km	MPC; JPL
658398 Lufonds	2017 RE_{3}	Lufonds	July 29, 2008	Baldone	K. Černis, I. Eglītis	·	1.5 km	MPC; JPL
658399	2017 RJ_{4}	—	October 3, 2013	Haleakala	Pan-STARRS 1	·	1.4 km	MPC; JPL
658400	2017 RH_{7}	—	September 3, 2008	Kitt Peak	Spacewatch	·	1.6 km	MPC; JPL

== 658401–658500 ==
back to top

Designation			Discovery			Properties		Ref
Permanent	Provisional	Named after	Date	Site	Discoverer(s)	Category	Diam.	Ref
658401	2017 RQ_{8}	—	October 10, 2012	Haleakala	Pan-STARRS 1	·	2.5 km	MPC; JPL
658402	2017 RJ_{10}	—	September 14, 2006	Kitt Peak	Spacewatch	·	800 m	MPC; JPL
658403	2017 RK_{17}	—	May 27, 2016	Haleakala	Pan-STARRS 1	·	2.5 km	MPC; JPL
658404	2017 RJ_{18}	—	February 27, 2012	Haleakala	Pan-STARRS 1	·	1.3 km	MPC; JPL
658405	2017 RO_{18}	—	September 19, 2011	Mount Lemmon	Mount Lemmon Survey	(69559)	2.7 km	MPC; JPL
658406	2017 RR_{19}	—	August 31, 2017	Mount Lemmon	Mount Lemmon Survey	·	1.7 km	MPC; JPL
658407	2017 RA_{20}	—	January 13, 2008	Kitt Peak	Spacewatch	·	2.5 km	MPC; JPL
658408	2017 RO_{21}	—	November 9, 2013	Kitt Peak	Spacewatch	·	1.4 km	MPC; JPL
658409	2017 RY_{21}	—	February 12, 2011	Mount Lemmon	Mount Lemmon Survey	·	1.6 km	MPC; JPL
658410	2017 RB_{22}	—	September 21, 2007	XuYi	PMO NEO Survey Program	·	1.9 km	MPC; JPL
658411	2017 RN_{22}	—	September 5, 2008	Kitt Peak	Spacewatch	·	1.9 km	MPC; JPL
658412	2017 RO_{22}	—	February 16, 2015	Haleakala	Pan-STARRS 1	·	1.9 km	MPC; JPL
658413	2017 RA_{23}	—	October 21, 2012	Kitt Peak	Spacewatch	·	1.9 km	MPC; JPL
658414	2017 RY_{23}	—	June 7, 2016	Haleakala	Pan-STARRS 1	EOS	1.6 km	MPC; JPL
658415	2017 RM_{24}	—	January 21, 2002	Kitt Peak	Spacewatch	·	2.9 km	MPC; JPL
658416	2017 RD_{25}	—	October 8, 2012	Haleakala	Pan-STARRS 1	·	1.5 km	MPC; JPL
658417	2017 RQ_{25}	—	October 10, 1999	Kitt Peak	Spacewatch	·	1.6 km	MPC; JPL
658418	2017 RT_{26}	—	October 22, 2012	Haleakala	Pan-STARRS 1	·	2.3 km	MPC; JPL
658419	2017 RK_{28}	—	September 13, 2017	Haleakala	Pan-STARRS 1	·	2.5 km	MPC; JPL
658420	2017 RZ_{28}	—	August 27, 2006	Kitt Peak	Spacewatch	·	2.3 km	MPC; JPL
658421	2017 RS_{29}	—	September 28, 2008	Mount Lemmon	Mount Lemmon Survey	·	1.6 km	MPC; JPL
658422	2017 RR_{30}	—	January 1, 2014	Kitt Peak	Spacewatch	(31811)	2.1 km	MPC; JPL
658423	2017 RB_{31}	—	August 19, 2006	Kitt Peak	Spacewatch	·	2.3 km	MPC; JPL
658424	2017 RK_{33}	—	November 27, 2013	Haleakala	Pan-STARRS 1	·	1.7 km	MPC; JPL
658425	2017 RA_{34}	—	September 22, 2001	Kitt Peak	Spacewatch	EOS	1.5 km	MPC; JPL
658426	2017 RK_{34}	—	April 19, 2002	Kitt Peak	Spacewatch	·	1.7 km	MPC; JPL
658427	2017 RY_{35}	—	August 1, 2017	Haleakala	Pan-STARRS 1	·	1.3 km	MPC; JPL
658428	2017 RA_{39}	—	October 8, 2008	Mount Lemmon	Mount Lemmon Survey	MRX	830 m	MPC; JPL
658429	2017 RW_{46}	—	November 10, 2009	Kitt Peak	Spacewatch	·	1.5 km	MPC; JPL
658430	2017 RJ_{47}	—	February 16, 2015	Haleakala	Pan-STARRS 1	·	1.4 km	MPC; JPL
658431	2017 RS_{47}	—	October 10, 2008	Kitt Peak	Spacewatch	AGN	940 m	MPC; JPL
658432	2017 RX_{47}	—	December 31, 2013	Mount Lemmon	Mount Lemmon Survey	EOS	1.6 km	MPC; JPL
658433	2017 RU_{48}	—	September 15, 2006	Kitt Peak	Spacewatch	THM	1.6 km	MPC; JPL
658434	2017 RH_{50}	—	May 25, 2006	Mauna Kea	P. A. Wiegert	KOR	1.4 km	MPC; JPL
658435	2017 RU_{52}	—	February 10, 2014	Haleakala	Pan-STARRS 1	·	1.2 km	MPC; JPL
658436	2017 RG_{53}	—	September 14, 2007	Kitt Peak	Spacewatch	KOR	1.2 km	MPC; JPL
658437	2017 RQ_{55}	—	October 28, 2008	Kitt Peak	Spacewatch	·	1.4 km	MPC; JPL
658438	2017 RO_{58}	—	February 16, 2015	Haleakala	Pan-STARRS 1	·	1.5 km	MPC; JPL
658439	2017 RK_{59}	—	October 25, 2001	Apache Point	SDSS Collaboration	EOS	1.4 km	MPC; JPL
658440	2017 RU_{60}	—	August 24, 2017	Haleakala	Pan-STARRS 1	·	1.1 km	MPC; JPL
658441	2017 RJ_{61}	—	September 19, 2001	Kitt Peak	Spacewatch	EOS	1.7 km	MPC; JPL
658442	2017 RO_{61}	—	August 31, 2017	Haleakala	Pan-STARRS 1	AGN	890 m	MPC; JPL
658443	2017 RA_{62}	—	January 20, 2015	Haleakala	Pan-STARRS 1	·	1.6 km	MPC; JPL
658444	2017 RU_{62}	—	July 28, 2011	Haleakala	Pan-STARRS 1	·	2.5 km	MPC; JPL
658445	2017 RB_{63}	—	January 10, 2010	Kitt Peak	Spacewatch	·	1.8 km	MPC; JPL
658446	2017 RJ_{63}	—	May 31, 2011	Mount Lemmon	Mount Lemmon Survey	·	1.6 km	MPC; JPL
658447	2017 RO_{63}	—	February 18, 2015	Kitt Peak	Research and Education Collaborative Occultation Network	KOR	1.1 km	MPC; JPL
658448	2017 RP_{63}	—	November 1, 2013	Mount Lemmon	Mount Lemmon Survey	·	1.3 km	MPC; JPL
658449	2017 RR_{66}	—	March 4, 2005	Mount Lemmon	Mount Lemmon Survey	·	1.5 km	MPC; JPL
658450	2017 RW_{67}	—	April 12, 2016	Haleakala	Pan-STARRS 1	·	2.4 km	MPC; JPL
658451	2017 RC_{73}	—	October 22, 1995	Kitt Peak	Spacewatch	·	1.4 km	MPC; JPL
658452	2017 RZ_{73}	—	September 10, 2004	Kitt Peak	Spacewatch	·	1.1 km	MPC; JPL
658453	2017 RF_{74}	—	February 18, 2015	Kitt Peak	Research and Education Collaborative Occultation Network	·	1.6 km	MPC; JPL
658454	2017 RO_{74}	—	October 20, 2012	Mount Lemmon	Mount Lemmon Survey	HYG	2.0 km	MPC; JPL
658455	2017 RY_{75}	—	February 27, 2006	Kitt Peak	Spacewatch	·	2.1 km	MPC; JPL
658456	2017 RN_{77}	—	March 14, 2016	Mount Lemmon	Mount Lemmon Survey	·	1.3 km	MPC; JPL
658457	2017 RY_{83}	—	November 7, 2012	Haleakala	Pan-STARRS 1	·	1.9 km	MPC; JPL
658458	2017 RW_{84}	—	September 22, 2012	Kitt Peak	Spacewatch	·	1.2 km	MPC; JPL
658459	2017 RY_{84}	—	October 16, 2012	Mount Lemmon	Mount Lemmon Survey	EOS	1.3 km	MPC; JPL
658460	2017 RH_{85}	—	September 21, 2003	Kitt Peak	Spacewatch	·	1.5 km	MPC; JPL
658461	2017 RU_{86}	—	March 20, 2015	Haleakala	Pan-STARRS 1	·	2.2 km	MPC; JPL
658462	2017 RN_{87}	—	September 28, 2001	Palomar	NEAT	·	2.4 km	MPC; JPL
658463	2017 RD_{88}	—	September 15, 2017	Haleakala	Pan-STARRS 1	THM	1.7 km	MPC; JPL
658464	2017 RT_{88}	—	April 18, 2015	Cerro Tololo-DECam	DECam	·	2.5 km	MPC; JPL
658465	2017 RK_{89}	—	August 2, 2011	Haleakala	Pan-STARRS 1	·	2.0 km	MPC; JPL
658466	2017 RE_{90}	—	September 19, 2006	Kitt Peak	Spacewatch	·	2.3 km	MPC; JPL
658467	2017 RN_{90}	—	October 16, 2007	Mount Lemmon	Mount Lemmon Survey	KOR	1.2 km	MPC; JPL
658468	2017 RA_{91}	—	September 15, 2017	Haleakala	Pan-STARRS 1	EMA	1.8 km	MPC; JPL
658469	2017 RX_{91}	—	October 6, 2008	Mount Lemmon	Mount Lemmon Survey	·	1.6 km	MPC; JPL
658470	2017 RP_{93}	—	June 5, 2016	Haleakala	Pan-STARRS 1	HOF	2.0 km	MPC; JPL
658471	2017 RX_{95}	—	September 27, 2006	Kitt Peak	Spacewatch	·	2.0 km	MPC; JPL
658472	2017 RS_{96}	—	March 23, 2015	Haleakala	Pan-STARRS 1	EOS	1.2 km	MPC; JPL
658473	2017 RM_{97}	—	October 8, 2007	Mount Lemmon	Mount Lemmon Survey	KOR	1.1 km	MPC; JPL
658474	2017 RD_{99}	—	March 24, 2015	Mount Lemmon	Mount Lemmon Survey	·	1.3 km	MPC; JPL
658475	2017 RY_{99}	—	January 22, 2015	Haleakala	Pan-STARRS 1	·	1.6 km	MPC; JPL
658476	2017 RA_{100}	—	April 12, 2005	Kitt Peak	Deep Ecliptic Survey	KOR	1.1 km	MPC; JPL
658477	2017 RM_{102}	—	October 10, 2007	Mount Lemmon	Mount Lemmon Survey	KOR	1.1 km	MPC; JPL
658478	2017 RO_{102}	—	February 26, 2014	Haleakala	Pan-STARRS 1	·	2.5 km	MPC; JPL
658479	2017 RZ_{103}	—	October 17, 2006	Catalina	CSS	LIX	2.7 km	MPC; JPL
658480	2017 RB_{104}	—	August 6, 2012	Haleakala	Pan-STARRS 1	·	2.4 km	MPC; JPL
658481	2017 RE_{104}	—	July 2, 2011	Mount Lemmon	Mount Lemmon Survey	·	3.2 km	MPC; JPL
658482	2017 RK_{104}	—	September 5, 2013	Catalina	CSS	BAR	1.2 km	MPC; JPL
658483	2017 RP_{104}	—	October 18, 2012	Mount Lemmon	Mount Lemmon Survey	·	2.2 km	MPC; JPL
658484	2017 RE_{105}	—	September 11, 2017	Haleakala	Pan-STARRS 1	·	2.2 km	MPC; JPL
658485	2017 RR_{105}	—	March 18, 2015	Haleakala	Pan-STARRS 1	·	2.1 km	MPC; JPL
658486	2017 RA_{106}	—	October 11, 2012	Pla D'Arguines	R. Ferrando, Ferrando, M.	·	2.5 km	MPC; JPL
658487	2017 RX_{106}	—	October 8, 2012	Haleakala	Pan-STARRS 1	·	1.4 km	MPC; JPL
658488	2017 RB_{107}	—	April 18, 2015	Cerro Tololo-DECam	DECam	·	2.2 km	MPC; JPL
658489	2017 RL_{107}	—	August 22, 2006	Cerro Tololo	Deep Ecliptic Survey	·	2.2 km	MPC; JPL
658490	2017 RX_{107}	—	July 25, 2011	Haleakala	Pan-STARRS 1	EOS	1.5 km	MPC; JPL
658491	2017 RF_{108}	—	January 13, 2015	Haleakala	Pan-STARRS 1	·	1.5 km	MPC; JPL
658492	2017 RH_{108}	—	September 11, 2017	Haleakala	Pan-STARRS 1	EOS	1.6 km	MPC; JPL
658493	2017 RL_{108}	—	November 9, 2007	Catalina	CSS	·	2.1 km	MPC; JPL
658494	2017 RM_{108}	—	April 4, 2016	Haleakala	Pan-STARRS 1	JUN	880 m	MPC; JPL
658495	2017 RK_{109}	—	July 16, 2004	Cerro Tololo	Deep Ecliptic Survey	EUN	840 m	MPC; JPL
658496	2017 RW_{110}	—	April 19, 2015	Cerro Tololo-DECam	DECam	·	1.5 km	MPC; JPL
658497	2017 RB_{120}	—	September 2, 2017	Haleakala	Pan-STARRS 1	·	1.9 km	MPC; JPL
658498	2017 RG_{120}	—	September 15, 2017	Haleakala	Pan-STARRS 1	·	1.8 km	MPC; JPL
658499	2017 RE_{123}	—	January 1, 2008	Kitt Peak	Spacewatch	·	2.4 km	MPC; JPL
658500	2017 RE_{124}	—	April 18, 2015	Cerro Tololo-DECam	DECam	·	2.3 km	MPC; JPL

== 658501–658600 ==
back to top

Designation			Discovery			Properties		Ref
Permanent	Provisional	Named after	Date	Site	Discoverer(s)	Category	Diam.	Ref
658501	2017 RO_{125}	—	September 1, 2017	Mount Lemmon	Mount Lemmon Survey	·	1.8 km	MPC; JPL
658502	2017 RH_{126}	—	November 10, 2013	Kitt Peak	Spacewatch	HOF	2.0 km	MPC; JPL
658503	2017 RC_{131}	—	September 2, 2017	Haleakala	Pan-STARRS 1	EOS	1.5 km	MPC; JPL
658504	2017 RK_{131}	—	January 28, 2015	Haleakala	Pan-STARRS 1	EOS	1.3 km	MPC; JPL
658505	2017 RM_{131}	—	September 13, 2017	Haleakala	Pan-STARRS 1	·	2.5 km	MPC; JPL
658506	2017 RB_{132}	—	September 2, 2017	Mount Lemmon	Mount Lemmon Survey	NAE	1.5 km	MPC; JPL
658507	2017 RE_{132}	—	September 12, 2017	Haleakala	Pan-STARRS 1	·	2.2 km	MPC; JPL
658508	2017 RW_{132}	—	September 11, 2017	Haleakala	Pan-STARRS 1	TIR	1.8 km	MPC; JPL
658509	2017 RG_{133}	—	September 15, 2017	Haleakala	Pan-STARRS 1	·	2.0 km	MPC; JPL
658510	2017 RT_{137}	—	February 24, 2015	Haleakala	Pan-STARRS 1	HOF	2.1 km	MPC; JPL
658511	2017 RB_{144}	—	January 1, 2014	Kitt Peak	Spacewatch	EMA	2.4 km	MPC; JPL
658512	2017 RD_{145}	—	September 2, 2017	Haleakala	Pan-STARRS 1	·	2.3 km	MPC; JPL
658513	2017 RT_{150}	—	September 14, 2017	Haleakala	Pan-STARRS 1	TEL	1.1 km	MPC; JPL
658514	2017 RB_{153}	—	September 2, 2017	Haleakala	Pan-STARRS 1	·	1.6 km	MPC; JPL
658515	2017 RK_{153}	—	September 15, 2017	Haleakala	Pan-STARRS 1	·	1.4 km	MPC; JPL
658516	2017 RK_{162}	—	September 8, 2017	Haleakala	Pan-STARRS 1	·	2.0 km	MPC; JPL
658517	2017 SZ_{2}	—	January 14, 2016	Haleakala	Pan-STARRS 1	H	500 m	MPC; JPL
658518	2017 SH_{3}	—	September 27, 2006	Kitt Peak	Spacewatch	·	2.1 km	MPC; JPL
658519	2017 SY_{4}	—	September 16, 2017	Haleakala	Pan-STARRS 1	·	1.5 km	MPC; JPL
658520	2017 ST_{6}	—	October 21, 1995	Kitt Peak	Spacewatch	URS	2.7 km	MPC; JPL
658521	2017 SN_{7}	—	March 18, 2009	Kitt Peak	Spacewatch	·	2.8 km	MPC; JPL
658522	2017 SO_{7}	—	September 26, 2003	Apache Point	SDSS Collaboration	GEF	1.3 km	MPC; JPL
658523	2017 SF_{9}	—	September 18, 2012	Catalina	CSS	·	1.5 km	MPC; JPL
658524	2017 SC_{17}	—	December 31, 2015	Haleakala	Pan-STARRS 1	H	480 m	MPC; JPL
658525	2017 SX_{18}	—	September 26, 2017	Haleakala	Pan-STARRS 1	T_{j} (2.98)	2.5 km	MPC; JPL
658526	2017 SK_{22}	—	April 18, 2015	Cerro Tololo-DECam	DECam	·	2.0 km	MPC; JPL
658527	2017 SD_{24}	—	September 15, 2004	Kitt Peak	Spacewatch	H	440 m	MPC; JPL
658528	2017 SN_{25}	—	October 10, 2012	Mount Lemmon	Mount Lemmon Survey	·	1.5 km	MPC; JPL
658529	2017 SC_{27}	—	November 9, 2013	Haleakala	Pan-STARRS 1	·	1.7 km	MPC; JPL
658530	2017 SP_{27}	—	August 24, 2017	Haleakala	Pan-STARRS 1	VER	2.0 km	MPC; JPL
658531	2017 SH_{29}	—	September 18, 2006	Catalina	CSS	·	1.7 km	MPC; JPL
658532	2017 SR_{29}	—	September 7, 2016	Haleakala	Pan-STARRS 1	·	3.2 km	MPC; JPL
658533	2017 SU_{37}	—	September 21, 2017	Haleakala	Pan-STARRS 1	·	1.9 km	MPC; JPL
658534	2017 SW_{37}	—	October 20, 2006	Kitt Peak	Spacewatch	·	2.5 km	MPC; JPL
658535	2017 SU_{38}	—	March 20, 2015	Haleakala	Pan-STARRS 1	·	2.2 km	MPC; JPL
658536	2017 SE_{39}	—	September 18, 2017	Catalina	CSS	T_{j} (2.97)	2.5 km	MPC; JPL
658537	2017 SP_{39}	—	January 10, 2008	Mount Lemmon	Mount Lemmon Survey	TIR	1.8 km	MPC; JPL
658538	2017 SS_{40}	—	September 2, 2017	Haleakala	Pan-STARRS 1	·	1.3 km	MPC; JPL
658539	2017 ST_{42}	—	December 11, 2012	Mount Lemmon	Mount Lemmon Survey	·	3.0 km	MPC; JPL
658540	2017 SH_{43}	—	September 21, 2006	Anderson Mesa	LONEOS	·	2.6 km	MPC; JPL
658541	2017 SS_{43}	—	January 20, 2015	Haleakala	Pan-STARRS 1	·	1.3 km	MPC; JPL
658542	2017 SH_{45}	—	April 19, 2015	Cerro Tololo-DECam	DECam	·	1.7 km	MPC; JPL
658543	2017 SS_{46}	—	August 19, 2006	Kitt Peak	Spacewatch	·	1.8 km	MPC; JPL
658544	2017 SZ_{46}	—	August 16, 2017	Haleakala	Pan-STARRS 1	·	1.6 km	MPC; JPL
658545	2017 SC_{47}	—	December 11, 2013	Haleakala	Pan-STARRS 1	·	1.3 km	MPC; JPL
658546	2017 SL_{52}	—	September 26, 2006	Mount Lemmon	Mount Lemmon Survey	EOS	1.3 km	MPC; JPL
658547	2017 SP_{52}	—	September 9, 2007	Kitt Peak	Spacewatch	·	1.6 km	MPC; JPL
658548	2017 SG_{53}	—	December 16, 2007	Mount Lemmon	Mount Lemmon Survey	·	3.1 km	MPC; JPL
658549	2017 ST_{53}	—	August 22, 2006	Cerro Tololo	Deep Ecliptic Survey	·	1.7 km	MPC; JPL
658550	2017 SP_{55}	—	March 23, 2015	Haleakala	Pan-STARRS 1	EOS	1.4 km	MPC; JPL
658551	2017 SR_{55}	—	December 17, 2001	Socorro	LINEAR	·	1.9 km	MPC; JPL
658552	2017 SU_{58}	—	February 10, 2008	Mount Lemmon	Mount Lemmon Survey	·	2.3 km	MPC; JPL
658553	2017 SP_{59}	—	September 16, 2017	Haleakala	Pan-STARRS 1	·	2.8 km	MPC; JPL
658554	2017 SS_{59}	—	October 18, 2006	Kitt Peak	Spacewatch	EOS	1.9 km	MPC; JPL
658555	2017 SF_{60}	—	March 31, 2012	Mount Lemmon	Mount Lemmon Survey	·	1.2 km	MPC; JPL
658556	2017 SG_{61}	—	April 29, 2003	Kitt Peak	Spacewatch	·	1.2 km	MPC; JPL
658557	2017 SL_{62}	—	August 31, 2017	Mount Lemmon	Mount Lemmon Survey	·	2.2 km	MPC; JPL
658558	2017 SG_{63}	—	September 17, 2017	Oukaïmeden	C. Rinner	·	2.5 km	MPC; JPL
658559	2017 SK_{63}	—	August 3, 2017	Haleakala	Pan-STARRS 1	·	1.8 km	MPC; JPL
658560	2017 SU_{63}	—	September 24, 2012	Mount Lemmon	Mount Lemmon Survey	·	1.3 km	MPC; JPL
658561	2017 SX_{63}	—	July 28, 2008	Črni Vrh	Matičič, S.	EUN	1.2 km	MPC; JPL
658562	2017 SC_{64}	—	September 26, 2008	Kitt Peak	Spacewatch	·	1.6 km	MPC; JPL
658563	2017 SM_{64}	—	February 28, 2014	Haleakala	Pan-STARRS 1	LIX	2.5 km	MPC; JPL
658564	2017 SW_{64}	—	March 2, 2006	Kitt Peak	Wasserman, L. H., Millis, R. L.	·	1.5 km	MPC; JPL
658565	2017 SD_{65}	—	August 28, 2006	Kitt Peak	Spacewatch	(159)	2.1 km	MPC; JPL
658566	2017 ST_{66}	—	March 4, 2016	Haleakala	Pan-STARRS 1	·	1.2 km	MPC; JPL
658567	2017 SD_{68}	—	October 15, 2012	Kitt Peak	Spacewatch	·	2.1 km	MPC; JPL
658568	2017 SH_{68}	—	September 16, 2012	Kitt Peak	Spacewatch	·	1.6 km	MPC; JPL
658569	2017 SL_{68}	—	September 15, 2006	Kitt Peak	Spacewatch	THM	2.1 km	MPC; JPL
658570	2017 SW_{68}	—	March 16, 2007	Mount Lemmon	Mount Lemmon Survey	·	1.2 km	MPC; JPL
658571	2017 SB_{69}	—	December 2, 2005	Kitt Peak	Wasserman, L. H., Millis, R. L.	AGN	1.2 km	MPC; JPL
658572	2017 SK_{69}	—	September 17, 2017	Haleakala	Pan-STARRS 1	·	1.4 km	MPC; JPL
658573	2017 SV_{71}	—	January 21, 2015	Haleakala	Pan-STARRS 1	HOF	2.1 km	MPC; JPL
658574	2017 ST_{72}	—	November 18, 2008	Kitt Peak	Spacewatch	KOR	1.1 km	MPC; JPL
658575	2017 SZ_{72}	—	October 9, 2012	Mount Lemmon	Mount Lemmon Survey	·	1.8 km	MPC; JPL
658576	2017 SC_{74}	—	December 30, 2013	Haleakala	Pan-STARRS 1	·	1.5 km	MPC; JPL
658577	2017 SQ_{77}	—	November 2, 2007	Mount Lemmon	Mount Lemmon Survey	EOS	1.7 km	MPC; JPL
658578	2017 SY_{77}	—	August 21, 2006	Kitt Peak	Spacewatch	·	1.7 km	MPC; JPL
658579	2017 SF_{78}	—	August 31, 2017	Haleakala	Pan-STARRS 1	EOS	1.5 km	MPC; JPL
658580	2017 SZ_{78}	—	September 25, 1995	Kitt Peak	Spacewatch	·	1.9 km	MPC; JPL
658581	2017 SE_{79}	—	January 5, 2013	Calar Alto-CASADO	Mottola, S.	THM	1.6 km	MPC; JPL
658582	2017 ST_{80}	—	August 31, 2017	Haleakala	Pan-STARRS 1	·	2.2 km	MPC; JPL
658583	2017 SC_{81}	—	August 10, 2002	Cerro Tololo	Deep Ecliptic Survey	KOR	1.2 km	MPC; JPL
658584	2017 SR_{82}	—	November 14, 1995	Kitt Peak	Spacewatch	THM	1.6 km	MPC; JPL
658585	2017 SW_{84}	—	December 21, 2006	Kitt Peak	L. H. Wasserman, M. W. Buie	·	1.1 km	MPC; JPL
658586	2017 SX_{85}	—	September 26, 2006	Catalina	CSS	·	2.2 km	MPC; JPL
658587	2017 SS_{86}	—	May 20, 2015	Cerro Tololo-DECam	DECam	THM	1.7 km	MPC; JPL
658588	2017 SG_{88}	—	October 22, 2012	Mount Lemmon	Mount Lemmon Survey	·	1.8 km	MPC; JPL
658589	2017 SQ_{88}	—	September 19, 2017	Haleakala	Pan-STARRS 1	·	2.0 km	MPC; JPL
658590	2017 SS_{88}	—	November 7, 2012	Mount Lemmon	Mount Lemmon Survey	·	2.2 km	MPC; JPL
658591	2017 SW_{88}	—	September 11, 2007	Kitt Peak	Spacewatch	KOR	1.4 km	MPC; JPL
658592	2017 SP_{89}	—	July 30, 2017	Haleakala	Pan-STARRS 1	·	2.1 km	MPC; JPL
658593	2017 SA_{90}	—	April 18, 2015	Cerro Tololo-DECam	DECam	·	1.4 km	MPC; JPL
658594	2017 SR_{90}	—	October 19, 2012	Haleakala	Pan-STARRS 1	EOS	1.3 km	MPC; JPL
658595	2017 SE_{91}	—	September 26, 2003	Apache Point	SDSS Collaboration	·	1.9 km	MPC; JPL
658596	2017 SM_{91}	—	October 7, 2008	Mount Lemmon	Mount Lemmon Survey	AGN	1.0 km	MPC; JPL
658597	2017 SV_{91}	—	November 18, 2008	Kitt Peak	Spacewatch	KOR	1.2 km	MPC; JPL
658598	2017 SA_{92}	—	March 30, 2008	Kitt Peak	Spacewatch	·	1.2 km	MPC; JPL
658599	2017 SN_{92}	—	October 11, 2012	Kitt Peak	Spacewatch	·	1.2 km	MPC; JPL
658600	2017 SR_{92}	—	October 6, 2008	Kitt Peak	Spacewatch	AST	1.5 km	MPC; JPL

== 658601–658700 ==
back to top

Designation			Discovery			Properties		Ref
Permanent	Provisional	Named after	Date	Site	Discoverer(s)	Category	Diam.	Ref
658601	2017 SY_{93}	—	September 26, 1995	Kitt Peak	Spacewatch	·	2.2 km	MPC; JPL
658602	2017 SF_{95}	—	November 20, 2003	Kitt Peak	Deep Ecliptic Survey	AGN	1.1 km	MPC; JPL
658603	2017 SM_{95}	—	September 14, 2007	Kitt Peak	Spacewatch	·	1.8 km	MPC; JPL
658604	2017 SN_{95}	—	September 25, 2006	Kitt Peak	Spacewatch	·	2.1 km	MPC; JPL
658605	2017 SW_{95}	—	November 7, 2012	Mount Lemmon	Mount Lemmon Survey	·	2.4 km	MPC; JPL
658606	2017 SE_{96}	—	November 9, 2007	Mount Lemmon	Mount Lemmon Survey	·	2.2 km	MPC; JPL
658607	2017 SW_{96}	—	March 5, 2014	Haleakala	Pan-STARRS 1	·	2.1 km	MPC; JPL
658608	2017 SY_{96}	—	February 20, 2014	Mount Lemmon	Mount Lemmon Survey	·	2.1 km	MPC; JPL
658609	2017 SM_{97}	—	October 15, 2007	Kitt Peak	Spacewatch	·	1.5 km	MPC; JPL
658610	2017 SS_{97}	—	November 19, 2003	Kitt Peak	Spacewatch	·	1.8 km	MPC; JPL
658611	2017 SZ_{97}	—	August 31, 2017	Haleakala	Pan-STARRS 1	·	2.8 km	MPC; JPL
658612	2017 SH_{98}	—	January 20, 2015	Haleakala	Pan-STARRS 1	·	1.4 km	MPC; JPL
658613	2017 SH_{99}	—	June 18, 2006	Kitt Peak	Spacewatch	·	1.4 km	MPC; JPL
658614	2017 SL_{102}	—	March 23, 2006	Mount Lemmon	Mount Lemmon Survey	·	2.3 km	MPC; JPL
658615	2017 SU_{102}	—	October 11, 2012	Piszkéstető	K. Sárneczky	·	1.6 km	MPC; JPL
658616	2017 SL_{104}	—	April 23, 2015	Haleakala	Pan-STARRS 1	·	2.1 km	MPC; JPL
658617	2017 SN_{104}	—	October 21, 2012	Haleakala	Pan-STARRS 1	EOS	1.3 km	MPC; JPL
658618	2017 SX_{105}	—	December 4, 2008	Mount Lemmon	Mount Lemmon Survey	EOS	2.1 km	MPC; JPL
658619	2017 SF_{106}	—	August 28, 2006	Kitt Peak	Spacewatch	·	1.9 km	MPC; JPL
658620	2017 SP_{107}	—	October 21, 2012	Kitt Peak	Spacewatch	·	2.3 km	MPC; JPL
658621	2017 SU_{107}	—	January 1, 2008	Kitt Peak	Spacewatch	·	2.2 km	MPC; JPL
658622	2017 SL_{108}	—	October 22, 2012	Haleakala	Pan-STARRS 1	·	2.2 km	MPC; JPL
658623	2017 SM_{109}	—	October 18, 2012	Haleakala	Pan-STARRS 1	·	2.2 km	MPC; JPL
658624	2017 SN_{109}	—	September 20, 2008	Kitt Peak	Spacewatch	·	1.7 km	MPC; JPL
658625	2017 SA_{110}	—	October 15, 2012	Haleakala	Pan-STARRS 1	·	1.6 km	MPC; JPL
658626	2017 SN_{111}	—	September 16, 2012	Mount Lemmon	Mount Lemmon Survey	·	1.4 km	MPC; JPL
658627	2017 SV_{111}	—	October 28, 2008	Mount Lemmon	Mount Lemmon Survey	AST	1.5 km	MPC; JPL
658628	2017 SQ_{114}	—	October 3, 2011	XuYi	PMO NEO Survey Program	·	4.1 km	MPC; JPL
658629	2017 SE_{116}	—	September 16, 2012	Kitt Peak	Spacewatch	·	1.6 km	MPC; JPL
658630	2017 SV_{116}	—	April 2, 2016	Mount Lemmon	Mount Lemmon Survey	·	1.7 km	MPC; JPL
658631	2017 ST_{120}	—	September 20, 1995	Kitt Peak	Spacewatch	·	2.4 km	MPC; JPL
658632	2017 SO_{124}	—	September 3, 2008	Kitt Peak	Spacewatch	·	1.4 km	MPC; JPL
658633	2017 SX_{125}	—	September 26, 2017	Haleakala	Pan-STARRS 1	HYG	2.1 km	MPC; JPL
658634	2017 SH_{126}	—	September 26, 2017	Haleakala	Pan-STARRS 1	·	2.2 km	MPC; JPL
658635	2017 SD_{130}	—	August 31, 2017	Haleakala	Pan-STARRS 1	VER	2.3 km	MPC; JPL
658636	2017 SG_{130}	—	December 30, 2007	Mount Lemmon	Mount Lemmon Survey	HYG	2.5 km	MPC; JPL
658637	2017 SD_{131}	—	August 30, 2011	Haleakala	Pan-STARRS 1	URS	2.4 km	MPC; JPL
658638	2017 SF_{131}	—	April 18, 2015	Cerro Tololo-DECam	DECam	·	2.3 km	MPC; JPL
658639	2017 SP_{132}	—	September 22, 2017	Haleakala	Pan-STARRS 1	·	2.1 km	MPC; JPL
658640	2017 SC_{133}	—	April 23, 2014	Cerro Tololo-DECam	DECam	·	2.4 km	MPC; JPL
658641	2017 SB_{134}	—	May 20, 2015	Cerro Tololo-DECam	DECam	·	2.1 km	MPC; JPL
658642 Carreira	2017 SK_{134}	Carreira	September 29, 2017	Baldone	K. Černis, I. Eglītis	·	1.9 km	MPC; JPL
658643	2017 SL_{134}	—	May 21, 2015	Cerro Tololo-DECam	DECam	VER	1.8 km	MPC; JPL
658644	2017 SR_{134}	—	September 23, 2017	Haleakala	Pan-STARRS 1	·	2.5 km	MPC; JPL
658645	2017 SG_{135}	—	September 24, 2017	Haleakala	Pan-STARRS 1	(5)	1.1 km	MPC; JPL
658646	2017 SA_{138}	—	September 24, 2017	Haleakala	Pan-STARRS 1	EUN	900 m	MPC; JPL
658647	2017 SB_{138}	—	September 23, 2017	Haleakala	Pan-STARRS 1	·	1.7 km	MPC; JPL
658648	2017 SD_{142}	—	September 19, 2017	Haleakala	Pan-STARRS 1	·	2.4 km	MPC; JPL
658649	2017 SS_{142}	—	October 6, 2000	Kitt Peak	Spacewatch	·	2.7 km	MPC; JPL
658650	2017 SN_{151}	—	December 12, 2012	Mount Lemmon	Mount Lemmon Survey	·	2.4 km	MPC; JPL
658651	2017 SH_{157}	—	October 2, 2006	Mount Lemmon	Mount Lemmon Survey	THM	1.8 km	MPC; JPL
658652	2017 SX_{160}	—	September 27, 2017	Mount Lemmon	Mount Lemmon Survey	·	2.6 km	MPC; JPL
658653	2017 SA_{161}	—	September 24, 2017	Mount Lemmon	Mount Lemmon Survey	·	2.2 km	MPC; JPL
658654	2017 SL_{168}	—	May 20, 2015	Cerro Tololo-DECam	DECam	·	1.6 km	MPC; JPL
658655	2017 SO_{178}	—	September 25, 2017	Haleakala	Pan-STARRS 1	·	1.9 km	MPC; JPL
658656	2017 SO_{183}	—	September 22, 2017	Haleakala	Pan-STARRS 1	·	1.9 km	MPC; JPL
658657	2017 SY_{184}	—	September 21, 2017	Haleakala	Pan-STARRS 1	·	2.4 km	MPC; JPL
658658	2017 ST_{189}	—	April 18, 2015	Cerro Tololo-DECam	DECam	·	1.6 km	MPC; JPL
658659	2017 SJ_{190}	—	August 28, 2001	Kitt Peak	Spacewatch	·	1.4 km	MPC; JPL
658660	2017 SO_{192}	—	October 10, 2007	Kitt Peak	Spacewatch	·	1.2 km	MPC; JPL
658661	2017 SP_{192}	—	September 25, 2017	Haleakala	Pan-STARRS 1	·	1.9 km	MPC; JPL
658662	2017 SF_{194}	—	September 17, 2017	Haleakala	Pan-STARRS 1	·	1.9 km	MPC; JPL
658663	2017 SZ_{194}	—	May 20, 2015	Cerro Tololo-DECam	DECam	·	2.2 km	MPC; JPL
658664	2017 SY_{196}	—	April 10, 2015	Mount Lemmon	Mount Lemmon Survey	HOF	1.9 km	MPC; JPL
658665	2017 SJ_{197}	—	May 20, 2015	Cerro Tololo-DECam	DECam	VER	1.8 km	MPC; JPL
658666	2017 SG_{198}	—	September 17, 2017	Haleakala	Pan-STARRS 1	·	2.3 km	MPC; JPL
658667	2017 SQ_{198}	—	September 24, 2017	Mount Lemmon	Mount Lemmon Survey	·	3.4 km	MPC; JPL
658668	2017 SU_{198}	—	September 26, 2017	Haleakala	Pan-STARRS 1	·	2.0 km	MPC; JPL
658669	2017 SV_{198}	—	September 16, 2017	Haleakala	Pan-STARRS 1	·	2.7 km	MPC; JPL
658670	2017 SW_{198}	—	September 29, 2017	Haleakala	Pan-STARRS 1	VER	2.2 km	MPC; JPL
658671	2017 SO_{199}	—	April 10, 2015	Mount Lemmon	Mount Lemmon Survey	·	1.6 km	MPC; JPL
658672	2017 SV_{200}	—	September 16, 2017	Haleakala	Pan-STARRS 1	·	2.0 km	MPC; JPL
658673	2017 SW_{200}	—	September 26, 2017	Haleakala	Pan-STARRS 1	·	2.2 km	MPC; JPL
658674	2017 SF_{201}	—	September 21, 2017	Haleakala	Pan-STARRS 1	·	2.1 km	MPC; JPL
658675	2017 SZ_{203}	—	April 19, 2015	Cerro Tololo-DECam	DECam	·	2.0 km	MPC; JPL
658676	2017 SB_{204}	—	May 20, 2015	Cerro Tololo-DECam	DECam	·	1.9 km	MPC; JPL
658677	2017 SD_{204}	—	April 19, 2015	Mount Lemmon	Mount Lemmon Survey	·	2.0 km	MPC; JPL
658678	2017 SH_{204}	—	September 19, 2017	Haleakala	Pan-STARRS 1	·	2.2 km	MPC; JPL
658679	2017 SK_{204}	—	September 25, 2017	Haleakala	Pan-STARRS 1	·	1.1 km	MPC; JPL
658680	2017 SV_{204}	—	May 20, 2015	Cerro Tololo-DECam	DECam	EOS	1.2 km	MPC; JPL
658681	2017 SA_{205}	—	September 23, 2017	Haleakala	Pan-STARRS 1	·	1.4 km	MPC; JPL
658682	2017 SQ_{205}	—	September 19, 2017	Haleakala	Pan-STARRS 1	·	1.5 km	MPC; JPL
658683	2017 ST_{208}	—	September 23, 2017	Haleakala	Pan-STARRS 1	·	2.4 km	MPC; JPL
658684	2017 SZ_{208}	—	September 24, 2017	Haleakala	Pan-STARRS 1	KOR	1.1 km	MPC; JPL
658685	2017 SD_{209}	—	September 23, 2017	Haleakala	Pan-STARRS 1	URS	2.4 km	MPC; JPL
658686	2017 SJ_{209}	—	September 21, 2017	Haleakala	Pan-STARRS 1	·	1.6 km	MPC; JPL
658687	2017 SW_{210}	—	September 16, 2017	Haleakala	Pan-STARRS 1	·	2.1 km	MPC; JPL
658688	2017 SN_{218}	—	September 26, 2017	Haleakala	Pan-STARRS 1	·	1.4 km	MPC; JPL
658689	2017 SF_{219}	—	July 4, 1995	Kitt Peak	Spacewatch	EOS	1.6 km	MPC; JPL
658690	2017 SP_{219}	—	May 20, 2015	Cerro Tololo-DECam	DECam	EOS	1.3 km	MPC; JPL
658691	2017 SC_{227}	—	April 18, 2015	Cerro Tololo-DECam	DECam	EOS	1.3 km	MPC; JPL
658692	2017 SE_{227}	—	September 21, 2017	Haleakala	Pan-STARRS 1	·	2.0 km	MPC; JPL
658693	2017 SH_{227}	—	September 17, 2017	Haleakala	Pan-STARRS 1	KOR	990 m	MPC; JPL
658694	2017 SY_{233}	—	September 17, 2017	Haleakala	Pan-STARRS 1	·	2.2 km	MPC; JPL
658695	2017 SX_{241}	—	September 17, 2017	Haleakala	Pan-STARRS 1	T_{j} (2.98)	2.8 km	MPC; JPL
658696	2017 SV_{243}	—	April 18, 2015	Cerro Tololo-DECam	DECam	THM	1.9 km	MPC; JPL
658697	2017 SF_{246}	—	September 23, 2017	Haleakala	Pan-STARRS 1	·	2.4 km	MPC; JPL
658698	2017 ST_{247}	—	September 23, 2017	Haleakala	Pan-STARRS 1	THM	1.7 km	MPC; JPL
658699	2017 SB_{248}	—	May 20, 2015	Cerro Tololo-DECam	DECam	·	2.2 km	MPC; JPL
658700	2017 SG_{250}	—	September 17, 2017	Haleakala	Pan-STARRS 1	·	1.8 km	MPC; JPL

== 658701–658800 ==
back to top

Designation			Discovery			Properties		Ref
Permanent	Provisional	Named after	Date	Site	Discoverer(s)	Category	Diam.	Ref
658701	2017 SE_{253}	—	September 19, 2017	Haleakala	Pan-STARRS 1	·	2.3 km	MPC; JPL
658702	2017 SJ_{255}	—	April 18, 2015	Cerro Tololo	DECam	·	2.5 km	MPC; JPL
658703	2017 SP_{255}	—	April 21, 2015	Cerro Tololo-DECam	DECam	·	2.4 km	MPC; JPL
658704	2017 SO_{278}	—	September 19, 2017	Haleakala	Pan-STARRS 1	·	1.5 km	MPC; JPL
658705	2017 SP_{293}	—	September 23, 2017	Haleakala	Pan-STARRS 1	EOS	1.2 km	MPC; JPL
658706	2017 SD_{294}	—	September 21, 2017	Haleakala	Pan-STARRS 1	BRA	1.1 km	MPC; JPL
658707	2017 SD_{299}	—	September 17, 2017	Haleakala	Pan-STARRS 1	·	2.6 km	MPC; JPL
658708	2017 SD_{302}	—	September 19, 2017	Haleakala	Pan-STARRS 1	·	1.6 km	MPC; JPL
658709	2017 SM_{307}	—	September 21, 2017	Haleakala	Pan-STARRS 1	VER	2.0 km	MPC; JPL
658710	2017 SE_{328}	—	September 21, 2017	Haleakala	Pan-STARRS 1	·	2.2 km	MPC; JPL
658711	2017 TL	—	January 10, 2016	Haleakala	Pan-STARRS 1	H	540 m	MPC; JPL
658712	2017 TW	—	June 5, 2005	Kitt Peak	Spacewatch	·	1.2 km	MPC; JPL
658713	2017 TV_{9}	—	November 5, 2007	Mount Lemmon	Mount Lemmon Survey	·	2.4 km	MPC; JPL
658714	2017 TY_{10}	—	September 28, 2006	Catalina	CSS	·	2.6 km	MPC; JPL
658715	2017 TT_{12}	—	November 20, 2003	Kitt Peak	Spacewatch	BRA	1.1 km	MPC; JPL
658716	2017 TP_{14}	—	September 22, 2017	Haleakala	Pan-STARRS 1	·	2.3 km	MPC; JPL
658717	2017 TP_{24}	—	September 21, 2017	Haleakala	Pan-STARRS 1	·	1.9 km	MPC; JPL
658718	2017 TT_{24}	—	May 21, 2015	Cerro Tololo-DECam	DECam	EOS	1.4 km	MPC; JPL
658719	2017 TW_{24}	—	September 19, 2017	Haleakala	Pan-STARRS 1	·	3.4 km	MPC; JPL
658720	2017 TZ_{24}	—	October 2, 2017	Mount Lemmon	Mount Lemmon Survey	·	3.4 km	MPC; JPL
658721	2017 TA_{25}	—	January 6, 2013	Mount Lemmon	Mount Lemmon Survey	·	2.0 km	MPC; JPL
658722	2017 TK_{25}	—	April 18, 2015	Cerro Tololo-DECam	DECam	·	1.4 km	MPC; JPL
658723	2017 TT_{25}	—	April 19, 2015	Cerro Tololo-DECam	DECam	·	2.2 km	MPC; JPL
658724	2017 TZ_{25}	—	October 13, 2017	Mount Lemmon	Mount Lemmon Survey	EOS	1.3 km	MPC; JPL
658725	2017 TH_{26}	—	October 13, 2017	Mount Lemmon	Mount Lemmon Survey	·	1.5 km	MPC; JPL
658726	2017 TJ_{26}	—	April 21, 2015	Cerro Tololo-DECam	DECam	·	2.1 km	MPC; JPL
658727	2017 TO_{29}	—	April 18, 2015	Cerro Tololo-DECam	DECam	·	1.9 km	MPC; JPL
658728	2017 TZ_{35}	—	October 1, 2017	Haleakala	Pan-STARRS 1	·	2.1 km	MPC; JPL
658729	2017 TF_{36}	—	October 21, 2012	Haleakala	Pan-STARRS 1	·	1.7 km	MPC; JPL
658730	2017 UW_{2}	—	October 20, 2017	Mount Lemmon	Mount Lemmon Survey	·	950 m	MPC; JPL
658731	2017 UD_{9}	—	September 26, 2006	Kitt Peak	Spacewatch	·	2.3 km	MPC; JPL
658732	2017 UA_{12}	—	September 17, 2006	Kitt Peak	Spacewatch	·	2.5 km	MPC; JPL
658733	2017 UL_{13}	—	August 24, 2006	Palomar	NEAT	·	2.6 km	MPC; JPL
658734	2017 UD_{14}	—	April 19, 2015	Cerro Tololo-DECam	DECam	·	2.1 km	MPC; JPL
658735	2017 UZ_{14}	—	June 8, 2016	Haleakala	Pan-STARRS 1	·	2.4 km	MPC; JPL
658736	2017 UN_{15}	—	August 20, 2017	Haleakala	Pan-STARRS 1	·	2.1 km	MPC; JPL
658737	2017 UM_{19}	—	February 16, 2015	Haleakala	Pan-STARRS 1	KOR	1.1 km	MPC; JPL
658738	2017 UN_{19}	—	August 22, 2003	Palomar	NEAT	·	2.0 km	MPC; JPL
658739	2017 UG_{20}	—	August 31, 2003	Kitt Peak	Spacewatch	·	1.5 km	MPC; JPL
658740	2017 UV_{20}	—	November 17, 1995	Kitt Peak	Spacewatch	·	2.1 km	MPC; JPL
658741	2017 UG_{21}	—	December 29, 2008	Bergisch Gladbach	W. Bickel	·	2.1 km	MPC; JPL
658742	2017 UO_{21}	—	January 27, 2015	Haleakala	Pan-STARRS 1	·	1.8 km	MPC; JPL
658743	2017 UB_{25}	—	October 22, 2012	Haleakala	Pan-STARRS 1	EOS	1.5 km	MPC; JPL
658744	2017 UT_{25}	—	August 31, 2017	Haleakala	Pan-STARRS 1	·	1.7 km	MPC; JPL
658745	2017 UB_{27}	—	October 14, 2012	Kitt Peak	Spacewatch	EOS	1.9 km	MPC; JPL
658746	2017 US_{28}	—	August 24, 2017	Haleakala	Pan-STARRS 1	·	2.0 km	MPC; JPL
658747	2017 UR_{29}	—	April 19, 2012	Mount Lemmon	Mount Lemmon Survey	·	880 m	MPC; JPL
658748	2017 UZ_{29}	—	March 16, 2005	Kitt Peak	Spacewatch	KOR	1.5 km	MPC; JPL
658749	2017 UW_{30}	—	May 25, 2011	Kitt Peak	Spacewatch	BRA	1.2 km	MPC; JPL
658750	2017 UX_{30}	—	April 10, 2015	Mount Lemmon	Mount Lemmon Survey	·	2.4 km	MPC; JPL
658751	2017 UH_{31}	—	September 25, 2006	Kitt Peak	Spacewatch	·	2.1 km	MPC; JPL
658752	2017 UJ_{31}	—	September 25, 2006	Kitt Peak	Spacewatch	·	2.2 km	MPC; JPL
658753	2017 UK_{31}	—	August 20, 2011	Haleakala	Pan-STARRS 1	·	2.5 km	MPC; JPL
658754	2017 UO_{31}	—	April 15, 2010	Mount Lemmon	Mount Lemmon Survey	·	2.5 km	MPC; JPL
658755	2017 UM_{32}	—	November 30, 2003	Kitt Peak	Spacewatch	KOR	1.2 km	MPC; JPL
658756	2017 UQ_{35}	—	December 25, 2005	Mount Lemmon	Mount Lemmon Survey	·	1.2 km	MPC; JPL
658757	2017 US_{35}	—	June 6, 2016	Haleakala	Pan-STARRS 1	·	2.2 km	MPC; JPL
658758	2017 UV_{36}	—	May 24, 2000	Mauna Kea	C. Veillet, D. D. Balam	·	1.2 km	MPC; JPL
658759	2017 UT_{37}	—	December 23, 2012	Haleakala	Pan-STARRS 1	·	2.7 km	MPC; JPL
658760	2017 UO_{38}	—	May 28, 2008	Kitt Peak	Spacewatch	·	1.1 km	MPC; JPL
658761	2017 UQ_{38}	—	October 23, 2013	Haleakala	Pan-STARRS 1	·	1.1 km	MPC; JPL
658762	2017 UE_{39}	—	December 2, 2012	Mount Lemmon	Mount Lemmon Survey	·	2.0 km	MPC; JPL
658763	2017 UW_{39}	—	April 9, 2014	Haleakala	Pan-STARRS 1	·	2.5 km	MPC; JPL
658764	2017 UF_{40}	—	January 6, 2013	Mount Lemmon	Mount Lemmon Survey	·	2.7 km	MPC; JPL
658765	2017 UF_{45}	—	January 30, 2016	Haleakala	Pan-STARRS 1	H	590 m	MPC; JPL
658766	2017 UQ_{53}	—	October 27, 2017	Haleakala	Pan-STARRS 1	EOS	1.5 km	MPC; JPL
658767	2017 UX_{63}	—	October 22, 2017	Mount Lemmon	Mount Lemmon Survey	·	1.1 km	MPC; JPL
658768	2017 UG_{69}	—	October 31, 2017	Haleakala	Pan-STARRS 1	EUP	2.3 km	MPC; JPL
658769	2017 UQ_{78}	—	October 20, 2017	Mount Lemmon	Mount Lemmon Survey	·	1.7 km	MPC; JPL
658770	2017 UR_{78}	—	October 1, 2006	Kitt Peak	Spacewatch	EOS	1.4 km	MPC; JPL
658771	2017 UA_{79}	—	April 20, 2015	Haleakala	Pan-STARRS 1	·	1.7 km	MPC; JPL
658772	2017 UA_{85}	—	October 27, 2017	Mount Lemmon	Mount Lemmon Survey	·	2.3 km	MPC; JPL
658773	2017 UC_{87}	—	October 23, 2017	Mount Lemmon	Mount Lemmon Survey	·	2.2 km	MPC; JPL
658774	2017 UT_{87}	—	February 14, 2008	Mount Lemmon	Mount Lemmon Survey	·	1.7 km	MPC; JPL
658775	2017 UV_{89}	—	October 21, 2017	Mount Lemmon	Mount Lemmon Survey	·	2.3 km	MPC; JPL
658776	2017 UO_{91}	—	April 23, 2014	Cerro Tololo-DECam	DECam	·	2.0 km	MPC; JPL
658777	2017 UY_{91}	—	October 29, 2017	Haleakala	Pan-STARRS 1	EOS	1.5 km	MPC; JPL
658778	2017 UO_{92}	—	June 8, 2016	Haleakala	Pan-STARRS 1	·	1.6 km	MPC; JPL
658779	2017 UC_{93}	—	October 18, 2017	Haleakala	Pan-STARRS 1	·	2.4 km	MPC; JPL
658780	2017 UE_{93}	—	October 21, 2017	Haleakala	Pan-STARRS 1	·	1.2 km	MPC; JPL
658781	2017 UF_{93}	—	October 24, 2017	Mount Lemmon	Mount Lemmon Survey	·	2.9 km	MPC; JPL
658782	2017 UP_{93}	—	October 27, 2017	Haleakala	Pan-STARRS 1	·	1.7 km	MPC; JPL
658783	2017 UZ_{93}	—	April 18, 2015	Cerro Tololo	DECam	·	1.6 km	MPC; JPL
658784	2017 UA_{94}	—	September 22, 2017	Haleakala	Pan-STARRS 1	·	1.8 km	MPC; JPL
658785	2017 UE_{94}	—	May 11, 2015	Mount Lemmon	Mount Lemmon Survey	EOS	1.4 km	MPC; JPL
658786	2017 UF_{94}	—	October 21, 2017	Mount Lemmon	Mount Lemmon Survey	·	1.8 km	MPC; JPL
658787 Alksnis	2017 UM_{95}	Alksnis	October 19, 2017	Baldone	K. Černis, I. Eglītis	·	1.9 km	MPC; JPL
658788	2017 UT_{95}	—	May 21, 2015	Haleakala	Pan-STARRS 1	·	2.0 km	MPC; JPL
658789	2017 UV_{95}	—	May 20, 2015	Cerro Tololo-DECam	DECam	·	1.7 km	MPC; JPL
658790	2017 UB_{97}	—	April 18, 2015	Cerro Tololo-DECam	DECam	·	1.7 km	MPC; JPL
658791	2017 UU_{98}	—	October 29, 2017	Haleakala	Pan-STARRS 1	·	1.5 km	MPC; JPL
658792	2017 UV_{98}	—	October 22, 2017	Mount Lemmon	Mount Lemmon Survey	·	1.2 km	MPC; JPL
658793	2017 UW_{98}	—	October 18, 2017	Mount Lemmon	Mount Lemmon Survey	·	2.1 km	MPC; JPL
658794	2017 UO_{99}	—	October 18, 2017	Haleakala	Pan-STARRS 1	·	1.4 km	MPC; JPL
658795	2017 UE_{100}	—	October 21, 2017	Haleakala	Pan-STARRS 1	T_{j} (2.98)	2.9 km	MPC; JPL
658796	2017 UO_{100}	—	October 22, 2017	Mount Lemmon	Mount Lemmon Survey	·	1.9 km	MPC; JPL
658797	2017 UH_{104}	—	October 23, 2017	Mount Lemmon	Mount Lemmon Survey	·	1.7 km	MPC; JPL
658798	2017 UO_{104}	—	October 23, 2017	Mount Lemmon	Mount Lemmon Survey	·	2.2 km	MPC; JPL
658799	2017 UP_{104}	—	October 23, 2017	Mount Lemmon	Mount Lemmon Survey	EOS	1.5 km	MPC; JPL
658800	2017 UQ_{104}	—	October 29, 2017	Haleakala	Pan-STARRS 1	·	2.4 km	MPC; JPL

== 658801–658900 ==
back to top

Designation			Discovery			Properties		Ref
Permanent	Provisional	Named after	Date	Site	Discoverer(s)	Category	Diam.	Ref
658801	2017 UN_{105}	—	October 30, 2017	Haleakala	Pan-STARRS 1	EOS	1.4 km	MPC; JPL
658802	2017 UZ_{109}	—	May 20, 2015	Cerro Tololo	DECam	·	1.9 km	MPC; JPL
658803	2017 UQ_{113}	—	October 15, 2017	Mount Lemmon	Mount Lemmon Survey	·	1.5 km	MPC; JPL
658804	2017 UH_{118}	—	October 23, 2017	Mount Lemmon	Mount Lemmon Survey	·	1.7 km	MPC; JPL
658805	2017 UN_{136}	—	October 27, 2017	Haleakala	Pan-STARRS 1	TIR	2.1 km	MPC; JPL
658806	2017 UV_{138}	—	October 17, 2017	Mount Lemmon	Mount Lemmon Survey	·	2.2 km	MPC; JPL
658807	2017 UP_{140}	—	November 14, 2012	Kitt Peak	Spacewatch	·	1.9 km	MPC; JPL
658808	2017 UK_{141}	—	May 20, 2015	Cerro Tololo	DECam	·	2.1 km	MPC; JPL
658809	2017 US_{142}	—	October 28, 2017	Mount Lemmon	Mount Lemmon Survey	(43176)	2.4 km	MPC; JPL
658810	2017 UL_{152}	—	October 30, 2017	Haleakala	Pan-STARRS 1	·	1.5 km	MPC; JPL
658811	2017 UU_{178}	—	October 22, 2017	Mount Lemmon	Mount Lemmon Survey	·	2.3 km	MPC; JPL
658812	2017 UV_{182}	—	May 20, 2015	Cerro Tololo	DECam	·	1.9 km	MPC; JPL
658813	2017 UV_{195}	—	October 27, 2017	Mount Lemmon	Mount Lemmon Survey	·	2.4 km	MPC; JPL
658814	2017 UJ_{200}	—	October 28, 2017	Haleakala	Pan-STARRS 1	·	1.1 km	MPC; JPL
658815	2017 VQ_{2}	—	December 4, 2012	Mount Lemmon	Mount Lemmon Survey	EOS	1.6 km	MPC; JPL
658816	2017 VY_{2}	—	August 1, 2017	Haleakala	Pan-STARRS 1	·	2.4 km	MPC; JPL
658817	2017 VZ_{7}	—	September 25, 2008	Kitt Peak	Spacewatch	·	1.3 km	MPC; JPL
658818	2017 VD_{12}	—	September 30, 2006	Mount Lemmon	Mount Lemmon Survey	·	1.6 km	MPC; JPL
658819	2017 VG_{16}	—	February 4, 2009	Mount Lemmon	Mount Lemmon Survey	·	2.7 km	MPC; JPL
658820	2017 VR_{16}	—	September 19, 2017	Haleakala	Pan-STARRS 1	·	1.8 km	MPC; JPL
658821	2017 VL_{17}	—	March 24, 2015	Mount Lemmon	Mount Lemmon Survey	·	1.7 km	MPC; JPL
658822	2017 VP_{17}	—	September 26, 2011	Mount Lemmon	Mount Lemmon Survey	·	2.5 km	MPC; JPL
658823	2017 VB_{19}	—	June 11, 2007	Mauna Kea	D. D. Balam, K. M. Perrett	·	1.8 km	MPC; JPL
658824	2017 VD_{19}	—	November 20, 2006	Kitt Peak	Spacewatch	·	2.5 km	MPC; JPL
658825	2017 VQ_{20}	—	September 19, 2012	Mount Lemmon	Mount Lemmon Survey	·	1.7 km	MPC; JPL
658826	2017 VZ_{22}	—	November 2, 2007	Kitt Peak	Spacewatch	·	950 m	MPC; JPL
658827	2017 VA_{24}	—	September 27, 2006	Kitt Peak	Spacewatch	·	2.0 km	MPC; JPL
658828	2017 VX_{24}	—	October 8, 2007	Kitt Peak	Spacewatch	·	1.7 km	MPC; JPL
658829	2017 VV_{25}	—	October 28, 2017	Haleakala	Pan-STARRS 1	KOR	910 m	MPC; JPL
658830	2017 VS_{26}	—	August 9, 2016	Haleakala	Pan-STARRS 1	·	2.5 km	MPC; JPL
658831	2017 VW_{28}	—	June 7, 2016	Haleakala	Pan-STARRS 1	·	2.0 km	MPC; JPL
658832	2017 VY_{28}	—	September 23, 2008	Kitt Peak	Spacewatch	WIT	710 m	MPC; JPL
658833	2017 VS_{32}	—	September 11, 2005	Kitt Peak	Spacewatch	HYG	2.3 km	MPC; JPL
658834	2017 VD_{33}	—	October 21, 2006	Mount Lemmon	Mount Lemmon Survey	LIX	2.8 km	MPC; JPL
658835	2017 VX_{33}	—	October 30, 2013	Haleakala	Pan-STARRS 1	·	740 m	MPC; JPL
658836	2017 VN_{34}	—	September 21, 2017	Haleakala	Pan-STARRS 1	·	2.6 km	MPC; JPL
658837	2017 VM_{38}	—	July 11, 2016	Haleakala	Pan-STARRS 1	·	2.5 km	MPC; JPL
658838	2017 VM_{41}	—	May 26, 2015	Haleakala	Pan-STARRS 1	·	1.4 km	MPC; JPL
658839	2017 VO_{41}	—	May 20, 2015	Cerro Tololo	DECam	·	1.4 km	MPC; JPL
658840	2017 VT_{41}	—	May 20, 2015	Cerro Tololo	DECam	·	1.5 km	MPC; JPL
658841	2017 VQ_{45}	—	September 13, 2002	Palomar Mountain	NEAT	·	1.9 km	MPC; JPL
658842	2017 VD_{52}	—	May 20, 2015	Cerro Tololo-DECam	DECam	·	1.1 km	MPC; JPL
658843	2017 VJ_{54}	—	November 15, 2017	Mount Lemmon	Mount Lemmon Survey	KOR	1.0 km	MPC; JPL
658844	2017 VD_{71}	—	January 30, 2008	Mount Lemmon	Mount Lemmon Survey	·	1.8 km	MPC; JPL
658845	2017 WP_{2}	—	October 25, 1995	Kitt Peak	Spacewatch	·	2.1 km	MPC; JPL
658846	2017 WH_{3}	—	September 28, 2006	Mount Lemmon	Mount Lemmon Survey	·	2.7 km	MPC; JPL
658847	2017 WK_{3}	—	August 23, 2011	Haleakala	Pan-STARRS 1	THM	1.8 km	MPC; JPL
658848	2017 WY_{4}	—	October 31, 2006	Mount Lemmon	Mount Lemmon Survey	·	3.4 km	MPC; JPL
658849	2017 WQ_{5}	—	September 18, 2011	Mount Lemmon	Mount Lemmon Survey	EOS	1.3 km	MPC; JPL
658850	2017 WN_{6}	—	October 21, 2017	Haleakala	Pan-STARRS 1	·	2.4 km	MPC; JPL
658851	2017 WP_{7}	—	July 28, 2011	Siding Spring	SSS	·	1.9 km	MPC; JPL
658852	2017 WF_{10}	—	July 13, 2016	Haleakala	Pan-STARRS 1	·	2.2 km	MPC; JPL
658853	2017 WB_{11}	—	October 20, 2006	Kitt Peak	Spacewatch	·	2.4 km	MPC; JPL
658854	2017 WK_{18}	—	September 29, 2011	Mount Lemmon	Mount Lemmon Survey	·	2.1 km	MPC; JPL
658855	2017 WO_{21}	—	October 21, 2006	Mount Lemmon	Mount Lemmon Survey	·	2.1 km	MPC; JPL
658856	2017 WX_{22}	—	December 9, 2012	Piszkéstető	K. Sárneczky	EMA	3.0 km	MPC; JPL
658857	2017 WG_{23}	—	August 27, 2006	Kitt Peak	Spacewatch	EOS	1.7 km	MPC; JPL
658858	2017 WN_{23}	—	October 25, 2017	Mount Lemmon	Mount Lemmon Survey	·	1.6 km	MPC; JPL
658859	2017 WS_{25}	—	November 9, 2017	Haleakala	Pan-STARRS 1	·	2.0 km	MPC; JPL
658860	2017 WT_{25}	—	December 22, 2006	Socorro	LINEAR	T_{j} (2.94)	2.9 km	MPC; JPL
658861	2017 WX_{29}	—	October 2, 2008	Mount Lemmon	Mount Lemmon Survey	·	1.5 km	MPC; JPL
658862	2017 WG_{38}	—	September 24, 2011	Mount Lemmon	Mount Lemmon Survey	·	2.3 km	MPC; JPL
658863	2017 WL_{40}	—	November 19, 2017	Haleakala	Pan-STARRS 1	·	2.1 km	MPC; JPL
658864	2017 WU_{40}	—	November 19, 2017	Haleakala	Pan-STARRS 1	·	1.8 km	MPC; JPL
658865	2017 WV_{40}	—	November 21, 2017	Mount Lemmon	Mount Lemmon Survey	·	1.7 km	MPC; JPL
658866	2017 WF_{41}	—	January 10, 2007	Kitt Peak	Spacewatch	·	2.3 km	MPC; JPL
658867	2017 WJ_{43}	—	September 22, 2017	Haleakala	Pan-STARRS 1	·	2.5 km	MPC; JPL
658868	2017 WR_{43}	—	November 17, 2017	Haleakala	Pan-STARRS 1	·	2.4 km	MPC; JPL
658869	2017 WX_{43}	—	November 16, 2017	Mount Lemmon	Mount Lemmon Survey	EUN	1.0 km	MPC; JPL
658870	2017 WW_{44}	—	April 23, 2014	Cerro Tololo	DECam	·	2.0 km	MPC; JPL
658871	2017 WA_{45}	—	May 20, 2015	Cerro Tololo-DECam	DECam	·	1.4 km	MPC; JPL
658872	2017 WE_{45}	—	November 21, 2017	Mount Lemmon	Mount Lemmon Survey	·	1.1 km	MPC; JPL
658873	2017 WH_{45}	—	March 21, 2015	Haleakala	Pan-STARRS 1	·	2.1 km	MPC; JPL
658874	2017 WY_{49}	—	November 21, 2017	Mount Lemmon	Mount Lemmon Survey	·	2.5 km	MPC; JPL
658875	2017 WO_{51}	—	January 16, 2013	Mount Lemmon	Mount Lemmon Survey	TIR	2.3 km	MPC; JPL
658876	2017 WU_{58}	—	November 17, 2017	Haleakala	Pan-STARRS 1	·	1.8 km	MPC; JPL
658877	2017 WY_{58}	—	November 28, 2017	Mount Lemmon	Mount Lemmon Survey	·	2.4 km	MPC; JPL
658878	2017 WY_{61}	—	November 26, 2017	Mount Lemmon	Mount Lemmon Survey	·	2.1 km	MPC; JPL
658879	2017 WU_{63}	—	November 16, 2017	Mount Lemmon	Mount Lemmon Survey	·	2.0 km	MPC; JPL
658880	2017 WV_{63}	—	August 5, 2005	Mauna Kea	P. A. Wiegert, D. D. Balam	·	2.1 km	MPC; JPL
658881	2017 WR_{64}	—	November 21, 2017	Mount Lemmon	Mount Lemmon Survey	EOS	1.5 km	MPC; JPL
658882 Žemaitija	2017 WV_{90}	Žemaitija	October 23, 2017	Baldone	K. Černis, I. Eglītis	EOS	1.4 km	MPC; JPL
658883	2017 XD	—	October 26, 2017	Mount Lemmon	Mount Lemmon Survey	APO +1km	1.2 km	MPC; JPL
658884	2017 XD_{4}	—	January 28, 2015	Haleakala	Pan-STARRS 1	·	2.4 km	MPC; JPL
658885	2017 XN_{4}	—	November 9, 2008	Kitt Peak	Spacewatch	·	770 m	MPC; JPL
658886	2017 XS_{5}	—	August 27, 2005	Anderson Mesa	LONEOS	·	2.7 km	MPC; JPL
658887	2017 XA_{7}	—	August 16, 2012	ESA OGS	ESA OGS	·	990 m	MPC; JPL
658888	2017 XW_{7}	—	September 3, 2013	Catalina	CSS	·	990 m	MPC; JPL
658889	2017 XC_{9}	—	August 7, 2016	Haleakala	Pan-STARRS 1	EOS	1.2 km	MPC; JPL
658890	2017 XV_{9}	—	September 10, 2007	Kitt Peak	Spacewatch	·	440 m	MPC; JPL
658891	2017 XU_{10}	—	August 29, 2006	Kitt Peak	Spacewatch	·	1.7 km	MPC; JPL
658892	2017 XP_{13}	—	October 1, 2011	Kitt Peak	Spacewatch	·	2.1 km	MPC; JPL
658893	2017 XQ_{14}	—	September 24, 2006	Kitt Peak	Spacewatch	·	1.8 km	MPC; JPL
658894	2017 XE_{16}	—	September 17, 2006	Kitt Peak	Spacewatch	·	2.3 km	MPC; JPL
658895	2017 XW_{20}	—	November 14, 2017	Mount Lemmon	Mount Lemmon Survey	·	1.6 km	MPC; JPL
658896	2017 XH_{23}	—	October 15, 2006	Lulin	LUSS	·	2.4 km	MPC; JPL
658897	2017 XD_{24}	—	October 20, 2006	Mount Lemmon	Mount Lemmon Survey	·	2.0 km	MPC; JPL
658898	2017 XD_{27}	—	April 5, 2014	Haleakala	Pan-STARRS 1	TIR	2.0 km	MPC; JPL
658899	2017 XE_{27}	—	September 23, 2008	Kitt Peak	Spacewatch	·	1.3 km	MPC; JPL
658900	2017 XA_{28}	—	September 28, 2011	Kitt Peak	Spacewatch	·	2.3 km	MPC; JPL

== 658901–659000 ==
back to top

Designation			Discovery			Properties		Ref
Permanent	Provisional	Named after	Date	Site	Discoverer(s)	Category	Diam.	Ref
658901	2017 XO_{28}	—	September 27, 2011	Mount Lemmon	Mount Lemmon Survey	·	1.7 km	MPC; JPL
658902	2017 XN_{34}	—	November 21, 2017	Haleakala	Pan-STARRS 1	·	2.2 km	MPC; JPL
658903	2017 XF_{36}	—	December 15, 2006	Kitt Peak	Spacewatch	·	2.2 km	MPC; JPL
658904	2017 XO_{36}	—	November 19, 2003	Socorro	LINEAR	H	590 m	MPC; JPL
658905	2017 XR_{36}	—	August 8, 2016	Haleakala	Pan-STARRS 1	EOS	1.4 km	MPC; JPL
658906	2017 XT_{37}	—	September 23, 2011	Haleakala	Pan-STARRS 1	·	2.2 km	MPC; JPL
658907	2017 XR_{40}	—	October 27, 2006	Mount Lemmon	Mount Lemmon Survey	·	2.2 km	MPC; JPL
658908	2017 XE_{44}	—	October 30, 2017	Haleakala	Pan-STARRS 1	·	2.1 km	MPC; JPL
658909	2017 XF_{46}	—	December 15, 2006	Kitt Peak	Spacewatch	·	1.4 km	MPC; JPL
658910	2017 XG_{46}	—	August 31, 2011	Piszkéstető	K. Sárneczky	·	2.7 km	MPC; JPL
658911	2017 XM_{53}	—	September 17, 2006	Kitt Peak	Spacewatch	·	1.8 km	MPC; JPL
658912	2017 XA_{56}	—	October 2, 2000	Anderson Mesa	LONEOS	THB	2.9 km	MPC; JPL
658913	2017 XO_{56}	—	November 27, 2013	Haleakala	Pan-STARRS 1	·	850 m	MPC; JPL
658914	2017 XT_{58}	—	October 19, 1995	Kitt Peak	Spacewatch	·	820 m	MPC; JPL
658915	2017 XR_{59}	—	October 20, 2006	Kitt Peak	Deep Ecliptic Survey	·	3.5 km	MPC; JPL
658916	2017 XF_{63}	—	November 28, 2000	Kitt Peak	Spacewatch	(5)	1.2 km	MPC; JPL
658917	2017 XC_{65}	—	December 13, 2017	Haleakala	Pan-STARRS 1	(69559)	2.6 km	MPC; JPL
658918	2017 XE_{71}	—	December 13, 2017	Haleakala	Pan-STARRS 1	·	2.6 km	MPC; JPL
658919	2017 XT_{72}	—	December 13, 2017	Mount Lemmon	Mount Lemmon Survey	THB	2.1 km	MPC; JPL
658920	2017 XN_{73}	—	December 13, 2017	Mount Lemmon	Mount Lemmon Survey	·	2.7 km	MPC; JPL
658921	2017 XO_{79}	—	December 15, 2017	Mount Lemmon	Mount Lemmon Survey	·	2.1 km	MPC; JPL
658922	2017 XQ_{79}	—	December 13, 2017	Mount Lemmon	Mount Lemmon Survey	·	1.8 km	MPC; JPL
658923	2017 XQ_{86}	—	December 14, 2017	Mount Lemmon	Mount Lemmon Survey	·	2.2 km	MPC; JPL
658924	2017 YS	—	December 21, 2017	Mount Lemmon	Mount Lemmon Survey	·	720 m	MPC; JPL
658925	2017 YH_{3}	—	December 13, 2003	Socorro	LINEAR	·	1.1 km	MPC; JPL
658926	2017 YT_{9}	—	July 27, 2005	Palomar	NEAT	·	3.3 km	MPC; JPL
658927	2017 YR_{12}	—	September 6, 2016	Mount Lemmon	Mount Lemmon Survey	·	2.6 km	MPC; JPL
658928	2017 YV_{14}	—	December 21, 2006	Palomar	NEAT	·	3.4 km	MPC; JPL
658929	2017 YS_{22}	—	February 11, 2008	Mount Lemmon	Mount Lemmon Survey	·	2.1 km	MPC; JPL
658930	2017 YH_{24}	—	December 25, 2017	Haleakala	Pan-STARRS 1	·	2.0 km	MPC; JPL
658931	2017 YG_{25}	—	August 30, 2016	Haleakala	Pan-STARRS 1	·	2.5 km	MPC; JPL
658932	2017 YE_{41}	—	December 23, 2017	Mount Lemmon	Mount Lemmon Survey	·	840 m	MPC; JPL
658933	2017 YO_{45}	—	November 3, 2011	Mount Lemmon	Mount Lemmon Survey	·	2.3 km	MPC; JPL
658934	2017 YY_{47}	—	December 23, 2017	Haleakala	Pan-STARRS 1	·	1.7 km	MPC; JPL
658935	2017 YV_{50}	—	February 7, 2008	Kitt Peak	Spacewatch	·	1.9 km	MPC; JPL
658936	2017 YV_{58}	—	March 8, 2013	Haleakala	Pan-STARRS 1	VER	1.9 km	MPC; JPL
658937	2017 YC_{62}	—	December 28, 2017	Mount Lemmon	Mount Lemmon Survey	T_{j} (2.99)	2.9 km	MPC; JPL
658938	2017 YM_{64}	—	December 26, 2017	Mount Lemmon	Mount Lemmon Survey	·	1.5 km	MPC; JPL
658939	2018 AD_{1}	—	April 20, 2013	Mount Lemmon	Mount Lemmon Survey	H	430 m	MPC; JPL
658940	2018 AK_{4}	—	January 8, 2007	Socorro	LINEAR	PHO	1.4 km	MPC; JPL
658941	2018 AM_{4}	—	October 27, 2006	Mount Lemmon	Mount Lemmon Survey	·	2.3 km	MPC; JPL
658942	2018 AS_{6}	—	November 17, 2011	Kitt Peak	Spacewatch	·	2.1 km	MPC; JPL
658943	2018 AW_{6}	—	November 12, 2006	Mount Lemmon	Mount Lemmon Survey	·	710 m	MPC; JPL
658944	2018 AF_{7}	—	February 20, 2001	Kitt Peak	Spacewatch	·	2.6 km	MPC; JPL
658945	2018 AA_{14}	—	October 31, 2006	Mount Lemmon	Mount Lemmon Survey	·	550 m	MPC; JPL
658946	2018 AN_{16}	—	July 14, 2016	Mount Lemmon	Mount Lemmon Survey	·	2.7 km	MPC; JPL
658947	2018 AV_{17}	—	January 15, 2018	Haleakala	Pan-STARRS 1	·	2.6 km	MPC; JPL
658948	2018 AK_{18}	—	June 8, 2013	Palomar	Palomar Transient Factory	·	3.8 km	MPC; JPL
658949	2018 AG_{67}	—	January 15, 2018	Haleakala	Pan-STARRS 1	3:2	4.9 km	MPC; JPL
658950	2018 BA_{8}	—	December 6, 2011	Haleakala	Pan-STARRS 1	·	2.4 km	MPC; JPL
658951	2018 BC_{8}	—	December 15, 2006	Mount Lemmon	Mount Lemmon Survey	·	2.4 km	MPC; JPL
658952	2018 BJ_{9}	—	March 26, 2001	Kitt Peak	Spacewatch	·	630 m	MPC; JPL
658953	2018 BO_{9}	—	April 1, 2008	Kitt Peak	Spacewatch	·	3.3 km	MPC; JPL
658954	2018 BR_{9}	—	March 9, 2003	Kitt Peak	Spacewatch	·	1.0 km	MPC; JPL
658955	2018 BH_{10}	—	February 16, 2007	Catalina	CSS	EUP	3.2 km	MPC; JPL
658956	2018 BR_{11}	—	May 20, 2015	Cerro Tololo	DECam	VER	1.8 km	MPC; JPL
658957	2018 BC_{12}	—	April 20, 2015	Cerro Paranal	Altmann, M., Prusti, T.	·	830 m	MPC; JPL
658958	2018 BH_{40}	—	January 16, 2018	Haleakala	Pan-STARRS 1	·	2.8 km	MPC; JPL
658959	2018 CY_{6}	—	February 20, 2001	Apache Point	SDSS	·	3.0 km	MPC; JPL
658960	2018 CR_{8}	—	January 13, 2012	La Sagra	OAM	·	2.7 km	MPC; JPL
658961	2018 CE_{9}	—	November 22, 2006	Kitt Peak	Spacewatch	NYS	730 m	MPC; JPL
658962	2018 CA_{10}	—	December 29, 2011	Kitt Peak	Spacewatch	·	2.8 km	MPC; JPL
658963	2018 CB_{16}	—	February 26, 2007	Mount Lemmon	Mount Lemmon Survey	·	2.5 km	MPC; JPL
658964	2018 CO_{20}	—	February 10, 2018	Haleakala	Pan-STARRS 1	·	2.4 km	MPC; JPL
658965	2018 DH_{4}	—	December 5, 2007	Mount Lemmon	Mount Lemmon Survey	·	560 m	MPC; JPL
658966	2018 DM_{9}	—	March 27, 2012	Haleakala	Pan-STARRS 1	·	3.7 km	MPC; JPL
658967	2018 DC_{10}	—	October 17, 2012	Haleakala	Pan-STARRS 1	·	1.1 km	MPC; JPL
658968	2018 DF_{10}	—	February 3, 2012	Haleakala	Pan-STARRS 1	·	2.7 km	MPC; JPL
658969	2018 DK_{11}	—	February 23, 2018	Mount Lemmon	Mount Lemmon Survey	·	2.5 km	MPC; JPL
658970	2018 EG_{10}	—	March 10, 2018	Haleakala	Pan-STARRS 1	·	610 m	MPC; JPL
658971	2018 EE_{13}	—	March 7, 2018	Haleakala	Pan-STARRS 1	·	510 m	MPC; JPL
658972	2018 FX_{5}	—	November 27, 2013	Haleakala	Pan-STARRS 1	·	560 m	MPC; JPL
658973	2018 FK_{8}	—	August 13, 2004	Cerro Tololo	Deep Ecliptic Survey	·	2.0 km	MPC; JPL
658974	2018 FP_{8}	—	September 23, 2008	Kitt Peak	Spacewatch	(5)	1.0 km	MPC; JPL
658975	2018 FM_{9}	—	March 9, 2007	Mount Lemmon	Mount Lemmon Survey	NYS	860 m	MPC; JPL
658976	2018 FD_{10}	—	April 20, 2012	Kitt Peak	Spacewatch	·	750 m	MPC; JPL
658977	2018 FB_{13}	—	November 7, 2015	Mount Lemmon	Mount Lemmon Survey	·	3.0 km	MPC; JPL
658978	2018 FJ_{13}	—	December 31, 2013	Mount Lemmon	Mount Lemmon Survey	·	550 m	MPC; JPL
658979	2018 FH_{15}	—	March 9, 2007	Kitt Peak	Spacewatch	·	3.5 km	MPC; JPL
658980	2018 FZ_{42}	—	March 16, 2018	Mount Lemmon	Mount Lemmon Survey	·	2.7 km	MPC; JPL
658981	2018 FZ_{54}	—	October 11, 2012	Mount Lemmon	Mount Lemmon Survey	L5	6.9 km	MPC; JPL
658982	2018 GZ_{2}	—	December 12, 2002	Palomar	NEAT	·	620 m	MPC; JPL
658983	2018 GG_{10}	—	October 18, 2009	Mount Lemmon	Mount Lemmon Survey	·	700 m	MPC; JPL
658984	2018 GU_{15}	—	April 14, 2018	Mount Lemmon	Mount Lemmon Survey	·	750 m	MPC; JPL
658985	2018 GW_{15}	—	September 24, 2008	Mount Lemmon	Mount Lemmon Survey	·	790 m	MPC; JPL
658986	2018 GG_{17}	—	April 13, 2018	Haleakala	Pan-STARRS 1	3:2 · (3561)	4.7 km	MPC; JPL
658987	2018 GU_{17}	—	April 12, 2018	Haleakala	Pan-STARRS 1	·	620 m	MPC; JPL
658988	2018 GB_{21}	—	April 12, 2018	Haleakala	Pan-STARRS 1	·	630 m	MPC; JPL
658989	2018 HR_{2}	—	May 22, 2001	Anderson Mesa	LONEOS	T_{j} (2.99) · EUP	4.4 km	MPC; JPL
658990	2018 JN_{2}	—	October 13, 2015	Haleakala	Pan-STARRS 1	PHO	740 m	MPC; JPL
658991	2018 JF_{9}	—	May 15, 2018	Mount Lemmon	Mount Lemmon Survey	·	490 m	MPC; JPL
658992	2018 KL_{8}	—	May 21, 2018	Haleakala	Pan-STARRS 1	·	560 m	MPC; JPL
658993	2018 KA_{12}	—	January 3, 2017	Haleakala	Pan-STARRS 1	·	2.7 km	MPC; JPL
658994	2018 LM_{8}	—	April 22, 2009	Mount Lemmon	Mount Lemmon Survey	BAR	980 m	MPC; JPL
658995	2018 LT_{11}	—	October 20, 2008	Mount Lemmon	Mount Lemmon Survey	·	700 m	MPC; JPL
658996	2018 LY_{11}	—	April 29, 2014	Haleakala	Pan-STARRS 1	·	1.0 km	MPC; JPL
658997	2018 LY_{13}	—	September 15, 2009	Mount Lemmon	Mount Lemmon Survey	·	1.4 km	MPC; JPL
658998	2018 LO_{14}	—	April 19, 2007	Kitt Peak	Spacewatch	·	950 m	MPC; JPL
658999	2018 LH_{15}	—	January 17, 2013	Haleakala	Pan-STARRS 1	·	1.1 km	MPC; JPL
659000	2018 LB_{25}	—	June 15, 2018	Haleakala	Pan-STARRS 1	L4	6.6 km	MPC; JPL

back to top

== Meaning of names ==
As minor planet discoveries are confirmed, they are given a permanent number by the IAU's Minor Planet Center (MPC), and the discoverers can then submit names for them, following the IAU's naming conventions. The list below concerns those minor planets in the specified number-range that have received names, and explains the meanings of those names.

Official naming citations of newly named small Solar System bodies are approved and published in a bulletin by IAU's Working Group for Small Bodies Nomenclature (WGSBN). Before May 2021, citations were published in MPC's Minor Planet Circulars for many decades. Recent citations can also be found on the JPL Small-Body Database (SBDB). Until his death in 2016, German astronomer Lutz D. Schmadel compiled these citations into the Dictionary of Minor Planet Names (DMP) and regularly updated the collection.

Based on Paul Herget's The Names of the Minor Planets, Schmadel also researched the unclear origin of numerous asteroids, most of which had been named prior to World War II. This article incorporates text from this source, which is in the public domain: SBDB New namings may only be added to this list below after official publication as the preannouncement of names is condemned. The WGSBN publishes a comprehensive guideline for the naming rules of non-cometary small Solar System bodies.

Named minor planet	Provisional	This minor planet was named for...	Ref; Catalog
658129 Zwitter	2017 HV_{78}	Tomaž Zwitter, Slovenian astrophysicist at the University of Ljubljana	IAU · 658129
658398 Lufonds	2017 RE_{3}	Latvijas Universitātes Fonds, a Latvian foundation that provides patrons and cooperation partners with the opportunity to support the best students, researchers, and projects.	IAU · 658398
658642 Carreira	2017 SK_{134}	Emanuel Carreira Vérez (1931–2020) was a Jesuit astrophysicist who collaborated with Clyde Cowan on cosmic rays.	IAU · 658642
658787 Alksnis	2017 UM_{95}	Andrejs Alksnis (1928–2017), a Latvian astronomer	IAU · 658787
658882 Žemaitija	2017 WV_{90}	Žemaitija or Samogitia is one of the five cultural regions of Lithuania and formerly one of the two core administrative divisions of the Grand Duchy of Lithuania alongside Lithuania proper.	IAU · 658882
