= List of minor planets: 649001–650000 =

The following is a partial list of minor planets, running from minor-planet number 649001 through 650000, inclusive. The primary data for this and other partial lists is based on JPL's "Small-Body Orbital Elements" and data available from the Minor Planet Center. Critical list information is also provided by the MPC, unless otherwise specified from Lowell Observatory. A detailed description of the table's columns and additional sources are given on the main page including a complete list of every page in this series, and a statistical break-up on the dynamical classification of minor planets.

Also see the summary list of all named bodies in numerical and alphabetical order, and the corresponding naming citations for the number range of this particular list. New namings may only be added to this list after official publication, as the preannouncement of names is condemned by the Working Group for Small Bodies Nomenclature of the International Astronomical Union.

Near-Earth obj.	MBA (inner)	MBA (outer)	Centaur
Mars-crosser	MBA (middle)	Jupiter trojan	Trans-Neptunian obj.
Unclassified

== 649001–649100 ==
Designation			Discovery			Properties		Ref
Permanent	Provisional	Named after	Date	Site	Discoverer(s)	Category	Diam.	Ref
649001	2010 TL_{186}	—	November 4, 2010	Mount Lemmon	Mount Lemmon Survey	·	1.2 km	MPC · JPL
649002	2010 TG_{193}	—	November 19, 2007	Mount Lemmon	Mount Lemmon Survey	·	720 m	MPC · JPL
649003	2010 TE_{195}	—	October 2, 2010	Kitt Peak	Spacewatch	·	980 m	MPC · JPL
649004	2010 TJ_{195}	—	August 15, 2001	Haleakala	NEAT	·	1.1 km	MPC · JPL
649005	2010 TC_{197}	—	March 17, 2012	Mount Lemmon	Mount Lemmon Survey	V	550 m	MPC · JPL
649006	2010 TC_{198}	—	October 9, 2010	Mount Lemmon	Mount Lemmon Survey	·	540 m	MPC · JPL
649007	2010 TU_{198}	—	October 11, 2010	Mount Lemmon	Mount Lemmon Survey	·	1.1 km	MPC · JPL
649008	2010 TC_{206}	—	October 9, 2010	Mount Lemmon	Mount Lemmon Survey	·	2.9 km	MPC · JPL
649009	2010 TJ_{212}	—	October 9, 2010	Mount Lemmon	Mount Lemmon Survey	·	1.1 km	MPC · JPL
649010	2010 TN_{212}	—	October 9, 2010	Kitt Peak	Spacewatch	·	940 m	MPC · JPL
649011	2010 TT_{212}	—	October 2, 2010	Mount Lemmon	Mount Lemmon Survey	·	1.1 km	MPC · JPL
649012	2010 TK_{217}	—	October 14, 2010	Mount Lemmon	Mount Lemmon Survey	·	2.7 km	MPC · JPL
649013	2010 TU_{217}	—	October 12, 2010	Mount Lemmon	Mount Lemmon Survey	H	410 m	MPC · JPL
649014	2010 TW_{221}	—	October 13, 2010	Mount Lemmon	Mount Lemmon Survey	L4	7.4 km	MPC · JPL
649015	2010 TY_{221}	—	October 13, 2010	Mount Lemmon	Mount Lemmon Survey	L4	7.7 km	MPC · JPL
649016	2010 TK_{224}	—	October 14, 2010	Mount Lemmon	Mount Lemmon Survey	·	1.1 km	MPC · JPL
649017	2010 TO_{224}	—	January 18, 2008	Kitt Peak	Spacewatch	·	760 m	MPC · JPL
649018	2010 TP_{224}	—	October 13, 2010	Mount Lemmon	Mount Lemmon Survey	·	2.4 km	MPC · JPL
649019	2010 TH_{227}	—	October 14, 2010	Mount Lemmon	Mount Lemmon Survey	·	2.0 km	MPC · JPL
649020	2010 TP_{229}	—	October 11, 2010	Mount Lemmon	Mount Lemmon Survey	HYG	2.4 km	MPC · JPL
649021	2010 TV_{230}	—	October 14, 2010	Mount Lemmon	Mount Lemmon Survey	·	660 m	MPC · JPL
649022	2010 UZ_{10}	—	September 11, 2010	Mount Lemmon	Mount Lemmon Survey	·	990 m	MPC · JPL
649023	2010 UF_{11}	—	December 13, 2006	Catalina	CSS	·	990 m	MPC · JPL
649024	2010 UK_{24}	—	October 28, 2010	Mount Lemmon	Mount Lemmon Survey	·	1.0 km	MPC · JPL
649025	2010 UY_{27}	—	December 31, 2007	Kitt Peak	Spacewatch	·	570 m	MPC · JPL
649026	2010 UB_{29}	—	August 16, 2001	Palomar	NEAT	·	1.3 km	MPC · JPL
649027	2010 UF_{39}	—	October 23, 2006	Kitt Peak	Spacewatch	(5)	980 m	MPC · JPL
649028	2010 UZ_{40}	—	October 30, 2010	Piszkés-tető	K. Sárneczky, Z. Kuli	NYS	760 m	MPC · JPL
649029	2010 UR_{44}	—	October 12, 2010	Kitt Peak	Spacewatch	·	1.2 km	MPC · JPL
649030	2010 UL_{47}	—	September 18, 2010	Mount Lemmon	Mount Lemmon Survey	·	2.7 km	MPC · JPL
649031	2010 UB_{50}	—	November 19, 2006	Kitt Peak	Spacewatch	·	1.1 km	MPC · JPL
649032	2010 UK_{50}	—	October 31, 2010	Kitt Peak	Spacewatch	·	1.1 km	MPC · JPL
649033	2010 UN_{56}	—	September 11, 2010	Mount Lemmon	Mount Lemmon Survey	·	1.2 km	MPC · JPL
649034	2010 UZ_{62}	—	January 26, 2003	Anderson Mesa	LONEOS	·	1.7 km	MPC · JPL
649035	2010 UH_{63}	—	October 23, 2006	Mount Lemmon	Mount Lemmon Survey	·	1.5 km	MPC · JPL
649036	2010 UQ_{63}	—	February 6, 2007	Kitt Peak	Spacewatch	·	2.9 km	MPC · JPL
649037	2010 UA_{64}	—	October 31, 2010	Piszkés-tető	K. Sárneczky, S. Kürti	(5)	1.0 km	MPC · JPL
649038	2010 UH_{68}	—	October 31, 2010	Piszkéstető	K. Sárneczky, Z. Kuli	·	1.2 km	MPC · JPL
649039	2010 UY_{72}	—	October 29, 2010	Kitt Peak	Spacewatch	·	540 m	MPC · JPL
649040	2010 UU_{86}	—	November 12, 2006	Mount Lemmon	Mount Lemmon Survey	·	1.0 km	MPC · JPL
649041	2010 UB_{94}	—	October 18, 2006	Kitt Peak	Spacewatch	(5)	1.0 km	MPC · JPL
649042	2010 UA_{100}	—	October 30, 2010	Mount Lemmon	Mount Lemmon Survey	H	400 m	MPC · JPL
649043	2010 UV_{100}	—	October 13, 2010	Mount Lemmon	Mount Lemmon Survey	·	1.3 km	MPC · JPL
649044	2010 UP_{112}	—	September 19, 2014	Haleakala	Pan-STARRS 1	HNS	980 m	MPC · JPL
649045	2010 UL_{121}	—	October 17, 2010	Mount Lemmon	Mount Lemmon Survey	·	2.8 km	MPC · JPL
649046	2010 UU_{126}	—	October 28, 2010	Mount Lemmon	Mount Lemmon Survey	·	2.5 km	MPC · JPL
649047	2010 UY_{128}	—	October 19, 2010	Mount Lemmon	Mount Lemmon Survey	·	2.6 km	MPC · JPL
649048	2010 UD_{131}	—	October 17, 2010	Mount Lemmon	Mount Lemmon Survey	·	2.9 km	MPC · JPL
649049	2010 UR_{131}	—	October 17, 2010	Mount Lemmon	Mount Lemmon Survey	·	2.5 km	MPC · JPL
649050	2010 UQ_{134}	—	October 31, 2010	Kitt Peak	Spacewatch	·	460 m	MPC · JPL
649051	2010 VF_{5}	—	November 1, 2010	Mount Lemmon	Mount Lemmon Survey	EUN	1.0 km	MPC · JPL
649052	2010 VA_{6}	—	March 29, 2008	Kitt Peak	Spacewatch	·	1.0 km	MPC · JPL
649053	2010 VN_{14}	—	January 24, 2003	La Silla	A. Boattini, Hainaut, O.	(5)	1.1 km	MPC · JPL
649054	2010 VJ_{15}	—	November 1, 2010	Bisei	BATTeRS	EUN	920 m	MPC · JPL
649055	2010 VO_{17}	—	November 2, 2010	Socorro	LINEAR	H	490 m	MPC · JPL
649056	2010 VE_{24}	—	October 2, 2010	Mount Lemmon	Mount Lemmon Survey	·	1.2 km	MPC · JPL
649057	2010 VN_{27}	—	October 13, 2010	Catalina	CSS	NYS	1.1 km	MPC · JPL
649058	2010 VO_{32}	—	May 3, 2008	Mount Lemmon	Mount Lemmon Survey	·	1.2 km	MPC · JPL
649059	2010 VV_{33}	—	September 8, 2010	Charleston	R. Holmes	·	1.3 km	MPC · JPL
649060	2010 VK_{42}	—	September 18, 2010	Mount Lemmon	Mount Lemmon Survey	·	1.0 km	MPC · JPL
649061	2010 VU_{43}	—	November 1, 2010	Mount Lemmon	Mount Lemmon Survey	·	1.4 km	MPC · JPL
649062	2010 VK_{49}	—	November 3, 2010	Kitt Peak	Spacewatch	·	880 m	MPC · JPL
649063	2010 VU_{52}	—	November 3, 2010	Mount Lemmon	Mount Lemmon Survey	THM	2.3 km	MPC · JPL
649064	2010 VY_{53}	—	November 3, 2010	Mount Lemmon	Mount Lemmon Survey	·	470 m	MPC · JPL
649065	2010 VM_{55}	—	September 11, 2010	Mount Lemmon	Mount Lemmon Survey	·	1.6 km	MPC · JPL
649066	2010 VF_{58}	—	November 30, 2005	Kitt Peak	Spacewatch	VER	2.7 km	MPC · JPL
649067	2010 VC_{69}	—	November 4, 2010	Mayhill-ISON	L. Elenin	·	1.3 km	MPC · JPL
649068	2010 VP_{69}	—	October 31, 2010	Piszkés-tető	K. Sárneczky, Z. Kuli	·	890 m	MPC · JPL
649069	2010 VN_{75}	—	November 27, 2006	Kitt Peak	Spacewatch	·	1.1 km	MPC · JPL
649070	2010 VJ_{78}	—	November 15, 2001	Kitt Peak	Spacewatch	·	1.4 km	MPC · JPL
649071	2010 VB_{83}	—	November 5, 2010	Les Engarouines	L. Bernasconi	(5)	930 m	MPC · JPL
649072	2010 VT_{85}	—	October 28, 2010	Kitt Peak	Spacewatch	·	1.2 km	MPC · JPL
649073	2010 VA_{93}	—	November 7, 2010	Mount Lemmon	Mount Lemmon Survey	·	2.9 km	MPC · JPL
649074	2010 VU_{95}	—	October 29, 2010	Kitt Peak	Spacewatch	·	1.4 km	MPC · JPL
649075	2010 VS_{99}	—	November 4, 2010	Mount Lemmon	Mount Lemmon Survey	·	1.5 km	MPC · JPL
649076	2010 VJ_{100}	—	November 16, 2006	Kitt Peak	Spacewatch	·	1.4 km	MPC · JPL
649077	2010 VK_{102}	—	September 12, 2001	Kitt Peak	Spacewatch	·	1.1 km	MPC · JPL
649078	2010 VH_{109}	—	November 6, 2010	Mount Lemmon	Mount Lemmon Survey	L4	7.0 km	MPC · JPL
649079	2010 VM_{113}	—	October 30, 2010	Kitt Peak	Spacewatch	·	940 m	MPC · JPL
649080	2010 VB_{117}	—	October 10, 2010	Kitt Peak	Spacewatch	V	630 m	MPC · JPL
649081	2010 VZ_{117}	—	February 27, 2008	Mount Lemmon	Mount Lemmon Survey	·	1.5 km	MPC · JPL
649082	2010 VP_{119}	—	April 14, 2008	Mount Lemmon	Mount Lemmon Survey	·	1.4 km	MPC · JPL
649083	2010 VX_{119}	—	August 28, 2006	Kitt Peak	Spacewatch	·	1.1 km	MPC · JPL
649084	2010 VO_{123}	—	February 4, 2003	Haleakala	NEAT	·	1.5 km	MPC · JPL
649085	2010 VY_{126}	—	November 8, 2010	Charleston	R. Holmes	·	1.6 km	MPC · JPL
649086	2010 VB_{127}	—	March 5, 2008	Mount Lemmon	Mount Lemmon Survey	·	1.2 km	MPC · JPL
649087	2010 VU_{128}	—	November 2, 2010	Mount Lemmon	Mount Lemmon Survey	·	1.1 km	MPC · JPL
649088	2010 VV_{130}	—	October 12, 2010	Mount Lemmon	Mount Lemmon Survey	·	2.8 km	MPC · JPL
649089	2010 VS_{131}	—	December 24, 2006	Kitt Peak	Spacewatch	·	1.1 km	MPC · JPL
649090	2010 VC_{139}	—	August 25, 2001	Kitt Peak	Spacewatch	·	1.2 km	MPC · JPL
649091	2010 VT_{139}	—	October 7, 2002	Haleakala	NEAT	BAR	1.2 km	MPC · JPL
649092	2010 VM_{163}	—	November 10, 2010	Kitt Peak	Spacewatch	L4	6.4 km	MPC · JPL
649093	2010 VV_{165}	—	September 20, 2006	Catalina	CSS	·	1.0 km	MPC · JPL
649094	2010 VD_{166}	—	October 14, 2001	Kitt Peak	Spacewatch	·	1.2 km	MPC · JPL
649095	2010 VL_{166}	—	November 10, 2010	Mount Lemmon	Mount Lemmon Survey	·	890 m	MPC · JPL
649096	2010 VN_{172}	—	November 10, 2010	Mount Lemmon	Mount Lemmon Survey	·	530 m	MPC · JPL
649097	2010 VT_{179}	—	November 11, 2010	Mount Lemmon	Mount Lemmon Survey	·	1.2 km	MPC · JPL
649098	2010 VZ_{180}	—	November 11, 2010	Mount Lemmon	Mount Lemmon Survey	·	1.2 km	MPC · JPL
649099	2010 VT_{185}	—	October 30, 2010	Mount Lemmon	Mount Lemmon Survey	L4	6.2 km	MPC · JPL
649100	2010 VD_{186}	—	November 13, 2010	Mount Lemmon	Mount Lemmon Survey	·	530 m	MPC · JPL

== 649101–649200 ==
back to top

Designation			Discovery			Properties		Ref
Permanent	Provisional	Named after	Date	Site	Discoverer(s)	Category	Diam.	Ref
649101	2010 VS_{194}	—	August 1, 2001	Palomar	NEAT	JUN	940 m	MPC · JPL
649102	2010 VU_{197}	—	October 30, 2010	Mount Lemmon	Mount Lemmon Survey	·	1.2 km	MPC · JPL
649103	2010 VX_{198}	—	October 29, 2010	Kitt Peak	Spacewatch	·	810 m	MPC · JPL
649104	2010 VA_{201}	—	November 12, 2010	Mount Lemmon	Mount Lemmon Survey	JUN	1.3 km	MPC · JPL
649105	2010 VR_{201}	—	November 2, 2010	Mount Lemmon	Mount Lemmon Survey	·	1.4 km	MPC · JPL
649106	2010 VB_{208}	—	October 31, 2010	Mount Lemmon	Mount Lemmon Survey	·	980 m	MPC · JPL
649107	2010 VB_{210}	—	November 7, 2007	Kitt Peak	Spacewatch	·	780 m	MPC · JPL
649108	2010 VE_{216}	—	February 3, 2012	Haleakala	Pan-STARRS 1	·	1.4 km	MPC · JPL
649109	2010 VR_{217}	—	November 2, 2010	Kitt Peak	Spacewatch	·	1.4 km	MPC · JPL
649110	2010 VZ_{218}	—	November 8, 2010	Kitt Peak	Spacewatch	·	1.2 km	MPC · JPL
649111	2010 VE_{229}	—	November 2, 2010	Mount Lemmon	Mount Lemmon Survey	·	920 m	MPC · JPL
649112	2010 VP_{229}	—	September 19, 2014	Haleakala	Pan-STARRS 1	·	1.6 km	MPC · JPL
649113	2010 VF_{230}	—	November 14, 2010	Catalina	CSS	·	1.3 km	MPC · JPL
649114	2010 VG_{233}	—	April 11, 2002	Socorro	LINEAR	·	2.8 km	MPC · JPL
649115	2010 VA_{235}	—	November 2, 2010	Mount Lemmon	Mount Lemmon Survey	JUN	770 m	MPC · JPL
649116	2010 VE_{244}	—	November 5, 2010	Mount Lemmon	Mount Lemmon Survey	·	2.2 km	MPC · JPL
649117	2010 VF_{246}	—	January 4, 2016	Haleakala	Pan-STARRS 1	·	1.8 km	MPC · JPL
649118	2010 VH_{250}	—	November 2, 2010	Kitt Peak	Spacewatch	·	430 m	MPC · JPL
649119	2010 VT_{250}	—	November 4, 2010	Mount Lemmon	Mount Lemmon Survey	·	2.6 km	MPC · JPL
649120	2010 VY_{250}	—	October 5, 2018	Mount Lemmon	Mount Lemmon Survey	·	980 m	MPC · JPL
649121	2010 VJ_{252}	—	November 8, 2010	Kitt Peak	Spacewatch	·	980 m	MPC · JPL
649122	2010 VS_{253}	—	November 1, 2010	Kitt Peak	Spacewatch	L4	9.0 km	MPC · JPL
649123	2010 VL_{256}	—	November 6, 2010	Mount Lemmon	Mount Lemmon Survey	·	2.8 km	MPC · JPL
649124	2010 VW_{257}	—	November 3, 2010	Kitt Peak	Spacewatch	L4	6.5 km	MPC · JPL
649125	2010 VC_{263}	—	November 10, 2010	Mount Lemmon	Mount Lemmon Survey	L4	7.1 km	MPC · JPL
649126	2010 VZ_{263}	—	November 10, 2010	Mount Lemmon	Mount Lemmon Survey	EUN	820 m	MPC · JPL
649127	2010 VL_{264}	—	November 2, 2010	Mount Lemmon	Mount Lemmon Survey	·	880 m	MPC · JPL
649128	2010 VJ_{270}	—	November 11, 2010	Mount Lemmon	Mount Lemmon Survey	L4	6.0 km	MPC · JPL
649129	2010 VQ_{277}	—	November 8, 2010	Mount Lemmon	Mount Lemmon Survey	·	550 m	MPC · JPL
649130	2010 VV_{280}	—	November 1, 2010	Mount Lemmon	Mount Lemmon Survey	·	2.4 km	MPC · JPL
649131	2010 WC_{6}	—	November 27, 2010	Mount Lemmon	Mount Lemmon Survey	·	1 km	MPC · JPL
649132	2010 WZ_{7}	—	October 30, 2010	Mount Lemmon	Mount Lemmon Survey	·	1.3 km	MPC · JPL
649133	2010 WV_{15}	—	November 26, 2010	Mount Lemmon	Mount Lemmon Survey	·	1.1 km	MPC · JPL
649134	2010 WW_{19}	—	November 27, 2010	Mount Lemmon	Mount Lemmon Survey	·	2.0 km	MPC · JPL
649135	2010 WX_{19}	—	August 6, 2005	Siding Spring	SSS	·	2.0 km	MPC · JPL
649136	2010 WB_{30}	—	November 27, 2010	Mount Lemmon	Mount Lemmon Survey	L4	5.8 km	MPC · JPL
649137	2010 WC_{37}	—	November 27, 2010	Mount Lemmon	Mount Lemmon Survey	·	1.1 km	MPC · JPL
649138	2010 WV_{41}	—	November 27, 2010	Mount Lemmon	Mount Lemmon Survey	·	1.1 km	MPC · JPL
649139	2010 WX_{45}	—	September 23, 2005	Catalina	CSS	·	1.4 km	MPC · JPL
649140	2010 WO_{47}	—	November 14, 2010	Kitt Peak	Spacewatch	·	1.1 km	MPC · JPL
649141	2010 WJ_{52}	—	October 28, 2010	Kitt Peak	Spacewatch	·	1.1 km	MPC · JPL
649142	2010 WF_{56}	—	January 25, 2003	Palomar	NEAT	·	1.3 km	MPC · JPL
649143	2010 WO_{67}	—	November 27, 2006	Mount Lemmon	Mount Lemmon Survey	·	1.2 km	MPC · JPL
649144	2010 WP_{67}	—	November 30, 2010	Mount Lemmon	Mount Lemmon Survey	·	1.1 km	MPC · JPL
649145	2010 WC_{68}	—	November 30, 2010	Mount Lemmon	Mount Lemmon Survey	·	1.3 km	MPC · JPL
649146	2010 WS_{75}	—	March 30, 2012	Kitt Peak	Spacewatch	·	1.3 km	MPC · JPL
649147	2010 WK_{79}	—	November 25, 2010	Mount Lemmon	Mount Lemmon Survey	·	490 m	MPC · JPL
649148	2010 XT_{2}	—	November 13, 2010	Mount Lemmon	Mount Lemmon Survey	H	510 m	MPC · JPL
649149	2010 XV_{6}	—	November 12, 2010	Mount Lemmon	Mount Lemmon Survey	·	1.4 km	MPC · JPL
649150	2010 XH_{9}	—	October 19, 2010	Mount Lemmon	Mount Lemmon Survey	·	1.4 km	MPC · JPL
649151	2010 XR_{12}	—	January 24, 2007	Kitt Peak	Spacewatch	·	1.0 km	MPC · JPL
649152	2010 XU_{22}	—	October 13, 2010	Mount Lemmon	Mount Lemmon Survey	·	1.5 km	MPC · JPL
649153	2010 XW_{26}	—	October 14, 2010	Mount Lemmon	Mount Lemmon Survey	·	1.1 km	MPC · JPL
649154	2010 XN_{28}	—	July 24, 2000	Kitt Peak	Spacewatch	·	590 m	MPC · JPL
649155	2010 XN_{29}	—	September 12, 2005	Kitt Peak	Spacewatch	·	1.3 km	MPC · JPL
649156	2010 XM_{33}	—	December 2, 2010	Mount Lemmon	Mount Lemmon Survey	·	3.2 km	MPC · JPL
649157	2010 XW_{40}	—	December 4, 2010	Piszkés-tető	K. Sárneczky, Z. Kuli	·	1.1 km	MPC · JPL
649158	2010 XF_{42}	—	December 5, 2010	Kitt Peak	Spacewatch	·	490 m	MPC · JPL
649159	2010 XU_{42}	—	November 11, 2010	Mount Lemmon	Mount Lemmon Survey	·	1.7 km	MPC · JPL
649160	2010 XU_{43}	—	February 23, 2003	Kitt Peak	Spacewatch	·	1.2 km	MPC · JPL
649161	2010 XD_{44}	—	August 21, 2006	Kitt Peak	Spacewatch	·	1.0 km	MPC · JPL
649162	2010 XP_{49}	—	November 4, 2010	Mayhill-ISON	L. Elenin	(5)	1.1 km	MPC · JPL
649163	2010 XT_{52}	—	September 21, 2009	Mount Lemmon	Mount Lemmon Survey	L4	5.4 km	MPC · JPL
649164	2010 XC_{54}	—	October 1, 2005	Mount Lemmon	Mount Lemmon Survey	·	1.2 km	MPC · JPL
649165	2010 XP_{54}	—	November 2, 2010	Mount Lemmon	Mount Lemmon Survey	BAR	1.4 km	MPC · JPL
649166	2010 XD_{55}	—	December 10, 2010	Mount Lemmon	Mount Lemmon Survey	·	3.9 km	MPC · JPL
649167	2010 XZ_{55}	—	December 1, 2010	Mount Lemmon	Mount Lemmon Survey	·	1.3 km	MPC · JPL
649168	2010 XD_{56}	—	November 12, 2010	Charleston	R. Holmes	L4	7.7 km	MPC · JPL
649169	2010 XS_{66}	—	September 24, 2008	Mount Lemmon	Mount Lemmon Survey	L4	7.0 km	MPC · JPL
649170	2010 XT_{84}	—	November 17, 2006	Mount Lemmon	Mount Lemmon Survey	(5)	990 m	MPC · JPL
649171	2010 XB_{86}	—	December 2, 2010	Mount Lemmon	Mount Lemmon Survey	·	1.4 km	MPC · JPL
649172	2010 XE_{91}	—	December 5, 2010	Haleakala	Pan-STARRS 1	res · 1:3	170 km	MPC · JPL
649173	2010 XW_{93}	—	January 26, 2003	Palomar	NEAT	·	1.4 km	MPC · JPL
649174	2010 XE_{98}	—	October 19, 1995	Kitt Peak	Spacewatch	MAS	540 m	MPC · JPL
649175	2010 XE_{109}	—	December 10, 2010	Mount Lemmon	Mount Lemmon Survey	·	880 m	MPC · JPL
649176	2010 XP_{109}	—	December 3, 2010	Mount Lemmon	Mount Lemmon Survey	·	1.5 km	MPC · JPL
649177	2010 XK_{112}	—	December 5, 2010	Mount Lemmon	Mount Lemmon Survey	·	1.1 km	MPC · JPL
649178	2010 XR_{113}	—	December 3, 2010	Mount Lemmon	Mount Lemmon Survey	L4	5.1 km	MPC · JPL
649179	2010 XO_{118}	—	December 2, 2010	Dauban	C. Rinner, Kugel, F.	·	3.2 km	MPC · JPL
649180	2010 XG_{119}	—	December 4, 2010	Mount Lemmon	Mount Lemmon Survey	·	2.7 km	MPC · JPL
649181	2010 XK_{119}	—	December 2, 2010	Mount Lemmon	Mount Lemmon Survey	L4	6.2 km	MPC · JPL
649182	2010 XE_{122}	—	December 13, 2010	Mount Lemmon	Mount Lemmon Survey	·	530 m	MPC · JPL
649183	2010 YC_{2}	—	February 10, 2007	Catalina	CSS	·	2.0 km	MPC · JPL
649184	2010 YV_{4}	—	November 17, 2010	Mount Lemmon	Mount Lemmon Survey	·	1.3 km	MPC · JPL
649185	2010 YZ_{4}	—	October 14, 2004	Moletai	K. Černis, Zdanavicius, J.	·	3.4 km	MPC · JPL
649186	2011 AW_{3}	—	January 4, 2011	Mount Lemmon	Mount Lemmon Survey	·	460 m	MPC · JPL
649187	2011 AF_{6}	—	January 3, 2011	Piszkés-tető	K. Sárneczky, Z. Kuli	·	1.1 km	MPC · JPL
649188	2011 AN_{6}	—	September 10, 2001	Anderson Mesa	LONEOS	·	1.6 km	MPC · JPL
649189	2011 AK_{7}	—	December 27, 2006	Mount Lemmon	Mount Lemmon Survey	·	1 km	MPC · JPL
649190	2011 AH_{12}	—	December 15, 2010	Mount Lemmon	Mount Lemmon Survey	·	1.6 km	MPC · JPL
649191	2011 AH_{29}	—	December 25, 2010	Mount Lemmon	Mount Lemmon Survey	·	1.7 km	MPC · JPL
649192	2011 AU_{29}	—	January 8, 2011	Mount Lemmon	Mount Lemmon Survey	·	860 m	MPC · JPL
649193	2011 AQ_{30}	—	August 30, 2005	Kitt Peak	Spacewatch	·	1.2 km	MPC · JPL
649194	2011 AB_{31}	—	December 9, 2010	Mount Lemmon	Mount Lemmon Survey	·	1.3 km	MPC · JPL
649195	2011 AF_{34}	—	August 27, 2005	Palomar	NEAT	·	2.0 km	MPC · JPL
649196	2011 AD_{37}	—	January 13, 2011	Catalina	CSS	·	640 m	MPC · JPL
649197	2011 AC_{47}	—	January 10, 2011	Kitt Peak	Spacewatch	·	3.5 km	MPC · JPL
649198	2011 AC_{48}	—	April 10, 2003	Kitt Peak	Spacewatch	·	1.2 km	MPC · JPL
649199	2011 AH_{58}	—	January 11, 2011	Kitt Peak	Spacewatch	·	1.3 km	MPC · JPL
649200	2011 AA_{62}	—	January 13, 2011	Mount Lemmon	Mount Lemmon Survey	·	1.0 km	MPC · JPL

== 649201–649300 ==
back to top

Designation			Discovery			Properties		Ref
Permanent	Provisional	Named after	Date	Site	Discoverer(s)	Category	Diam.	Ref
649201	2011 AV_{66}	—	January 14, 2011	Kitt Peak	Spacewatch	·	1.1 km	MPC · JPL
649202	2011 AF_{70}	—	September 27, 2009	Mount Lemmon	Mount Lemmon Survey	·	1.1 km	MPC · JPL
649203	2011 AL_{70}	—	May 4, 2005	Kitt Peak	Spacewatch	·	740 m	MPC · JPL
649204	2011 AE_{75}	—	December 1, 2010	Mount Lemmon	Mount Lemmon Survey	(1547)	1.7 km	MPC · JPL
649205	2011 AU_{75}	—	September 28, 2001	Palomar	NEAT	·	1.4 km	MPC · JPL
649206	2011 AX_{78}	—	September 20, 2003	Kitt Peak	Spacewatch	·	470 m	MPC · JPL
649207	2011 AU_{81}	—	January 28, 2007	Kitt Peak	Spacewatch	·	1.3 km	MPC · JPL
649208	2011 AN_{84}	—	May 1, 2012	Mount Lemmon	Mount Lemmon Survey	·	620 m	MPC · JPL
649209	2011 AW_{85}	—	December 21, 2004	Catalina	CSS	T_{j} (2.99)	4.3 km	MPC · JPL
649210	2011 AP_{86}	—	June 12, 2004	Siding Spring	SSS	·	1.3 km	MPC · JPL
649211	2011 AZ_{90}	—	October 14, 2013	Mount Lemmon	Mount Lemmon Survey	·	570 m	MPC · JPL
649212	2011 AO_{93}	—	October 28, 2014	Haleakala	Pan-STARRS 1	·	1.5 km	MPC · JPL
649213	2011 AO_{94}	—	September 21, 2009	Kitt Peak	Spacewatch	·	1.2 km	MPC · JPL
649214	2011 AO_{95}	—	January 4, 2011	Mount Lemmon	Mount Lemmon Survey	·	1.5 km	MPC · JPL
649215	2011 AQ_{95}	—	January 3, 2011	Mount Lemmon	Mount Lemmon Survey	·	1.0 km	MPC · JPL
649216	2011 AR_{95}	—	January 10, 2011	Mount Lemmon	Mount Lemmon Survey	·	1.2 km	MPC · JPL
649217	2011 AV_{95}	—	January 14, 2011	Mount Lemmon	Mount Lemmon Survey	·	1.2 km	MPC · JPL
649218	2011 AT_{96}	—	January 4, 2011	Mount Lemmon	Mount Lemmon Survey	·	550 m	MPC · JPL
649219	2011 AZ_{103}	—	January 3, 2011	Mount Lemmon	Mount Lemmon Survey	·	1.2 km	MPC · JPL
649220	2011 AS_{107}	—	January 10, 2011	Mount Lemmon	Mount Lemmon Survey	·	470 m	MPC · JPL
649221	2011 BQ_{3}	—	February 28, 2008	Kitt Peak	Spacewatch	·	440 m	MPC · JPL
649222	2011 BH_{4}	—	January 16, 2011	Mount Lemmon	Mount Lemmon Survey	·	1.0 km	MPC · JPL
649223	2011 BL_{5}	—	January 16, 2011	Mount Lemmon	Mount Lemmon Survey	·	1.4 km	MPC · JPL
649224	2011 BF_{7}	—	September 16, 2006	Catalina	CSS	·	730 m	MPC · JPL
649225	2011 BQ_{9}	—	January 16, 2011	Mount Lemmon	Mount Lemmon Survey	·	1.1 km	MPC · JPL
649226	2011 BD_{12}	—	February 21, 2007	Mount Lemmon	Mount Lemmon Survey	·	1.3 km	MPC · JPL
649227	2011 BB_{13}	—	January 24, 2011	Alder Springs	Levin, K.	·	1.4 km	MPC · JPL
649228	2011 BZ_{13}	—	December 8, 2010	Mayhill-ISON	L. Elenin	·	1.6 km	MPC · JPL
649229	2011 BA_{24}	—	January 27, 2011	Kitt Peak	Spacewatch	·	1.2 km	MPC · JPL
649230	2011 BH_{28}	—	March 31, 2001	Kitt Peak	Spacewatch	·	3.2 km	MPC · JPL
649231	2011 BB_{34}	—	January 27, 2011	Kitt Peak	Spacewatch	·	1.1 km	MPC · JPL
649232	2011 BK_{46}	—	January 30, 2011	Piszkés-tető	K. Sárneczky, Z. Kuli	·	1.2 km	MPC · JPL
649233	2011 BO_{46}	—	January 30, 2011	Piszkés-tető	K. Sárneczky, Z. Kuli	·	1.2 km	MPC · JPL
649234	2011 BQ_{49}	—	September 25, 2003	Mauna Kea	P. A. Wiegert	·	2.2 km	MPC · JPL
649235	2011 BC_{50}	—	April 25, 2007	Kitt Peak	Spacewatch	TEL	1.6 km	MPC · JPL
649236	2011 BE_{50}	—	January 31, 2011	Piszkés-tető	K. Sárneczky, Z. Kuli	EOS	2.3 km	MPC · JPL
649237	2011 BF_{53}	—	January 11, 2011	Kitt Peak	Spacewatch	H	480 m	MPC · JPL
649238 Marsloire	2011 BK_{56}	Marsloire	November 6, 2005	Nogales	J.-C. Merlin	·	1.5 km	MPC · JPL
649239	2011 BO_{56}	—	January 25, 2011	Mount Lemmon	Mount Lemmon Survey	·	760 m	MPC · JPL
649240	2011 BT_{63}	—	January 28, 2011	Kitt Peak	Spacewatch	·	1.6 km	MPC · JPL
649241	2011 BO_{64}	—	January 29, 2011	Mayhill-ISON	L. Elenin	·	1.8 km	MPC · JPL
649242	2011 BQ_{66}	—	April 12, 2004	Kitt Peak	Spacewatch	·	1.1 km	MPC · JPL
649243	2011 BW_{66}	—	January 25, 2011	Kitt Peak	Spacewatch	VER	2.6 km	MPC · JPL
649244	2011 BB_{69}	—	January 29, 2011	Mount Lemmon	Mount Lemmon Survey	·	470 m	MPC · JPL
649245	2011 BM_{69}	—	January 29, 2011	Mount Lemmon	Mount Lemmon Survey	·	1.2 km	MPC · JPL
649246	2011 BS_{69}	—	January 27, 2011	Mount Lemmon	Mount Lemmon Survey	·	1.4 km	MPC · JPL
649247	2011 BM_{73}	—	February 10, 2011	Mount Lemmon	Mount Lemmon Survey	·	540 m	MPC · JPL
649248	2011 BA_{74}	—	August 27, 2005	Anderson Mesa	LONEOS	V	820 m	MPC · JPL
649249	2011 BU_{76}	—	February 5, 2011	Haleakala	Pan-STARRS 1	·	1.2 km	MPC · JPL
649250	2011 BZ_{77}	—	January 17, 2007	Kitt Peak	Spacewatch	EOS	2.3 km	MPC · JPL
649251	2011 BA_{81}	—	December 8, 2010	Mount Lemmon	Mount Lemmon Survey	·	1.2 km	MPC · JPL
649252	2011 BT_{82}	—	January 12, 2011	Mount Lemmon	Mount Lemmon Survey	H	480 m	MPC · JPL
649253	2011 BM_{88}	—	September 15, 2009	Bisei	BATTeRS	·	1.2 km	MPC · JPL
649254	2011 BD_{90}	—	December 9, 2010	Mount Lemmon	Mount Lemmon Survey	·	1.3 km	MPC · JPL
649255	2011 BA_{92}	—	March 29, 2008	Kitt Peak	Spacewatch	·	450 m	MPC · JPL
649256	2011 BL_{93}	—	November 4, 1996	Kitt Peak	Spacewatch	·	1.2 km	MPC · JPL
649257	2011 BH_{95}	—	October 28, 2005	Kitt Peak	Spacewatch	·	1.3 km	MPC · JPL
649258	2011 BQ_{97}	—	January 27, 2007	Mount Lemmon	Mount Lemmon Survey	·	1.2 km	MPC · JPL
649259	2011 BA_{99}	—	October 29, 2003	Kitt Peak	Spacewatch	·	630 m	MPC · JPL
649260	2011 BA_{107}	—	January 29, 2011	Kitt Peak	Spacewatch	·	590 m	MPC · JPL
649261	2011 BQ_{108}	—	September 19, 2006	Kitt Peak	Spacewatch	·	410 m	MPC · JPL
649262	2011 BW_{109}	—	February 5, 2011	Haleakala	Pan-STARRS 1	·	520 m	MPC · JPL
649263	2011 BO_{112}	—	February 5, 2011	Haleakala	Pan-STARRS 1	·	1.4 km	MPC · JPL
649264	2011 BL_{113}	—	March 2, 2011	Mount Lemmon	Mount Lemmon Survey	·	1.4 km	MPC · JPL
649265	2011 BC_{123}	—	February 8, 2011	Mount Lemmon	Mount Lemmon Survey	·	580 m	MPC · JPL
649266	2011 BP_{132}	—	October 28, 2005	Mount Lemmon	Mount Lemmon Survey	·	1.3 km	MPC · JPL
649267	2011 BN_{138}	—	January 29, 2011	Mount Lemmon	Mount Lemmon Survey	·	1.3 km	MPC · JPL
649268	2011 BQ_{145}	—	January 29, 2011	Mount Lemmon	Mount Lemmon Survey	·	1.4 km	MPC · JPL
649269	2011 BU_{146}	—	January 29, 2011	Mount Lemmon	Mount Lemmon Survey	·	550 m	MPC · JPL
649270	2011 BB_{147}	—	February 7, 2008	Kitt Peak	Spacewatch	·	640 m	MPC · JPL
649271	2011 BX_{150}	—	October 23, 2003	Kitt Peak	Deep Ecliptic Survey	·	2.2 km	MPC · JPL
649272	2011 BS_{156}	—	January 28, 2011	Mount Lemmon	Mount Lemmon Survey	GEF	1.1 km	MPC · JPL
649273	2011 BC_{159}	—	November 17, 2006	Mount Lemmon	Mount Lemmon Survey	·	530 m	MPC · JPL
649274	2011 BO_{159}	—	January 29, 2011	Mount Lemmon	Mount Lemmon Survey	·	1.5 km	MPC · JPL
649275	2011 BQ_{160}	—	October 28, 2005	Mount Lemmon	Mount Lemmon Survey	·	1.3 km	MPC · JPL
649276	2011 BS_{160}	—	January 29, 2011	Mount Lemmon	Mount Lemmon Survey	·	550 m	MPC · JPL
649277	2011 BO_{166}	—	January 28, 2011	Mount Lemmon	Mount Lemmon Survey	·	1.5 km	MPC · JPL
649278	2011 BO_{168}	—	January 30, 2011	Kitt Peak	Spacewatch	GEF	840 m	MPC · JPL
649279	2011 BT_{169}	—	September 30, 2006	Catalina	CSS	·	710 m	MPC · JPL
649280	2011 BB_{170}	—	January 30, 2011	Mount Lemmon	Mount Lemmon Survey	·	540 m	MPC · JPL
649281	2011 BD_{170}	—	January 30, 2011	Mount Lemmon	Mount Lemmon Survey	NEM	1.7 km	MPC · JPL
649282	2011 BA_{177}	—	March 3, 2016	Haleakala	Pan-STARRS 1	·	1.4 km	MPC · JPL
649283	2011 BG_{194}	—	January 25, 2011	Mount Lemmon	Mount Lemmon Survey	·	1.5 km	MPC · JPL
649284	2011 BM_{195}	—	January 30, 2011	Haleakala	Pan-STARRS 1	·	1.9 km	MPC · JPL
649285	2011 BZ_{195}	—	January 16, 2011	Mount Lemmon	Mount Lemmon Survey	·	1.4 km	MPC · JPL
649286	2011 BO_{196}	—	January 29, 2011	Mount Lemmon	Mount Lemmon Survey	EUN	1 km	MPC · JPL
649287	2011 BP_{198}	—	January 28, 2011	Mount Lemmon	Mount Lemmon Survey	·	2.3 km	MPC · JPL
649288	2011 BS_{200}	—	January 29, 2011	Mount Lemmon	Mount Lemmon Survey	·	530 m	MPC · JPL
649289	2011 BT_{201}	—	January 29, 2011	Mount Lemmon	Mount Lemmon Survey	EUN	950 m	MPC · JPL
649290	2011 BS_{206}	—	February 23, 2007	Mount Lemmon	Mount Lemmon Survey	·	1.4 km	MPC · JPL
649291	2011 CC_{4}	—	November 15, 2001	Ondřejov	P. Kušnirák	·	1.3 km	MPC · JPL
649292	2011 CR_{6}	—	December 8, 2001	Anderson Mesa	LONEOS	ADE	2.1 km	MPC · JPL
649293	2011 CS_{7}	—	October 2, 2006	Mount Lemmon	Mount Lemmon Survey	·	810 m	MPC · JPL
649294	2011 CW_{11}	—	February 5, 2011	Mount Lemmon	Mount Lemmon Survey	·	1.7 km	MPC · JPL
649295	2011 CX_{19}	—	February 5, 2011	Kitt Peak	Spacewatch	AGN	870 m	MPC · JPL
649296	2011 CK_{20}	—	April 3, 2008	Mount Lemmon	Mount Lemmon Survey	·	550 m	MPC · JPL
649297	2011 CT_{27}	—	March 1, 2008	Kitt Peak	Spacewatch	·	970 m	MPC · JPL
649298	2011 CT_{29}	—	January 30, 2011	Mount Lemmon	Mount Lemmon Survey	JUN	800 m	MPC · JPL
649299	2011 CW_{40}	—	April 7, 2002	Cerro Tololo	Deep Ecliptic Survey	·	1.3 km	MPC · JPL
649300	2011 CF_{48}	—	April 22, 2007	Catalina	CSS	DOR	2.1 km	MPC · JPL

== 649301–649400 ==
back to top

Designation			Discovery			Properties		Ref
Permanent	Provisional	Named after	Date	Site	Discoverer(s)	Category	Diam.	Ref
649301	2011 CP_{56}	—	August 16, 2009	Kitt Peak	Spacewatch	·	820 m	MPC · JPL
649302	2011 CY_{61}	—	February 8, 2011	Mount Lemmon	Mount Lemmon Survey	·	500 m	MPC · JPL
649303	2011 CO_{66}	—	February 7, 2003	Palomar	NEAT	·	1.5 km	MPC · JPL
649304	2011 CW_{66}	—	September 18, 2006	Kitt Peak	Spacewatch	·	530 m	MPC · JPL
649305	2011 CV_{67}	—	December 11, 2010	Mount Lemmon	Mount Lemmon Survey	·	1.4 km	MPC · JPL
649306	2011 CO_{73}	—	February 6, 2011	Catalina	CSS	·	1.8 km	MPC · JPL
649307	2011 CP_{73}	—	January 27, 2011	Kitt Peak	Spacewatch	EUN	1.4 km	MPC · JPL
649308	2011 CY_{81}	—	March 1, 2011	Catalina	CSS	·	1.6 km	MPC · JPL
649309	2011 CM_{84}	—	February 10, 2011	Mount Lemmon	Mount Lemmon Survey	·	1.2 km	MPC · JPL
649310	2011 CG_{86}	—	September 18, 2003	Kitt Peak	Spacewatch	·	2.8 km	MPC · JPL
649311	2011 CY_{87}	—	March 18, 2002	Kitt Peak	Spacewatch	·	1.4 km	MPC · JPL
649312	2011 CO_{94}	—	February 5, 2011	Haleakala	Pan-STARRS 1	·	1.4 km	MPC · JPL
649313	2011 CK_{96}	—	March 2, 2011	Mount Lemmon	Mount Lemmon Survey	·	1.4 km	MPC · JPL
649314	2011 CL_{99}	—	November 17, 2009	Kitt Peak	Spacewatch	DOR	1.8 km	MPC · JPL
649315	2011 CA_{107}	—	January 2, 2011	Mount Lemmon	Mount Lemmon Survey	·	1.9 km	MPC · JPL
649316	2011 CO_{107}	—	September 19, 2006	Kitt Peak	Spacewatch	·	420 m	MPC · JPL
649317	2011 CT_{109}	—	February 5, 2011	Haleakala	Pan-STARRS 1	·	470 m	MPC · JPL
649318	2011 CU_{110}	—	November 28, 2005	Mount Lemmon	Mount Lemmon Survey	·	1.4 km	MPC · JPL
649319	2011 CO_{113}	—	February 5, 2011	Haleakala	Pan-STARRS 1	·	1.3 km	MPC · JPL
649320	2011 CL_{114}	—	September 22, 2009	Mount Lemmon	Mount Lemmon Survey	·	700 m	MPC · JPL
649321	2011 CL_{119}	—	February 7, 2011	Mount Lemmon	Mount Lemmon Survey	·	450 m	MPC · JPL
649322	2011 CF_{123}	—	February 7, 2011	Mount Lemmon	Mount Lemmon Survey	·	550 m	MPC · JPL
649323	2011 CK_{124}	—	February 13, 2011	Mount Lemmon	Mount Lemmon Survey	·	600 m	MPC · JPL
649324	2011 CL_{128}	—	February 8, 2011	Mount Lemmon	Mount Lemmon Survey	·	1.3 km	MPC · JPL
649325	2011 CF_{130}	—	February 5, 2011	Haleakala	Pan-STARRS 1	·	1.3 km	MPC · JPL
649326	2011 CK_{130}	—	February 13, 2011	Mount Lemmon	Mount Lemmon Survey	·	930 m	MPC · JPL
649327	2011 CC_{131}	—	February 8, 2011	Mount Lemmon	Mount Lemmon Survey	·	1.1 km	MPC · JPL
649328	2011 CM_{131}	—	February 8, 2011	Mount Lemmon	Mount Lemmon Survey	·	830 m	MPC · JPL
649329	2011 CW_{133}	—	February 10, 2011	Mount Lemmon	Mount Lemmon Survey	HOF	1.9 km	MPC · JPL
649330	2011 CF_{138}	—	February 8, 2011	Mount Lemmon	Mount Lemmon Survey	·	1.5 km	MPC · JPL
649331	2011 CQ_{142}	—	February 7, 2011	Mount Lemmon	Mount Lemmon Survey	·	1.1 km	MPC · JPL
649332	2011 CX_{146}	—	October 23, 2009	Kitt Peak	Spacewatch	AGN	850 m	MPC · JPL
649333	2011 DZ_{3}	—	January 10, 2011	Mount Lemmon	Mount Lemmon Survey	·	2.4 km	MPC · JPL
649334	2011 DL_{7}	—	February 25, 2011	Mount Lemmon	Mount Lemmon Survey	·	1.1 km	MPC · JPL
649335	2011 DY_{12}	—	February 23, 2011	Catalina	CSS	·	1.0 km	MPC · JPL
649336	2011 DL_{13}	—	January 27, 2011	Mount Lemmon	Mount Lemmon Survey	·	710 m	MPC · JPL
649337	2011 DT_{14}	—	February 25, 2011	Mount Lemmon	Mount Lemmon Survey	·	1.3 km	MPC · JPL
649338	2011 DX_{21}	—	February 10, 2011	Catalina	CSS	H	470 m	MPC · JPL
649339	2011 DX_{28}	—	February 25, 2011	Mount Lemmon	Mount Lemmon Survey	·	1.6 km	MPC · JPL
649340	2011 DH_{30}	—	February 25, 2011	Mount Lemmon	Mount Lemmon Survey	·	1.2 km	MPC · JPL
649341	2011 DK_{30}	—	February 25, 2011	Mount Lemmon	Mount Lemmon Survey	·	580 m	MPC · JPL
649342	2011 DF_{32}	—	February 25, 2011	Mount Lemmon	Mount Lemmon Survey	(12739)	1.3 km	MPC · JPL
649343	2011 DC_{34}	—	February 25, 2011	Mount Lemmon	Mount Lemmon Survey	·	1.2 km	MPC · JPL
649344	2011 DM_{34}	—	December 29, 2005	Kitt Peak	Spacewatch	·	1.6 km	MPC · JPL
649345	2011 DE_{40}	—	February 25, 2011	Mount Lemmon	Mount Lemmon Survey	·	1.6 km	MPC · JPL
649346	2011 DN_{41}	—	October 10, 2001	Palomar	NEAT	·	1.4 km	MPC · JPL
649347	2011 DY_{44}	—	May 29, 2008	Mount Lemmon	Mount Lemmon Survey	·	610 m	MPC · JPL
649348	2011 DG_{46}	—	April 26, 2007	Mount Lemmon	Mount Lemmon Survey	·	1.8 km	MPC · JPL
649349	2011 DM_{46}	—	November 11, 2009	Kitt Peak	Spacewatch	·	1.7 km	MPC · JPL
649350	2011 DU_{51}	—	February 22, 2011	Kitt Peak	Spacewatch	·	1.5 km	MPC · JPL
649351	2011 DA_{52}	—	February 26, 2011	Mount Lemmon	Mount Lemmon Survey	·	1.3 km	MPC · JPL
649352	2011 DT_{56}	—	February 26, 2011	Mount Lemmon	Mount Lemmon Survey	·	1.1 km	MPC · JPL
649353	2011 DB_{57}	—	February 25, 2011	Mount Lemmon	Mount Lemmon Survey	·	1.1 km	MPC · JPL
649354	2011 DR_{58}	—	February 25, 2011	Mount Lemmon	Mount Lemmon Survey	KOR	1.2 km	MPC · JPL
649355	2011 EE_{2}	—	February 7, 2011	Mount Lemmon	Mount Lemmon Survey	H	370 m	MPC · JPL
649356	2011 EM_{2}	—	February 8, 2011	Mount Lemmon	Mount Lemmon Survey	·	1.4 km	MPC · JPL
649357	2011 ES_{3}	—	March 1, 2011	Mount Lemmon	Mount Lemmon Survey	·	460 m	MPC · JPL
649358	2011 EQ_{7}	—	March 12, 2007	Kitt Peak	Spacewatch	·	1.8 km	MPC · JPL
649359	2011 EH_{8}	—	April 25, 2007	Kitt Peak	Spacewatch	·	1.4 km	MPC · JPL
649360	2011 EE_{10}	—	March 3, 2011	Mount Lemmon	Mount Lemmon Survey	·	1.5 km	MPC · JPL
649361	2011 EY_{14}	—	February 29, 2004	Kitt Peak	Spacewatch	·	750 m	MPC · JPL
649362	2011 EC_{17}	—	March 6, 2011	Catalina	CSS	PHO	1.4 km	MPC · JPL
649363	2011 EY_{21}	—	February 8, 2011	Mount Lemmon	Mount Lemmon Survey	DOR	1.9 km	MPC · JPL
649364	2011 EK_{23}	—	May 20, 2006	Palomar	NEAT	TIR	3.2 km	MPC · JPL
649365	2011 EE_{24}	—	July 29, 2000	Cerro Tololo	Deep Ecliptic Survey	·	1.0 km	MPC · JPL
649366	2011 EB_{25}	—	February 25, 2011	Kitt Peak	Spacewatch	·	680 m	MPC · JPL
649367	2011 EP_{25}	—	March 5, 2011	Kitt Peak	Spacewatch	·	670 m	MPC · JPL
649368	2011 EL_{27}	—	March 6, 2011	Mount Lemmon	Mount Lemmon Survey	PHO	680 m	MPC · JPL
649369	2011 EL_{29}	—	April 4, 2008	Mount Lemmon	Mount Lemmon Survey	·	600 m	MPC · JPL
649370	2011 EF_{31}	—	April 11, 2002	Palomar	NEAT	·	2.3 km	MPC · JPL
649371	2011 ES_{34}	—	March 4, 2011	Kitt Peak	Spacewatch	·	950 m	MPC · JPL
649372	2011 EV_{35}	—	February 25, 2011	Mount Lemmon	Mount Lemmon Survey	·	1.2 km	MPC · JPL
649373	2011 EA_{43}	—	February 25, 2011	Mount Lemmon	Mount Lemmon Survey	·	510 m	MPC · JPL
649374	2011 EK_{45}	—	July 1, 2005	Kitt Peak	Spacewatch	·	610 m	MPC · JPL
649375	2011 EO_{49}	—	May 28, 2008	Mount Lemmon	Mount Lemmon Survey	·	550 m	MPC · JPL
649376	2011 ED_{51}	—	October 6, 2004	Palomar	NEAT	H	650 m	MPC · JPL
649377	2011 EO_{58}	—	March 12, 2011	Mount Lemmon	Mount Lemmon Survey	·	480 m	MPC · JPL
649378	2011 EB_{60}	—	March 12, 2011	Mount Lemmon	Mount Lemmon Survey	GEF	1.2 km	MPC · JPL
649379	2011 EN_{61}	—	March 12, 2011	Mount Lemmon	Mount Lemmon Survey	·	1.7 km	MPC · JPL
649380	2011 EY_{62}	—	September 28, 2008	Mount Lemmon	Mount Lemmon Survey	·	1.8 km	MPC · JPL
649381	2011 EN_{63}	—	March 8, 2011	Mount Lemmon	Mount Lemmon Survey	·	820 m	MPC · JPL
649382	2011 ET_{73}	—	May 4, 2002	Palomar	NEAT	DOR	3.2 km	MPC · JPL
649383	2011 EU_{83}	—	February 22, 2011	Kitt Peak	Spacewatch	H	550 m	MPC · JPL
649384	2011 ED_{84}	—	September 28, 2003	Kitt Peak	Spacewatch	EUP	3.4 km	MPC · JPL
649385	2011 EP_{86}	—	April 20, 2011	Haleakala	Pan-STARRS 1	H	690 m	MPC · JPL
649386	2011 EB_{88}	—	February 25, 2011	Mount Lemmon	Mount Lemmon Survey	·	1.4 km	MPC · JPL
649387	2011 EQ_{90}	—	October 2, 2006	Mount Lemmon	Mount Lemmon Survey	(883)	520 m	MPC · JPL
649388	2011 ET_{90}	—	March 10, 2011	Kitt Peak	Spacewatch	·	490 m	MPC · JPL
649389	2011 EJ_{93}	—	August 14, 2012	Haleakala	Pan-STARRS 1	JUN	910 m	MPC · JPL
649390	2011 EB_{97}	—	September 26, 2012	Mount Lemmon	Mount Lemmon Survey	·	720 m	MPC · JPL
649391	2011 EM_{100}	—	March 10, 2011	Kitt Peak	Spacewatch	·	1.4 km	MPC · JPL
649392	2011 EP_{100}	—	March 10, 2011	Kitt Peak	Spacewatch	·	1.8 km	MPC · JPL
649393	2011 EA_{101}	—	March 2, 2011	Mount Lemmon	Mount Lemmon Survey	·	1.4 km	MPC · JPL
649394	2011 EC_{101}	—	March 13, 2011	Kitt Peak	Spacewatch	·	1.4 km	MPC · JPL
649395	2011 EG_{102}	—	March 4, 2011	Mount Lemmon	Mount Lemmon Survey	·	1.3 km	MPC · JPL
649396	2011 EY_{102}	—	March 13, 2011	Kitt Peak	Spacewatch	·	1.5 km	MPC · JPL
649397	2011 EB_{106}	—	February 28, 2014	Haleakala	Pan-STARRS 1	L4	7.0 km	MPC · JPL
649398	2011 EG_{107}	—	March 10, 2011	Mount Lemmon	Mount Lemmon Survey	·	1.5 km	MPC · JPL
649399	2011 EP_{107}	—	February 13, 2011	Mount Lemmon	Mount Lemmon Survey	·	1.3 km	MPC · JPL
649400	2011 EK_{114}	—	March 4, 2011	Mount Lemmon	Mount Lemmon Survey	NEM	1.6 km	MPC · JPL

== 649401–649500 ==
back to top

Designation			Discovery			Properties		Ref
Permanent	Provisional	Named after	Date	Site	Discoverer(s)	Category	Diam.	Ref
649401	2011 FB	—	March 22, 2011	Marly	P. Kocher	·	1.5 km	MPC · JPL
649402	2011 FV_{10}	—	March 22, 2004	Socorro	LINEAR	·	760 m	MPC · JPL
649403	2011 FE_{14}	—	March 27, 2011	Mount Lemmon	Mount Lemmon Survey	·	540 m	MPC · JPL
649404	2011 FV_{14}	—	March 28, 2011	Mount Lemmon	Mount Lemmon Survey	·	1.9 km	MPC · JPL
649405	2011 FO_{17}	—	September 11, 2001	Anderson Mesa	LONEOS	H	730 m	MPC · JPL
649406	2011 FC_{26}	—	February 1, 2006	Kitt Peak	Spacewatch	DOR	2.3 km	MPC · JPL
649407	2011 FL_{26}	—	March 30, 2011	Piszkés-tető	K. Sárneczky, Z. Kuli	·	880 m	MPC · JPL
649408	2011 FQ_{27}	—	March 30, 2011	Piszkés-tető	K. Sárneczky, Z. Kuli	·	2.1 km	MPC · JPL
649409	2011 FK_{28}	—	February 2, 2005	Catalina	CSS	·	3.0 km	MPC · JPL
649410	2011 FX_{28}	—	March 5, 2002	Apache Point	SDSS Collaboration	·	1.1 km	MPC · JPL
649411	2011 FL_{34}	—	November 1, 2005	Kitt Peak	Spacewatch	·	930 m	MPC · JPL
649412	2011 FT_{38}	—	June 7, 2008	Kitt Peak	Spacewatch	·	710 m	MPC · JPL
649413	2011 FR_{41}	—	April 11, 2002	Palomar	NEAT	·	2.5 km	MPC · JPL
649414	2011 FO_{42}	—	March 27, 2011	Kitt Peak	Spacewatch	THM	1.8 km	MPC · JPL
649415	2011 FU_{44}	—	October 25, 2009	Kitt Peak	Spacewatch	·	560 m	MPC · JPL
649416	2011 FE_{46}	—	April 15, 2004	Palomar	NEAT	·	760 m	MPC · JPL
649417	2011 FA_{47}	—	February 17, 2007	Kitt Peak	Spacewatch	NYS	740 m	MPC · JPL
649418	2011 FM_{50}	—	March 30, 2011	Mount Lemmon	Mount Lemmon Survey	AGN	980 m	MPC · JPL
649419	2011 FO_{57}	—	September 17, 2009	Mount Lemmon	Mount Lemmon Survey	·	540 m	MPC · JPL
649420	2011 FL_{63}	—	March 11, 2011	Kitt Peak	Spacewatch	H	400 m	MPC · JPL
649421	2011 FO_{63}	—	February 25, 2011	Kitt Peak	Spacewatch	·	560 m	MPC · JPL
649422	2011 FQ_{65}	—	November 24, 2009	Kitt Peak	Spacewatch	·	1.3 km	MPC · JPL
649423	2011 FL_{66}	—	December 29, 2005	Socorro	LINEAR	·	1.4 km	MPC · JPL
649424	2011 FQ_{66}	—	September 7, 2008	Mount Lemmon	Mount Lemmon Survey	HOF	2.3 km	MPC · JPL
649425	2011 FV_{66}	—	March 26, 2011	Siding Spring	SSS	THB	2.6 km	MPC · JPL
649426	2011 FM_{67}	—	March 27, 2011	Mount Lemmon	Mount Lemmon Survey	·	1.4 km	MPC · JPL
649427	2011 FV_{72}	—	December 11, 2009	Mount Lemmon	Mount Lemmon Survey	·	1.5 km	MPC · JPL
649428	2011 FE_{76}	—	August 20, 2009	Kitt Peak	Spacewatch	·	600 m	MPC · JPL
649429	2011 FM_{78}	—	February 13, 2004	Kitt Peak	Spacewatch	·	790 m	MPC · JPL
649430	2011 FS_{84}	—	March 11, 2011	Catalina	CSS	·	1.4 km	MPC · JPL
649431	2011 FG_{85}	—	March 26, 2011	Mount Lemmon	Mount Lemmon Survey	V	560 m	MPC · JPL
649432	2011 FM_{85}	—	March 27, 2011	Mount Lemmon	Mount Lemmon Survey	·	1.9 km	MPC · JPL
649433	2011 FJ_{86}	—	April 2, 2011	Haleakala	Pan-STARRS 1	H	370 m	MPC · JPL
649434	2011 FG_{89}	—	February 5, 2011	Mount Lemmon	Mount Lemmon Survey	·	1.3 km	MPC · JPL
649435	2011 FO_{91}	—	November 10, 2009	Mount Lemmon	Mount Lemmon Survey	·	1.2 km	MPC · JPL
649436	2011 FP_{96}	—	October 2, 2008	Kitt Peak	Spacewatch	AGN	1.2 km	MPC · JPL
649437	2011 FQ_{96}	—	November 24, 2009	Kitt Peak	Spacewatch	·	1.3 km	MPC · JPL
649438	2011 FX_{98}	—	September 6, 2008	Kitt Peak	Spacewatch	AGN	940 m	MPC · JPL
649439	2011 FK_{102}	—	June 30, 2005	Kitt Peak	Spacewatch	·	730 m	MPC · JPL
649440	2011 FO_{102}	—	August 26, 2002	Palomar	NEAT	·	2.7 km	MPC · JPL
649441	2011 FZ_{103}	—	April 2, 2011	Haleakala	Pan-STARRS 1	·	1.6 km	MPC · JPL
649442	2011 FU_{105}	—	July 28, 2008	Siding Spring	SSS	·	1.6 km	MPC · JPL
649443	2011 FH_{118}	—	April 2, 2011	Mount Lemmon	Mount Lemmon Survey	·	2.0 km	MPC · JPL
649444	2011 FK_{119}	—	April 1, 2011	Mount Lemmon	Mount Lemmon Survey	·	630 m	MPC · JPL
649445	2011 FJ_{123}	—	October 24, 2005	Mauna Kea	A. Boattini	HOF	2.4 km	MPC · JPL
649446	2011 FM_{125}	—	April 1, 2011	Kitt Peak	Spacewatch	·	1.6 km	MPC · JPL
649447	2011 FF_{132}	—	February 8, 2011	Mount Lemmon	Mount Lemmon Survey	·	1.3 km	MPC · JPL
649448	2011 FK_{135}	—	November 27, 2009	Mount Lemmon	Mount Lemmon Survey	·	1.8 km	MPC · JPL
649449	2011 FO_{136}	—	April 7, 2002	Cerro Tololo	Deep Ecliptic Survey	·	1.6 km	MPC · JPL
649450	2011 FL_{138}	—	September 29, 2009	Mount Lemmon	Mount Lemmon Survey	GEF	960 m	MPC · JPL
649451	2011 FL_{145}	—	March 31, 2011	Haleakala	Pan-STARRS 1	·	600 m	MPC · JPL
649452	2011 FW_{150}	—	December 19, 2004	Mount Lemmon	Mount Lemmon Survey	TIR	2.9 km	MPC · JPL
649453	2011 FC_{151}	—	March 26, 2011	Siding Spring	SSS	·	2.2 km	MPC · JPL
649454	2011 FT_{152}	—	March 31, 2011	Mount Lemmon	Mount Lemmon Survey	H	480 m	MPC · JPL
649455	2011 FT_{153}	—	March 26, 2011	Mount Lemmon	Mount Lemmon Survey	·	1.8 km	MPC · JPL
649456	2011 FE_{157}	—	April 29, 2003	Kitt Peak	Spacewatch	·	1.3 km	MPC · JPL
649457	2011 FC_{163}	—	March 27, 2011	Kitt Peak	Spacewatch	·	520 m	MPC · JPL
649458	2011 FU_{163}	—	October 21, 2012	Mount Lemmon	Mount Lemmon Survey	·	810 m	MPC · JPL
649459	2011 FW_{169}	—	May 28, 2008	Mount Lemmon	Mount Lemmon Survey	·	640 m	MPC · JPL
649460	2011 GT_{4}	—	September 29, 2005	Kitt Peak	Spacewatch	·	710 m	MPC · JPL
649461	2011 GG_{5}	—	April 2, 2011	Mount Lemmon	Mount Lemmon Survey	·	2.1 km	MPC · JPL
649462	2011 GO_{5}	—	January 4, 2006	Kitt Peak	Spacewatch	·	1.6 km	MPC · JPL
649463	2011 GV_{11}	—	April 1, 2011	Mount Lemmon	Mount Lemmon Survey	·	1.5 km	MPC · JPL
649464	2011 GJ_{18}	—	April 2, 2011	Mount Lemmon	Mount Lemmon Survey	·	1.4 km	MPC · JPL
649465	2011 GB_{21}	—	February 1, 2006	Mount Lemmon	Mount Lemmon Survey	·	2.3 km	MPC · JPL
649466	2011 GU_{23}	—	September 5, 2008	Kitt Peak	Spacewatch	·	2.1 km	MPC · JPL
649467	2011 GJ_{24}	—	September 3, 2008	Kitt Peak	Spacewatch	·	1.7 km	MPC · JPL
649468	2011 GM_{26}	—	December 24, 2006	Kitt Peak	Spacewatch	·	580 m	MPC · JPL
649469	2011 GT_{26}	—	April 24, 2004	Kitt Peak	Spacewatch	·	730 m	MPC · JPL
649470	2011 GQ_{32}	—	September 29, 2008	Kitt Peak	Spacewatch	·	2.0 km	MPC · JPL
649471	2011 GV_{34}	—	April 3, 2011	Haleakala	Pan-STARRS 1	·	1.2 km	MPC · JPL
649472	2011 GB_{35}	—	February 17, 2007	Kitt Peak	Spacewatch	·	1.1 km	MPC · JPL
649473	2011 GL_{38}	—	September 4, 2008	Kitt Peak	Spacewatch	·	1.4 km	MPC · JPL
649474	2011 GZ_{39}	—	April 6, 2008	Mount Lemmon	Mount Lemmon Survey	V	510 m	MPC · JPL
649475	2011 GO_{41}	—	April 5, 2011	Catalina	CSS	·	2.6 km	MPC · JPL
649476	2011 GY_{41}	—	December 30, 2000	Kitt Peak	Spacewatch	·	2.3 km	MPC · JPL
649477	2011 GR_{44}	—	March 10, 2011	Kitt Peak	Spacewatch	·	850 m	MPC · JPL
649478	2011 GC_{45}	—	January 10, 2007	Mount Lemmon	Mount Lemmon Survey	NYS	1.0 km	MPC · JPL
649479	2011 GM_{50}	—	April 5, 2011	Kitt Peak	Spacewatch	DOR	2.0 km	MPC · JPL
649480	2011 GD_{53}	—	September 5, 2008	Kitt Peak	Spacewatch	THM	2.0 km	MPC · JPL
649481	2011 GY_{60}	—	February 23, 2011	Kitt Peak	Spacewatch	·	1.2 km	MPC · JPL
649482	2011 GM_{65}	—	April 13, 2011	Haleakala	Pan-STARRS 1	H	420 m	MPC · JPL
649483	2011 GB_{73}	—	March 1, 2011	Mount Lemmon	Mount Lemmon Survey	·	520 m	MPC · JPL
649484	2011 GD_{74}	—	April 2, 2011	Kitt Peak	Spacewatch	·	540 m	MPC · JPL
649485	2011 GS_{79}	—	August 22, 2001	Kitt Peak	Spacewatch	·	750 m	MPC · JPL
649486	2011 GA_{84}	—	March 17, 2002	Kitt Peak	Spacewatch	·	1.2 km	MPC · JPL
649487	2011 GO_{90}	—	October 2, 2008	Mount Lemmon	Mount Lemmon Survey	·	1.3 km	MPC · JPL
649488	2011 GL_{92}	—	September 13, 2013	Mount Lemmon	Mount Lemmon Survey	·	1.6 km	MPC · JPL
649489	2011 GM_{96}	—	April 2, 2011	Kitt Peak	Spacewatch	·	2.4 km	MPC · JPL
649490	2011 GA_{100}	—	April 7, 2011	Kitt Peak	Spacewatch	·	2.1 km	MPC · JPL
649491	2011 GJ_{100}	—	April 13, 2011	Haleakala	Pan-STARRS 1	·	710 m	MPC · JPL
649492	2011 GN_{100}	—	April 12, 2011	Mount Lemmon	Mount Lemmon Survey	·	1.6 km	MPC · JPL
649493	2011 GR_{100}	—	April 3, 2011	Haleakala	Pan-STARRS 1	·	1.6 km	MPC · JPL
649494	2011 GX_{100}	—	April 3, 2011	Haleakala	Pan-STARRS 1	·	1.7 km	MPC · JPL
649495	2011 GT_{103}	—	April 6, 2011	Mount Lemmon	Mount Lemmon Survey	·	690 m	MPC · JPL
649496	2011 GU_{103}	—	April 2, 2011	Haleakala	Pan-STARRS 1	·	660 m	MPC · JPL
649497	2011 GO_{104}	—	April 13, 2011	Mount Lemmon	Mount Lemmon Survey	·	1.7 km	MPC · JPL
649498	2011 GR_{104}	—	April 3, 2011	Haleakala	Pan-STARRS 1	·	1.6 km	MPC · JPL
649499	2011 GS_{104}	—	April 5, 2011	Mount Lemmon	Mount Lemmon Survey	PAD	1.3 km	MPC · JPL
649500	2011 HD_{2}	—	April 24, 2011	Haleakala	Pan-STARRS 1	H	490 m	MPC · JPL

== 649501–649600 ==
back to top

Designation			Discovery			Properties		Ref
Permanent	Provisional	Named after	Date	Site	Discoverer(s)	Category	Diam.	Ref
649501	2011 HY_{2}	—	April 11, 2011	Mount Lemmon	Mount Lemmon Survey	EOS	1.6 km	MPC · JPL
649502	2011 HZ_{3}	—	April 13, 2011	Mount Lemmon	Mount Lemmon Survey	·	1.8 km	MPC · JPL
649503	2011 HF_{4}	—	April 26, 2011	Mount Lemmon	Mount Lemmon Survey	H	380 m	MPC · JPL
649504	2011 HS_{6}	—	April 12, 2008	Mount Lemmon	Mount Lemmon Survey	H	420 m	MPC · JPL
649505	2011 HT_{12}	—	May 5, 2002	Palomar	NEAT	·	2.3 km	MPC · JPL
649506	2011 HX_{19}	—	September 6, 2008	Kitt Peak	Spacewatch	NYS	790 m	MPC · JPL
649507	2011 HD_{26}	—	February 21, 2007	Mount Lemmon	Mount Lemmon Survey	NYS	930 m	MPC · JPL
649508	2011 HK_{29}	—	March 20, 2003	Palomar	NEAT	·	1.7 km	MPC · JPL
649509	2011 HA_{30}	—	April 30, 2004	Kitt Peak	Spacewatch	·	730 m	MPC · JPL
649510	2011 HQ_{36}	—	April 27, 2011	Kitt Peak	Spacewatch	·	1.3 km	MPC · JPL
649511	2011 HP_{37}	—	April 27, 2011	Haleakala	Pan-STARRS 1	·	640 m	MPC · JPL
649512	2011 HC_{43}	—	March 31, 2011	Mount Lemmon	Mount Lemmon Survey	·	620 m	MPC · JPL
649513	2011 HM_{45}	—	December 13, 2006	Mauna Kea	D. D. Balam, K. M. Perrett	·	890 m	MPC · JPL
649514	2011 HH_{46}	—	October 24, 2005	Mauna Kea	A. Boattini	·	1.7 km	MPC · JPL
649515	2011 HC_{53}	—	April 28, 2011	Haleakala	Pan-STARRS 1	H	460 m	MPC · JPL
649516	2011 HR_{68}	—	March 1, 2011	Kitt Peak	Spacewatch	·	1.4 km	MPC · JPL
649517	2011 HV_{68}	—	April 7, 2011	Kitt Peak	Spacewatch	·	930 m	MPC · JPL
649518	2011 HJ_{72}	—	April 26, 2011	Mount Lemmon	Mount Lemmon Survey	·	1.8 km	MPC · JPL
649519	2011 HS_{73}	—	April 27, 2011	Mount Lemmon	Mount Lemmon Survey	V	540 m	MPC · JPL
649520	2011 HD_{75}	—	April 27, 2011	Mount Lemmon	Mount Lemmon Survey	·	660 m	MPC · JPL
649521	2011 HW_{79}	—	February 13, 2011	Mount Lemmon	Mount Lemmon Survey	·	1.9 km	MPC · JPL
649522	2011 HF_{90}	—	April 13, 2011	Mount Lemmon	Mount Lemmon Survey	·	710 m	MPC · JPL
649523	2011 HX_{90}	—	July 30, 2008	Mount Lemmon	Mount Lemmon Survey	MAS	600 m	MPC · JPL
649524	2011 HY_{92}	—	January 31, 2006	Kitt Peak	Spacewatch	·	1.4 km	MPC · JPL
649525	2011 HQ_{98}	—	March 28, 2011	Kitt Peak	Spacewatch	·	1.7 km	MPC · JPL
649526	2011 HU_{101}	—	February 22, 2011	Kitt Peak	Spacewatch	·	1.4 km	MPC · JPL
649527	2011 JQ	—	January 30, 2011	Kitt Peak	Spacewatch	·	1.6 km	MPC · JPL
649528	2011 JE_{5}	—	May 1, 2011	Haleakala	Pan-STARRS 1	(883)	610 m	MPC · JPL
649529	2011 JZ_{5}	—	May 1, 2011	Haleakala	Pan-STARRS 1	·	1.7 km	MPC · JPL
649530	2011 JQ_{6}	—	April 23, 2011	Haleakala	Pan-STARRS 1	MAS	570 m	MPC · JPL
649531	2011 JT_{16}	—	February 26, 2004	Socorro	LINEAR	·	620 m	MPC · JPL
649532	2011 JV_{16}	—	June 14, 2004	Kitt Peak	Spacewatch	·	870 m	MPC · JPL
649533	2011 JE_{19}	—	May 1, 2011	Haleakala	Pan-STARRS 1	BRA	1.5 km	MPC · JPL
649534	2011 JS_{19}	—	September 13, 2007	Mount Lemmon	Mount Lemmon Survey	·	1.8 km	MPC · JPL
649535	2011 JT_{19}	—	December 13, 2004	Kitt Peak	Spacewatch	·	2.1 km	MPC · JPL
649536	2011 JZ_{20}	—	January 10, 2007	Kitt Peak	Spacewatch	·	630 m	MPC · JPL
649537	2011 JB_{27}	—	February 13, 2011	Mount Lemmon	Mount Lemmon Survey	·	1.7 km	MPC · JPL
649538	2011 JE_{38}	—	May 10, 2011	Kitt Peak	Spacewatch	·	620 m	MPC · JPL
649539	2011 KM_{1}	—	May 8, 2011	Kitt Peak	Spacewatch	·	1.2 km	MPC · JPL
649540	2011 KK_{4}	—	May 22, 2011	Nogales	M. Schwartz, P. R. Holvorcem	H	660 m	MPC · JPL
649541	2011 KY_{7}	—	April 28, 2011	Haleakala	Pan-STARRS 1	·	690 m	MPC · JPL
649542	2011 KJ_{19}	—	May 28, 2011	Nogales	M. Schwartz, P. R. Holvorcem	H	570 m	MPC · JPL
649543	2011 KZ_{20}	—	October 21, 2007	Kitt Peak	Spacewatch	·	2.2 km	MPC · JPL
649544	2011 KP_{32}	—	October 19, 2003	Apache Point	SDSS Collaboration	·	1.5 km	MPC · JPL
649545	2011 KU_{33}	—	April 26, 1993	Kitt Peak	Spacewatch	·	1.8 km	MPC · JPL
649546	2011 KW_{40}	—	May 24, 2011	Haleakala	Pan-STARRS 1	·	840 m	MPC · JPL
649547	2011 KP_{42}	—	April 7, 2000	Kitt Peak	Spacewatch	·	890 m	MPC · JPL
649548	2011 KP_{43}	—	May 26, 2011	Mount Lemmon	Mount Lemmon Survey	·	560 m	MPC · JPL
649549	2011 KD_{46}	—	February 19, 2003	Palomar	NEAT	·	1.1 km	MPC · JPL
649550	2011 KR_{55}	—	May 21, 2011	Mount Lemmon	Mount Lemmon Survey	·	1.3 km	MPC · JPL
649551	2011 KA_{56}	—	May 24, 2011	Mount Lemmon	Mount Lemmon Survey	·	1.4 km	MPC · JPL
649552	2011 KP_{57}	—	May 31, 2011	Kitt Peak	Spacewatch	H	410 m	MPC · JPL
649553	2011 KS_{57}	—	May 22, 2011	Mount Lemmon	Mount Lemmon Survey	·	1.5 km	MPC · JPL
649554	2011 KW_{57}	—	May 22, 2011	Mount Lemmon	Mount Lemmon Survey	·	1.9 km	MPC · JPL
649555	2011 KZ_{58}	—	May 24, 2011	Haleakala	Pan-STARRS 1	·	2.4 km	MPC · JPL
649556	2011 LJ_{3}	—	June 4, 2011	Mount Lemmon	Mount Lemmon Survey	DOR	1.7 km	MPC · JPL
649557	2011 LL_{3}	—	June 4, 2011	Mount Lemmon	Mount Lemmon Survey	·	1.5 km	MPC · JPL
649558	2011 LK_{4}	—	June 5, 2011	Mount Lemmon	Mount Lemmon Survey	·	1.8 km	MPC · JPL
649559	2011 LP_{4}	—	April 9, 2002	Anderson Mesa	LONEOS	JUN	1.2 km	MPC · JPL
649560	2011 LA_{6}	—	March 26, 2007	Mount Lemmon	Mount Lemmon Survey	·	860 m	MPC · JPL
649561	2011 LM_{9}	—	June 6, 2011	Mount Lemmon	Mount Lemmon Survey	·	1.6 km	MPC · JPL
649562	2011 LN_{12}	—	March 25, 2000	Kitt Peak	Spacewatch	·	1.2 km	MPC · JPL
649563	2011 LQ_{18}	—	June 6, 2011	Mount Lemmon	Mount Lemmon Survey	·	2.1 km	MPC · JPL
649564	2011 LR_{19}	—	May 30, 2011	Kitt Peak	Spacewatch	TIR	2.6 km	MPC · JPL
649565	2011 LX_{22}	—	June 4, 2011	Mount Lemmon	Mount Lemmon Survey	AGN	1.1 km	MPC · JPL
649566	2011 LZ_{24}	—	June 6, 2011	Haleakala	Pan-STARRS 1	·	750 m	MPC · JPL
649567	2011 LN_{27}	—	June 3, 2011	Mount Lemmon	Mount Lemmon Survey	·	2.3 km	MPC · JPL
649568	2011 LT_{27}	—	May 28, 2011	ESA OGS	ESA OGS	PHO	660 m	MPC · JPL
649569	2011 LT_{34}	—	June 11, 2011	Haleakala	Pan-STARRS 1	L5	7.2 km	MPC · JPL
649570	2011 LC_{36}	—	June 5, 2011	Kitt Peak	Spacewatch	NAE	1.7 km	MPC · JPL
649571	2011 MZ_{9}	—	September 15, 2003	Palomar	NEAT	EUN	1.5 km	MPC · JPL
649572	2011 MV_{10}	—	October 19, 2006	Catalina	CSS	LIX	3.1 km	MPC · JPL
649573	2011 MP_{11}	—	June 27, 2011	Mount Lemmon	Mount Lemmon Survey	·	750 m	MPC · JPL
649574	2011 MS_{12}	—	June 27, 2011	Kitt Peak	Spacewatch	·	2.2 km	MPC · JPL
649575	2011 MR_{13}	—	June 26, 2015	Haleakala	Pan-STARRS 1	·	740 m	MPC · JPL
649576	2011 MQ_{15}	—	February 20, 2014	Mount Lemmon	Mount Lemmon Survey	·	2.9 km	MPC · JPL
649577	2011 MA_{16}	—	June 24, 2011	Kitt Peak	Spacewatch	·	860 m	MPC · JPL
649578	2011 NW_{2}	—	September 19, 2003	Palomar	NEAT	·	2.7 km	MPC · JPL
649579	2011 NP_{4}	—	October 1, 2017	Mount Lemmon	Mount Lemmon Survey	H	410 m	MPC · JPL
649580	2011 NU_{4}	—	December 8, 2012	Mount Lemmon	Mount Lemmon Survey	·	1.9 km	MPC · JPL
649581	2011 OY	—	November 18, 2008	Kitt Peak	Spacewatch	·	2.5 km	MPC · JPL
649582	2011 OM_{2}	—	July 23, 2011	Haleakala	Pan-STARRS 1	EOS	1.6 km	MPC · JPL
649583	2011 OV_{5}	—	July 24, 2011	Haleakala	Pan-STARRS 1	EOS	1.4 km	MPC · JPL
649584	2011 OE_{9}	—	July 27, 2011	Haleakala	Pan-STARRS 1	VER	1.9 km	MPC · JPL
649585	2011 OJ_{11}	—	July 25, 2011	Haleakala	Pan-STARRS 1	·	1.8 km	MPC · JPL
649586	2011 OF_{13}	—	October 1, 2006	Kitt Peak	Spacewatch	·	2.0 km	MPC · JPL
649587	2011 OX_{13}	—	July 25, 2011	Haleakala	Pan-STARRS 1	·	890 m	MPC · JPL
649588	2011 OY_{13}	—	July 25, 2011	Haleakala	Pan-STARRS 1	·	950 m	MPC · JPL
649589	2011 OD_{20}	—	July 22, 2011	Haleakala	Pan-STARRS 1	MAS	570 m	MPC · JPL
649590	2011 OU_{20}	—	August 7, 2000	Haleakala	NEAT	·	1.3 km	MPC · JPL
649591	2011 OW_{20}	—	July 23, 2011	Haleakala	Pan-STARRS 1	EOS	1.5 km	MPC · JPL
649592	2011 OS_{21}	—	July 25, 2011	Haleakala	Pan-STARRS 1	·	1.8 km	MPC · JPL
649593	2011 OF_{27}	—	July 8, 2003	Palomar	NEAT	MAR	1.3 km	MPC · JPL
649594	2011 OS_{32}	—	October 10, 2008	Mount Lemmon	Mount Lemmon Survey	·	940 m	MPC · JPL
649595	2011 OK_{36}	—	August 1, 2011	Haleakala	Pan-STARRS 1	·	990 m	MPC · JPL
649596	2011 OL_{36}	—	July 27, 2011	Siding Spring	SSS	·	680 m	MPC · JPL
649597	2011 OJ_{42}	—	June 27, 2011	Mount Lemmon	Mount Lemmon Survey	THB	2.2 km	MPC · JPL
649598	2011 OK_{46}	—	June 22, 2011	Mount Lemmon	Mount Lemmon Survey	·	1.1 km	MPC · JPL
649599	2011 OX_{48}	—	July 3, 2011	Mount Lemmon	Mount Lemmon Survey	LIX	3.1 km	MPC · JPL
649600	2011 OV_{51}	—	February 12, 2000	Apache Point	SDSS	·	860 m	MPC · JPL

== 649601–649700 ==
back to top

Designation			Discovery			Properties		Ref
Permanent	Provisional	Named after	Date	Site	Discoverer(s)	Category	Diam.	Ref
649601	2011 OW_{51}	—	August 12, 2007	XuYi	PMO NEO Survey Program	·	1.4 km	MPC · JPL
649602	2011 OC_{59}	—	August 1, 2011	Haleakala	Pan-STARRS 1	·	760 m	MPC · JPL
649603	2011 OO_{62}	—	May 21, 2015	Haleakala	Pan-STARRS 1	·	1.7 km	MPC · JPL
649604	2011 OK_{70}	—	July 24, 2011	Haleakala	Pan-STARRS 1	·	2.1 km	MPC · JPL
649605	2011 OF_{71}	—	October 21, 1995	Kitt Peak	Spacewatch	·	1.9 km	MPC · JPL
649606	2011 OX_{72}	—	July 27, 2011	Haleakala	Pan-STARRS 1	EOS	1.3 km	MPC · JPL
649607	2011 OB_{74}	—	July 28, 2011	Haleakala	Pan-STARRS 1	·	2.4 km	MPC · JPL
649608	2011 OD_{76}	—	July 28, 2011	Haleakala	Pan-STARRS 1	·	2.4 km	MPC · JPL
649609	2011 PN_{3}	—	October 4, 2006	Mount Lemmon	Mount Lemmon Survey	·	2.0 km	MPC · JPL
649610	2011 PA_{10}	—	December 4, 2008	Mount Lemmon	Mount Lemmon Survey	NYS	1 km	MPC · JPL
649611	2011 PA_{12}	—	May 28, 2011	Mount Lemmon	Mount Lemmon Survey	NYS	1.0 km	MPC · JPL
649612	2011 PF_{15}	—	August 6, 2011	Palomar	Palomar Transient Factory	·	1.7 km	MPC · JPL
649613	2011 PB_{16}	—	March 21, 2009	Kitt Peak	Spacewatch	3:2	4.7 km	MPC · JPL
649614	2011 PD_{16}	—	December 5, 2008	Mount Lemmon	Mount Lemmon Survey	·	1.1 km	MPC · JPL
649615	2011 PZ_{17}	—	August 25, 1995	Kitt Peak	Spacewatch	·	2.4 km	MPC · JPL
649616	2011 PE_{18}	—	August 2, 2011	Haleakala	Pan-STARRS 1	·	2.4 km	MPC · JPL
649617	2011 PM_{21}	—	August 6, 2011	Haleakala	Pan-STARRS 1	·	2.2 km	MPC · JPL
649618	2011 PT_{22}	—	July 30, 2011	La Sagra	OAM	T_{j} (2.89)	2.4 km	MPC · JPL
649619	2011 PW_{23}	—	August 2, 2011	Haleakala	Pan-STARRS 1	·	2.3 km	MPC · JPL
649620	2011 QO_{1}	—	August 19, 2011	Haleakala	Pan-STARRS 1	·	2.3 km	MPC · JPL
649621	2011 QN_{2}	—	August 20, 2011	Haleakala	Pan-STARRS 1	·	2.2 km	MPC · JPL
649622	2011 QK_{5}	—	April 27, 2006	Cerro Tololo	Deep Ecliptic Survey	·	1.1 km	MPC · JPL
649623	2011 QL_{5}	—	October 8, 2007	Catalina	CSS	·	1.8 km	MPC · JPL
649624	2011 QU_{5}	—	August 2, 2011	Haleakala	Pan-STARRS 1	·	2.7 km	MPC · JPL
649625	2011 QP_{8}	—	January 11, 2008	Kitt Peak	Spacewatch	·	2.8 km	MPC · JPL
649626	2011 QC_{11}	—	October 21, 2006	Lulin	LUSS	·	2.3 km	MPC · JPL
649627	2011 QL_{11}	—	August 21, 2011	Haleakala	Pan-STARRS 1	·	2.8 km	MPC · JPL
649628	2011 QG_{14}	—	August 20, 2011	La Sagra	OAM	·	3.0 km	MPC · JPL
649629	2011 QN_{14}	—	August 22, 2011	La Sagra	OAM	MAS	700 m	MPC · JPL
649630	2011 QK_{15}	—	August 23, 2011	Haleakala	Pan-STARRS 1	·	1.1 km	MPC · JPL
649631	2011 QQ_{15}	—	November 12, 2001	Apache Point	SDSS Collaboration	·	1.9 km	MPC · JPL
649632	2011 QJ_{20}	—	August 23, 2011	Haleakala	Pan-STARRS 1	·	1.4 km	MPC · JPL
649633	2011 QZ_{23}	—	August 20, 2011	Haleakala	Pan-STARRS 1	·	2.6 km	MPC · JPL
649634	2011 QU_{26}	—	June 24, 2011	Kitt Peak	Spacewatch	·	2.3 km	MPC · JPL
649635	2011 QQ_{28}	—	September 25, 2006	Kitt Peak	Spacewatch	·	1.7 km	MPC · JPL
649636	2011 QS_{30}	—	August 4, 2011	Siding Spring	SSS	·	1.2 km	MPC · JPL
649637	2011 QY_{30}	—	January 13, 2008	Kitt Peak	Spacewatch	·	2.6 km	MPC · JPL
649638	2011 QB_{32}	—	August 25, 2011	La Sagra	OAM	·	970 m	MPC · JPL
649639	2011 QS_{32}	—	August 23, 2011	Haleakala	Pan-STARRS 1	NYS	910 m	MPC · JPL
649640	2011 QZ_{34}	—	July 31, 2011	Mayhill-ISON	L. Elenin	NYS	1.2 km	MPC · JPL
649641	2011 QZ_{37}	—	January 12, 2002	Palomar	NEAT	·	3.4 km	MPC · JPL
649642	2011 QQ_{38}	—	August 25, 2011	Sandlot	G. Hug	·	3.0 km	MPC · JPL
649643	2011 QL_{41}	—	August 24, 2011	Haleakala	Pan-STARRS 1	EUP	3.2 km	MPC · JPL
649644	2011 QU_{41}	—	August 28, 2011	Ka-Dar	Gerke, V.	H	420 m	MPC · JPL
649645	2011 QV_{41}	—	February 16, 2010	Mount Lemmon	Mount Lemmon Survey	·	1.3 km	MPC · JPL
649646	2011 QM_{43}	—	December 19, 2007	Mount Lemmon	Mount Lemmon Survey	·	3.6 km	MPC · JPL
649647	2011 QF_{47}	—	February 3, 2009	Mount Lemmon	Mount Lemmon Survey	EOS	2.0 km	MPC · JPL
649648	2011 QM_{51}	—	September 25, 2003	Palomar	NEAT	·	1.3 km	MPC · JPL
649649	2011 QA_{53}	—	August 30, 2011	Haleakala	Pan-STARRS 1	·	2.4 km	MPC · JPL
649650	2011 QH_{53}	—	August 28, 2011	Haleakala	Pan-STARRS 1	·	2.3 km	MPC · JPL
649651	2011 QR_{55}	—	August 24, 2011	Haleakala	Pan-STARRS 1	EOS	1.4 km	MPC · JPL
649652	2011 QW_{55}	—	July 24, 2007	Charleston	R. Holmes	NYS	1.1 km	MPC · JPL
649653	2011 QG_{57}	—	August 29, 2011	Mayhill-ISON	L. Elenin	TIR	2.5 km	MPC · JPL
649654	2011 QR_{58}	—	August 31, 2011	Haleakala	Pan-STARRS 1	·	930 m	MPC · JPL
649655	2011 QP_{61}	—	August 26, 2000	Cerro Tololo	Deep Ecliptic Survey	·	2.9 km	MPC · JPL
649656	2011 QV_{61}	—	August 31, 2011	Haleakala	Pan-STARRS 1	·	2.5 km	MPC · JPL
649657	2011 QQ_{62}	—	August 31, 2011	Haleakala	Pan-STARRS 1	NYS	870 m	MPC · JPL
649658	2011 QF_{64}	—	August 31, 2011	Haleakala	Pan-STARRS 1	·	830 m	MPC · JPL
649659	2011 QG_{64}	—	August 31, 2011	Haleakala	Pan-STARRS 1	VER	1.9 km	MPC · JPL
649660	2011 QM_{64}	—	September 27, 2006	Mount Lemmon	Mount Lemmon Survey	·	2.1 km	MPC · JPL
649661	2011 QS_{66}	—	November 15, 2006	Catalina	CSS	·	2.7 km	MPC · JPL
649662	2011 QL_{68}	—	July 28, 2011	Haleakala	Pan-STARRS 1	·	2.3 km	MPC · JPL
649663	2011 QJ_{74}	—	March 19, 2009	Mount Lemmon	Mount Lemmon Survey	EOS	1.8 km	MPC · JPL
649664	2011 QM_{74}	—	August 20, 2011	Haleakala	Pan-STARRS 1	VER	2.8 km	MPC · JPL
649665	2011 QL_{76}	—	August 23, 2011	Haleakala	Pan-STARRS 1	·	2.4 km	MPC · JPL
649666	2011 QT_{83}	—	August 24, 2011	Haleakala	Pan-STARRS 1	NYS	1.1 km	MPC · JPL
649667	2011 QZ_{83}	—	October 14, 2001	Apache Point	SDSS Collaboration	·	1.9 km	MPC · JPL
649668	2011 QE_{84}	—	August 24, 2011	Haleakala	Pan-STARRS 1	HYG	2.1 km	MPC · JPL
649669	2011 QR_{84}	—	July 31, 2011	Haleakala	Pan-STARRS 1	NYS	1.1 km	MPC · JPL
649670	2011 QP_{94}	—	August 31, 2011	Haleakala	Pan-STARRS 1	LIX	2.5 km	MPC · JPL
649671	2011 QU_{96}	—	August 24, 2011	Haleakala	Pan-STARRS 1	·	2.8 km	MPC · JPL
649672	2011 QS_{100}	—	August 29, 2011	Siding Spring	SSS	·	1.9 km	MPC · JPL
649673	2011 QT_{100}	—	August 30, 2011	Haleakala	Pan-STARRS 1	·	2.1 km	MPC · JPL
649674	2011 QH_{101}	—	August 23, 2011	Haleakala	Pan-STARRS 1	EOS	1.5 km	MPC · JPL
649675	2011 QX_{102}	—	April 11, 2015	Mount Lemmon	Mount Lemmon Survey	VER	2.2 km	MPC · JPL
649676	2011 QO_{103}	—	August 27, 2011	Haleakala	Pan-STARRS 1	·	2.9 km	MPC · JPL
649677	2011 QT_{103}	—	January 24, 2014	Haleakala	Pan-STARRS 1	·	3.5 km	MPC · JPL
649678	2011 QP_{105}	—	September 12, 2015	Haleakala	Pan-STARRS 1	·	1.5 km	MPC · JPL
649679	2011 QX_{109}	—	August 27, 2011	Haleakala	Pan-STARRS 1	THM	1.9 km	MPC · JPL
649680	2011 QR_{110}	—	August 26, 2011	Kitt Peak	Spacewatch	THM	1.6 km	MPC · JPL
649681	2011 QB_{114}	—	August 24, 2011	Haleakala	Pan-STARRS 1	·	2.2 km	MPC · JPL
649682	2011 QJ_{114}	—	August 24, 2011	Haleakala	Pan-STARRS 1	NYS	920 m	MPC · JPL
649683	2011 QT_{115}	—	August 31, 2011	Kitt Peak	Spacewatch	·	1.6 km	MPC · JPL
649684	2011 QA_{116}	—	August 30, 2011	Haleakala	Pan-STARRS 1	·	930 m	MPC · JPL
649685	2011 QB_{116}	—	August 24, 2011	Haleakala	Pan-STARRS 1	·	1.5 km	MPC · JPL
649686	2011 RJ_{2}	—	September 30, 2006	Mount Lemmon	Mount Lemmon Survey	HYG	1.9 km	MPC · JPL
649687	2011 RF_{5}	—	September 18, 2006	Kitt Peak	Spacewatch	EOS	1.2 km	MPC · JPL
649688	2011 RK_{6}	—	September 5, 2011	Haleakala	Pan-STARRS 1	·	2.0 km	MPC · JPL
649689	2011 RM_{10}	—	November 18, 2006	Kitt Peak	Spacewatch	·	2.6 km	MPC · JPL
649690	2011 RF_{14}	—	September 4, 2011	Kitt Peak	Spacewatch	L5	6.5 km	MPC · JPL
649691	2011 RH_{17}	—	December 18, 2007	Mount Lemmon	Mount Lemmon Survey	·	1.7 km	MPC · JPL
649692	2011 RG_{18}	—	September 6, 2011	Haleakala	Pan-STARRS 1	·	760 m	MPC · JPL
649693	2011 RM_{21}	—	September 4, 2011	Haleakala	Pan-STARRS 1	·	2.3 km	MPC · JPL
649694	2011 RT_{22}	—	September 4, 2011	Haleakala	Pan-STARRS 1	·	2.6 km	MPC · JPL
649695	2011 RW_{22}	—	July 6, 2016	Haleakala	Pan-STARRS 1	EOS	1.5 km	MPC · JPL
649696	2011 RD_{23}	—	May 9, 2005	Kitt Peak	Spacewatch	·	1.8 km	MPC · JPL
649697	2011 RK_{23}	—	September 23, 2005	Kitt Peak	Spacewatch	·	2.2 km	MPC · JPL
649698	2011 RF_{27}	—	September 4, 2011	Haleakala	Pan-STARRS 1	·	1.8 km	MPC · JPL
649699	2011 RG_{32}	—	September 4, 2011	Haleakala	Pan-STARRS 1	·	1.4 km	MPC · JPL
649700	2011 RC_{40}	—	September 4, 2011	Haleakala	Pan-STARRS 1	·	1.8 km	MPC · JPL

== 649701–649800 ==
back to top

Designation			Discovery			Properties		Ref
Permanent	Provisional	Named after	Date	Site	Discoverer(s)	Category	Diam.	Ref
649701	2011 SE_{1}	—	September 17, 2011	Haleakala	Pan-STARRS 1	·	1 km	MPC · JPL
649702	2011 SQ_{3}	—	September 18, 2011	Mount Lemmon	Mount Lemmon Survey	PHO	660 m	MPC · JPL
649703	2011 SU_{3}	—	June 11, 2011	Mount Lemmon	Mount Lemmon Survey	·	1.5 km	MPC · JPL
649704	2011 SY_{5}	—	November 22, 2006	Catalina	CSS	·	3.2 km	MPC · JPL
649705	2011 SC_{7}	—	September 18, 2011	Kitt Peak	Spacewatch	·	1.0 km	MPC · JPL
649706	2011 SG_{7}	—	September 18, 2011	Kitt Peak	Spacewatch	·	2.3 km	MPC · JPL
649707	2011 ST_{10}	—	September 25, 2006	Kitt Peak	Spacewatch	EOS	1.3 km	MPC · JPL
649708	2011 SX_{17}	—	September 19, 2011	Mount Lemmon	Mount Lemmon Survey	·	2.0 km	MPC · JPL
649709	2011 SY_{17}	—	February 3, 2008	Catalina	CSS	·	2.3 km	MPC · JPL
649710	2011 SO_{19}	—	September 19, 2011	Mount Lemmon	Mount Lemmon Survey	EOS	1.3 km	MPC · JPL
649711	2011 SY_{20}	—	September 20, 2011	Haleakala	Pan-STARRS 1	·	2.7 km	MPC · JPL
649712	2011 SH_{21}	—	May 21, 2010	Nogales	M. Schwartz, P. R. Holvorcem	·	3.5 km	MPC · JPL
649713	2011 SW_{22}	—	September 18, 2011	Mount Lemmon	Mount Lemmon Survey	V	600 m	MPC · JPL
649714	2011 SR_{24}	—	October 20, 1998	Ondřejov	P. Pravec	JUN	1.1 km	MPC · JPL
649715	2011 SU_{26}	—	August 27, 2011	Haleakala	Pan-STARRS 1	·	1.2 km	MPC · JPL
649716	2011 SA_{28}	—	August 6, 2002	Palomar	NEAT	JUN	1.0 km	MPC · JPL
649717	2011 SJ_{28}	—	September 4, 2011	Haleakala	Pan-STARRS 1	JUN	850 m	MPC · JPL
649718	2011 SW_{28}	—	August 26, 2011	La Sagra	OAM	THB	3.1 km	MPC · JPL
649719	2011 SR_{29}	—	September 28, 2006	Kitt Peak	Spacewatch	·	1.9 km	MPC · JPL
649720	2011 SZ_{30}	—	August 23, 2011	Haleakala	Pan-STARRS 1	·	1.0 km	MPC · JPL
649721	2011 SB_{36}	—	December 1, 2006	Mount Lemmon	Mount Lemmon Survey	·	2.0 km	MPC · JPL
649722	2011 SH_{43}	—	January 15, 2007	Mauna Kea	P. A. Wiegert	·	2.3 km	MPC · JPL
649723	2011 SJ_{47}	—	September 20, 2011	Mount Lemmon	Mount Lemmon Survey	·	1.4 km	MPC · JPL
649724	2011 SA_{48}	—	September 20, 2011	Mount Lemmon	Mount Lemmon Survey	·	2.1 km	MPC · JPL
649725	2011 SV_{48}	—	September 20, 2011	Mount Lemmon	Mount Lemmon Survey	·	920 m	MPC · JPL
649726	2011 SW_{49}	—	September 20, 2011	Haleakala	Pan-STARRS 1	·	2.0 km	MPC · JPL
649727	2011 SR_{51}	—	September 22, 2011	Les Engarouines	L. Bernasconi	EOS	1.8 km	MPC · JPL
649728	2011 SQ_{58}	—	September 5, 2007	Mount Lemmon	Mount Lemmon Survey	NYS	820 m	MPC · JPL
649729	2011 SA_{59}	—	September 2, 2011	Haleakala	Pan-STARRS 1	·	870 m	MPC · JPL
649730	2011 SJ_{60}	—	September 19, 2011	Haleakala	Pan-STARRS 1	VER	2.4 km	MPC · JPL
649731	2011 SK_{61}	—	August 27, 2000	Cerro Tololo	Deep Ecliptic Survey	·	2.1 km	MPC · JPL
649732	2011 SW_{61}	—	December 16, 2007	Kitt Peak	Spacewatch	·	1.4 km	MPC · JPL
649733	2011 SZ_{62}	—	January 15, 2007	Mauna Kea	P. A. Wiegert	·	2.5 km	MPC · JPL
649734	2011 SC_{64}	—	September 22, 2011	Kitt Peak	Spacewatch	·	800 m	MPC · JPL
649735	2011 SZ_{70}	—	September 23, 2011	Kitt Peak	Spacewatch	·	2.2 km	MPC · JPL
649736	2011 SM_{71}	—	February 3, 2009	Kitt Peak	Spacewatch	MAS	710 m	MPC · JPL
649737	2011 SD_{73}	—	February 13, 2008	Kitt Peak	Spacewatch	·	2.0 km	MPC · JPL
649738	2011 SE_{73}	—	September 19, 2011	Mount Lemmon	Mount Lemmon Survey	·	2.4 km	MPC · JPL
649739	2011 SF_{74}	—	September 19, 2003	Kitt Peak	Spacewatch	·	830 m	MPC · JPL
649740	2011 SU_{81}	—	February 21, 2009	Kitt Peak	Spacewatch	·	3.0 km	MPC · JPL
649741	2011 SH_{83}	—	August 29, 2005	Kitt Peak	Spacewatch	·	2.8 km	MPC · JPL
649742	2011 SP_{84}	—	September 21, 2011	Kitt Peak	Spacewatch	·	1.0 km	MPC · JPL
649743	2011 SC_{88}	—	August 31, 2005	Palomar	NEAT	·	2.9 km	MPC · JPL
649744	2011 SY_{88}	—	September 22, 2011	Kitt Peak	Spacewatch	·	1.1 km	MPC · JPL
649745	2011 SD_{90}	—	September 22, 2011	Kitt Peak	Spacewatch	·	2.4 km	MPC · JPL
649746	2011 SR_{90}	—	September 22, 2011	Kitt Peak	Spacewatch	·	2.5 km	MPC · JPL
649747	2011 SH_{91}	—	August 19, 2006	Palomar	NEAT	GEF	1.4 km	MPC · JPL
649748	2011 SY_{91}	—	September 22, 2011	Kitt Peak	Spacewatch	VER	2.6 km	MPC · JPL
649749	2011 SG_{96}	—	September 24, 2011	Mount Lemmon	Mount Lemmon Survey	·	1.8 km	MPC · JPL
649750	2011 SJ_{99}	—	September 8, 2011	Kitt Peak	Spacewatch	·	2.1 km	MPC · JPL
649751	2011 SO_{99}	—	September 23, 2011	Haleakala	Pan-STARRS 1	·	2.5 km	MPC · JPL
649752	2011 SC_{104}	—	September 23, 2011	Kitt Peak	Spacewatch	·	1.1 km	MPC · JPL
649753	2011 SP_{107}	—	September 8, 2011	Kitt Peak	Spacewatch	TIR	2.8 km	MPC · JPL
649754	2011 SW_{107}	—	October 17, 2001	Palomar	NEAT	·	2.3 km	MPC · JPL
649755	2011 SZ_{107}	—	October 15, 2004	Mount Lemmon	Mount Lemmon Survey	MAS	740 m	MPC · JPL
649756	2011 SQ_{110}	—	November 2, 2006	Mount Lemmon	Mount Lemmon Survey	·	2.8 km	MPC · JPL
649757	2011 SR_{110}	—	September 16, 2011	La Sagra	OAM	(883)	630 m	MPC · JPL
649758	2011 SU_{113}	—	August 29, 2011	Siding Spring	SSS	·	1.9 km	MPC · JPL
649759	2011 SS_{114}	—	August 29, 2011	Ka-Dar	Gerke, V.	·	2.4 km	MPC · JPL
649760	2011 SA_{119}	—	March 26, 2003	Palomar	NEAT	·	1.0 km	MPC · JPL
649761	2011 SZ_{119}	—	September 7, 2011	Kitt Peak	Spacewatch	·	580 m	MPC · JPL
649762	2011 SQ_{120}	—	August 29, 2005	Kitt Peak	Spacewatch	·	2.7 km	MPC · JPL
649763	2011 SD_{121}	—	September 21, 2011	Kitt Peak	Spacewatch	MAS	570 m	MPC · JPL
649764	2011 SR_{127}	—	September 20, 2011	Kitt Peak	Spacewatch	·	1.0 km	MPC · JPL
649765	2011 SF_{128}	—	September 23, 2011	Haleakala	Pan-STARRS 1	·	1.6 km	MPC · JPL
649766	2011 SM_{129}	—	September 23, 2011	Haleakala	Pan-STARRS 1	THM	1.6 km	MPC · JPL
649767	2011 SJ_{139}	—	February 1, 2009	Kitt Peak	Spacewatch	MAS	640 m	MPC · JPL
649768	2011 SO_{141}	—	September 21, 2011	Kitt Peak	Spacewatch	·	2.7 km	MPC · JPL
649769	2011 SW_{141}	—	September 21, 2011	Kitt Peak	Spacewatch	·	1.0 km	MPC · JPL
649770	2011 SV_{142}	—	September 23, 2011	Haleakala	Pan-STARRS 1	·	1.5 km	MPC · JPL
649771	2011 ST_{146}	—	September 8, 2011	Kitt Peak	Spacewatch	·	2.5 km	MPC · JPL
649772	2011 SU_{146}	—	September 26, 2011	Mount Lemmon	Mount Lemmon Survey	·	2.3 km	MPC · JPL
649773	2011 SH_{147}	—	September 26, 2011	Mount Lemmon	Mount Lemmon Survey	EOS	1.2 km	MPC · JPL
649774	2011 SC_{150}	—	August 23, 2007	Kitt Peak	Spacewatch	·	910 m	MPC · JPL
649775	2011 SK_{151}	—	September 8, 2011	Kitt Peak	Spacewatch	·	2.4 km	MPC · JPL
649776	2011 SJ_{152}	—	September 26, 2011	Haleakala	Pan-STARRS 1	·	2.2 km	MPC · JPL
649777	2011 SA_{153}	—	September 4, 2011	Haleakala	Pan-STARRS 1	·	1.1 km	MPC · JPL
649778	2011 SZ_{153}	—	August 27, 2011	Mayhill-ISON	L. Elenin	·	2.5 km	MPC · JPL
649779	2011 SC_{164}	—	September 23, 2011	Haleakala	Pan-STARRS 1	·	1.1 km	MPC · JPL
649780	2011 SM_{166}	—	October 7, 2001	Palomar	NEAT	·	600 m	MPC · JPL
649781	2011 SJ_{168}	—	May 31, 2003	Cerro Tololo	Deep Ecliptic Survey	NYS	1.1 km	MPC · JPL
649782	2011 SN_{173}	—	April 25, 2003	Kitt Peak	Spacewatch	·	940 m	MPC · JPL
649783	2011 SC_{176}	—	September 9, 2011	Kitt Peak	Spacewatch	·	2.4 km	MPC · JPL
649784	2011 SC_{177}	—	September 26, 2011	Mount Lemmon	Mount Lemmon Survey	·	1.0 km	MPC · JPL
649785	2011 SV_{177}	—	September 28, 2011	Drebach	~Knöfel, A.	·	2.2 km	MPC · JPL
649786	2011 SD_{181}	—	September 26, 2011	Kitt Peak	Spacewatch	·	2.5 km	MPC · JPL
649787	2011 SU_{183}	—	September 13, 2007	Mount Lemmon	Mount Lemmon Survey	NYS	1.2 km	MPC · JPL
649788	2011 SE_{186}	—	July 27, 2005	Palomar	NEAT	·	2.8 km	MPC · JPL
649789	2011 SX_{187}	—	September 22, 2011	Kitt Peak	Spacewatch	·	960 m	MPC · JPL
649790	2011 SZ_{191}	—	September 24, 2011	Haleakala	Pan-STARRS 1	·	2.2 km	MPC · JPL
649791	2011 SX_{194}	—	July 27, 2005	Palomar	NEAT	THB	3.1 km	MPC · JPL
649792 Sergejbondar	2011 SY_{194}	Sergejbondar	September 19, 2011	Zelenchukskaya Stn	T. V. Krjačko, Satovski, B.	·	2.5 km	MPC · JPL
649793	2011 SL_{201}	—	September 14, 2002	Palomar	NEAT	·	1.6 km	MPC · JPL
649794	2011 SU_{202}	—	August 9, 2000	Kitt Peak	Spacewatch	·	3.0 km	MPC · JPL
649795	2011 SX_{204}	—	September 28, 2006	Kitt Peak	Spacewatch	TRE	2.6 km	MPC · JPL
649796	2011 SD_{208}	—	September 4, 2011	Haleakala	Pan-STARRS 1	·	2.1 km	MPC · JPL
649797	2011 SK_{209}	—	September 13, 2007	Mount Lemmon	Mount Lemmon Survey	·	940 m	MPC · JPL
649798	2011 SF_{212}	—	September 21, 2011	Kitt Peak	Spacewatch	·	1.1 km	MPC · JPL
649799	2011 SH_{213}	—	August 27, 2011	Haleakala	Pan-STARRS 1	·	1.9 km	MPC · JPL
649800	2011 SW_{213}	—	March 8, 2008	Mount Lemmon	Mount Lemmon Survey	TIR	2.5 km	MPC · JPL

== 649801–649900 ==
back to top

Designation			Discovery			Properties		Ref
Permanent	Provisional	Named after	Date	Site	Discoverer(s)	Category	Diam.	Ref
649801	2011 SN_{217}	—	September 24, 2011	Mount Lemmon	Mount Lemmon Survey	·	2.2 km	MPC · JPL
649802	2011 SP_{222}	—	September 7, 2000	Kitt Peak	Spacewatch	·	2.1 km	MPC · JPL
649803	2011 SW_{222}	—	August 29, 2011	Siding Spring	SSS	TIR	2.6 km	MPC · JPL
649804	2011 SU_{225}	—	September 23, 2011	Mayhill-ISON	L. Elenin	·	2.8 km	MPC · JPL
649805	2011 SS_{232}	—	May 31, 2003	Cerro Tololo	Deep Ecliptic Survey	MAS	550 m	MPC · JPL
649806	2011 SV_{232}	—	September 30, 2011	Piszkéstető	K. Sárneczky	·	1.7 km	MPC · JPL
649807	2011 SW_{233}	—	September 1, 2011	La Sagra	OAM	·	3.0 km	MPC · JPL
649808	2011 SB_{234}	—	December 22, 2006	Saint-Sulpice	B. Christophe	LIX	3.0 km	MPC · JPL
649809	2011 SF_{234}	—	September 19, 2011	La Sagra	OAM	·	1.1 km	MPC · JPL
649810	2011 SX_{236}	—	September 8, 2011	Kitt Peak	Spacewatch	·	2.2 km	MPC · JPL
649811	2011 SV_{241}	—	September 21, 2011	Catalina	CSS	·	960 m	MPC · JPL
649812	2011 SD_{244}	—	September 26, 2011	Haleakala	Pan-STARRS 1	·	1.6 km	MPC · JPL
649813	2011 SV_{247}	—	September 29, 2011	Kitt Peak	Spacewatch	·	660 m	MPC · JPL
649814	2011 SB_{253}	—	June 30, 2005	Palomar	NEAT	·	3.3 km	MPC · JPL
649815	2011 SG_{253}	—	February 13, 2008	Kitt Peak	Spacewatch	·	2.6 km	MPC · JPL
649816 Marycoates	2011 SK_{255}	Marycoates	September 26, 2011	Mayhill	Falla, N.	EOS	1.7 km	MPC · JPL
649817	2011 ST_{255}	—	March 1, 2009	Kitt Peak	Spacewatch	·	3.1 km	MPC · JPL
649818	2011 SU_{258}	—	September 24, 2011	Mount Lemmon	Mount Lemmon Survey	EOS	1.4 km	MPC · JPL
649819	2011 SH_{263}	—	August 27, 2011	Haleakala	Pan-STARRS 1	·	2.5 km	MPC · JPL
649820	2011 SM_{263}	—	March 27, 2004	Kitt Peak	Spacewatch	·	2.4 km	MPC · JPL
649821	2011 SC_{264}	—	September 28, 2006	Kitt Peak	Spacewatch	·	1.7 km	MPC · JPL
649822	2011 SN_{264}	—	September 4, 2011	Kitt Peak	Spacewatch	·	2.5 km	MPC · JPL
649823	2011 SK_{270}	—	September 5, 2000	Apache Point	SDSS Collaboration	·	2.6 km	MPC · JPL
649824	2011 SR_{271}	—	September 9, 2011	Kitt Peak	Spacewatch	·	2.7 km	MPC · JPL
649825	2011 SR_{272}	—	September 24, 2011	Haleakala	Pan-STARRS 1	·	2.9 km	MPC · JPL
649826	2011 SX_{273}	—	March 23, 2003	Kitt Peak	Spacewatch	·	3.6 km	MPC · JPL
649827	2011 SU_{274}	—	September 24, 2011	Mount Lemmon	Mount Lemmon Survey	·	640 m	MPC · JPL
649828	2011 SF_{275}	—	September 27, 2011	Mayhill-ISON	L. Elenin	·	1.9 km	MPC · JPL
649829	2011 SU_{280}	—	September 23, 2011	Kitt Peak	Spacewatch	(5931)	2.5 km	MPC · JPL
649830	2011 SJ_{281}	—	September 26, 2011	Mount Lemmon	Mount Lemmon Survey	·	2.2 km	MPC · JPL
649831	2011 SY_{283}	—	September 26, 2011	Siding Spring	SSS	·	2.6 km	MPC · JPL
649832	2011 SD_{284}	—	August 30, 2011	Piszkés-tető	K. Sárneczky, S. Kürti	·	2.7 km	MPC · JPL
649833	2011 SP_{284}	—	September 24, 2011	Haleakala	Pan-STARRS 1	·	2.6 km	MPC · JPL
649834	2011 SS_{287}	—	October 2, 2000	Apache Point	SDSS Collaboration	·	2.4 km	MPC · JPL
649835	2011 SG_{290}	—	September 22, 2011	Kitt Peak	Spacewatch	·	2.1 km	MPC · JPL
649836	2011 SB_{291}	—	September 19, 2011	Haleakala	Pan-STARRS 1	·	2.2 km	MPC · JPL
649837	2011 SD_{295}	—	January 3, 2013	Mount Lemmon	Mount Lemmon Survey	·	1 km	MPC · JPL
649838	2011 ST_{296}	—	April 24, 2014	Mount Lemmon	Mount Lemmon Survey	·	950 m	MPC · JPL
649839	2011 SV_{297}	—	January 14, 2013	Mount Lemmon	Mount Lemmon Survey	·	2.3 km	MPC · JPL
649840	2011 SF_{299}	—	April 10, 2013	Haleakala	Pan-STARRS 1	·	490 m	MPC · JPL
649841	2011 SY_{302}	—	September 20, 2011	Kitt Peak	Spacewatch	EOS	1.7 km	MPC · JPL
649842	2011 SA_{307}	—	September 24, 2011	Haleakala	Pan-STARRS 1	EOS	1.6 km	MPC · JPL
649843	2011 SG_{307}	—	September 20, 2011	Haleakala	Pan-STARRS 1	·	690 m	MPC · JPL
649844	2011 SH_{308}	—	September 18, 2011	Mount Lemmon	Mount Lemmon Survey	·	3.0 km	MPC · JPL
649845	2011 SN_{308}	—	September 18, 2011	Mount Lemmon	Mount Lemmon Survey	·	2.3 km	MPC · JPL
649846	2011 SC_{309}	—	September 22, 2011	Kitt Peak	Spacewatch	LIX	2.5 km	MPC · JPL
649847	2011 SZ_{311}	—	September 24, 2011	Haleakala	Pan-STARRS 1	EOS	1.6 km	MPC · JPL
649848	2011 SW_{312}	—	September 25, 2011	Haleakala	Pan-STARRS 1	·	2.2 km	MPC · JPL
649849	2011 SL_{314}	—	September 29, 2011	Mount Lemmon	Mount Lemmon Survey	·	1.9 km	MPC · JPL
649850	2011 SU_{314}	—	September 18, 2011	Mount Lemmon	Mount Lemmon Survey	·	1.7 km	MPC · JPL
649851	2011 SV_{314}	—	September 28, 2011	Kitt Peak	Spacewatch	·	2.2 km	MPC · JPL
649852	2011 SY_{323}	—	September 19, 2011	Haleakala	Pan-STARRS 1	·	1.1 km	MPC · JPL
649853	2011 SB_{330}	—	March 4, 2008	Kitt Peak	Spacewatch	·	2.3 km	MPC · JPL
649854	2011 SW_{331}	—	September 26, 2011	Haleakala	Pan-STARRS 1	·	1.5 km	MPC · JPL
649855	2011 SU_{333}	—	September 4, 2011	Haleakala	Pan-STARRS 1	EUP	3.0 km	MPC · JPL
649856	2011 SB_{334}	—	September 29, 2011	Kitt Peak	Spacewatch	·	2.2 km	MPC · JPL
649857	2011 SH_{334}	—	September 24, 2011	Haleakala	Pan-STARRS 1	·	2.2 km	MPC · JPL
649858	2011 SV_{334}	—	September 26, 2011	Haleakala	Pan-STARRS 1	EOS	1.5 km	MPC · JPL
649859	2011 SN_{339}	—	September 24, 2011	Haleakala	Pan-STARRS 1	·	2.5 km	MPC · JPL
649860	2011 SA_{342}	—	September 30, 2011	Piszkéstető	K. Sárneczky	·	2.0 km	MPC · JPL
649861	2011 SM_{343}	—	September 24, 2011	Haleakala	Pan-STARRS 1	·	2.3 km	MPC · JPL
649862	2011 SN_{343}	—	September 28, 2011	Kitt Peak	Spacewatch	·	1.8 km	MPC · JPL
649863	2011 SK_{346}	—	September 20, 2011	Haleakala	Pan-STARRS 1	·	2.4 km	MPC · JPL
649864	2011 SA_{355}	—	September 23, 2011	Kitt Peak	Spacewatch	·	2.1 km	MPC · JPL
649865	2011 SB_{360}	—	September 20, 2011	Mount Lemmon	Mount Lemmon Survey	·	2.2 km	MPC · JPL
649866	2011 TC_{3}	—	September 21, 2011	Kitt Peak	Spacewatch	·	2.2 km	MPC · JPL
649867	2011 TF_{6}	—	October 2, 2011	Mayhill-ISON	L. Elenin	·	2.5 km	MPC · JPL
649868	2011 TW_{6}	—	December 30, 2007	Kitt Peak	Spacewatch	TEL	1.2 km	MPC · JPL
649869	2011 TT_{7}	—	October 2, 2011	Bergisch Gladbach	W. Bickel	EUP	2.9 km	MPC · JPL
649870	2011 TJ_{9}	—	September 23, 2011	Mayhill-ISON	L. Elenin	526	2.5 km	MPC · JPL
649871	2011 TB_{12}	—	July 31, 2005	Palomar	NEAT	·	3.0 km	MPC · JPL
649872	2011 TG_{12}	—	October 4, 2011	Taunus	Karge, S., Zimmer, U.	LIX	2.8 km	MPC · JPL
649873	2011 TL_{14}	—	October 2, 2011	Mayhill-ISON	L. Elenin	·	2.9 km	MPC · JPL
649874	2011 TO_{14}	—	October 2, 2011	Mayhill-ISON	L. Elenin	LIX	3.1 km	MPC · JPL
649875	2011 TP_{14}	—	October 15, 2001	Palomar	NEAT	·	3.1 km	MPC · JPL
649876	2011 TO_{17}	—	October 15, 2011	Palomar	Palomar Transient Factory	·	2.8 km	MPC · JPL
649877	2011 TC_{18}	—	October 1, 2011	Mount Lemmon	Mount Lemmon Survey	·	1.1 km	MPC · JPL
649878	2011 TR_{18}	—	October 1, 2011	Mount Lemmon	Mount Lemmon Survey	LIX	2.5 km	MPC · JPL
649879	2011 TL_{20}	—	October 1, 2011	Mount Lemmon	Mount Lemmon Survey	·	970 m	MPC · JPL
649880	2011 TO_{20}	—	October 1, 2011	Bergisch Gladbach	W. Bickel	EOS	1.6 km	MPC · JPL
649881	2011 TM_{22}	—	October 1, 2011	Mount Lemmon	Mount Lemmon Survey	·	2.1 km	MPC · JPL
649882	2011 UM_{5}	—	October 11, 2007	Mount Lemmon	Mount Lemmon Survey	·	600 m	MPC · JPL
649883	2011 UV_{11}	—	September 18, 2011	Mount Lemmon	Mount Lemmon Survey	·	2.1 km	MPC · JPL
649884	2011 UO_{12}	—	October 16, 2011	Kitt Peak	Spacewatch	EOS	1.6 km	MPC · JPL
649885	2011 UB_{15}	—	October 19, 2006	Kitt Peak	Spacewatch	·	2.1 km	MPC · JPL
649886	2011 UF_{15}	—	October 17, 2011	Kitt Peak	Spacewatch	EUP	3.2 km	MPC · JPL
649887	2011 UD_{24}	—	November 21, 2006	Kitt Peak	Spacewatch	·	2.0 km	MPC · JPL
649888	2011 UV_{24}	—	October 17, 2011	Kitt Peak	Spacewatch	·	2.1 km	MPC · JPL
649889	2011 UT_{26}	—	October 17, 2011	Kitt Peak	Spacewatch	THM	1.7 km	MPC · JPL
649890	2011 UQ_{31}	—	October 11, 2006	Palomar	NEAT	·	2.3 km	MPC · JPL
649891	2011 UE_{32}	—	September 24, 2011	Mayhill-ISON	L. Elenin	·	3.5 km	MPC · JPL
649892	2011 UD_{33}	—	August 27, 2005	Palomar	NEAT	·	2.6 km	MPC · JPL
649893	2011 UL_{33}	—	September 29, 2011	Mount Lemmon	Mount Lemmon Survey	·	1.1 km	MPC · JPL
649894	2011 UN_{33}	—	September 21, 2011	Kitt Peak	Spacewatch	LIX	3.0 km	MPC · JPL
649895	2011 UL_{34}	—	March 2, 2006	Kitt Peak	Spacewatch	·	1.2 km	MPC · JPL
649896	2011 UK_{36}	—	October 19, 2011	Mount Lemmon	Mount Lemmon Survey	TIR	2.4 km	MPC · JPL
649897	2011 UY_{42}	—	September 10, 2007	Kitt Peak	Spacewatch	·	1.0 km	MPC · JPL
649898	2011 UM_{44}	—	September 26, 2011	Kitt Peak	Spacewatch	·	1.1 km	MPC · JPL
649899	2011 UJ_{45}	—	September 24, 2011	Haleakala	Pan-STARRS 1	·	1.9 km	MPC · JPL
649900	2011 UV_{58}	—	October 18, 2001	Palomar	NEAT	·	590 m	MPC · JPL

== 649901–650000 ==
back to top

Designation			Discovery			Properties		Ref
Permanent	Provisional	Named after	Date	Site	Discoverer(s)	Category	Diam.	Ref
649901	2011 UT_{67}	—	September 24, 2011	Haleakala	Pan-STARRS 1	T_{j} (2.96)	3.5 km	MPC · JPL
649902	2011 UA_{70}	—	August 30, 2005	Kitt Peak	Spacewatch	·	2.3 km	MPC · JPL
649903	2011 UO_{75}	—	November 17, 2000	Kitt Peak	Spacewatch	·	2.3 km	MPC · JPL
649904	2011 UC_{77}	—	October 19, 2011	Kitt Peak	Spacewatch	VER	2.3 km	MPC · JPL
649905	2011 UU_{77}	—	October 19, 2011	Kitt Peak	Spacewatch	·	730 m	MPC · JPL
649906	2011 UH_{79}	—	October 19, 2011	Kitt Peak	Spacewatch	EOS	2.1 km	MPC · JPL
649907	2011 UP_{79}	—	October 19, 2011	Kitt Peak	Spacewatch	·	2.2 km	MPC · JPL
649908	2011 UF_{80}	—	October 19, 2011	Kitt Peak	Spacewatch	HYG	2.4 km	MPC · JPL
649909	2011 UH_{97}	—	November 22, 2006	Kitt Peak	Spacewatch	·	2.1 km	MPC · JPL
649910	2011 UD_{103}	—	September 11, 2007	Kitt Peak	Spacewatch	NYS	1.0 km	MPC · JPL
649911	2011 UA_{105}	—	September 26, 2011	Bergisch Gladbach	W. Bickel	·	3.0 km	MPC · JPL
649912	2011 UH_{106}	—	October 16, 2003	Palomar	NEAT	H	520 m	MPC · JPL
649913	2011 UU_{109}	—	October 18, 2011	Piszkés-tető	K. Sárneczky, A. Szing	LIX	3.1 km	MPC · JPL
649914	2011 UJ_{110}	—	October 21, 2011	Mount Lemmon	Mount Lemmon Survey	EOS	1.6 km	MPC · JPL
649915	2011 UC_{117}	—	September 9, 2011	Kitt Peak	Spacewatch	·	910 m	MPC · JPL
649916	2011 UB_{119}	—	August 30, 2005	Palomar	NEAT	·	2.8 km	MPC · JPL
649917	2011 UC_{126}	—	October 20, 2011	Kitt Peak	Spacewatch	·	2.5 km	MPC · JPL
649918	2011 UU_{130}	—	October 5, 2011	Piszkéstető	K. Sárneczky	·	2.0 km	MPC · JPL
649919	2011 UA_{139}	—	March 23, 2003	Apache Point	SDSS Collaboration	·	1.9 km	MPC · JPL
649920	2011 UE_{147}	—	October 24, 2011	Haleakala	Pan-STARRS 1	HYG	2.2 km	MPC · JPL
649921	2011 UX_{149}	—	January 29, 2009	Mount Lemmon	Mount Lemmon Survey	·	3.0 km	MPC · JPL
649922	2011 UT_{156}	—	September 24, 2011	Haleakala	Pan-STARRS 1	T_{j} (2.99) · EUP	2.4 km	MPC · JPL
649923	2011 UV_{161}	—	September 13, 2007	Kitt Peak	Spacewatch	NYS	910 m	MPC · JPL
649924	2011 UT_{169}	—	October 21, 2011	Mount Lemmon	Mount Lemmon Survey	EOS	1.7 km	MPC · JPL
649925	2011 UR_{174}	—	October 23, 2011	Haleakala	Pan-STARRS 1	·	2.5 km	MPC · JPL
649926	2011 UP_{175}	—	October 22, 2003	Apache Point	SDSS Collaboration	·	1.2 km	MPC · JPL
649927	2011 UV_{175}	—	March 29, 2008	Catalina	CSS	·	3.5 km	MPC · JPL
649928	2011 UU_{176}	—	October 20, 2011	Kitt Peak	Spacewatch	fast	2.0 km	MPC · JPL
649929	2011 UY_{180}	—	October 14, 2007	Mount Lemmon	Mount Lemmon Survey	·	830 m	MPC · JPL
649930	2011 UC_{185}	—	October 25, 2011	Haleakala	Pan-STARRS 1	HYG	2.4 km	MPC · JPL
649931	2011 UL_{185}	—	April 1, 2003	Apache Point	SDSS Collaboration	·	3.2 km	MPC · JPL
649932	2011 UH_{186}	—	May 17, 2009	Mount Lemmon	Mount Lemmon Survey	EOS	1.7 km	MPC · JPL
649933	2011 UK_{188}	—	October 26, 2011	Mayhill-ISON	L. Elenin	·	3.4 km	MPC · JPL
649934	2011 US_{188}	—	October 26, 2011	Haleakala	Pan-STARRS 1	·	2.6 km	MPC · JPL
649935	2011 UF_{195}	—	September 25, 2011	Haleakala	Pan-STARRS 1	·	2.6 km	MPC · JPL
649936	2011 UN_{198}	—	October 25, 2011	Kitt Peak	Spacewatch	·	2.3 km	MPC · JPL
649937	2011 UD_{203}	—	October 26, 2011	Haleakala	Pan-STARRS 1	·	770 m	MPC · JPL
649938	2011 UJ_{204}	—	October 26, 2011	Haleakala	Pan-STARRS 1	MAS	670 m	MPC · JPL
649939	2011 UW_{204}	—	October 4, 2011	Piszkéstető	K. Sárneczky	MAR	1.3 km	MPC · JPL
649940	2011 UG_{205}	—	October 20, 2011	Haleakala	Pan-STARRS 1	·	2.9 km	MPC · JPL
649941	2011 UM_{205}	—	August 29, 2006	Catalina	CSS	WIT	1.2 km	MPC · JPL
649942	2011 UR_{205}	—	September 24, 2011	Haleakala	Pan-STARRS 1	HYG	2.5 km	MPC · JPL
649943	2011 UN_{210}	—	February 13, 2008	Mount Lemmon	Mount Lemmon Survey	·	2.3 km	MPC · JPL
649944	2011 UY_{211}	—	November 15, 2006	Kitt Peak	Spacewatch	·	1.9 km	MPC · JPL
649945	2011 UJ_{212}	—	October 24, 2011	Mount Lemmon	Mount Lemmon Survey	·	3.0 km	MPC · JPL
649946	2011 UE_{216}	—	November 1, 2006	Kitt Peak	Spacewatch	·	1.7 km	MPC · JPL
649947	2011 UE_{220}	—	August 10, 2007	Kitt Peak	Spacewatch	·	930 m	MPC · JPL
649948	2011 UT_{221}	—	March 6, 2008	Mount Lemmon	Mount Lemmon Survey	EOS	1.5 km	MPC · JPL
649949	2011 UN_{225}	—	October 24, 2011	Mount Lemmon	Mount Lemmon Survey	·	1.8 km	MPC · JPL
649950	2011 UM_{226}	—	April 27, 2009	Mount Lemmon	Mount Lemmon Survey	·	2.3 km	MPC · JPL
649951	2011 UJ_{237}	—	September 9, 2007	Mount Lemmon	Mount Lemmon Survey	NYS	910 m	MPC · JPL
649952	2011 US_{238}	—	October 7, 2005	Kitt Peak	Spacewatch	·	2.0 km	MPC · JPL
649953	2011 UC_{241}	—	September 21, 2011	Kitt Peak	Spacewatch	·	2.3 km	MPC · JPL
649954	2011 UY_{241}	—	September 27, 2011	Mount Lemmon	Mount Lemmon Survey	·	2.7 km	MPC · JPL
649955	2011 UC_{245}	—	October 26, 2011	Kitt Peak	Spacewatch	·	2.2 km	MPC · JPL
649956	2011 UB_{247}	—	August 30, 2002	Palomar	NEAT	·	1.6 km	MPC · JPL
649957	2011 UV_{253}	—	February 11, 2004	Palomar	NEAT	·	1.8 km	MPC · JPL
649958	2011 UF_{254}	—	October 18, 2011	Kitt Peak	Spacewatch	·	2.6 km	MPC · JPL
649959	2011 UW_{256}	—	October 24, 2011	Catalina	CSS	·	2.0 km	MPC · JPL
649960	2011 UO_{257}	—	October 24, 2011	Haleakala	Pan-STARRS 1	·	2.6 km	MPC · JPL
649961	2011 UH_{258}	—	October 18, 2011	Mount Lemmon	Mount Lemmon Survey	·	2.2 km	MPC · JPL
649962	2011 UL_{260}	—	August 22, 2003	Palomar	NEAT	NYS	990 m	MPC · JPL
649963	2011 UF_{261}	—	October 19, 2011	Kitt Peak	Spacewatch	·	2.4 km	MPC · JPL
649964 Friedrichvolck	2011 UP_{269}	Friedrichvolck	October 29, 2011	ESA OGS	ESA OGS	·	3.0 km	MPC · JPL
649965	2011 UA_{270}	—	August 12, 2006	Palomar	NEAT	·	1.9 km	MPC · JPL
649966	2011 UW_{271}	—	January 27, 2007	Mount Lemmon	Mount Lemmon Survey	·	2.7 km	MPC · JPL
649967	2011 UO_{272}	—	November 1, 2006	Mount Lemmon	Mount Lemmon Survey	·	2.3 km	MPC · JPL
649968	2011 UJ_{273}	—	October 30, 2011	Mount Lemmon	Mount Lemmon Survey	·	2.3 km	MPC · JPL
649969	2011 UN_{278}	—	March 12, 2008	Kitt Peak	Spacewatch	·	2.2 km	MPC · JPL
649970	2011 UR_{278}	—	October 25, 2011	Haleakala	Pan-STARRS 1	(1298)	2.2 km	MPC · JPL
649971	2011 UH_{283}	—	November 27, 2006	Kitt Peak	Spacewatch	·	1.5 km	MPC · JPL
649972	2011 UD_{285}	—	September 13, 2007	Mount Lemmon	Mount Lemmon Survey	·	1.2 km	MPC · JPL
649973	2011 UJ_{285}	—	October 20, 2011	Mount Lemmon	Mount Lemmon Survey	·	2.1 km	MPC · JPL
649974	2011 UO_{289}	—	October 28, 2011	Mount Lemmon	Mount Lemmon Survey	·	2.2 km	MPC · JPL
649975	2011 UF_{290}	—	September 24, 2011	Haleakala	Pan-STARRS 1	·	2.1 km	MPC · JPL
649976	2011 UX_{295}	—	October 7, 2005	Kitt Peak	Spacewatch	·	2.2 km	MPC · JPL
649977	2011 UR_{297}	—	October 29, 2011	Kitt Peak	Spacewatch	THM	1.8 km	MPC · JPL
649978	2011 UQ_{298}	—	October 15, 2007	Kitt Peak	Spacewatch	·	770 m	MPC · JPL
649979	2011 UV_{299}	—	October 19, 2011	Mount Lemmon	Mount Lemmon Survey	·	3.0 km	MPC · JPL
649980	2011 UG_{301}	—	October 30, 2011	Mount Lemmon	Mount Lemmon Survey	·	2.3 km	MPC · JPL
649981 Fainarubleva	2011 UW_{308}	Fainarubleva	October 28, 2011	Zelenchukskaya Stn	T. V. Krjačko, Satovski, B.	·	2.5 km	MPC · JPL
649982	2011 UH_{309}	—	September 25, 2011	Haleakala	Pan-STARRS 1	·	3.5 km	MPC · JPL
649983	2011 UW_{309}	—	September 12, 2007	Kitt Peak	Spacewatch	MAS	600 m	MPC · JPL
649984	2011 UD_{313}	—	November 27, 2000	Kitt Peak	Spacewatch	·	2.1 km	MPC · JPL
649985	2011 UR_{315}	—	October 30, 2011	Kitt Peak	Spacewatch	PHO	810 m	MPC · JPL
649986	2011 UD_{320}	—	October 30, 2011	Kitt Peak	Spacewatch	·	1.0 km	MPC · JPL
649987	2011 UJ_{322}	—	October 31, 2011	Ka-Dar	Gerke, V.	·	1.1 km	MPC · JPL
649988	2011 UD_{324}	—	September 26, 2011	Kitt Peak	Spacewatch	EOS	1.6 km	MPC · JPL
649989	2011 UQ_{327}	—	April 20, 2009	Kitt Peak	Spacewatch	·	3.1 km	MPC · JPL
649990	2011 UK_{330}	—	December 22, 2006	Kitt Peak	Spacewatch	·	2.1 km	MPC · JPL
649991	2011 UL_{331}	—	September 25, 2005	Kitt Peak	Spacewatch	URS	3.2 km	MPC · JPL
649992	2011 UR_{331}	—	October 24, 2011	Haleakala	Pan-STARRS 1	·	3.1 km	MPC · JPL
649993	2011 UN_{332}	—	September 24, 2011	Haleakala	Pan-STARRS 1	·	2.7 km	MPC · JPL
649994	2011 UN_{333}	—	October 29, 2011	Haleakala	Pan-STARRS 1	·	1.1 km	MPC · JPL
649995	2011 UF_{335}	—	September 22, 2011	Catalina	CSS	·	3.2 km	MPC · JPL
649996	2011 UO_{335}	—	September 26, 2011	Mount Lemmon	Mount Lemmon Survey	3:2 · SHU	3.9 km	MPC · JPL
649997	2011 UC_{338}	—	September 21, 2011	Kitt Peak	Spacewatch	·	2.4 km	MPC · JPL
649998	2011 UZ_{340}	—	September 18, 2003	Kitt Peak	Spacewatch	3:2 · SHU	3.1 km	MPC · JPL
649999	2011 UK_{345}	—	October 19, 2011	Haleakala	Pan-STARRS 1	·	1.9 km	MPC · JPL
650000	2011 UL_{345}	—	November 17, 2006	Mount Lemmon	Mount Lemmon Survey	·	2.3 km	MPC · JPL

back to top

== Meaning of names ==
As minor planet discoveries are confirmed, they are given a permanent number by the IAU's Minor Planet Center (MPC), and the discoverers can then submit names for them, following the IAU's naming conventions. The list below concerns those minor planets in the specified number-range that have received names, and explains the meanings of those names.

Official naming citations of newly named small Solar System bodies are approved and published in a bulletin by IAU's Working Group for Small Bodies Nomenclature (WGSBN). Before May 2021, citations were published in MPC's Minor Planet Circulars for many decades. Recent citations can also be found on the JPL Small-Body Database (SBDB). Until his death in 2016, German astronomer Lutz D. Schmadel compiled these citations into the Dictionary of Minor Planet Names (DMP) and regularly updated the collection.

Based on Paul Herget's The Names of the Minor Planets, Schmadel also researched the unclear origin of numerous asteroids, most of which had been named prior to World War II. This article incorporates text from this source, which is in the public domain: SBDB New namings may only be added to this list below after official publication as the preannouncement of names is condemned. The WGSBN publishes a comprehensive guideline for the naming rules of non-cometary small Solar System bodies.

Named minor planet	Provisional	This minor planet was named for...	Ref · Catalog
649238 Marsloire	2011 BK_{56}	Mars, a small village in the Loire department in the Auvergne-Rhône-Alpes region of France.	IAU · 649238
649792 Sergejbondar	2011 SY_{194}	Sergej Bondar (1950–2018), Russian design engineer and science manager.	IAU · 649792
649816 Marycoates	2011 SK_{255}	Mary Elizabeth Coates (born 1943), worked as a nurse and sheltered-housing warden in Scotland and England. She is also the widow of Michael Coates, a friend of the discoverer.	IAU · 649816
649964 Friedrichvolck	2011 UP_{269}	Friedrich W. Volck (born 1954), German physics, astronomy and mathematics teacher.	IAU · 649964
649981 Fainarubleva	2011 UW_{308}	Faina Rubleva (b. 1951) is a Russian educator, astronomy popularizer, and scientific director of the Moscow Planetarium. Over 47 years in service there, she held many roles, including curator during its closure. Under her leadership, two science museums and an astronomy park were created, along with numerous films and educational programs.	IAU · 649981
