= List of minor planets: 757001–758000 =

The following is a partial list of minor planets, running from minor-planet number 757001 through 758000, inclusive. The primary data for this and other partial lists is based on JPL's "Small-Body Orbital Elements" and data available from the Minor Planet Center. Critical list information is also provided by the MPC, unless otherwise specified from Lowell Observatory. A detailed description of the table's columns and additional sources are given on the main page including a complete list of every page in this series, and a statistical break-up on the dynamical classification of minor planets.

Also see the summary list of all named bodies in numerical and alphabetical order, and the corresponding naming citations for the number range of this particular list. New namings may only be added to this list after official publication, as the preannouncement of names is condemned by the Working Group for Small Bodies Nomenclature of the International Astronomical Union.

| Near-Earth obj. | MBA (inner) | MBA (outer) | Centaur |
| Mars-crosser | MBA (middle) | Jupiter trojan | Trans-Neptunian obj. |
| Unclassified |

== 757001–757100 ==
| Designation | | | Discovery | | | Properties | | Ref |
| Permanent | Provisional | Named after | Date | Site | Discoverer(s) | Category | Diam. | Ref |
|---|---|---|---|---|---|---|---|---|
| 757001 | 1993 OM_{1} | — | July 24, 1993 | Kitt Peak | Spacewatch | EUN | 940 m | MPC · JPL |
| 757002 | 1994 AF_{9} | — | January 8, 1994 | Kitt Peak | Spacewatch | · | 520 m | MPC · JPL |
| 757003 | 1994 JH_{7} | — | May 5, 1994 | Kitt Peak | Spacewatch | · | 750 m | MPC · JPL |
| 757004 | 1994 RU_{6} | — | September 12, 1994 | Kitt Peak | Spacewatch | · | 1.8 km | MPC · JPL |
| 757005 | 1994 TH_{11} | — | October 10, 1994 | Kitt Peak | Spacewatch | ADE | 1.3 km | MPC · JPL |
| 757006 | 1995 QJ_{17} | — | November 27, 2009 | Mount Lemmon | Mount Lemmon Survey | · | 1.8 km | MPC · JPL |
| 757007 | 1995 SJ_{9} | — | September 17, 1995 | Kitt Peak | Spacewatch | URS | 2.2 km | MPC · JPL |
| 757008 | 1995 SW_{36} | — | September 24, 1995 | Kitt Peak | Spacewatch | · | 1.7 km | MPC · JPL |
| 757009 | 1995 SZ_{44} | — | September 25, 1995 | Kitt Peak | Spacewatch | · | 1.1 km | MPC · JPL |
| 757010 | 1995 SA_{49} | — | September 21, 1995 | Kitt Peak | Spacewatch | · | 410 m | MPC · JPL |
| 757011 | 1995 SO_{49} | — | September 22, 1995 | Kitt Peak | Spacewatch | HOF | 1.7 km | MPC · JPL |
| 757012 | 1995 SQ_{51} | — | September 26, 1995 | Kitt Peak | Spacewatch | · | 1.6 km | MPC · JPL |
| 757013 | 1995 SX_{57} | — | September 22, 1995 | Kitt Peak | Spacewatch | · | 2.2 km | MPC · JPL |
| 757014 | 1995 SE_{63} | — | September 25, 1995 | Kitt Peak | Spacewatch | V | 430 m | MPC · JPL |
| 757015 | 1995 SS_{66} | — | September 17, 1995 | Kitt Peak | Spacewatch | · | 800 m | MPC · JPL |
| 757016 | 1995 SO_{73} | — | September 29, 1995 | Kitt Peak | Spacewatch | THM | 1.8 km | MPC · JPL |
| 757017 | 1995 SX_{90} | — | September 24, 1995 | Kitt Peak | Spacewatch | (1118) | 2.5 km | MPC · JPL |
| 757018 | 1995 TW_{11} | — | October 15, 1995 | Kitt Peak | Spacewatch | · | 1.5 km | MPC · JPL |
| 757019 | 1995 UN_{57} | — | October 16, 1995 | Kitt Peak | Spacewatch | · | 890 m | MPC · JPL |
| 757020 | 1995 UH_{68} | — | October 19, 1995 | Kitt Peak | Spacewatch | · | 2.3 km | MPC · JPL |
| 757021 | 1995 UZ_{68} | — | October 19, 1995 | Kitt Peak | Spacewatch | · | 410 m | MPC · JPL |
| 757022 | 1995 UE_{71} | — | October 20, 1995 | Kitt Peak | Spacewatch | HYG | 2.1 km | MPC · JPL |
| 757023 | 1995 VY_{14} | — | November 15, 1995 | Kitt Peak | Spacewatch | EUN | 950 m | MPC · JPL |
| 757024 | 1995 WH_{9} | — | November 16, 1995 | Kitt Peak | Spacewatch | · | 900 m | MPC · JPL |
| 757025 | 1995 WP_{19} | — | November 17, 1995 | Kitt Peak | Spacewatch | · | 730 m | MPC · JPL |
| 757026 | 1995 WV_{29} | — | November 19, 1995 | Kitt Peak | Spacewatch | · | 800 m | MPC · JPL |
| 757027 | 1996 RR_{8} | — | September 6, 1996 | Kitt Peak | Spacewatch | · | 1.1 km | MPC · JPL |
| 757028 | 1996 RH_{15} | — | September 13, 1996 | Kitt Peak | Spacewatch | · | 960 m | MPC · JPL |
| 757029 | 1996 RN_{20} | — | September 15, 1996 | Kitt Peak | Spacewatch | · | 1.8 km | MPC · JPL |
| 757030 | 1996 VQ_{37} | — | November 13, 1996 | Kitt Peak | Spacewatch | · | 2.0 km | MPC · JPL |
| 757031 | 1996 VJ_{42} | — | September 22, 2014 | Haleakala | Pan-STARRS 1 | AGN | 860 m | MPC · JPL |
| 757032 | 1996 XN_{29} | — | December 13, 1996 | Kitt Peak | Spacewatch | VER | 2.2 km | MPC · JPL |
| 757033 | 1996 XA_{38} | — | December 4, 1996 | Kitt Peak | Spacewatch | · | 580 m | MPC · JPL |
| 757034 | 1997 JS_{10} | — | May 6, 1997 | Kitt Peak | Spacewatch | · | 1.1 km | MPC · JPL |
| 757035 | 1997 WO_{19} | — | November 24, 1997 | Kitt Peak | Spacewatch | · | 1.3 km | MPC · JPL |
| 757036 | 1998 DA_{25} | — | February 23, 1998 | Kitt Peak | Spacewatch | · | 2.0 km | MPC · JPL |
| 757037 | 1998 QU_{59} | — | August 26, 1998 | Kitt Peak | Spacewatch | · | 1.2 km | MPC · JPL |
| 757038 | 1998 RA_{22} | — | September 15, 1998 | Kitt Peak | Spacewatch | · | 620 m | MPC · JPL |
| 757039 | 1998 SL_{18} | — | September 18, 1998 | Kitt Peak | Spacewatch | · | 1.0 km | MPC · JPL |
| 757040 | 1998 SY_{179} | — | March 1, 2011 | Mount Lemmon | Mount Lemmon Survey | · | 890 m | MPC · JPL |
| 757041 | 1998 SC_{180} | — | March 11, 2005 | Mount Lemmon | Mount Lemmon Survey | · | 1.3 km | MPC · JPL |
| 757042 | 1998 SF_{180} | — | September 19, 1998 | Apache Point | SDSS | NYS | 710 m | MPC · JPL |
| 757043 | 1998 SL_{180} | — | August 10, 2007 | Kitt Peak | Spacewatch | · | 1.4 km | MPC · JPL |
| 757044 | 1998 TA_{29} | — | October 15, 1998 | Kitt Peak | Spacewatch | · | 1.4 km | MPC · JPL |
| 757045 | 1998 VM_{57} | — | November 14, 1998 | Kitt Peak | Spacewatch | · | 1.1 km | MPC · JPL |
| 757046 | 1999 AZ_{27} | — | December 17, 2009 | Mount Lemmon | Mount Lemmon Survey | · | 2.2 km | MPC · JPL |
| 757047 | 1999 AQ_{36} | — | January 12, 1999 | Mauna Kea | Veillet, C., Anderson, J. | · | 1.8 km | MPC · JPL |
| 757048 | 1999 AX_{39} | — | January 10, 1999 | Kitt Peak | Spacewatch | · | 1.4 km | MPC · JPL |
| 757049 | 1999 CE_{143} | — | February 8, 1999 | Mauna Kea | Veillet, C., Anderson, J. | · | 1.7 km | MPC · JPL |
| 757050 | 1999 FT_{99} | — | March 31, 2008 | Mount Lemmon | Mount Lemmon Survey | · | 1.2 km | MPC · JPL |
| 757051 | 1999 KR_{21} | — | March 19, 2009 | Mount Lemmon | Mount Lemmon Survey | · | 560 m | MPC · JPL |
| 757052 | 1999 PJ_{9} | — | March 19, 2009 | Mount Lemmon | Mount Lemmon Survey | · | 650 m | MPC · JPL |
| 757053 | 1999 RB_{251} | — | September 5, 1999 | Kitt Peak | Spacewatch | · | 590 m | MPC · JPL |
| 757054 | 1999 RB_{261} | — | September 5, 1999 | Kitt Peak | Spacewatch | · | 1.2 km | MPC · JPL |
| 757055 | 1999 SB_{29} | — | June 19, 2013 | Mount Lemmon | Mount Lemmon Survey | · | 630 m | MPC · JPL |
| 757056 | 1999 TV_{45} | — | October 3, 1999 | Kitt Peak | Spacewatch | VER | 1.8 km | MPC · JPL |
| 757057 | 1999 TA_{48} | — | October 4, 1999 | Kitt Peak | Spacewatch | · | 890 m | MPC · JPL |
| 757058 | 1999 TG_{67} | — | October 8, 1999 | Kitt Peak | Spacewatch | · | 880 m | MPC · JPL |
| 757059 | 1999 TP_{175} | — | October 10, 1999 | Socorro | LINEAR | · | 580 m | MPC · JPL |
| 757060 | 1999 TD_{339} | — | September 22, 2008 | Kitt Peak | Spacewatch | · | 1.3 km | MPC · JPL |
| 757061 | 1999 TY_{340} | — | December 14, 2003 | Kitt Peak | Spacewatch | · | 750 m | MPC · JPL |
| 757062 | 1999 TE_{341} | — | October 3, 1999 | Kitt Peak | Spacewatch | · | 560 m | MPC · JPL |
| 757063 | 1999 TK_{341} | — | October 6, 1999 | Kitt Peak | Spacewatch | · | 780 m | MPC · JPL |
| 757064 | 1999 TL_{343} | — | October 3, 1999 | Kitt Peak | Spacewatch | · | 2.4 km | MPC · JPL |
| 757065 | 1999 UX_{4} | — | October 13, 1999 | Kitt Peak | Spacewatch | · | 2.5 km | MPC · JPL |
| 757066 | 1999 UM_{35} | — | October 31, 1999 | Kitt Peak | Spacewatch | · | 900 m | MPC · JPL |
| 757067 | 1999 UN_{66} | — | August 12, 2013 | Haleakala | Pan-STARRS 1 | KOR | 1.0 km | MPC · JPL |
| 757068 | 1999 US_{66} | — | October 30, 1999 | Kitt Peak | Spacewatch | JUN | 800 m | MPC · JPL |
| 757069 | 1999 VZ_{39} | — | October 30, 1999 | Kitt Peak | Spacewatch | BRG | 1.1 km | MPC · JPL |
| 757070 | 1999 VO_{120} | — | November 4, 1999 | Kitt Peak | Spacewatch | · | 620 m | MPC · JPL |
| 757071 | 1999 VL_{122} | — | November 4, 1999 | Kitt Peak | Spacewatch | · | 1.1 km | MPC · JPL |
| 757072 | 1999 VJ_{218} | — | November 5, 1999 | Kitt Peak | Spacewatch | · | 1.6 km | MPC · JPL |
| 757073 | 1999 VX_{232} | — | November 7, 2008 | Kitt Peak | Spacewatch | · | 1.2 km | MPC · JPL |
| 757074 | 1999 WA_{22} | — | November 17, 1999 | Kitt Peak | Spacewatch | MAR | 710 m | MPC · JPL |
| 757075 | 1999 XS_{266} | — | September 2, 2011 | Haleakala | Pan-STARRS 1 | · | 850 m | MPC · JPL |
| 757076 | 1999 YB_{20} | — | December 30, 1999 | Mauna Kea | Veillet, C. | EOS | 1.2 km | MPC · JPL |
| 757077 | 1999 YV_{20} | — | December 30, 1999 | Mauna Kea | C. Veillet, I. Gable | L4 | 6.0 km | MPC · JPL |
| 757078 | 2000 AL_{210} | — | January 5, 2000 | Kitt Peak | Spacewatch | L4 | 8.8 km | MPC · JPL |
| 757079 | 2000 BU_{36} | — | January 30, 2000 | Kitt Peak | Spacewatch | · | 700 m | MPC · JPL |
| 757080 | 2000 BB_{44} | — | January 10, 2008 | Mount Lemmon | Mount Lemmon Survey | · | 830 m | MPC · JPL |
| 757081 | 2000 BZ_{50} | — | January 16, 2000 | Kitt Peak | Spacewatch | · | 1.9 km | MPC · JPL |
| 757082 | 2000 BA_{53} | — | November 17, 2006 | Kitt Peak | Spacewatch | · | 650 m | MPC · JPL |
| 757083 | 2000 CH_{73} | — | February 7, 2000 | Kitt Peak | Spacewatch | · | 1.5 km | MPC · JPL |
| 757084 | 2000 CO_{107} | — | February 7, 2000 | Kitt Peak | Spacewatch | · | 1.0 km | MPC · JPL |
| 757085 | 2000 CZ_{110} | — | February 4, 2000 | Kitt Peak | Spacewatch | · | 1.3 km | MPC · JPL |
| 757086 | 2000 CA_{134} | — | February 4, 2000 | Kitt Peak | Spacewatch | · | 1.4 km | MPC · JPL |
| 757087 | 2000 CW_{138} | — | February 5, 2000 | Kitt Peak | Spacewatch | MRX | 780 m | MPC · JPL |
| 757088 | 2000 CE_{153} | — | February 10, 2011 | Mount Lemmon | Mount Lemmon Survey | · | 2.0 km | MPC · JPL |
| 757089 | 2000 CZ_{153} | — | July 23, 2015 | Haleakala | Pan-STARRS 2 | · | 1.1 km | MPC · JPL |
| 757090 | 2000 CZ_{155} | — | May 7, 2014 | Haleakala | Pan-STARRS 1 | · | 1.2 km | MPC · JPL |
| 757091 | 2000 CL_{157} | — | February 5, 2000 | Kitt Peak | M. W. Buie, R. L. Millis | · | 1 km | MPC · JPL |
| 757092 | 2000 EE_{23} | — | April 1, 2016 | Haleakala | Pan-STARRS 1 | EOS | 1.3 km | MPC · JPL |
| 757093 | 2000 EN_{99} | — | March 12, 2000 | Kitt Peak | Spacewatch | EUN | 810 m | MPC · JPL |
| 757094 | 2000 EP_{177} | — | March 3, 2000 | Kitt Peak | Spacewatch | VER | 2.2 km | MPC · JPL |
| 757095 | 2000 ES_{188} | — | March 3, 2000 | Socorro | LINEAR | · | 2.3 km | MPC · JPL |
| 757096 | 2000 EC_{210} | — | December 13, 2015 | Haleakala | Pan-STARRS 1 | · | 2.2 km | MPC · JPL |
| 757097 | 2000 EY_{210} | — | September 28, 2008 | Mount Lemmon | Mount Lemmon Survey | · | 1.8 km | MPC · JPL |
| 757098 | 2000 EK_{211} | — | January 24, 2015 | Haleakala | Pan-STARRS 1 | EOS | 1.6 km | MPC · JPL |
| 757099 | 2000 EL_{211} | — | November 1, 2015 | Mount Lemmon | Mount Lemmon Survey | · | 920 m | MPC · JPL |
| 757100 | 2000 EC_{212} | — | May 18, 2015 | Haleakala | Pan-STARRS 1 | V | 460 m | MPC · JPL |

== 757101–757200 ==
back to top

| Designation | | | Discovery | | | Properties | | Ref |
| Permanent | Provisional | Named after | Date | Site | Discoverer(s) | Category | Diam. | Ref |
|---|---|---|---|---|---|---|---|---|
| 757101 | 2000 GY_{187} | — | April 6, 2000 | Kitt Peak | Spacewatch | HNS | 1.0 km | MPC · JPL |
| 757102 | 2000 GP_{188} | — | February 8, 2007 | Kitt Peak | Spacewatch | · | 800 m | MPC · JPL |
| 757103 | 2000 GW_{188} | — | November 7, 2015 | Mount Lemmon | Mount Lemmon Survey | JUN | 820 m | MPC · JPL |
| 757104 | 2000 JY_{95} | — | August 21, 2015 | Haleakala | Pan-STARRS 1 | · | 1.7 km | MPC · JPL |
| 757105 | 2000 JG_{96} | — | May 3, 2013 | Mount Lemmon | Mount Lemmon Survey | · | 1.1 km | MPC · JPL |
| 757106 | 2000 KW_{36} | — | May 28, 2000 | Socorro | LINEAR | · | 2.5 km | MPC · JPL |
| 757107 | 2000 KX_{49} | — | May 30, 2000 | Kitt Peak | Spacewatch | · | 2.5 km | MPC · JPL |
| 757108 | 2000 KT_{81} | — | December 4, 2015 | Haleakala | Pan-STARRS 1 | JUN | 700 m | MPC · JPL |
| 757109 Donaldmoffatt | 2000 KB_{84} | Donaldmoffatt | May 24, 2000 | Mauna Kea | C. Veillet, D. D. Balam | · | 1.4 km | MPC · JPL |
| 757110 | 2000 NA_{30} | — | January 26, 2017 | Haleakala | Pan-STARRS 1 | · | 1.3 km | MPC · JPL |
| 757111 | 2000 QM_{109} | — | August 31, 2000 | Kitt Peak | Spacewatch | · | 1.2 km | MPC · JPL |
| 757112 | 2000 QE_{148} | — | August 31, 2000 | Kitt Peak | Spacewatch | · | 1.1 km | MPC · JPL |
| 757113 | 2000 QQ_{241} | — | August 26, 2000 | Cerro Tololo | Deep Ecliptic Survey | BRA | 1.1 km | MPC · JPL |
| 757114 | 2000 QT_{245} | — | August 30, 2000 | Kitt Peak | Spacewatch | · | 2.5 km | MPC · JPL |
| 757115 | 2000 QG_{256} | — | December 21, 2014 | Haleakala | Pan-STARRS 1 | · | 460 m | MPC · JPL |
| 757116 | 2000 QN_{257} | — | January 23, 2006 | Kitt Peak | Spacewatch | MAS | 500 m | MPC · JPL |
| 757117 | 2000 QH_{259} | — | March 27, 2017 | Haleakala | Pan-STARRS 1 | · | 1.6 km | MPC · JPL |
| 757118 | 2000 QO_{259} | — | March 22, 2015 | Haleakala | Pan-STARRS 1 | · | 2.1 km | MPC · JPL |
| 757119 | 2000 QE_{260} | — | September 9, 2015 | Haleakala | Pan-STARRS 1 | KOR | 1.0 km | MPC · JPL |
| 757120 | 2000 QP_{260} | — | August 23, 2014 | Haleakala | Pan-STARRS 1 | · | 1.2 km | MPC · JPL |
| 757121 | 2000 QF_{261} | — | September 16, 2009 | Kitt Peak | Spacewatch | 3:2 | 4.2 km | MPC · JPL |
| 757122 | 2000 QK_{261} | — | August 20, 2000 | Kitt Peak | Spacewatch | THM | 1.9 km | MPC · JPL |
| 757123 | 2000 RP_{57} | — | September 7, 2000 | Kitt Peak | Spacewatch | TIN | 740 m | MPC · JPL |
| 757124 | 2000 RZ_{108} | — | April 4, 2008 | Kitt Peak | Spacewatch | · | 1.3 km | MPC · JPL |
| 757125 | 2000 RD_{110} | — | October 13, 2007 | Catalina | CSS | · | 550 m | MPC · JPL |
| 757126 | 2000 RG_{113} | — | September 5, 2000 | Apache Point | SDSS | · | 1.4 km | MPC · JPL |
| 757127 | 2000 SR_{380} | — | November 26, 2013 | Mount Lemmon | Mount Lemmon Survey | · | 1.1 km | MPC · JPL |
| 757128 | 2000 ST_{384} | — | November 19, 2007 | Kitt Peak | Spacewatch | · | 510 m | MPC · JPL |
| 757129 | 2000 SD_{386} | — | December 3, 2015 | Mount Lemmon | Mount Lemmon Survey | AGN | 930 m | MPC · JPL |
| 757130 | 2000 SN_{386} | — | October 2, 2014 | Haleakala | Pan-STARRS 1 | · | 1.8 km | MPC · JPL |
| 757131 | 2000 SW_{386} | — | September 22, 2000 | Kitt Peak | Spacewatch | · | 2.5 km | MPC · JPL |
| 757132 | 2000 TQ_{76} | — | February 13, 2008 | Mount Lemmon | Mount Lemmon Survey | · | 2.2 km | MPC · JPL |
| 757133 | 2000 TT_{77} | — | September 30, 2006 | Kitt Peak | Spacewatch | ELF | 2.7 km | MPC · JPL |
| 757134 | 2000 TV_{77} | — | February 28, 2012 | Haleakala | Pan-STARRS 1 | HOF | 1.9 km | MPC · JPL |
| 757135 | 2000 TE_{81} | — | October 3, 2014 | Kitt Peak | Spacewatch | PAD | 1.2 km | MPC · JPL |
| 757136 | 2000 TD_{82} | — | February 23, 2012 | Mount Lemmon | Mount Lemmon Survey | · | 1.4 km | MPC · JPL |
| 757137 | 2000 UB_{31} | — | October 29, 2000 | Kitt Peak | Spacewatch | · | 820 m | MPC · JPL |
| 757138 | 2000 US_{31} | — | October 29, 2000 | Kitt Peak | Spacewatch | · | 1.6 km | MPC · JPL |
| 757139 | 2000 WY_{11} | — | November 20, 2000 | Kitt Peak | Spacewatch | · | 1.2 km | MPC · JPL |
| 757140 | 2000 WU_{201} | — | November 4, 2007 | Kitt Peak | Spacewatch | · | 380 m | MPC · JPL |
| 757141 | 2000 WG_{205} | — | November 20, 2000 | Kitt Peak | Spacewatch | · | 1.9 km | MPC · JPL |
| 757142 | 2000 XH_{56} | — | May 20, 2015 | Cerro Tololo-DECam | DECam | · | 980 m | MPC · JPL |
| 757143 | 2000 YE_{146} | — | December 21, 2000 | Kitt Peak | Spacewatch | · | 700 m | MPC · JPL |
| 757144 | 2001 AS_{19} | — | January 4, 2001 | Bohyunsan | Bohyunsan Optical Astronomy Observatory | · | 1.3 km | MPC · JPL |
| 757145 | 2001 DD_{117} | — | February 2, 2008 | Kitt Peak | Spacewatch | · | 690 m | MPC · JPL |
| 757146 | 2001 DP_{117} | — | November 3, 2010 | Mount Lemmon | Mount Lemmon Survey | V | 510 m | MPC · JPL |
| 757147 | 2001 FD_{205} | — | March 21, 2001 | Kitt Peak | SKADS | · | 670 m | MPC · JPL |
| 757148 | 2001 FH_{206} | — | March 26, 2001 | Kitt Peak | Deep Ecliptic Survey | · | 1.5 km | MPC · JPL |
| 757149 | 2001 FB_{207} | — | March 21, 2001 | Kitt Peak | SKADS | KOR | 890 m | MPC · JPL |
| 757150 | 2001 FS_{212} | — | March 21, 2001 | Kitt Peak | SKADS | · | 560 m | MPC · JPL |
| 757151 | 2001 FR_{214} | — | September 29, 2003 | Kitt Peak | Spacewatch | · | 1.1 km | MPC · JPL |
| 757152 | 2001 FO_{220} | — | October 1, 2008 | Mount Lemmon | Mount Lemmon Survey | · | 1.3 km | MPC · JPL |
| 757153 | 2001 FJ_{245} | — | March 26, 2001 | Kitt Peak | Spacewatch | LIX | 3.2 km | MPC · JPL |
| 757154 | 2001 FY_{245} | — | February 7, 2011 | Mount Lemmon | Mount Lemmon Survey | · | 1.8 km | MPC · JPL |
| 757155 | 2001 GB_{12} | — | March 26, 2008 | Mount Lemmon | Mount Lemmon Survey | · | 670 m | MPC · JPL |
| 757156 | 2001 HC_{19} | — | April 24, 2001 | Kitt Peak | Spacewatch | · | 890 m | MPC · JPL |
| 757157 | 2001 HR_{69} | — | April 27, 2001 | Kitt Peak | Spacewatch | · | 620 m | MPC · JPL |
| 757158 | 2001 HS_{69} | — | February 11, 2011 | Mount Lemmon | Mount Lemmon Survey | · | 520 m | MPC · JPL |
| 757159 | 2001 HW_{69} | — | September 20, 2014 | Haleakala | Pan-STARRS 1 | · | 2.0 km | MPC · JPL |
| 757160 | 2001 KG_{81} | — | October 15, 2007 | Kitt Peak | Spacewatch | (5) | 960 m | MPC · JPL |
| 757161 | 2001 KD_{82} | — | August 29, 2006 | Kitt Peak | Spacewatch | · | 1.3 km | MPC · JPL |
| 757162 | 2001 KT_{82} | — | August 12, 2013 | Haleakala | Pan-STARRS 1 | · | 1.9 km | MPC · JPL |
| 757163 | 2001 KN_{85} | — | November 22, 2015 | Mount Lemmon | Mount Lemmon Survey | · | 910 m | MPC · JPL |
| 757164 | 2001 KV_{85} | — | May 24, 2001 | Cerro Tololo | Deep Ecliptic Survey | · | 1.3 km | MPC · JPL |
| 757165 | 2001 KW_{85} | — | September 7, 2008 | Mount Lemmon | Mount Lemmon Survey | · | 1.7 km | MPC · JPL |
| 757166 | 2001 KV_{86} | — | September 13, 2013 | Mount Lemmon | Mount Lemmon Survey | NYS | 770 m | MPC · JPL |
| 757167 | 2001 KQ_{87} | — | October 19, 2006 | Mount Lemmon | Mount Lemmon Survey | · | 1.4 km | MPC · JPL |
| 757168 | 2001 KX_{87} | — | January 17, 2013 | Haleakala | Pan-STARRS 1 | · | 960 m | MPC · JPL |
| 757169 | 2001 LS_{20} | — | July 26, 2001 | Kitt Peak | Spacewatch | T_{j} (2.9) | 2.2 km | MPC · JPL |
| 757170 | 2001 OK_{115} | — | October 26, 2011 | Haleakala | Pan-STARRS 1 | NEM | 1.9 km | MPC · JPL |
| 757171 | 2001 QE_{170} | — | August 23, 2001 | Socorro | LINEAR | · | 3.2 km | MPC · JPL |
| 757172 | 2001 QG_{173} | — | August 24, 2001 | Anderson Mesa | LONEOS | · | 830 m | MPC · JPL |
| 757173 | 2001 QG_{236} | — | August 24, 2001 | Socorro | LINEAR | · | 960 m | MPC · JPL |
| 757174 | 2001 QS_{302} | — | August 19, 2001 | Cerro Tololo | Deep Ecliptic Survey | · | 1.6 km | MPC · JPL |
| 757175 | 2001 QE_{307} | — | August 19, 2001 | Cerro Tololo | Deep Ecliptic Survey | MAS | 560 m | MPC · JPL |
| 757176 | 2001 QZ_{310} | — | August 19, 2001 | Cerro Tololo | Deep Ecliptic Survey | · | 1.9 km | MPC · JPL |
| 757177 | 2001 QE_{318} | — | August 20, 2001 | Cerro Tololo | Deep Ecliptic Survey | · | 1.4 km | MPC · JPL |
| 757178 | 2001 QS_{336} | — | August 3, 2014 | Haleakala | Pan-STARRS 1 | · | 1.3 km | MPC · JPL |
| 757179 | 2001 QQ_{338} | — | August 21, 2001 | Kitt Peak | Spacewatch | · | 1.1 km | MPC · JPL |
| 757180 | 2001 RW_{39} | — | September 10, 2001 | Socorro | LINEAR | THB | 2.4 km | MPC · JPL |
| 757181 | 2001 RN_{157} | — | March 6, 2013 | Haleakala | Pan-STARRS 1 | · | 1.6 km | MPC · JPL |
| 757182 | 2001 RF_{158} | — | September 12, 2001 | Kitt Peak | Deep Ecliptic Survey | MAS | 530 m | MPC · JPL |
| 757183 | 2001 SE_{205} | — | September 19, 2001 | Socorro | LINEAR | · | 2.3 km | MPC · JPL |
| 757184 | 2001 SJ_{225} | — | September 18, 2001 | Kitt Peak | Spacewatch | LIX | 2.9 km | MPC · JPL |
| 757185 | 2001 SW_{274} | — | September 20, 2001 | Kitt Peak | Spacewatch | · | 1.3 km | MPC · JPL |
| 757186 | 2001 SN_{357} | — | September 18, 2001 | Kitt Peak | Spacewatch | · | 1 km | MPC · JPL |
| 757187 | 2001 SS_{358} | — | March 25, 2007 | Mount Lemmon | Mount Lemmon Survey | · | 580 m | MPC · JPL |
| 757188 | 2001 SP_{359} | — | January 19, 2015 | Haleakala | Pan-STARRS 1 | · | 2.4 km | MPC · JPL |
| 757189 | 2001 SR_{361} | — | March 3, 2016 | Mount Lemmon | Mount Lemmon Survey | (895) | 2.7 km | MPC · JPL |
| 757190 | 2001 SX_{361} | — | August 28, 2014 | Haleakala | Pan-STARRS 1 | · | 1.5 km | MPC · JPL |
| 757191 | 2001 SH_{363} | — | January 16, 2009 | Mount Lemmon | Mount Lemmon Survey | · | 2.5 km | MPC · JPL |
| 757192 | 2001 SN_{363} | — | September 17, 2010 | Mount Lemmon | Mount Lemmon Survey | · | 1.0 km | MPC · JPL |
| 757193 | 2001 SW_{363} | — | October 10, 2007 | Kitt Peak | Spacewatch | · | 2.4 km | MPC · JPL |
| 757194 | 2001 SB_{364} | — | December 29, 2013 | Haleakala | Pan-STARRS 1 | · | 2.0 km | MPC · JPL |
| 757195 | 2001 TX_{22} | — | October 13, 2001 | Socorro | LINEAR | · | 2.5 km | MPC · JPL |
| 757196 | 2001 TY_{156} | — | October 14, 2001 | Kitt Peak | Spacewatch | URS | 2.4 km | MPC · JPL |
| 757197 | 2001 TK_{267} | — | September 16, 2012 | Kitt Peak | Spacewatch | · | 2.2 km | MPC · JPL |
| 757198 | 2001 TE_{268} | — | January 1, 2014 | Haleakala | Pan-STARRS 1 | · | 960 m | MPC · JPL |
| 757199 | 2001 TZ_{268} | — | January 30, 2009 | Kitt Peak | Spacewatch | · | 2.4 km | MPC · JPL |
| 757200 | 2001 TA_{269} | — | October 14, 2001 | Cima Ekar | ADAS | · | 2.0 km | MPC · JPL |

== 757201–757300 ==
back to top

| Designation | | | Discovery | | | Properties | | Ref |
| Permanent | Provisional | Named after | Date | Site | Discoverer(s) | Category | Diam. | Ref |
|---|---|---|---|---|---|---|---|---|
| 757201 | 2001 TD_{269} | — | October 9, 2001 | Kitt Peak | Spacewatch | · | 1.9 km | MPC · JPL |
| 757202 | 2001 TL_{269} | — | October 14, 2001 | Apache Point | SDSS | · | 1.7 km | MPC · JPL |
| 757203 | 2001 UW_{86} | — | October 18, 2001 | Kitt Peak | Spacewatch | AGN | 820 m | MPC · JPL |
| 757204 | 2001 UW_{200} | — | October 21, 2001 | Socorro | LINEAR | GAL | 1.2 km | MPC · JPL |
| 757205 | 2001 UJ_{235} | — | October 25, 2001 | Apache Point | SDSS | · | 1.4 km | MPC · JPL |
| 757206 | 2001 UN_{235} | — | January 19, 2012 | Haleakala | Pan-STARRS 1 | · | 1.4 km | MPC · JPL |
| 757207 | 2001 UU_{235} | — | October 25, 2001 | Kitt Peak | Spacewatch | · | 1.1 km | MPC · JPL |
| 757208 | 2001 UR_{239} | — | November 30, 2011 | Mount Lemmon | Mount Lemmon Survey | KOR | 1.1 km | MPC · JPL |
| 757209 | 2001 UU_{239} | — | October 25, 2001 | Apache Point | SDSS | · | 1.1 km | MPC · JPL |
| 757210 | 2001 UY_{239} | — | September 14, 2010 | Kitt Peak | Spacewatch | · | 1.2 km | MPC · JPL |
| 757211 | 2001 UM_{240} | — | October 5, 2012 | Mount Lemmon | Mount Lemmon Survey | TIR | 2.0 km | MPC · JPL |
| 757212 | 2001 UR_{240} | — | February 16, 2015 | Haleakala | Pan-STARRS 1 | · | 2.1 km | MPC · JPL |
| 757213 | 2001 UU_{240} | — | September 22, 2012 | Kitt Peak | Spacewatch | · | 2.0 km | MPC · JPL |
| 757214 | 2001 VM_{135} | — | January 23, 2006 | Mount Lemmon | Mount Lemmon Survey | MAS | 500 m | MPC · JPL |
| 757215 | 2001 VG_{136} | — | November 12, 2001 | Apache Point | SDSS | · | 1.1 km | MPC · JPL |
| 757216 | 2001 VT_{136} | — | January 19, 2012 | Haleakala | Pan-STARRS 1 | · | 1.3 km | MPC · JPL |
| 757217 | 2001 VD_{137} | — | August 14, 2012 | Haleakala | Pan-STARRS 1 | · | 790 m | MPC · JPL |
| 757218 | 2001 VN_{137} | — | September 20, 2008 | Kitt Peak | Spacewatch | MAS | 440 m | MPC · JPL |
| 757219 | 2001 VR_{138} | — | November 11, 2001 | Apache Point | SDSS | LIX | 2.6 km | MPC · JPL |
| 757220 | 2001 WE_{24} | — | November 17, 2001 | Kitt Peak | Spacewatch | · | 1.4 km | MPC · JPL |
| 757221 | 2001 WM_{30} | — | November 17, 2001 | Socorro | LINEAR | LIX | 2.7 km | MPC · JPL |
| 757222 | 2001 WZ_{105} | — | November 13, 2010 | Mount Lemmon | Mount Lemmon Survey | · | 1.6 km | MPC · JPL |
| 757223 | 2001 WE_{107} | — | March 28, 2015 | Haleakala | Pan-STARRS 1 | · | 2.7 km | MPC · JPL |
| 757224 | 2001 WF_{107} | — | November 13, 2010 | Mount Lemmon | Mount Lemmon Survey | · | 1.5 km | MPC · JPL |
| 757225 | 2001 WH_{107} | — | March 20, 2017 | Haleakala | Pan-STARRS 1 | · | 1.4 km | MPC · JPL |
| 757226 | 2001 WO_{107} | — | November 16, 2001 | Kitt Peak | Spacewatch | · | 690 m | MPC · JPL |
| 757227 | 2001 YN_{12} | — | December 17, 2001 | Socorro | LINEAR | · | 2.1 km | MPC · JPL |
| 757228 | 2001 YH_{13} | — | December 7, 2001 | Kitt Peak | Spacewatch | · | 470 m | MPC · JPL |
| 757229 | 2001 YS_{77} | — | December 18, 2001 | Socorro | LINEAR | · | 1.6 km | MPC · JPL |
| 757230 | 2001 YO_{165} | — | September 22, 2014 | Haleakala | Pan-STARRS 1 | · | 1.3 km | MPC · JPL |
| 757231 | 2002 AN_{16} | — | January 14, 2002 | Socorro | LINEAR | · | 1.5 km | MPC · JPL |
| 757232 | 2002 AS_{33} | — | January 12, 2002 | Kitt Peak | Spacewatch | · | 1.3 km | MPC · JPL |
| 757233 | 2002 AH_{54} | — | January 9, 2002 | Socorro | LINEAR | · | 1.5 km | MPC · JPL |
| 757234 | 2002 AZ_{202} | — | January 14, 2002 | Socorro | LINEAR | · | 1.1 km | MPC · JPL |
| 757235 | 2002 AE_{213} | — | January 19, 2012 | Haleakala | Pan-STARRS 1 | · | 510 m | MPC · JPL |
| 757236 | 2002 AH_{213} | — | May 4, 2014 | Mount Lemmon | Mount Lemmon Survey | · | 2.4 km | MPC · JPL |
| 757237 | 2002 AN_{213} | — | April 11, 2008 | Mount Lemmon | Mount Lemmon Survey | · | 1.4 km | MPC · JPL |
| 757238 | 2002 AW_{214} | — | November 3, 2010 | Mount Lemmon | Mount Lemmon Survey | · | 1.5 km | MPC · JPL |
| 757239 | 2002 AJ_{216} | — | February 28, 2008 | Mount Lemmon | Mount Lemmon Survey | EOS | 1.5 km | MPC · JPL |
| 757240 | 2002 AH_{217} | — | January 13, 2002 | Kitt Peak | Spacewatch | · | 2.3 km | MPC · JPL |
| 757241 | 2002 BV_{33} | — | January 5, 2013 | Mount Lemmon | Mount Lemmon Survey | VER | 1.9 km | MPC · JPL |
| 757242 | 2002 BY_{33} | — | March 28, 2014 | Mount Lemmon | Mount Lemmon Survey | · | 940 m | MPC · JPL |
| 757243 | 2002 BA_{34} | — | January 18, 2002 | Cima Ekar | ADAS | T_{j} (2.8) | 4.6 km | MPC · JPL |
| 757244 | 2002 CK_{182} | — | February 10, 2002 | Socorro | LINEAR | · | 520 m | MPC · JPL |
| 757245 | 2002 CN_{231} | — | February 15, 2002 | Cerro Tololo | Deep Lens Survey | L4 | 7.0 km | MPC · JPL |
| 757246 | 2002 CB_{260} | — | February 7, 2002 | Socorro | LINEAR | T_{j} (2.99) · EUP | 2.9 km | MPC · JPL |
| 757247 | 2002 CK_{320} | — | October 6, 2008 | Mount Lemmon | Mount Lemmon Survey | 3:2 · SHU | 4.1 km | MPC · JPL |
| 757248 | 2002 CG_{322} | — | October 6, 2012 | Haleakala | Pan-STARRS 1 | · | 1.1 km | MPC · JPL |
| 757249 | 2002 CF_{323} | — | October 8, 2008 | Mount Lemmon | Mount Lemmon Survey | · | 920 m | MPC · JPL |
| 757250 | 2002 CL_{323} | — | April 19, 2009 | Mount Lemmon | Mount Lemmon Survey | · | 470 m | MPC · JPL |
| 757251 | 2002 CM_{324} | — | October 23, 2009 | Kitt Peak | Spacewatch | GEF | 940 m | MPC · JPL |
| 757252 | 2002 CO_{325} | — | November 7, 2010 | Mount Lemmon | Mount Lemmon Survey | · | 1.6 km | MPC · JPL |
| 757253 | 2002 CC_{327} | — | November 21, 2017 | Haleakala | Pan-STARRS 1 | · | 500 m | MPC · JPL |
| 757254 | 2002 CG_{327} | — | January 11, 2016 | Haleakala | Pan-STARRS 1 | · | 1.7 km | MPC · JPL |
| 757255 | 2002 CH_{327} | — | August 10, 2007 | Kitt Peak | Spacewatch | NYS | 980 m | MPC · JPL |
| 757256 | 2002 CH_{328} | — | January 26, 2017 | Mount Lemmon | Mount Lemmon Survey | NYS | 910 m | MPC · JPL |
| 757257 | 2002 CN_{328} | — | February 13, 2002 | Kitt Peak | Spacewatch | · | 2.2 km | MPC · JPL |
| 757258 | 2002 CC_{329} | — | February 8, 2002 | Kitt Peak | Deep Ecliptic Survey | · | 2.2 km | MPC · JPL |
| 757259 | 2002 EY_{120} | — | March 11, 2002 | Kitt Peak | Spacewatch | · | 2.4 km | MPC · JPL |
| 757260 | 2002 EM_{167} | — | February 3, 2013 | Haleakala | Pan-STARRS 1 | · | 920 m | MPC · JPL |
| 757261 | 2002 EH_{168} | — | March 5, 2002 | Kitt Peak | Spacewatch | · | 1.4 km | MPC · JPL |
| 757262 | 2002 EM_{171} | — | October 16, 2012 | Mount Lemmon | Mount Lemmon Survey | · | 940 m | MPC · JPL |
| 757263 | 2002 FG_{19} | — | March 18, 2002 | Kitt Peak | Deep Ecliptic Survey | · | 1.1 km | MPC · JPL |
| 757264 | 2002 GJ_{194} | — | April 2, 2009 | Mount Lemmon | Mount Lemmon Survey | · | 740 m | MPC · JPL |
| 757265 | 2002 GO_{195} | — | October 8, 2015 | Haleakala | Pan-STARRS 1 | PHO | 720 m | MPC · JPL |
| 757266 | 2002 GR_{197} | — | February 5, 2016 | Haleakala | Pan-STARRS 1 | EOS | 1.5 km | MPC · JPL |
| 757267 | 2002 GX_{197} | — | April 9, 2002 | Kitt Peak | Spacewatch | · | 590 m | MPC · JPL |
| 757268 | 2002 JJ_{140} | — | May 10, 2002 | Kitt Peak | Spacewatch | MIS | 1.8 km | MPC · JPL |
| 757269 | 2002 JG_{153} | — | January 20, 2015 | Haleakala | Pan-STARRS 1 | · | 460 m | MPC · JPL |
| 757270 | 2002 JW_{153} | — | April 1, 2012 | Mount Lemmon | Mount Lemmon Survey | TEL | 1.1 km | MPC · JPL |
| 757271 | 2002 LO_{66} | — | July 13, 2013 | Haleakala | Pan-STARRS 1 | · | 1.5 km | MPC · JPL |
| 757272 | 2002 NJ_{82} | — | August 26, 2013 | Haleakala | Pan-STARRS 1 | · | 2.2 km | MPC · JPL |
| 757273 | 2002 NA_{84} | — | August 30, 2011 | Piszkés-tető | K. Sárneczky, S. Kürti | EUN | 900 m | MPC · JPL |
| 757274 | 2002 PD_{112} | — | June 18, 2002 | Kitt Peak | Spacewatch | · | 1.1 km | MPC · JPL |
| 757275 | 2002 PC_{121} | — | August 13, 2002 | Anderson Mesa | LONEOS | · | 1.1 km | MPC · JPL |
| 757276 | 2002 PU_{121} | — | August 13, 2002 | Anderson Mesa | LONEOS | · | 1.2 km | MPC · JPL |
| 757277 | 2002 PD_{203} | — | October 1, 2013 | Catalina | CSS | · | 1.7 km | MPC · JPL |
| 757278 | 2002 QP_{24} | — | August 15, 2002 | Anderson Mesa | LONEOS | · | 1.2 km | MPC · JPL |
| 757279 | 2002 QX_{133} | — | August 30, 2002 | Palomar | NEAT | · | 1.4 km | MPC · JPL |
| 757280 | 2002 QZ_{158} | — | February 17, 2004 | Kitt Peak | Spacewatch | MAR | 960 m | MPC · JPL |
| 757281 | 2002 QT_{159} | — | August 3, 2016 | Haleakala | Pan-STARRS 1 | · | 590 m | MPC · JPL |
| 757282 | 2002 QD_{160} | — | November 16, 2006 | Kitt Peak | Spacewatch | MAS | 520 m | MPC · JPL |
| 757283 | 2002 QH_{160} | — | October 2, 2006 | Mount Lemmon | Mount Lemmon Survey | · | 690 m | MPC · JPL |
| 757284 | 2002 RB_{265} | — | August 30, 2002 | Kitt Peak | Spacewatch | · | 650 m | MPC · JPL |
| 757285 | 2002 RA_{292} | — | October 21, 2007 | Kitt Peak | Spacewatch | · | 1.9 km | MPC · JPL |
| 757286 | 2002 RU_{292} | — | February 8, 2011 | Mount Lemmon | Mount Lemmon Survey | NYS | 870 m | MPC · JPL |
| 757287 | 2002 RT_{293} | — | September 9, 2002 | Palomar | NEAT | · | 1.4 km | MPC · JPL |
| 757288 | 2002 RQ_{296} | — | September 29, 2002 | Haleakala | NEAT | · | 2.0 km | MPC · JPL |
| 757289 | 2002 RY_{299} | — | September 3, 2013 | Kitt Peak | Spacewatch | EOS | 1.4 km | MPC · JPL |
| 757290 | 2002 RG_{300} | — | April 28, 2017 | Haleakala | Pan-STARRS 1 | · | 2.3 km | MPC · JPL |
| 757291 | 2002 SV_{75} | — | October 13, 2013 | Kitt Peak | Spacewatch | MAS | 570 m | MPC · JPL |
| 757292 | 2002 TY_{155} | — | October 5, 2002 | Kitt Peak | Spacewatch | · | 920 m | MPC · JPL |
| 757293 | 2002 TB_{183} | — | September 5, 2002 | Anderson Mesa | LONEOS | · | 1.3 km | MPC · JPL |
| 757294 | 2002 TP_{201} | — | October 5, 2002 | Kitt Peak | Spacewatch | · | 760 m | MPC · JPL |
| 757295 | 2002 TD_{247} | — | October 9, 2002 | Kitt Peak | Spacewatch | · | 1.2 km | MPC · JPL |
| 757296 | 2002 TM_{263} | — | October 10, 2002 | Socorro | LINEAR | · | 2.1 km | MPC · JPL |
| 757297 | 2002 TW_{382} | — | October 15, 2002 | Palomar | NEAT | · | 1.7 km | MPC · JPL |
| 757298 | 2002 TQ_{383} | — | October 5, 2002 | Apache Point | SDSS | · | 760 m | MPC · JPL |
| 757299 | 2002 TC_{388} | — | September 10, 2013 | Haleakala | Pan-STARRS 1 | · | 1.6 km | MPC · JPL |
| 757300 | 2002 TN_{390} | — | November 9, 2013 | Kitt Peak | Spacewatch | V | 430 m | MPC · JPL |

== 757301–757400 ==
back to top

| Designation | | | Discovery | | | Properties | | Ref |
| Permanent | Provisional | Named after | Date | Site | Discoverer(s) | Category | Diam. | Ref |
|---|---|---|---|---|---|---|---|---|
| 757301 | 2002 TJ_{392} | — | April 5, 2016 | Haleakala | Pan-STARRS 1 | · | 1.7 km | MPC · JPL |
| 757302 | 2002 TS_{392} | — | May 19, 2012 | Mount Lemmon | Mount Lemmon Survey | · | 1.9 km | MPC · JPL |
| 757303 | 2002 TV_{392} | — | February 22, 2017 | Mount Lemmon | Mount Lemmon Survey | · | 1.2 km | MPC · JPL |
| 757304 | 2002 TF_{394} | — | April 17, 2016 | Haleakala | Pan-STARRS 1 | H | 350 m | MPC · JPL |
| 757305 | 2002 UB_{75} | — | November 1, 2002 | La Palma | A. Fitzsimmons | · | 1.3 km | MPC · JPL |
| 757306 | 2002 UC_{75} | — | November 1, 2002 | La Palma | A. Fitzsimmons | LIX | 2.9 km | MPC · JPL |
| 757307 | 2002 UF_{82} | — | November 7, 2015 | Haleakala | Pan-STARRS 1 | · | 1.1 km | MPC · JPL |
| 757308 | 2002 VM_{2} | — | September 13, 2017 | Haleakala | Pan-STARRS 1 | · | 1.7 km | MPC · JPL |
| 757309 | 2002 VH_{85} | — | November 11, 2002 | Kitt Peak | Spacewatch | EOS | 1.4 km | MPC · JPL |
| 757310 | 2002 VB_{152} | — | September 9, 2015 | Haleakala | Pan-STARRS 1 | · | 1.1 km | MPC · JPL |
| 757311 | 2002 VH_{152} | — | November 7, 2002 | Kitt Peak | Deep Ecliptic Survey | · | 2.1 km | MPC · JPL |
| 757312 | 2002 VJ_{152} | — | August 2, 2016 | Haleakala | Pan-STARRS 1 | NYS | 560 m | MPC · JPL |
| 757313 | 2002 VK_{153} | — | January 26, 2017 | Haleakala | Pan-STARRS 1 | · | 1.3 km | MPC · JPL |
| 757314 | 2002 VD_{154} | — | January 22, 2015 | Haleakala | Pan-STARRS 1 | · | 1.8 km | MPC · JPL |
| 757315 | 2002 WO_{29} | — | November 22, 2002 | Palomar | NEAT | · | 1.2 km | MPC · JPL |
| 757316 | 2002 WR_{30} | — | November 24, 2002 | Palomar | NEAT | · | 1.9 km | MPC · JPL |
| 757317 | 2002 WX_{30} | — | November 7, 2002 | Kitt Peak | Deep Ecliptic Survey | · | 2.3 km | MPC · JPL |
| 757318 | 2002 WY_{32} | — | October 9, 2013 | Mount Lemmon | Mount Lemmon Survey | · | 2.1 km | MPC · JPL |
| 757319 | 2002 XN_{41} | — | December 6, 2002 | Socorro | LINEAR | · | 1.5 km | MPC · JPL |
| 757320 | 2002 XB_{121} | — | December 3, 2002 | Palomar | NEAT | ADE | 1.5 km | MPC · JPL |
| 757321 | 2002 XQ_{122} | — | October 15, 2007 | Kitt Peak | Spacewatch | · | 1.7 km | MPC · JPL |
| 757322 | 2002 XH_{123} | — | October 13, 2015 | Mount Lemmon | Mount Lemmon Survey | · | 1.2 km | MPC · JPL |
| 757323 | 2002 XT_{123} | — | March 19, 2009 | Kitt Peak | Spacewatch | EUN | 870 m | MPC · JPL |
| 757324 | 2003 AC_{79} | — | January 10, 2003 | Kitt Peak | Spacewatch | · | 770 m | MPC · JPL |
| 757325 | 2003 AY_{83} | — | January 4, 2003 | Kitt Peak | Deep Lens Survey | · | 1.9 km | MPC · JPL |
| 757326 | 2003 AD_{95} | — | November 9, 2013 | Kitt Peak | Spacewatch | · | 840 m | MPC · JPL |
| 757327 | 2003 AX_{95} | — | January 6, 2003 | Kitt Peak | Deep Lens Survey | VER | 1.7 km | MPC · JPL |
| 757328 | 2003 AY_{95} | — | January 10, 2003 | Kitt Peak | Spacewatch | · | 2.7 km | MPC · JPL |
| 757329 | 2003 BP_{3} | — | January 24, 2003 | La Silla | A. Boattini, Hainaut, O. | · | 1.3 km | MPC · JPL |
| 757330 | 2003 BQ_{3} | — | January 24, 2003 | La Silla | A. Boattini, Hainaut, O. | HYG | 2.2 km | MPC · JPL |
| 757331 | 2003 BS_{3} | — | January 24, 2003 | La Silla | A. Boattini, Hainaut, O. | · | 780 m | MPC · JPL |
| 757332 | 2003 BV_{4} | — | January 24, 2003 | La Silla | A. Boattini, Hainaut, O. | · | 2.6 km | MPC · JPL |
| 757333 | 2003 BT_{5} | — | January 24, 2003 | La Silla | A. Boattini, Hainaut, O. | · | 1.4 km | MPC · JPL |
| 757334 | 2003 BU_{46} | — | January 27, 2003 | Haleakala | NEAT | · | 1.6 km | MPC · JPL |
| 757335 | 2003 BK_{86} | — | October 11, 2012 | Haleakala | Pan-STARRS 1 | · | 2.2 km | MPC · JPL |
| 757336 | 2003 BG_{97} | — | February 14, 2012 | Haleakala | Pan-STARRS 1 | · | 1.3 km | MPC · JPL |
| 757337 | 2003 BF_{98} | — | February 3, 2012 | Mount Lemmon | Mount Lemmon Survey | · | 1.3 km | MPC · JPL |
| 757338 | 2003 BO_{98} | — | March 9, 2007 | Mount Lemmon | Mount Lemmon Survey | MAS | 520 m | MPC · JPL |
| 757339 | 2003 BS_{98} | — | August 10, 2015 | Haleakala | Pan-STARRS 1 | · | 1.0 km | MPC · JPL |
| 757340 | 2003 BG_{99} | — | September 11, 2010 | Kitt Peak | Spacewatch | · | 1.3 km | MPC · JPL |
| 757341 | 2003 BZ_{99} | — | October 2, 2010 | Kitt Peak | Spacewatch | · | 1.1 km | MPC · JPL |
| 757342 | 2003 BZ_{100} | — | November 7, 2015 | Haleakala | Pan-STARRS 1 | · | 1.5 km | MPC · JPL |
| 757343 | 2003 BH_{101} | — | January 29, 2003 | Apache Point | SDSS | · | 850 m | MPC · JPL |
| 757344 | 2003 BO_{102} | — | February 14, 2009 | Kitt Peak | Spacewatch | · | 2.4 km | MPC · JPL |
| 757345 | 2003 BB_{103} | — | December 18, 2007 | Mount Lemmon | Mount Lemmon Survey | · | 2.3 km | MPC · JPL |
| 757346 | 2003 BG_{103} | — | January 29, 2003 | Apache Point | SDSS | · | 2.4 km | MPC · JPL |
| 757347 | 2003 BM_{103} | — | January 29, 2003 | Apache Point | SDSS | · | 670 m | MPC · JPL |
| 757348 | 2003 CA_{2} | — | January 25, 2014 | Haleakala | Pan-STARRS 1 | · | 2.2 km | MPC · JPL |
| 757349 | 2003 CA_{24} | — | February 4, 2003 | La Silla | Barbieri, C. | KOR | 940 m | MPC · JPL |
| 757350 | 2003 CE_{24} | — | February 4, 2003 | La Silla | Barbieri, C. | · | 2.0 km | MPC · JPL |
| 757351 | 2003 CC_{28} | — | November 12, 2006 | Mount Lemmon | Mount Lemmon Survey | · | 1.4 km | MPC · JPL |
| 757352 | 2003 CG_{28} | — | March 15, 2015 | Haleakala | Pan-STARRS 1 | · | 2.7 km | MPC · JPL |
| 757353 | 2003 FF_{138} | — | September 15, 2006 | Kitt Peak | Spacewatch | · | 2.7 km | MPC · JPL |
| 757354 | 2003 FA_{139} | — | October 11, 2012 | Kitt Peak | Spacewatch | V | 460 m | MPC · JPL |
| 757355 | 2003 FE_{139} | — | March 26, 2007 | Kitt Peak | Spacewatch | · | 990 m | MPC · JPL |
| 757356 | 2003 FS_{140} | — | September 1, 2014 | Mount Lemmon | Mount Lemmon Survey | KOR | 1.1 km | MPC · JPL |
| 757357 | 2003 FK_{141} | — | March 24, 2003 | Kitt Peak | Spacewatch | · | 970 m | MPC · JPL |
| 757358 | 2003 FW_{141} | — | March 31, 2003 | Apache Point | SDSS | · | 1.5 km | MPC · JPL |
| 757359 | 2003 GG_{60} | — | July 1, 2013 | Haleakala | Pan-STARRS 1 | · | 1.4 km | MPC · JPL |
| 757360 | 2003 GZ_{60} | — | March 24, 2014 | Haleakala | Pan-STARRS 1 | · | 930 m | MPC · JPL |
| 757361 | 2003 GB_{63} | — | August 9, 2015 | Haleakala | Pan-STARRS 1 | PHO | 780 m | MPC · JPL |
| 757362 | 2003 GN_{64} | — | April 4, 2013 | Haleakala | Pan-STARRS 1 | · | 600 m | MPC · JPL |
| 757363 | 2003 GX_{64} | — | August 18, 2015 | Kitt Peak | Spacewatch | NYS | 800 m | MPC · JPL |
| 757364 | 2003 GS_{65} | — | July 25, 2017 | Haleakala | Pan-STARRS 1 | · | 2.3 km | MPC · JPL |
| 757365 | 2003 GH_{66} | — | April 9, 2003 | Kitt Peak | Spacewatch | · | 2.5 km | MPC · JPL |
| 757366 | 2003 HB_{3} | — | April 24, 2003 | Kitt Peak | Spacewatch | · | 670 m | MPC · JPL |
| 757367 | 2003 HT_{58} | — | April 26, 2003 | Apache Point | SDSS | · | 610 m | MPC · JPL |
| 757368 | 2003 HS_{61} | — | March 14, 2012 | Mount Lemmon | Mount Lemmon Survey | DOR | 1.9 km | MPC · JPL |
| 757369 | 2003 HM_{62} | — | January 1, 2014 | Haleakala | Pan-STARRS 1 | PHO | 800 m | MPC · JPL |
| 757370 | 2003 HM_{63} | — | January 26, 2012 | Mount Lemmon | Mount Lemmon Survey | · | 1.5 km | MPC · JPL |
| 757371 | 2003 HR_{63} | — | October 18, 2012 | Haleakala | Pan-STARRS 1 | NYS | 1.1 km | MPC · JPL |
| 757372 | 2003 HV_{63} | — | April 25, 2003 | Kitt Peak | Spacewatch | · | 1.1 km | MPC · JPL |
| 757373 | 2003 HX_{63} | — | October 28, 2005 | Kitt Peak | Spacewatch | · | 1.7 km | MPC · JPL |
| 757374 | 2003 HD_{64} | — | September 12, 2016 | Mount Lemmon | Mount Lemmon Survey | · | 980 m | MPC · JPL |
| 757375 | 2003 HT_{65} | — | April 26, 2003 | Kitt Peak | Spacewatch | · | 610 m | MPC · JPL |
| 757376 | 2003 JT_{19} | — | October 23, 2008 | Kitt Peak | Spacewatch | PHO | 940 m | MPC · JPL |
| 757377 | 2003 JB_{20} | — | March 7, 2017 | Haleakala | Pan-STARRS 1 | · | 1.6 km | MPC · JPL |
| 757378 | 2003 JL_{20} | — | January 15, 2018 | Haleakala | Pan-STARRS 1 | · | 1.0 km | MPC · JPL |
| 757379 | 2003 JU_{20} | — | April 27, 2009 | Mount Lemmon | Mount Lemmon Survey | · | 2.8 km | MPC · JPL |
| 757380 | 2003 KV_{10} | — | May 1, 2003 | Kitt Peak | Spacewatch | · | 1.0 km | MPC · JPL |
| 757381 | 2003 KW_{21} | — | May 13, 2015 | Mount Lemmon | Mount Lemmon Survey | · | 2.3 km | MPC · JPL |
| 757382 | 2003 KD_{32} | — | February 12, 2018 | Haleakala | Pan-STARRS 1 | · | 1.1 km | MPC · JPL |
| 757383 | 2003 KA_{39} | — | October 29, 2014 | Haleakala | Pan-STARRS 1 | · | 1.6 km | MPC · JPL |
| 757384 | 2003 LR_{10} | — | January 12, 2016 | Haleakala | Pan-STARRS 1 | · | 1.8 km | MPC · JPL |
| 757385 | 2003 LU_{11} | — | April 5, 2014 | Haleakala | Pan-STARRS 1 | PHO | 630 m | MPC · JPL |
| 757386 | 2003 QL_{83} | — | August 24, 2003 | Cerro Tololo | Deep Ecliptic Survey | · | 1.3 km | MPC · JPL |
| 757387 | 2003 QV_{122} | — | April 15, 2016 | Haleakala | Pan-STARRS 1 | · | 1.4 km | MPC · JPL |
| 757388 | 2003 QW_{124} | — | September 19, 2007 | Kitt Peak | Spacewatch | · | 1.0 km | MPC · JPL |
| 757389 | 2003 QL_{125} | — | August 23, 2003 | Cerro Tololo | Deep Ecliptic Survey | · | 770 m | MPC · JPL |
| 757390 | 2003 QD_{126} | — | August 18, 2009 | Kitt Peak | Spacewatch | · | 2.8 km | MPC · JPL |
| 757391 | 2003 SJ_{8} | — | September 16, 2003 | Kitt Peak | Spacewatch | · | 530 m | MPC · JPL |
| 757392 | 2003 SP_{8} | — | September 16, 2003 | Kitt Peak | Spacewatch | · | 790 m | MPC · JPL |
| 757393 | 2003 ST_{102} | — | September 20, 2003 | Socorro | LINEAR | (5) | 1.0 km | MPC · JPL |
| 757394 | 2003 SN_{239} | — | September 18, 2003 | Kitt Peak | Spacewatch | · | 1.2 km | MPC · JPL |
| 757395 | 2003 SL_{265} | — | September 29, 2003 | Kitt Peak | Spacewatch | · | 1.5 km | MPC · JPL |
| 757396 | 2003 SH_{323} | — | September 16, 2003 | Kitt Peak | Spacewatch | · | 570 m | MPC · JPL |
| 757397 | 2003 SY_{333} | — | September 18, 2003 | Kitt Peak | Spacewatch | · | 830 m | MPC · JPL |
| 757398 | 2003 SJ_{337} | — | September 28, 2003 | Apache Point | SDSS | · | 900 m | MPC · JPL |
| 757399 | 2003 SJ_{343} | — | August 26, 2003 | Cerro Tololo | Deep Ecliptic Survey | (5) | 790 m | MPC · JPL |
| 757400 | 2003 SP_{357} | — | September 20, 2003 | Kitt Peak | Spacewatch | · | 890 m | MPC · JPL |

== 757401–757500 ==
back to top

| Designation | | | Discovery | | | Properties | | Ref |
| Permanent | Provisional | Named after | Date | Site | Discoverer(s) | Category | Diam. | Ref |
|---|---|---|---|---|---|---|---|---|
| 757401 | 2003 SG_{364} | — | September 26, 2003 | Apache Point | SDSS | ARM | 2.4 km | MPC · JPL |
| 757402 | 2003 SH_{364} | — | September 16, 2003 | Kitt Peak | Spacewatch | · | 1.2 km | MPC · JPL |
| 757403 | 2003 SH_{365} | — | September 17, 2003 | Kitt Peak | Spacewatch | · | 1.2 km | MPC · JPL |
| 757404 | 2003 SM_{372} | — | September 29, 2003 | Kitt Peak | Spacewatch | · | 2.1 km | MPC · JPL |
| 757405 | 2003 SQ_{374} | — | September 28, 2003 | Kitt Peak | Spacewatch | · | 480 m | MPC · JPL |
| 757406 | 2003 SB_{378} | — | September 26, 2003 | Apache Point | SDSS | · | 1.6 km | MPC · JPL |
| 757407 | 2003 SW_{379} | — | September 29, 2003 | Kitt Peak | Spacewatch | · | 2.0 km | MPC · JPL |
| 757408 | 2003 SN_{380} | — | September 26, 2003 | Apache Point | SDSS | · | 1.5 km | MPC · JPL |
| 757409 | 2003 SC_{383} | — | September 26, 2003 | Apache Point | SDSS | · | 1.5 km | MPC · JPL |
| 757410 | 2003 SX_{395} | — | October 20, 2003 | Kitt Peak | Spacewatch | · | 450 m | MPC · JPL |
| 757411 | 2003 SQ_{399} | — | September 26, 2003 | Apache Point | SDSS | · | 500 m | MPC · JPL |
| 757412 | 2003 SC_{400} | — | September 26, 2003 | Apache Point | SDSS | EOS | 1.4 km | MPC · JPL |
| 757413 | 2003 SH_{404} | — | September 27, 2003 | Apache Point | SDSS | V | 390 m | MPC · JPL |
| 757414 | 2003 SK_{405} | — | September 27, 2003 | Apache Point | SDSS | · | 530 m | MPC · JPL |
| 757415 | 2003 SX_{413} | — | September 28, 2003 | Apache Point | SDSS | · | 570 m | MPC · JPL |
| 757416 | 2003 SW_{418} | — | September 28, 2003 | Apache Point | SDSS | (5) | 910 m | MPC · JPL |
| 757417 | 2003 SE_{419} | — | September 28, 2003 | Apache Point | SDSS | EOS | 1.4 km | MPC · JPL |
| 757418 | 2003 ST_{428} | — | September 18, 2003 | Kitt Peak | Spacewatch | EUN | 840 m | MPC · JPL |
| 757419 | 2003 SO_{437} | — | September 21, 2003 | Kitt Peak | Spacewatch | · | 910 m | MPC · JPL |
| 757420 | 2003 SR_{437} | — | September 16, 2003 | Kitt Peak | Spacewatch | · | 730 m | MPC · JPL |
| 757421 | 2003 SU_{440} | — | January 7, 2014 | Mount Lemmon | Mount Lemmon Survey | GEF | 930 m | MPC · JPL |
| 757422 | 2003 SG_{441} | — | October 10, 2012 | Mount Lemmon | Mount Lemmon Survey | · | 1.4 km | MPC · JPL |
| 757423 | 2003 SJ_{446} | — | September 2, 2010 | Mount Lemmon | Mount Lemmon Survey | · | 480 m | MPC · JPL |
| 757424 | 2003 SE_{449} | — | October 2, 2014 | Haleakala | Pan-STARRS 1 | H | 490 m | MPC · JPL |
| 757425 | 2003 SP_{451} | — | April 1, 2014 | Mount Lemmon | Mount Lemmon Survey | · | 910 m | MPC · JPL |
| 757426 | 2003 SX_{451} | — | September 22, 2003 | Kitt Peak | Spacewatch | EUN | 810 m | MPC · JPL |
| 757427 | 2003 SW_{452} | — | September 20, 2014 | Haleakala | Pan-STARRS 1 | EOS | 1.3 km | MPC · JPL |
| 757428 | 2003 SM_{454} | — | July 18, 2013 | Haleakala | Pan-STARRS 1 | · | 1.8 km | MPC · JPL |
| 757429 | 2003 SS_{456} | — | August 8, 2013 | Kitt Peak | Spacewatch | EOS | 1.2 km | MPC · JPL |
| 757430 | 2003 SH_{458} | — | July 14, 2013 | Haleakala | Pan-STARRS 1 | · | 1.5 km | MPC · JPL |
| 757431 | 2003 SM_{458} | — | October 11, 2007 | Kitt Peak | Spacewatch | · | 910 m | MPC · JPL |
| 757432 | 2003 ST_{458} | — | April 27, 2012 | Haleakala | Pan-STARRS 1 | · | 1.9 km | MPC · JPL |
| 757433 | 2003 SK_{459} | — | September 20, 2003 | Kitt Peak | Spacewatch | (5) | 950 m | MPC · JPL |
| 757434 | 2003 SA_{461} | — | September 29, 2003 | Kitt Peak | Spacewatch | · | 1.3 km | MPC · JPL |
| 757435 | 2003 SH_{461} | — | July 15, 2013 | Haleakala | Pan-STARRS 1 | · | 1.5 km | MPC · JPL |
| 757436 | 2003 SR_{461} | — | June 27, 2015 | Haleakala | Pan-STARRS 2 | · | 930 m | MPC · JPL |
| 757437 | 2003 SW_{461} | — | July 19, 2015 | Haleakala | Pan-STARRS 1 | · | 800 m | MPC · JPL |
| 757438 | 2003 SO_{462} | — | September 30, 2003 | Kitt Peak | Spacewatch | EOS | 1.2 km | MPC · JPL |
| 757439 | 2003 SO_{463} | — | September 29, 2003 | Kitt Peak | Spacewatch | · | 1.2 km | MPC · JPL |
| 757440 | 2003 SR_{463} | — | September 21, 2003 | Kitt Peak | Spacewatch | · | 1.1 km | MPC · JPL |
| 757441 | 2003 SP_{470} | — | September 27, 2003 | Apache Point | SDSS | EUN | 1.0 km | MPC · JPL |
| 757442 | 2003 SR_{472} | — | September 22, 2003 | Kitt Peak | Spacewatch | EOS | 1.4 km | MPC · JPL |
| 757443 | 2003 SF_{475} | — | September 29, 2003 | Kitt Peak | Spacewatch | · | 1.0 km | MPC · JPL |
| 757444 | 2003 SB_{478} | — | September 22, 2003 | Kitt Peak | Spacewatch | · | 1.3 km | MPC · JPL |
| 757445 | 2003 TH_{22} | — | October 1, 2003 | Kitt Peak | Spacewatch | · | 650 m | MPC · JPL |
| 757446 | 2003 TP_{25} | — | October 1, 2003 | Kitt Peak | Spacewatch | (5) | 840 m | MPC · JPL |
| 757447 | 2003 TG_{27} | — | October 1, 2003 | Kitt Peak | Spacewatch | EOS | 1.4 km | MPC · JPL |
| 757448 | 2003 TC_{28} | — | October 1, 2003 | Kitt Peak | Spacewatch | · | 1.4 km | MPC · JPL |
| 757449 | 2003 TB_{31} | — | October 1, 2003 | Kitt Peak | Spacewatch | · | 910 m | MPC · JPL |
| 757450 | 2003 TK_{32} | — | October 1, 2003 | Kitt Peak | Spacewatch | 3:2 | 4.1 km | MPC · JPL |
| 757451 | 2003 TK_{34} | — | October 1, 2003 | Kitt Peak | Spacewatch | · | 1.0 km | MPC · JPL |
| 757452 | 2003 TW_{65} | — | October 5, 2003 | Kitt Peak | Spacewatch | · | 1.1 km | MPC · JPL |
| 757453 | 2003 UD_{21} | — | October 5, 2003 | Socorro | LINEAR | · | 1.1 km | MPC · JPL |
| 757454 | 2003 US_{25} | — | September 28, 2003 | Kitt Peak | Spacewatch | · | 1.2 km | MPC · JPL |
| 757455 | 2003 UA_{84} | — | October 18, 2003 | Kitt Peak | Spacewatch | · | 1.6 km | MPC · JPL |
| 757456 | 2003 UD_{108} | — | October 19, 2003 | Kitt Peak | Spacewatch | MAS | 510 m | MPC · JPL |
| 757457 | 2003 UV_{262} | — | September 22, 2003 | Kitt Peak | Spacewatch | · | 1.8 km | MPC · JPL |
| 757458 | 2003 UL_{287} | — | October 23, 2003 | Kitt Peak | Spacewatch | (5) | 700 m | MPC · JPL |
| 757459 | 2003 UB_{288} | — | October 24, 2003 | Socorro | LINEAR | · | 1.2 km | MPC · JPL |
| 757460 | 2003 UP_{292} | — | October 23, 2003 | Kitt Peak | Deep Ecliptic Survey | twotino | 132 km | MPC · JPL |
| 757461 | 2003 UK_{300} | — | October 16, 2003 | Kitt Peak | Spacewatch | · | 1.0 km | MPC · JPL |
| 757462 | 2003 UH_{302} | — | October 17, 2003 | Kitt Peak | Spacewatch | · | 940 m | MPC · JPL |
| 757463 | 2003 UY_{302} | — | October 17, 2003 | Kitt Peak | Spacewatch | (5) | 950 m | MPC · JPL |
| 757464 | 2003 UF_{310} | — | October 19, 2003 | Anderson Mesa | LONEOS | · | 880 m | MPC · JPL |
| 757465 | 2003 US_{319} | — | October 20, 2003 | Kitt Peak | Spacewatch | · | 960 m | MPC · JPL |
| 757466 | 2003 UO_{337} | — | September 27, 2003 | Kitt Peak | Spacewatch | MAS | 550 m | MPC · JPL |
| 757467 | 2003 UL_{338} | — | September 17, 2003 | Kitt Peak | Spacewatch | · | 820 m | MPC · JPL |
| 757468 | 2003 UK_{356} | — | October 19, 2003 | Kitt Peak | Spacewatch | DOR | 1.8 km | MPC · JPL |
| 757469 | 2003 UK_{358} | — | October 15, 1995 | Kitt Peak | Spacewatch | 3:2 | 3.6 km | MPC · JPL |
| 757470 | 2003 UV_{359} | — | October 19, 2003 | Kitt Peak | Spacewatch | · | 1.7 km | MPC · JPL |
| 757471 | 2003 UE_{372} | — | October 22, 2003 | Apache Point | SDSS | EOS | 1.4 km | MPC · JPL |
| 757472 | 2003 UJ_{383} | — | October 22, 2003 | Apache Point | SDSS | V | 360 m | MPC · JPL |
| 757473 | 2003 UL_{385} | — | October 22, 2003 | Apache Point | SDSS | · | 700 m | MPC · JPL |
| 757474 | 2003 UR_{387} | — | October 22, 2003 | Apache Point | SDSS | · | 500 m | MPC · JPL |
| 757475 | 2003 UQ_{393} | — | October 22, 2003 | Apache Point | SDSS | · | 1.7 km | MPC · JPL |
| 757476 | 2003 UF_{394} | — | October 22, 2003 | Apache Point | SDSS | TEL | 1.0 km | MPC · JPL |
| 757477 | 2003 UC_{395} | — | October 22, 2003 | Apache Point | SDSS | EOS | 1.4 km | MPC · JPL |
| 757478 | 2003 UH_{395} | — | October 22, 2003 | Apache Point | SDSS | · | 1.3 km | MPC · JPL |
| 757479 | 2003 UA_{397} | — | October 22, 2003 | Apache Point | SDSS | EUN | 910 m | MPC · JPL |
| 757480 | 2003 UX_{397} | — | October 22, 2003 | Apache Point | SDSS | EUN | 940 m | MPC · JPL |
| 757481 | 2003 UT_{398} | — | October 22, 2003 | Apache Point | SDSS | · | 1.9 km | MPC · JPL |
| 757482 | 2003 UO_{405} | — | October 23, 2003 | Apache Point | SDSS | KOR | 1.0 km | MPC · JPL |
| 757483 | 2003 US_{408} | — | October 23, 2003 | Apache Point | SDSS | V | 410 m | MPC · JPL |
| 757484 | 2003 UJ_{410} | — | October 23, 2003 | Apache Point | SDSS | · | 1.8 km | MPC · JPL |
| 757485 | 2003 UE_{412} | — | October 23, 2003 | Apache Point | SDSS | · | 1.1 km | MPC · JPL |
| 757486 | 2003 UA_{425} | — | September 9, 2007 | Kitt Peak | Spacewatch | · | 960 m | MPC · JPL |
| 757487 | 2003 UQ_{425} | — | October 24, 2003 | Kitt Peak | Spacewatch | V | 370 m | MPC · JPL |
| 757488 | 2003 UJ_{426} | — | January 21, 2012 | Kitt Peak | Spacewatch | NYS | 810 m | MPC · JPL |
| 757489 | 2003 UM_{426} | — | October 24, 2003 | Kitt Peak | Spacewatch | MIS | 1.8 km | MPC · JPL |
| 757490 | 2003 UO_{426} | — | August 30, 2016 | Haleakala | Pan-STARRS 1 | · | 1.3 km | MPC · JPL |
| 757491 | 2003 UC_{427} | — | September 18, 2010 | Mount Lemmon | Mount Lemmon Survey | · | 610 m | MPC · JPL |
| 757492 | 2003 UL_{428} | — | August 27, 2011 | Haleakala | Pan-STARRS 1 | · | 930 m | MPC · JPL |
| 757493 | 2003 UT_{428} | — | October 20, 2003 | Kitt Peak | Spacewatch | · | 1.1 km | MPC · JPL |
| 757494 | 2003 UK_{429} | — | November 26, 2014 | Haleakala | Pan-STARRS 1 | · | 1.8 km | MPC · JPL |
| 757495 | 2003 UF_{434} | — | October 22, 2014 | Mount Lemmon | Mount Lemmon Survey | · | 1.7 km | MPC · JPL |
| 757496 | 2003 UG_{435} | — | April 20, 2012 | Mount Lemmon | Mount Lemmon Survey | · | 2.5 km | MPC · JPL |
| 757497 | 2003 UQ_{435} | — | June 3, 2011 | Mount Lemmon | Mount Lemmon Survey | · | 1.1 km | MPC · JPL |
| 757498 | 2003 UX_{436} | — | November 26, 2014 | Haleakala | Pan-STARRS 1 | EOS | 1.3 km | MPC · JPL |
| 757499 | 2003 UK_{437} | — | February 11, 2016 | Haleakala | Pan-STARRS 1 | · | 1.3 km | MPC · JPL |
| 757500 | 2003 UL_{437} | — | July 14, 2013 | Haleakala | Pan-STARRS 1 | · | 1.5 km | MPC · JPL |

== 757501–757600 ==
back to top

| Designation | | | Discovery | | | Properties | | Ref |
| Permanent | Provisional | Named after | Date | Site | Discoverer(s) | Category | Diam. | Ref |
|---|---|---|---|---|---|---|---|---|
| 757501 | 2003 UM_{437} | — | October 23, 2003 | Kitt Peak | Spacewatch | · | 1.0 km | MPC · JPL |
| 757502 | 2003 UJ_{438} | — | October 17, 2003 | Kitt Peak | Spacewatch | · | 1.9 km | MPC · JPL |
| 757503 | 2003 UT_{438} | — | October 22, 2003 | Kitt Peak | Spacewatch | · | 760 m | MPC · JPL |
| 757504 | 2003 UD_{439} | — | October 1, 2014 | Haleakala | Pan-STARRS 1 | EOS | 1.5 km | MPC · JPL |
| 757505 | 2003 UT_{439} | — | August 17, 2012 | Haleakala | Pan-STARRS 1 | HOF | 1.7 km | MPC · JPL |
| 757506 | 2003 US_{442} | — | February 6, 2016 | Haleakala | Pan-STARRS 1 | · | 1.6 km | MPC · JPL |
| 757507 | 2003 UH_{443} | — | September 20, 2014 | Haleakala | Pan-STARRS 1 | · | 2.2 km | MPC · JPL |
| 757508 | 2003 UM_{443} | — | February 18, 2015 | Haleakala | Pan-STARRS 1 | · | 1.6 km | MPC · JPL |
| 757509 | 2003 UB_{445} | — | October 18, 2003 | Kitt Peak | Spacewatch | (21344) | 1.3 km | MPC · JPL |
| 757510 | 2003 UZ_{450} | — | October 21, 2003 | Kitt Peak | Spacewatch | · | 1.5 km | MPC · JPL |
| 757511 | 2003 VV_{12} | — | November 3, 2003 | Apache Point | SDSS | TIR | 1.9 km | MPC · JPL |
| 757512 | 2003 VB_{13} | — | August 30, 2011 | Piszkéstető | K. Sárneczky | MAR | 770 m | MPC · JPL |
| 757513 | 2003 VM_{13} | — | September 4, 2008 | Kitt Peak | Spacewatch | · | 1.3 km | MPC · JPL |
| 757514 | 2003 VQ_{13} | — | November 15, 2003 | Kitt Peak | Spacewatch | ADE | 1.5 km | MPC · JPL |
| 757515 | 2003 WV_{57} | — | November 18, 2003 | Kitt Peak | Spacewatch | · | 890 m | MPC · JPL |
| 757516 | 2003 WY_{180} | — | November 20, 2003 | Kitt Peak | Deep Ecliptic Survey | NYS | 740 m | MPC · JPL |
| 757517 | 2003 WU_{200} | — | May 7, 2014 | Haleakala | Pan-STARRS 1 | PHO | 820 m | MPC · JPL |
| 757518 | 2003 WQ_{202} | — | November 10, 2013 | Kitt Peak | Spacewatch | · | 450 m | MPC · JPL |
| 757519 | 2003 WJ_{203} | — | July 14, 2013 | Haleakala | Pan-STARRS 1 | · | 580 m | MPC · JPL |
| 757520 | 2003 WW_{206} | — | November 24, 2003 | Kitt Peak | Spacewatch | EOS | 1.8 km | MPC · JPL |
| 757521 | 2003 WM_{207} | — | October 28, 2014 | Kitt Peak | Spacewatch | · | 2.2 km | MPC · JPL |
| 757522 | 2003 WN_{207} | — | May 20, 2015 | Cerro Tololo-DECam | DECam | · | 1.5 km | MPC · JPL |
| 757523 | 2003 WQ_{208} | — | September 29, 2008 | Kitt Peak | Spacewatch | · | 2.1 km | MPC · JPL |
| 757524 | 2003 WF_{209} | — | May 23, 2014 | Haleakala | Pan-STARRS 1 | HNS | 950 m | MPC · JPL |
| 757525 | 2003 WA_{212} | — | April 3, 2016 | Mount Lemmon | Mount Lemmon Survey | EOS | 1.5 km | MPC · JPL |
| 757526 | 2003 WB_{212} | — | October 7, 2008 | Mount Lemmon | Mount Lemmon Survey | · | 2.1 km | MPC · JPL |
| 757527 | 2003 WX_{213} | — | January 14, 2016 | Haleakala | Pan-STARRS 1 | EOS | 1.6 km | MPC · JPL |
| 757528 | 2003 WN_{214} | — | November 19, 2003 | Kitt Peak | Spacewatch | MAS | 540 m | MPC · JPL |
| 757529 | 2003 WS_{215} | — | November 16, 2003 | Kitt Peak | Spacewatch | · | 910 m | MPC · JPL |
| 757530 | 2003 WO_{217} | — | November 20, 2003 | Apache Point | SDSS | PHO | 620 m | MPC · JPL |
| 757531 | 2003 WP_{218} | — | November 20, 2003 | Apache Point | SDSS | EOS | 1.4 km | MPC · JPL |
| 757532 | 2003 XC_{46} | — | August 5, 2018 | Haleakala | Pan-STARRS 1 | · | 1.6 km | MPC · JPL |
| 757533 | 2003 XE_{46} | — | November 29, 2014 | Haleakala | Pan-STARRS 1 | EOS | 1.6 km | MPC · JPL |
| 757534 | 2003 XF_{46} | — | September 13, 2007 | Mount Lemmon | Mount Lemmon Survey | · | 1 km | MPC · JPL |
| 757535 | 2003 XO_{46} | — | December 1, 2003 | Kitt Peak | Spacewatch | · | 1.1 km | MPC · JPL |
| 757536 | 2003 YC_{115} | — | December 14, 2003 | Kitt Peak | Spacewatch | · | 2.1 km | MPC · JPL |
| 757537 | 2003 YB_{186} | — | October 1, 2006 | Kitt Peak | Spacewatch | NYS | 660 m | MPC · JPL |
| 757538 | 2003 YM_{186} | — | November 19, 2008 | Kitt Peak | Spacewatch | · | 1.8 km | MPC · JPL |
| 757539 | 2003 YN_{186} | — | August 15, 2013 | Haleakala | Pan-STARRS 1 | · | 570 m | MPC · JPL |
| 757540 | 2003 YU_{188} | — | March 11, 2008 | Kitt Peak | Spacewatch | · | 720 m | MPC · JPL |
| 757541 | 2003 YX_{188} | — | July 25, 2015 | Haleakala | Pan-STARRS 1 | · | 900 m | MPC · JPL |
| 757542 | 2003 YL_{189} | — | November 26, 2011 | Kitt Peak | Spacewatch | H | 440 m | MPC · JPL |
| 757543 | 2003 YM_{189} | — | August 10, 2015 | Haleakala | Pan-STARRS 1 | · | 1.3 km | MPC · JPL |
| 757544 | 2003 YW_{189} | — | December 27, 2016 | Mount Lemmon | Mount Lemmon Survey | H | 480 m | MPC · JPL |
| 757545 | 2003 YX_{189} | — | August 25, 2014 | Haleakala | Pan-STARRS 1 | MAR | 670 m | MPC · JPL |
| 757546 | 2003 YH_{190} | — | December 22, 2003 | Kitt Peak | Spacewatch | · | 890 m | MPC · JPL |
| 757547 | 2004 AA_{24} | — | January 15, 2004 | Kitt Peak | Spacewatch | EUN | 930 m | MPC · JPL |
| 757548 | 2004 AC_{27} | — | July 14, 2013 | Haleakala | Pan-STARRS 1 | · | 690 m | MPC · JPL |
| 757549 | 2004 AP_{27} | — | January 16, 2013 | Mount Lemmon | Mount Lemmon Survey | · | 1.2 km | MPC · JPL |
| 757550 | 2004 BT_{28} | — | January 18, 2004 | Kitt Peak | Spacewatch | · | 930 m | MPC · JPL |
| 757551 | 2004 BO_{33} | — | December 29, 2003 | Kitt Peak | Spacewatch | · | 1.5 km | MPC · JPL |
| 757552 | 2004 BQ_{73} | — | January 24, 2004 | Socorro | LINEAR | (5) | 1.1 km | MPC · JPL |
| 757553 | 2004 BN_{112} | — | January 27, 2004 | Kitt Peak | Spacewatch | THM | 1.6 km | MPC · JPL |
| 757554 | 2004 BO_{125} | — | January 16, 2004 | Kitt Peak | Spacewatch | · | 670 m | MPC · JPL |
| 757555 | 2004 BB_{127} | — | January 16, 2004 | Kitt Peak | Spacewatch | · | 600 m | MPC · JPL |
| 757556 | 2004 BD_{134} | — | January 18, 2004 | Kitt Peak | Spacewatch | · | 570 m | MPC · JPL |
| 757557 | 2004 BS_{135} | — | January 19, 2004 | Kitt Peak | Spacewatch | ADE | 1.2 km | MPC · JPL |
| 757558 | 2004 BE_{139} | — | January 19, 2004 | Kitt Peak | Spacewatch | · | 730 m | MPC · JPL |
| 757559 | 2004 BP_{139} | — | January 19, 2004 | Kitt Peak | Spacewatch | · | 2.4 km | MPC · JPL |
| 757560 | 2004 BT_{154} | — | January 28, 2004 | Kitt Peak | Spacewatch | · | 2.1 km | MPC · JPL |
| 757561 | 2004 BC_{155} | — | January 28, 2004 | Kitt Peak | Spacewatch | · | 2.0 km | MPC · JPL |
| 757562 | 2004 BW_{165} | — | September 25, 2006 | Kitt Peak | Spacewatch | · | 510 m | MPC · JPL |
| 757563 | 2004 BH_{167} | — | February 16, 2015 | Haleakala | Pan-STARRS 1 | · | 620 m | MPC · JPL |
| 757564 | 2004 BE_{168} | — | February 9, 2013 | Haleakala | Pan-STARRS 1 | HNS | 760 m | MPC · JPL |
| 757565 | 2004 BF_{168} | — | September 24, 2011 | Haleakala | Pan-STARRS 1 | · | 1.1 km | MPC · JPL |
| 757566 | 2004 BF_{171} | — | October 3, 2013 | Mount Lemmon | Mount Lemmon Survey | EOS | 1.2 km | MPC · JPL |
| 757567 | 2004 BH_{172} | — | November 1, 2013 | Mount Lemmon | Mount Lemmon Survey | · | 2.3 km | MPC · JPL |
| 757568 | 2004 BJ_{172} | — | January 19, 2004 | Kitt Peak | Spacewatch | · | 930 m | MPC · JPL |
| 757569 | 2004 BS_{172} | — | December 17, 2003 | Kitt Peak | Spacewatch | · | 1.1 km | MPC · JPL |
| 757570 | 2004 BQ_{173} | — | January 31, 2004 | Apache Point | SDSS | · | 1.3 km | MPC · JPL |
| 757571 | 2004 CM_{8} | — | January 30, 2004 | Kitt Peak | Spacewatch | · | 1.9 km | MPC · JPL |
| 757572 | 2004 CL_{9} | — | February 11, 2004 | Kitt Peak | Spacewatch | (2076) | 600 m | MPC · JPL |
| 757573 | 2004 CH_{88} | — | February 11, 2004 | Kitt Peak | Spacewatch | · | 2.0 km | MPC · JPL |
| 757574 | 2004 CV_{121} | — | February 12, 2004 | Kitt Peak | Spacewatch | (1298) | 1.9 km | MPC · JPL |
| 757575 | 2004 CV_{131} | — | April 2, 2009 | Kitt Peak | Spacewatch | MRX | 800 m | MPC · JPL |
| 757576 | 2004 CA_{132} | — | March 28, 2008 | Mount Lemmon | Mount Lemmon Survey | MAS | 550 m | MPC · JPL |
| 757577 | 2004 CK_{132} | — | February 24, 2015 | Haleakala | Pan-STARRS 1 | · | 540 m | MPC · JPL |
| 757578 | 2004 CK_{134} | — | May 27, 2014 | Haleakala | Pan-STARRS 1 | · | 1.6 km | MPC · JPL |
| 757579 | 2004 CE_{136} | — | February 14, 2004 | Kitt Peak | Spacewatch | EMA | 2.0 km | MPC · JPL |
| 757580 | 2004 DW_{27} | — | February 16, 2004 | Kitt Peak | Spacewatch | · | 2.7 km | MPC · JPL |
| 757581 | 2004 DW_{69} | — | February 26, 2004 | Kitt Peak | Deep Ecliptic Survey | · | 1.4 km | MPC · JPL |
| 757582 | 2004 DV_{78} | — | February 29, 2004 | Kitt Peak | Spacewatch | · | 1.1 km | MPC · JPL |
| 757583 | 2004 DZ_{81} | — | October 31, 2013 | Kitt Peak | Spacewatch | · | 1.4 km | MPC · JPL |
| 757584 | 2004 DB_{84} | — | September 12, 2016 | Haleakala | Pan-STARRS 1 | PHO | 660 m | MPC · JPL |
| 757585 | 2004 DH_{84} | — | April 13, 2013 | Haleakala | Pan-STARRS 1 | · | 1.0 km | MPC · JPL |
| 757586 | 2004 DK_{84} | — | January 26, 2011 | Kitt Peak | Spacewatch | · | 560 m | MPC · JPL |
| 757587 | 2004 DP_{86} | — | September 24, 2015 | Mount Lemmon | Mount Lemmon Survey | · | 1.1 km | MPC · JPL |
| 757588 | 2004 DU_{87} | — | February 15, 2013 | Haleakala | Pan-STARRS 1 | · | 1.3 km | MPC · JPL |
| 757589 | 2004 DV_{87} | — | March 19, 2013 | Haleakala | Pan-STARRS 1 | · | 1.3 km | MPC · JPL |
| 757590 | 2004 DX_{88} | — | November 28, 2013 | Mount Lemmon | Mount Lemmon Survey | EOS | 1.4 km | MPC · JPL |
| 757591 | 2004 DF_{89} | — | January 16, 2015 | Haleakala | Pan-STARRS 1 | · | 2.3 km | MPC · JPL |
| 757592 | 2004 DH_{89} | — | March 25, 2017 | Mount Lemmon | Mount Lemmon Survey | · | 960 m | MPC · JPL |
| 757593 | 2004 EC_{1} | — | March 14, 2004 | Wrightwood | J. W. Young | · | 2.0 km | MPC · JPL |
| 757594 | 2004 EA_{47} | — | March 15, 2004 | Kitt Peak | Spacewatch | · | 1.7 km | MPC · JPL |
| 757595 | 2004 EK_{88} | — | March 14, 2004 | Kitt Peak | Spacewatch | · | 1.3 km | MPC · JPL |
| 757596 | 2004 EY_{106} | — | March 15, 2004 | Kitt Peak | Spacewatch | · | 1.3 km | MPC · JPL |
| 757597 | 2004 EX_{109} | — | March 15, 2004 | Kitt Peak | Spacewatch | TIR | 2.2 km | MPC · JPL |
| 757598 | 2004 EC_{113} | — | March 15, 2004 | Kitt Peak | Spacewatch | · | 2.5 km | MPC · JPL |
| 757599 | 2004 EP_{116} | — | November 11, 2006 | Mount Lemmon | Mount Lemmon Survey | · | 620 m | MPC · JPL |
| 757600 | 2004 EZ_{116} | — | March 22, 2015 | Mount Lemmon | Mount Lemmon Survey | NYS | 750 m | MPC · JPL |

== 757601–757700 ==
back to top

| Designation | | | Discovery | | | Properties | | Ref |
| Permanent | Provisional | Named after | Date | Site | Discoverer(s) | Category | Diam. | Ref |
|---|---|---|---|---|---|---|---|---|
| 757601 | 2004 EC_{117} | — | March 15, 2004 | Kitt Peak | Spacewatch | · | 690 m | MPC · JPL |
| 757602 | 2004 EX_{117} | — | March 15, 2004 | Kitt Peak | Spacewatch | H | 370 m | MPC · JPL |
| 757603 | 2004 FA_{57} | — | March 17, 2004 | Kitt Peak | Spacewatch | · | 2.4 km | MPC · JPL |
| 757604 | 2004 FB_{80} | — | March 21, 2004 | Kitt Peak | Spacewatch | · | 1.9 km | MPC · JPL |
| 757605 | 2004 FK_{85} | — | March 18, 2004 | Kitt Peak | Spacewatch | · | 1.4 km | MPC · JPL |
| 757606 | 2004 FE_{103} | — | March 15, 2004 | Kitt Peak | Spacewatch | · | 2.1 km | MPC · JPL |
| 757607 | 2004 FP_{113} | — | March 21, 2004 | Kitt Peak | Spacewatch | · | 1.9 km | MPC · JPL |
| 757608 | 2004 FC_{132} | — | March 15, 2004 | Kitt Peak | Spacewatch | · | 560 m | MPC · JPL |
| 757609 | 2004 FR_{136} | — | February 17, 2004 | Kitt Peak | Spacewatch | · | 1.2 km | MPC · JPL |
| 757610 | 2004 FV_{153} | — | March 17, 2004 | Kitt Peak | Spacewatch | PHO | 590 m | MPC · JPL |
| 757611 | 2004 FB_{155} | — | February 26, 2004 | Kitt Peak | Deep Ecliptic Survey | · | 870 m | MPC · JPL |
| 757612 | 2004 FG_{169} | — | October 23, 2006 | Mount Lemmon | Mount Lemmon Survey | NYS | 740 m | MPC · JPL |
| 757613 | 2004 FH_{169} | — | February 9, 2011 | Mount Lemmon | Mount Lemmon Survey | · | 680 m | MPC · JPL |
| 757614 | 2004 FF_{171} | — | August 15, 2014 | Haleakala | Pan-STARRS 1 | HNS | 1.1 km | MPC · JPL |
| 757615 | 2004 FH_{171} | — | January 25, 2015 | Haleakala | Pan-STARRS 1 | · | 940 m | MPC · JPL |
| 757616 | 2004 FT_{171} | — | December 18, 2007 | Mount Lemmon | Mount Lemmon Survey | · | 1.1 km | MPC · JPL |
| 757617 | 2004 FR_{173} | — | March 16, 2004 | Kitt Peak | Spacewatch | · | 840 m | MPC · JPL |
| 757618 | 2004 FZ_{173} | — | April 11, 2011 | Mount Lemmon | Mount Lemmon Survey | V | 430 m | MPC · JPL |
| 757619 | 2004 FP_{174} | — | November 29, 2014 | Mount Lemmon | Mount Lemmon Survey | · | 990 m | MPC · JPL |
| 757620 | 2004 FS_{174} | — | February 22, 2017 | Mount Lemmon | Mount Lemmon Survey | · | 1.6 km | MPC · JPL |
| 757621 | 2004 FY_{174} | — | November 8, 2013 | Mount Lemmon | Mount Lemmon Survey | · | 590 m | MPC · JPL |
| 757622 | 2004 FS_{175} | — | November 7, 2015 | Haleakala | Pan-STARRS 1 | · | 1.5 km | MPC · JPL |
| 757623 | 2004 FF_{176} | — | February 10, 2011 | Mount Lemmon | Mount Lemmon Survey | · | 680 m | MPC · JPL |
| 757624 | 2004 FG_{177} | — | January 23, 2015 | Haleakala | Pan-STARRS 1 | · | 2.0 km | MPC · JPL |
| 757625 | 2004 FM_{177} | — | October 8, 2012 | Kitt Peak | Spacewatch | · | 2.3 km | MPC · JPL |
| 757626 | 2004 FN_{177} | — | February 19, 2015 | Haleakala | Pan-STARRS 1 | · | 2.5 km | MPC · JPL |
| 757627 | 2004 GO_{25} | — | April 14, 2004 | Kitt Peak | Spacewatch | · | 1.1 km | MPC · JPL |
| 757628 | 2004 GJ_{51} | — | April 13, 2004 | Kitt Peak | Spacewatch | · | 2.2 km | MPC · JPL |
| 757629 | 2004 GU_{82} | — | April 14, 2004 | Kitt Peak | Spacewatch | · | 1.3 km | MPC · JPL |
| 757630 | 2004 GZ_{85} | — | April 14, 2004 | Kitt Peak | Spacewatch | · | 1.7 km | MPC · JPL |
| 757631 | 2004 GG_{90} | — | April 14, 2004 | Kitt Peak | Spacewatch | · | 2.3 km | MPC · JPL |
| 757632 | 2004 GL_{90} | — | June 11, 2011 | Mount Lemmon | Mount Lemmon Survey | · | 590 m | MPC · JPL |
| 757633 | 2004 GN_{90} | — | April 25, 2015 | Haleakala | Pan-STARRS 1 | · | 740 m | MPC · JPL |
| 757634 | 2004 GJ_{91} | — | October 9, 2010 | Mount Lemmon | Mount Lemmon Survey | · | 1.4 km | MPC · JPL |
| 757635 | 2004 HG_{37} | — | April 21, 2004 | Kitt Peak | Spacewatch | T_{j} (2.99) | 2.7 km | MPC · JPL |
| 757636 | 2004 HZ_{65} | — | April 20, 2004 | Kitt Peak | Spacewatch | · | 990 m | MPC · JPL |
| 757637 | 2004 HM_{82} | — | January 29, 2011 | Kitt Peak | Spacewatch | · | 750 m | MPC · JPL |
| 757638 | 2004 HD_{83} | — | February 8, 2011 | Mount Lemmon | Mount Lemmon Survey | NYS | 830 m | MPC · JPL |
| 757639 | 2004 HA_{85} | — | March 21, 2015 | Haleakala | Pan-STARRS 1 | · | 2.1 km | MPC · JPL |
| 757640 | 2004 HG_{86} | — | April 25, 2004 | Kitt Peak | Spacewatch | · | 1.4 km | MPC · JPL |
| 757641 | 2004 JM | — | May 9, 2004 | Kitt Peak | Spacewatch | · | 2.7 km | MPC · JPL |
| 757642 | 2004 JF_{48} | — | May 13, 2004 | Kitt Peak | Spacewatch | · | 610 m | MPC · JPL |
| 757643 | 2004 JE_{57} | — | September 26, 2011 | Haleakala | Pan-STARRS 1 | · | 520 m | MPC · JPL |
| 757644 | 2004 KZ_{15} | — | May 24, 2004 | Socorro | LINEAR | PHO | 710 m | MPC · JPL |
| 757645 | 2004 KK_{20} | — | May 28, 2004 | Kitt Peak | Spacewatch | · | 2.3 km | MPC · JPL |
| 757646 | 2004 KW_{20} | — | January 2, 2012 | Kitt Peak | Spacewatch | · | 1.2 km | MPC · JPL |
| 757647 | 2004 KG_{21} | — | November 10, 2010 | Mount Lemmon | Mount Lemmon Survey | · | 1.7 km | MPC · JPL |
| 757648 | 2004 KJ_{21} | — | May 23, 2018 | Haleakala | Pan-STARRS 1 | · | 1.7 km | MPC · JPL |
| 757649 | 2004 KP_{21} | — | April 18, 2013 | Mount Lemmon | Mount Lemmon Survey | · | 1.5 km | MPC · JPL |
| 757650 | 2004 LK_{27} | — | June 13, 2004 | Kitt Peak | Spacewatch | · | 810 m | MPC · JPL |
| 757651 | 2004 LB_{32} | — | August 20, 2009 | Kitt Peak | Spacewatch | · | 1.0 km | MPC · JPL |
| 757652 | 2004 MG_{9} | — | February 11, 2011 | Mount Lemmon | Mount Lemmon Survey | · | 710 m | MPC · JPL |
| 757653 | 2004 MK_{9} | — | September 2, 2008 | Kitt Peak | Spacewatch | · | 1.0 km | MPC · JPL |
| 757654 | 2004 OK_{16} | — | April 27, 2012 | Haleakala | Pan-STARRS 1 | H | 400 m | MPC · JPL |
| 757655 | 2004 OS_{16} | — | October 9, 2015 | Haleakala | Pan-STARRS 1 | · | 540 m | MPC · JPL |
| 757656 | 2004 ON_{17} | — | July 17, 2004 | Cerro Tololo | Deep Ecliptic Survey | · | 950 m | MPC · JPL |
| 757657 | 2004 PK_{38} | — | August 9, 2004 | Socorro | LINEAR | · | 970 m | MPC · JPL |
| 757658 | 2004 PN_{47} | — | August 8, 2004 | Socorro | LINEAR | · | 860 m | MPC · JPL |
| 757659 | 2004 PU_{120} | — | August 10, 2004 | Campo Imperatore | CINEOS | WAT | 1.1 km | MPC · JPL |
| 757660 | 2004 QC | — | August 16, 2004 | Wrightwood | J. W. Young | · | 1.7 km | MPC · JPL |
| 757661 | 2004 QD | — | August 16, 2004 | Wrightwood | J. W. Young | GEF | 900 m | MPC · JPL |
| 757662 | 2004 QF_{32} | — | August 23, 2004 | Kitt Peak | Spacewatch | · | 450 m | MPC · JPL |
| 757663 | 2004 QW_{34} | — | July 15, 2013 | Haleakala | Pan-STARRS 1 | · | 1.4 km | MPC · JPL |
| 757664 | 2004 QG_{36} | — | July 28, 2014 | Haleakala | Pan-STARRS 1 | · | 1.5 km | MPC · JPL |
| 757665 | 2004 QH_{37} | — | August 23, 2004 | Kitt Peak | Spacewatch | · | 470 m | MPC · JPL |
| 757666 | 2004 RU_{50} | — | September 8, 2004 | Socorro | LINEAR | · | 540 m | MPC · JPL |
| 757667 | 2004 RW_{63} | — | August 15, 2004 | Campo Imperatore | CINEOS | · | 1.3 km | MPC · JPL |
| 757668 | 2004 RD_{85} | — | August 20, 2004 | Kitt Peak | Spacewatch | · | 1.3 km | MPC · JPL |
| 757669 | 2004 RO_{119} | — | September 7, 2004 | Kitt Peak | Spacewatch | · | 660 m | MPC · JPL |
| 757670 | 2004 RF_{130} | — | September 7, 2004 | Kitt Peak | Spacewatch | · | 820 m | MPC · JPL |
| 757671 | 2004 RV_{258} | — | September 10, 2004 | Kitt Peak | Spacewatch | · | 920 m | MPC · JPL |
| 757672 | 2004 RT_{264} | — | September 10, 2004 | Kitt Peak | Spacewatch | · | 1.5 km | MPC · JPL |
| 757673 | 2004 RX_{301} | — | September 11, 2004 | Kitt Peak | Spacewatch | · | 660 m | MPC · JPL |
| 757674 | 2004 RD_{303} | — | September 12, 2004 | Kitt Peak | Spacewatch | · | 2.2 km | MPC · JPL |
| 757675 | 2004 RR_{346} | — | September 10, 2004 | Socorro | LINEAR | · | 700 m | MPC · JPL |
| 757676 | 2004 RV_{359} | — | October 24, 2011 | Haleakala | Pan-STARRS 1 | · | 510 m | MPC · JPL |
| 757677 | 2004 RB_{360} | — | September 11, 2004 | Kitt Peak | Spacewatch | · | 400 m | MPC · JPL |
| 757678 | 2004 RE_{360} | — | May 23, 2014 | Haleakala | Pan-STARRS 1 | · | 560 m | MPC · JPL |
| 757679 | 2004 RE_{361} | — | October 20, 2004 | Catalina | CSS | · | 910 m | MPC · JPL |
| 757680 | 2004 RE_{362} | — | January 15, 2018 | Haleakala | Pan-STARRS 1 | NYS | 1.1 km | MPC · JPL |
| 757681 | 2004 RM_{362} | — | February 7, 2011 | Mount Lemmon | Mount Lemmon Survey | GEF | 940 m | MPC · JPL |
| 757682 | 2004 RR_{364} | — | January 3, 2016 | Haleakala | Pan-STARRS 1 | · | 1.3 km | MPC · JPL |
| 757683 | 2004 RA_{365} | — | February 28, 2012 | Haleakala | Pan-STARRS 1 | · | 1.3 km | MPC · JPL |
| 757684 | 2004 RB_{367} | — | September 7, 2004 | Kitt Peak | Spacewatch | · | 1.2 km | MPC · JPL |
| 757685 | 2004 SG_{38} | — | September 17, 2004 | Kitt Peak | Spacewatch | · | 1.3 km | MPC · JPL |
| 757686 | 2004 SO_{65} | — | October 26, 2011 | Haleakala | Pan-STARRS 1 | · | 2.5 km | MPC · JPL |
| 757687 | 2004 TZ_{22} | — | October 4, 2004 | Kitt Peak | Spacewatch | · | 2.1 km | MPC · JPL |
| 757688 | 2004 TY_{24} | — | October 4, 2004 | Kitt Peak | Spacewatch | · | 1.8 km | MPC · JPL |
| 757689 | 2004 TO_{64} | — | September 17, 2004 | Kitt Peak | Spacewatch | · | 1.6 km | MPC · JPL |
| 757690 | 2004 TS_{96} | — | October 5, 2004 | Kitt Peak | Spacewatch | · | 1.4 km | MPC · JPL |
| 757691 | 2004 TF_{140} | — | October 4, 2004 | Kitt Peak | Spacewatch | (5) | 800 m | MPC · JPL |
| 757692 | 2004 TZ_{151} | — | October 6, 2004 | Kitt Peak | Spacewatch | · | 1.3 km | MPC · JPL |
| 757693 | 2004 TS_{188} | — | October 7, 2004 | Kitt Peak | Spacewatch | · | 1.2 km | MPC · JPL |
| 757694 | 2004 TJ_{199} | — | September 23, 2004 | Kitt Peak | Spacewatch | SYL | 3.1 km | MPC · JPL |
| 757695 | 2004 TH_{224} | — | October 8, 2004 | Kitt Peak | Spacewatch | · | 1.1 km | MPC · JPL |
| 757696 | 2004 TE_{238} | — | September 17, 2004 | Kitt Peak | Spacewatch | · | 1.3 km | MPC · JPL |
| 757697 | 2004 TN_{239} | — | October 9, 2004 | Kitt Peak | Spacewatch | · | 780 m | MPC · JPL |
| 757698 | 2004 TQ_{254} | — | October 9, 2004 | Kitt Peak | Spacewatch | · | 3.5 km | MPC · JPL |
| 757699 | 2004 TV_{352} | — | October 11, 2004 | Kitt Peak | Deep Ecliptic Survey | · | 550 m | MPC · JPL |
| 757700 | 2004 TJ_{362} | — | October 15, 2004 | Mount Lemmon | Mount Lemmon Survey | · | 1.1 km | MPC · JPL |

== 757701–757800 ==
back to top

| Designation | | | Discovery | | | Properties | | Ref |
| Permanent | Provisional | Named after | Date | Site | Discoverer(s) | Category | Diam. | Ref |
|---|---|---|---|---|---|---|---|---|
| 757701 | 2004 TD_{376} | — | October 10, 2004 | Kitt Peak | Deep Ecliptic Survey | · | 1.3 km | MPC · JPL |
| 757702 | 2004 TW_{379} | — | April 19, 2007 | Kitt Peak | Spacewatch | · | 980 m | MPC · JPL |
| 757703 | 2004 TA_{381} | — | September 17, 2009 | Kitt Peak | Spacewatch | · | 1.5 km | MPC · JPL |
| 757704 | 2004 TY_{382} | — | October 5, 2004 | Kitt Peak | Spacewatch | · | 1.2 km | MPC · JPL |
| 757705 | 2004 TN_{384} | — | September 29, 2009 | Mount Lemmon | Mount Lemmon Survey | · | 1.5 km | MPC · JPL |
| 757706 | 2004 VL_{34} | — | November 3, 2004 | Kitt Peak | Spacewatch | EOS | 1.5 km | MPC · JPL |
| 757707 | 2004 VF_{86} | — | November 10, 2004 | Kitt Peak | Spacewatch | · | 1.1 km | MPC · JPL |
| 757708 | 2004 VQ_{96} | — | November 11, 2004 | Kitt Peak | Spacewatch | · | 540 m | MPC · JPL |
| 757709 | 2004 VG_{98} | — | November 9, 2004 | Mauna Kea | Veillet, C. | · | 1.2 km | MPC · JPL |
| 757710 | 2004 VR_{104} | — | November 9, 2004 | Mauna Kea | Veillet, C. | · | 1.3 km | MPC · JPL |
| 757711 | 2004 VQ_{110} | — | November 9, 2004 | Mauna Kea | Veillet, C. | · | 1.3 km | MPC · JPL |
| 757712 | 2004 VH_{116} | — | October 10, 2004 | Kitt Peak | Spacewatch | · | 530 m | MPC · JPL |
| 757713 | 2004 VK_{133} | — | September 17, 2017 | Haleakala | Pan-STARRS 1 | · | 510 m | MPC · JPL |
| 757714 | 2004 VK_{135} | — | November 16, 1995 | Kitt Peak | Spacewatch | · | 1.2 km | MPC · JPL |
| 757715 | 2004 VG_{137} | — | February 4, 2016 | Haleakala | Pan-STARRS 1 | · | 1.6 km | MPC · JPL |
| 757716 | 2004 VK_{137} | — | January 6, 2013 | Kitt Peak | Spacewatch | MAS | 520 m | MPC · JPL |
| 757717 | 2004 WF_{13} | — | April 27, 2012 | Haleakala | Pan-STARRS 1 | · | 1.9 km | MPC · JPL |
| 757718 | 2004 XD_{114} | — | December 10, 2004 | Kitt Peak | Spacewatch | · | 1.1 km | MPC · JPL |
| 757719 | 2004 XJ_{190} | — | December 15, 2004 | Mauna Kea | P. A. Wiegert, D. D. Balam | · | 860 m | MPC · JPL |
| 757720 | 2004 XO_{194} | — | October 9, 2007 | Kitt Peak | Spacewatch | · | 540 m | MPC · JPL |
| 757721 | 2004 XX_{195} | — | November 17, 2014 | Mount Lemmon | Mount Lemmon Survey | · | 1.3 km | MPC · JPL |
| 757722 | 2004 XW_{196} | — | December 31, 2013 | Haleakala | Pan-STARRS 1 | · | 1.1 km | MPC · JPL |
| 757723 | 2004 YU_{12} | — | December 19, 2004 | Mount Lemmon | Mount Lemmon Survey | · | 1.6 km | MPC · JPL |
| 757724 | 2004 YT_{25} | — | December 19, 2004 | Mount Lemmon | Mount Lemmon Survey | (5) | 970 m | MPC · JPL |
| 757725 | 2004 YS_{36} | — | December 19, 2004 | Mount Lemmon | Mount Lemmon Survey | · | 1.8 km | MPC · JPL |
| 757726 | 2004 YU_{40} | — | December 19, 2004 | Mount Lemmon | Mount Lemmon Survey | · | 450 m | MPC · JPL |
| 757727 | 2004 YL_{41} | — | December 18, 2004 | Mount Lemmon | Mount Lemmon Survey | JUN | 880 m | MPC · JPL |
| 757728 | 2005 BC_{32} | — | January 16, 2005 | Mauna Kea | Veillet, C. | · | 1.8 km | MPC · JPL |
| 757729 | 2005 BL_{34} | — | January 16, 2005 | Mauna Kea | Veillet, C. | · | 970 m | MPC · JPL |
| 757730 | 2005 BV_{39} | — | January 19, 2005 | Kitt Peak | Spacewatch | (5) | 860 m | MPC · JPL |
| 757731 | 2005 BK_{42} | — | January 19, 2005 | Kitt Peak | Spacewatch | · | 890 m | MPC · JPL |
| 757732 | 2005 BJ_{45} | — | September 22, 2003 | Kitt Peak | Spacewatch | · | 1.2 km | MPC · JPL |
| 757733 | 2005 BR_{53} | — | September 30, 2008 | Catalina | CSS | · | 1.9 km | MPC · JPL |
| 757734 | 2005 BO_{55} | — | November 23, 2014 | Mount Lemmon | Mount Lemmon Survey | · | 2.0 km | MPC · JPL |
| 757735 | 2005 CF_{54} | — | February 4, 2005 | Kitt Peak | Spacewatch | · | 1.8 km | MPC · JPL |
| 757736 | 2005 CB_{55} | — | February 4, 2005 | Mount Lemmon | Mount Lemmon Survey | · | 490 m | MPC · JPL |
| 757737 | 2005 CP_{70} | — | February 8, 2005 | Mauna Kea | Veillet, C. | · | 2.0 km | MPC · JPL |
| 757738 | 2005 CT_{84} | — | October 22, 2014 | Mount Lemmon | Mount Lemmon Survey | EOS | 1.6 km | MPC · JPL |
| 757739 | 2005 CO_{86} | — | August 13, 2018 | Haleakala | Pan-STARRS 1 | EOS | 1.5 km | MPC · JPL |
| 757740 | 2005 CF_{87} | — | February 9, 2005 | Kitt Peak | Spacewatch | MAS | 470 m | MPC · JPL |
| 757741 | 2005 CJ_{87} | — | January 16, 2009 | Mount Lemmon | Mount Lemmon Survey | · | 1.0 km | MPC · JPL |
| 757742 | 2005 CD_{88} | — | June 19, 2006 | Mount Lemmon | Mount Lemmon Survey | · | 1.5 km | MPC · JPL |
| 757743 | 2005 CE_{88} | — | February 9, 2016 | Haleakala | Pan-STARRS 1 | · | 2.2 km | MPC · JPL |
| 757744 | 2005 CQ_{89} | — | February 1, 2005 | Kitt Peak | Spacewatch | AEO | 810 m | MPC · JPL |
| 757745 | 2005 CR_{89} | — | February 10, 2016 | Haleakala | Pan-STARRS 1 | · | 1.7 km | MPC · JPL |
| 757746 | 2005 DR_{2} | — | January 20, 2009 | Kitt Peak | Spacewatch | · | 1.1 km | MPC · JPL |
| 757747 | 2005 DX_{3} | — | February 9, 2016 | Haleakala | Pan-STARRS 1 | THB | 2.6 km | MPC · JPL |
| 757748 | 2005 EL_{47} | — | March 3, 2005 | Kitt Peak | Spacewatch | · | 1.9 km | MPC · JPL |
| 757749 | 2005 ES_{149} | — | March 10, 2005 | Kitt Peak | Spacewatch | · | 1.9 km | MPC · JPL |
| 757750 | 2005 ED_{163} | — | March 10, 2005 | Mount Lemmon | Mount Lemmon Survey | TIR | 2.1 km | MPC · JPL |
| 757751 | 2005 ET_{203} | — | February 4, 2005 | Kitt Peak | Spacewatch | · | 1.1 km | MPC · JPL |
| 757752 | 2005 EJ_{220} | — | November 26, 2014 | Haleakala | Pan-STARRS 1 | · | 580 m | MPC · JPL |
| 757753 | 2005 EJ_{227} | — | March 9, 2005 | Mount Lemmon | Mount Lemmon Survey | EOS | 1.4 km | MPC · JPL |
| 757754 | 2005 EL_{232} | — | March 10, 2005 | Mount Lemmon | Mount Lemmon Survey | · | 1.6 km | MPC · JPL |
| 757755 | 2005 ET_{232} | — | March 10, 2005 | Mount Lemmon | Mount Lemmon Survey | 3:2 · SHU | 4.0 km | MPC · JPL |
| 757756 | 2005 EL_{257} | — | March 11, 2005 | Mount Lemmon | Mount Lemmon Survey | HNS | 960 m | MPC · JPL |
| 757757 | 2005 EW_{260} | — | March 3, 2005 | Catalina | CSS | · | 1.6 km | MPC · JPL |
| 757758 | 2005 EB_{296} | — | March 9, 2005 | Kitt Peak | Deep Ecliptic Survey | L5 | 6.5 km | MPC · JPL |
| 757759 | 2005 EX_{303} | — | March 11, 2005 | Kitt Peak | Deep Ecliptic Survey | VER | 1.9 km | MPC · JPL |
| 757760 | 2005 EA_{308} | — | March 8, 2005 | Mount Lemmon | Mount Lemmon Survey | · | 1.5 km | MPC · JPL |
| 757761 | 2005 ER_{315} | — | March 11, 2005 | Kitt Peak | Spacewatch | · | 750 m | MPC · JPL |
| 757762 | 2005 EU_{332} | — | March 8, 2005 | Mount Lemmon | Mount Lemmon Survey | THM | 1.8 km | MPC · JPL |
| 757763 | 2005 EG_{333} | — | March 10, 2005 | Mount Lemmon | Mount Lemmon Survey | · | 2.0 km | MPC · JPL |
| 757764 | 2005 EO_{339} | — | September 18, 2011 | Mount Lemmon | Mount Lemmon Survey | · | 1.1 km | MPC · JPL |
| 757765 | 2005 EJ_{343} | — | April 6, 2016 | Mount Lemmon | Mount Lemmon Survey | · | 1.7 km | MPC · JPL |
| 757766 | 2005 EQ_{344} | — | August 21, 2015 | Haleakala | Pan-STARRS 1 | · | 1.1 km | MPC · JPL |
| 757767 | 2005 EX_{344} | — | October 19, 2012 | Mount Lemmon | Mount Lemmon Survey | · | 1.6 km | MPC · JPL |
| 757768 | 2005 EZ_{344} | — | January 20, 2015 | Haleakala | Pan-STARRS 1 | · | 1.2 km | MPC · JPL |
| 757769 | 2005 EL_{345} | — | January 16, 2015 | Haleakala | Pan-STARRS 1 | · | 470 m | MPC · JPL |
| 757770 | 2005 EY_{345} | — | May 21, 2014 | Haleakala | Pan-STARRS 1 | · | 940 m | MPC · JPL |
| 757771 | 2005 EP_{346} | — | July 28, 2011 | Haleakala | Pan-STARRS 1 | · | 1.5 km | MPC · JPL |
| 757772 | 2005 EB_{347} | — | October 3, 2013 | Kitt Peak | Spacewatch | EOS | 1.4 km | MPC · JPL |
| 757773 | 2005 EC_{347} | — | February 16, 2015 | Haleakala | Pan-STARRS 1 | · | 550 m | MPC · JPL |
| 757774 | 2005 EU_{348} | — | March 8, 2005 | Mount Lemmon | Mount Lemmon Survey | · | 1.7 km | MPC · JPL |
| 757775 | 2005 EG_{350} | — | March 10, 2005 | Mount Lemmon | Mount Lemmon Survey | LIX | 2.5 km | MPC · JPL |
| 757776 | 2005 EE_{351} | — | March 4, 2005 | Mount Lemmon | Mount Lemmon Survey | · | 1.2 km | MPC · JPL |
| 757777 | 2005 EK_{351} | — | March 8, 2005 | Mount Lemmon | Mount Lemmon Survey | · | 460 m | MPC · JPL |
| 757778 | 2005 EZ_{351} | — | March 11, 2005 | Mount Lemmon | Mount Lemmon Survey | EOS | 1.4 km | MPC · JPL |
| 757779 | 2005 FH_{6} | — | March 3, 2005 | Kitt Peak | Spacewatch | · | 920 m | MPC · JPL |
| 757780 | 2005 FK_{19} | — | February 10, 2016 | Haleakala | Pan-STARRS 1 | · | 2.0 km | MPC · JPL |
| 757781 | 2005 FS_{19} | — | March 17, 2005 | Kitt Peak | Spacewatch | LIX | 2.8 km | MPC · JPL |
| 757782 | 2005 GW_{15} | — | April 2, 2005 | Mount Lemmon | Mount Lemmon Survey | · | 1.9 km | MPC · JPL |
| 757783 | 2005 GE_{16} | — | March 9, 2005 | Mount Lemmon | Mount Lemmon Survey | EOS | 1.3 km | MPC · JPL |
| 757784 | 2005 GE_{24} | — | April 2, 2005 | Mount Lemmon | Mount Lemmon Survey | · | 950 m | MPC · JPL |
| 757785 | 2005 GG_{24} | — | March 10, 2005 | Kitt Peak | Deep Ecliptic Survey | · | 2.2 km | MPC · JPL |
| 757786 | 2005 GM_{85} | — | March 9, 2005 | Mount Lemmon | Mount Lemmon Survey | · | 2.4 km | MPC · JPL |
| 757787 | 2005 GX_{85} | — | April 4, 2005 | Mount Lemmon | Mount Lemmon Survey | VER | 1.9 km | MPC · JPL |
| 757788 | 2005 GT_{96} | — | April 6, 2005 | Mount Lemmon | Mount Lemmon Survey | T_{j} (2.99) | 2.4 km | MPC · JPL |
| 757789 | 2005 GD_{102} | — | April 9, 2005 | Kitt Peak | Spacewatch | · | 540 m | MPC · JPL |
| 757790 | 2005 GH_{107} | — | April 10, 2005 | Mount Lemmon | Mount Lemmon Survey | · | 2.0 km | MPC · JPL |
| 757791 | 2005 GT_{193} | — | April 10, 2005 | Kitt Peak | Deep Ecliptic Survey | · | 830 m | MPC · JPL |
| 757792 | 2005 GZ_{193} | — | April 10, 2005 | Kitt Peak | Deep Ecliptic Survey | · | 1.1 km | MPC · JPL |
| 757793 | 2005 GG_{197} | — | April 10, 2005 | Kitt Peak | Deep Ecliptic Survey | EOS | 1.3 km | MPC · JPL |
| 757794 | 2005 GM_{199} | — | April 10, 2005 | Kitt Peak | Deep Ecliptic Survey | · | 1.1 km | MPC · JPL |
| 757795 | 2005 GG_{203} | — | April 7, 2005 | Mount Lemmon | Mount Lemmon Survey | · | 2.0 km | MPC · JPL |
| 757796 | 2005 GG_{204} | — | April 10, 2005 | Mount Lemmon | Mount Lemmon Survey | · | 1.2 km | MPC · JPL |
| 757797 | 2005 GE_{208} | — | April 11, 2005 | Mount Lemmon | Mount Lemmon Survey | · | 1.1 km | MPC · JPL |
| 757798 | 2005 GZ_{217} | — | April 2, 2005 | Mount Lemmon | Mount Lemmon Survey | V | 420 m | MPC · JPL |
| 757799 | 2005 GH_{233} | — | April 1, 2005 | Kitt Peak | Spacewatch | BAP | 620 m | MPC · JPL |
| 757800 | 2005 GM_{234} | — | April 19, 2012 | Mount Lemmon | Mount Lemmon Survey | · | 510 m | MPC · JPL |

== 757801–757900 ==
back to top

| Designation | | | Discovery | | | Properties | | Ref |
| Permanent | Provisional | Named after | Date | Site | Discoverer(s) | Category | Diam. | Ref |
|---|---|---|---|---|---|---|---|---|
| 757801 | 2005 GP_{234} | — | July 12, 2016 | Mount Lemmon | Mount Lemmon Survey | · | 590 m | MPC · JPL |
| 757802 | 2005 GE_{235} | — | March 28, 2012 | Kitt Peak | Spacewatch | · | 530 m | MPC · JPL |
| 757803 | 2005 GV_{235} | — | September 13, 2007 | Mount Lemmon | Mount Lemmon Survey | · | 1.6 km | MPC · JPL |
| 757804 | 2005 GY_{235} | — | September 13, 2007 | Mount Lemmon | Mount Lemmon Survey | THM | 1.9 km | MPC · JPL |
| 757805 | 2005 GZ_{235} | — | January 29, 2015 | Haleakala | Pan-STARRS 1 | · | 2.0 km | MPC · JPL |
| 757806 | 2005 GW_{236} | — | May 8, 2014 | Haleakala | Pan-STARRS 1 | · | 1.1 km | MPC · JPL |
| 757807 | 2005 GX_{236} | — | September 1, 2013 | Haleakala | Pan-STARRS 1 | · | 880 m | MPC · JPL |
| 757808 | 2005 GL_{237} | — | September 12, 2015 | Haleakala | Pan-STARRS 1 | · | 1.1 km | MPC · JPL |
| 757809 | 2005 GN_{237} | — | November 9, 2007 | Kitt Peak | Spacewatch | · | 820 m | MPC · JPL |
| 757810 | 2005 GE_{238} | — | April 10, 2005 | Mount Lemmon | Mount Lemmon Survey | · | 1.1 km | MPC · JPL |
| 757811 | 2005 GJ_{238} | — | May 21, 2014 | Haleakala | Pan-STARRS 1 | · | 1.0 km | MPC · JPL |
| 757812 | 2005 GT_{238} | — | April 11, 2005 | Mount Lemmon | Mount Lemmon Survey | MAS | 550 m | MPC · JPL |
| 757813 | 2005 GG_{239} | — | April 2, 2005 | Kitt Peak | Spacewatch | · | 1.4 km | MPC · JPL |
| 757814 | 2005 GJ_{240} | — | April 14, 2005 | Kitt Peak | Spacewatch | · | 1.4 km | MPC · JPL |
| 757815 | 2005 HP_{12} | — | April 17, 2005 | Kitt Peak | Spacewatch | MIS | 2.0 km | MPC · JPL |
| 757816 | 2005 HY_{12} | — | April 18, 2005 | Kitt Peak | Spacewatch | · | 2.0 km | MPC · JPL |
| 757817 | 2005 HC_{13} | — | April 16, 2005 | Kitt Peak | Spacewatch | THM | 1.8 km | MPC · JPL |
| 757818 | 2005 JV_{5} | — | May 4, 2005 | Mauna Kea | Veillet, C. | KOR | 1.0 km | MPC · JPL |
| 757819 | 2005 JB_{7} | — | May 4, 2005 | Mauna Kea | Veillet, C. | · | 1.6 km | MPC · JPL |
| 757820 | 2005 JC_{7} | — | April 2, 2005 | Mount Lemmon | Mount Lemmon Survey | 3:2 | 3.8 km | MPC · JPL |
| 757821 | 2005 JV_{8} | — | May 4, 2005 | Mauna Kea | Veillet, C. | · | 1.2 km | MPC · JPL |
| 757822 | 2005 JJ_{15} | — | May 3, 2005 | Kitt Peak | Spacewatch | · | 730 m | MPC · JPL |
| 757823 | 2005 JM_{21} | — | April 16, 2005 | Kitt Peak | Spacewatch | · | 2.7 km | MPC · JPL |
| 757824 | 2005 JT_{39} | — | May 7, 2005 | Mount Lemmon | Mount Lemmon Survey | EUN | 1.0 km | MPC · JPL |
| 757825 | 2005 JN_{40} | — | May 7, 2005 | Mount Lemmon | Mount Lemmon Survey | · | 1.3 km | MPC · JPL |
| 757826 | 2005 JJ_{94} | — | May 7, 2005 | Kitt Peak | Spacewatch | · | 1.6 km | MPC · JPL |
| 757827 | 2005 JE_{120} | — | May 10, 2005 | Kitt Peak | Spacewatch | (2076) | 500 m | MPC · JPL |
| 757828 | 2005 JA_{123} | — | May 11, 2005 | Kitt Peak | Spacewatch | LIX | 2.5 km | MPC · JPL |
| 757829 | 2005 JU_{150} | — | May 3, 2005 | Kitt Peak | Spacewatch | · | 2.7 km | MPC · JPL |
| 757830 | 2005 JL_{172} | — | May 10, 2005 | Kitt Peak | Spacewatch | · | 2.2 km | MPC · JPL |
| 757831 | 2005 JK_{189} | — | May 14, 2005 | Mount Lemmon | Mount Lemmon Survey | · | 850 m | MPC · JPL |
| 757832 | 2005 JO_{189} | — | June 28, 2014 | Haleakala | Pan-STARRS 1 | · | 1.0 km | MPC · JPL |
| 757833 | 2005 JG_{191} | — | May 13, 2005 | Kitt Peak | Spacewatch | · | 1.2 km | MPC · JPL |
| 757834 | 2005 JS_{192} | — | November 27, 2014 | Haleakala | Pan-STARRS 1 | · | 780 m | MPC · JPL |
| 757835 | 2005 JY_{192} | — | May 7, 2014 | Haleakala | Pan-STARRS 1 | · | 1.3 km | MPC · JPL |
| 757836 | 2005 JK_{193} | — | April 25, 2015 | Haleakala | Pan-STARRS 1 | · | 480 m | MPC · JPL |
| 757837 | 2005 JL_{193} | — | May 14, 2005 | Kitt Peak | Spacewatch | · | 2.6 km | MPC · JPL |
| 757838 | 2005 JC_{194} | — | October 13, 2013 | Calar Alto-CASADO | Proffe, G., Hellmich, S. | (1118) | 2.5 km | MPC · JPL |
| 757839 | 2005 JD_{194} | — | February 15, 2013 | Haleakala | Pan-STARRS 1 | · | 1.2 km | MPC · JPL |
| 757840 | 2005 JK_{194} | — | March 1, 2009 | Kitt Peak | Spacewatch | · | 1.3 km | MPC · JPL |
| 757841 | 2005 JL_{194} | — | November 1, 2013 | Mount Lemmon | Mount Lemmon Survey | EOS | 1.5 km | MPC · JPL |
| 757842 | 2005 JC_{195} | — | May 3, 2005 | Kitt Peak | Spacewatch | · | 1.2 km | MPC · JPL |
| 757843 | 2005 JH_{195} | — | May 11, 2005 | Kitt Peak | Spacewatch | · | 2.4 km | MPC · JPL |
| 757844 | 2005 KR_{4} | — | May 17, 2005 | Mount Lemmon | Mount Lemmon Survey | · | 1.4 km | MPC · JPL |
| 757845 | 2005 LR_{28} | — | May 17, 2005 | Mount Lemmon | Mount Lemmon Survey | PHO | 710 m | MPC · JPL |
| 757846 | 2005 LT_{28} | — | May 10, 2005 | Mount Lemmon | Mount Lemmon Survey | EUN | 960 m | MPC · JPL |
| 757847 | 2005 LU_{28} | — | June 10, 2005 | Kitt Peak | Spacewatch | · | 530 m | MPC · JPL |
| 757848 | 2005 LC_{35} | — | June 10, 2005 | Kitt Peak | Spacewatch | EUN | 960 m | MPC · JPL |
| 757849 | 2005 LB_{42} | — | June 13, 2005 | Mount Lemmon | Mount Lemmon Survey | · | 750 m | MPC · JPL |
| 757850 | 2005 LN_{46} | — | June 13, 2005 | Kitt Peak | Spacewatch | · | 940 m | MPC · JPL |
| 757851 | 2005 LO_{54} | — | August 8, 2017 | Haleakala | Pan-STARRS 1 | · | 2.9 km | MPC · JPL |
| 757852 | 2005 LT_{55} | — | June 8, 2005 | Kitt Peak | Spacewatch | · | 1.1 km | MPC · JPL |
| 757853 | 2005 LU_{56} | — | May 14, 2005 | Mount Lemmon | Mount Lemmon Survey | · | 980 m | MPC · JPL |
| 757854 | 2005 LX_{56} | — | October 25, 2015 | Haleakala | Pan-STARRS 1 | · | 1.3 km | MPC · JPL |
| 757855 | 2005 LL_{57} | — | April 9, 2016 | Haleakala | Pan-STARRS 1 | · | 2.4 km | MPC · JPL |
| 757856 | 2005 LE_{60} | — | June 11, 2005 | Kitt Peak | Spacewatch | · | 1.2 km | MPC · JPL |
| 757857 | 2005 LJ_{60} | — | June 11, 2005 | Kitt Peak | Spacewatch | · | 2.3 km | MPC · JPL |
| 757858 | 2005 MF_{14} | — | June 3, 2005 | Kitt Peak | Spacewatch | · | 1.3 km | MPC · JPL |
| 757859 | 2005 NA_{9} | — | June 17, 2005 | Mount Lemmon | Mount Lemmon Survey | · | 1.2 km | MPC · JPL |
| 757860 | 2005 NP_{25} | — | July 4, 2005 | Kitt Peak | Spacewatch | · | 1.6 km | MPC · JPL |
| 757861 | 2005 NQ_{44} | — | July 7, 2005 | Kitt Peak | Spacewatch | HNS | 1.1 km | MPC · JPL |
| 757862 | 2005 NJ_{62} | — | June 30, 2005 | Kitt Peak | Spacewatch | · | 2.6 km | MPC · JPL |
| 757863 | 2005 NR_{70} | — | July 4, 2005 | Mount Lemmon | Mount Lemmon Survey | · | 930 m | MPC · JPL |
| 757864 | 2005 NM_{75} | — | July 10, 2005 | Kitt Peak | Spacewatch | MAS | 600 m | MPC · JPL |
| 757865 | 2005 NK_{92} | — | July 5, 2005 | Kitt Peak | Spacewatch | (5) | 1.0 km | MPC · JPL |
| 757866 | 2005 NO_{107} | — | July 7, 2005 | Mauna Kea | Veillet, C. | · | 1.4 km | MPC · JPL |
| 757867 | 2005 NT_{108} | — | July 7, 2005 | Mauna Kea | Veillet, C. | · | 1.7 km | MPC · JPL |
| 757868 | 2005 NR_{113} | — | July 7, 2005 | Mauna Kea | Veillet, C. | · | 1.4 km | MPC · JPL |
| 757869 | 2005 NY_{119} | — | June 17, 2005 | Mount Lemmon | Mount Lemmon Survey | · | 1.8 km | MPC · JPL |
| 757870 | 2005 NY_{128} | — | July 4, 2016 | Haleakala | Pan-STARRS 1 | · | 860 m | MPC · JPL |
| 757871 | 2005 NO_{130} | — | July 6, 2005 | Kitt Peak | Spacewatch | GEF | 990 m | MPC · JPL |
| 757872 | 2005 NO_{131} | — | December 12, 2006 | Kitt Peak | Spacewatch | · | 660 m | MPC · JPL |
| 757873 | 2005 NA_{132} | — | January 13, 2015 | Haleakala | Pan-STARRS 1 | · | 2.8 km | MPC · JPL |
| 757874 | 2005 NB_{132} | — | September 5, 2010 | Mount Lemmon | Mount Lemmon Survey | · | 1.4 km | MPC · JPL |
| 757875 | 2005 OK_{2} | — | May 10, 2000 | Apache Point | SDSS | · | 1.5 km | MPC · JPL |
| 757876 | 2005 OD_{30} | — | July 31, 2005 | Mauna Kea | P. A. Wiegert, D. D. Balam | · | 2.3 km | MPC · JPL |
| 757877 | 2005 PZ_{23} | — | August 29, 2005 | Kitt Peak | Spacewatch | · | 1.4 km | MPC · JPL |
| 757878 | 2005 PJ_{30} | — | September 29, 2009 | Mount Lemmon | Mount Lemmon Survey | · | 890 m | MPC · JPL |
| 757879 | 2005 PL_{30} | — | July 25, 2014 | Haleakala | Pan-STARRS 1 | · | 1.2 km | MPC · JPL |
| 757880 | 2005 PT_{30} | — | August 2, 2016 | Haleakala | Pan-STARRS 1 | · | 830 m | MPC · JPL |
| 757881 | 2005 PY_{31} | — | October 8, 2012 | Kitt Peak | Spacewatch | · | 2.1 km | MPC · JPL |
| 757882 | 2005 QF_{98} | — | August 31, 2005 | Kitt Peak | Spacewatch | · | 490 m | MPC · JPL |
| 757883 | 2005 QL_{119} | — | August 28, 2005 | Kitt Peak | Spacewatch | (13314) | 1.3 km | MPC · JPL |
| 757884 | 2005 QT_{174} | — | August 31, 2005 | Kitt Peak | Spacewatch | · | 1.4 km | MPC · JPL |
| 757885 | 2005 QU_{187} | — | August 31, 2005 | Kitt Peak | Spacewatch | · | 1.6 km | MPC · JPL |
| 757886 | 2005 QA_{194} | — | August 31, 2005 | Kitt Peak | Spacewatch | · | 800 m | MPC · JPL |
| 757887 | 2005 QC_{202} | — | May 29, 2012 | Mount Lemmon | Mount Lemmon Survey | · | 800 m | MPC · JPL |
| 757888 | 2005 QF_{203} | — | October 24, 2011 | Haleakala | Pan-STARRS 1 | · | 1.1 km | MPC · JPL |
| 757889 | 2005 QP_{204} | — | February 19, 2009 | Kitt Peak | Spacewatch | · | 2.2 km | MPC · JPL |
| 757890 | 2005 QB_{207} | — | August 28, 2005 | Kitt Peak | Spacewatch | MAS | 450 m | MPC · JPL |
| 757891 | 2005 QS_{207} | — | September 17, 2017 | Haleakala | Pan-STARRS 1 | HYG | 1.9 km | MPC · JPL |
| 757892 | 2005 QM_{210} | — | August 29, 2005 | Kitt Peak | Spacewatch | EUN | 830 m | MPC · JPL |
| 757893 | 2005 QQ_{211} | — | February 9, 2008 | Mount Lemmon | Mount Lemmon Survey | · | 1.7 km | MPC · JPL |
| 757894 | 2005 RJ_{15} | — | September 1, 2005 | Kitt Peak | Spacewatch | · | 1.7 km | MPC · JPL |
| 757895 | 2005 RP_{15} | — | September 1, 2005 | Kitt Peak | Spacewatch | · | 490 m | MPC · JPL |
| 757896 | 2005 RE_{46} | — | February 19, 2007 | Mount Lemmon | Mount Lemmon Survey | · | 2.0 km | MPC · JPL |
| 757897 | 2005 RL_{46} | — | September 27, 2005 | Apache Point | SDSS Collaboration | VER | 1.9 km | MPC · JPL |
| 757898 | 2005 RX_{53} | — | October 1, 2014 | Haleakala | Pan-STARRS 1 | · | 1.4 km | MPC · JPL |
| 757899 | 2005 RD_{55} | — | March 17, 2012 | Mount Lemmon | Mount Lemmon Survey | · | 1.2 km | MPC · JPL |
| 757900 | 2005 RF_{57} | — | September 25, 2012 | Mount Lemmon | Mount Lemmon Survey | · | 660 m | MPC · JPL |

== 757901–758000 ==
back to top

| Designation | | | Discovery | | | Properties | | Ref |
| Permanent | Provisional | Named after | Date | Site | Discoverer(s) | Category | Diam. | Ref |
|---|---|---|---|---|---|---|---|---|
| 757901 | 2005 RO_{57} | — | August 30, 2005 | Kitt Peak | Spacewatch | DOR | 1.4 km | MPC · JPL |
| 757902 | 2005 RV_{57} | — | September 1, 2005 | Kitt Peak | Spacewatch | · | 1.2 km | MPC · JPL |
| 757903 | 2005 RD_{58} | — | September 8, 2005 | Siding Spring | SSS | · | 2.2 km | MPC · JPL |
| 757904 | 2005 RX_{59} | — | February 19, 2014 | Mount Lemmon | Mount Lemmon Survey | LIX | 3.0 km | MPC · JPL |
| 757905 | 2005 RZ_{59} | — | September 11, 2005 | Kitt Peak | Spacewatch | · | 1.1 km | MPC · JPL |
| 757906 | 2005 RR_{60} | — | September 11, 2005 | Kitt Peak | Spacewatch | · | 840 m | MPC · JPL |
| 757907 | 2005 RY_{60} | — | September 13, 2005 | Kitt Peak | Spacewatch | · | 860 m | MPC · JPL |
| 757908 | 2005 RA_{61} | — | September 11, 2005 | Kitt Peak | Spacewatch | MAS | 470 m | MPC · JPL |
| 757909 | 2005 RB_{61} | — | September 14, 2005 | Kitt Peak | Spacewatch | · | 910 m | MPC · JPL |
| 757910 | 2005 RG_{62} | — | September 1, 2005 | Kitt Peak | Spacewatch | · | 1.2 km | MPC · JPL |
| 757911 | 2005 RH_{64} | — | September 14, 2005 | Kitt Peak | Spacewatch | · | 950 m | MPC · JPL |
| 757912 | 2005 SK_{36} | — | September 24, 2005 | Kitt Peak | Spacewatch | · | 1.3 km | MPC · JPL |
| 757913 | 2005 SW_{56} | — | September 13, 2005 | Kitt Peak | Spacewatch | MAS | 520 m | MPC · JPL |
| 757914 | 2005 SL_{57} | — | September 26, 2005 | Kitt Peak | Spacewatch | · | 650 m | MPC · JPL |
| 757915 | 2005 SB_{83} | — | September 24, 2005 | Kitt Peak | Spacewatch | MAS | 540 m | MPC · JPL |
| 757916 | 2005 SS_{153} | — | September 26, 2005 | Kitt Peak | Spacewatch | · | 1.4 km | MPC · JPL |
| 757917 | 2005 SP_{162} | — | September 27, 2005 | Kitt Peak | Spacewatch | · | 710 m | MPC · JPL |
| 757918 | 2005 SH_{168} | — | September 1, 2005 | Kitt Peak | Spacewatch | · | 770 m | MPC · JPL |
| 757919 | 2005 SO_{179} | — | September 29, 2005 | Anderson Mesa | LONEOS | · | 950 m | MPC · JPL |
| 757920 | 2005 SQ_{187} | — | September 29, 2005 | Mount Lemmon | Mount Lemmon Survey | · | 810 m | MPC · JPL |
| 757921 | 2005 SC_{212} | — | September 30, 2005 | Mount Lemmon | Mount Lemmon Survey | · | 1.4 km | MPC · JPL |
| 757922 | 2005 SN_{212} | — | September 30, 2005 | Mount Lemmon | Mount Lemmon Survey | · | 1.9 km | MPC · JPL |
| 757923 | 2005 ST_{226} | — | September 30, 2005 | Kitt Peak | Spacewatch | · | 1.4 km | MPC · JPL |
| 757924 | 2005 SU_{229} | — | September 30, 2005 | Mount Lemmon | Mount Lemmon Survey | MAS | 450 m | MPC · JPL |
| 757925 | 2005 SW_{237} | — | September 29, 2005 | Kitt Peak | Spacewatch | · | 1.2 km | MPC · JPL |
| 757926 | 2005 SO_{241} | — | September 30, 2005 | Kitt Peak | Spacewatch | · | 1.3 km | MPC · JPL |
| 757927 | 2005 SG_{242} | — | September 30, 2005 | Kitt Peak | Spacewatch | · | 1.0 km | MPC · JPL |
| 757928 | 2005 SP_{268} | — | September 24, 2005 | Kitt Peak | Spacewatch | AGN | 910 m | MPC · JPL |
| 757929 | 2005 ST_{276} | — | September 30, 2005 | Kitt Peak | Spacewatch | · | 2.2 km | MPC · JPL |
| 757930 | 2005 SW_{290} | — | September 26, 2005 | Kitt Peak | Spacewatch | NYS | 730 m | MPC · JPL |
| 757931 | 2005 SW_{291} | — | September 27, 2005 | Kitt Peak | Spacewatch | · | 1.9 km | MPC · JPL |
| 757932 | 2005 SG_{292} | — | September 29, 2005 | Kitt Peak | Spacewatch | MRX | 680 m | MPC · JPL |
| 757933 | 2005 SV_{295} | — | April 24, 2015 | Haleakala | Pan-STARRS 1 | · | 2.9 km | MPC · JPL |
| 757934 | 2005 SS_{298} | — | September 24, 2005 | Kitt Peak | Spacewatch | · | 1.4 km | MPC · JPL |
| 757935 | 2005 SP_{301} | — | September 27, 2005 | Kitt Peak | Spacewatch | · | 870 m | MPC · JPL |
| 757936 | 2005 TB_{78} | — | September 14, 2005 | Kitt Peak | Spacewatch | · | 1.3 km | MPC · JPL |
| 757937 | 2005 TN_{89} | — | August 31, 2005 | Kitt Peak | Spacewatch | · | 1.4 km | MPC · JPL |
| 757938 | 2005 TO_{118} | — | October 7, 2005 | Kitt Peak | Spacewatch | MAS | 540 m | MPC · JPL |
| 757939 | 2005 TS_{118} | — | October 7, 2005 | Mount Lemmon | Mount Lemmon Survey | · | 550 m | MPC · JPL |
| 757940 | 2005 TV_{123} | — | October 7, 2005 | Mount Lemmon | Mount Lemmon Survey | · | 1.6 km | MPC · JPL |
| 757941 | 2005 TM_{126} | — | September 29, 2005 | Mount Lemmon | Mount Lemmon Survey | AGN | 820 m | MPC · JPL |
| 757942 | 2005 TS_{133} | — | October 9, 2005 | Kitt Peak | Spacewatch | AGN | 790 m | MPC · JPL |
| 757943 | 2005 TZ_{134} | — | October 1, 2005 | Mount Lemmon | Mount Lemmon Survey | · | 1.1 km | MPC · JPL |
| 757944 | 2005 TA_{139} | — | October 8, 2005 | Kitt Peak | Spacewatch | · | 1.3 km | MPC · JPL |
| 757945 | 2005 TX_{142} | — | September 29, 2005 | Kitt Peak | Spacewatch | · | 450 m | MPC · JPL |
| 757946 | 2005 TY_{145} | — | October 8, 2005 | Kitt Peak | Spacewatch | AGN | 900 m | MPC · JPL |
| 757947 | 2005 TP_{150} | — | October 8, 2005 | Kitt Peak | Spacewatch | · | 1.2 km | MPC · JPL |
| 757948 | 2005 TR_{155} | — | October 9, 2005 | Kitt Peak | Spacewatch | · | 900 m | MPC · JPL |
| 757949 | 2005 TU_{158} | — | October 9, 2005 | Kitt Peak | Spacewatch | · | 1.5 km | MPC · JPL |
| 757950 | 2005 TE_{161} | — | September 26, 2005 | Kitt Peak | Spacewatch | · | 1.4 km | MPC · JPL |
| 757951 | 2005 TN_{181} | — | October 1, 2005 | Kitt Peak | Spacewatch | MAS | 470 m | MPC · JPL |
| 757952 | 2005 TY_{198} | — | October 1, 2005 | Mount Lemmon | Mount Lemmon Survey | · | 1.3 km | MPC · JPL |
| 757953 | 2005 TW_{206} | — | October 9, 2005 | Kitt Peak | Spacewatch | · | 1.2 km | MPC · JPL |
| 757954 | 2005 TA_{207} | — | March 16, 2015 | Kitt Peak | Spacewatch | NYS | 900 m | MPC · JPL |
| 757955 | 2005 TL_{207} | — | November 12, 2010 | Mount Lemmon | Mount Lemmon Survey | GEF | 770 m | MPC · JPL |
| 757956 | 2005 TR_{207} | — | August 20, 2014 | Haleakala | Pan-STARRS 1 | AST | 1.2 km | MPC · JPL |
| 757957 | 2005 TV_{207} | — | April 1, 2017 | Haleakala | Pan-STARRS 1 | · | 1.6 km | MPC · JPL |
| 757958 | 2005 TJ_{208} | — | August 26, 2000 | Cerro Tololo | Deep Ecliptic Survey | · | 1.3 km | MPC · JPL |
| 757959 | 2005 TL_{208} | — | December 3, 2014 | Haleakala | Pan-STARRS 1 | BRA | 1.2 km | MPC · JPL |
| 757960 | 2005 TC_{211} | — | February 22, 2017 | Mount Lemmon | Mount Lemmon Survey | · | 1.5 km | MPC · JPL |
| 757961 | 2005 TU_{212} | — | September 25, 2014 | Mount Lemmon | Mount Lemmon Survey | · | 1.3 km | MPC · JPL |
| 757962 | 2005 TB_{214} | — | October 2, 2005 | Mount Lemmon | Mount Lemmon Survey | · | 1.3 km | MPC · JPL |
| 757963 | 2005 TO_{214} | — | October 1, 2005 | Mount Lemmon | Mount Lemmon Survey | · | 1.4 km | MPC · JPL |
| 757964 | 2005 TJ_{215} | — | October 1, 2005 | Kitt Peak | Spacewatch | MAS | 500 m | MPC · JPL |
| 757965 | 2005 TG_{217} | — | October 1, 2005 | Mount Lemmon | Mount Lemmon Survey | · | 1.5 km | MPC · JPL |
| 757966 | 2005 TR_{217} | — | October 13, 2005 | Kitt Peak | Spacewatch | · | 1.1 km | MPC · JPL |
| 757967 | 2005 TR_{218} | — | October 11, 2005 | Kitt Peak | Spacewatch | · | 1.4 km | MPC · JPL |
| 757968 | 2005 TV_{219} | — | October 11, 2005 | Kitt Peak | Spacewatch | · | 1.9 km | MPC · JPL |
| 757969 | 2005 TE_{220} | — | October 1, 2005 | Mount Lemmon | Mount Lemmon Survey | · | 1.3 km | MPC · JPL |
| 757970 | 2005 TO_{222} | — | October 7, 2005 | Mount Lemmon | Mount Lemmon Survey | (5) | 890 m | MPC · JPL |
| 757971 | 2005 UX_{4} | — | October 27, 2005 | Kitt Peak | Spacewatch | H | 350 m | MPC · JPL |
| 757972 | 2005 UH_{22} | — | October 10, 2005 | Kitt Peak | Spacewatch | · | 1.5 km | MPC · JPL |
| 757973 | 2005 UQ_{22} | — | October 5, 2005 | Kitt Peak | Spacewatch | NYS | 820 m | MPC · JPL |
| 757974 | 2005 UG_{23} | — | October 5, 2005 | Kitt Peak | Spacewatch | · | 1.8 km | MPC · JPL |
| 757975 | 2005 UN_{34} | — | October 24, 2005 | Kitt Peak | Spacewatch | HOF | 1.7 km | MPC · JPL |
| 757976 | 2005 UV_{34} | — | October 24, 2005 | Kitt Peak | Spacewatch | · | 1.6 km | MPC · JPL |
| 757977 | 2005 UR_{90} | — | October 22, 2005 | Kitt Peak | Spacewatch | · | 850 m | MPC · JPL |
| 757978 | 2005 UU_{90} | — | October 22, 2005 | Kitt Peak | Spacewatch | · | 1.5 km | MPC · JPL |
| 757979 | 2005 UV_{120} | — | October 24, 2005 | Kitt Peak | Spacewatch | · | 1.1 km | MPC · JPL |
| 757980 | 2005 UT_{121} | — | October 24, 2005 | Kitt Peak | Spacewatch | HOF | 1.8 km | MPC · JPL |
| 757981 | 2005 UF_{134} | — | October 25, 2005 | Kitt Peak | Spacewatch | · | 1.4 km | MPC · JPL |
| 757982 | 2005 UT_{135} | — | September 23, 2005 | Kitt Peak | Spacewatch | · | 1.6 km | MPC · JPL |
| 757983 | 2005 UX_{144} | — | October 26, 2005 | Kitt Peak | Spacewatch | MRX | 770 m | MPC · JPL |
| 757984 | 2005 UT_{151} | — | October 26, 2005 | Kitt Peak | Spacewatch | NYS | 810 m | MPC · JPL |
| 757985 | 2005 UB_{170} | — | October 24, 2005 | Kitt Peak | Spacewatch | · | 2.0 km | MPC · JPL |
| 757986 | 2005 UH_{178} | — | October 24, 2005 | Kitt Peak | Spacewatch | · | 1.4 km | MPC · JPL |
| 757987 | 2005 UD_{189} | — | October 27, 2005 | Mount Lemmon | Mount Lemmon Survey | KOR | 1.1 km | MPC · JPL |
| 757988 | 2005 UN_{194} | — | October 1, 2005 | Mount Lemmon | Mount Lemmon Survey | · | 1.5 km | MPC · JPL |
| 757989 | 2005 UX_{224} | — | October 25, 2005 | Kitt Peak | Spacewatch | · | 1.3 km | MPC · JPL |
| 757990 | 2005 UA_{241} | — | October 25, 2005 | Kitt Peak | Spacewatch | · | 2.8 km | MPC · JPL |
| 757991 | 2005 UQ_{246} | — | October 27, 2005 | Kitt Peak | Spacewatch | · | 820 m | MPC · JPL |
| 757992 | 2005 UE_{256} | — | October 25, 2005 | Kitt Peak | Spacewatch | · | 1.4 km | MPC · JPL |
| 757993 | 2005 UO_{263} | — | October 27, 2005 | Kitt Peak | Spacewatch | · | 1.1 km | MPC · JPL |
| 757994 | 2005 UX_{265} | — | October 27, 2005 | Kitt Peak | Spacewatch | AGN | 840 m | MPC · JPL |
| 757995 | 2005 UX_{266} | — | October 27, 2005 | Kitt Peak | Spacewatch | · | 1.4 km | MPC · JPL |
| 757996 | 2005 UQ_{267} | — | October 27, 2005 | Kitt Peak | Spacewatch | AGN | 850 m | MPC · JPL |
| 757997 | 2005 UF_{272} | — | October 28, 2005 | Kitt Peak | Spacewatch | · | 920 m | MPC · JPL |
| 757998 | 2005 UH_{284} | — | October 26, 2005 | Kitt Peak | Spacewatch | · | 1.2 km | MPC · JPL |
| 757999 | 2005 UR_{297} | — | October 26, 2005 | Kitt Peak | Spacewatch | · | 1.3 km | MPC · JPL |
| 758000 | 2005 UC_{301} | — | October 26, 2005 | Kitt Peak | Spacewatch | · | 2.7 km | MPC · JPL |

back to top

== Meaning of names ==
As minor planet discoveries are confirmed, they are given a permanent number by the IAU's Minor Planet Center (MPC), and the discoverers can then submit names for them, following the IAU's naming conventions. The list below concerns those minor planets in the specified number-range that have received names, and explains the meanings of those names.

Official naming citations of newly named small Solar System bodies are approved and published in a bulletin by IAU's Working Group for Small Bodies Nomenclature (WGSBN). Before May 2021, citations were published in MPC's Minor Planet Circulars for many decades. Recent citations can also be found on the JPL Small-Body Database (SBDB). Until his death in 2016, German astronomer Lutz D. Schmadel compiled these citations into the Dictionary of Minor Planet Names (DMP) and regularly updated the collection.

Based on Paul Herget's The Names of the Minor Planets, Schmadel also researched the unclear origin of numerous asteroids, most of which had been named prior to World War II. This article incorporates text from this source, which is in the public domain: SBDB New namings may only be added to this list below after official publication as the preannouncement of names is condemned. The WGSBN publishes a comprehensive guideline for the naming rules of non-cometary small Solar System bodies.

| Named minor planet | Provisional | This minor planet was named for... | Ref · Catalog |
|---|---|---|---|
| 757109 Donaldmoffatt | 2000 KB_{84} | John Donald Moffatt, Canadian former Public Educator at the Dominion Astrophysical Observatory of the Herzberg Astronomy and Astrophysics Institute of the National Research Council of Canada. | IAU · 757109 |
