= List of minor planets: 858001–859000 =

The following is a partial list of minor planets, running from minor-planet number 858001 through 859000, inclusive. The primary data for this and other partial lists is based on JPL's "Small-Body Orbital Elements" and data available from the Minor Planet Center. Critical list information is also provided by the MPC, unless otherwise specified from Lowell Observatory. A detailed description of the table's columns and additional sources are given on the main page including a complete list of every page in this series, and a statistical break-up on the dynamical classification of minor planets.

Also see the summary list of all named bodies in numerical and alphabetical order, and the corresponding naming citations for the number range of this particular list. New namings may only be added to this list after official publication, as the preannouncement of names is condemned by the Working Group for Small Bodies Nomenclature of the International Astronomical Union.

Near-Earth obj.	MBA (inner)	MBA (outer)	Centaur
Mars-crosser	MBA (middle)	Jupiter trojan	Trans-Neptunian obj.
Unclassified

== 858001–858100 ==
Designation			Discovery			Properties		Ref
Permanent	Provisional	Named after	Date	Site	Discoverer(s)	Category	Diam.	Ref
858001	2012 TZ_{371}	—	October 10, 2012	Mount Lemmon	Mount Lemmon Survey	NAE	1.7 km	MPC · JPL
858002	2012 TG_{372}	—	October 9, 2012	Mount Lemmon	Mount Lemmon Survey	·	980 m	MPC · JPL
858003	2012 TL_{372}	—	October 9, 2012	Haleakala	Pan-STARRS 1	·	1.1 km	MPC · JPL
858004	2012 TO_{372}	—	October 11, 2012	Haleakala	Pan-STARRS 1	·	1.1 km	MPC · JPL
858005	2012 TT_{373}	—	May 23, 2011	Mount Lemmon	Mount Lemmon Survey	·	1.2 km	MPC · JPL
858006	2012 TE_{374}	—	October 11, 2012	Haleakala	Pan-STARRS 1	·	390 m	MPC · JPL
858007	2012 TW_{374}	—	October 8, 2012	Mount Lemmon	Mount Lemmon Survey	·	450 m	MPC · JPL
858008	2012 TW_{377}	—	October 9, 2012	Haleakala	Pan-STARRS 1	·	1.3 km	MPC · JPL
858009	2012 TF_{381}	—	October 11, 2012	Haleakala	Pan-STARRS 1	·	1.2 km	MPC · JPL
858010	2012 TN_{382}	—	October 8, 2012	Kitt Peak	Spacewatch	·	1.3 km	MPC · JPL
858011	2012 TG_{383}	—	October 8, 2012	Haleakala	Pan-STARRS 1	·	1.1 km	MPC · JPL
858012	2012 TP_{383}	—	October 15, 2012	Haleakala	Pan-STARRS 1	·	980 m	MPC · JPL
858013	2012 TL_{384}	—	October 15, 2012	Haleakala	Pan-STARRS 1	·	990 m	MPC · JPL
858014	2012 TY_{384}	—	October 9, 2012	Haleakala	Pan-STARRS 1	·	1.1 km	MPC · JPL
858015	2012 TC_{385}	—	October 14, 2012	Catalina	CSS	(1547)	1.1 km	MPC · JPL
858016	2012 TJ_{386}	—	October 10, 2012	Mount Lemmon	Mount Lemmon Survey	L5	6.2 km	MPC · JPL
858017	2012 TY_{386}	—	September 24, 2008	Mount Lemmon	Mount Lemmon Survey	·	1.2 km	MPC · JPL
858018	2012 TC_{387}	—	October 8, 2012	Nogales	M. Schwartz, P. R. Holvorcem	·	1.1 km	MPC · JPL
858019	2012 TF_{387}	—	October 15, 2012	Kitt Peak	Spacewatch	·	1.0 km	MPC · JPL
858020	2012 TA_{388}	—	October 8, 2012	Haleakala	Pan-STARRS 1	·	900 m	MPC · JPL
858021	2012 TQ_{391}	—	October 9, 2012	Haleakala	Pan-STARRS 1	·	1.5 km	MPC · JPL
858022	2012 TW_{391}	—	October 11, 2012	Haleakala	Pan-STARRS 1	EOS	1.4 km	MPC · JPL
858023	2012 TH_{392}	—	October 8, 2012	Haleakala	Pan-STARRS 1	·	510 m	MPC · JPL
858024	2012 TD_{394}	—	October 15, 2012	Haleakala	Pan-STARRS 1	·	1.2 km	MPC · JPL
858025	2012 TD_{395}	—	October 11, 2012	Haleakala	Pan-STARRS 1	·	1.4 km	MPC · JPL
858026	2012 TG_{397}	—	October 5, 2012	Haleakala	Pan-STARRS 1	·	700 m	MPC · JPL
858027	2012 TH_{399}	—	October 10, 2012	Mount Lemmon	Mount Lemmon Survey	·	1.9 km	MPC · JPL
858028	2012 TB_{400}	—	October 6, 2012	Haleakala	Pan-STARRS 1	TIR	2.1 km	MPC · JPL
858029	2012 TP_{404}	—	October 9, 2012	Mount Lemmon	Mount Lemmon Survey	·	1.7 km	MPC · JPL
858030	2012 TL_{409}	—	October 8, 2012	Haleakala	Pan-STARRS 1	·	1.3 km	MPC · JPL
858031	2012 UW	—	September 18, 2012	Kitt Peak	Spacewatch	·	990 m	MPC · JPL
858032	2012 UF_{2}	—	October 8, 2012	Mount Lemmon	Mount Lemmon Survey	NYS	820 m	MPC · JPL
858033	2012 UY_{2}	—	October 8, 2012	Mount Lemmon	Mount Lemmon Survey	·	1.8 km	MPC · JPL
858034	2012 UK_{4}	—	October 8, 2012	Mount Lemmon	Mount Lemmon Survey	·	1.1 km	MPC · JPL
858035	2012 UE_{9}	—	October 16, 2012	Mount Lemmon	Mount Lemmon Survey	·	1.0 km	MPC · JPL
858036	2012 UN_{9}	—	September 18, 2012	Kitt Peak	Spacewatch	·	840 m	MPC · JPL
858037	2012 UA_{10}	—	October 8, 2012	Mount Lemmon	Mount Lemmon Survey	·	1.1 km	MPC · JPL
858038	2012 UC_{11}	—	September 18, 2003	Kitt Peak	Spacewatch	·	1.1 km	MPC · JPL
858039	2012 UZ_{11}	—	October 8, 2012	Mount Lemmon	Mount Lemmon Survey	·	910 m	MPC · JPL
858040	2012 UQ_{15}	—	September 18, 2003	Kitt Peak	Spacewatch	·	1.2 km	MPC · JPL
858041	2012 UC_{16}	—	October 16, 2012	Mount Lemmon	Mount Lemmon Survey	·	1.3 km	MPC · JPL
858042	2012 UB_{17}	—	September 27, 2003	Kitt Peak	Spacewatch	·	1.1 km	MPC · JPL
858043	2012 UA_{18}	—	October 16, 2012	La Sagra	OAM	·	760 m	MPC · JPL
858044	2012 UM_{20}	—	October 8, 2012	Mount Lemmon	Mount Lemmon Survey	·	1.2 km	MPC · JPL
858045	2012 UY_{23}	—	October 17, 2012	Mount Lemmon	Mount Lemmon Survey	H	340 m	MPC · JPL
858046	2012 UL_{27}	—	October 10, 2012	Mount Lemmon	Mount Lemmon Survey	JUN	950 m	MPC · JPL
858047	2012 UO_{27}	—	October 28, 1994	Kitt Peak	Spacewatch	PHO	560 m	MPC · JPL
858048	2012 UP_{28}	—	October 16, 2001	Kitt Peak	Spacewatch	·	710 m	MPC · JPL
858049	2012 UJ_{29}	—	October 5, 2012	Kitt Peak	Spacewatch	·	940 m	MPC · JPL
858050	2012 UU_{30}	—	October 8, 2012	Kitt Peak	Spacewatch	EUN	880 m	MPC · JPL
858051	2012 UK_{32}	—	October 8, 2012	Kitt Peak	Spacewatch	MAS	510 m	MPC · JPL
858052	2012 UK_{33}	—	October 8, 2012	Kitt Peak	Spacewatch	·	480 m	MPC · JPL
858053	2012 UN_{33}	—	October 18, 2012	Haleakala	Pan-STARRS 1	·	920 m	MPC · JPL
858054	2012 UW_{34}	—	October 6, 2012	Mount Lemmon	Mount Lemmon Survey	·	980 m	MPC · JPL
858055	2012 UC_{35}	—	October 16, 2012	Kitt Peak	Spacewatch	MAS	400 m	MPC · JPL
858056	2012 UC_{37}	—	October 16, 2012	Mount Lemmon	Mount Lemmon Survey	·	2.3 km	MPC · JPL
858057	2012 UW_{37}	—	October 16, 2012	Mount Lemmon	Mount Lemmon Survey	V	490 m	MPC · JPL
858058	2012 UJ_{39}	—	October 17, 2012	Kitt Peak	Spacewatch	·	2.7 km	MPC · JPL
858059	2012 UK_{40}	—	October 17, 2012	Haleakala	Pan-STARRS 1	·	3.1 km	MPC · JPL
858060	2012 UD_{41}	—	September 16, 2012	Kitt Peak	Spacewatch	·	1.4 km	MPC · JPL
858061	2012 UZ_{41}	—	October 5, 2012	Kitt Peak	Spacewatch	·	830 m	MPC · JPL
858062	2012 UM_{43}	—	October 17, 2012	Haleakala	Pan-STARRS 1	·	770 m	MPC · JPL
858063	2012 UQ_{43}	—	October 17, 2012	Mount Lemmon	Mount Lemmon Survey	·	1.3 km	MPC · JPL
858064	2012 UX_{43}	—	October 24, 2001	Palomar	NEAT	·	610 m	MPC · JPL
858065	2012 UG_{44}	—	October 18, 2012	Mount Lemmon	Mount Lemmon Survey	ADE	1.6 km	MPC · JPL
858066	2012 UP_{45}	—	October 5, 2012	Kitt Peak	Spacewatch	·	700 m	MPC · JPL
858067	2012 UY_{45}	—	November 5, 2007	Kitt Peak	Spacewatch	·	1.6 km	MPC · JPL
858068	2012 UQ_{46}	—	October 18, 2012	Haleakala	Pan-STARRS 1	·	1.0 km	MPC · JPL
858069	2012 UY_{46}	—	October 18, 2012	Haleakala	Pan-STARRS 1	·	430 m	MPC · JPL
858070	2012 UZ_{47}	—	October 18, 2012	Haleakala	Pan-STARRS 1	·	910 m	MPC · JPL
858071	2012 UL_{51}	—	September 6, 2008	Mount Lemmon	Mount Lemmon Survey	MAS	630 m	MPC · JPL
858072	2012 UV_{52}	—	October 19, 2012	Haleakala	Pan-STARRS 1	·	990 m	MPC · JPL
858073	2012 UF_{53}	—	October 19, 2012	Mount Lemmon	Mount Lemmon Survey	·	1.1 km	MPC · JPL
858074	2012 UM_{53}	—	October 16, 2012	Catalina	CSS	·	2.3 km	MPC · JPL
858075	2012 US_{57}	—	November 18, 2007	Mount Lemmon	Mount Lemmon Survey	·	1.6 km	MPC · JPL
858076	2012 UM_{58}	—	October 19, 2012	Haleakala	Pan-STARRS 1	·	450 m	MPC · JPL
858077	2012 UY_{58}	—	October 19, 2012	Haleakala	Pan-STARRS 1	·	1.1 km	MPC · JPL
858078	2012 UR_{60}	—	October 20, 2012	Kitt Peak	Spacewatch	·	490 m	MPC · JPL
858079	2012 UU_{61}	—	October 16, 2012	Mount Lemmon	Mount Lemmon Survey	·	1.4 km	MPC · JPL
858080	2012 UY_{64}	—	October 20, 2012	Kitt Peak	Spacewatch	·	720 m	MPC · JPL
858081	2012 UV_{66}	—	October 16, 2012	Kitt Peak	Spacewatch	·	1.0 km	MPC · JPL
858082	2012 UY_{66}	—	October 20, 2012	Kitt Peak	Spacewatch	·	400 m	MPC · JPL
858083	2012 UH_{67}	—	October 20, 2012	Haleakala	Pan-STARRS 1	·	540 m	MPC · JPL
858084	2012 UG_{71}	—	October 8, 2012	Haleakala	Pan-STARRS 1	·	750 m	MPC · JPL
858085	2012 UL_{71}	—	October 27, 2005	Mount Lemmon	Mount Lemmon Survey	·	780 m	MPC · JPL
858086	2012 UA_{73}	—	October 8, 2012	Haleakala	Pan-STARRS 1	H	330 m	MPC · JPL
858087	2012 UF_{79}	—	October 19, 2012	Haleakala	Pan-STARRS 1	·	1.1 km	MPC · JPL
858088	2012 UQ_{80}	—	October 6, 2012	Kitt Peak	Spacewatch	·	600 m	MPC · JPL
858089	2012 UJ_{81}	—	September 24, 2012	Mount Lemmon	Mount Lemmon Survey	·	1.7 km	MPC · JPL
858090	2012 UC_{82}	—	August 28, 2006	Kitt Peak	Spacewatch	·	1.8 km	MPC · JPL
858091	2012 UQ_{82}	—	October 20, 2012	Kitt Peak	Spacewatch	·	3.0 km	MPC · JPL
858092	2012 US_{88}	—	October 23, 2001	Socorro	LINEAR	MAS	640 m	MPC · JPL
858093	2012 UQ_{90}	—	October 9, 2012	Mount Lemmon	Mount Lemmon Survey	·	1.1 km	MPC · JPL
858094	2012 UM_{96}	—	October 17, 2012	Haleakala	Pan-STARRS 1	AGN	820 m	MPC · JPL
858095	2012 UL_{98}	—	October 10, 2012	Mount Lemmon	Mount Lemmon Survey	·	870 m	MPC · JPL
858096	2012 UQ_{99}	—	October 7, 2012	Kitt Peak	Spacewatch	·	1.1 km	MPC · JPL
858097	2012 UX_{100}	—	October 18, 2012	Haleakala	Pan-STARRS 1	·	1.4 km	MPC · JPL
858098	2012 UR_{101}	—	October 18, 2012	Haleakala	Pan-STARRS 1	·	1.5 km	MPC · JPL
858099	2012 UV_{101}	—	September 13, 2002	Palomar Mountain	NEAT	·	430 m	MPC · JPL
858100	2012 UV_{102}	—	October 18, 2012	Haleakala	Pan-STARRS 1	URS	2.2 km	MPC · JPL

== 858101–858200 ==
back to top

Designation			Discovery			Properties		Ref
Permanent	Provisional	Named after	Date	Site	Discoverer(s)	Category	Diam.	Ref
858101	2012 UC_{106}	—	April 9, 2003	Kitt Peak	Spacewatch	H	360 m	MPC · JPL
858102	2012 UB_{107}	—	October 19, 2012	Haleakala	Pan-STARRS 1	·	1.4 km	MPC · JPL
858103	2012 UE_{111}	—	September 18, 2012	Mount Lemmon	Mount Lemmon Survey	·	2.2 km	MPC · JPL
858104	2012 UC_{112}	—	September 30, 2005	Mount Lemmon	Mount Lemmon Survey	·	530 m	MPC · JPL
858105	2012 UM_{113}	—	December 5, 2005	Kitt Peak	Spacewatch	NYS	820 m	MPC · JPL
858106	2012 UQ_{114}	—	October 11, 2012	Haleakala	Pan-STARRS 1	·	940 m	MPC · JPL
858107	2012 UT_{115}	—	October 22, 2012	Mount Lemmon	Mount Lemmon Survey	·	1.1 km	MPC · JPL
858108	2012 UY_{115}	—	October 22, 2005	Kitt Peak	Spacewatch	·	640 m	MPC · JPL
858109	2012 UA_{116}	—	September 16, 2012	Kitt Peak	Spacewatch	·	850 m	MPC · JPL
858110	2012 UE_{116}	—	October 11, 2012	Haleakala	Pan-STARRS 1	·	1.5 km	MPC · JPL
858111	2012 UM_{116}	—	October 8, 2012	Catalina	CSS	·	2.1 km	MPC · JPL
858112	2012 UP_{116}	—	September 25, 2012	Mount Lemmon	Mount Lemmon Survey	·	1.2 km	MPC · JPL
858113	2012 UW_{116}	—	October 5, 2012	Kitt Peak	Spacewatch	·	1.5 km	MPC · JPL
858114	2012 UV_{117}	—	October 22, 2012	Mount Lemmon	Mount Lemmon Survey	HNS	710 m	MPC · JPL
858115	2012 UZ_{117}	—	October 22, 2012	Mount Lemmon	Mount Lemmon Survey	·	480 m	MPC · JPL
858116	2012 UF_{118}	—	October 14, 2012	Kitt Peak	Spacewatch	H	320 m	MPC · JPL
858117	2012 UN_{118}	—	October 14, 2012	Kitt Peak	Spacewatch	·	840 m	MPC · JPL
858118	2012 UP_{118}	—	October 22, 2012	Mount Lemmon	Mount Lemmon Survey	·	410 m	MPC · JPL
858119	2012 UW_{118}	—	November 20, 2001	Kitt Peak	Spacewatch	·	2.0 km	MPC · JPL
858120	2012 UH_{123}	—	October 14, 2012	Kitt Peak	Spacewatch	·	410 m	MPC · JPL
858121	2012 UR_{123}	—	October 16, 2007	Kitt Peak	Spacewatch	·	1.2 km	MPC · JPL
858122	2012 UC_{124}	—	October 22, 2012	Haleakala	Pan-STARRS 1	HNS	820 m	MPC · JPL
858123	2012 UC_{125}	—	October 22, 2012	Haleakala	Pan-STARRS 1	H	400 m	MPC · JPL
858124	2012 UH_{127}	—	November 20, 2003	Socorro	LINEAR	·	1.3 km	MPC · JPL
858125	2012 UP_{128}	—	October 31, 2008	Mount Lemmon	Mount Lemmon Survey	JUN	660 m	MPC · JPL
858126	2012 UX_{130}	—	October 16, 2012	Kitt Peak	Spacewatch	T_{j} (2.96) · 3:2	4.3 km	MPC · JPL
858127	2012 UB_{131}	—	October 6, 2012	Catalina	CSS	·	870 m	MPC · JPL
858128	2012 UM_{131}	—	October 16, 2012	Catalina	CSS	·	1.2 km	MPC · JPL
858129	2012 UC_{136}	—	October 10, 2012	Kitt Peak	Spacewatch	·	840 m	MPC · JPL
858130	2012 US_{136}	—	October 21, 2012	Mount Lemmon	Mount Lemmon Survey	T_{j} (1.67) · APO +1km	4.0 km	MPC · JPL
858131	2012 UD_{138}	—	October 8, 2012	Mount Lemmon	Mount Lemmon Survey	MIS	2.0 km	MPC · JPL
858132	2012 UG_{140}	—	October 18, 2012	Haleakala	Pan-STARRS 1	·	1.6 km	MPC · JPL
858133	2012 UT_{140}	—	October 10, 2012	Mount Lemmon	Mount Lemmon Survey	EOS	1.2 km	MPC · JPL
858134	2012 UF_{143}	—	October 8, 2012	Haleakala	Pan-STARRS 1	·	890 m	MPC · JPL
858135	2012 UP_{144}	—	October 18, 2012	Haleakala	Pan-STARRS 1	MRX	700 m	MPC · JPL
858136	2012 UA_{145}	—	September 29, 2008	Mount Lemmon	Mount Lemmon Survey	·	1.1 km	MPC · JPL
858137	2012 UT_{145}	—	October 18, 2012	Haleakala	Pan-STARRS 1	H	400 m	MPC · JPL
858138	2012 UU_{145}	—	October 18, 2012	Haleakala	Pan-STARRS 1	·	410 m	MPC · JPL
858139	2012 UQ_{146}	—	October 11, 2012	Kitt Peak	Spacewatch	·	1.1 km	MPC · JPL
858140	2012 UF_{147}	—	October 19, 2012	Haleakala	Pan-STARRS 1	NYS	740 m	MPC · JPL
858141	2012 UT_{148}	—	September 16, 2012	Mount Lemmon	Mount Lemmon Survey	·	2.0 km	MPC · JPL
858142	2012 UP_{157}	—	September 21, 2012	Mount Lemmon	Mount Lemmon Survey	·	1.0 km	MPC · JPL
858143	2012 US_{159}	—	October 6, 2012	Catalina	CSS	·	1.8 km	MPC · JPL
858144	2012 UC_{162}	—	October 22, 2012	Mount Lemmon	Mount Lemmon Survey	·	1.4 km	MPC · JPL
858145	2012 UN_{162}	—	October 22, 2012	Kitt Peak	Spacewatch	NYS	700 m	MPC · JPL
858146	2012 UM_{163}	—	October 25, 2003	Kitt Peak	Spacewatch	·	1.1 km	MPC · JPL
858147	2012 UT_{163}	—	October 21, 2012	Catalina	CSS	·	1.2 km	MPC · JPL
858148	2012 UY_{165}	—	October 13, 2012	Kitt Peak	Spacewatch	·	1.1 km	MPC · JPL
858149	2012 UD_{167}	—	October 10, 2012	Haleakala	Pan-STARRS 1	·	1.3 km	MPC · JPL
858150	2012 UO_{173}	—	October 26, 2012	Mount Lemmon	Mount Lemmon Survey	EUN	770 m	MPC · JPL
858151	2012 UQ_{173}	—	October 15, 2012	Mount Lemmon	Mount Lemmon Survey	·	570 m	MPC · JPL
858152	2012 UY_{174}	—	October 23, 2012	Haleakala	Pan-STARRS 1	centaur	10 km	MPC · JPL
858153	2012 UU_{175}	—	October 20, 2012	La Silla	La Silla	·	420 m	MPC · JPL
858154	2012 UJ_{176}	—	October 18, 2012	Haleakala	Pan-STARRS 1	·	2.0 km	MPC · JPL
858155	2012 UW_{178}	—	December 11, 2001	Socorro	LINEAR	T_{j} (2.97)	2.5 km	MPC · JPL
858156	2012 US_{179}	—	October 18, 2012	Haleakala	Pan-STARRS 1	EUN	920 m	MPC · JPL
858157	2012 UM_{181}	—	October 18, 2012	Haleakala	Pan-STARRS 1	AGN	950 m	MPC · JPL
858158	2012 UK_{182}	—	June 4, 2011	Mount Lemmon	Mount Lemmon Survey	ADE	1.6 km	MPC · JPL
858159	2012 UR_{185}	—	August 3, 2016	Haleakala	Pan-STARRS 1	·	1.5 km	MPC · JPL
858160	2012 UM_{186}	—	October 21, 2012	Haleakala	Pan-STARRS 1	HNS	1.1 km	MPC · JPL
858161	2012 UY_{186}	—	October 22, 2012	Haleakala	Pan-STARRS 1	·	1.5 km	MPC · JPL
858162	2012 UZ_{186}	—	October 21, 2012	Haleakala	Pan-STARRS 1	·	1.9 km	MPC · JPL
858163	2012 US_{187}	—	October 20, 2012	Haleakala	Pan-STARRS 1	EOS	1.4 km	MPC · JPL
858164	2012 UP_{188}	—	October 17, 2012	Haleakala	Pan-STARRS 1	·	890 m	MPC · JPL
858165	2012 UM_{189}	—	October 16, 2012	Mount Lemmon	Mount Lemmon Survey	·	1.6 km	MPC · JPL
858166	2012 UU_{190}	—	October 22, 2012	Mount Lemmon	Mount Lemmon Survey	·	2.1 km	MPC · JPL
858167	2012 US_{191}	—	October 17, 2012	Haleakala	Pan-STARRS 1	·	1.2 km	MPC · JPL
858168	2012 UZ_{191}	—	October 18, 2012	Haleakala	Pan-STARRS 1	·	1.2 km	MPC · JPL
858169	2012 UA_{192}	—	October 22, 2012	Haleakala	Pan-STARRS 1	AEO	770 m	MPC · JPL
858170	2012 UC_{192}	—	October 21, 2012	Mount Lemmon	Mount Lemmon Survey	·	1.3 km	MPC · JPL
858171	2012 UU_{192}	—	October 21, 2012	Haleakala	Pan-STARRS 1	·	1.2 km	MPC · JPL
858172	2012 UB_{193}	—	September 23, 2003	Haleakala	NEAT	·	1.2 km	MPC · JPL
858173	2012 UT_{193}	—	October 1, 2003	Kitt Peak	Spacewatch	·	870 m	MPC · JPL
858174	2012 UV_{193}	—	October 20, 2012	Kitt Peak	Spacewatch	·	1.4 km	MPC · JPL
858175	2012 UX_{193}	—	October 20, 2012	Haleakala	Pan-STARRS 1	·	1.5 km	MPC · JPL
858176	2012 UA_{194}	—	October 22, 2012	Haleakala	Pan-STARRS 1	·	490 m	MPC · JPL
858177	2012 UD_{194}	—	October 26, 2012	Mount Lemmon	Mount Lemmon Survey	·	2.0 km	MPC · JPL
858178	2012 UQ_{194}	—	October 20, 2012	Haleakala	Pan-STARRS 1	JUN	660 m	MPC · JPL
858179	2012 UQ_{195}	—	October 21, 2012	Haleakala	Pan-STARRS 1	·	600 m	MPC · JPL
858180	2012 UD_{196}	—	October 18, 2012	Haleakala	Pan-STARRS 1	·	420 m	MPC · JPL
858181	2012 UL_{196}	—	October 18, 2012	Haleakala	Pan-STARRS 1	·	880 m	MPC · JPL
858182	2012 UP_{196}	—	October 22, 2012	Haleakala	Pan-STARRS 1	JUN	560 m	MPC · JPL
858183	2012 UJ_{197}	—	September 19, 2003	Kitt Peak	Spacewatch	·	1 km	MPC · JPL
858184	2012 UA_{198}	—	October 18, 2012	Haleakala	Pan-STARRS 1	·	1.3 km	MPC · JPL
858185	2012 UC_{198}	—	November 16, 2003	Kitt Peak	Spacewatch	·	1.2 km	MPC · JPL
858186	2012 UJ_{198}	—	October 17, 2012	Haleakala	Pan-STARRS 1	·	440 m	MPC · JPL
858187	2012 UN_{198}	—	October 17, 2012	Mount Lemmon	Mount Lemmon Survey	·	2.2 km	MPC · JPL
858188	2012 UM_{199}	—	October 18, 2012	Haleakala	Pan-STARRS 1	·	960 m	MPC · JPL
858189	2012 UU_{199}	—	October 22, 2012	Haleakala	Pan-STARRS 1	H	490 m	MPC · JPL
858190	2012 UE_{200}	—	October 21, 2012	Haleakala	Pan-STARRS 1	H	430 m	MPC · JPL
858191	2012 UP_{200}	—	October 19, 2012	Mount Lemmon	Mount Lemmon Survey	·	1.8 km	MPC · JPL
858192	2012 UR_{201}	—	October 18, 2012	Haleakala	Pan-STARRS 1	ADE	1.5 km	MPC · JPL
858193	2012 UV_{201}	—	October 16, 2012	Kitt Peak	Spacewatch	·	2.2 km	MPC · JPL
858194	2012 UZ_{201}	—	October 22, 2012	Haleakala	Pan-STARRS 1	·	1.5 km	MPC · JPL
858195	2012 UX_{202}	—	October 18, 2012	Haleakala	Pan-STARRS 1	HYG	1.9 km	MPC · JPL
858196	2012 UM_{203}	—	February 23, 2018	Mount Lemmon	Mount Lemmon Survey	·	870 m	MPC · JPL
858197	2012 US_{203}	—	October 22, 2012	Haleakala	Pan-STARRS 1	HNS	800 m	MPC · JPL
858198	2012 US_{204}	—	October 22, 2012	Haleakala	Pan-STARRS 1	·	1.1 km	MPC · JPL
858199	2012 UX_{204}	—	October 19, 2012	Catalina	CSS	·	2.5 km	MPC · JPL
858200	2012 UW_{205}	—	July 13, 2015	Haleakala	Pan-STARRS 1	·	790 m	MPC · JPL

== 858201–858300 ==
back to top

Designation			Discovery			Properties		Ref
Permanent	Provisional	Named after	Date	Site	Discoverer(s)	Category	Diam.	Ref
858201	2012 UV_{206}	—	October 23, 2012	Kitt Peak	Spacewatch	·	1.1 km	MPC · JPL
858202	2012 UC_{207}	—	October 18, 2012	Haleakala	Pan-STARRS 1	·	850 m	MPC · JPL
858203	2012 UJ_{207}	—	October 16, 2012	Mount Lemmon	Mount Lemmon Survey	HNS	770 m	MPC · JPL
858204	2012 UO_{208}	—	October 22, 2012	Haleakala	Pan-STARRS 1	·	390 m	MPC · JPL
858205	2012 UN_{209}	—	October 17, 2012	Mount Lemmon	Mount Lemmon Survey	·	1.1 km	MPC · JPL
858206	2012 UU_{209}	—	October 21, 2012	Haleakala	Pan-STARRS 1	·	1.5 km	MPC · JPL
858207	2012 UX_{209}	—	October 17, 2012	Mount Lemmon	Mount Lemmon Survey	·	2.2 km	MPC · JPL
858208	2012 UC_{211}	—	October 18, 2012	Mount Lemmon	Mount Lemmon Survey	·	2.2 km	MPC · JPL
858209	2012 UX_{211}	—	October 16, 2012	Mount Lemmon	Mount Lemmon Survey	·	1 km	MPC · JPL
858210	2012 UH_{213}	—	October 18, 2012	Haleakala	Pan-STARRS 1	·	1.0 km	MPC · JPL
858211	2012 UU_{213}	—	October 22, 2012	Haleakala	Pan-STARRS 1	·	2.0 km	MPC · JPL
858212	2012 UY_{213}	—	October 22, 2012	Haleakala	Pan-STARRS 1	·	750 m	MPC · JPL
858213	2012 UL_{214}	—	October 18, 2012	Haleakala	Pan-STARRS 1	KOR	950 m	MPC · JPL
858214	2012 US_{214}	—	October 18, 2012	Haleakala	Pan-STARRS 1	·	1.2 km	MPC · JPL
858215	2012 UM_{215}	—	October 18, 2012	Haleakala	Pan-STARRS 1	·	1.1 km	MPC · JPL
858216	2012 UE_{216}	—	October 22, 2012	Haleakala	Pan-STARRS 1	·	1.1 km	MPC · JPL
858217	2012 UH_{216}	—	October 18, 2012	Haleakala	Pan-STARRS 1	·	330 m	MPC · JPL
858218	2012 US_{216}	—	October 19, 2012	Mount Lemmon	Mount Lemmon Survey	·	850 m	MPC · JPL
858219	2012 UT_{216}	—	October 22, 2012	Haleakala	Pan-STARRS 1	·	1.3 km	MPC · JPL
858220	2012 UA_{217}	—	October 23, 2012	Kitt Peak	Spacewatch	·	1.0 km	MPC · JPL
858221	2012 UD_{217}	—	October 21, 2012	Kitt Peak	Spacewatch	·	1.2 km	MPC · JPL
858222	2012 UG_{217}	—	October 17, 2012	Mount Lemmon	Mount Lemmon Survey	·	1.1 km	MPC · JPL
858223	2012 UJ_{217}	—	July 7, 2016	Mount Lemmon	Mount Lemmon Survey	·	1.2 km	MPC · JPL
858224	2012 UR_{217}	—	October 19, 2012	Mount Lemmon	Mount Lemmon Survey	·	1.1 km	MPC · JPL
858225	2012 UK_{218}	—	October 18, 2012	Haleakala	Pan-STARRS 1	·	900 m	MPC · JPL
858226	2012 UM_{218}	—	October 23, 2012	Haleakala	Pan-STARRS 1	EOS	1.3 km	MPC · JPL
858227	2012 UT_{218}	—	October 21, 2012	Haleakala	Pan-STARRS 1	·	1.6 km	MPC · JPL
858228	2012 UV_{218}	—	October 16, 2012	Mount Lemmon	Mount Lemmon Survey	·	1.2 km	MPC · JPL
858229	2012 UD_{219}	—	October 21, 2012	Mount Lemmon	Mount Lemmon Survey	·	880 m	MPC · JPL
858230	2012 UE_{219}	—	October 22, 2012	Haleakala	Pan-STARRS 1	WIT	700 m	MPC · JPL
858231	2012 US_{219}	—	October 18, 2012	Haleakala	Pan-STARRS 1	·	890 m	MPC · JPL
858232	2012 UE_{220}	—	October 21, 2012	Haleakala	Pan-STARRS 1	·	420 m	MPC · JPL
858233	2012 UH_{222}	—	October 16, 2012	Mount Lemmon	Mount Lemmon Survey	·	1.1 km	MPC · JPL
858234	2012 UW_{223}	—	October 21, 2012	Haleakala	Pan-STARRS 1	·	930 m	MPC · JPL
858235	2012 UY_{223}	—	October 21, 2012	Mount Lemmon	Mount Lemmon Survey	·	1.3 km	MPC · JPL
858236	2012 UX_{224}	—	December 20, 2008	La Sagra	OAM	·	1.2 km	MPC · JPL
858237	2012 UQ_{225}	—	October 20, 2012	Mayhill-ISON	L. Elenin	·	550 m	MPC · JPL
858238	2012 UW_{225}	—	October 20, 2012	Kitt Peak	Spacewatch	·	870 m	MPC · JPL
858239	2012 UX_{226}	—	October 23, 2012	Mount Lemmon	Mount Lemmon Survey	H	320 m	MPC · JPL
858240	2012 UA_{227}	—	October 18, 2012	Haleakala	Pan-STARRS 1	·	1.0 km	MPC · JPL
858241	2012 UC_{227}	—	October 18, 2012	Haleakala	Pan-STARRS 1	·	1.1 km	MPC · JPL
858242	2012 UK_{227}	—	October 18, 2012	Haleakala	Pan-STARRS 1	H	330 m	MPC · JPL
858243	2012 UL_{227}	—	October 21, 2012	Haleakala	Pan-STARRS 1	KON	1.5 km	MPC · JPL
858244	2012 UD_{229}	—	October 17, 2012	Haleakala	Pan-STARRS 1	·	2.3 km	MPC · JPL
858245	2012 UX_{229}	—	October 18, 2012	Haleakala	Pan-STARRS 1	·	580 m	MPC · JPL
858246	2012 UG_{231}	—	October 22, 2012	Haleakala	Pan-STARRS 1	·	480 m	MPC · JPL
858247	2012 UU_{232}	—	October 18, 2012	Haleakala	Pan-STARRS 1	·	1.0 km	MPC · JPL
858248	2012 UT_{233}	—	October 17, 2012	Mount Lemmon	Mount Lemmon Survey	·	1.6 km	MPC · JPL
858249	2012 UZ_{233}	—	October 17, 2012	Mount Lemmon	Mount Lemmon Survey	·	350 m	MPC · JPL
858250	2012 UB_{234}	—	October 18, 2012	Haleakala	Pan-STARRS 1	MAS	420 m	MPC · JPL
858251	2012 UH_{235}	—	October 18, 2012	Haleakala	Pan-STARRS 1	·	1.3 km	MPC · JPL
858252	2012 US_{237}	—	October 16, 2012	Mount Lemmon	Mount Lemmon Survey	GEF	830 m	MPC · JPL
858253	2012 UT_{238}	—	October 17, 2012	Haleakala	Pan-STARRS 1	HOF	1.7 km	MPC · JPL
858254	2012 UK_{239}	—	October 16, 2012	Mount Lemmon	Mount Lemmon Survey	·	1.3 km	MPC · JPL
858255	2012 UL_{239}	—	November 3, 2012	Haleakala	Pan-STARRS 1	·	1.1 km	MPC · JPL
858256	2012 UR_{240}	—	October 22, 2012	Kitt Peak	Spacewatch	·	1.0 km	MPC · JPL
858257	2012 UY_{240}	—	October 18, 2012	Haleakala	Pan-STARRS 1	·	1.2 km	MPC · JPL
858258	2012 UJ_{241}	—	October 18, 2012	Haleakala	Pan-STARRS 1	·	1.1 km	MPC · JPL
858259	2012 UL_{241}	—	October 18, 2012	Haleakala	Pan-STARRS 1	·	1.0 km	MPC · JPL
858260	2012 UT_{241}	—	October 19, 2003	Kitt Peak	Spacewatch	·	870 m	MPC · JPL
858261	2012 UV_{241}	—	October 22, 2012	Haleakala	Pan-STARRS 1	·	1.1 km	MPC · JPL
858262	2012 UZ_{241}	—	October 22, 2012	Haleakala	Pan-STARRS 1	·	1.2 km	MPC · JPL
858263	2012 UA_{242}	—	September 15, 2012	Catalina	CSS	JUN	690 m	MPC · JPL
858264	2012 UB_{242}	—	January 3, 2009	Kitt Peak	Spacewatch	·	1.4 km	MPC · JPL
858265	2012 UR_{243}	—	October 20, 2012	Mount Lemmon	Mount Lemmon Survey	(1547)	1.2 km	MPC · JPL
858266	2012 UZ_{243}	—	October 21, 2012	Haleakala	Pan-STARRS 1	·	1.2 km	MPC · JPL
858267	2012 UD_{244}	—	October 20, 2012	Haleakala	Pan-STARRS 1	·	1.1 km	MPC · JPL
858268	2012 UK_{245}	—	October 18, 2012	Haleakala	Pan-STARRS 1	·	970 m	MPC · JPL
858269	2012 UV_{245}	—	October 18, 2012	Mount Lemmon	Mount Lemmon Survey	EUN	840 m	MPC · JPL
858270	2012 UA_{248}	—	October 17, 2012	Mount Lemmon	Mount Lemmon Survey	·	2.4 km	MPC · JPL
858271	2012 UQ_{248}	—	October 16, 2012	Mount Lemmon	Mount Lemmon Survey	PHO	740 m	MPC · JPL
858272	2012 US_{252}	—	October 22, 2012	Haleakala	Pan-STARRS 1	·	360 m	MPC · JPL
858273	2012 UQ_{253}	—	October 17, 2012	Haleakala	Pan-STARRS 1	·	1.1 km	MPC · JPL
858274	2012 UR_{253}	—	October 16, 2012	Mount Lemmon	Mount Lemmon Survey	·	2.0 km	MPC · JPL
858275	2012 UG_{255}	—	October 17, 2012	Haleakala	Pan-STARRS 1	·	960 m	MPC · JPL
858276	2012 UM_{256}	—	October 18, 2012	Mount Lemmon	Mount Lemmon Survey	·	2.4 km	MPC · JPL
858277	2012 UR_{266}	—	October 21, 2012	Haleakala	Pan-STARRS 1	·	900 m	MPC · JPL
858278	2012 UK_{268}	—	October 17, 2012	Haleakala	Pan-STARRS 1	·	860 m	MPC · JPL
858279	2012 UT_{269}	—	October 22, 2012	Haleakala	Pan-STARRS 1	·	1.2 km	MPC · JPL
858280	2012 UW_{269}	—	October 17, 2012	Haleakala	Pan-STARRS 1	·	1.2 km	MPC · JPL
858281	2012 VD	—	December 2, 2008	Kitt Peak	Spacewatch	EUN	750 m	MPC · JPL
858282	2012 VQ_{1}	—	October 20, 2012	Mount Lemmon	Mount Lemmon Survey	H	400 m	MPC · JPL
858283	2012 VV_{1}	—	November 2, 2012	Haleakala	Pan-STARRS 1	H	310 m	MPC · JPL
858284	2012 VX_{1}	—	November 2, 2012	Haleakala	Pan-STARRS 1	H	370 m	MPC · JPL
858285	2012 VA_{4}	—	October 26, 2012	Mount Lemmon	Mount Lemmon Survey	·	1.9 km	MPC · JPL
858286	2012 VH_{4}	—	January 18, 2009	Kitt Peak	Spacewatch	·	1.2 km	MPC · JPL
858287	2012 VV_{4}	—	June 1, 2005	Mount Lemmon	Mount Lemmon Survey	·	720 m	MPC · JPL
858288	2012 VG_{11}	—	October 21, 2012	Kitt Peak	Spacewatch	·	770 m	MPC · JPL
858289	2012 VV_{13}	—	September 11, 2007	Kitt Peak	Spacewatch	AST	1.4 km	MPC · JPL
858290	2012 VL_{14}	—	November 30, 2005	Kitt Peak	Spacewatch	MAS	510 m	MPC · JPL
858291	2012 VT_{17}	—	January 18, 2009	Kitt Peak	Spacewatch	AEO	770 m	MPC · JPL
858292	2012 VL_{19}	—	November 6, 2012	Mount Lemmon	Mount Lemmon Survey	·	1.0 km	MPC · JPL
858293	2012 VL_{20}	—	September 7, 2008	Catalina	CSS	·	820 m	MPC · JPL
858294	2012 VH_{23}	—	November 4, 2012	Mount Lemmon	Mount Lemmon Survey	·	1.2 km	MPC · JPL
858295	2012 VZ_{23}	—	October 18, 2012	Haleakala	Pan-STARRS 1	·	1.1 km	MPC · JPL
858296	2012 VU_{26}	—	September 25, 2012	Mount Lemmon	Mount Lemmon Survey	·	1.1 km	MPC · JPL
858297	2012 VF_{27}	—	October 11, 2012	Haleakala	Pan-STARRS 1	·	880 m	MPC · JPL
858298	2012 VQ_{30}	—	October 11, 2012	Haleakala	Pan-STARRS 1	·	480 m	MPC · JPL
858299	2012 VR_{30}	—	October 14, 2012	Kitt Peak	Spacewatch	LIX	2.5 km	MPC · JPL
858300	2012 VM_{32}	—	October 17, 2012	Mount Lemmon	Mount Lemmon Survey	3:2	4.0 km	MPC · JPL

== 858301–858400 ==
back to top

Designation			Discovery			Properties		Ref
Permanent	Provisional	Named after	Date	Site	Discoverer(s)	Category	Diam.	Ref
858301	2012 VP_{36}	—	October 17, 2012	Mount Lemmon	Mount Lemmon Survey	·	1.4 km	MPC · JPL
858302	2012 VP_{38}	—	October 23, 2012	Catalina	CSS	·	1.6 km	MPC · JPL
858303	2012 VL_{40}	—	September 23, 2012	Mount Lemmon	Mount Lemmon Survey	·	1.1 km	MPC · JPL
858304	2012 VP_{40}	—	October 31, 2005	Mount Lemmon	Mount Lemmon Survey	·	810 m	MPC · JPL
858305	2012 VO_{41}	—	September 24, 2008	Kitt Peak	Spacewatch	·	1 km	MPC · JPL
858306	2012 VT_{41}	—	October 8, 2012	Kitt Peak	Spacewatch	·	1.0 km	MPC · JPL
858307	2012 VR_{44}	—	January 25, 2006	Kitt Peak	Spacewatch	·	680 m	MPC · JPL
858308	2012 VY_{45}	—	November 11, 2012	ESA OGS	ESA OGS	PHO	760 m	MPC · JPL
858309	2012 VO_{46}	—	October 14, 2012	Mayhill	Falla, N.	·	820 m	MPC · JPL
858310	2012 VL_{47}	—	October 8, 2012	Haleakala	Pan-STARRS 1	·	610 m	MPC · JPL
858311	2012 VZ_{48}	—	October 18, 2012	Haleakala	Pan-STARRS 1	·	1.2 km	MPC · JPL
858312	2012 VK_{49}	—	November 9, 2007	Kitt Peak	Spacewatch	·	1.0 km	MPC · JPL
858313	2012 VT_{52}	—	November 6, 2012	Mount Lemmon	Mount Lemmon Survey	·	860 m	MPC · JPL
858314	2012 VO_{53}	—	October 22, 2012	Haleakala	Pan-STARRS 1	MAR	700 m	MPC · JPL
858315	2012 VM_{56}	—	October 18, 2012	Haleakala	Pan-STARRS 1	3:2	2.8 km	MPC · JPL
858316	2012 VP_{58}	—	November 7, 2012	Haleakala	Pan-STARRS 1	·	1.1 km	MPC · JPL
858317	2012 VB_{59}	—	November 7, 2012	Haleakala	Pan-STARRS 1	·	1.0 km	MPC · JPL
858318	2012 VB_{61}	—	September 4, 2008	Kitt Peak	Spacewatch	MAS	540 m	MPC · JPL
858319	2012 VT_{61}	—	October 21, 2012	Haleakala	Pan-STARRS 1	·	1.1 km	MPC · JPL
858320	2012 VF_{62}	—	September 25, 2003	Palomar	NEAT	·	1.4 km	MPC · JPL
858321	2012 VV_{64}	—	September 17, 2012	Kitt Peak	Spacewatch	·	1.1 km	MPC · JPL
858322	2012 VT_{66}	—	November 29, 2005	Kitt Peak	Spacewatch	NYS	660 m	MPC · JPL
858323	2012 VM_{69}	—	October 21, 2012	Haleakala	Pan-STARRS 1	NYS	800 m	MPC · JPL
858324	2012 VD_{70}	—	November 24, 2008	Kitt Peak	Spacewatch	·	1.0 km	MPC · JPL
858325	2012 VC_{73}	—	November 12, 2001	Sacramento Peak	SDSS	·	1.6 km	MPC · JPL
858326	2012 VN_{73}	—	November 4, 2012	Kitt Peak	Spacewatch	MAS	540 m	MPC · JPL
858327	2012 VX_{75}	—	January 2, 2009	Mount Lemmon	Mount Lemmon Survey	·	1.1 km	MPC · JPL
858328	2012 VS_{77}	—	October 21, 2012	Haleakala	Pan-STARRS 1	·	1.4 km	MPC · JPL
858329	2012 VC_{78}	—	December 30, 2008	Kitt Peak	Spacewatch	·	1.2 km	MPC · JPL
858330	2012 VL_{79}	—	November 14, 2012	Mount Lemmon	Mount Lemmon Survey	·	1.2 km	MPC · JPL
858331	2012 VU_{81}	—	November 7, 2012	Haleakala	Pan-STARRS 1	H	330 m	MPC · JPL
858332 Grischun	2012 VW_{81}	Grischun	November 14, 2012	Falera	J. De Queiroz	·	2.3 km	MPC · JPL
858333	2012 VF_{84}	—	November 4, 2012	Kitt Peak	Spacewatch	·	980 m	MPC · JPL
858334 Gioacchinopecci	2012 VT_{87}	Gioacchinopecci	November 14, 2012	Mount Graham	K. Černis, R. P. Boyle	·	1.2 km	MPC · JPL
858335	2012 VJ_{89}	—	November 14, 2012	Kitt Peak	Spacewatch	·	1.2 km	MPC · JPL
858336	2012 VZ_{89}	—	October 21, 2012	Haleakala	Pan-STARRS 1	·	460 m	MPC · JPL
858337	2012 VR_{90}	—	October 9, 2012	Mount Lemmon	Mount Lemmon Survey	·	1.4 km	MPC · JPL
858338	2012 VN_{95}	—	November 13, 2012	Mount Lemmon	Mount Lemmon Survey	HNS	730 m	MPC · JPL
858339	2012 VN_{102}	—	August 19, 2006	Kitt Peak	Spacewatch	THM	1.6 km	MPC · JPL
858340	2012 VT_{103}	—	November 14, 2012	Kitt Peak	Spacewatch	·	840 m	MPC · JPL
858341	2012 VB_{105}	—	October 14, 2001	Kitt Peak	Spacewatch	·	880 m	MPC · JPL
858342	2012 VK_{106}	—	October 22, 2012	Haleakala	Pan-STARRS 1	·	2.1 km	MPC · JPL
858343	2012 VQ_{111}	—	October 23, 2012	Mount Lemmon	Mount Lemmon Survey	·	2.6 km	MPC · JPL
858344	2012 VF_{112}	—	October 22, 2012	Siding Spring	SSS	·	1.6 km	MPC · JPL
858345	2012 VU_{112}	—	October 1, 2005	Mount Lemmon	Mount Lemmon Survey	·	510 m	MPC · JPL
858346	2012 VY_{112}	—	January 30, 2006	Kitt Peak	Spacewatch	3:2	3.6 km	MPC · JPL
858347	2012 VJ_{113}	—	November 3, 2012	Haleakala	Pan-STARRS 1	·	540 m	MPC · JPL
858348	2012 VT_{118}	—	February 28, 2014	Haleakala	Pan-STARRS 1	·	1.0 km	MPC · JPL
858349	2012 VF_{119}	—	November 6, 2012	Mount Lemmon	Mount Lemmon Survey	·	2.0 km	MPC · JPL
858350	2012 VH_{119}	—	November 7, 2012	Mount Lemmon	Mount Lemmon Survey	ADE	1.4 km	MPC · JPL
858351	2012 VP_{119}	—	November 12, 2012	Mount Lemmon	Mount Lemmon Survey	·	2.2 km	MPC · JPL
858352	2012 VU_{119}	—	November 2, 2012	Mount Lemmon	Mount Lemmon Survey	·	1.9 km	MPC · JPL
858353	2012 VJ_{120}	—	November 6, 2012	Mount Lemmon	Mount Lemmon Survey	·	1.2 km	MPC · JPL
858354	2012 VN_{120}	—	January 10, 2014	Mount Lemmon	Mount Lemmon Survey	JUN	790 m	MPC · JPL
858355	2012 VB_{121}	—	November 7, 2012	Mount Lemmon	Mount Lemmon Survey	·	1.3 km	MPC · JPL
858356	2012 VO_{122}	—	December 23, 2017	Haleakala	Pan-STARRS 1	·	960 m	MPC · JPL
858357	2012 VZ_{122}	—	November 3, 2012	Mount Lemmon	Mount Lemmon Survey	·	1.9 km	MPC · JPL
858358	2012 VU_{123}	—	November 7, 2012	Mount Lemmon	Mount Lemmon Survey	·	1.2 km	MPC · JPL
858359	2012 VJ_{124}	—	November 4, 2012	Kitt Peak	Spacewatch	MAS	620 m	MPC · JPL
858360	2012 VY_{125}	—	February 26, 2015	Mount Lemmon	Mount Lemmon Survey	HYG	2.0 km	MPC · JPL
858361	2012 VL_{126}	—	October 17, 2012	Mount Lemmon	Mount Lemmon Survey	·	1.4 km	MPC · JPL
858362	2012 VV_{126}	—	November 7, 2012	Haleakala	Pan-STARRS 1	KOR	990 m	MPC · JPL
858363	2012 VQ_{127}	—	November 3, 2012	Mount Lemmon	Mount Lemmon Survey	·	1.1 km	MPC · JPL
858364	2012 VW_{128}	—	November 7, 2012	Mount Lemmon	Mount Lemmon Survey	AEO	780 m	MPC · JPL
858365	2012 VH_{130}	—	November 12, 2012	Mount Lemmon	Mount Lemmon Survey	·	990 m	MPC · JPL
858366	2012 VE_{131}	—	November 7, 2012	Mount Lemmon	Mount Lemmon Survey	·	1.2 km	MPC · JPL
858367	2012 VO_{133}	—	November 14, 2012	Kitt Peak	Spacewatch	MAS	450 m	MPC · JPL
858368	2012 VT_{134}	—	November 13, 2012	Mount Lemmon	Mount Lemmon Survey	·	1.1 km	MPC · JPL
858369	2012 VL_{135}	—	November 5, 2012	Kitt Peak	Spacewatch	·	1.1 km	MPC · JPL
858370	2012 VF_{136}	—	November 4, 2012	Mount Lemmon	Mount Lemmon Survey	·	1.3 km	MPC · JPL
858371	2012 VH_{136}	—	November 12, 2012	Mount Lemmon	Mount Lemmon Survey	AGN	870 m	MPC · JPL
858372	2012 VS_{138}	—	November 7, 2012	Mount Lemmon	Mount Lemmon Survey	·	1.2 km	MPC · JPL
858373	2012 VV_{138}	—	November 3, 2012	Mount Lemmon	Mount Lemmon Survey	WIT	590 m	MPC · JPL
858374	2012 VX_{138}	—	November 7, 2012	Mount Lemmon	Mount Lemmon Survey	·	1.3 km	MPC · JPL
858375	2012 VD_{139}	—	November 12, 2012	Haleakala	Pan-STARRS 1	·	1.2 km	MPC · JPL
858376	2012 VJ_{139}	—	November 7, 2012	Mount Lemmon	Mount Lemmon Survey	·	1.1 km	MPC · JPL
858377	2012 VL_{139}	—	November 13, 2012	Mount Lemmon	Mount Lemmon Survey	WIT	730 m	MPC · JPL
858378	2012 VP_{139}	—	November 12, 2012	Mount Lemmon	Mount Lemmon Survey	MRX	630 m	MPC · JPL
858379	2012 VS_{139}	—	November 13, 2012	Mount Lemmon	Mount Lemmon Survey	·	1.2 km	MPC · JPL
858380	2012 VW_{139}	—	November 13, 2012	Mount Lemmon	Mount Lemmon Survey	(1547)	1.1 km	MPC · JPL
858381	2012 VH_{140}	—	November 12, 2012	Haleakala	Pan-STARRS 1	·	920 m	MPC · JPL
858382	2012 VQ_{140}	—	November 7, 2012	Kitt Peak	Spacewatch	·	950 m	MPC · JPL
858383	2012 VV_{140}	—	November 14, 2012	Kitt Peak	Spacewatch	·	1.1 km	MPC · JPL
858384	2012 VD_{141}	—	November 12, 2012	Mount Lemmon	Mount Lemmon Survey	·	1.4 km	MPC · JPL
858385	2012 VE_{142}	—	October 22, 2012	Haleakala	Pan-STARRS 1	·	1.2 km	MPC · JPL
858386	2012 VV_{142}	—	November 12, 2012	Haleakala	Pan-STARRS 1	·	620 m	MPC · JPL
858387	2012 VY_{142}	—	November 4, 2012	Mount Lemmon	Mount Lemmon Survey	·	1.2 km	MPC · JPL
858388	2012 VC_{147}	—	November 8, 2012	Tincana	Zolnowski, M., Kusiak, M.	·	1.6 km	MPC · JPL
858389	2012 VY_{160}	—	November 7, 2012	Haleakala	Pan-STARRS 1	·	1.8 km	MPC · JPL
858390	2012 VA_{161}	—	November 7, 2012	Mount Lemmon	Mount Lemmon Survey	·	1.0 km	MPC · JPL
858391	2012 WE_{1}	—	November 17, 2012	Kitt Peak	Spacewatch	NYS	560 m	MPC · JPL
858392	2012 WV_{2}	—	November 1, 2005	Kitt Peak	Spacewatch	·	590 m	MPC · JPL
858393	2012 WE_{4}	—	October 18, 2012	Haleakala	Pan-STARRS 1	·	450 m	MPC · JPL
858394	2012 WH_{7}	—	October 22, 2012	Haleakala	Pan-STARRS 1	·	1.1 km	MPC · JPL
858395	2012 WM_{7}	—	October 9, 2012	Mount Lemmon	Mount Lemmon Survey	·	1.0 km	MPC · JPL
858396	2012 WE_{10}	—	January 7, 2006	Mauna Kea	P. A. Wiegert, D. D. Balam	T_{j} (2.96) · 3:2	4.1 km	MPC · JPL
858397	2012 WX_{13}	—	November 19, 2012	Kitt Peak	Spacewatch	·	1.4 km	MPC · JPL
858398	2012 WZ_{14}	—	October 17, 2012	Mount Lemmon	Mount Lemmon Survey	·	1.2 km	MPC · JPL
858399	2012 WD_{18}	—	November 13, 2012	Bergisch Gladbach	W. Bickel	·	480 m	MPC · JPL
858400	2012 WY_{19}	—	October 22, 2012	Mount Lemmon	Mount Lemmon Survey	·	400 m	MPC · JPL

== 858401–858500 ==
back to top

Designation			Discovery			Properties		Ref
Permanent	Provisional	Named after	Date	Site	Discoverer(s)	Category	Diam.	Ref
858401	2012 WU_{21}	—	November 20, 2001	Kitt Peak	Spacewatch	·	900 m	MPC · JPL
858402	2012 WJ_{22}	—	November 5, 2012	Kitt Peak	Spacewatch	·	1.5 km	MPC · JPL
858403	2012 WM_{22}	—	August 21, 2008	Kitt Peak	Spacewatch	MAS	570 m	MPC · JPL
858404	2012 WC_{24}	—	October 20, 2006	Kitt Peak	Spacewatch	LIX	2.4 km	MPC · JPL
858405	2012 WP_{24}	—	November 19, 2003	Socorro	LINEAR	·	1.5 km	MPC · JPL
858406	2012 WX_{28}	—	November 20, 2012	Nogales	M. Schwartz, P. R. Holvorcem	T_{j} (2.96)	2.6 km	MPC · JPL
858407	2012 WG_{30}	—	October 21, 2012	Kitt Peak	Spacewatch	NYS	710 m	MPC · JPL
858408	2012 WT_{30}	—	November 17, 2012	Mount Lemmon	Mount Lemmon Survey	·	1.1 km	MPC · JPL
858409	2012 WK_{33}	—	November 7, 2012	Mount Lemmon	Mount Lemmon Survey	·	480 m	MPC · JPL
858410	2012 WJ_{34}	—	November 26, 2012	Mount Lemmon	Mount Lemmon Survey	·	960 m	MPC · JPL
858411	2012 WM_{37}	—	November 27, 2012	Mount Lemmon	Mount Lemmon Survey	EOS	1.7 km	MPC · JPL
858412	2012 WX_{37}	—	November 23, 2012	Kitt Peak	Spacewatch	·	840 m	MPC · JPL
858413	2012 WG_{38}	—	November 17, 2012	Mount Lemmon	Mount Lemmon Survey	·	1.1 km	MPC · JPL
858414	2012 WL_{38}	—	December 22, 2012	Haleakala	Pan-STARRS 1	·	1.1 km	MPC · JPL
858415	2012 WN_{38}	—	November 19, 2012	Kitt Peak	Spacewatch	·	920 m	MPC · JPL
858416	2012 WS_{40}	—	November 19, 2012	Kitt Peak	Spacewatch	·	1.6 km	MPC · JPL
858417	2012 WG_{41}	—	November 24, 2012	Kitt Peak	Spacewatch	KOR	1.1 km	MPC · JPL
858418	2012 WN_{42}	—	November 23, 2012	Kitt Peak	Spacewatch	·	1.2 km	MPC · JPL
858419	2012 WB_{45}	—	November 23, 2012	Kitt Peak	Spacewatch	·	1.2 km	MPC · JPL
858420	2012 XD	—	November 14, 2012	Mount Lemmon	Mount Lemmon Survey	H	390 m	MPC · JPL
858421	2012 XY_{1}	—	December 3, 2012	Mount Lemmon	Mount Lemmon Survey	GEF	890 m	MPC · JPL
858422	2012 XA_{2}	—	November 12, 2012	Mount Lemmon	Mount Lemmon Survey	H	420 m	MPC · JPL
858423	2012 XD_{5}	—	December 4, 2012	Mount Lemmon	Mount Lemmon Survey	·	670 m	MPC · JPL
858424	2012 XB_{11}	—	October 20, 2012	Mount Lemmon	Mount Lemmon Survey	·	1.5 km	MPC · JPL
858425	2012 XH_{11}	—	September 18, 2012	Mount Lemmon	Mount Lemmon Survey	·	820 m	MPC · JPL
858426	2012 XA_{12}	—	October 22, 2012	Haleakala	Pan-STARRS 1	·	1.6 km	MPC · JPL
858427	2012 XG_{13}	—	January 15, 2009	Kitt Peak	Spacewatch	·	1.3 km	MPC · JPL
858428	2012 XF_{14}	—	December 5, 2012	Mount Lemmon	Mount Lemmon Survey	HOF	1.8 km	MPC · JPL
858429	2012 XS_{14}	—	December 5, 2012	Mount Lemmon	Mount Lemmon Survey	H	410 m	MPC · JPL
858430	2012 XA_{15}	—	January 23, 2006	Kitt Peak	Spacewatch	T_{j} (2.98) · 3:2	3.6 km	MPC · JPL
858431	2012 XB_{16}	—	December 5, 2012	Mount Lemmon	Mount Lemmon Survey	JUN	870 m	MPC · JPL
858432	2012 XP_{19}	—	November 6, 2012	Kitt Peak	Spacewatch	·	490 m	MPC · JPL
858433	2012 XW_{20}	—	December 2, 2012	Mount Lemmon	Mount Lemmon Survey	·	1.1 km	MPC · JPL
858434	2012 XE_{23}	—	December 3, 2012	Mount Lemmon	Mount Lemmon Survey	·	440 m	MPC · JPL
858435	2012 XB_{25}	—	October 19, 2012	Mount Lemmon	Mount Lemmon Survey	·	840 m	MPC · JPL
858436	2012 XY_{25}	—	December 3, 2012	Mount Lemmon	Mount Lemmon Survey	(5)	860 m	MPC · JPL
858437	2012 XX_{27}	—	November 12, 2012	Mount Lemmon	Mount Lemmon Survey	·	790 m	MPC · JPL
858438	2012 XA_{31}	—	April 17, 2010	Mount Lemmon	Mount Lemmon Survey	·	670 m	MPC · JPL
858439	2012 XQ_{31}	—	December 3, 2012	Mount Lemmon	Mount Lemmon Survey	·	1.0 km	MPC · JPL
858440	2012 XC_{32}	—	February 14, 2010	Mount Lemmon	Mount Lemmon Survey	·	440 m	MPC · JPL
858441	2012 XC_{33}	—	December 3, 2012	Mount Lemmon	Mount Lemmon Survey	(5)	820 m	MPC · JPL
858442	2012 XG_{34}	—	September 23, 2008	Kitt Peak	Spacewatch	·	930 m	MPC · JPL
858443	2012 XR_{35}	—	November 25, 2012	Kitt Peak	Spacewatch	AEO	840 m	MPC · JPL
858444	2012 XD_{44}	—	December 3, 2012	Mount Lemmon	Mount Lemmon Survey	·	2.4 km	MPC · JPL
858445	2012 XS_{44}	—	December 3, 2012	Mount Lemmon	Mount Lemmon Survey	EUN	880 m	MPC · JPL
858446	2012 XD_{46}	—	October 22, 2012	Haleakala	Pan-STARRS 1	·	1.4 km	MPC · JPL
858447	2012 XY_{47}	—	December 4, 2012	Kitt Peak	Spacewatch	·	600 m	MPC · JPL
858448	2012 XF_{49}	—	November 20, 2012	Mount Lemmon	Mount Lemmon Survey	·	1.4 km	MPC · JPL
858449	2012 XT_{50}	—	October 10, 2012	Nogales	M. Schwartz, P. R. Holvorcem	·	2.5 km	MPC · JPL
858450	2012 XU_{53}	—	December 7, 2012	Mount Lemmon	Mount Lemmon Survey	·	510 m	MPC · JPL
858451	2012 XR_{54}	—	December 8, 2012	Socorro	LINEAR	·	430 m	MPC · JPL
858452	2012 XZ_{54}	—	December 9, 2012	Haleakala	Pan-STARRS 1	H	360 m	MPC · JPL
858453	2012 XH_{56}	—	December 10, 2012	Haleakala	Pan-STARRS 1	H	390 m	MPC · JPL
858454	2012 XE_{57}	—	October 22, 2012	Haleakala	Pan-STARRS 1	·	760 m	MPC · JPL
858455	2012 XS_{58}	—	November 24, 2012	Kitt Peak	Spacewatch	·	1.1 km	MPC · JPL
858456	2012 XC_{62}	—	November 7, 2012	Mount Lemmon	Mount Lemmon Survey	·	1.2 km	MPC · JPL
858457	2012 XY_{63}	—	December 4, 2012	Mount Lemmon	Mount Lemmon Survey	DOR	1.6 km	MPC · JPL
858458	2012 XF_{64}	—	November 6, 2012	Mount Lemmon	Mount Lemmon Survey	H	300 m	MPC · JPL
858459	2012 XQ_{66}	—	December 4, 2012	Mount Lemmon	Mount Lemmon Survey	·	1.0 km	MPC · JPL
858460	2012 XR_{68}	—	December 5, 2012	Mount Lemmon	Mount Lemmon Survey	·	1.2 km	MPC · JPL
858461	2012 XS_{71}	—	November 7, 2012	Mount Lemmon	Mount Lemmon Survey	·	490 m	MPC · JPL
858462	2012 XD_{73}	—	December 31, 2008	Kitt Peak	Spacewatch	·	1.2 km	MPC · JPL
858463	2012 XL_{73}	—	November 12, 2012	Mount Lemmon	Mount Lemmon Survey	·	1.4 km	MPC · JPL
858464	2012 XU_{73}	—	December 6, 2012	Mount Lemmon	Mount Lemmon Survey	KOR	980 m	MPC · JPL
858465	2012 XF_{74}	—	December 6, 2012	Mount Lemmon	Mount Lemmon Survey	·	1.8 km	MPC · JPL
858466	2012 XW_{74}	—	September 7, 2008	Mount Lemmon	Mount Lemmon Survey	NYS	820 m	MPC · JPL
858467	2012 XK_{76}	—	December 6, 2012	Mount Lemmon	Mount Lemmon Survey	·	480 m	MPC · JPL
858468	2012 XV_{83}	—	December 6, 2012	Kitt Peak	Spacewatch	H	390 m	MPC · JPL
858469	2012 XL_{85}	—	December 7, 2012	Haleakala	Pan-STARRS 1	·	1.1 km	MPC · JPL
858470	2012 XO_{86}	—	September 10, 2007	Mount Lemmon	Mount Lemmon Survey	·	1.3 km	MPC · JPL
858471	2012 XR_{87}	—	September 20, 2008	Mount Lemmon	Mount Lemmon Survey	·	590 m	MPC · JPL
858472	2012 XL_{88}	—	September 27, 2002	Palomar	NEAT	·	460 m	MPC · JPL
858473	2012 XZ_{88}	—	November 12, 2012	Mount Lemmon	Mount Lemmon Survey	·	1.3 km	MPC · JPL
858474	2012 XQ_{91}	—	December 21, 2008	Kitt Peak	Spacewatch	·	820 m	MPC · JPL
858475	2012 XE_{92}	—	December 8, 2012	Mount Lemmon	Mount Lemmon Survey	·	590 m	MPC · JPL
858476	2012 XW_{93}	—	October 16, 2012	Kitt Peak	Spacewatch	·	500 m	MPC · JPL
858477	2012 XR_{96}	—	December 5, 2012	Mount Lemmon	Mount Lemmon Survey	·	490 m	MPC · JPL
858478	2012 XP_{97}	—	December 1, 2003	Kitt Peak	Spacewatch	·	1.1 km	MPC · JPL
858479	2012 XD_{99}	—	December 5, 2012	Mount Lemmon	Mount Lemmon Survey	·	570 m	MPC · JPL
858480	2012 XO_{100}	—	November 26, 2012	Mount Lemmon	Mount Lemmon Survey	·	1.6 km	MPC · JPL
858481	2012 XU_{102}	—	October 20, 2003	Kitt Peak	Spacewatch	·	1.2 km	MPC · JPL
858482	2012 XN_{103}	—	August 25, 2005	Palomar	NEAT	·	470 m	MPC · JPL
858483	2012 XZ_{107}	—	December 7, 1999	Socorro	LINEAR	·	1.3 km	MPC · JPL
858484	2012 XH_{109}	—	December 8, 2012	Mount Lemmon	Mount Lemmon Survey	·	550 m	MPC · JPL
858485	2012 XD_{110}	—	September 25, 2012	Mount Lemmon	Mount Lemmon Survey	·	1.4 km	MPC · JPL
858486	2012 XJ_{111}	—	January 28, 2000	Kitt Peak	Spacewatch	·	1.6 km	MPC · JPL
858487	2012 XZ_{118}	—	December 8, 2012	Mount Lemmon	Mount Lemmon Survey	·	430 m	MPC · JPL
858488	2012 XT_{120}	—	December 4, 2012	Mount Lemmon	Mount Lemmon Survey	·	1.1 km	MPC · JPL
858489	2012 XO_{121}	—	December 9, 2012	Haleakala	Pan-STARRS 1	·	760 m	MPC · JPL
858490	2012 XX_{121}	—	December 9, 2012	Haleakala	Pan-STARRS 1	·	1.1 km	MPC · JPL
858491	2012 XC_{126}	—	November 3, 2008	Kitt Peak	Spacewatch	·	1.1 km	MPC · JPL
858492	2012 XE_{126}	—	December 9, 2012	Les Engarouines	L. Bernasconi	·	600 m	MPC · JPL
858493	2012 XX_{126}	—	December 10, 2012	Haleakala	Pan-STARRS 1	·	1.4 km	MPC · JPL
858494	2012 XU_{130}	—	December 4, 2012	Mount Lemmon	Mount Lemmon Survey	·	1.2 km	MPC · JPL
858495	2012 XV_{131}	—	December 12, 2012	Mount Lemmon	Mount Lemmon Survey	·	1.6 km	MPC · JPL
858496	2012 XW_{139}	—	October 19, 2012	Mount Lemmon	Mount Lemmon Survey	·	1.7 km	MPC · JPL
858497	2012 XY_{140}	—	October 1, 2008	Kitt Peak	Spacewatch	·	700 m	MPC · JPL
858498	2012 XO_{142}	—	January 30, 2009	Kitt Peak	Spacewatch	·	1.0 km	MPC · JPL
858499	2012 XU_{142}	—	December 7, 2012	Haleakala	Pan-STARRS 1	PHO	800 m	MPC · JPL
858500	2012 XG_{143}	—	December 8, 2012	Mount Lemmon	Mount Lemmon Survey	·	1.3 km	MPC · JPL

== 858501–858600 ==
back to top

Designation			Discovery			Properties		Ref
Permanent	Provisional	Named after	Date	Site	Discoverer(s)	Category	Diam.	Ref
858501	2012 XR_{143}	—	November 19, 2012	Kitt Peak	Spacewatch	·	1.5 km	MPC · JPL
858502	2012 XW_{143}	—	November 25, 2012	Kitt Peak	Spacewatch	H	400 m	MPC · JPL
858503	2012 XL_{147}	—	December 3, 2012	Mount Lemmon	Mount Lemmon Survey	·	2.2 km	MPC · JPL
858504	2012 XT_{147}	—	November 14, 2012	Mount Lemmon	Mount Lemmon Survey	·	2.4 km	MPC · JPL
858505	2012 XU_{148}	—	September 28, 2003	Sacramento Peak	SDSS	EUN	880 m	MPC · JPL
858506	2012 XD_{149}	—	November 26, 2012	Mount Lemmon	Mount Lemmon Survey	·	2.4 km	MPC · JPL
858507	2012 XB_{150}	—	December 7, 2012	Haleakala	Pan-STARRS 1	H	530 m	MPC · JPL
858508	2012 XP_{153}	—	November 19, 2012	Siding Spring	SSS	·	1.3 km	MPC · JPL
858509	2012 XA_{155}	—	December 3, 2012	Mount Lemmon	Mount Lemmon Survey	H	410 m	MPC · JPL
858510	2012 XX_{155}	—	December 2, 2012	Mount Lemmon	Mount Lemmon Survey	·	1.3 km	MPC · JPL
858511	2012 XZ_{155}	—	December 3, 2012	Mayhill-ISON	L. Elenin	·	1.1 km	MPC · JPL
858512	2012 XE_{159}	—	December 8, 2012	Kitt Peak	Spacewatch	·	2.1 km	MPC · JPL
858513	2012 XW_{160}	—	June 8, 2016	Haleakala	Pan-STARRS 1	EOS	1.3 km	MPC · JPL
858514	2012 XN_{161}	—	December 3, 2012	Mount Lemmon	Mount Lemmon Survey	·	3.1 km	MPC · JPL
858515	2012 XW_{161}	—	May 11, 2015	Mount Lemmon	Mount Lemmon Survey	·	1.3 km	MPC · JPL
858516	2012 XP_{162}	—	September 22, 2016	Mount Lemmon	Mount Lemmon Survey	·	1.4 km	MPC · JPL
858517	2012 XR_{162}	—	December 5, 2012	Mount Lemmon	Mount Lemmon Survey	H	320 m	MPC · JPL
858518	2012 XW_{162}	—	December 8, 2012	Mount Lemmon	Mount Lemmon Survey	·	1.9 km	MPC · JPL
858519	2012 XH_{163}	—	December 10, 2012	Kitt Peak	Spacewatch	·	1.4 km	MPC · JPL
858520	2012 XQ_{163}	—	December 13, 2012	Mount Lemmon	Mount Lemmon Survey	·	1.5 km	MPC · JPL
858521	2012 XT_{163}	—	December 10, 2012	Mount Lemmon	Mount Lemmon Survey	·	840 m	MPC · JPL
858522	2012 XY_{163}	—	December 12, 2012	Mount Lemmon	Mount Lemmon Survey	·	2.0 km	MPC · JPL
858523	2012 XN_{164}	—	December 12, 2012	Mount Lemmon	Mount Lemmon Survey	JUN	640 m	MPC · JPL
858524	2012 XZ_{164}	—	December 8, 2012	Kitt Peak	Spacewatch	HNS	730 m	MPC · JPL
858525	2012 XJ_{166}	—	January 25, 2018	Mount Lemmon	Mount Lemmon Survey	·	1.4 km	MPC · JPL
858526	2012 XK_{166}	—	December 6, 2012	Mount Lemmon	Mount Lemmon Survey	·	1.0 km	MPC · JPL
858527	2012 XM_{166}	—	December 8, 2012	Mount Lemmon	Mount Lemmon Survey	T_{j} (2.97)	2.5 km	MPC · JPL
858528	2012 XE_{167}	—	April 4, 2014	Haleakala	Pan-STARRS 1	·	1.3 km	MPC · JPL
858529	2012 XK_{167}	—	January 9, 2018	Haleakala	Pan-STARRS 1	·	1.5 km	MPC · JPL
858530	2012 XM_{167}	—	April 14, 2016	Haleakala	Pan-STARRS 1	H	430 m	MPC · JPL
858531	2012 XP_{167}	—	December 8, 2012	Mount Lemmon	Mount Lemmon Survey	·	960 m	MPC · JPL
858532	2012 XQ_{167}	—	December 9, 2012	Nogales	M. Schwartz, P. R. Holvorcem	(1547)	1.4 km	MPC · JPL
858533	2012 XG_{168}	—	December 9, 2012	Mount Lemmon	Mount Lemmon Survey	PHO	680 m	MPC · JPL
858534	2012 XP_{168}	—	December 9, 2012	Haleakala	Pan-STARRS 1	·	1.9 km	MPC · JPL
858535	2012 XB_{169}	—	December 12, 2012	Kitt Peak	Spacewatch	·	500 m	MPC · JPL
858536	2012 XC_{169}	—	December 4, 2012	Mount Lemmon	Mount Lemmon Survey	·	900 m	MPC · JPL
858537	2012 XE_{169}	—	December 8, 2012	Mount Lemmon	Mount Lemmon Survey	·	550 m	MPC · JPL
858538	2012 XW_{169}	—	December 10, 2012	Haleakala	Pan-STARRS 1	JUN	780 m	MPC · JPL
858539	2012 XX_{169}	—	December 2, 2012	Mount Lemmon	Mount Lemmon Survey	·	1.4 km	MPC · JPL
858540	2012 XT_{170}	—	December 11, 2012	Mount Lemmon	Mount Lemmon Survey	·	1.7 km	MPC · JPL
858541	2012 XL_{171}	—	December 8, 2012	Kitt Peak	Spacewatch	·	1.6 km	MPC · JPL
858542	2012 XY_{171}	—	December 9, 2012	Haleakala	Pan-STARRS 1	·	1.1 km	MPC · JPL
858543	2012 XA_{172}	—	December 6, 2012	Mount Lemmon	Mount Lemmon Survey	·	1.1 km	MPC · JPL
858544	2012 XU_{173}	—	December 13, 2012	Mount Lemmon	Mount Lemmon Survey	·	920 m	MPC · JPL
858545	2012 XF_{175}	—	September 15, 2007	Mount Lemmon	Mount Lemmon Survey	·	1.3 km	MPC · JPL
858546	2012 XP_{177}	—	December 3, 2012	Mount Lemmon	Mount Lemmon Survey	·	1.3 km	MPC · JPL
858547	2012 XB_{178}	—	December 4, 2012	Kitt Peak	Spacewatch	·	1.4 km	MPC · JPL
858548	2012 XE_{179}	—	December 6, 2012	Mount Lemmon	Mount Lemmon Survey	·	970 m	MPC · JPL
858549	2012 XL_{180}	—	December 9, 2012	Mount Lemmon	Mount Lemmon Survey	(194)	1.4 km	MPC · JPL
858550	2012 XJ_{184}	—	February 13, 2009	Kitt Peak	Spacewatch	·	1.5 km	MPC · JPL
858551	2012 YL_{5}	—	February 4, 2009	Mount Lemmon	Mount Lemmon Survey	·	1.2 km	MPC · JPL
858552	2012 YM_{5}	—	December 22, 2012	Haleakala	Pan-STARRS 1	H	400 m	MPC · JPL
858553	2012 YC_{7}	—	December 10, 2012	Haleakala	Pan-STARRS 1	H	450 m	MPC · JPL
858554	2012 YZ_{7}	—	December 31, 2012	Haleakala	Pan-STARRS 1	·	1.0 km	MPC · JPL
858555	2012 YM_{8}	—	December 27, 2012	Haleakala	Pan-STARRS 1	H	490 m	MPC · JPL
858556	2012 YR_{8}	—	November 4, 2007	Mount Lemmon	Mount Lemmon Survey	·	1.8 km	MPC · JPL
858557	2012 YU_{9}	—	December 20, 2012	Mount Lemmon	Mount Lemmon Survey	·	1.1 km	MPC · JPL
858558	2012 YO_{11}	—	December 23, 2012	Haleakala	Pan-STARRS 1	·	1.5 km	MPC · JPL
858559	2012 YR_{11}	—	December 23, 2012	Haleakala	Pan-STARRS 1	·	1.1 km	MPC · JPL
858560	2012 YE_{12}	—	November 3, 2007	Mount Lemmon	Mount Lemmon Survey	·	1.1 km	MPC · JPL
858561	2012 YO_{12}	—	December 21, 2012	Mount Lemmon	Mount Lemmon Survey	·	1.5 km	MPC · JPL
858562	2012 YG_{13}	—	December 12, 2017	Haleakala	Pan-STARRS 1	·	1.3 km	MPC · JPL
858563	2012 YT_{13}	—	December 22, 2012	Haleakala	Pan-STARRS 1	·	1.4 km	MPC · JPL
858564	2012 YD_{14}	—	September 25, 2006	Catalina	CSS	·	2.0 km	MPC · JPL
858565	2012 YF_{14}	—	December 22, 2012	Haleakala	Pan-STARRS 1	JUN	620 m	MPC · JPL
858566	2012 YF_{15}	—	May 4, 2014	Mount Lemmon	Mount Lemmon Survey	·	860 m	MPC · JPL
858567	2012 YM_{15}	—	December 23, 2012	Haleakala	Pan-STARRS 1	·	1.6 km	MPC · JPL
858568	2012 YB_{16}	—	October 8, 2015	Haleakala	Pan-STARRS 1	·	610 m	MPC · JPL
858569	2012 YG_{17}	—	December 22, 2012	Haleakala	Pan-STARRS 1	·	1.5 km	MPC · JPL
858570	2012 YO_{18}	—	December 23, 2012	Haleakala	Pan-STARRS 1	AGN	790 m	MPC · JPL
858571	2012 YS_{18}	—	December 22, 2012	Haleakala	Pan-STARRS 1	·	1.3 km	MPC · JPL
858572	2012 YV_{18}	—	December 23, 2012	Haleakala	Pan-STARRS 1	·	690 m	MPC · JPL
858573	2012 YW_{18}	—	December 23, 2012	Haleakala	Pan-STARRS 1	·	1.1 km	MPC · JPL
858574	2012 YE_{19}	—	December 23, 2012	Haleakala	Pan-STARRS 1	·	500 m	MPC · JPL
858575	2012 YG_{19}	—	December 8, 2012	Mount Lemmon	Mount Lemmon Survey	·	1.1 km	MPC · JPL
858576	2012 YS_{19}	—	December 23, 2012	Haleakala	Pan-STARRS 1	·	450 m	MPC · JPL
858577	2012 YG_{20}	—	December 22, 2012	Haleakala	Pan-STARRS 1	·	1.2 km	MPC · JPL
858578	2012 YX_{20}	—	December 21, 2012	Mount Lemmon	Mount Lemmon Survey	·	1.3 km	MPC · JPL
858579	2012 YT_{21}	—	December 23, 2012	Haleakala	Pan-STARRS 1	·	1.3 km	MPC · JPL
858580	2012 YF_{22}	—	December 23, 2012	Haleakala	Pan-STARRS 1	·	730 m	MPC · JPL
858581	2012 YZ_{22}	—	November 7, 2012	Mount Lemmon	Mount Lemmon Survey	·	1.3 km	MPC · JPL
858582	2012 YJ_{23}	—	December 22, 2012	Haleakala	Pan-STARRS 1	·	810 m	MPC · JPL
858583	2012 YX_{23}	—	December 23, 2012	Haleakala	Pan-STARRS 1	·	2.2 km	MPC · JPL
858584	2012 YZ_{23}	—	December 23, 2012	Haleakala	Pan-STARRS 1	GAL	1.1 km	MPC · JPL
858585	2012 YN_{24}	—	December 22, 2012	Haleakala	Pan-STARRS 1	HNS	850 m	MPC · JPL
858586	2012 YV_{24}	—	December 22, 2012	Haleakala	Pan-STARRS 1	·	920 m	MPC · JPL
858587	2012 YV_{25}	—	December 23, 2012	Haleakala	Pan-STARRS 1	·	1.2 km	MPC · JPL
858588	2012 YX_{25}	—	October 8, 2008	Kitt Peak	Spacewatch	·	700 m	MPC · JPL
858589	2012 YM_{27}	—	October 15, 2007	Kitt Peak	Spacewatch	·	1.3 km	MPC · JPL
858590	2012 YN_{27}	—	December 23, 2012	Haleakala	Pan-STARRS 1	·	1.1 km	MPC · JPL
858591	2012 YP_{27}	—	December 23, 2012	Haleakala	Pan-STARRS 1	·	1.6 km	MPC · JPL
858592	2012 YU_{27}	—	December 23, 2012	Haleakala	Pan-STARRS 1	·	1.0 km	MPC · JPL
858593	2012 YG_{29}	—	December 23, 2012	Haleakala	Pan-STARRS 1	·	530 m	MPC · JPL
858594	2013 AT_{2}	—	December 8, 2012	Mount Lemmon	Mount Lemmon Survey	MAS	580 m	MPC · JPL
858595	2013 AJ_{3}	—	October 1, 2008	Mount Lemmon	Mount Lemmon Survey	MAS	490 m	MPC · JPL
858596	2013 AK_{5}	—	September 14, 2007	Mauna Kea	P. A. Wiegert	·	1.2 km	MPC · JPL
858597	2013 AN_{10}	—	January 4, 2013	Kitt Peak	Spacewatch	·	1.3 km	MPC · JPL
858598	2013 AG_{12}	—	October 20, 2012	Mount Lemmon	Mount Lemmon Survey	JUN	980 m	MPC · JPL
858599	2013 AK_{13}	—	January 3, 2013	Mount Lemmon	Mount Lemmon Survey	·	1.4 km	MPC · JPL
858600	2013 AX_{13}	—	February 9, 2008	Mount Lemmon	Mount Lemmon Survey	·	1.7 km	MPC · JPL

== 858601–858700 ==
back to top

Designation			Discovery			Properties		Ref
Permanent	Provisional	Named after	Date	Site	Discoverer(s)	Category	Diam.	Ref
858601	2013 AD_{16}	—	November 18, 2001	Kitt Peak	Spacewatch	·	1.5 km	MPC · JPL
858602	2013 AO_{18}	—	March 18, 2010	Kitt Peak	Spacewatch	·	480 m	MPC · JPL
858603	2013 AP_{18}	—	January 5, 2013	Mount Lemmon	Mount Lemmon Survey	·	480 m	MPC · JPL
858604	2013 AK_{19}	—	January 5, 2013	Mount Lemmon	Mount Lemmon Survey	·	1.2 km	MPC · JPL
858605	2013 AE_{20}	—	February 1, 2005	Kitt Peak	Spacewatch	·	1.4 km	MPC · JPL
858606	2013 AH_{20}	—	November 15, 2012	Mount Lemmon	Mount Lemmon Survey	H	460 m	MPC · JPL
858607	2013 AW_{20}	—	December 22, 2012	Haleakala	Pan-STARRS 1	H	440 m	MPC · JPL
858608	2013 AV_{25}	—	November 16, 2009	Mount Lemmon	Mount Lemmon Survey	·	530 m	MPC · JPL
858609	2013 AK_{26}	—	January 5, 2013	Mount Lemmon	Mount Lemmon Survey	·	1.4 km	MPC · JPL
858610	2013 AP_{27}	—	January 5, 2013	Mount Lemmon	Mount Lemmon Survey	AMO	470 m	MPC · JPL
858611	2013 AH_{30}	—	January 7, 2013	Mount Lemmon	Mount Lemmon Survey	·	520 m	MPC · JPL
858612	2013 AR_{34}	—	January 4, 2013	Mount Lemmon	Mount Lemmon Survey	·	380 m	MPC · JPL
858613	2013 AO_{38}	—	January 5, 2013	Kitt Peak	Spacewatch	(116763)	1.4 km	MPC · JPL
858614	2013 AK_{41}	—	January 5, 2013	Mount Lemmon	Mount Lemmon Survey	·	860 m	MPC · JPL
858615	2013 AL_{41}	—	January 5, 2013	Mount Lemmon	Mount Lemmon Survey	EUN	890 m	MPC · JPL
858616	2013 AY_{42}	—	January 5, 2013	Kitt Peak	Spacewatch	·	1.0 km	MPC · JPL
858617	2013 AA_{48}	—	January 25, 2009	Kitt Peak	Spacewatch	·	1.2 km	MPC · JPL
858618	2013 AG_{50}	—	January 8, 2013	Mount Lemmon	Mount Lemmon Survey	·	1.3 km	MPC · JPL
858619	2013 AX_{59}	—	January 7, 2013	Kitt Peak	Spacewatch	H	360 m	MPC · JPL
858620	2013 AQ_{60}	—	January 9, 2013	Mount Lemmon	Mount Lemmon Survey	APO	360 m	MPC · JPL
858621	2013 AF_{62}	—	December 22, 2012	Haleakala	Pan-STARRS 1	·	510 m	MPC · JPL
858622	2013 AV_{64}	—	January 10, 2013	Haleakala	Pan-STARRS 1	H	360 m	MPC · JPL
858623	2013 AH_{66}	—	January 6, 2013	Mount Lemmon	Mount Lemmon Survey	·	610 m	MPC · JPL
858624	2013 AN_{76}	—	January 14, 2013	Mount Lemmon	Mount Lemmon Survey	·	1.9 km	MPC · JPL
858625	2013 AR_{77}	—	December 23, 2012	Haleakala	Pan-STARRS 1	·	770 m	MPC · JPL
858626	2013 AL_{78}	—	October 25, 2005	Kitt Peak	Spacewatch	·	480 m	MPC · JPL
858627	2013 AS_{79}	—	January 10, 2013	Haleakala	Pan-STARRS 1	L4	5.5 km	MPC · JPL
858628	2013 AG_{80}	—	January 10, 2013	Haleakala	Pan-STARRS 1	·	1.4 km	MPC · JPL
858629	2013 AU_{82}	—	January 12, 2013	Mount Lemmon	Mount Lemmon Survey	·	490 m	MPC · JPL
858630	2013 AV_{84}	—	December 23, 2012	Haleakala	Pan-STARRS 1	·	1.1 km	MPC · JPL
858631	2013 AC_{85}	—	August 31, 2007	Siding Spring	K. Sárneczky, L. Kiss	·	850 m	MPC · JPL
858632	2013 AP_{92}	—	December 22, 2012	Haleakala	Pan-STARRS 1	·	1.5 km	MPC · JPL
858633	2013 AM_{93}	—	September 24, 2008	Mount Lemmon	Mount Lemmon Survey	·	870 m	MPC · JPL
858634	2013 AA_{95}	—	December 8, 2012	Kitt Peak	Spacewatch	·	1.6 km	MPC · JPL
858635	2013 AN_{96}	—	April 7, 2003	Kitt Peak	Spacewatch	·	1.4 km	MPC · JPL
858636	2013 AS_{97}	—	January 5, 2013	Kitt Peak	Spacewatch	·	520 m	MPC · JPL
858637	2013 AH_{100}	—	December 8, 2012	Kitt Peak	Spacewatch	TIR	2.2 km	MPC · JPL
858638	2013 AU_{101}	—	September 19, 2011	Mount Lemmon	Mount Lemmon Survey	·	1.4 km	MPC · JPL
858639	2013 AU_{104}	—	January 28, 2004	Kitt Peak	Spacewatch	·	1.3 km	MPC · JPL
858640	2013 AN_{105}	—	December 12, 2012	Kitt Peak	Spacewatch	H	360 m	MPC · JPL
858641	2013 AC_{110}	—	December 12, 2012	Kitt Peak	Spacewatch	H	300 m	MPC · JPL
858642	2013 AW_{119}	—	February 21, 2009	Catalina	CSS	·	1.3 km	MPC · JPL
858643	2013 AQ_{120}	—	March 24, 2009	Mount Lemmon	Mount Lemmon Survey	·	1.3 km	MPC · JPL
858644	2013 AP_{121}	—	January 5, 2013	Mount Lemmon	Mount Lemmon Survey	H	330 m	MPC · JPL
858645	2013 AY_{121}	—	January 14, 2013	ESA OGS	ESA OGS	·	910 m	MPC · JPL
858646	2013 AK_{123}	—	October 24, 2009	Kitt Peak	Spacewatch	L4	5.5 km	MPC · JPL
858647	2013 AF_{126}	—	January 3, 2013	Catalina	CSS	H	420 m	MPC · JPL
858648	2013 AU_{127}	—	January 5, 2013	Mount Lemmon	Mount Lemmon Survey	·	1.0 km	MPC · JPL
858649	2013 AR_{128}	—	January 10, 2013	Mount Lemmon	Mount Lemmon Survey	MAR	730 m	MPC · JPL
858650	2013 AL_{130}	—	January 15, 2013	ESA OGS	ESA OGS	·	1.2 km	MPC · JPL
858651	2013 AZ_{133}	—	September 21, 2007	XuYi	PMO NEO Survey Program	·	1.4 km	MPC · JPL
858652	2013 AB_{137}	—	January 10, 2013	Haleakala	Pan-STARRS 1	·	1.5 km	MPC · JPL
858653	2013 AX_{137}	—	October 27, 2008	Mount Lemmon	Mount Lemmon Survey	·	660 m	MPC · JPL
858654	2013 AL_{138}	—	January 4, 2013	Cerro Tololo	D. E. Trilling, R. L. Allen	L4	5.6 km	MPC · JPL
858655	2013 AK_{141}	—	October 21, 2006	Mount Lemmon	Mount Lemmon Survey	·	1.4 km	MPC · JPL
858656	2013 AZ_{144}	—	November 7, 2007	Kitt Peak	Spacewatch	·	1.1 km	MPC · JPL
858657	2013 AW_{146}	—	September 26, 2011	Haleakala	Pan-STARRS 1	·	1.2 km	MPC · JPL
858658	2013 AW_{147}	—	January 4, 2013	Cerro Tololo	D. E. Trilling, R. L. Allen	·	1.1 km	MPC · JPL
858659	2013 AB_{148}	—	October 9, 2007	Kitt Peak	Spacewatch	·	1.1 km	MPC · JPL
858660	2013 AN_{149}	—	December 9, 2012	Kitt Peak	Spacewatch	·	1.2 km	MPC · JPL
858661	2013 AD_{150}	—	January 16, 2013	Mount Lemmon	Mount Lemmon Survey	·	760 m	MPC · JPL
858662	2013 AJ_{152}	—	January 4, 2013	Cerro Tololo	D. E. Trilling, R. L. Allen	·	1.7 km	MPC · JPL
858663	2013 AW_{158}	—	January 4, 2013	Cerro Tololo	D. E. Trilling, R. L. Allen	·	800 m	MPC · JPL
858664	2013 AE_{160}	—	January 16, 2013	Catalina	CSS	·	720 m	MPC · JPL
858665	2013 AS_{160}	—	September 4, 2011	Haleakala	Pan-STARRS 1	·	1.3 km	MPC · JPL
858666	2013 AL_{161}	—	October 18, 2007	Kitt Peak	Spacewatch	·	1.1 km	MPC · JPL
858667	2013 AZ_{162}	—	October 15, 2007	Kitt Peak	Spacewatch	CLO	1.3 km	MPC · JPL
858668	2013 AU_{167}	—	January 4, 2013	Cerro Tololo	D. E. Trilling, R. L. Allen	·	430 m	MPC · JPL
858669	2013 AY_{167}	—	February 10, 2013	Haleakala	Pan-STARRS 1	·	390 m	MPC · JPL
858670	2013 AF_{174}	—	January 17, 2013	Haleakala	Pan-STARRS 1	·	910 m	MPC · JPL
858671	2013 AJ_{180}	—	January 5, 2013	Cerro Tololo	D. E. Trilling, R. L. Allen	·	830 m	MPC · JPL
858672	2013 AU_{183}	—	January 5, 2013	Kitt Peak	Spacewatch	H	400 m	MPC · JPL
858673	2013 AG_{184}	—	January 10, 2013	Haleakala	Pan-STARRS 1	H	360 m	MPC · JPL
858674	2013 AJ_{184}	—	January 7, 2013	Kitt Peak	Spacewatch	DOR	1.5 km	MPC · JPL
858675	2013 AP_{184}	—	September 4, 2011	Haleakala	Pan-STARRS 1	·	1.5 km	MPC · JPL
858676	2013 AJ_{185}	—	January 10, 2013	Haleakala	Pan-STARRS 1	·	530 m	MPC · JPL
858677	2013 AR_{189}	—	January 3, 2013	Mount Lemmon	Mount Lemmon Survey	·	2.3 km	MPC · JPL
858678	2013 AX_{189}	—	May 7, 2014	Haleakala	Pan-STARRS 1	HNS	740 m	MPC · JPL
858679	2013 AN_{190}	—	January 10, 2013	Catalina	CSS	·	1.5 km	MPC · JPL
858680	2013 AZ_{193}	—	January 6, 2013	Kitt Peak	Spacewatch	·	680 m	MPC · JPL
858681	2013 AH_{194}	—	January 12, 2013	Mount Lemmon	Mount Lemmon Survey	·	650 m	MPC · JPL
858682	2013 AV_{194}	—	October 10, 2015	Haleakala	Pan-STARRS 1	·	730 m	MPC · JPL
858683	2013 AY_{195}	—	January 10, 2013	Haleakala	Pan-STARRS 1	·	810 m	MPC · JPL
858684	2013 AY_{196}	—	February 3, 2006	Mount Lemmon	Mount Lemmon Survey	·	490 m	MPC · JPL
858685	2013 AO_{197}	—	January 10, 2013	Haleakala	Pan-STARRS 1	·	1.3 km	MPC · JPL
858686	2013 AD_{198}	—	January 15, 2013	ESA OGS	ESA OGS	GAL	1.1 km	MPC · JPL
858687	2013 AM_{198}	—	January 6, 2013	Kitt Peak	Spacewatch	·	1.5 km	MPC · JPL
858688	2013 AX_{198}	—	January 3, 2013	Mount Lemmon	Mount Lemmon Survey	·	1.2 km	MPC · JPL
858689	2013 AZ_{198}	—	January 12, 2013	Mount Lemmon	Mount Lemmon Survey	·	1.0 km	MPC · JPL
858690	2013 AY_{200}	—	January 14, 2013	Mount Lemmon	Mount Lemmon Survey	H	350 m	MPC · JPL
858691	2013 AG_{202}	—	January 3, 2013	Mount Lemmon	Mount Lemmon Survey	H	390 m	MPC · JPL
858692	2013 AL_{202}	—	January 12, 2013	Mount Lemmon	Mount Lemmon Survey	PHO	630 m	MPC · JPL
858693	2013 AU_{202}	—	January 9, 2013	Kitt Peak	Spacewatch	·	1.6 km	MPC · JPL
858694	2013 AH_{205}	—	January 10, 2013	Haleakala	Pan-STARRS 1	·	1.2 km	MPC · JPL
858695	2013 AR_{205}	—	January 8, 2013	Mount Lemmon	Mount Lemmon Survey	·	1.3 km	MPC · JPL
858696	2013 AG_{207}	—	February 2, 2009	Mount Lemmon	Mount Lemmon Survey	·	810 m	MPC · JPL
858697	2013 AD_{209}	—	January 8, 2013	Westfield	International Astronomical Search Collaboration	·	2.0 km	MPC · JPL
858698	2013 BQ_{4}	—	January 16, 2013	Mount Lemmon	Mount Lemmon Survey	·	2.1 km	MPC · JPL
858699	2013 BS_{4}	—	January 16, 2013	Mount Lemmon	Mount Lemmon Survey	KON	1.6 km	MPC · JPL
858700	2013 BV_{5}	—	January 16, 2013	Mount Lemmon	Mount Lemmon Survey	·	930 m	MPC · JPL

== 858701–858800 ==
back to top

Designation			Discovery			Properties		Ref
Permanent	Provisional	Named after	Date	Site	Discoverer(s)	Category	Diam.	Ref
858701	2013 BY_{15}	—	January 19, 2009	Mount Lemmon	Mount Lemmon Survey	·	1.5 km	MPC · JPL
858702	2013 BR_{16}	—	January 17, 2013	Haleakala	Pan-STARRS 1	H	390 m	MPC · JPL
858703	2013 BL_{22}	—	September 4, 2011	Haleakala	Pan-STARRS 1	·	1.5 km	MPC · JPL
858704	2013 BN_{23}	—	January 17, 2013	Mount Lemmon	Mount Lemmon Survey	·	1.1 km	MPC · JPL
858705	2013 BV_{24}	—	March 18, 2002	Kitt Peak	Deep Ecliptic Survey	·	1.8 km	MPC · JPL
858706	2013 BL_{32}	—	November 13, 2007	Mount Lemmon	Mount Lemmon Survey	·	1.6 km	MPC · JPL
858707	2013 BC_{34}	—	January 17, 2013	Haleakala	Pan-STARRS 1	·	850 m	MPC · JPL
858708	2013 BG_{39}	—	January 9, 2013	Kitt Peak	Spacewatch	·	970 m	MPC · JPL
858709	2013 BU_{41}	—	January 18, 2013	Mount Lemmon	Mount Lemmon Survey	·	750 m	MPC · JPL
858710	2013 BD_{47}	—	January 16, 2013	Haleakala	Pan-STARRS 1	EUN	750 m	MPC · JPL
858711	2013 BV_{55}	—	January 17, 2013	Haleakala	Pan-STARRS 1	·	1.2 km	MPC · JPL
858712	2013 BW_{55}	—	January 17, 2013	Haleakala	Pan-STARRS 1	·	840 m	MPC · JPL
858713	2013 BT_{56}	—	January 5, 2013	Mount Lemmon	Mount Lemmon Survey	·	480 m	MPC · JPL
858714	2013 BS_{60}	—	January 18, 2013	Kitt Peak	Spacewatch	·	1.5 km	MPC · JPL
858715	2013 BQ_{61}	—	March 5, 2008	Kitt Peak	Spacewatch	·	1.6 km	MPC · JPL
858716	2013 BJ_{64}	—	January 10, 2013	Haleakala	Pan-STARRS 1	·	1.0 km	MPC · JPL
858717	2013 BM_{71}	—	January 16, 2013	Haleakala	Pan-STARRS 1	NYS	810 m	MPC · JPL
858718	2013 BV_{75}	—	October 10, 2007	Mount Lemmon	Mount Lemmon Survey	·	1.1 km	MPC · JPL
858719	2013 BD_{77}	—	September 19, 2011	Mount Lemmon	Mount Lemmon Survey	·	1.1 km	MPC · JPL
858720	2013 BS_{83}	—	January 16, 2013	Mount Lemmon	Mount Lemmon Survey	HNS	770 m	MPC · JPL
858721	2013 BS_{84}	—	January 18, 2013	Kitt Peak	Spacewatch	·	840 m	MPC · JPL
858722	2013 BF_{85}	—	January 17, 2013	Haleakala	Pan-STARRS 1	·	1.9 km	MPC · JPL
858723	2013 BN_{85}	—	January 20, 2013	Mount Lemmon	Mount Lemmon Survey	·	610 m	MPC · JPL
858724	2013 BV_{85}	—	January 16, 2013	Haleakala	Pan-STARRS 1	·	920 m	MPC · JPL
858725	2013 BF_{89}	—	January 17, 2013	Haleakala	Pan-STARRS 1	·	1.3 km	MPC · JPL
858726	2013 BJ_{89}	—	January 18, 2013	Mount Lemmon	Mount Lemmon Survey	·	1.7 km	MPC · JPL
858727	2013 BP_{89}	—	January 17, 2013	Kitt Peak	Spacewatch	·	460 m	MPC · JPL
858728	2013 BK_{91}	—	January 20, 2013	Kitt Peak	Spacewatch	·	1.6 km	MPC · JPL
858729	2013 BB_{92}	—	January 16, 2013	Haleakala	Pan-STARRS 1	·	850 m	MPC · JPL
858730	2013 BP_{92}	—	January 18, 2013	Mount Lemmon	Mount Lemmon Survey	V	420 m	MPC · JPL
858731	2013 BT_{92}	—	December 4, 2005	Kitt Peak	Spacewatch	·	440 m	MPC · JPL
858732	2013 BB_{94}	—	January 16, 2013	Haleakala	Pan-STARRS 1	·	1.4 km	MPC · JPL
858733	2013 BJ_{95}	—	January 17, 2013	Haleakala	Pan-STARRS 1	·	1.3 km	MPC · JPL
858734	2013 BJ_{96}	—	January 16, 2013	Haleakala	Pan-STARRS 1	·	1.3 km	MPC · JPL
858735	2013 BD_{97}	—	January 17, 2013	Haleakala	Pan-STARRS 1	·	850 m	MPC · JPL
858736	2013 BH_{97}	—	January 31, 2013	Mount Lemmon	Mount Lemmon Survey	·	1.2 km	MPC · JPL
858737	2013 BF_{98}	—	April 28, 2014	Cerro Tololo	DECam	·	910 m	MPC · JPL
858738	2013 BH_{99}	—	January 16, 2013	Haleakala	Pan-STARRS 1	·	920 m	MPC · JPL
858739	2013 BN_{99}	—	January 18, 2013	Kitt Peak	Spacewatch	·	1.9 km	MPC · JPL
858740	2013 BP_{99}	—	January 19, 2013	Mount Lemmon	Mount Lemmon Survey	·	560 m	MPC · JPL
858741	2013 BA_{100}	—	January 17, 2013	Mount Lemmon	Mount Lemmon Survey	·	630 m	MPC · JPL
858742	2013 BS_{100}	—	January 17, 2013	Haleakala	Pan-STARRS 1	·	2.2 km	MPC · JPL
858743	2013 BV_{101}	—	January 17, 2013	Haleakala	Pan-STARRS 1	·	1.6 km	MPC · JPL
858744	2013 BF_{102}	—	January 16, 2013	Haleakala	Pan-STARRS 1	H	320 m	MPC · JPL
858745	2013 BB_{105}	—	January 17, 2013	Haleakala	Pan-STARRS 1	·	1.4 km	MPC · JPL
858746	2013 BC_{105}	—	January 22, 2013	Mount Lemmon	Mount Lemmon Survey	·	2.1 km	MPC · JPL
858747	2013 BA_{106}	—	January 20, 2013	Kitt Peak	Spacewatch	615	890 m	MPC · JPL
858748	2013 BZ_{106}	—	January 18, 2013	Mount Lemmon	Mount Lemmon Survey	·	810 m	MPC · JPL
858749	2013 BG_{109}	—	January 17, 2013	Kitt Peak	Spacewatch	·	2.0 km	MPC · JPL
858750	2013 BO_{109}	—	January 17, 2013	Mount Lemmon	Mount Lemmon Survey	·	810 m	MPC · JPL
858751	2013 CX	—	January 20, 2013	Mount Lemmon	Mount Lemmon Survey	H	380 m	MPC · JPL
858752	2013 CP_{4}	—	October 6, 2008	Mount Lemmon	Mount Lemmon Survey	·	740 m	MPC · JPL
858753	2013 CM_{9}	—	February 2, 2013	Haleakala	Pan-STARRS 1	·	910 m	MPC · JPL
858754	2013 CO_{13}	—	January 18, 2013	Kitt Peak	Spacewatch	·	1.2 km	MPC · JPL
858755	2013 CH_{15}	—	March 3, 2009	Mount Lemmon	Mount Lemmon Survey	·	1.1 km	MPC · JPL
858756	2013 CA_{17}	—	March 15, 2008	Kitt Peak	Spacewatch	·	1.3 km	MPC · JPL
858757	2013 CX_{17}	—	February 1, 2013	Kitt Peak	Spacewatch	·	690 m	MPC · JPL
858758	2013 CD_{18}	—	February 1, 2013	Kitt Peak	Spacewatch	·	1.4 km	MPC · JPL
858759	2013 CM_{18}	—	March 11, 2003	Palomar	NEAT	·	520 m	MPC · JPL
858760	2013 CK_{20}	—	January 10, 2013	Haleakala	Pan-STARRS 1	·	1.3 km	MPC · JPL
858761	2013 CR_{21}	—	January 14, 2013	Nogales	M. Schwartz, P. R. Holvorcem	·	2.0 km	MPC · JPL
858762	2013 CO_{25}	—	October 31, 2011	Mount Lemmon	Mount Lemmon Survey	·	1.4 km	MPC · JPL
858763	2013 CQ_{26}	—	February 3, 2013	Haleakala	Pan-STARRS 1	·	1.6 km	MPC · JPL
858764	2013 CJ_{34}	—	January 11, 2013	Haleakala	Pan-STARRS 1	H	450 m	MPC · JPL
858765	2013 CB_{36}	—	February 3, 2013	Haleakala	Pan-STARRS 1	H	380 m	MPC · JPL
858766	2013 CF_{43}	—	February 5, 2013	Mount Lemmon	Mount Lemmon Survey	·	500 m	MPC · JPL
858767	2013 CV_{43}	—	February 5, 2013	Kitt Peak	Spacewatch	LUT	2.9 km	MPC · JPL
858768	2013 CZ_{43}	—	February 5, 2013	Kitt Peak	Spacewatch	·	530 m	MPC · JPL
858769	2013 CZ_{45}	—	December 8, 2012	Mount Lemmon	Mount Lemmon Survey	·	2.5 km	MPC · JPL
858770	2013 CH_{52}	—	January 31, 1997	Kitt Peak	Spacewatch	·	1.7 km	MPC · JPL
858771	2013 CE_{59}	—	January 10, 2013	Kitt Peak	Spacewatch	·	950 m	MPC · JPL
858772	2013 CA_{62}	—	January 17, 2013	Kitt Peak	Spacewatch	H	410 m	MPC · JPL
858773	2013 CJ_{63}	—	February 8, 2013	Haleakala	Pan-STARRS 1	·	1.2 km	MPC · JPL
858774	2013 CC_{64}	—	February 8, 2013	Haleakala	Pan-STARRS 1	(5)	870 m	MPC · JPL
858775	2013 CZ_{65}	—	March 11, 2002	Kitt Peak	Spacewatch	NYS	880 m	MPC · JPL
858776	2013 CL_{67}	—	January 1, 2003	Kitt Peak	Spacewatch	·	1.8 km	MPC · JPL
858777	2013 CU_{69}	—	December 25, 2005	Kitt Peak	Spacewatch	·	420 m	MPC · JPL
858778	2013 CJ_{73}	—	February 3, 2013	Haleakala	Pan-STARRS 1	·	530 m	MPC · JPL
858779	2013 CV_{75}	—	December 31, 2008	Kitt Peak	Spacewatch	NYS	880 m	MPC · JPL
858780	2013 CD_{76}	—	January 10, 2013	Kitt Peak	Spacewatch	EUP	2.7 km	MPC · JPL
858781	2013 CW_{88}	—	February 13, 2013	Haleakala	Pan-STARRS 1	H	340 m	MPC · JPL
858782	2013 CZ_{91}	—	January 17, 2013	Kitt Peak	Spacewatch	·	1.4 km	MPC · JPL
858783	2013 CW_{94}	—	January 17, 2013	Kitt Peak	Spacewatch	·	480 m	MPC · JPL
858784	2013 CS_{95}	—	February 8, 2013	Haleakala	Pan-STARRS 1	EUN	910 m	MPC · JPL
858785	2013 CN_{96}	—	February 8, 2013	Haleakala	Pan-STARRS 1	·	1.4 km	MPC · JPL
858786	2013 CR_{96}	—	February 8, 2013	Haleakala	Pan-STARRS 1	·	790 m	MPC · JPL
858787	2013 CZ_{98}	—	December 29, 2005	Kitt Peak	Spacewatch	·	490 m	MPC · JPL
858788	2013 CZ_{103}	—	May 4, 2005	Mount Lemmon	Mount Lemmon Survey	·	1.1 km	MPC · JPL
858789	2013 CE_{106}	—	February 9, 2013	Haleakala	Pan-STARRS 1	·	920 m	MPC · JPL
858790	2013 CW_{117}	—	January 2, 2009	Kitt Peak	Spacewatch	·	760 m	MPC · JPL
858791	2013 CA_{121}	—	February 8, 2013	Kitt Peak	Spacewatch	·	590 m	MPC · JPL
858792	2013 CV_{126}	—	January 31, 2013	Kitt Peak	Spacewatch	·	1.3 km	MPC · JPL
858793	2013 CD_{131}	—	February 5, 2013	Kitt Peak	Spacewatch	NYS	540 m	MPC · JPL
858794	2013 CS_{142}	—	January 20, 2013	Mount Lemmon	Mount Lemmon Survey	·	980 m	MPC · JPL
858795	2013 CZ_{144}	—	January 8, 2013	Mount Lemmon	Mount Lemmon Survey	L4	5.8 km	MPC · JPL
858796	2013 CS_{153}	—	February 14, 2013	Haleakala	Pan-STARRS 1	·	1.6 km	MPC · JPL
858797	2013 CJ_{154}	—	February 14, 2013	Haleakala	Pan-STARRS 1	H	350 m	MPC · JPL
858798	2013 CC_{156}	—	January 17, 2013	Mount Lemmon	Mount Lemmon Survey	·	1.6 km	MPC · JPL
858799	2013 CK_{158}	—	November 2, 2007	Catalina	CSS	·	1.0 km	MPC · JPL
858800	2013 CO_{158}	—	February 6, 2013	Kitt Peak	Spacewatch	H	340 m	MPC · JPL

== 858801–858900 ==
back to top

Designation			Discovery			Properties		Ref
Permanent	Provisional	Named after	Date	Site	Discoverer(s)	Category	Diam.	Ref
858801	2013 CP_{160}	—	February 7, 2013	Kitt Peak	Spacewatch	·	2.2 km	MPC · JPL
858802	2013 CQ_{160}	—	December 18, 2007	Kitt Peak	Spacewatch	·	1.4 km	MPC · JPL
858803	2013 CU_{160}	—	February 14, 2013	Haleakala	Pan-STARRS 1	·	1.1 km	MPC · JPL
858804	2013 CU_{161}	—	February 14, 2013	Haleakala	Pan-STARRS 1	·	2.0 km	MPC · JPL
858805	2013 CP_{169}	—	February 5, 2013	Kitt Peak	Spacewatch	H	360 m	MPC · JPL
858806	2013 CP_{171}	—	March 9, 2002	Kitt Peak	Spacewatch	ERI	950 m	MPC · JPL
858807	2013 CU_{172}	—	February 15, 2013	Haleakala	Pan-STARRS 1	·	520 m	MPC · JPL
858808	2013 CF_{174}	—	January 3, 2009	Kitt Peak	Spacewatch	·	960 m	MPC · JPL
858809	2013 CT_{182}	—	January 18, 2013	Kitt Peak	Spacewatch	·	2.1 km	MPC · JPL
858810	2013 CP_{183}	—	February 6, 2013	Nogales	M. Schwartz, P. R. Holvorcem	·	1.2 km	MPC · JPL
858811	2013 CN_{184}	—	February 7, 2013	Catalina	CSS	·	2.0 km	MPC · JPL
858812	2013 CP_{184}	—	February 7, 2013	Catalina	CSS	·	2.1 km	MPC · JPL
858813	2013 CC_{192}	—	February 14, 2013	ESA OGS	ESA OGS	·	610 m	MPC · JPL
858814	2013 CT_{195}	—	February 9, 2013	Haleakala	Pan-STARRS 1	·	1.7 km	MPC · JPL
858815	2013 CK_{204}	—	February 5, 2013	Oukaïmeden	C. Rinner	·	1.4 km	MPC · JPL
858816	2013 CH_{205}	—	February 9, 2013	Haleakala	Pan-STARRS 1	·	750 m	MPC · JPL
858817	2013 CV_{208}	—	February 14, 2013	Haleakala	Pan-STARRS 1	·	690 m	MPC · JPL
858818	2013 CX_{215}	—	February 8, 2013	Haleakala	Pan-STARRS 1	·	2.1 km	MPC · JPL
858819	2013 CW_{216}	—	February 6, 2013	Kitt Peak	Spacewatch	·	1.3 km	MPC · JPL
858820	2013 CZ_{217}	—	February 8, 2013	Haleakala	Pan-STARRS 1	·	950 m	MPC · JPL
858821	2013 CX_{219}	—	February 5, 2013	Kitt Peak	Spacewatch	·	1.7 km	MPC · JPL
858822	2013 CW_{223}	—	February 14, 2013	Mount Lemmon	Mount Lemmon Survey	H	360 m	MPC · JPL
858823	2013 CD_{224}	—	April 2, 2009	Mount Lemmon	Mount Lemmon Survey	JUN	630 m	MPC · JPL
858824	2013 CO_{224}	—	February 15, 2013	Haleakala	Pan-STARRS 1	·	480 m	MPC · JPL
858825	2013 CB_{225}	—	October 13, 2010	Mount Lemmon	Mount Lemmon Survey	·	1.8 km	MPC · JPL
858826	2013 CT_{226}	—	February 8, 2013	Haleakala	Pan-STARRS 1	(194)	860 m	MPC · JPL
858827	2013 CN_{227}	—	February 15, 2013	ESA OGS	ESA OGS	·	2.0 km	MPC · JPL
858828	2013 CO_{227}	—	February 15, 2013	Haleakala	Pan-STARRS 1	·	1.7 km	MPC · JPL
858829	2013 CK_{228}	—	February 15, 2013	Haleakala	Pan-STARRS 1	EUN	820 m	MPC · JPL
858830	2013 CX_{228}	—	February 8, 2013	Haleakala	Pan-STARRS 1	·	870 m	MPC · JPL
858831	2013 CZ_{228}	—	February 9, 2013	Haleakala	Pan-STARRS 1	NYS	860 m	MPC · JPL
858832	2013 CU_{229}	—	February 11, 2013	Nogales	M. Schwartz, P. R. Holvorcem	(1547)	1.4 km	MPC · JPL
858833	2013 CS_{230}	—	February 4, 2013	Calar Alto	S. Mottola, S. Hellmich	·	860 m	MPC · JPL
858834	2013 CG_{231}	—	October 22, 2003	Sacramento Peak	SDSS	·	740 m	MPC · JPL
858835	2013 CD_{232}	—	February 5, 2013	Kitt Peak	Spacewatch	·	800 m	MPC · JPL
858836	2013 CW_{232}	—	February 8, 2013	Haleakala	Pan-STARRS 1	·	570 m	MPC · JPL
858837	2013 CL_{234}	—	February 1, 2017	Kitt Peak	Spacewatch	·	1.0 km	MPC · JPL
858838	2013 CP_{234}	—	February 15, 2013	Haleakala	Pan-STARRS 1	·	560 m	MPC · JPL
858839	2013 CR_{234}	—	February 14, 2013	Haleakala	Pan-STARRS 1	MAR	750 m	MPC · JPL
858840	2013 CR_{235}	—	February 14, 2013	Haleakala	Pan-STARRS 1	·	560 m	MPC · JPL
858841	2013 CH_{236}	—	September 8, 2015	Haleakala	Pan-STARRS 1	·	1.2 km	MPC · JPL
858842	2013 CX_{236}	—	September 6, 2015	Haleakala	Pan-STARRS 1	·	1.4 km	MPC · JPL
858843	2013 CF_{238}	—	October 10, 2015	Haleakala	Pan-STARRS 1	V	430 m	MPC · JPL
858844	2013 CU_{238}	—	February 10, 2013	Nogales	M. Schwartz, P. R. Holvorcem	·	810 m	MPC · JPL
858845	2013 CZ_{239}	—	February 14, 2013	Mount Lemmon	Mount Lemmon Survey	·	1.3 km	MPC · JPL
858846	2013 CY_{240}	—	February 14, 2013	Kitt Peak	Spacewatch	·	520 m	MPC · JPL
858847	2013 CH_{241}	—	February 15, 2013	Haleakala	Pan-STARRS 1	V	410 m	MPC · JPL
858848	2013 CB_{242}	—	February 15, 2013	Haleakala	Pan-STARRS 1	·	630 m	MPC · JPL
858849	2013 CK_{242}	—	February 6, 2013	Kitt Peak	Spacewatch	V	450 m	MPC · JPL
858850	2013 CN_{242}	—	February 15, 2013	Haleakala	Pan-STARRS 1	·	710 m	MPC · JPL
858851	2013 CB_{243}	—	February 8, 2013	Haleakala	Pan-STARRS 1	·	2.0 km	MPC · JPL
858852	2013 CF_{243}	—	February 5, 2013	Haleakala	Pan-STARRS 1	·	1.5 km	MPC · JPL
858853	2013 CH_{243}	—	February 14, 2013	Haleakala	Pan-STARRS 1	·	2.5 km	MPC · JPL
858854	2013 CP_{243}	—	February 8, 2013	Haleakala	Pan-STARRS 1	EUN	810 m	MPC · JPL
858855	2013 CW_{243}	—	February 15, 2013	Haleakala	Pan-STARRS 1	KOR	970 m	MPC · JPL
858856	2013 CW_{244}	—	February 9, 2013	Haleakala	Pan-STARRS 1	·	1.5 km	MPC · JPL
858857	2013 CJ_{245}	—	February 14, 2013	Haleakala	Pan-STARRS 1	·	1.9 km	MPC · JPL
858858	2013 CW_{245}	—	February 6, 2013	Kitt Peak	Spacewatch	(16286)	1.6 km	MPC · JPL
858859	2013 CD_{246}	—	December 5, 2008	Kitt Peak	Spacewatch	NYS	860 m	MPC · JPL
858860	2013 CX_{246}	—	February 14, 2013	Haleakala	Pan-STARRS 1	·	830 m	MPC · JPL
858861	2013 CN_{248}	—	January 15, 2013	ESA OGS	ESA OGS	·	720 m	MPC · JPL
858862	2013 CT_{249}	—	February 8, 2013	Haleakala	Pan-STARRS 1	H	340 m	MPC · JPL
858863	2013 CT_{250}	—	February 14, 2013	Haleakala	Pan-STARRS 1	L4	5.9 km	MPC · JPL
858864	2013 CX_{250}	—	February 3, 2013	Haleakala	Pan-STARRS 1	PHO	550 m	MPC · JPL
858865	2013 CF_{254}	—	February 5, 2013	Mount Lemmon	Mount Lemmon Survey	·	1.4 km	MPC · JPL
858866	2013 CO_{254}	—	February 3, 2013	Haleakala	Pan-STARRS 1	L4	5.9 km	MPC · JPL
858867	2013 CG_{255}	—	February 8, 2013	Haleakala	Pan-STARRS 1	L4	5.4 km	MPC · JPL
858868	2013 CX_{257}	—	February 9, 2013	Haleakala	Pan-STARRS 1	·	1.2 km	MPC · JPL
858869	2013 CX_{258}	—	February 3, 2013	Haleakala	Pan-STARRS 1	·	1.3 km	MPC · JPL
858870	2013 CY_{258}	—	February 3, 2013	Haleakala	Pan-STARRS 1	3:2	4.6 km	MPC · JPL
858871	2013 CX_{260}	—	February 5, 2013	Mount Lemmon	Mount Lemmon Survey	·	2.1 km	MPC · JPL
858872	2013 CY_{260}	—	February 7, 2013	Cerro Tololo-DECam	DECam	H	350 m	MPC · JPL
858873	2013 CD_{261}	—	February 3, 2013	Haleakala	Pan-STARRS 1	·	680 m	MPC · JPL
858874	2013 CT_{261}	—	February 8, 2013	Haleakala	Pan-STARRS 1	·	1.7 km	MPC · JPL
858875	2013 CZ_{265}	—	October 20, 2016	Mount Lemmon	Mount Lemmon Survey	·	1.8 km	MPC · JPL
858876	2013 CQ_{269}	—	February 9, 2013	Haleakala	Pan-STARRS 1	·	1.6 km	MPC · JPL
858877	2013 CW_{269}	—	February 5, 2013	Mount Lemmon	Mount Lemmon Survey	·	1.4 km	MPC · JPL
858878	2013 DN_{3}	—	February 8, 2013	Haleakala	Pan-STARRS 1	MAS	520 m	MPC · JPL
858879	2013 DA_{4}	—	February 9, 2013	Haleakala	Pan-STARRS 1	·	420 m	MPC · JPL
858880	2013 DU_{11}	—	September 6, 2008	Mount Lemmon	Mount Lemmon Survey	H	400 m	MPC · JPL
858881	2013 DX_{12}	—	May 10, 2005	Kitt Peak	Spacewatch	·	900 m	MPC · JPL
858882	2013 DF_{15}	—	February 18, 2013	La Silla	La Silla	·	1.5 km	MPC · JPL
858883	2013 DH_{17}	—	February 16, 2013	Kitt Peak	Spacewatch	·	1.3 km	MPC · JPL
858884	2013 DO_{17}	—	February 17, 2013	Kitt Peak	Spacewatch	TIR	2.0 km	MPC · JPL
858885	2013 DB_{18}	—	February 16, 2013	Mount Lemmon	Mount Lemmon Survey	·	720 m	MPC · JPL
858886	2013 DL_{19}	—	February 16, 2013	Mount Lemmon	Mount Lemmon Survey	·	1.2 km	MPC · JPL
858887	2013 DA_{21}	—	February 16, 2013	Mount Lemmon	Mount Lemmon Survey	GEF	780 m	MPC · JPL
858888	2013 EY_{1}	—	February 8, 2013	Mount Lemmon	Mount Lemmon Survey	·	720 m	MPC · JPL
858889	2013 EB_{2}	—	May 25, 2006	Kitt Peak	Spacewatch	MAS	580 m	MPC · JPL
858890	2013 EU_{3}	—	January 26, 2006	Kitt Peak	Spacewatch	·	460 m	MPC · JPL
858891	2013 EB_{5}	—	March 4, 2013	Haleakala	Pan-STARRS 1	·	1.1 km	MPC · JPL
858892	2013 EC_{5}	—	March 4, 2013	Siding Spring	SSS	T_{j} (2.88)	1.7 km	MPC · JPL
858893	2013 EZ_{7}	—	March 3, 2013	Westfield	International Astronomical Search Collaboration	T_{j} (2.93)	2.5 km	MPC · JPL
858894	2013 ES_{8}	—	March 3, 2013	Mount Lemmon	Mount Lemmon Survey	·	1.6 km	MPC · JPL
858895	2013 EZ_{9}	—	November 3, 2007	Mount Lemmon	Mount Lemmon Survey	·	850 m	MPC · JPL
858896	2013 EK_{10}	—	May 4, 2008	Kitt Peak	Spacewatch	H	410 m	MPC · JPL
858897	2013 EA_{14}	—	February 16, 2013	Kitt Peak	Spacewatch	ERI	960 m	MPC · JPL
858898	2013 EP_{15}	—	March 3, 2013	Kitt Peak	Spacewatch	·	1.9 km	MPC · JPL
858899	2013 EE_{17}	—	February 9, 2013	Haleakala	Pan-STARRS 1	·	1.5 km	MPC · JPL
858900	2013 ET_{18}	—	March 5, 2013	Mount Lemmon	Mount Lemmon Survey	·	660 m	MPC · JPL

== 858901–859000 ==
back to top

Designation			Discovery			Properties		Ref
Permanent	Provisional	Named after	Date	Site	Discoverer(s)	Category	Diam.	Ref
858901	2013 EL_{19}	—	March 5, 2013	Haleakala	Pan-STARRS 1	·	1.7 km	MPC · JPL
858902	2013 EC_{21}	—	March 6, 2013	Haleakala	Pan-STARRS 1	·	1 km	MPC · JPL
858903	2013 EJ_{26}	—	February 6, 2013	Kitt Peak	Spacewatch	·	530 m	MPC · JPL
858904	2013 EN_{27}	—	March 7, 2013	Mount Lemmon	Mount Lemmon Survey	·	1.2 km	MPC · JPL
858905	2013 EK_{29}	—	September 3, 2010	Mount Lemmon	Mount Lemmon Survey	AGN	890 m	MPC · JPL
858906	2013 EB_{38}	—	March 8, 2013	Haleakala	Pan-STARRS 1	·	1.1 km	MPC · JPL
858907	2013 EW_{38}	—	March 8, 2013	Haleakala	Pan-STARRS 1	·	680 m	MPC · JPL
858908	2013 EG_{40}	—	January 20, 2013	Mount Lemmon	Mount Lemmon Survey	H	420 m	MPC · JPL
858909	2013 EK_{42}	—	March 6, 2013	Haleakala	Pan-STARRS 1	·	590 m	MPC · JPL
858910	2013 EQ_{43}	—	February 14, 2013	Kitt Peak	Spacewatch	·	690 m	MPC · JPL
858911	2013 EE_{45}	—	October 26, 2011	Haleakala	Pan-STARRS 1	·	1.4 km	MPC · JPL
858912	2013 EW_{45}	—	March 6, 2013	Haleakala	Pan-STARRS 1	·	1.6 km	MPC · JPL
858913	2013 EN_{46}	—	March 6, 2013	Haleakala	Pan-STARRS 1	KOR	1.1 km	MPC · JPL
858914	2013 EW_{48}	—	March 6, 2013	Haleakala	Pan-STARRS 1	·	1.3 km	MPC · JPL
858915	2013 EJ_{49}	—	March 6, 2013	Haleakala	Pan-STARRS 1	H	370 m	MPC · JPL
858916	2013 EG_{50}	—	March 6, 2013	Haleakala	Pan-STARRS 1	·	810 m	MPC · JPL
858917	2013 ES_{50}	—	March 6, 2013	Haleakala	Pan-STARRS 1	·	450 m	MPC · JPL
858918	2013 EA_{51}	—	August 24, 2011	Haleakala	Pan-STARRS 1	DOR	1.6 km	MPC · JPL
858919	2013 EB_{51}	—	February 5, 2013	Kitt Peak	Spacewatch	·	710 m	MPC · JPL
858920	2013 EQ_{52}	—	March 8, 2013	Haleakala	Pan-STARRS 1	KOR	1.1 km	MPC · JPL
858921	2013 ES_{52}	—	March 8, 2013	Haleakala	Pan-STARRS 1	·	1.5 km	MPC · JPL
858922	2013 EL_{53}	—	March 8, 2013	Haleakala	Pan-STARRS 1	·	1.7 km	MPC · JPL
858923	2013 EF_{54}	—	February 9, 2008	Kitt Peak	Spacewatch	KOR	1.0 km	MPC · JPL
858924	2013 ER_{55}	—	March 2, 2008	Kitt Peak	Spacewatch	·	1.1 km	MPC · JPL
858925	2013 EU_{58}	—	March 8, 2013	Haleakala	Pan-STARRS 1	HNS	810 m	MPC · JPL
858926	2013 EB_{62}	—	November 11, 2006	Kitt Peak	Spacewatch	KOR	1.2 km	MPC · JPL
858927	2013 EC_{62}	—	March 8, 2013	Haleakala	Pan-STARRS 1	KOR	1.2 km	MPC · JPL
858928	2013 ES_{64}	—	March 8, 2013	Haleakala	Pan-STARRS 1	·	610 m	MPC · JPL
858929	2013 EE_{70}	—	March 3, 2013	Mount Lemmon	Mount Lemmon Survey	HNS	660 m	MPC · JPL
858930	2013 EU_{72}	—	March 7, 2013	Mount Lemmon	Mount Lemmon Survey	·	790 m	MPC · JPL
858931	2013 EW_{73}	—	October 26, 2011	Haleakala	Pan-STARRS 1	·	1.3 km	MPC · JPL
858932	2013 EC_{74}	—	January 13, 2008	Kitt Peak	Spacewatch	·	1.4 km	MPC · JPL
858933	2013 EL_{76}	—	February 19, 2013	Kitt Peak	Spacewatch	3:2	4.0 km	MPC · JPL
858934	2013 ED_{78}	—	March 8, 2013	Haleakala	Pan-STARRS 1	EUN	830 m	MPC · JPL
858935	2013 ER_{78}	—	February 12, 2013	ESA OGS	ESA OGS	·	1.4 km	MPC · JPL
858936	2013 EU_{79}	—	December 31, 2008	Kitt Peak	Spacewatch	MAS	520 m	MPC · JPL
858937	2013 EH_{80}	—	February 17, 2013	Mount Lemmon	Mount Lemmon Survey	HNS	760 m	MPC · JPL
858938	2013 EC_{81}	—	November 11, 2007	Mount Lemmon	Mount Lemmon Survey	·	1.3 km	MPC · JPL
858939	2013 EQ_{92}	—	March 7, 2013	Nogales	M. Schwartz, P. R. Holvorcem	·	1.2 km	MPC · JPL
858940	2013 EZ_{94}	—	March 8, 2013	Haleakala	Pan-STARRS 1	AGN	800 m	MPC · JPL
858941	2013 EA_{98}	—	March 8, 2013	Haleakala	Pan-STARRS 1	·	1.6 km	MPC · JPL
858942	2013 EN_{99}	—	March 8, 2013	Haleakala	Pan-STARRS 1	·	1.5 km	MPC · JPL
858943	2013 ER_{100}	—	March 8, 2013	Haleakala	Pan-STARRS 1	·	940 m	MPC · JPL
858944	2013 EU_{112}	—	September 4, 2011	Haleakala	Pan-STARRS 1	·	810 m	MPC · JPL
858945	2013 EE_{113}	—	February 18, 2013	Kitt Peak	Spacewatch	·	880 m	MPC · JPL
858946	2013 ES_{113}	—	November 30, 2011	Kitt Peak	Spacewatch	·	1.6 km	MPC · JPL
858947	2013 ES_{118}	—	March 4, 2013	Haleakala	Pan-STARRS 1	H	540 m	MPC · JPL
858948	2013 EP_{122}	—	March 15, 2013	Mount Lemmon	Mount Lemmon Survey	·	1.1 km	MPC · JPL
858949	2013 EV_{125}	—	March 15, 2013	Kitt Peak	Spacewatch	H	390 m	MPC · JPL
858950	2013 EF_{129}	—	March 5, 2013	Mayhill-ISON	L. Elenin	·	970 m	MPC · JPL
858951	2013 EX_{130}	—	February 7, 2013	Kitt Peak	Spacewatch	·	1.3 km	MPC · JPL
858952	2013 ET_{135}	—	November 3, 2010	Mount Lemmon	Mount Lemmon Survey	·	1.3 km	MPC · JPL
858953	2013 EZ_{135}	—	May 9, 2013	Haleakala	Pan-STARRS 1	·	1.4 km	MPC · JPL
858954	2013 EK_{136}	—	September 4, 2010	Kitt Peak	Spacewatch	MAS	540 m	MPC · JPL
858955	2013 EK_{142}	—	March 13, 2013	Kitt Peak	Research and Education Collaborative Occultation Network	KOR	920 m	MPC · JPL
858956	2013 EJ_{144}	—	February 9, 2013	Haleakala	Pan-STARRS 1	·	1.3 km	MPC · JPL
858957	2013 EM_{145}	—	March 13, 2013	Kitt Peak	Research and Education Collaborative Occultation Network	VER	1.8 km	MPC · JPL
858958	2013 EK_{147}	—	January 27, 2012	Mount Lemmon	Mount Lemmon Survey	L4	5.7 km	MPC · JPL
858959	2013 EJ_{152}	—	November 25, 2011	Haleakala	Pan-STARRS 1	·	520 m	MPC · JPL
858960	2013 EH_{153}	—	May 9, 2013	Haleakala	Pan-STARRS 1	·	1.5 km	MPC · JPL
858961	2013 EZ_{159}	—	March 8, 2013	Haleakala	Pan-STARRS 1	H	240 m	MPC · JPL
858962	2013 EB_{161}	—	March 8, 2013	Haleakala	Pan-STARRS 1	·	800 m	MPC · JPL
858963	2013 ET_{161}	—	March 5, 2013	Haleakala	Pan-STARRS 1	·	1.4 km	MPC · JPL
858964	2013 ED_{162}	—	March 5, 2013	Haleakala	Pan-STARRS 1	·	840 m	MPC · JPL
858965	2013 EE_{162}	—	March 13, 2013	Mount Lemmon	Mount Lemmon Survey	·	1.2 km	MPC · JPL
858966	2013 EP_{162}	—	March 3, 2013	Nogales	M. Schwartz, P. R. Holvorcem	·	1.4 km	MPC · JPL
858967	2013 EU_{162}	—	March 8, 2013	Haleakala	Pan-STARRS 1	·	1.1 km	MPC · JPL
858968	2013 EX_{162}	—	March 15, 2013	Kitt Peak	Spacewatch	·	790 m	MPC · JPL
858969	2013 EA_{163}	—	May 7, 2014	Haleakala	Pan-STARRS 1	·	1.0 km	MPC · JPL
858970	2013 EB_{163}	—	March 5, 2013	Haleakala	Pan-STARRS 1	·	1.6 km	MPC · JPL
858971	2013 EH_{163}	—	March 4, 2013	Haleakala	Pan-STARRS 1	·	1.5 km	MPC · JPL
858972	2013 EK_{163}	—	February 16, 2013	Mount Lemmon	Mount Lemmon Survey	·	1.0 km	MPC · JPL
858973	2013 EF_{165}	—	March 4, 2013	Haleakala	Pan-STARRS 1	·	1.6 km	MPC · JPL
858974	2013 EN_{165}	—	October 14, 2015	Cerro Paranal	Gaia Ground Based Optical Tracking	HYG	2.1 km	MPC · JPL
858975	2013 ER_{166}	—	March 13, 2013	Kitt Peak	Spacewatch	·	1.6 km	MPC · JPL
858976	2013 EV_{166}	—	March 5, 2013	Haleakala	Pan-STARRS 1	·	1.6 km	MPC · JPL
858977	2013 EJ_{167}	—	March 3, 2013	Mount Lemmon	Mount Lemmon Survey	·	800 m	MPC · JPL
858978	2013 EW_{168}	—	March 7, 2013	Mount Lemmon	Mount Lemmon Survey	·	640 m	MPC · JPL
858979	2013 EZ_{168}	—	March 13, 2013	Haleakala	Pan-STARRS 1	·	630 m	MPC · JPL
858980	2013 ED_{169}	—	March 7, 2013	Kitt Peak	Spacewatch	·	730 m	MPC · JPL
858981	2013 EL_{169}	—	March 3, 2013	Mount Lemmon	Mount Lemmon Survey	·	2.1 km	MPC · JPL
858982	2013 EO_{169}	—	March 6, 2013	Haleakala	Pan-STARRS 1	(2076)	540 m	MPC · JPL
858983	2013 EO_{170}	—	March 6, 2013	Haleakala	Pan-STARRS 1	·	790 m	MPC · JPL
858984	2013 EQ_{170}	—	March 7, 2013	Kitt Peak	Spacewatch	·	910 m	MPC · JPL
858985	2013 EE_{172}	—	March 3, 2013	Mount Lemmon	Mount Lemmon Survey	·	1.5 km	MPC · JPL
858986	2013 ED_{173}	—	March 12, 2013	Kitt Peak	Spacewatch	NYS	800 m	MPC · JPL
858987	2013 EC_{176}	—	March 6, 2013	Haleakala	Pan-STARRS 1	T_{j} (2.92)	4.1 km	MPC · JPL
858988	2013 ET_{176}	—	March 7, 2013	Mount Lemmon	Mount Lemmon Survey	·	680 m	MPC · JPL
858989	2013 EN_{177}	—	September 25, 2011	Haleakala	Pan-STARRS 1	·	1.4 km	MPC · JPL
858990	2013 EP_{181}	—	March 11, 2013	Mount Lemmon	Mount Lemmon Survey	·	1.3 km	MPC · JPL
858991	2013 EY_{181}	—	March 3, 2013	Mount Lemmon	Mount Lemmon Survey	3:2	3.5 km	MPC · JPL
858992	2013 EW_{186}	—	March 13, 2013	Haleakala	Pan-STARRS 1	LUT	2.7 km	MPC · JPL
858993	2013 EQ_{188}	—	March 5, 2013	Haleakala	Pan-STARRS 1	·	820 m	MPC · JPL
858994	2013 EK_{190}	—	March 5, 2013	Haleakala	Pan-STARRS 1	·	1.2 km	MPC · JPL
858995	2013 ES_{190}	—	March 6, 2013	Haleakala	Pan-STARRS 1	·	1.6 km	MPC · JPL
858996	2013 ET_{190}	—	March 13, 2013	Haleakala	Pan-STARRS 1	·	1.5 km	MPC · JPL
858997	2013 FF_{5}	—	March 15, 2013	Mount Lemmon	Mount Lemmon Survey	·	1.4 km	MPC · JPL
858998	2013 FC_{7}	—	October 18, 2011	Kitt Peak	Spacewatch	·	1.7 km	MPC · JPL
858999	2013 FH_{8}	—	March 19, 2013	Haleakala	Pan-STARRS 1	H	380 m	MPC · JPL
859000	2013 FX_{9}	—	March 17, 2013	Mount Lemmon	Mount Lemmon Survey	·	490 m	MPC · JPL

back to top

== Meaning of names ==
As minor planet discoveries are confirmed, they are given a permanent number by the IAU's Minor Planet Center (MPC), and the discoverers can then submit names for them, following the IAU's naming conventions. The list below concerns those minor planets in the specified number-range that have received names, and explains the meanings of those names.

Official naming citations of newly named small Solar System bodies are approved and published in a bulletin by IAU's Working Group for Small Bodies Nomenclature (WGSBN). Before May 2021, citations were published in MPC's Minor Planet Circulars for many decades. Recent citations can also be found on the JPL Small-Body Database (SBDB). Until his death in 2016, German astronomer Lutz D. Schmadel compiled these citations into the Dictionary of Minor Planet Names (DMP) and regularly updated the collection.

Based on Paul Herget's The Names of the Minor Planets, Schmadel also researched the unclear origin of numerous asteroids, most of which had been named prior to World War II. This article incorporates text from this source, which is in the public domain: SBDB New namings may only be added to this list below after official publication as the preannouncement of names is condemned. The WGSBN publishes a comprehensive guideline for the naming rules of non-cometary small Solar System bodies.

Named minor planet	Provisional	This minor planet was named for...	Ref · Catalog
858332 Grischun	2012 VW_{81}	Grischun is a Romansh name of Graubünden, the easternmost Swiss canton	IAU · 858332
858334 Gioacchinopecci	2012 VT_{87}	Gioacchino Vincenzo Raffaele Luigi Pecci (Pope Leo XIII, 1810–1903) had a great interest in the sciences and was responsible for the re-establishment and reform of the Vatican Observatory in 1891 within the walls of the Vatican.	IAU · 858334
