= List of minor planets: 703001–704000 =

The following is a partial list of minor planets, running from minor-planet number 703001 through 704000, inclusive. The primary data for this and other partial lists is based on JPL's "Small-Body Orbital Elements" and data available from the Minor Planet Center. Critical list information is also provided by the MPC, unless otherwise specified from Lowell Observatory. A detailed description of the table's columns and additional sources are given on the main page including a complete list of every page in this series, and a statistical break-up on the dynamical classification of minor planets.

Also see the summary list of all named bodies in numerical and alphabetical order, and the corresponding naming citations for the number range of this particular list. New namings may only be added to this list after official publication, as the preannouncement of names is condemned by the Working Group for Small Bodies Nomenclature of the International Astronomical Union.

Near-Earth obj.	MBA (inner)	MBA (outer)	Centaur
Mars-crosser	MBA (middle)	Jupiter trojan	Trans-Neptunian obj.
Unclassified

== 703001–703100 ==
Designation			Discovery			Properties		Ref
Permanent	Provisional	Named after	Date	Site	Discoverer(s)	Category	Diam.	Ref
703001	2006 WB_{218}	—	September 15, 2009	Kitt Peak	Spacewatch	·	660 m	MPC · JPL
703002	2006 WX_{218}	—	January 4, 2016	Haleakala	Pan-STARRS 1	·	2.2 km	MPC · JPL
703003	2006 WE_{220}	—	November 19, 2006	Kitt Peak	Spacewatch	LIX	2.6 km	MPC · JPL
703004	2006 WP_{220}	—	April 30, 2016	Haleakala	Pan-STARRS 1	HYG	2.2 km	MPC · JPL
703005	2006 WY_{222}	—	October 12, 2015	Haleakala	Pan-STARRS 1	·	1.4 km	MPC · JPL
703006	2006 WF_{223}	—	November 16, 2006	Mount Lemmon	Mount Lemmon Survey	·	940 m	MPC · JPL
703007	2006 WM_{223}	—	March 8, 2013	Haleakala	Pan-STARRS 1	·	1.6 km	MPC · JPL
703008	2006 WB_{225}	—	December 23, 2017	Haleakala	Pan-STARRS 1	·	1.6 km	MPC · JPL
703009	2006 WA_{229}	—	November 24, 2006	Mount Lemmon	Mount Lemmon Survey	·	2.1 km	MPC · JPL
703010	2006 WQ_{231}	—	November 20, 2006	Kitt Peak	Spacewatch	KOR	1.1 km	MPC · JPL
703011	2006 WQ_{232}	—	November 22, 2006	Kitt Peak	Spacewatch	·	1.9 km	MPC · JPL
703012	2006 WV_{232}	—	November 23, 2006	Mount Lemmon	Mount Lemmon Survey	HYG	2.3 km	MPC · JPL
703013	2006 WJ_{234}	—	November 19, 2006	Kitt Peak	Spacewatch	KOR	1.1 km	MPC · JPL
703014	2006 WE_{238}	—	November 20, 2006	Kitt Peak	Spacewatch	·	750 m	MPC · JPL
703015	2006 XX_{13}	—	December 10, 2006	Kitt Peak	Spacewatch	MAS	620 m	MPC · JPL
703016	2006 XB_{28}	—	November 19, 2006	Kitt Peak	Spacewatch	NYS	1.0 km	MPC · JPL
703017	2006 XO_{29}	—	November 22, 2006	Kitt Peak	Spacewatch	·	690 m	MPC · JPL
703018	2006 XS_{38}	—	December 11, 2006	Kitt Peak	Spacewatch	·	3.7 km	MPC · JPL
703019	2006 XH_{39}	—	December 11, 2006	Kitt Peak	Spacewatch	H	550 m	MPC · JPL
703020	2006 XV_{40}	—	December 12, 2006	Kitt Peak	Spacewatch	·	2.0 km	MPC · JPL
703021	2006 XD_{47}	—	December 13, 2006	Mount Lemmon	Mount Lemmon Survey	·	1.9 km	MPC · JPL
703022	2006 XV_{50}	—	November 27, 2006	Mount Lemmon	Mount Lemmon Survey	·	1.0 km	MPC · JPL
703023	2006 XG_{51}	—	December 13, 2006	Kitt Peak	Spacewatch	·	1.3 km	MPC · JPL
703024	2006 XC_{60}	—	December 14, 2006	Kitt Peak	Spacewatch	·	1.8 km	MPC · JPL
703025	2006 XX_{61}	—	November 17, 2006	Kitt Peak	Spacewatch	H	490 m	MPC · JPL
703026	2006 XO_{71}	—	December 15, 2006	Mount Lemmon	Mount Lemmon Survey	·	1.8 km	MPC · JPL
703027	2006 XD_{77}	—	May 4, 2009	Mount Lemmon	Mount Lemmon Survey	·	1.6 km	MPC · JPL
703028	2006 XJ_{77}	—	August 16, 2009	Kitt Peak	Spacewatch	MAS	820 m	MPC · JPL
703029	2006 XT_{77}	—	January 24, 2011	Kitt Peak	Spacewatch	·	950 m	MPC · JPL
703030	2006 XR_{79}	—	September 24, 2009	Kitt Peak	Spacewatch	·	610 m	MPC · JPL
703031	2006 XS_{79}	—	January 4, 2012	Mount Lemmon	Mount Lemmon Survey	·	1.7 km	MPC · JPL
703032	2006 XT_{79}	—	July 25, 2014	Haleakala	Pan-STARRS 1	·	1.4 km	MPC · JPL
703033	2006 XB_{83}	—	December 13, 2006	Kitt Peak	Spacewatch	KOR	1.0 km	MPC · JPL
703034	2006 YF_{24}	—	December 21, 2006	Kitt Peak	Spacewatch	·	800 m	MPC · JPL
703035	2006 YL_{25}	—	December 21, 2006	Kitt Peak	Spacewatch	·	810 m	MPC · JPL
703036	2006 YY_{27}	—	December 21, 2006	Kitt Peak	Spacewatch	·	1.7 km	MPC · JPL
703037	2006 YF_{42}	—	December 22, 2006	Kitt Peak	Spacewatch	·	840 m	MPC · JPL
703038	2006 YM_{44}	—	December 25, 2006	Kitt Peak	Spacewatch	·	3.0 km	MPC · JPL
703039	2006 YF_{53}	—	January 9, 2007	Mount Lemmon	Mount Lemmon Survey	·	2.0 km	MPC · JPL
703040	2006 YW_{56}	—	December 10, 2006	Kitt Peak	Spacewatch	PHO	750 m	MPC · JPL
703041	2006 YH_{57}	—	December 21, 2006	Kitt Peak	Spacewatch	·	1.3 km	MPC · JPL
703042	2006 YR_{57}	—	March 27, 2012	Mount Lemmon	Mount Lemmon Survey	PHO	940 m	MPC · JPL
703043	2006 YE_{58}	—	September 27, 2009	Catalina	CSS	NYS	900 m	MPC · JPL
703044	2006 YA_{59}	—	October 9, 2016	Haleakala	Pan-STARRS 1	·	2.3 km	MPC · JPL
703045	2006 YH_{59}	—	July 12, 2013	Haleakala	Pan-STARRS 1	·	860 m	MPC · JPL
703046	2006 YO_{59}	—	October 19, 2012	Haleakala	Pan-STARRS 1	·	480 m	MPC · JPL
703047	2006 YU_{59}	—	December 21, 2006	Kitt Peak	L. H. Wasserman, M. W. Buie	GEF	1.1 km	MPC · JPL
703048	2006 YL_{62}	—	August 28, 2014	Haleakala	Pan-STARRS 1	·	1.7 km	MPC · JPL
703049	2006 YM_{62}	—	December 21, 2006	Mount Lemmon	Mount Lemmon Survey	·	1.6 km	MPC · JPL
703050	2006 YQ_{63}	—	November 24, 2006	Kitt Peak	Spacewatch	·	2.0 km	MPC · JPL
703051	2006 YF_{65}	—	August 28, 2009	Kitt Peak	Spacewatch	·	950 m	MPC · JPL
703052	2006 YO_{66}	—	December 27, 2006	Catalina	CSS	H	510 m	MPC · JPL
703053	2006 YD_{68}	—	December 21, 2006	Kitt Peak	L. H. Wasserman, M. W. Buie	·	1.0 km	MPC · JPL
703054	2007 AY_{1}	—	January 9, 2007	Kitt Peak	Spacewatch	H	470 m	MPC · JPL
703055	2007 AA_{7}	—	December 27, 2006	Mount Lemmon	Mount Lemmon Survey	NYS	860 m	MPC · JPL
703056	2007 AC_{9}	—	January 11, 2007	Lulin	LUSS	·	980 m	MPC · JPL
703057	2007 AL_{11}	—	January 14, 2007	Altschwendt	W. Ries	·	1.8 km	MPC · JPL
703058	2007 AV_{13}	—	December 27, 2006	Kitt Peak	Spacewatch	·	960 m	MPC · JPL
703059	2007 AV_{15}	—	January 10, 2007	Mount Lemmon	Mount Lemmon Survey	NYS	1.0 km	MPC · JPL
703060	2007 AF_{29}	—	January 10, 2007	Mount Lemmon	Mount Lemmon Survey	V	680 m	MPC · JPL
703061	2007 AR_{32}	—	January 15, 2007	Mauna Kea	P. A. Wiegert	·	1.1 km	MPC · JPL
703062	2007 AF_{34}	—	October 9, 2015	Haleakala	Pan-STARRS 1	KOR	980 m	MPC · JPL
703063	2007 AT_{34}	—	January 10, 2007	Mount Lemmon	Mount Lemmon Survey	·	2.4 km	MPC · JPL
703064	2007 AL_{35}	—	April 16, 2020	Mount Lemmon	Mount Lemmon Survey	·	1.6 km	MPC · JPL
703065	2007 AG_{36}	—	November 24, 2006	Mount Lemmon	Mount Lemmon Survey	·	1.5 km	MPC · JPL
703066	2007 AC_{38}	—	March 31, 2019	Mount Lemmon	Mount Lemmon Survey	·	1.3 km	MPC · JPL
703067	2007 AO_{38}	—	July 1, 2016	Haleakala	Pan-STARRS 1	H	380 m	MPC · JPL
703068	2007 AS_{38}	—	February 28, 2003	Haleakala	NEAT	·	1.2 km	MPC · JPL
703069	2007 BZ_{9}	—	January 17, 2007	Kitt Peak	Spacewatch	V	550 m	MPC · JPL
703070	2007 BY_{12}	—	January 17, 2007	Kitt Peak	Spacewatch	·	1.0 km	MPC · JPL
703071	2007 BU_{13}	—	January 17, 2007	Kitt Peak	Spacewatch	·	1.3 km	MPC · JPL
703072	2007 BH_{23}	—	January 17, 2007	Kitt Peak	Spacewatch	KOR	1.1 km	MPC · JPL
703073	2007 BZ_{24}	—	November 28, 2006	Mount Lemmon	Mount Lemmon Survey	·	660 m	MPC · JPL
703074	2007 BH_{31}	—	December 15, 2001	Socorro	LINEAR	·	1.5 km	MPC · JPL
703075	2007 BQ_{35}	—	January 24, 2007	Mount Lemmon	Mount Lemmon Survey	·	1.5 km	MPC · JPL
703076	2007 BX_{47}	—	January 26, 2007	Kitt Peak	Spacewatch	·	1.3 km	MPC · JPL
703077	2007 BZ_{50}	—	January 24, 2007	Kitt Peak	Spacewatch	·	870 m	MPC · JPL
703078	2007 BT_{53}	—	January 24, 2007	Kitt Peak	Spacewatch	·	1.9 km	MPC · JPL
703079	2007 BH_{59}	—	January 17, 2007	Kitt Peak	Spacewatch	·	680 m	MPC · JPL
703080	2007 BH_{62}	—	January 27, 2007	Kitt Peak	Spacewatch	·	770 m	MPC · JPL
703081	2007 BK_{69}	—	January 27, 2007	Mount Lemmon	Mount Lemmon Survey	DOR	2.1 km	MPC · JPL
703082	2007 BS_{70}	—	January 10, 2007	Kitt Peak	Spacewatch	MRX	910 m	MPC · JPL
703083	2007 BY_{70}	—	January 28, 2007	Mount Lemmon	Mount Lemmon Survey	HOF	2.1 km	MPC · JPL
703084	2007 BD_{72}	—	January 28, 2007	Kitt Peak	Spacewatch	·	700 m	MPC · JPL
703085	2007 BY_{84}	—	November 20, 2006	Mount Lemmon	Mount Lemmon Survey	·	1.9 km	MPC · JPL
703086	2007 BA_{87}	—	October 27, 2005	Kitt Peak	Spacewatch	·	1.7 km	MPC · JPL
703087	2007 BS_{91}	—	December 21, 2006	Kitt Peak	L. H. Wasserman, M. W. Buie	·	880 m	MPC · JPL
703088	2007 BT_{93}	—	January 25, 2007	Kitt Peak	Spacewatch	·	1.1 km	MPC · JPL
703089	2007 BC_{104}	—	September 17, 2009	Kitt Peak	Spacewatch	·	880 m	MPC · JPL
703090	2007 BE_{104}	—	September 27, 2009	Mount Lemmon	Mount Lemmon Survey	MAS	610 m	MPC · JPL
703091	2007 BD_{105}	—	September 24, 2009	Kitt Peak	Spacewatch	·	880 m	MPC · JPL
703092	2007 BL_{105}	—	October 26, 2009	Mount Lemmon	Mount Lemmon Survey	·	1.1 km	MPC · JPL
703093	2007 BW_{105}	—	September 24, 2009	Mount Lemmon	Mount Lemmon Survey	NYS	1.1 km	MPC · JPL
703094	2007 BE_{106}	—	April 30, 2016	Haleakala	Pan-STARRS 1	·	1.2 km	MPC · JPL
703095	2007 BX_{106}	—	April 3, 2011	Haleakala	Pan-STARRS 1	·	1.1 km	MPC · JPL
703096	2007 BE_{107}	—	August 14, 2016	Haleakala	Pan-STARRS 1	V	530 m	MPC · JPL
703097	2007 BA_{110}	—	January 27, 2007	Mount Lemmon	Mount Lemmon Survey	·	1.6 km	MPC · JPL
703098	2007 BZ_{111}	—	March 31, 2013	Mount Lemmon	Mount Lemmon Survey	·	1.7 km	MPC · JPL
703099	2007 BJ_{112}	—	October 8, 2016	Haleakala	Pan-STARRS 1	·	2.3 km	MPC · JPL
703100	2007 BJ_{113}	—	May 3, 2008	Kitt Peak	Spacewatch	AGN	990 m	MPC · JPL

== 703101–703200 ==
back to top

Designation			Discovery			Properties		Ref
Permanent	Provisional	Named after	Date	Site	Discoverer(s)	Category	Diam.	Ref
703101	2007 BB_{115}	—	January 17, 2007	Kitt Peak	Spacewatch	·	2.2 km	MPC · JPL
703102	2007 BW_{115}	—	January 28, 2007	Mount Lemmon	Mount Lemmon Survey	·	1.6 km	MPC · JPL
703103	2007 BX_{117}	—	January 25, 2007	Kitt Peak	Spacewatch	·	1.2 km	MPC · JPL
703104	2007 BZ_{118}	—	January 17, 2007	Mount Lemmon	Mount Lemmon Survey	·	1.1 km	MPC · JPL
703105	2007 BN_{119}	—	January 17, 2007	Kitt Peak	Spacewatch	·	1.5 km	MPC · JPL
703106	2007 CW_{23}	—	February 7, 2007	Palomar	NEAT	H	590 m	MPC · JPL
703107	2007 CX_{28}	—	January 24, 2007	Catalina	CSS	·	2.3 km	MPC · JPL
703108	2007 CO_{39}	—	January 10, 2007	Kitt Peak	Spacewatch	DOR	2.5 km	MPC · JPL
703109	2007 CC_{64}	—	February 17, 2007	Kitt Peak	Spacewatch	·	2.6 km	MPC · JPL
703110	2007 CW_{75}	—	February 14, 2007	Mauna Kea	P. A. Wiegert	MAS	580 m	MPC · JPL
703111 Leejungpin	2007 CT_{78}	Leejungpin	February 6, 2007	Lulin	LUSS	·	900 m	MPC · JPL
703112	2007 CK_{80}	—	January 9, 2007	Kitt Peak	Spacewatch	·	930 m	MPC · JPL
703113	2007 CX_{80}	—	February 6, 2007	Mount Lemmon	Mount Lemmon Survey	·	1.0 km	MPC · JPL
703114	2007 CM_{81}	—	February 7, 2007	Kitt Peak	Spacewatch	NYS	960 m	MPC · JPL
703115	2007 DV_{6}	—	February 17, 2007	Mount Lemmon	Mount Lemmon Survey	·	1.0 km	MPC · JPL
703116	2007 DX_{19}	—	February 17, 2007	Kitt Peak	Spacewatch	·	1.5 km	MPC · JPL
703117	2007 DT_{23}	—	February 17, 2007	Kitt Peak	Spacewatch	·	1.6 km	MPC · JPL
703118	2007 DO_{44}	—	February 17, 2007	Mount Lemmon	Mount Lemmon Survey	·	2.1 km	MPC · JPL
703119	2007 DM_{47}	—	February 21, 2007	Mount Lemmon	Mount Lemmon Survey	MAS	630 m	MPC · JPL
703120	2007 DY_{60}	—	December 27, 2006	Mount Lemmon	Mount Lemmon Survey	H	490 m	MPC · JPL
703121	2007 DS_{63}	—	February 21, 2007	Kitt Peak	Spacewatch	·	2.2 km	MPC · JPL
703122	2007 DN_{66}	—	February 21, 2007	Kitt Peak	Spacewatch	·	1.1 km	MPC · JPL
703123	2007 DH_{68}	—	February 21, 2007	Kitt Peak	Spacewatch	·	770 m	MPC · JPL
703124	2007 DP_{68}	—	February 21, 2007	Kitt Peak	Spacewatch	BRA	1.4 km	MPC · JPL
703125	2007 DB_{71}	—	February 21, 2007	Kitt Peak	Spacewatch	·	1.8 km	MPC · JPL
703126	2007 DT_{72}	—	February 21, 2007	Kitt Peak	Spacewatch	NYS	900 m	MPC · JPL
703127	2007 DR_{73}	—	February 21, 2007	Kitt Peak	Spacewatch	·	1.2 km	MPC · JPL
703128	2007 DJ_{87}	—	February 23, 2007	Kitt Peak	Spacewatch	·	1.7 km	MPC · JPL
703129	2007 DM_{91}	—	August 23, 2003	Cerro Tololo	Deep Ecliptic Survey	·	2.7 km	MPC · JPL
703130	2007 DA_{102}	—	January 27, 2007	Kitt Peak	Spacewatch	·	550 m	MPC · JPL
703131	2007 DZ_{119}	—	March 28, 2011	Mount Lemmon	Mount Lemmon Survey	·	1.1 km	MPC · JPL
703132	2007 DU_{120}	—	February 17, 2007	Mount Lemmon	Mount Lemmon Survey	·	480 m	MPC · JPL
703133	2007 DX_{122}	—	August 16, 2009	Kitt Peak	Spacewatch	·	1.4 km	MPC · JPL
703134	2007 DC_{123}	—	February 25, 2007	Catalina	CSS	·	1.1 km	MPC · JPL
703135	2007 DG_{123}	—	February 25, 2007	Mount Lemmon	Mount Lemmon Survey	·	1 km	MPC · JPL
703136	2007 DN_{123}	—	September 27, 2009	Kitt Peak	Spacewatch	NEM	1.8 km	MPC · JPL
703137	2007 DW_{123}	—	May 7, 2014	Haleakala	Pan-STARRS 1	·	2.4 km	MPC · JPL
703138	2007 DX_{123}	—	September 12, 2009	Kitt Peak	Spacewatch	NYS	990 m	MPC · JPL
703139	2007 DS_{124}	—	February 21, 2007	Mount Lemmon	Mount Lemmon Survey	·	1 km	MPC · JPL
703140	2007 DQ_{127}	—	February 25, 2007	Kitt Peak	Spacewatch	·	1.4 km	MPC · JPL
703141	2007 DN_{128}	—	February 19, 2007	Mount Lemmon	Mount Lemmon Survey	·	1.7 km	MPC · JPL
703142	2007 DY_{130}	—	February 21, 2007	Mount Lemmon	Mount Lemmon Survey	EOS	1.3 km	MPC · JPL
703143	2007 DK_{132}	—	January 23, 2007	Bergisch Gladbach	W. Bickel	·	1.4 km	MPC · JPL
703144	2007 DP_{132}	—	February 23, 2007	Kitt Peak	Spacewatch	·	1.7 km	MPC · JPL
703145	2007 EE_{6}	—	September 10, 2004	Kitt Peak	Spacewatch	·	1.7 km	MPC · JPL
703146	2007 EO_{6}	—	February 21, 2007	Mount Lemmon	Mount Lemmon Survey	·	1.9 km	MPC · JPL
703147	2007 EF_{22}	—	February 23, 2007	Mount Lemmon	Mount Lemmon Survey	·	1.2 km	MPC · JPL
703148	2007 ER_{24}	—	March 10, 2007	Mount Lemmon	Mount Lemmon Survey	MAS	710 m	MPC · JPL
703149	2007 EM_{25}	—	March 10, 2007	Mount Lemmon	Mount Lemmon Survey	·	2.5 km	MPC · JPL
703150	2007 EM_{27}	—	January 28, 2007	Kitt Peak	Spacewatch	·	1.9 km	MPC · JPL
703151	2007 EN_{40}	—	March 12, 2007	Altschwendt	W. Ries	·	1.6 km	MPC · JPL
703152	2007 EZ_{40}	—	March 9, 2007	Kitt Peak	Spacewatch	·	2.1 km	MPC · JPL
703153	2007 EB_{55}	—	March 12, 2007	Mount Lemmon	Mount Lemmon Survey	·	1.0 km	MPC · JPL
703154	2007 EF_{56}	—	March 12, 2007	Kitt Peak	Spacewatch	VER	2.3 km	MPC · JPL
703155	2007 EJ_{60}	—	January 28, 2007	Kitt Peak	Spacewatch	·	560 m	MPC · JPL
703156	2007 EM_{61}	—	March 10, 2007	Kitt Peak	Spacewatch	·	2.1 km	MPC · JPL
703157	2007 EQ_{63}	—	February 25, 2007	Kitt Peak	Spacewatch	(18466)	1.9 km	MPC · JPL
703158	2007 ET_{68}	—	March 10, 2007	Kitt Peak	Spacewatch	·	1.8 km	MPC · JPL
703159	2007 ED_{70}	—	March 10, 2007	Mount Lemmon	Mount Lemmon Survey	·	2.2 km	MPC · JPL
703160	2007 EB_{73}	—	March 10, 2007	Mount Lemmon	Mount Lemmon Survey	·	1.8 km	MPC · JPL
703161	2007 EK_{73}	—	February 25, 2007	Kitt Peak	Spacewatch	·	2.1 km	MPC · JPL
703162	2007 EL_{91}	—	January 28, 2007	Mount Lemmon	Mount Lemmon Survey	·	960 m	MPC · JPL
703163	2007 EO_{93}	—	February 25, 2007	Mount Lemmon	Mount Lemmon Survey	·	480 m	MPC · JPL
703164	2007 EG_{95}	—	March 10, 2007	Mount Lemmon	Mount Lemmon Survey	·	1.1 km	MPC · JPL
703165	2007 EK_{103}	—	March 11, 2007	Mount Lemmon	Mount Lemmon Survey	·	2.5 km	MPC · JPL
703166	2007 EG_{111}	—	March 11, 2007	Kitt Peak	Spacewatch	H	450 m	MPC · JPL
703167	2007 EH_{116}	—	March 13, 2007	Mount Lemmon	Mount Lemmon Survey	·	1.1 km	MPC · JPL
703168	2007 EV_{121}	—	March 14, 2007	Mount Lemmon	Mount Lemmon Survey	·	1.1 km	MPC · JPL
703169	2007 EY_{123}	—	March 14, 2007	Mount Lemmon	Mount Lemmon Survey	·	1.4 km	MPC · JPL
703170	2007 EP_{131}	—	March 9, 2007	Mount Lemmon	Mount Lemmon Survey	·	2.6 km	MPC · JPL
703171	2007 EU_{143}	—	March 12, 2007	Kitt Peak	Spacewatch	·	2.1 km	MPC · JPL
703172	2007 EQ_{145}	—	March 12, 2007	Mount Lemmon	Mount Lemmon Survey	·	1.7 km	MPC · JPL
703173	2007 EE_{148}	—	March 12, 2007	Mount Lemmon	Mount Lemmon Survey	·	1.0 km	MPC · JPL
703174	2007 EY_{150}	—	March 12, 2007	Mount Lemmon	Mount Lemmon Survey	·	440 m	MPC · JPL
703175	2007 ES_{151}	—	March 12, 2007	Mount Lemmon	Mount Lemmon Survey	·	1.5 km	MPC · JPL
703176	2007 EG_{185}	—	March 14, 2007	Mount Lemmon	Mount Lemmon Survey	·	2.2 km	MPC · JPL
703177	2007 EJ_{187}	—	March 15, 2007	Mount Lemmon	Mount Lemmon Survey	·	1.6 km	MPC · JPL
703178	2007 ED_{189}	—	March 13, 2007	Mount Lemmon	Mount Lemmon Survey	·	930 m	MPC · JPL
703179	2007 ED_{202}	—	March 9, 2007	Kitt Peak	Spacewatch	·	1.9 km	MPC · JPL
703180	2007 EZ_{204}	—	March 11, 2007	Kitt Peak	Spacewatch	·	920 m	MPC · JPL
703181	2007 EJ_{205}	—	March 11, 2007	Kitt Peak	Spacewatch	·	1.2 km	MPC · JPL
703182	2007 EN_{209}	—	March 15, 2007	Mount Lemmon	Mount Lemmon Survey	MRX	840 m	MPC · JPL
703183	2007 EY_{225}	—	March 10, 2007	Mount Lemmon	Mount Lemmon Survey	·	1.3 km	MPC · JPL
703184	2007 EF_{226}	—	March 13, 2007	Kitt Peak	Spacewatch	·	970 m	MPC · JPL
703185	2007 EQ_{226}	—	January 27, 2003	Palomar	NEAT	·	1.1 km	MPC · JPL
703186	2007 EN_{227}	—	November 28, 2013	Mount Lemmon	Mount Lemmon Survey	·	1.2 km	MPC · JPL
703187	2007 EU_{227}	—	March 9, 2007	Kitt Peak	Spacewatch	·	600 m	MPC · JPL
703188	2007 EM_{230}	—	November 7, 2015	Haleakala	Pan-STARRS 1	·	490 m	MPC · JPL
703189	2007 EK_{231}	—	March 18, 2018	Haleakala	Pan-STARRS 1	·	2.0 km	MPC · JPL
703190	2007 EC_{232}	—	September 24, 2008	Kitt Peak	Spacewatch	H	420 m	MPC · JPL
703191	2007 EY_{232}	—	May 19, 2018	Haleakala	Pan-STARRS 1	·	1.5 km	MPC · JPL
703192	2007 EH_{233}	—	December 25, 2017	Haleakala	Pan-STARRS 1	·	2.5 km	MPC · JPL
703193	2007 EU_{233}	—	September 20, 2014	Haleakala	Pan-STARRS 1	·	2.0 km	MPC · JPL
703194	2007 EB_{234}	—	February 14, 2012	Haleakala	Pan-STARRS 1	EMA	2.2 km	MPC · JPL
703195	2007 EO_{234}	—	February 8, 2011	Mount Lemmon	Mount Lemmon Survey	MAR	660 m	MPC · JPL
703196	2007 ER_{234}	—	July 14, 2016	Mount Lemmon	Mount Lemmon Survey	·	1.1 km	MPC · JPL
703197	2007 EU_{234}	—	April 30, 2008	Kitt Peak	Spacewatch	L5	6.6 km	MPC · JPL
703198	2007 EH_{235}	—	July 8, 2014	Haleakala	Pan-STARRS 1	·	1.3 km	MPC · JPL
703199	2007 EQ_{235}	—	February 15, 2012	Haleakala	Pan-STARRS 1	TEL	930 m	MPC · JPL
703200	2007 ES_{235}	—	March 15, 2007	Kitt Peak	Spacewatch	L5 · (17492)	7.5 km	MPC · JPL

== 703201–703300 ==
back to top

Designation			Discovery			Properties		Ref
Permanent	Provisional	Named after	Date	Site	Discoverer(s)	Category	Diam.	Ref
703201	2007 EB_{236}	—	August 25, 2014	Haleakala	Pan-STARRS 1	·	1.5 km	MPC · JPL
703202	2007 EF_{236}	—	March 10, 2014	Mount Lemmon	Mount Lemmon Survey	·	700 m	MPC · JPL
703203	2007 EX_{236}	—	July 30, 2008	Mount Lemmon	Mount Lemmon Survey	·	1.6 km	MPC · JPL
703204	2007 EO_{243}	—	March 9, 2007	Mount Lemmon	Mount Lemmon Survey	HYG	1.9 km	MPC · JPL
703205	2007 EF_{244}	—	March 12, 2007	Mount Lemmon	Mount Lemmon Survey	EMA	2.2 km	MPC · JPL
703206	2007 FN_{5}	—	March 16, 2007	Kitt Peak	Spacewatch	·	1.5 km	MPC · JPL
703207	2007 FU_{12}	—	March 10, 2007	Palomar	NEAT	·	2.9 km	MPC · JPL
703208	2007 FC_{17}	—	October 19, 1999	Kitt Peak	Spacewatch	·	2.3 km	MPC · JPL
703209	2007 FN_{19}	—	March 20, 2007	Mount Lemmon	Mount Lemmon Survey	·	850 m	MPC · JPL
703210	2007 FX_{19}	—	October 25, 2005	Kitt Peak	Spacewatch	·	1.2 km	MPC · JPL
703211	2007 FA_{30}	—	March 20, 2007	Kitt Peak	Spacewatch	·	1.6 km	MPC · JPL
703212	2007 FA_{53}	—	March 25, 2007	Mount Lemmon	Mount Lemmon Survey	·	2.4 km	MPC · JPL
703213	2007 FH_{53}	—	November 19, 2009	Kitt Peak	Spacewatch	·	1.2 km	MPC · JPL
703214	2007 FZ_{55}	—	March 26, 2007	Mount Lemmon	Mount Lemmon Survey	·	2.1 km	MPC · JPL
703215	2007 FB_{56}	—	March 20, 2007	Catalina	CSS	TIR	2.7 km	MPC · JPL
703216	2007 FG_{56}	—	April 2, 2017	Haleakala	Pan-STARRS 1	KOR	1.1 km	MPC · JPL
703217	2007 FP_{56}	—	March 16, 2007	Kitt Peak	Spacewatch	·	1.9 km	MPC · JPL
703218	2007 FV_{57}	—	July 12, 2016	Mount Lemmon	Mount Lemmon Survey	·	1.1 km	MPC · JPL
703219	2007 FP_{58}	—	September 1, 2014	Mount Lemmon	Mount Lemmon Survey	·	1.4 km	MPC · JPL
703220	2007 FF_{59}	—	March 20, 2007	Mount Lemmon	Mount Lemmon Survey	·	2.2 km	MPC · JPL
703221	2007 FU_{63}	—	March 16, 2007	Kitt Peak	Spacewatch	(5)	900 m	MPC · JPL
703222	2007 GP_{20}	—	April 11, 2007	Mount Lemmon	Mount Lemmon Survey	·	2.2 km	MPC · JPL
703223	2007 GF_{43}	—	March 15, 2007	Kitt Peak	Spacewatch	·	1.9 km	MPC · JPL
703224	2007 GW_{44}	—	April 14, 2007	Kitt Peak	Spacewatch	·	2.1 km	MPC · JPL
703225	2007 GM_{53}	—	March 26, 2007	Kitt Peak	Spacewatch	·	790 m	MPC · JPL
703226	2007 GL_{54}	—	March 13, 2007	Mount Lemmon	Mount Lemmon Survey	·	1.1 km	MPC · JPL
703227	2007 GC_{65}	—	April 15, 2007	Kitt Peak	Spacewatch	·	520 m	MPC · JPL
703228	2007 GF_{66}	—	April 15, 2007	Kitt Peak	Spacewatch	LIX	3.0 km	MPC · JPL
703229	2007 GT_{67}	—	April 15, 2007	Kitt Peak	Spacewatch	·	570 m	MPC · JPL
703230	2007 GX_{77}	—	April 11, 2007	Mount Lemmon	Mount Lemmon Survey	3:2	4.4 km	MPC · JPL
703231	2007 GZ_{77}	—	April 14, 2007	Mount Lemmon	Mount Lemmon Survey	MAS	630 m	MPC · JPL
703232	2007 GD_{78}	—	October 26, 2009	Kitt Peak	Spacewatch	NYS	1.1 km	MPC · JPL
703233	2007 GN_{78}	—	March 30, 2016	Haleakala	Pan-STARRS 1	·	1.6 km	MPC · JPL
703234	2007 GQ_{78}	—	April 14, 2007	Kitt Peak	Spacewatch	·	2.3 km	MPC · JPL
703235	2007 GD_{79}	—	March 16, 2012	Kitt Peak	Spacewatch	·	1.9 km	MPC · JPL
703236	2007 GH_{79}	—	December 18, 2015	Mount Lemmon	Mount Lemmon Survey	·	1.9 km	MPC · JPL
703237	2007 HJ_{11}	—	April 18, 2007	Mount Lemmon	Mount Lemmon Survey	·	1.9 km	MPC · JPL
703238	2007 HL_{15}	—	March 12, 2007	Catalina	CSS	KON	2.1 km	MPC · JPL
703239	2007 HD_{19}	—	April 18, 2007	Kitt Peak	Spacewatch	·	890 m	MPC · JPL
703240	2007 HX_{19}	—	October 19, 2003	Kitt Peak	Spacewatch	·	2.1 km	MPC · JPL
703241	2007 HN_{20}	—	April 18, 2007	Kitt Peak	Spacewatch	EOS	1.5 km	MPC · JPL
703242	2007 HU_{22}	—	April 18, 2007	Kitt Peak	Spacewatch	EOS	1.5 km	MPC · JPL
703243	2007 HO_{31}	—	April 19, 2007	Kitt Peak	Spacewatch	·	2.0 km	MPC · JPL
703244	2007 HT_{43}	—	December 8, 2005	Kitt Peak	Spacewatch	·	1.0 km	MPC · JPL
703245	2007 HV_{44}	—	March 26, 2007	Mount Lemmon	Mount Lemmon Survey	·	1.8 km	MPC · JPL
703246	2007 HN_{45}	—	April 18, 2007	Kitt Peak	Spacewatch	MAR	890 m	MPC · JPL
703247	2007 HM_{47}	—	April 20, 2007	Kitt Peak	Spacewatch	·	2.6 km	MPC · JPL
703248	2007 HQ_{49}	—	April 20, 2007	Kitt Peak	Spacewatch	·	590 m	MPC · JPL
703249	2007 HF_{50}	—	April 20, 2007	Kitt Peak	Spacewatch	·	2.1 km	MPC · JPL
703250	2007 HA_{60}	—	April 18, 2007	Mount Lemmon	Mount Lemmon Survey	MAS	630 m	MPC · JPL
703251	2007 HT_{60}	—	April 20, 2007	Mount Lemmon	Mount Lemmon Survey	·	860 m	MPC · JPL
703252	2007 HV_{63}	—	April 22, 2007	Mount Lemmon	Mount Lemmon Survey	·	2.5 km	MPC · JPL
703253	2007 HM_{69}	—	March 14, 2007	Kitt Peak	Spacewatch	·	1.1 km	MPC · JPL
703254	2007 HH_{81}	—	April 25, 2007	Mount Lemmon	Mount Lemmon Survey	·	1.4 km	MPC · JPL
703255	2007 HA_{100}	—	April 20, 2007	Mount Lemmon	Mount Lemmon Survey	·	2.4 km	MPC · JPL
703256	2007 HX_{100}	—	October 29, 2008	Mount Lemmon	Mount Lemmon Survey	·	710 m	MPC · JPL
703257	2007 HN_{101}	—	April 1, 2011	Kitt Peak	Spacewatch	(5)	1.1 km	MPC · JPL
703258	2007 HQ_{101}	—	April 13, 2015	Haleakala	Pan-STARRS 1	T_{j} (2.94) · 3:2	5.2 km	MPC · JPL
703259	2007 HB_{102}	—	April 24, 2007	Kitt Peak	Spacewatch	·	1.1 km	MPC · JPL
703260	2007 HZ_{102}	—	March 29, 2012	Kitt Peak	Spacewatch	·	1.9 km	MPC · JPL
703261	2007 HL_{103}	—	April 25, 2007	Kitt Peak	Spacewatch	·	2.2 km	MPC · JPL
703262	2007 HX_{104}	—	October 22, 2014	Mount Lemmon	Mount Lemmon Survey	·	1.8 km	MPC · JPL
703263	2007 HD_{105}	—	March 15, 2007	Mount Lemmon	Mount Lemmon Survey	·	2.3 km	MPC · JPL
703264	2007 HN_{105}	—	September 3, 2008	Kitt Peak	Spacewatch	·	2.1 km	MPC · JPL
703265	2007 HC_{106}	—	August 27, 2014	Haleakala	Pan-STARRS 1	·	2.0 km	MPC · JPL
703266	2007 HQ_{106}	—	March 7, 2017	Haleakala	Pan-STARRS 1	·	640 m	MPC · JPL
703267	2007 HV_{106}	—	March 27, 2015	Kitt Peak	Spacewatch	·	1.3 km	MPC · JPL
703268	2007 HA_{107}	—	December 4, 2015	Haleakala	Pan-STARRS 1	·	540 m	MPC · JPL
703269	2007 HB_{107}	—	January 30, 2017	Mount Lemmon	Mount Lemmon Survey	TIR	2.2 km	MPC · JPL
703270	2007 HL_{107}	—	April 24, 2007	Mount Lemmon	Mount Lemmon Survey	URS	2.5 km	MPC · JPL
703271	2007 HS_{107}	—	April 18, 2007	Kitt Peak	Spacewatch	·	2.6 km	MPC · JPL
703272	2007 HG_{109}	—	April 3, 2017	Haleakala	Pan-STARRS 1	·	1.8 km	MPC · JPL
703273	2007 HL_{109}	—	April 19, 2007	Kitt Peak	Spacewatch	·	1.9 km	MPC · JPL
703274	2007 HN_{110}	—	April 19, 2007	Kitt Peak	Spacewatch	·	770 m	MPC · JPL
703275	2007 HT_{111}	—	April 25, 2007	Mount Lemmon	Mount Lemmon Survey	MAR	980 m	MPC · JPL
703276	2007 HJ_{112}	—	April 20, 2007	Kitt Peak	Spacewatch	·	500 m	MPC · JPL
703277	2007 HR_{114}	—	April 16, 2007	Mount Lemmon	Mount Lemmon Survey	·	540 m	MPC · JPL
703278	2007 HW_{114}	—	April 18, 2007	Mount Lemmon	Mount Lemmon Survey	KOR	1 km	MPC · JPL
703279	2007 HX_{115}	—	April 22, 2007	Kitt Peak	Spacewatch	·	1.5 km	MPC · JPL
703280	2007 HR_{117}	—	April 24, 2007	Kitt Peak	Spacewatch	·	1.0 km	MPC · JPL
703281	2007 JH_{12}	—	April 25, 2007	Mount Lemmon	Mount Lemmon Survey	·	1.4 km	MPC · JPL
703282	2007 JW_{12}	—	May 7, 2007	Kitt Peak	Spacewatch	·	2.1 km	MPC · JPL
703283	2007 JB_{14}	—	October 20, 2003	Kitt Peak	Spacewatch	·	2.6 km	MPC · JPL
703284	2007 JX_{14}	—	April 20, 2007	Mount Lemmon	Mount Lemmon Survey	·	2.4 km	MPC · JPL
703285	2007 JU_{16}	—	May 7, 2007	Kitt Peak	Spacewatch	·	670 m	MPC · JPL
703286	2007 JJ_{19}	—	May 10, 2007	Kitt Peak	Spacewatch	·	940 m	MPC · JPL
703287	2007 JQ_{20}	—	September 18, 2003	Kitt Peak	Spacewatch	·	1.9 km	MPC · JPL
703288	2007 JH_{23}	—	May 7, 2007	Kitt Peak	Spacewatch	·	1.2 km	MPC · JPL
703289	2007 JA_{28}	—	May 10, 2007	Kitt Peak	Spacewatch	THM	1.7 km	MPC · JPL
703290	2007 JE_{30}	—	May 11, 2007	Mount Lemmon	Mount Lemmon Survey	·	810 m	MPC · JPL
703291	2007 JS_{40}	—	May 12, 2007	Mount Lemmon	Mount Lemmon Survey	·	1.3 km	MPC · JPL
703292	2007 JW_{48}	—	May 12, 2007	Mount Lemmon	Mount Lemmon Survey	·	2.1 km	MPC · JPL
703293	2007 JC_{49}	—	May 16, 2013	Haleakala	Pan-STARRS 1	·	2.6 km	MPC · JPL
703294	2007 JF_{49}	—	May 9, 2007	Mount Lemmon	Mount Lemmon Survey	·	2.6 km	MPC · JPL
703295	2007 JT_{49}	—	July 1, 2013	Haleakala	Pan-STARRS 1	·	2.2 km	MPC · JPL
703296	2007 KC_{3}	—	May 11, 2007	Kitt Peak	Spacewatch	T_{j} (2.99)	2.7 km	MPC · JPL
703297	2007 KZ_{3}	—	May 10, 2007	Mount Lemmon	Mount Lemmon Survey	·	600 m	MPC · JPL
703298	2007 KB_{4}	—	May 9, 2007	Kitt Peak	Spacewatch	·	2.2 km	MPC · JPL
703299	2007 KW_{5}	—	May 24, 2007	Mount Lemmon	Mount Lemmon Survey	HYG	2.3 km	MPC · JPL
703300	2007 KD_{6}	—	May 10, 2007	Mount Lemmon	Mount Lemmon Survey	·	2.5 km	MPC · JPL

== 703301–703400 ==
back to top

Designation			Discovery			Properties		Ref
Permanent	Provisional	Named after	Date	Site	Discoverer(s)	Category	Diam.	Ref
703301	2007 KA_{10}	—	October 18, 2012	Haleakala	Pan-STARRS 1	(5)	900 m	MPC · JPL
703302	2007 KL_{10}	—	April 21, 2013	Haleakala	Pan-STARRS 1	·	2.6 km	MPC · JPL
703303	2007 KQ_{10}	—	March 18, 2018	Haleakala	Pan-STARRS 1	·	2.4 km	MPC · JPL
703304	2007 KU_{10}	—	March 18, 2018	Haleakala	Pan-STARRS 1	·	2.0 km	MPC · JPL
703305	2007 KM_{11}	—	February 21, 2017	Mount Lemmon	Mount Lemmon Survey	·	2.0 km	MPC · JPL
703306	2007 KR_{11}	—	May 25, 2007	Mount Lemmon	Mount Lemmon Survey	·	560 m	MPC · JPL
703307	2007 LH_{6}	—	June 8, 2007	Kitt Peak	Spacewatch	·	3.1 km	MPC · JPL
703308	2007 LA_{11}	—	June 9, 2007	Kitt Peak	Spacewatch	HYG	2.3 km	MPC · JPL
703309	2007 LN_{16}	—	June 10, 2007	Kitt Peak	Spacewatch	·	2.3 km	MPC · JPL
703310	2007 LZ_{19}	—	June 9, 2007	Kitt Peak	Spacewatch	·	1.0 km	MPC · JPL
703311	2007 LY_{22}	—	June 13, 2007	Kitt Peak	Spacewatch	·	2.2 km	MPC · JPL
703312	2007 LV_{27}	—	April 24, 2007	Mount Lemmon	Mount Lemmon Survey	·	990 m	MPC · JPL
703313	2007 LZ_{30}	—	June 12, 2007	Mauna Kea	D. D. Balam, K. M. Perrett	·	3.1 km	MPC · JPL
703314	2007 LC_{39}	—	December 24, 2014	Mount Lemmon	Mount Lemmon Survey	·	2.9 km	MPC · JPL
703315	2007 LD_{39}	—	June 9, 2007	Kitt Peak	Spacewatch	·	2.6 km	MPC · JPL
703316	2007 MW_{1}	—	February 1, 2006	Mount Lemmon	Mount Lemmon Survey	·	2.2 km	MPC · JPL
703317	2007 MT_{6}	—	April 25, 2007	Kitt Peak	Spacewatch	·	1.1 km	MPC · JPL
703318	2007 MO_{11}	—	June 21, 2007	Mount Lemmon	Mount Lemmon Survey	·	2.8 km	MPC · JPL
703319	2007 MF_{18}	—	June 21, 2007	Mount Lemmon	Mount Lemmon Survey	·	1.5 km	MPC · JPL
703320	2007 MX_{21}	—	May 22, 2007	Mount Lemmon	Mount Lemmon Survey	·	2.0 km	MPC · JPL
703321	2007 MT_{23}	—	June 22, 2007	Kitt Peak	Spacewatch	·	760 m	MPC · JPL
703322	2007 MU_{23}	—	June 22, 2007	Kitt Peak	Spacewatch	·	3.5 km	MPC · JPL
703323	2007 MD_{28}	—	June 8, 2012	Mount Lemmon	Mount Lemmon Survey	HYG	2.1 km	MPC · JPL
703324	2007 ME_{28}	—	October 8, 2008	Kitt Peak	Spacewatch	·	1.7 km	MPC · JPL
703325	2007 MK_{28}	—	April 15, 2012	Haleakala	Pan-STARRS 1	·	2.0 km	MPC · JPL
703326	2007 MO_{28}	—	February 8, 2011	Mount Lemmon	Mount Lemmon Survey	·	2.4 km	MPC · JPL
703327	2007 MU_{28}	—	December 11, 2014	Mount Lemmon	Mount Lemmon Survey	·	2.4 km	MPC · JPL
703328	2007 MZ_{28}	—	November 20, 2014	Haleakala	Pan-STARRS 1	·	2.6 km	MPC · JPL
703329	2007 MC_{29}	—	January 13, 2016	Mount Lemmon	Mount Lemmon Survey	·	2.0 km	MPC · JPL
703330	2007 MO_{29}	—	December 3, 2015	Mount Lemmon	Mount Lemmon Survey	·	2.9 km	MPC · JPL
703331	2007 MX_{29}	—	June 17, 2007	Kitt Peak	Spacewatch	·	630 m	MPC · JPL
703332	2007 MB_{30}	—	November 7, 2008	Mount Lemmon	Mount Lemmon Survey	·	2.2 km	MPC · JPL
703333	2007 MG_{30}	—	October 9, 2008	Mount Lemmon	Mount Lemmon Survey	·	2.1 km	MPC · JPL
703334	2007 MH_{30}	—	April 20, 2012	Mount Lemmon	Mount Lemmon Survey	·	2.1 km	MPC · JPL
703335	2007 NX_{4}	—	July 15, 2007	Siding Spring	SSS	·	1.2 km	MPC · JPL
703336	2007 NU_{7}	—	July 15, 2007	Siding Spring	SSS	·	1.5 km	MPC · JPL
703337	2007 OO_{1}	—	July 18, 2007	Vallemare Borbona	V. S. Casulli	·	1.5 km	MPC · JPL
703338	2007 OZ_{1}	—	July 19, 2007	Tiki	Teamo, N., S. F. Hönig	·	1.1 km	MPC · JPL
703339	2007 OH_{2}	—	July 9, 2007	Lulin	LUSS	·	2.8 km	MPC · JPL
703340	2007 OL_{11}	—	July 18, 2007	Mount Lemmon	Mount Lemmon Survey	ADE	1.8 km	MPC · JPL
703341	2007 PR_{2}	—	August 8, 2007	7300	W. K. Y. Yeung	MAS	590 m	MPC · JPL
703342	2007 PE_{3}	—	June 20, 2007	Siding Spring	SSS	PHO	840 m	MPC · JPL
703343	2007 PC_{6}	—	August 6, 2007	Socorro	LINEAR	·	750 m	MPC · JPL
703344	2007 PU_{10}	—	August 11, 2007	Socorro	LINEAR	·	860 m	MPC · JPL
703345	2007 PO_{11}	—	August 9, 2007	Socorro	LINEAR	·	690 m	MPC · JPL
703346	2007 PH_{14}	—	August 8, 2007	Socorro	LINEAR	·	1.1 km	MPC · JPL
703347	2007 PA_{16}	—	August 8, 2007	Socorro	LINEAR	·	860 m	MPC · JPL
703348	2007 PR_{21}	—	August 9, 2007	Socorro	LINEAR	·	1.8 km	MPC · JPL
703349	2007 PN_{22}	—	August 10, 2007	La Cañada	Lacruz, J.	·	2.1 km	MPC · JPL
703350	2007 PY_{33}	—	August 10, 2007	Kitt Peak	Spacewatch	·	1.5 km	MPC · JPL
703351	2007 PM_{39}	—	August 15, 2007	Altschwendt	W. Ries	EOS	1.7 km	MPC · JPL
703352	2007 PF_{42}	—	August 11, 2007	Anderson Mesa	LONEOS	·	570 m	MPC · JPL
703353	2007 PH_{48}	—	August 15, 2007	Črni Vrh	Skvarč, J.	·	2.4 km	MPC · JPL
703354	2007 PN_{48}	—	September 13, 2007	Mount Lemmon	Mount Lemmon Survey	·	750 m	MPC · JPL
703355	2007 PM_{51}	—	February 22, 2014	Haleakala	Pan-STARRS 1	·	1.2 km	MPC · JPL
703356	2007 PP_{51}	—	May 14, 2015	Haleakala	Pan-STARRS 1	·	1.3 km	MPC · JPL
703357	2007 PD_{53}	—	August 10, 2007	Kitt Peak	Spacewatch	·	2.1 km	MPC · JPL
703358	2007 PM_{53}	—	August 10, 2007	Kitt Peak	Spacewatch	HYG	2.0 km	MPC · JPL
703359	2007 PX_{53}	—	August 10, 2007	Kitt Peak	Spacewatch	·	1.1 km	MPC · JPL
703360	2007 PL_{54}	—	August 9, 2007	Kitt Peak	Spacewatch	·	1.0 km	MPC · JPL
703361	2007 QR_{2}	—	August 21, 2007	Pla D'Arguines	R. Ferrando, Ferrando, M.	·	2.7 km	MPC · JPL
703362	2007 QL_{7}	—	August 23, 2007	Kitt Peak	Spacewatch	·	1.6 km	MPC · JPL
703363	2007 QD_{12}	—	October 5, 2003	Kitt Peak	Spacewatch	JUN	890 m	MPC · JPL
703364	2007 QG_{15}	—	August 23, 2007	Kitt Peak	Spacewatch	·	2.2 km	MPC · JPL
703365	2007 QH_{16}	—	August 23, 2007	Kitt Peak	Spacewatch	·	2.7 km	MPC · JPL
703366	2007 QK_{18}	—	August 23, 2007	Kitt Peak	Spacewatch	·	1.5 km	MPC · JPL
703367	2007 QQ_{18}	—	February 10, 2016	Haleakala	Pan-STARRS 1	·	2.8 km	MPC · JPL
703368	2007 QW_{18}	—	August 23, 2007	Kitt Peak	Spacewatch	·	2.8 km	MPC · JPL
703369	2007 QZ_{20}	—	August 24, 2007	Kitt Peak	Spacewatch	·	2.1 km	MPC · JPL
703370	2007 RZ	—	September 3, 2007	Eskridge	G. Hug	·	1.7 km	MPC · JPL
703371	2007 RA_{5}	—	September 1, 2007	Siding Spring	K. Sárneczky, L. Kiss	·	650 m	MPC · JPL
703372	2007 RY_{7}	—	September 6, 2007	Siding Spring	K. Sárneczky, L. Kiss	·	1.1 km	MPC · JPL
703373	2007 RG_{11}	—	September 5, 2007	Siding Spring	K. Sárneczky, L. Kiss	·	850 m	MPC · JPL
703374	2007 RB_{12}	—	September 3, 2007	Catalina	CSS	·	2.8 km	MPC · JPL
703375	2007 RC_{13}	—	September 2, 2007	Catalina	CSS	·	1.4 km	MPC · JPL
703376	2007 RR_{14}	—	September 11, 2007	Dauban	F. Kugel, C. Rinner	·	550 m	MPC · JPL
703377	2007 RF_{22}	—	September 3, 2007	Catalina	CSS	·	1.5 km	MPC · JPL
703378	2007 RX_{25}	—	September 4, 2007	Mount Lemmon	Mount Lemmon Survey	·	1.0 km	MPC · JPL
703379	2007 RS_{26}	—	September 4, 2007	Mount Lemmon	Mount Lemmon Survey	VER	2.3 km	MPC · JPL
703380	2007 RW_{35}	—	March 5, 2006	Kitt Peak	Spacewatch	JUN	900 m	MPC · JPL
703381	2007 RP_{41}	—	September 9, 2007	Anderson Mesa	LONEOS	·	2.3 km	MPC · JPL
703382	2007 RD_{44}	—	September 9, 2007	Kitt Peak	Spacewatch	·	1.3 km	MPC · JPL
703383	2007 RJ_{44}	—	November 29, 2003	Kitt Peak	Spacewatch	·	1.1 km	MPC · JPL
703384	2007 RV_{45}	—	September 9, 2007	Kitt Peak	Spacewatch	WIT	780 m	MPC · JPL
703385	2007 RE_{54}	—	September 9, 2007	Kitt Peak	Spacewatch	·	1.6 km	MPC · JPL
703386	2007 RD_{56}	—	September 9, 2007	Kitt Peak	Spacewatch	·	1.6 km	MPC · JPL
703387	2007 RJ_{57}	—	September 9, 2007	Kitt Peak	Spacewatch	·	3.0 km	MPC · JPL
703388	2007 RM_{57}	—	September 9, 2007	Kitt Peak	Spacewatch	·	740 m	MPC · JPL
703389	2007 RN_{61}	—	September 10, 2007	Mount Lemmon	Mount Lemmon Survey	·	2.9 km	MPC · JPL
703390	2007 RJ_{62}	—	March 12, 2005	Kitt Peak	Spacewatch	KOR	1.1 km	MPC · JPL
703391	2007 RR_{62}	—	September 10, 2007	Mount Lemmon	Mount Lemmon Survey	·	2.1 km	MPC · JPL
703392	2007 RS_{63}	—	August 10, 2007	Kitt Peak	Spacewatch	·	1.6 km	MPC · JPL
703393	2007 RF_{66}	—	September 10, 2007	Mount Lemmon	Mount Lemmon Survey	·	1.6 km	MPC · JPL
703394	2007 RP_{67}	—	August 10, 2007	Kitt Peak	Spacewatch	·	1.2 km	MPC · JPL
703395	2007 RD_{71}	—	September 30, 2003	Kitt Peak	Spacewatch	(5)	990 m	MPC · JPL
703396	2007 RG_{74}	—	September 30, 2003	Kitt Peak	Spacewatch	·	1.6 km	MPC · JPL
703397	2007 RV_{84}	—	September 10, 2007	Mount Lemmon	Mount Lemmon Survey	·	1.2 km	MPC · JPL
703398	2007 RX_{85}	—	September 10, 2007	Mount Lemmon	Mount Lemmon Survey	·	2.6 km	MPC · JPL
703399	2007 RK_{90}	—	September 10, 2007	Mount Lemmon	Mount Lemmon Survey	HYG	1.8 km	MPC · JPL
703400	2007 RM_{90}	—	May 23, 2006	Kitt Peak	Spacewatch	·	2.6 km	MPC · JPL

== 703401–703500 ==
back to top

Designation			Discovery			Properties		Ref
Permanent	Provisional	Named after	Date	Site	Discoverer(s)	Category	Diam.	Ref
703401	2007 RR_{90}	—	September 10, 2007	Mount Lemmon	Mount Lemmon Survey	EOS	1.9 km	MPC · JPL
703402	2007 RP_{93}	—	April 5, 2003	Kitt Peak	Spacewatch	·	550 m	MPC · JPL
703403	2007 RF_{96}	—	September 10, 2007	Kitt Peak	Spacewatch	·	1.4 km	MPC · JPL
703404	2007 RX_{98}	—	September 10, 2007	Kitt Peak	Spacewatch	·	1.3 km	MPC · JPL
703405	2007 RV_{101}	—	September 11, 2007	Mount Lemmon	Mount Lemmon Survey	·	590 m	MPC · JPL
703406	2007 RZ_{102}	—	September 11, 2007	Kitt Peak	Spacewatch	·	1.3 km	MPC · JPL
703407	2007 RT_{108}	—	September 11, 2007	Kitt Peak	Spacewatch	·	1.4 km	MPC · JPL
703408	2007 RF_{112}	—	September 11, 2007	Mount Lemmon	Mount Lemmon Survey	·	3.0 km	MPC · JPL
703409	2007 RJ_{113}	—	September 11, 2007	Kitt Peak	Spacewatch	VER	2.2 km	MPC · JPL
703410	2007 RF_{115}	—	September 11, 2007	Kitt Peak	Spacewatch	·	1.3 km	MPC · JPL
703411	2007 RT_{120}	—	September 19, 2003	Anderson Mesa	LONEOS	·	1.2 km	MPC · JPL
703412	2007 RO_{132}	—	September 13, 2007	Mount Lemmon	Mount Lemmon Survey	·	620 m	MPC · JPL
703413	2007 RN_{141}	—	September 13, 2007	Mount Lemmon	Mount Lemmon Survey	·	1.2 km	MPC · JPL
703414	2007 RH_{148}	—	September 5, 2007	Catalina	CSS	·	1.5 km	MPC · JPL
703415	2007 RX_{154}	—	September 10, 2007	Mount Lemmon	Mount Lemmon Survey	TIR	2.5 km	MPC · JPL
703416	2007 RR_{156}	—	August 24, 2007	Kitt Peak	Spacewatch	·	2.6 km	MPC · JPL
703417	2007 RV_{160}	—	September 12, 2007	Catalina	CSS	JUN	930 m	MPC · JPL
703418	2007 RV_{164}	—	September 10, 2007	Kitt Peak	Spacewatch	·	1.3 km	MPC · JPL
703419	2007 RD_{165}	—	September 10, 2007	Kitt Peak	Spacewatch	615	990 m	MPC · JPL
703420	2007 RL_{166}	—	March 10, 2005	Mount Lemmon	Mount Lemmon Survey	·	1.5 km	MPC · JPL
703421	2007 RT_{168}	—	September 10, 2007	Kitt Peak	Spacewatch	·	1.3 km	MPC · JPL
703422	2007 RZ_{169}	—	September 10, 2007	Kitt Peak	Spacewatch	EOS	1.6 km	MPC · JPL
703423	2007 RG_{173}	—	March 8, 2005	Mount Lemmon	Mount Lemmon Survey	·	1.5 km	MPC · JPL
703424	2007 RG_{175}	—	September 10, 2007	Kitt Peak	Spacewatch	AGN	880 m	MPC · JPL
703425	2007 RM_{175}	—	September 10, 2007	Kitt Peak	Spacewatch	·	1.2 km	MPC · JPL
703426	2007 RC_{176}	—	September 9, 2007	Mount Lemmon	Mount Lemmon Survey	·	830 m	MPC · JPL
703427	2007 RQ_{176}	—	September 10, 2007	Mount Lemmon	Mount Lemmon Survey	·	1.1 km	MPC · JPL
703428	2007 RG_{182}	—	September 12, 2007	Mount Lemmon	Mount Lemmon Survey	·	1.3 km	MPC · JPL
703429	2007 RN_{182}	—	September 12, 2007	Mount Lemmon	Mount Lemmon Survey	·	1.5 km	MPC · JPL
703430	2007 RX_{183}	—	September 13, 2007	Mount Lemmon	Mount Lemmon Survey	·	2.7 km	MPC · JPL
703431	2007 RE_{185}	—	September 13, 2007	Mount Lemmon	Mount Lemmon Survey	(895)	2.9 km	MPC · JPL
703432	2007 RY_{187}	—	September 13, 2007	Mount Lemmon	Mount Lemmon Survey	·	1.2 km	MPC · JPL
703433	2007 RZ_{192}	—	September 12, 2007	Kitt Peak	Spacewatch	·	580 m	MPC · JPL
703434	2007 RS_{193}	—	September 12, 2007	Kitt Peak	Spacewatch	THM	2.1 km	MPC · JPL
703435	2007 RD_{195}	—	September 12, 2007	Kitt Peak	Spacewatch	·	1.5 km	MPC · JPL
703436	2007 RW_{200}	—	September 13, 2007	Kitt Peak	Spacewatch	·	1.3 km	MPC · JPL
703437	2007 RE_{202}	—	September 13, 2007	Kitt Peak	Spacewatch	·	2.0 km	MPC · JPL
703438	2007 RT_{206}	—	September 10, 2007	Kitt Peak	Spacewatch	·	1.3 km	MPC · JPL
703439	2007 RS_{209}	—	September 10, 2007	Kitt Peak	Spacewatch	VER	2.4 km	MPC · JPL
703440	2007 RF_{214}	—	September 12, 2007	Kitt Peak	Spacewatch	PAD	1.1 km	MPC · JPL
703441	2007 RQ_{214}	—	September 12, 2007	Kitt Peak	Spacewatch	·	3.1 km	MPC · JPL
703442	2007 RT_{215}	—	September 12, 2007	Kitt Peak	Spacewatch	·	1.6 km	MPC · JPL
703443	2007 RQ_{218}	—	September 14, 2007	Mount Lemmon	Mount Lemmon Survey	·	1.2 km	MPC · JPL
703444	2007 RX_{223}	—	September 10, 2007	Kitt Peak	Spacewatch	·	1.1 km	MPC · JPL
703445	2007 RL_{225}	—	September 10, 2007	Kitt Peak	Spacewatch	·	2.4 km	MPC · JPL
703446	2007 RN_{225}	—	September 10, 2007	Kitt Peak	Spacewatch	·	1.3 km	MPC · JPL
703447	2007 RS_{228}	—	January 19, 2005	Kitt Peak	Spacewatch	·	3.2 km	MPC · JPL
703448	2007 RS_{229}	—	September 11, 2007	Kitt Peak	Spacewatch	·	520 m	MPC · JPL
703449	2007 RS_{234}	—	September 12, 2007	Mount Lemmon	Mount Lemmon Survey	·	2.8 km	MPC · JPL
703450	2007 RY_{234}	—	April 5, 2003	Kitt Peak	Spacewatch	·	630 m	MPC · JPL
703451	2007 RP_{238}	—	September 4, 2007	Catalina	CSS	·	3.2 km	MPC · JPL
703452	2007 RG_{250}	—	September 13, 2007	Kitt Peak	Spacewatch	·	1.8 km	MPC · JPL
703453	2007 RM_{250}	—	September 13, 2007	Kitt Peak	Spacewatch	·	1.2 km	MPC · JPL
703454	2007 RT_{250}	—	September 13, 2007	Kitt Peak	Spacewatch	WIT	720 m	MPC · JPL
703455	2007 RY_{252}	—	February 26, 2014	Haleakala	Pan-STARRS 1	·	1.5 km	MPC · JPL
703456	2007 RF_{259}	—	September 14, 2007	Mount Lemmon	Mount Lemmon Survey	·	740 m	MPC · JPL
703457	2007 RE_{266}	—	September 15, 2007	Mount Lemmon	Mount Lemmon Survey	·	1.4 km	MPC · JPL
703458	2007 RC_{268}	—	September 8, 2007	Anderson Mesa	LONEOS	NYS	920 m	MPC · JPL
703459	2007 RH_{280}	—	December 30, 2003	Needville	Casady, L., Dillon, W. G.	·	1.1 km	MPC · JPL
703460	2007 RQ_{280}	—	September 13, 2007	Catalina	CSS	(1547)	1.6 km	MPC · JPL
703461	2007 RQ_{282}	—	September 14, 2007	Catalina	CSS	·	1.6 km	MPC · JPL
703462	2007 RW_{286}	—	September 5, 2007	Catalina	CSS	JUN	950 m	MPC · JPL
703463	2007 RT_{297}	—	September 3, 2007	Catalina	CSS	MAS	780 m	MPC · JPL
703464	2007 RP_{303}	—	September 14, 2007	Mauna Kea	P. A. Wiegert	·	1.9 km	MPC · JPL
703465	2007 RX_{307}	—	September 13, 2007	Mount Lemmon	Mount Lemmon Survey	·	1.4 km	MPC · JPL
703466	2007 RN_{312}	—	September 13, 2007	Catalina	CSS	·	2.9 km	MPC · JPL
703467	2007 RW_{312}	—	September 3, 2007	Catalina	CSS	ADE	1.6 km	MPC · JPL
703468	2007 RA_{316}	—	September 13, 2007	Kitt Peak	Spacewatch	·	1.5 km	MPC · JPL
703469	2007 RN_{328}	—	September 10, 2007	Kitt Peak	Spacewatch	·	2.5 km	MPC · JPL
703470	2007 RP_{328}	—	September 13, 2007	Mount Lemmon	Mount Lemmon Survey	·	2.6 km	MPC · JPL
703471	2007 RW_{328}	—	September 10, 2007	Kitt Peak	Spacewatch	·	630 m	MPC · JPL
703472	2007 RZ_{328}	—	September 13, 2007	Kitt Peak	Spacewatch	·	1.2 km	MPC · JPL
703473	2007 RR_{329}	—	September 4, 2007	Catalina	CSS	·	640 m	MPC · JPL
703474	2007 RY_{329}	—	September 10, 2007	Mount Lemmon	Mount Lemmon Survey	·	940 m	MPC · JPL
703475	2007 RH_{333}	—	March 25, 2006	Kitt Peak	Spacewatch	·	2.5 km	MPC · JPL
703476	2007 RJ_{333}	—	September 10, 2007	Mount Lemmon	Mount Lemmon Survey	·	2.6 km	MPC · JPL
703477	2007 RS_{333}	—	March 7, 2017	Haleakala	Pan-STARRS 1	·	2.6 km	MPC · JPL
703478	2007 RU_{333}	—	September 14, 2007	Kitt Peak	Spacewatch	·	1.4 km	MPC · JPL
703479	2007 RN_{334}	—	October 13, 2016	Mount Lemmon	Mount Lemmon Survey	·	1.4 km	MPC · JPL
703480	2007 RJ_{335}	—	September 13, 2007	Kitt Peak	Spacewatch	·	820 m	MPC · JPL
703481	2007 RM_{338}	—	March 29, 2011	Mount Lemmon	Mount Lemmon Survey	·	2.7 km	MPC · JPL
703482	2007 RN_{338}	—	November 7, 2008	Mount Lemmon	Mount Lemmon Survey	·	2.8 km	MPC · JPL
703483	2007 RY_{338}	—	September 12, 2007	Mount Lemmon	Mount Lemmon Survey	·	2.5 km	MPC · JPL
703484	2007 RZ_{338}	—	September 4, 2007	Mount Lemmon	Mount Lemmon Survey	·	1.7 km	MPC · JPL
703485	2007 RB_{339}	—	February 3, 2017	Haleakala	Pan-STARRS 1	·	2.4 km	MPC · JPL
703486	2007 RF_{339}	—	January 11, 2010	Kitt Peak	Spacewatch	VER	2.4 km	MPC · JPL
703487	2007 RH_{339}	—	September 28, 2008	Mount Lemmon	Mount Lemmon Survey	L4	7.7 km	MPC · JPL
703488	2007 RL_{339}	—	January 9, 2016	Haleakala	Pan-STARRS 1	ELF	2.9 km	MPC · JPL
703489	2007 RP_{339}	—	September 11, 2007	Mount Lemmon	Mount Lemmon Survey	·	2.8 km	MPC · JPL
703490	2007 RS_{339}	—	September 15, 2007	Mount Lemmon	Mount Lemmon Survey	·	3.2 km	MPC · JPL
703491	2007 RO_{340}	—	August 15, 2013	Haleakala	Pan-STARRS 1	·	2.4 km	MPC · JPL
703492	2007 RR_{340}	—	November 2, 2013	Mount Lemmon	Mount Lemmon Survey	·	1.7 km	MPC · JPL
703493	2007 RW_{340}	—	September 4, 2007	Mount Lemmon	Mount Lemmon Survey	·	2.7 km	MPC · JPL
703494	2007 RY_{340}	—	September 9, 2007	Kitt Peak	Spacewatch	VER	2.8 km	MPC · JPL
703495	2007 RB_{341}	—	February 5, 2016	Haleakala	Pan-STARRS 1	·	2.4 km	MPC · JPL
703496	2007 RC_{341}	—	September 14, 2007	Kitt Peak	Spacewatch	·	2.9 km	MPC · JPL
703497	2007 RG_{341}	—	February 11, 2016	Haleakala	Pan-STARRS 1	VER	2.1 km	MPC · JPL
703498	2007 RK_{341}	—	May 3, 2006	Kitt Peak	Spacewatch	THB	2.3 km	MPC · JPL
703499	2007 RO_{341}	—	February 6, 2016	Haleakala	Pan-STARRS 1	·	3.1 km	MPC · JPL
703500	2007 RR_{341}	—	November 8, 2008	Kitt Peak	Spacewatch	·	2.6 km	MPC · JPL

== 703501–703600 ==
back to top

Designation			Discovery			Properties		Ref
Permanent	Provisional	Named after	Date	Site	Discoverer(s)	Category	Diam.	Ref
703501	2007 RB_{342}	—	February 17, 2010	Kitt Peak	Spacewatch	·	760 m	MPC · JPL
703502	2007 RH_{342}	—	April 21, 2009	Mount Lemmon	Mount Lemmon Survey	H	470 m	MPC · JPL
703503	2007 RC_{343}	—	September 10, 2007	Kitt Peak	Spacewatch	·	2.4 km	MPC · JPL
703504	2007 RE_{344}	—	February 16, 2010	Kitt Peak	Spacewatch	·	2.1 km	MPC · JPL
703505	2007 RK_{344}	—	January 28, 2014	Mount Lemmon	Mount Lemmon Survey	·	1.2 km	MPC · JPL
703506	2007 RP_{344}	—	June 27, 2011	Kitt Peak	Spacewatch	MAR	960 m	MPC · JPL
703507	2007 RU_{346}	—	September 10, 2007	Mount Lemmon	Mount Lemmon Survey	·	790 m	MPC · JPL
703508	2007 RA_{347}	—	February 19, 2009	Kitt Peak	Spacewatch	·	580 m	MPC · JPL
703509	2007 RW_{347}	—	October 22, 2012	Haleakala	Pan-STARRS 1	(29841)	1.2 km	MPC · JPL
703510	2007 RB_{348}	—	September 10, 2007	Mount Lemmon	Mount Lemmon Survey	·	1.2 km	MPC · JPL
703511	2007 RZ_{348}	—	December 1, 2008	Mount Lemmon	Mount Lemmon Survey	DOR	2.0 km	MPC · JPL
703512	2007 RG_{349}	—	October 21, 2016	Mount Lemmon	Mount Lemmon Survey	(7744)	1.1 km	MPC · JPL
703513	2007 RY_{349}	—	February 18, 2016	Mount Lemmon	Mount Lemmon Survey	·	2.5 km	MPC · JPL
703514	2007 RS_{350}	—	September 15, 2007	Lulin	LUSS	·	2.1 km	MPC · JPL
703515	2007 RU_{350}	—	March 12, 2010	Catalina	CSS	·	2.6 km	MPC · JPL
703516	2007 RY_{350}	—	January 20, 2015	Mount Lemmon	Mount Lemmon Survey	EOS	1.6 km	MPC · JPL
703517	2007 RE_{351}	—	November 6, 2008	Mount Lemmon	Mount Lemmon Survey	·	2.2 km	MPC · JPL
703518	2007 RH_{352}	—	November 24, 2012	Kitt Peak	Spacewatch	·	1.2 km	MPC · JPL
703519	2007 RM_{352}	—	April 28, 2017	Haleakala	Pan-STARRS 1	·	2.6 km	MPC · JPL
703520	2007 RR_{354}	—	September 15, 2007	Lulin	LUSS	·	1.2 km	MPC · JPL
703521	2007 RH_{355}	—	September 12, 2007	Mount Lemmon	Mount Lemmon Survey	EOS	1.7 km	MPC · JPL
703522	2007 RU_{355}	—	September 8, 2007	Mount Lemmon	Mount Lemmon Survey	·	1.1 km	MPC · JPL
703523	2007 RG_{356}	—	September 15, 2007	Mount Lemmon	Mount Lemmon Survey	·	1.6 km	MPC · JPL
703524	2007 RS_{356}	—	September 14, 2007	Mount Lemmon	Mount Lemmon Survey	·	1.3 km	MPC · JPL
703525	2007 RV_{356}	—	September 14, 2007	Mount Lemmon	Mount Lemmon Survey	(5)	940 m	MPC · JPL
703526	2007 RS_{357}	—	September 15, 2007	Mount Lemmon	Mount Lemmon Survey	EUN	970 m	MPC · JPL
703527	2007 RW_{357}	—	September 10, 2007	Kitt Peak	Spacewatch	·	1.2 km	MPC · JPL
703528	2007 RL_{358}	—	September 13, 2007	Mount Lemmon	Mount Lemmon Survey	WIT	650 m	MPC · JPL
703529	2007 RU_{358}	—	September 9, 2007	Mount Lemmon	Mount Lemmon Survey	EUN	1.1 km	MPC · JPL
703530	2007 RZ_{358}	—	September 13, 2007	Mount Lemmon	Mount Lemmon Survey	·	1.2 km	MPC · JPL
703531	2007 RF_{361}	—	September 13, 2007	Mount Lemmon	Mount Lemmon Survey	·	1.6 km	MPC · JPL
703532	2007 RQ_{361}	—	September 11, 2007	Kitt Peak	Spacewatch	·	1.3 km	MPC · JPL
703533	2007 RM_{364}	—	September 10, 2007	Mount Lemmon	Mount Lemmon Survey	·	1.3 km	MPC · JPL
703534	2007 RQ_{364}	—	September 10, 2007	Mount Lemmon	Mount Lemmon Survey	·	1.6 km	MPC · JPL
703535	2007 RS_{365}	—	September 11, 2007	Mount Lemmon	Mount Lemmon Survey	DOR	1.9 km	MPC · JPL
703536	2007 RM_{367}	—	September 14, 2007	Catalina	CSS	·	1.3 km	MPC · JPL
703537	2007 RC_{368}	—	September 15, 2007	Kitt Peak	Spacewatch	·	2.3 km	MPC · JPL
703538	2007 RK_{369}	—	September 10, 2007	Mount Lemmon	Mount Lemmon Survey	·	2.4 km	MPC · JPL
703539	2007 RY_{369}	—	September 4, 2007	Mount Lemmon	Mount Lemmon Survey	·	2.3 km	MPC · JPL
703540	2007 RQ_{371}	—	September 15, 2007	Kitt Peak	Spacewatch	·	890 m	MPC · JPL
703541	2007 RK_{373}	—	September 13, 2007	Mount Lemmon	Mount Lemmon Survey	HOF	1.9 km	MPC · JPL
703542	2007 RR_{374}	—	September 15, 2007	Kitt Peak	Spacewatch	·	2.2 km	MPC · JPL
703543	2007 RG_{376}	—	September 14, 2007	Mount Lemmon	Mount Lemmon Survey	·	2.2 km	MPC · JPL
703544	2007 RS_{376}	—	September 14, 2007	Mount Lemmon	Mount Lemmon Survey	AGN	900 m	MPC · JPL
703545	2007 SR_{12}	—	September 19, 2007	Kitt Peak	Spacewatch	·	1.4 km	MPC · JPL
703546	2007 SV_{17}	—	August 23, 2007	Kitt Peak	Spacewatch	·	2.4 km	MPC · JPL
703547	2007 SG_{25}	—	September 24, 2007	Kitt Peak	Spacewatch	·	1.4 km	MPC · JPL
703548	2007 SM_{25}	—	September 24, 2007	Kitt Peak	Spacewatch	·	1.4 km	MPC · JPL
703549	2007 SO_{25}	—	September 19, 2007	Kitt Peak	Spacewatch	TIR	2.6 km	MPC · JPL
703550	2007 SE_{26}	—	September 19, 2007	Kitt Peak	Spacewatch	URS	2.5 km	MPC · JPL
703551	2007 SQ_{27}	—	October 5, 2013	Haleakala	Pan-STARRS 1	·	2.4 km	MPC · JPL
703552	2007 SG_{28}	—	September 19, 2007	Kitt Peak	Spacewatch	·	1.1 km	MPC · JPL
703553	2007 SL_{30}	—	September 19, 2007	Kitt Peak	Spacewatch	·	1.3 km	MPC · JPL
703554	2007 TW_{10}	—	October 7, 2007	Mount Lemmon	Mount Lemmon Survey	·	550 m	MPC · JPL
703555	2007 TD_{16}	—	October 6, 2007	Eskridge	G. Hug	·	1.4 km	MPC · JPL
703556	2007 TR_{20}	—	September 13, 2007	Mount Lemmon	Mount Lemmon Survey	·	1.4 km	MPC · JPL
703557	2007 TA_{21}	—	October 9, 2007	Dauban	F. Kugel, C. Rinner	HNS	1.2 km	MPC · JPL
703558	2007 TT_{27}	—	October 4, 2007	Kitt Peak	Spacewatch	VER	2.1 km	MPC · JPL
703559	2007 TL_{28}	—	October 4, 2007	Kitt Peak	Spacewatch	·	1.7 km	MPC · JPL
703560	2007 TE_{29}	—	October 4, 2007	Kitt Peak	Spacewatch	·	1.4 km	MPC · JPL
703561	2007 TX_{35}	—	October 7, 2007	Mount Lemmon	Mount Lemmon Survey	·	3.1 km	MPC · JPL
703562	2007 TO_{44}	—	October 7, 2007	Mount Lemmon	Mount Lemmon Survey	·	1.3 km	MPC · JPL
703563	2007 TP_{50}	—	October 4, 2007	Kitt Peak	Spacewatch	·	1.4 km	MPC · JPL
703564	2007 TO_{51}	—	October 4, 2007	Kitt Peak	Spacewatch	·	1.5 km	MPC · JPL
703565	2007 TB_{59}	—	September 15, 2007	Goodricke-Pigott	R. A. Tucker	·	2.6 km	MPC · JPL
703566	2007 TA_{70}	—	October 8, 2007	Anderson Mesa	LONEOS	·	1.3 km	MPC · JPL
703567	2007 TY_{71}	—	October 12, 2007	Mount Lemmon	Mount Lemmon Survey	·	2.7 km	MPC · JPL
703568	2007 TW_{76}	—	October 5, 2007	Kitt Peak	Spacewatch	·	1.6 km	MPC · JPL
703569	2007 TE_{78}	—	September 15, 2007	Mount Lemmon	Mount Lemmon Survey	·	630 m	MPC · JPL
703570	2007 TK_{78}	—	October 5, 2007	Kitt Peak	Spacewatch	·	1.2 km	MPC · JPL
703571	2007 TY_{84}	—	October 8, 2007	Catalina	CSS	·	2.0 km	MPC · JPL
703572	2007 TB_{85}	—	October 8, 2007	Mount Lemmon	Mount Lemmon Survey	·	1.6 km	MPC · JPL
703573	2007 TW_{87}	—	October 8, 2007	Mount Lemmon	Mount Lemmon Survey	·	560 m	MPC · JPL
703574	2007 TE_{88}	—	October 8, 2007	Mount Lemmon	Mount Lemmon Survey	·	1.6 km	MPC · JPL
703575	2007 TG_{89}	—	October 8, 2007	Mount Lemmon	Mount Lemmon Survey	WIT	840 m	MPC · JPL
703576	2007 TT_{95}	—	October 7, 2007	Kitt Peak	Spacewatch	·	2.2 km	MPC · JPL
703577	2007 TL_{97}	—	October 8, 2007	Mount Lemmon	Mount Lemmon Survey	·	1.4 km	MPC · JPL
703578	2007 TN_{97}	—	October 9, 2007	Mount Lemmon	Mount Lemmon Survey	·	1.4 km	MPC · JPL
703579	2007 TW_{101}	—	October 8, 2007	Mount Lemmon	Mount Lemmon Survey	·	1.1 km	MPC · JPL
703580	2007 TU_{102}	—	September 15, 2007	Mount Lemmon	Mount Lemmon Survey	·	1.4 km	MPC · JPL
703581	2007 TH_{105}	—	October 14, 2007	Front Royal	Skillman, D. R.	·	3.3 km	MPC · JPL
703582	2007 TP_{115}	—	October 8, 2007	Mount Lemmon	Mount Lemmon Survey	·	1.2 km	MPC · JPL
703583	2007 TW_{123}	—	October 6, 2007	Kitt Peak	Spacewatch	·	2.5 km	MPC · JPL
703584	2007 TL_{128}	—	October 6, 2007	Kitt Peak	Spacewatch	·	1.2 km	MPC · JPL
703585	2007 TU_{133}	—	October 7, 2007	Mount Lemmon	Mount Lemmon Survey	·	1.5 km	MPC · JPL
703586	2007 TH_{134}	—	October 7, 2007	Mount Lemmon	Mount Lemmon Survey	VER	2.3 km	MPC · JPL
703587	2007 TX_{135}	—	October 8, 2007	Catalina	CSS	ADE	1.7 km	MPC · JPL
703588	2007 TC_{142}	—	March 10, 2005	Mount Lemmon	Mount Lemmon Survey	MAS	600 m	MPC · JPL
703589	2007 TY_{149}	—	September 2, 2007	Mount Lemmon	Mount Lemmon Survey	·	1.2 km	MPC · JPL
703590	2007 TY_{157}	—	October 11, 2007	Catalina	CSS	·	1.1 km	MPC · JPL
703591	2007 TH_{158}	—	September 15, 1998	Anderson Mesa	LONEOS	·	1.5 km	MPC · JPL
703592	2007 TD_{165}	—	September 25, 2007	Mount Lemmon	Mount Lemmon Survey	·	1.6 km	MPC · JPL
703593	2007 TP_{165}	—	October 8, 2007	Catalina	CSS	·	650 m	MPC · JPL
703594	2007 TK_{168}	—	October 8, 2007	Catalina	CSS	·	600 m	MPC · JPL
703595	2007 TY_{168}	—	September 9, 2007	Pla D'Arguines	R. Ferrando, Ferrando, M.	·	690 m	MPC · JPL
703596	2007 TM_{171}	—	October 24, 2003	Apache Point	SDSS Collaboration	·	1.7 km	MPC · JPL
703597	2007 TT_{189}	—	February 1, 2006	Kitt Peak	Spacewatch	·	540 m	MPC · JPL
703598	2007 TB_{191}	—	August 24, 2007	Kitt Peak	Spacewatch	·	580 m	MPC · JPL
703599	2007 TL_{191}	—	October 4, 2007	Mount Lemmon	Mount Lemmon Survey	·	530 m	MPC · JPL
703600	2007 TH_{194}	—	September 12, 2007	Mount Lemmon	Mount Lemmon Survey	·	890 m	MPC · JPL

== 703601–703700 ==
back to top

Designation			Discovery			Properties		Ref
Permanent	Provisional	Named after	Date	Site	Discoverer(s)	Category	Diam.	Ref
703601	2007 TZ_{194}	—	October 7, 2007	Mount Lemmon	Mount Lemmon Survey	MAS	640 m	MPC · JPL
703602	2007 TR_{196}	—	October 7, 2007	Mount Lemmon	Mount Lemmon Survey	·	1.5 km	MPC · JPL
703603	2007 TT_{196}	—	October 18, 2003	Kitt Peak	Spacewatch	·	1.3 km	MPC · JPL
703604	2007 TM_{199}	—	October 8, 2007	Kitt Peak	Spacewatch	·	1.2 km	MPC · JPL
703605	2007 TQ_{202}	—	October 8, 2007	Mount Lemmon	Mount Lemmon Survey	·	1.2 km	MPC · JPL
703606	2007 TR_{203}	—	October 8, 2007	Mount Lemmon	Mount Lemmon Survey	·	1.4 km	MPC · JPL
703607	2007 TA_{204}	—	October 8, 2007	Mount Lemmon	Mount Lemmon Survey	·	1.1 km	MPC · JPL
703608	2007 TJ_{206}	—	October 10, 2007	Mount Lemmon	Mount Lemmon Survey	·	3.1 km	MPC · JPL
703609	2007 TR_{207}	—	September 11, 2007	Kitt Peak	Spacewatch	·	2.4 km	MPC · JPL
703610	2007 TF_{211}	—	October 7, 2007	Kitt Peak	Spacewatch	EOS	1.6 km	MPC · JPL
703611	2007 TP_{215}	—	October 7, 2007	Kitt Peak	Spacewatch	·	1.5 km	MPC · JPL
703612	2007 TJ_{219}	—	October 8, 2007	Mount Lemmon	Mount Lemmon Survey	·	700 m	MPC · JPL
703613	2007 TC_{222}	—	October 9, 2007	Kitt Peak	Spacewatch	·	1.2 km	MPC · JPL
703614	2007 TL_{222}	—	October 9, 2007	Kitt Peak	Spacewatch	·	620 m	MPC · JPL
703615	2007 TP_{223}	—	April 24, 2003	Kitt Peak	Spacewatch	·	570 m	MPC · JPL
703616	2007 TJ_{233}	—	October 8, 2007	Kitt Peak	Spacewatch	·	1.3 km	MPC · JPL
703617	2007 TF_{234}	—	September 14, 2007	Mount Lemmon	Mount Lemmon Survey	·	1.3 km	MPC · JPL
703618	2007 TG_{235}	—	October 9, 2007	Kitt Peak	Spacewatch	·	1.2 km	MPC · JPL
703619	2007 TZ_{237}	—	August 24, 2007	Kitt Peak	Spacewatch	·	2.4 km	MPC · JPL
703620	2007 TU_{238}	—	October 10, 2007	Mount Lemmon	Mount Lemmon Survey	·	710 m	MPC · JPL
703621	2007 TG_{248}	—	September 11, 2007	Mount Lemmon	Mount Lemmon Survey	·	1.1 km	MPC · JPL
703622	2007 TR_{250}	—	October 11, 2007	Mount Lemmon	Mount Lemmon Survey	·	1.2 km	MPC · JPL
703623	2007 TO_{251}	—	November 23, 2012	Kitt Peak	Spacewatch	WIT	840 m	MPC · JPL
703624	2007 TV_{253}	—	October 8, 2007	Mount Lemmon	Mount Lemmon Survey	·	1.2 km	MPC · JPL
703625	2007 TR_{256}	—	October 10, 2007	Kitt Peak	Spacewatch	·	1.2 km	MPC · JPL
703626	2007 TK_{259}	—	September 14, 2007	Mount Lemmon	Mount Lemmon Survey	·	2.9 km	MPC · JPL
703627	2007 TF_{260}	—	October 10, 2007	Mount Lemmon	Mount Lemmon Survey	WIT	720 m	MPC · JPL
703628	2007 TB_{264}	—	October 11, 2007	Kitt Peak	Spacewatch	·	1.5 km	MPC · JPL
703629	2007 TH_{264}	—	October 11, 2007	Kitt Peak	Spacewatch	·	1.7 km	MPC · JPL
703630	2007 TR_{264}	—	October 11, 2007	Kitt Peak	Spacewatch	·	970 m	MPC · JPL
703631	2007 TP_{265}	—	October 11, 2007	Kitt Peak	Spacewatch	·	1.2 km	MPC · JPL
703632	2007 TV_{269}	—	October 9, 2007	Kitt Peak	Spacewatch	·	1.6 km	MPC · JPL
703633	2007 TJ_{272}	—	October 9, 2007	Kitt Peak	Spacewatch	·	1.6 km	MPC · JPL
703634	2007 TL_{276}	—	September 14, 2007	Mount Lemmon	Mount Lemmon Survey	·	1.5 km	MPC · JPL
703635	2007 TJ_{279}	—	November 21, 2003	Palomar	NEAT	·	2.0 km	MPC · JPL
703636	2007 TV_{279}	—	October 12, 2007	Mount Lemmon	Mount Lemmon Survey	·	1.3 km	MPC · JPL
703637	2007 TD_{281}	—	September 10, 2007	Mount Lemmon	Mount Lemmon Survey	·	610 m	MPC · JPL
703638	2007 TE_{282}	—	October 8, 2007	Mount Lemmon	Mount Lemmon Survey	·	1.3 km	MPC · JPL
703639	2007 TS_{285}	—	September 11, 2007	Kitt Peak	Spacewatch	·	1.6 km	MPC · JPL
703640	2007 TH_{290}	—	October 12, 2007	Mount Lemmon	Mount Lemmon Survey	·	1.4 km	MPC · JPL
703641	2007 TZ_{290}	—	October 12, 2007	Mount Lemmon	Mount Lemmon Survey	·	1.1 km	MPC · JPL
703642	2007 TO_{295}	—	March 25, 2006	Mount Lemmon	Mount Lemmon Survey	MAS	690 m	MPC · JPL
703643	2007 TY_{296}	—	October 10, 2007	Mount Lemmon	Mount Lemmon Survey	·	1.0 km	MPC · JPL
703644	2007 TE_{299}	—	September 8, 2007	Mount Lemmon	Mount Lemmon Survey	·	1.7 km	MPC · JPL
703645	2007 TV_{301}	—	October 12, 2007	Kitt Peak	Spacewatch	·	640 m	MPC · JPL
703646	2007 TJ_{307}	—	October 9, 2007	Kitt Peak	Spacewatch	·	1.5 km	MPC · JPL
703647	2007 TJ_{310}	—	September 14, 2007	Mount Lemmon	Mount Lemmon Survey	(2076)	650 m	MPC · JPL
703648	2007 TA_{324}	—	October 11, 2007	Kitt Peak	Spacewatch	·	620 m	MPC · JPL
703649	2007 TW_{325}	—	October 11, 2007	Kitt Peak	Spacewatch	·	1.6 km	MPC · JPL
703650	2007 TL_{327}	—	October 11, 2007	Kitt Peak	Spacewatch	PAD	1.2 km	MPC · JPL
703651	2007 TW_{327}	—	October 11, 2007	Kitt Peak	Spacewatch	·	1.6 km	MPC · JPL
703652	2007 TX_{333}	—	October 11, 2007	Kitt Peak	Spacewatch	·	1.8 km	MPC · JPL
703653	2007 TN_{338}	—	August 10, 2007	Kitt Peak	Spacewatch	·	2.6 km	MPC · JPL
703654	2007 TW_{340}	—	August 26, 2003	Cerro Tololo	Deep Ecliptic Survey	MAS	550 m	MPC · JPL
703655	2007 TC_{341}	—	October 9, 2007	Mount Lemmon	Mount Lemmon Survey	KOR	1.0 km	MPC · JPL
703656	2007 TD_{342}	—	October 9, 2007	Mount Lemmon	Mount Lemmon Survey	HNS	960 m	MPC · JPL
703657	2007 TL_{344}	—	October 10, 2007	Mount Lemmon	Mount Lemmon Survey	WIT	830 m	MPC · JPL
703658	2007 TP_{345}	—	September 13, 2007	Mount Lemmon	Mount Lemmon Survey	·	1.3 km	MPC · JPL
703659	2007 TQ_{346}	—	October 13, 2007	Mount Lemmon	Mount Lemmon Survey	WIT	920 m	MPC · JPL
703660	2007 TR_{346}	—	October 13, 2007	Mount Lemmon	Mount Lemmon Survey	·	1.2 km	MPC · JPL
703661	2007 TX_{346}	—	October 13, 2007	Mount Lemmon	Mount Lemmon Survey	V	500 m	MPC · JPL
703662	2007 TT_{352}	—	September 12, 2007	Mount Lemmon	Mount Lemmon Survey	·	590 m	MPC · JPL
703663	2007 TY_{352}	—	May 20, 2006	Mount Lemmon	Mount Lemmon Survey	THB	3.0 km	MPC · JPL
703664	2007 TN_{358}	—	April 10, 2005	Mount Lemmon	Mount Lemmon Survey	·	2.6 km	MPC · JPL
703665	2007 TJ_{363}	—	October 15, 2007	Mount Lemmon	Mount Lemmon Survey	·	1.8 km	MPC · JPL
703666	2007 TB_{364}	—	October 15, 2007	Mount Lemmon	Mount Lemmon Survey	·	2.2 km	MPC · JPL
703667	2007 TE_{365}	—	September 11, 2007	Mount Lemmon	Mount Lemmon Survey	·	2.2 km	MPC · JPL
703668	2007 TC_{368}	—	October 10, 2007	Mount Lemmon	Mount Lemmon Survey	·	510 m	MPC · JPL
703669	2007 TY_{376}	—	October 11, 2007	Catalina	CSS	·	1.2 km	MPC · JPL
703670	2007 TZ_{389}	—	October 8, 2007	Mount Lemmon	Mount Lemmon Survey	KOR	990 m	MPC · JPL
703671	2007 TK_{392}	—	October 8, 2007	Mount Lemmon	Mount Lemmon Survey	·	1.2 km	MPC · JPL
703672	2007 TS_{397}	—	October 15, 2007	Kitt Peak	Spacewatch	·	1.5 km	MPC · JPL
703673	2007 TG_{399}	—	September 9, 2007	Mount Lemmon	Mount Lemmon Survey	·	1.3 km	MPC · JPL
703674	2007 TX_{400}	—	October 14, 2007	Mount Lemmon	Mount Lemmon Survey	·	1.2 km	MPC · JPL
703675	2007 TR_{401}	—	October 15, 2007	Mount Lemmon	Mount Lemmon Survey	·	1.5 km	MPC · JPL
703676	2007 TA_{404}	—	October 15, 2007	Kitt Peak	Spacewatch	·	1.6 km	MPC · JPL
703677	2007 TX_{413}	—	October 15, 2007	Catalina	CSS	ADE	1.7 km	MPC · JPL
703678	2007 TO_{420}	—	December 22, 2003	Kitt Peak	Spacewatch	·	1.3 km	MPC · JPL
703679	2007 TW_{421}	—	October 15, 2007	Catalina	CSS	·	1.6 km	MPC · JPL
703680	2007 TX_{429}	—	October 13, 2007	Mount Lemmon	Mount Lemmon Survey	·	590 m	MPC · JPL
703681	2007 TL_{430}	—	October 12, 2007	Mount Lemmon	Mount Lemmon Survey	·	1.3 km	MPC · JPL
703682	2007 TT_{450}	—	October 12, 2007	Mount Lemmon	Mount Lemmon Survey	·	2.6 km	MPC · JPL
703683	2007 TM_{452}	—	October 9, 2007	Anderson Mesa	LONEOS	·	670 m	MPC · JPL
703684	2007 TD_{455}	—	October 9, 2007	Mount Lemmon	Mount Lemmon Survey	VER	2.5 km	MPC · JPL
703685	2007 TN_{457}	—	October 9, 2007	Mount Lemmon	Mount Lemmon Survey	·	1.2 km	MPC · JPL
703686	2007 TU_{457}	—	October 10, 2007	Mount Lemmon	Mount Lemmon Survey	·	2.7 km	MPC · JPL
703687	2007 TF_{458}	—	October 10, 2007	Mount Lemmon	Mount Lemmon Survey	·	1.5 km	MPC · JPL
703688	2007 TW_{459}	—	October 9, 2007	Kitt Peak	Spacewatch	·	1.8 km	MPC · JPL
703689	2007 TY_{459}	—	October 12, 2007	Kitt Peak	Spacewatch	WIT	910 m	MPC · JPL
703690	2007 TK_{460}	—	September 15, 2007	Kitt Peak	Spacewatch	·	780 m	MPC · JPL
703691	2007 TL_{460}	—	September 17, 2014	Haleakala	Pan-STARRS 1	·	800 m	MPC · JPL
703692	2007 TS_{460}	—	October 10, 2007	Kitt Peak	Spacewatch	·	1.6 km	MPC · JPL
703693	2007 TF_{461}	—	September 12, 2007	Kitt Peak	Spacewatch	WIT	880 m	MPC · JPL
703694	2007 TQ_{461}	—	October 10, 2007	Kitt Peak	Spacewatch	·	1.4 km	MPC · JPL
703695	2007 TB_{462}	—	June 23, 2010	Mount Lemmon	Mount Lemmon Survey	·	720 m	MPC · JPL
703696	2007 TV_{462}	—	October 13, 2016	Haleakala	Pan-STARRS 1	·	1.6 km	MPC · JPL
703697	2007 TP_{463}	—	February 26, 2014	Haleakala	Pan-STARRS 1	·	1.4 km	MPC · JPL
703698	2007 TN_{464}	—	October 12, 2007	Kitt Peak	Spacewatch	·	1.3 km	MPC · JPL
703699	2007 TW_{465}	—	January 17, 2013	Kitt Peak	Spacewatch	MAR	930 m	MPC · JPL
703700	2007 TZ_{465}	—	October 14, 2007	Catalina	CSS	LIX	3.0 km	MPC · JPL

== 703701–703800 ==
back to top

Designation			Discovery			Properties		Ref
Permanent	Provisional	Named after	Date	Site	Discoverer(s)	Category	Diam.	Ref
703701	2007 TG_{466}	—	December 1, 2008	Mount Lemmon	Mount Lemmon Survey	·	3.0 km	MPC · JPL
703702	2007 TK_{466}	—	October 5, 1996	Kitt Peak	Spacewatch	HYG	2.6 km	MPC · JPL
703703	2007 TQ_{466}	—	October 15, 2007	Mount Lemmon	Mount Lemmon Survey	·	2.8 km	MPC · JPL
703704	2007 TR_{466}	—	October 12, 2007	Mount Lemmon	Mount Lemmon Survey	·	1.6 km	MPC · JPL
703705	2007 TO_{467}	—	June 10, 2018	Haleakala	Pan-STARRS 1	·	2.5 km	MPC · JPL
703706	2007 TY_{467}	—	July 28, 2011	Haleakala	Pan-STARRS 1	·	1.5 km	MPC · JPL
703707	2007 TQ_{468}	—	October 12, 2007	Kitt Peak	Spacewatch	·	1.5 km	MPC · JPL
703708	2007 TZ_{468}	—	October 21, 2016	Mount Lemmon	Mount Lemmon Survey	·	1.3 km	MPC · JPL
703709	2007 TK_{469}	—	August 24, 2007	Kitt Peak	Spacewatch	·	1.9 km	MPC · JPL
703710	2007 TX_{470}	—	July 27, 2011	Haleakala	Pan-STARRS 1	·	1.2 km	MPC · JPL
703711	2007 TD_{471}	—	October 15, 2007	Mount Lemmon	Mount Lemmon Survey	EOS	1.5 km	MPC · JPL
703712	2007 TN_{471}	—	June 14, 2015	Mount Lemmon	Mount Lemmon Survey	·	1.6 km	MPC · JPL
703713	2007 TH_{472}	—	October 15, 2012	Kitt Peak	Spacewatch	·	1.7 km	MPC · JPL
703714	2007 TH_{474}	—	October 10, 2007	Mount Lemmon	Mount Lemmon Survey	·	1.6 km	MPC · JPL
703715	2007 TK_{474}	—	June 18, 2015	Haleakala	Pan-STARRS 1	·	1.3 km	MPC · JPL
703716	2007 TP_{474}	—	September 30, 2016	Haleakala	Pan-STARRS 1	HOF	2.0 km	MPC · JPL
703717	2007 TS_{474}	—	February 26, 2014	Haleakala	Pan-STARRS 1	·	1.7 km	MPC · JPL
703718	2007 TU_{474}	—	September 2, 2011	Haleakala	Pan-STARRS 1	·	1.4 km	MPC · JPL
703719	2007 TY_{474}	—	March 3, 2009	Kitt Peak	Spacewatch	·	910 m	MPC · JPL
703720	2007 TF_{475}	—	October 12, 2007	Catalina	CSS	·	1.4 km	MPC · JPL
703721	2007 TG_{475}	—	September 27, 2016	Haleakala	Pan-STARRS 1	·	1.3 km	MPC · JPL
703722	2007 TM_{475}	—	October 8, 2007	Mount Lemmon	Mount Lemmon Survey	KOR	970 m	MPC · JPL
703723	2007 TX_{475}	—	October 10, 2007	Catalina	CSS	·	1.2 km	MPC · JPL
703724	2007 TE_{476}	—	September 30, 2016	Haleakala	Pan-STARRS 1	·	1.3 km	MPC · JPL
703725	2007 TN_{476}	—	January 29, 2009	Mount Lemmon	Mount Lemmon Survey	·	1.6 km	MPC · JPL
703726	2007 TT_{476}	—	October 18, 2014	Mount Lemmon	Mount Lemmon Survey	·	840 m	MPC · JPL
703727	2007 TS_{477}	—	October 15, 2007	Mount Lemmon	Mount Lemmon Survey	·	1.6 km	MPC · JPL
703728	2007 TF_{479}	—	November 5, 2016	Mount Lemmon	Mount Lemmon Survey	EUN	1.2 km	MPC · JPL
703729	2007 TR_{479}	—	October 12, 2007	Mount Lemmon	Mount Lemmon Survey	·	830 m	MPC · JPL
703730	2007 TW_{480}	—	October 14, 2007	Kitt Peak	Spacewatch	·	1.8 km	MPC · JPL
703731	2007 TD_{483}	—	October 13, 2007	Mount Lemmon	Mount Lemmon Survey	KOR	990 m	MPC · JPL
703732	2007 TO_{483}	—	October 14, 2007	Mount Lemmon	Mount Lemmon Survey	·	1.5 km	MPC · JPL
703733	2007 TD_{485}	—	October 9, 2007	Kitt Peak	Spacewatch	·	1.5 km	MPC · JPL
703734	2007 TP_{485}	—	October 12, 2007	Kitt Peak	Spacewatch	·	1.1 km	MPC · JPL
703735	2007 TD_{486}	—	October 8, 2007	Mount Lemmon	Mount Lemmon Survey	·	520 m	MPC · JPL
703736	2007 TO_{488}	—	October 4, 2007	Kitt Peak	Spacewatch	HNS	790 m	MPC · JPL
703737	2007 TC_{489}	—	October 12, 2007	Mount Lemmon	Mount Lemmon Survey	·	1.5 km	MPC · JPL
703738	2007 TR_{489}	—	October 11, 2007	Mount Lemmon	Mount Lemmon Survey	·	1.3 km	MPC · JPL
703739	2007 TL_{490}	—	October 9, 2007	Mount Lemmon	Mount Lemmon Survey	·	1.3 km	MPC · JPL
703740	2007 TU_{490}	—	October 11, 2007	Kitt Peak	Spacewatch	·	1.4 km	MPC · JPL
703741	2007 TG_{491}	—	October 12, 2007	Kitt Peak	Spacewatch	·	1.2 km	MPC · JPL
703742	2007 TM_{491}	—	October 8, 2007	Catalina	CSS	·	1.0 km	MPC · JPL
703743	2007 TU_{493}	—	October 13, 2007	Mount Lemmon	Mount Lemmon Survey	·	2.6 km	MPC · JPL
703744	2007 TO_{495}	—	October 9, 2007	Mount Lemmon	Mount Lemmon Survey	·	1.2 km	MPC · JPL
703745	2007 TX_{503}	—	October 7, 2007	Mount Lemmon	Mount Lemmon Survey	·	1.1 km	MPC · JPL
703746	2007 TZ_{503}	—	October 15, 2007	Mount Lemmon	Mount Lemmon Survey	·	1.2 km	MPC · JPL
703747	2007 TT_{505}	—	October 10, 2007	Kitt Peak	Spacewatch	·	2.8 km	MPC · JPL
703748	2007 TB_{507}	—	October 12, 2007	Mount Lemmon	Mount Lemmon Survey	·	730 m	MPC · JPL
703749	2007 US_{4}	—	October 4, 2007	Kitt Peak	Spacewatch	·	1.5 km	MPC · JPL
703750	2007 UV_{13}	—	October 11, 2007	Mount Lemmon	Mount Lemmon Survey	AGN	850 m	MPC · JPL
703751	2007 UQ_{26}	—	October 16, 2007	Mount Lemmon	Mount Lemmon Survey	·	2.8 km	MPC · JPL
703752	2007 UA_{28}	—	September 19, 2007	Kitt Peak	Spacewatch	·	2.8 km	MPC · JPL
703753	2007 UB_{30}	—	October 10, 2007	Catalina	CSS	·	1.8 km	MPC · JPL
703754	2007 UL_{31}	—	October 19, 2007	Catalina	CSS	·	1.3 km	MPC · JPL
703755	2007 UV_{32}	—	October 19, 2007	Kitt Peak	Spacewatch	·	1.9 km	MPC · JPL
703756 Xijiaouni	2007 UL_{35}	Xijiaouni	September 21, 2007	XuYi	PMO NEO Survey Program	·	1.6 km	MPC · JPL
703757	2007 UY_{39}	—	October 20, 2007	Mount Lemmon	Mount Lemmon Survey	·	1.7 km	MPC · JPL
703758	2007 UW_{40}	—	October 16, 2007	Kitt Peak	Spacewatch	·	1.7 km	MPC · JPL
703759	2007 UN_{42}	—	October 16, 2007	Mount Lemmon	Mount Lemmon Survey	·	2.9 km	MPC · JPL
703760	2007 UW_{42}	—	October 9, 2007	Kitt Peak	Spacewatch	PAD	1.4 km	MPC · JPL
703761	2007 UH_{50}	—	October 24, 2007	Mount Lemmon	Mount Lemmon Survey	·	1.3 km	MPC · JPL
703762	2007 UB_{56}	—	October 18, 2007	Kitt Peak	Spacewatch	(18466)	1.8 km	MPC · JPL
703763	2007 UM_{56}	—	October 16, 2007	Kitt Peak	Spacewatch	·	1.7 km	MPC · JPL
703764	2007 UF_{58}	—	October 10, 2007	Kitt Peak	Spacewatch	LIX	3.0 km	MPC · JPL
703765	2007 UW_{61}	—	October 30, 2007	Kitt Peak	Spacewatch	·	740 m	MPC · JPL
703766	2007 UA_{63}	—	September 12, 2007	Mount Lemmon	Mount Lemmon Survey	·	2.8 km	MPC · JPL
703767	2007 UC_{69}	—	October 7, 2007	Mount Lemmon	Mount Lemmon Survey	PAD	1.4 km	MPC · JPL
703768	2007 UJ_{69}	—	October 18, 2007	Kitt Peak	Spacewatch	·	1.4 km	MPC · JPL
703769	2007 UO_{72}	—	October 31, 2007	Mount Lemmon	Mount Lemmon Survey	·	1.5 km	MPC · JPL
703770	2007 UJ_{74}	—	October 31, 2007	Mount Lemmon	Mount Lemmon Survey	·	1.3 km	MPC · JPL
703771	2007 UL_{74}	—	October 31, 2007	Mount Lemmon	Mount Lemmon Survey	ADE	1.8 km	MPC · JPL
703772	2007 UW_{76}	—	October 11, 2007	Kitt Peak	Spacewatch	·	2.5 km	MPC · JPL
703773	2007 UB_{88}	—	October 30, 2007	Kitt Peak	Spacewatch	EUN	860 m	MPC · JPL
703774	2007 UA_{91}	—	October 4, 2007	Kitt Peak	Spacewatch	·	1.2 km	MPC · JPL
703775	2007 UB_{91}	—	October 30, 2007	Mount Lemmon	Mount Lemmon Survey	·	1.5 km	MPC · JPL
703776	2007 UT_{98}	—	October 30, 2007	Kitt Peak	Spacewatch	·	1.8 km	MPC · JPL
703777	2007 UM_{102}	—	October 30, 2007	Mount Lemmon	Mount Lemmon Survey	·	1.4 km	MPC · JPL
703778	2007 UA_{109}	—	October 30, 2007	Kitt Peak	Spacewatch	·	590 m	MPC · JPL
703779	2007 UT_{117}	—	October 8, 2007	Kitt Peak	Spacewatch	·	1.4 km	MPC · JPL
703780	2007 UU_{125}	—	October 30, 2007	Kitt Peak	Spacewatch	·	920 m	MPC · JPL
703781	2007 UG_{127}	—	October 30, 2007	Kitt Peak	Spacewatch	·	980 m	MPC · JPL
703782	2007 UG_{131}	—	October 16, 2007	Mount Lemmon	Mount Lemmon Survey	·	3.1 km	MPC · JPL
703783	2007 UJ_{139}	—	October 21, 2007	Mount Lemmon	Mount Lemmon Survey	·	620 m	MPC · JPL
703784	2007 UF_{140}	—	October 16, 2007	Mount Lemmon	Mount Lemmon Survey	·	1.6 km	MPC · JPL
703785	2007 UA_{143}	—	October 8, 2007	Mount Lemmon	Mount Lemmon Survey	·	2.3 km	MPC · JPL
703786	2007 UL_{143}	—	October 20, 2007	Kitt Peak	Spacewatch	·	1.4 km	MPC · JPL
703787	2007 UM_{143}	—	October 20, 2007	Kitt Peak	Spacewatch	·	2.3 km	MPC · JPL
703788	2007 UC_{144}	—	October 18, 2007	Mount Lemmon	Mount Lemmon Survey	·	1.7 km	MPC · JPL
703789	2007 US_{144}	—	October 20, 2007	Mount Lemmon	Mount Lemmon Survey	·	580 m	MPC · JPL
703790	2007 UG_{145}	—	October 21, 2007	Mount Lemmon	Mount Lemmon Survey	·	1.3 km	MPC · JPL
703791	2007 UG_{146}	—	February 26, 2014	Haleakala	Pan-STARRS 1	WIT	860 m	MPC · JPL
703792	2007 US_{146}	—	October 18, 2007	Kitt Peak	Spacewatch	·	1.4 km	MPC · JPL
703793	2007 UM_{148}	—	September 12, 2015	Haleakala	Pan-STARRS 1	·	910 m	MPC · JPL
703794	2007 US_{148}	—	November 5, 2016	Mount Lemmon	Mount Lemmon Survey	·	1.5 km	MPC · JPL
703795	2007 UB_{149}	—	October 31, 2007	Mount Lemmon	Mount Lemmon Survey	·	2.8 km	MPC · JPL
703796	2007 UE_{149}	—	September 9, 2007	Kitt Peak	Spacewatch	HYG	2.2 km	MPC · JPL
703797	2007 UP_{149}	—	March 12, 2014	Mount Lemmon	Mount Lemmon Survey	·	1.4 km	MPC · JPL
703798	2007 UU_{151}	—	December 30, 2008	Kitt Peak	Spacewatch	·	1.1 km	MPC · JPL
703799	2007 UY_{151}	—	March 5, 2010	Kitt Peak	Spacewatch	·	1.7 km	MPC · JPL
703800	2007 UN_{152}	—	August 23, 2011	Mayhill-ISON	L. Elenin	·	1.5 km	MPC · JPL

== 703801–703900 ==
back to top

Designation			Discovery			Properties		Ref
Permanent	Provisional	Named after	Date	Site	Discoverer(s)	Category	Diam.	Ref
703801	2007 UO_{152}	—	September 25, 2016	Mount Lemmon	Mount Lemmon Survey	·	1.3 km	MPC · JPL
703802	2007 UV_{152}	—	February 26, 2014	Haleakala	Pan-STARRS 1	615	960 m	MPC · JPL
703803	2007 UY_{152}	—	September 30, 2016	Haleakala	Pan-STARRS 1	·	1.3 km	MPC · JPL
703804	2007 UL_{153}	—	December 8, 2012	Mount Lemmon	Mount Lemmon Survey	·	1.5 km	MPC · JPL
703805	2007 UC_{154}	—	September 27, 2016	Haleakala	Pan-STARRS 1	·	1.5 km	MPC · JPL
703806	2007 UE_{154}	—	October 18, 2007	Mount Lemmon	Mount Lemmon Survey	·	1.4 km	MPC · JPL
703807	2007 UL_{154}	—	December 21, 2014	Haleakala	Pan-STARRS 1	·	2.4 km	MPC · JPL
703808	2007 UQ_{154}	—	February 16, 2015	Haleakala	Pan-STARRS 1	EOS	1.4 km	MPC · JPL
703809	2007 UW_{156}	—	October 31, 2007	Mount Lemmon	Mount Lemmon Survey	AGN	910 m	MPC · JPL
703810	2007 UC_{157}	—	October 31, 2007	Mount Lemmon	Mount Lemmon Survey	AGN	970 m	MPC · JPL
703811	2007 UD_{157}	—	October 17, 2007	Mount Lemmon	Mount Lemmon Survey	·	1.8 km	MPC · JPL
703812	2007 UV_{158}	—	October 31, 2007	Mount Lemmon	Mount Lemmon Survey	·	1.4 km	MPC · JPL
703813	2007 UC_{159}	—	October 23, 2007	Kitt Peak	Spacewatch	·	1.5 km	MPC · JPL
703814	2007 UP_{162}	—	October 30, 2007	Kitt Peak	Spacewatch	KOR	1.1 km	MPC · JPL
703815	2007 UQ_{164}	—	October 18, 2007	Mount Lemmon	Mount Lemmon Survey	AGN	900 m	MPC · JPL
703816	2007 VQ_{15}	—	October 12, 2007	Kitt Peak	Spacewatch	·	2.5 km	MPC · JPL
703817	2007 VC_{17}	—	October 8, 2007	Kitt Peak	Spacewatch	SYL	3.4 km	MPC · JPL
703818	2007 VA_{19}	—	October 7, 2007	Mount Lemmon	Mount Lemmon Survey	·	1.3 km	MPC · JPL
703819	2007 VF_{19}	—	November 1, 2007	Mount Lemmon	Mount Lemmon Survey	·	1.2 km	MPC · JPL
703820	2007 VM_{26}	—	November 2, 2007	Mount Lemmon	Mount Lemmon Survey	·	680 m	MPC · JPL
703821	2007 VT_{26}	—	November 2, 2007	Mount Lemmon	Mount Lemmon Survey	·	1 km	MPC · JPL
703822	2007 VL_{28}	—	November 2, 2007	Mount Lemmon	Mount Lemmon Survey	·	1.5 km	MPC · JPL
703823	2007 VJ_{29}	—	August 19, 2001	Cerro Tololo	Deep Ecliptic Survey	KOR	1.0 km	MPC · JPL
703824	2007 VF_{34}	—	October 20, 2007	Bergisch Gladbach	W. Bickel	·	1.5 km	MPC · JPL
703825	2007 VU_{34}	—	May 8, 2006	Mount Lemmon	Mount Lemmon Survey	·	750 m	MPC · JPL
703826	2007 VH_{35}	—	November 1, 2007	Kitt Peak	Spacewatch	·	840 m	MPC · JPL
703827	2007 VK_{37}	—	October 12, 2007	Kitt Peak	Spacewatch	NYS	810 m	MPC · JPL
703828	2007 VK_{38}	—	November 2, 2007	Mount Lemmon	Mount Lemmon Survey	·	2.4 km	MPC · JPL
703829	2007 VM_{50}	—	November 1, 2007	Kitt Peak	Spacewatch	·	1.6 km	MPC · JPL
703830	2007 VB_{54}	—	November 1, 2007	Kitt Peak	Spacewatch	·	1.4 km	MPC · JPL
703831	2007 VK_{61}	—	November 1, 2007	Kitt Peak	Spacewatch	·	1.5 km	MPC · JPL
703832	2007 VW_{67}	—	October 25, 2003	Kitt Peak	Spacewatch	·	1.5 km	MPC · JPL
703833	2007 VN_{68}	—	October 18, 2007	Kitt Peak	Spacewatch	·	1.3 km	MPC · JPL
703834	2007 VE_{69}	—	August 18, 2007	Anderson Mesa	LONEOS	·	3.3 km	MPC · JPL
703835	2007 VJ_{74}	—	November 3, 2007	Kitt Peak	Spacewatch	·	1.0 km	MPC · JPL
703836	2007 VL_{77}	—	October 10, 2007	Mount Lemmon	Mount Lemmon Survey	·	1.4 km	MPC · JPL
703837	2007 VM_{79}	—	September 14, 2007	Mount Lemmon	Mount Lemmon Survey	·	1.3 km	MPC · JPL
703838	2007 VE_{83}	—	November 4, 2007	Mount Lemmon	Mount Lemmon Survey	·	1.3 km	MPC · JPL
703839	2007 VF_{85}	—	October 17, 2007	Mount Lemmon	Mount Lemmon Survey	·	1.5 km	MPC · JPL
703840	2007 VO_{87}	—	November 2, 2007	Socorro	LINEAR	·	2.0 km	MPC · JPL
703841	2007 VW_{92}	—	November 3, 2007	Socorro	LINEAR	EUN	1.1 km	MPC · JPL
703842	2007 VY_{98}	—	September 14, 2007	Mount Lemmon	Mount Lemmon Survey	·	2.3 km	MPC · JPL
703843	2007 VE_{102}	—	November 2, 2007	Kitt Peak	Spacewatch	PHO	860 m	MPC · JPL
703844	2007 VL_{104}	—	November 3, 2007	Kitt Peak	Spacewatch	·	1.3 km	MPC · JPL
703845	2007 VR_{104}	—	October 14, 2007	Mount Lemmon	Mount Lemmon Survey	PHO	910 m	MPC · JPL
703846	2007 VE_{112}	—	November 3, 2007	Kitt Peak	Spacewatch	·	1.6 km	MPC · JPL
703847	2007 VF_{112}	—	November 3, 2007	Kitt Peak	Spacewatch	·	1.3 km	MPC · JPL
703848	2007 VH_{113}	—	November 3, 2007	Kitt Peak	Spacewatch	·	1.4 km	MPC · JPL
703849	2007 VR_{113}	—	October 19, 1998	Kitt Peak	Spacewatch	·	1.3 km	MPC · JPL
703850	2007 VN_{120}	—	October 9, 2007	Kitt Peak	Spacewatch	·	1.7 km	MPC · JPL
703851	2007 VJ_{121}	—	November 5, 2007	Kitt Peak	Spacewatch	PAD	1.4 km	MPC · JPL
703852	2007 VJ_{123}	—	October 18, 2007	Mount Lemmon	Mount Lemmon Survey	·	1.0 km	MPC · JPL
703853	2007 VS_{124}	—	November 5, 2007	Mount Lemmon	Mount Lemmon Survey	·	1.4 km	MPC · JPL
703854	2007 VD_{129}	—	November 1, 2007	Mount Lemmon	Mount Lemmon Survey	·	2.2 km	MPC · JPL
703855	2007 VK_{129}	—	November 1, 2007	Mount Lemmon	Mount Lemmon Survey	·	2.4 km	MPC · JPL
703856	2007 VM_{129}	—	October 18, 2007	Kitt Peak	Spacewatch	·	1.6 km	MPC · JPL
703857	2007 VZ_{133}	—	November 3, 2007	Kitt Peak	Spacewatch	·	1.2 km	MPC · JPL
703858	2007 VG_{137}	—	November 5, 2007	Mount Lemmon	Mount Lemmon Survey	·	1.8 km	MPC · JPL
703859	2007 VK_{139}	—	October 12, 2007	Kitt Peak	Spacewatch	·	1.6 km	MPC · JPL
703860	2007 VF_{143}	—	November 4, 2007	Kitt Peak	Spacewatch	·	1.3 km	MPC · JPL
703861	2007 VS_{146}	—	November 4, 2007	Mount Lemmon	Mount Lemmon Survey	·	1.7 km	MPC · JPL
703862	2007 VW_{150}	—	October 20, 2007	Mount Lemmon	Mount Lemmon Survey	KOR	1.1 km	MPC · JPL
703863	2007 VA_{151}	—	November 7, 2007	Kitt Peak	Spacewatch	THM	2.2 km	MPC · JPL
703864	2007 VT_{152}	—	November 2, 2007	Kitt Peak	Spacewatch	·	1.7 km	MPC · JPL
703865	2007 VY_{152}	—	November 2, 2007	Catalina	CSS	·	930 m	MPC · JPL
703866	2007 VH_{154}	—	November 5, 2007	Kitt Peak	Spacewatch	·	1.1 km	MPC · JPL
703867	2007 VM_{154}	—	November 5, 2007	Kitt Peak	Spacewatch	·	1.4 km	MPC · JPL
703868	2007 VK_{155}	—	November 5, 2007	Kitt Peak	Spacewatch	HOF	2.0 km	MPC · JPL
703869	2007 VS_{155}	—	November 5, 2007	Kitt Peak	Spacewatch	·	1.7 km	MPC · JPL
703870	2007 VB_{156}	—	November 5, 2007	Kitt Peak	Spacewatch	·	830 m	MPC · JPL
703871	2007 VK_{158}	—	October 20, 2007	Mount Lemmon	Mount Lemmon Survey	·	1.0 km	MPC · JPL
703872	2007 VE_{160}	—	October 20, 2007	Mount Lemmon	Mount Lemmon Survey	(5)	1.0 km	MPC · JPL
703873	2007 VV_{162}	—	November 5, 2007	Kitt Peak	Spacewatch	·	1.8 km	MPC · JPL
703874	2007 VQ_{163}	—	November 5, 2007	Kitt Peak	Spacewatch	(18466)	2.0 km	MPC · JPL
703875	2007 VT_{163}	—	November 5, 2007	Kitt Peak	Spacewatch	·	540 m	MPC · JPL
703876	2007 VZ_{172}	—	November 2, 2007	Mount Lemmon	Mount Lemmon Survey	·	1.1 km	MPC · JPL
703877	2007 VY_{178}	—	October 20, 2007	Kitt Peak	Spacewatch	AGN	1 km	MPC · JPL
703878	2007 VL_{182}	—	October 12, 2007	Mount Lemmon	Mount Lemmon Survey	·	1.3 km	MPC · JPL
703879	2007 VD_{196}	—	October 12, 2007	Kitt Peak	Spacewatch	MRX	800 m	MPC · JPL
703880	2007 VS_{202}	—	November 7, 2007	Catalina	CSS	·	2.1 km	MPC · JPL
703881	2007 VG_{208}	—	November 3, 2007	Kitt Peak	Spacewatch	·	1.4 km	MPC · JPL
703882	2007 VT_{209}	—	November 7, 2007	Kitt Peak	Spacewatch	·	1.3 km	MPC · JPL
703883	2007 VU_{209}	—	November 7, 2007	Kitt Peak	Spacewatch	·	570 m	MPC · JPL
703884	2007 VW_{209}	—	November 7, 2007	Kitt Peak	Spacewatch	AGN	1.0 km	MPC · JPL
703885	2007 VB_{212}	—	November 9, 2007	Kitt Peak	Spacewatch	EOS	1.2 km	MPC · JPL
703886	2007 VH_{213}	—	November 9, 2007	Kitt Peak	Spacewatch	·	1.7 km	MPC · JPL
703887	2007 VZ_{214}	—	November 9, 2007	Kitt Peak	Spacewatch	HOF	2.3 km	MPC · JPL
703888	2007 VY_{215}	—	November 9, 2007	Kitt Peak	Spacewatch	·	1.7 km	MPC · JPL
703889	2007 VT_{229}	—	November 7, 2007	Kitt Peak	Spacewatch	·	1.0 km	MPC · JPL
703890	2007 VV_{231}	—	November 7, 2007	Kitt Peak	Spacewatch	·	1.6 km	MPC · JPL
703891	2007 VM_{232}	—	November 7, 2007	Kitt Peak	Spacewatch	·	1.4 km	MPC · JPL
703892	2007 VP_{233}	—	November 8, 2007	Kitt Peak	Spacewatch	·	3.6 km	MPC · JPL
703893	2007 VD_{236}	—	November 3, 2007	Kitt Peak	Spacewatch	(5)	1.0 km	MPC · JPL
703894	2007 VL_{238}	—	November 13, 2007	Kitt Peak	Spacewatch	AGN	1.1 km	MPC · JPL
703895	2007 VK_{244}	—	October 9, 2007	Kitt Peak	Spacewatch	EUN	1.0 km	MPC · JPL
703896	2007 VO_{245}	—	November 8, 2007	Catalina	CSS	PHO	660 m	MPC · JPL
703897	2007 VT_{247}	—	November 2, 2007	Mount Lemmon	Mount Lemmon Survey	·	1.3 km	MPC · JPL
703898	2007 VQ_{254}	—	November 15, 2007	Mount Lemmon	Mount Lemmon Survey	·	570 m	MPC · JPL
703899	2007 VS_{255}	—	November 9, 2007	Mount Lemmon	Mount Lemmon Survey	·	520 m	MPC · JPL
703900	2007 VH_{256}	—	January 15, 2004	Kitt Peak	Spacewatch	HOF	2.2 km	MPC · JPL

== 703901–704000 ==
back to top

Designation			Discovery			Properties		Ref
Permanent	Provisional	Named after	Date	Site	Discoverer(s)	Category	Diam.	Ref
703901	2007 VV_{257}	—	November 15, 2007	Mount Lemmon	Mount Lemmon Survey	MAR	780 m	MPC · JPL
703902	2007 VJ_{266}	—	November 13, 2007	Kitt Peak	Spacewatch	·	1.8 km	MPC · JPL
703903	2007 VA_{276}	—	November 13, 2007	Kitt Peak	Spacewatch	·	580 m	MPC · JPL
703904	2007 VP_{276}	—	November 2, 2007	Kitt Peak	Spacewatch	·	1.5 km	MPC · JPL
703905	2007 VR_{276}	—	November 4, 2007	Kitt Peak	Spacewatch	·	1.4 km	MPC · JPL
703906	2007 VS_{278}	—	October 17, 2007	Mount Lemmon	Mount Lemmon Survey	·	610 m	MPC · JPL
703907	2007 VB_{281}	—	November 7, 2007	Kitt Peak	Spacewatch	·	1.3 km	MPC · JPL
703908	2007 VP_{281}	—	November 3, 2007	Kitt Peak	Spacewatch	MAS	620 m	MPC · JPL
703909	2007 VB_{285}	—	November 14, 2007	Kitt Peak	Spacewatch	·	1.8 km	MPC · JPL
703910	2007 VE_{286}	—	November 14, 2007	Kitt Peak	Spacewatch	·	690 m	MPC · JPL
703911	2007 VT_{288}	—	November 13, 2007	Catalina	CSS	·	930 m	MPC · JPL
703912	2007 VG_{289}	—	November 13, 2007	Mount Lemmon	Mount Lemmon Survey	·	1.8 km	MPC · JPL
703913	2007 VD_{292}	—	November 14, 2007	Kitt Peak	Spacewatch	JUN	1.1 km	MPC · JPL
703914	2007 VN_{293}	—	November 5, 2007	Kitt Peak	Spacewatch	·	1.2 km	MPC · JPL
703915	2007 VE_{296}	—	May 14, 1993	Kitt Peak	Spacewatch	EUN	990 m	MPC · JPL
703916	2007 VY_{298}	—	November 3, 2007	Catalina	CSS	·	1.8 km	MPC · JPL
703917	2007 VH_{304}	—	October 18, 2007	Mount Lemmon	Mount Lemmon Survey	·	1.1 km	MPC · JPL
703918	2007 VA_{313}	—	November 5, 2007	Kitt Peak	Spacewatch	AGN	1.0 km	MPC · JPL
703919	2007 VF_{324}	—	November 5, 2007	Kitt Peak	Spacewatch	EUN	1.1 km	MPC · JPL
703920	2007 VG_{335}	—	November 1, 2007	Kitt Peak	Spacewatch	·	2.9 km	MPC · JPL
703921	2007 VV_{336}	—	March 19, 2009	Kitt Peak	Spacewatch	(5)	990 m	MPC · JPL
703922	2007 VA_{337}	—	February 5, 2013	Mount Lemmon	Mount Lemmon Survey	·	1.2 km	MPC · JPL
703923	2007 VK_{338}	—	November 3, 2007	Mount Lemmon	Mount Lemmon Survey	(43176)	3.4 km	MPC · JPL
703924	2007 VP_{338}	—	December 28, 2003	Kitt Peak	Spacewatch	EUN	1.1 km	MPC · JPL
703925	2007 VQ_{339}	—	November 2, 2007	Mount Lemmon	Mount Lemmon Survey	·	820 m	MPC · JPL
703926	2007 VW_{342}	—	December 11, 2014	Mount Lemmon	Mount Lemmon Survey	·	690 m	MPC · JPL
703927	2007 VN_{343}	—	March 31, 2009	Kitt Peak	Spacewatch	·	580 m	MPC · JPL
703928	2007 VO_{343}	—	November 2, 2007	Kitt Peak	Spacewatch	·	1.9 km	MPC · JPL
703929	2007 VT_{343}	—	August 8, 2012	Haleakala	Pan-STARRS 1	·	3.1 km	MPC · JPL
703930	2007 VU_{343}	—	October 6, 2012	Haleakala	Pan-STARRS 1	·	2.0 km	MPC · JPL
703931	2007 VV_{343}	—	November 14, 2007	Kitt Peak	Spacewatch	BRA	1.5 km	MPC · JPL
703932	2007 VN_{344}	—	November 14, 2007	Kitt Peak	Spacewatch	·	1.6 km	MPC · JPL
703933	2007 VO_{344}	—	November 3, 2007	Kitt Peak	Spacewatch	EUN	940 m	MPC · JPL
703934	2007 VM_{345}	—	November 2, 2007	Kitt Peak	Spacewatch	·	1.5 km	MPC · JPL
703935	2007 VX_{346}	—	November 4, 2007	Kitt Peak	Spacewatch	·	600 m	MPC · JPL
703936	2007 VD_{348}	—	April 5, 2014	Haleakala	Pan-STARRS 1	BRG	1.4 km	MPC · JPL
703937	2007 VE_{348}	—	November 14, 2007	Kitt Peak	Spacewatch	·	650 m	MPC · JPL
703938	2007 VG_{348}	—	July 20, 2012	Charleston	R. Holmes	·	2.9 km	MPC · JPL
703939	2007 VK_{348}	—	November 14, 2007	Kitt Peak	Spacewatch	THM	2.0 km	MPC · JPL
703940	2007 VN_{348}	—	November 5, 2007	Mount Lemmon	Mount Lemmon Survey	·	1.8 km	MPC · JPL
703941	2007 VX_{348}	—	November 5, 2007	Mount Lemmon	Mount Lemmon Survey	EUN	1.2 km	MPC · JPL
703942	2007 VJ_{349}	—	November 3, 2007	Kitt Peak	Spacewatch	·	1.7 km	MPC · JPL
703943	2007 VT_{349}	—	October 8, 2013	Mount Lemmon	Mount Lemmon Survey	·	2.5 km	MPC · JPL
703944	2007 VG_{351}	—	April 11, 2010	Mount Lemmon	Mount Lemmon Survey	·	3.0 km	MPC · JPL
703945	2007 VE_{352}	—	January 19, 1996	Kitt Peak	Spacewatch	(194)	1.2 km	MPC · JPL
703946	2007 VO_{354}	—	January 14, 2018	Haleakala	Pan-STARRS 1	·	1.4 km	MPC · JPL
703947	2007 VL_{355}	—	August 31, 2011	Haleakala	Pan-STARRS 1	·	1.4 km	MPC · JPL
703948	2007 VN_{355}	—	September 4, 2011	Haleakala	Pan-STARRS 1	·	1.2 km	MPC · JPL
703949	2007 VO_{355}	—	November 2, 2007	Mount Lemmon	Mount Lemmon Survey	·	1.8 km	MPC · JPL
703950	2007 VH_{356}	—	January 23, 2018	Mount Lemmon	Mount Lemmon Survey	·	1.7 km	MPC · JPL
703951	2007 VJ_{356}	—	March 12, 2014	Mount Lemmon	Mount Lemmon Survey	·	1.6 km	MPC · JPL
703952	2007 VK_{356}	—	November 4, 2007	Kitt Peak	Spacewatch	·	1.9 km	MPC · JPL
703953	2007 VO_{356}	—	September 5, 2007	Mount Lemmon	Mount Lemmon Survey	·	1.5 km	MPC · JPL
703954	2007 VF_{357}	—	October 7, 2016	Haleakala	Pan-STARRS 1	·	1.3 km	MPC · JPL
703955	2007 VH_{359}	—	November 14, 2007	Kitt Peak	Spacewatch	HOF	2.2 km	MPC · JPL
703956	2007 VK_{359}	—	August 2, 2016	Haleakala	Pan-STARRS 1	·	1.7 km	MPC · JPL
703957	2007 VS_{361}	—	November 13, 2017	Haleakala	Pan-STARRS 1	·	1.4 km	MPC · JPL
703958	2007 VE_{362}	—	November 8, 2007	Kitt Peak	Spacewatch	·	600 m	MPC · JPL
703959	2007 VH_{364}	—	November 3, 2007	Kitt Peak	Spacewatch	MRX	770 m	MPC · JPL
703960	2007 VO_{364}	—	November 2, 2007	Kitt Peak	Spacewatch	·	560 m	MPC · JPL
703961	2007 VB_{366}	—	November 8, 2007	Kitt Peak	Spacewatch	·	740 m	MPC · JPL
703962	2007 VE_{366}	—	November 5, 2007	Mount Lemmon	Mount Lemmon Survey	HOF	1.9 km	MPC · JPL
703963	2007 VQ_{366}	—	November 5, 2007	Mount Lemmon	Mount Lemmon Survey	·	2.1 km	MPC · JPL
703964	2007 VV_{366}	—	November 2, 2007	Kitt Peak	Spacewatch	HOF	2.2 km	MPC · JPL
703965	2007 VF_{367}	—	November 2, 2007	Kitt Peak	Spacewatch	HOF	1.9 km	MPC · JPL
703966	2007 VO_{368}	—	November 5, 2007	Mount Lemmon	Mount Lemmon Survey	·	1.5 km	MPC · JPL
703967	2007 VV_{368}	—	November 3, 2007	Kitt Peak	Spacewatch	·	1.3 km	MPC · JPL
703968	2007 VE_{369}	—	November 3, 2007	Kitt Peak	Spacewatch	·	1.5 km	MPC · JPL
703969	2007 VX_{369}	—	November 3, 2007	Mount Lemmon	Mount Lemmon Survey	EUN	1.1 km	MPC · JPL
703970	2007 VL_{370}	—	November 2, 2007	Mount Lemmon	Mount Lemmon Survey	·	1.3 km	MPC · JPL
703971	2007 VM_{370}	—	November 8, 2007	Mount Lemmon	Mount Lemmon Survey	·	3.0 km	MPC · JPL
703972	2007 VN_{370}	—	November 4, 2007	Kitt Peak	Spacewatch	·	1.2 km	MPC · JPL
703973	2007 VO_{370}	—	November 12, 2007	Mount Lemmon	Mount Lemmon Survey	·	1.3 km	MPC · JPL
703974	2007 VQ_{370}	—	November 2, 2007	Kitt Peak	Spacewatch	·	1.4 km	MPC · JPL
703975	2007 VH_{376}	—	November 5, 2007	Mount Lemmon	Mount Lemmon Survey	AST	1.3 km	MPC · JPL
703976	2007 VL_{377}	—	November 5, 2007	Mount Lemmon	Mount Lemmon Survey	KOR	1 km	MPC · JPL
703977	2007 VY_{378}	—	November 8, 2007	Kitt Peak	Spacewatch	·	840 m	MPC · JPL
703978	2007 VN_{379}	—	November 12, 2007	Mount Lemmon	Mount Lemmon Survey	·	1.2 km	MPC · JPL
703979	2007 VK_{381}	—	November 5, 2007	Mount Lemmon	Mount Lemmon Survey	·	850 m	MPC · JPL
703980	2007 WR_{10}	—	November 17, 2007	Mount Lemmon	Mount Lemmon Survey	·	1.1 km	MPC · JPL
703981	2007 WJ_{12}	—	November 12, 2007	Catalina	CSS	T_{j} (2.97) · EUP	3.7 km	MPC · JPL
703982	2007 WK_{16}	—	November 18, 2007	Mount Lemmon	Mount Lemmon Survey	·	1.2 km	MPC · JPL
703983	2007 WD_{18}	—	November 7, 2007	Kitt Peak	Spacewatch	·	500 m	MPC · JPL
703984	2007 WE_{19}	—	November 18, 2007	Mount Lemmon	Mount Lemmon Survey	AGN	810 m	MPC · JPL
703985	2007 WT_{25}	—	December 29, 2003	Kitt Peak	Spacewatch	HOF	2.4 km	MPC · JPL
703986	2007 WC_{33}	—	November 19, 2007	Mount Lemmon	Mount Lemmon Survey	·	1.4 km	MPC · JPL
703987	2007 WN_{34}	—	November 4, 2007	Kitt Peak	Spacewatch	·	600 m	MPC · JPL
703988	2007 WO_{34}	—	November 19, 2007	Mount Lemmon	Mount Lemmon Survey	·	880 m	MPC · JPL
703989	2007 WR_{34}	—	November 8, 2007	Kitt Peak	Spacewatch	EUN	1.1 km	MPC · JPL
703990	2007 WD_{37}	—	November 8, 2007	Kitt Peak	Spacewatch	·	820 m	MPC · JPL
703991	2007 WB_{39}	—	April 16, 2005	Kitt Peak	Spacewatch	·	2.0 km	MPC · JPL
703992	2007 WR_{46}	—	November 3, 2007	Mount Lemmon	Mount Lemmon Survey	·	1.6 km	MPC · JPL
703993	2007 WW_{47}	—	November 20, 2007	Mount Lemmon	Mount Lemmon Survey	·	1.2 km	MPC · JPL
703994	2007 WA_{48}	—	November 12, 2007	Mount Lemmon	Mount Lemmon Survey	·	2.2 km	MPC · JPL
703995	2007 WO_{50}	—	November 20, 2007	Mount Lemmon	Mount Lemmon Survey	·	1.1 km	MPC · JPL
703996	2007 WQ_{53}	—	August 13, 2002	Kitt Peak	Spacewatch	·	1.4 km	MPC · JPL
703997	2007 WR_{59}	—	November 17, 2007	Kitt Peak	Spacewatch	·	980 m	MPC · JPL
703998	2007 WK_{63}	—	November 20, 2007	Kitt Peak	Spacewatch	·	1.4 km	MPC · JPL
703999	2007 WW_{64}	—	November 18, 2007	Mount Lemmon	Mount Lemmon Survey	·	1.9 km	MPC · JPL
704000	2007 WP_{65}	—	January 1, 2009	Kitt Peak	Spacewatch	·	3.2 km	MPC · JPL

back to top

== Meaning of names ==
As minor planet discoveries are confirmed, they are given a permanent number by the IAU's Minor Planet Center (MPC), and the discoverers can then submit names for them, following the IAU's naming conventions. The list below concerns those minor planets in the specified number-range that have received names, and explains the meanings of those names.

Official naming citations of newly named small Solar System bodies are approved and published in a bulletin by IAU's Working Group for Small Bodies Nomenclature (WGSBN). Before May 2021, citations were published in MPC's Minor Planet Circulars for many decades. Recent citations can also be found on the JPL Small-Body Database (SBDB). Until his death in 2016, German astronomer Lutz D. Schmadel compiled these citations into the Dictionary of Minor Planet Names (DMP) and regularly updated the collection.

Based on Paul Herget's The Names of the Minor Planets, Schmadel also researched the unclear origin of numerous asteroids, most of which had been named prior to World War II. This article incorporates text from this source, which is in the public domain: SBDB New namings may only be added to this list below after official publication as the preannouncement of names is condemned. The WGSBN publishes a comprehensive guideline for the naming rules of non-cometary small Solar System bodies.

Named minor planet	Provisional	This minor planet was named for...	Ref · Catalog
703111 Leejungpin	2007 CT_{78}	Jung-pin Lee, Taiwanese educator and leader trainer in scouting.	IAU · 703111
703756 Xijiaouni	2007 UL_{35}	Xijiaouni (Xi'an Jiaotong University), a leading university in China, was established in 1896 and relocated from Shanghai to Xi'an in 1956.	IAU · 703756
