= List of minor planets: 638001–639000 =

The following is a partial list of minor planets, running from minor-planet number 638001 through 639000, inclusive. The primary data for this and other partial lists is based on JPL's "Small-Body Orbital Elements" and data available from the Minor Planet Center. Critical list information is also provided by the MPC, unless otherwise specified from Lowell Observatory. A detailed description of the table's columns and additional sources are given on the main page including a complete list of every page in this series, and a statistical break-up on the dynamical classification of minor planets.

Also see the summary list of all named bodies in numerical and alphabetical order, and the corresponding naming citations for the number range of this particular list. New namings may only be added to this list after official publication, as the preannouncement of names is condemned by the Working Group for Small Bodies Nomenclature of the International Astronomical Union.

Near-Earth obj.	MBA (inner)	MBA (outer)	Centaur
Mars-crosser	MBA (middle)	Jupiter trojan	Trans-Neptunian obj.
Unclassified

== 638001–638100 ==
Designation			Discovery			Properties		Ref
Permanent	Provisional	Named after	Date	Site	Discoverer(s)	Category	Diam.	Ref
638001	2015 RT_{196}	—	May 26, 2014	Haleakala	Pan-STARRS 1	·	1.3 km	MPC · JPL
638002	2015 RX_{200}	—	September 11, 2015	Haleakala	Pan-STARRS 1	·	1.1 km	MPC · JPL
638003	2015 RE_{202}	—	August 27, 2011	Haleakala	Pan-STARRS 1	·	1.2 km	MPC · JPL
638004	2015 RC_{205}	—	May 2, 1997	Kitt Peak	Spacewatch	·	1.4 km	MPC · JPL
638005	2015 RJ_{206}	—	April 26, 2001	Kitt Peak	Spacewatch	·	1.5 km	MPC · JPL
638006	2015 RT_{206}	—	January 28, 2007	Mount Lemmon	Mount Lemmon Survey	·	2.0 km	MPC · JPL
638007	2015 RK_{207}	—	May 1, 2003	Kitt Peak	Spacewatch	·	2.5 km	MPC · JPL
638008	2015 RX_{208}	—	May 23, 2014	Haleakala	Pan-STARRS 1	MAR	890 m	MPC · JPL
638009	2015 RO_{211}	—	March 13, 2010	Mount Lemmon	Mount Lemmon Survey	·	930 m	MPC · JPL
638010	2015 RX_{215}	—	February 7, 2008	Mount Lemmon	Mount Lemmon Survey	·	1.6 km	MPC · JPL
638011	2015 RY_{220}	—	September 11, 2015	Haleakala	Pan-STARRS 1	MAR	770 m	MPC · JPL
638012	2015 RC_{224}	—	April 7, 2002	Cerro Tololo	Deep Ecliptic Survey	·	1.7 km	MPC · JPL
638013	2015 RD_{236}	—	July 7, 2003	Kitt Peak	Spacewatch	·	3.1 km	MPC · JPL
638014	2015 RS_{237}	—	April 18, 2009	Kitt Peak	Spacewatch	GEF	1.1 km	MPC · JPL
638015	2015 RH_{242}	—	November 19, 2006	Catalina	CSS	·	2.1 km	MPC · JPL
638016	2015 RT_{242}	—	December 31, 2007	Mount Lemmon	Mount Lemmon Survey	·	1.5 km	MPC · JPL
638017	2015 RH_{244}	—	January 9, 2013	Kitt Peak	Spacewatch	·	1.3 km	MPC · JPL
638018	2015 RL_{249}	—	November 14, 2002	Kitt Peak	Spacewatch	·	1.2 km	MPC · JPL
638019	2015 RC_{253}	—	September 9, 2015	Haleakala	Pan-STARRS 1	KOR	1.2 km	MPC · JPL
638020	2015 RW_{253}	—	September 18, 2009	Kitt Peak	Spacewatch	·	2.4 km	MPC · JPL
638021	2015 RX_{253}	—	February 1, 2006	Mount Lemmon	Mount Lemmon Survey	·	2.2 km	MPC · JPL
638022	2015 RN_{255}	—	February 26, 2008	Mount Lemmon	Mount Lemmon Survey	·	1.8 km	MPC · JPL
638023	2015 RW_{255}	—	May 6, 2014	Haleakala	Pan-STARRS 1	·	1.0 km	MPC · JPL
638024	2015 RF_{257}	—	March 8, 2013	Haleakala	Pan-STARRS 1	·	1.3 km	MPC · JPL
638025	2015 RM_{259}	—	March 21, 2009	Mount Lemmon	Mount Lemmon Survey	·	1.2 km	MPC · JPL
638026	2015 RV_{260}	—	October 25, 2003	Kitt Peak	Spacewatch	·	1.2 km	MPC · JPL
638027	2015 RG_{261}	—	January 27, 2007	Mount Lemmon	Mount Lemmon Survey	·	1.8 km	MPC · JPL
638028	2015 RW_{261}	—	September 23, 2011	Kitt Peak	Spacewatch	·	960 m	MPC · JPL
638029	2015 RS_{264}	—	August 29, 2006	Kitt Peak	Spacewatch	·	1.5 km	MPC · JPL
638030	2015 RT_{265}	—	December 30, 2007	Kitt Peak	Spacewatch	·	1.3 km	MPC · JPL
638031	2015 RV_{266}	—	September 13, 2002	Palomar	NEAT	EUN	1.0 km	MPC · JPL
638032	2015 RY_{267}	—	November 2, 2010	Kitt Peak	Spacewatch	·	1.6 km	MPC · JPL
638033	2015 RN_{277}	—	January 18, 2005	Catalina	CSS	·	1.4 km	MPC · JPL
638034	2015 RT_{365}	—	January 17, 2009	Kitt Peak	Spacewatch	·	1.0 km	MPC · JPL
638035	2015 RL_{379}	—	September 9, 2015	Haleakala	Pan-STARRS 1	·	1 km	MPC · JPL
638036	2015 SW	—	October 15, 2004	Mount Lemmon	Mount Lemmon Survey	·	1.3 km	MPC · JPL
638037	2015 SL_{2}	—	December 12, 2002	Palomar	NEAT	H	770 m	MPC · JPL
638038	2015 ST_{5}	—	August 27, 2005	Palomar	NEAT	(16286)	2.5 km	MPC · JPL
638039	2015 SA_{6}	—	October 2, 2006	Catalina	CSS	·	2.3 km	MPC · JPL
638040	2015 SC_{8}	—	July 31, 2005	Palomar	NEAT	·	2.5 km	MPC · JPL
638041	2015 SW_{8}	—	July 20, 2002	Palomar	NEAT	·	1.8 km	MPC · JPL
638042	2015 SB_{15}	—	October 23, 2003	Kitt Peak	Spacewatch	·	860 m	MPC · JPL
638043	2015 SX_{15}	—	January 19, 2005	Kitt Peak	Spacewatch	EUN	1.3 km	MPC · JPL
638044	2015 SB_{19}	—	March 10, 2008	Mount Lemmon	Mount Lemmon Survey	·	2.6 km	MPC · JPL
638045	2015 SA_{20}	—	April 5, 2013	Haleakala	Pan-STARRS 1	·	1.7 km	MPC · JPL
638046	2015 SF_{23}	—	September 15, 2003	Palomar	NEAT	·	3.2 km	MPC · JPL
638047	2015 SU_{24}	—	February 28, 2008	Mount Lemmon	Mount Lemmon Survey	·	1.5 km	MPC · JPL
638048	2015 SB_{25}	—	March 19, 2013	Haleakala	Pan-STARRS 1	·	1.5 km	MPC · JPL
638049	2015 SO_{25}	—	December 22, 2003	Kitt Peak	Spacewatch	·	1.4 km	MPC · JPL
638050	2015 SB_{47}	—	September 24, 2015	Mount Lemmon	Mount Lemmon Survey	MAR	1.1 km	MPC · JPL
638051	2015 TU	—	February 20, 2009	Kitt Peak	Spacewatch	H	620 m	MPC · JPL
638052	2015 TV	—	October 27, 2005	Catalina	CSS	H	550 m	MPC · JPL
638053	2015 TM_{2}	—	March 8, 2005	Mount Lemmon	Mount Lemmon Survey	·	1.1 km	MPC · JPL
638054	2015 TD_{5}	—	March 20, 2001	Kitt Peak	Spacewatch	·	1.2 km	MPC · JPL
638055	2015 TO_{5}	—	September 5, 2015	Haleakala	Pan-STARRS 1	·	1.0 km	MPC · JPL
638056	2015 TZ_{10}	—	January 19, 2012	Haleakala	Pan-STARRS 1	SYL	4.2 km	MPC · JPL
638057	2015 TE_{11}	—	September 13, 2007	Kitt Peak	Spacewatch	·	1.1 km	MPC · JPL
638058	2015 TM_{15}	—	October 29, 2003	Kitt Peak	Deep Lens Survey	·	1.0 km	MPC · JPL
638059	2015 TS_{26}	—	October 24, 2011	Haleakala	Pan-STARRS 1	·	1.6 km	MPC · JPL
638060	2015 TO_{28}	—	June 7, 2002	Palomar	NEAT	EUN	1.1 km	MPC · JPL
638061	2015 TZ_{28}	—	September 14, 2007	Catalina	CSS	·	1.5 km	MPC · JPL
638062	2015 TD_{30}	—	October 16, 2007	Catalina	CSS	·	1.3 km	MPC · JPL
638063	2015 TH_{39}	—	May 9, 2010	Mount Lemmon	Mount Lemmon Survey	·	1 km	MPC · JPL
638064	2015 TT_{42}	—	October 6, 1994	Kitt Peak	Spacewatch	·	1.3 km	MPC · JPL
638065	2015 TJ_{44}	—	January 2, 2009	Mount Lemmon	Mount Lemmon Survey	·	1.3 km	MPC · JPL
638066	2015 TK_{47}	—	February 25, 2011	Mount Lemmon	Mount Lemmon Survey	3:2	4.6 km	MPC · JPL
638067	2015 TZ_{48}	—	July 25, 1995	Kitt Peak	Spacewatch	·	1.2 km	MPC · JPL
638068	2015 TR_{49}	—	September 28, 2011	Mount Lemmon	Mount Lemmon Survey	EUN	1.3 km	MPC · JPL
638069	2015 TJ_{59}	—	April 19, 2006	Mount Lemmon	Mount Lemmon Survey	·	940 m	MPC · JPL
638070	2015 TJ_{66}	—	April 21, 2009	Mount Lemmon	Mount Lemmon Survey	·	1.4 km	MPC · JPL
638071	2015 TH_{71}	—	April 26, 2003	Kitt Peak	Spacewatch	·	1.2 km	MPC · JPL
638072	2015 TQ_{72}	—	March 8, 2013	Haleakala	Pan-STARRS 1	·	1.3 km	MPC · JPL
638073	2015 TW_{72}	—	March 18, 2009	Kitt Peak	Spacewatch	·	1.3 km	MPC · JPL
638074	2015 TP_{73}	—	September 9, 2015	Haleakala	Pan-STARRS 1	·	1.0 km	MPC · JPL
638075	2015 TG_{76}	—	December 6, 2011	Haleakala	Pan-STARRS 1	·	1.8 km	MPC · JPL
638076	2015 TX_{76}	—	November 8, 2007	Kitt Peak	Spacewatch	·	1.2 km	MPC · JPL
638077	2015 TM_{77}	—	September 18, 2006	Catalina	CSS	·	1.8 km	MPC · JPL
638078	2015 TD_{78}	—	September 20, 2003	Kitt Peak	Spacewatch	·	3.5 km	MPC · JPL
638079	2015 TN_{80}	—	March 25, 2012	Catalina	CSS	·	3.6 km	MPC · JPL
638080	2015 TZ_{80}	—	October 28, 2011	Mount Lemmon	Mount Lemmon Survey	·	1.2 km	MPC · JPL
638081	2015 TR_{82}	—	April 23, 2009	Mount Lemmon	Mount Lemmon Survey	WIT	950 m	MPC · JPL
638082	2015 TZ_{84}	—	April 22, 2009	Mount Lemmon	Mount Lemmon Survey	·	1.3 km	MPC · JPL
638083	2015 TF_{85}	—	January 1, 2008	Kitt Peak	Spacewatch	·	1.2 km	MPC · JPL
638084	2015 TD_{86}	—	March 8, 2005	Mount Lemmon	Mount Lemmon Survey	NYS	970 m	MPC · JPL
638085	2015 TT_{86}	—	June 7, 2003	Kitt Peak	Spacewatch	·	2.9 km	MPC · JPL
638086	2015 TU_{86}	—	April 11, 2005	Mount Lemmon	Mount Lemmon Survey	·	1.2 km	MPC · JPL
638087	2015 TZ_{87}	—	January 27, 2007	Kitt Peak	Spacewatch	KOR	1.2 km	MPC · JPL
638088	2015 TE_{92}	—	February 18, 2013	Kitt Peak	Spacewatch	·	1.4 km	MPC · JPL
638089	2015 TK_{93}	—	September 16, 2006	Kitt Peak	Spacewatch	·	1.5 km	MPC · JPL
638090	2015 TC_{97}	—	October 25, 2011	Haleakala	Pan-STARRS 1	·	1.2 km	MPC · JPL
638091	2015 TQ_{97}	—	January 11, 2008	Kitt Peak	Spacewatch	·	1.3 km	MPC · JPL
638092	2015 TJ_{98}	—	October 19, 2011	Mount Lemmon	Mount Lemmon Survey	·	950 m	MPC · JPL
638093	2015 TY_{102}	—	April 10, 2013	Haleakala	Pan-STARRS 1	·	1.6 km	MPC · JPL
638094	2015 TK_{103}	—	March 6, 2013	Haleakala	Pan-STARRS 1	KON	2.2 km	MPC · JPL
638095	2015 TU_{105}	—	October 8, 2015	Haleakala	Pan-STARRS 1	·	1.4 km	MPC · JPL
638096	2015 TA_{106}	—	January 30, 2008	Mount Lemmon	Mount Lemmon Survey	·	1.3 km	MPC · JPL
638097	2015 TJ_{106}	—	March 25, 2014	Kitt Peak	Spacewatch	·	1.1 km	MPC · JPL
638098	2015 TU_{107}	—	September 2, 2010	Mount Lemmon	Mount Lemmon Survey	·	1.1 km	MPC · JPL
638099	2015 TN_{112}	—	March 26, 2007	Kitt Peak	Spacewatch	EOS	1.6 km	MPC · JPL
638100	2015 TT_{119}	—	March 31, 2003	Apache Point	SDSS Collaboration	BRA	1.4 km	MPC · JPL

== 638101–638200 ==
back to top

Designation			Discovery			Properties		Ref
Permanent	Provisional	Named after	Date	Site	Discoverer(s)	Category	Diam.	Ref
638101	2015 TF_{121}	—	September 17, 2006	Kitt Peak	Spacewatch	EUN	960 m	MPC · JPL
638102	2015 TA_{127}	—	January 18, 2013	Mount Lemmon	Mount Lemmon Survey	·	1.4 km	MPC · JPL
638103	2015 TF_{133}	—	August 28, 2005	Siding Spring	SSS	GEF	1.5 km	MPC · JPL
638104	2015 TR_{134}	—	October 23, 2011	Haleakala	Pan-STARRS 1	·	1.4 km	MPC · JPL
638105	2015 TM_{138}	—	October 15, 2001	Palomar	NEAT	·	780 m	MPC · JPL
638106	2015 TL_{141}	—	May 7, 2014	Haleakala	Pan-STARRS 1	·	1.2 km	MPC · JPL
638107	2015 TN_{157}	—	October 8, 2007	Kitt Peak	Spacewatch	·	1.1 km	MPC · JPL
638108	2015 TB_{158}	—	November 20, 2006	Kitt Peak	Spacewatch	KOR	1.2 km	MPC · JPL
638109	2015 TS_{159}	—	September 17, 2006	Kitt Peak	Spacewatch	·	1.6 km	MPC · JPL
638110	2015 TJ_{160}	—	October 11, 2007	Mount Lemmon	Mount Lemmon Survey	·	860 m	MPC · JPL
638111	2015 TY_{161}	—	October 3, 2015	Mount Lemmon	Mount Lemmon Survey	·	2.6 km	MPC · JPL
638112	2015 TS_{163}	—	October 30, 2011	Mount Lemmon	Mount Lemmon Survey	·	1.6 km	MPC · JPL
638113	2015 TT_{166}	—	October 3, 2015	Mount Lemmon	Mount Lemmon Survey	·	1.1 km	MPC · JPL
638114	2015 TA_{167}	—	October 6, 2008	Mount Lemmon	Mount Lemmon Survey	V	620 m	MPC · JPL
638115	2015 TR_{169}	—	August 23, 2006	Palomar	NEAT	·	1.7 km	MPC · JPL
638116	2015 TC_{174}	—	March 16, 2012	Mount Lemmon	Mount Lemmon Survey	EOS	1.7 km	MPC · JPL
638117	2015 TF_{199}	—	October 13, 2004	Kitt Peak	Spacewatch	THM	2.6 km	MPC · JPL
638118	2015 TK_{199}	—	September 24, 2000	Socorro	LINEAR	MAS	810 m	MPC · JPL
638119	2015 TJ_{202}	—	May 22, 2006	Kitt Peak	Spacewatch	(5)	1.1 km	MPC · JPL
638120	2015 TL_{203}	—	February 28, 2003	Cerro Tololo	Deep Lens Survey	·	2.5 km	MPC · JPL
638121	2015 TG_{208}	—	October 30, 2002	Haleakala	NEAT	·	1.7 km	MPC · JPL
638122	2015 TL_{208}	—	July 25, 2015	Haleakala	Pan-STARRS 1	·	1.3 km	MPC · JPL
638123	2015 TN_{209}	—	October 11, 2006	Palomar	NEAT	·	2.1 km	MPC · JPL
638124	2015 TS_{213}	—	January 9, 2013	Kitt Peak	Spacewatch	·	1.3 km	MPC · JPL
638125	2015 TJ_{221}	—	December 22, 2012	Haleakala	Pan-STARRS 1	·	1.0 km	MPC · JPL
638126	2015 TD_{227}	—	January 20, 2009	Kitt Peak	Spacewatch	·	1.1 km	MPC · JPL
638127	2015 TR_{227}	—	May 4, 2014	Haleakala	Pan-STARRS 1	EUN	1.1 km	MPC · JPL
638128	2015 TJ_{229}	—	May 7, 2014	Haleakala	Pan-STARRS 1	MAR	900 m	MPC · JPL
638129	2015 TQ_{235}	—	November 16, 2001	Kitt Peak	Spacewatch	·	2.5 km	MPC · JPL
638130	2015 TW_{249}	—	July 28, 2005	Palomar	NEAT	·	640 m	MPC · JPL
638131	2015 TO_{252}	—	March 20, 2007	Kitt Peak	Spacewatch	·	2.9 km	MPC · JPL
638132	2015 TZ_{253}	—	March 18, 2009	Mount Lemmon	Mount Lemmon Survey	·	1.0 km	MPC · JPL
638133	2015 TE_{255}	—	February 15, 2013	Haleakala	Pan-STARRS 1	·	1.1 km	MPC · JPL
638134	2015 TC_{259}	—	November 28, 2011	Kitt Peak	Spacewatch	·	2.4 km	MPC · JPL
638135	2015 TJ_{260}	—	August 20, 2006	Palomar	NEAT	·	1.5 km	MPC · JPL
638136	2015 TB_{265}	—	October 8, 2015	Catalina	CSS	·	990 m	MPC · JPL
638137	2015 TL_{268}	—	January 17, 2009	Kitt Peak	Spacewatch	·	1.3 km	MPC · JPL
638138	2015 TZ_{269}	—	February 24, 2001	Haleakala	NEAT	EUN	1.3 km	MPC · JPL
638139	2015 TA_{273}	—	October 11, 2007	Mount Lemmon	Mount Lemmon Survey	·	980 m	MPC · JPL
638140	2015 TE_{281}	—	March 13, 2013	Mount Lemmon	Mount Lemmon Survey	·	1.6 km	MPC · JPL
638141	2015 TM_{281}	—	November 7, 2007	Kitt Peak	Spacewatch	·	1.3 km	MPC · JPL
638142	2015 TB_{288}	—	October 4, 2006	Mount Lemmon	Mount Lemmon Survey	·	2.5 km	MPC · JPL
638143	2015 TP_{290}	—	September 16, 2003	Kitt Peak	Spacewatch	·	1.5 km	MPC · JPL
638144	2015 TM_{295}	—	September 12, 2015	Haleakala	Pan-STARRS 1	·	800 m	MPC · JPL
638145	2015 TD_{297}	—	April 23, 2014	Haleakala	Pan-STARRS 1	·	970 m	MPC · JPL
638146	2015 TQ_{307}	—	February 7, 2013	Nogales	M. Schwartz, P. R. Holvorcem	MAR	1.2 km	MPC · JPL
638147	2015 TF_{312}	—	February 28, 2014	Haleakala	Pan-STARRS 1	H	470 m	MPC · JPL
638148	2015 TX_{318}	—	September 28, 2001	Palomar	NEAT	AGN	1.3 km	MPC · JPL
638149	2015 TQ_{320}	—	September 12, 2015	Haleakala	Pan-STARRS 1	·	1.4 km	MPC · JPL
638150	2015 TY_{321}	—	July 11, 2010	La Sagra	OAM	·	2.3 km	MPC · JPL
638151	2015 TN_{329}	—	May 24, 2006	Kitt Peak	Spacewatch	·	1.2 km	MPC · JPL
638152	2015 TS_{332}	—	December 27, 2006	Mount Lemmon	Mount Lemmon Survey	EOS	1.6 km	MPC · JPL
638153	2015 TN_{338}	—	February 18, 2008	Mount Lemmon	Mount Lemmon Survey	·	2.5 km	MPC · JPL
638154	2015 TF_{341}	—	April 21, 2002	Kitt Peak	Spacewatch	·	1.7 km	MPC · JPL
638155	2015 TV_{344}	—	May 9, 2013	Haleakala	Pan-STARRS 1	·	2.7 km	MPC · JPL
638156	2015 TH_{346}	—	November 2, 2007	Mount Lemmon	Mount Lemmon Survey	·	1.1 km	MPC · JPL
638157	2015 TL_{351}	—	October 12, 2007	Kitt Peak	Spacewatch	H	440 m	MPC · JPL
638158	2015 TR_{358}	—	August 27, 2006	Kitt Peak	Spacewatch	·	1.5 km	MPC · JPL
638159	2015 TL_{359}	—	September 18, 2006	Catalina	CSS	·	1.8 km	MPC · JPL
638160	2015 TG_{360}	—	March 31, 2009	Kitt Peak	Spacewatch	EUN	1.1 km	MPC · JPL
638161	2015 TD_{365}	—	February 15, 2013	Haleakala	Pan-STARRS 1	·	950 m	MPC · JPL
638162	2015 TR_{365}	—	April 24, 2009	Kitt Peak	Spacewatch	EUN	1.0 km	MPC · JPL
638163	2015 TD_{366}	—	February 28, 2009	Kitt Peak	Spacewatch	·	1.2 km	MPC · JPL
638164	2015 TO_{366}	—	May 18, 2009	Mount Lemmon	Mount Lemmon Survey	·	1.9 km	MPC · JPL
638165	2015 TF_{368}	—	October 10, 2015	Haleakala	Pan-STARRS 1	·	1.3 km	MPC · JPL
638166	2015 TG_{369}	—	November 7, 2007	Kitt Peak	Spacewatch	·	910 m	MPC · JPL
638167	2015 TR_{369}	—	November 17, 2006	Mount Lemmon	Mount Lemmon Survey	AGN	1.3 km	MPC · JPL
638168	2015 TO_{371}	—	September 12, 2007	Mount Lemmon	Mount Lemmon Survey	·	830 m	MPC · JPL
638169	2015 TS_{371}	—	June 4, 2014	Haleakala	Pan-STARRS 1	·	1.2 km	MPC · JPL
638170	2015 TY_{371}	—	October 8, 2015	Haleakala	Pan-STARRS 1	·	1.4 km	MPC · JPL
638171	2015 TL_{379}	—	October 10, 2015	Haleakala	Pan-STARRS 1	NEM	2.1 km	MPC · JPL
638172	2015 TM_{380}	—	January 31, 2004	Apache Point	SDSS Collaboration	HNS	910 m	MPC · JPL
638173	2015 TQ_{381}	—	October 10, 2015	Haleakala	Pan-STARRS 1	·	1.5 km	MPC · JPL
638174	2015 TP_{386}	—	December 1, 2005	Mount Lemmon	Mount Lemmon Survey	·	3.6 km	MPC · JPL
638175	2015 TV_{386}	—	March 18, 2009	Kitt Peak	Spacewatch	·	1.3 km	MPC · JPL
638176	2015 TD_{387}	—	October 9, 2015	Haleakala	Pan-STARRS 1	·	3.1 km	MPC · JPL
638177	2015 TE_{414}	—	October 15, 2015	Haleakala	Pan-STARRS 1	·	1.1 km	MPC · JPL
638178	2015 TV_{444}	—	February 4, 2006	Kitt Peak	Spacewatch	THM	2.0 km	MPC · JPL
638179	2015 TC_{458}	—	March 11, 2005	Kitt Peak	Spacewatch	·	1.2 km	MPC · JPL
638180	2015 UE	—	March 20, 2007	Mauna Kea	D. D. Balam, K. M. Perrett	·	2.1 km	MPC · JPL
638181	2015 UU_{8}	—	August 28, 2006	Catalina	CSS	·	1.5 km	MPC · JPL
638182	2015 UN_{12}	—	September 22, 2003	Kitt Peak	Spacewatch	·	780 m	MPC · JPL
638183	2015 UE_{15}	—	October 10, 2007	Mount Lemmon	Mount Lemmon Survey	EUN	1.1 km	MPC · JPL
638184	2015 UU_{19}	—	August 31, 2005	Kitt Peak	Spacewatch	KOR	1.3 km	MPC · JPL
638185	2015 UF_{22}	—	October 19, 2003	Kitt Peak	Spacewatch	·	790 m	MPC · JPL
638186	2015 UK_{27}	—	September 28, 2011	Kitt Peak	Spacewatch	·	810 m	MPC · JPL
638187	2015 UU_{30}	—	February 14, 2005	Kitt Peak	Spacewatch	·	1.1 km	MPC · JPL
638188	2015 UU_{35}	—	January 3, 2009	Kitt Peak	Spacewatch	·	990 m	MPC · JPL
638189	2015 UL_{42}	—	January 18, 2012	Mount Lemmon	Mount Lemmon Survey	·	2.1 km	MPC · JPL
638190	2015 UJ_{46}	—	December 25, 2010	Kitt Peak	Spacewatch	·	3.5 km	MPC · JPL
638191	2015 UV_{50}	—	March 24, 2001	Kitt Peak	Spacewatch	·	3.4 km	MPC · JPL
638192	2015 UF_{52}	—	June 5, 2005	Catalina	CSS	·	1.9 km	MPC · JPL
638193	2015 UK_{55}	—	March 18, 2010	Mount Lemmon	Mount Lemmon Survey	NYS	1.0 km	MPC · JPL
638194	2015 UZ_{61}	—	May 1, 2003	Kitt Peak	Spacewatch	·	1.2 km	MPC · JPL
638195	2015 UX_{66}	—	May 24, 2006	Vail-Jarnac	Jarnac	H	520 m	MPC · JPL
638196	2015 UZ_{68}	—	August 20, 1998	Kitt Peak	Spacewatch	·	1.3 km	MPC · JPL
638197	2015 UQ_{69}	—	November 20, 2006	Kitt Peak	Spacewatch	·	1.8 km	MPC · JPL
638198	2015 UQ_{70}	—	January 29, 2009	Kitt Peak	Spacewatch	·	1.2 km	MPC · JPL
638199	2015 UF_{82}	—	August 18, 2006	Kitt Peak	Spacewatch	·	1.7 km	MPC · JPL
638200	2015 UV_{82}	—	July 30, 2005	Palomar	NEAT	·	2.4 km	MPC · JPL

== 638201–638300 ==
back to top

Designation			Discovery			Properties		Ref
Permanent	Provisional	Named after	Date	Site	Discoverer(s)	Category	Diam.	Ref
638201	2015 UD_{83}	—	July 15, 2007	Siding Spring	SSS	PHO	960 m	MPC · JPL
638202	2015 UG_{86}	—	December 3, 2007	Kitt Peak	Spacewatch	·	2.0 km	MPC · JPL
638203	2015 UJ_{86}	—	May 26, 2014	Haleakala	Pan-STARRS 1	EUN	1.1 km	MPC · JPL
638204	2015 UA_{88}	—	December 28, 2003	Kitt Peak	Spacewatch	HNS	1.1 km	MPC · JPL
638205	2015 UH_{97}	—	October 25, 2015	Haleakala	Pan-STARRS 1	·	1.4 km	MPC · JPL
638206	2015 VY_{4}	—	July 28, 2011	Haleakala	Pan-STARRS 1	·	1.2 km	MPC · JPL
638207	2015 VN_{6}	—	January 15, 2008	Mount Lemmon	Mount Lemmon Survey	·	1.4 km	MPC · JPL
638208	2015 VV_{12}	—	February 22, 2007	Kitt Peak	Spacewatch	·	2.6 km	MPC · JPL
638209	2015 VM_{14}	—	March 11, 2005	Kitt Peak	Deep Ecliptic Survey	·	1.2 km	MPC · JPL
638210	2015 VC_{15}	—	October 20, 2007	Mount Lemmon	Mount Lemmon Survey	·	1.5 km	MPC · JPL
638211	2015 VG_{22}	—	September 13, 2007	Mount Lemmon	Mount Lemmon Survey	·	830 m	MPC · JPL
638212	2015 VS_{25}	—	February 4, 2006	Kitt Peak	Spacewatch	NYS	1.3 km	MPC · JPL
638213	2015 VG_{27}	—	October 14, 2010	Mount Lemmon	Mount Lemmon Survey	EOS	1.8 km	MPC · JPL
638214	2015 VS_{29}	—	February 13, 2008	Mount Lemmon	Mount Lemmon Survey	·	2.3 km	MPC · JPL
638215	2015 VP_{30}	—	April 12, 2004	Palomar	NEAT	·	2.7 km	MPC · JPL
638216	2015 VD_{31}	—	September 29, 2011	Kitt Peak	Spacewatch	·	1.1 km	MPC · JPL
638217	2015 VK_{33}	—	September 16, 2006	Catalina	CSS	·	2.0 km	MPC · JPL
638218	2015 VG_{36}	—	May 9, 2007	Mount Lemmon	Mount Lemmon Survey	·	2.8 km	MPC · JPL
638219	2015 VE_{37}	—	December 5, 2007	Kitt Peak	Spacewatch	·	1.4 km	MPC · JPL
638220	2015 VQ_{38}	—	December 27, 2008	Saint-Sulpice	B. Christophe	·	1.8 km	MPC · JPL
638221	2015 VL_{39}	—	March 15, 2007	Kitt Peak	Spacewatch	·	3.0 km	MPC · JPL
638222	2015 VZ_{39}	—	January 11, 2008	Mount Lemmon	Mount Lemmon Survey	·	1.3 km	MPC · JPL
638223	2015 VE_{40}	—	August 29, 2006	Kitt Peak	Spacewatch	·	1.7 km	MPC · JPL
638224	2015 VT_{40}	—	April 8, 2013	Haleakala	Pan-STARRS 1	HNS	1.0 km	MPC · JPL
638225	2015 VM_{47}	—	August 9, 2011	Piszkés-tető	K. Sárneczky, A. Pál	·	1.2 km	MPC · JPL
638226	2015 VR_{53}	—	March 28, 2009	Kitt Peak	Spacewatch	EUN	1.2 km	MPC · JPL
638227	2015 VW_{54}	—	March 18, 2004	Kitt Peak	Spacewatch	HOF	2.6 km	MPC · JPL
638228	2015 VA_{55}	—	March 11, 2008	Kitt Peak	Spacewatch	KOR	1.3 km	MPC · JPL
638229	2015 VW_{59}	—	March 1, 2009	Kitt Peak	Spacewatch	·	1.6 km	MPC · JPL
638230	2015 VN_{60}	—	March 25, 2001	Kitt Peak	Deep Ecliptic Survey	·	1.2 km	MPC · JPL
638231	2015 VR_{60}	—	May 24, 2003	Kitt Peak	Spacewatch	·	2.5 km	MPC · JPL
638232	2015 VU_{60}	—	April 4, 2003	Kitt Peak	Spacewatch	·	1.9 km	MPC · JPL
638233	2015 VH_{63}	—	December 1, 2011	Haleakala	Pan-STARRS 1	·	1.2 km	MPC · JPL
638234	2015 VM_{67}	—	October 13, 2006	Kitt Peak	Spacewatch	·	2.2 km	MPC · JPL
638235	2015 VC_{74}	—	September 17, 2006	Kitt Peak	Spacewatch	NEM	1.9 km	MPC · JPL
638236	2015 VU_{74}	—	September 16, 2003	Palomar	NEAT	·	3.7 km	MPC · JPL
638237	2015 VF_{82}	—	February 13, 2012	Haleakala	Pan-STARRS 1	·	2.9 km	MPC · JPL
638238	2015 VR_{82}	—	May 30, 2014	Mount Lemmon	Mount Lemmon Survey	·	1.6 km	MPC · JPL
638239	2015 VX_{84}	—	November 10, 2005	Mount Lemmon	Mount Lemmon Survey	EOS	2.2 km	MPC · JPL
638240	2015 VL_{85}	—	September 7, 2004	Kitt Peak	Spacewatch	·	1.9 km	MPC · JPL
638241	2015 VM_{86}	—	October 15, 2015	Haleakala	Pan-STARRS 1	·	1.9 km	MPC · JPL
638242	2015 VZ_{90}	—	August 19, 2006	Kitt Peak	Spacewatch	·	1.3 km	MPC · JPL
638243	2015 VU_{95}	—	September 20, 2011	Kitt Peak	Spacewatch	·	1.3 km	MPC · JPL
638244	2015 VK_{96}	—	October 20, 2006	Mount Lemmon	Mount Lemmon Survey	·	1.8 km	MPC · JPL
638245	2015 VD_{100}	—	January 19, 2004	Kitt Peak	Spacewatch	·	1.4 km	MPC · JPL
638246	2015 VM_{100}	—	March 11, 2013	Kitt Peak	Spacewatch	·	1.8 km	MPC · JPL
638247	2015 VS_{100}	—	January 13, 2008	Kitt Peak	Spacewatch	·	1.6 km	MPC · JPL
638248	2015 VA_{101}	—	October 12, 2010	Mount Lemmon	Mount Lemmon Survey	·	1.6 km	MPC · JPL
638249	2015 VZ_{105}	—	October 19, 2002	Palomar	NEAT	H	730 m	MPC · JPL
638250	2015 VG_{107}	—	October 27, 2003	Kitt Peak	Spacewatch	·	830 m	MPC · JPL
638251	2015 VX_{111}	—	August 25, 2004	Kitt Peak	Spacewatch	·	1.9 km	MPC · JPL
638252	2015 VY_{111}	—	October 3, 2006	Mount Lemmon	Mount Lemmon Survey	WIT	1.2 km	MPC · JPL
638253	2015 VF_{112}	—	November 8, 2007	Kitt Peak	Spacewatch	·	1.2 km	MPC · JPL
638254	2015 VS_{112}	—	December 3, 2010	Kitt Peak	Spacewatch	·	3.4 km	MPC · JPL
638255	2015 VJ_{113}	—	August 22, 2002	Palomar	NEAT	MAR	1.4 km	MPC · JPL
638256	2015 VM_{116}	—	November 5, 2015	Space Surveillance	Space Surveillance Telescope	EOS	1.6 km	MPC · JPL
638257	2015 VL_{117}	—	November 25, 2011	Haleakala	Pan-STARRS 1	·	1.4 km	MPC · JPL
638258	2015 VP_{118}	—	August 24, 2006	Palomar	NEAT	·	1.7 km	MPC · JPL
638259	2015 VB_{119}	—	September 11, 2002	Palomar	NEAT	·	1.3 km	MPC · JPL
638260	2015 VC_{121}	—	August 23, 2003	Palomar	NEAT	·	3.1 km	MPC · JPL
638261	2015 VJ_{122}	—	November 3, 2004	Anderson Mesa	LONEOS	TIR	3.5 km	MPC · JPL
638262	2015 VU_{122}	—	July 18, 2006	Siding Spring	SSS	·	1.6 km	MPC · JPL
638263	2015 VZ_{126}	—	March 20, 2002	Kitt Peak	Deep Ecliptic Survey	·	2.8 km	MPC · JPL
638264	2015 VN_{128}	—	May 8, 2006	Mount Lemmon	Mount Lemmon Survey	H	510 m	MPC · JPL
638265	2015 VU_{128}	—	February 9, 2006	Palomar	NEAT	·	3.6 km	MPC · JPL
638266	2015 VV_{128}	—	May 4, 2014	Haleakala	Pan-STARRS 1	·	1.4 km	MPC · JPL
638267	2015 VY_{128}	—	October 14, 2001	Kitt Peak	Spacewatch	·	1.8 km	MPC · JPL
638268	2015 VM_{129}	—	May 8, 2005	Kitt Peak	Spacewatch	·	1.3 km	MPC · JPL
638269	2015 VL_{131}	—	August 30, 2011	Haleakala	Pan-STARRS 1	·	1.2 km	MPC · JPL
638270	2015 VT_{135}	—	June 18, 2010	Mount Lemmon	Mount Lemmon Survey	·	1.6 km	MPC · JPL
638271	2015 VD_{136}	—	November 29, 2005	Palomar	NEAT	NAE	2.4 km	MPC · JPL
638272	2015 VM_{137}	—	October 22, 2006	Kitt Peak	Spacewatch	·	2.0 km	MPC · JPL
638273	2015 VL_{145}	—	July 1, 2014	Haleakala	Pan-STARRS 1	·	1.8 km	MPC · JPL
638274	2015 VR_{149}	—	May 2, 2006	Mount Lemmon	Mount Lemmon Survey	·	1.0 km	MPC · JPL
638275	2015 VH_{151}	—	September 19, 2009	Kitt Peak	Spacewatch	·	2.3 km	MPC · JPL
638276	2015 VR_{151}	—	September 11, 2015	Haleakala	Pan-STARRS 1	·	1.0 km	MPC · JPL
638277	2015 VJ_{155}	—	November 18, 2007	Mount Lemmon	Mount Lemmon Survey	·	2.1 km	MPC · JPL
638278	2015 VN_{155}	—	November 8, 2010	Mount Lemmon	Mount Lemmon Survey	·	2.0 km	MPC · JPL
638279	2015 VV_{156}	—	September 14, 2006	Kitt Peak	Spacewatch	·	1.2 km	MPC · JPL
638280	2015 VX_{161}	—	November 11, 2006	Mount Lemmon	Mount Lemmon Survey	·	1.4 km	MPC · JPL
638281	2015 VK_{197}	—	November 1, 2015	Mount Lemmon	Mount Lemmon Survey	EUN	900 m	MPC · JPL
638282	2015 VP_{199}	—	November 6, 2015	Mount Lemmon	Mount Lemmon Survey	·	2.3 km	MPC · JPL
638283	2015 VE_{210}	—	November 14, 2015	Mount Lemmon	Mount Lemmon Survey	EOS	1.2 km	MPC · JPL
638284	2015 VT_{218}	—	January 25, 2009	Kitt Peak	Spacewatch	·	1.0 km	MPC · JPL
638285	2015 WM_{7}	—	August 18, 2014	Haleakala	Pan-STARRS 1	·	2.8 km	MPC · JPL
638286	2015 WS_{18}	—	November 17, 2015	Haleakala	Pan-STARRS 1	·	1.5 km	MPC · JPL
638287	2015 WY_{18}	—	November 2, 2015	Mount Lemmon	Mount Lemmon Survey	·	3.3 km	MPC · JPL
638288	2015 WH_{19}	—	June 21, 2010	Mount Lemmon	Mount Lemmon Survey	·	1.1 km	MPC · JPL
638289	2015 WC_{20}	—	May 21, 2014	Haleakala	Pan-STARRS 1	·	1.2 km	MPC · JPL
638290	2015 XX_{2}	—	July 1, 2011	Haleakala	Pan-STARRS 1	·	1.9 km	MPC · JPL
638291	2015 XM_{9}	—	April 10, 2005	Kitt Peak	Deep Ecliptic Survey	·	940 m	MPC · JPL
638292	2015 XV_{17}	—	January 18, 2008	Kitt Peak	Spacewatch	·	1.2 km	MPC · JPL
638293	2015 XB_{20}	—	December 25, 2005	Kitt Peak	Spacewatch	·	1.8 km	MPC · JPL
638294	2015 XA_{23}	—	September 30, 2003	Kitt Peak	Spacewatch	EOS	2.2 km	MPC · JPL
638295	2015 XJ_{23}	—	November 18, 2011	Mount Lemmon	Mount Lemmon Survey	·	1.1 km	MPC · JPL
638296	2015 XK_{23}	—	April 14, 2008	Kitt Peak	Spacewatch	·	1.8 km	MPC · JPL
638297	2015 XC_{24}	—	February 7, 2008	Mount Lemmon	Mount Lemmon Survey	NEM	2.0 km	MPC · JPL
638298	2015 XV_{26}	—	September 14, 2006	Kitt Peak	Spacewatch	·	1.3 km	MPC · JPL
638299	2015 XO_{28}	—	March 28, 2009	Kitt Peak	Spacewatch	·	1.3 km	MPC · JPL
638300	2015 XM_{35}	—	November 22, 2006	Mount Lemmon	Mount Lemmon Survey	·	1.7 km	MPC · JPL

== 638301–638400 ==
back to top

Designation			Discovery			Properties		Ref
Permanent	Provisional	Named after	Date	Site	Discoverer(s)	Category	Diam.	Ref
638301	2015 XZ_{35}	—	March 25, 2012	Mount Lemmon	Mount Lemmon Survey	·	2.6 km	MPC · JPL
638302	2015 XH_{39}	—	September 2, 2010	Mount Lemmon	Mount Lemmon Survey	·	1.2 km	MPC · JPL
638303	2015 XN_{41}	—	April 9, 2003	Kitt Peak	Spacewatch	·	2.1 km	MPC · JPL
638304	2015 XS_{44}	—	November 13, 2015	Kitt Peak	Spacewatch	·	1.8 km	MPC · JPL
638305	2015 XL_{47}	—	December 31, 2007	Kitt Peak	Spacewatch	·	1.5 km	MPC · JPL
638306	2015 XE_{50}	—	April 21, 2009	Mount Lemmon	Mount Lemmon Survey	·	1.2 km	MPC · JPL
638307	2015 XA_{56}	—	December 29, 2005	Palomar	NEAT	·	2.1 km	MPC · JPL
638308	2015 XP_{58}	—	August 11, 2001	Palomar	NEAT	·	930 m	MPC · JPL
638309	2015 XO_{62}	—	October 22, 2003	Apache Point	SDSS	·	2.9 km	MPC · JPL
638310	2015 XJ_{64}	—	November 18, 2015	Kitt Peak	Spacewatch	·	1.7 km	MPC · JPL
638311	2015 XH_{69}	—	October 3, 2010	Kitt Peak	Spacewatch	DOR	2.0 km	MPC · JPL
638312	2015 XJ_{70}	—	September 18, 2003	Palomar	NEAT	VER	3.4 km	MPC · JPL
638313	2015 XP_{79}	—	December 1, 2011	Haleakala	Pan-STARRS 1	·	1.0 km	MPC · JPL
638314	2015 XW_{83}	—	January 4, 2012	Kitt Peak	Spacewatch	HNS	960 m	MPC · JPL
638315	2015 XH_{85}	—	March 13, 2012	Mount Lemmon	Mount Lemmon Survey	EOS	1.7 km	MPC · JPL
638316	2015 XR_{85}	—	March 4, 2008	Kitt Peak	Spacewatch	·	1.5 km	MPC · JPL
638317	2015 XU_{88}	—	April 8, 2014	Mount Lemmon	Mount Lemmon Survey	PHO	1.0 km	MPC · JPL
638318	2015 XD_{90}	—	August 17, 2006	Palomar	NEAT	(5)	1.3 km	MPC · JPL
638319	2015 XW_{94}	—	March 26, 2001	Cerro Tololo	Deep Lens Survey	·	1.6 km	MPC · JPL
638320	2015 XO_{97}	—	October 31, 2006	Mount Lemmon	Mount Lemmon Survey	·	1.4 km	MPC · JPL
638321	2015 XW_{102}	—	December 4, 2015	Haleakala	Pan-STARRS 1	·	1.4 km	MPC · JPL
638322	2015 XH_{103}	—	June 7, 2013	Haleakala	Pan-STARRS 1	·	1.4 km	MPC · JPL
638323	2015 XT_{103}	—	April 10, 2013	Haleakala	Pan-STARRS 1	WIT	690 m	MPC · JPL
638324	2015 XF_{104}	—	August 20, 2001	Cerro Tololo	Deep Ecliptic Survey	·	1.5 km	MPC · JPL
638325	2015 XL_{105}	—	March 10, 2008	Kitt Peak	Spacewatch	·	2.0 km	MPC · JPL
638326	2015 XS_{110}	—	May 26, 2006	Mount Lemmon	Mount Lemmon Survey	·	1.2 km	MPC · JPL
638327	2015 XT_{115}	—	January 6, 2012	Haleakala	Pan-STARRS 1	·	4.3 km	MPC · JPL
638328	2015 XP_{125}	—	February 13, 2008	Mount Lemmon	Mount Lemmon Survey	526	2.0 km	MPC · JPL
638329	2015 XB_{132}	—	September 27, 2003	Kitt Peak	Spacewatch	·	1.1 km	MPC · JPL
638330	2015 XB_{133}	—	April 6, 2002	Cerro Tololo	Deep Ecliptic Survey	·	2.5 km	MPC · JPL
638331	2015 XJ_{134}	—	September 29, 2009	Mount Lemmon	Mount Lemmon Survey	HYG	2.9 km	MPC · JPL
638332	2015 XT_{141}	—	March 10, 2007	Mount Lemmon	Mount Lemmon Survey	·	1.6 km	MPC · JPL
638333	2015 XW_{146}	—	December 1, 2015	Haleakala	Pan-STARRS 1	·	1.3 km	MPC · JPL
638334	2015 XS_{149}	—	September 15, 2010	Mount Lemmon	Mount Lemmon Survey	·	1.3 km	MPC · JPL
638335	2015 XW_{154}	—	February 14, 2013	Nogales	M. Schwartz, P. R. Holvorcem	MAR	1.4 km	MPC · JPL
638336	2015 XE_{158}	—	November 28, 2011	Mount Lemmon	Mount Lemmon Survey	MAR	840 m	MPC · JPL
638337	2015 XM_{161}	—	October 3, 2015	Haleakala	Pan-STARRS 1	HNS	1.1 km	MPC · JPL
638338	2015 XL_{163}	—	October 23, 2011	Haleakala	Pan-STARRS 1	·	1.5 km	MPC · JPL
638339	2015 XA_{172}	—	June 5, 2010	Nogales	M. Schwartz, P. R. Holvorcem	·	1.7 km	MPC · JPL
638340	2015 XE_{175}	—	September 15, 2006	Kitt Peak	Spacewatch	·	980 m	MPC · JPL
638341	2015 XM_{177}	—	April 16, 2013	Siding Spring	SSS	ADE	1.7 km	MPC · JPL
638342	2015 XF_{182}	—	October 3, 2006	Mount Lemmon	Mount Lemmon Survey	·	1.2 km	MPC · JPL
638343	2015 XQ_{189}	—	January 3, 2012	Mount Lemmon	Mount Lemmon Survey	·	2.5 km	MPC · JPL
638344	2015 XS_{194}	—	October 1, 2005	Kitt Peak	Spacewatch	·	1.6 km	MPC · JPL
638345	2015 XM_{198}	—	October 22, 2006	Kitt Peak	Spacewatch	·	1.2 km	MPC · JPL
638346	2015 XZ_{202}	—	March 1, 2008	Kitt Peak	Spacewatch	·	1.4 km	MPC · JPL
638347	2015 XQ_{206}	—	October 28, 2011	Mount Lemmon	Mount Lemmon Survey	·	1.4 km	MPC · JPL
638348	2015 XP_{209}	—	October 25, 2005	Mount Lemmon	Mount Lemmon Survey	KOR	1.2 km	MPC · JPL
638349	2015 XG_{211}	—	September 1, 2005	Kitt Peak	Spacewatch	·	1.7 km	MPC · JPL
638350	2015 XW_{214}	—	December 30, 2007	Kitt Peak	Spacewatch	·	1.2 km	MPC · JPL
638351	2015 XE_{218}	—	December 5, 2007	Kitt Peak	Spacewatch	·	1.4 km	MPC · JPL
638352	2015 XN_{223}	—	November 22, 2015	Mount Lemmon	Mount Lemmon Survey	·	1.2 km	MPC · JPL
638353	2015 XP_{224}	—	October 31, 2006	Mount Lemmon	Mount Lemmon Survey	NEM	1.8 km	MPC · JPL
638354	2015 XX_{228}	—	November 10, 2015	Mount Lemmon	Mount Lemmon Survey	·	1.4 km	MPC · JPL
638355	2015 XF_{231}	—	August 23, 2014	Haleakala	Pan-STARRS 1	·	2.6 km	MPC · JPL
638356	2015 XY_{240}	—	August 29, 2006	Kitt Peak	Spacewatch	·	1.3 km	MPC · JPL
638357	2015 XY_{243}	—	September 26, 2009	Kitt Peak	Spacewatch	·	2.6 km	MPC · JPL
638358	2015 XE_{255}	—	March 8, 2013	Haleakala	Pan-STARRS 1	·	1.1 km	MPC · JPL
638359	2015 XD_{271}	—	February 27, 2012	Haleakala	Pan-STARRS 1	EOS	1.5 km	MPC · JPL
638360	2015 XN_{282}	—	February 22, 2004	Kitt Peak	Spacewatch	·	1.4 km	MPC · JPL
638361	2015 XX_{284}	—	December 4, 2015	Mount Lemmon	Mount Lemmon Survey	·	1.0 km	MPC · JPL
638362	2015 XM_{286}	—	March 16, 2012	Mount Lemmon	Mount Lemmon Survey	·	1.7 km	MPC · JPL
638363	2015 XU_{291}	—	October 17, 2010	Mount Lemmon	Mount Lemmon Survey	HOF	2.2 km	MPC · JPL
638364	2015 XK_{299}	—	March 8, 2008	Mount Lemmon	Mount Lemmon Survey	·	1.4 km	MPC · JPL
638365	2015 XM_{299}	—	March 4, 2008	Kitt Peak	Spacewatch	·	1.3 km	MPC · JPL
638366	2015 XP_{300}	—	September 11, 2010	Kitt Peak	Spacewatch	NEM	1.9 km	MPC · JPL
638367	2015 XQ_{301}	—	December 4, 2015	Mount Lemmon	Mount Lemmon Survey	·	1.4 km	MPC · JPL
638368	2015 XT_{308}	—	October 16, 2015	Mount Lemmon	Mount Lemmon Survey	·	1.3 km	MPC · JPL
638369	2015 XF_{309}	—	January 20, 2012	Haleakala	Pan-STARRS 1	EOS	2.6 km	MPC · JPL
638370	2015 XJ_{309}	—	August 21, 2006	Kitt Peak	Spacewatch	·	1.2 km	MPC · JPL
638371	2015 XH_{312}	—	May 18, 2002	Palomar	NEAT	EOS	2.3 km	MPC · JPL
638372	2015 XJ_{314}	—	February 28, 2008	Kitt Peak	Spacewatch	AGN	1.1 km	MPC · JPL
638373	2015 XQ_{314}	—	October 23, 2006	Kitt Peak	Spacewatch	·	1.2 km	MPC · JPL
638374	2015 XT_{321}	—	April 5, 2008	Mount Lemmon	Mount Lemmon Survey	·	1.3 km	MPC · JPL
638375	2015 XP_{323}	—	October 1, 2005	Mount Lemmon	Mount Lemmon Survey	·	1.4 km	MPC · JPL
638376	2015 XJ_{324}	—	February 13, 2002	Kitt Peak	Spacewatch	KOR	1.2 km	MPC · JPL
638377	2015 XY_{333}	—	April 19, 2013	Haleakala	Pan-STARRS 1	·	1.8 km	MPC · JPL
638378	2015 XW_{338}	—	April 24, 2007	Mount Lemmon	Mount Lemmon Survey	·	3.0 km	MPC · JPL
638379	2015 XV_{347}	—	March 25, 2009	Mount Lemmon	Mount Lemmon Survey	JUN	1.1 km	MPC · JPL
638380	2015 XO_{353}	—	September 18, 2003	Palomar	NEAT	·	3.4 km	MPC · JPL
638381	2015 XY_{354}	—	July 1, 2014	Haleakala	Pan-STARRS 1	(5)	890 m	MPC · JPL
638382	2015 XK_{355}	—	December 6, 2010	Kitt Peak	Spacewatch	·	4.0 km	MPC · JPL
638383	2015 XC_{357}	—	March 16, 2012	Mount Lemmon	Mount Lemmon Survey	·	3.2 km	MPC · JPL
638384	2015 XH_{359}	—	February 28, 2008	Kitt Peak	Spacewatch	EUN	1.0 km	MPC · JPL
638385	2015 XG_{363}	—	December 7, 2010	Mount Lemmon	Mount Lemmon Survey	·	3.2 km	MPC · JPL
638386	2015 XB_{366}	—	January 28, 2007	Kitt Peak	Spacewatch	·	920 m	MPC · JPL
638387	2015 XA_{367}	—	October 27, 2009	Mount Lemmon	Mount Lemmon Survey	·	3.1 km	MPC · JPL
638388	2015 XT_{367}	—	October 13, 2010	Mount Lemmon	Mount Lemmon Survey	·	2.2 km	MPC · JPL
638389	2015 XD_{368}	—	September 3, 2010	Mount Lemmon	Mount Lemmon Survey	DOR	2.5 km	MPC · JPL
638390	2015 XZ_{368}	—	October 16, 2006	Kitt Peak	Spacewatch	·	1.3 km	MPC · JPL
638391	2015 XU_{372}	—	June 4, 2014	Haleakala	Pan-STARRS 1	·	1.3 km	MPC · JPL
638392	2015 XT_{373}	—	December 1, 2006	Mount Lemmon	Mount Lemmon Survey	·	1.9 km	MPC · JPL
638393	2015 XU_{373}	—	October 28, 2006	Mount Lemmon	Mount Lemmon Survey	·	1.1 km	MPC · JPL
638394	2015 XZ_{375}	—	September 1, 2005	Kitt Peak	Spacewatch	·	1.8 km	MPC · JPL
638395	2015 XC_{380}	—	August 26, 2003	Cerro Tololo	Deep Ecliptic Survey	·	2.7 km	MPC · JPL
638396	2015 XP_{381}	—	November 22, 2006	Catalina	CSS	·	1.8 km	MPC · JPL
638397	2015 XA_{402}	—	December 13, 2010	Mount Lemmon	Mount Lemmon Survey	·	1.7 km	MPC · JPL
638398	2015 XC_{403}	—	December 13, 2010	Mount Lemmon	Mount Lemmon Survey	VER	2.4 km	MPC · JPL
638399	2015 XJ_{403}	—	October 29, 2003	Kitt Peak	Spacewatch	·	2.9 km	MPC · JPL
638400	2015 XP_{403}	—	October 9, 2008	Mount Lemmon	Mount Lemmon Survey	EOS	1.6 km	MPC · JPL

== 638401–638500 ==
back to top

Designation			Discovery			Properties		Ref
Permanent	Provisional	Named after	Date	Site	Discoverer(s)	Category	Diam.	Ref
638401	2015 XS_{403}	—	November 7, 2007	Kitt Peak	Spacewatch	·	1.3 km	MPC · JPL
638402	2015 XA_{404}	—	November 20, 2003	Kitt Peak	Spacewatch	·	2.5 km	MPC · JPL
638403	2015 XG_{404}	—	November 30, 2003	Kitt Peak	Spacewatch	·	2.4 km	MPC · JPL
638404	2015 XL_{406}	—	August 20, 2014	Haleakala	Pan-STARRS 1	·	920 m	MPC · JPL
638405	2015 XF_{407}	—	December 5, 2015	Haleakala	Pan-STARRS 1	(5)	1.1 km	MPC · JPL
638406	2015 XY_{407}	—	October 16, 2006	Catalina	CSS	·	1.5 km	MPC · JPL
638407	2015 XQ_{413}	—	May 12, 2014	Mount Lemmon	Mount Lemmon Survey	EUN	1.1 km	MPC · JPL
638408	2015 XF_{414}	—	September 30, 2006	Kitt Peak	Spacewatch	·	970 m	MPC · JPL
638409	2015 XB_{418}	—	April 3, 2011	Siding Spring	SSS	TIR	3.5 km	MPC · JPL
638410	2015 XZ_{420}	—	August 20, 2014	Haleakala	Pan-STARRS 1	·	1.2 km	MPC · JPL
638411	2015 YM_{5}	—	September 20, 2003	Kitt Peak	Spacewatch	·	3.9 km	MPC · JPL
638412	2015 YF_{7}	—	November 12, 1999	Socorro	LINEAR	·	2.5 km	MPC · JPL
638413	2015 YJ_{7}	—	December 14, 2015	Haleakala	Pan-STARRS 1	·	1.6 km	MPC · JPL
638414	2015 YF_{11}	—	November 17, 2007	Kitt Peak	Spacewatch	·	1.3 km	MPC · JPL
638415	2015 YE_{13}	—	December 31, 2015	Haleakala	Pan-STARRS 1	·	2.5 km	MPC · JPL
638416	2015 YC_{22}	—	January 23, 2011	Mount Lemmon	Mount Lemmon Survey	·	1.7 km	MPC · JPL
638417	2015 YR_{27}	—	December 31, 2015	Haleakala	Pan-STARRS 1	·	2.5 km	MPC · JPL
638418	2015 YZ_{36}	—	December 19, 2015	Mount Lemmon	Mount Lemmon Survey	EUN	1.0 km	MPC · JPL
638419	2016 AS_{1}	—	May 1, 2006	Kitt Peak	Spacewatch	VER	2.7 km	MPC · JPL
638420	2016 AF_{6}	—	December 2, 2010	Mount Lemmon	Mount Lemmon Survey	·	2.3 km	MPC · JPL
638421	2016 AR_{13}	—	November 12, 2001	Apache Point	SDSS Collaboration	L5	7.8 km	MPC · JPL
638422	2016 AT_{18}	—	November 28, 2010	Mount Lemmon	Mount Lemmon Survey	·	1.7 km	MPC · JPL
638423	2016 AO_{19}	—	April 3, 2008	Kitt Peak	Spacewatch	·	1.9 km	MPC · JPL
638424	2016 AT_{20}	—	October 22, 2005	Kitt Peak	Spacewatch	·	1.6 km	MPC · JPL
638425	2016 AP_{23}	—	February 24, 2006	Kitt Peak	Spacewatch	·	2.1 km	MPC · JPL
638426	2016 AA_{24}	—	April 18, 2007	Mount Lemmon	Mount Lemmon Survey	·	1.5 km	MPC · JPL
638427	2016 AM_{25}	—	March 1, 2012	Mount Lemmon	Mount Lemmon Survey	·	1.4 km	MPC · JPL
638428	2016 AT_{29}	—	November 27, 2010	Mount Lemmon	Mount Lemmon Survey	·	1.4 km	MPC · JPL
638429	2016 AD_{30}	—	January 2, 2011	Mount Lemmon	Mount Lemmon Survey	·	2.4 km	MPC · JPL
638430	2016 AT_{31}	—	November 8, 2010	Mount Lemmon	Mount Lemmon Survey	NEM	1.6 km	MPC · JPL
638431	2016 AG_{34}	—	September 30, 2005	Mount Lemmon	Mount Lemmon Survey	·	1.6 km	MPC · JPL
638432	2016 AD_{35}	—	March 12, 2008	Kitt Peak	Spacewatch	·	1.4 km	MPC · JPL
638433	2016 AX_{35}	—	August 15, 2009	Kitt Peak	Spacewatch	KOR	1.2 km	MPC · JPL
638434	2016 AS_{39}	—	January 10, 2007	Mount Lemmon	Mount Lemmon Survey	DOR	2.1 km	MPC · JPL
638435	2016 AD_{41}	—	November 24, 2009	Kitt Peak	Spacewatch	·	2.5 km	MPC · JPL
638436	2016 AZ_{43}	—	July 13, 2013	Mount Lemmon	Mount Lemmon Survey	·	2.0 km	MPC · JPL
638437	2016 AF_{44}	—	December 4, 2005	Mount Lemmon	Mount Lemmon Survey	·	2.3 km	MPC · JPL
638438	2016 AL_{45}	—	November 8, 2010	Mount Lemmon	Mount Lemmon Survey	·	1.4 km	MPC · JPL
638439	2016 AB_{47}	—	June 23, 2009	Mount Lemmon	Mount Lemmon Survey	·	2.3 km	MPC · JPL
638440	2016 AC_{49}	—	May 31, 2003	Cerro Tololo	Deep Ecliptic Survey	KOR	1.3 km	MPC · JPL
638441	2016 AO_{54}	—	August 6, 2014	Haleakala	Pan-STARRS 1	·	1.9 km	MPC · JPL
638442	2016 AP_{54}	—	September 29, 2003	Kitt Peak	Spacewatch	·	2.2 km	MPC · JPL
638443	2016 AS_{55}	—	April 7, 2008	Kitt Peak	Spacewatch	AGN	1.1 km	MPC · JPL
638444	2016 AS_{58}	—	October 26, 2014	Mount Lemmon	Mount Lemmon Survey	·	2.9 km	MPC · JPL
638445	2016 AG_{59}	—	March 9, 2011	Mount Lemmon	Mount Lemmon Survey	·	2.6 km	MPC · JPL
638446	2016 AE_{60}	—	January 21, 2012	Kitt Peak	Spacewatch	·	1.4 km	MPC · JPL
638447	2016 AE_{62}	—	March 29, 2008	Kitt Peak	Spacewatch	·	1.7 km	MPC · JPL
638448	2016 AO_{62}	—	January 4, 2016	Haleakala	Pan-STARRS 1	NEM	1.6 km	MPC · JPL
638449	2016 AE_{64}	—	December 16, 1999	Kitt Peak	Spacewatch	·	3.0 km	MPC · JPL
638450	2016 AY_{66}	—	September 28, 2003	Kitt Peak	Spacewatch	·	2.7 km	MPC · JPL
638451	2016 AK_{68}	—	December 3, 2004	Kitt Peak	Spacewatch	HYG	2.8 km	MPC · JPL
638452	2016 AV_{68}	—	December 14, 2006	Mount Lemmon	Mount Lemmon Survey	·	1.5 km	MPC · JPL
638453	2016 AU_{69}	—	March 10, 2007	Kitt Peak	Spacewatch	KOR	1.2 km	MPC · JPL
638454	2016 AP_{75}	—	May 20, 2006	Kitt Peak	Spacewatch	TIR	3.5 km	MPC · JPL
638455	2016 AH_{80}	—	March 16, 2012	Mount Lemmon	Mount Lemmon Survey	·	1.4 km	MPC · JPL
638456	2016 AR_{80}	—	December 7, 2005	Kitt Peak	Spacewatch	·	1.9 km	MPC · JPL
638457	2016 AQ_{84}	—	May 27, 2014	Mount Lemmon	Mount Lemmon Survey	·	1.7 km	MPC · JPL
638458	2016 AN_{85}	—	October 19, 2006	Catalina	CSS	·	1.6 km	MPC · JPL
638459	2016 AN_{86}	—	January 3, 2012	Mount Lemmon	Mount Lemmon Survey	·	1.3 km	MPC · JPL
638460	2016 AX_{86}	—	August 20, 2001	Cerro Tololo	Deep Ecliptic Survey	·	1.3 km	MPC · JPL
638461	2016 AY_{87}	—	December 9, 2015	Haleakala	Pan-STARRS 1	·	1.1 km	MPC · JPL
638462	2016 AN_{95}	—	October 21, 2008	Mount Lemmon	Mount Lemmon Survey	·	2.8 km	MPC · JPL
638463	2016 AW_{96}	—	September 16, 2014	Haleakala	Pan-STARRS 1	·	1.8 km	MPC · JPL
638464	2016 AX_{96}	—	November 5, 2005	Kitt Peak	Spacewatch	AGN	950 m	MPC · JPL
638465	2016 AW_{97}	—	April 10, 2008	Catalina	CSS	(194)	1.7 km	MPC · JPL
638466	2016 AF_{101}	—	November 4, 2005	Kitt Peak	Spacewatch	·	1.7 km	MPC · JPL
638467	2016 AA_{102}	—	January 7, 2016	Haleakala	Pan-STARRS 1	WIT	790 m	MPC · JPL
638468	2016 AW_{104}	—	September 16, 2003	Kitt Peak	Spacewatch	·	2.0 km	MPC · JPL
638469	2016 AV_{108}	—	October 28, 2006	Mount Lemmon	Mount Lemmon Survey	·	1.4 km	MPC · JPL
638470	2016 AW_{108}	—	October 17, 2014	Mount Lemmon	Mount Lemmon Survey	·	1.7 km	MPC · JPL
638471	2016 AY_{110}	—	August 25, 2014	Haleakala	Pan-STARRS 1	·	1.7 km	MPC · JPL
638472	2016 AH_{112}	—	October 16, 2009	Mount Lemmon	Mount Lemmon Survey	KOR	1.1 km	MPC · JPL
638473	2016 AP_{115}	—	February 14, 2010	Catalina	CSS	·	3.2 km	MPC · JPL
638474	2016 AS_{115}	—	September 26, 1997	Mauna Kea	Shanks, R., Veillet, C.	·	3.0 km	MPC · JPL
638475	2016 AC_{117}	—	December 10, 2010	Mount Lemmon	Mount Lemmon Survey	HOF	2.3 km	MPC · JPL
638476	2016 AT_{117}	—	August 18, 2009	Kitt Peak	Spacewatch	·	1.4 km	MPC · JPL
638477	2016 AW_{124}	—	January 8, 2016	Haleakala	Pan-STARRS 1	·	1.8 km	MPC · JPL
638478	2016 AA_{126}	—	February 8, 2011	Mount Lemmon	Mount Lemmon Survey	KOR	1.1 km	MPC · JPL
638479	2016 AW_{126}	—	April 13, 2011	Mount Lemmon	Mount Lemmon Survey	·	3.1 km	MPC · JPL
638480	2016 AW_{128}	—	November 26, 2014	Haleakala	Pan-STARRS 1	·	3.1 km	MPC · JPL
638481	2016 AS_{135}	—	September 4, 2008	Kitt Peak	Spacewatch	·	2.7 km	MPC · JPL
638482	2016 AG_{149}	—	July 29, 2009	Kitt Peak	Spacewatch	·	2.0 km	MPC · JPL
638483	2016 AR_{158}	—	March 14, 2005	Mount Lemmon	Mount Lemmon Survey	·	3.3 km	MPC · JPL
638484	2016 AS_{159}	—	June 14, 2006	Palomar	NEAT	TIR	4.1 km	MPC · JPL
638485	2016 AG_{168}	—	March 28, 2012	Kitt Peak	Spacewatch	·	1.5 km	MPC · JPL
638486	2016 AO_{168}	—	September 6, 2008	Mount Lemmon	Mount Lemmon Survey	·	3.4 km	MPC · JPL
638487	2016 AJ_{169}	—	May 29, 2008	Mount Lemmon	Mount Lemmon Survey	·	2.3 km	MPC · JPL
638488	2016 AA_{183}	—	September 24, 2003	Palomar	NEAT	·	2.4 km	MPC · JPL
638489	2016 AW_{186}	—	October 5, 2010	Moletai	K. Černis	·	2.0 km	MPC · JPL
638490	2016 AJ_{187}	—	April 11, 2005	Kitt Peak	Spacewatch	·	1.6 km	MPC · JPL
638491	2016 AP_{191}	—	December 30, 2005	Mount Lemmon	Mount Lemmon Survey	·	2.2 km	MPC · JPL
638492	2016 AR_{195}	—	April 14, 2008	Mount Lemmon	Mount Lemmon Survey	L5	7.5 km	MPC · JPL
638493	2016 AU_{209}	—	May 3, 2011	Kitt Peak	Spacewatch	·	2.6 km	MPC · JPL
638494	2016 AC_{217}	—	March 30, 2011	Haleakala	Pan-STARRS 1	·	2.6 km	MPC · JPL
638495	2016 AF_{218}	—	August 27, 2014	Haleakala	Pan-STARRS 1	·	1.7 km	MPC · JPL
638496	2016 AB_{219}	—	June 11, 2000	Kitt Peak	Spacewatch	·	3.6 km	MPC · JPL
638497	2016 AG_{219}	—	September 20, 2014	Haleakala	Pan-STARRS 1	·	1.3 km	MPC · JPL
638498	2016 AJ_{219}	—	January 14, 2016	Haleakala	Pan-STARRS 1	·	1.2 km	MPC · JPL
638499	2016 AZ_{219}	—	January 26, 2006	Mount Lemmon	Mount Lemmon Survey	·	1.7 km	MPC · JPL
638500	2016 AG_{220}	—	October 26, 2008	Mount Lemmon	Mount Lemmon Survey	·	3.1 km	MPC · JPL

== 638501–638600 ==
back to top

Designation			Discovery			Properties		Ref
Permanent	Provisional	Named after	Date	Site	Discoverer(s)	Category	Diam.	Ref
638501	2016 AP_{220}	—	November 13, 2006	Catalina	CSS	ADE	1.9 km	MPC · JPL
638502	2016 AK_{221}	—	January 4, 2016	Haleakala	Pan-STARRS 1	·	1.6 km	MPC · JPL
638503	2016 AX_{222}	—	January 3, 2011	Mount Lemmon	Mount Lemmon Survey	·	1.3 km	MPC · JPL
638504	2016 AR_{223}	—	April 5, 2006	Siding Spring	SSS	·	3.1 km	MPC · JPL
638505	2016 AV_{224}	—	July 15, 2013	Haleakala	Pan-STARRS 1	KOR	1.3 km	MPC · JPL
638506	2016 AU_{230}	—	December 3, 2010	Kitt Peak	Spacewatch	·	2.1 km	MPC · JPL
638507	2016 AG_{233}	—	February 12, 2004	Kitt Peak	Spacewatch	·	1.1 km	MPC · JPL
638508	2016 AJ_{234}	—	September 10, 2004	Kitt Peak	Spacewatch	KOR	1.2 km	MPC · JPL
638509	2016 AT_{234}	—	September 23, 2014	Mount Lemmon	Mount Lemmon Survey	ADE	1.3 km	MPC · JPL
638510	2016 AV_{235}	—	November 17, 2009	Kitt Peak	Spacewatch	HYG	3.1 km	MPC · JPL
638511	2016 AF_{236}	—	August 9, 2013	Haleakala	Pan-STARRS 1	·	1.9 km	MPC · JPL
638512	2016 AO_{236}	—	January 4, 2016	Haleakala	Pan-STARRS 1	·	1.3 km	MPC · JPL
638513	2016 AW_{236}	—	October 2, 2008	Kitt Peak	Spacewatch	·	2.6 km	MPC · JPL
638514	2016 AA_{237}	—	October 26, 2005	Kitt Peak	Spacewatch	AST	1.7 km	MPC · JPL
638515	2016 AE_{239}	—	October 2, 2010	Mount Lemmon	Mount Lemmon Survey	·	1.8 km	MPC · JPL
638516	2016 AF_{239}	—	June 18, 2013	Haleakala	Pan-STARRS 1	·	1.7 km	MPC · JPL
638517	2016 AM_{239}	—	December 25, 2010	Mount Lemmon	Mount Lemmon Survey	·	2.2 km	MPC · JPL
638518	2016 AP_{239}	—	January 19, 2012	Kitt Peak	Spacewatch	KON	1.9 km	MPC · JPL
638519	2016 AR_{242}	—	August 27, 2014	Haleakala	Pan-STARRS 1	·	1.2 km	MPC · JPL
638520	2016 AG_{243}	—	December 5, 2010	Mount Lemmon	Mount Lemmon Survey	·	1.4 km	MPC · JPL
638521	2016 AL_{244}	—	April 13, 2012	Haleakala	Pan-STARRS 1	·	1.5 km	MPC · JPL
638522	2016 AU_{245}	—	January 3, 2016	Haleakala	Pan-STARRS 1	·	1.4 km	MPC · JPL
638523	2016 AB_{247}	—	November 16, 2014	Kitt Peak	Spacewatch	·	1.8 km	MPC · JPL
638524	2016 AE_{248}	—	January 4, 2016	Haleakala	Pan-STARRS 1	·	1.8 km	MPC · JPL
638525	2016 AG_{250}	—	January 4, 2016	Haleakala	Pan-STARRS 1	·	1.0 km	MPC · JPL
638526	2016 AW_{251}	—	January 4, 2016	Haleakala	Pan-STARRS 1	·	1.3 km	MPC · JPL
638527	2016 AK_{252}	—	January 4, 2016	Haleakala	Pan-STARRS 1	·	3.1 km	MPC · JPL
638528	2016 AK_{253}	—	September 27, 2006	Mount Lemmon	Mount Lemmon Survey	(5)	1.2 km	MPC · JPL
638529	2016 AR_{253}	—	January 19, 2012	Haleakala	Pan-STARRS 1	EUN	1.1 km	MPC · JPL
638530	2016 AX_{256}	—	January 7, 2016	Haleakala	Pan-STARRS 1	HOF	2.2 km	MPC · JPL
638531	2016 AL_{258}	—	January 8, 2016	Haleakala	Pan-STARRS 1	KOR	1.0 km	MPC · JPL
638532	2016 AF_{260}	—	October 28, 2014	Haleakala	Pan-STARRS 1	WIT	770 m	MPC · JPL
638533	2016 AK_{261}	—	October 24, 2003	Apache Point	SDSS Collaboration	EOS	1.7 km	MPC · JPL
638534	2016 AW_{265}	—	November 26, 2014	Haleakala	Pan-STARRS 1	·	1.9 km	MPC · JPL
638535	2016 AY_{266}	—	January 11, 2016	Haleakala	Pan-STARRS 1	·	2.5 km	MPC · JPL
638536	2016 AG_{271}	—	September 23, 2008	Mount Lemmon	Mount Lemmon Survey	·	3.1 km	MPC · JPL
638537	2016 AD_{272}	—	January 14, 2016	Haleakala	Pan-STARRS 1	·	1.1 km	MPC · JPL
638538	2016 AR_{273}	—	January 14, 2016	Haleakala	Pan-STARRS 1	·	1.6 km	MPC · JPL
638539	2016 AZ_{273}	—	August 8, 2013	Haleakala	Pan-STARRS 1	·	1.5 km	MPC · JPL
638540	2016 AJ_{276}	—	January 14, 2016	Haleakala	Pan-STARRS 1	·	1.2 km	MPC · JPL
638541	2016 AS_{277}	—	January 2, 2016	Mount Lemmon	Mount Lemmon Survey	·	2.1 km	MPC · JPL
638542	2016 AP_{311}	—	January 1, 2016	Mount Lemmon	Mount Lemmon Survey	L5	8.2 km	MPC · JPL
638543	2016 AQ_{337}	—	October 14, 2014	Mount Lemmon	Mount Lemmon Survey	·	1.6 km	MPC · JPL
638544	2016 AC_{355}	—	November 8, 2013	Mount Lemmon	Mount Lemmon Survey	L5	6.4 km	MPC · JPL
638545	2016 AA_{358}	—	January 4, 2016	Haleakala	Pan-STARRS 1	·	2.1 km	MPC · JPL
638546	2016 AX_{360}	—	January 2, 2016	Haleakala	Pan-STARRS 1	·	1.7 km	MPC · JPL
638547	2016 AK_{375}	—	November 29, 2014	Mount Lemmon	Mount Lemmon Survey	L5	5.7 km	MPC · JPL
638548	2016 AH_{376}	—	January 8, 2016	Haleakala	Pan-STARRS 1	·	1.4 km	MPC · JPL
638549	2016 AR_{379}	—	November 15, 2010	Mount Lemmon	Mount Lemmon Survey	·	1.5 km	MPC · JPL
638550	2016 BF_{2}	—	May 3, 2008	Kitt Peak	Spacewatch	·	2.3 km	MPC · JPL
638551	2016 BW_{10}	—	May 31, 2006	Mount Lemmon	Mount Lemmon Survey	·	2.8 km	MPC · JPL
638552	2016 BV_{12}	—	September 25, 2005	Palomar	NEAT	·	2.3 km	MPC · JPL
638553	2016 BY_{12}	—	May 15, 2013	Haleakala	Pan-STARRS 1	·	1.3 km	MPC · JPL
638554	2016 BF_{15}	—	January 1, 2003	Socorro	LINEAR	·	1.6 km	MPC · JPL
638555	2016 BS_{19}	—	March 10, 2007	Kitt Peak	Spacewatch	KOR	1.3 km	MPC · JPL
638556	2016 BU_{20}	—	May 15, 2013	Haleakala	Pan-STARRS 1	·	2.1 km	MPC · JPL
638557	2016 BD_{23}	—	March 12, 2011	Mount Lemmon	Mount Lemmon Survey	·	2.1 km	MPC · JPL
638558	2016 BD_{24}	—	December 15, 1999	Kitt Peak	Spacewatch	·	2.7 km	MPC · JPL
638559	2016 BM_{27}	—	March 13, 2011	Mount Lemmon	Mount Lemmon Survey	EOS	1.7 km	MPC · JPL
638560	2016 BF_{29}	—	November 25, 2005	Kitt Peak	Spacewatch	·	1.6 km	MPC · JPL
638561	2016 BU_{30}	—	February 25, 2011	Mount Lemmon	Mount Lemmon Survey	·	2.5 km	MPC · JPL
638562	2016 BX_{31}	—	September 22, 2009	Mount Lemmon	Mount Lemmon Survey	·	1.9 km	MPC · JPL
638563	2016 BC_{33}	—	July 13, 2013	Haleakala	Pan-STARRS 1	·	3.1 km	MPC · JPL
638564	2016 BM_{40}	—	October 28, 2005	Kitt Peak	Spacewatch	(12739)	1.4 km	MPC · JPL
638565	2016 BV_{40}	—	October 2, 2014	Haleakala	Pan-STARRS 1	HOF	2.2 km	MPC · JPL
638566	2016 BZ_{41}	—	January 23, 2006	Kitt Peak	Spacewatch	·	1.7 km	MPC · JPL
638567	2016 BL_{43}	—	January 29, 2016	Kitt Peak	Spacewatch	·	1.6 km	MPC · JPL
638568	2016 BL_{44}	—	January 27, 2003	Haleakala	NEAT	JUN	1.4 km	MPC · JPL
638569	2016 BL_{48}	—	November 15, 2007	Mount Lemmon	Mount Lemmon Survey	·	1.3 km	MPC · JPL
638570	2016 BS_{49}	—	October 11, 1999	Mauna Kea	D. D. Balam	L5	8.7 km	MPC · JPL
638571	2016 BO_{51}	—	December 10, 2005	Kitt Peak	Spacewatch	·	2.1 km	MPC · JPL
638572	2016 BQ_{52}	—	August 18, 2009	Kitt Peak	Spacewatch	·	1.9 km	MPC · JPL
638573	2016 BW_{52}	—	November 29, 2003	Kitt Peak	Spacewatch	·	2.6 km	MPC · JPL
638574	2016 BQ_{54}	—	March 15, 2012	Mount Lemmon	Mount Lemmon Survey	·	1.5 km	MPC · JPL
638575	2016 BG_{56}	—	May 26, 2014	Haleakala	Pan-STARRS 1	·	1.3 km	MPC · JPL
638576	2016 BR_{56}	—	February 21, 2007	Mount Lemmon	Mount Lemmon Survey	HOF	2.1 km	MPC · JPL
638577	2016 BQ_{57}	—	December 2, 2005	Mauna Kea	A. Boattini	EOS	1.5 km	MPC · JPL
638578	2016 BX_{57}	—	October 26, 2014	Mount Lemmon	Mount Lemmon Survey	·	1.5 km	MPC · JPL
638579	2016 BK_{58}	—	October 7, 2005	Mount Lemmon	Mount Lemmon Survey	·	1.7 km	MPC · JPL
638580	2016 BS_{59}	—	January 30, 2016	Mount Lemmon	Mount Lemmon Survey	·	1.5 km	MPC · JPL
638581	2016 BV_{59}	—	October 30, 2005	Kitt Peak	Spacewatch	·	1.5 km	MPC · JPL
638582	2016 BG_{63}	—	November 10, 2009	Kitt Peak	Spacewatch	·	1.7 km	MPC · JPL
638583	2016 BG_{64}	—	August 9, 2013	Simeïs	Bakanas, E.	·	2.6 km	MPC · JPL
638584	2016 BN_{64}	—	January 29, 2016	Kitt Peak	Spacewatch	·	1.5 km	MPC · JPL
638585	2016 BA_{68}	—	March 27, 2012	Kitt Peak	Spacewatch	·	1.9 km	MPC · JPL
638586	2016 BE_{70}	—	December 30, 2005	Kitt Peak	Spacewatch	·	1.5 km	MPC · JPL
638587	2016 BJ_{73}	—	March 26, 2001	Kitt Peak	Spacewatch	·	2.1 km	MPC · JPL
638588	2016 BM_{73}	—	August 31, 2014	Haleakala	Pan-STARRS 1	·	1.3 km	MPC · JPL
638589	2016 BA_{88}	—	February 9, 2005	Mount Lemmon	Mount Lemmon Survey	·	2.4 km	MPC · JPL
638590	2016 BS_{88}	—	September 2, 2005	Palomar	NEAT	·	1.7 km	MPC · JPL
638591	2016 BQ_{89}	—	January 27, 2007	Mount Lemmon	Mount Lemmon Survey	·	2.0 km	MPC · JPL
638592	2016 BM_{93}	—	March 21, 2012	Mount Lemmon	Mount Lemmon Survey	·	1.6 km	MPC · JPL
638593	2016 BT_{93}	—	January 8, 2011	Mount Lemmon	Mount Lemmon Survey	·	1.8 km	MPC · JPL
638594	2016 BV_{95}	—	March 14, 2011	Kitt Peak	Spacewatch	·	2.0 km	MPC · JPL
638595	2016 BC_{104}	—	June 26, 2012	Mayhill-ISON	L. Elenin	·	3.4 km	MPC · JPL
638596	2016 BP_{104}	—	July 13, 2013	Haleakala	Pan-STARRS 1	KOR	910 m	MPC · JPL
638597	2016 BQ_{104}	—	July 14, 2013	Haleakala	Pan-STARRS 1	·	1.3 km	MPC · JPL
638598	2016 BH_{105}	—	July 14, 2013	Haleakala	Pan-STARRS 1	·	1.4 km	MPC · JPL
638599	2016 BK_{112}	—	January 19, 2016	Mount Lemmon	Mount Lemmon Survey	KOR	1.1 km	MPC · JPL
638600	2016 BQ_{116}	—	January 31, 2016	Haleakala	Pan-STARRS 1	KOR	1.1 km	MPC · JPL

== 638601–638700 ==
back to top

Designation			Discovery			Properties		Ref
Permanent	Provisional	Named after	Date	Site	Discoverer(s)	Category	Diam.	Ref
638601	2016 BZ_{117}	—	January 17, 2016	Haleakala	Pan-STARRS 1	·	2.3 km	MPC · JPL
638602	2016 BX_{124}	—	January 18, 2016	Haleakala	Pan-STARRS 1	EOS	1.6 km	MPC · JPL
638603	2016 CJ	—	December 24, 2005	Kitt Peak	Spacewatch	·	1.6 km	MPC · JPL
638604	2016 CC_{5}	—	March 3, 2006	Kitt Peak	Spacewatch	·	1.7 km	MPC · JPL
638605	2016 CN_{6}	—	March 9, 2011	Mount Lemmon	Mount Lemmon Survey	·	3.0 km	MPC · JPL
638606	2016 CO_{6}	—	February 21, 2007	Kitt Peak	Spacewatch	·	1.7 km	MPC · JPL
638607	2016 CT_{6}	—	January 12, 2011	Mount Lemmon	Mount Lemmon Survey	KOR	1.3 km	MPC · JPL
638608	2016 CV_{6}	—	April 11, 2007	Kitt Peak	Spacewatch	KOR	1.1 km	MPC · JPL
638609	2016 CD_{8}	—	July 15, 2013	Haleakala	Pan-STARRS 1	·	1.8 km	MPC · JPL
638610	2016 CD_{11}	—	January 27, 2007	Mount Lemmon	Mount Lemmon Survey	·	1.4 km	MPC · JPL
638611	2016 CE_{12}	—	February 25, 2011	Kitt Peak	Spacewatch	·	3.2 km	MPC · JPL
638612	2016 CY_{12}	—	March 8, 2005	Mount Lemmon	Mount Lemmon Survey	·	3.0 km	MPC · JPL
638613	2016 CE_{13}	—	January 28, 2011	Mount Lemmon	Mount Lemmon Survey	·	1.8 km	MPC · JPL
638614	2016 CO_{17}	—	August 20, 2009	Kitt Peak	Spacewatch	·	1.5 km	MPC · JPL
638615	2016 CD_{18}	—	January 26, 2000	Kitt Peak	Spacewatch	·	2.7 km	MPC · JPL
638616	2016 CP_{32}	—	November 1, 2008	Kitt Peak	Spacewatch	·	3.1 km	MPC · JPL
638617	2016 CF_{36}	—	February 3, 2016	Haleakala	Pan-STARRS 1	·	1.2 km	MPC · JPL
638618	2016 CR_{37}	—	January 8, 2016	Haleakala	Pan-STARRS 1	·	1.6 km	MPC · JPL
638619	2016 CL_{39}	—	July 1, 2013	Haleakala	Pan-STARRS 1	·	1.6 km	MPC · JPL
638620	2016 CV_{39}	—	January 11, 2000	Kitt Peak	Spacewatch	·	2.5 km	MPC · JPL
638621	2016 CM_{59}	—	September 30, 2008	Mount Lemmon	Mount Lemmon Survey	·	3.1 km	MPC · JPL
638622	2016 CD_{64}	—	September 19, 1998	Apache Point	SDSS	·	730 m	MPC · JPL
638623	2016 CL_{64}	—	September 22, 2014	Haleakala	Pan-STARRS 1	·	1.0 km	MPC · JPL
638624 Xueqikun	2016 CY_{66}	Xueqikun	September 11, 2007	XuYi	PMO NEO Survey Program	·	3.7 km	MPC · JPL
638625	2016 CR_{72}	—	January 17, 2004	Kitt Peak	Spacewatch	·	3.3 km	MPC · JPL
638626	2016 CF_{74}	—	August 31, 2014	Haleakala	Pan-STARRS 1	·	3.0 km	MPC · JPL
638627	2016 CY_{74}	—	April 12, 1996	Kitt Peak	Spacewatch	·	2.1 km	MPC · JPL
638628	2016 CX_{76}	—	April 19, 2012	Charleston	R. Holmes	·	1.3 km	MPC · JPL
638629	2016 CE_{78}	—	February 13, 2008	Kitt Peak	Spacewatch	·	970 m	MPC · JPL
638630	2016 CF_{78}	—	October 8, 1999	Kitt Peak	Spacewatch	·	1.5 km	MPC · JPL
638631	2016 CH_{81}	—	September 23, 2008	Kitt Peak	Spacewatch	·	3.0 km	MPC · JPL
638632	2016 CV_{81}	—	September 23, 2008	Mount Lemmon	Mount Lemmon Survey	·	2.1 km	MPC · JPL
638633	2016 CY_{81}	—	April 27, 2012	Haleakala	Pan-STARRS 1	·	1.7 km	MPC · JPL
638634	2016 CN_{83}	—	February 5, 2016	Haleakala	Pan-STARRS 1	·	1.8 km	MPC · JPL
638635	2016 CB_{87}	—	March 16, 2012	Kitt Peak	Spacewatch	·	1.4 km	MPC · JPL
638636	2016 CE_{87}	—	December 10, 2014	Mount Lemmon	Mount Lemmon Survey	·	1.6 km	MPC · JPL
638637	2016 CW_{89}	—	October 3, 2008	Mount Lemmon	Mount Lemmon Survey	EOS	1.7 km	MPC · JPL
638638	2016 CX_{90}	—	February 21, 2002	Kitt Peak	Spacewatch	·	1.0 km	MPC · JPL
638639	2016 CY_{94}	—	August 24, 2008	Kitt Peak	Spacewatch	·	2.3 km	MPC · JPL
638640	2016 CU_{96}	—	October 3, 2014	Mount Lemmon	Mount Lemmon Survey	·	1.9 km	MPC · JPL
638641	2016 CN_{98}	—	September 25, 2008	Kitt Peak	Spacewatch	VER	2.5 km	MPC · JPL
638642	2016 CQ_{101}	—	January 7, 2016	Haleakala	Pan-STARRS 1	·	2.1 km	MPC · JPL
638643	2016 CL_{107}	—	April 27, 2012	Haleakala	Pan-STARRS 1	·	2.1 km	MPC · JPL
638644	2016 CG_{115}	—	June 3, 2008	Mount Lemmon	Mount Lemmon Survey	·	1.8 km	MPC · JPL
638645	2016 CS_{115}	—	May 6, 2006	Mount Lemmon	Mount Lemmon Survey	·	2.5 km	MPC · JPL
638646	2016 CY_{116}	—	January 17, 2016	Haleakala	Pan-STARRS 1	·	1.5 km	MPC · JPL
638647	2016 CL_{118}	—	November 9, 2009	Kitt Peak	Spacewatch	·	1.6 km	MPC · JPL
638648	2016 CT_{118}	—	September 11, 2007	Catalina	CSS	·	3.5 km	MPC · JPL
638649	2016 CA_{119}	—	September 26, 2009	Kitt Peak	Spacewatch	·	1.5 km	MPC · JPL
638650	2016 CT_{120}	—	February 27, 2006	Mount Lemmon	Mount Lemmon Survey	·	1.6 km	MPC · JPL
638651	2016 CV_{121}	—	January 11, 2010	Kitt Peak	Spacewatch	·	3.1 km	MPC · JPL
638652	2016 CR_{128}	—	February 5, 2016	Haleakala	Pan-STARRS 1	·	1.2 km	MPC · JPL
638653	2016 CS_{130}	—	September 3, 2007	Catalina	CSS	·	4.4 km	MPC · JPL
638654	2016 CL_{131}	—	November 6, 2008	Mount Lemmon	Mount Lemmon Survey	VER	2.7 km	MPC · JPL
638655	2016 CE_{138}	—	January 15, 2005	Kitt Peak	Spacewatch	·	2.5 km	MPC · JPL
638656	2016 CJ_{142}	—	December 19, 2009	Kitt Peak	Spacewatch	·	4.0 km	MPC · JPL
638657	2016 CO_{144}	—	January 8, 2016	Haleakala	Pan-STARRS 1	·	1.5 km	MPC · JPL
638658	2016 CL_{148}	—	May 12, 2005	Mount Lemmon	Mount Lemmon Survey	·	1.2 km	MPC · JPL
638659	2016 CV_{149}	—	May 22, 2001	Cerro Tololo	Deep Ecliptic Survey	·	2.3 km	MPC · JPL
638660	2016 CP_{150}	—	September 27, 2009	Kitt Peak	Spacewatch	KOR	1.2 km	MPC · JPL
638661	2016 CR_{150}	—	September 25, 2009	Kitt Peak	Spacewatch	KOR	1.2 km	MPC · JPL
638662	2016 CK_{151}	—	October 25, 2005	Kitt Peak	Spacewatch	AST	1.4 km	MPC · JPL
638663	2016 CM_{152}	—	February 25, 2007	Kitt Peak	Spacewatch	·	1.6 km	MPC · JPL
638664	2016 CE_{153}	—	October 4, 1999	Kitt Peak	Spacewatch	KOR	1.2 km	MPC · JPL
638665	2016 CM_{154}	—	January 30, 2016	Mount Lemmon	Mount Lemmon Survey	·	1.1 km	MPC · JPL
638666	2016 CC_{156}	—	February 10, 2011	Mount Lemmon	Mount Lemmon Survey	KOR	1.1 km	MPC · JPL
638667	2016 CA_{162}	—	October 2, 2000	Kitt Peak	Spacewatch	AGN	1.2 km	MPC · JPL
638668	2016 CT_{163}	—	February 23, 2007	Mount Lemmon	Mount Lemmon Survey	AGN	1.1 km	MPC · JPL
638669	2016 CR_{164}	—	September 26, 2014	Cala d'Hort	I. de la Cueva, J. L. Ferrer	KOR	1.3 km	MPC · JPL
638670	2016 CY_{164}	—	December 25, 2005	Kitt Peak	Spacewatch	KOR	1.3 km	MPC · JPL
638671	2016 CC_{167}	—	November 22, 2009	Kitt Peak	Spacewatch	·	2.5 km	MPC · JPL
638672	2016 CP_{167}	—	May 21, 2006	Kitt Peak	Spacewatch	·	3.3 km	MPC · JPL
638673	2016 CV_{169}	—	August 22, 2004	Mauna Kea	Veillet, C.	AGN	920 m	MPC · JPL
638674	2016 CT_{172}	—	February 27, 2012	Haleakala	Pan-STARRS 1	·	1.9 km	MPC · JPL
638675	2016 CM_{173}	—	September 30, 2014	Mount Lemmon	Mount Lemmon Survey	HOF	2.1 km	MPC · JPL
638676 Žižek	2016 CJ_{185}	Žižek	September 1, 2014	Tincana	M. Kusiak, M. Żołnowski	·	1.2 km	MPC · JPL
638677	2016 CN_{189}	—	November 17, 2008	Kitt Peak	Spacewatch	·	2.7 km	MPC · JPL
638678	2016 CN_{190}	—	February 12, 2011	Mount Lemmon	Mount Lemmon Survey	·	2.7 km	MPC · JPL
638679	2016 CM_{191}	—	December 5, 2005	Kitt Peak	Spacewatch	KOR	1.3 km	MPC · JPL
638680	2016 CV_{194}	—	August 25, 2014	Haleakala	Pan-STARRS 1	H	510 m	MPC · JPL
638681	2016 CE_{200}	—	September 14, 2013	Mount Lemmon	Mount Lemmon Survey	·	2.8 km	MPC · JPL
638682	2016 CA_{203}	—	January 14, 2011	Mount Lemmon	Mount Lemmon Survey	·	1.5 km	MPC · JPL
638683	2016 CP_{203}	—	February 9, 2016	Haleakala	Pan-STARRS 1	·	1.6 km	MPC · JPL
638684	2016 CX_{204}	—	April 23, 2011	Haleakala	Pan-STARRS 1	THM	2.3 km	MPC · JPL
638685	2016 CO_{205}	—	January 11, 2002	Kitt Peak	Spacewatch	·	2.3 km	MPC · JPL
638686	2016 CZ_{210}	—	February 26, 2009	Kitt Peak	Spacewatch	·	930 m	MPC · JPL
638687	2016 CF_{214}	—	November 1, 2008	Mount Lemmon	Mount Lemmon Survey	·	610 m	MPC · JPL
638688	2016 CK_{219}	—	April 3, 2011	Črni Vrh	Skvarč, J.	·	3.7 km	MPC · JPL
638689	2016 CZ_{219}	—	September 28, 2006	Kitt Peak	Spacewatch	·	880 m	MPC · JPL
638690	2016 CP_{224}	—	November 17, 2014	Haleakala	Pan-STARRS 1	EOS	1.8 km	MPC · JPL
638691	2016 CV_{235}	—	February 10, 2016	Haleakala	Pan-STARRS 1	·	1.6 km	MPC · JPL
638692	2016 CC_{245}	—	April 28, 2012	Mount Lemmon	Mount Lemmon Survey	·	2.1 km	MPC · JPL
638693	2016 CF_{249}	—	October 23, 2009	Kitt Peak	Spacewatch	KOR	1.2 km	MPC · JPL
638694	2016 CO_{249}	—	September 13, 2013	Kitt Peak	Spacewatch	·	2.3 km	MPC · JPL
638695	2016 CT_{252}	—	May 3, 2008	Mount Lemmon	Mount Lemmon Survey	·	1.8 km	MPC · JPL
638696	2016 CX_{255}	—	April 5, 2005	Kitt Peak	Spacewatch	·	1.7 km	MPC · JPL
638697	2016 CG_{258}	—	November 10, 2009	Kitt Peak	Spacewatch	·	2.1 km	MPC · JPL
638698	2016 CF_{263}	—	February 12, 2016	Haleakala	Pan-STARRS 1	EOS	2.0 km	MPC · JPL
638699	2016 CZ_{277}	—	December 20, 2004	Mount Lemmon	Mount Lemmon Survey	·	2.6 km	MPC · JPL
638700	2016 CR_{278}	—	September 13, 2007	Mount Lemmon	Mount Lemmon Survey	·	2.4 km	MPC · JPL

== 638701–638800 ==
back to top

Designation			Discovery			Properties		Ref
Permanent	Provisional	Named after	Date	Site	Discoverer(s)	Category	Diam.	Ref
638701	2016 CP_{279}	—	April 27, 2012	Haleakala	Pan-STARRS 1	·	1.3 km	MPC · JPL
638702	2016 CR_{279}	—	February 8, 2011	Mount Lemmon	Mount Lemmon Survey	AGN	1 km	MPC · JPL
638703	2016 CY_{279}	—	November 20, 2014	Haleakala	Pan-STARRS 1	·	1.2 km	MPC · JPL
638704	2016 CF_{280}	—	October 28, 2014	Haleakala	Pan-STARRS 1	JUN	1.0 km	MPC · JPL
638705	2016 CM_{282}	—	October 3, 2013	Haleakala	Pan-STARRS 1	·	3.0 km	MPC · JPL
638706	2016 CO_{282}	—	September 12, 2007	Catalina	CSS	·	3.7 km	MPC · JPL
638707	2016 CT_{282}	—	May 23, 2006	Mount Lemmon	Mount Lemmon Survey	·	2.1 km	MPC · JPL
638708	2016 CV_{282}	—	November 22, 2014	Haleakala	Pan-STARRS 1	ARM	3.1 km	MPC · JPL
638709	2016 CJ_{283}	—	September 12, 2007	Mount Lemmon	Mount Lemmon Survey	·	2.6 km	MPC · JPL
638710	2016 CW_{283}	—	September 13, 2007	Mount Lemmon	Mount Lemmon Survey	HYG	2.5 km	MPC · JPL
638711	2016 CW_{289}	—	January 29, 2011	Mount Lemmon	Mount Lemmon Survey	·	1.5 km	MPC · JPL
638712	2016 CS_{293}	—	August 12, 2013	Haleakala	Pan-STARRS 1	·	1.5 km	MPC · JPL
638713	2016 CT_{294}	—	January 11, 2015	Haleakala	Pan-STARRS 1	·	1.9 km	MPC · JPL
638714	2016 CX_{295}	—	April 3, 2011	Haleakala	Pan-STARRS 1	·	2.4 km	MPC · JPL
638715	2016 CU_{299}	—	October 20, 2006	Kitt Peak	Spacewatch	·	960 m	MPC · JPL
638716	2016 CZ_{300}	—	July 26, 2001	Palomar	NEAT	·	3.3 km	MPC · JPL
638717	2016 CH_{304}	—	June 8, 2011	Mount Lemmon	Mount Lemmon Survey	·	2.5 km	MPC · JPL
638718	2016 CZ_{306}	—	February 6, 2016	Haleakala	Pan-STARRS 1	·	1.3 km	MPC · JPL
638719	2016 CA_{308}	—	September 11, 2007	Mount Lemmon	Mount Lemmon Survey	THM	2.2 km	MPC · JPL
638720	2016 CM_{308}	—	February 9, 2016	Haleakala	Pan-STARRS 1	KOR	1.3 km	MPC · JPL
638721	2016 CD_{309}	—	September 19, 1998	Apache Point	SDSS	·	1.4 km	MPC · JPL
638722	2016 CQ_{309}	—	January 8, 2010	Mount Lemmon	Mount Lemmon Survey	·	3.3 km	MPC · JPL
638723	2016 CM_{310}	—	October 25, 2014	Mount Lemmon	Mount Lemmon Survey	·	1.2 km	MPC · JPL
638724	2016 CO_{310}	—	July 13, 2013	Haleakala	Pan-STARRS 1	·	1.2 km	MPC · JPL
638725	2016 CY_{310}	—	November 17, 2014	Haleakala	Pan-STARRS 1	HOF	2.1 km	MPC · JPL
638726	2016 CF_{313}	—	April 12, 2011	Mount Lemmon	Mount Lemmon Survey	·	2.3 km	MPC · JPL
638727	2016 CK_{316}	—	February 11, 2016	Haleakala	Pan-STARRS 1	EOS	1.5 km	MPC · JPL
638728	2016 CB_{319}	—	February 11, 2016	Haleakala	Pan-STARRS 1	EOS	1.3 km	MPC · JPL
638729	2016 CG_{320}	—	December 21, 2014	Haleakala	Pan-STARRS 1	·	2.5 km	MPC · JPL
638730	2016 CJ_{337}	—	February 3, 2016	Haleakala	Pan-STARRS 1	·	1.6 km	MPC · JPL
638731	2016 CO_{337}	—	February 5, 2016	Haleakala	Pan-STARRS 1	·	1.3 km	MPC · JPL
638732	2016 CU_{337}	—	February 1, 2016	Haleakala	Pan-STARRS 1	KOR	1.1 km	MPC · JPL
638733	2016 CL_{340}	—	February 9, 2016	Haleakala	Pan-STARRS 1	·	1.6 km	MPC · JPL
638734	2016 CX_{350}	—	February 2, 2016	Haleakala	Pan-STARRS 1	·	1.4 km	MPC · JPL
638735	2016 CA_{351}	—	January 26, 2015	Haleakala	Pan-STARRS 1	·	2.3 km	MPC · JPL
638736	2016 CB_{351}	—	February 5, 2016	Haleakala	Pan-STARRS 1	AST	1.5 km	MPC · JPL
638737	2016 CT_{351}	—	February 5, 2016	Haleakala	Pan-STARRS 1	·	1.6 km	MPC · JPL
638738	2016 CY_{387}	—	February 11, 2016	Haleakala	Pan-STARRS 1	·	1.6 km	MPC · JPL
638739	2016 CS_{391}	—	February 5, 2016	Mount Lemmon	Mount Lemmon Survey	·	1.8 km	MPC · JPL
638740	2016 CJ_{411}	—	February 1, 2016	Haleakala	Pan-STARRS 1	KOR	1.0 km	MPC · JPL
638741	2016 DS	—	December 24, 2001	Palomar	NEAT	H	600 m	MPC · JPL
638742	2016 DH_{3}	—	October 22, 2009	Mount Lemmon	Mount Lemmon Survey	·	2.1 km	MPC · JPL
638743	2016 DB_{6}	—	March 6, 2003	Anderson Mesa	LONEOS	·	1.6 km	MPC · JPL
638744	2016 DY_{6}	—	March 16, 2007	Mount Lemmon	Mount Lemmon Survey	·	1.7 km	MPC · JPL
638745	2016 DU_{8}	—	September 23, 2008	Kitt Peak	Spacewatch	HYG	2.8 km	MPC · JPL
638746	2016 DA_{10}	—	August 17, 1999	Kitt Peak	Spacewatch	HOF	2.7 km	MPC · JPL
638747	2016 DD_{12}	—	September 14, 2007	Andrushivka	Y. Ivaščenko	·	3.7 km	MPC · JPL
638748	2016 DS_{12}	—	September 30, 2006	Kitt Peak	Spacewatch	·	750 m	MPC · JPL
638749	2016 DN_{13}	—	January 17, 2016	Haleakala	Pan-STARRS 1	·	1.4 km	MPC · JPL
638750	2016 DL_{14}	—	February 8, 2008	Kitt Peak	Spacewatch	·	890 m	MPC · JPL
638751	2016 DN_{14}	—	February 3, 2010	Sandlot	G. Hug	·	2.9 km	MPC · JPL
638752	2016 DT_{15}	—	January 8, 2016	Haleakala	Pan-STARRS 1	ADE	1.5 km	MPC · JPL
638753	2016 DX_{18}	—	April 2, 2000	Kitt Peak	Spacewatch	THM	2.5 km	MPC · JPL
638754	2016 DM_{19}	—	April 20, 2012	Mount Lemmon	Mount Lemmon Survey	·	1.8 km	MPC · JPL
638755	2016 DT_{22}	—	January 31, 2006	Kitt Peak	Spacewatch	·	1.9 km	MPC · JPL
638756	2016 DM_{27}	—	October 28, 2008	Kitt Peak	Spacewatch	·	3.0 km	MPC · JPL
638757	2016 DV_{32}	—	April 25, 2000	Kitt Peak	Spacewatch	THM	2.1 km	MPC · JPL
638758	2016 DK_{33}	—	October 20, 2007	Mount Lemmon	Mount Lemmon Survey	·	3.2 km	MPC · JPL
638759	2016 DJ_{40}	—	February 27, 2016	Mount Lemmon	Mount Lemmon Survey	·	1.7 km	MPC · JPL
638760	2016 EO_{3}	—	February 28, 2012	Haleakala	Pan-STARRS 1	·	1.4 km	MPC · JPL
638761	2016 EG_{5}	—	March 10, 2011	Kitt Peak	Spacewatch	·	2.3 km	MPC · JPL
638762	2016 EP_{7}	—	April 3, 2005	Palomar	NEAT	·	3.8 km	MPC · JPL
638763	2016 EU_{7}	—	July 14, 2013	Haleakala	Pan-STARRS 1	·	2.1 km	MPC · JPL
638764	2016 EN_{11}	—	November 17, 2014	Haleakala	Pan-STARRS 1	·	2.7 km	MPC · JPL
638765	2016 EY_{12}	—	November 27, 2014	Haleakala	Pan-STARRS 1	·	1.7 km	MPC · JPL
638766	2016 EH_{20}	—	October 15, 2007	Kitt Peak	Spacewatch	TIR	2.9 km	MPC · JPL
638767	2016 EE_{37}	—	May 28, 2012	Mount Lemmon	Mount Lemmon Survey	·	2.6 km	MPC · JPL
638768	2016 EL_{43}	—	November 26, 2014	Haleakala	Pan-STARRS 1	·	2.9 km	MPC · JPL
638769	2016 EE_{45}	—	November 12, 2006	Mount Lemmon	Mount Lemmon Survey	3:2	5.4 km	MPC · JPL
638770	2016 EW_{56}	—	February 23, 2011	Kitt Peak	Spacewatch	EOS	1.8 km	MPC · JPL
638771	2016 EM_{59}	—	September 26, 2000	Haleakala	NEAT	·	1.3 km	MPC · JPL
638772	2016 EU_{60}	—	July 18, 2007	Mount Lemmon	Mount Lemmon Survey	·	2.5 km	MPC · JPL
638773	2016 EE_{67}	—	September 9, 2007	Mount Lemmon	Mount Lemmon Survey	·	3.2 km	MPC · JPL
638774	2016 EW_{67}	—	February 4, 2005	Kitt Peak	Spacewatch	·	2.3 km	MPC · JPL
638775	2016 EJ_{70}	—	January 28, 2003	Kitt Peak	Spacewatch	·	1.7 km	MPC · JPL
638776	2016 ET_{74}	—	October 23, 2003	Apache Point	SDSS Collaboration	·	2.9 km	MPC · JPL
638777	2016 EV_{75}	—	March 6, 2011	Mount Lemmon	Mount Lemmon Survey	·	1.7 km	MPC · JPL
638778	2016 EY_{76}	—	October 28, 2008	Mount Lemmon	Mount Lemmon Survey	THM	1.9 km	MPC · JPL
638779	2016 EZ_{76}	—	May 24, 2006	Kitt Peak	Spacewatch	EOS	1.8 km	MPC · JPL
638780	2016 EO_{78}	—	September 9, 2007	Kitt Peak	Spacewatch	·	3.1 km	MPC · JPL
638781	2016 ET_{78}	—	October 11, 2001	Palomar	NEAT	·	3.6 km	MPC · JPL
638782	2016 EM_{80}	—	October 30, 2008	Mount Bigelow	CSS	·	3.9 km	MPC · JPL
638783	2016 EP_{80}	—	December 25, 2003	Apache Point	SDSS Collaboration	·	2.0 km	MPC · JPL
638784	2016 EX_{86}	—	April 2, 2011	Kitt Peak	Spacewatch	·	3.2 km	MPC · JPL
638785	2016 EA_{87}	—	March 10, 2005	Moletai	K. Černis, Zdanavicius, J.	·	2.9 km	MPC · JPL
638786	2016 ES_{104}	—	April 27, 2012	Haleakala	Pan-STARRS 1	·	1.5 km	MPC · JPL
638787	2016 EZ_{105}	—	March 7, 2016	Haleakala	Pan-STARRS 1	·	3.3 km	MPC · JPL
638788	2016 ED_{111}	—	March 27, 2003	Kitt Peak	Spacewatch	ADE	1.8 km	MPC · JPL
638789	2016 EC_{112}	—	October 23, 2003	Apache Point	SDSS Collaboration	EOS	1.5 km	MPC · JPL
638790	2016 ER_{112}	—	March 14, 2005	Mount Lemmon	Mount Lemmon Survey	·	3.3 km	MPC · JPL
638791	2016 EU_{113}	—	October 16, 2003	Palomar	NEAT	EOS	1.7 km	MPC · JPL
638792	2016 ER_{115}	—	February 14, 2010	Mount Lemmon	Mount Lemmon Survey	·	2.5 km	MPC · JPL
638793	2016 EB_{118}	—	September 23, 2008	Mount Lemmon	Mount Lemmon Survey	·	2.3 km	MPC · JPL
638794	2016 EE_{118}	—	August 29, 2006	Kitt Peak	Spacewatch	·	3.7 km	MPC · JPL
638795	2016 ET_{119}	—	February 5, 2016	Haleakala	Pan-STARRS 1	KOR	1.1 km	MPC · JPL
638796	2016 EU_{120}	—	February 5, 2016	Haleakala	Pan-STARRS 1	EOS	1.8 km	MPC · JPL
638797	2016 EL_{121}	—	March 14, 2007	Mount Lemmon	Mount Lemmon Survey	HOF	2.2 km	MPC · JPL
638798	2016 ER_{121}	—	August 12, 2013	Haleakala	Pan-STARRS 1	·	1.5 km	MPC · JPL
638799	2016 EB_{122}	—	March 13, 2011	Mount Lemmon	Mount Lemmon Survey	HYG	2.8 km	MPC · JPL
638800	2016 EH_{125}	—	October 21, 2008	Kitt Peak	Spacewatch	·	2.5 km	MPC · JPL

== 638801–638900 ==
back to top

Designation			Discovery			Properties		Ref
Permanent	Provisional	Named after	Date	Site	Discoverer(s)	Category	Diam.	Ref
638801	2016 EL_{128}	—	February 25, 2011	Mount Lemmon	Mount Lemmon Survey	KOR	1.3 km	MPC · JPL
638802	2016 EA_{135}	—	November 30, 2008	Mount Lemmon	Mount Lemmon Survey	·	2.5 km	MPC · JPL
638803	2016 EL_{135}	—	May 9, 2011	Mount Lemmon	Mount Lemmon Survey	·	2.1 km	MPC · JPL
638804	2016 EY_{136}	—	November 2, 2007	Mount Lemmon	Mount Lemmon Survey	NYS	830 m	MPC · JPL
638805	2016 EO_{141}	—	January 25, 2006	Kitt Peak	Spacewatch	KOR	1.1 km	MPC · JPL
638806	2016 EG_{142}	—	October 17, 2006	Mount Lemmon	Mount Lemmon Survey	·	1.3 km	MPC · JPL
638807	2016 ET_{143}	—	October 23, 2013	Mount Lemmon	Mount Lemmon Survey	·	1.5 km	MPC · JPL
638808	2016 EH_{145}	—	November 10, 2013	Mount Lemmon	Mount Lemmon Survey	·	2.5 km	MPC · JPL
638809	2016 EQ_{146}	—	October 3, 2013	Haleakala	Pan-STARRS 1	·	2.3 km	MPC · JPL
638810	2016 ES_{146}	—	March 5, 2010	Kitt Peak	Spacewatch	THM	2.3 km	MPC · JPL
638811	2016 EM_{148}	—	April 22, 2011	Kitt Peak	Spacewatch	EOS	1.7 km	MPC · JPL
638812	2016 EU_{152}	—	October 8, 2012	Haleakala	Pan-STARRS 1	·	3.0 km	MPC · JPL
638813	2016 EG_{164}	—	November 3, 2008	Mount Lemmon	Mount Lemmon Survey	(43176)	3.0 km	MPC · JPL
638814	2016 EE_{169}	—	September 17, 1995	Kitt Peak	Spacewatch	·	2.8 km	MPC · JPL
638815	2016 EB_{176}	—	March 16, 2005	Mount Lemmon	Mount Lemmon Survey	·	2.3 km	MPC · JPL
638816	2016 EM_{179}	—	March 12, 2016	Haleakala	Pan-STARRS 1	·	2.3 km	MPC · JPL
638817	2016 EE_{185}	—	April 21, 2011	Haleakala	Pan-STARRS 1	EOS	1.6 km	MPC · JPL
638818	2016 EY_{185}	—	December 2, 2010	Kitt Peak	Spacewatch	·	1.3 km	MPC · JPL
638819	2016 EN_{186}	—	October 21, 2006	Kitt Peak	Spacewatch	(5)	850 m	MPC · JPL
638820	2016 EU_{189}	—	April 1, 2011	Mount Lemmon	Mount Lemmon Survey	·	1.8 km	MPC · JPL
638821	2016 EH_{191}	—	June 18, 2013	Haleakala	Pan-STARRS 1	·	1.6 km	MPC · JPL
638822	2016 EO_{191}	—	August 6, 2005	Palomar	NEAT	·	1.7 km	MPC · JPL
638823	2016 EQ_{191}	—	September 7, 2008	Mount Lemmon	Mount Lemmon Survey	·	2.1 km	MPC · JPL
638824	2016 EA_{194}	—	December 21, 2015	Mount Lemmon	Mount Lemmon Survey	·	2.6 km	MPC · JPL
638825	2016 EK_{201}	—	September 29, 2008	Kitt Peak	Spacewatch	·	1.7 km	MPC · JPL
638826	2016 ES_{219}	—	March 2, 2011	Kitt Peak	Spacewatch	·	2.2 km	MPC · JPL
638827	2016 EM_{221}	—	August 24, 2007	Kitt Peak	Spacewatch	·	2.0 km	MPC · JPL
638828	2016 ES_{221}	—	March 14, 2016	Mount Lemmon	Mount Lemmon Survey	EOS	1.5 km	MPC · JPL
638829	2016 EX_{221}	—	March 5, 2006	Mount Lemmon	Mount Lemmon Survey	KOR	1.3 km	MPC · JPL
638830	2016 EH_{224}	—	January 16, 2015	Haleakala	Pan-STARRS 1	EOS	1.3 km	MPC · JPL
638831	2016 EV_{226}	—	May 13, 2007	Kitt Peak	Spacewatch	·	2.5 km	MPC · JPL
638832	2016 EZ_{226}	—	September 20, 2006	Kitt Peak	Spacewatch	·	3.0 km	MPC · JPL
638833	2016 ED_{227}	—	October 11, 2007	Mount Lemmon	Mount Lemmon Survey	EOS	1.6 km	MPC · JPL
638834	2016 EK_{227}	—	March 13, 2016	Haleakala	Pan-STARRS 1	·	1.3 km	MPC · JPL
638835	2016 EO_{227}	—	August 14, 2012	Haleakala	Pan-STARRS 1	·	2.0 km	MPC · JPL
638836	2016 ER_{228}	—	March 8, 2016	Haleakala	Pan-STARRS 1	·	2.1 km	MPC · JPL
638837	2016 EY_{230}	—	August 23, 2001	Kitt Peak	Spacewatch	·	2.6 km	MPC · JPL
638838	2016 ET_{232}	—	September 14, 2013	Mount Lemmon	Mount Lemmon Survey	·	1.5 km	MPC · JPL
638839	2016 EZ_{236}	—	September 1, 2013	Haleakala	Pan-STARRS 1	KOR	1.1 km	MPC · JPL
638840	2016 EY_{237}	—	November 24, 2003	Kitt Peak	Deep Ecliptic Survey	·	1.2 km	MPC · JPL
638841	2016 EJ_{240}	—	September 14, 2013	Haleakala	Pan-STARRS 1	·	1.6 km	MPC · JPL
638842	2016 EO_{240}	—	March 10, 2016	Mount Lemmon	Mount Lemmon Survey	KOR	1.2 km	MPC · JPL
638843	2016 ET_{246}	—	March 20, 2002	Kitt Peak	Deep Ecliptic Survey	·	1.5 km	MPC · JPL
638844	2016 EY_{262}	—	March 1, 2016	Haleakala	Pan-STARRS 1	·	2.6 km	MPC · JPL
638845	2016 EA_{265}	—	March 5, 2016	Haleakala	Pan-STARRS 1	·	3.1 km	MPC · JPL
638846	2016 EG_{272}	—	March 1, 2016	Mount Lemmon	Mount Lemmon Survey	·	1.3 km	MPC · JPL
638847	2016 EB_{275}	—	March 4, 2016	Haleakala	Pan-STARRS 1	·	2.0 km	MPC · JPL
638848	2016 EJ_{279}	—	March 4, 2016	Haleakala	Pan-STARRS 1	·	1.4 km	MPC · JPL
638849	2016 EU_{279}	—	March 15, 2016	Haleakala	Pan-STARRS 1	·	540 m	MPC · JPL
638850	2016 EP_{294}	—	March 10, 2016	Haleakala	Pan-STARRS 1	·	1.4 km	MPC · JPL
638851	2016 EU_{294}	—	March 4, 2016	Haleakala	Pan-STARRS 1	·	2.2 km	MPC · JPL
638852	2016 EP_{300}	—	March 1, 2016	Mount Lemmon	Mount Lemmon Survey	·	1.5 km	MPC · JPL
638853	2016 EJ_{310}	—	March 7, 2016	Haleakala	Pan-STARRS 1	EOS	1.7 km	MPC · JPL
638854	2016 ER_{316}	—	March 13, 2016	Haleakala	Pan-STARRS 1	·	2.3 km	MPC · JPL
638855	2016 FT_{1}	—	March 11, 2016	Haleakala	Pan-STARRS 1	·	1.7 km	MPC · JPL
638856	2016 FL_{7}	—	June 18, 2013	Haleakala	Pan-STARRS 1	BRG	1.6 km	MPC · JPL
638857	2016 FE_{8}	—	March 11, 2005	Kitt Peak	Deep Ecliptic Survey	THM	2.6 km	MPC · JPL
638858	2016 FJ_{8}	—	November 11, 2006	Catalina	CSS	(5)	1.3 km	MPC · JPL
638859	2016 FK_{8}	—	May 5, 2008	Kitt Peak	Spacewatch	·	1.1 km	MPC · JPL
638860	2016 FQ_{8}	—	October 11, 2002	Kitt Peak	Spacewatch	PHO	1.0 km	MPC · JPL
638861	2016 FA_{9}	—	April 14, 2013	ESA OGS	ESA OGS	·	700 m	MPC · JPL
638862	2016 FD_{10}	—	August 18, 2006	Kitt Peak	Spacewatch	MAS	650 m	MPC · JPL
638863	2016 FO_{10}	—	October 11, 1996	Kitt Peak	Spacewatch	·	3.0 km	MPC · JPL
638864	2016 FO_{15}	—	April 27, 2011	Haleakala	Pan-STARRS 1	·	1.4 km	MPC · JPL
638865	2016 FA_{21}	—	December 26, 2005	Mount Lemmon	Mount Lemmon Survey	·	1.8 km	MPC · JPL
638866	2016 FN_{26}	—	October 9, 2008	Mount Lemmon	Mount Lemmon Survey	KOR	1.0 km	MPC · JPL
638867	2016 FE_{28}	—	September 5, 2000	Kitt Peak	Spacewatch	·	2.5 km	MPC · JPL
638868	2016 FJ_{28}	—	February 10, 2010	Kitt Peak	Spacewatch	·	2.2 km	MPC · JPL
638869	2016 FF_{34}	—	September 11, 2007	Kitt Peak	Spacewatch	·	2.4 km	MPC · JPL
638870	2016 FV_{34}	—	March 4, 2016	Haleakala	Pan-STARRS 1	HOF	1.9 km	MPC · JPL
638871	2016 FO_{44}	—	March 4, 2006	Kitt Peak	Spacewatch	·	1.5 km	MPC · JPL
638872	2016 FK_{45}	—	October 9, 2007	Kitt Peak	Spacewatch	·	2.8 km	MPC · JPL
638873	2016 FC_{47}	—	March 4, 2016	Haleakala	Pan-STARRS 1	HOF	2.0 km	MPC · JPL
638874	2016 FT_{47}	—	March 14, 2010	Mount Lemmon	Mount Lemmon Survey	·	2.4 km	MPC · JPL
638875	2016 FX_{51}	—	August 26, 2012	Haleakala	Pan-STARRS 1	·	2.4 km	MPC · JPL
638876	2016 FT_{62}	—	February 25, 2006	Mount Lemmon	Mount Lemmon Survey	KOR	1.1 km	MPC · JPL
638877	2016 FB_{63}	—	October 23, 2001	Anderson Mesa	LONEOS	·	2.0 km	MPC · JPL
638878	2016 FM_{73}	—	March 28, 2016	Mount Lemmon	Mount Lemmon Survey	·	490 m	MPC · JPL
638879	2016 FT_{81}	—	March 28, 2016	Mount Lemmon	Mount Lemmon Survey	·	1.2 km	MPC · JPL
638880	2016 FG_{156}	—	May 8, 2011	Mount Lemmon	Mount Lemmon Survey	·	2.1 km	MPC · JPL
638881	2016 GP_{3}	—	November 1, 2005	Mount Lemmon	Mount Lemmon Survey	·	2.0 km	MPC · JPL
638882	2016 GV_{6}	—	October 5, 2002	Palomar	NEAT	·	2.9 km	MPC · JPL
638883	2016 GX_{6}	—	May 7, 2006	Mount Lemmon	Mount Lemmon Survey	·	2.3 km	MPC · JPL
638884	2016 GK_{9}	—	January 13, 2015	Haleakala	Pan-STARRS 1	KOR	1.1 km	MPC · JPL
638885	2016 GA_{10}	—	January 13, 2015	Haleakala	Pan-STARRS 1	·	2.5 km	MPC · JPL
638886	2016 GU_{13}	—	March 4, 2010	Kitt Peak	Spacewatch	·	2.7 km	MPC · JPL
638887	2016 GM_{17}	—	May 23, 2006	Kitt Peak	Spacewatch	·	2.6 km	MPC · JPL
638888	2016 GQ_{18}	—	September 3, 2013	Haleakala	Pan-STARRS 1	·	1.6 km	MPC · JPL
638889	2016 GO_{20}	—	March 10, 2016	Haleakala	Pan-STARRS 1	KOR	950 m	MPC · JPL
638890	2016 GT_{27}	—	September 16, 2009	Kitt Peak	Spacewatch	·	1.9 km	MPC · JPL
638891	2016 GB_{31}	—	September 2, 2008	Kitt Peak	Spacewatch	KOR	1.3 km	MPC · JPL
638892	2016 GC_{31}	—	March 9, 2005	Mount Lemmon	Mount Lemmon Survey	·	2.7 km	MPC · JPL
638893	2016 GX_{40}	—	September 9, 2007	Mount Lemmon	Mount Lemmon Survey	THM	1.9 km	MPC · JPL
638894	2016 GA_{58}	—	January 6, 2010	Kitt Peak	Spacewatch	·	2.0 km	MPC · JPL
638895	2016 GR_{59}	—	April 5, 2005	Mount Lemmon	Mount Lemmon Survey	·	2.7 km	MPC · JPL
638896	2016 GX_{66}	—	September 30, 2003	Kitt Peak	Spacewatch	·	2.3 km	MPC · JPL
638897	2016 GS_{68}	—	October 30, 2007	Mount Lemmon	Mount Lemmon Survey	·	2.8 km	MPC · JPL
638898	2016 GV_{77}	—	January 26, 2007	Kitt Peak	Spacewatch	3:2	5.0 km	MPC · JPL
638899	2016 GY_{86}	—	March 2, 2011	Mount Lemmon	Mount Lemmon Survey	·	1.8 km	MPC · JPL
638900	2016 GL_{91}	—	February 8, 2011	Mount Lemmon	Mount Lemmon Survey	·	1.3 km	MPC · JPL

== 638901–639000 ==
back to top

Designation			Discovery			Properties		Ref
Permanent	Provisional	Named after	Date	Site	Discoverer(s)	Category	Diam.	Ref
638901	2016 GZ_{98}	—	September 5, 2000	Apache Point	SDSS Collaboration	·	1.7 km	MPC · JPL
638902	2016 GG_{99}	—	October 19, 2007	Catalina	CSS	·	2.4 km	MPC · JPL
638903	2016 GS_{100}	—	September 19, 1998	Apache Point	SDSS	·	1.4 km	MPC · JPL
638904	2016 GK_{104}	—	April 9, 2002	Palomar	NEAT	·	940 m	MPC · JPL
638905	2016 GY_{111}	—	November 5, 2007	Kitt Peak	Spacewatch	·	630 m	MPC · JPL
638906	2016 GS_{112}	—	October 2, 2003	Kitt Peak	Spacewatch	·	880 m	MPC · JPL
638907	2016 GM_{116}	—	October 1, 2013	Mount Lemmon	Mount Lemmon Survey	·	1.5 km	MPC · JPL
638908	2016 GM_{121}	—	April 1, 2016	Haleakala	Pan-STARRS 1	·	1.8 km	MPC · JPL
638909	2016 GK_{124}	—	April 1, 2016	Haleakala	Pan-STARRS 1	·	2.5 km	MPC · JPL
638910	2016 GR_{126}	—	October 18, 2009	Mount Lemmon	Mount Lemmon Survey	·	1.6 km	MPC · JPL
638911	2016 GP_{129}	—	August 30, 2006	Anderson Mesa	LONEOS	·	2.8 km	MPC · JPL
638912	2016 GL_{133}	—	January 17, 2016	Haleakala	Pan-STARRS 1	·	2.0 km	MPC · JPL
638913	2016 GD_{138}	—	January 17, 2015	Mount Lemmon	Mount Lemmon Survey	·	1.7 km	MPC · JPL
638914	2016 GS_{142}	—	October 22, 2008	Kitt Peak	Spacewatch	EOS	2.3 km	MPC · JPL
638915	2016 GQ_{147}	—	September 11, 2007	Kitt Peak	Spacewatch	·	560 m	MPC · JPL
638916	2016 GU_{150}	—	April 12, 2005	Kitt Peak	Spacewatch	·	1.3 km	MPC · JPL
638917	2016 GZ_{152}	—	May 8, 2005	Mount Lemmon	Mount Lemmon Survey	THM	2.9 km	MPC · JPL
638918	2016 GS_{157}	—	March 13, 2011	Kitt Peak	Spacewatch	EOS	1.9 km	MPC · JPL
638919	2016 GG_{158}	—	February 15, 2010	Mount Lemmon	Mount Lemmon Survey	·	2.4 km	MPC · JPL
638920	2016 GV_{167}	—	October 29, 2003	Kitt Peak	Spacewatch	·	1.0 km	MPC · JPL
638921	2016 GN_{168}	—	April 3, 2016	Haleakala	Pan-STARRS 1	·	2.0 km	MPC · JPL
638922	2016 GG_{174}	—	March 31, 2016	Haleakala	Pan-STARRS 1	·	1.3 km	MPC · JPL
638923	2016 GV_{178}	—	October 26, 2011	Haleakala	Pan-STARRS 1	L4	7.5 km	MPC · JPL
638924	2016 GO_{186}	—	November 9, 2009	Catalina	CSS	·	2.6 km	MPC · JPL
638925	2016 GV_{188}	—	April 13, 2005	Catalina	CSS	V	920 m	MPC · JPL
638926	2016 GL_{191}	—	October 2, 2010	Mount Lemmon	Mount Lemmon Survey	·	670 m	MPC · JPL
638927	2016 GS_{192}	—	April 3, 2016	Haleakala	Pan-STARRS 1	·	660 m	MPC · JPL
638928	2016 GH_{201}	—	March 30, 2016	Haleakala	Pan-STARRS 1	EOS	1.5 km	MPC · JPL
638929	2016 GO_{224}	—	January 18, 2015	Mount Lemmon	Mount Lemmon Survey	·	2.0 km	MPC · JPL
638930	2016 GS_{224}	—	March 12, 2016	Haleakala	Pan-STARRS 1	·	1.6 km	MPC · JPL
638931	2016 GH_{226}	—	September 20, 2001	Kitt Peak	Spacewatch	·	2.4 km	MPC · JPL
638932	2016 GZ_{227}	—	April 3, 2016	Haleakala	Pan-STARRS 1	·	1.5 km	MPC · JPL
638933	2016 GD_{229}	—	March 31, 2016	Catalina	CSS	·	1.0 km	MPC · JPL
638934	2016 GR_{229}	—	May 10, 2005	Kitt Peak	Spacewatch	LIX	3.0 km	MPC · JPL
638935	2016 GV_{232}	—	November 18, 2007	Mount Lemmon	Mount Lemmon Survey	V	570 m	MPC · JPL
638936	2016 GY_{236}	—	September 27, 2009	Mount Lemmon	Mount Lemmon Survey	L4	9.5 km	MPC · JPL
638937	2016 GC_{237}	—	May 10, 2005	Kitt Peak	Spacewatch	·	2.4 km	MPC · JPL
638938	2016 GW_{244}	—	August 26, 2012	Haleakala	Pan-STARRS 1	·	2.6 km	MPC · JPL
638939	2016 GO_{245}	—	April 4, 2005	Mount Lemmon	Mount Lemmon Survey	·	2.6 km	MPC · JPL
638940	2016 GB_{246}	—	December 25, 2003	Kitt Peak	Spacewatch	HYG	2.6 km	MPC · JPL
638941	2016 GE_{247}	—	February 9, 2005	Anderson Mesa	LONEOS	·	870 m	MPC · JPL
638942	2016 GV_{247}	—	April 8, 2002	Palomar	NEAT	·	2.6 km	MPC · JPL
638943	2016 GC_{251}	—	May 25, 2006	Mauna Kea	P. A. Wiegert	·	1.7 km	MPC · JPL
638944	2016 GV_{252}	—	April 4, 2016	Mount Lemmon	Mount Lemmon Survey	L4	8.4 km	MPC · JPL
638945	2016 GH_{278}	—	April 2, 2016	Haleakala	Pan-STARRS 1	AGN	1.0 km	MPC · JPL
638946	2016 GJ_{278}	—	April 2, 2016	Haleakala	Pan-STARRS 1	AGN	820 m	MPC · JPL
638947	2016 GM_{286}	—	April 1, 2016	Haleakala	Pan-STARRS 1	EOS	1.8 km	MPC · JPL
638948	2016 GX_{289}	—	April 3, 2016	Mount Lemmon	Mount Lemmon Survey	EOS	1.5 km	MPC · JPL
638949	2016 GX_{291}	—	November 20, 2009	Kitt Peak	Spacewatch	HOF	2.1 km	MPC · JPL
638950	2016 GZ_{295}	—	April 3, 2016	Haleakala	Pan-STARRS 1	·	1.5 km	MPC · JPL
638951	2016 GC_{298}	—	April 12, 2016	Haleakala	Pan-STARRS 1	·	1.7 km	MPC · JPL
638952	2016 GQ_{298}	—	April 1, 2016	Mount Lemmon	Mount Lemmon Survey	KOR	1.0 km	MPC · JPL
638953	2016 GD_{299}	—	April 3, 2016	Mount Lemmon	Mount Lemmon Survey	·	1.5 km	MPC · JPL
638954	2016 GV_{316}	—	October 8, 2012	Haleakala	Pan-STARRS 1	·	3.0 km	MPC · JPL
638955	2016 GN_{359}	—	April 2, 2016	Haleakala	Pan-STARRS 1	·	1.6 km	MPC · JPL
638956	2016 HG_{5}	—	October 26, 1995	Kitt Peak	Spacewatch	GEF	1.3 km	MPC · JPL
638957	2016 HX_{5}	—	June 17, 2005	Mount Lemmon	Mount Lemmon Survey	·	1.5 km	MPC · JPL
638958	2016 HC_{7}	—	October 23, 2003	Kitt Peak	Spacewatch	·	920 m	MPC · JPL
638959	2016 HN_{11}	—	April 30, 2016	Haleakala	Pan-STARRS 1	EMA	2.1 km	MPC · JPL
638960	2016 HU_{11}	—	March 8, 2003	Kitt Peak	Spacewatch	·	550 m	MPC · JPL
638961	2016 HE_{15}	—	February 11, 2004	Palomar	NEAT	·	1.2 km	MPC · JPL
638962	2016 HX_{16}	—	July 6, 2013	Haleakala	Pan-STARRS 1	·	660 m	MPC · JPL
638963	2016 HD_{17}	—	March 6, 2011	Kitt Peak	Spacewatch	·	1.6 km	MPC · JPL
638964	2016 HZ_{19}	—	May 27, 2011	Nogales	M. Schwartz, P. R. Holvorcem	·	3.4 km	MPC · JPL
638965	2016 HJ_{30}	—	April 16, 2016	Haleakala	Pan-STARRS 1	·	2.8 km	MPC · JPL
638966	2016 HJ_{32}	—	April 27, 2016	Haleakala	Pan-STARRS 1	EOS	1.5 km	MPC · JPL
638967	2016 HC_{33}	—	April 30, 2016	Haleakala	Pan-STARRS 1	·	2.7 km	MPC · JPL
638968	2016 JZ_{1}	—	July 25, 2006	Palomar	NEAT	V	730 m	MPC · JPL
638969	2016 JT_{4}	—	February 16, 2015	Haleakala	Pan-STARRS 1	·	2.7 km	MPC · JPL
638970	2016 JA_{8}	—	October 26, 2011	Haleakala	Pan-STARRS 1	L4	8.0 km	MPC · JPL
638971	2016 JH_{8}	—	March 11, 2011	Kitt Peak	Spacewatch	GEF	1.2 km	MPC · JPL
638972	2016 JS_{9}	—	March 10, 2005	Anderson Mesa	LONEOS	·	1.4 km	MPC · JPL
638973	2016 JX_{9}	—	October 7, 2007	Catalina	CSS	·	710 m	MPC · JPL
638974	2016 JG_{23}	—	April 13, 2002	Kitt Peak	Spacewatch	AST	1.6 km	MPC · JPL
638975	2016 JL_{23}	—	November 12, 2007	Mount Lemmon	Mount Lemmon Survey	·	2.6 km	MPC · JPL
638976	2016 JD_{28}	—	October 6, 2008	Kitt Peak	Spacewatch	·	1.7 km	MPC · JPL
638977	2016 JU_{29}	—	August 9, 2000	Kitt Peak	Spacewatch	·	1.5 km	MPC · JPL
638978	2016 JJ_{30}	—	November 10, 2009	Kitt Peak	Spacewatch	·	2.6 km	MPC · JPL
638979	2016 JB_{32}	—	October 4, 2004	Kitt Peak	Spacewatch	·	1.4 km	MPC · JPL
638980	2016 JM_{32}	—	May 20, 2005	Mount Lemmon	Mount Lemmon Survey	V	890 m	MPC · JPL
638981	2016 JE_{37}	—	April 2, 2016	Haleakala	Pan-STARRS 1	·	2.0 km	MPC · JPL
638982	2016 JD_{42}	—	May 13, 2016	Haleakala	Pan-STARRS 1	·	2.7 km	MPC · JPL
638983	2016 JT_{48}	—	May 2, 2016	Haleakala	Pan-STARRS 1	·	2.5 km	MPC · JPL
638984	2016 JW_{49}	—	January 18, 2015	Kitt Peak	Spacewatch	·	3.0 km	MPC · JPL
638985	2016 JQ_{64}	—	May 1, 2016	Haleakala	Pan-STARRS 1	ELF	2.6 km	MPC · JPL
638986	2016 JQ_{67}	—	January 16, 2015	Haleakala	Pan-STARRS 1	·	1.4 km	MPC · JPL
638987	2016 KK_{2}	—	April 1, 2003	Apache Point	SDSS	EUN	1.4 km	MPC · JPL
638988	2016 KG_{5}	—	February 16, 2015	Haleakala	Pan-STARRS 1	·	1.6 km	MPC · JPL
638989	2016 KM_{11}	—	May 30, 2016	Haleakala	Pan-STARRS 1	EOS	1.4 km	MPC · JPL
638990	2016 LK_{5}	—	January 9, 1994	Kitt Peak	Spacewatch	·	5.6 km	MPC · JPL
638991	2016 LV_{13}	—	January 28, 2011	Mount Lemmon	Mount Lemmon Survey	·	1.8 km	MPC · JPL
638992	2016 LW_{13}	—	September 22, 2012	Kitt Peak	Spacewatch	·	1.6 km	MPC · JPL
638993	2016 LU_{22}	—	March 4, 2008	Mount Lemmon	Mount Lemmon Survey	V	570 m	MPC · JPL
638994	2016 LJ_{24}	—	March 22, 2015	Haleakala	Pan-STARRS 1	L4	9.6 km	MPC · JPL
638995	2016 LQ_{25}	—	January 7, 2006	Mount Lemmon	Mount Lemmon Survey	·	570 m	MPC · JPL
638996	2016 LW_{31}	—	October 16, 2003	Kitt Peak	Spacewatch	V	660 m	MPC · JPL
638997	2016 LM_{33}	—	August 1, 2000	Socorro	LINEAR	·	1.2 km	MPC · JPL
638998	2016 LC_{35}	—	July 20, 2013	Haleakala	Pan-STARRS 1	·	1.1 km	MPC · JPL
638999	2016 LE_{38}	—	February 24, 2012	Kitt Peak	Spacewatch	V	620 m	MPC · JPL
639000	2016 LL_{58}	—	December 12, 2012	Mount Lemmon	Mount Lemmon Survey	VER	2.6 km	MPC · JPL

back to top

== Meaning of names ==
As minor planet discoveries are confirmed, they are given a permanent number by the IAU's Minor Planet Center (MPC), and the discoverers can then submit names for them, following the IAU's naming conventions. The list below concerns those minor planets in the specified number-range that have received names, and explains the meanings of those names.

Official naming citations of newly named small Solar System bodies are approved and published in a bulletin by IAU's Working Group for Small Bodies Nomenclature (WGSBN). Before May 2021, citations were published in MPC's Minor Planet Circulars for many decades. Recent citations can also be found on the JPL Small-Body Database (SBDB). Until his death in 2016, German astronomer Lutz D. Schmadel compiled these citations into the Dictionary of Minor Planet Names (DMP) and regularly updated the collection.

Based on Paul Herget's The Names of the Minor Planets, Schmadel also researched the unclear origin of numerous asteroids, most of which had been named prior to World War II. This article incorporates text from this source, which is in the public domain: SBDB New namings may only be added to this list below after official publication as the preannouncement of names is condemned. The WGSBN publishes a comprehensive guideline for the naming rules of non-cometary small Solar System bodies.

Named minor planet	Provisional	This minor planet was named for...	Ref · Catalog
638624 Xueqikun	2016 CY_{66}	Xue Qikun (b. 1962), an academician of Chinese Academy of Sciences.	IAU · 638624
638676 Žižek	2016 CJ_{185}	Slavoj Žižek (b. 1949), a Slovenian philosopher.	IAU · 638676
