= List of minor planets: 745001–746000 =

The following is a partial list of minor planets, running from minor-planet number 745001 through 746000, inclusive. The primary data for this and other partial lists is based on JPL's "Small-Body Orbital Elements" and data available from the Minor Planet Center. Critical list information is also provided by the MPC, unless otherwise specified from Lowell Observatory. A detailed description of the table's columns and additional sources are given on the main page including a complete list of every page in this series, and a statistical break-up on the dynamical classification of minor planets.

Also see the summary list of all named bodies in numerical and alphabetical order, and the corresponding naming citations for the number range of this particular list. New namings may only be added to this list after official publication, as the preannouncement of names is condemned by the Working Group for Small Bodies Nomenclature of the International Astronomical Union.

Near-Earth obj.	MBA (inner)	MBA (outer)	Centaur
Mars-crosser	MBA (middle)	Jupiter trojan	Trans-Neptunian obj.
Unclassified

== 745001–745100 ==
Designation			Discovery			Properties		Ref
Permanent	Provisional	Named after	Date	Site	Discoverer(s)	Category	Diam.	Ref
745001	2010 JH_{211}	—	January 17, 2013	Haleakala	Pan-STARRS 1	·	550 m	MPC · JPL
745002	2010 JN_{211}	—	March 13, 2014	Mount Lemmon	Mount Lemmon Survey	·	1.4 km	MPC · JPL
745003	2010 JB_{212}	—	October 13, 2015	Kitt Peak	Spacewatch	·	930 m	MPC · JPL
745004	2010 JF_{213}	—	October 8, 2012	Mount Lemmon	Mount Lemmon Survey	VER	2.1 km	MPC · JPL
745005	2010 JE_{214}	—	September 12, 2015	Haleakala	Pan-STARRS 1	·	1.0 km	MPC · JPL
745006	2010 KB_{10}	—	May 17, 2010	Kitt Peak	Spacewatch	·	3.1 km	MPC · JPL
745007	2010 KC_{10}	—	May 17, 2010	Kitt Peak	Spacewatch	H	390 m	MPC · JPL
745008	2010 KS_{37}	—	May 17, 2010	Mount Lemmon	Mount Lemmon Survey	TIR	2.2 km	MPC · JPL
745009	2010 KU_{37}	—	May 17, 2010	Kitt Peak	Spacewatch	·	950 m	MPC · JPL
745010	2010 KA_{39}	—	May 11, 2010	Mount Lemmon	Mount Lemmon Survey	·	890 m	MPC · JPL
745011	2010 KL_{62}	—	May 21, 2010	Nogales	M. Schwartz, P. R. Holvorcem	·	1.5 km	MPC · JPL
745012	2010 KY_{132}	—	August 30, 2016	Mount Lemmon	Mount Lemmon Survey	·	3.1 km	MPC · JPL
745013	2010 KD_{155}	—	October 24, 2011	Haleakala	Pan-STARRS 1	·	2.9 km	MPC · JPL
745014	2010 LJ	—	June 3, 2010	Nogales	M. Schwartz, P. R. Holvorcem	JUN	770 m	MPC · JPL
745015	2010 LD_{15}	—	June 3, 2010	Kitt Peak	Spacewatch	JUN	880 m	MPC · JPL
745016	2010 LB_{34}	—	April 25, 2010	Mount Lemmon	Mount Lemmon Survey	JUN	930 m	MPC · JPL
745017	2010 LC_{61}	—	June 12, 2010	Nogales	M. Schwartz, P. R. Holvorcem	JUN	870 m	MPC · JPL
745018	2010 LV_{67}	—	June 7, 2010	Kitt Peak	Spacewatch	·	560 m	MPC · JPL
745019	2010 LW_{67}	—	June 7, 2010	Kitt Peak	Spacewatch	·	2.7 km	MPC · JPL
745020	2010 LZ_{105}	—	June 14, 2010	Mount Lemmon	Mount Lemmon Survey	·	1.0 km	MPC · JPL
745021	2010 LM_{108}	—	June 14, 2010	Mount Lemmon	Mount Lemmon Survey	L5	7.3 km	MPC · JPL
745022	2010 LG_{111}	—	June 15, 2010	Mount Lemmon	Mount Lemmon Survey	EUN	1.2 km	MPC · JPL
745023	2010 LJ_{112}	—	June 11, 2010	Mount Lemmon	Mount Lemmon Survey	·	580 m	MPC · JPL
745024	2010 LC_{142}	—	January 20, 2015	Haleakala	Pan-STARRS 1	·	2.1 km	MPC · JPL
745025	2010 LK_{145}	—	January 20, 2015	Haleakala	Pan-STARRS 1	·	2.2 km	MPC · JPL
745026	2010 LZ_{146}	—	October 17, 2012	Mount Lemmon	Mount Lemmon Survey	·	2.4 km	MPC · JPL
745027	2010 LF_{150}	—	December 24, 2017	Haleakala	Pan-STARRS 1	·	1.4 km	MPC · JPL
745028	2010 MQ_{118}	—	October 22, 2003	Apache Point	SDSS	(194)	1.7 km	MPC · JPL
745029	2010 MT_{127}	—	July 10, 2016	Mount Lemmon	Mount Lemmon Survey	·	3.0 km	MPC · JPL
745030	2010 MX_{128}	—	May 7, 2014	Haleakala	Pan-STARRS 1	·	1.5 km	MPC · JPL
745031	2010 MV_{138}	—	October 3, 2010	Westfield	R. Holmes	EOS	1.5 km	MPC · JPL
745032	2010 MZ_{138}	—	January 15, 2018	Mount Lemmon	Mount Lemmon Survey	ADE	1.3 km	MPC · JPL
745033	2010 MQ_{141}	—	July 27, 2011	Haleakala	Pan-STARRS 1	·	2.3 km	MPC · JPL
745034	2010 MS_{141}	—	August 20, 2011	Haleakala	Pan-STARRS 1	·	1.7 km	MPC · JPL
745035	2010 MC_{147}	—	May 10, 2015	Mount Lemmon	Mount Lemmon Survey	·	2.6 km	MPC · JPL
745036	2010 ME_{147}	—	June 17, 2010	Mount Lemmon	Mount Lemmon Survey	·	600 m	MPC · JPL
745037	2010 MM_{147}	—	June 18, 2010	Mount Lemmon	Mount Lemmon Survey	L5	9.3 km	MPC · JPL
745038	2010 MO_{147}	—	May 23, 2014	Haleakala	Pan-STARRS 1	·	940 m	MPC · JPL
745039	2010 MS_{147}	—	June 22, 2010	Mount Lemmon	Mount Lemmon Survey	·	900 m	MPC · JPL
745040	2010 MA_{149}	—	June 19, 2010	Mount Lemmon	Mount Lemmon Survey	·	1.8 km	MPC · JPL
745041	2010 ME_{149}	—	December 18, 2015	Kitt Peak	Spacewatch	L5	9.3 km	MPC · JPL
745042	2010 NW_{30}	—	July 7, 2010	WISE	WISE	·	510 m	MPC · JPL
745043	2010 NM_{114}	—	July 13, 2010	WISE	WISE	·	2.3 km	MPC · JPL
745044	2010 NO_{146}	—	June 12, 2013	Haleakala	Pan-STARRS 1	·	560 m	MPC · JPL
745045	2010 NR_{146}	—	April 13, 2013	Haleakala	Pan-STARRS 1	·	620 m	MPC · JPL
745046	2010 NG_{147}	—	May 25, 2014	Haleakala	Pan-STARRS 1	·	1.9 km	MPC · JPL
745047	2010 NN_{147}	—	October 26, 2014	Haleakala	Pan-STARRS 1	·	500 m	MPC · JPL
745048	2010 OX_{4}	—	July 16, 2010	WISE	WISE	·	990 m	MPC · JPL
745049	2010 OA_{129}	—	August 15, 2013	Haleakala	Pan-STARRS 1	·	510 m	MPC · JPL
745050	2010 OA_{144}	—	July 23, 2015	Haleakala	Pan-STARRS 1	·	2.0 km	MPC · JPL
745051	2010 OJ_{149}	—	September 16, 2017	Haleakala	Pan-STARRS 1	·	1.9 km	MPC · JPL
745052	2010 PC_{23}	—	December 30, 2007	Kitt Peak	Spacewatch	·	830 m	MPC · JPL
745053	2010 PV_{24}	—	August 7, 2010	La Sagra	OAM	·	570 m	MPC · JPL
745054	2010 PU_{59}	—	August 10, 2010	Kitt Peak	Spacewatch	·	1.6 km	MPC · JPL
745055	2010 PT_{61}	—	August 10, 2010	Kitt Peak	Spacewatch	·	1.4 km	MPC · JPL
745056	2010 PH_{73}	—	August 6, 2010	Bergisch Gladbach	W. Bickel	EOS	1.4 km	MPC · JPL
745057	2010 QG_{1}	—	August 20, 2010	Bergisch Gladbach	W. Bickel	·	1.7 km	MPC · JPL
745058	2010 QP_{4}	—	August 19, 2010	XuYi	PMO NEO Survey Program	·	670 m	MPC · JPL
745059	2010 QP_{5}	—	August 31, 2010	Zelenchukskaya	T. V. Krjačko, B. Satovski	·	2.2 km	MPC · JPL
745060	2010 QY_{5}	—	August 30, 2010	La Sagra	OAM	·	2.0 km	MPC · JPL
745061	2010 QS_{6}	—	August 20, 2010	La Sagra	OAM	·	700 m	MPC · JPL
745062	2010 QB_{7}	—	September 11, 2010	Mount Lemmon	Mount Lemmon Survey	MAR	1.2 km	MPC · JPL
745063	2010 RG_{7}	—	September 2, 2010	Mount Lemmon	Mount Lemmon Survey	·	2.4 km	MPC · JPL
745064	2010 RV_{8}	—	December 30, 2008	Mount Lemmon	Mount Lemmon Survey	H	530 m	MPC · JPL
745065	2010 RC_{19}	—	November 28, 2006	Mount Lemmon	Mount Lemmon Survey	·	1.5 km	MPC · JPL
745066	2010 RL_{19}	—	September 3, 2010	Mount Lemmon	Mount Lemmon Survey	·	830 m	MPC · JPL
745067	2010 RS_{19}	—	September 3, 2010	Mount Lemmon	Mount Lemmon Survey	·	1.7 km	MPC · JPL
745068	2010 RE_{22}	—	September 3, 2010	Socorro	LINEAR	·	1 km	MPC · JPL
745069	2010 RO_{27}	—	August 13, 2010	Kitt Peak	Spacewatch	·	1.5 km	MPC · JPL
745070	2010 RY_{31}	—	September 1, 2010	Mount Lemmon	Mount Lemmon Survey	·	2.6 km	MPC · JPL
745071	2010 RW_{33}	—	September 1, 2010	Mount Lemmon	Mount Lemmon Survey	EUN	900 m	MPC · JPL
745072	2010 RY_{37}	—	September 5, 2010	La Sagra	OAM	·	670 m	MPC · JPL
745073	2010 RR_{39}	—	June 20, 2010	Mount Lemmon	Mount Lemmon Survey	·	2.5 km	MPC · JPL
745074	2010 RW_{40}	—	September 3, 2010	Piszkés-tető	K. Sárneczky, Z. Kuli	·	1.2 km	MPC · JPL
745075	2010 RC_{60}	—	September 6, 2010	Kitt Peak	Spacewatch	·	600 m	MPC · JPL
745076	2010 RU_{61}	—	September 6, 2010	Kitt Peak	Spacewatch	·	1.1 km	MPC · JPL
745077	2010 RP_{63}	—	September 6, 2010	La Sagra	OAM	·	590 m	MPC · JPL
745078	2010 RG_{72}	—	February 9, 1999	Kitt Peak	Spacewatch	·	760 m	MPC · JPL
745079	2010 RA_{80}	—	September 6, 2010	Mount Lemmon	Mount Lemmon Survey	·	1.7 km	MPC · JPL
745080	2010 RC_{89}	—	September 17, 2006	Kitt Peak	Spacewatch	·	1.3 km	MPC · JPL
745081	2010 RT_{89}	—	October 2, 2006	Mount Lemmon	Mount Lemmon Survey	·	1.4 km	MPC · JPL
745082	2010 RE_{91}	—	September 10, 2010	Kitt Peak	Spacewatch	·	1.5 km	MPC · JPL
745083	2010 RZ_{97}	—	September 22, 2003	Kitt Peak	Spacewatch	·	630 m	MPC · JPL
745084	2010 RP_{100}	—	September 10, 2010	Kitt Peak	Spacewatch	H	410 m	MPC · JPL
745085	2010 RW_{100}	—	October 19, 2003	Kitt Peak	Spacewatch	·	590 m	MPC · JPL
745086	2010 RZ_{100}	—	September 10, 2010	Kitt Peak	Spacewatch	·	750 m	MPC · JPL
745087	2010 RW_{101}	—	September 10, 2010	Kitt Peak	Spacewatch	·	2.2 km	MPC · JPL
745088	2010 RO_{117}	—	November 15, 2007	Mount Lemmon	Mount Lemmon Survey	·	640 m	MPC · JPL
745089	2010 RV_{119}	—	April 24, 2001	Kitt Peak	Spacewatch	BRG	1.1 km	MPC · JPL
745090	2010 RJ_{120}	—	September 25, 2000	Kitt Peak	Spacewatch	·	500 m	MPC · JPL
745091	2010 RO_{126}	—	October 24, 2003	Apache Point	SDSS	NYS	540 m	MPC · JPL
745092	2010 RX_{128}	—	September 3, 2010	Mount Lemmon	Mount Lemmon Survey	·	1.5 km	MPC · JPL
745093	2010 RO_{133}	—	October 21, 2007	Mount Lemmon	Mount Lemmon Survey	·	680 m	MPC · JPL
745094	2010 RP_{134}	—	September 12, 2010	Tenerife	ESA OGS	(2076)	530 m	MPC · JPL
745095	2010 RU_{149}	—	October 10, 1996	Kitt Peak	Spacewatch	·	660 m	MPC · JPL
745096	2010 RC_{153}	—	September 2, 2010	Mount Lemmon	Mount Lemmon Survey	·	540 m	MPC · JPL
745097	2010 RR_{160}	—	September 2, 2010	La Sagra	OAM	·	1.7 km	MPC · JPL
745098	2010 RF_{172}	—	September 4, 2010	Kitt Peak	Spacewatch	GAL	1.4 km	MPC · JPL
745099	2010 RL_{177}	—	September 11, 2010	Kitt Peak	Spacewatch	·	1.5 km	MPC · JPL
745100	2010 RW_{180}	—	May 1, 2006	Mauna Kea	P. A. Wiegert	·	470 m	MPC · JPL

== 745101–745200 ==
back to top

Designation			Discovery			Properties		Ref
Permanent	Provisional	Named after	Date	Site	Discoverer(s)	Category	Diam.	Ref
745101	2010 RR_{182}	—	April 27, 2009	Mount Lemmon	Mount Lemmon Survey	·	1.6 km	MPC · JPL
745102	2010 RD_{185}	—	September 20, 2003	Kitt Peak	Spacewatch	·	600 m	MPC · JPL
745103	2010 RM_{189}	—	September 11, 2010	Mount Lemmon	Mount Lemmon Survey	·	1.5 km	MPC · JPL
745104	2010 RA_{193}	—	April 29, 2014	Haleakala	Pan-STARRS 1	·	1.5 km	MPC · JPL
745105	2010 RN_{193}	—	September 4, 2010	Mount Lemmon	Mount Lemmon Survey	·	1.2 km	MPC · JPL
745106	2010 RC_{194}	—	February 8, 2013	Haleakala	Pan-STARRS 1	·	1.6 km	MPC · JPL
745107	2010 RS_{194}	—	August 19, 2010	Kitt Peak	Spacewatch	·	600 m	MPC · JPL
745108	2010 RP_{195}	—	September 11, 2010	Kitt Peak	Spacewatch	·	810 m	MPC · JPL
745109	2010 RJ_{200}	—	October 10, 2015	Haleakala	Pan-STARRS 1	·	1.5 km	MPC · JPL
745110	2010 RF_{202}	—	July 11, 2018	Haleakala	Pan-STARRS 1	H	440 m	MPC · JPL
745111	2010 RS_{204}	—	September 6, 2010	Mount Lemmon	Mount Lemmon Survey	·	1.2 km	MPC · JPL
745112	2010 RC_{207}	—	September 2, 2010	Mount Lemmon	Mount Lemmon Survey	·	640 m	MPC · JPL
745113	2010 RP_{211}	—	September 11, 2010	Mount Lemmon	Mount Lemmon Survey	·	1.6 km	MPC · JPL
745114	2010 RB_{221}	—	September 3, 2010	Mount Lemmon	Mount Lemmon Survey	·	1.3 km	MPC · JPL
745115	2010 SF_{2}	—	September 16, 2010	Mount Lemmon	Mount Lemmon Survey	·	650 m	MPC · JPL
745116	2010 SQ_{4}	—	September 16, 2010	Kitt Peak	Spacewatch	·	700 m	MPC · JPL
745117	2010 SO_{9}	—	November 18, 2006	Mount Lemmon	Mount Lemmon Survey	·	1.4 km	MPC · JPL
745118	2010 SM_{12}	—	September 14, 2010	Mount Lemmon	Mount Lemmon Survey	·	650 m	MPC · JPL
745119	2010 SZ_{17}	—	September 19, 2010	Kitt Peak	Spacewatch	·	1.2 km	MPC · JPL
745120	2010 SX_{18}	—	September 6, 2010	Kitt Peak	Spacewatch	·	2.7 km	MPC · JPL
745121	2010 SX_{19}	—	September 18, 2010	Kitt Peak	Spacewatch	·	500 m	MPC · JPL
745122	2010 SQ_{24}	—	September 29, 2010	Mount Lemmon	Mount Lemmon Survey	·	600 m	MPC · JPL
745123	2010 SJ_{27}	—	November 16, 2003	Kitt Peak	Spacewatch	·	660 m	MPC · JPL
745124	2010 SB_{37}	—	September 21, 2010	Bergisch Gladbach	W. Bickel	·	880 m	MPC · JPL
745125	2010 SB_{41}	—	November 1, 2010	Lulin	LUSS	plutino	122 km	MPC · JPL
745126	2010 SO_{46}	—	February 28, 2012	Haleakala	Pan-STARRS 1	·	990 m	MPC · JPL
745127	2010 SR_{46}	—	January 28, 2017	Haleakala	Pan-STARRS 1	EUN	880 m	MPC · JPL
745128	2010 SD_{50}	—	September 17, 2010	Mount Lemmon	Mount Lemmon Survey	·	1.4 km	MPC · JPL
745129	2010 SY_{52}	—	September 18, 2010	Mount Lemmon	Mount Lemmon Survey	615	1.2 km	MPC · JPL
745130	2010 SO_{62}	—	September 18, 2010	Mount Lemmon	Mount Lemmon Survey	·	2.5 km	MPC · JPL
745131	2010 TB_{4}	—	October 2, 2010	Kitt Peak	Spacewatch	·	630 m	MPC · JPL
745132	2010 TQ_{7}	—	September 25, 2005	Kitt Peak	Spacewatch	EOS	1.3 km	MPC · JPL
745133	2010 TA_{8}	—	March 26, 2009	Mount Lemmon	Mount Lemmon Survey	·	990 m	MPC · JPL
745134	2010 TC_{11}	—	September 9, 2010	Kitt Peak	Spacewatch	·	740 m	MPC · JPL
745135	2010 TU_{40}	—	October 2, 2010	Kitt Peak	Spacewatch	AEO	1.0 km	MPC · JPL
745136	2010 TG_{44}	—	October 3, 2010	Kitt Peak	Spacewatch	H	490 m	MPC · JPL
745137	2010 TN_{45}	—	September 17, 2010	Mount Lemmon	Mount Lemmon Survey	·	1.2 km	MPC · JPL
745138	2010 TE_{52}	—	October 8, 2010	Kitt Peak	Spacewatch	·	2.1 km	MPC · JPL
745139	2010 TP_{52}	—	October 8, 2010	Kitt Peak	Spacewatch	·	550 m	MPC · JPL
745140	2010 TQ_{52}	—	October 8, 2010	Kitt Peak	Spacewatch	·	1.5 km	MPC · JPL
745141	2010 TC_{56}	—	September 4, 2010	Kitt Peak	Spacewatch	EUN	930 m	MPC · JPL
745142	2010 TL_{57}	—	October 3, 2010	Catalina	CSS	·	600 m	MPC · JPL
745143	2010 TN_{57}	—	September 15, 2010	Kitt Peak	Spacewatch	ERI	1.3 km	MPC · JPL
745144	2010 TB_{61}	—	September 27, 2000	Kitt Peak	Spacewatch	KOR	1.1 km	MPC · JPL
745145	2010 TE_{64}	—	October 7, 2010	Catalina	CSS	PHO	820 m	MPC · JPL
745146	2010 TW_{73}	—	October 8, 2010	Kitt Peak	Spacewatch	·	2.9 km	MPC · JPL
745147	2010 TH_{74}	—	December 17, 2003	Kitt Peak	Spacewatch	MAS	540 m	MPC · JPL
745148	2010 TC_{77}	—	October 8, 2010	Westfield	R. Holmes	V	490 m	MPC · JPL
745149	2010 TE_{88}	—	October 1, 2010	Mount Lemmon	Mount Lemmon Survey	HOF	2.0 km	MPC · JPL
745150	2010 TL_{91}	—	February 19, 2009	Kitt Peak	Spacewatch	·	510 m	MPC · JPL
745151	2010 TW_{105}	—	October 9, 2010	Kitt Peak	Spacewatch	·	2.3 km	MPC · JPL
745152	2010 TF_{122}	—	October 10, 2010	Cordell-Lorenz	D. T. Durig, Yuratich, B. K.	·	1.5 km	MPC · JPL
745153	2010 TJ_{124}	—	September 14, 2010	Kitt Peak	Spacewatch	H	410 m	MPC · JPL
745154	2010 TL_{125}	—	October 10, 2010	Mount Lemmon	Mount Lemmon Survey	·	1.1 km	MPC · JPL
745155	2010 TA_{126}	—	October 10, 2010	Mount Lemmon	Mount Lemmon Survey	·	490 m	MPC · JPL
745156	2010 TW_{134}	—	October 11, 2010	Mount Lemmon	Mount Lemmon Survey	·	650 m	MPC · JPL
745157	2010 TL_{139}	—	October 11, 2010	Mount Lemmon	Mount Lemmon Survey	·	730 m	MPC · JPL
745158	2010 TO_{145}	—	October 11, 2010	Mount Lemmon	Mount Lemmon Survey	GEF	980 m	MPC · JPL
745159	2010 TF_{146}	—	October 11, 2010	Mount Lemmon	Mount Lemmon Survey	·	520 m	MPC · JPL
745160	2010 TY_{146}	—	October 11, 2010	Mount Lemmon	Mount Lemmon Survey	·	700 m	MPC · JPL
745161	2010 TY_{149}	—	October 1, 2010	La Sagra	OAM	·	1.2 km	MPC · JPL
745162	2010 TX_{159}	—	September 4, 2010	Kitt Peak	Spacewatch	·	2.2 km	MPC · JPL
745163	2010 TU_{164}	—	September 18, 2010	Mount Lemmon	Mount Lemmon Survey	·	830 m	MPC · JPL
745164	2010 TB_{165}	—	September 18, 2010	Mount Lemmon	Mount Lemmon Survey	·	870 m	MPC · JPL
745165	2010 TY_{168}	—	October 2, 2010	Tzec Maun	E. Schwab	·	560 m	MPC · JPL
745166	2010 TZ_{169}	—	October 12, 2010	Vail-Jarnac	Glinos, T.	·	990 m	MPC · JPL
745167	2010 TA_{170}	—	September 18, 2010	Mount Lemmon	Mount Lemmon Survey	·	1.4 km	MPC · JPL
745168	2010 TU_{177}	—	September 30, 2003	Kitt Peak	Spacewatch	·	600 m	MPC · JPL
745169	2010 TH_{186}	—	August 29, 2005	Palomar	NEAT	(18466)	1.9 km	MPC · JPL
745170	2010 TP_{186}	—	October 14, 2010	Mount Lemmon	Mount Lemmon Survey	·	580 m	MPC · JPL
745171	2010 TH_{187}	—	October 1, 2010	Moletai	K. Černis	(2076)	580 m	MPC · JPL
745172	2010 TV_{187}	—	March 22, 2012	Mount Lemmon	Mount Lemmon Survey	·	1.4 km	MPC · JPL
745173	2010 TN_{192}	—	November 11, 2010	Mount Lemmon	Mount Lemmon Survey	L4	6.1 km	MPC · JPL
745174	2010 TM_{196}	—	April 9, 2016	Haleakala	Pan-STARRS 1	PHO	710 m	MPC · JPL
745175	2010 TV_{196}	—	April 2, 2013	Mount Lemmon	Mount Lemmon Survey	·	1.0 km	MPC · JPL
745176	2010 TG_{197}	—	October 13, 2010	Mount Lemmon	Mount Lemmon Survey	PHO	710 m	MPC · JPL
745177	2010 TC_{199}	—	October 12, 2010	Mount Lemmon	Mount Lemmon Survey	L4	6.2 km	MPC · JPL
745178	2010 TN_{199}	—	March 31, 2016	Mount Lemmon	Mount Lemmon Survey	·	850 m	MPC · JPL
745179	2010 TC_{200}	—	October 10, 2010	Mount Lemmon	Mount Lemmon Survey	V	490 m	MPC · JPL
745180	2010 TG_{200}	—	May 31, 2013	Mount Lemmon	Mount Lemmon Survey	·	1.0 km	MPC · JPL
745181	2010 TF_{204}	—	March 18, 2017	Mount Lemmon	Mount Lemmon Survey	·	1.7 km	MPC · JPL
745182	2010 TD_{208}	—	November 21, 2014	Haleakala	Pan-STARRS 1	L5	8.4 km	MPC · JPL
745183	2010 TB_{213}	—	October 14, 2010	Mount Lemmon	Mount Lemmon Survey	DOR	1.3 km	MPC · JPL
745184	2010 TO_{219}	—	October 13, 2010	Mount Lemmon	Mount Lemmon Survey	·	1.4 km	MPC · JPL
745185	2010 TD_{235}	—	October 11, 2010	Mount Lemmon	Mount Lemmon Survey	·	680 m	MPC · JPL
745186	2010 UA_{2}	—	October 17, 2010	Mount Lemmon	Mount Lemmon Survey	·	3.0 km	MPC · JPL
745187	2010 UL_{3}	—	October 17, 2010	Mount Lemmon	Mount Lemmon Survey	EOS	1.8 km	MPC · JPL
745188	2010 UW_{6}	—	October 15, 2010	Mayhill-ISON	L. Elenin	·	1.8 km	MPC · JPL
745189	2010 UQ_{13}	—	October 17, 2010	Mount Lemmon	Mount Lemmon Survey	·	510 m	MPC · JPL
745190	2010 UJ_{16}	—	October 10, 2001	Palomar	NEAT	·	1.5 km	MPC · JPL
745191	2010 UR_{19}	—	October 28, 2010	Mount Lemmon	Mount Lemmon Survey	·	660 m	MPC · JPL
745192	2010 UW_{19}	—	October 28, 2010	Mount Lemmon	Mount Lemmon Survey	·	1.9 km	MPC · JPL
745193	2010 UJ_{20}	—	October 28, 2010	Mount Lemmon	Mount Lemmon Survey	·	1.7 km	MPC · JPL
745194	2010 US_{23}	—	October 17, 2010	Mount Lemmon	Mount Lemmon Survey	·	2.7 km	MPC · JPL
745195	2010 UK_{27}	—	September 11, 2010	Mount Lemmon	Mount Lemmon Survey	·	580 m	MPC · JPL
745196	2010 UG_{28}	—	October 28, 2010	Mount Lemmon	Mount Lemmon Survey	MAS	650 m	MPC · JPL
745197	2010 UA_{32}	—	December 4, 2007	Mount Lemmon	Mount Lemmon Survey	·	480 m	MPC · JPL
745198	2010 UF_{35}	—	September 28, 2003	Kitt Peak	Spacewatch	·	620 m	MPC · JPL
745199	2010 UL_{39}	—	October 29, 2010	Piszkés-tető	K. Sárneczky, Z. Kuli	·	1.0 km	MPC · JPL
745200	2010 UY_{42}	—	February 7, 2008	Kitt Peak	Spacewatch	·	520 m	MPC · JPL

== 745201–745300 ==
back to top

Designation			Discovery			Properties		Ref
Permanent	Provisional	Named after	Date	Site	Discoverer(s)	Category	Diam.	Ref
745201	2010 UN_{43}	—	October 19, 2010	Mount Lemmon	Mount Lemmon Survey	·	1.3 km	MPC · JPL
745202	2010 UN_{48}	—	October 31, 2010	Kitt Peak	Spacewatch	·	740 m	MPC · JPL
745203	2010 UP_{49}	—	June 30, 2005	Palomar	NEAT	·	1.7 km	MPC · JPL
745204	2010 UP_{51}	—	October 11, 2010	Catalina	CSS	·	610 m	MPC · JPL
745205	2010 UK_{56}	—	October 29, 2010	Kitt Peak	Spacewatch	·	750 m	MPC · JPL
745206	2010 UO_{58}	—	August 31, 2005	Kitt Peak	Spacewatch	·	1.5 km	MPC · JPL
745207	2010 UO_{63}	—	October 13, 2010	Mount Lemmon	Mount Lemmon Survey	·	630 m	MPC · JPL
745208	2010 UB_{69}	—	October 31, 2010	Piszkés-tető	K. Sárneczky, Z. Kuli	WIT	790 m	MPC · JPL
745209	2010 UD_{72}	—	September 18, 2010	Mount Lemmon	Mount Lemmon Survey	·	670 m	MPC · JPL
745210	2010 UF_{74}	—	September 11, 2010	Mount Lemmon	Mount Lemmon Survey	V	450 m	MPC · JPL
745211	2010 UL_{83}	—	October 29, 2010	Mount Lemmon	Mount Lemmon Survey	·	1.5 km	MPC · JPL
745212	2010 UJ_{92}	—	October 9, 2010	Catalina	CSS	H	480 m	MPC · JPL
745213	2010 UB_{97}	—	November 16, 2003	Kitt Peak	Spacewatch	·	600 m	MPC · JPL
745214	2010 UE_{101}	—	February 10, 2008	Kitt Peak	Spacewatch	·	840 m	MPC · JPL
745215	2010 UG_{105}	—	November 3, 2010	Mount Lemmon	Mount Lemmon Survey	·	2.7 km	MPC · JPL
745216	2010 UA_{107}	—	October 31, 2010	Piszkés-tető	K. Sárneczky, Z. Kuli	·	850 m	MPC · JPL
745217	2010 UA_{111}	—	October 29, 2010	Mount Lemmon	Mount Lemmon Survey	·	830 m	MPC · JPL
745218	2010 UM_{112}	—	October 28, 2010	Mount Lemmon	Mount Lemmon Survey	·	1.9 km	MPC · JPL
745219	2010 UF_{114}	—	October 17, 2010	Mount Lemmon	Mount Lemmon Survey	·	1.7 km	MPC · JPL
745220	2010 UL_{115}	—	July 27, 2014	Haleakala	Pan-STARRS 1	·	1.4 km	MPC · JPL
745221	2010 UO_{115}	—	March 21, 2017	Haleakala	Pan-STARRS 1	DOR	2.0 km	MPC · JPL
745222	2010 UX_{115}	—	August 20, 2014	Haleakala	Pan-STARRS 1	·	1.4 km	MPC · JPL
745223	2010 UN_{121}	—	October 17, 2010	Mount Lemmon	Mount Lemmon Survey	·	630 m	MPC · JPL
745224	2010 UH_{128}	—	October 17, 2010	Mount Lemmon	Mount Lemmon Survey	·	1.4 km	MPC · JPL
745225	2010 UF_{129}	—	October 17, 2010	Catalina	CSS	·	2.5 km	MPC · JPL
745226	2010 UN_{131}	—	October 30, 2010	Kitt Peak	Spacewatch	L4	5.6 km	MPC · JPL
745227	2010 VG_{1}	—	November 3, 2010	Kitt Peak	Spacewatch	APO · PHA	260 m	MPC · JPL
745228	2010 VA_{18}	—	November 2, 2010	Mount Lemmon	Mount Lemmon Survey	·	500 m	MPC · JPL
745229	2010 VY_{18}	—	November 2, 2010	Mount Lemmon	Mount Lemmon Survey	GAL	1.1 km	MPC · JPL
745230	2010 VH_{27}	—	November 1, 2010	Kitt Peak	Spacewatch	H	510 m	MPC · JPL
745231	2010 VP_{27}	—	October 28, 2010	Mount Lemmon	Mount Lemmon Survey	JUN	880 m	MPC · JPL
745232	2010 VH_{28}	—	October 29, 2010	Piszkés-tető	K. Sárneczky, S. Kürti	·	870 m	MPC · JPL
745233	2010 VC_{31}	—	September 11, 2010	Mount Lemmon	Mount Lemmon Survey	·	540 m	MPC · JPL
745234	2010 VN_{32}	—	October 11, 2010	Mount Lemmon	Mount Lemmon Survey	·	760 m	MPC · JPL
745235	2010 VQ_{33}	—	October 29, 2010	Mount Lemmon	Mount Lemmon Survey	·	1.3 km	MPC · JPL
745236	2010 VU_{34}	—	September 12, 2010	Westfield	R. Holmes	·	1.2 km	MPC · JPL
745237	2010 VZ_{34}	—	September 17, 2010	Mount Lemmon	Mount Lemmon Survey	·	1.5 km	MPC · JPL
745238	2010 VM_{48}	—	November 2, 2010	Kitt Peak	Spacewatch	PHO	930 m	MPC · JPL
745239	2010 VS_{49}	—	November 3, 2010	Kitt Peak	Spacewatch	·	1.8 km	MPC · JPL
745240	2010 VV_{53}	—	September 14, 2005	Kitt Peak	Spacewatch	AGN	920 m	MPC · JPL
745241	2010 VE_{59}	—	November 4, 2010	Mount Lemmon	Mount Lemmon Survey	·	770 m	MPC · JPL
745242	2010 VX_{66}	—	October 2, 2010	Mount Lemmon	Mount Lemmon Survey	·	840 m	MPC · JPL
745243	2010 VG_{76}	—	November 1, 2010	Piszkés-tető	K. Sárneczky, Z. Kuli	·	1.4 km	MPC · JPL
745244	2010 VH_{78}	—	November 5, 2010	Mayhill-ISON	L. Elenin	·	1.0 km	MPC · JPL
745245	2010 VA_{81}	—	November 3, 2010	Mount Lemmon	Mount Lemmon Survey	·	500 m	MPC · JPL
745246	2010 VK_{81}	—	November 3, 2010	Mount Lemmon	Mount Lemmon Survey	·	1.9 km	MPC · JPL
745247	2010 VQ_{85}	—	November 5, 2010	Kitt Peak	Spacewatch	·	1.1 km	MPC · JPL
745248	2010 VV_{87}	—	October 29, 2010	Kitt Peak	Spacewatch	·	1.8 km	MPC · JPL
745249	2010 VV_{96}	—	November 2, 2010	Mount Lemmon	Mount Lemmon Survey	·	690 m	MPC · JPL
745250	2010 VB_{101}	—	November 5, 2010	Kitt Peak	Spacewatch	JUN	840 m	MPC · JPL
745251	2010 VM_{101}	—	November 1, 2010	Kitt Peak	Spacewatch	·	850 m	MPC · JPL
745252	2010 VA_{110}	—	November 6, 2010	Mount Lemmon	Mount Lemmon Survey	·	830 m	MPC · JPL
745253	2010 VK_{113}	—	November 7, 2010	Kitt Peak	Spacewatch	·	740 m	MPC · JPL
745254 Friedhelm	2010 VM_{122}	Friedhelm	November 6, 2010	Tzec Maun	E. Schwab	·	1.2 km	MPC · JPL
745255	2010 VC_{125}	—	November 8, 2010	Mount Lemmon	Mount Lemmon Survey	·	1.2 km	MPC · JPL
745256	2010 VX_{128}	—	October 29, 2003	Kitt Peak	Spacewatch	·	500 m	MPC · JPL
745257	2010 VO_{140}	—	October 28, 2010	Mount Lemmon	Mount Lemmon Survey	·	1.7 km	MPC · JPL
745258	2010 VH_{147}	—	November 6, 2010	Mount Lemmon	Mount Lemmon Survey	·	1.5 km	MPC · JPL
745259	2010 VH_{148}	—	August 20, 2004	Catalina	CSS	·	2.2 km	MPC · JPL
745260	2010 VO_{154}	—	November 7, 2010	Mount Lemmon	Mount Lemmon Survey	·	640 m	MPC · JPL
745261	2010 VP_{161}	—	October 29, 2010	Kitt Peak	Spacewatch	MAS	620 m	MPC · JPL
745262	2010 VD_{165}	—	October 28, 2010	Mount Lemmon	Mount Lemmon Survey	THB	2.7 km	MPC · JPL
745263	2010 VD_{177}	—	November 11, 2010	Mount Lemmon	Mount Lemmon Survey	·	1.3 km	MPC · JPL
745264	2010 VV_{184}	—	October 13, 2010	Mount Lemmon	Mount Lemmon Survey	·	940 m	MPC · JPL
745265	2010 VZ_{189}	—	November 13, 2010	Mount Lemmon	Mount Lemmon Survey	L4	6.4 km	MPC · JPL
745266	2010 VQ_{193}	—	November 5, 2010	Mount Lemmon	Mount Lemmon Survey	·	860 m	MPC · JPL
745267	2010 VF_{198}	—	July 29, 2005	Palomar	NEAT	·	2.0 km	MPC · JPL
745268	2010 VH_{206}	—	December 13, 2001	Palomar	NEAT	·	2.2 km	MPC · JPL
745269	2010 VS_{213}	—	September 16, 2010	Mount Lemmon	Mount Lemmon Survey	·	960 m	MPC · JPL
745270	2010 VX_{214}	—	October 13, 2010	Mount Lemmon	Mount Lemmon Survey	GAL	1.4 km	MPC · JPL
745271	2010 VM_{227}	—	October 14, 2010	Mount Lemmon	Mount Lemmon Survey	·	1.3 km	MPC · JPL
745272	2010 VF_{228}	—	November 3, 2010	Mount Lemmon	Mount Lemmon Survey	·	460 m	MPC · JPL
745273	2010 VK_{229}	—	March 6, 2016	Haleakala	Pan-STARRS 1	V	530 m	MPC · JPL
745274	2010 VX_{232}	—	March 12, 2016	Haleakala	Pan-STARRS 1	·	560 m	MPC · JPL
745275	2010 VH_{233}	—	December 30, 2005	Kitt Peak	Spacewatch	·	2.0 km	MPC · JPL
745276	2010 VM_{233}	—	November 11, 2010	Kitt Peak	Spacewatch	V	450 m	MPC · JPL
745277	2010 VS_{233}	—	February 29, 2016	Haleakala	Pan-STARRS 1	·	800 m	MPC · JPL
745278	2010 VS_{238}	—	November 3, 2010	Kitt Peak	Spacewatch	(5)	1.0 km	MPC · JPL
745279	2010 VD_{239}	—	November 10, 2010	Mount Lemmon	Mount Lemmon Survey	·	1.5 km	MPC · JPL
745280	2010 VE_{239}	—	February 4, 2017	Haleakala	Pan-STARRS 1	·	1.2 km	MPC · JPL
745281	2010 VP_{239}	—	August 28, 2014	Haleakala	Pan-STARRS 1	·	1.3 km	MPC · JPL
745282	2010 VO_{241}	—	June 17, 2018	Haleakala	Pan-STARRS 2	EUN	1.1 km	MPC · JPL
745283	2010 VK_{244}	—	November 8, 2010	Mount Lemmon	Mount Lemmon Survey	V	550 m	MPC · JPL
745284	2010 VO_{245}	—	November 12, 2010	Mount Lemmon	Mount Lemmon Survey	L4	7.1 km	MPC · JPL
745285	2010 VA_{248}	—	February 3, 2016	Haleakala	Pan-STARRS 1	EUN	1.1 km	MPC · JPL
745286	2010 VB_{248}	—	November 12, 2010	Mount Lemmon	Mount Lemmon Survey	L4	6.4 km	MPC · JPL
745287	2010 VH_{253}	—	November 6, 2010	Kitt Peak	Spacewatch	·	2.4 km	MPC · JPL
745288	2010 VF_{257}	—	November 6, 2010	Mount Lemmon	Mount Lemmon Survey	L4	6.7 km	MPC · JPL
745289	2010 VQ_{257}	—	November 8, 2010	Mount Lemmon	Mount Lemmon Survey	L4	7.6 km	MPC · JPL
745290	2010 VR_{274}	—	November 2, 2010	Mount Lemmon	Mount Lemmon Survey	L4	6.6 km	MPC · JPL
745291	2010 VL_{278}	—	November 12, 2010	Mount Lemmon	Mount Lemmon Survey	·	1.6 km	MPC · JPL
745292	2010 WP	—	October 30, 2010	Kitt Peak	Spacewatch	MAS	500 m	MPC · JPL
745293	2010 WY_{2}	—	November 8, 2010	Kitt Peak	Spacewatch	·	670 m	MPC · JPL
745294	2010 WR_{6}	—	October 15, 2010	Sandlot	G. Hug	·	620 m	MPC · JPL
745295	2010 WQ_{11}	—	October 9, 2005	Kitt Peak	Spacewatch	·	1.3 km	MPC · JPL
745296	2010 WH_{12}	—	November 16, 2010	Mount Lemmon	Mount Lemmon Survey	L4	10 km	MPC · JPL
745297	2010 WL_{14}	—	September 20, 2003	Kitt Peak	Spacewatch	·	480 m	MPC · JPL
745298	2010 WB_{27}	—	November 2, 2010	Kitt Peak	Spacewatch	·	1.1 km	MPC · JPL
745299	2010 WJ_{27}	—	August 29, 2006	Kitt Peak	Spacewatch	·	640 m	MPC · JPL
745300	2010 WR_{27}	—	November 15, 2003	Kitt Peak	Spacewatch	·	600 m	MPC · JPL

== 745301–745400 ==
back to top

Designation			Discovery			Properties		Ref
Permanent	Provisional	Named after	Date	Site	Discoverer(s)	Category	Diam.	Ref
745301	2010 WV_{28}	—	April 17, 2005	Kitt Peak	Spacewatch	·	540 m	MPC · JPL
745302	2010 WH_{31}	—	November 27, 2010	Mount Lemmon	Mount Lemmon Survey	·	1.1 km	MPC · JPL
745303	2010 WU_{31}	—	November 11, 2010	Mount Lemmon	Mount Lemmon Survey	NEM	1.8 km	MPC · JPL
745304	2010 WV_{54}	—	November 28, 2010	Mount Lemmon	Mount Lemmon Survey	·	670 m	MPC · JPL
745305	2010 WZ_{68}	—	November 30, 2010	Mount Lemmon	Mount Lemmon Survey	·	1.8 km	MPC · JPL
745306	2010 WR_{73}	—	November 30, 2010	Mount Lemmon	Mount Lemmon Survey	·	1.4 km	MPC · JPL
745307	2010 WO_{78}	—	November 30, 2010	Mount Lemmon	Mount Lemmon Survey	·	800 m	MPC · JPL
745308	2010 XY_{3}	—	November 30, 2010	Calvin-Rehoboth	L. A. Molnar	EOS	1.8 km	MPC · JPL
745309	2010 XH_{7}	—	September 29, 2009	Mount Lemmon	Mount Lemmon Survey	L4 · (8060)	6.8 km	MPC · JPL
745310	2010 XW_{14}	—	September 29, 2009	Kitt Peak	Spacewatch	L4	5.9 km	MPC · JPL
745311	2010 XC_{15}	—	December 5, 2010	Catalina	CSS	ATE · PHA	180 m	MPC · JPL
745312	2010 XN_{20}	—	December 2, 2010	Mayhill-ISON	L. Elenin	HNS	950 m	MPC · JPL
745313	2010 XE_{21}	—	November 17, 2006	Mount Lemmon	Mount Lemmon Survey	PHO	790 m	MPC · JPL
745314	2010 XV_{32}	—	December 2, 2010	Mount Lemmon	Mount Lemmon Survey	·	870 m	MPC · JPL
745315	2010 XE_{39}	—	December 4, 2010	Kitt Peak	Spacewatch	·	1.0 km	MPC · JPL
745316	2010 XS_{46}	—	November 1, 2006	Kitt Peak	Spacewatch	NYS	820 m	MPC · JPL
745317	2010 XE_{50}	—	December 19, 2003	Kitt Peak	Spacewatch	·	740 m	MPC · JPL
745318	2010 XS_{57}	—	December 8, 2010	Kitt Peak	Spacewatch	·	630 m	MPC · JPL
745319	2010 XK_{60}	—	November 8, 2010	Kitt Peak	Spacewatch	·	910 m	MPC · JPL
745320	2010 XV_{63}	—	December 13, 2010	Mount Lemmon	Mount Lemmon Survey	·	770 m	MPC · JPL
745321	2010 XC_{68}	—	November 14, 2010	Mount Lemmon	Mount Lemmon Survey	PHO	770 m	MPC · JPL
745322	2010 XU_{83}	—	December 2, 2010	Mount Lemmon	Mount Lemmon Survey	EUP	3.2 km	MPC · JPL
745323	2010 XH_{85}	—	May 15, 2009	Kitt Peak	Spacewatch	H	500 m	MPC · JPL
745324	2010 XW_{87}	—	December 14, 2010	Kitt Peak	Spacewatch	H	490 m	MPC · JPL
745325	2010 XP_{91}	—	November 11, 2010	Mount Lemmon	Mount Lemmon Survey	L4	6.6 km	MPC · JPL
745326	2010 XL_{94}	—	December 3, 2010	Kitt Peak	Spacewatch	·	930 m	MPC · JPL
745327	2010 XL_{95}	—	August 8, 2013	Haleakala	Pan-STARRS 1	·	790 m	MPC · JPL
745328	2010 XP_{95}	—	December 13, 2010	Mount Lemmon	Mount Lemmon Survey	·	940 m	MPC · JPL
745329	2010 XR_{95}	—	December 13, 2010	Mount Lemmon	Mount Lemmon Survey	·	740 m	MPC · JPL
745330	2010 XV_{95}	—	December 3, 2010	Mount Lemmon	Mount Lemmon Survey	·	630 m	MPC · JPL
745331	2010 XF_{96}	—	December 2, 2010	Kitt Peak	Spacewatch	H	560 m	MPC · JPL
745332	2010 XL_{96}	—	October 11, 2015	Mount Lemmon	Mount Lemmon Survey	·	2.3 km	MPC · JPL
745333	2010 XR_{96}	—	December 5, 2010	Mount Lemmon	Mount Lemmon Survey	·	2.6 km	MPC · JPL
745334	2010 XN_{97}	—	December 3, 2010	Mount Lemmon	Mount Lemmon Survey	·	1.5 km	MPC · JPL
745335	2010 XR_{100}	—	March 13, 2012	Mount Lemmon	Mount Lemmon Survey	·	1.6 km	MPC · JPL
745336	2010 XL_{101}	—	December 5, 2010	Mount Lemmon	Mount Lemmon Survey	·	570 m	MPC · JPL
745337	2010 XO_{101}	—	March 2, 2017	Mount Lemmon	Mount Lemmon Survey	·	1.9 km	MPC · JPL
745338	2010 XE_{102}	—	July 5, 2016	Haleakala	Pan-STARRS 1	·	590 m	MPC · JPL
745339	2010 XA_{103}	—	January 21, 2012	Kitt Peak	Spacewatch	GEF	1.1 km	MPC · JPL
745340	2010 XH_{103}	—	December 2, 2010	Mount Lemmon	Mount Lemmon Survey	·	1.7 km	MPC · JPL
745341	2010 XB_{104}	—	December 8, 2010	Mayhill-ISON	L. Elenin	·	930 m	MPC · JPL
745342	2010 XE_{104}	—	October 1, 2014	Haleakala	Pan-STARRS 1	·	1.8 km	MPC · JPL
745343	2010 XO_{104}	—	February 2, 2016	Haleakala	Pan-STARRS 1	·	1.4 km	MPC · JPL
745344	2010 XB_{107}	—	May 9, 2013	Haleakala	Pan-STARRS 1	GEF	910 m	MPC · JPL
745345	2010 XB_{112}	—	December 1, 2010	Mount Lemmon	Mount Lemmon Survey	·	600 m	MPC · JPL
745346	2010 XM_{112}	—	December 14, 2010	Mount Lemmon	Mount Lemmon Survey	PHO	780 m	MPC · JPL
745347	2010 XL_{118}	—	December 9, 2010	Mount Lemmon	Mount Lemmon Survey	L4	8.2 km	MPC · JPL
745348	2010 YG_{1}	—	December 2, 2010	Mount Lemmon	Mount Lemmon Survey	·	1.6 km	MPC · JPL
745349	2010 YU_{1}	—	November 28, 2010	Mount Lemmon	Mount Lemmon Survey	·	2.2 km	MPC · JPL
745350	2010 YX_{5}	—	December 25, 2010	Mount Lemmon	Mount Lemmon Survey	V	450 m	MPC · JPL
745351	2011 AB_{1}	—	December 13, 2010	Mount Lemmon	Mount Lemmon Survey	·	850 m	MPC · JPL
745352	2011 AU_{7}	—	December 6, 2010	Mount Lemmon	Mount Lemmon Survey	·	990 m	MPC · JPL
745353	2011 AF_{11}	—	February 27, 2000	Catalina	CSS	·	940 m	MPC · JPL
745354	2011 AS_{12}	—	January 2, 2011	Mount Lemmon	Mount Lemmon Survey	·	2.2 km	MPC · JPL
745355	2011 AH_{17}	—	November 27, 2010	Mount Lemmon	Mount Lemmon Survey	·	1.0 km	MPC · JPL
745356	2011 AF_{21}	—	October 23, 2006	Kitt Peak	Spacewatch	·	780 m	MPC · JPL
745357	2011 AB_{26}	—	April 21, 2009	Catalina	CSS	H	580 m	MPC · JPL
745358	2011 AR_{28}	—	January 2, 2011	Catalina	CSS	·	1 km	MPC · JPL
745359	2011 AX_{29}	—	September 19, 1998	Apache Point	SDSS	·	2.1 km	MPC · JPL
745360	2011 AM_{31}	—	October 22, 2006	Kitt Peak	Spacewatch	·	670 m	MPC · JPL
745361	2011 AW_{35}	—	January 11, 2011	Catalina	CSS	·	2.3 km	MPC · JPL
745362	2011 AN_{41}	—	September 15, 2009	Kitt Peak	Spacewatch	·	2.1 km	MPC · JPL
745363	2011 AZ_{44}	—	January 10, 2011	Kitt Peak	Spacewatch	·	3.0 km	MPC · JPL
745364	2011 AQ_{45}	—	January 10, 2011	Kitt Peak	Spacewatch	·	1.1 km	MPC · JPL
745365	2011 AK_{47}	—	October 21, 2006	Lulin	LUSS	NYS	890 m	MPC · JPL
745366	2011 AE_{51}	—	December 5, 2010	Mount Lemmon	Mount Lemmon Survey	·	3.4 km	MPC · JPL
745367	2011 AK_{53}	—	January 11, 2011	Kitt Peak	Spacewatch	·	900 m	MPC · JPL
745368	2011 AV_{53}	—	January 7, 2006	Mount Lemmon	Mount Lemmon Survey	·	1.5 km	MPC · JPL
745369	2011 AP_{55}	—	February 17, 2004	Socorro	LINEAR	·	1.0 km	MPC · JPL
745370	2011 AQ_{59}	—	March 14, 2004	Kitt Peak	Spacewatch	MAS	500 m	MPC · JPL
745371	2011 AK_{61}	—	January 13, 2011	Kitt Peak	Spacewatch	·	670 m	MPC · JPL
745372	2011 AR_{68}	—	December 10, 2010	Mount Lemmon	Mount Lemmon Survey	ERI	1.2 km	MPC · JPL
745373	2011 AV_{68}	—	January 14, 2011	Kitt Peak	Spacewatch	GEF	1.1 km	MPC · JPL
745374	2011 AQ_{70}	—	January 14, 2011	Mount Lemmon	Mount Lemmon Survey	·	2.0 km	MPC · JPL
745375	2011 AA_{73}	—	March 16, 2004	Kitt Peak	Spacewatch	·	1.1 km	MPC · JPL
745376	2011 AD_{78}	—	January 14, 2011	Catalina	CSS	·	2.2 km	MPC · JPL
745377	2011 AF_{80}	—	January 8, 2016	Haleakala	Pan-STARRS 1	·	1.4 km	MPC · JPL
745378	2011 AQ_{83}	—	January 2, 2011	Mount Lemmon	Mount Lemmon Survey	V	440 m	MPC · JPL
745379	2011 AP_{84}	—	June 5, 2016	Haleakala	Pan-STARRS 1	·	830 m	MPC · JPL
745380	2011 AV_{84}	—	August 9, 2013	Kitt Peak	Spacewatch	·	850 m	MPC · JPL
745381	2011 AG_{85}	—	November 11, 2010	Mount Lemmon	Mount Lemmon Survey	·	2.4 km	MPC · JPL
745382	2011 AM_{85}	—	January 30, 2012	Mount Lemmon	Mount Lemmon Survey	·	1.4 km	MPC · JPL
745383	2011 AG_{86}	—	September 23, 2015	Haleakala	Pan-STARRS 1	·	2.6 km	MPC · JPL
745384	2011 AW_{86}	—	January 14, 2011	Kitt Peak	Spacewatch	·	2.3 km	MPC · JPL
745385	2011 AY_{86}	—	August 15, 2013	Haleakala	Pan-STARRS 1	PHO	850 m	MPC · JPL
745386	2011 AE_{87}	—	January 14, 2011	Mount Lemmon	Mount Lemmon Survey	·	1.4 km	MPC · JPL
745387	2011 AH_{87}	—	August 31, 2014	Haleakala	Pan-STARRS 1	·	2.1 km	MPC · JPL
745388	2011 AJ_{87}	—	April 19, 2012	Mount Lemmon	Mount Lemmon Survey	DOR	2.1 km	MPC · JPL
745389	2011 AP_{89}	—	December 4, 2015	Haleakala	Pan-STARRS 1	·	1.8 km	MPC · JPL
745390	2011 AS_{89}	—	December 14, 2015	Mount Lemmon	Mount Lemmon Survey	·	1.6 km	MPC · JPL
745391	2011 AK_{90}	—	October 25, 2014	Haleakala	Pan-STARRS 1	·	1.6 km	MPC · JPL
745392	2011 AL_{90}	—	February 25, 2017	Haleakala	Pan-STARRS 1	EOS	1.7 km	MPC · JPL
745393	2011 AK_{93}	—	January 4, 2011	Mount Lemmon	Mount Lemmon Survey	·	2.2 km	MPC · JPL
745394	2011 AF_{97}	—	January 8, 2011	Mount Lemmon	Mount Lemmon Survey	·	1.8 km	MPC · JPL
745395	2011 AZ_{106}	—	January 10, 2011	Mount Lemmon	Mount Lemmon Survey	TIR	2.4 km	MPC · JPL
745396	2011 BL	—	January 16, 2011	Mount Lemmon	Mount Lemmon Survey	·	570 m	MPC · JPL
745397	2011 BK_{3}	—	January 16, 2011	Mount Lemmon	Mount Lemmon Survey	·	2.5 km	MPC · JPL
745398	2011 BG_{5}	—	January 16, 2011	Mount Lemmon	Mount Lemmon Survey	·	1.3 km	MPC · JPL
745399	2011 BN_{5}	—	January 12, 2011	Mount Lemmon	Mount Lemmon Survey	·	610 m	MPC · JPL
745400	2011 BG_{6}	—	January 16, 2011	Mount Lemmon	Mount Lemmon Survey	·	820 m	MPC · JPL

== 745401–745500 ==
back to top

Designation			Discovery			Properties		Ref
Permanent	Provisional	Named after	Date	Site	Discoverer(s)	Category	Diam.	Ref
745401	2011 BR_{6}	—	January 16, 2011	Mount Lemmon	Mount Lemmon Survey	·	2.2 km	MPC · JPL
745402	2011 BJ_{7}	—	February 11, 2004	Kitt Peak	Spacewatch	·	760 m	MPC · JPL
745403	2011 BN_{12}	—	January 23, 2011	Mount Lemmon	Mount Lemmon Survey	·	2.0 km	MPC · JPL
745404	2011 BJ_{16}	—	August 12, 2006	Palomar	NEAT	PHO	1.1 km	MPC · JPL
745405	2011 BJ_{18}	—	January 26, 2011	Kitt Peak	Spacewatch	·	990 m	MPC · JPL
745406	2011 BV_{18}	—	January 24, 2011	Alder Springs	Levin, K.	EOS	1.3 km	MPC · JPL
745407	2011 BK_{19}	—	December 9, 2006	7300	W. K. Y. Yeung	·	810 m	MPC · JPL
745408	2011 BR_{26}	—	January 13, 2004	Kitt Peak	Spacewatch	·	730 m	MPC · JPL
745409	2011 BL_{30}	—	January 26, 2011	Mount Lemmon	Mount Lemmon Survey	·	2.5 km	MPC · JPL
745410	2011 BQ_{30}	—	February 8, 2008	Kitt Peak	Spacewatch	·	560 m	MPC · JPL
745411	2011 BK_{44}	—	January 30, 2011	Piszkés-tető	K. Sárneczky, S. Kürti	·	2.3 km	MPC · JPL
745412	2011 BE_{47}	—	September 18, 2009	Kitt Peak	Spacewatch	·	1.3 km	MPC · JPL
745413	2011 BU_{51}	—	January 30, 2011	Mount Lemmon	Mount Lemmon Survey	(5)	880 m	MPC · JPL
745414	2011 BQ_{52}	—	January 30, 2011	Mount Lemmon	Mount Lemmon Survey	·	2.1 km	MPC · JPL
745415	2011 BB_{57}	—	August 4, 2005	Palomar	NEAT	PHO	980 m	MPC · JPL
745416	2011 BR_{59}	—	January 31, 2011	Siding Spring	SSS	·	1.4 km	MPC · JPL
745417	2011 BF_{68}	—	March 8, 2008	Kitt Peak	Spacewatch	·	470 m	MPC · JPL
745418	2011 BN_{68}	—	January 28, 2011	Mount Lemmon	Mount Lemmon Survey	GEF	830 m	MPC · JPL
745419	2011 BT_{72}	—	February 5, 2011	Haleakala	Pan-STARRS 1	·	1.1 km	MPC · JPL
745420	2011 BU_{73}	—	February 25, 2011	Mount Lemmon	Mount Lemmon Survey	·	2.2 km	MPC · JPL
745421	2011 BX_{74}	—	January 26, 2011	Mount Lemmon	Mount Lemmon Survey	·	2.4 km	MPC · JPL
745422	2011 BE_{78}	—	January 29, 2011	Haleakala	Pan-STARRS 1	·	1.9 km	MPC · JPL
745423	2011 BF_{81}	—	December 8, 2010	Mount Lemmon	Mount Lemmon Survey	·	1.5 km	MPC · JPL
745424	2011 BT_{81}	—	November 8, 2009	Mount Lemmon	Mount Lemmon Survey	·	1.8 km	MPC · JPL
745425	2011 BJ_{90}	—	January 16, 2011	Mount Lemmon	Mount Lemmon Survey	·	2.3 km	MPC · JPL
745426	2011 BF_{92}	—	January 13, 2011	Kitt Peak	Spacewatch	·	1.4 km	MPC · JPL
745427	2011 BL_{92}	—	January 13, 2011	Kitt Peak	Spacewatch	V	470 m	MPC · JPL
745428	2011 BE_{94}	—	December 5, 2010	Mount Lemmon	Mount Lemmon Survey	·	820 m	MPC · JPL
745429	2011 BH_{94}	—	January 23, 2011	Mount Lemmon	Mount Lemmon Survey	·	520 m	MPC · JPL
745430	2011 BL_{95}	—	January 29, 2011	Mount Lemmon	Mount Lemmon Survey	·	1.1 km	MPC · JPL
745431	2011 BF_{99}	—	December 9, 2010	Mount Lemmon	Mount Lemmon Survey	EOS	1.7 km	MPC · JPL
745432	2011 BJ_{102}	—	March 4, 2008	Mount Lemmon	Mount Lemmon Survey	·	560 m	MPC · JPL
745433	2011 BD_{107}	—	January 15, 2011	Mount Lemmon	Mount Lemmon Survey	·	2.4 km	MPC · JPL
745434	2011 BW_{108}	—	September 15, 2009	Kitt Peak	Spacewatch	V	420 m	MPC · JPL
745435	2011 BB_{110}	—	February 5, 2011	Haleakala	Pan-STARRS 1	·	2.0 km	MPC · JPL
745436	2011 BQ_{111}	—	March 2, 2006	Kitt Peak	Spacewatch	·	1.7 km	MPC · JPL
745437	2011 BX_{114}	—	January 23, 2011	Mount Lemmon	Mount Lemmon Survey	·	2.1 km	MPC · JPL
745438	2011 BC_{119}	—	January 15, 2011	Mount Lemmon	Mount Lemmon Survey	·	1.9 km	MPC · JPL
745439	2011 BM_{119}	—	May 2, 2006	Catalina	CSS	·	3.1 km	MPC · JPL
745440	2011 BE_{122}	—	January 11, 2011	Kitt Peak	Spacewatch	·	1.8 km	MPC · JPL
745441	2011 BR_{124}	—	January 11, 2011	Kitt Peak	Spacewatch	·	730 m	MPC · JPL
745442	2011 BD_{127}	—	September 18, 2009	Kitt Peak	Spacewatch	AGN	910 m	MPC · JPL
745443	2011 BE_{129}	—	January 28, 2011	Mount Lemmon	Mount Lemmon Survey	·	990 m	MPC · JPL
745444	2011 BO_{129}	—	January 28, 2011	Mount Lemmon	Mount Lemmon Survey	·	1.6 km	MPC · JPL
745445	2011 BJ_{132}	—	January 28, 2011	Mount Lemmon	Mount Lemmon Survey	·	960 m	MPC · JPL
745446	2011 BV_{136}	—	January 9, 2011	Mount Lemmon	Mount Lemmon Survey	NYS	690 m	MPC · JPL
745447	2011 BK_{145}	—	January 29, 2011	Mount Lemmon	Mount Lemmon Survey	·	2.0 km	MPC · JPL
745448	2011 BE_{146}	—	January 29, 2011	Mount Lemmon	Mount Lemmon Survey	NYS	740 m	MPC · JPL
745449	2011 BO_{149}	—	January 29, 2011	Mount Lemmon	Mount Lemmon Survey	·	1.0 km	MPC · JPL
745450	2011 BQ_{153}	—	August 29, 2005	Palomar	NEAT	·	2.1 km	MPC · JPL
745451	2011 BS_{165}	—	January 27, 2011	Mount Lemmon	Mount Lemmon Survey	·	2.6 km	MPC · JPL
745452	2011 BO_{167}	—	March 6, 2011	Mount Lemmon	Mount Lemmon Survey	·	860 m	MPC · JPL
745453	2011 BG_{169}	—	February 5, 2011	Catalina	CSS	·	860 m	MPC · JPL
745454	2011 BT_{170}	—	January 29, 2011	Mount Lemmon	Mount Lemmon Survey	·	3.5 km	MPC · JPL
745455	2011 BU_{170}	—	February 25, 2011	Mount Lemmon	Mount Lemmon Survey	PHO	820 m	MPC · JPL
745456	2011 BY_{170}	—	January 30, 2011	Kitt Peak	Spacewatch	·	2.7 km	MPC · JPL
745457	2011 BL_{171}	—	January 30, 2011	Kitt Peak	Spacewatch	·	820 m	MPC · JPL
745458	2011 BO_{171}	—	January 30, 2011	Mount Lemmon	Mount Lemmon Survey	·	2.6 km	MPC · JPL
745459	2011 BP_{171}	—	January 27, 2011	Mount Lemmon	Mount Lemmon Survey	PHO	1.1 km	MPC · JPL
745460	2011 BV_{171}	—	January 27, 2011	Mount Lemmon	Mount Lemmon Survey	·	790 m	MPC · JPL
745461	2011 BW_{171}	—	January 29, 2011	Mount Lemmon	Mount Lemmon Survey	·	2.2 km	MPC · JPL
745462	2011 BB_{172}	—	January 30, 2011	Mount Lemmon	Mount Lemmon Survey	·	2.3 km	MPC · JPL
745463	2011 BR_{172}	—	January 23, 2006	Kitt Peak	Spacewatch	·	1.8 km	MPC · JPL
745464	2011 BE_{173}	—	January 25, 2011	Mount Lemmon	Mount Lemmon Survey	·	2.3 km	MPC · JPL
745465	2011 BT_{174}	—	April 27, 2012	Haleakala	Pan-STARRS 1	V	500 m	MPC · JPL
745466	2011 BW_{174}	—	February 8, 2011	Mount Lemmon	Mount Lemmon Survey	·	800 m	MPC · JPL
745467	2011 BL_{175}	—	April 27, 2012	Haleakala	Pan-STARRS 1	·	2.3 km	MPC · JPL
745468	2011 BN_{175}	—	February 8, 2011	Mount Lemmon	Mount Lemmon Survey	LIX	2.5 km	MPC · JPL
745469	2011 BC_{176}	—	February 8, 2011	Mount Lemmon	Mount Lemmon Survey	·	710 m	MPC · JPL
745470	2011 BV_{176}	—	April 18, 2012	Kitt Peak	Spacewatch	·	1.3 km	MPC · JPL
745471	2011 BF_{177}	—	January 28, 2011	Mount Lemmon	Mount Lemmon Survey	·	2.8 km	MPC · JPL
745472	2011 BU_{177}	—	February 7, 2011	Mount Lemmon	Mount Lemmon Survey	·	790 m	MPC · JPL
745473	2011 BZ_{177}	—	February 12, 2011	Mount Lemmon	Mount Lemmon Survey	EOS	1.3 km	MPC · JPL
745474	2011 BJ_{178}	—	May 20, 2012	Mount Lemmon	Mount Lemmon Survey	·	1.0 km	MPC · JPL
745475	2011 BO_{181}	—	October 17, 2014	Mount Lemmon	Mount Lemmon Survey	EOS	1.5 km	MPC · JPL
745476	2011 BS_{181}	—	February 25, 2011	Mount Lemmon	Mount Lemmon Survey	·	520 m	MPC · JPL
745477	2011 BW_{181}	—	January 27, 2011	Mount Lemmon	Mount Lemmon Survey	MAS	590 m	MPC · JPL
745478	2011 BE_{182}	—	June 19, 2013	Haleakala	Pan-STARRS 1	·	2.0 km	MPC · JPL
745479	2011 BO_{182}	—	October 15, 2014	Kitt Peak	Spacewatch	·	2.0 km	MPC · JPL
745480	2011 BQ_{182}	—	February 5, 2011	Haleakala	Pan-STARRS 1	·	2.2 km	MPC · JPL
745481	2011 BK_{184}	—	February 8, 2011	Mount Lemmon	Mount Lemmon Survey	EOS	1.6 km	MPC · JPL
745482	2011 BN_{187}	—	February 8, 2011	Mount Lemmon	Mount Lemmon Survey	·	2.8 km	MPC · JPL
745483	2011 BX_{196}	—	January 16, 2011	Mount Lemmon	Mount Lemmon Survey	·	530 m	MPC · JPL
745484	2011 BH_{202}	—	January 28, 2011	Mount Lemmon	Mount Lemmon Survey	·	3.1 km	MPC · JPL
745485	2011 BF_{204}	—	January 30, 2011	Haleakala	Pan-STARRS 1	·	1.6 km	MPC · JPL
745486	2011 CV_{1}	—	January 26, 2000	Kitt Peak	Spacewatch	H	470 m	MPC · JPL
745487	2011 CY_{5}	—	January 13, 2011	Kitt Peak	Spacewatch	·	2.6 km	MPC · JPL
745488	2011 CK_{6}	—	September 28, 2003	Kitt Peak	Spacewatch	·	2.7 km	MPC · JPL
745489	2011 CY_{12}	—	February 5, 2011	Mount Lemmon	Mount Lemmon Survey	·	870 m	MPC · JPL
745490	2011 CF_{14}	—	January 14, 2011	Kitt Peak	Spacewatch	·	1.9 km	MPC · JPL
745491	2011 CH_{15}	—	February 2, 2011	Kitt Peak	Spacewatch	·	1.7 km	MPC · JPL
745492 Saanich	2011 CH_{21}	Saanich	August 29, 2003	Mauna Kea	D. D. Balam, K. Perrett	·	1.4 km	MPC · JPL
745493	2011 CU_{24}	—	February 3, 2011	Piszkés-tető	K. Sárneczky, Z. Kuli	·	1.8 km	MPC · JPL
745494	2011 CY_{30}	—	January 12, 2011	Kitt Peak	Spacewatch	·	620 m	MPC · JPL
745495	2011 CZ_{39}	—	January 28, 2011	Catalina	CSS	H	540 m	MPC · JPL
745496	2011 CN_{44}	—	January 30, 2011	Mount Lemmon	Mount Lemmon Survey	·	1.5 km	MPC · JPL
745497	2011 CM_{45}	—	January 30, 2011	Mount Lemmon	Mount Lemmon Survey	·	850 m	MPC · JPL
745498	2011 CU_{50}	—	August 17, 2006	Palomar	NEAT	·	810 m	MPC · JPL
745499	2011 CG_{51}	—	February 7, 2011	Kitt Peak	Spacewatch	·	2.2 km	MPC · JPL
745500	2011 CD_{55}	—	February 8, 2011	Mount Lemmon	Mount Lemmon Survey	·	2.7 km	MPC · JPL

== 745501–745600 ==
back to top

Designation			Discovery			Properties		Ref
Permanent	Provisional	Named after	Date	Site	Discoverer(s)	Category	Diam.	Ref
745501	2011 CH_{55}	—	October 18, 2009	Mount Lemmon	Mount Lemmon Survey	·	1.2 km	MPC · JPL
745502	2011 CU_{57}	—	February 8, 2011	Mount Lemmon	Mount Lemmon Survey	·	920 m	MPC · JPL
745503	2011 CY_{63}	—	February 10, 2011	Mount Lemmon	Mount Lemmon Survey	·	1.2 km	MPC · JPL
745504	2011 CD_{64}	—	February 10, 2011	Mount Lemmon	Mount Lemmon Survey	·	740 m	MPC · JPL
745505	2011 CG_{68}	—	December 8, 2010	Mount Lemmon	Mount Lemmon Survey	·	620 m	MPC · JPL
745506	2011 CQ_{69}	—	April 27, 2006	Catalina	CSS	·	2.7 km	MPC · JPL
745507	2011 CS_{69}	—	February 7, 2011	Dauban	C. Rinner, Kugel, F.	PHO	760 m	MPC · JPL
745508	2011 CF_{72}	—	November 15, 2010	Mount Lemmon	Mount Lemmon Survey	·	2.2 km	MPC · JPL
745509	2011 CK_{73}	—	April 20, 2006	Kitt Peak	Spacewatch	·	2.7 km	MPC · JPL
745510	2011 CZ_{78}	—	February 11, 2011	Mayhill-ISON	L. Elenin	·	2.5 km	MPC · JPL
745511	2011 CG_{80}	—	February 5, 2011	Haleakala	Pan-STARRS 1	·	1.2 km	MPC · JPL
745512	2011 CL_{83}	—	March 1, 2011	Mount Lemmon	Mount Lemmon Survey	·	2.4 km	MPC · JPL
745513	2011 CE_{84}	—	February 26, 2011	Mount Lemmon	Mount Lemmon Survey	·	1.7 km	MPC · JPL
745514	2011 CE_{85}	—	May 2, 2006	Kitt Peak	Spacewatch	THB	1.9 km	MPC · JPL
745515	2011 CH_{85}	—	February 12, 2011	Mount Lemmon	Mount Lemmon Survey	·	930 m	MPC · JPL
745516	2011 CH_{86}	—	November 27, 2006	Kitt Peak	Spacewatch	NYS	750 m	MPC · JPL
745517	2011 CL_{87}	—	February 5, 2011	Catalina	CSS	·	1.5 km	MPC · JPL
745518	2011 CD_{89}	—	February 5, 2011	Catalina	CSS	PHO	730 m	MPC · JPL
745519	2011 CL_{89}	—	February 1, 2011	Kitt Peak	Spacewatch	·	2.4 km	MPC · JPL
745520	2011 CW_{90}	—	February 12, 2011	Mount Lemmon	Mount Lemmon Survey	·	1.7 km	MPC · JPL
745521	2011 CY_{91}	—	February 4, 2000	Kitt Peak	Spacewatch	·	750 m	MPC · JPL
745522	2011 CL_{92}	—	February 5, 2011	Haleakala	Pan-STARRS 1	·	810 m	MPC · JPL
745523	2011 CB_{97}	—	February 5, 2011	Haleakala	Pan-STARRS 1	·	1.4 km	MPC · JPL
745524	2011 CZ_{97}	—	February 5, 2011	Haleakala	Pan-STARRS 1	EOS	1.4 km	MPC · JPL
745525	2011 CM_{105}	—	January 28, 2011	Kitt Peak	Spacewatch	·	790 m	MPC · JPL
745526	2011 CC_{106}	—	February 12, 2011	Mount Lemmon	Mount Lemmon Survey	MAS	490 m	MPC · JPL
745527	2011 CJ_{111}	—	February 26, 2011	Mount Lemmon	Mount Lemmon Survey	·	770 m	MPC · JPL
745528	2011 CE_{114}	—	February 25, 2011	Mount Lemmon	Mount Lemmon Survey	·	2.7 km	MPC · JPL
745529	2011 CD_{115}	—	August 25, 2005	Palomar	NEAT	·	1.1 km	MPC · JPL
745530	2011 CX_{118}	—	February 10, 2011	Mount Lemmon	Mount Lemmon Survey	·	780 m	MPC · JPL
745531	2011 CY_{121}	—	September 3, 2013	ASC-Kislovodsk	Nevski, V.	·	1.7 km	MPC · JPL
745532	2011 CQ_{122}	—	February 7, 2011	Mount Lemmon	Mount Lemmon Survey	THM	2.0 km	MPC · JPL
745533	2011 CR_{122}	—	October 16, 2013	Mount Lemmon	Mount Lemmon Survey	·	1.1 km	MPC · JPL
745534	2011 CX_{122}	—	February 17, 2017	Haleakala	Pan-STARRS 1	·	3.0 km	MPC · JPL
745535	2011 CG_{123}	—	February 9, 2011	Mount Lemmon	Mount Lemmon Survey	TIR	2.5 km	MPC · JPL
745536	2011 CS_{123}	—	February 10, 2011	Catalina	CSS	EUP	2.8 km	MPC · JPL
745537	2011 CR_{124}	—	March 24, 2015	Haleakala	Pan-STARRS 1	·	1.1 km	MPC · JPL
745538	2011 CU_{124}	—	October 11, 2004	Kitt Peak	Deep Ecliptic Survey	·	1.3 km	MPC · JPL
745539	2011 CO_{126}	—	February 11, 2011	Mount Lemmon	Mount Lemmon Survey	·	800 m	MPC · JPL
745540	2011 CM_{128}	—	February 8, 2011	Mount Lemmon	Mount Lemmon Survey	·	1.1 km	MPC · JPL
745541	2011 CX_{128}	—	February 3, 2011	Piszkés-tető	K. Sárneczky, Z. Kuli	·	1.5 km	MPC · JPL
745542	2011 CN_{130}	—	February 8, 2011	Mount Lemmon	Mount Lemmon Survey	V	510 m	MPC · JPL
745543	2011 CH_{131}	—	February 12, 2011	Mount Lemmon	Mount Lemmon Survey	·	2.2 km	MPC · JPL
745544	2011 CV_{133}	—	February 5, 2011	Haleakala	Pan-STARRS 1	·	600 m	MPC · JPL
745545	2011 CZ_{133}	—	February 5, 2011	Haleakala	Pan-STARRS 1	·	2.3 km	MPC · JPL
745546	2011 CN_{134}	—	February 10, 2011	Mount Lemmon	Mount Lemmon Survey	·	2.5 km	MPC · JPL
745547	2011 CZ_{145}	—	February 11, 2011	Mount Lemmon	Mount Lemmon Survey	·	680 m	MPC · JPL
745548	2011 CH_{146}	—	February 9, 2011	Mount Lemmon	Mount Lemmon Survey	·	1.7 km	MPC · JPL
745549	2011 CD_{151}	—	February 5, 2011	Haleakala	Pan-STARRS 1	·	2.2 km	MPC · JPL
745550	2011 DK_{2}	—	January 28, 2011	Kitt Peak	Spacewatch	·	1.5 km	MPC · JPL
745551	2011 DQ_{4}	—	January 24, 2011	Kitt Peak	Spacewatch	T_{j} (2.97)	3.2 km	MPC · JPL
745552	2011 DU_{5}	—	February 23, 2011	Kitt Peak	Spacewatch	NYS	840 m	MPC · JPL
745553	2011 DF_{7}	—	February 25, 2011	Mount Lemmon	Mount Lemmon Survey	VER	1.9 km	MPC · JPL
745554	2011 DA_{8}	—	December 21, 2006	Kitt Peak	L. H. Wasserman, M. W. Buie	·	1.0 km	MPC · JPL
745555	2011 DC_{8}	—	February 22, 2011	Kitt Peak	Spacewatch	NYS	970 m	MPC · JPL
745556	2011 DF_{8}	—	February 22, 2011	Kitt Peak	Spacewatch	·	2.2 km	MPC · JPL
745557	2011 DE_{10}	—	February 22, 2011	Kitt Peak	Spacewatch	TIR	2.6 km	MPC · JPL
745558	2011 DU_{11}	—	February 22, 2011	Kitt Peak	Spacewatch	PHO	920 m	MPC · JPL
745559	2011 DG_{18}	—	February 26, 2011	Kitt Peak	Spacewatch	·	1.1 km	MPC · JPL
745560	2011 DP_{18}	—	February 26, 2011	Kitt Peak	Spacewatch	·	530 m	MPC · JPL
745561	2011 DA_{21}	—	January 24, 2011	Kitt Peak	Spacewatch	·	1.0 km	MPC · JPL
745562	2011 DU_{27}	—	February 8, 2011	Mount Lemmon	Mount Lemmon Survey	·	2.3 km	MPC · JPL
745563	2011 DX_{29}	—	February 27, 2006	Kitt Peak	Spacewatch	·	1.3 km	MPC · JPL
745564	2011 DJ_{30}	—	August 27, 2009	Kitt Peak	Spacewatch	·	790 m	MPC · JPL
745565	2011 DK_{36}	—	January 29, 2011	Kitt Peak	Spacewatch	JUN	780 m	MPC · JPL
745566	2011 DW_{40}	—	January 28, 2011	Kitt Peak	Spacewatch	·	740 m	MPC · JPL
745567	2011 DT_{43}	—	December 21, 2006	Kitt Peak	L. H. Wasserman, M. W. Buie	MAS	570 m	MPC · JPL
745568	2011 DJ_{46}	—	January 29, 2011	Kitt Peak	Spacewatch	·	2.8 km	MPC · JPL
745569	2011 DC_{47}	—	January 13, 2000	Kitt Peak	Spacewatch	·	910 m	MPC · JPL
745570	2011 DD_{47}	—	February 26, 2011	Mount Lemmon	Mount Lemmon Survey	·	1.2 km	MPC · JPL
745571	2011 DO_{50}	—	February 25, 2011	Catalina	CSS	·	2.4 km	MPC · JPL
745572	2011 DZ_{50}	—	February 5, 2011	Catalina	CSS	·	2.3 km	MPC · JPL
745573	2011 DS_{53}	—	February 25, 2011	Kitt Peak	Spacewatch	·	1.1 km	MPC · JPL
745574	2011 DF_{54}	—	February 25, 2011	Mayhill-ISON	L. Elenin	PHO	860 m	MPC · JPL
745575	2011 DD_{58}	—	October 30, 2005	Sacramento Peak	SDSS Collaboration	·	900 m	MPC · JPL
745576	2011 ET	—	February 11, 2011	Mount Lemmon	Mount Lemmon Survey	·	950 m	MPC · JPL
745577	2011 EH_{3}	—	February 5, 2011	Mount Lemmon	Mount Lemmon Survey	·	660 m	MPC · JPL
745578	2011 EX_{3}	—	May 9, 2004	Kitt Peak	Spacewatch	·	920 m	MPC · JPL
745579	2011 EJ_{4}	—	March 1, 2011	Kitt Peak	Spacewatch	·	1.0 km	MPC · JPL
745580	2011 EG_{7}	—	January 28, 2011	Mount Lemmon	Mount Lemmon Survey	NYS	870 m	MPC · JPL
745581	2011 EB_{10}	—	March 3, 2011	Mount Lemmon	Mount Lemmon Survey	·	960 m	MPC · JPL
745582	2011 EG_{10}	—	March 3, 2011	Mount Lemmon	Mount Lemmon Survey	·	2.6 km	MPC · JPL
745583	2011 EZ_{12}	—	March 2, 2011	Kitt Peak	Spacewatch	·	500 m	MPC · JPL
745584	2011 EJ_{19}	—	March 4, 2011	Kitt Peak	Spacewatch	·	2.1 km	MPC · JPL
745585	2011 EH_{23}	—	March 4, 2011	Catalina	CSS	·	1.1 km	MPC · JPL
745586	2011 EZ_{26}	—	March 6, 2011	Mount Lemmon	Mount Lemmon Survey	·	830 m	MPC · JPL
745587	2011 EA_{36}	—	March 6, 2011	Kitt Peak	Spacewatch	·	720 m	MPC · JPL
745588	2011 EZ_{36}	—	March 2, 2011	Kitt Peak	Spacewatch	·	1.0 km	MPC · JPL
745589	2011 EW_{51}	—	March 9, 2011	Mount Lemmon	Mount Lemmon Survey	·	1.2 km	MPC · JPL
745590	2011 EE_{55}	—	March 11, 2011	Kitt Peak	Spacewatch	·	1.2 km	MPC · JPL
745591	2011 EY_{55}	—	February 13, 2004	Kitt Peak	Spacewatch	·	700 m	MPC · JPL
745592	2011 EG_{56}	—	March 12, 2011	Mount Lemmon	Mount Lemmon Survey	·	890 m	MPC · JPL
745593	2011 EJ_{58}	—	March 12, 2011	Mount Lemmon	Mount Lemmon Survey	·	2.2 km	MPC · JPL
745594	2011 EX_{61}	—	March 12, 2011	Mount Lemmon	Mount Lemmon Survey	EOS	1.5 km	MPC · JPL
745595	2011 ES_{65}	—	March 9, 2011	XuYi	PMO NEO Survey Program	·	2.3 km	MPC · JPL
745596	2011 EX_{66}	—	March 10, 2011	Kitt Peak	Spacewatch	·	1.7 km	MPC · JPL
745597	2011 EG_{71}	—	March 10, 2011	Kitt Peak	Spacewatch	(2076)	600 m	MPC · JPL
745598	2011 EO_{79}	—	February 26, 2011	Catalina	CSS	·	3.0 km	MPC · JPL
745599	2011 ES_{79}	—	March 10, 2011	Mount Lemmon	Mount Lemmon Survey	·	3.0 km	MPC · JPL
745600	2011 EM_{83}	—	February 23, 2011	Kitt Peak	Spacewatch	·	1.1 km	MPC · JPL

== 745601–745700 ==
back to top

Designation			Discovery			Properties		Ref
Permanent	Provisional	Named after	Date	Site	Discoverer(s)	Category	Diam.	Ref
745601	2011 EN_{83}	—	March 14, 2011	Mount Lemmon	Mount Lemmon Survey	H	440 m	MPC · JPL
745602	2011 EW_{88}	—	February 26, 2011	Mount Lemmon	Mount Lemmon Survey	·	870 m	MPC · JPL
745603	2011 EU_{89}	—	March 6, 2011	Mount Lemmon	Mount Lemmon Survey	·	1.7 km	MPC · JPL
745604	2011 EB_{92}	—	March 10, 2011	Kitt Peak	Spacewatch	NYS	1.0 km	MPC · JPL
745605	2011 EC_{92}	—	January 21, 2015	Haleakala	Pan-STARRS 1	·	1.1 km	MPC · JPL
745606	2011 EB_{93}	—	March 28, 2015	Haleakala	Pan-STARRS 1	·	880 m	MPC · JPL
745607	2011 EN_{93}	—	April 10, 2015	Mount Lemmon	Mount Lemmon Survey	·	950 m	MPC · JPL
745608	2011 EX_{93}	—	September 24, 2014	Kitt Peak	Spacewatch	EOS	1.6 km	MPC · JPL
745609	2011 EF_{94}	—	March 13, 2011	Kitt Peak	Spacewatch	·	870 m	MPC · JPL
745610	2011 EW_{94}	—	March 2, 2011	Mount Lemmon	Mount Lemmon Survey	·	2.2 km	MPC · JPL
745611	2011 EP_{95}	—	November 26, 2014	Haleakala	Pan-STARRS 1	·	1.7 km	MPC · JPL
745612	2011 EQ_{99}	—	September 4, 2013	Mount Lemmon	Mount Lemmon Survey	·	2.9 km	MPC · JPL
745613	2011 EO_{104}	—	March 14, 2011	Mount Lemmon	Mount Lemmon Survey	·	570 m	MPC · JPL
745614	2011 EN_{105}	—	March 6, 2011	Kitt Peak	Spacewatch	·	2.4 km	MPC · JPL
745615	2011 EU_{111}	—	March 6, 2011	Kitt Peak	Spacewatch	·	890 m	MPC · JPL
745616	2011 ED_{113}	—	March 13, 2011	Kitt Peak	Spacewatch	·	2.3 km	MPC · JPL
745617	2011 FJ_{7}	—	March 24, 2011	Catalina	CSS	·	2.7 km	MPC · JPL
745618	2011 FP_{8}	—	March 26, 2011	Kitt Peak	Spacewatch	·	800 m	MPC · JPL
745619	2011 FR_{15}	—	March 28, 2011	Mount Lemmon	Mount Lemmon Survey	·	1.9 km	MPC · JPL
745620	2011 FL_{25}	—	August 10, 2007	Kitt Peak	Spacewatch	·	2.2 km	MPC · JPL
745621	2011 FV_{33}	—	March 28, 2011	Mount Lemmon	Mount Lemmon Survey	·	770 m	MPC · JPL
745622	2011 FF_{37}	—	February 4, 2005	Kitt Peak	Spacewatch	THM	1.7 km	MPC · JPL
745623	2011 FH_{38}	—	March 30, 2011	Mount Lemmon	Mount Lemmon Survey	·	1.5 km	MPC · JPL
745624	2011 FL_{43}	—	March 27, 2011	Mount Lemmon	Mount Lemmon Survey	·	2.3 km	MPC · JPL
745625	2011 FB_{44}	—	January 17, 2005	Kitt Peak	Spacewatch	THM	2.0 km	MPC · JPL
745626	2011 FT_{45}	—	March 29, 2011	Kitt Peak	Spacewatch	·	560 m	MPC · JPL
745627	2011 FX_{45}	—	March 29, 2011	Kitt Peak	Spacewatch	·	820 m	MPC · JPL
745628	2011 FT_{50}	—	March 30, 2011	Mount Lemmon	Mount Lemmon Survey	·	780 m	MPC · JPL
745629	2011 FZ_{64}	—	March 30, 2011	Mount Lemmon	Mount Lemmon Survey	·	2.4 km	MPC · JPL
745630	2011 FV_{67}	—	March 27, 2011	Mount Lemmon	Mount Lemmon Survey	·	1.8 km	MPC · JPL
745631	2011 FS_{69}	—	September 7, 2008	Mount Lemmon	Mount Lemmon Survey	·	1.0 km	MPC · JPL
745632	2011 FX_{70}	—	March 29, 2011	Mount Lemmon	Mount Lemmon Survey	MAS	580 m	MPC · JPL
745633	2011 FB_{74}	—	December 21, 2006	Mount Lemmon	Mount Lemmon Survey	MAS	510 m	MPC · JPL
745634	2011 FN_{75}	—	September 21, 2008	Mount Lemmon	Mount Lemmon Survey	EOS	1.5 km	MPC · JPL
745635	2011 FL_{80}	—	February 25, 2011	Kitt Peak	Spacewatch	·	2.4 km	MPC · JPL
745636	2011 FD_{82}	—	February 11, 2011	Mount Lemmon	Mount Lemmon Survey	·	2.7 km	MPC · JPL
745637	2011 FS_{85}	—	March 28, 2011	Kitt Peak	Spacewatch	H	430 m	MPC · JPL
745638	2011 FF_{88}	—	March 14, 2011	Mount Lemmon	Mount Lemmon Survey	·	840 m	MPC · JPL
745639	2011 FQ_{91}	—	March 28, 2011	Mount Lemmon	Mount Lemmon Survey	·	860 m	MPC · JPL
745640	2011 FU_{91}	—	October 8, 2008	Mount Lemmon	Mount Lemmon Survey	·	2.4 km	MPC · JPL
745641	2011 FD_{98}	—	March 4, 2011	Catalina	CSS	·	890 m	MPC · JPL
745642	2011 FO_{99}	—	March 30, 2011	Mount Lemmon	Mount Lemmon Survey	·	1.9 km	MPC · JPL
745643	2011 FJ_{100}	—	December 13, 2010	Mount Lemmon	Mount Lemmon Survey	·	1.8 km	MPC · JPL
745644	2011 FJ_{103}	—	March 6, 2011	Mount Lemmon	Mount Lemmon Survey	·	2.1 km	MPC · JPL
745645	2011 FY_{104}	—	November 9, 2009	Mount Lemmon	Mount Lemmon Survey	·	2.6 km	MPC · JPL
745646	2011 FP_{105}	—	April 2, 2011	Haleakala	Pan-STARRS 1	ERI	1.2 km	MPC · JPL
745647	2011 FT_{115}	—	April 2, 2011	Mount Lemmon	Mount Lemmon Survey	·	2.2 km	MPC · JPL
745648	2011 FA_{119}	—	January 29, 2007	Kitt Peak	Spacewatch	·	1.0 km	MPC · JPL
745649	2011 FX_{122}	—	October 27, 2008	Mount Lemmon	Mount Lemmon Survey	·	2.3 km	MPC · JPL
745650	2011 FD_{132}	—	March 6, 2011	Kitt Peak	Spacewatch	·	780 m	MPC · JPL
745651	2011 FB_{133}	—	September 6, 2008	Mount Lemmon	Mount Lemmon Survey	·	1.5 km	MPC · JPL
745652	2011 FJ_{134}	—	March 5, 2011	Mount Lemmon	Mount Lemmon Survey	·	1.6 km	MPC · JPL
745653	2011 FW_{134}	—	February 10, 2011	Mount Lemmon	Mount Lemmon Survey	·	840 m	MPC · JPL
745654	2011 FW_{135}	—	March 1, 2011	Mount Lemmon	Mount Lemmon Survey	·	980 m	MPC · JPL
745655	2011 FN_{137}	—	March 29, 2011	Mount Lemmon	Mount Lemmon Survey	·	600 m	MPC · JPL
745656	2011 FX_{139}	—	March 2, 2011	Mount Lemmon	Mount Lemmon Survey	·	2.2 km	MPC · JPL
745657	2011 FT_{143}	—	March 9, 2011	Mount Lemmon	Mount Lemmon Survey	·	1.1 km	MPC · JPL
745658	2011 FX_{144}	—	January 27, 2011	Kitt Peak	Spacewatch	·	2.0 km	MPC · JPL
745659	2011 FD_{145}	—	March 26, 2011	Haleakala	Pan-STARRS 1	·	1.2 km	MPC · JPL
745660	2011 FQ_{145}	—	November 20, 2006	Catalina	CSS	·	940 m	MPC · JPL
745661	2011 FU_{152}	—	September 29, 2009	Mount Lemmon	Mount Lemmon Survey	H	440 m	MPC · JPL
745662	2011 FT_{155}	—	March 25, 2011	Haleakala	Pan-STARRS 1	·	2.8 km	MPC · JPL
745663	2011 FP_{160}	—	April 1, 2011	Mount Lemmon	Mount Lemmon Survey	·	1.0 km	MPC · JPL
745664	2011 FU_{160}	—	December 30, 2015	Mount Lemmon	Mount Lemmon Survey	·	2.2 km	MPC · JPL
745665	2011 FW_{161}	—	September 18, 2012	Mount Lemmon	Mount Lemmon Survey	H	480 m	MPC · JPL
745666	2011 FW_{163}	—	September 28, 2003	Socorro	LINEAR	·	1.9 km	MPC · JPL
745667	2011 FD_{164}	—	March 31, 2011	Haleakala	Pan-STARRS 1	·	1.1 km	MPC · JPL
745668	2011 FY_{164}	—	April 19, 2017	Haleakala	Pan-STARRS 1	TIR	2.2 km	MPC · JPL
745669	2011 FU_{165}	—	January 16, 2016	Haleakala	Pan-STARRS 1	·	2.0 km	MPC · JPL
745670	2011 FQ_{166}	—	August 12, 2013	Haleakala	Pan-STARRS 1	·	2.8 km	MPC · JPL
745671	2011 FR_{166}	—	February 5, 2016	Haleakala	Pan-STARRS 1	·	1.8 km	MPC · JPL
745672	2011 FR_{167}	—	March 28, 2011	Mount Lemmon	Mount Lemmon Survey	·	570 m	MPC · JPL
745673	2011 GY_{5}	—	April 2, 2011	Mount Lemmon	Mount Lemmon Survey	TEL	1.1 km	MPC · JPL
745674	2011 GZ_{11}	—	November 25, 2009	Mount Lemmon	Mount Lemmon Survey	·	1.0 km	MPC · JPL
745675	2011 GV_{15}	—	April 1, 2011	Mount Lemmon	Mount Lemmon Survey	·	1.1 km	MPC · JPL
745676	2011 GG_{19}	—	January 27, 2007	Kitt Peak	Spacewatch	·	800 m	MPC · JPL
745677	2011 GD_{26}	—	March 11, 2011	Mount Lemmon	Mount Lemmon Survey	·	2.3 km	MPC · JPL
745678	2011 GB_{29}	—	April 1, 2011	Kitt Peak	Spacewatch	·	1.1 km	MPC · JPL
745679	2011 GE_{30}	—	March 13, 2011	Kitt Peak	Spacewatch	·	920 m	MPC · JPL
745680	2011 GC_{31}	—	February 26, 2007	Mount Lemmon	Mount Lemmon Survey	·	840 m	MPC · JPL
745681	2011 GH_{34}	—	April 3, 2011	Haleakala	Pan-STARRS 1	·	1.7 km	MPC · JPL
745682	2011 GV_{37}	—	April 4, 2011	Mount Lemmon	Mount Lemmon Survey	·	960 m	MPC · JPL
745683	2011 GC_{43}	—	February 25, 2011	Kitt Peak	Spacewatch	·	930 m	MPC · JPL
745684	2011 GZ_{44}	—	February 25, 2011	Kitt Peak	Spacewatch	·	650 m	MPC · JPL
745685	2011 GO_{57}	—	March 27, 2011	Mount Lemmon	Mount Lemmon Survey	·	1.5 km	MPC · JPL
745686	2011 GJ_{63}	—	March 10, 2011	Kitt Peak	Spacewatch	·	980 m	MPC · JPL
745687	2011 GY_{67}	—	March 14, 2011	Catalina	CSS	PHO	850 m	MPC · JPL
745688	2011 GS_{68}	—	April 6, 2011	Mount Lemmon	Mount Lemmon Survey	·	860 m	MPC · JPL
745689	2011 GH_{71}	—	April 2, 2011	Haleakala	Pan-STARRS 1	H	550 m	MPC · JPL
745690	2011 GJ_{72}	—	March 26, 2011	Mount Lemmon	Mount Lemmon Survey	·	900 m	MPC · JPL
745691	2011 GP_{74}	—	March 28, 2011	Kitt Peak	Spacewatch	·	1.1 km	MPC · JPL
745692	2011 GL_{78}	—	April 3, 2011	Siding Spring	SSS	PHO	1.1 km	MPC · JPL
745693	2011 GY_{78}	—	April 5, 2011	Kitt Peak	Spacewatch	HYG	2.5 km	MPC · JPL
745694	2011 GW_{80}	—	April 13, 2011	Mount Lemmon	Mount Lemmon Survey	·	2.8 km	MPC · JPL
745695	2011 GF_{82}	—	April 13, 2011	Haleakala	Pan-STARRS 1	·	1.1 km	MPC · JPL
745696	2011 GC_{83}	—	March 27, 2011	Mount Lemmon	Mount Lemmon Survey	·	2.5 km	MPC · JPL
745697	2011 GO_{88}	—	March 25, 2011	Kitt Peak	Spacewatch	URS	2.8 km	MPC · JPL
745698	2011 GZ_{89}	—	April 2, 2011	Kitt Peak	Spacewatch	·	2.2 km	MPC · JPL
745699	2011 GV_{90}	—	April 2, 2011	Mount Lemmon	Mount Lemmon Survey	·	980 m	MPC · JPL
745700	2011 GT_{91}	—	April 12, 2011	Mount Lemmon	Mount Lemmon Survey	·	1.2 km	MPC · JPL

== 745701–745800 ==
back to top

Designation			Discovery			Properties		Ref
Permanent	Provisional	Named after	Date	Site	Discoverer(s)	Category	Diam.	Ref
745701	2011 GA_{92}	—	October 15, 2013	Mount Lemmon	Mount Lemmon Survey	·	3.0 km	MPC · JPL
745702	2011 GX_{92}	—	August 17, 2012	Haleakala	Pan-STARRS 1	TIR	2.0 km	MPC · JPL
745703	2011 GL_{93}	—	April 2, 2011	Mount Lemmon	Mount Lemmon Survey	·	970 m	MPC · JPL
745704	2011 GT_{93}	—	April 11, 2011	Mount Lemmon	Mount Lemmon Survey	·	2.9 km	MPC · JPL
745705	2011 GO_{94}	—	April 3, 2011	Haleakala	Pan-STARRS 1	·	890 m	MPC · JPL
745706	2011 GS_{95}	—	April 5, 2011	Kitt Peak	Spacewatch	·	850 m	MPC · JPL
745707	2011 GX_{95}	—	October 3, 2013	Haleakala	Pan-STARRS 1	·	2.9 km	MPC · JPL
745708	2011 GB_{96}	—	March 24, 2015	Kitt Peak	Spacewatch	·	1.1 km	MPC · JPL
745709	2011 GF_{96}	—	April 10, 2015	Mount Lemmon	Mount Lemmon Survey	·	1.1 km	MPC · JPL
745710	2011 GK_{96}	—	April 13, 2011	Kitt Peak	Spacewatch	·	1.6 km	MPC · JPL
745711	2011 GU_{96}	—	April 18, 2015	Mount Lemmon	Mount Lemmon Survey	·	1.3 km	MPC · JPL
745712	2011 GK_{98}	—	February 14, 2016	Haleakala	Pan-STARRS 1	·	2.7 km	MPC · JPL
745713	2011 GG_{99}	—	April 2, 2011	Haleakala	Pan-STARRS 1	·	2.3 km	MPC · JPL
745714	2011 GY_{100}	—	April 3, 2011	Haleakala	Pan-STARRS 1	EOS	1.3 km	MPC · JPL
745715	2011 GG_{101}	—	April 2, 2011	Kitt Peak	Spacewatch	·	660 m	MPC · JPL
745716	2011 GE_{102}	—	April 1, 2011	Haleakala	Pan-STARRS 1	·	990 m	MPC · JPL
745717	2011 GQ_{103}	—	April 5, 2011	Mount Lemmon	Mount Lemmon Survey	·	2.4 km	MPC · JPL
745718	2011 GS_{103}	—	April 5, 2011	Kitt Peak	Spacewatch	·	2.6 km	MPC · JPL
745719	2011 GQ_{108}	—	April 12, 2011	Mount Lemmon	Mount Lemmon Survey	·	2.7 km	MPC · JPL
745720	2011 HD	—	April 21, 2011	Westfield	R. Holmes	PHO	830 m	MPC · JPL
745721	2011 HT_{3}	—	March 28, 2011	Kitt Peak	Spacewatch	·	1.0 km	MPC · JPL
745722	2011 HF_{5}	—	April 25, 2011	Mount Lemmon	Mount Lemmon Survey	EUP	2.6 km	MPC · JPL
745723	2011 HU_{7}	—	April 11, 2011	Mount Lemmon	Mount Lemmon Survey	·	2.9 km	MPC · JPL
745724	2011 HM_{8}	—	April 21, 2011	Haleakala	Pan-STARRS 1	·	910 m	MPC · JPL
745725	2011 HF_{9}	—	April 12, 2011	Catalina	CSS	PHO	710 m	MPC · JPL
745726	2011 HW_{10}	—	April 22, 2011	Kitt Peak	Spacewatch	·	2.1 km	MPC · JPL
745727	2011 HC_{11}	—	March 13, 2011	Kitt Peak	Spacewatch	·	2.4 km	MPC · JPL
745728	2011 HE_{11}	—	March 2, 2000	Kitt Peak	Spacewatch	MAS	620 m	MPC · JPL
745729	2011 HC_{12}	—	April 22, 2011	Kitt Peak	Spacewatch	TIR	2.4 km	MPC · JPL
745730	2011 HG_{16}	—	April 24, 2011	Mount Lemmon	Mount Lemmon Survey	EOS	1.5 km	MPC · JPL
745731	2011 HK_{23}	—	March 29, 2011	Kitt Peak	Spacewatch	·	960 m	MPC · JPL
745732	2011 HN_{31}	—	March 26, 2011	Kitt Peak	Spacewatch	·	2.3 km	MPC · JPL
745733	2011 HZ_{33}	—	April 22, 2011	Kitt Peak	Spacewatch	·	2.9 km	MPC · JPL
745734	2011 HW_{35}	—	April 15, 2011	Haleakala	Pan-STARRS 1	·	960 m	MPC · JPL
745735	2011 HH_{37}	—	April 7, 2011	Kitt Peak	Spacewatch	·	2.3 km	MPC · JPL
745736	2011 HF_{41}	—	April 26, 2011	Mount Lemmon	Mount Lemmon Survey	·	2.6 km	MPC · JPL
745737	2011 HW_{44}	—	April 27, 2011	Haleakala	Pan-STARRS 1	·	2.7 km	MPC · JPL
745738	2011 HT_{47}	—	March 29, 2011	Kitt Peak	Spacewatch	·	1.1 km	MPC · JPL
745739	2011 HT_{48}	—	April 28, 2011	Haleakala	Pan-STARRS 1	V	650 m	MPC · JPL
745740	2011 HQ_{49}	—	April 30, 2011	Kitt Peak	Spacewatch	·	2.8 km	MPC · JPL
745741	2011 HB_{52}	—	April 30, 2011	Haleakala	Pan-STARRS 1	·	890 m	MPC · JPL
745742	2011 HX_{53}	—	April 21, 2011	Haleakala	Pan-STARRS 1	·	2.0 km	MPC · JPL
745743	2011 HR_{57}	—	February 6, 2007	Kitt Peak	Spacewatch	·	1.0 km	MPC · JPL
745744	2011 HA_{70}	—	April 24, 2011	Mount Lemmon	Mount Lemmon Survey	·	2.3 km	MPC · JPL
745745	2011 HC_{70}	—	April 24, 2011	Mount Lemmon	Mount Lemmon Survey	·	2.4 km	MPC · JPL
745746	2011 HF_{70}	—	September 21, 2008	Mount Lemmon	Mount Lemmon Survey	NYS	970 m	MPC · JPL
745747	2011 HQ_{70}	—	January 27, 2007	Kitt Peak	Spacewatch	MAS	510 m	MPC · JPL
745748	2011 HO_{73}	—	April 27, 2011	Kitt Peak	Spacewatch	·	910 m	MPC · JPL
745749	2011 HC_{77}	—	April 24, 2011	Kitt Peak	Spacewatch	PHO	870 m	MPC · JPL
745750	2011 HR_{78}	—	April 27, 2011	Kitt Peak	Spacewatch	·	2.5 km	MPC · JPL
745751	2011 HB_{88}	—	April 28, 2011	Kitt Peak	Spacewatch	(31811)	2.7 km	MPC · JPL
745752	2011 HA_{89}	—	April 28, 2011	Haleakala	Pan-STARRS 1	·	2.4 km	MPC · JPL
745753	2011 HE_{93}	—	April 26, 2011	Mount Lemmon	Mount Lemmon Survey	V	540 m	MPC · JPL
745754	2011 HE_{97}	—	April 28, 2011	Kitt Peak	Spacewatch	·	2.5 km	MPC · JPL
745755	2011 HM_{98}	—	April 29, 2011	Kitt Peak	Spacewatch	RAF	740 m	MPC · JPL
745756	2011 HL_{101}	—	April 19, 2006	Kitt Peak	Spacewatch	·	1.7 km	MPC · JPL
745757	2011 HP_{104}	—	August 12, 2012	Haleakala	Pan-STARRS 1	·	3.1 km	MPC · JPL
745758	2011 HR_{104}	—	April 28, 2011	Kitt Peak	Spacewatch	·	2.7 km	MPC · JPL
745759	2011 HY_{104}	—	April 4, 2014	Haleakala	Pan-STARRS 1	·	860 m	MPC · JPL
745760	2011 HR_{106}	—	April 13, 2011	Mount Lemmon	Mount Lemmon Survey	·	2.7 km	MPC · JPL
745761	2011 HC_{107}	—	April 17, 2015	Mount Lemmon	Mount Lemmon Survey	·	1.1 km	MPC · JPL
745762	2011 HD_{107}	—	October 28, 2013	Mount Lemmon	Mount Lemmon Survey	HYG	2.2 km	MPC · JPL
745763	2011 HF_{107}	—	October 3, 2013	Haleakala	Pan-STARRS 1	·	2.7 km	MPC · JPL
745764	2011 HH_{107}	—	September 4, 2013	Mount Lemmon	Mount Lemmon Survey	·	2.3 km	MPC · JPL
745765	2011 HO_{107}	—	December 12, 2014	Haleakala	Pan-STARRS 1	VER	2.4 km	MPC · JPL
745766	2011 HP_{107}	—	July 8, 2018	Haleakala	Pan-STARRS 1	·	2.7 km	MPC · JPL
745767	2011 HR_{107}	—	October 3, 2013	Kitt Peak	Spacewatch	·	900 m	MPC · JPL
745768	2011 HY_{107}	—	August 11, 2012	Siding Spring	SSS	·	2.7 km	MPC · JPL
745769	2011 HQ_{108}	—	April 5, 2016	Haleakala	Pan-STARRS 1	KOR	1.1 km	MPC · JPL
745770	2011 HF_{109}	—	September 15, 2013	Mount Lemmon	Mount Lemmon Survey	·	2.4 km	MPC · JPL
745771	2011 HH_{109}	—	October 3, 2013	Mount Lemmon	Mount Lemmon Survey	EOS	1.6 km	MPC · JPL
745772	2011 HR_{109}	—	April 23, 2011	Haleakala	Pan-STARRS 1	CLA	1.3 km	MPC · JPL
745773	2011 HV_{109}	—	April 30, 2011	Haleakala	Pan-STARRS 1	·	2.5 km	MPC · JPL
745774	2011 HB_{110}	—	April 22, 2011	Kitt Peak	Spacewatch	·	2.2 km	MPC · JPL
745775	2011 HO_{110}	—	April 28, 2011	Mount Lemmon	Mount Lemmon Survey	EOS	1.3 km	MPC · JPL
745776	2011 HZ_{110}	—	April 27, 2011	Mount Lemmon	Mount Lemmon Survey	HYG	2.4 km	MPC · JPL
745777	2011 HB_{111}	—	April 30, 2011	Mount Lemmon	Mount Lemmon Survey	·	2.5 km	MPC · JPL
745778	2011 JZ_{3}	—	May 1, 2011	Haleakala	Pan-STARRS 1	·	1.5 km	MPC · JPL
745779	2011 JB_{6}	—	May 1, 2011	Haleakala	Pan-STARRS 1	·	3.4 km	MPC · JPL
745780	2011 JU_{6}	—	May 3, 2011	Kitt Peak	Spacewatch	MAR	800 m	MPC · JPL
745781	2011 JM_{15}	—	May 12, 2011	Catalina	CSS	·	1.2 km	MPC · JPL
745782	2011 JT_{15}	—	March 11, 2011	Mount Lemmon	Mount Lemmon Survey	·	1.2 km	MPC · JPL
745783	2011 JV_{19}	—	May 1, 2011	Haleakala	Pan-STARRS 1	·	3.1 km	MPC · JPL
745784	2011 JD_{31}	—	May 12, 2011	Mount Lemmon	Mount Lemmon Survey	·	860 m	MPC · JPL
745785	2011 JH_{33}	—	May 6, 2011	Kitt Peak	Spacewatch	·	2.6 km	MPC · JPL
745786	2011 JO_{33}	—	May 13, 2011	Mount Lemmon	Mount Lemmon Survey	MAR	660 m	MPC · JPL
745787	2011 JR_{33}	—	May 8, 2011	Kitt Peak	Spacewatch	(895)	2.7 km	MPC · JPL
745788	2011 JY_{33}	—	August 10, 2012	Kitt Peak	Spacewatch	·	1.5 km	MPC · JPL
745789	2011 JE_{34}	—	September 7, 2016	Haleakala	Pan-STARRS 1	·	960 m	MPC · JPL
745790	2011 JQ_{34}	—	May 5, 2011	Mount Lemmon	Mount Lemmon Survey	·	2.5 km	MPC · JPL
745791	2011 JJ_{35}	—	February 9, 2016	Haleakala	Pan-STARRS 1	·	2.6 km	MPC · JPL
745792	2011 JL_{35}	—	October 28, 2013	Mount Lemmon	Mount Lemmon Survey	·	2.5 km	MPC · JPL
745793	2011 JM_{35}	—	November 26, 2014	Haleakala	Pan-STARRS 1	·	2.3 km	MPC · JPL
745794	2011 JS_{35}	—	May 1, 2011	Haleakala	Pan-STARRS 1	EOS	1.8 km	MPC · JPL
745795	2011 JN_{36}	—	May 1, 2011	Haleakala	Pan-STARRS 1	VER	2.2 km	MPC · JPL
745796	2011 JW_{36}	—	May 8, 2011	Mount Lemmon	Mount Lemmon Survey	ARM	3.2 km	MPC · JPL
745797	2011 JO_{37}	—	May 3, 2011	Mount Lemmon	Mount Lemmon Survey	·	2.5 km	MPC · JPL
745798	2011 JC_{38}	—	May 8, 2011	Mount Lemmon	Mount Lemmon Survey	EOS	1.3 km	MPC · JPL
745799	2011 KM	—	May 20, 2011	Haleakala	Pan-STARRS 1	·	880 m	MPC · JPL
745800	2011 KQ	—	May 21, 2011	Mount Lemmon	Mount Lemmon Survey	PHO	740 m	MPC · JPL

== 745801–745900 ==
back to top

Designation			Discovery			Properties		Ref
Permanent	Provisional	Named after	Date	Site	Discoverer(s)	Category	Diam.	Ref
745801	2011 KE_{1}	—	May 21, 2011	Mount Lemmon	Mount Lemmon Survey	(2076)	630 m	MPC · JPL
745802	2011 KF_{1}	—	February 25, 2007	Mount Lemmon	Mount Lemmon Survey	MAS	630 m	MPC · JPL
745803	2011 KU_{3}	—	April 27, 2011	Kitt Peak	Spacewatch	PHO	790 m	MPC · JPL
745804	2011 KP_{4}	—	May 23, 2011	Nogales	M. Schwartz, P. R. Holvorcem	T_{j} (2.95)	3.0 km	MPC · JPL
745805	2011 KR_{21}	—	May 31, 2011	Mount Lemmon	Mount Lemmon Survey	L5	9.2 km	MPC · JPL
745806	2011 KP_{23}	—	May 24, 2011	Haleakala	Pan-STARRS 1	·	930 m	MPC · JPL
745807	2011 KY_{23}	—	March 29, 2011	Mount Lemmon	Mount Lemmon Survey	·	800 m	MPC · JPL
745808	2011 KD_{24}	—	July 21, 2006	Catalina	CSS	·	2.4 km	MPC · JPL
745809	2011 KS_{30}	—	May 14, 2011	Mount Lemmon	Mount Lemmon Survey	·	950 m	MPC · JPL
745810	2011 KF_{32}	—	May 13, 2011	Mount Lemmon	Mount Lemmon Survey	·	980 m	MPC · JPL
745811	2011 KS_{35}	—	September 25, 2008	Mount Lemmon	Mount Lemmon Survey	·	870 m	MPC · JPL
745812	2011 KF_{37}	—	March 19, 2007	Mount Lemmon	Mount Lemmon Survey	·	930 m	MPC · JPL
745813	2011 KE_{38}	—	May 22, 2011	Mount Lemmon	Mount Lemmon Survey	·	860 m	MPC · JPL
745814	2011 KA_{41}	—	May 24, 2011	Haleakala	Pan-STARRS 1	·	2.4 km	MPC · JPL
745815	2011 KA_{42}	—	May 24, 2011	Haleakala	Pan-STARRS 1	T_{j} (2.98) · EUP	2.7 km	MPC · JPL
745816	2011 KW_{43}	—	May 10, 2011	Mount Lemmon	Mount Lemmon Survey	TIR	2.6 km	MPC · JPL
745817	2011 KT_{45}	—	March 8, 2005	Kitt Peak	Spacewatch	·	2.5 km	MPC · JPL
745818	2011 KB_{46}	—	May 30, 2011	Haleakala	Pan-STARRS 1	·	930 m	MPC · JPL
745819	2011 KH_{47}	—	May 13, 2011	Mount Lemmon	Mount Lemmon Survey	·	990 m	MPC · JPL
745820	2011 KR_{48}	—	June 10, 2002	Palomar	NEAT	·	2.9 km	MPC · JPL
745821	2011 KA_{50}	—	May 22, 2011	Mount Lemmon	Mount Lemmon Survey	·	1.0 km	MPC · JPL
745822	2011 KF_{50}	—	March 25, 2015	Haleakala	Pan-STARRS 1	HNS	890 m	MPC · JPL
745823	2011 KT_{50}	—	May 22, 2011	Mount Lemmon	Mount Lemmon Survey	·	1.4 km	MPC · JPL
745824	2011 KO_{52}	—	October 28, 2013	Mount Lemmon	Mount Lemmon Survey	·	3.0 km	MPC · JPL
745825	2011 KP_{52}	—	October 24, 2013	Mount Lemmon	Mount Lemmon Survey	·	1.5 km	MPC · JPL
745826	2011 KR_{52}	—	January 26, 2015	Haleakala	Pan-STARRS 1	·	2.5 km	MPC · JPL
745827	2011 KV_{52}	—	October 25, 2013	Mount Lemmon	Mount Lemmon Survey	·	2.1 km	MPC · JPL
745828	2011 KG_{53}	—	May 27, 2011	Nogales	M. Schwartz, P. R. Holvorcem	PHO	1.1 km	MPC · JPL
745829	2011 KK_{53}	—	May 26, 2011	Mount Lemmon	Mount Lemmon Survey	·	2.5 km	MPC · JPL
745830	2011 KP_{53}	—	May 22, 2011	Mount Lemmon	Mount Lemmon Survey	·	570 m	MPC · JPL
745831	2011 KQ_{53}	—	April 5, 2016	Haleakala	Pan-STARRS 1	EOS	1.5 km	MPC · JPL
745832	2011 KQ_{54}	—	March 3, 2016	Haleakala	Pan-STARRS 1	·	2.8 km	MPC · JPL
745833	2011 KY_{54}	—	November 9, 2013	Catalina	CSS	·	2.1 km	MPC · JPL
745834	2011 KB_{55}	—	May 31, 2011	Mount Lemmon	Mount Lemmon Survey	·	1.3 km	MPC · JPL
745835	2011 KL_{55}	—	May 23, 2011	Mount Lemmon	Mount Lemmon Survey	·	2.6 km	MPC · JPL
745836	2011 KY_{55}	—	May 24, 2011	Haleakala	Pan-STARRS 1	·	910 m	MPC · JPL
745837	2011 KN_{56}	—	May 22, 2011	Mount Lemmon	Mount Lemmon Survey	(5)	790 m	MPC · JPL
745838	2011 KV_{57}	—	May 24, 2011	Mount Lemmon	Mount Lemmon Survey	·	2.5 km	MPC · JPL
745839	2011 LG_{6}	—	June 4, 2011	Mount Lemmon	Mount Lemmon Survey	·	970 m	MPC · JPL
745840	2011 LE_{13}	—	June 7, 2011	Haleakala	Pan-STARRS 1	NYS	840 m	MPC · JPL
745841	2011 LR_{14}	—	June 5, 2011	Nogales	M. Schwartz, P. R. Holvorcem	TIR	2.9 km	MPC · JPL
745842	2011 LW_{14}	—	April 24, 2011	Kitt Peak	Spacewatch	·	3.1 km	MPC · JPL
745843	2011 LQ_{15}	—	May 12, 2011	Mount Lemmon	Mount Lemmon Survey	(194)	1.2 km	MPC · JPL
745844	2011 LV_{15}	—	June 7, 2011	Haleakala	Pan-STARRS 1	H	440 m	MPC · JPL
745845	2011 LP_{20}	—	June 12, 2011	Mount Lemmon	Mount Lemmon Survey	·	1.6 km	MPC · JPL
745846	2011 LB_{21}	—	October 18, 2007	Mount Lemmon	Mount Lemmon Survey	BAR	900 m	MPC · JPL
745847	2011 LK_{23}	—	June 5, 2011	Kitt Peak	Spacewatch	·	810 m	MPC · JPL
745848	2011 LZ_{25}	—	May 13, 2011	Mount Lemmon	Mount Lemmon Survey	·	960 m	MPC · JPL
745849	2011 LU_{26}	—	September 25, 2008	Mount Lemmon	Mount Lemmon Survey	·	410 m	MPC · JPL
745850	2011 LO_{29}	—	June 9, 2011	Mount Lemmon	Mount Lemmon Survey	·	870 m	MPC · JPL
745851	2011 LQ_{29}	—	June 3, 2011	Mount Lemmon	Mount Lemmon Survey	(5)	1.0 km	MPC · JPL
745852	2011 LS_{29}	—	November 13, 2012	Kitt Peak	Spacewatch	EUN	770 m	MPC · JPL
745853	2011 LX_{29}	—	May 12, 2015	Mount Lemmon	Mount Lemmon Survey	·	800 m	MPC · JPL
745854	2011 LY_{29}	—	November 7, 2012	Mount Lemmon	Mount Lemmon Survey	(5)	1.1 km	MPC · JPL
745855	2011 LB_{30}	—	November 9, 2013	Haleakala	Pan-STARRS 1	·	1.4 km	MPC · JPL
745856	2011 LE_{30}	—	June 9, 2011	Mount Lemmon	Mount Lemmon Survey	·	1.3 km	MPC · JPL
745857	2011 LJ_{30}	—	January 1, 2014	Mount Lemmon	Mount Lemmon Survey	EUN	1.2 km	MPC · JPL
745858	2011 LS_{31}	—	September 14, 2013	Haleakala	Pan-STARRS 1	·	2.7 km	MPC · JPL
745859	2011 LW_{31}	—	June 4, 2011	Mount Lemmon	Mount Lemmon Survey	(5)	900 m	MPC · JPL
745860	2011 LA_{32}	—	May 7, 2015	Haleakala	Pan-STARRS 1	EUN	990 m	MPC · JPL
745861	2011 LD_{32}	—	April 23, 2015	Haleakala	Pan-STARRS 1	·	840 m	MPC · JPL
745862	2011 LG_{32}	—	March 13, 2016	Haleakala	Pan-STARRS 1	·	1.5 km	MPC · JPL
745863	2011 LK_{32}	—	October 15, 2013	Mount Lemmon	Mount Lemmon Survey	·	3.0 km	MPC · JPL
745864	2011 LM_{32}	—	June 10, 2011	Mount Lemmon	Mount Lemmon Survey	·	3.2 km	MPC · JPL
745865	2011 LO_{32}	—	November 28, 2013	Mount Lemmon	Mount Lemmon Survey	·	1.6 km	MPC · JPL
745866	2011 LR_{32}	—	June 6, 2011	Haleakala	Pan-STARRS 1	H	430 m	MPC · JPL
745867	2011 LE_{33}	—	September 17, 2013	Mount Lemmon	Mount Lemmon Survey	·	2.7 km	MPC · JPL
745868	2011 LY_{33}	—	January 19, 2015	Mount Lemmon	Mount Lemmon Survey	·	2.5 km	MPC · JPL
745869	2011 LE_{34}	—	June 10, 2011	Mount Lemmon	Mount Lemmon Survey	·	1.0 km	MPC · JPL
745870	2011 MK_{2}	—	October 25, 2008	Kitt Peak	Spacewatch	BRG	1.4 km	MPC · JPL
745871	2011 MG_{4}	—	June 27, 2011	Kitt Peak	Spacewatch	·	1.1 km	MPC · JPL
745872	2011 MQ_{9}	—	May 22, 2011	Mount Lemmon	Mount Lemmon Survey	·	1.2 km	MPC · JPL
745873	2011 MY_{11}	—	October 22, 2012	Piszkés-tető	K. Sárneczky, G. Hodosán	·	1.7 km	MPC · JPL
745874	2011 MC_{13}	—	June 13, 2015	Mount Lemmon	Mount Lemmon Survey	·	1.1 km	MPC · JPL
745875	2011 MF_{13}	—	June 23, 2015	Haleakala	Pan-STARRS 1	·	840 m	MPC · JPL
745876	2011 MG_{14}	—	June 26, 2011	Mount Lemmon	Mount Lemmon Survey	L5	8.9 km	MPC · JPL
745877	2011 MH_{15}	—	June 28, 2011	Mount Lemmon	Mount Lemmon Survey	·	1.1 km	MPC · JPL
745878	2011 MJ_{15}	—	June 23, 2011	Mount Lemmon	Mount Lemmon Survey	·	1.4 km	MPC · JPL
745879	2011 NC	—	July 1, 2011	Kitt Peak	Spacewatch	H	510 m	MPC · JPL
745880	2011 NG	—	July 1, 2011	Mount Lemmon	Mount Lemmon Survey	BRG	1.3 km	MPC · JPL
745881	2011 NS_{4}	—	October 10, 2016	Haleakala	Pan-STARRS 1	HNS	820 m	MPC · JPL
745882	2011 NG_{5}	—	July 3, 2011	Mount Lemmon	Mount Lemmon Survey	·	1.1 km	MPC · JPL
745883	2011 NR_{5}	—	July 2, 2011	Mount Lemmon	Mount Lemmon Survey	L5	8.0 km	MPC · JPL
745884	2011 OD	—	July 20, 2011	Haleakala	Pan-STARRS 1	H	410 m	MPC · JPL
745885	2011 OX_{5}	—	July 24, 2011	Haleakala	Pan-STARRS 1	RAF	720 m	MPC · JPL
745886	2011 OQ_{8}	—	July 26, 2011	Haleakala	Pan-STARRS 1	·	1.3 km	MPC · JPL
745887	2011 OO_{9}	—	July 26, 2011	Haleakala	Pan-STARRS 1	EUN	960 m	MPC · JPL
745888	2011 OX_{10}	—	June 23, 2011	Kitt Peak	Spacewatch	·	1.6 km	MPC · JPL
745889	2011 OM_{12}	—	July 25, 2011	Haleakala	Pan-STARRS 1	MAR	810 m	MPC · JPL
745890	2011 OB_{13}	—	July 25, 2011	Haleakala	Pan-STARRS 1	T_{j} (2.98) · EUP	2.2 km	MPC · JPL
745891	2011 OK_{24}	—	July 28, 2011	Haleakala	Pan-STARRS 1	H	460 m	MPC · JPL
745892	2011 OS_{24}	—	June 12, 2011	Mount Lemmon	Mount Lemmon Survey	·	1.4 km	MPC · JPL
745893	2011 OK_{29}	—	July 26, 2011	Haleakala	Pan-STARRS 1	·	2.1 km	MPC · JPL
745894	2011 OH_{32}	—	January 2, 2009	Mount Lemmon	Mount Lemmon Survey	·	1.3 km	MPC · JPL
745895	2011 OP_{32}	—	July 27, 2011	Haleakala	Pan-STARRS 1	·	1.7 km	MPC · JPL
745896	2011 OQ_{32}	—	July 27, 2011	Haleakala	Pan-STARRS 1	·	1.2 km	MPC · JPL
745897	2011 OR_{36}	—	October 24, 2003	Kitt Peak	Spacewatch	·	1.1 km	MPC · JPL
745898	2011 OW_{37}	—	August 1, 2011	Haleakala	Pan-STARRS 1	V	530 m	MPC · JPL
745899	2011 OQ_{38}	—	July 28, 2011	Haleakala	Pan-STARRS 1	·	1.8 km	MPC · JPL
745900	2011 OB_{40}	—	July 31, 2011	Haleakala	Pan-STARRS 1	·	450 m	MPC · JPL

== 745901–746000 ==
back to top

Designation			Discovery			Properties		Ref
Permanent	Provisional	Named after	Date	Site	Discoverer(s)	Category	Diam.	Ref
745901	2011 OC_{41}	—	July 27, 2011	Haleakala	Pan-STARRS 1	·	1.5 km	MPC · JPL
745902	2011 OF_{51}	—	September 14, 2007	Catalina	CSS	·	1.1 km	MPC · JPL
745903	2011 OQ_{51}	—	June 25, 2011	Kitt Peak	Spacewatch	L5	7.7 km	MPC · JPL
745904	2011 OR_{51}	—	June 27, 2011	Kitt Peak	Spacewatch	MAR	870 m	MPC · JPL
745905	2011 OE_{53}	—	July 26, 2011	Haleakala	Pan-STARRS 1	EUN	990 m	MPC · JPL
745906	2011 OL_{56}	—	July 27, 2011	Haleakala	Pan-STARRS 1	·	620 m	MPC · JPL
745907	2011 OW_{56}	—	July 27, 2011	Haleakala	Pan-STARRS 1	H	460 m	MPC · JPL
745908	2011 OS_{58}	—	July 31, 2011	Mayhill-ISON	L. Elenin	·	1.6 km	MPC · JPL
745909	2011 OE_{61}	—	December 30, 2008	Mount Lemmon	Mount Lemmon Survey	·	1.1 km	MPC · JPL
745910	2011 OL_{61}	—	July 25, 2011	Haleakala	Pan-STARRS 1	MAR	1.0 km	MPC · JPL
745911	2011 OS_{61}	—	February 26, 2014	Haleakala	Pan-STARRS 1	·	1.0 km	MPC · JPL
745912	2011 OH_{62}	—	August 24, 2017	Haleakala	Pan-STARRS 1	EOS	1.8 km	MPC · JPL
745913	2011 OC_{63}	—	July 26, 2011	Haleakala	Pan-STARRS 1	·	850 m	MPC · JPL
745914	2011 OR_{63}	—	January 10, 2014	Mount Lemmon	Mount Lemmon Survey	EOS	1.7 km	MPC · JPL
745915	2011 OR_{64}	—	July 28, 2011	Haleakala	Pan-STARRS 1	L5	5.9 km	MPC · JPL
745916	2011 OS_{65}	—	October 25, 2016	Haleakala	Pan-STARRS 1	·	1.1 km	MPC · JPL
745917	2011 OU_{65}	—	January 24, 2014	Haleakala	Pan-STARRS 1	EUN	810 m	MPC · JPL
745918	2011 OG_{66}	—	December 21, 2012	Mount Lemmon	Mount Lemmon Survey	·	1.0 km	MPC · JPL
745919	2011 OJ_{66}	—	January 8, 2017	Mount Lemmon	Mount Lemmon Survey	·	960 m	MPC · JPL
745920	2011 OK_{66}	—	October 10, 2016	Haleakala	Pan-STARRS 1	·	1.6 km	MPC · JPL
745921	2011 OT_{66}	—	July 26, 2011	Haleakala	Pan-STARRS 1	·	2.2 km	MPC · JPL
745922	2011 OY_{66}	—	July 28, 2011	Haleakala	Pan-STARRS 1	EUN	960 m	MPC · JPL
745923	2011 OG_{67}	—	July 31, 2011	Haleakala	Pan-STARRS 1	EUN	950 m	MPC · JPL
745924	2011 OK_{67}	—	October 17, 2012	Mount Lemmon	Mount Lemmon Survey	·	2.3 km	MPC · JPL
745925	2011 OX_{67}	—	December 3, 2012	Mount Lemmon	Mount Lemmon Survey	·	1.4 km	MPC · JPL
745926	2011 OB_{69}	—	July 31, 2011	La Sagra	OAM	·	1.2 km	MPC · JPL
745927	2011 OD_{69}	—	July 25, 2015	Haleakala	Pan-STARRS 1	·	820 m	MPC · JPL
745928	2011 OE_{69}	—	December 5, 2012	Mount Lemmon	Mount Lemmon Survey	·	1.1 km	MPC · JPL
745929	2011 OL_{70}	—	July 26, 2011	Haleakala	Pan-STARRS 1	·	530 m	MPC · JPL
745930	2011 OY_{70}	—	July 27, 2011	Haleakala	Pan-STARRS 1	·	1.3 km	MPC · JPL
745931	2011 OL_{71}	—	July 28, 2011	Haleakala	Pan-STARRS 1	·	1.2 km	MPC · JPL
745932	2011 OX_{71}	—	July 27, 2011	Haleakala	Pan-STARRS 1	L5	7.4 km	MPC · JPL
745933	2011 OW_{72}	—	July 27, 2011	Haleakala	Pan-STARRS 1	EUN	960 m	MPC · JPL
745934	2011 OV_{77}	—	July 27, 2011	Haleakala	Pan-STARRS 1	L5	6.5 km	MPC · JPL
745935	2011 PG_{2}	—	August 7, 2011	Siding Spring	SSS	·	1.4 km	MPC · JPL
745936	2011 PU_{3}	—	August 1, 2011	Haleakala	Pan-STARRS 1	·	620 m	MPC · JPL
745937	2011 PD_{4}	—	August 2, 2011	Haleakala	Pan-STARRS 1	MIS	1.9 km	MPC · JPL
745938	2011 PO_{11}	—	August 2, 2011	Haleakala	Pan-STARRS 1	L5	7.4 km	MPC · JPL
745939	2011 PZ_{15}	—	September 18, 2012	Kitt Peak	Spacewatch	L5	7.0 km	MPC · JPL
745940	2011 PA_{16}	—	November 21, 2014	Haleakala	Pan-STARRS 1	L5	10 km	MPC · JPL
745941	2011 PA_{17}	—	August 2, 2011	Haleakala	Pan-STARRS 1	·	3.3 km	MPC · JPL
745942	2011 PC_{17}	—	August 2, 2011	Haleakala	Pan-STARRS 1	·	1.6 km	MPC · JPL
745943	2011 PF_{17}	—	October 22, 2012	Haleakala	Pan-STARRS 1	EOS	1.5 km	MPC · JPL
745944	2011 PR_{17}	—	November 12, 2012	Mount Lemmon	Mount Lemmon Survey	·	1.4 km	MPC · JPL
745945	2011 PF_{19}	—	August 10, 2011	Haleakala	Pan-STARRS 1	(5)	790 m	MPC · JPL
745946	2011 PB_{21}	—	May 2, 2014	Mount Lemmon	Mount Lemmon Survey	·	1.4 km	MPC · JPL
745947	2011 PT_{21}	—	August 4, 2011	Haleakala	Pan-STARRS 1	·	1.3 km	MPC · JPL
745948	2011 PZ_{21}	—	August 6, 2011	Haleakala	Pan-STARRS 1	·	900 m	MPC · JPL
745949	2011 PK_{23}	—	August 2, 2011	Haleakala	Pan-STARRS 1	EOS	1.3 km	MPC · JPL
745950	2011 QF_{2}	—	August 19, 2011	Haleakala	Pan-STARRS 1	·	2.0 km	MPC · JPL
745951	2011 QC_{4}	—	July 2, 2011	Kitt Peak	Spacewatch	·	1.5 km	MPC · JPL
745952	2011 QJ_{6}	—	August 22, 2011	Haleakala	Pan-STARRS 1	·	1.2 km	MPC · JPL
745953	2011 QP_{6}	—	August 22, 2011	Haleakala	Pan-STARRS 1	·	1.2 km	MPC · JPL
745954	2011 QQ_{6}	—	August 21, 2011	Haleakala	Pan-STARRS 1	·	1.1 km	MPC · JPL
745955	2011 QM_{12}	—	August 21, 2011	Haleakala	Pan-STARRS 1	H	420 m	MPC · JPL
745956	2011 QE_{13}	—	October 25, 2008	Kitt Peak	Spacewatch	·	530 m	MPC · JPL
745957	2011 QQ_{14}	—	June 23, 2011	Mount Lemmon	Mount Lemmon Survey	·	1.2 km	MPC · JPL
745958	2011 QM_{16}	—	October 20, 2007	Mount Lemmon	Mount Lemmon Survey	·	1.1 km	MPC · JPL
745959	2011 QB_{17}	—	August 20, 2011	Haleakala	Pan-STARRS 1	URS	3.0 km	MPC · JPL
745960	2011 QU_{17}	—	August 21, 2011	La Sagra	OAM	BAR	1.6 km	MPC · JPL
745961	2011 QB_{19}	—	August 23, 2011	Haleakala	Pan-STARRS 1	HYG	2.3 km	MPC · JPL
745962	2011 QZ_{19}	—	August 19, 2011	Haleakala	Pan-STARRS 1	·	990 m	MPC · JPL
745963	2011 QL_{20}	—	August 23, 2011	Haleakala	Pan-STARRS 1	·	1.4 km	MPC · JPL
745964	2011 QP_{20}	—	August 23, 2011	Haleakala	Pan-STARRS 1	·	2.2 km	MPC · JPL
745965	2011 QO_{21}	—	August 25, 2011	Dauban	C. Rinner, Kugel, F.	·	850 m	MPC · JPL
745966	2011 QM_{22}	—	August 23, 2011	La Sagra	OAM	·	1.1 km	MPC · JPL
745967	2011 QX_{26}	—	August 21, 2011	Haleakala	Pan-STARRS 1	·	1.4 km	MPC · JPL
745968	2011 QB_{28}	—	August 22, 2011	La Sagra	OAM	·	1.2 km	MPC · JPL
745969	2011 QW_{31}	—	August 25, 2011	Zelenchukskaya Stn	T. V. Krjačko, Satovski, B.	H	400 m	MPC · JPL
745970	2011 QK_{34}	—	August 24, 2011	Haleakala	Pan-STARRS 1	EUN	960 m	MPC · JPL
745971	2011 QX_{34}	—	August 25, 2011	Piszkéstető	K. Sárneczky	TIR	2.7 km	MPC · JPL
745972	2011 QX_{42}	—	August 24, 2011	Haleakala	Pan-STARRS 1	·	1.4 km	MPC · JPL
745973	2011 QK_{44}	—	August 26, 2011	Haleakala	Pan-STARRS 1	TIR	2.7 km	MPC · JPL
745974	2011 QM_{44}	—	March 14, 2007	Mount Lemmon	Mount Lemmon Survey	·	840 m	MPC · JPL
745975	2011 QH_{45}	—	August 28, 2011	Haleakala	Pan-STARRS 1	·	920 m	MPC · JPL
745976	2011 QU_{45}	—	August 29, 2011	Haleakala	Pan-STARRS 1	H	380 m	MPC · JPL
745977	2011 QO_{46}	—	August 29, 2011	Haleakala	Pan-STARRS 1	L5	6.8 km	MPC · JPL
745978	2011 QP_{53}	—	August 24, 2011	Haleakala	Pan-STARRS 1	·	2.3 km	MPC · JPL
745979	2011 QJ_{54}	—	November 2, 2008	Kitt Peak	Spacewatch	·	480 m	MPC · JPL
745980	2011 QB_{56}	—	September 30, 2006	Mount Lemmon	Mount Lemmon Survey	·	2.3 km	MPC · JPL
745981	2011 QD_{63}	—	October 21, 2007	Kitt Peak	Spacewatch	·	770 m	MPC · JPL
745982	2011 QO_{66}	—	August 26, 2011	Haleakala	Pan-STARRS 1	·	1.1 km	MPC · JPL
745983	2011 QZ_{70}	—	November 9, 2007	Kitt Peak	Spacewatch	·	1.4 km	MPC · JPL
745984	2011 QD_{71}	—	September 29, 2002	Haleakala	NEAT	·	1.5 km	MPC · JPL
745985	2011 QY_{74}	—	August 21, 2011	Haleakala	Pan-STARRS 1	·	920 m	MPC · JPL
745986	2011 QR_{75}	—	August 31, 2011	Haleakala	Pan-STARRS 1	·	940 m	MPC · JPL
745987	2011 QU_{80}	—	October 20, 2006	Mount Lemmon	Mount Lemmon Survey	·	2.1 km	MPC · JPL
745988	2011 QX_{81}	—	August 24, 2011	Haleakala	Pan-STARRS 1	·	930 m	MPC · JPL
745989	2011 QH_{85}	—	August 24, 2011	Haleakala	Pan-STARRS 1	·	2.3 km	MPC · JPL
745990	2011 QS_{86}	—	October 21, 2007	Kitt Peak	Spacewatch	·	1.2 km	MPC · JPL
745991	2011 QX_{87}	—	August 27, 2011	Haleakala	Pan-STARRS 1	·	1.5 km	MPC · JPL
745992	2011 QK_{88}	—	August 23, 2011	Haleakala	Pan-STARRS 1	EUN	900 m	MPC · JPL
745993	2011 QH_{98}	—	August 30, 2011	Haleakala	Pan-STARRS 1	·	1.6 km	MPC · JPL
745994	2011 QM_{98}	—	July 27, 2011	Haleakala	Pan-STARRS 1	·	1.3 km	MPC · JPL
745995	2011 QW_{98}	—	October 1, 2011	Catalina	CSS	·	1.4 km	MPC · JPL
745996	2011 QU_{100}	—	August 23, 2011	Haleakala	Pan-STARRS 1	·	1.1 km	MPC · JPL
745997	2011 QV_{100}	—	October 10, 2007	Mount Lemmon	Mount Lemmon Survey	·	1.5 km	MPC · JPL
745998	2011 QX_{100}	—	August 31, 2011	Haleakala	Pan-STARRS 1	·	780 m	MPC · JPL
745999	2011 QB_{101}	—	May 22, 2015	Haleakala	Pan-STARRS 1	·	1.7 km	MPC · JPL
746000	2011 QL_{101}	—	January 26, 2014	Haleakala	Pan-STARRS 1	·	2.2 km	MPC · JPL

back to top

== Meaning of names ==
As minor planet discoveries are confirmed, they are given a permanent number by the IAU's Minor Planet Center (MPC), and the discoverers can then submit names for them, following the IAU's naming conventions. The list below concerns those minor planets in the specified number-range that have received names, and explains the meanings of those names.

Official naming citations of newly named small Solar System bodies are approved and published in a bulletin by IAU's Working Group for Small Bodies Nomenclature (WGSBN). Before May 2021, citations were published in MPC's Minor Planet Circulars for many decades. Recent citations can also be found on the JPL Small-Body Database (SBDB). Until his death in 2016, German astronomer Lutz D. Schmadel compiled these citations into the Dictionary of Minor Planet Names (DMP) and regularly updated the collection.

Based on Paul Herget's The Names of the Minor Planets, Schmadel also researched the unclear origin of numerous asteroids, most of which had been named prior to World War II. This article incorporates text from this source, which is in the public domain: SBDB New namings may only be added to this list below after official publication as the preannouncement of names is condemned. The WGSBN publishes a comprehensive guideline for the naming rules of non-cometary small Solar System bodies.

Named minor planet	Provisional	This minor planet was named for...	Ref · Catalog
745254 Friedhelm	2010 VM_{122}	Friedhelm Haas, teacher at the Martin-Buber-Schule in Heppenheim, Germany.	IAU · 745254
745492 Saanich	2011 CH_{21}	Saanich is a municipality located on southern Vancouver Island in British Columbia, Canada.	IAU · 745492
