= List of minor planets: 741001–742000 =

The following is a partial list of minor planets, running from minor-planet number 741001 through 742000, inclusive. The primary data for this and other partial lists is based on JPL's "Small-Body Orbital Elements" and data available from the Minor Planet Center. Critical list information is also provided by the MPC, unless otherwise specified from Lowell Observatory. A detailed description of the table's columns and additional sources are given on the main page including a complete list of every page in this series, and a statistical break-up on the dynamical classification of minor planets.

Also see the summary list of all named bodies in numerical and alphabetical order, and the corresponding naming citations for the number range of this particular list. New namings may only be added to this list after official publication, as the preannouncement of names is condemned by the Working Group for Small Bodies Nomenclature of the International Astronomical Union.

Near-Earth obj.	MBA (inner)	MBA (outer)	Centaur
Mars-crosser	MBA (middle)	Jupiter trojan	Trans-Neptunian obj.
Unclassified

== 741001–741100 ==
Designation			Discovery			Properties		Ref
Permanent	Provisional	Named after	Date	Site	Discoverer(s)	Category	Diam.	Ref
741001	2005 EN_{308}	—	March 8, 2005	Mount Lemmon	Mount Lemmon Survey	·	2.2 km	MPC · JPL
741002	2005 ED_{309}	—	March 9, 2005	Mount Lemmon	Mount Lemmon Survey	·	970 m	MPC · JPL
741003	2005 EK_{314}	—	March 11, 2005	Kitt Peak	Deep Ecliptic Survey	·	1 km	MPC · JPL
741004	2005 EH_{320}	—	February 9, 2005	Mount Lemmon	Mount Lemmon Survey	·	680 m	MPC · JPL
741005	2005 EQ_{338}	—	September 18, 2006	Kitt Peak	Spacewatch	·	600 m	MPC · JPL
741006	2005 EY_{338}	—	July 14, 2013	Haleakala	Pan-STARRS 1	·	2.4 km	MPC · JPL
741007	2005 ER_{341}	—	July 28, 2011	Haleakala	Pan-STARRS 1	·	1.4 km	MPC · JPL
741008	2005 EB_{342}	—	January 14, 2016	Haleakala	Pan-STARRS 1	EUP	3.3 km	MPC · JPL
741009	2005 ED_{342}	—	March 12, 2016	Haleakala	Pan-STARRS 1	·	1.9 km	MPC · JPL
741010	2005 EO_{342}	—	March 4, 2005	Mount Lemmon	Mount Lemmon Survey	·	740 m	MPC · JPL
741011	2005 ES_{344}	—	August 24, 2007	Kitt Peak	Spacewatch	·	2.1 km	MPC · JPL
741012	2005 EM_{345}	—	September 14, 2007	Kitt Peak	Spacewatch	·	1.2 km	MPC · JPL
741013	2005 EN_{345}	—	February 6, 2016	Haleakala	Pan-STARRS 1	·	2.3 km	MPC · JPL
741014	2005 EW_{346}	—	November 2, 2008	Kitt Peak	Spacewatch	·	2.3 km	MPC · JPL
741015	2005 EQ_{347}	—	March 10, 2005	Mount Lemmon	Mount Lemmon Survey	·	2.1 km	MPC · JPL
741016	2005 ER_{347}	—	December 13, 2014	Haleakala	Pan-STARRS 1	·	2.2 km	MPC · JPL
741017	2005 EP_{348}	—	March 10, 2005	Mount Lemmon	Mount Lemmon Survey	EUN	920 m	MPC · JPL
741018	2005 EE_{349}	—	March 11, 2005	Mount Lemmon	Mount Lemmon Survey	·	2.6 km	MPC · JPL
741019	2005 FL_{17}	—	March 17, 2005	Mount Lemmon	Mount Lemmon Survey	·	500 m	MPC · JPL
741020	2005 FY_{17}	—	September 6, 2014	Mount Lemmon	Mount Lemmon Survey	·	2.0 km	MPC · JPL
741021	2005 FJ_{18}	—	October 21, 2008	Mount Lemmon	Mount Lemmon Survey	·	2.8 km	MPC · JPL
741022	2005 GL_{15}	—	March 17, 2005	Kitt Peak	Spacewatch	·	1.1 km	MPC · JPL
741023	2005 GT_{19}	—	April 2, 2005	Mount Lemmon	Mount Lemmon Survey	H	390 m	MPC · JPL
741024	2005 GM_{21}	—	April 3, 2005	Palomar	NEAT	·	720 m	MPC · JPL
741025	2005 GH_{32}	—	March 8, 2005	Mount Lemmon	Mount Lemmon Survey	·	1.9 km	MPC · JPL
741026	2005 GT_{36}	—	April 2, 2005	Mount Lemmon	Mount Lemmon Survey	H	350 m	MPC · JPL
741027	2005 GY_{39}	—	April 4, 2005	Mount Lemmon	Mount Lemmon Survey	HNS	950 m	MPC · JPL
741028	2005 GL_{42}	—	January 13, 2005	Kitt Peak	Spacewatch	·	2.4 km	MPC · JPL
741029	2005 GF_{49}	—	April 5, 2005	Mount Lemmon	Mount Lemmon Survey	·	1.5 km	MPC · JPL
741030	2005 GK_{51}	—	April 2, 2005	Mount Lemmon	Mount Lemmon Survey	VER	1.9 km	MPC · JPL
741031	2005 GG_{111}	—	March 11, 2005	Kitt Peak	Spacewatch	·	1.7 km	MPC · JPL
741032	2005 GP_{111}	—	April 5, 2005	Mount Lemmon	Mount Lemmon Survey	·	610 m	MPC · JPL
741033	2005 GO_{130}	—	April 7, 2005	Kitt Peak	Spacewatch	H	470 m	MPC · JPL
741034	2005 GB_{150}	—	April 11, 2005	Kitt Peak	Spacewatch	·	2.3 km	MPC · JPL
741035	2005 GM_{176}	—	March 12, 2005	Mount Lemmon	Mount Lemmon Survey	JUN	770 m	MPC · JPL
741036	2005 GJ_{184}	—	April 10, 2005	Kitt Peak	Deep Ecliptic Survey	EOS	1.6 km	MPC · JPL
741037	2005 GY_{196}	—	April 10, 2005	Kitt Peak	Deep Ecliptic Survey	JUN	940 m	MPC · JPL
741038	2005 GQ_{220}	—	March 8, 2005	Mount Lemmon	Mount Lemmon Survey	·	3.4 km	MPC · JPL
741039	2005 GL_{232}	—	November 20, 2014	Mount Lemmon	Mount Lemmon Survey	·	560 m	MPC · JPL
741040	2005 GS_{232}	—	February 11, 2016	Haleakala	Pan-STARRS 1	·	980 m	MPC · JPL
741041	2005 GV_{232}	—	April 22, 2012	Kitt Peak	Spacewatch	·	670 m	MPC · JPL
741042	2005 GC_{234}	—	April 11, 2005	Mount Lemmon	Mount Lemmon Survey	·	1.5 km	MPC · JPL
741043	2005 GL_{234}	—	April 9, 2005	Kitt Peak	Spacewatch	H	450 m	MPC · JPL
741044	2005 GN_{234}	—	May 7, 2011	Kitt Peak	Spacewatch	TIR	2.2 km	MPC · JPL
741045	2005 GO_{234}	—	August 15, 2009	Kitt Peak	Spacewatch	·	550 m	MPC · JPL
741046	2005 GN_{235}	—	April 2, 2005	Mount Lemmon	Mount Lemmon Survey	·	2.5 km	MPC · JPL
741047	2005 GX_{235}	—	March 3, 2009	Kitt Peak	Spacewatch	·	1.2 km	MPC · JPL
741048	2005 GH_{236}	—	March 5, 2013	Haleakala	Pan-STARRS 1	H	420 m	MPC · JPL
741049	2005 GK_{237}	—	March 7, 2016	Haleakala	Pan-STARRS 1	·	1.9 km	MPC · JPL
741050	2005 GA_{238}	—	February 17, 2010	Kitt Peak	Spacewatch	·	1.9 km	MPC · JPL
741051	2005 GX_{238}	—	April 2, 2005	Kitt Peak	Spacewatch	·	1.5 km	MPC · JPL
741052	2005 GK_{239}	—	April 2, 2005	Kitt Peak	Spacewatch	NYS	890 m	MPC · JPL
741053	2005 HE_{11}	—	February 11, 2008	Mount Lemmon	Mount Lemmon Survey	·	570 m	MPC · JPL
741054	2005 HK_{11}	—	March 13, 2012	Mount Lemmon	Mount Lemmon Survey	·	940 m	MPC · JPL
741055	2005 JY_{11}	—	April 11, 2005	Mount Lemmon	Mount Lemmon Survey	HNS	960 m	MPC · JPL
741056	2005 JU_{15}	—	October 12, 2013	Kitt Peak	Spacewatch	·	2.7 km	MPC · JPL
741057	2005 JR_{23}	—	March 11, 2005	Kitt Peak	Spacewatch	(1547)	1.3 km	MPC · JPL
741058	2005 JZ_{29}	—	May 3, 2005	Kitt Peak	Spacewatch	·	1.2 km	MPC · JPL
741059	2005 JA_{36}	—	May 4, 2005	Kitt Peak	Spacewatch	·	1.3 km	MPC · JPL
741060	2005 JF_{36}	—	May 4, 2005	Kitt Peak	Spacewatch	·	820 m	MPC · JPL
741061	2005 JL_{39}	—	May 7, 2005	Kitt Peak	Spacewatch	·	1.5 km	MPC · JPL
741062	2005 JG_{47}	—	April 16, 2005	Kitt Peak	Spacewatch	NYS	870 m	MPC · JPL
741063	2005 JT_{49}	—	May 4, 2005	Kitt Peak	Spacewatch	·	870 m	MPC · JPL
741064	2005 JM_{53}	—	May 4, 2005	Mount Lemmon	Mount Lemmon Survey	·	2.6 km	MPC · JPL
741065	2005 JM_{62}	—	April 17, 2005	Kitt Peak	Spacewatch	·	2.6 km	MPC · JPL
741066	2005 JZ_{95}	—	May 8, 2005	Kitt Peak	Spacewatch	·	1.3 km	MPC · JPL
741067	2005 JM_{99}	—	May 9, 2005	Kitt Peak	Spacewatch	TIR	1.9 km	MPC · JPL
741068	2005 JT_{109}	—	May 10, 2005	Mount Lemmon	Mount Lemmon Survey	H	520 m	MPC · JPL
741069	2005 JC_{121}	—	May 10, 2005	Kitt Peak	Spacewatch	·	920 m	MPC · JPL
741070	2005 JZ_{152}	—	April 4, 2005	Catalina	CSS	H	550 m	MPC · JPL
741071	2005 JM_{175}	—	May 1, 2005	Kitt Peak	Spacewatch	·	3.0 km	MPC · JPL
741072	2005 JF_{190}	—	November 26, 2017	Mount Lemmon	Mount Lemmon Survey	·	590 m	MPC · JPL
741073	2005 JQ_{190}	—	June 4, 2011	Mount Lemmon	Mount Lemmon Survey	T_{j} (2.95)	4.3 km	MPC · JPL
741074	2005 JY_{190}	—	September 20, 2007	Kitt Peak	Spacewatch	·	2.6 km	MPC · JPL
741075	2005 JO_{191}	—	March 6, 2016	Haleakala	Pan-STARRS 1	·	2.7 km	MPC · JPL
741076	2005 JF_{194}	—	February 18, 2015	Mount Lemmon	Mount Lemmon Survey	·	2.3 km	MPC · JPL
741077	2005 KV_{3}	—	April 16, 2005	Kitt Peak	Spacewatch	·	570 m	MPC · JPL
741078	2005 KQ_{15}	—	November 9, 2013	Haleakala	Pan-STARRS 1	·	730 m	MPC · JPL
741079	2005 KT_{15}	—	May 30, 2005	Siding Spring	SSS	·	1.2 km	MPC · JPL
741080	2005 LM_{1}	—	June 1, 2005	Mount Lemmon	Mount Lemmon Survey	·	2.0 km	MPC · JPL
741081	2005 LW_{3}	—	June 5, 2005	Siding Spring	SSS	APO · PHA · moon	160 m	MPC · JPL
741082	2005 LG_{23}	—	June 8, 2005	Kitt Peak	Spacewatch	·	1.7 km	MPC · JPL
741083	2005 LE_{27}	—	June 8, 2005	Kitt Peak	Spacewatch	·	600 m	MPC · JPL
741084	2005 LS_{29}	—	May 10, 2005	Mount Lemmon	Mount Lemmon Survey	·	920 m	MPC · JPL
741085	2005 LM_{38}	—	June 1, 2005	Mount Lemmon	Mount Lemmon Survey	·	1.7 km	MPC · JPL
741086	2005 LY_{41}	—	June 13, 2005	Mount Lemmon	Mount Lemmon Survey	·	1.1 km	MPC · JPL
741087	2005 LN_{44}	—	May 20, 2005	Mount Lemmon	Mount Lemmon Survey	·	980 m	MPC · JPL
741088	2005 LU_{45}	—	June 13, 2005	Kitt Peak	Spacewatch	slow	1.6 km	MPC · JPL
741089	2005 LM_{46}	—	June 13, 2005	Kitt Peak	Spacewatch	·	940 m	MPC · JPL
741090	2005 LB_{55}	—	May 7, 2013	Mount Lemmon	Mount Lemmon Survey	·	830 m	MPC · JPL
741091	2005 LK_{55}	—	December 23, 2013	Mount Lemmon	Mount Lemmon Survey	·	2.6 km	MPC · JPL
741092	2005 LY_{55}	—	November 21, 2014	Haleakala	Pan-STARRS 1	·	3.0 km	MPC · JPL
741093	2005 LG_{57}	—	May 16, 2018	Catalina	CSS	·	1.8 km	MPC · JPL
741094	2005 LJ_{59}	—	August 3, 2017	Haleakala	Pan-STARRS 1	NYS	840 m	MPC · JPL
741095	2005 LR_{59}	—	November 27, 2006	Mount Lemmon	Mount Lemmon Survey	·	990 m	MPC · JPL
741096	2005 MT	—	June 17, 2005	Mount Lemmon	Mount Lemmon Survey	·	570 m	MPC · JPL
741097	2005 MR_{11}	—	June 27, 2005	Kitt Peak	Spacewatch	H	500 m	MPC · JPL
741098	2005 MQ_{20}	—	June 30, 2005	Kitt Peak	Spacewatch	·	1.0 km	MPC · JPL
741099	2005 MA_{36}	—	June 30, 2005	Kitt Peak	Spacewatch	·	1.5 km	MPC · JPL
741100	2005 MT_{47}	—	June 29, 2005	Kitt Peak	Spacewatch	·	750 m	MPC · JPL

== 741101–741200 ==
back to top

Designation			Discovery			Properties		Ref
Permanent	Provisional	Named after	Date	Site	Discoverer(s)	Category	Diam.	Ref
741101	2005 MN_{55}	—	January 26, 2011	Mount Lemmon	Mount Lemmon Survey	·	550 m	MPC · JPL
741102	2005 NB_{12}	—	June 3, 2005	Kitt Peak	Spacewatch	·	660 m	MPC · JPL
741103	2005 NG_{17}	—	July 3, 2005	Mount Lemmon	Mount Lemmon Survey	·	1.1 km	MPC · JPL
741104	2005 NW_{36}	—	July 6, 2005	Kitt Peak	Spacewatch	·	1.9 km	MPC · JPL
741105	2005 NJ_{46}	—	July 5, 2005	Mount Lemmon	Mount Lemmon Survey	·	900 m	MPC · JPL
741106	2005 NV_{53}	—	July 10, 2005	Kitt Peak	Spacewatch	·	2.5 km	MPC · JPL
741107	2005 NO_{103}	—	July 7, 2005	Mauna Kea	Veillet, C.	MAS	610 m	MPC · JPL
741108	2005 NR_{118}	—	July 15, 2005	Mount Lemmon	Mount Lemmon Survey	·	2.7 km	MPC · JPL
741109	2005 NG_{129}	—	July 4, 2005	Kitt Peak	Spacewatch	·	830 m	MPC · JPL
741110	2005 NH_{129}	—	January 9, 2011	Mount Lemmon	Mount Lemmon Survey	·	740 m	MPC · JPL
741111	2005 NB_{131}	—	July 12, 2005	Kitt Peak	Spacewatch	·	1.0 km	MPC · JPL
741112	2005 ND_{131}	—	January 28, 2007	Mount Lemmon	Mount Lemmon Survey	·	1.6 km	MPC · JPL
741113	2005 NJ_{131}	—	March 20, 2018	Mount Lemmon	Mount Lemmon Survey	·	1.4 km	MPC · JPL
741114	2005 NN_{131}	—	July 1, 2005	Kitt Peak	Spacewatch	TIN	800 m	MPC · JPL
741115	2005 NQ_{131}	—	February 12, 2018	Haleakala	Pan-STARRS 1	·	1.5 km	MPC · JPL
741116	2005 NM_{133}	—	July 1, 2005	Kitt Peak	Spacewatch	·	2.1 km	MPC · JPL
741117	2005 OQ_{32}	—	July 18, 2005	Palomar	NEAT	JUN	810 m	MPC · JPL
741118	2005 OG_{33}	—	July 18, 2005	Palomar	NEAT	·	940 m	MPC · JPL
741119	2005 OK_{34}	—	February 11, 2018	Haleakala	Pan-STARRS 1	·	1.8 km	MPC · JPL
741120	2005 OL_{34}	—	July 18, 2005	Palomar	NEAT	V	580 m	MPC · JPL
741121	2005 PC_{11}	—	August 4, 2005	Palomar	NEAT	PHO	800 m	MPC · JPL
741122	2005 PF_{14}	—	August 4, 2005	Palomar	NEAT	H	450 m	MPC · JPL
741123	2005 PB_{32}	—	August 9, 2005	Cerro Tololo	Deep Ecliptic Survey	·	3.0 km	MPC · JPL
741124	2005 PF_{32}	—	August 5, 2005	Palomar	NEAT	·	1.0 km	MPC · JPL
741125	2005 QU_{6}	—	August 24, 2005	Palomar	NEAT	·	840 m	MPC · JPL
741126	2005 QN_{11}	—	August 27, 2005	Campo Imperatore	CINEOS	AMO	330 m	MPC · JPL
741127	2005 QZ_{23}	—	August 27, 2005	Kitt Peak	Spacewatch	·	1.2 km	MPC · JPL
741128	2005 QU_{36}	—	August 25, 2005	Palomar	NEAT	·	2.0 km	MPC · JPL
741129	2005 QK_{41}	—	August 26, 2005	Anderson Mesa	LONEOS	PHO	860 m	MPC · JPL
741130	2005 QU_{53}	—	August 28, 2005	Kitt Peak	Spacewatch	·	740 m	MPC · JPL
741131	2005 QQ_{77}	—	August 25, 2005	Palomar	NEAT	·	540 m	MPC · JPL
741132	2005 QU_{77}	—	August 25, 2005	Palomar	NEAT	·	1.2 km	MPC · JPL
741133	2005 QF_{97}	—	July 30, 2005	Palomar	NEAT	·	670 m	MPC · JPL
741134	2005 QL_{109}	—	August 30, 2005	Kitt Peak	Spacewatch	·	2.1 km	MPC · JPL
741135	2005 QE_{124}	—	August 28, 2005	Kitt Peak	Spacewatch	·	920 m	MPC · JPL
741136	2005 QM_{134}	—	August 28, 2005	Kitt Peak	Spacewatch	·	850 m	MPC · JPL
741137	2005 QE_{137}	—	August 28, 2005	Kitt Peak	Spacewatch	·	850 m	MPC · JPL
741138	2005 QS_{137}	—	August 28, 2005	Kitt Peak	Spacewatch	·	1.2 km	MPC · JPL
741139	2005 QN_{144}	—	August 26, 2005	Palomar	NEAT	·	1.7 km	MPC · JPL
741140	2005 QY_{144}	—	August 27, 2005	Palomar	NEAT	·	1.1 km	MPC · JPL
741141	2005 QU_{160}	—	August 28, 2005	Kitt Peak	Spacewatch	·	1.2 km	MPC · JPL
741142	2005 QD_{171}	—	August 31, 2005	Socorro	LINEAR	·	1.3 km	MPC · JPL
741143	2005 QH_{172}	—	September 1, 2005	Kitt Peak	Spacewatch	·	970 m	MPC · JPL
741144	2005 QA_{173}	—	August 29, 2005	Anderson Mesa	LONEOS	·	2.3 km	MPC · JPL
741145	2005 QR_{174}	—	August 31, 2005	Kitt Peak	Spacewatch	H	440 m	MPC · JPL
741146	2005 QX_{175}	—	August 31, 2005	Palomar	NEAT	·	590 m	MPC · JPL
741147	2005 QE_{179}	—	August 25, 2005	Palomar	NEAT	·	980 m	MPC · JPL
741148	2005 QA_{193}	—	September 27, 2009	Kitt Peak	Spacewatch	·	920 m	MPC · JPL
741149	2005 QY_{194}	—	August 25, 2005	Palomar	NEAT	3:2	5.5 km	MPC · JPL
741150	2005 QE_{195}	—	August 15, 2013	Haleakala	Pan-STARRS 1	·	890 m	MPC · JPL
741151	2005 QS_{195}	—	August 28, 2005	Kitt Peak	Spacewatch	·	920 m	MPC · JPL
741152	2005 QT_{195}	—	August 29, 2005	Kitt Peak	Spacewatch	·	730 m	MPC · JPL
741153	2005 QB_{196}	—	March 10, 2007	Kitt Peak	Spacewatch	·	1.6 km	MPC · JPL
741154	2005 QD_{198}	—	August 15, 2014	Haleakala	Pan-STARRS 1	AGN	900 m	MPC · JPL
741155	2005 QF_{198}	—	January 16, 2007	Mount Lemmon	Mount Lemmon Survey	AGN	970 m	MPC · JPL
741156	2005 QA_{199}	—	January 17, 2013	Haleakala	Pan-STARRS 1	EOS	1.8 km	MPC · JPL
741157	2005 QO_{201}	—	August 27, 2005	Palomar	NEAT	·	1.8 km	MPC · JPL
741158	2005 QJ_{203}	—	May 30, 2014	Mount Lemmon	Mount Lemmon Survey	·	1.8 km	MPC · JPL
741159	2005 QH_{207}	—	August 28, 2005	Kitt Peak	Spacewatch	·	2.6 km	MPC · JPL
741160	2005 RQ_{2}	—	September 2, 2005	Palomar	NEAT	H	530 m	MPC · JPL
741161	2005 RN_{5}	—	August 24, 2005	Palomar	NEAT	THB	2.4 km	MPC · JPL
741162	2005 RU_{5}	—	August 31, 2005	Kitt Peak	Spacewatch	·	990 m	MPC · JPL
741163	2005 RE_{22}	—	August 26, 2005	Campo Imperatore	CINEOS	·	960 m	MPC · JPL
741164	2005 RL_{39}	—	August 30, 2005	Palomar	NEAT	·	1.7 km	MPC · JPL
741165	2005 RT_{41}	—	August 30, 2005	Anderson Mesa	LONEOS	·	950 m	MPC · JPL
741166	2005 RJ_{51}	—	September 10, 2005	Anderson Mesa	LONEOS	·	2.4 km	MPC · JPL
741167	2005 RM_{53}	—	September 13, 2005	Kitt Peak	Spacewatch	·	900 m	MPC · JPL
741168	2005 RU_{53}	—	September 2, 2005	Palomar	NEAT	EUN	1.0 km	MPC · JPL
741169	2005 RS_{56}	—	August 25, 2012	Haleakala	Pan-STARRS 1	·	730 m	MPC · JPL
741170	2005 RQ_{57}	—	September 1, 2005	Kitt Peak	Spacewatch	JUN	880 m	MPC · JPL
741171	2005 RC_{59}	—	October 5, 2016	Mount Lemmon	Mount Lemmon Survey	·	1.1 km	MPC · JPL
741172	2005 RV_{61}	—	September 14, 2005	Kitt Peak	Spacewatch	·	770 m	MPC · JPL
741173	2005 SU_{4}	—	August 29, 2005	Kitt Peak	Spacewatch	·	1.8 km	MPC · JPL
741174	2005 SZ_{10}	—	September 23, 2005	Kitt Peak	Spacewatch	·	2.3 km	MPC · JPL
741175	2005 SK_{20}	—	September 13, 2005	Socorro	LINEAR	·	2.0 km	MPC · JPL
741176	2005 SR_{32}	—	August 30, 2005	Palomar	NEAT	·	2.0 km	MPC · JPL
741177	2005 SP_{34}	—	September 23, 2005	Kitt Peak	Spacewatch	·	1.6 km	MPC · JPL
741178	2005 SN_{45}	—	September 24, 2005	Kitt Peak	Spacewatch	·	2.3 km	MPC · JPL
741179	2005 SO_{47}	—	September 24, 2005	Kitt Peak	Spacewatch	·	2.2 km	MPC · JPL
741180	2005 SQ_{51}	—	September 24, 2005	Kitt Peak	Spacewatch	fast	860 m	MPC · JPL
741181	2005 SB_{56}	—	September 25, 2005	Kitt Peak	Spacewatch	H	460 m	MPC · JPL
741182	2005 SZ_{76}	—	September 24, 2005	Kitt Peak	Spacewatch	AEO	1.1 km	MPC · JPL
741183	2005 SD_{79}	—	September 24, 2005	Kitt Peak	Spacewatch	·	790 m	MPC · JPL
741184	2005 SY_{80}	—	September 24, 2005	Kitt Peak	Spacewatch	PHO	670 m	MPC · JPL
741185	2005 SH_{93}	—	September 24, 2005	Kitt Peak	Spacewatch	MAS	610 m	MPC · JPL
741186	2005 SB_{95}	—	August 30, 2005	Palomar	NEAT	·	920 m	MPC · JPL
741187	2005 SM_{97}	—	September 27, 2005	Palomar	NEAT	·	1.6 km	MPC · JPL
741188	2005 SV_{114}	—	September 27, 2005	Kitt Peak	Spacewatch	·	1.1 km	MPC · JPL
741189	2005 SK_{137}	—	September 24, 2005	Kitt Peak	Spacewatch	·	1.6 km	MPC · JPL
741190	2005 SY_{140}	—	September 25, 2005	Kitt Peak	Spacewatch	·	600 m	MPC · JPL
741191	2005 SF_{150}	—	September 25, 2005	Kitt Peak	Spacewatch	·	720 m	MPC · JPL
741192	2005 SZ_{153}	—	September 26, 2005	Kitt Peak	Spacewatch	NYS	720 m	MPC · JPL
741193	2005 ST_{172}	—	September 29, 2005	Kitt Peak	Spacewatch	·	2.0 km	MPC · JPL
741194	2005 SU_{175}	—	September 29, 2005	Kitt Peak	Spacewatch	·	950 m	MPC · JPL
741195	2005 SU_{176}	—	September 29, 2005	Kitt Peak	Spacewatch	(18466)	1.6 km	MPC · JPL
741196	2005 SS_{185}	—	September 29, 2005	Mount Lemmon	Mount Lemmon Survey	THM	1.8 km	MPC · JPL
741197	2005 SP_{194}	—	August 31, 2005	Kitt Peak	Spacewatch	·	830 m	MPC · JPL
741198	2005 SM_{197}	—	August 30, 2005	Kitt Peak	Spacewatch	·	800 m	MPC · JPL
741199	2005 SM_{202}	—	September 13, 2005	Kitt Peak	Spacewatch	·	1.5 km	MPC · JPL
741200	2005 ST_{206}	—	September 30, 2005	Mount Lemmon	Mount Lemmon Survey	·	1.6 km	MPC · JPL

== 741201–741300 ==
back to top

Designation			Discovery			Properties		Ref
Permanent	Provisional	Named after	Date	Site	Discoverer(s)	Category	Diam.	Ref
741201	2005 SN_{210}	—	September 30, 2005	Palomar	NEAT	·	810 m	MPC · JPL
741202	2005 SD_{211}	—	September 23, 2005	Kitt Peak	Spacewatch	·	920 m	MPC · JPL
741203	2005 SS_{214}	—	September 1, 2005	Palomar	NEAT	·	2.0 km	MPC · JPL
741204	2005 SA_{216}	—	September 2, 2005	Palomar	NEAT	H	480 m	MPC · JPL
741205	2005 SS_{216}	—	September 30, 2005	Mount Lemmon	Mount Lemmon Survey	·	1.8 km	MPC · JPL
741206	2005 SC_{231}	—	September 30, 2005	Mount Lemmon	Mount Lemmon Survey	·	1.2 km	MPC · JPL
741207	2005 SR_{234}	—	September 29, 2005	Mount Lemmon	Mount Lemmon Survey	·	1.8 km	MPC · JPL
741208	2005 SZ_{241}	—	September 30, 2005	Kitt Peak	Spacewatch	PHO	560 m	MPC · JPL
741209	2005 SH_{244}	—	September 30, 2005	Mount Lemmon	Mount Lemmon Survey	NYS	750 m	MPC · JPL
741210	2005 SR_{261}	—	August 26, 2005	Campo Imperatore	CINEOS	T_{j} (2.97) · 3:2	4.8 km	MPC · JPL
741211	2005 SL_{269}	—	September 26, 2005	Palomar	NEAT	·	1.0 km	MPC · JPL
741212	2005 SV_{279}	—	September 23, 2005	Catalina	CSS	·	1 km	MPC · JPL
741213	2005 SX_{288}	—	October 25, 2005	Apache Point	SDSS Collaboration	·	1.8 km	MPC · JPL
741214	2005 SN_{294}	—	September 29, 2005	Mount Lemmon	Mount Lemmon Survey	·	560 m	MPC · JPL
741215	2005 SH_{296}	—	September 26, 2009	Kitt Peak	Spacewatch	·	830 m	MPC · JPL
741216	2005 SB_{298}	—	May 7, 2014	Haleakala	Pan-STARRS 1	·	550 m	MPC · JPL
741217	2005 SD_{298}	—	September 26, 2005	Kitt Peak	Spacewatch	·	760 m	MPC · JPL
741218	2005 SC_{299}	—	January 20, 2015	Haleakala	Pan-STARRS 1	·	880 m	MPC · JPL
741219	2005 SP_{299}	—	September 30, 2005	Mount Lemmon	Mount Lemmon Survey	·	1.4 km	MPC · JPL
741220	2005 SK_{301}	—	September 26, 2005	Kitt Peak	Spacewatch	·	890 m	MPC · JPL
741221	2005 TK_{3}	—	October 1, 2005	Socorro	LINEAR	·	740 m	MPC · JPL
741222	2005 TB_{5}	—	October 1, 2005	Mount Lemmon	Mount Lemmon Survey	·	2.3 km	MPC · JPL
741223	2005 TO_{13}	—	June 17, 2005	Mount Lemmon	Mount Lemmon Survey	·	2.2 km	MPC · JPL
741224	2005 TE_{14}	—	August 27, 2005	Palomar	NEAT	·	1.4 km	MPC · JPL
741225	2005 TG_{31}	—	October 1, 2005	Kitt Peak	Spacewatch	·	520 m	MPC · JPL
741226	2005 TM_{33}	—	October 1, 2005	Kitt Peak	Spacewatch	THM	1.6 km	MPC · JPL
741227	2005 TA_{34}	—	October 1, 2005	Kitt Peak	Spacewatch	TIN	800 m	MPC · JPL
741228	2005 TW_{37}	—	October 1, 2005	Mount Lemmon	Mount Lemmon Survey	·	810 m	MPC · JPL
741229	2005 TO_{39}	—	October 1, 2005	Catalina	CSS	PHO	1.0 km	MPC · JPL
741230	2005 TT_{43}	—	August 30, 2005	Palomar	NEAT	·	940 m	MPC · JPL
741231	2005 TG_{49}	—	October 2, 2005	Palomar	NEAT	·	1.9 km	MPC · JPL
741232	2005 TU_{50}	—	October 12, 2005	Socorro	LINEAR	APO · PHA	180 m	MPC · JPL
741233	2005 TY_{52}	—	September 14, 2005	Catalina	CSS	·	910 m	MPC · JPL
741234	2005 TU_{57}	—	September 23, 2005	Kitt Peak	Spacewatch	PHO	800 m	MPC · JPL
741235	2005 TB_{63}	—	September 25, 2005	Kitt Peak	Spacewatch	·	1.6 km	MPC · JPL
741236	2005 TC_{65}	—	October 1, 2005	Mount Lemmon	Mount Lemmon Survey	·	2.3 km	MPC · JPL
741237	2005 TA_{66}	—	September 25, 2005	Kitt Peak	Spacewatch	·	870 m	MPC · JPL
741238	2005 TC_{68}	—	September 26, 2005	Kitt Peak	Spacewatch	·	1.3 km	MPC · JPL
741239	2005 TN_{78}	—	September 23, 2005	Kitt Peak	Spacewatch	AEO	1.0 km	MPC · JPL
741240	2005 TY_{83}	—	October 3, 2005	Kitt Peak	Spacewatch	·	1.5 km	MPC · JPL
741241	2005 TQ_{88}	—	September 23, 2005	Kitt Peak	Spacewatch	V	470 m	MPC · JPL
741242	2005 TN_{133}	—	October 9, 2005	Kitt Peak	Spacewatch	·	800 m	MPC · JPL
741243	2005 TG_{143}	—	September 29, 2005	Kitt Peak	Spacewatch	·	540 m	MPC · JPL
741244	2005 TJ_{163}	—	October 9, 2005	Kitt Peak	Spacewatch	·	570 m	MPC · JPL
741245	2005 TQ_{188}	—	October 1, 2005	Mount Lemmon	Mount Lemmon Survey	·	1.3 km	MPC · JPL
741246	2005 TJ_{199}	—	October 1, 2005	Mount Lemmon	Mount Lemmon Survey	·	770 m	MPC · JPL
741247	2005 TZ_{199}	—	October 5, 2005	Catalina	CSS	·	1.0 km	MPC · JPL
741248	2005 TR_{202}	—	September 30, 2005	Mount Lemmon	Mount Lemmon Survey	AGN	1.1 km	MPC · JPL
741249	2005 TR_{204}	—	January 10, 2007	Kitt Peak	Spacewatch	·	1.7 km	MPC · JPL
741250	2005 TG_{208}	—	October 9, 2005	Kitt Peak	Spacewatch	·	480 m	MPC · JPL
741251	2005 UV_{50}	—	October 23, 2005	Catalina	CSS	·	1.2 km	MPC · JPL
741252	2005 UQ_{57}	—	September 29, 2005	Kitt Peak	Spacewatch	·	1.2 km	MPC · JPL
741253	2005 UJ_{62}	—	October 25, 2005	Mount Lemmon	Mount Lemmon Survey	·	1.0 km	MPC · JPL
741254	2005 UA_{82}	—	October 9, 2005	Kitt Peak	Spacewatch	·	760 m	MPC · JPL
741255	2005 UO_{85}	—	October 22, 2005	Kitt Peak	Spacewatch	·	830 m	MPC · JPL
741256	2005 US_{89}	—	October 22, 2005	Kitt Peak	Spacewatch	·	930 m	MPC · JPL
741257	2005 UL_{120}	—	October 24, 2005	Kitt Peak	Spacewatch	KOR	1.1 km	MPC · JPL
741258	2005 US_{121}	—	October 24, 2005	Kitt Peak	Spacewatch	·	1.3 km	MPC · JPL
741259	2005 UT_{122}	—	October 24, 2005	Kitt Peak	Spacewatch	NYS	910 m	MPC · JPL
741260	2005 UU_{132}	—	October 9, 2005	Siding Spring	SSS	·	1.5 km	MPC · JPL
741261	2005 UK_{133}	—	September 29, 2005	Mount Lemmon	Mount Lemmon Survey	·	1.6 km	MPC · JPL
741262	2005 UT_{164}	—	October 1, 2005	Mount Lemmon	Mount Lemmon Survey	NYS	980 m	MPC · JPL
741263	2005 UG_{179}	—	October 24, 2005	Kitt Peak	Spacewatch	·	530 m	MPC · JPL
741264	2005 UK_{195}	—	October 22, 2005	Kitt Peak	Spacewatch	H	420 m	MPC · JPL
741265	2005 UC_{209}	—	October 6, 2005	Mount Lemmon	Mount Lemmon Survey	·	1.1 km	MPC · JPL
741266	2005 UF_{211}	—	October 27, 2005	Kitt Peak	Spacewatch	MAS	540 m	MPC · JPL
741267	2005 UG_{213}	—	October 28, 2005	Mount Lemmon	Mount Lemmon Survey	·	890 m	MPC · JPL
741268	2005 UC_{215}	—	October 5, 2005	Catalina	CSS	·	930 m	MPC · JPL
741269	2005 UD_{219}	—	October 25, 2005	Kitt Peak	Spacewatch	V	490 m	MPC · JPL
741270	2005 UE_{223}	—	October 25, 2005	Kitt Peak	Spacewatch	·	1.6 km	MPC · JPL
741271	2005 UD_{235}	—	October 25, 2005	Kitt Peak	Spacewatch	·	1.6 km	MPC · JPL
741272	2005 UE_{245}	—	October 25, 2005	Kitt Peak	Spacewatch	·	960 m	MPC · JPL
741273	2005 UN_{249}	—	October 28, 2005	Mount Lemmon	Mount Lemmon Survey	PHO	790 m	MPC · JPL
741274	2005 UO_{265}	—	October 27, 2005	Kitt Peak	Spacewatch	·	1.1 km	MPC · JPL
741275	2005 UN_{272}	—	October 28, 2005	Kitt Peak	Spacewatch	·	1.1 km	MPC · JPL
741276	2005 UK_{293}	—	October 26, 2005	Kitt Peak	Spacewatch	·	930 m	MPC · JPL
741277	2005 UO_{300}	—	October 26, 2005	Kitt Peak	Spacewatch	H	530 m	MPC · JPL
741278	2005 UU_{310}	—	October 1, 2005	Kitt Peak	Spacewatch	·	810 m	MPC · JPL
741279	2005 UC_{312}	—	October 29, 2005	Mount Lemmon	Mount Lemmon Survey	·	2.2 km	MPC · JPL
741280	2005 UT_{323}	—	October 28, 2005	Mount Lemmon	Mount Lemmon Survey	·	1.5 km	MPC · JPL
741281	2005 UZ_{355}	—	October 30, 2005	Kitt Peak	Spacewatch	·	1.8 km	MPC · JPL
741282	2005 UO_{356}	—	October 24, 2005	Kitt Peak	Spacewatch	MAS	580 m	MPC · JPL
741283	2005 UO_{360}	—	October 26, 2005	Kitt Peak	Spacewatch	·	2.0 km	MPC · JPL
741284	2005 UA_{361}	—	October 27, 2005	Kitt Peak	Spacewatch	·	740 m	MPC · JPL
741285	2005 UU_{364}	—	September 12, 1994	Kitt Peak	Spacewatch	·	950 m	MPC · JPL
741286	2005 UG_{366}	—	October 27, 2005	Kitt Peak	Spacewatch	·	580 m	MPC · JPL
741287	2005 UG_{377}	—	October 27, 2005	Kitt Peak	Spacewatch	·	1.6 km	MPC · JPL
741288	2005 UF_{379}	—	October 22, 2005	Kitt Peak	Spacewatch	·	800 m	MPC · JPL
741289	2005 UJ_{380}	—	October 22, 2005	Kitt Peak	Spacewatch	THM	1.7 km	MPC · JPL
741290	2005 UG_{383}	—	October 27, 2005	Kitt Peak	Spacewatch	·	1.8 km	MPC · JPL
741291	2005 UG_{385}	—	October 27, 2005	Kitt Peak	Spacewatch	·	840 m	MPC · JPL
741292	2005 UD_{386}	—	October 22, 2005	Kitt Peak	Spacewatch	AGN	900 m	MPC · JPL
741293	2005 UW_{391}	—	October 30, 2005	Kitt Peak	Spacewatch	·	830 m	MPC · JPL
741294	2005 UA_{401}	—	October 27, 2005	Kitt Peak	Spacewatch	·	2.1 km	MPC · JPL
741295	2005 UW_{424}	—	October 28, 2005	Kitt Peak	Spacewatch	·	1.2 km	MPC · JPL
741296	2005 UZ_{441}	—	October 23, 2005	Palomar	NEAT	·	1.3 km	MPC · JPL
741297	2005 UY_{449}	—	September 30, 2005	Kitt Peak	Spacewatch	·	2.3 km	MPC · JPL
741298	2005 UM_{453}	—	October 29, 2005	Kitt Peak	Spacewatch	·	1.6 km	MPC · JPL
741299	2005 UP_{464}	—	October 30, 2005	Kitt Peak	Spacewatch	·	800 m	MPC · JPL
741300	2005 UR_{467}	—	October 30, 2005	Kitt Peak	Spacewatch	·	1.0 km	MPC · JPL

== 741301–741400 ==
back to top

Designation			Discovery			Properties		Ref
Permanent	Provisional	Named after	Date	Site	Discoverer(s)	Category	Diam.	Ref
741301	2005 UB_{468}	—	October 30, 2005	Kitt Peak	Spacewatch	·	1.4 km	MPC · JPL
741302	2005 UP_{492}	—	September 25, 2005	Kitt Peak	Spacewatch	NYS	930 m	MPC · JPL
741303	2005 UO_{516}	—	September 30, 2005	Mount Lemmon	Mount Lemmon Survey	·	1.4 km	MPC · JPL
741304	2005 UU_{517}	—	October 25, 2005	Apache Point	SDSS Collaboration	·	1.8 km	MPC · JPL
741305	2005 UG_{525}	—	October 27, 2005	Catalina	CSS	·	2.0 km	MPC · JPL
741306 Marshallmccall	2005 UK_{525}	Marshallmccall	October 27, 2005	Mauna Kea	P. A. Wiegert, D. D. Balam	PHO	690 m	MPC · JPL
741307	2005 UU_{525}	—	October 25, 2005	Mount Lemmon	Mount Lemmon Survey	·	1.9 km	MPC · JPL
741308	2005 UK_{526}	—	October 28, 2005	Mount Lemmon	Mount Lemmon Survey	PHO	830 m	MPC · JPL
741309	2005 UN_{528}	—	March 13, 2003	Kitt Peak	Spacewatch	MAS	570 m	MPC · JPL
741310	2005 UJ_{533}	—	October 5, 2005	Catalina	CSS	·	910 m	MPC · JPL
741311	2005 UQ_{535}	—	April 30, 2011	Mount Lemmon	Mount Lemmon Survey	V	420 m	MPC · JPL
741312	2005 UB_{537}	—	October 28, 2005	Mount Lemmon	Mount Lemmon Survey	HNS	1.1 km	MPC · JPL
741313	2005 UF_{541}	—	October 29, 2005	Kitt Peak	Spacewatch	NYS	810 m	MPC · JPL
741314	2005 UN_{541}	—	October 27, 2005	Kitt Peak	Spacewatch	·	550 m	MPC · JPL
741315	2005 UU_{541}	—	September 30, 2005	Mount Lemmon	Mount Lemmon Survey	·	610 m	MPC · JPL
741316	2005 UW_{541}	—	September 28, 2013	Piszkéstető	K. Sárneczky	H	410 m	MPC · JPL
741317	2005 UL_{542}	—	September 16, 2009	Mount Lemmon	Mount Lemmon Survey	·	1.3 km	MPC · JPL
741318	2005 UZ_{542}	—	September 20, 2014	Haleakala	Pan-STARRS 1	ADE	1.3 km	MPC · JPL
741319	2005 UU_{546}	—	January 17, 2013	Mount Lemmon	Mount Lemmon Survey	·	510 m	MPC · JPL
741320	2005 UU_{547}	—	October 30, 2005	Kitt Peak	Spacewatch	·	1.3 km	MPC · JPL
741321	2005 VE_{12}	—	October 27, 2005	Kitt Peak	Spacewatch	·	1.0 km	MPC · JPL
741322	2005 VR_{14}	—	November 3, 2005	Catalina	CSS	·	1.1 km	MPC · JPL
741323	2005 VQ_{20}	—	November 1, 2005	Kitt Peak	Spacewatch	MAS	590 m	MPC · JPL
741324	2005 VZ_{20}	—	November 1, 2005	Kitt Peak	Spacewatch	·	840 m	MPC · JPL
741325	2005 VQ_{27}	—	October 27, 2005	Kitt Peak	Spacewatch	·	1.9 km	MPC · JPL
741326	2005 VF_{35}	—	November 3, 2005	Mount Lemmon	Mount Lemmon Survey	·	1.1 km	MPC · JPL
741327	2005 VP_{41}	—	October 27, 2005	Anderson Mesa	LONEOS	PHO	840 m	MPC · JPL
741328	2005 VS_{47}	—	November 5, 2005	Kitt Peak	Spacewatch	KOR	950 m	MPC · JPL
741329	2005 VZ_{51}	—	November 3, 2005	Mount Lemmon	Mount Lemmon Survey	·	1.5 km	MPC · JPL
741330	2005 VH_{75}	—	November 3, 2005	Kitt Peak	Spacewatch	·	1.1 km	MPC · JPL
741331	2005 VB_{83}	—	November 3, 2005	Mount Lemmon	Mount Lemmon Survey	·	910 m	MPC · JPL
741332	2005 VC_{89}	—	April 24, 2003	Kitt Peak	Spacewatch	·	1.1 km	MPC · JPL
741333	2005 VS_{94}	—	November 6, 2005	Kitt Peak	Spacewatch	·	1.5 km	MPC · JPL
741334	2005 VQ_{97}	—	November 5, 2005	Kitt Peak	Spacewatch	DOR	1.9 km	MPC · JPL
741335	2005 VE_{116}	—	December 20, 2001	Apache Point	SDSS	·	1.5 km	MPC · JPL
741336	2005 VQ_{128}	—	October 30, 2005	Apache Point	SDSS Collaboration	·	880 m	MPC · JPL
741337	2005 VF_{132}	—	November 9, 2005	Apache Point	SDSS Collaboration	·	1.8 km	MPC · JPL
741338	2005 VU_{135}	—	November 12, 2005	Catalina	CSS	·	1.6 km	MPC · JPL
741339	2005 VW_{135}	—	November 4, 2005	Kitt Peak	Spacewatch	·	1.0 km	MPC · JPL
741340	2005 VC_{144}	—	August 2, 2016	Haleakala	Pan-STARRS 1	·	950 m	MPC · JPL
741341	2005 VF_{147}	—	May 15, 2012	Haleakala	Pan-STARRS 1	·	890 m	MPC · JPL
741342	2005 VH_{147}	—	May 21, 2015	Haleakala	Pan-STARRS 1	·	570 m	MPC · JPL
741343	2005 VU_{147}	—	November 7, 2005	Mauna Kea	A. Boattini	·	2.6 km	MPC · JPL
741344	2005 VP_{152}	—	November 12, 2005	Kitt Peak	Spacewatch	·	910 m	MPC · JPL
741345	2005 VM_{153}	—	November 4, 2005	Kitt Peak	Spacewatch	·	1.1 km	MPC · JPL
741346	2005 WR_{10}	—	November 22, 2005	Kitt Peak	Spacewatch	·	1.4 km	MPC · JPL
741347	2005 WP_{14}	—	October 27, 2005	Mount Lemmon	Mount Lemmon Survey	·	680 m	MPC · JPL
741348	2005 WW_{14}	—	November 22, 2005	Kitt Peak	Spacewatch	·	1.4 km	MPC · JPL
741349	2005 WA_{20}	—	October 30, 2005	Mount Lemmon	Mount Lemmon Survey	·	1.0 km	MPC · JPL
741350	2005 WL_{29}	—	November 12, 2005	Kitt Peak	Spacewatch	·	830 m	MPC · JPL
741351	2005 WC_{37}	—	November 22, 2005	Kitt Peak	Spacewatch	·	1.9 km	MPC · JPL
741352	2005 WW_{39}	—	November 25, 2005	Mount Lemmon	Mount Lemmon Survey	·	830 m	MPC · JPL
741353	2005 WC_{40}	—	November 25, 2005	Mount Lemmon	Mount Lemmon Survey	·	2.3 km	MPC · JPL
741354	2005 WE_{45}	—	October 25, 2005	Mount Lemmon	Mount Lemmon Survey	·	790 m	MPC · JPL
741355	2005 WC_{49}	—	November 25, 2005	Kitt Peak	Spacewatch	·	780 m	MPC · JPL
741356	2005 WZ_{50}	—	November 22, 2005	Kitt Peak	Spacewatch	H	410 m	MPC · JPL
741357	2005 WH_{51}	—	November 25, 2005	Kitt Peak	Spacewatch	·	970 m	MPC · JPL
741358	2005 WS_{53}	—	November 25, 2005	Mount Lemmon	Mount Lemmon Survey	·	1.2 km	MPC · JPL
741359	2005 WG_{55}	—	September 30, 2005	Mount Lemmon	Mount Lemmon Survey	·	990 m	MPC · JPL
741360	2005 WT_{89}	—	November 3, 2005	Catalina	CSS	PHO	1.1 km	MPC · JPL
741361	2005 WP_{95}	—	November 26, 2005	Kitt Peak	Spacewatch	·	970 m	MPC · JPL
741362	2005 WX_{99}	—	November 10, 2005	Mount Lemmon	Mount Lemmon Survey	·	1.0 km	MPC · JPL
741363	2005 WX_{100}	—	October 28, 2005	Mount Lemmon	Mount Lemmon Survey	·	1.2 km	MPC · JPL
741364	2005 WA_{104}	—	October 28, 2005	Mount Lemmon	Mount Lemmon Survey	·	1.6 km	MPC · JPL
741365	2005 WW_{113}	—	September 28, 2001	Palomar	NEAT	ERI	1.4 km	MPC · JPL
741366	2005 WL_{139}	—	November 26, 2005	Mount Lemmon	Mount Lemmon Survey	AST	1.4 km	MPC · JPL
741367	2005 WR_{150}	—	November 28, 2005	Kitt Peak	Spacewatch	·	960 m	MPC · JPL
741368	2005 WN_{157}	—	November 25, 2005	Mount Lemmon	Mount Lemmon Survey	·	1.8 km	MPC · JPL
741369	2005 WN_{159}	—	November 26, 2005	Catalina	CSS	·	1.1 km	MPC · JPL
741370	2005 WK_{167}	—	November 10, 2005	Mount Lemmon	Mount Lemmon Survey	NYS	1.2 km	MPC · JPL
741371	2005 WD_{170}	—	November 22, 2005	Kitt Peak	Spacewatch	·	1.2 km	MPC · JPL
741372	2005 WE_{182}	—	January 13, 2002	Kitt Peak	Spacewatch	·	1.2 km	MPC · JPL
741373	2005 WO_{190}	—	November 5, 2005	Socorro	LINEAR	·	1.7 km	MPC · JPL
741374	2005 WR_{193}	—	November 28, 2005	Palomar	NEAT	·	1.4 km	MPC · JPL
741375	2005 WP_{213}	—	November 30, 2005	Kitt Peak	Spacewatch	NYS	980 m	MPC · JPL
741376	2005 WN_{214}	—	February 28, 2014	Haleakala	Pan-STARRS 1	·	830 m	MPC · JPL
741377	2005 WU_{214}	—	August 28, 2014	Kitt Peak	Spacewatch	KOR	990 m	MPC · JPL
741378	2005 WK_{217}	—	November 22, 2005	Kitt Peak	Spacewatch	·	1.6 km	MPC · JPL
741379	2005 WC_{219}	—	November 22, 2005	Kitt Peak	Spacewatch	·	960 m	MPC · JPL
741380	2005 XL_{3}	—	November 21, 2005	Catalina	CSS	·	2.4 km	MPC · JPL
741381	2005 XL_{12}	—	December 1, 2005	Kitt Peak	Spacewatch	·	580 m	MPC · JPL
741382	2005 XA_{13}	—	December 1, 2005	Kitt Peak	Spacewatch	·	980 m	MPC · JPL
741383	2005 XY_{20}	—	November 25, 2005	Mount Lemmon	Mount Lemmon Survey	·	860 m	MPC · JPL
741384	2005 XN_{23}	—	December 2, 2005	Mount Lemmon	Mount Lemmon Survey	·	910 m	MPC · JPL
741385	2005 XK_{30}	—	December 1, 2005	Kitt Peak	Spacewatch	·	1.5 km	MPC · JPL
741386	2005 XP_{46}	—	December 2, 2005	Kitt Peak	Spacewatch	·	1.4 km	MPC · JPL
741387	2005 XN_{57}	—	November 10, 2005	Mount Lemmon	Mount Lemmon Survey	·	2.0 km	MPC · JPL
741388	2005 XN_{65}	—	November 22, 2005	Kitt Peak	Spacewatch	·	1.7 km	MPC · JPL
741389	2005 XF_{71}	—	December 6, 2005	Kitt Peak	Spacewatch	·	1.1 km	MPC · JPL
741390	2005 XY_{75}	—	November 29, 2005	Kitt Peak	Spacewatch	·	800 m	MPC · JPL
741391	2005 XC_{76}	—	December 7, 2005	Kitt Peak	Spacewatch	·	720 m	MPC · JPL
741392	2005 XY_{98}	—	December 1, 2005	Kitt Peak	Wasserman, L. H., Millis, R. L.	·	620 m	MPC · JPL
741393	2005 XK_{114}	—	October 28, 2005	Mount Lemmon	Mount Lemmon Survey	MAS	510 m	MPC · JPL
741394	2005 XO_{126}	—	November 9, 2009	Mount Lemmon	Mount Lemmon Survey	EUN	910 m	MPC · JPL
741395	2005 XT_{131}	—	October 26, 2014	Mount Lemmon	Mount Lemmon Survey	GEF	960 m	MPC · JPL
741396	2005 XT_{133}	—	December 10, 2005	Kitt Peak	Spacewatch	·	980 m	MPC · JPL
741397	2005 XA_{134}	—	December 1, 2005	Mount Lemmon	Mount Lemmon Survey	·	960 m	MPC · JPL
741398	2005 XB_{135}	—	December 5, 2005	Kitt Peak	Spacewatch	·	1.6 km	MPC · JPL
741399	2005 YH_{4}	—	December 24, 2005	Kitt Peak	Spacewatch	·	770 m	MPC · JPL
741400	2005 YA_{11}	—	November 22, 2005	Kitt Peak	Spacewatch	·	550 m	MPC · JPL

== 741401–741500 ==
back to top

Designation			Discovery			Properties		Ref
Permanent	Provisional	Named after	Date	Site	Discoverer(s)	Category	Diam.	Ref
741401	2005 YF_{28}	—	December 5, 2005	Mount Lemmon	Mount Lemmon Survey	·	910 m	MPC · JPL
741402	2005 YR_{41}	—	December 22, 2005	Kitt Peak	Spacewatch	·	1.5 km	MPC · JPL
741403	2005 YG_{73}	—	December 24, 2005	Kitt Peak	Spacewatch	NYS	960 m	MPC · JPL
741404	2005 YL_{73}	—	December 5, 2005	Mount Lemmon	Mount Lemmon Survey	MAS	530 m	MPC · JPL
741405	2005 YQ_{74}	—	December 24, 2005	Kitt Peak	Spacewatch	·	1.1 km	MPC · JPL
741406	2005 YM_{80}	—	December 24, 2005	Kitt Peak	Spacewatch	·	1.8 km	MPC · JPL
741407	2005 YZ_{97}	—	December 24, 2005	Kitt Peak	Spacewatch	·	1.1 km	MPC · JPL
741408	2005 YM_{99}	—	December 5, 2005	Mount Lemmon	Mount Lemmon Survey	MAS	570 m	MPC · JPL
741409	2005 YJ_{104}	—	October 13, 2001	Kitt Peak	Spacewatch	·	740 m	MPC · JPL
741410	2005 YM_{104}	—	December 25, 2005	Kitt Peak	Spacewatch	·	1.3 km	MPC · JPL
741411	2005 YL_{115}	—	December 25, 2005	Kitt Peak	Spacewatch	·	520 m	MPC · JPL
741412	2005 YK_{144}	—	December 28, 2005	Mount Lemmon	Mount Lemmon Survey	·	920 m	MPC · JPL
741413	2005 YY_{147}	—	December 24, 2005	Kitt Peak	Spacewatch	·	1.4 km	MPC · JPL
741414	2005 YX_{149}	—	December 25, 2005	Kitt Peak	Spacewatch	NYS	1.1 km	MPC · JPL
741415	2005 YE_{150}	—	December 25, 2005	Kitt Peak	Spacewatch	·	980 m	MPC · JPL
741416	2005 YQ_{166}	—	December 27, 2005	Kitt Peak	Spacewatch	·	1.4 km	MPC · JPL
741417	2005 YW_{174}	—	December 29, 2005	Palomar	NEAT	H	550 m	MPC · JPL
741418	2005 YV_{175}	—	December 22, 2005	Kitt Peak	Spacewatch	·	1.1 km	MPC · JPL
741419	2005 YL_{189}	—	December 29, 2005	Kitt Peak	Spacewatch	·	1.8 km	MPC · JPL
741420	2005 YZ_{199}	—	December 26, 2005	Mount Lemmon	Mount Lemmon Survey	·	1.2 km	MPC · JPL
741421	2005 YW_{215}	—	December 29, 2005	Mount Lemmon	Mount Lemmon Survey	·	1.4 km	MPC · JPL
741422	2005 YR_{253}	—	December 29, 2005	Kitt Peak	Spacewatch	·	1.0 km	MPC · JPL
741423	2005 YB_{270}	—	December 26, 2005	Mount Lemmon	Mount Lemmon Survey	·	2.9 km	MPC · JPL
741424	2005 YX_{270}	—	December 28, 2005	Kitt Peak	Spacewatch	EOS	1.6 km	MPC · JPL
741425	2005 YO_{275}	—	October 25, 2005	Mount Lemmon	Mount Lemmon Survey	·	560 m	MPC · JPL
741426	2005 YC_{276}	—	December 21, 2005	Kitt Peak	Spacewatch	·	1.2 km	MPC · JPL
741427	2005 YM_{277}	—	December 8, 2005	Kitt Peak	Spacewatch	·	1.7 km	MPC · JPL
741428	2005 YU_{277}	—	November 30, 2005	Mount Lemmon	Mount Lemmon Survey	NYS	930 m	MPC · JPL
741429	2005 YR_{281}	—	December 26, 2005	Kitt Peak	Spacewatch	·	1.1 km	MPC · JPL
741430	2005 YP_{295}	—	September 12, 2012	Siding Spring	SSS	·	990 m	MPC · JPL
741431	2005 YF_{296}	—	February 13, 2013	Haleakala	Pan-STARRS 1	·	1.8 km	MPC · JPL
741432	2005 YR_{296}	—	July 23, 2015	Haleakala	Pan-STARRS 1	·	860 m	MPC · JPL
741433	2005 YY_{296}	—	May 3, 2011	Kitt Peak	Spacewatch	·	1 km	MPC · JPL
741434	2005 YP_{297}	—	December 25, 2005	Mount Lemmon	Mount Lemmon Survey	·	510 m	MPC · JPL
741435	2005 YG_{299}	—	December 30, 2005	Mount Lemmon	Mount Lemmon Survey	·	980 m	MPC · JPL
741436	2005 YB_{300}	—	December 29, 2005	Kitt Peak	Spacewatch	KOR	1.1 km	MPC · JPL
741437	2006 AW_{2}	—	January 4, 2006	Gnosca	S. Sposetti	·	540 m	MPC · JPL
741438	2006 AA_{16}	—	August 20, 2004	Kitt Peak	Spacewatch	·	1.7 km	MPC · JPL
741439	2006 AG_{24}	—	December 28, 2005	Mount Lemmon	Mount Lemmon Survey	·	2.4 km	MPC · JPL
741440	2006 AM_{41}	—	January 4, 2006	Kitt Peak	Spacewatch	H	520 m	MPC · JPL
741441	2006 AK_{52}	—	January 5, 2006	Kitt Peak	Spacewatch	3:2	4.2 km	MPC · JPL
741442	2006 AL_{90}	—	January 6, 2006	Kitt Peak	Spacewatch	·	1.6 km	MPC · JPL
741443	2006 AQ_{102}	—	January 7, 2006	Mauna Kea	P. A. Wiegert, D. D. Balam	L5	7.7 km	MPC · JPL
741444 Abbasi	2006 AW_{102}	Abbasi	January 7, 2006	Mauna Kea	P. A. Wiegert, D. D. Balam	T_{j} (2.95)	2.0 km	MPC · JPL
741445	2006 AK_{110}	—	January 7, 2006	Mount Lemmon	Mount Lemmon Survey	·	1.1 km	MPC · JPL
741446	2006 AR_{112}	—	January 7, 2006	Kitt Peak	Spacewatch	NYS	990 m	MPC · JPL
741447	2006 AN_{113}	—	January 4, 2006	Kitt Peak	Spacewatch	H	400 m	MPC · JPL
741448	2006 AW_{113}	—	January 6, 2006	Kitt Peak	Spacewatch	·	1.9 km	MPC · JPL
741449	2006 AL_{114}	—	November 26, 2016	Haleakala	Pan-STARRS 1	H	460 m	MPC · JPL
741450	2006 AE_{117}	—	January 7, 2006	Mount Lemmon	Mount Lemmon Survey	·	2.4 km	MPC · JPL
741451	2006 BE	—	January 9, 2006	Anderson Mesa	LONEOS	PHO	830 m	MPC · JPL
741452	2006 BY_{63}	—	January 22, 2006	Catalina	CSS	·	1.4 km	MPC · JPL
741453	2006 BF_{70}	—	January 23, 2006	Kitt Peak	Spacewatch	·	2.4 km	MPC · JPL
741454	2006 BP_{71}	—	January 23, 2006	Kitt Peak	Spacewatch	·	900 m	MPC · JPL
741455	2006 BJ_{75}	—	January 23, 2006	Kitt Peak	Spacewatch	HYG	2.3 km	MPC · JPL
741456	2006 BX_{116}	—	January 26, 2006	Kitt Peak	Spacewatch	V	600 m	MPC · JPL
741457	2006 BN_{141}	—	January 25, 2006	Kitt Peak	Spacewatch	·	1.5 km	MPC · JPL
741458	2006 BG_{146}	—	January 22, 2006	Mount Lemmon	Mount Lemmon Survey	·	1.9 km	MPC · JPL
741459	2006 BS_{170}	—	January 6, 2006	Kitt Peak	Spacewatch	·	1.1 km	MPC · JPL
741460	2006 BH_{177}	—	January 27, 2006	Kitt Peak	Spacewatch	·	1.3 km	MPC · JPL
741461	2006 BT_{177}	—	January 27, 2006	Mount Lemmon	Mount Lemmon Survey	·	520 m	MPC · JPL
741462	2006 BN_{225}	—	November 7, 2005	Mauna Kea	A. Boattini	·	1.8 km	MPC · JPL
741463	2006 BT_{241}	—	January 31, 2006	Kitt Peak	Spacewatch	·	980 m	MPC · JPL
741464	2006 BO_{256}	—	January 31, 2006	Kitt Peak	Spacewatch	BRA	980 m	MPC · JPL
741465	2006 BS_{264}	—	January 31, 2006	Kitt Peak	Spacewatch	L5	7.3 km	MPC · JPL
741466	2006 BN_{284}	—	February 22, 2017	Mount Lemmon	Mount Lemmon Survey	·	1.7 km	MPC · JPL
741467	2006 BF_{287}	—	January 23, 2006	Kitt Peak	Spacewatch	·	980 m	MPC · JPL
741468	2006 BF_{288}	—	January 28, 2017	Haleakala	Pan-STARRS 1	·	1.5 km	MPC · JPL
741469	2006 BD_{289}	—	January 23, 2006	Kitt Peak	Spacewatch	·	1.3 km	MPC · JPL
741470	2006 BV_{293}	—	January 28, 2006	Mount Lemmon	Mount Lemmon Survey	·	1.0 km	MPC · JPL
741471	2006 BB_{294}	—	January 23, 2006	Kitt Peak	Spacewatch	·	1.1 km	MPC · JPL
741472	2006 BM_{295}	—	January 27, 2006	Mount Lemmon	Mount Lemmon Survey	·	2.4 km	MPC · JPL
741473	2006 BS_{296}	—	November 22, 2014	Mount Lemmon	Mount Lemmon Survey	·	610 m	MPC · JPL
741474	2006 BD_{304}	—	January 30, 2006	Kitt Peak	Spacewatch	L5	9.3 km	MPC · JPL
741475	2006 CZ_{11}	—	February 1, 2006	Kitt Peak	Spacewatch	H	510 m	MPC · JPL
741476	2006 CC_{69}	—	February 4, 2006	Kitt Peak	Spacewatch	L5	7.4 km	MPC · JPL
741477	2006 CY_{80}	—	February 1, 2006	Kitt Peak	Spacewatch	·	920 m	MPC · JPL
741478	2006 CW_{82}	—	October 2, 2008	Mount Lemmon	Mount Lemmon Survey	·	830 m	MPC · JPL
741479	2006 CE_{83}	—	February 4, 2006	Kitt Peak	Spacewatch	URS	2.3 km	MPC · JPL
741480	2006 CR_{84}	—	January 27, 2011	Mount Lemmon	Mount Lemmon Survey	·	1.7 km	MPC · JPL
741481	2006 CB_{85}	—	February 6, 2006	Mount Lemmon	Mount Lemmon Survey	·	2.0 km	MPC · JPL
741482	2006 CY_{85}	—	March 4, 2017	Haleakala	Pan-STARRS 1	EUP	2.9 km	MPC · JPL
741483	2006 CR_{86}	—	August 28, 2014	Haleakala	Pan-STARRS 1	EOS	1.3 km	MPC · JPL
741484	2006 DT_{34}	—	February 20, 2006	Kitt Peak	Spacewatch	·	2.8 km	MPC · JPL
741485	2006 DT_{38}	—	February 21, 2006	Mount Lemmon	Mount Lemmon Survey	H	410 m	MPC · JPL
741486	2006 DR_{39}	—	January 23, 2006	Kitt Peak	Spacewatch	·	880 m	MPC · JPL
741487	2006 DY_{41}	—	January 26, 2006	Catalina	CSS	T_{j} (2.92)	2.7 km	MPC · JPL
741488	2006 DA_{48}	—	February 21, 2006	Mount Lemmon	Mount Lemmon Survey	·	1.1 km	MPC · JPL
741489	2006 DR_{51}	—	January 5, 2006	Mount Lemmon	Mount Lemmon Survey	·	1.6 km	MPC · JPL
741490	2006 DA_{55}	—	February 24, 2006	Kitt Peak	Spacewatch	MAR	890 m	MPC · JPL
741491	2006 DU_{62}	—	February 25, 2006	Catalina	CSS	APO +1km · PHA	900 m	MPC · JPL
741492	2006 DE_{68}	—	February 7, 2006	Mount Lemmon	Mount Lemmon Survey	·	2.7 km	MPC · JPL
741493	2006 DL_{87}	—	February 24, 2006	Kitt Peak	Spacewatch	·	500 m	MPC · JPL
741494	2006 DP_{102}	—	February 25, 2006	Mount Lemmon	Mount Lemmon Survey	H	430 m	MPC · JPL
741495	2006 DP_{106}	—	February 25, 2006	Mount Lemmon	Mount Lemmon Survey	·	1.5 km	MPC · JPL
741496	2006 DG_{115}	—	December 3, 2005	Mauna Kea	A. Boattini	·	1.3 km	MPC · JPL
741497	2006 DB_{139}	—	February 4, 2006	Mount Lemmon	Mount Lemmon Survey	·	1.2 km	MPC · JPL
741498	2006 DK_{152}	—	February 25, 2006	Kitt Peak	Spacewatch	EUN	960 m	MPC · JPL
741499	2006 DO_{170}	—	February 27, 2006	Kitt Peak	Spacewatch	·	2.4 km	MPC · JPL
741500	2006 DZ_{200}	—	February 26, 2006	Anderson Mesa	LONEOS	·	1.7 km	MPC · JPL

== 741501–741600 ==
back to top

Designation			Discovery			Properties		Ref
Permanent	Provisional	Named after	Date	Site	Discoverer(s)	Category	Diam.	Ref
741501	2006 DE_{213}	—	February 25, 2006	Mount Lemmon	Mount Lemmon Survey	(5)	1.1 km	MPC · JPL
741502	2006 DC_{220}	—	February 24, 2006	Palomar	NEAT	·	2.2 km	MPC · JPL
741503	2006 DT_{220}	—	February 27, 2006	Kitt Peak	Spacewatch	VER	2.3 km	MPC · JPL
741504	2006 DB_{221}	—	April 20, 2012	Kitt Peak	Spacewatch	·	1.9 km	MPC · JPL
741505	2006 DP_{222}	—	January 28, 2017	Haleakala	Pan-STARRS 1	·	720 m	MPC · JPL
741506	2006 DR_{224}	—	January 31, 2017	Haleakala	Pan-STARRS 1	L5	7.5 km	MPC · JPL
741507	2006 DX_{224}	—	February 21, 2006	Mount Lemmon	Mount Lemmon Survey	·	2.2 km	MPC · JPL
741508	2006 DE_{225}	—	February 25, 2006	Kitt Peak	Spacewatch	·	1.1 km	MPC · JPL
741509	2006 DH_{225}	—	February 28, 2006	Mount Lemmon	Mount Lemmon Survey	·	2.8 km	MPC · JPL
741510	2006 EG	—	February 25, 2006	Kitt Peak	Spacewatch	H	480 m	MPC · JPL
741511	2006 ED_{26}	—	March 3, 2006	Kitt Peak	Spacewatch	·	1.1 km	MPC · JPL
741512	2006 EJ_{44}	—	March 5, 2006	Mount Lemmon	Mount Lemmon Survey	T_{j} (2.99)	2.5 km	MPC · JPL
741513	2006 EO_{52}	—	March 5, 2006	Kitt Peak	Spacewatch	·	810 m	MPC · JPL
741514	2006 EL_{53}	—	January 26, 2006	Mount Lemmon	Mount Lemmon Survey	·	2.2 km	MPC · JPL
741515	2006 EK_{65}	—	March 5, 2006	Kitt Peak	Spacewatch	·	1.1 km	MPC · JPL
741516	2006 EP_{74}	—	March 2, 2006	Kitt Peak	Spacewatch	L5	8.3 km	MPC · JPL
741517	2006 EH_{76}	—	March 3, 2006	Kitt Peak	Spacewatch	·	1.1 km	MPC · JPL
741518	2006 ER_{76}	—	September 4, 2008	Kitt Peak	Spacewatch	·	1.3 km	MPC · JPL
741519	2006 EC_{79}	—	March 14, 2015	Kitt Peak	Spacewatch	·	1.6 km	MPC · JPL
741520	2006 EF_{79}	—	March 2, 2006	Kitt Peak	Wasserman, L. H., Millis, R. L.	·	960 m	MPC · JPL
741521	2006 FP	—	March 22, 2006	Catalina	CSS	T_{j} (2.96)	2.8 km	MPC · JPL
741522	2006 FA_{4}	—	March 23, 2006	Kitt Peak	Spacewatch	NYS	940 m	MPC · JPL
741523	2006 FC_{22}	—	March 24, 2006	Mount Lemmon	Mount Lemmon Survey	THM	1.8 km	MPC · JPL
741524	2006 FN_{35}	—	March 9, 2006	Kitt Peak	Spacewatch	·	1.1 km	MPC · JPL
741525	2006 FL_{56}	—	March 26, 2006	Anderson Mesa	LONEOS	·	3.9 km	MPC · JPL
741526	2006 FZ_{56}	—	March 26, 2006	Mount Lemmon	Mount Lemmon Survey	HNS	1.0 km	MPC · JPL
741527	2006 FL_{57}	—	March 24, 2006	Kitt Peak	Spacewatch	·	510 m	MPC · JPL
741528	2006 FY_{58}	—	April 29, 2014	Haleakala	Pan-STARRS 1	·	1.2 km	MPC · JPL
741529	2006 FS_{59}	—	March 24, 2006	Mount Lemmon	Mount Lemmon Survey	·	1.6 km	MPC · JPL
741530	2006 GH_{13}	—	April 2, 2006	Kitt Peak	Spacewatch	V	600 m	MPC · JPL
741531	2006 GX_{17}	—	April 2, 2006	Kitt Peak	Spacewatch	·	1.3 km	MPC · JPL
741532	2006 GR_{44}	—	April 2, 2006	Kitt Peak	Spacewatch	·	2.0 km	MPC · JPL
741533	2006 GL_{48}	—	April 9, 2006	Kitt Peak	Spacewatch	EUN	940 m	MPC · JPL
741534	2006 GG_{56}	—	April 2, 2006	Kitt Peak	Spacewatch	EUN	860 m	MPC · JPL
741535	2006 GP_{56}	—	January 2, 2014	Kitt Peak	Spacewatch	HNS	920 m	MPC · JPL
741536	2006 GP_{59}	—	April 2, 2006	Catalina	CSS	·	2.1 km	MPC · JPL
741537	2006 HV_{5}	—	April 19, 2006	Socorro	LINEAR	ATE · PHA	310 m	MPC · JPL
741538	2006 HD_{13}	—	April 19, 2006	Kitt Peak	Spacewatch	·	2.4 km	MPC · JPL
741539	2006 HK_{20}	—	April 19, 2006	Mount Lemmon	Mount Lemmon Survey	·	630 m	MPC · JPL
741540	2006 HD_{21}	—	April 20, 2006	Kitt Peak	Spacewatch	ADE	1.3 km	MPC · JPL
741541	2006 HZ_{22}	—	April 20, 2006	Kitt Peak	Spacewatch	·	1.9 km	MPC · JPL
741542	2006 HH_{23}	—	April 2, 2006	Mount Lemmon	Mount Lemmon Survey	TIR	2.3 km	MPC · JPL
741543	2006 HU_{24}	—	April 20, 2006	Kitt Peak	Spacewatch	·	2.1 km	MPC · JPL
741544	2006 HM_{28}	—	April 20, 2006	Kitt Peak	Spacewatch	JUN	680 m	MPC · JPL
741545	2006 HK_{29}	—	April 21, 2006	Mount Lemmon	Mount Lemmon Survey	·	3.1 km	MPC · JPL
741546	2006 HC_{43}	—	March 24, 2006	Mount Lemmon	Mount Lemmon Survey	·	600 m	MPC · JPL
741547	2006 HT_{45}	—	October 31, 2005	Mauna Kea	A. Boattini	·	650 m	MPC · JPL
741548	2006 HA_{48}	—	April 24, 2006	Kitt Peak	Spacewatch	·	1.2 km	MPC · JPL
741549	2006 HY_{48}	—	March 24, 2006	Kitt Peak	Spacewatch	·	1.2 km	MPC · JPL
741550	2006 HH_{50}	—	March 24, 2006	Kitt Peak	Spacewatch	THB	2.3 km	MPC · JPL
741551	2006 HD_{53}	—	April 19, 2006	Anderson Mesa	LONEOS	JUN	880 m	MPC · JPL
741552	2006 HC_{78}	—	March 24, 2006	Kitt Peak	Spacewatch	T_{j} (2.99) · 3:2	4.5 km	MPC · JPL
741553	2006 HS_{87}	—	April 30, 2006	Kitt Peak	Spacewatch	·	1.8 km	MPC · JPL
741554	2006 HN_{100}	—	April 30, 2006	Kitt Peak	Spacewatch	(194)	1.2 km	MPC · JPL
741555	2006 HL_{106}	—	April 30, 2006	Kitt Peak	Spacewatch	·	530 m	MPC · JPL
741556	2006 HC_{107}	—	April 30, 2006	Kitt Peak	Spacewatch	·	1.0 km	MPC · JPL
741557	2006 HX_{110}	—	April 30, 2006	Kitt Peak	Spacewatch	·	1.1 km	MPC · JPL
741558	2006 HE_{117}	—	April 26, 2006	Mount Lemmon	Mount Lemmon Survey	·	770 m	MPC · JPL
741559	2006 HO_{129}	—	April 26, 2006	Cerro Tololo	Deep Ecliptic Survey	L5	7.4 km	MPC · JPL
741560	2006 HT_{155}	—	October 16, 2009	Mount Lemmon	Mount Lemmon Survey	·	2.5 km	MPC · JPL
741561	2006 HT_{156}	—	October 21, 2012	Nogales	M. Schwartz, P. R. Holvorcem	EUN	1.1 km	MPC · JPL
741562	2006 HH_{159}	—	October 25, 2008	Kitt Peak	Spacewatch	·	2.2 km	MPC · JPL
741563	2006 HB_{160}	—	April 19, 2006	Mount Lemmon	Mount Lemmon Survey	·	2.0 km	MPC · JPL
741564	2006 JV_{5}	—	May 3, 2006	Mount Lemmon	Mount Lemmon Survey	LIX	3.0 km	MPC · JPL
741565	2006 JU_{20}	—	May 2, 2006	Kitt Peak	Spacewatch	·	1.6 km	MPC · JPL
741566	2006 JN_{27}	—	April 21, 2006	Kitt Peak	Spacewatch	·	750 m	MPC · JPL
741567	2006 JN_{29}	—	April 18, 2006	Kitt Peak	Spacewatch	·	660 m	MPC · JPL
741568	2006 JS_{51}	—	April 9, 2006	Kitt Peak	Spacewatch	·	1.9 km	MPC · JPL
741569	2006 JF_{59}	—	May 3, 2006	Mount Lemmon	Mount Lemmon Survey	EOS	1.4 km	MPC · JPL
741570	2006 JC_{63}	—	May 1, 2006	Kitt Peak	Deep Ecliptic Survey	·	840 m	MPC · JPL
741571	2006 JL_{67}	—	April 28, 2006	Cerro Tololo	Deep Ecliptic Survey	THM	1.7 km	MPC · JPL
741572	2006 JA_{70}	—	May 1, 2006	Mauna Kea	P. A. Wiegert	·	1.3 km	MPC · JPL
741573	2006 JF_{74}	—	May 1, 2006	Mauna Kea	P. A. Wiegert	(5)	1.1 km	MPC · JPL
741574	2006 JX_{74}	—	May 1, 2006	Mauna Kea	P. A. Wiegert	·	1.4 km	MPC · JPL
741575	2006 JM_{83}	—	May 4, 2006	Kitt Peak	Spacewatch	·	3.0 km	MPC · JPL
741576	2006 JC_{84}	—	May 3, 2006	Kitt Peak	Spacewatch	·	2.5 km	MPC · JPL
741577	2006 JF_{84}	—	September 11, 2010	Mount Lemmon	Mount Lemmon Survey	·	640 m	MPC · JPL
741578	2006 JA_{88}	—	May 9, 2006	Mount Lemmon	Mount Lemmon Survey	·	2.2 km	MPC · JPL
741579	2006 JZ_{88}	—	May 2, 2006	Mount Lemmon	Mount Lemmon Survey	·	2.0 km	MPC · JPL
741580	2006 KO_{15}	—	May 20, 2006	Kitt Peak	Spacewatch	·	2.6 km	MPC · JPL
741581	2006 KM_{21}	—	May 19, 2006	Reedy Creek	J. Broughton	·	2.7 km	MPC · JPL
741582	2006 KU_{24}	—	May 19, 2006	Mount Lemmon	Mount Lemmon Survey	·	1.7 km	MPC · JPL
741583	2006 KG_{25}	—	May 19, 2006	Mount Lemmon	Mount Lemmon Survey	·	1.6 km	MPC · JPL
741584	2006 KQ_{28}	—	May 20, 2006	Kitt Peak	Spacewatch	·	2.1 km	MPC · JPL
741585	2006 KO_{43}	—	May 20, 2006	Kitt Peak	Spacewatch	·	570 m	MPC · JPL
741586	2006 KS_{43}	—	May 20, 2006	Kitt Peak	Spacewatch	·	490 m	MPC · JPL
741587	2006 KL_{45}	—	April 26, 2006	Kitt Peak	Spacewatch	·	2.1 km	MPC · JPL
741588	2006 KN_{57}	—	May 7, 2006	Mount Lemmon	Mount Lemmon Survey	·	2.6 km	MPC · JPL
741589	2006 KV_{57}	—	May 22, 2006	Kitt Peak	Spacewatch	·	2.6 km	MPC · JPL
741590	2006 KS_{73}	—	May 23, 2006	Kitt Peak	Spacewatch	·	2.4 km	MPC · JPL
741591	2006 KX_{76}	—	May 24, 2006	Mount Lemmon	Mount Lemmon Survey	·	2.4 km	MPC · JPL
741592	2006 KZ_{77}	—	May 22, 2006	Kitt Peak	Spacewatch	(5)	920 m	MPC · JPL
741593	2006 KO_{81}	—	May 25, 2006	Mount Lemmon	Mount Lemmon Survey	EOS	1.5 km	MPC · JPL
741594	2006 KW_{93}	—	May 25, 2006	Kitt Peak	Spacewatch	·	570 m	MPC · JPL
741595	2006 KV_{95}	—	May 25, 2006	Kitt Peak	Spacewatch	·	2.6 km	MPC · JPL
741596	2006 KL_{96}	—	May 25, 2006	Kitt Peak	Spacewatch	·	1.3 km	MPC · JPL
741597	2006 KL_{97}	—	May 26, 2006	Kitt Peak	Spacewatch	T_{j} (2.96)	3.2 km	MPC · JPL
741598	2006 KQ_{102}	—	May 27, 2006	Kitt Peak	Spacewatch	·	1.3 km	MPC · JPL
741599	2006 KY_{111}	—	May 31, 2006	Mount Lemmon	Mount Lemmon Survey	EOS	1.7 km	MPC · JPL
741600	2006 KQ_{120}	—	May 31, 2006	Kitt Peak	Spacewatch	(194)	1.1 km	MPC · JPL

== 741601–741700 ==
back to top

Designation			Discovery			Properties		Ref
Permanent	Provisional	Named after	Date	Site	Discoverer(s)	Category	Diam.	Ref
741601	2006 KN_{142}	—	May 25, 2006	Mauna Kea	P. A. Wiegert	·	930 m	MPC · JPL
741602	2006 KY_{144}	—	May 21, 2006	Mount Lemmon	Mount Lemmon Survey	·	2.4 km	MPC · JPL
741603	2006 KT_{145}	—	May 25, 2006	Mount Lemmon	Mount Lemmon Survey	T_{j} (2.99) · EUP	2.3 km	MPC · JPL
741604	2006 KV_{145}	—	May 1, 2006	Kitt Peak	Spacewatch	THM	1.8 km	MPC · JPL
741605	2006 KR_{146}	—	November 13, 2010	Mount Lemmon	Mount Lemmon Survey	EUP	3.1 km	MPC · JPL
741606	2006 KC_{147}	—	May 21, 2006	Kitt Peak	Spacewatch	BRG	1.2 km	MPC · JPL
741607	2006 KP_{147}	—	May 24, 2006	Kitt Peak	Spacewatch	EUN	1.0 km	MPC · JPL
741608	2006 KV_{148}	—	March 3, 2009	Mount Lemmon	Mount Lemmon Survey	·	510 m	MPC · JPL
741609	2006 KW_{148}	—	August 29, 2016	Mount Lemmon	Mount Lemmon Survey	JUN	1.2 km	MPC · JPL
741610	2006 KE_{149}	—	March 19, 2017	Haleakala	Pan-STARRS 1	H	480 m	MPC · JPL
741611	2006 KN_{149}	—	May 30, 2006	Mount Lemmon	Mount Lemmon Survey	·	1.1 km	MPC · JPL
741612	2006 KC_{150}	—	May 23, 2006	Kitt Peak	Spacewatch	·	2.3 km	MPC · JPL
741613	2006 KF_{150}	—	October 12, 2007	Kitt Peak	Spacewatch	·	2.0 km	MPC · JPL
741614	2006 KQ_{150}	—	April 1, 2009	Kitt Peak	Spacewatch	·	520 m	MPC · JPL
741615	2006 KK_{152}	—	July 9, 2010	WISE	WISE	·	1.0 km	MPC · JPL
741616	2006 KC_{154}	—	March 27, 2017	Mount Lemmon	Mount Lemmon Survey	·	2.5 km	MPC · JPL
741617	2006 KS_{155}	—	May 26, 2006	Mount Lemmon	Mount Lemmon Survey	·	690 m	MPC · JPL
741618	2006 KU_{156}	—	May 29, 2006	Kitt Peak	Spacewatch	THB	2.0 km	MPC · JPL
741619	2006 LV_{8}	—	July 12, 2015	Kitt Peak	Spacewatch	·	1.3 km	MPC · JPL
741620	2006 LD_{9}	—	October 12, 2013	Kitt Peak	Spacewatch	·	1.9 km	MPC · JPL
741621	2006 LE_{9}	—	November 7, 2008	Mount Lemmon	Mount Lemmon Survey	·	2.4 km	MPC · JPL
741622	2006 ML_{15}	—	June 19, 2006	Mount Lemmon	Mount Lemmon Survey	PHO	800 m	MPC · JPL
741623	2006 MM_{15}	—	June 21, 2006	Palomar	NEAT	·	4.2 km	MPC · JPL
741624	2006 MF_{16}	—	August 2, 2011	Haleakala	Pan-STARRS 1	·	1.3 km	MPC · JPL
741625	2006 MK_{16}	—	December 5, 2016	Mount Lemmon	Mount Lemmon Survey	EUN	1.0 km	MPC · JPL
741626	2006 OQ_{15}	—	July 26, 2006	Siding Spring	SSS	·	1.6 km	MPC · JPL
741627	2006 OT_{21}	—	July 21, 2006	Mount Lemmon	Mount Lemmon Survey	·	3.4 km	MPC · JPL
741628	2006 OK_{23}	—	July 21, 2006	Mount Lemmon	Mount Lemmon Survey	·	1.3 km	MPC · JPL
741629	2006 OX_{25}	—	July 21, 2006	Mount Lemmon	Mount Lemmon Survey	·	1.0 km	MPC · JPL
741630	2006 OM_{28}	—	July 21, 2006	Mount Lemmon	Mount Lemmon Survey	·	860 m	MPC · JPL
741631	2006 OA_{31}	—	June 4, 2006	Mount Lemmon	Mount Lemmon Survey	·	750 m	MPC · JPL
741632	2006 OO_{32}	—	July 19, 2006	Mauna Kea	P. A. Wiegert, D. Subasinghe	·	1.8 km	MPC · JPL
741633	2006 OM_{38}	—	July 21, 2006	Mount Lemmon	Mount Lemmon Survey	·	1.1 km	MPC · JPL
741634	2006 OL_{39}	—	June 21, 2014	Haleakala	Pan-STARRS 1	·	1.3 km	MPC · JPL
741635	2006 OY_{39}	—	October 10, 2018	Haleakala	Pan-STARRS 2	·	2.6 km	MPC · JPL
741636	2006 OK_{40}	—	July 30, 2006	Lulin	LUSS	·	560 m	MPC · JPL
741637	2006 PQ_{4}	—	May 6, 2006	Mount Lemmon	Mount Lemmon Survey	·	950 m	MPC · JPL
741638	2006 PY_{7}	—	August 12, 2006	Palomar	NEAT	JUN	870 m	MPC · JPL
741639	2006 PL_{25}	—	August 13, 2006	Palomar	NEAT	·	740 m	MPC · JPL
741640	2006 QE	—	August 17, 2006	Palomar	NEAT	APO	420 m	MPC · JPL
741641	2006 QT	—	August 18, 2006	Anderson Mesa	LONEOS	·	520 m	MPC · JPL
741642	2006 QL_{12}	—	August 16, 2006	Siding Spring	SSS	·	1.6 km	MPC · JPL
741643	2006 QA_{15}	—	August 17, 2006	Palomar	NEAT	·	1.2 km	MPC · JPL
741644	2006 QX_{17}	—	August 17, 2006	Palomar	NEAT	·	570 m	MPC · JPL
741645	2006 QF_{19}	—	August 17, 2006	Palomar	NEAT	·	630 m	MPC · JPL
741646	2006 QO_{23}	—	August 21, 2006	Pla D'Arguines	R. Ferrando, Ferrando, M.	ADE	1.3 km	MPC · JPL
741647 Davidge	2006 QP_{34}	Davidge	August 23, 2006	Mauna Kea	D. D. Balam	·	2.5 km	MPC · JPL
741648	2006 QH_{44}	—	October 15, 2002	Palomar	NEAT	·	1.3 km	MPC · JPL
741649	2006 QB_{45}	—	August 19, 2006	Palomar	NEAT	·	710 m	MPC · JPL
741650	2006 QN_{47}	—	August 20, 2006	Palomar	NEAT	·	1.2 km	MPC · JPL
741651	2006 QX_{49}	—	August 22, 2006	Palomar	NEAT	·	1.2 km	MPC · JPL
741652	2006 QY_{55}	—	August 17, 2006	Palomar	NEAT	·	1.6 km	MPC · JPL
741653	2006 QV_{62}	—	August 23, 2006	Palomar	NEAT	NYS	760 m	MPC · JPL
741654	2006 QA_{68}	—	August 21, 2006	Kitt Peak	Spacewatch	·	2.7 km	MPC · JPL
741655	2006 QT_{72}	—	August 21, 2006	Kitt Peak	Spacewatch	THM	1.7 km	MPC · JPL
741656	2006 QQ_{76}	—	August 21, 2006	Kitt Peak	Spacewatch	·	1.1 km	MPC · JPL
741657	2006 QH_{81}	—	August 24, 2006	Palomar	NEAT	JUN	930 m	MPC · JPL
741658	2006 QO_{87}	—	August 31, 2000	Kitt Peak	Spacewatch	T_{j} (2.98) · EUP	3.3 km	MPC · JPL
741659	2006 QW_{92}	—	August 17, 2006	Palomar	NEAT	·	790 m	MPC · JPL
741660	2006 QN_{94}	—	August 19, 2006	Kitt Peak	Spacewatch	·	1.1 km	MPC · JPL
741661	2006 QX_{107}	—	August 28, 2006	Catalina	CSS	·	800 m	MPC · JPL
741662	2006 QA_{108}	—	August 28, 2006	Catalina	CSS	·	550 m	MPC · JPL
741663	2006 QQ_{131}	—	July 18, 2006	Mount Lemmon	Mount Lemmon Survey	EUP	3.0 km	MPC · JPL
741664	2006 QY_{131}	—	August 22, 2006	Palomar	NEAT	·	1.5 km	MPC · JPL
741665	2006 QE_{137}	—	August 29, 2006	Hibiscus	Teamo, N., S. F. Hönig	·	1.5 km	MPC · JPL
741666	2006 QV_{137}	—	August 16, 2006	Palomar	NEAT	ADE	1.8 km	MPC · JPL
741667	2006 QW_{137}	—	August 16, 2006	Palomar	NEAT	·	3.0 km	MPC · JPL
741668	2006 QO_{141}	—	August 24, 2006	Palomar	NEAT	PHO	690 m	MPC · JPL
741669	2006 QX_{141}	—	August 21, 2006	Kitt Peak	Spacewatch	·	1.3 km	MPC · JPL
741670	2006 QD_{146}	—	August 18, 2006	Kitt Peak	Spacewatch	·	2.5 km	MPC · JPL
741671	2006 QP_{146}	—	August 18, 2006	Kitt Peak	Spacewatch	·	2.0 km	MPC · JPL
741672	2006 QK_{155}	—	August 29, 2006	Kitt Peak	Spacewatch	·	850 m	MPC · JPL
741673	2006 QG_{160}	—	February 9, 2005	Mount Lemmon	Mount Lemmon Survey	·	540 m	MPC · JPL
741674	2006 QO_{167}	—	August 30, 2006	Anderson Mesa	LONEOS	EUN	1.1 km	MPC · JPL
741675	2006 QG_{169}	—	August 24, 2006	Palomar	NEAT	·	800 m	MPC · JPL
741676	2006 QV_{178}	—	August 21, 2006	Kitt Peak	Spacewatch	·	1.5 km	MPC · JPL
741677	2006 QG_{188}	—	August 29, 2006	Kitt Peak	Spacewatch	·	2.7 km	MPC · JPL
741678	2006 QS_{188}	—	August 30, 2006	Anderson Mesa	LONEOS	·	1.3 km	MPC · JPL
741679	2006 QM_{189}	—	August 29, 2006	Kitt Peak	Spacewatch	·	840 m	MPC · JPL
741680	2006 QW_{189}	—	August 18, 2006	Kitt Peak	Spacewatch	·	660 m	MPC · JPL
741681	2006 QX_{189}	—	June 7, 2013	Mount Lemmon	Mount Lemmon Survey	·	630 m	MPC · JPL
741682	2006 QF_{190}	—	August 23, 2006	Palomar	NEAT	·	670 m	MPC · JPL
741683	2006 QB_{191}	—	August 28, 2006	Kitt Peak	Spacewatch	·	640 m	MPC · JPL
741684	2006 QN_{192}	—	October 29, 2010	Kitt Peak	Spacewatch	·	830 m	MPC · JPL
741685	2006 QH_{195}	—	August 17, 2006	Palomar	NEAT	ADE	1.3 km	MPC · JPL
741686	2006 QE_{198}	—	February 12, 2008	Kitt Peak	Spacewatch	H	370 m	MPC · JPL
741687	2006 QS_{198}	—	August 19, 2006	Kitt Peak	Spacewatch	·	1.7 km	MPC · JPL
741688	2006 QL_{201}	—	August 29, 2006	Kitt Peak	Spacewatch	·	1.7 km	MPC · JPL
741689	2006 QO_{202}	—	August 29, 2006	Kitt Peak	Spacewatch	·	1.1 km	MPC · JPL
741690	2006 QG_{204}	—	August 22, 2006	Palomar	NEAT	THB	2.7 km	MPC · JPL
741691	2006 QO_{205}	—	August 27, 2006	Kitt Peak	Spacewatch	·	1.3 km	MPC · JPL
741692	2006 RT_{3}	—	August 28, 2006	Catalina	CSS	T_{j} (2.93)	3.8 km	MPC · JPL
741693	2006 RE_{21}	—	September 15, 2006	Kitt Peak	Spacewatch	·	1.1 km	MPC · JPL
741694	2006 RN_{23}	—	September 12, 2006	Catalina	CSS	·	1.4 km	MPC · JPL
741695	2006 RS_{27}	—	September 14, 2006	Palomar	NEAT	·	2.1 km	MPC · JPL
741696	2006 RA_{30}	—	September 15, 2006	Kitt Peak	Spacewatch	·	1.9 km	MPC · JPL
741697	2006 RF_{32}	—	September 15, 2006	Kitt Peak	Spacewatch	·	1.5 km	MPC · JPL
741698	2006 RG_{35}	—	August 29, 2006	Anderson Mesa	LONEOS	·	1.9 km	MPC · JPL
741699	2006 RG_{40}	—	August 28, 2006	Anderson Mesa	LONEOS	·	1.4 km	MPC · JPL
741700	2006 RH_{48}	—	September 14, 2006	Catalina	CSS	·	990 m	MPC · JPL

== 741701–741800 ==
back to top

Designation			Discovery			Properties		Ref
Permanent	Provisional	Named after	Date	Site	Discoverer(s)	Category	Diam.	Ref
741701	2006 RN_{49}	—	September 14, 2006	Kitt Peak	Spacewatch	·	1.4 km	MPC · JPL
741702	2006 RF_{53}	—	September 14, 2006	Kitt Peak	Spacewatch	·	1.3 km	MPC · JPL
741703	2006 RD_{57}	—	September 14, 2006	Catalina	CSS	·	820 m	MPC · JPL
741704	2006 RA_{62}	—	September 12, 2006	Catalina	CSS	·	1.3 km	MPC · JPL
741705	2006 RD_{68}	—	September 15, 2006	Kitt Peak	Spacewatch	·	1.5 km	MPC · JPL
741706	2006 RT_{88}	—	September 15, 2006	Kitt Peak	Spacewatch	·	1.5 km	MPC · JPL
741707	2006 RH_{100}	—	September 14, 2006	Catalina	CSS	·	490 m	MPC · JPL
741708	2006 RC_{106}	—	September 19, 2006	Kitt Peak	Spacewatch	V	440 m	MPC · JPL
741709	2006 RO_{107}	—	September 14, 2006	Mauna Kea	Masiero, J., R. Jedicke	·	1.3 km	MPC · JPL
741710	2006 RA_{113}	—	September 26, 2006	Mount Lemmon	Mount Lemmon Survey	·	1.3 km	MPC · JPL
741711	2006 RL_{116}	—	September 14, 2006	Mauna Kea	Masiero, J., R. Jedicke	·	2.0 km	MPC · JPL
741712	2006 RM_{118}	—	September 30, 2006	Kitt Peak	Spacewatch	·	1.2 km	MPC · JPL
741713	2006 RW_{119}	—	September 25, 2006	Kitt Peak	Spacewatch	·	880 m	MPC · JPL
741714	2006 RW_{123}	—	October 24, 2015	Mount Lemmon	Mount Lemmon Survey	·	1.4 km	MPC · JPL
741715	2006 SC_{10}	—	September 16, 2006	Kitt Peak	Spacewatch	EOS	1.7 km	MPC · JPL
741716	2006 SN_{17}	—	September 17, 2006	Kitt Peak	Spacewatch	·	640 m	MPC · JPL
741717	2006 SK_{20}	—	September 19, 2006	Kitt Peak	Spacewatch	·	730 m	MPC · JPL
741718 Simard	2006 SY_{24}	Simard	September 18, 2006	Mauna Kea	D. D. Balam	·	1.9 km	MPC · JPL
741719	2006 SY_{27}	—	September 17, 2006	Kitt Peak	Spacewatch	·	1.0 km	MPC · JPL
741720	2006 SX_{28}	—	August 29, 2006	Catalina	CSS	·	1.0 km	MPC · JPL
741721	2006 SW_{39}	—	August 29, 2006	Kitt Peak	Spacewatch	·	1.5 km	MPC · JPL
741722	2006 SL_{41}	—	September 18, 2006	Kitt Peak	Spacewatch	·	760 m	MPC · JPL
741723	2006 SY_{41}	—	July 22, 2006	Mount Lemmon	Mount Lemmon Survey	·	1.6 km	MPC · JPL
741724	2006 SF_{43}	—	September 18, 2006	Kitt Peak	Spacewatch	·	1.5 km	MPC · JPL
741725	2006 ST_{49}	—	August 30, 2006	Anderson Mesa	LONEOS	·	880 m	MPC · JPL
741726	2006 SW_{50}	—	August 16, 2006	Palomar	NEAT	·	940 m	MPC · JPL
741727	2006 SA_{51}	—	September 17, 2006	Catalina	CSS	·	1.3 km	MPC · JPL
741728	2006 SH_{52}	—	August 27, 2006	Kitt Peak	Spacewatch	·	1.7 km	MPC · JPL
741729	2006 SH_{55}	—	September 18, 2006	Catalina	CSS	·	2.0 km	MPC · JPL
741730	2006 SF_{63}	—	August 18, 2006	Anderson Mesa	LONEOS	·	3.3 km	MPC · JPL
741731	2006 SM_{74}	—	September 19, 2006	Kitt Peak	Spacewatch	EUN	1 km	MPC · JPL
741732	2006 SE_{81}	—	September 18, 2006	Kitt Peak	Spacewatch	·	1.4 km	MPC · JPL
741733	2006 SP_{81}	—	September 18, 2006	Kitt Peak	Spacewatch	·	710 m	MPC · JPL
741734	2006 SD_{82}	—	September 18, 2006	Kitt Peak	Spacewatch	·	1.4 km	MPC · JPL
741735	2006 SH_{82}	—	September 18, 2006	Kitt Peak	Spacewatch	·	610 m	MPC · JPL
741736	2006 SR_{82}	—	September 18, 2006	Kitt Peak	Spacewatch	AGN	820 m	MPC · JPL
741737	2006 SZ_{91}	—	September 18, 2006	Kitt Peak	Spacewatch	AEO	810 m	MPC · JPL
741738	2006 SX_{95}	—	September 18, 2006	Kitt Peak	Spacewatch	·	1.7 km	MPC · JPL
741739	2006 SO_{105}	—	September 19, 2006	Kitt Peak	Spacewatch	·	2.3 km	MPC · JPL
741740	2006 SC_{114}	—	September 15, 2006	Kitt Peak	Spacewatch	AGN	790 m	MPC · JPL
741741	2006 SL_{120}	—	September 18, 2006	Catalina	CSS	·	650 m	MPC · JPL
741742	2006 SW_{120}	—	September 18, 2006	Catalina	CSS	·	2.1 km	MPC · JPL
741743	2006 SG_{138}	—	September 20, 2006	Catalina	CSS	·	850 m	MPC · JPL
741744	2006 SQ_{143}	—	September 19, 2006	Kitt Peak	Spacewatch	·	1.6 km	MPC · JPL
741745	2006 SV_{152}	—	August 22, 2006	Palomar	NEAT	PHO	840 m	MPC · JPL
741746	2006 SZ_{158}	—	September 15, 2006	Kitt Peak	Spacewatch	·	2.1 km	MPC · JPL
741747	2006 SC_{179}	—	September 25, 2006	Kitt Peak	Spacewatch	V	440 m	MPC · JPL
741748	2006 SL_{180}	—	September 25, 2006	Mount Lemmon	Mount Lemmon Survey	·	1.6 km	MPC · JPL
741749	2006 SM_{196}	—	September 17, 2006	Kitt Peak	Spacewatch	·	1.1 km	MPC · JPL
741750	2006 SZ_{198}	—	September 15, 2006	Kitt Peak	Spacewatch	NYS	910 m	MPC · JPL
741751	2006 SJ_{205}	—	September 25, 2006	Mount Lemmon	Mount Lemmon Survey	·	1.9 km	MPC · JPL
741752	2006 SY_{205}	—	September 25, 2006	Anderson Mesa	LONEOS	·	1.6 km	MPC · JPL
741753	2006 SB_{206}	—	September 25, 2006	Anderson Mesa	LONEOS	·	2.2 km	MPC · JPL
741754	2006 SJ_{209}	—	September 16, 2006	Kitt Peak	Spacewatch	NYS	720 m	MPC · JPL
741755	2006 SP_{241}	—	January 9, 1997	Kitt Peak	Spacewatch	·	520 m	MPC · JPL
741756	2006 SO_{247}	—	September 15, 2006	Kitt Peak	Spacewatch	·	1.9 km	MPC · JPL
741757	2006 SR_{249}	—	September 26, 2006	Kitt Peak	Spacewatch	·	3.1 km	MPC · JPL
741758	2006 SE_{250}	—	July 21, 2006	Mount Lemmon	Mount Lemmon Survey	NYS	780 m	MPC · JPL
741759	2006 SG_{251}	—	September 19, 2006	Kitt Peak	Spacewatch	·	670 m	MPC · JPL
741760	2006 SM_{263}	—	September 26, 2006	Kitt Peak	Spacewatch	V	450 m	MPC · JPL
741761	2006 SY_{276}	—	September 28, 2006	Kitt Peak	Spacewatch	·	1.5 km	MPC · JPL
741762	2006 SR_{283}	—	September 26, 2006	Catalina	CSS	·	1.8 km	MPC · JPL
741763	2006 SW_{283}	—	September 26, 2006	Catalina	CSS	·	1.8 km	MPC · JPL
741764	2006 SS_{294}	—	September 17, 2006	Kitt Peak	Spacewatch	·	1.2 km	MPC · JPL
741765	2006 SW_{294}	—	September 17, 2006	Kitt Peak	Spacewatch	V	460 m	MPC · JPL
741766	2006 SR_{304}	—	September 27, 2006	Kitt Peak	Spacewatch	NYS	940 m	MPC · JPL
741767	2006 SB_{307}	—	September 16, 2006	Catalina	CSS	EUN	1.1 km	MPC · JPL
741768	2006 SZ_{312}	—	September 18, 2006	Kitt Peak	Spacewatch	·	670 m	MPC · JPL
741769	2006 SM_{314}	—	September 27, 2006	Kitt Peak	Spacewatch	·	620 m	MPC · JPL
741770	2006 SJ_{327}	—	April 9, 2002	Palomar	NEAT	·	570 m	MPC · JPL
741771	2006 SA_{359}	—	September 30, 2006	Catalina	CSS	·	1.3 km	MPC · JPL
741772	2006 SM_{364}	—	September 28, 2006	Mount Lemmon	Mount Lemmon Survey	EUN	1.2 km	MPC · JPL
741773	2006 SQ_{380}	—	October 28, 2006	Catalina	CSS	·	1.5 km	MPC · JPL
741774	2006 SN_{387}	—	September 30, 2006	Apache Point	SDSS Collaboration	EUN	650 m	MPC · JPL
741775	2006 SP_{397}	—	September 25, 2006	Mount Lemmon	Mount Lemmon Survey	·	800 m	MPC · JPL
741776	2006 ST_{397}	—	September 25, 2006	Kitt Peak	Spacewatch	HNS	760 m	MPC · JPL
741777	2006 SB_{399}	—	September 17, 2006	Kitt Peak	Spacewatch	HNS	910 m	MPC · JPL
741778	2006 SL_{401}	—	September 28, 2006	Catalina	CSS	·	1.5 km	MPC · JPL
741779	2006 SJ_{404}	—	September 30, 2006	Mount Lemmon	Mount Lemmon Survey	·	3.3 km	MPC · JPL
741780	2006 SL_{410}	—	September 17, 2006	Kitt Peak	Spacewatch	·	2.1 km	MPC · JPL
741781	2006 SJ_{423}	—	September 26, 2006	Catalina	CSS	·	820 m	MPC · JPL
741782	2006 SA_{426}	—	September 16, 2006	Kitt Peak	Spacewatch	·	2.9 km	MPC · JPL
741783	2006 SN_{426}	—	November 12, 2012	Mount Lemmon	Mount Lemmon Survey	·	2.5 km	MPC · JPL
741784	2006 SU_{426}	—	March 21, 2015	Haleakala	Pan-STARRS 1	EOS	1.4 km	MPC · JPL
741785	2006 SB_{427}	—	August 9, 2013	Kitt Peak	Spacewatch	V	420 m	MPC · JPL
741786	2006 SQ_{427}	—	September 18, 2006	Kitt Peak	Spacewatch	·	700 m	MPC · JPL
741787	2006 SD_{428}	—	August 27, 2006	Kitt Peak	Spacewatch	·	2.5 km	MPC · JPL
741788	2006 SH_{428}	—	September 18, 2006	Kitt Peak	Spacewatch	·	690 m	MPC · JPL
741789	2006 SN_{428}	—	September 28, 2006	Mount Lemmon	Mount Lemmon Survey	MAS	570 m	MPC · JPL
741790	2006 SO_{428}	—	September 19, 2006	Kitt Peak	Spacewatch	·	1.3 km	MPC · JPL
741791	2006 SD_{429}	—	September 20, 2011	Mount Lemmon	Mount Lemmon Survey	·	1.4 km	MPC · JPL
741792	2006 SV_{429}	—	August 9, 2013	Kitt Peak	Spacewatch	·	760 m	MPC · JPL
741793	2006 SX_{429}	—	September 17, 2006	Kitt Peak	Spacewatch	(895)	2.6 km	MPC · JPL
741794	2006 SA_{433}	—	September 17, 2006	Catalina	CSS	·	1.6 km	MPC · JPL
741795	2006 SO_{433}	—	September 16, 2006	Kitt Peak	Spacewatch	·	1.1 km	MPC · JPL
741796	2006 ST_{433}	—	September 28, 2006	Mount Lemmon	Mount Lemmon Survey	·	1.2 km	MPC · JPL
741797	2006 SF_{436}	—	March 18, 2009	Mount Lemmon	Mount Lemmon Survey	·	1.4 km	MPC · JPL
741798	2006 SY_{436}	—	August 19, 2006	Kitt Peak	Spacewatch	·	1.3 km	MPC · JPL
741799	2006 SR_{437}	—	September 17, 2017	Haleakala	Pan-STARRS 1	·	1.0 km	MPC · JPL
741800	2006 SA_{438}	—	July 25, 2017	Haleakala	Pan-STARRS 1	·	2.3 km	MPC · JPL

== 741801–741900 ==
back to top

Designation			Discovery			Properties		Ref
Permanent	Provisional	Named after	Date	Site	Discoverer(s)	Category	Diam.	Ref
741801	2006 SS_{438}	—	August 11, 2018	Haleakala	Pan-STARRS 1	·	2.6 km	MPC · JPL
741802	2006 SQ_{439}	—	October 11, 2015	Mount Lemmon	Mount Lemmon Survey	·	1.7 km	MPC · JPL
741803	2006 SE_{440}	—	September 17, 2006	Kitt Peak	Spacewatch	V	470 m	MPC · JPL
741804	2006 SB_{441}	—	March 7, 2013	Mount Lemmon	Mount Lemmon Survey	·	1.5 km	MPC · JPL
741805	2006 SX_{441}	—	October 3, 2013	Haleakala	Pan-STARRS 1	·	670 m	MPC · JPL
741806	2006 SV_{444}	—	August 29, 2006	Catalina	CSS	PHO	750 m	MPC · JPL
741807	2006 SA_{445}	—	March 22, 2009	Mount Lemmon	Mount Lemmon Survey	GAL	1.2 km	MPC · JPL
741808	2006 SA_{446}	—	September 18, 2006	Kitt Peak	Spacewatch	·	580 m	MPC · JPL
741809	2006 SX_{446}	—	September 28, 2006	Kitt Peak	Spacewatch	·	550 m	MPC · JPL
741810	2006 SU_{447}	—	September 27, 2006	Kitt Peak	Spacewatch	·	730 m	MPC · JPL
741811	2006 SC_{455}	—	September 17, 2006	Kitt Peak	Spacewatch	·	2.8 km	MPC · JPL
741812	2006 TL_{7}	—	October 12, 2006	Rehoboth	L. A. Molnar	·	2.0 km	MPC · JPL
741813	2006 TK_{11}	—	October 15, 2006	Piszkéstető	K. Sárneczky, Kuli, Z.	·	1.2 km	MPC · JPL
741814	2006 TH_{16}	—	September 24, 2006	Kitt Peak	Spacewatch	·	1.3 km	MPC · JPL
741815	2006 TZ_{18}	—	October 2, 2006	Mount Lemmon	Mount Lemmon Survey	·	1.4 km	MPC · JPL
741816	2006 TX_{32}	—	September 26, 2006	Mount Lemmon	Mount Lemmon Survey	·	1.3 km	MPC · JPL
741817	2006 TN_{36}	—	September 27, 2006	Mount Lemmon	Mount Lemmon Survey	·	1.3 km	MPC · JPL
741818	2006 TV_{43}	—	September 25, 2006	Mount Lemmon	Mount Lemmon Survey	·	830 m	MPC · JPL
741819	2006 TH_{52}	—	October 12, 2006	Kitt Peak	Spacewatch	·	1.5 km	MPC · JPL
741820	2006 TL_{52}	—	September 25, 2006	Mount Lemmon	Mount Lemmon Survey	·	1.7 km	MPC · JPL
741821 Lewisknee	2006 TO_{58}	Lewisknee	October 11, 2006	Mauna Kea	D. D. Balam	·	600 m	MPC · JPL
741822	2006 TF_{61}	—	September 19, 2006	Kitt Peak	Spacewatch	·	2.3 km	MPC · JPL
741823	2006 TV_{62}	—	September 16, 2006	Vail	Observatory, Jarnac	·	1.9 km	MPC · JPL
741824	2006 TA_{72}	—	October 3, 2006	Mount Lemmon	Mount Lemmon Survey	·	810 m	MPC · JPL
741825	2006 TO_{76}	—	September 28, 2006	Catalina	CSS	·	1.6 km	MPC · JPL
741826	2006 TP_{82}	—	October 4, 2006	Mount Lemmon	Mount Lemmon Survey	(5)	1.0 km	MPC · JPL
741827	2006 TQ_{82}	—	October 4, 2006	Mount Lemmon	Mount Lemmon Survey	·	1.7 km	MPC · JPL
741828	2006 TG_{85}	—	October 13, 2006	Kitt Peak	Spacewatch	PHO	780 m	MPC · JPL
741829	2006 TS_{85}	—	October 2, 2006	Mount Lemmon	Mount Lemmon Survey	(13314)	1.4 km	MPC · JPL
741830	2006 TX_{88}	—	October 13, 2006	Kitt Peak	Spacewatch	(13314)	1.4 km	MPC · JPL
741831	2006 TY_{89}	—	October 13, 2006	Kitt Peak	Spacewatch	·	600 m	MPC · JPL
741832	2006 TD_{95}	—	September 23, 2006	Kitt Peak	Spacewatch	·	1.4 km	MPC · JPL
741833	2006 TL_{96}	—	October 12, 2006	Palomar	NEAT	ERI	1.3 km	MPC · JPL
741834	2006 TX_{113}	—	October 1, 2006	Apache Point	SDSS Collaboration	·	870 m	MPC · JPL
741835	2006 TS_{118}	—	October 22, 2006	Catalina	CSS	·	850 m	MPC · JPL
741836	2006 TR_{131}	—	October 2, 2006	Mount Lemmon	Mount Lemmon Survey	·	720 m	MPC · JPL
741837	2006 TS_{131}	—	October 2, 2006	Mount Lemmon	Mount Lemmon Survey	·	790 m	MPC · JPL
741838	2006 TU_{131}	—	October 2, 2006	Mount Lemmon	Mount Lemmon Survey	·	710 m	MPC · JPL
741839	2006 TW_{131}	—	October 2, 2006	Mount Lemmon	Mount Lemmon Survey	·	860 m	MPC · JPL
741840	2006 TN_{132}	—	October 2, 2006	Mount Lemmon	Mount Lemmon Survey	·	540 m	MPC · JPL
741841	2006 TU_{132}	—	October 3, 2006	Mount Lemmon	Mount Lemmon Survey	·	550 m	MPC · JPL
741842	2006 TV_{132}	—	October 3, 2006	Mount Lemmon	Mount Lemmon Survey	MRX	830 m	MPC · JPL
741843	2006 TA_{133}	—	October 3, 2006	Mount Lemmon	Mount Lemmon Survey	LIX	2.5 km	MPC · JPL
741844	2006 TU_{133}	—	October 11, 2006	Palomar	NEAT	·	3.1 km	MPC · JPL
741845	2006 TB_{140}	—	October 2, 2006	Mount Lemmon	Mount Lemmon Survey	·	890 m	MPC · JPL
741846	2006 TB_{141}	—	October 13, 2006	Kitt Peak	Spacewatch	·	2.8 km	MPC · JPL
741847	2006 TY_{142}	—	October 2, 2006	Mount Lemmon	Mount Lemmon Survey	·	1.9 km	MPC · JPL
741848	2006 UR_{4}	—	October 2, 2006	Mount Lemmon	Mount Lemmon Survey	·	670 m	MPC · JPL
741849	2006 UA_{6}	—	September 26, 2006	Mount Lemmon	Mount Lemmon Survey	·	890 m	MPC · JPL
741850	2006 UD_{22}	—	August 29, 2006	Kitt Peak	Spacewatch	EUN	930 m	MPC · JPL
741851	2006 UX_{29}	—	October 16, 2006	Kitt Peak	Spacewatch	·	760 m	MPC · JPL
741852	2006 UR_{30}	—	October 4, 2006	Mount Lemmon	Mount Lemmon Survey	NEM	1.5 km	MPC · JPL
741853	2006 UA_{31}	—	September 27, 2006	Mount Lemmon	Mount Lemmon Survey	·	2.6 km	MPC · JPL
741854	2006 UZ_{31}	—	September 25, 2006	Mount Lemmon	Mount Lemmon Survey	·	770 m	MPC · JPL
741855	2006 UH_{41}	—	October 16, 2006	Kitt Peak	Spacewatch	·	810 m	MPC · JPL
741856	2006 UJ_{46}	—	September 30, 2006	Mount Lemmon	Mount Lemmon Survey	·	490 m	MPC · JPL
741857	2006 UP_{49}	—	September 30, 2006	Kitt Peak	Spacewatch	·	700 m	MPC · JPL
741858	2006 UQ_{58}	—	October 19, 2006	Mount Lemmon	Mount Lemmon Survey	·	630 m	MPC · JPL
741859	2006 UJ_{63}	—	October 13, 2006	Kitt Peak	Spacewatch	·	750 m	MPC · JPL
741860	2006 UG_{67}	—	October 16, 2006	Kitt Peak	Spacewatch	·	750 m	MPC · JPL
741861	2006 UE_{70}	—	September 27, 2006	Mount Lemmon	Mount Lemmon Survey	·	570 m	MPC · JPL
741862	2006 UR_{75}	—	September 23, 2006	Kitt Peak	Spacewatch	·	2.4 km	MPC · JPL
741863	2006 UJ_{80}	—	October 17, 2006	Mount Lemmon	Mount Lemmon Survey	·	1.2 km	MPC · JPL
741864	2006 UL_{82}	—	October 17, 2006	Kitt Peak	Spacewatch	·	2.6 km	MPC · JPL
741865	2006 UX_{84}	—	September 28, 2006	Mount Lemmon	Mount Lemmon Survey	·	1.5 km	MPC · JPL
741866	2006 UX_{86}	—	September 30, 2006	Mount Lemmon	Mount Lemmon Survey	·	1.6 km	MPC · JPL
741867	2006 UC_{94}	—	September 30, 2006	Mount Lemmon	Mount Lemmon Survey	V	480 m	MPC · JPL
741868	2006 UZ_{94}	—	October 3, 2006	Mount Lemmon	Mount Lemmon Survey	·	630 m	MPC · JPL
741869	2006 UP_{95}	—	September 30, 2006	Catalina	CSS	·	650 m	MPC · JPL
741870	2006 UF_{99}	—	October 2, 2006	Mount Lemmon	Mount Lemmon Survey	·	1.1 km	MPC · JPL
741871	2006 UJ_{110}	—	September 21, 2006	Anderson Mesa	LONEOS	·	1.5 km	MPC · JPL
741872	2006 UR_{122}	—	October 11, 2006	Kitt Peak	Spacewatch	·	1.7 km	MPC · JPL
741873	2006 UB_{127}	—	October 2, 2006	Mount Lemmon	Mount Lemmon Survey	·	1.7 km	MPC · JPL
741874	2006 UT_{127}	—	October 2, 2006	Mount Lemmon	Mount Lemmon Survey	MRX	760 m	MPC · JPL
741875	2006 UZ_{133}	—	September 26, 2006	Mount Lemmon	Mount Lemmon Survey	NYS	760 m	MPC · JPL
741876	2006 UM_{135}	—	September 30, 2006	Mount Lemmon	Mount Lemmon Survey	·	900 m	MPC · JPL
741877	2006 UN_{138}	—	October 19, 2006	Kitt Peak	Spacewatch	V	540 m	MPC · JPL
741878	2006 UF_{140}	—	October 19, 2006	Kitt Peak	Spacewatch	·	1.4 km	MPC · JPL
741879	2006 UO_{146}	—	September 13, 2006	Palomar	NEAT	·	1.7 km	MPC · JPL
741880	2006 US_{146}	—	October 20, 2006	Kitt Peak	Spacewatch	·	2.2 km	MPC · JPL
741881	2006 UD_{152}	—	September 27, 2006	Mount Lemmon	Mount Lemmon Survey	·	900 m	MPC · JPL
741882	2006 UL_{154}	—	October 2, 2006	Mount Lemmon	Mount Lemmon Survey	·	630 m	MPC · JPL
741883	2006 UY_{163}	—	October 2, 2006	Mount Lemmon	Mount Lemmon Survey	·	1.4 km	MPC · JPL
741884	2006 UM_{165}	—	October 2, 2006	Mount Lemmon	Mount Lemmon Survey	·	1.5 km	MPC · JPL
741885	2006 UC_{166}	—	October 21, 2006	Mount Lemmon	Mount Lemmon Survey	·	700 m	MPC · JPL
741886	2006 US_{166}	—	October 2, 2006	Mount Lemmon	Mount Lemmon Survey	·	1.4 km	MPC · JPL
741887	2006 UJ_{167}	—	October 3, 2006	Mount Lemmon	Mount Lemmon Survey	V	450 m	MPC · JPL
741888	2006 US_{167}	—	October 2, 2006	Mount Lemmon	Mount Lemmon Survey	·	1.1 km	MPC · JPL
741889	2006 UR_{186}	—	September 18, 2006	Catalina	CSS	·	1.5 km	MPC · JPL
741890	2006 UE_{193}	—	August 30, 2006	Anderson Mesa	LONEOS	T_{j} (2.93) · 3:2	4.9 km	MPC · JPL
741891	2006 UC_{198}	—	October 12, 2006	Kitt Peak	Spacewatch	·	2.0 km	MPC · JPL
741892	2006 UX_{199}	—	September 14, 2006	Kitt Peak	Spacewatch	·	950 m	MPC · JPL
741893	2006 UY_{205}	—	October 23, 2006	Kitt Peak	Spacewatch	·	1.2 km	MPC · JPL
741894	2006 UX_{219}	—	October 16, 2006	Catalina	CSS	·	740 m	MPC · JPL
741895	2006 UD_{221}	—	October 17, 2006	Catalina	CSS	·	1.6 km	MPC · JPL
741896	2006 UM_{221}	—	September 18, 2006	Catalina	CSS	·	740 m	MPC · JPL
741897	2006 UW_{224}	—	September 28, 2006	Kitt Peak	Spacewatch	·	660 m	MPC · JPL
741898	2006 UQ_{227}	—	October 22, 2006	Catalina	CSS	·	590 m	MPC · JPL
741899	2006 UG_{228}	—	October 19, 2006	Catalina	CSS	·	660 m	MPC · JPL
741900	2006 UE_{236}	—	October 23, 2006	Kitt Peak	Spacewatch	HNS	770 m	MPC · JPL

== 741901–742000 ==
back to top

Designation			Discovery			Properties		Ref
Permanent	Provisional	Named after	Date	Site	Discoverer(s)	Category	Diam.	Ref
741901	2006 UR_{242}	—	September 25, 2006	Mount Lemmon	Mount Lemmon Survey	AGN	810 m	MPC · JPL
741902	2006 UZ_{243}	—	October 27, 2006	Mount Lemmon	Mount Lemmon Survey	·	1.3 km	MPC · JPL
741903	2006 UE_{246}	—	October 27, 2006	Mount Lemmon	Mount Lemmon Survey	·	1.5 km	MPC · JPL
741904	2006 UP_{249}	—	October 4, 2006	Mount Lemmon	Mount Lemmon Survey	H	380 m	MPC · JPL
741905	2006 UP_{253}	—	October 27, 2006	Mount Lemmon	Mount Lemmon Survey	AST	1.3 km	MPC · JPL
741906	2006 UL_{257}	—	October 16, 2006	Kitt Peak	Spacewatch	·	1.2 km	MPC · JPL
741907	2006 UO_{258}	—	October 28, 2006	Mount Lemmon	Mount Lemmon Survey	·	780 m	MPC · JPL
741908	2006 UY_{258}	—	October 16, 2006	Kitt Peak	Spacewatch	·	1.5 km	MPC · JPL
741909	2006 UH_{278}	—	September 27, 2006	Mount Lemmon	Mount Lemmon Survey	·	770 m	MPC · JPL
741910	2006 UK_{282}	—	October 16, 2006	Kitt Peak	Spacewatch	DOR	1.3 km	MPC · JPL
741911	2006 UL_{286}	—	September 26, 2006	Mount Lemmon	Mount Lemmon Survey	·	850 m	MPC · JPL
741912	2006 UX_{287}	—	October 29, 2006	Kitt Peak	Spacewatch	·	1.3 km	MPC · JPL
741913	2006 UB_{294}	—	October 19, 2006	Kitt Peak	Deep Ecliptic Survey	·	2.7 km	MPC · JPL
741914	2006 UO_{298}	—	August 29, 2006	Kitt Peak	Spacewatch	·	1.5 km	MPC · JPL
741915	2006 UL_{319}	—	October 19, 2006	Kitt Peak	Deep Ecliptic Survey	·	1.5 km	MPC · JPL
741916	2006 UO_{336}	—	October 21, 2006	Mount Lemmon	Mount Lemmon Survey	VER	2.1 km	MPC · JPL
741917	2006 UQ_{356}	—	October 13, 2006	Kitt Peak	Spacewatch	·	980 m	MPC · JPL
741918	2006 UN_{358}	—	October 16, 2006	Kitt Peak	Spacewatch	·	1.3 km	MPC · JPL
741919	2006 UP_{358}	—	October 16, 2006	Kitt Peak	Spacewatch	·	1.3 km	MPC · JPL
741920	2006 UC_{359}	—	October 20, 2006	Kitt Peak	Spacewatch	·	1.5 km	MPC · JPL
741921	2006 UD_{362}	—	October 17, 2006	Mount Lemmon	Mount Lemmon Survey	EUN	1.0 km	MPC · JPL
741922	2006 UN_{366}	—	August 31, 2011	Haleakala	Pan-STARRS 1	·	2.6 km	MPC · JPL
741923	2006 UL_{367}	—	October 21, 2006	Lulin	LUSS	·	770 m	MPC · JPL
741924	2006 UR_{368}	—	October 20, 2006	Mount Lemmon	Mount Lemmon Survey	·	870 m	MPC · JPL
741925	2006 UP_{369}	—	November 21, 1997	Kitt Peak	Spacewatch	·	1.1 km	MPC · JPL
741926	2006 UE_{370}	—	October 23, 2006	Mount Lemmon	Mount Lemmon Survey	·	560 m	MPC · JPL
741927	2006 UE_{371}	—	October 18, 2006	Kitt Peak	Spacewatch	·	760 m	MPC · JPL
741928	2006 UQ_{372}	—	October 23, 2016	Mount Lemmon	Mount Lemmon Survey	·	550 m	MPC · JPL
741929	2006 UF_{377}	—	October 10, 2015	Haleakala	Pan-STARRS 1	·	1.1 km	MPC · JPL
741930	2006 UN_{378}	—	January 24, 2011	Mount Lemmon	Mount Lemmon Survey	·	540 m	MPC · JPL
741931	2006 UA_{379}	—	October 20, 2006	Kitt Peak	Spacewatch	·	1.2 km	MPC · JPL
741932	2006 UG_{385}	—	October 28, 2006	Kitt Peak	Spacewatch	·	1.8 km	MPC · JPL
741933	2006 UC_{387}	—	October 19, 2006	Kitt Peak	Spacewatch	·	1.3 km	MPC · JPL
741934	2006 UN_{387}	—	October 21, 2006	Kitt Peak	Spacewatch	HOF	1.9 km	MPC · JPL
741935	2006 UR_{387}	—	October 21, 2006	Kitt Peak	Spacewatch	·	1.9 km	MPC · JPL
741936	2006 UC_{392}	—	October 21, 2006	Kitt Peak	Spacewatch	VER	2.3 km	MPC · JPL
741937	2006 VW_{1}	—	September 26, 2006	Mount Lemmon	Mount Lemmon Survey	H	490 m	MPC · JPL
741938	2006 VG_{8}	—	November 11, 2006	Kitt Peak	Spacewatch	·	1.5 km	MPC · JPL
741939	2006 VL_{8}	—	November 11, 2006	Kitt Peak	Spacewatch	·	1.6 km	MPC · JPL
741940	2006 VN_{13}	—	November 13, 2006	Palomar	NEAT	·	1.6 km	MPC · JPL
741941	2006 VV_{18}	—	October 21, 2006	Kitt Peak	Spacewatch	·	1.8 km	MPC · JPL
741942	2006 VS_{21}	—	October 3, 2006	Mount Lemmon	Mount Lemmon Survey	·	640 m	MPC · JPL
741943	2006 VC_{40}	—	November 12, 2006	Mount Lemmon	Mount Lemmon Survey	·	820 m	MPC · JPL
741944	2006 VD_{40}	—	October 30, 2006	Mount Lemmon	Mount Lemmon Survey	·	2.0 km	MPC · JPL
741945	2006 VY_{41}	—	October 21, 2006	Kitt Peak	Spacewatch	·	1.2 km	MPC · JPL
741946	2006 VO_{55}	—	October 19, 2006	Mount Lemmon	Mount Lemmon Survey	NYS	740 m	MPC · JPL
741947	2006 VU_{63}	—	September 28, 2006	Mount Lemmon	Mount Lemmon Survey	·	740 m	MPC · JPL
741948	2006 VD_{65}	—	October 16, 2006	Catalina	CSS	·	1.7 km	MPC · JPL
741949	2006 VS_{69}	—	November 11, 2006	Kitt Peak	Spacewatch	·	820 m	MPC · JPL
741950	2006 VU_{74}	—	October 23, 2006	Mount Lemmon	Mount Lemmon Survey	·	1.6 km	MPC · JPL
741951	2006 VO_{86}	—	September 28, 2006	Mount Lemmon	Mount Lemmon Survey	·	1.2 km	MPC · JPL
741952	2006 VJ_{88}	—	November 14, 2006	Mount Lemmon	Mount Lemmon Survey	·	1.7 km	MPC · JPL
741953	2006 VA_{89}	—	September 28, 2006	Mount Lemmon	Mount Lemmon Survey	·	1.1 km	MPC · JPL
741954	2006 VJ_{92}	—	November 15, 2006	Catalina	CSS	·	1.8 km	MPC · JPL
741955	2006 VR_{95}	—	November 15, 2006	Kitt Peak	Spacewatch	·	2.8 km	MPC · JPL
741956	2006 VD_{107}	—	November 13, 2006	Kitt Peak	Spacewatch	·	2.6 km	MPC · JPL
741957	2006 VU_{110}	—	November 13, 2006	Kitt Peak	Spacewatch	·	1.7 km	MPC · JPL
741958	2006 VC_{119}	—	April 12, 2005	Kitt Peak	Spacewatch	·	670 m	MPC · JPL
741959	2006 VO_{122}	—	February 27, 2004	Kitt Peak	Deep Ecliptic Survey	·	660 m	MPC · JPL
741960	2006 VV_{124}	—	October 20, 2006	Mount Lemmon	Mount Lemmon Survey	·	1.6 km	MPC · JPL
741961	2006 VF_{126}	—	October 21, 2006	Mount Lemmon	Mount Lemmon Survey	·	2.2 km	MPC · JPL
741962	2006 VH_{126}	—	October 17, 2006	Kitt Peak	Spacewatch	·	1.4 km	MPC · JPL
741963	2006 VO_{127}	—	October 21, 1995	Kitt Peak	Spacewatch	·	650 m	MPC · JPL
741964	2006 VM_{135}	—	October 28, 2006	Mount Lemmon	Mount Lemmon Survey	·	1.6 km	MPC · JPL
741965	2006 VX_{155}	—	October 29, 2006	Catalina	CSS	·	1.7 km	MPC · JPL
741966	2006 VJ_{161}	—	March 28, 2015	Kitt Peak	Spacewatch	·	1.8 km	MPC · JPL
741967	2006 VP_{171}	—	November 1, 2006	Kitt Peak	Spacewatch	NYS	680 m	MPC · JPL
741968	2006 VX_{171}	—	November 11, 2006	Kitt Peak	Spacewatch	·	850 m	MPC · JPL
741969	2006 VT_{174}	—	October 22, 2006	Kitt Peak	Spacewatch	NYS	700 m	MPC · JPL
741970	2006 VD_{176}	—	October 3, 2006	Mount Lemmon	Mount Lemmon Survey	·	1.5 km	MPC · JPL
741971	2006 VG_{177}	—	September 30, 2006	Mount Lemmon	Mount Lemmon Survey	NYS	880 m	MPC · JPL
741972	2006 VS_{177}	—	November 1, 2006	Kitt Peak	Spacewatch	·	1.6 km	MPC · JPL
741973	2006 VS_{178}	—	June 27, 2014	Haleakala	Pan-STARRS 1	·	1.3 km	MPC · JPL
741974	2006 VG_{179}	—	January 29, 2017	Haleakala	Pan-STARRS 1	·	1.7 km	MPC · JPL
741975	2006 VE_{180}	—	January 26, 2017	Haleakala	Pan-STARRS 1	PAD	1.3 km	MPC · JPL
741976	2006 VN_{180}	—	November 11, 2006	Mount Lemmon	Mount Lemmon Survey	·	1.1 km	MPC · JPL
741977	2006 VP_{180}	—	January 27, 2017	Mount Lemmon	Mount Lemmon Survey	HOF	1.7 km	MPC · JPL
741978	2006 WF_{7}	—	November 16, 2006	Kitt Peak	Spacewatch	·	1.4 km	MPC · JPL
741979	2006 WT_{7}	—	October 22, 2006	Mount Lemmon	Mount Lemmon Survey	·	590 m	MPC · JPL
741980	2006 WT_{20}	—	November 17, 2006	Mount Lemmon	Mount Lemmon Survey	HOF	2.1 km	MPC · JPL
741981	2006 WN_{27}	—	November 19, 2006	Vallemare Borbona	V. S. Casulli	·	1.6 km	MPC · JPL
741982	2006 WE_{30}	—	November 19, 2006	Lulin	LUSS	·	2.1 km	MPC · JPL
741983	2006 WB_{37}	—	November 16, 2006	Kitt Peak	Spacewatch	·	1.7 km	MPC · JPL
741984	2006 WO_{38}	—	October 29, 2006	Mount Lemmon	Mount Lemmon Survey	·	1.0 km	MPC · JPL
741985	2006 WC_{48}	—	November 16, 2006	Kitt Peak	Spacewatch	·	1.7 km	MPC · JPL
741986	2006 WY_{52}	—	November 16, 2006	Kitt Peak	Spacewatch	·	620 m	MPC · JPL
741987	2006 WT_{57}	—	October 23, 2006	Catalina	CSS	·	720 m	MPC · JPL
741988	2006 WD_{65}	—	November 17, 2006	Mount Lemmon	Mount Lemmon Survey	·	480 m	MPC · JPL
741989	2006 WP_{66}	—	April 19, 2013	Haleakala	Pan-STARRS 1	·	1.6 km	MPC · JPL
741990	2006 WQ_{70}	—	November 9, 2006	Kitt Peak	Spacewatch	·	1.4 km	MPC · JPL
741991	2006 WD_{73}	—	September 27, 2006	Mount Lemmon	Mount Lemmon Survey	NYS	820 m	MPC · JPL
741992	2006 WH_{73}	—	October 4, 2006	Mount Lemmon	Mount Lemmon Survey	·	1.1 km	MPC · JPL
741993	2006 WS_{77}	—	November 18, 2006	Kitt Peak	Spacewatch	DOR	2.1 km	MPC · JPL
741994	2006 WB_{99}	—	November 19, 2006	Kitt Peak	Spacewatch	KOR	1.1 km	MPC · JPL
741995	2006 WJ_{102}	—	November 11, 2006	Kitt Peak	Spacewatch	·	760 m	MPC · JPL
741996	2006 WN_{107}	—	November 19, 2006	Catalina	CSS	·	940 m	MPC · JPL
741997	2006 WY_{111}	—	November 19, 2006	Kitt Peak	Spacewatch	·	1.2 km	MPC · JPL
741998	2006 WJ_{117}	—	November 20, 2006	Mount Lemmon	Mount Lemmon Survey	·	2.7 km	MPC · JPL
741999	2006 WE_{119}	—	September 30, 2006	Mount Lemmon	Mount Lemmon Survey	·	1.1 km	MPC · JPL
742000	2006 WM_{120}	—	October 21, 2006	Mount Lemmon	Mount Lemmon Survey	·	1.8 km	MPC · JPL

back to top

== Meaning of names ==
As minor planet discoveries are confirmed, they are given a permanent number by the IAU's Minor Planet Center (MPC), and the discoverers can then submit names for them, following the IAU's naming conventions. The list below concerns those minor planets in the specified number-range that have received names, and explains the meanings of those names.

Official naming citations of newly named small Solar System bodies are approved and published in a bulletin by IAU's Working Group for Small Bodies Nomenclature (WGSBN). Before May 2021, citations were published in MPC's Minor Planet Circulars for many decades. Recent citations can also be found on the JPL Small-Body Database (SBDB). Until his death in 2016, German astronomer Lutz D. Schmadel compiled these citations into the Dictionary of Minor Planet Names (DMP) and regularly updated the collection.

Based on Paul Herget's The Names of the Minor Planets, Schmadel also researched the unclear origin of numerous asteroids, most of which had been named prior to World War II. This article incorporates text from this source, which is in the public domain: SBDB New namings may only be added to this list below after official publication as the preannouncement of names is condemned. The WGSBN publishes a comprehensive guideline for the naming rules of non-cometary small Solar System bodies.

Named minor planet	Provisional	This minor planet was named for...	Ref · Catalog
741306 Marshallmccall	2005 UK_{525}	Marshall L. McCall (born 1954), Canadian astrophysicist and professor emeritus at York University.	IAU · 741306
741444 Abbasi	2006 AW_{102}	Viqar Abbasi (born 1973), Canadian technical manager and simulation engineer at the Canadian Space Agency.	IAU · 741444
741647 Davidge	2006 QP_{34}	Tim Davidge (born 1958), Canadian astronomer and Principal Research Officer at the Herzberg Astronomy and Astrophysics of the National Research Council of Canada.	IAU · 741647
741718 Simard	2006 SY_{24}	Luc Simard (born 1968), Canadian Director General of the Herzberg Astronomy and Astrophysics Research Centre of the National Research Council Canada.	IAU · 741718
741821 Lewisknee	2006 TO_{58}	Lewis Knee (born 1961), Canadian Senior Research Officer and Team Leader of the Millimetre Instrumentation Group, Astronomy Technology, at the National Research Council of Canada's Herzberg Astronomy and Astrophysics Research Centre.	IAU · 741821
