= List of minor planets: 663001–664000 =

The following is a partial list of minor planets, running from minor-planet number 663001 through 664000, inclusive. The primary data for this and other partial lists is based on JPL's "Small-Body Orbital Elements" and data available from the Minor Planet Center. Critical list information is also provided by the MPC, unless otherwise specified from Lowell Observatory. A detailed description of the table's columns and additional sources are given on the main page including a complete list of every page in this series, and a statistical break-up on the dynamical classification of minor planets.

Also see the summary list of all named bodies in numerical and alphabetical order, and the corresponding naming citations for the number range of this particular list. New namings may only be added to this list after official publication, as the preannouncement of names is condemned by the Working Group for Small Bodies Nomenclature of the International Astronomical Union.

Near-Earth obj.	MBA (inner)	MBA (outer)	Centaur
Mars-crosser	MBA (middle)	Jupiter trojan	Trans-Neptunian obj.
Unclassified

== 663001–663100 ==
Designation			Discovery			Properties		Ref
Permanent	Provisional	Named after	Date	Site	Discoverer(s)	Category	Diam.	Ref
663001	2006 WQ_{8}	—	November 16, 2006	Kitt Peak	Spacewatch	·	1.9 km	MPC · JPL
663002	2006 WL_{12}	—	November 16, 2006	Mount Lemmon	Mount Lemmon Survey	·	700 m	MPC · JPL
663003	2006 WX_{17}	—	November 1, 2006	Mount Lemmon	Mount Lemmon Survey	·	1.8 km	MPC · JPL
663004	2006 WR_{23}	—	November 17, 2006	Mount Lemmon	Mount Lemmon Survey	·	560 m	MPC · JPL
663005	2006 WU_{29}	—	November 22, 2006	Siding Spring	SSS	AMO	750 m	MPC · JPL
663006	2006 WH_{30}	—	November 23, 2006	Vallemare Borbona	V. S. Casulli	·	2.9 km	MPC · JPL
663007	2006 WS_{41}	—	November 16, 2006	Mount Lemmon	Mount Lemmon Survey	·	850 m	MPC · JPL
663008	2006 WQ_{42}	—	November 16, 2006	Kitt Peak	Spacewatch	·	380 m	MPC · JPL
663009	2006 WT_{46}	—	August 28, 2005	Kitt Peak	Spacewatch	·	2.6 km	MPC · JPL
663010	2006 WB_{50}	—	November 16, 2006	Mount Lemmon	Mount Lemmon Survey	·	500 m	MPC · JPL
663011	2006 WC_{57}	—	November 16, 2006	Kitt Peak	Spacewatch	MAR	770 m	MPC · JPL
663012	2006 WC_{63}	—	November 17, 2006	Mount Lemmon	Mount Lemmon Survey	·	870 m	MPC · JPL
663013	2006 WF_{63}	—	November 17, 2006	Mount Lemmon	Mount Lemmon Survey	·	650 m	MPC · JPL
663014	2006 WV_{64}	—	November 17, 2006	Mount Lemmon	Mount Lemmon Survey	·	930 m	MPC · JPL
663015	2006 WQ_{68}	—	October 21, 2006	Lulin	LUSS	·	1.2 km	MPC · JPL
663016	2006 WE_{69}	—	November 17, 2006	Mount Lemmon	Mount Lemmon Survey	·	840 m	MPC · JPL
663017	2006 WP_{72}	—	October 31, 2006	Mount Lemmon	Mount Lemmon Survey	·	1.9 km	MPC · JPL
663018	2006 WJ_{73}	—	October 27, 2006	Mount Lemmon	Mount Lemmon Survey	·	2.0 km	MPC · JPL
663019	2006 WX_{75}	—	November 18, 2006	Kitt Peak	Spacewatch	H	430 m	MPC · JPL
663020	2006 WL_{79}	—	October 12, 2006	Palomar	NEAT	·	2.5 km	MPC · JPL
663021	2006 WS_{80}	—	November 18, 2006	Kitt Peak	Spacewatch	·	850 m	MPC · JPL
663022	2006 WB_{85}	—	October 22, 1998	Caussols	ODAS	·	1.3 km	MPC · JPL
663023	2006 WK_{98}	—	November 19, 2006	Kitt Peak	Spacewatch	·	1.6 km	MPC · JPL
663024	2006 WK_{104}	—	October 21, 2006	Mount Lemmon	Mount Lemmon Survey	(5)	860 m	MPC · JPL
663025	2006 WD_{107}	—	November 19, 2006	Catalina	CSS	·	2.2 km	MPC · JPL
663026	2006 WF_{114}	—	November 20, 2006	Kitt Peak	Spacewatch	EOS	1.5 km	MPC · JPL
663027	2006 WM_{118}	—	November 20, 2006	Mount Lemmon	Mount Lemmon Survey	·	2.1 km	MPC · JPL
663028	2006 WK_{119}	—	November 2, 2006	Mount Lemmon	Mount Lemmon Survey	·	1.4 km	MPC · JPL
663029	2006 WO_{119}	—	November 21, 2006	Mount Lemmon	Mount Lemmon Survey	·	720 m	MPC · JPL
663030	2006 WK_{121}	—	November 21, 2006	Mount Lemmon	Mount Lemmon Survey	·	550 m	MPC · JPL
663031	2006 WH_{122}	—	November 21, 2006	Mount Lemmon	Mount Lemmon Survey	TEL	1.2 km	MPC · JPL
663032	2006 WV_{124}	—	November 22, 2006	Mount Lemmon	Mount Lemmon Survey	·	640 m	MPC · JPL
663033	2006 WC_{125}	—	November 12, 2006	Mount Lemmon	Mount Lemmon Survey	·	2.1 km	MPC · JPL
663034	2006 WO_{131}	—	November 17, 2006	Kitt Peak	Spacewatch	·	2.3 km	MPC · JPL
663035	2006 WD_{132}	—	November 18, 2006	Kitt Peak	Spacewatch	·	540 m	MPC · JPL
663036	2006 WN_{136}	—	November 19, 2006	Kitt Peak	Spacewatch	·	1.4 km	MPC · JPL
663037	2006 WU_{140}	—	November 20, 2006	Kitt Peak	Spacewatch	·	400 m	MPC · JPL
663038	2006 WO_{143}	—	November 20, 2006	Kitt Peak	Spacewatch	3:2	4.7 km	MPC · JPL
663039	2006 WN_{145}	—	November 20, 2006	Kitt Peak	Spacewatch	BRG	1.4 km	MPC · JPL
663040	2006 WH_{151}	—	October 4, 2006	Mount Lemmon	Mount Lemmon Survey	·	1.7 km	MPC · JPL
663041	2006 WQ_{152}	—	November 21, 2006	Mount Lemmon	Mount Lemmon Survey	·	2.2 km	MPC · JPL
663042	2006 WT_{152}	—	November 21, 2006	Mount Lemmon	Mount Lemmon Survey	·	1.8 km	MPC · JPL
663043	2006 WZ_{154}	—	September 28, 2006	Mount Lemmon	Mount Lemmon Survey	THM	1.7 km	MPC · JPL
663044	2006 WE_{155}	—	November 22, 2006	Kitt Peak	Spacewatch	·	580 m	MPC · JPL
663045	2006 WG_{155}	—	October 21, 2006	Mount Lemmon	Mount Lemmon Survey	·	1.6 km	MPC · JPL
663046	2006 WE_{156}	—	December 14, 2001	Kitt Peak	Spacewatch	·	1.6 km	MPC · JPL
663047	2006 WF_{161}	—	November 15, 2006	Mount Lemmon	Mount Lemmon Survey	·	1.8 km	MPC · JPL
663048	2006 WK_{169}	—	November 23, 2006	Kitt Peak	Spacewatch	AGN	1.1 km	MPC · JPL
663049	2006 WB_{175}	—	November 23, 2006	Kitt Peak	Spacewatch	·	1.7 km	MPC · JPL
663050	2006 WR_{176}	—	November 11, 2006	Mount Lemmon	Mount Lemmon Survey	·	890 m	MPC · JPL
663051	2006 WG_{177}	—	October 23, 2006	Mount Lemmon	Mount Lemmon Survey	TIR	2.0 km	MPC · JPL
663052	2006 WA_{184}	—	November 25, 2006	Mount Lemmon	Mount Lemmon Survey	EMA	2.8 km	MPC · JPL
663053	2006 WD_{192}	—	November 15, 2006	Kitt Peak	Spacewatch	·	700 m	MPC · JPL
663054	2006 WM_{195}	—	November 30, 2006	Kitt Peak	Spacewatch	EUP	2.6 km	MPC · JPL
663055	2006 WE_{201}	—	November 16, 2006	Mount Lemmon	Mount Lemmon Survey	(5)	1.0 km	MPC · JPL
663056	2006 WE_{205}	—	November 19, 2006	Kitt Peak	Spacewatch	·	1.8 km	MPC · JPL
663057	2006 WH_{206}	—	July 15, 2017	Haleakala	Pan-STARRS 1	MAS	620 m	MPC · JPL
663058	2006 WN_{208}	—	November 17, 2006	Mount Lemmon	Mount Lemmon Survey	·	1.8 km	MPC · JPL
663059	2006 WA_{209}	—	November 19, 2006	Catalina	CSS	·	1.3 km	MPC · JPL
663060	2006 WT_{209}	—	November 22, 2006	Kitt Peak	Spacewatch	·	1.1 km	MPC · JPL
663061	2006 WW_{209}	—	October 28, 2011	Mount Lemmon	Mount Lemmon Survey	·	2.1 km	MPC · JPL
663062	2006 WA_{210}	—	February 28, 2014	Haleakala	Pan-STARRS 1	EUP	2.6 km	MPC · JPL
663063	2006 WE_{210}	—	November 17, 2006	Kitt Peak	Spacewatch	·	1.3 km	MPC · JPL
663064	2006 WS_{210}	—	June 21, 2010	Mount Lemmon	Mount Lemmon Survey	·	2.2 km	MPC · JPL
663065	2006 WP_{211}	—	November 17, 2006	Kitt Peak	Spacewatch	·	2.2 km	MPC · JPL
663066	2006 WX_{211}	—	June 11, 2015	Haleakala	Pan-STARRS 1	·	2.3 km	MPC · JPL
663067	2006 WD_{212}	—	February 6, 2013	Kitt Peak	Spacewatch	·	2.0 km	MPC · JPL
663068	2006 WE_{216}	—	January 20, 2015	Haleakala	Pan-STARRS 1	·	910 m	MPC · JPL
663069	2006 WT_{216}	—	November 14, 2015	Mount Lemmon	Mount Lemmon Survey	GEF	1.1 km	MPC · JPL
663070	2006 WZ_{216}	—	February 28, 2008	Kitt Peak	Spacewatch	·	1.5 km	MPC · JPL
663071	2006 WG_{217}	—	February 13, 2008	Mount Lemmon	Mount Lemmon Survey	EUN	1.2 km	MPC · JPL
663072	2006 WQ_{217}	—	September 28, 2009	Mount Lemmon	Mount Lemmon Survey	·	680 m	MPC · JPL
663073	2006 WS_{217}	—	November 16, 2006	Kitt Peak	Spacewatch	·	530 m	MPC · JPL
663074	2006 WD_{218}	—	October 19, 2009	Mount Lemmon	Mount Lemmon Survey	·	570 m	MPC · JPL
663075	2006 WH_{219}	—	May 23, 2014	Haleakala	Pan-STARRS 1	·	2.0 km	MPC · JPL
663076	2006 WN_{220}	—	October 31, 2006	Kitt Peak	Spacewatch	·	730 m	MPC · JPL
663077	2006 WA_{221}	—	November 23, 2006	Mount Lemmon	Mount Lemmon Survey	·	930 m	MPC · JPL
663078	2006 WL_{221}	—	January 4, 2012	Kitt Peak	Spacewatch	·	1.7 km	MPC · JPL
663079	2006 WT_{225}	—	November 27, 2006	Mount Lemmon	Mount Lemmon Survey	3:2	4.0 km	MPC · JPL
663080	2006 WV_{227}	—	February 10, 2008	Mount Lemmon	Mount Lemmon Survey	·	630 m	MPC · JPL
663081	2006 WM_{228}	—	September 6, 2016	Haleakala	Pan-STARRS 1	·	2.1 km	MPC · JPL
663082	2006 WU_{231}	—	November 18, 2006	Kitt Peak	Spacewatch	·	2.6 km	MPC · JPL
663083	2006 WZ_{234}	—	November 17, 2006	Kitt Peak	Spacewatch	·	1.8 km	MPC · JPL
663084	2006 WN_{235}	—	November 16, 2006	Kitt Peak	Spacewatch	·	2.2 km	MPC · JPL
663085	2006 WK_{236}	—	November 28, 2006	Mount Lemmon	Mount Lemmon Survey	·	2.7 km	MPC · JPL
663086	2006 XC_{17}	—	December 10, 2006	Kitt Peak	Spacewatch	·	1.1 km	MPC · JPL
663087	2006 XY_{19}	—	December 1, 2006	Mount Lemmon	Mount Lemmon Survey	·	870 m	MPC · JPL
663088	2006 XD_{32}	—	September 3, 2005	Mauna Kea	Veillet, C.	·	2.1 km	MPC · JPL
663089	2006 XM_{35}	—	December 11, 2006	Kitt Peak	Spacewatch	·	1.3 km	MPC · JPL
663090	2006 XP_{57}	—	November 17, 2006	Mount Lemmon	Mount Lemmon Survey	TIR	2.3 km	MPC · JPL
663091	2006 XU_{57}	—	December 14, 2006	Kitt Peak	Spacewatch	·	1.1 km	MPC · JPL
663092	2006 XZ_{61}	—	December 15, 2006	Kitt Peak	Spacewatch	KON	1.6 km	MPC · JPL
663093	2006 XV_{62}	—	November 15, 2006	Mount Lemmon	Mount Lemmon Survey	·	580 m	MPC · JPL
663094	2006 XH_{63}	—	December 10, 2006	Socorro	LINEAR	·	1.8 km	MPC · JPL
663095	2006 XM_{70}	—	December 15, 2006	Kitt Peak	Spacewatch	·	2.6 km	MPC · JPL
663096	2006 XG_{74}	—	December 14, 2006	Kitt Peak	Spacewatch	TIR	2.2 km	MPC · JPL
663097	2006 XS_{74}	—	January 3, 1997	Kitt Peak	Spacewatch	·	670 m	MPC · JPL
663098	2006 XJ_{75}	—	November 21, 1995	Kitt Peak	Spacewatch	EOS	1.5 km	MPC · JPL
663099	2006 XN_{75}	—	December 11, 2006	Kitt Peak	Spacewatch	·	2.5 km	MPC · JPL
663100	2006 XZ_{75}	—	March 12, 2014	Mount Lemmon	Mount Lemmon Survey	·	580 m	MPC · JPL

== 663101–663200 ==
back to top

Designation			Discovery			Properties		Ref
Permanent	Provisional	Named after	Date	Site	Discoverer(s)	Category	Diam.	Ref
663101	2006 XM_{77}	—	October 24, 2009	Catalina	CSS	·	580 m	MPC · JPL
663102	2006 XY_{79}	—	December 6, 2015	Kitt Peak	Spacewatch	·	1.5 km	MPC · JPL
663103	2006 XX_{80}	—	December 14, 2006	Kitt Peak	Spacewatch	·	2.1 km	MPC · JPL
663104	2006 XY_{80}	—	December 15, 2006	Kitt Peak	Spacewatch	PHO	770 m	MPC · JPL
663105	2006 XT_{81}	—	December 15, 2006	Kitt Peak	Spacewatch	·	1.4 km	MPC · JPL
663106	2006 XZ_{81}	—	December 14, 2006	Kitt Peak	Spacewatch	(5)	800 m	MPC · JPL
663107	2006 YT_{2}	—	December 21, 2006	Wildberg	R. Apitzsch	·	1.1 km	MPC · JPL
663108	2006 YO_{7}	—	December 13, 2006	Catalina	CSS	PHO	890 m	MPC · JPL
663109	2006 YM_{11}	—	November 16, 2006	Mount Lemmon	Mount Lemmon Survey	·	600 m	MPC · JPL
663110	2006 YS_{15}	—	November 28, 2006	Mount Lemmon	Mount Lemmon Survey	NYS	1.1 km	MPC · JPL
663111	2006 YD_{17}	—	December 13, 2006	Mount Lemmon	Mount Lemmon Survey	·	1.1 km	MPC · JPL
663112	2006 YG_{33}	—	December 21, 2006	Kitt Peak	Spacewatch	(5)	1.1 km	MPC · JPL
663113	2006 YU_{34}	—	December 21, 2006	Kitt Peak	Spacewatch	·	1.8 km	MPC · JPL
663114	2006 YP_{41}	—	October 8, 2002	Anderson Mesa	LONEOS	·	1.2 km	MPC · JPL
663115	2006 YQ_{41}	—	December 22, 2006	Socorro	LINEAR	·	2.2 km	MPC · JPL
663116	2006 YL_{53}	—	December 24, 2006	Kitt Peak	Spacewatch	·	1.0 km	MPC · JPL
663117	2006 YJ_{57}	—	December 21, 2006	Kitt Peak	Spacewatch	·	2.7 km	MPC · JPL
663118	2006 YL_{57}	—	May 20, 2014	Haleakala	Pan-STARRS 1	EOS	1.8 km	MPC · JPL
663119	2006 YX_{57}	—	April 16, 2012	Haleakala	Pan-STARRS 1	·	1.3 km	MPC · JPL
663120	2006 YY_{57}	—	December 24, 2006	Kitt Peak	Spacewatch	·	1.2 km	MPC · JPL
663121	2006 YC_{58}	—	March 4, 2013	Haleakala	Pan-STARRS 1	·	2.1 km	MPC · JPL
663122	2006 YP_{58}	—	December 10, 2006	Kitt Peak	Spacewatch	·	2.3 km	MPC · JPL
663123	2006 YM_{60}	—	December 15, 2006	Kitt Peak	Spacewatch	·	1.8 km	MPC · JPL
663124	2006 YV_{60}	—	December 27, 2006	Mount Lemmon	Mount Lemmon Survey	·	2.3 km	MPC · JPL
663125	2006 YG_{61}	—	December 27, 2006	Mount Lemmon	Mount Lemmon Survey	T_{j} (2.97)	2.9 km	MPC · JPL
663126	2006 YR_{62}	—	December 27, 2006	Mount Lemmon	Mount Lemmon Survey	·	510 m	MPC · JPL
663127	2006 YV_{62}	—	August 10, 2015	Haleakala	Pan-STARRS 1	·	560 m	MPC · JPL
663128	2006 YZ_{62}	—	December 3, 2014	Haleakala	Pan-STARRS 1	(5)	1.2 km	MPC · JPL
663129	2006 YR_{64}	—	December 13, 2006	Mount Lemmon	Mount Lemmon Survey	EOS	2.0 km	MPC · JPL
663130	2006 YU_{65}	—	October 25, 2009	Kitt Peak	Spacewatch	·	510 m	MPC · JPL
663131	2006 YX_{66}	—	December 25, 2006	Kitt Peak	Spacewatch	·	870 m	MPC · JPL
663132	2006 YF_{67}	—	December 17, 2006	Mount Lemmon	Mount Lemmon Survey	·	1.8 km	MPC · JPL
663133	2006 YF_{69}	—	December 21, 2006	Mount Lemmon	Mount Lemmon Survey	T_{j} (2.98)	2.8 km	MPC · JPL
663134	2006 YP_{69}	—	December 20, 2006	Catalina	CSS	T_{j} (2.99)	2.6 km	MPC · JPL
663135	2007 AM_{4}	—	December 27, 2006	Kitt Peak	Spacewatch	·	2.2 km	MPC · JPL
663136	2007 AT_{6}	—	January 9, 2007	Kitt Peak	Spacewatch	·	1.7 km	MPC · JPL
663137	2007 AX_{13}	—	December 16, 2006	Kitt Peak	Spacewatch	·	2.0 km	MPC · JPL
663138	2007 AB_{22}	—	January 15, 2007	Kitt Peak	Spacewatch	NYS	1.4 km	MPC · JPL
663139	2007 AX_{31}	—	January 9, 2007	Mount Lemmon	Mount Lemmon Survey	PHO	550 m	MPC · JPL
663140	2007 AH_{32}	—	January 10, 2007	Mount Lemmon	Mount Lemmon Survey	·	2.1 km	MPC · JPL
663141	2007 AX_{32}	—	December 21, 2006	Mount Lemmon	Mount Lemmon Survey	·	2.2 km	MPC · JPL
663142	2007 AH_{33}	—	October 27, 2009	Mount Lemmon	Mount Lemmon Survey	·	540 m	MPC · JPL
663143	2007 AN_{33}	—	January 10, 2007	Mount Lemmon	Mount Lemmon Survey	·	2.1 km	MPC · JPL
663144	2007 AX_{35}	—	January 8, 2007	Mount Lemmon	Mount Lemmon Survey	·	1.2 km	MPC · JPL
663145	2007 BG_{7}	—	January 23, 2007	Bergisch Gladbach	W. Bickel	·	2.0 km	MPC · JPL
663146	2007 BM_{19}	—	January 21, 2007	Socorro	LINEAR	BAR	1.2 km	MPC · JPL
663147	2007 BG_{26}	—	December 24, 2006	Kitt Peak	Spacewatch	·	1.6 km	MPC · JPL
663148	2007 BC_{33}	—	January 24, 2007	Mount Lemmon	Mount Lemmon Survey	(5)	810 m	MPC · JPL
663149	2007 BE_{41}	—	January 24, 2007	Mount Lemmon	Mount Lemmon Survey	·	2.4 km	MPC · JPL
663150	2007 BP_{45}	—	January 25, 2007	Kitt Peak	Spacewatch	HOF	2.7 km	MPC · JPL
663151	2007 BQ_{49}	—	January 24, 2007	Mount Lemmon	Mount Lemmon Survey	·	2.4 km	MPC · JPL
663152	2007 BG_{51}	—	January 24, 2007	Kitt Peak	Spacewatch	AGN	1.1 km	MPC · JPL
663153	2007 BY_{51}	—	January 24, 2007	Kitt Peak	Spacewatch	H	530 m	MPC · JPL
663154	2007 BA_{54}	—	December 27, 2006	Mount Lemmon	Mount Lemmon Survey	·	2.1 km	MPC · JPL
663155	2007 BJ_{55}	—	September 11, 2005	Kitt Peak	Spacewatch	·	2.1 km	MPC · JPL
663156	2007 BL_{63}	—	January 27, 2007	Kitt Peak	Spacewatch	H	590 m	MPC · JPL
663157	2007 BK_{67}	—	January 27, 2007	Mount Lemmon	Mount Lemmon Survey	·	1.4 km	MPC · JPL
663158	2007 BL_{71}	—	January 28, 2007	Mount Lemmon	Mount Lemmon Survey	MAR	870 m	MPC · JPL
663159	2007 BS_{73}	—	January 27, 2007	Kitt Peak	Spacewatch	·	560 m	MPC · JPL
663160	2007 BF_{76}	—	March 9, 2011	Moletai	K. Černis	NYS	840 m	MPC · JPL
663161	2007 BY_{76}	—	November 27, 2006	Mount Lemmon	Mount Lemmon Survey	·	970 m	MPC · JPL
663162	2007 BJ_{88}	—	January 24, 2007	Mount Lemmon	Mount Lemmon Survey	AST	1.6 km	MPC · JPL
663163	2007 BU_{97}	—	January 19, 2007	Mauna Kea	P. A. Wiegert	·	2.7 km	MPC · JPL
663164	2007 BE_{98}	—	January 19, 2007	Mauna Kea	P. A. Wiegert	·	2.1 km	MPC · JPL
663165	2007 BO_{103}	—	January 10, 2007	Mount Lemmon	Mount Lemmon Survey	·	2.2 km	MPC · JPL
663166	2007 BN_{104}	—	May 3, 2008	Mount Lemmon	Mount Lemmon Survey	·	2.6 km	MPC · JPL
663167	2007 BD_{106}	—	September 25, 2016	Haleakala	Pan-STARRS 1	·	2.7 km	MPC · JPL
663168	2007 BR_{106}	—	January 17, 2007	Kitt Peak	Spacewatch	·	2.5 km	MPC · JPL
663169	2007 BO_{107}	—	August 27, 2016	Haleakala	Pan-STARRS 1	·	2.3 km	MPC · JPL
663170	2007 BX_{108}	—	August 14, 2012	Siding Spring	SSS	PHO	1.2 km	MPC · JPL
663171	2007 BE_{109}	—	November 23, 2009	Mount Lemmon	Mount Lemmon Survey	·	550 m	MPC · JPL
663172	2007 BF_{109}	—	August 13, 2015	Haleakala	Pan-STARRS 1	VER	2.2 km	MPC · JPL
663173	2007 BK_{109}	—	January 17, 2007	Kitt Peak	Spacewatch	·	620 m	MPC · JPL
663174	2007 BO_{109}	—	January 15, 2007	Kitt Peak	Spacewatch	·	2.7 km	MPC · JPL
663175	2007 BU_{109}	—	January 3, 2016	Haleakala	Pan-STARRS 1	·	1.5 km	MPC · JPL
663176	2007 BW_{109}	—	January 26, 2007	Kitt Peak	Spacewatch	·	2.7 km	MPC · JPL
663177	2007 BD_{111}	—	January 17, 2007	Kitt Peak	Spacewatch	(5)	920 m	MPC · JPL
663178	2007 BM_{111}	—	January 29, 2007	Kitt Peak	Spacewatch	H	380 m	MPC · JPL
663179	2007 BV_{111}	—	January 26, 2007	Kitt Peak	Spacewatch	·	2.3 km	MPC · JPL
663180	2007 BO_{112}	—	January 12, 2011	Kitt Peak	Spacewatch	(5)	1.1 km	MPC · JPL
663181	2007 BR_{112}	—	January 27, 2007	Kitt Peak	Spacewatch	·	590 m	MPC · JPL
663182	2007 BG_{113}	—	May 23, 2014	Haleakala	Pan-STARRS 1	·	2.7 km	MPC · JPL
663183	2007 BP_{113}	—	January 29, 2007	Kitt Peak	Spacewatch	·	510 m	MPC · JPL
663184	2007 BX_{114}	—	January 27, 2007	Mount Lemmon	Mount Lemmon Survey	·	920 m	MPC · JPL
663185	2007 BK_{115}	—	January 24, 2007	Mount Lemmon	Mount Lemmon Survey	·	860 m	MPC · JPL
663186	2007 BC_{116}	—	January 17, 2007	Mount Lemmon	Mount Lemmon Survey	·	1.7 km	MPC · JPL
663187	2007 BH_{116}	—	January 17, 2007	Kitt Peak	Spacewatch	·	1.0 km	MPC · JPL
663188	2007 BW_{116}	—	January 28, 2007	Mount Lemmon	Mount Lemmon Survey	·	1.2 km	MPC · JPL
663189	2007 BC_{117}	—	August 18, 2004	La Palma-NEON	Palma-NEON, La	·	2.8 km	MPC · JPL
663190	2007 BW_{118}	—	January 27, 2007	Mount Lemmon	Mount Lemmon Survey	·	960 m	MPC · JPL
663191	2007 CB_{10}	—	February 6, 2007	Mount Lemmon	Mount Lemmon Survey	·	2.1 km	MPC · JPL
663192	2007 CU_{15}	—	November 21, 2006	Catalina	CSS	·	2.9 km	MPC · JPL
663193	2007 CA_{18}	—	February 8, 2007	Mount Lemmon	Mount Lemmon Survey	·	1.2 km	MPC · JPL
663194	2007 CU_{24}	—	January 24, 2007	Catalina	CSS	·	1.1 km	MPC · JPL
663195	2007 CT_{27}	—	January 27, 2007	Kitt Peak	Spacewatch	·	1.5 km	MPC · JPL
663196	2007 CU_{32}	—	February 6, 2007	Mount Lemmon	Mount Lemmon Survey	·	2.6 km	MPC · JPL
663197	2007 CS_{34}	—	February 6, 2007	Mount Lemmon	Mount Lemmon Survey	NYS	1.0 km	MPC · JPL
663198	2007 CE_{36}	—	January 17, 2007	Kitt Peak	Spacewatch	·	490 m	MPC · JPL
663199	2007 CZ_{39}	—	February 6, 2007	Mount Lemmon	Mount Lemmon Survey	MAR	860 m	MPC · JPL
663200	2007 CO_{49}	—	February 10, 2007	Mount Lemmon	Mount Lemmon Survey	·	2.4 km	MPC · JPL

== 663201–663300 ==
back to top

Designation			Discovery			Properties		Ref
Permanent	Provisional	Named after	Date	Site	Discoverer(s)	Category	Diam.	Ref
663201	2007 CH_{53}	—	January 10, 2007	Mount Lemmon	Mount Lemmon Survey	T_{j} (2.98)	2.5 km	MPC · JPL
663202	2007 CT_{53}	—	February 16, 2007	Catalina	CSS	·	4.3 km	MPC · JPL
663203	2007 CZ_{56}	—	July 19, 2001	Palomar	NEAT	·	1.7 km	MPC · JPL
663204	2007 CZ_{60}	—	February 10, 2007	Catalina	CSS	·	1.1 km	MPC · JPL
663205	2007 CZ_{64}	—	January 27, 2007	Kitt Peak	Spacewatch	·	1.0 km	MPC · JPL
663206	2007 CJ_{67}	—	February 13, 2007	Mount Lemmon	Mount Lemmon Survey	·	1.0 km	MPC · JPL
663207	2007 CZ_{72}	—	February 14, 2007	Mauna Kea	P. A. Wiegert	·	2.3 km	MPC · JPL
663208	2007 CB_{81}	—	February 8, 2007	Mount Lemmon	Mount Lemmon Survey	·	1.4 km	MPC · JPL
663209	2007 CS_{81}	—	February 9, 2007	Mount Lemmon	Mount Lemmon Survey	·	2.2 km	MPC · JPL
663210	2007 CX_{81}	—	March 13, 2013	Mount Lemmon	Mount Lemmon Survey	·	2.2 km	MPC · JPL
663211	2007 CA_{84}	—	February 6, 2007	Mount Lemmon	Mount Lemmon Survey	·	960 m	MPC · JPL
663212	2007 CD_{84}	—	February 9, 2007	Kitt Peak	Spacewatch	·	850 m	MPC · JPL
663213	2007 CL_{84}	—	February 10, 2007	Mount Lemmon	Mount Lemmon Survey	·	1.2 km	MPC · JPL
663214	2007 CL_{85}	—	December 26, 2006	Kitt Peak	Spacewatch	·	480 m	MPC · JPL
663215	2007 DG_{6}	—	February 17, 2007	Kitt Peak	Spacewatch	·	1.0 km	MPC · JPL
663216	2007 DK_{8}	—	February 17, 2007	Kitt Peak	Spacewatch	APO	530 m	MPC · JPL
663217	2007 DH_{9}	—	February 17, 2007	Kitt Peak	Spacewatch	·	510 m	MPC · JPL
663218	2007 DR_{9}	—	February 17, 2007	Kitt Peak	Spacewatch	T_{j} (2.91)	3.4 km	MPC · JPL
663219	2007 DF_{11}	—	February 17, 2007	Mount Lemmon	Mount Lemmon Survey	·	530 m	MPC · JPL
663220	2007 DY_{13}	—	January 27, 2007	Mount Lemmon	Mount Lemmon Survey	·	2.3 km	MPC · JPL
663221	2007 DG_{14}	—	January 28, 2007	Mount Lemmon	Mount Lemmon Survey	·	1.5 km	MPC · JPL
663222	2007 DA_{17}	—	February 17, 2007	Kitt Peak	Spacewatch	EOS	1.8 km	MPC · JPL
663223	2007 DM_{17}	—	February 17, 2007	Kitt Peak	Spacewatch	·	1.4 km	MPC · JPL
663224	2007 DM_{20}	—	February 17, 2007	Kitt Peak	Spacewatch	·	460 m	MPC · JPL
663225	2007 DS_{26}	—	February 17, 2007	Kitt Peak	Spacewatch	·	3.6 km	MPC · JPL
663226	2007 DB_{27}	—	February 17, 2007	Kitt Peak	Spacewatch	·	540 m	MPC · JPL
663227	2007 DC_{27}	—	April 3, 2002	Kitt Peak	Spacewatch	·	2.4 km	MPC · JPL
663228	2007 DF_{28}	—	February 17, 2007	Kitt Peak	Spacewatch	·	2.5 km	MPC · JPL
663229	2007 DZ_{42}	—	February 17, 2007	Catalina	CSS	·	1.1 km	MPC · JPL
663230	2007 DY_{43}	—	February 17, 2007	Mount Lemmon	Mount Lemmon Survey	·	1.6 km	MPC · JPL
663231	2007 DK_{56}	—	January 27, 2007	Mount Lemmon	Mount Lemmon Survey	·	980 m	MPC · JPL
663232	2007 DO_{61}	—	February 19, 2007	Mount Lemmon	Mount Lemmon Survey	·	2.6 km	MPC · JPL
663233	2007 DQ_{62}	—	February 8, 2007	Kitt Peak	Spacewatch	·	970 m	MPC · JPL
663234	2007 DZ_{63}	—	February 21, 2007	Kitt Peak	Spacewatch	(1547)	1.1 km	MPC · JPL
663235	2007 DG_{68}	—	April 8, 2002	Palomar	NEAT	·	2.1 km	MPC · JPL
663236	2007 DX_{68}	—	February 21, 2007	Kitt Peak	Spacewatch	(5)	980 m	MPC · JPL
663237	2007 DR_{70}	—	February 21, 2007	Kitt Peak	Spacewatch	·	2.8 km	MPC · JPL
663238	2007 DM_{78}	—	February 23, 2007	Kitt Peak	Spacewatch	·	1.7 km	MPC · JPL
663239	2007 DP_{79}	—	February 23, 2007	Kitt Peak	Spacewatch	THM	2.0 km	MPC · JPL
663240	2007 DY_{80}	—	February 23, 2007	Mount Lemmon	Mount Lemmon Survey	HNS	890 m	MPC · JPL
663241	2007 DH_{81}	—	October 2, 2005	Mount Lemmon	Mount Lemmon Survey	·	2.0 km	MPC · JPL
663242	2007 DA_{82}	—	August 23, 2004	Kitt Peak	Spacewatch	EOS	2.1 km	MPC · JPL
663243	2007 DX_{84}	—	February 21, 2007	Charleston	R. Holmes	·	1.3 km	MPC · JPL
663244	2007 DX_{89}	—	January 28, 2007	Mount Lemmon	Mount Lemmon Survey	·	960 m	MPC · JPL
663245	2007 DB_{90}	—	February 23, 2007	Kitt Peak	Spacewatch	·	950 m	MPC · JPL
663246	2007 DW_{96}	—	February 17, 2007	Mount Lemmon	Mount Lemmon Survey	·	1.0 km	MPC · JPL
663247	2007 DQ_{98}	—	February 25, 2007	Mount Lemmon	Mount Lemmon Survey	·	2.2 km	MPC · JPL
663248	2007 DB_{99}	—	January 27, 2007	Mount Lemmon	Mount Lemmon Survey	·	1.2 km	MPC · JPL
663249	2007 DQ_{103}	—	February 25, 2007	Kitt Peak	Spacewatch	TIR	2.1 km	MPC · JPL
663250	2007 DN_{108}	—	March 9, 2007	Mount Lemmon	Mount Lemmon Survey	·	980 m	MPC · JPL
663251	2007 DN_{119}	—	October 7, 2005	Anderson Mesa	LONEOS	·	770 m	MPC · JPL
663252	2007 DK_{120}	—	February 25, 2007	Mount Lemmon	Mount Lemmon Survey	·	2.5 km	MPC · JPL
663253	2007 DH_{121}	—	March 13, 2013	Kitt Peak	Spacewatch	·	2.5 km	MPC · JPL
663254	2007 DY_{121}	—	October 28, 2017	Haleakala	Pan-STARRS 1	·	2.4 km	MPC · JPL
663255	2007 DA_{123}	—	January 14, 2018	Mount Lemmon	Mount Lemmon Survey	·	2.8 km	MPC · JPL
663256	2007 DO_{123}	—	July 28, 2009	Kitt Peak	Spacewatch	·	2.7 km	MPC · JPL
663257	2007 DF_{124}	—	November 21, 2014	Haleakala	Pan-STARRS 1	·	1.3 km	MPC · JPL
663258	2007 DY_{126}	—	February 21, 2007	Mount Lemmon	Mount Lemmon Survey	TIR	2.3 km	MPC · JPL
663259	2007 DC_{128}	—	April 1, 2003	Apache Point	SDSS Collaboration	·	1.1 km	MPC · JPL
663260	2007 DC_{132}	—	February 25, 2007	Kitt Peak	Spacewatch	VER	2.3 km	MPC · JPL
663261	2007 DD_{132}	—	February 17, 2007	Kitt Peak	Spacewatch	VER	2.2 km	MPC · JPL
663262	2007 DF_{133}	—	February 22, 2007	Kitt Peak	Spacewatch	NYS	870 m	MPC · JPL
663263	2007 ER_{1}	—	March 9, 2007	Kitt Peak	Spacewatch	VER	2.1 km	MPC · JPL
663264	2007 EJ_{5}	—	September 15, 2004	Kitt Peak	Spacewatch	·	2.6 km	MPC · JPL
663265	2007 EN_{11}	—	February 8, 2007	Kitt Peak	Spacewatch	PHO	760 m	MPC · JPL
663266	2007 EV_{19}	—	March 10, 2007	Mount Lemmon	Mount Lemmon Survey	·	780 m	MPC · JPL
663267	2007 EF_{20}	—	January 27, 2007	Mount Lemmon	Mount Lemmon Survey	V	650 m	MPC · JPL
663268	2007 EK_{21}	—	March 10, 2007	Kitt Peak	Spacewatch	EUN	910 m	MPC · JPL
663269	2007 EX_{21}	—	March 10, 2007	Mount Lemmon	Mount Lemmon Survey	·	1.4 km	MPC · JPL
663270	2007 EK_{22}	—	October 9, 2004	Kitt Peak	Spacewatch	·	2.2 km	MPC · JPL
663271 Heinzreinhardt	2007 EW_{26}	Heinzreinhardt	March 11, 2007	Bergen-Enkheim	Suessenberger, U.	·	1.2 km	MPC · JPL
663272	2007 EL_{29}	—	March 9, 2007	Kitt Peak	Spacewatch	·	3.3 km	MPC · JPL
663273	2007 EG_{32}	—	March 10, 2007	Kitt Peak	Spacewatch	·	1.1 km	MPC · JPL
663274	2007 EV_{35}	—	March 11, 2007	Mount Lemmon	Mount Lemmon Survey	·	1.8 km	MPC · JPL
663275	2007 EE_{36}	—	March 11, 2007	Kitt Peak	Spacewatch	·	2.5 km	MPC · JPL
663276	2007 EM_{44}	—	February 22, 2007	Kitt Peak	Spacewatch	·	2.7 km	MPC · JPL
663277	2007 EO_{49}	—	March 10, 2007	Mount Lemmon	Mount Lemmon Survey	·	2.5 km	MPC · JPL
663278	2007 EF_{64}	—	November 22, 2005	Kitt Peak	Spacewatch	·	2.3 km	MPC · JPL
663279	2007 ED_{66}	—	March 10, 2007	Kitt Peak	Spacewatch	NYS	1.0 km	MPC · JPL
663280	2007 EG_{70}	—	March 10, 2007	Mount Lemmon	Mount Lemmon Survey	LIX	3.1 km	MPC · JPL
663281	2007 ER_{72}	—	March 10, 2007	Kitt Peak	Spacewatch	BAR	1.0 km	MPC · JPL
663282	2007 EV_{75}	—	March 10, 2007	Mount Lemmon	Mount Lemmon Survey	·	1.2 km	MPC · JPL
663283	2007 EK_{76}	—	March 10, 2007	Kitt Peak	Spacewatch	·	1.4 km	MPC · JPL
663284	2007 EN_{76}	—	July 24, 2003	Wise	Polishook, D.	·	3.1 km	MPC · JPL
663285	2007 EC_{81}	—	February 23, 2007	Kitt Peak	Spacewatch	·	1.1 km	MPC · JPL
663286	2007 EH_{81}	—	February 25, 2007	Mount Lemmon	Mount Lemmon Survey	·	3.7 km	MPC · JPL
663287	2007 ET_{92}	—	January 27, 2007	Kitt Peak	Spacewatch	·	2.0 km	MPC · JPL
663288	2007 EV_{95}	—	December 1, 2005	Kitt Peak	Spacewatch	·	1.2 km	MPC · JPL
663289	2007 EO_{101}	—	March 11, 2007	Kitt Peak	Spacewatch	·	1.3 km	MPC · JPL
663290	2007 EN_{104}	—	February 25, 2007	Mount Lemmon	Mount Lemmon Survey	DOR	2.0 km	MPC · JPL
663291	2007 ED_{106}	—	March 11, 2007	Kitt Peak	Spacewatch	·	2.7 km	MPC · JPL
663292	2007 EA_{108}	—	March 11, 2007	Kitt Peak	Spacewatch	·	1.0 km	MPC · JPL
663293	2007 ER_{115}	—	February 8, 2002	Kitt Peak	Spacewatch	·	2.2 km	MPC · JPL
663294	2007 EV_{119}	—	March 13, 2007	Mount Lemmon	Mount Lemmon Survey	·	2.6 km	MPC · JPL
663295	2007 EB_{122}	—	May 15, 2004	Socorro	LINEAR	·	880 m	MPC · JPL
663296	2007 EA_{129}	—	March 9, 2007	Mount Lemmon	Mount Lemmon Survey	·	1.2 km	MPC · JPL
663297	2007 EX_{139}	—	February 21, 2007	Mount Lemmon	Mount Lemmon Survey	·	1.3 km	MPC · JPL
663298	2007 EP_{142}	—	March 12, 2007	Kitt Peak	Spacewatch	·	1.2 km	MPC · JPL
663299	2007 EY_{145}	—	February 26, 2007	Mount Lemmon	Mount Lemmon Survey	·	870 m	MPC · JPL
663300	2007 EP_{146}	—	March 12, 2007	Mount Lemmon	Mount Lemmon Survey	·	580 m	MPC · JPL

== 663301–663400 ==
back to top

Designation			Discovery			Properties		Ref
Permanent	Provisional	Named after	Date	Site	Discoverer(s)	Category	Diam.	Ref
663301	2007 EY_{148}	—	March 12, 2007	Mount Lemmon	Mount Lemmon Survey	·	2.4 km	MPC · JPL
663302	2007 EZ_{150}	—	March 12, 2007	Mount Lemmon	Mount Lemmon Survey	·	2.9 km	MPC · JPL
663303	2007 ES_{153}	—	March 12, 2007	Mount Lemmon	Mount Lemmon Survey	·	3.1 km	MPC · JPL
663304	2007 EJ_{161}	—	March 15, 2007	Kitt Peak	Spacewatch	·	2.2 km	MPC · JPL
663305	2007 EH_{165}	—	March 15, 2007	Mount Lemmon	Mount Lemmon Survey	·	670 m	MPC · JPL
663306	2007 EE_{169}	—	March 13, 2007	Kitt Peak	Spacewatch	HYG	2.3 km	MPC · JPL
663307	2007 ED_{172}	—	March 14, 2007	Kitt Peak	Spacewatch	·	2.4 km	MPC · JPL
663308	2007 EB_{179}	—	September 21, 2003	Kitt Peak	Spacewatch	·	3.8 km	MPC · JPL
663309	2007 EM_{186}	—	March 15, 2007	Mount Lemmon	Mount Lemmon Survey	·	1.6 km	MPC · JPL
663310	2007 EQ_{187}	—	March 15, 2007	Mount Lemmon	Mount Lemmon Survey	·	2.6 km	MPC · JPL
663311	2007 EM_{189}	—	November 12, 2005	Kitt Peak	Spacewatch	·	730 m	MPC · JPL
663312	2007 EZ_{192}	—	March 14, 2007	Kitt Peak	Spacewatch	H	480 m	MPC · JPL
663313	2007 EX_{206}	—	March 26, 2001	Kitt Peak	Spacewatch	·	2.9 km	MPC · JPL
663314	2007 EM_{209}	—	March 15, 2007	Kitt Peak	Spacewatch	·	2.4 km	MPC · JPL
663315	2007 ES_{220}	—	March 11, 2007	Mount Lemmon	Mount Lemmon Survey	·	1.3 km	MPC · JPL
663316	2007 EO_{223}	—	March 9, 2007	Kitt Peak	Spacewatch	THM	1.8 km	MPC · JPL
663317	2007 ET_{226}	—	March 9, 2007	Mount Lemmon	Mount Lemmon Survey	·	650 m	MPC · JPL
663318	2007 EO_{227}	—	October 22, 2008	Mount Lemmon	Mount Lemmon Survey	·	690 m	MPC · JPL
663319	2007 EV_{228}	—	September 12, 2016	Haleakala	Pan-STARRS 1	·	2.0 km	MPC · JPL
663320	2007 EE_{229}	—	March 11, 2007	Kitt Peak	Spacewatch	·	1.2 km	MPC · JPL
663321	2007 EM_{232}	—	April 20, 2014	Kitt Peak	Spacewatch	·	590 m	MPC · JPL
663322	2007 EW_{232}	—	January 3, 2017	Haleakala	Pan-STARRS 1	·	2.9 km	MPC · JPL
663323	2007 EA_{233}	—	September 1, 2013	Mount Lemmon	Mount Lemmon Survey	·	1.3 km	MPC · JPL
663324	2007 ET_{237}	—	December 4, 2016	Mount Lemmon	Mount Lemmon Survey	·	520 m	MPC · JPL
663325	2007 EA_{238}	—	January 29, 2014	Kitt Peak	Spacewatch	·	780 m	MPC · JPL
663326	2007 EZ_{238}	—	March 14, 2007	Kitt Peak	Spacewatch	·	1.3 km	MPC · JPL
663327	2007 EU_{243}	—	March 9, 2007	Mount Lemmon	Mount Lemmon Survey	·	1.2 km	MPC · JPL
663328	2007 FV_{1}	—	March 9, 2007	Kitt Peak	Spacewatch	·	1.5 km	MPC · JPL
663329	2007 FG_{5}	—	March 16, 2007	Kitt Peak	Spacewatch	·	570 m	MPC · JPL
663330	2007 FA_{7}	—	March 16, 2007	Mount Lemmon	Mount Lemmon Survey	·	1.1 km	MPC · JPL
663331	2007 FP_{9}	—	March 16, 2007	Kitt Peak	Spacewatch	EOS	1.8 km	MPC · JPL
663332	2007 FF_{13}	—	March 19, 2007	Catalina	CSS	·	850 m	MPC · JPL
663333	2007 FN_{14}	—	March 19, 2007	Mount Lemmon	Mount Lemmon Survey	·	670 m	MPC · JPL
663334	2007 FQ_{14}	—	March 19, 2007	Mount Lemmon	Mount Lemmon Survey	·	1.2 km	MPC · JPL
663335	2007 FY_{16}	—	March 10, 2007	Mount Lemmon	Mount Lemmon Survey	·	1.2 km	MPC · JPL
663336	2007 FS_{17}	—	March 20, 2007	Mount Lemmon	Mount Lemmon Survey	·	1.3 km	MPC · JPL
663337	2007 FR_{18}	—	March 10, 2007	Mount Lemmon	Mount Lemmon Survey	EUP	2.2 km	MPC · JPL
663338	2007 FL_{27}	—	February 23, 2007	Kitt Peak	Spacewatch	HNS	920 m	MPC · JPL
663339	2007 FR_{29}	—	March 20, 2007	Mount Lemmon	Mount Lemmon Survey	·	1.2 km	MPC · JPL
663340	2007 FF_{36}	—	March 26, 2007	Mount Lemmon	Mount Lemmon Survey	·	940 m	MPC · JPL
663341	2007 FH_{36}	—	March 26, 2007	Mount Lemmon	Mount Lemmon Survey	·	1.3 km	MPC · JPL
663342	2007 FK_{42}	—	March 10, 2007	Kitt Peak	Spacewatch	·	1.2 km	MPC · JPL
663343	2007 FF_{43}	—	February 20, 2007	Siding Spring	SSS	·	4.5 km	MPC · JPL
663344	2007 FA_{44}	—	November 5, 1999	Kitt Peak	Spacewatch	THM	2.1 km	MPC · JPL
663345	2007 FS_{52}	—	March 20, 2007	Mount Lemmon	Mount Lemmon Survey	·	650 m	MPC · JPL
663346	2007 FV_{52}	—	March 25, 2007	Mount Lemmon	Mount Lemmon Survey	·	1.5 km	MPC · JPL
663347	2007 FM_{53}	—	March 26, 2007	Kitt Peak	Spacewatch	·	3.0 km	MPC · JPL
663348	2007 FC_{54}	—	October 14, 2012	Kitt Peak	Spacewatch	·	670 m	MPC · JPL
663349	2007 FA_{56}	—	March 19, 2007	Mount Lemmon	Mount Lemmon Survey	EOS	1.7 km	MPC · JPL
663350	2007 FH_{56}	—	January 28, 2000	Kitt Peak	Spacewatch	·	450 m	MPC · JPL
663351	2007 FE_{60}	—	March 20, 2007	Mount Lemmon	Mount Lemmon Survey	·	960 m	MPC · JPL
663352	2007 FF_{60}	—	March 20, 2007	Mount Lemmon	Mount Lemmon Survey	·	1.2 km	MPC · JPL
663353	2007 FH_{60}	—	March 16, 2007	Kitt Peak	Spacewatch	·	1.1 km	MPC · JPL
663354	2007 FP_{62}	—	March 16, 2007	Mount Lemmon	Mount Lemmon Survey	·	510 m	MPC · JPL
663355	2007 FT_{63}	—	March 26, 2007	Mount Lemmon	Mount Lemmon Survey	·	2.8 km	MPC · JPL
663356	2007 GX_{9}	—	April 11, 2007	Kitt Peak	Spacewatch	VER	3.2 km	MPC · JPL
663357	2007 GB_{13}	—	March 17, 2007	Anderson Mesa	LONEOS	·	1.0 km	MPC · JPL
663358	2007 GX_{15}	—	March 16, 2007	Mount Lemmon	Mount Lemmon Survey	·	1.2 km	MPC · JPL
663359	2007 GL_{22}	—	April 11, 2007	Mount Lemmon	Mount Lemmon Survey	HNS	1.1 km	MPC · JPL
663360	2007 GX_{22}	—	April 11, 2007	Mount Lemmon	Mount Lemmon Survey	·	2.5 km	MPC · JPL
663361	2007 GV_{23}	—	April 11, 2007	Kitt Peak	Spacewatch	·	1.1 km	MPC · JPL
663362	2007 GM_{26}	—	April 14, 2007	Kitt Peak	Spacewatch	·	550 m	MPC · JPL
663363	2007 GP_{26}	—	April 14, 2007	Kitt Peak	Spacewatch	·	550 m	MPC · JPL
663364	2007 GE_{35}	—	April 14, 2007	Kitt Peak	Spacewatch	·	1.2 km	MPC · JPL
663365	2007 GV_{36}	—	March 29, 2007	Kitt Peak	Spacewatch	·	2.6 km	MPC · JPL
663366	2007 GC_{37}	—	April 14, 2007	Kitt Peak	Spacewatch	·	650 m	MPC · JPL
663367	2007 GB_{39}	—	March 26, 2007	Mount Lemmon	Mount Lemmon Survey	·	480 m	MPC · JPL
663368	2007 GK_{43}	—	September 22, 2003	Kitt Peak	Spacewatch	EOS	1.5 km	MPC · JPL
663369	2007 GC_{58}	—	March 13, 2007	Mount Lemmon	Mount Lemmon Survey	·	1.2 km	MPC · JPL
663370	2007 GJ_{65}	—	April 15, 2007	Kitt Peak	Spacewatch	·	500 m	MPC · JPL
663371	2007 GA_{71}	—	April 15, 2007	Mount Lemmon	Mount Lemmon Survey	·	2.7 km	MPC · JPL
663372	2007 GR_{71}	—	April 7, 2007	Mauna Kea	D. D. Balam, K. M. Perrett	·	2.3 km	MPC · JPL
663373	2007 GM_{78}	—	November 24, 2017	Haleakala	Pan-STARRS 1	·	1.4 km	MPC · JPL
663374	2007 GP_{78}	—	October 14, 2009	Mount Lemmon	Mount Lemmon Survey	HNS	890 m	MPC · JPL
663375	2007 GB_{79}	—	April 15, 2007	Catalina	CSS	EUN	1.3 km	MPC · JPL
663376	2007 GE_{79}	—	June 30, 2014	Haleakala	Pan-STARRS 1	·	2.8 km	MPC · JPL
663377	2007 HZ_{3}	—	March 31, 2007	Palomar	NEAT	·	1.3 km	MPC · JPL
663378	2007 HJ_{8}	—	March 14, 2007	Mount Lemmon	Mount Lemmon Survey	V	560 m	MPC · JPL
663379	2007 HG_{9}	—	August 25, 2001	Kitt Peak	Spacewatch	·	560 m	MPC · JPL
663380	2007 HL_{10}	—	April 18, 2007	Mount Lemmon	Mount Lemmon Survey	·	2.7 km	MPC · JPL
663381	2007 HS_{15}	—	March 25, 2007	Mount Lemmon	Mount Lemmon Survey	EUN	1.2 km	MPC · JPL
663382	2007 HA_{20}	—	April 18, 2007	Kitt Peak	Spacewatch	·	2.1 km	MPC · JPL
663383	2007 HT_{30}	—	October 22, 2003	Apache Point	SDSS Collaboration	HYG	2.8 km	MPC · JPL
663384	2007 HK_{32}	—	April 19, 2007	Mount Lemmon	Mount Lemmon Survey	EOS	1.9 km	MPC · JPL
663385	2007 HL_{34}	—	April 19, 2007	Kitt Peak	Spacewatch	EUN	890 m	MPC · JPL
663386	2007 HS_{50}	—	April 20, 2007	Kitt Peak	Spacewatch	EUN	1.5 km	MPC · JPL
663387	2007 HC_{54}	—	April 22, 2007	Kitt Peak	Spacewatch	·	1.3 km	MPC · JPL
663388	2007 HD_{56}	—	April 22, 2007	Kitt Peak	Spacewatch	HYG	2.2 km	MPC · JPL
663389	2007 HN_{60}	—	April 20, 2007	Mount Lemmon	Mount Lemmon Survey	·	460 m	MPC · JPL
663390	2007 HZ_{60}	—	April 20, 2007	Kitt Peak	Spacewatch	·	1.6 km	MPC · JPL
663391	2007 HO_{64}	—	April 22, 2007	Mount Lemmon	Mount Lemmon Survey	HNS	1.1 km	MPC · JPL
663392	2007 HR_{70}	—	April 11, 2007	Kitt Peak	Spacewatch	·	1.0 km	MPC · JPL
663393	2007 HZ_{79}	—	April 24, 2007	Mount Lemmon	Mount Lemmon Survey	EOS	1.5 km	MPC · JPL
663394	2007 HE_{82}	—	April 25, 2007	Kitt Peak	Spacewatch	·	1.7 km	MPC · JPL
663395	2007 HU_{82}	—	April 22, 2007	Catalina	CSS	·	770 m	MPC · JPL
663396	2007 HL_{92}	—	April 21, 2007	Cerro Tololo	Deep Ecliptic Survey	·	520 m	MPC · JPL
663397	2007 HR_{95}	—	April 22, 2007	Mount Lemmon	Mount Lemmon Survey	·	1.5 km	MPC · JPL
663398	2007 HY_{99}	—	April 19, 2007	Mount Lemmon	Mount Lemmon Survey	·	1.7 km	MPC · JPL
663399	2007 HO_{100}	—	April 26, 2007	Mount Lemmon	Mount Lemmon Survey	·	640 m	MPC · JPL
663400	2007 HA_{101}	—	April 25, 2007	Mount Lemmon	Mount Lemmon Survey	·	700 m	MPC · JPL

== 663401–663500 ==
back to top

Designation			Discovery			Properties		Ref
Permanent	Provisional	Named after	Date	Site	Discoverer(s)	Category	Diam.	Ref
663401	2007 HL_{101}	—	June 24, 2015	Haleakala	Pan-STARRS 1	·	3.0 km	MPC · JPL
663402	2007 HM_{101}	—	October 16, 2009	Mount Lemmon	Mount Lemmon Survey	·	1.8 km	MPC · JPL
663403	2007 HJ_{102}	—	April 24, 2007	Mount Lemmon	Mount Lemmon Survey	·	580 m	MPC · JPL
663404	2007 HB_{104}	—	August 19, 2012	Siding Spring	SSS	·	1.7 km	MPC · JPL
663405	2007 HJ_{107}	—	December 29, 2014	Mount Lemmon	Mount Lemmon Survey	·	1.3 km	MPC · JPL
663406	2007 HM_{108}	—	April 20, 2007	Mount Lemmon	Mount Lemmon Survey	T_{j} (2.96)	2.3 km	MPC · JPL
663407	2007 HS_{111}	—	April 25, 2007	Mount Lemmon	Mount Lemmon Survey	·	1.2 km	MPC · JPL
663408	2007 HZ_{111}	—	April 18, 2007	Mount Lemmon	Mount Lemmon Survey	·	640 m	MPC · JPL
663409	2007 HB_{112}	—	March 25, 2007	Mount Lemmon	Mount Lemmon Survey	·	1.6 km	MPC · JPL
663410	2007 HE_{112}	—	April 25, 2007	Kitt Peak	Spacewatch	·	1.2 km	MPC · JPL
663411	2007 HF_{112}	—	April 22, 2007	Kitt Peak	Spacewatch	HNS	920 m	MPC · JPL
663412	2007 HF_{115}	—	April 24, 2007	Kitt Peak	Spacewatch	·	3.6 km	MPC · JPL
663413	2007 JG_{8}	—	September 22, 2004	Kitt Peak	Spacewatch	·	1.1 km	MPC · JPL
663414	2007 JF_{11}	—	May 7, 2007	Kitt Peak	Spacewatch	·	1.6 km	MPC · JPL
663415	2007 JV_{14}	—	November 18, 1998	Kitt Peak	Spacewatch	·	780 m	MPC · JPL
663416	2007 JG_{15}	—	April 18, 2007	Kitt Peak	Spacewatch	·	3.7 km	MPC · JPL
663417	2007 JN_{15}	—	April 26, 2007	Kitt Peak	Spacewatch	·	680 m	MPC · JPL
663418	2007 JH_{20}	—	April 18, 2007	Kitt Peak	Spacewatch	·	2.6 km	MPC · JPL
663419	2007 JR_{23}	—	April 22, 2007	Catalina	CSS	·	2.0 km	MPC · JPL
663420	2007 JC_{24}	—	September 27, 2003	Apache Point	SDSS Collaboration	·	2.4 km	MPC · JPL
663421	2007 JA_{26}	—	May 9, 2007	Kitt Peak	Spacewatch	·	1.2 km	MPC · JPL
663422	2007 JJ_{30}	—	May 11, 2007	Mount Lemmon	Mount Lemmon Survey	AGN	1.1 km	MPC · JPL
663423	2007 JR_{33}	—	April 25, 2007	Mount Lemmon	Mount Lemmon Survey	H	360 m	MPC · JPL
663424	2007 JH_{37}	—	May 10, 2007	Kitt Peak	Spacewatch	·	3.0 km	MPC · JPL
663425	2007 JX_{38}	—	May 13, 2007	Mount Lemmon	Mount Lemmon Survey	·	1.6 km	MPC · JPL
663426	2007 JS_{43}	—	May 13, 2007	Mount Lemmon	Mount Lemmon Survey	EUN	1.1 km	MPC · JPL
663427	2007 JG_{46}	—	March 15, 2007	Mount Lemmon	Mount Lemmon Survey	·	1.2 km	MPC · JPL
663428	2007 JM_{46}	—	May 11, 2007	Mount Lemmon	Mount Lemmon Survey	·	1.6 km	MPC · JPL
663429	2007 JF_{47}	—	May 13, 2007	Mount Lemmon	Mount Lemmon Survey	T_{j} (2.98)	2.9 km	MPC · JPL
663430	2007 JN_{47}	—	April 23, 2014	Cerro Tololo	DECam	(2076)	620 m	MPC · JPL
663431	2007 JQ_{47}	—	January 3, 2016	Haleakala	Pan-STARRS 1	·	610 m	MPC · JPL
663432	2007 JT_{47}	—	February 20, 2012	Haleakala	Pan-STARRS 1	·	2.9 km	MPC · JPL
663433	2007 JU_{47}	—	April 26, 2007	Mount Lemmon	Mount Lemmon Survey	·	1.5 km	MPC · JPL
663434	2007 JF_{48}	—	November 8, 2010	Mount Lemmon	Mount Lemmon Survey	·	2.3 km	MPC · JPL
663435	2007 JN_{51}	—	May 10, 2007	Mount Lemmon	Mount Lemmon Survey	·	1.4 km	MPC · JPL
663436	2007 JD_{52}	—	May 10, 2007	Kitt Peak	Spacewatch	·	590 m	MPC · JPL
663437	2007 JS_{52}	—	May 9, 2007	Mount Lemmon	Mount Lemmon Survey	·	1.7 km	MPC · JPL
663438	2007 KX	—	March 14, 2012	Mount Lemmon	Mount Lemmon Survey	·	2.5 km	MPC · JPL
663439	2007 KW_{4}	—	May 10, 2007	Mount Lemmon	Mount Lemmon Survey	MAR	860 m	MPC · JPL
663440	2007 KL_{6}	—	May 25, 2007	Mount Lemmon	Mount Lemmon Survey	·	650 m	MPC · JPL
663441	2007 KC_{10}	—	October 1, 2009	Mount Lemmon	Mount Lemmon Survey	·	2.8 km	MPC · JPL
663442	2007 LY_{3}	—	October 13, 1999	Socorro	LINEAR	·	1.6 km	MPC · JPL
663443	2007 LD_{5}	—	June 11, 2007	Kitt Peak	Spacewatch	·	1.5 km	MPC · JPL
663444	2007 LQ_{6}	—	March 20, 2002	Kitt Peak	Deep Ecliptic Survey	·	1.4 km	MPC · JPL
663445	2007 LJ_{7}	—	May 12, 2007	XuYi	PMO NEO Survey Program	·	1.6 km	MPC · JPL
663446	2007 LV_{7}	—	August 19, 2003	Campo Imperatore	CINEOS	·	2.0 km	MPC · JPL
663447	2007 LQ_{9}	—	April 19, 2007	Mount Lemmon	Mount Lemmon Survey	·	2.7 km	MPC · JPL
663448	2007 LN_{14}	—	June 10, 2007	Kitt Peak	Spacewatch	·	2.1 km	MPC · JPL
663449	2007 LD_{15}	—	June 8, 2007	Reedy Creek	J. Broughton	·	1.7 km	MPC · JPL
663450	2007 LO_{23}	—	June 13, 2007	Kitt Peak	Spacewatch	·	880 m	MPC · JPL
663451	2007 LC_{33}	—	April 24, 2007	Mount Lemmon	Mount Lemmon Survey	EUN	900 m	MPC · JPL
663452	2007 LH_{36}	—	May 11, 2007	Kitt Peak	Spacewatch	GEF	1.1 km	MPC · JPL
663453	2007 LN_{38}	—	June 5, 2014	Haleakala	Pan-STARRS 1	(2076)	570 m	MPC · JPL
663454	2007 LA_{39}	—	November 20, 2008	Kitt Peak	Spacewatch	·	870 m	MPC · JPL
663455	2007 MD	—	June 16, 2007	Punaauia	N. Teamo, S. F. Hönig	·	2.0 km	MPC · JPL
663456	2007 ME_{2}	—	March 14, 2007	Mount Lemmon	Mount Lemmon Survey	·	1.7 km	MPC · JPL
663457	2007 MZ_{3}	—	January 23, 2006	Kitt Peak	Spacewatch	·	1.8 km	MPC · JPL
663458	2007 MK_{10}	—	June 21, 2007	Mount Lemmon	Mount Lemmon Survey	·	960 m	MPC · JPL
663459	2007 MD_{18}	—	June 21, 2007	Mount Lemmon	Mount Lemmon Survey	·	2.9 km	MPC · JPL
663460	2007 MC_{19}	—	June 21, 2007	Mount Lemmon	Mount Lemmon Survey	V	550 m	MPC · JPL
663461	2007 MD_{19}	—	June 21, 2007	Mount Lemmon	Mount Lemmon Survey	·	1.4 km	MPC · JPL
663462	2007 ML_{26}	—	August 4, 2003	Kitt Peak	Spacewatch	·	2.0 km	MPC · JPL
663463	2007 MK_{30}	—	June 16, 2007	Kitt Peak	Spacewatch	·	1.2 km	MPC · JPL
663464	2007 NE_{7}	—	May 3, 2003	Kitt Peak	Spacewatch	·	1.0 km	MPC · JPL
663465	2007 OU_{2}	—	July 20, 2007	Tiki	Teamo, N., S. F. Hönig	·	710 m	MPC · JPL
663466	2007 ON_{4}	—	July 20, 2007	Vallemare Borbona	V. S. Casulli	·	1.5 km	MPC · JPL
663467 Limeishu	2007 OT_{4}	Limeishu	July 21, 2007	Lulin	C.-S. Lin, Q. Ye	·	2.5 km	MPC · JPL
663468 Liaochichun	2007 OQ_{5}	Liaochichun	July 21, 2007	Lulin	C.-S. Lin, Q. Ye	·	1.4 km	MPC · JPL
663469	2007 OB_{11}	—	July 18, 2007	Mount Lemmon	Mount Lemmon Survey	·	610 m	MPC · JPL
663470	2007 OQ_{11}	—	July 16, 2007	Siding Spring	SSS	·	1.5 km	MPC · JPL
663471	2007 PP_{5}	—	August 25, 2003	Palomar	NEAT	MAR	1.2 km	MPC · JPL
663472	2007 PT_{25}	—	August 8, 2007	Socorro	LINEAR	·	1.9 km	MPC · JPL
663473	2007 PD_{28}	—	August 14, 2007	Bisei	BATTeRS	·	790 m	MPC · JPL
663474	2007 PJ_{28}	—	August 12, 2007	Socorro	LINEAR	·	1.2 km	MPC · JPL
663475	2007 PP_{28}	—	August 14, 2007	Vallemare Borbona	V. S. Casulli	EUN	1.1 km	MPC · JPL
663476	2007 PN_{31}	—	August 8, 2007	Socorro	LINEAR	·	1.4 km	MPC · JPL
663477	2007 PR_{32}	—	August 9, 2007	Dauban	C. Rinner, Kugel, F.	·	2.1 km	MPC · JPL
663478	2007 PM_{33}	—	August 6, 2007	Lulin	LUSS	ERI	1.1 km	MPC · JPL
663479	2007 PT_{39}	—	August 13, 2007	Socorro	LINEAR	·	860 m	MPC · JPL
663480	2007 PA_{44}	—	July 18, 2007	Mount Lemmon	Mount Lemmon Survey	·	2.2 km	MPC · JPL
663481	2007 PT_{49}	—	August 10, 2007	Kitt Peak	Spacewatch	·	930 m	MPC · JPL
663482	2007 PG_{54}	—	August 8, 2007	Dauban	C. Rinner, Kugel, F.	MAR	1.0 km	MPC · JPL
663483	2007 QB_{11}	—	August 23, 2007	Kitt Peak	Spacewatch	·	1.1 km	MPC · JPL
663484	2007 QF_{12}	—	August 31, 2007	Siding Spring	K. Sárneczky, L. Kiss	·	800 m	MPC · JPL
663485	2007 QC_{17}	—	August 21, 2007	Anderson Mesa	LONEOS	·	1.0 km	MPC · JPL
663486	2007 QV_{18}	—	August 23, 2007	Kitt Peak	Spacewatch	MAS	600 m	MPC · JPL
663487	2007 QO_{19}	—	August 24, 2007	Kitt Peak	Spacewatch	·	1.4 km	MPC · JPL
663488	2007 QY_{20}	—	August 23, 2007	Kitt Peak	Spacewatch	CLA	1.1 km	MPC · JPL
663489	2007 RT	—	August 24, 2007	Pla D'Arguines	R. Ferrando, Ferrando, M.	·	1.8 km	MPC · JPL
663490	2007 RF_{4}	—	February 4, 2005	Kitt Peak	Spacewatch	·	1.3 km	MPC · JPL
663491	2007 RT_{9}	—	September 10, 2007	Mount Lemmon	Mount Lemmon Survey	APO	550 m	MPC · JPL
663492	2007 RC_{11}	—	September 11, 2007	Mount Lemmon	Mount Lemmon Survey	·	1.7 km	MPC · JPL
663493	2007 RF_{27}	—	August 24, 2007	Kitt Peak	Spacewatch	·	1.0 km	MPC · JPL
663494	2007 RM_{27}	—	September 4, 2007	Mount Lemmon	Mount Lemmon Survey	·	1.2 km	MPC · JPL
663495	2007 RO_{29}	—	September 4, 2007	Catalina	CSS	(31811)	3.5 km	MPC · JPL
663496	2007 RD_{32}	—	September 5, 2007	Catalina	CSS	·	1.7 km	MPC · JPL
663497	2007 RJ_{34}	—	September 9, 2007	Kitt Peak	Spacewatch	·	1.6 km	MPC · JPL
663498	2007 RS_{40}	—	September 9, 2007	Kitt Peak	Spacewatch	NYS	850 m	MPC · JPL
663499	2007 RM_{44}	—	September 9, 2007	Kitt Peak	Spacewatch	·	1.5 km	MPC · JPL
663500	2007 RP_{46}	—	September 9, 2007	Kitt Peak	Spacewatch	·	1.4 km	MPC · JPL

== 663501–663600 ==
back to top

Designation			Discovery			Properties		Ref
Permanent	Provisional	Named after	Date	Site	Discoverer(s)	Category	Diam.	Ref
663501	2007 RF_{47}	—	September 9, 2007	Mount Lemmon	Mount Lemmon Survey	·	1.3 km	MPC · JPL
663502	2007 RG_{49}	—	September 9, 2007	Mount Lemmon	Mount Lemmon Survey	·	1.1 km	MPC · JPL
663503	2007 RQ_{51}	—	September 9, 2007	Kitt Peak	Spacewatch	·	1.2 km	MPC · JPL
663504	2007 RJ_{53}	—	September 9, 2007	Kitt Peak	Spacewatch	·	900 m	MPC · JPL
663505	2007 RG_{54}	—	September 9, 2007	Kitt Peak	Spacewatch	·	1.1 km	MPC · JPL
663506	2007 RC_{59}	—	July 22, 2007	Charleston	R. Holmes	·	1.4 km	MPC · JPL
663507	2007 RF_{62}	—	August 10, 2007	Kitt Peak	Spacewatch	·	920 m	MPC · JPL
663508	2007 RA_{72}	—	September 3, 2007	Catalina	CSS	·	730 m	MPC · JPL
663509	2007 RS_{72}	—	March 9, 2005	Kitt Peak	Spacewatch	·	890 m	MPC · JPL
663510	2007 RJ_{74}	—	September 10, 2007	Mount Lemmon	Mount Lemmon Survey	·	1.6 km	MPC · JPL
663511	2007 RY_{79}	—	September 10, 2007	Mount Lemmon	Mount Lemmon Survey	KOR	1.0 km	MPC · JPL
663512	2007 RD_{84}	—	November 15, 2003	Kitt Peak	Spacewatch	·	1.5 km	MPC · JPL
663513	2007 RK_{88}	—	September 10, 2007	Mount Lemmon	Mount Lemmon Survey	·	620 m	MPC · JPL
663514	2007 RW_{89}	—	March 13, 2005	Kitt Peak	Spacewatch	·	1.6 km	MPC · JPL
663515	2007 RV_{94}	—	March 25, 2006	Kitt Peak	Spacewatch	·	1.6 km	MPC · JPL
663516	2007 RF_{100}	—	September 11, 2007	Mount Lemmon	Mount Lemmon Survey	·	1.6 km	MPC · JPL
663517	2007 RV_{100}	—	December 3, 2003	Anderson Mesa	LONEOS	·	2.4 km	MPC · JPL
663518	2007 RK_{102}	—	August 10, 2007	Kitt Peak	Spacewatch	AGN	1 km	MPC · JPL
663519	2007 RQ_{103}	—	September 11, 2007	Catalina	CSS	DOR	2.1 km	MPC · JPL
663520	2007 RO_{105}	—	September 11, 2007	Catalina	CSS	·	930 m	MPC · JPL
663521	2007 RE_{107}	—	July 18, 2007	Mount Lemmon	Mount Lemmon Survey	·	1.1 km	MPC · JPL
663522	2007 RW_{108}	—	September 11, 2007	Kitt Peak	Spacewatch	·	1.8 km	MPC · JPL
663523	2007 RR_{110}	—	September 11, 2007	Mount Lemmon	Mount Lemmon Survey	·	1.7 km	MPC · JPL
663524	2007 RE_{111}	—	September 11, 2007	Kitt Peak	Spacewatch	V	490 m	MPC · JPL
663525	2007 RR_{113}	—	September 11, 2007	Kitt Peak	Spacewatch	·	950 m	MPC · JPL
663526	2007 RC_{118}	—	September 11, 2007	Kitt Peak	Spacewatch	·	980 m	MPC · JPL
663527	2007 RS_{120}	—	September 12, 2007	Mount Lemmon	Mount Lemmon Survey	·	1.6 km	MPC · JPL
663528	2007 RD_{123}	—	September 12, 2007	Mount Lemmon	Mount Lemmon Survey	L4	5.2 km	MPC · JPL
663529	2007 RN_{128}	—	September 12, 2007	Mount Lemmon	Mount Lemmon Survey	·	1.3 km	MPC · JPL
663530	2007 RA_{130}	—	September 12, 2007	Mount Lemmon	Mount Lemmon Survey	·	830 m	MPC · JPL
663531	2007 RT_{135}	—	September 8, 2007	Bergisch Gladbach	W. Bickel	·	2.0 km	MPC · JPL
663532	2007 RR_{145}	—	September 14, 2007	Socorro	LINEAR	·	1.4 km	MPC · JPL
663533	2007 RT_{151}	—	September 10, 2007	Kitt Peak	Spacewatch	(194)	1.6 km	MPC · JPL
663534	2007 RO_{156}	—	September 10, 2007	Mount Lemmon	Mount Lemmon Survey	KOR	950 m	MPC · JPL
663535	2007 RQ_{160}	—	September 12, 2007	Mount Lemmon	Mount Lemmon Survey	·	1.0 km	MPC · JPL
663536	2007 RE_{168}	—	November 16, 2003	Kitt Peak	Spacewatch	·	1.6 km	MPC · JPL
663537	2007 RF_{170}	—	August 10, 2007	Kitt Peak	Spacewatch	·	1.7 km	MPC · JPL
663538	2007 RF_{173}	—	September 10, 2007	Kitt Peak	Spacewatch	·	740 m	MPC · JPL
663539	2007 RV_{175}	—	September 12, 2007	Bisei	BATTeRS	·	580 m	MPC · JPL
663540	2007 RS_{177}	—	September 10, 2007	Mount Lemmon	Mount Lemmon Survey	·	1.5 km	MPC · JPL
663541	2007 RT_{181}	—	July 5, 2003	Kitt Peak	Spacewatch	MAS	630 m	MPC · JPL
663542	2007 RF_{182}	—	August 10, 2007	Kitt Peak	Spacewatch	·	940 m	MPC · JPL
663543	2007 RS_{182}	—	September 12, 2007	Kitt Peak	Spacewatch	·	1.1 km	MPC · JPL
663544	2007 RA_{183}	—	September 12, 2007	Mount Lemmon	Mount Lemmon Survey	KOR	900 m	MPC · JPL
663545	2007 RU_{185}	—	March 24, 2006	Kitt Peak	Spacewatch	·	1.6 km	MPC · JPL
663546	2007 RW_{186}	—	September 13, 2007	Mount Lemmon	Mount Lemmon Survey	·	2.0 km	MPC · JPL
663547	2007 RO_{187}	—	September 13, 2007	Mount Lemmon	Mount Lemmon Survey	·	2.1 km	MPC · JPL
663548	2007 RH_{188}	—	September 10, 2007	Catalina	CSS	·	700 m	MPC · JPL
663549	2007 RD_{210}	—	September 10, 2007	Kitt Peak	Spacewatch	·	690 m	MPC · JPL
663550	2007 RG_{220}	—	March 13, 2005	Kitt Peak	Spacewatch	·	1.5 km	MPC · JPL
663551	2007 RH_{229}	—	February 12, 2000	Apache Point	SDSS	·	2.4 km	MPC · JPL
663552	2007 RP_{231}	—	September 11, 2007	Mount Lemmon	Mount Lemmon Survey	NYS	790 m	MPC · JPL
663553	2007 RV_{245}	—	February 24, 2006	Kitt Peak	Spacewatch	V	590 m	MPC · JPL
663554	2007 RS_{248}	—	February 16, 2004	Kitt Peak	Spacewatch	·	2.8 km	MPC · JPL
663555	2007 RN_{254}	—	September 14, 2007	Mount Lemmon	Mount Lemmon Survey	·	1.6 km	MPC · JPL
663556	2007 RQ_{257}	—	September 14, 2007	Mount Lemmon	Mount Lemmon Survey	·	1.9 km	MPC · JPL
663557	2007 RX_{266}	—	May 25, 2006	Kitt Peak	Spacewatch	·	1.5 km	MPC · JPL
663558	2007 RA_{279}	—	September 5, 2007	Siding Spring	SSS	·	1.6 km	MPC · JPL
663559	2007 RD_{302}	—	September 15, 2007	Lulin	LUSS	·	1.4 km	MPC · JPL
663560	2007 RE_{314}	—	September 14, 2007	Catalina	CSS	LIX	3.6 km	MPC · JPL
663561	2007 RQ_{315}	—	September 12, 2007	Anderson Mesa	LONEOS	MAS	640 m	MPC · JPL
663562	2007 RS_{319}	—	September 13, 2007	Catalina	CSS	·	1.1 km	MPC · JPL
663563	2007 RS_{321}	—	September 15, 2007	Kitt Peak	Spacewatch	·	1.0 km	MPC · JPL
663564	2007 RF_{322}	—	September 11, 2007	Kitt Peak	Spacewatch	MAS	560 m	MPC · JPL
663565	2007 RS_{323}	—	September 10, 2007	Kitt Peak	Spacewatch	·	1.7 km	MPC · JPL
663566	2007 RP_{327}	—	September 9, 2007	Mount Lemmon	Mount Lemmon Survey	·	910 m	MPC · JPL
663567	2007 RW_{329}	—	September 10, 2007	Mount Lemmon	Mount Lemmon Survey	·	620 m	MPC · JPL
663568	2007 RL_{330}	—	September 11, 2007	Mount Lemmon	Mount Lemmon Survey	·	1.4 km	MPC · JPL
663569	2007 RA_{332}	—	September 13, 2007	Mount Lemmon	Mount Lemmon Survey	·	710 m	MPC · JPL
663570	2007 RX_{332}	—	September 15, 2007	Mount Lemmon	Mount Lemmon Survey	·	630 m	MPC · JPL
663571	2007 RA_{333}	—	September 11, 2007	Mount Lemmon	Mount Lemmon Survey	AGN	1.0 km	MPC · JPL
663572	2007 RJ_{334}	—	September 13, 2007	Mount Lemmon	Mount Lemmon Survey	DOR	1.8 km	MPC · JPL
663573	2007 RA_{335}	—	September 12, 2007	Catalina	CSS	·	570 m	MPC · JPL
663574	2007 RA_{336}	—	September 12, 2007	Mount Lemmon	Mount Lemmon Survey	·	1.6 km	MPC · JPL
663575	2007 RO_{336}	—	October 30, 2011	ESA OGS	ESA OGS	·	780 m	MPC · JPL
663576	2007 RD_{337}	—	September 12, 2007	Catalina	CSS	·	740 m	MPC · JPL
663577	2007 RK_{342}	—	August 26, 2012	Haleakala	Pan-STARRS 1	KOR	1.2 km	MPC · JPL
663578	2007 RO_{345}	—	September 5, 2007	Catalina	CSS	PHO	750 m	MPC · JPL
663579	2007 RA_{346}	—	September 11, 2007	Mount Lemmon	Mount Lemmon Survey	·	1.6 km	MPC · JPL
663580	2007 RB_{350}	—	October 7, 2012	Haleakala	Pan-STARRS 1	HOF	2.2 km	MPC · JPL
663581	2007 RB_{352}	—	April 23, 2015	Haleakala	Pan-STARRS 1	·	1.4 km	MPC · JPL
663582	2007 RR_{352}	—	March 17, 2015	Haleakala	Pan-STARRS 1	·	1.3 km	MPC · JPL
663583	2007 RS_{352}	—	September 9, 2008	Kitt Peak	Spacewatch	L4	6.0 km	MPC · JPL
663584	2007 RM_{353}	—	September 4, 2007	Mount Lemmon	Mount Lemmon Survey	·	1.0 km	MPC · JPL
663585	2007 RA_{355}	—	September 4, 2007	Catalina	CSS	·	1.3 km	MPC · JPL
663586	2007 RL_{356}	—	September 13, 2007	Mount Lemmon	Mount Lemmon Survey	·	1.5 km	MPC · JPL
663587	2007 RT_{356}	—	September 15, 2007	Mount Lemmon	Mount Lemmon Survey	·	860 m	MPC · JPL
663588	2007 RA_{357}	—	September 13, 2007	Mount Lemmon	Mount Lemmon Survey	KOR	930 m	MPC · JPL
663589	2007 RL_{361}	—	September 13, 2007	Mount Lemmon	Mount Lemmon Survey	MRX	910 m	MPC · JPL
663590	2007 RS_{363}	—	September 15, 2007	Mount Lemmon	Mount Lemmon Survey	NYS	940 m	MPC · JPL
663591	2007 RS_{369}	—	September 10, 2007	Kitt Peak	Spacewatch	·	1.6 km	MPC · JPL
663592	2007 RZ_{369}	—	September 14, 2007	Mount Lemmon	Mount Lemmon Survey	·	1.5 km	MPC · JPL
663593	2007 RQ_{370}	—	September 14, 2007	Mount Lemmon	Mount Lemmon Survey	·	1.6 km	MPC · JPL
663594	2007 RV_{371}	—	September 13, 2007	Kitt Peak	Spacewatch	TIN	730 m	MPC · JPL
663595	2007 RN_{372}	—	September 13, 2007	Mount Lemmon	Mount Lemmon Survey	·	1.5 km	MPC · JPL
663596	2007 RR_{372}	—	September 12, 2007	Mount Lemmon	Mount Lemmon Survey	·	1.5 km	MPC · JPL
663597	2007 SJ_{2}	—	September 12, 2007	Anderson Mesa	LONEOS	·	530 m	MPC · JPL
663598	2007 SV_{4}	—	September 13, 2007	Catalina	CSS	·	620 m	MPC · JPL
663599	2007 SP_{13}	—	September 19, 2007	Kitt Peak	Spacewatch	·	1.5 km	MPC · JPL
663600	2007 SD_{16}	—	September 7, 2007	La Cañada	Lacruz, J.	NYS	940 m	MPC · JPL

== 663601–663700 ==
back to top

Designation			Discovery			Properties		Ref
Permanent	Provisional	Named after	Date	Site	Discoverer(s)	Category	Diam.	Ref
663601	2007 SX_{21}	—	September 20, 2007	Kitt Peak	Spacewatch	NYS	1.1 km	MPC · JPL
663602	2007 SR_{25}	—	August 3, 2016	Haleakala	Pan-STARRS 1	·	1.6 km	MPC · JPL
663603	2007 SB_{27}	—	March 24, 2009	Mount Lemmon	Mount Lemmon Survey	H	450 m	MPC · JPL
663604	2007 SM_{27}	—	April 6, 2010	Mount Lemmon	Mount Lemmon Survey	AGN	960 m	MPC · JPL
663605	2007 TK	—	September 12, 2007	Kitt Peak	Spacewatch	·	900 m	MPC · JPL
663606	2007 TX_{3}	—	October 5, 2007	Pla D'Arguines	R. Ferrando, Ferrando, M.	·	1.5 km	MPC · JPL
663607	2007 TQ_{11}	—	September 15, 2007	Lulin	LUSS	·	1.1 km	MPC · JPL
663608	2007 TR_{19}	—	October 7, 2007	Črni Vrh	Skvarč, J.	·	3.2 km	MPC · JPL
663609	2007 TU_{19}	—	September 11, 2007	Mount Lemmon	Mount Lemmon Survey	·	1.1 km	MPC · JPL
663610	2007 TY_{23}	—	October 11, 2007	Catalina	CSS	JUN	1.2 km	MPC · JPL
663611	2007 TA_{27}	—	October 4, 2007	Kitt Peak	Spacewatch	·	580 m	MPC · JPL
663612	2007 TJ_{30}	—	October 4, 2007	Kitt Peak	Spacewatch	DOR	1.8 km	MPC · JPL
663613	2007 TX_{32}	—	September 8, 2007	Mount Lemmon	Mount Lemmon Survey	PHO	750 m	MPC · JPL
663614	2007 TP_{38}	—	October 5, 2007	Kitt Peak	Spacewatch	·	890 m	MPC · JPL
663615	2007 TQ_{48}	—	November 1, 1997	Kitt Peak	Spacewatch	·	1.2 km	MPC · JPL
663616	2007 TY_{48}	—	October 4, 2007	Kitt Peak	Spacewatch	·	960 m	MPC · JPL
663617	2007 TD_{50}	—	September 5, 2007	Mount Lemmon	Mount Lemmon Survey	·	560 m	MPC · JPL
663618	2007 TE_{53}	—	October 4, 2007	Kitt Peak	Spacewatch	JUN	850 m	MPC · JPL
663619	2007 TG_{58}	—	October 4, 2007	Kitt Peak	Spacewatch	·	690 m	MPC · JPL
663620	2007 TE_{70}	—	September 14, 2007	Mount Lemmon	Mount Lemmon Survey	·	690 m	MPC · JPL
663621	2007 TD_{72}	—	September 10, 2007	Mount Lemmon	Mount Lemmon Survey	MAS	670 m	MPC · JPL
663622	2007 TR_{81}	—	September 15, 2007	Mount Lemmon	Mount Lemmon Survey	·	1.5 km	MPC · JPL
663623	2007 TZ_{83}	—	September 12, 2007	Catalina	CSS	·	1.6 km	MPC · JPL
663624	2007 TD_{86}	—	October 8, 2007	Mount Lemmon	Mount Lemmon Survey	·	550 m	MPC · JPL
663625	2007 TL_{91}	—	September 10, 2007	Catalina	CSS	·	580 m	MPC · JPL
663626	2007 TC_{93}	—	November 15, 1998	Kitt Peak	Spacewatch	AGN	1.3 km	MPC · JPL
663627	2007 TS_{94}	—	October 6, 2007	7300	W. K. Y. Yeung	NYS	900 m	MPC · JPL
663628	2007 TM_{96}	—	September 9, 2007	Mount Lemmon	Mount Lemmon Survey	·	1.4 km	MPC · JPL
663629	2007 TW_{104}	—	September 15, 2007	Mount Lemmon	Mount Lemmon Survey	NYS	830 m	MPC · JPL
663630	2007 TX_{109}	—	October 7, 2007	Catalina	CSS	·	1.2 km	MPC · JPL
663631	2007 TF_{133}	—	October 7, 2007	Mount Lemmon	Mount Lemmon Survey	KOR	1.2 km	MPC · JPL
663632	2007 TP_{133}	—	October 7, 2007	Mount Lemmon	Mount Lemmon Survey	·	500 m	MPC · JPL
663633	2007 TC_{137}	—	October 8, 2007	Kitt Peak	Spacewatch	MAS	510 m	MPC · JPL
663634	2007 TN_{142}	—	October 13, 2007	Catalina	CSS	THB	2.8 km	MPC · JPL
663635	2007 TO_{142}	—	September 13, 2007	Mount Lemmon	Mount Lemmon Survey	T_{j} (2.98) · 3:2	3.7 km	MPC · JPL
663636	2007 TZ_{148}	—	September 20, 2007	Catalina	CSS	·	890 m	MPC · JPL
663637	2007 TL_{154}	—	October 9, 2007	Anderson Mesa	LONEOS	·	1.3 km	MPC · JPL
663638	2007 TH_{162}	—	September 12, 2007	Mount Lemmon	Mount Lemmon Survey	·	980 m	MPC · JPL
663639	2007 TP_{162}	—	October 13, 2007	Catalina	CSS	·	1.0 km	MPC · JPL
663640	2007 TM_{175}	—	October 4, 2007	Kitt Peak	Spacewatch	·	560 m	MPC · JPL
663641	2007 TY_{176}	—	September 8, 2007	Mount Lemmon	Mount Lemmon Survey	·	530 m	MPC · JPL
663642	2007 TY_{187}	—	October 19, 2007	Mount Lemmon	Mount Lemmon Survey	·	760 m	MPC · JPL
663643	2007 TQ_{190}	—	July 18, 2007	Mount Lemmon	Mount Lemmon Survey	·	880 m	MPC · JPL
663644	2007 TO_{191}	—	September 11, 2007	Mount Lemmon	Mount Lemmon Survey	·	670 m	MPC · JPL
663645	2007 TT_{193}	—	September 17, 2007	Andrushivka	Y. Ivaščenko	·	1.5 km	MPC · JPL
663646	2007 TG_{195}	—	October 7, 2007	Mount Lemmon	Mount Lemmon Survey	·	800 m	MPC · JPL
663647	2007 TR_{195}	—	September 12, 2007	Mount Lemmon	Mount Lemmon Survey	·	1.8 km	MPC · JPL
663648	2007 TH_{203}	—	October 8, 2007	Mount Lemmon	Mount Lemmon Survey	·	700 m	MPC · JPL
663649	2007 TK_{206}	—	August 10, 2007	Kitt Peak	Spacewatch	·	620 m	MPC · JPL
663650	2007 TH_{209}	—	October 19, 2003	Palomar	NEAT	·	1.3 km	MPC · JPL
663651	2007 TU_{209}	—	October 11, 2007	Mount Lemmon	Mount Lemmon Survey	·	1.4 km	MPC · JPL
663652	2007 TJ_{211}	—	October 7, 2007	Kitt Peak	Spacewatch	·	620 m	MPC · JPL
663653	2007 TW_{217}	—	October 7, 2007	Kitt Peak	Spacewatch	·	1.7 km	MPC · JPL
663654	2007 TT_{222}	—	October 9, 2007	Kitt Peak	Spacewatch	H	340 m	MPC · JPL
663655	2007 TZ_{225}	—	October 8, 2007	Kitt Peak	Spacewatch	·	1.4 km	MPC · JPL
663656	2007 TM_{233}	—	October 8, 2007	Kitt Peak	Spacewatch	·	1.6 km	MPC · JPL
663657	2007 TE_{237}	—	October 9, 2007	Mount Lemmon	Mount Lemmon Survey	NEM	2.2 km	MPC · JPL
663658	2007 TW_{239}	—	September 9, 2007	Mount Lemmon	Mount Lemmon Survey	KOR	1.1 km	MPC · JPL
663659	2007 TN_{241}	—	October 7, 2007	Mount Lemmon	Mount Lemmon Survey	·	1.6 km	MPC · JPL
663660	2007 TB_{247}	—	October 12, 2007	Catalina	CSS	·	1.2 km	MPC · JPL
663661	2007 TC_{251}	—	October 11, 2007	Mount Lemmon	Mount Lemmon Survey	·	970 m	MPC · JPL
663662	2007 TZ_{254}	—	October 9, 2007	Kitt Peak	Spacewatch	·	690 m	MPC · JPL
663663	2007 TL_{255}	—	October 10, 2007	Kitt Peak	Spacewatch	·	1.2 km	MPC · JPL
663664	2007 TB_{258}	—	May 8, 2006	Kitt Peak	Spacewatch	·	1.1 km	MPC · JPL
663665	2007 TN_{272}	—	October 9, 2007	Kitt Peak	Spacewatch	NYS	1.1 km	MPC · JPL
663666	2007 TM_{277}	—	October 11, 2007	Mount Lemmon	Mount Lemmon Survey	·	2.7 km	MPC · JPL
663667	2007 TH_{278}	—	October 4, 2007	Kitt Peak	Spacewatch	NYS	820 m	MPC · JPL
663668	2007 TD_{284}	—	September 10, 2007	Mount Lemmon	Mount Lemmon Survey	·	650 m	MPC · JPL
663669	2007 TF_{286}	—	October 9, 2007	Mount Lemmon	Mount Lemmon Survey	·	3.5 km	MPC · JPL
663670	2007 TD_{289}	—	October 11, 2007	Catalina	CSS	·	860 m	MPC · JPL
663671	2007 TV_{289}	—	November 30, 2003	Kitt Peak	Spacewatch	·	1.4 km	MPC · JPL
663672	2007 TZ_{289}	—	September 12, 2007	Mount Lemmon	Mount Lemmon Survey	·	1.1 km	MPC · JPL
663673	2007 TT_{291}	—	January 16, 2005	Mauna Kea	Veillet, C.	NYS	1.1 km	MPC · JPL
663674	2007 TE_{296}	—	October 10, 2007	Mount Lemmon	Mount Lemmon Survey	·	750 m	MPC · JPL
663675	2007 TT_{300}	—	October 4, 2007	Kitt Peak	Spacewatch	AGN	1.1 km	MPC · JPL
663676	2007 TF_{305}	—	October 12, 2007	Socorro	LINEAR	H	440 m	MPC · JPL
663677	2007 TV_{308}	—	October 10, 2007	Kitt Peak	Spacewatch	MRX	1.2 km	MPC · JPL
663678	2007 TK_{319}	—	October 12, 2007	Kitt Peak	Spacewatch	MAS	730 m	MPC · JPL
663679	2007 TE_{325}	—	October 11, 2007	Kitt Peak	Spacewatch	·	980 m	MPC · JPL
663680	2007 TH_{326}	—	September 25, 2007	Mount Lemmon	Mount Lemmon Survey	·	1.9 km	MPC · JPL
663681	2007 TO_{331}	—	October 11, 2007	Kitt Peak	Spacewatch	·	1.1 km	MPC · JPL
663682	2007 TA_{337}	—	October 12, 2007	Catalina	CSS	·	1.3 km	MPC · JPL
663683	2007 TB_{338}	—	October 13, 2007	Catalina	CSS	·	1.7 km	MPC · JPL
663684	2007 TE_{346}	—	September 10, 2007	Kitt Peak	Spacewatch	·	960 m	MPC · JPL
663685	2007 TG_{346}	—	September 18, 2007	Kitt Peak	Spacewatch	NYS	1.0 km	MPC · JPL
663686	2007 TO_{346}	—	September 15, 2007	Mount Lemmon	Mount Lemmon Survey	·	1.5 km	MPC · JPL
663687	2007 TY_{347}	—	October 15, 2007	Mount Lemmon	Mount Lemmon Survey	(5)	1.2 km	MPC · JPL
663688	2007 TH_{349}	—	January 31, 2006	Kitt Peak	Spacewatch	NYS	970 m	MPC · JPL
663689	2007 TZ_{354}	—	September 11, 2007	Mount Lemmon	Mount Lemmon Survey	·	580 m	MPC · JPL
663690	2007 TG_{355}	—	September 12, 2007	Catalina	CSS	CLO	2.5 km	MPC · JPL
663691	2007 TR_{364}	—	October 15, 2007	Mount Lemmon	Mount Lemmon Survey	·	1.1 km	MPC · JPL
663692	2007 TZ_{371}	—	September 10, 2007	Kitt Peak	Spacewatch	·	1.8 km	MPC · JPL
663693	2007 TS_{378}	—	October 12, 2007	Mount Lemmon	Mount Lemmon Survey	·	1.3 km	MPC · JPL
663694	2007 TW_{382}	—	October 14, 2007	Kitt Peak	Spacewatch	·	1.2 km	MPC · JPL
663695	2007 TV_{383}	—	September 28, 2003	Apache Point	SDSS Collaboration	·	1.3 km	MPC · JPL
663696	2007 TT_{387}	—	October 13, 2007	Kitt Peak	Spacewatch	·	1.5 km	MPC · JPL
663697	2007 TX_{387}	—	October 13, 2007	Kitt Peak	Spacewatch	·	1.1 km	MPC · JPL
663698	2007 TB_{392}	—	September 12, 2007	Mount Lemmon	Mount Lemmon Survey	·	940 m	MPC · JPL
663699	2007 TJ_{394}	—	July 25, 2003	Campo Imperatore	CINEOS	·	1.1 km	MPC · JPL
663700	2007 TQ_{396}	—	October 15, 2007	Kitt Peak	Spacewatch	(5)	930 m	MPC · JPL

== 663701–663800 ==
back to top

Designation			Discovery			Properties		Ref
Permanent	Provisional	Named after	Date	Site	Discoverer(s)	Category	Diam.	Ref
663701	2007 TN_{397}	—	March 11, 2005	Mount Lemmon	Mount Lemmon Survey	·	1.7 km	MPC · JPL
663702	2007 TG_{401}	—	October 15, 2007	Mount Lemmon	Mount Lemmon Survey	·	1.7 km	MPC · JPL
663703	2007 TK_{402}	—	October 15, 2007	Mount Lemmon	Mount Lemmon Survey	·	2.7 km	MPC · JPL
663704	2007 TW_{406}	—	October 15, 2007	Mount Lemmon	Mount Lemmon Survey	NAE	1.8 km	MPC · JPL
663705	2007 TB_{409}	—	October 15, 2007	Mount Lemmon	Mount Lemmon Survey	·	1.7 km	MPC · JPL
663706	2007 TA_{414}	—	October 15, 2007	Catalina	CSS	EUN	1.2 km	MPC · JPL
663707	2007 TL_{417}	—	October 7, 2007	Mount Lemmon	Mount Lemmon Survey	KOR	1.0 km	MPC · JPL
663708	2007 TZ_{419}	—	October 8, 2007	Catalina	CSS	·	1.2 km	MPC · JPL
663709	2007 TU_{421}	—	October 12, 2007	Catalina	CSS	PHO	810 m	MPC · JPL
663710	2007 TW_{422}	—	October 12, 2007	Kitt Peak	Spacewatch	·	2.0 km	MPC · JPL
663711	2007 TK_{423}	—	October 4, 2007	Kitt Peak	Spacewatch	·	570 m	MPC · JPL
663712	2007 TX_{425}	—	October 8, 2007	Mount Lemmon	Mount Lemmon Survey	·	660 m	MPC · JPL
663713	2007 TV_{429}	—	October 13, 2007	Goodricke-Pigott	R. A. Tucker	·	1.2 km	MPC · JPL
663714	2007 TP_{431}	—	October 15, 2007	Kitt Peak	Spacewatch	·	1.8 km	MPC · JPL
663715	2007 TJ_{432}	—	October 4, 2007	Kitt Peak	Spacewatch	·	1.5 km	MPC · JPL
663716	2007 TS_{434}	—	October 11, 2007	Mount Lemmon	Mount Lemmon Survey	·	740 m	MPC · JPL
663717	2007 TJ_{441}	—	September 21, 2003	Palomar	NEAT	·	1.1 km	MPC · JPL
663718	2007 TO_{446}	—	October 9, 2007	Kitt Peak	Spacewatch	·	1.9 km	MPC · JPL
663719	2007 TK_{450}	—	October 11, 2007	Kitt Peak	Spacewatch	·	1.8 km	MPC · JPL
663720	2007 TU_{459}	—	October 9, 2007	Kitt Peak	Spacewatch	·	1.8 km	MPC · JPL
663721	2007 TF_{460}	—	October 10, 2007	Kitt Peak	Spacewatch	KOR	1.2 km	MPC · JPL
663722	2007 TM_{461}	—	May 10, 2015	Mount Lemmon	Mount Lemmon Survey	·	2.1 km	MPC · JPL
663723	2007 TC_{462}	—	July 31, 2014	Haleakala	Pan-STARRS 1	·	880 m	MPC · JPL
663724	2007 TE_{463}	—	September 6, 2014	Mount Lemmon	Mount Lemmon Survey	·	790 m	MPC · JPL
663725	2007 TX_{465}	—	October 13, 2007	Catalina	CSS	V	610 m	MPC · JPL
663726	2007 TU_{467}	—	October 22, 2012	Haleakala	Pan-STARRS 1	·	1.8 km	MPC · JPL
663727	2007 TS_{469}	—	October 9, 2007	Mount Lemmon	Mount Lemmon Survey	·	1.7 km	MPC · JPL
663728	2007 TS_{470}	—	October 9, 2007	Mount Lemmon	Mount Lemmon Survey	KOR	1.2 km	MPC · JPL
663729	2007 TP_{478}	—	October 8, 2012	Kitt Peak	Spacewatch	·	1.5 km	MPC · JPL
663730	2007 TY_{480}	—	October 8, 2007	Mount Lemmon	Mount Lemmon Survey	AGN	1.1 km	MPC · JPL
663731	2007 TG_{481}	—	October 10, 2007	Mount Lemmon	Mount Lemmon Survey	HOF	2.0 km	MPC · JPL
663732	2007 TN_{484}	—	October 8, 2007	Mount Lemmon	Mount Lemmon Survey	·	1.5 km	MPC · JPL
663733	2007 TZ_{496}	—	October 12, 2007	Kitt Peak	Spacewatch	·	780 m	MPC · JPL
663734	2007 TM_{499}	—	October 4, 2007	Mount Lemmon	Mount Lemmon Survey	·	1.5 km	MPC · JPL
663735	2007 TY_{499}	—	October 15, 2007	Mount Lemmon	Mount Lemmon Survey	·	1.8 km	MPC · JPL
663736	2007 TH_{500}	—	October 10, 2007	Mount Lemmon	Mount Lemmon Survey	AGN	1.0 km	MPC · JPL
663737	2007 TL_{503}	—	October 10, 2007	Mount Lemmon	Mount Lemmon Survey	·	1.4 km	MPC · JPL
663738	2007 TA_{505}	—	October 9, 2007	Mount Lemmon	Mount Lemmon Survey	KOR	950 m	MPC · JPL
663739	2007 TW_{506}	—	October 8, 2007	Mount Lemmon	Mount Lemmon Survey	TRE	1.7 km	MPC · JPL
663740	2007 UM_{5}	—	October 11, 2007	Kitt Peak	Spacewatch	NYS	1.2 km	MPC · JPL
663741	2007 UD_{19}	—	October 18, 2007	Mount Lemmon	Mount Lemmon Survey	NYS	730 m	MPC · JPL
663742	2007 UX_{24}	—	October 8, 2007	Kitt Peak	Spacewatch	NYS	960 m	MPC · JPL
663743	2007 UC_{32}	—	October 19, 2007	Mount Lemmon	Mount Lemmon Survey	·	2.2 km	MPC · JPL
663744	2007 UX_{33}	—	July 25, 2003	Palomar	NEAT	·	1.4 km	MPC · JPL
663745	2007 UZ_{39}	—	October 20, 2007	Mount Lemmon	Mount Lemmon Survey	·	1.6 km	MPC · JPL
663746	2007 UV_{40}	—	October 4, 2007	Kitt Peak	Spacewatch	MAS	710 m	MPC · JPL
663747	2007 UT_{45}	—	October 19, 2007	Kitt Peak	Spacewatch	·	1.0 km	MPC · JPL
663748	2007 UG_{47}	—	October 11, 2007	Kitt Peak	Spacewatch	·	1.9 km	MPC · JPL
663749	2007 UH_{53}	—	October 7, 2007	Mount Lemmon	Mount Lemmon Survey	·	890 m	MPC · JPL
663750	2007 UW_{54}	—	October 30, 2007	Kitt Peak	Spacewatch	·	790 m	MPC · JPL
663751	2007 UT_{57}	—	October 30, 2007	Mount Lemmon	Mount Lemmon Survey	·	2.1 km	MPC · JPL
663752	2007 UG_{72}	—	April 10, 2005	Mount Lemmon	Mount Lemmon Survey	·	1.8 km	MPC · JPL
663753	2007 UQ_{74}	—	October 8, 2007	Kitt Peak	Spacewatch	·	730 m	MPC · JPL
663754	2007 UW_{74}	—	October 31, 2007	Mount Lemmon	Mount Lemmon Survey	·	1.3 km	MPC · JPL
663755	2007 UF_{75}	—	October 31, 2007	Mount Lemmon	Mount Lemmon Survey	·	1.3 km	MPC · JPL
663756	2007 UK_{76}	—	October 31, 2007	Mount Lemmon	Mount Lemmon Survey	·	2.0 km	MPC · JPL
663757	2007 UK_{80}	—	March 12, 2005	Kitt Peak	Spacewatch	·	1.4 km	MPC · JPL
663758	2007 UK_{83}	—	September 14, 2007	Mount Lemmon	Mount Lemmon Survey	·	1.6 km	MPC · JPL
663759	2007 UA_{103}	—	October 30, 2007	Mount Lemmon	Mount Lemmon Survey	·	2.0 km	MPC · JPL
663760	2007 UO_{106}	—	October 31, 2007	Mount Lemmon	Mount Lemmon Survey	NYS	840 m	MPC · JPL
663761	2007 UB_{119}	—	September 20, 2007	Kitt Peak	Spacewatch	·	1.5 km	MPC · JPL
663762	2007 US_{119}	—	October 7, 2007	Mount Lemmon	Mount Lemmon Survey	KOR	1.1 km	MPC · JPL
663763	2007 UB_{120}	—	October 12, 2007	Mount Lemmon	Mount Lemmon Survey	H	340 m	MPC · JPL
663764	2007 UE_{120}	—	October 30, 2007	Mount Lemmon	Mount Lemmon Survey	·	1.2 km	MPC · JPL
663765	2007 UZ_{123}	—	October 11, 2007	Lulin	LUSS	·	1.8 km	MPC · JPL
663766	2007 UA_{136}	—	October 24, 2007	Mount Lemmon	Mount Lemmon Survey	·	2.7 km	MPC · JPL
663767	2007 UD_{138}	—	October 19, 2007	Catalina	CSS	·	2.0 km	MPC · JPL
663768	2007 UZ_{145}	—	January 31, 2009	Mount Lemmon	Mount Lemmon Survey	·	1.9 km	MPC · JPL
663769	2007 UB_{146}	—	October 20, 2007	Mount Lemmon	Mount Lemmon Survey	·	1.5 km	MPC · JPL
663770	2007 UZ_{151}	—	December 28, 2013	Kitt Peak	Spacewatch	·	1.9 km	MPC · JPL
663771	2007 UG_{153}	—	October 21, 2007	Mount Lemmon	Mount Lemmon Survey	·	1.7 km	MPC · JPL
663772	2007 UE_{155}	—	October 18, 2007	Kitt Peak	Spacewatch	·	1.7 km	MPC · JPL
663773	2007 UM_{155}	—	October 30, 2007	Mount Lemmon	Mount Lemmon Survey	KOR	1.1 km	MPC · JPL
663774	2007 UV_{155}	—	October 20, 2007	Mount Lemmon	Mount Lemmon Survey	V	510 m	MPC · JPL
663775	2007 UJ_{156}	—	October 30, 2007	Kitt Peak	Spacewatch	KOR	1.2 km	MPC · JPL
663776	2007 UF_{164}	—	October 18, 2007	Mount Lemmon	Mount Lemmon Survey	·	1.6 km	MPC · JPL
663777	2007 VW_{5}	—	October 10, 2007	Anderson Mesa	LONEOS	·	2.0 km	MPC · JPL
663778	2007 VZ_{5}	—	November 2, 2007	Črni Vrh	Matičič, S.	(5)	2.4 km	MPC · JPL
663779	2007 VC_{7}	—	October 9, 2007	Kitt Peak	Spacewatch	·	890 m	MPC · JPL
663780	2007 VN_{7}	—	November 2, 2007	Eskridge	G. Hug	·	590 m	MPC · JPL
663781	2007 VY_{14}	—	November 1, 2007	Kitt Peak	Spacewatch	·	1.1 km	MPC · JPL
663782	2007 VN_{32}	—	July 21, 2002	Palomar	NEAT	·	1.7 km	MPC · JPL
663783	2007 VM_{37}	—	April 12, 2005	Kitt Peak	Deep Ecliptic Survey	KOR	1.1 km	MPC · JPL
663784	2007 VF_{39}	—	October 12, 2007	Mount Lemmon	Mount Lemmon Survey	·	2.0 km	MPC · JPL
663785	2007 VN_{43}	—	November 1, 2007	Kitt Peak	Spacewatch	·	2.2 km	MPC · JPL
663786	2007 VM_{45}	—	November 1, 2007	Kitt Peak	Spacewatch	·	1.8 km	MPC · JPL
663787	2007 VC_{56}	—	November 1, 2007	Kitt Peak	Spacewatch	·	950 m	MPC · JPL
663788	2007 VA_{65}	—	November 1, 2007	Kitt Peak	Spacewatch	·	580 m	MPC · JPL
663789	2007 VE_{74}	—	October 18, 2007	Kitt Peak	Spacewatch	·	1.4 km	MPC · JPL
663790	2007 VH_{80}	—	October 14, 2001	Kitt Peak	Spacewatch	THM	2.4 km	MPC · JPL
663791	2007 VZ_{82}	—	November 4, 2007	Mount Lemmon	Mount Lemmon Survey	·	520 m	MPC · JPL
663792	2007 VF_{88}	—	November 8, 2007	Catalina	CSS	·	1.7 km	MPC · JPL
663793	2007 VK_{94}	—	November 7, 2007	Bisei	BATTeRS	H	510 m	MPC · JPL
663794	2007 VD_{97}	—	November 1, 2007	Kitt Peak	Spacewatch	·	930 m	MPC · JPL
663795	2007 VP_{104}	—	November 3, 2007	Kitt Peak	Spacewatch	KOR	1.2 km	MPC · JPL
663796	2007 VK_{105}	—	August 24, 2007	Kitt Peak	Spacewatch	·	1.9 km	MPC · JPL
663797	2007 VC_{106}	—	October 9, 2007	Mount Lemmon	Mount Lemmon Survey	·	1.9 km	MPC · JPL
663798	2007 VK_{112}	—	September 14, 2007	Mount Lemmon	Mount Lemmon Survey	·	1.5 km	MPC · JPL
663799	2007 VY_{114}	—	November 3, 2007	Kitt Peak	Spacewatch	·	1.1 km	MPC · JPL
663800	2007 VE_{120}	—	October 9, 2007	Mount Lemmon	Mount Lemmon Survey	·	450 m	MPC · JPL

== 663801–663900 ==
back to top

Designation			Discovery			Properties		Ref
Permanent	Provisional	Named after	Date	Site	Discoverer(s)	Category	Diam.	Ref
663801	2007 VL_{120}	—	April 11, 2005	Kitt Peak	Spacewatch	·	3.3 km	MPC · JPL
663802	2007 VH_{126}	—	September 14, 2007	Mount Lemmon	Mount Lemmon Survey	·	620 m	MPC · JPL
663803	2007 VG_{130}	—	October 7, 2007	Mount Lemmon	Mount Lemmon Survey	·	1.7 km	MPC · JPL
663804	2007 VP_{130}	—	May 7, 2006	Kitt Peak	Spacewatch	·	550 m	MPC · JPL
663805	2007 VL_{136}	—	October 20, 2007	Kitt Peak	Spacewatch	(13314)	1.9 km	MPC · JPL
663806	2007 VY_{144}	—	November 4, 2007	Kitt Peak	Spacewatch	KOR	1.3 km	MPC · JPL
663807	2007 VG_{149}	—	October 12, 2007	Mount Lemmon	Mount Lemmon Survey	·	1.1 km	MPC · JPL
663808	2007 VV_{151}	—	October 4, 2007	Kitt Peak	Spacewatch	·	2.1 km	MPC · JPL
663809	2007 VO_{152}	—	November 2, 2007	Kitt Peak	Spacewatch	H	570 m	MPC · JPL
663810	2007 VL_{156}	—	October 14, 2007	Mount Lemmon	Mount Lemmon Survey	·	810 m	MPC · JPL
663811	2007 VD_{157}	—	November 5, 2007	Kitt Peak	Spacewatch	·	1.3 km	MPC · JPL
663812	2007 VG_{157}	—	November 5, 2007	Kitt Peak	Spacewatch	·	1.4 km	MPC · JPL
663813	2007 VH_{161}	—	October 21, 2007	Mount Lemmon	Mount Lemmon Survey	·	2.4 km	MPC · JPL
663814	2007 VM_{165}	—	August 4, 2003	Kitt Peak	Spacewatch	·	740 m	MPC · JPL
663815	2007 VH_{182}	—	October 12, 2007	Mount Lemmon	Mount Lemmon Survey	·	2.2 km	MPC · JPL
663816	2007 VL_{188}	—	September 22, 2003	Palomar	NEAT	·	1.5 km	MPC · JPL
663817	2007 VF_{219}	—	November 9, 2007	Kitt Peak	Spacewatch	·	970 m	MPC · JPL
663818	2007 VE_{221}	—	November 12, 2007	Mount Lemmon	Mount Lemmon Survey	·	2.3 km	MPC · JPL
663819	2007 VC_{228}	—	November 2, 2007	Kitt Peak	Spacewatch	·	870 m	MPC · JPL
663820	2007 VA_{233}	—	November 7, 2007	Kitt Peak	Spacewatch	KOR	1.3 km	MPC · JPL
663821	2007 VG_{233}	—	October 31, 2007	Mount Lemmon	Mount Lemmon Survey	·	1.3 km	MPC · JPL
663822	2007 VR_{235}	—	April 16, 2005	Kitt Peak	Spacewatch	·	2.0 km	MPC · JPL
663823	2007 VZ_{243}	—	October 16, 2007	Mount Lemmon	Mount Lemmon Survey	·	1.6 km	MPC · JPL
663824	2007 VW_{250}	—	November 9, 2007	Catalina	CSS	·	940 m	MPC · JPL
663825	2007 VB_{253}	—	November 13, 2007	Mount Lemmon	Mount Lemmon Survey	·	850 m	MPC · JPL
663826	2007 VN_{254}	—	November 15, 2007	Mount Lemmon	Mount Lemmon Survey	·	1.5 km	MPC · JPL
663827	2007 VV_{256}	—	November 13, 2007	Mount Lemmon	Mount Lemmon Survey	·	1.4 km	MPC · JPL
663828	2007 VW_{257}	—	November 15, 2007	Mount Lemmon	Mount Lemmon Survey	·	730 m	MPC · JPL
663829	2007 VA_{258}	—	November 2, 2007	Mount Lemmon	Mount Lemmon Survey	·	1.1 km	MPC · JPL
663830	2007 VK_{259}	—	November 15, 2007	Mount Lemmon	Mount Lemmon Survey	·	1.7 km	MPC · JPL
663831	2007 VE_{264}	—	October 16, 2007	Mount Lemmon	Mount Lemmon Survey	·	1.9 km	MPC · JPL
663832	2007 VT_{280}	—	November 3, 2007	Kitt Peak	Spacewatch	·	1.3 km	MPC · JPL
663833	2007 VX_{285}	—	November 5, 2007	Kitt Peak	Spacewatch	·	1.7 km	MPC · JPL
663834	2007 VH_{287}	—	April 11, 2005	Mount Lemmon	Mount Lemmon Survey	MAR	1.2 km	MPC · JPL
663835	2007 VM_{288}	—	November 2, 2007	Kitt Peak	Spacewatch	·	960 m	MPC · JPL
663836	2007 VE_{294}	—	October 20, 2003	Kitt Peak	Spacewatch	·	1.1 km	MPC · JPL
663837	2007 VA_{304}	—	October 12, 2007	Mount Lemmon	Mount Lemmon Survey	PHO	890 m	MPC · JPL
663838	2007 VB_{324}	—	November 8, 2007	Kitt Peak	Spacewatch	·	1.8 km	MPC · JPL
663839	2007 VK_{339}	—	November 9, 2007	Kitt Peak	Spacewatch	·	860 m	MPC · JPL
663840	2007 VW_{339}	—	November 13, 2007	Mount Lemmon	Mount Lemmon Survey	ERI	1.3 km	MPC · JPL
663841	2007 VR_{340}	—	November 4, 2007	Mount Lemmon	Mount Lemmon Survey	·	1.8 km	MPC · JPL
663842	2007 VJ_{342}	—	November 13, 2007	Kitt Peak	Spacewatch	·	2.0 km	MPC · JPL
663843	2007 VM_{342}	—	June 19, 2010	Mount Lemmon	Mount Lemmon Survey	·	1.2 km	MPC · JPL
663844	2007 VG_{344}	—	October 8, 2012	Haleakala	Pan-STARRS 1	·	2.1 km	MPC · JPL
663845	2007 VG_{346}	—	October 11, 2007	Mount Lemmon	Mount Lemmon Survey	·	1.7 km	MPC · JPL
663846	2007 VU_{346}	—	November 2, 2007	Mount Lemmon	Mount Lemmon Survey	·	830 m	MPC · JPL
663847	2007 VC_{348}	—	November 1, 2011	Catalina	CSS	·	1.0 km	MPC · JPL
663848	2007 VL_{350}	—	July 14, 2016	Haleakala	Pan-STARRS 1	KOR	1.0 km	MPC · JPL
663849	2007 VX_{351}	—	June 21, 2017	Haleakala	Pan-STARRS 1	·	2.4 km	MPC · JPL
663850	2007 VQ_{354}	—	May 4, 2014	Haleakala	Pan-STARRS 1	·	910 m	MPC · JPL
663851	2007 VP_{357}	—	September 29, 2017	Haleakala	Pan-STARRS 1	·	1.3 km	MPC · JPL
663852	2007 VU_{357}	—	November 4, 2012	Mount Lemmon	Mount Lemmon Survey	·	1.2 km	MPC · JPL
663853	2007 VM_{358}	—	November 8, 2007	Mount Lemmon	Mount Lemmon Survey	·	1.6 km	MPC · JPL
663854	2007 VZ_{358}	—	November 4, 2007	Kitt Peak	Spacewatch	DOR	2.4 km	MPC · JPL
663855	2007 VR_{359}	—	October 18, 2012	Haleakala	Pan-STARRS 1	KOR	1.2 km	MPC · JPL
663856	2007 VC_{360}	—	November 3, 2007	Mount Lemmon	Mount Lemmon Survey	·	960 m	MPC · JPL
663857	2007 VF_{360}	—	November 9, 2007	Mount Lemmon	Mount Lemmon Survey	EUP	3.3 km	MPC · JPL
663858	2007 VW_{360}	—	November 5, 2007	Kitt Peak	Spacewatch	WIT	960 m	MPC · JPL
663859	2007 VT_{361}	—	November 7, 2007	Kitt Peak	Spacewatch	·	750 m	MPC · JPL
663860	2007 VU_{363}	—	November 3, 2007	Mount Lemmon	Mount Lemmon Survey	·	2.3 km	MPC · JPL
663861	2007 VM_{364}	—	November 5, 2007	Kitt Peak	Spacewatch	·	900 m	MPC · JPL
663862	2007 WK	—	November 16, 2007	Socorro	LINEAR	H	640 m	MPC · JPL
663863	2007 WR_{9}	—	October 30, 2007	Mount Lemmon	Mount Lemmon Survey	·	1.5 km	MPC · JPL
663864	2007 WD_{14}	—	May 21, 2006	Kitt Peak	Spacewatch	NYS	890 m	MPC · JPL
663865	2007 WV_{17}	—	December 20, 2004	Mount Lemmon	Mount Lemmon Survey	·	780 m	MPC · JPL
663866	2007 WA_{18}	—	November 3, 2007	Kitt Peak	Spacewatch	·	1.3 km	MPC · JPL
663867	2007 WE_{24}	—	November 18, 2007	Mount Lemmon	Mount Lemmon Survey	·	1.0 km	MPC · JPL
663868	2007 WW_{25}	—	November 18, 2007	Mount Lemmon	Mount Lemmon Survey	·	1.1 km	MPC · JPL
663869	2007 WL_{26}	—	November 2, 2007	Kitt Peak	Spacewatch	NYS	990 m	MPC · JPL
663870	2007 WY_{26}	—	April 16, 2005	Kitt Peak	Spacewatch	·	2.2 km	MPC · JPL
663871	2007 WM_{27}	—	February 16, 2004	Kitt Peak	Spacewatch	·	2.3 km	MPC · JPL
663872	2007 WS_{29}	—	November 2, 2007	Kitt Peak	Spacewatch	·	1.5 km	MPC · JPL
663873	2007 WY_{33}	—	November 19, 2007	Mount Lemmon	Mount Lemmon Survey	·	1.7 km	MPC · JPL
663874	2007 WN_{38}	—	November 19, 2007	Mount Lemmon	Mount Lemmon Survey	·	890 m	MPC · JPL
663875	2007 WU_{38}	—	December 18, 2003	Kitt Peak	Spacewatch	·	2.2 km	MPC · JPL
663876	2007 WW_{40}	—	April 13, 2005	Catalina	CSS	·	2.6 km	MPC · JPL
663877	2007 WQ_{42}	—	November 8, 2007	Kitt Peak	Spacewatch	·	2.3 km	MPC · JPL
663878	2007 WT_{42}	—	November 18, 2007	XuYi	PMO NEO Survey Program	·	1.9 km	MPC · JPL
663879	2007 WV_{42}	—	November 19, 2007	Kitt Peak	Spacewatch	KOR	1.1 km	MPC · JPL
663880	2007 WC_{46}	—	September 20, 2003	Kitt Peak	Spacewatch	V	590 m	MPC · JPL
663881	2007 WO_{47}	—	October 21, 2007	Mount Lemmon	Mount Lemmon Survey	·	1.7 km	MPC · JPL
663882	2007 WF_{48}	—	November 20, 2007	Mount Lemmon	Mount Lemmon Survey	·	990 m	MPC · JPL
663883	2007 WQ_{49}	—	November 20, 2007	Mount Lemmon	Mount Lemmon Survey	·	600 m	MPC · JPL
663884	2007 WY_{50}	—	September 21, 2003	Kitt Peak	Spacewatch	NYS	970 m	MPC · JPL
663885	2007 WE_{51}	—	November 8, 2007	Kitt Peak	Spacewatch	(5)	860 m	MPC · JPL
663886	2007 WG_{61}	—	November 21, 2007	Mount Lemmon	Mount Lemmon Survey	·	1.7 km	MPC · JPL
663887	2007 WL_{63}	—	November 20, 2007	Kitt Peak	Spacewatch	·	1.9 km	MPC · JPL
663888	2007 WX_{64}	—	November 18, 2007	Mount Lemmon	Mount Lemmon Survey	HNS	1.2 km	MPC · JPL
663889	2007 WZ_{64}	—	November 17, 2007	Mount Lemmon	Mount Lemmon Survey	·	1.1 km	MPC · JPL
663890	2007 WC_{66}	—	August 25, 2014	Haleakala	Pan-STARRS 1	·	710 m	MPC · JPL
663891	2007 WS_{66}	—	November 20, 2007	Kitt Peak	Spacewatch	·	1.5 km	MPC · JPL
663892	2007 WJ_{70}	—	November 14, 1999	Kitt Peak	Spacewatch	·	1.1 km	MPC · JPL
663893	2007 WU_{71}	—	November 19, 2007	Kitt Peak	Spacewatch	·	1.4 km	MPC · JPL
663894	2007 XR_{4}	—	December 3, 2007	Kitt Peak	Spacewatch	·	1.4 km	MPC · JPL
663895	2007 XL_{5}	—	November 9, 2007	Kitt Peak	Spacewatch	KOR	1.2 km	MPC · JPL
663896	2007 XT_{5}	—	November 7, 2007	Kitt Peak	Spacewatch	·	960 m	MPC · JPL
663897	2007 XE_{7}	—	November 16, 2007	Charleston	R. Holmes	·	860 m	MPC · JPL
663898	2007 XQ_{8}	—	March 6, 1999	Kitt Peak	Spacewatch	·	1.0 km	MPC · JPL
663899	2007 XW_{14}	—	December 5, 2007	Mount Lemmon	Mount Lemmon Survey	·	1.2 km	MPC · JPL
663900	2007 XE_{27}	—	December 14, 2007	Kitt Peak	Spacewatch	KOR	1.4 km	MPC · JPL

== 663901–664000 ==
back to top

Designation			Discovery			Properties		Ref
Permanent	Provisional	Named after	Date	Site	Discoverer(s)	Category	Diam.	Ref
663901	2007 XK_{37}	—	December 13, 2007	Socorro	LINEAR	·	2.6 km	MPC · JPL
663902	2007 XH_{49}	—	December 15, 2007	Kitt Peak	Spacewatch	·	980 m	MPC · JPL
663903	2007 XN_{63}	—	July 7, 2016	Haleakala	Pan-STARRS 1	·	1.3 km	MPC · JPL
663904	2007 XO_{63}	—	June 26, 2011	Mount Lemmon	Mount Lemmon Survey	·	1.6 km	MPC · JPL
663905	2007 XW_{63}	—	February 12, 2004	Kitt Peak	Spacewatch	·	1.1 km	MPC · JPL
663906	2007 XE_{64}	—	December 3, 2007	Kitt Peak	Spacewatch	·	1.3 km	MPC · JPL
663907	2007 XB_{65}	—	December 6, 2007	Catalina	CSS	·	2.0 km	MPC · JPL
663908	2007 XC_{65}	—	November 24, 2012	Kitt Peak	Spacewatch	·	2.2 km	MPC · JPL
663909	2007 XC_{66}	—	October 25, 2011	Haleakala	Pan-STARRS 1	·	870 m	MPC · JPL
663910	2007 XT_{66}	—	February 27, 2014	Haleakala	Pan-STARRS 1	·	1.6 km	MPC · JPL
663911	2007 XA_{67}	—	December 5, 2007	Kitt Peak	Spacewatch	·	1.3 km	MPC · JPL
663912	2007 XE_{72}	—	December 15, 2007	Mount Lemmon	Mount Lemmon Survey	·	1.3 km	MPC · JPL
663913	2007 YW_{3}	—	December 20, 2007	Mount Lemmon	Mount Lemmon Survey	T_{j} (2.9)	4.6 km	MPC · JPL
663914	2007 YD_{5}	—	December 16, 2007	Catalina	CSS	·	1.4 km	MPC · JPL
663915	2007 YX_{19}	—	December 16, 2007	Kitt Peak	Spacewatch	KOR	1.4 km	MPC · JPL
663916	2007 YS_{21}	—	December 4, 2007	Kitt Peak	Spacewatch	NEM	2.7 km	MPC · JPL
663917	2007 YX_{21}	—	December 16, 2007	Kitt Peak	Spacewatch	·	1.9 km	MPC · JPL
663918	2007 YH_{22}	—	December 4, 2007	Mount Lemmon	Mount Lemmon Survey	·	1.2 km	MPC · JPL
663919	2007 YE_{25}	—	December 18, 2007	Kitt Peak	Spacewatch	·	3.8 km	MPC · JPL
663920	2007 YA_{27}	—	December 18, 2007	Mount Lemmon	Mount Lemmon Survey	·	1.1 km	MPC · JPL
663921	2007 YU_{30}	—	December 28, 2007	Kitt Peak	Spacewatch	·	2.1 km	MPC · JPL
663922	2007 YK_{32}	—	December 28, 2007	Kitt Peak	Spacewatch	H	360 m	MPC · JPL
663923	2007 YU_{36}	—	December 30, 2007	Mount Lemmon	Mount Lemmon Survey	·	1.6 km	MPC · JPL
663924	2007 YX_{44}	—	December 30, 2007	Mount Lemmon	Mount Lemmon Survey	·	2.1 km	MPC · JPL
663925	2007 YY_{44}	—	December 30, 2007	Kitt Peak	Spacewatch	(5)	940 m	MPC · JPL
663926	2007 YK_{55}	—	December 31, 2007	Mount Lemmon	Mount Lemmon Survey	·	1.4 km	MPC · JPL
663927	2007 YO_{56}	—	December 30, 2007	Kitt Peak	Spacewatch	APO	330 m	MPC · JPL
663928	2007 YC_{60}	—	December 20, 2007	Catalina	CSS	·	2.8 km	MPC · JPL
663929	2007 YZ_{68}	—	November 5, 2007	Kitt Peak	Spacewatch	·	1.3 km	MPC · JPL
663930	2007 YG_{76}	—	December 16, 2007	Mount Lemmon	Mount Lemmon Survey	·	1.6 km	MPC · JPL
663931	2007 YH_{77}	—	December 5, 2007	Kitt Peak	Spacewatch	·	1.5 km	MPC · JPL
663932	2007 YY_{77}	—	April 13, 2013	Haleakala	Pan-STARRS 1	·	1.4 km	MPC · JPL
663933	2007 YR_{78}	—	August 13, 2010	Kitt Peak	Spacewatch	·	1.1 km	MPC · JPL
663934	2007 YC_{79}	—	December 30, 2007	Kitt Peak	Spacewatch	·	1.2 km	MPC · JPL
663935	2007 YA_{80}	—	December 16, 2007	Mount Lemmon	Mount Lemmon Survey	·	760 m	MPC · JPL
663936	2007 YT_{80}	—	December 3, 2012	Mount Lemmon	Mount Lemmon Survey	·	1.3 km	MPC · JPL
663937	2007 YK_{83}	—	March 31, 2009	Kitt Peak	Spacewatch	·	1.6 km	MPC · JPL
663938	2007 YY_{87}	—	August 12, 2016	Haleakala	Pan-STARRS 1	·	1.7 km	MPC · JPL
663939	2007 YK_{90}	—	December 18, 2007	Kitt Peak	Spacewatch	·	1.8 km	MPC · JPL
663940	2007 YQ_{92}	—	December 17, 2007	Kitt Peak	Spacewatch	KOR	1.3 km	MPC · JPL
663941	2007 YQ_{93}	—	December 16, 2007	Mount Lemmon	Mount Lemmon Survey	·	760 m	MPC · JPL
663942	2007 YD_{94}	—	December 17, 2007	Mount Lemmon	Mount Lemmon Survey	·	2.4 km	MPC · JPL
663943	2008 AW_{5}	—	November 2, 2007	Kitt Peak	Spacewatch	·	2.0 km	MPC · JPL
663944	2008 AZ_{11}	—	January 10, 2008	Mount Lemmon	Mount Lemmon Survey	·	830 m	MPC · JPL
663945	2008 AM_{14}	—	December 19, 2007	Charleston	R. Holmes	·	1.9 km	MPC · JPL
663946	2008 AB_{16}	—	December 31, 2007	Kitt Peak	Spacewatch	HOF	2.4 km	MPC · JPL
663947	2008 AS_{17}	—	December 30, 2007	Mount Lemmon	Mount Lemmon Survey	·	1.8 km	MPC · JPL
663948	2008 AW_{25}	—	January 10, 2008	Mount Lemmon	Mount Lemmon Survey	·	1.7 km	MPC · JPL
663949	2008 AM_{27}	—	January 10, 2008	Mount Lemmon	Mount Lemmon Survey	HNS	870 m	MPC · JPL
663950	2008 AX_{31}	—	January 10, 2008	Catalina	CSS	·	1.3 km	MPC · JPL
663951	2008 AS_{41}	—	September 26, 2006	Mount Lemmon	Mount Lemmon Survey	KOR	1.3 km	MPC · JPL
663952	2008 AS_{46}	—	January 3, 2008	Kitt Peak	Spacewatch	·	890 m	MPC · JPL
663953	2008 AU_{52}	—	December 30, 2007	Mount Lemmon	Mount Lemmon Survey	·	1.8 km	MPC · JPL
663954	2008 AF_{60}	—	January 11, 2008	Kitt Peak	Spacewatch	·	1.8 km	MPC · JPL
663955	2008 AM_{61}	—	January 11, 2008	Kitt Peak	Spacewatch	·	1.6 km	MPC · JPL
663956	2008 AN_{62}	—	October 22, 2006	Kitt Peak	Spacewatch	·	1.7 km	MPC · JPL
663957	2008 AJ_{66}	—	January 11, 2008	Kitt Peak	Spacewatch	·	720 m	MPC · JPL
663958	2008 AA_{69}	—	January 11, 2008	Kitt Peak	Spacewatch	·	1.9 km	MPC · JPL
663959	2008 AZ_{78}	—	December 6, 2007	Mount Lemmon	Mount Lemmon Survey	·	1.8 km	MPC · JPL
663960	2008 AR_{88}	—	December 30, 2007	Kitt Peak	Spacewatch	·	1.7 km	MPC · JPL
663961	2008 AS_{96}	—	December 18, 2007	Mount Lemmon	Mount Lemmon Survey	·	780 m	MPC · JPL
663962	2008 AU_{102}	—	September 17, 2006	Kitt Peak	Spacewatch	HYG	2.9 km	MPC · JPL
663963	2008 AL_{117}	—	January 10, 2008	Lulin	LUSS	·	2.3 km	MPC · JPL
663964	2008 AJ_{121}	—	January 30, 2008	Mount Lemmon	Mount Lemmon Survey	·	3.2 km	MPC · JPL
663965	2008 AC_{123}	—	February 25, 2008	Mount Lemmon	Mount Lemmon Survey	·	1.8 km	MPC · JPL
663966	2008 AX_{127}	—	January 11, 2008	Kitt Peak	Spacewatch	·	1.6 km	MPC · JPL
663967	2008 AP_{128}	—	January 14, 2008	Kitt Peak	Spacewatch	·	1.6 km	MPC · JPL
663968	2008 AC_{131}	—	October 21, 2006	Mount Lemmon	Mount Lemmon Survey	AGN	1.2 km	MPC · JPL
663969	2008 AF_{137}	—	January 18, 2008	Mount Lemmon	Mount Lemmon Survey	·	2.9 km	MPC · JPL
663970	2008 AT_{139}	—	January 11, 2008	Catalina	CSS	·	1.2 km	MPC · JPL
663971	2008 AF_{140}	—	January 12, 2008	Kitt Peak	Spacewatch	·	1.4 km	MPC · JPL
663972	2008 AH_{140}	—	August 2, 2016	Haleakala	Pan-STARRS 1	·	1.6 km	MPC · JPL
663973	2008 AE_{141}	—	August 20, 2017	Haleakala	Pan-STARRS 1	·	2.2 km	MPC · JPL
663974	2008 AK_{141}	—	June 18, 2010	Mount Lemmon	Mount Lemmon Survey	·	2.1 km	MPC · JPL
663975	2008 AV_{141}	—	April 11, 2013	Kitt Peak	Spacewatch	·	1.2 km	MPC · JPL
663976	2008 AD_{142}	—	April 23, 2014	Cerro Tololo-DECam	DECam	·	1.4 km	MPC · JPL
663977	2008 AE_{142}	—	September 28, 2006	Kitt Peak	Spacewatch	·	1.4 km	MPC · JPL
663978	2008 AM_{145}	—	December 18, 2007	Mount Lemmon	Mount Lemmon Survey	·	1.5 km	MPC · JPL
663979	2008 AS_{145}	—	January 1, 2008	Kitt Peak	Spacewatch	·	3.9 km	MPC · JPL
663980	2008 AD_{146}	—	January 14, 2008	Kitt Peak	Spacewatch	·	1.5 km	MPC · JPL
663981	2008 AO_{146}	—	January 18, 2013	Kitt Peak	Spacewatch	AGN	990 m	MPC · JPL
663982	2008 AO_{147}	—	May 3, 2014	Mount Lemmon	Mount Lemmon Survey	·	1.9 km	MPC · JPL
663983	2008 AG_{149}	—	November 7, 2012	Kitt Peak	Spacewatch	·	1.8 km	MPC · JPL
663984	2008 AN_{150}	—	January 12, 2008	Mount Lemmon	Mount Lemmon Survey	·	970 m	MPC · JPL
663985	2008 AE_{156}	—	January 1, 2008	Kitt Peak	Spacewatch	·	700 m	MPC · JPL
663986	2008 BD_{1}	—	January 16, 2008	Mount Lemmon	Mount Lemmon Survey	H	450 m	MPC · JPL
663987	2008 BS_{1}	—	January 16, 2008	Mount Lemmon	Mount Lemmon Survey	H	410 m	MPC · JPL
663988	2008 BO_{5}	—	January 16, 2008	Mount Lemmon	Mount Lemmon Survey	·	760 m	MPC · JPL
663989	2008 BF_{7}	—	December 20, 2007	Kitt Peak	Spacewatch	·	1.1 km	MPC · JPL
663990	2008 BO_{9}	—	September 19, 2001	Apache Point	SDSS Collaboration	·	2.1 km	MPC · JPL
663991	2008 BN_{25}	—	March 8, 2003	Kitt Peak	Spacewatch	·	1.3 km	MPC · JPL
663992	2008 BS_{27}	—	September 27, 2006	Mount Lemmon	Mount Lemmon Survey	·	1.9 km	MPC · JPL
663993	2008 BP_{29}	—	January 30, 2008	Mount Lemmon	Mount Lemmon Survey	·	770 m	MPC · JPL
663994	2008 BR_{34}	—	January 30, 2008	Kitt Peak	Spacewatch	·	2.2 km	MPC · JPL
663995	2008 BS_{45}	—	January 31, 2008	Catalina	CSS	BRA	1.8 km	MPC · JPL
663996	2008 BK_{47}	—	January 30, 2008	Catalina	CSS	·	1.4 km	MPC · JPL
663997	2008 BE_{49}	—	January 31, 2008	Mount Lemmon	Mount Lemmon Survey	·	1.7 km	MPC · JPL
663998	2008 BD_{53}	—	January 18, 2008	Mount Lemmon	Mount Lemmon Survey	JUN	1.1 km	MPC · JPL
663999	2008 BD_{57}	—	January 18, 2008	Kitt Peak	Spacewatch	·	1.9 km	MPC · JPL
664000	2008 BF_{57}	—	October 24, 2013	Kitt Peak	Spacewatch	·	630 m	MPC · JPL

back to top

== Meaning of names ==
As minor planet discoveries are confirmed, they are given a permanent number by the IAU's Minor Planet Center (MPC), and the discoverers can then submit names for them, following the IAU's naming conventions. The list below concerns those minor planets in the specified number-range that have received names, and explains the meanings of those names.

Official naming citations of newly named small Solar System bodies are approved and published in a bulletin by IAU's Working Group for Small Bodies Nomenclature (WGSBN). Before May 2021, citations were published in MPC's Minor Planet Circulars for many decades. Recent citations can also be found on the JPL Small-Body Database (SBDB). Until his death in 2016, German astronomer Lutz D. Schmadel compiled these citations into the Dictionary of Minor Planet Names (DMP) and regularly updated the collection.

Based on Paul Herget's The Names of the Minor Planets, Schmadel also researched the unclear origin of numerous asteroids, most of which had been named prior to World War II. This article incorporates text from this source, which is in the public domain: SBDB New namings may only be added to this list below after official publication as the preannouncement of names is condemned. The WGSBN publishes a comprehensive guideline for the naming rules of non-cometary small Solar System bodies.

Named minor planet	Provisional	This minor planet was named for...	Ref · Catalog
663271 Heinzreinhardt	2007 EW_{26}	Heinz Reinhardt (1939–2020), a German amateur astronomer.	IAU · 663271
663467 Limeishu	2007 OT_{4}	Li Mei-shu (1902–1983), Taiwanese painter, sculptor and educator.	IAU · 663467
663468 Liaochichun	2007 OQ_{5}	Liao Chi-chun (1902–1976), Taiwanese painter, sculptor and educator.	IAU · 663468
