= List of minor planets: 793001–794000 =

The following is a partial list of minor planets, running from minor-planet number 793001 through 794000, inclusive. The primary data for this and other partial lists is based on JPL's "Small-Body Orbital Elements" and data available from the Minor Planet Center. Critical list information is also provided by the MPC, unless otherwise specified from Lowell Observatory. A detailed description of the table's columns and additional sources are given on the main page including a complete list of every page in this series, and a statistical break-up on the dynamical classification of minor planets.

Also see the summary list of all named bodies in numerical and alphabetical order, and the corresponding naming citations for the number range of this particular list. New namings may only be added to this list after official publication, as the preannouncement of names is condemned by the Working Group for Small Bodies Nomenclature of the International Astronomical Union.

Near-Earth obj.	MBA (inner)	MBA (outer)	Centaur
Mars-crosser	MBA (middle)	Jupiter trojan	Trans-Neptunian obj.
Unclassified

== 793001–793100 ==
Designation			Discovery			Properties		Ref
Permanent	Provisional	Named after	Date	Site	Discoverer(s)	Category	Diam.	Ref
793001	2023 RP_{77}	—	November 3, 2014	Mount Lemmon	Mount Lemmon Survey	·	1.6 km	MPC · JPL
793002	2023 RC_{78}	—	September 10, 2023	Haleakala	Pan-STARRS 1	·	1.2 km	MPC · JPL
793003	2023 RQ_{81}	—	August 24, 2017	Haleakala	Pan-STARRS 1	·	2.2 km	MPC · JPL
793004	2023 RA_{83}	—	October 10, 2007	Mount Lemmon	Mount Lemmon Survey	·	1.2 km	MPC · JPL
793005	2023 RT_{87}	—	September 15, 2023	Haleakala	Pan-STARRS 2	EOS	1.4 km	MPC · JPL
793006	2023 RU_{105}	—	October 2, 2018	Haleakala	Pan-STARRS 2	EOS	1.1 km	MPC · JPL
793007	2023 RB_{106}	—	September 18, 2011	Mount Lemmon	Mount Lemmon Survey	·	2.0 km	MPC · JPL
793008	2023 RG_{106}	—	October 29, 2014	Kitt Peak	Spacewatch	·	1.3 km	MPC · JPL
793009	2023 RV_{168}	—	October 28, 2014	Haleakala	Pan-STARRS 1	·	1.2 km	MPC · JPL
793010	2023 RX_{168}	—	January 14, 2011	Mount Lemmon	Mount Lemmon Survey	·	1.2 km	MPC · JPL
793011	2023 SH_{9}	—	March 3, 2014	Cerro Tololo	High Cadence Transient Survey	THB	1.8 km	MPC · JPL
793012	2023 SA_{11}	—	October 16, 2007	Kitt Peak	Spacewatch	TIR	1.9 km	MPC · JPL
793013	2023 SA_{12}	—	September 19, 2023	Mount Lemmon	Mount Lemmon Survey	·	1.4 km	MPC · JPL
793014	2023 SL_{14}	—	September 15, 2023	Haleakala	Pan-STARRS 2	·	1.4 km	MPC · JPL
793015	2023 SK_{15}	—	August 24, 2017	Haleakala	Pan-STARRS 1	·	2.1 km	MPC · JPL
793016	2023 SM_{16}	—	November 3, 2005	Kitt Peak	Spacewatch	·	1.1 km	MPC · JPL
793017	2023 SJ_{17}	—	October 4, 2018	Haleakala	Pan-STARRS 2	·	2.0 km	MPC · JPL
793018	2023 SF_{24}	—	September 19, 2023	Haleakala	Pan-STARRS 1	EOS	1.1 km	MPC · JPL
793019	2023 SH_{24}	—	November 17, 2018	Mount Lemmon	Mount Lemmon Survey	·	1.7 km	MPC · JPL
793020	2023 SR_{24}	—	September 20, 2023	Haleakala	Pan-STARRS 2	EOS	1.2 km	MPC · JPL
793021	2023 SR_{25}	—	January 21, 2020	Haleakala	Pan-STARRS 2	·	1.2 km	MPC · JPL
793022	2023 SQ_{27}	—	April 4, 2016	Haleakala	Pan-STARRS 1	·	1.6 km	MPC · JPL
793023	2023 SP_{28}	—	September 28, 2006	Kitt Peak	Spacewatch	·	1.8 km	MPC · JPL
793024	2023 SE_{30}	—	April 9, 2016	Haleakala	Pan-STARRS 1	·	2.1 km	MPC · JPL
793025	2023 SU_{30}	—	July 27, 2017	Haleakala	Pan-STARRS 1	·	2.3 km	MPC · JPL
793026	2023 SW_{34}	—	August 3, 2017	Haleakala	Pan-STARRS 1	·	1.8 km	MPC · JPL
793027	2023 SN_{35}	—	September 20, 2023	Mount Lemmon	Mount Lemmon Survey	·	1.1 km	MPC · JPL
793028	2023 SD_{47}	—	September 27, 2023	Haleakala	Pan-STARRS 1	·	1.8 km	MPC · JPL
793029	2023 SG_{66}	—	October 16, 2012	Mount Lemmon	Mount Lemmon Survey	·	1.7 km	MPC · JPL
793030	2023 SV_{66}	—	October 25, 2014	Haleakala	Pan-STARRS 1	AGN	840 m	MPC · JPL
793031	2023 SZ_{66}	—	September 19, 2023	Haleakala	Pan-STARRS 1	·	2.3 km	MPC · JPL
793032	2023 TR_{4}	—	January 18, 2008	Mount Lemmon	Mount Lemmon Survey	THB	1.7 km	MPC · JPL
793033	2023 TO_{5}	—	February 27, 2014	Mount Lemmon	Mount Lemmon Survey	·	2.2 km	MPC · JPL
793034	2023 TH_{11}	—	September 16, 2017	Haleakala	Pan-STARRS 1	VER	1.9 km	MPC · JPL
793035	2023 TD_{13}	—	November 13, 2015	Mount Lemmon	Mount Lemmon Survey	·	770 m	MPC · JPL
793036	2023 TL_{18}	—	April 18, 2015	Cerro Tololo	DECam	·	2.2 km	MPC · JPL
793037	2023 TB_{21}	—	October 11, 2012	Haleakala	Pan-STARRS 1	·	1.9 km	MPC · JPL
793038	2023 TB_{26}	—	April 19, 2015	Cerro Tololo	DECam	·	2.1 km	MPC · JPL
793039	2023 TK_{28}	—	October 26, 2014	Mount Lemmon	Mount Lemmon Survey	AGN	900 m	MPC · JPL
793040	2023 TM_{28}	—	October 17, 2012	Haleakala	Pan-STARRS 1	·	1.7 km	MPC · JPL
793041	2023 TK_{35}	—	September 6, 2008	Mount Lemmon	Mount Lemmon Survey	KOR	1.0 km	MPC · JPL
793042	2023 TP_{42}	—	November 6, 2005	Mount Lemmon	Mount Lemmon Survey	·	1.2 km	MPC · JPL
793043	2023 TA_{51}	—	December 26, 2014	Haleakala	Pan-STARRS 1	·	1.3 km	MPC · JPL
793044	2023 TA_{70}	—	November 17, 2014	Haleakala	Pan-STARRS 1	AGN	640 m	MPC · JPL
793045	2023 TX_{75}	—	October 11, 2023	Haleakala	Pan-STARRS 2	VER	1.7 km	MPC · JPL
793046	2023 TV_{83}	—	January 25, 2020	Mount Lemmon	Mount Lemmon Survey	KOR	970 m	MPC · JPL
793047	2023 TA_{86}	—	October 10, 2023	Haleakala	Pan-STARRS 1	·	2.6 km	MPC · JPL
793048	2023 TF_{87}	—	February 13, 2008	Kitt Peak	Spacewatch	·	2.1 km	MPC · JPL
793049	2023 TN_{95}	—	October 15, 2023	Haleakala	Pan-STARRS 1	·	1.9 km	MPC · JPL
793050	2023 TN_{97}	—	October 11, 2023	Haleakala	Pan-STARRS 2	·	2.5 km	MPC · JPL
793051	2023 TX_{98}	—	September 21, 2009	Mount Lemmon	Mount Lemmon Survey	·	1.1 km	MPC · JPL
793052	2023 TM_{125}	—	October 13, 2023	Haleakala	Pan-STARRS 2	·	3.0 km	MPC · JPL
793053	2023 TA_{137}	—	October 9, 2013	Mount Lemmon	Mount Lemmon Survey	KOR	960 m	MPC · JPL
793054	2023 TK_{139}	—	October 5, 2023	Haleakala	Pan-STARRS 1	·	2.0 km	MPC · JPL
793055	2023 TJ_{142}	—	November 17, 2014	Haleakala	Pan-STARRS 1	·	1.2 km	MPC · JPL
793056	2023 TE_{161}	—	September 21, 2009	Mount Lemmon	Mount Lemmon Survey	AGN	910 m	MPC · JPL
793057	2023 TM_{194}	—	January 5, 2014	Haleakala	Pan-STARRS 1	·	1.9 km	MPC · JPL
793058	2023 UO_{6}	—	December 31, 2018	Haleakala	Pan-STARRS 1	·	1.8 km	MPC · JPL
793059	2023 UD_{12}	—	November 11, 2009	Kitt Peak	Spacewatch	·	1.3 km	MPC · JPL
793060	2023 UK_{15}	—	October 21, 2023	Haleakala	Pan-STARRS 1	HOF	1.7 km	MPC · JPL
793061	2023 UY_{27}	—	October 17, 2023	Haleakala	Pan-STARRS 2	·	1.5 km	MPC · JPL
793062	2023 UE_{89}	—	January 7, 2019	Haleakala	Pan-STARRS 1	·	2.3 km	MPC · JPL
793063	2023 UD_{90}	—	October 17, 2023	Mount Lemmon	Mount Lemmon Survey	·	1.7 km	MPC · JPL
793064	2023 VQ_{30}	—	November 8, 2023	Haleakala	Pan-STARRS 1	·	860 m	MPC · JPL
793065	2023 VN_{33}	—	February 5, 2016	Haleakala	Pan-STARRS 1	·	1.4 km	MPC · JPL
793066	2023 WG_{42}	—	December 23, 2012	Haleakala	Pan-STARRS 1	·	1.6 km	MPC · JPL
793067	1995 QY_{15}	—	August 31, 1995	Kitt Peak	Spacewatch	·	1.5 km	MPC · JPL
793068	1995 SK_{22}	—	September 19, 1995	Kitt Peak	Spacewatch	·	2.1 km	MPC · JPL
793069	1995 SR_{33}	—	September 22, 1995	Kitt Peak	Spacewatch	THM	1.6 km	MPC · JPL
793070	1995 SY_{55}	—	September 22, 1995	Kitt Peak	Spacewatch	T_{j} (2.97)	1.9 km	MPC · JPL
793071	1995 SR_{67}	—	September 18, 1995	Kitt Peak	Spacewatch	·	1.7 km	MPC · JPL
793072	1995 TJ_{1}	—	October 14, 1995	Xinglong County	SCAP	·	1.1 km	MPC · JPL
793073	1995 TO_{3}	—	October 15, 1995	Kitt Peak	Spacewatch	·	1.1 km	MPC · JPL
793074	1995 UN_{14}	—	October 17, 1995	Kitt Peak	Spacewatch	·	1.9 km	MPC · JPL
793075	1995 UP_{63}	—	October 26, 1995	Kitt Peak	Spacewatch	·	1.6 km	MPC · JPL
793076	1995 UQ_{77}	—	October 22, 1995	Kitt Peak	Spacewatch	·	1.6 km	MPC · JPL
793077	1995 UG_{84}	—	October 28, 1995	Kitt Peak	Spacewatch	MAS	480 m	MPC · JPL
793078	1995 VT_{10}	—	November 15, 1995	Kitt Peak	Spacewatch	AGN	820 m	MPC · JPL
793079	1996 AA_{10}	—	January 13, 1996	Kitt Peak	Spacewatch	LIX	2.2 km	MPC · JPL
793080	1996 AZ_{17}	—	January 13, 1996	Kitt Peak	Spacewatch	·	760 m	MPC · JPL
793081	1996 TP_{22}	—	October 6, 1996	Kitt Peak	Spacewatch	·	1.1 km	MPC · JPL
793082	1996 TF_{35}	—	October 11, 1996	Kitt Peak	Spacewatch	·	1.0 km	MPC · JPL
793083	1997 LA_{1}	—	June 1, 1997	Kitt Peak	Spacewatch	·	630 m	MPC · JPL
793084	1997 OJ_{3}	—	December 15, 2014	Mount Lemmon	Mount Lemmon Survey	·	690 m	MPC · JPL
793085	1997 SO_{9}	—	September 28, 1997	Kitt Peak	Spacewatch	NYS	820 m	MPC · JPL
793086	1997 TV_{30}	—	October 9, 1997	Kitt Peak	Spacewatch	·	1.1 km	MPC · JPL
793087	1998 KF_{11}	—	May 23, 1998	Kitt Peak	Spacewatch	·	840 m	MPC · JPL
793088	1998 SB_{31}	—	September 20, 1998	Kitt Peak	Spacewatch	·	620 m	MPC · JPL
793089	1998 SW_{41}	—	September 26, 1998	Kitt Peak	Spacewatch	·	1.1 km	MPC · JPL
793090	1998 SU_{181}	—	September 19, 1998	Sacramento Peak	SDSS	KOR	820 m	MPC · JPL
793091	1998 TZ_{13}	—	October 13, 1998	Kitt Peak	Spacewatch	NYS	760 m	MPC · JPL
793092	1998 UH_{10}	—	October 16, 1998	Kitt Peak	Spacewatch	·	1.4 km	MPC · JPL
793093	1998 UJ_{14}	—	October 23, 1998	Kitt Peak	Spacewatch	·	1.5 km	MPC · JPL
793094	1998 YO_{21}	—	December 26, 1998	Kitt Peak	Spacewatch	·	1.2 km	MPC · JPL
793095	1999 CM_{143}	—	February 8, 1999	Mauna Kea	C. Veillet, J. Anderson	·	430 m	MPC · JPL
793096	1999 FB_{101}	—	April 27, 2012	Haleakala	Pan-STARRS 1	·	1.5 km	MPC · JPL
793097	1999 LE_{37}	—	October 13, 2010	Mount Lemmon	Mount Lemmon Survey	·	760 m	MPC · JPL
793098	1999 NY_{4}	—	July 13, 1999	Socorro	LINEAR	·	420 m	MPC · JPL
793099	1999 PC_{7}	—	August 6, 1999	Cerro Tololo	Parker, J. W.	·	1.7 km	MPC · JPL
793100	1999 RY_{86}	—	September 4, 1999	Catalina	CSS	·	1.2 km	MPC · JPL

== 793101–793200 ==
back to top

Designation			Discovery			Properties		Ref
Permanent	Provisional	Named after	Date	Site	Discoverer(s)	Category	Diam.	Ref
793101	1999 RB_{225}	—	September 7, 1999	Socorro	LINEAR	·	920 m	MPC · JPL
793102	1999 RJ_{260}	—	September 18, 2006	Kitt Peak	Spacewatch	·	650 m	MPC · JPL
793103	1999 SP_{29}	—	October 27, 2016	Mount Lemmon	Mount Lemmon Survey	·	930 m	MPC · JPL
793104	1999 TU_{69}	—	October 9, 1999	Kitt Peak	Spacewatch	·	460 m	MPC · JPL
793105	1999 TW_{74}	—	October 10, 1999	Kitt Peak	Spacewatch	EOS	1.3 km	MPC · JPL
793106	1999 TN_{173}	—	October 9, 1999	Catalina	CSS	·	580 m	MPC · JPL
793107	1999 TB_{263}	—	October 15, 1999	Kitt Peak	Spacewatch	KOR	1.0 km	MPC · JPL
793108	1999 TS_{306}	—	October 2, 1999	Kitt Peak	Spacewatch	·	2.0 km	MPC · JPL
793109	1999 TJ_{339}	—	October 4, 1999	Kitt Peak	Spacewatch	·	1.3 km	MPC · JPL
793110	1999 TH_{342}	—	August 28, 2014	Haleakala	Pan-STARRS 1	NAE	1.6 km	MPC · JPL
793111	1999 UV_{18}	—	October 30, 1999	Kitt Peak	Spacewatch	EOS	1.3 km	MPC · JPL
793112	1999 UL_{35}	—	October 31, 1999	Kitt Peak	Spacewatch	·	750 m	MPC · JPL
793113	1999 VK_{84}	—	November 6, 1999	Kitt Peak	Spacewatch	·	550 m	MPC · JPL
793114	1999 VU_{129}	—	November 11, 1999	Kitt Peak	Spacewatch	·	1.7 km	MPC · JPL
793115	1999 VE_{142}	—	November 10, 1999	Kitt Peak	Spacewatch	·	840 m	MPC · JPL
793116	1999 VX_{233}	—	September 6, 2015	Haleakala	Pan-STARRS 1	·	680 m	MPC · JPL
793117	1999 WO_{28}	—	November 16, 1999	Kitt Peak	Spacewatch	·	540 m	MPC · JPL
793118	1999 WQ_{28}	—	August 2, 2016	Haleakala	Pan-STARRS 1	·	690 m	MPC · JPL
793119	1999 WY_{28}	—	October 10, 2016	Haleakala	Pan-STARRS 1	EUP	2.4 km	MPC · JPL
793120	1999 XE_{150}	—	December 8, 1999	Kitt Peak	Spacewatch	·	760 m	MPC · JPL
793121	1999 XX_{266}	—	December 12, 1999	Kitt Peak	Spacewatch	·	970 m	MPC · JPL
793122	2000 AR_{219}	—	January 8, 2000	Kitt Peak	Spacewatch	(5)	770 m	MPC · JPL
793123	2000 CT_{104}	—	February 5, 2000	Kitt Peak	Spacewatch	·	1.0 km	MPC · JPL
793124	2000 CA_{111}	—	February 4, 2000	Kitt Peak	Spacewatch	(5)	760 m	MPC · JPL
793125	2000 CM_{152}	—	February 27, 2006	Kitt Peak	Spacewatch	THM	1.7 km	MPC · JPL
793126	2000 CV_{156}	—	December 4, 2007	Kitt Peak	Spacewatch	·	750 m	MPC · JPL
793127	2000 CY_{156}	—	March 1, 2016	Mount Lemmon	Mount Lemmon Survey	·	1.5 km	MPC · JPL
793128	2000 EW_{73}	—	March 10, 2000	Kitt Peak	Spacewatch	·	800 m	MPC · JPL
793129	2000 EB_{204}	—	March 6, 2000	Cerro Tololo	Deep Lens Survey	·	2.3 km	MPC · JPL
793130	2000 EG_{204}	—	March 6, 2000	Cerro Tololo	Deep Lens Survey	·	2.4 km	MPC · JPL
793131	2000 EN_{204}	—	March 6, 2000	Cerro Tololo	Deep Lens Survey	·	1.1 km	MPC · JPL
793132	2000 EJ_{210}	—	February 23, 2015	Haleakala	Pan-STARRS 1	·	1.4 km	MPC · JPL
793133	2000 GV_{128}	—	March 27, 2000	Kitt Peak	Spacewatch	·	870 m	MPC · JPL
793134	2000 HH_{106}	—	April 21, 2014	Mount Lemmon	Mount Lemmon Survey	DOR	1.7 km	MPC · JPL
793135	2000 ML_{7}	—	June 30, 2000	La Silla	Barbieri, C.	THM	1.9 km	MPC · JPL
793136	2000 OB_{65}	—	July 31, 2000	Cerro Tololo	Deep Ecliptic Survey	·	870 m	MPC · JPL
793137	2000 PQ_{33}	—	February 10, 2014	Haleakala	Pan-STARRS 1	EOS	1.2 km	MPC · JPL
793138	2000 PL_{34}	—	August 1, 2000	Cerro Tololo	Deep Ecliptic Survey	·	1.4 km	MPC · JPL
793139	2000 QR_{235}	—	August 26, 2000	Cerro Tololo	Deep Ecliptic Survey	·	1.1 km	MPC · JPL
793140	2000 QC_{238}	—	August 27, 2000	Cerro Tololo	Deep Ecliptic Survey	EOS	1.3 km	MPC · JPL
793141	2000 QQ_{256}	—	March 29, 2012	Mount Lemmon	Mount Lemmon Survey	·	1.2 km	MPC · JPL
793142	2000 QX_{258}	—	March 8, 2017	Mount Lemmon	Mount Lemmon Survey	·	1.4 km	MPC · JPL
793143	2000 QZ_{259}	—	September 26, 2017	Haleakala	Pan-STARRS 1	·	1.9 km	MPC · JPL
793144	2000 QR_{260}	—	November 14, 2012	Mount Lemmon	Mount Lemmon Survey	·	1.6 km	MPC · JPL
793145	2000 QS_{260}	—	February 23, 2003	Kitt Peak	Spacewatch	·	1.9 km	MPC · JPL
793146	2000 RT_{59}	—	September 7, 2000	Kitt Peak	Spacewatch	·	1.1 km	MPC · JPL
793147	2000 RZ_{109}	—	May 8, 2008	Kitt Peak	Spacewatch	ADE	1.3 km	MPC · JPL
793148	2000 RK_{110}	—	August 14, 2013	Haleakala	Pan-STARRS 1	·	1.1 km	MPC · JPL
793149	2000 SS_{383}	—	August 23, 2014	Haleakala	Pan-STARRS 1	·	1.4 km	MPC · JPL
793150	2000 SX_{384}	—	September 29, 2008	Mount Lemmon	Mount Lemmon Survey	NYS	1.1 km	MPC · JPL
793151	2000 SY_{386}	—	September 26, 2000	Sacramento Peak	SDSS	·	2.0 km	MPC · JPL
793152	2000 TE_{32}	—	October 4, 2000	Kitt Peak	Spacewatch	·	2.5 km	MPC · JPL
793153	2000 TA_{77}	—	September 16, 2004	Siding Spring	SSS	·	1.6 km	MPC · JPL
793154	2000 TS_{78}	—	September 22, 2011	Kitt Peak	Spacewatch	HYG	1.7 km	MPC · JPL
793155	2000 TA_{82}	—	October 29, 2005	Mount Lemmon	Mount Lemmon Survey	·	1.6 km	MPC · JPL
793156	2000 TM_{82}	—	October 5, 2000	Kitt Peak	Spacewatch	·	2.3 km	MPC · JPL
793157	2000 WU_{2}	—	November 26, 2000	Kitt Peak	Spacewatch	·	1.1 km	MPC · JPL
793158	2000 WN_{198}	—	November 21, 2017	Haleakala	Pan-STARRS 1	·	2.4 km	MPC · JPL
793159	2000 WE_{201}	—	October 23, 2011	Haleakala	Pan-STARRS 1	·	1.9 km	MPC · JPL
793160	2000 XC_{56}	—	April 8, 2006	Mount Lemmon	Mount Lemmon Survey	(5)	1 km	MPC · JPL
793161	2000 XJ_{56}	—	August 8, 2016	Haleakala	Pan-STARRS 1	·	2.1 km	MPC · JPL
793162	2000 XN_{56}	—	October 24, 2013	Mount Lemmon	Mount Lemmon Survey	·	1 km	MPC · JPL
793163	2001 DB_{118}	—	March 25, 2014	Kitt Peak	Spacewatch	·	1.1 km	MPC · JPL
793164	2001 DD_{119}	—	December 23, 2017	Haleakala	Pan-STARRS 1	·	2.2 km	MPC · JPL
793165	2001 DS_{119}	—	December 10, 2010	Mount Lemmon	Mount Lemmon Survey	·	1.4 km	MPC · JPL
793166	2001 FO_{207}	—	March 21, 2001	Kitt Peak	SKADS	·	1.4 km	MPC · JPL
793167	2001 FM_{208}	—	March 21, 2001	Kitt Peak	SKADS	·	1.4 km	MPC · JPL
793168	2001 FP_{245}	—	March 19, 2001	Sacramento Peak	SDSS	·	2.1 km	MPC · JPL
793169	2001 FV_{246}	—	August 23, 2003	Palomar Mountain	NEAT	·	1.4 km	MPC · JPL
793170	2001 FU_{247}	—	February 28, 2012	Haleakala	Pan-STARRS 1	·	2.0 km	MPC · JPL
793171	2001 KS_{82}	—	April 27, 2011	Kitt Peak	Spacewatch	·	730 m	MPC · JPL
793172	2001 KH_{83}	—	September 9, 2015	Haleakala	Pan-STARRS 1	EUN	780 m	MPC · JPL
793173	2001 KB_{85}	—	January 14, 2016	Haleakala	Pan-STARRS 1	·	1.5 km	MPC · JPL
793174	2001 KT_{85}	—	May 16, 2012	Mount Lemmon	Mount Lemmon Survey	EOS	1.4 km	MPC · JPL
793175	2001 KR_{89}	—	October 13, 2015	Mount Lemmon	Mount Lemmon Survey	·	640 m	MPC · JPL
793176	2001 NW_{13}	—	July 13, 2001	Palomar Mountain	NEAT	·	990 m	MPC · JPL
793177	2001 QX_{106}	—	August 22, 2001	Socorro	LINEAR	·	1.0 km	MPC · JPL
793178	2001 QE_{213}	—	August 23, 2001	Anderson Mesa	LONEOS	·	860 m	MPC · JPL
793179	2001 QE_{237}	—	August 24, 2001	Socorro	LINEAR	(5)	990 m	MPC · JPL
793180	2001 QB_{299}	—	August 19, 2001	Cerro Tololo	Deep Ecliptic Survey	·	1.5 km	MPC · JPL
793181	2001 QE_{300}	—	August 19, 2001	Cerro Tololo	Deep Ecliptic Survey	·	1.3 km	MPC · JPL
793182	2001 QE_{301}	—	August 19, 2001	Cerro Tololo	Deep Ecliptic Survey	·	850 m	MPC · JPL
793183	2001 QY_{303}	—	August 19, 2001	Cerro Tololo	Deep Ecliptic Survey	·	990 m	MPC · JPL
793184	2001 QQ_{309}	—	August 19, 2001	Cerro Tololo	Deep Ecliptic Survey	AGN	890 m	MPC · JPL
793185	2001 QN_{310}	—	August 19, 2001	Cerro Tololo	Deep Ecliptic Survey	·	850 m	MPC · JPL
793186	2001 QU_{316}	—	August 20, 2001	Cerro Tololo	Deep Ecliptic Survey	EOS	1.3 km	MPC · JPL
793187	2001 QM_{339}	—	August 24, 2001	Kitt Peak	Spacewatch	(5)	1.0 km	MPC · JPL
793188	2001 RL_{47}	—	August 1, 2001	Palomar Mountain	NEAT	·	1.4 km	MPC · JPL
793189	2001 RR_{158}	—	September 12, 2001	Kitt Peak	Deep Ecliptic Survey	centaur	10 km	MPC · JPL
793190	2001 SK_{112}	—	August 22, 2001	Kitt Peak	Spacewatch	H	510 m	MPC · JPL
793191	2001 SK_{184}	—	September 19, 2001	Socorro	LINEAR	ERI	870 m	MPC · JPL
793192	2001 SN_{248}	—	September 19, 2001	Socorro	LINEAR	·	1.2 km	MPC · JPL
793193	2001 SP_{328}	—	August 15, 2001	Haleakala	NEAT	(5)	1.0 km	MPC · JPL
793194	2001 SF_{331}	—	September 19, 2001	Socorro	LINEAR	·	1.1 km	MPC · JPL
793195	2001 SY_{352}	—	August 26, 2012	Haleakala	Pan-STARRS 1	·	880 m	MPC · JPL
793196	2001 SO_{359}	—	June 8, 2016	Haleakala	Pan-STARRS 1	·	1.5 km	MPC · JPL
793197	2001 TO_{1}	—	October 11, 2001	Eskridge	G. Hug	·	1.5 km	MPC · JPL
793198	2001 TS_{81}	—	September 10, 2001	Socorro	LINEAR	·	950 m	MPC · JPL
793199	2001 TH_{102}	—	October 15, 2001	Socorro	LINEAR	·	1.4 km	MPC · JPL
793200	2001 TZ_{159}	—	September 21, 2001	Socorro	LINEAR	·	1.2 km	MPC · JPL

== 793201–793300 ==
back to top

Designation			Discovery			Properties		Ref
Permanent	Provisional	Named after	Date	Site	Discoverer(s)	Category	Diam.	Ref
793201	2001 TU_{261}	—	October 15, 2001	Palomar Mountain	NEAT	·	2.6 km	MPC · JPL
793202	2001 TV_{262}	—	October 24, 2001	Palomar Mountain	NEAT	·	2.4 km	MPC · JPL
793203	2001 TO_{263}	—	October 15, 2001	Palomar Mountain	NEAT	·	1.1 km	MPC · JPL
793204	2001 TP_{266}	—	October 31, 2014	Mount Lemmon	Mount Lemmon Survey	·	1.1 km	MPC · JPL
793205	2001 TB_{270}	—	October 14, 2001	Sacramento Peak	SDSS	·	1.4 km	MPC · JPL
793206	2001 UB_{4}	—	October 19, 2001	Palomar Mountain	NEAT	H	430 m	MPC · JPL
793207	2001 UB_{75}	—	October 17, 2001	Socorro	LINEAR	·	1.4 km	MPC · JPL
793208	2001 UL_{235}	—	November 12, 2012	Mount Lemmon	Mount Lemmon Survey	·	1.8 km	MPC · JPL
793209	2001 UB_{239}	—	October 21, 2012	Kitt Peak	Spacewatch	·	1.7 km	MPC · JPL
793210	2001 UL_{240}	—	August 29, 2005	Kitt Peak	Spacewatch	·	1.1 km	MPC · JPL
793211	2001 VY_{83}	—	September 20, 2001	Socorro	LINEAR	·	2.4 km	MPC · JPL
793212	2001 VE_{135}	—	November 12, 2001	Sacramento Peak	SDSS	EOS	1.3 km	MPC · JPL
793213	2001 VS_{138}	—	November 11, 2001	Sacramento Peak	SDSS	·	990 m	MPC · JPL
793214	2001 WJ_{68}	—	October 17, 2001	Kitt Peak	Spacewatch	·	1.0 km	MPC · JPL
793215	2001 WS_{72}	—	November 20, 2001	Socorro	LINEAR	·	740 m	MPC · JPL
793216	2001 XO_{49}	—	November 11, 2001	Socorro	LINEAR	H	340 m	MPC · JPL
793217	2001 XU_{230}	—	December 15, 2001	Socorro	LINEAR	·	1.0 km	MPC · JPL
793218	2001 XR_{266}	—	December 13, 2001	La Silla	Barbieri, C.	·	1.5 km	MPC · JPL
793219	2001 YJ_{8}	—	December 17, 2001	Socorro	LINEAR	·	2.5 km	MPC · JPL
793220	2001 YK_{164}	—	December 12, 2012	Mount Lemmon	Mount Lemmon Survey	LIX	1.9 km	MPC · JPL
793221	2002 AV_{45}	—	January 9, 2002	Socorro	LINEAR	·	1.1 km	MPC · JPL
793222	2002 AY_{99}	—	January 8, 2002	Socorro	LINEAR	·	790 m	MPC · JPL
793223	2002 AX_{213}	—	January 14, 2002	Palomar Mountain	NEAT	·	2.2 km	MPC · JPL
793224	2002 AA_{216}	—	October 27, 2017	Mount Lemmon	Mount Lemmon Survey	·	2.0 km	MPC · JPL
793225	2002 CV_{79}	—	February 7, 2002	Socorro	LINEAR	·	1.2 km	MPC · JPL
793226	2002 CL_{197}	—	February 7, 2002	Kitt Peak	Spacewatch	HNS	830 m	MPC · JPL
793227	2002 CO_{255}	—	February 6, 2002	Kitt Peak	Spacewatch	·	680 m	MPC · JPL
793228	2002 CT_{266}	—	February 7, 2002	Kitt Peak	Spacewatch	·	2.0 km	MPC · JPL
793229	2002 CL_{276}	—	February 7, 2002	Palomar Mountain	NEAT	·	1.2 km	MPC · JPL
793230	2002 CV_{315}	—	February 13, 2002	Kitt Peak	Spacewatch	·	1.8 km	MPC · JPL
793231	2002 CW_{321}	—	February 13, 2002	Sacramento Peak	SDSS	·	2.6 km	MPC · JPL
793232	2002 CX_{322}	—	May 24, 2015	Haleakala	Pan-STARRS 1	·	2.4 km	MPC · JPL
793233	2002 CY_{322}	—	November 27, 2014	Haleakala	Pan-STARRS 1	·	480 m	MPC · JPL
793234	2002 CC_{325}	—	February 10, 2013	Haleakala	Pan-STARRS 1	·	2.6 km	MPC · JPL
793235	2002 CE_{325}	—	February 26, 2016	Haleakala	Pan-STARRS 1	H	470 m	MPC · JPL
793236	2002 CM_{325}	—	April 5, 2014	Haleakala	Pan-STARRS 1	LIX	2.2 km	MPC · JPL
793237	2002 CQ_{325}	—	February 13, 2002	Sacramento Peak	SDSS	·	2.0 km	MPC · JPL
793238	2002 CV_{329}	—	February 13, 2002	Sacramento Peak	SDSS	·	1.3 km	MPC · JPL
793239	2002 DE_{12}	—	February 11, 2002	Socorro	LINEAR	THB	2.1 km	MPC · JPL
793240	2002 DE_{22}	—	October 5, 2013	Haleakala	Pan-STARRS 1	AGN	820 m	MPC · JPL
793241	2002 EE_{122}	—	March 12, 2002	Palomar Mountain	NEAT	DOR	1.7 km	MPC · JPL
793242	2002 EP_{164}	—	February 8, 2002	Kitt Peak	Deep Ecliptic Survey	·	1.9 km	MPC · JPL
793243	2002 EM_{172}	—	September 23, 2015	Haleakala	Pan-STARRS 1	·	2.7 km	MPC · JPL
793244	2002 FV_{19}	—	March 18, 2002	Kitt Peak	Deep Ecliptic Survey	·	1.4 km	MPC · JPL
793245	2002 FO_{23}	—	March 21, 2002	Kitt Peak	Spacewatch	·	2.1 km	MPC · JPL
793246	2002 FP_{42}	—	September 21, 2008	Mount Lemmon	Mount Lemmon Survey	(5)	680 m	MPC · JPL
793247	2002 FW_{43}	—	February 14, 2013	Haleakala	Pan-STARRS 1	THM	2.0 km	MPC · JPL
793248	2002 FP_{44}	—	March 21, 2002	Kitt Peak	Spacewatch	·	1.3 km	MPC · JPL
793249	2002 GK_{28}	—	April 6, 2002	Cerro Tololo	Deep Ecliptic Survey	·	630 m	MPC · JPL
793250	2002 GN_{51}	—	April 5, 2002	Palomar Mountain	NEAT	·	1.2 km	MPC · JPL
793251	2002 GF_{57}	—	April 8, 2002	Kitt Peak	Spacewatch	EUP	2.3 km	MPC · JPL
793252	2002 GJ_{156}	—	April 13, 2002	Palomar Mountain	NEAT	·	580 m	MPC · JPL
793253	2002 GC_{158}	—	April 13, 2002	Palomar Mountain	NEAT	·	880 m	MPC · JPL
793254	2002 GL_{186}	—	May 4, 2002	Kitt Peak	Spacewatch	·	930 m	MPC · JPL
793255	2002 GU_{190}	—	April 27, 2008	Mount Lemmon	Mount Lemmon Survey	·	2.7 km	MPC · JPL
793256	2002 GA_{195}	—	November 9, 2013	Mount Lemmon	Mount Lemmon Survey	·	1.3 km	MPC · JPL
793257	2002 GR_{195}	—	April 8, 2002	Palomar Mountain	NEAT	·	1.5 km	MPC · JPL
793258	2002 GY_{197}	—	April 4, 2002	Palomar Mountain	NEAT	EUN	880 m	MPC · JPL
793259	2002 HA_{19}	—	July 12, 2013	Haleakala	Pan-STARRS 1	EOS	1.3 km	MPC · JPL
793260	2002 MF_{7}	—	July 17, 2002	Palomar Mountain	NEAT	·	1.2 km	MPC · JPL
793261	2002 NZ_{67}	—	July 14, 2002	Palomar Mountain	NEAT	·	1.2 km	MPC · JPL
793262	2002 NN_{80}	—	October 8, 2002	Bergisch Gladbach	W. Bickel	EUP	3.1 km	MPC · JPL
793263	2002 NW_{80}	—	December 29, 2011	Kitt Peak	Spacewatch	·	1.1 km	MPC · JPL
793264	2002 OT_{28}	—	July 23, 2002	Palomar Mountain	NEAT	·	550 m	MPC · JPL
793265	2002 OP_{31}	—	July 17, 2002	Palomar Mountain	NEAT	·	2.6 km	MPC · JPL
793266	2002 OM_{35}	—	July 29, 2009	Kitt Peak	Spacewatch	·	540 m	MPC · JPL
793267	2002 OX_{37}	—	August 5, 2002	Palomar Mountain	NEAT	·	2.5 km	MPC · JPL
793268	2002 PT_{130}	—	August 13, 2002	Socorro	LINEAR	·	520 m	MPC · JPL
793269	2002 PQ_{143}	—	August 9, 2002	Cerro Tololo	Deep Ecliptic Survey	·	1.1 km	MPC · JPL
793270	2002 PJ_{146}	—	August 9, 2002	Cerro Tololo	Deep Ecliptic Survey	KOR	960 m	MPC · JPL
793271	2002 PL_{147}	—	August 9, 2002	Cerro Tololo	Deep Ecliptic Survey	·	1.2 km	MPC · JPL
793272	2002 PP_{147}	—	August 10, 2002	Cerro Tololo	Deep Ecliptic Survey	EOS	1.6 km	MPC · JPL
793273	2002 PV_{148}	—	August 10, 2002	Cerro Tololo	Deep Ecliptic Survey	·	730 m	MPC · JPL
793274	2002 PJ_{172}	—	August 27, 2002	Palomar Mountain	NEAT	·	700 m	MPC · JPL
793275	2002 PR_{184}	—	October 21, 2006	Kitt Peak	Spacewatch	·	760 m	MPC · JPL
793276	2002 PZ_{185}	—	October 18, 2006	Kitt Peak	Spacewatch	·	790 m	MPC · JPL
793277	2002 PP_{196}	—	August 11, 2002	Palomar Mountain	NEAT	·	900 m	MPC · JPL
793278	2002 PZ_{200}	—	August 8, 2002	Palomar Mountain	NEAT	·	860 m	MPC · JPL
793279	2002 PO_{201}	—	August 7, 2002	Palomar Mountain	NEAT	·	1.5 km	MPC · JPL
793280	2002 PZ_{202}	—	May 4, 2006	Mount Lemmon	Mount Lemmon Survey	·	1.3 km	MPC · JPL
793281	2002 QR_{10}	—	August 17, 2002	Palomar Mountain	NEAT	·	960 m	MPC · JPL
793282	2002 QW_{61}	—	August 28, 2002	Palomar Mountain	NEAT	·	1.3 km	MPC · JPL
793283	2002 QX_{61}	—	August 28, 2002	Palomar Mountain	NEAT	·	860 m	MPC · JPL
793284	2002 QU_{74}	—	August 29, 2002	Palomar Mountain	NEAT	·	840 m	MPC · JPL
793285	2002 QX_{74}	—	August 19, 2002	Palomar Mountain	NEAT	·	1.1 km	MPC · JPL
793286	2002 QY_{79}	—	August 16, 2002	Palomar Mountain	NEAT	·	1.8 km	MPC · JPL
793287	2002 QX_{80}	—	August 19, 2002	Palomar Mountain	NEAT	(5)	960 m	MPC · JPL
793288	2002 QA_{97}	—	August 18, 2002	Palomar Mountain	NEAT	·	1.2 km	MPC · JPL
793289	2002 QH_{103}	—	August 29, 2002	Palomar Mountain	NEAT	·	1.4 km	MPC · JPL
793290	2002 QY_{112}	—	August 27, 2002	Palomar Mountain	NEAT	VER	2.1 km	MPC · JPL
793291	2002 QO_{117}	—	August 16, 2002	Palomar Mountain	NEAT	·	970 m	MPC · JPL
793292	2002 QG_{120}	—	August 30, 2002	Palomar Mountain	NEAT	·	1.2 km	MPC · JPL
793293	2002 QN_{141}	—	August 27, 2002	Palomar Mountain	NEAT	·	1.8 km	MPC · JPL
793294	2002 QL_{142}	—	August 27, 2002	Palomar Mountain	NEAT	PHO	770 m	MPC · JPL
793295	2002 QM_{154}	—	August 17, 2002	Palomar Mountain	NEAT	·	1.5 km	MPC · JPL
793296	2002 QA_{160}	—	April 29, 2014	Haleakala	Pan-STARRS 1	·	930 m	MPC · JPL
793297	2002 RD_{27}	—	September 5, 2002	Socorro	LINEAR	AMO +1km	840 m	MPC · JPL
793298	2002 RS_{132}	—	September 5, 2002	Anderson Mesa	LONEOS	JUN	710 m	MPC · JPL
793299	2002 RB_{169}	—	September 13, 2002	Palomar Mountain	NEAT	·	1.1 km	MPC · JPL
793300	2002 RW_{195}	—	September 12, 2002	Palomar Mountain	NEAT	·	1.2 km	MPC · JPL

== 793301–793400 ==
back to top

Designation			Discovery			Properties		Ref
Permanent	Provisional	Named after	Date	Site	Discoverer(s)	Category	Diam.	Ref
793301	2002 RT_{238}	—	September 15, 2002	Palomar Mountain	NEAT	·	1.3 km	MPC · JPL
793302	2002 RD_{247}	—	September 15, 2002	Palomar Mountain	NEAT	·	2.0 km	MPC · JPL
793303	2002 RT_{257}	—	September 14, 2002	Palomar Mountain	NEAT	·	1.5 km	MPC · JPL
793304	2002 RX_{257}	—	September 14, 2002	Palomar Mountain	NEAT	·	740 m	MPC · JPL
793305	2002 RT_{258}	—	September 14, 2002	Palomar Mountain	NEAT	·	930 m	MPC · JPL
793306	2002 RD_{261}	—	September 11, 2002	Palomar Mountain	NEAT	·	1.8 km	MPC · JPL
793307	2002 RH_{265}	—	September 15, 2002	Palomar Mountain	NEAT	·	1.6 km	MPC · JPL
793308	2002 RU_{266}	—	September 13, 2002	Palomar Mountain	NEAT	·	1.9 km	MPC · JPL
793309	2002 RD_{267}	—	September 14, 2002	Palomar Mountain	NEAT	·	1.3 km	MPC · JPL
793310	2002 RN_{269}	—	September 4, 2002	Palomar Mountain	NEAT	·	2.3 km	MPC · JPL
793311	2002 RS_{269}	—	September 4, 2002	Palomar Mountain	NEAT	·	1.3 km	MPC · JPL
793312	2002 RM_{274}	—	September 4, 2002	Palomar Mountain	NEAT	·	1.8 km	MPC · JPL
793313	2002 RC_{277}	—	September 14, 2002	Palomar Mountain	NEAT	·	810 m	MPC · JPL
793314	2002 RD_{277}	—	September 14, 2002	Palomar Mountain	NEAT	·	1.1 km	MPC · JPL
793315	2002 RR_{284}	—	September 12, 2002	Palomar Mountain	NEAT	EOS	1.3 km	MPC · JPL
793316	2002 RB_{286}	—	September 28, 2010	Puebla de Don Fadrique	OAM	H	440 m	MPC · JPL
793317	2002 RY_{292}	—	September 4, 2002	Palomar Mountain	NEAT	·	1.3 km	MPC · JPL
793318	2002 RO_{293}	—	September 3, 2002	Palomar Mountain	NEAT	·	940 m	MPC · JPL
793319	2002 SX_{47}	—	September 30, 2002	Socorro	LINEAR	·	590 m	MPC · JPL
793320	2002 SE_{63}	—	September 16, 2002	Palomar Mountain	NEAT	·	1.9 km	MPC · JPL
793321	2002 ST_{64}	—	September 28, 2002	Palomar Mountain	NEAT	H	470 m	MPC · JPL
793322	2002 SL_{66}	—	September 16, 2002	Palomar Mountain	NEAT	·	1.2 km	MPC · JPL
793323	2002 SG_{69}	—	September 26, 2002	Palomar Mountain	NEAT	·	2.2 km	MPC · JPL
793324	2002 SN_{69}	—	October 10, 2002	Sacramento Peak	SDSS	·	1.3 km	MPC · JPL
793325	2002 SS_{75}	—	September 30, 2002	Palomar Mountain	NEAT	PHO	770 m	MPC · JPL
793326	2002 TZ_{67}	—	August 1, 2002	Socorro	LINEAR	·	980 m	MPC · JPL
793327	2002 TO_{151}	—	October 5, 2002	Palomar Mountain	NEAT	·	1.0 km	MPC · JPL
793328	2002 TE_{216}	—	October 5, 2002	Palomar Mountain	NEAT	·	1.2 km	MPC · JPL
793329	2002 TG_{232}	—	September 3, 2002	Palomar Mountain	NEAT	·	2.0 km	MPC · JPL
793330	2002 TM_{300}	—	October 15, 2002	Palomar Mountain	NEAT	·	1.1 km	MPC · JPL
793331	2002 TH_{381}	—	October 6, 2002	Palomar Mountain	NEAT	·	1.7 km	MPC · JPL
793332	2002 TE_{382}	—	October 10, 2015	Haleakala	Pan-STARRS 1	·	860 m	MPC · JPL
793333	2002 TZ_{390}	—	January 25, 2015	Haleakala	Pan-STARRS 1	·	1.8 km	MPC · JPL
793334	2002 TA_{394}	—	October 15, 2002	Palomar Mountain	NEAT	·	970 m	MPC · JPL
793335	2002 UN_{35}	—	October 31, 2002	Palomar Mountain	NEAT	·	1.3 km	MPC · JPL
793336	2002 VC_{122}	—	November 13, 2002	Palomar Mountain	NEAT	·	1.3 km	MPC · JPL
793337	2002 VT_{152}	—	October 22, 2008	Kitt Peak	Spacewatch	·	2.5 km	MPC · JPL
793338	2002 VP_{153}	—	September 15, 2017	Haleakala	Pan-STARRS 1	·	1.2 km	MPC · JPL
793339	2002 WW	—	October 10, 2002	Palomar Mountain	NEAT	·	1.2 km	MPC · JPL
793340	2002 WH_{1}	—	November 16, 2002	Palomar Mountain	NEAT	·	1.8 km	MPC · JPL
793341	2002 WH_{2}	—	October 31, 2002	Kitt Peak	Spacewatch	·	550 m	MPC · JPL
793342	2002 WY_{20}	—	November 24, 2002	Palomar Mountain	NEAT	·	1.3 km	MPC · JPL
793343	2002 WW_{23}	—	November 16, 2002	Palomar Mountain	NEAT	·	930 m	MPC · JPL
793344	2002 WQ_{27}	—	November 23, 2002	Palomar Mountain	NEAT	·	1.1 km	MPC · JPL
793345	2002 XC_{8}	—	December 2, 2002	Socorro	LINEAR	·	1.6 km	MPC · JPL
793346	2002 XL_{45}	—	December 5, 2002	Socorro	LINEAR	H	440 m	MPC · JPL
793347	2002 XQ_{121}	—	March 10, 2005	Mount Lemmon	Mount Lemmon Survey	3:2 · SHU	3.9 km	MPC · JPL
793348	2002 YB_{37}	—	February 24, 2014	Haleakala	Pan-STARRS 1	·	1.6 km	MPC · JPL
793349	2003 AY_{2}	—	January 2, 2003	Anderson Mesa	LONEOS	APO · PHA	390 m	MPC · JPL
793350	2003 AP_{71}	—	December 28, 2002	Kitt Peak	Spacewatch	·	630 m	MPC · JPL
793351	2003 BK_{46}	—	January 28, 2003	Socorro	LINEAR	H	490 m	MPC · JPL
793352	2003 BO_{94}	—	January 25, 2003	Palomar Mountain	NEAT	·	1.6 km	MPC · JPL
793353	2003 BC_{100}	—	October 21, 2017	Mount Lemmon	Mount Lemmon Survey	·	1.5 km	MPC · JPL
793354	2003 BL_{101}	—	January 28, 2017	Haleakala	Pan-STARRS 1	·	1.4 km	MPC · JPL
793355	2003 BN_{101}	—	November 16, 2017	Mount Lemmon	Mount Lemmon Survey	·	1.5 km	MPC · JPL
793356	2003 BX_{101}	—	October 12, 2007	Mount Lemmon	Mount Lemmon Survey	·	2.9 km	MPC · JPL
793357	2003 BS_{102}	—	October 19, 2007	Mount Lemmon	Mount Lemmon Survey	·	1.7 km	MPC · JPL
793358	2003 BC_{103}	—	September 30, 2017	Haleakala	Pan-STARRS 1	EOS	1.2 km	MPC · JPL
793359	2003 CM_{23}	—	February 4, 2003	La Silla	Barbieri, C.	(7744)	1.0 km	MPC · JPL
793360	2003 CZ_{23}	—	February 4, 2003	La Silla	Barbieri, C.	·	1.6 km	MPC · JPL
793361	2003 CV_{27}	—	July 30, 2017	Haleakala	Pan-STARRS 1	·	2.0 km	MPC · JPL
793362	2003 DW_{25}	—	February 21, 2003	Palomar Mountain	NEAT	T_{j} (2.98)	2.0 km	MPC · JPL
793363	2003 EW_{54}	—	March 7, 2003	Kitt Peak	Deep Lens Survey	·	830 m	MPC · JPL
793364	2003 EA_{65}	—	April 7, 2014	Mount Lemmon	Mount Lemmon Survey	TIR	1.6 km	MPC · JPL
793365	2003 EN_{65}	—	March 10, 2003	Campo Imperatore	CINEOS	T_{j} (2.95)	1.8 km	MPC · JPL
793366	2003 FV_{122}	—	March 31, 2003	Cerro Tololo	Deep Lens Survey	·	1.8 km	MPC · JPL
793367	2003 FD_{139}	—	January 13, 2008	Kitt Peak	Spacewatch	·	1.8 km	MPC · JPL
793368	2003 FE_{140}	—	March 24, 2014	Haleakala	Pan-STARRS 1	·	1.9 km	MPC · JPL
793369	2003 FM_{141}	—	March 24, 2003	Sacramento Peak	SDSS	·	2.0 km	MPC · JPL
793370	2003 FA_{142}	—	March 23, 2003	Sacramento Peak	SDSS	·	1.1 km	MPC · JPL
793371	2003 GX_{18}	—	April 4, 2003	Kitt Peak	Spacewatch	EUP	2.0 km	MPC · JPL
793372	2003 GB_{33}	—	April 1, 2003	Cerro Tololo	Deep Lens Survey	·	1.7 km	MPC · JPL
793373	2003 GU_{60}	—	August 30, 2016	Mount Lemmon	Mount Lemmon Survey	H	330 m	MPC · JPL
793374	2003 GN_{61}	—	April 1, 2003	Sacramento Peak	SDSS	·	850 m	MPC · JPL
793375	2003 GN_{63}	—	January 26, 2011	Kitt Peak	Spacewatch	·	1.1 km	MPC · JPL
793376	2003 GQ_{63}	—	April 29, 2014	Haleakala	Pan-STARRS 1	·	1.8 km	MPC · JPL
793377	2003 GL_{65}	—	April 14, 2008	Kitt Peak	Spacewatch	·	1.4 km	MPC · JPL
793378	2003 GO_{66}	—	April 1, 2003	Sacramento Peak	SDSS	·	1.6 km	MPC · JPL
793379	2003 GE_{67}	—	April 1, 2003	Sacramento Peak	SDSS	·	2.2 km	MPC · JPL
793380	2003 GH_{67}	—	April 1, 2003	Sacramento Peak	SDSS	·	2.2 km	MPC · JPL
793381	2003 HT_{4}	—	April 24, 2003	Kitt Peak	Spacewatch	critical	970 m	MPC · JPL
793382	2003 HD_{60}	—	October 17, 2006	Kitt Peak	Spacewatch	H	270 m	MPC · JPL
793383	2003 HK_{61}	—	July 22, 1995	Kitt Peak	Spacewatch	ADE	1.4 km	MPC · JPL
793384	2003 JN_{14}	—	May 8, 2003	Socorro	LINEAR	APO	430 m	MPC · JPL
793385	2003 JU_{19}	—	May 10, 2003	Kitt Peak	Spacewatch	·	1.7 km	MPC · JPL
793386	2003 JJ_{21}	—	May 6, 2003	Kitt Peak	Spacewatch	·	1.9 km	MPC · JPL
793387	2003 KV_{8}	—	May 25, 2003	Kitt Peak	Spacewatch	(18466)	1.6 km	MPC · JPL
793388	2003 KX_{23}	—	May 30, 2003	Cerro Tololo	Deep Ecliptic Survey	L4	5.6 km	MPC · JPL
793389	2003 KM_{24}	—	May 6, 2003	Kitt Peak	Spacewatch	·	1.5 km	MPC · JPL
793390	2003 KK_{40}	—	May 26, 2003	Kitt Peak	Spacewatch	TIR	2.2 km	MPC · JPL
793391	2003 LA_{5}	—	June 2, 2003	Nogales	P. R. Holvorcem, M. Schwartz	T_{j} (2.98)	1.5 km	MPC · JPL
793392	2003 LQ_{11}	—	August 27, 2011	Haleakala	Pan-STARRS 1	·	1.0 km	MPC · JPL
793393	2003 LX_{11}	—	May 9, 2014	Haleakala	Pan-STARRS 1	THM	1.5 km	MPC · JPL
793394	2003 NS_{14}	—	May 19, 2018	Haleakala	Pan-STARRS 1	·	1.1 km	MPC · JPL
793395	2003 OO_{14}	—	July 22, 2003	Palomar Mountain	NEAT	·	1.7 km	MPC · JPL
793396	2003 OQ_{24}	—	July 26, 2003	Palomar Mountain	NEAT	·	1.4 km	MPC · JPL
793397	2003 PX_{13}	—	August 4, 2003	Kitt Peak	Spacewatch	·	880 m	MPC · JPL
793398	2003 QT_{82}	—	August 24, 2003	Cerro Tololo	Deep Ecliptic Survey	·	1.2 km	MPC · JPL
793399	2003 QJ_{121}	—	May 18, 2013	Mount Lemmon	Mount Lemmon Survey	·	540 m	MPC · JPL
793400	2003 QN_{121}	—	January 21, 2012	Kitt Peak	Spacewatch	·	2.0 km	MPC · JPL

== 793401–793500 ==
back to top

Designation			Discovery			Properties		Ref
Permanent	Provisional	Named after	Date	Site	Discoverer(s)	Category	Diam.	Ref
793401	2003 QX_{121}	—	November 27, 2013	Kitt Peak	Spacewatch	·	1.4 km	MPC · JPL
793402	2003 QZ_{121}	—	February 10, 2016	Mount Lemmon	Mount Lemmon Survey	·	1.3 km	MPC · JPL
793403	2003 QX_{123}	—	August 14, 2012	Siding Spring	SSS	·	1.1 km	MPC · JPL
793404	2003 QZ_{123}	—	December 22, 2012	Haleakala	Pan-STARRS 1	T_{j} (2.93) · 3:2	4.2 km	MPC · JPL
793405	2003 QA_{125}	—	August 28, 2003	Palomar Mountain	NEAT	·	990 m	MPC · JPL
793406	2003 QA_{127}	—	August 26, 2003	Cerro Tololo	Deep Ecliptic Survey	·	1.5 km	MPC · JPL
793407	2003 SO_{29}	—	September 18, 2003	Palomar Mountain	NEAT	KON	1.6 km	MPC · JPL
793408	2003 SH_{36}	—	September 19, 2003	Palomar Mountain	NEAT	·	480 m	MPC · JPL
793409	2003 SM_{71}	—	August 21, 2003	Campo Imperatore	CINEOS	·	870 m	MPC · JPL
793410	2003 SE_{77}	—	September 19, 2003	Kitt Peak	Spacewatch	DOR	1.6 km	MPC · JPL
793411	2003 SR_{118}	—	September 16, 2003	Kitt Peak	Spacewatch	MRX	660 m	MPC · JPL
793412	2003 SG_{130}	—	September 19, 2003	Kitt Peak	Spacewatch	PHO	840 m	MPC · JPL
793413	2003 SN_{135}	—	October 17, 2012	Haleakala	Pan-STARRS 1	·	990 m	MPC · JPL
793414	2003 SU_{151}	—	September 18, 2003	Palomar Mountain	NEAT	(5)	1.1 km	MPC · JPL
793415	2003 SK_{209}	—	September 18, 2003	Palomar Mountain	NEAT	PHO	700 m	MPC · JPL
793416	2003 SJ_{262}	—	September 27, 2003	Kitt Peak	Spacewatch	·	1.3 km	MPC · JPL
793417	2003 SB_{337}	—	September 16, 2003	Kitt Peak	Spacewatch	·	1.0 km	MPC · JPL
793418	2003 SK_{354}	—	September 22, 2003	Palomar Mountain	NEAT	BAR	850 m	MPC · JPL
793419	2003 SN_{355}	—	September 25, 2003	Palomar Mountain	NEAT	BRG	1.2 km	MPC · JPL
793420	2003 SD_{364}	—	September 26, 2003	Sacramento Peak	SDSS	·	950 m	MPC · JPL
793421	2003 SK_{366}	—	September 17, 2003	Kitt Peak	Spacewatch	HOF	1.7 km	MPC · JPL
793422	2003 SL_{376}	—	September 26, 2003	Sacramento Peak	SDSS	·	2.2 km	MPC · JPL
793423	2003 SS_{384}	—	September 26, 2003	Sacramento Peak	SDSS	·	1.3 km	MPC · JPL
793424	2003 SM_{386}	—	October 2, 2003	Kitt Peak	Spacewatch	·	1.8 km	MPC · JPL
793425	2003 ST_{386}	—	October 2, 2003	Kitt Peak	Spacewatch	·	1.4 km	MPC · JPL
793426	2003 SY_{386}	—	September 26, 2003	Sacramento Peak	SDSS	·	1.1 km	MPC · JPL
793427	2003 SK_{388}	—	September 26, 2003	Sacramento Peak	SDSS	·	670 m	MPC · JPL
793428	2003 SU_{415}	—	September 30, 2003	Kitt Peak	Spacewatch	DOR	1.5 km	MPC · JPL
793429	2003 SM_{417}	—	September 28, 2003	Sacramento Peak	SDSS	·	1.7 km	MPC · JPL
793430	2003 SK_{421}	—	September 30, 2003	Kitt Peak	Spacewatch	·	1.5 km	MPC · JPL
793431	2003 SM_{433}	—	September 29, 2003	Kitt Peak	Spacewatch	·	1.7 km	MPC · JPL
793432	2003 ST_{438}	—	September 19, 2003	Palomar Mountain	NEAT	·	1.9 km	MPC · JPL
793433	2003 SQ_{444}	—	April 29, 2016	Kitt Peak	Spacewatch	·	1.5 km	MPC · JPL
793434	2003 SG_{445}	—	September 26, 2003	Sacramento Peak	SDSS	HOF	1.7 km	MPC · JPL
793435	2003 SA_{446}	—	September 29, 2003	Kitt Peak	Spacewatch	·	1.5 km	MPC · JPL
793436	2003 SO_{446}	—	January 20, 2015	Haleakala	Pan-STARRS 1	·	1.5 km	MPC · JPL
793437	2003 SZ_{446}	—	September 18, 2003	Kitt Peak	Spacewatch	AGN	870 m	MPC · JPL
793438	2003 SQ_{447}	—	April 16, 2016	Haleakala	Pan-STARRS 1	·	1.6 km	MPC · JPL
793439	2003 ST_{448}	—	September 16, 2003	Kitt Peak	Spacewatch	·	610 m	MPC · JPL
793440	2003 SS_{450}	—	October 5, 2003	Kitt Peak	Spacewatch	·	750 m	MPC · JPL
793441	2003 SM_{453}	—	September 19, 2003	Kitt Peak	Spacewatch	·	510 m	MPC · JPL
793442	2003 SR_{459}	—	September 28, 2003	Kitt Peak	Spacewatch	·	2.0 km	MPC · JPL
793443	2003 SV_{461}	—	February 25, 2011	Mount Lemmon	Mount Lemmon Survey	EOS	1.4 km	MPC · JPL
793444	2003 SX_{461}	—	February 5, 2016	Haleakala	Pan-STARRS 1	·	1.5 km	MPC · JPL
793445	2003 SR_{462}	—	August 12, 2012	Siding Spring	SSS	·	1.8 km	MPC · JPL
793446	2003 SM_{463}	—	April 27, 2012	Haleakala	Pan-STARRS 1	·	1.3 km	MPC · JPL
793447	2003 SA_{465}	—	September 19, 2003	Kitt Peak	Spacewatch	·	720 m	MPC · JPL
793448	2003 SH_{470}	—	September 20, 2003	Palomar Mountain	NEAT	·	820 m	MPC · JPL
793449	2003 SC_{474}	—	September 19, 2003	Kitt Peak	Spacewatch	·	770 m	MPC · JPL
793450	2003 SK_{475}	—	September 29, 2003	Sacramento Peak	SDSS	·	1.1 km	MPC · JPL
793451	2003 SD_{478}	—	September 19, 2003	Kitt Peak	Spacewatch	·	760 m	MPC · JPL
793452	2003 TG_{24}	—	September 19, 2003	Palomar Mountain	NEAT	·	1.1 km	MPC · JPL
793453	2003 TD_{39}	—	October 2, 2003	Kitt Peak	Spacewatch	·	1.0 km	MPC · JPL
793454	2003 TK_{52}	—	October 5, 2003	Kitt Peak	Spacewatch	EUN	620 m	MPC · JPL
793455	2003 TB_{62}	—	September 30, 2011	Mount Lemmon	Mount Lemmon Survey	H	380 m	MPC · JPL
793456	2003 TB_{66}	—	October 15, 2003	Palomar Mountain	NEAT	·	1.7 km	MPC · JPL
793457	2003 UE_{9}	—	September 29, 2003	Kitt Peak	Spacewatch	PHO	660 m	MPC · JPL
793458	2003 UK_{33}	—	October 17, 2003	Kitt Peak	Spacewatch	·	1.7 km	MPC · JPL
793459	2003 UV_{33}	—	September 30, 2003	Kitt Peak	Spacewatch	·	650 m	MPC · JPL
793460	2003 UD_{39}	—	October 16, 2003	Kitt Peak	Spacewatch	EOS	1.2 km	MPC · JPL
793461	2003 UM_{40}	—	October 16, 2003	Kitt Peak	Spacewatch	·	410 m	MPC · JPL
793462	2003 UH_{85}	—	October 9, 2012	Haleakala	Pan-STARRS 1	·	1.5 km	MPC · JPL
793463	2003 UA_{88}	—	October 19, 2003	Kitt Peak	Spacewatch	T_{j} (2.96)	1.7 km	MPC · JPL
793464	2003 UY_{285}	—	October 25, 2003	Kitt Peak	Spacewatch	·	740 m	MPC · JPL
793465	2003 UK_{286}	—	October 25, 2003	Kitt Peak	Spacewatch	KOR	840 m	MPC · JPL
793466	2003 UW_{326}	—	September 28, 2003	Kitt Peak	Spacewatch	·	1.2 km	MPC · JPL
793467	2003 UH_{332}	—	September 16, 2003	Kitt Peak	Spacewatch	·	1.3 km	MPC · JPL
793468	2003 UQ_{335}	—	September 18, 2003	Kitt Peak	Spacewatch	MRX	630 m	MPC · JPL
793469	2003 UB_{343}	—	September 30, 2003	Kitt Peak	Spacewatch	KOR	960 m	MPC · JPL
793470	2003 UA_{362}	—	October 20, 2003	Kitt Peak	Spacewatch	·	2.0 km	MPC · JPL
793471	2003 UH_{363}	—	October 20, 2003	Kitt Peak	Spacewatch	·	1.4 km	MPC · JPL
793472	2003 UB_{364}	—	October 20, 2003	Kitt Peak	Spacewatch	·	2.3 km	MPC · JPL
793473	2003 UK_{371}	—	July 23, 2003	Palomar Mountain	NEAT	·	1.0 km	MPC · JPL
793474	2003 UG_{380}	—	September 21, 2003	Kitt Peak	Spacewatch	ARM	2.3 km	MPC · JPL
793475	2003 UE_{384}	—	October 22, 2003	Sacramento Peak	SDSS	HOF	1.8 km	MPC · JPL
793476	2003 UC_{388}	—	October 22, 2003	Sacramento Peak	SDSS	·	1.6 km	MPC · JPL
793477	2003 UL_{389}	—	October 22, 2003	Sacramento Peak	SDSS	·	1.0 km	MPC · JPL
793478	2003 UO_{393}	—	October 22, 2003	Sacramento Peak	SDSS	EUN	600 m	MPC · JPL
793479	2003 UX_{394}	—	October 22, 2003	Sacramento Peak	SDSS	·	1.2 km	MPC · JPL
793480	2003 UQ_{409}	—	October 23, 2003	Sacramento Peak	SDSS	·	2.1 km	MPC · JPL
793481	2003 UR_{412}	—	January 16, 2004	Palomar Mountain	NEAT	·	2.8 km	MPC · JPL
793482	2003 UP_{427}	—	October 27, 2003	Kitt Peak	Spacewatch	·	550 m	MPC · JPL
793483	2003 UE_{429}	—	June 14, 2012	Mount Lemmon	Mount Lemmon Survey	·	1.2 km	MPC · JPL
793484	2003 UH_{431}	—	January 12, 2016	Haleakala	Pan-STARRS 1	·	2.1 km	MPC · JPL
793485	2003 UD_{435}	—	October 20, 2011	Mount Lemmon	Mount Lemmon Survey	·	860 m	MPC · JPL
793486	2003 UF_{435}	—	October 28, 2014	Haleakala	Pan-STARRS 1	·	2.3 km	MPC · JPL
793487	2003 UT_{437}	—	February 20, 2015	Haleakala	Pan-STARRS 1	·	1.7 km	MPC · JPL
793488	2003 UZ_{439}	—	August 20, 2011	Haleakala	Pan-STARRS 1	·	670 m	MPC · JPL
793489	2003 UL_{440}	—	November 21, 2003	Kitt Peak	Spacewatch	·	1.6 km	MPC · JPL
793490	2003 UO_{442}	—	August 17, 2012	Haleakala	Pan-STARRS 1	AGN	840 m	MPC · JPL
793491	2003 UW_{449}	—	October 22, 2003	Kitt Peak	Spacewatch	·	1.3 km	MPC · JPL
793492	2003 UC_{451}	—	October 23, 2003	Sacramento Peak	SDSS	EOS	1.2 km	MPC · JPL
793493	2003 VR_{5}	—	November 15, 2003	Kitt Peak	Spacewatch	·	570 m	MPC · JPL
793494	2003 WV_{48}	—	November 19, 2003	Kitt Peak	Spacewatch	·	980 m	MPC · JPL
793495	2003 WF_{179}	—	November 20, 2003	Kitt Peak	Deep Ecliptic Survey	·	1.2 km	MPC · JPL
793496	2003 WE_{205}	—	December 5, 2016	Mount Lemmon	Mount Lemmon Survey	·	440 m	MPC · JPL
793497	2003 WC_{208}	—	October 28, 2014	Haleakala	Pan-STARRS 1	·	2.2 km	MPC · JPL
793498	2003 WV_{209}	—	November 30, 2003	Kitt Peak	Spacewatch	·	1.5 km	MPC · JPL
793499	2003 WH_{212}	—	September 4, 2008	Kitt Peak	Spacewatch	THM	1.5 km	MPC · JPL
793500	2003 WP_{212}	—	September 23, 2015	Mount Lemmon	Mount Lemmon Survey	·	870 m	MPC · JPL

== 793501–793600 ==
back to top

Designation			Discovery			Properties		Ref
Permanent	Provisional	Named after	Date	Site	Discoverer(s)	Category	Diam.	Ref
793501	2003 WK_{215}	—	November 19, 2003	Palomar Mountain	NEAT	·	660 m	MPC · JPL
793502	2003 WX_{218}	—	November 21, 2003	Kitt Peak	Spacewatch	·	1.6 km	MPC · JPL
793503	2003 XG_{15}	—	December 4, 2003	Socorro	LINEAR	H	480 m	MPC · JPL
793504	2003 XV_{44}	—	May 9, 2011	Mount Lemmon	Mount Lemmon Survey	·	1.7 km	MPC · JPL
793505	2003 XT_{45}	—	June 27, 2014	Haleakala	Pan-STARRS 1	·	960 m	MPC · JPL
793506	2003 XX_{45}	—	June 18, 2018	Haleakala	Pan-STARRS 1	·	2.0 km	MPC · JPL
793507	2003 YM_{124}	—	December 28, 2003	Kitt Peak	Spacewatch	·	960 m	MPC · JPL
793508	2003 YT_{165}	—	December 17, 2003	Kitt Peak	Spacewatch	·	720 m	MPC · JPL
793509	2003 YF_{176}	—	December 16, 2003	Mauna Kea	D. D. Balam	·	1.3 km	MPC · JPL
793510	2003 YT_{176}	—	November 19, 2003	Kitt Peak	Spacewatch	THM	1.6 km	MPC · JPL
793511	2003 YB_{177}	—	December 16, 2003	Mauna Kea	D. D. Balam	·	810 m	MPC · JPL
793512	2004 AR_{14}	—	January 15, 2004	Kitt Peak	Spacewatch	·	1.3 km	MPC · JPL
793513	2004 BJ_{14}	—	January 18, 2004	Kitt Peak	Spacewatch	·	1.2 km	MPC · JPL
793514	2004 BZ_{40}	—	January 21, 2004	Socorro	LINEAR	·	670 m	MPC · JPL
793515	2004 BF_{45}	—	January 12, 2004	Palomar Mountain	NEAT	·	1 km	MPC · JPL
793516	2004 BJ_{65}	—	December 17, 2003	Kitt Peak	Spacewatch	·	920 m	MPC · JPL
793517	2004 BE_{125}	—	January 16, 2004	Kitt Peak	Spacewatch	·	1.4 km	MPC · JPL
793518	2004 BV_{131}	—	January 16, 2004	Kitt Peak	Spacewatch	(5)	720 m	MPC · JPL
793519	2004 BK_{154}	—	January 28, 2004	Kitt Peak	Spacewatch	·	860 m	MPC · JPL
793520	2004 BE_{164}	—	January 18, 2004	Palomar Mountain	NEAT	·	1.2 km	MPC · JPL
793521	2004 BC_{167}	—	January 9, 2011	Kitt Peak	Spacewatch	·	540 m	MPC · JPL
793522	2004 BN_{167}	—	January 18, 2004	Kitt Peak	Spacewatch	H	390 m	MPC · JPL
793523	2004 BJ_{168}	—	December 9, 2010	Mount Lemmon	Mount Lemmon Survey	·	580 m	MPC · JPL
793524	2004 BJ_{170}	—	November 12, 2015	Mount Lemmon	Mount Lemmon Survey	·	720 m	MPC · JPL
793525	2004 CY	—	February 11, 2004	Palomar Mountain	NEAT	·	1.5 km	MPC · JPL
793526	2004 CV_{8}	—	February 11, 2004	Kitt Peak	Spacewatch	H	420 m	MPC · JPL
793527	2004 CJ_{16}	—	February 11, 2004	Kitt Peak	Spacewatch	·	1.2 km	MPC · JPL
793528	2004 CW_{27}	—	January 19, 2004	Kitt Peak	Spacewatch	·	850 m	MPC · JPL
793529	2004 CR_{30}	—	January 16, 2004	Palomar Mountain	NEAT	·	800 m	MPC · JPL
793530	2004 CJ_{33}	—	February 12, 2004	Kitt Peak	Spacewatch	EUN	870 m	MPC · JPL
793531	2004 CO_{49}	—	February 14, 2004	Socorro	LINEAR	APO · PHA	160 m	MPC · JPL
793532	2004 CZ_{112}	—	January 17, 2004	Palomar Mountain	NEAT	H	380 m	MPC · JPL
793533	2004 CG_{129}	—	February 14, 2004	Kitt Peak	Spacewatch	·	930 m	MPC · JPL
793534	2004 CT_{132}	—	October 21, 2016	Mount Lemmon	Mount Lemmon Survey	PHO	820 m	MPC · JPL
793535	2004 CF_{134}	—	December 3, 2015	Mount Lemmon	Mount Lemmon Survey	·	850 m	MPC · JPL
793536	2004 DX_{68}	—	February 26, 2004	Kitt Peak	Deep Ecliptic Survey	·	570 m	MPC · JPL
793537	2004 DN_{84}	—	January 18, 2016	Mount Lemmon	Mount Lemmon Survey	·	1.0 km	MPC · JPL
793538	2004 DQ_{85}	—	November 25, 2011	Haleakala	Pan-STARRS 1	(5)	870 m	MPC · JPL
793539	2004 DW_{86}	—	January 25, 2009	Kitt Peak	Spacewatch	·	1.3 km	MPC · JPL
793540	2004 DC_{89}	—	April 5, 2014	Haleakala	Pan-STARRS 1	·	1.3 km	MPC · JPL
793541	2004 DN_{89}	—	February 29, 2004	Kitt Peak	Spacewatch	·	1.9 km	MPC · JPL
793542	2004 ER_{4}	—	March 11, 2004	Palomar Mountain	NEAT	·	840 m	MPC · JPL
793543	2004 EZ_{26}	—	March 14, 2004	Kitt Peak	Spacewatch	·	1.4 km	MPC · JPL
793544	2004 ED_{45}	—	March 15, 2004	Kitt Peak	Spacewatch	·	2.0 km	MPC · JPL
793545	2004 ES_{107}	—	March 15, 2004	Kitt Peak	Spacewatch	·	1.2 km	MPC · JPL
793546	2004 ET_{116}	—	February 5, 2011	Haleakala	Pan-STARRS 1	·	670 m	MPC · JPL
793547	2004 EE_{118}	—	March 15, 2004	Kitt Peak	Spacewatch	·	1.3 km	MPC · JPL
793548	2004 FN_{1}	—	March 17, 2004	Socorro	LINEAR	T_{j} (2.85)	1.7 km	MPC · JPL
793549	2004 FC_{5}	—	March 18, 2004	Kitt Peak	Spacewatch	H	450 m	MPC · JPL
793550	2004 FL_{5}	—	March 16, 2004	Socorro	LINEAR	H	480 m	MPC · JPL
793551	2004 FX_{74}	—	March 17, 2004	Kitt Peak	Spacewatch	·	940 m	MPC · JPL
793552	2004 FC_{101}	—	March 23, 2004	Socorro	LINEAR	·	970 m	MPC · JPL
793553	2004 FX_{122}	—	March 26, 2004	Kitt Peak	Spacewatch	·	800 m	MPC · JPL
793554	2004 FA_{129}	—	March 28, 2004	Kitt Peak	Spacewatch	·	870 m	MPC · JPL
793555	2004 FE_{138}	—	March 29, 2004	Kitt Peak	Spacewatch	·	990 m	MPC · JPL
793556	2004 FW_{152}	—	March 17, 2004	Kitt Peak	Spacewatch	·	1.1 km	MPC · JPL
793557	2004 FV_{171}	—	April 29, 1997	Kitt Peak	Spacewatch	·	710 m	MPC · JPL
793558	2004 FJ_{176}	—	March 18, 2018	Haleakala	Pan-STARRS 1	·	1.2 km	MPC · JPL
793559	2004 FG_{178}	—	March 17, 2004	Sacramento Peak	SDSS	(116763)	960 m	MPC · JPL
793560	2004 GL_{4}	—	April 11, 2004	Palomar Mountain	NEAT	TIR	2.0 km	MPC · JPL
793561	2004 GQ_{53}	—	April 13, 2004	Kitt Peak	Spacewatch	·	890 m	MPC · JPL
793562	2004 GG_{68}	—	April 13, 2004	Kitt Peak	Spacewatch	EUN	770 m	MPC · JPL
793563	2004 GK_{76}	—	April 15, 2004	Kitt Peak	Spacewatch	·	760 m	MPC · JPL
793564	2004 GK_{92}	—	April 12, 2004	Kitt Peak	Spacewatch	EUN	900 m	MPC · JPL
793565	2004 HH_{33}	—	April 23, 2004	Haleakala	NEAT	AMO	250 m	MPC · JPL
793566	2004 HT_{76}	—	April 26, 2004	Mauna Kea	P. A. Wiegert, D. D. Balam	·	1.5 km	MPC · JPL
793567	2004 HD_{77}	—	June 30, 2019	Haleakala	Pan-STARRS 1	L4	5.9 km	MPC · JPL
793568	2004 HF_{77}	—	April 26, 2004	Mauna Kea	P. A. Wiegert, D. D. Balam	·	1.5 km	MPC · JPL
793569	2004 HM_{84}	—	March 26, 2008	Mount Lemmon	Mount Lemmon Survey	·	800 m	MPC · JPL
793570	2004 JZ_{3}	—	May 9, 2004	Kitt Peak	Spacewatch	·	690 m	MPC · JPL
793571	2004 JH_{13}	—	May 13, 2004	Socorro	LINEAR	·	1.1 km	MPC · JPL
793572	2004 JA_{23}	—	April 21, 2004	Kitt Peak	Spacewatch	·	1.1 km	MPC · JPL
793573	2004 JV_{57}	—	March 10, 2018	Haleakala	Pan-STARRS 1	·	830 m	MPC · JPL
793574	2004 JZ_{57}	—	December 23, 2016	Haleakala	Pan-STARRS 1	H	370 m	MPC · JPL
793575	2004 KL_{21}	—	May 20, 2004	Kitt Peak	Spacewatch	·	2.0 km	MPC · JPL
793576	2004 KL_{22}	—	May 19, 2004	Kitt Peak	Spacewatch	·	1.2 km	MPC · JPL
793577	2004 LL_{28}	—	June 14, 2004	Kitt Peak	Spacewatch	·	1.3 km	MPC · JPL
793578	2004 MP_{3}	—	June 21, 2004	Socorro	LINEAR	AMO	670 m	MPC · JPL
793579	2004 MM_{5}	—	April 21, 2004	Kitt Peak	Spacewatch	·	1.3 km	MPC · JPL
793580	2004 ME_{9}	—	October 16, 2013	Mount Lemmon	Mount Lemmon Survey	·	1.1 km	MPC · JPL
793581	2004 ND_{27}	—	July 11, 2004	Socorro	LINEAR	·	980 m	MPC · JPL
793582	2004 NM_{27}	—	July 11, 2004	Socorro	LINEAR	·	1.3 km	MPC · JPL
793583	2004 OX_{1}	—	July 16, 2004	Socorro	LINEAR	·	1.1 km	MPC · JPL
793584	2004 PH_{58}	—	July 9, 2004	Palomar Mountain	NEAT	·	650 m	MPC · JPL
793585	2004 PZ_{116}	—	August 20, 2004	Kitt Peak	Spacewatch	·	1.2 km	MPC · JPL
793586	2004 PJ_{120}	—	May 7, 2014	Haleakala	Pan-STARRS 1	EOS	1.4 km	MPC · JPL
793587	2004 PU_{121}	—	February 11, 2018	Haleakala	Pan-STARRS 1	·	1.2 km	MPC · JPL
793588	2004 PO_{122}	—	August 15, 2004	Cerro Tololo	Deep Ecliptic Survey	RAF	670 m	MPC · JPL
793589	2004 PS_{122}	—	August 20, 2004	Kitt Peak	Spacewatch	·	1.4 km	MPC · JPL
793590	2004 QL_{28}	—	August 25, 2004	Kitt Peak	Spacewatch	TIR	2.3 km	MPC · JPL
793591	2004 QG_{31}	—	February 25, 2012	Mount Lemmon	Mount Lemmon Survey	·	1.4 km	MPC · JPL
793592	2004 QH_{32}	—	January 27, 2015	Haleakala	Pan-STARRS 1	·	1.4 km	MPC · JPL
793593	2004 RZ_{41}	—	September 7, 2004	Kitt Peak	Spacewatch	·	1.6 km	MPC · JPL
793594	2004 RK_{83}	—	September 9, 2004	Socorro	LINEAR	·	1.3 km	MPC · JPL
793595	2004 RK_{120}	—	September 7, 2004	Kitt Peak	Spacewatch	·	1.4 km	MPC · JPL
793596	2004 RA_{125}	—	September 7, 2004	Kitt Peak	Spacewatch	·	1.2 km	MPC · JPL
793597	2004 RX_{129}	—	September 7, 2004	Kitt Peak	Spacewatch	THM	1.9 km	MPC · JPL
793598	2004 RM_{131}	—	September 7, 2004	Kitt Peak	Spacewatch	·	1.3 km	MPC · JPL
793599	2004 RM_{133}	—	September 7, 2004	Kitt Peak	Spacewatch	·	420 m	MPC · JPL
793600	2004 RN_{158}	—	September 10, 2004	Socorro	LINEAR	·	770 m	MPC · JPL

== 793601–793700 ==
back to top

Designation			Discovery			Properties		Ref
Permanent	Provisional	Named after	Date	Site	Discoverer(s)	Category	Diam.	Ref
793601	2004 RV_{160}	—	September 10, 2004	Kitt Peak	Spacewatch	NEM	1.5 km	MPC · JPL
793602	2004 RS_{171}	—	September 9, 2004	Socorro	LINEAR	NYS	940 m	MPC · JPL
793603	2004 RX_{176}	—	August 14, 2004	Cerro Tololo	Deep Ecliptic Survey	·	1.2 km	MPC · JPL
793604	2004 RR_{268}	—	September 11, 2004	Kitt Peak	Spacewatch	·	1.2 km	MPC · JPL
793605	2004 RY_{269}	—	September 11, 2004	Kitt Peak	Spacewatch	·	1.5 km	MPC · JPL
793606	2004 RE_{279}	—	September 15, 2004	Kitt Peak	Spacewatch	·	1.4 km	MPC · JPL
793607	2004 RP_{285}	—	September 15, 2004	Kitt Peak	Spacewatch	THM	1.7 km	MPC · JPL
793608	2004 RO_{301}	—	September 11, 2004	Kitt Peak	Spacewatch	·	1.1 km	MPC · JPL
793609	2004 RB_{303}	—	September 12, 2004	Kitt Peak	Spacewatch	·	1.3 km	MPC · JPL
793610	2004 RU_{317}	—	September 12, 2004	Kitt Peak	Spacewatch	·	1.9 km	MPC · JPL
793611	2004 RL_{332}	—	September 14, 2004	Palomar Mountain	NEAT	·	1.6 km	MPC · JPL
793612	2004 RU_{362}	—	April 11, 2008	Mount Lemmon	Mount Lemmon Survey	THB	1.9 km	MPC · JPL
793613	2004 RC_{365}	—	October 2, 2013	Mount Lemmon	Mount Lemmon Survey	·	1.1 km	MPC · JPL
793614	2004 RE_{367}	—	September 12, 2004	Kitt Peak	Spacewatch	·	1.2 km	MPC · JPL
793615	2004 SH_{1}	—	August 12, 2004	Palomar Mountain	NEAT	JUN	810 m	MPC · JPL
793616	2004 SE_{8}	—	September 17, 2004	Kitt Peak	Spacewatch	PHO	810 m	MPC · JPL
793617	2004 SE_{63}	—	September 16, 2004	Kitt Peak	Spacewatch	·	2.2 km	MPC · JPL
793618	2004 SR_{63}	—	September 16, 2004	Kitt Peak	Spacewatch	·	1.0 km	MPC · JPL
793619	2004 SX_{63}	—	September 5, 2013	Kitt Peak	Spacewatch	·	1.2 km	MPC · JPL
793620	2004 SR_{65}	—	September 23, 2004	Kitt Peak	Spacewatch	·	2.0 km	MPC · JPL
793621	2004 SQ_{66}	—	September 16, 2004	Kitt Peak	Spacewatch	·	1.3 km	MPC · JPL
793622	2004 TC	—	October 3, 2004	Palomar Mountain	NEAT	·	1.3 km	MPC · JPL
793623	2004 TS_{3}	—	September 10, 2004	Kitt Peak	Spacewatch	·	2.3 km	MPC · JPL
793624	2004 TU_{14}	—	October 7, 2004	Socorro	LINEAR	·	1.7 km	MPC · JPL
793625	2004 TZ_{33}	—	August 23, 2004	Siding Spring	SSS	·	520 m	MPC · JPL
793626	2004 TL_{47}	—	October 4, 2004	Kitt Peak	Spacewatch	·	1.1 km	MPC · JPL
793627	2004 TK_{74}	—	October 6, 2004	Kitt Peak	Spacewatch	NYS	860 m	MPC · JPL
793628	2004 TV_{99}	—	September 17, 2004	Kitt Peak	Spacewatch	MAS	590 m	MPC · JPL
793629	2004 TB_{115}	—	October 8, 2004	Kitt Peak	Spacewatch	·	2.6 km	MPC · JPL
793630	2004 TG_{140}	—	October 4, 2004	Kitt Peak	Spacewatch	EUN	720 m	MPC · JPL
793631	2004 TN_{141}	—	October 4, 2004	Kitt Peak	Spacewatch	·	1.3 km	MPC · JPL
793632	2004 TN_{151}	—	October 6, 2004	Kitt Peak	Spacewatch	·	2.4 km	MPC · JPL
793633	2004 TU_{179}	—	September 9, 2004	Socorro	LINEAR	·	1.4 km	MPC · JPL
793634	2004 TQ_{185}	—	September 10, 2004	Kitt Peak	Spacewatch	·	2.4 km	MPC · JPL
793635	2004 TN_{190}	—	October 7, 2004	Kitt Peak	Spacewatch	AGN	810 m	MPC · JPL
793636	2004 TD_{194}	—	October 7, 2004	Kitt Peak	Spacewatch	·	2.2 km	MPC · JPL
793637	2004 TS_{194}	—	October 7, 2004	Kitt Peak	Spacewatch	·	1.2 km	MPC · JPL
793638	2004 TD_{217}	—	September 24, 2004	Kitt Peak	Spacewatch	·	1.6 km	MPC · JPL
793639	2004 TW_{230}	—	October 8, 2004	Kitt Peak	Spacewatch	·	1.0 km	MPC · JPL
793640	2004 TV_{233}	—	October 8, 2004	Kitt Peak	Spacewatch	·	1.2 km	MPC · JPL
793641	2004 TE_{244}	—	September 13, 2004	Palomar Mountain	NEAT	·	780 m	MPC · JPL
793642	2004 TC_{251}	—	October 9, 2004	Kitt Peak	Spacewatch	·	2.1 km	MPC · JPL
793643	2004 TN_{252}	—	October 9, 2004	Kitt Peak	Spacewatch	·	2.2 km	MPC · JPL
793644	2004 TV_{253}	—	October 9, 2004	Kitt Peak	Spacewatch	·	1.3 km	MPC · JPL
793645	2004 TP_{284}	—	October 8, 2004	Kitt Peak	Spacewatch	·	2.4 km	MPC · JPL
793646	2004 TV_{291}	—	October 10, 2004	Kitt Peak	Spacewatch	·	1.2 km	MPC · JPL
793647	2004 TF_{305}	—	October 10, 2004	Kitt Peak	Spacewatch	·	2.3 km	MPC · JPL
793648	2004 TA_{317}	—	October 11, 2004	Kitt Peak	Spacewatch	T_{j} (2.99) · EUP	1.7 km	MPC · JPL
793649	2004 TW_{334}	—	September 23, 2004	Kitt Peak	Spacewatch	TIR	2.2 km	MPC · JPL
793650	2004 TK_{338}	—	October 12, 2004	Kitt Peak	Spacewatch	(1118)	2.6 km	MPC · JPL
793651	2004 TC_{355}	—	October 13, 2004	Kitt Peak	Spacewatch	·	1.5 km	MPC · JPL
793652	2004 TL_{375}	—	March 18, 2016	Mount Lemmon	Mount Lemmon Survey	·	1.3 km	MPC · JPL
793653	2004 TK_{376}	—	April 2, 2016	Haleakala	Pan-STARRS 1	·	1.2 km	MPC · JPL
793654	2004 TH_{383}	—	January 27, 2006	Mount Lemmon	Mount Lemmon Survey	PHO	750 m	MPC · JPL
793655	2004 TR_{386}	—	October 6, 2004	Kitt Peak	Spacewatch	·	2.5 km	MPC · JPL
793656	2004 TG_{388}	—	October 10, 2004	Kitt Peak	Deep Ecliptic Survey	·	1.4 km	MPC · JPL
793657	2004 VU_{2}	—	October 10, 2004	Kitt Peak	Deep Ecliptic Survey	·	1.1 km	MPC · JPL
793658	2004 VJ_{46}	—	November 4, 2004	Kitt Peak	Spacewatch	·	1.0 km	MPC · JPL
793659	2004 VC_{67}	—	November 10, 2004	Kitt Peak	Spacewatch	·	1.5 km	MPC · JPL
793660	2004 VW_{67}	—	November 10, 2004	Kitt Peak	Deep Ecliptic Survey	·	1.3 km	MPC · JPL
793661	2004 VZ_{101}	—	November 9, 2004	Mauna Kea	Veillet, C.	3:2	2.8 km	MPC · JPL
793662	2004 VN_{103}	—	November 3, 2004	Kitt Peak	Spacewatch	·	1.1 km	MPC · JPL
793663	2004 VX_{104}	—	November 9, 2004	Mauna Kea	Veillet, C.	·	640 m	MPC · JPL
793664	2004 VL_{110}	—	November 9, 2004	Mauna Kea	Veillet, C.	·	1.0 km	MPC · JPL
793665	2004 VV_{133}	—	September 23, 2008	Mount Lemmon	Mount Lemmon Survey	·	990 m	MPC · JPL
793666	2004 VM_{134}	—	September 6, 2008	Mount Lemmon	Mount Lemmon Survey	·	1.0 km	MPC · JPL
793667	2004 VY_{134}	—	July 23, 2015	Haleakala	Pan-STARRS 2	·	930 m	MPC · JPL
793668	2004 VC_{136}	—	May 1, 2012	Mount Lemmon	Mount Lemmon Survey	·	1.5 km	MPC · JPL
793669	2004 VE_{136}	—	October 9, 2013	Kitt Peak	Spacewatch	·	1.2 km	MPC · JPL
793670	2004 VT_{137}	—	August 9, 2015	Haleakala	Pan-STARRS 1	TIR	2.6 km	MPC · JPL
793671	2004 WE_{13}	—	January 28, 2014	Mount Lemmon	Mount Lemmon Survey	·	1.2 km	MPC · JPL
793672	2004 WY_{13}	—	May 7, 2016	Haleakala	Pan-STARRS 1	·	1.3 km	MPC · JPL
793673	2004 XZ_{16}	—	December 3, 2004	Kitt Peak	Spacewatch	·	1.1 km	MPC · JPL
793674	2004 XZ_{111}	—	December 10, 2004	Kitt Peak	Spacewatch	ADE	1.2 km	MPC · JPL
793675	2004 XG_{171}	—	December 9, 2004	Kitt Peak	Spacewatch	EUP	3.1 km	MPC · JPL
793676	2004 XU_{195}	—	August 7, 2016	Haleakala	Pan-STARRS 1	·	1.1 km	MPC · JPL
793677	2004 XB_{198}	—	November 17, 2009	Mount Lemmon	Mount Lemmon Survey	·	1.7 km	MPC · JPL
793678	2005 AC_{84}	—	January 8, 2005	Campo Imperatore	CINEOS	HNS	980 m	MPC · JPL
793679	2005 BU_{30}	—	January 16, 2005	Mauna Kea	Veillet, C.	KOR	830 m	MPC · JPL
793680	2005 BG_{31}	—	January 16, 2005	Mauna Kea	Veillet, C.	THM	1.7 km	MPC · JPL
793681	2005 BB_{32}	—	January 16, 2005	Mauna Kea	Veillet, C.	·	1.9 km	MPC · JPL
793682	2005 BN_{54}	—	January 17, 2005	Kitt Peak	Spacewatch	H	390 m	MPC · JPL
793683	2005 BL_{57}	—	August 11, 2018	Haleakala	Pan-STARRS 1	·	1.3 km	MPC · JPL
793684	2005 BS_{57}	—	December 22, 2008	Kitt Peak	Spacewatch	·	840 m	MPC · JPL
793685	2005 CJ_{39}	—	February 9, 2005	La Silla	A. Boattini, H. Scholl	·	970 m	MPC · JPL
793686	2005 CM_{87}	—	May 21, 2018	Haleakala	Pan-STARRS 1	(1118)	2.2 km	MPC · JPL
793687	2005 CP_{87}	—	March 21, 2015	Haleakala	Pan-STARRS 1	AGN	900 m	MPC · JPL
793688	2005 DC_{4}	—	May 4, 2009	Mount Lemmon	Mount Lemmon Survey	·	690 m	MPC · JPL
793689	2005 EL_{62}	—	March 4, 2005	Mount Lemmon	Mount Lemmon Survey	THM	1.6 km	MPC · JPL
793690	2005 EF_{94}	—	March 9, 2005	Mount Lemmon	Mount Lemmon Survey	·	1.2 km	MPC · JPL
793691	2005 EH_{106}	—	March 4, 2005	Mount Lemmon	Mount Lemmon Survey	BRA	1.1 km	MPC · JPL
793692	2005 EU_{106}	—	March 4, 2005	Mount Lemmon	Mount Lemmon Survey	·	1.2 km	MPC · JPL
793693	2005 EM_{128}	—	March 9, 2005	Kitt Peak	Spacewatch	·	2.2 km	MPC · JPL
793694	2005 EP_{159}	—	March 9, 2005	Mount Lemmon	Mount Lemmon Survey	·	2.5 km	MPC · JPL
793695	2005 EU_{186}	—	March 10, 2005	Mount Lemmon	Mount Lemmon Survey	·	1.3 km	MPC · JPL
793696	2005 ET_{190}	—	March 11, 2005	Mount Lemmon	Mount Lemmon Survey	·	1.0 km	MPC · JPL
793697	2005 EO_{230}	—	September 13, 2007	Kitt Peak	Spacewatch	·	1.1 km	MPC · JPL
793698	2005 EG_{232}	—	March 10, 2005	Mount Lemmon	Mount Lemmon Survey	·	440 m	MPC · JPL
793699	2005 EO_{263}	—	March 13, 2005	Mount Lemmon	Mount Lemmon Survey	·	2.3 km	MPC · JPL
793700	2005 EX_{291}	—	November 15, 2018	Kitt Peak	Spacewatch	·	1.3 km	MPC · JPL

== 793701–793800 ==
back to top

Designation			Discovery			Properties		Ref
Permanent	Provisional	Named after	Date	Site	Discoverer(s)	Category	Diam.	Ref
793701	2005 EZ_{295}	—	March 9, 2005	Kitt Peak	Deep Ecliptic Survey	·	1.5 km	MPC · JPL
793702	2005 EM_{297}	—	March 11, 2005	Kitt Peak	Deep Ecliptic Survey	KOR	970 m	MPC · JPL
793703	2005 EN_{303}	—	March 11, 2005	Kitt Peak	Deep Ecliptic Survey	·	1.4 km	MPC · JPL
793704	2005 EB_{307}	—	March 8, 2005	Mount Lemmon	Mount Lemmon Survey	·	1.2 km	MPC · JPL
793705	2005 ES_{307}	—	March 8, 2005	Mount Lemmon	Mount Lemmon Survey	·	1.6 km	MPC · JPL
793706	2005 EW_{308}	—	March 9, 2005	Mount Lemmon	Mount Lemmon Survey	·	680 m	MPC · JPL
793707	2005 ES_{313}	—	March 10, 2005	Mount Lemmon	Mount Lemmon Survey	AGN	930 m	MPC · JPL
793708	2005 ES_{334}	—	March 11, 2005	Mount Lemmon	Mount Lemmon Survey	·	630 m	MPC · JPL
793709	2005 EB_{340}	—	September 11, 2007	Kitt Peak	Spacewatch	·	980 m	MPC · JPL
793710	2005 EX_{342}	—	May 19, 2010	Mount Lemmon	Mount Lemmon Survey	·	1.1 km	MPC · JPL
793711	2005 ED_{344}	—	March 11, 2005	Mount Lemmon	Mount Lemmon Survey	·	510 m	MPC · JPL
793712	2005 EN_{347}	—	December 13, 2015	Haleakala	Pan-STARRS 1	·	2.1 km	MPC · JPL
793713	2005 EO_{347}	—	February 5, 2016	Haleakala	Pan-STARRS 1	·	1.8 km	MPC · JPL
793714	2005 ET_{347}	—	January 15, 2015	Haleakala	Pan-STARRS 1	EOS	1.3 km	MPC · JPL
793715	2005 EM_{350}	—	August 26, 2012	Haleakala	Pan-STARRS 1	KOR	990 m	MPC · JPL
793716	2005 EF_{352}	—	March 8, 2005	Mount Lemmon	Mount Lemmon Survey	·	2.0 km	MPC · JPL
793717	2005 GS_{65}	—	April 2, 2005	Mount Lemmon	Mount Lemmon Survey	·	910 m	MPC · JPL
793718	2005 GN_{66}	—	April 2, 2005	Mount Lemmon	Mount Lemmon Survey	THM	1.9 km	MPC · JPL
793719	2005 GU_{76}	—	April 5, 2005	Mount Lemmon	Mount Lemmon Survey	·	520 m	MPC · JPL
793720	2005 GD_{131}	—	March 12, 2005	Mount Lemmon	Mount Lemmon Survey	H	490 m	MPC · JPL
793721	2005 GW_{159}	—	April 2, 2005	Kitt Peak	Spacewatch	·	1.3 km	MPC · JPL
793722	2005 GH_{177}	—	April 5, 2005	Mount Lemmon	Mount Lemmon Survey	·	1.0 km	MPC · JPL
793723	2005 GP_{186}	—	April 11, 2005	Mount Lemmon	Mount Lemmon Survey	·	1.3 km	MPC · JPL
793724	2005 GQ_{186}	—	April 10, 2005	Kitt Peak	Deep Ecliptic Survey	·	1.3 km	MPC · JPL
793725	2005 GT_{186}	—	April 10, 2005	Kitt Peak	Deep Ecliptic Survey	·	930 m	MPC · JPL
793726	2005 GC_{188}	—	April 12, 2005	Kitt Peak	Deep Ecliptic Survey	EOS	1.3 km	MPC · JPL
793727	2005 GX_{191}	—	April 12, 2005	Kitt Peak	Deep Ecliptic Survey	·	1.9 km	MPC · JPL
793728	2005 GA_{193}	—	April 10, 2005	Kitt Peak	Deep Ecliptic Survey	·	1.2 km	MPC · JPL
793729	2005 GG_{193}	—	April 10, 2005	Kitt Peak	Deep Ecliptic Survey	KOR	880 m	MPC · JPL
793730	2005 GH_{198}	—	April 10, 2005	Kitt Peak	Deep Ecliptic Survey	·	1.9 km	MPC · JPL
793731	2005 GG_{200}	—	April 10, 2005	Kitt Peak	Deep Ecliptic Survey	·	990 m	MPC · JPL
793732	2005 GP_{219}	—	April 4, 2005	Kitt Peak	Spacewatch	H	480 m	MPC · JPL
793733	2005 GH_{229}	—	January 21, 2015	Haleakala	Pan-STARRS 1	·	1.4 km	MPC · JPL
793734	2005 GH_{235}	—	March 10, 2016	Haleakala	Pan-STARRS 1	·	2.9 km	MPC · JPL
793735	2005 GS_{235}	—	October 8, 2015	Haleakala	Pan-STARRS 1	(5)	660 m	MPC · JPL
793736	2005 GF_{237}	—	February 8, 2013	Haleakala	Pan-STARRS 1	·	910 m	MPC · JPL
793737	2005 GF_{238}	—	November 18, 2007	Kitt Peak	Spacewatch	·	760 m	MPC · JPL
793738	2005 GZ_{241}	—	April 7, 2005	Kitt Peak	Spacewatch	·	1.2 km	MPC · JPL
793739	2005 GA_{242}	—	April 11, 2005	Mount Lemmon	Mount Lemmon Survey	(194)	1.3 km	MPC · JPL
793740	2005 HJ_{12}	—	December 21, 2014	Haleakala	Pan-STARRS 1	·	2.2 km	MPC · JPL
793741	2005 HF_{13}	—	April 17, 2005	Kitt Peak	Spacewatch	JUN	830 m	MPC · JPL
793742	2005 JE_{8}	—	May 4, 2005	Mauna Kea	Veillet, C.	·	1.7 km	MPC · JPL
793743	2005 JK_{9}	—	May 4, 2005	Mauna Kea	Veillet, C.	·	1.5 km	MPC · JPL
793744	2005 JD_{10}	—	May 4, 2005	Mauna Kea	Veillet, C.	·	680 m	MPC · JPL
793745	2005 JL_{13}	—	April 11, 2005	Mount Lemmon	Mount Lemmon Survey	·	1.2 km	MPC · JPL
793746	2005 JC_{45}	—	May 4, 2005	Kitt Peak	Spacewatch	·	1.1 km	MPC · JPL
793747	2005 JS_{56}	—	May 6, 2005	Kitt Peak	Spacewatch	·	1.1 km	MPC · JPL
793748	2005 JA_{64}	—	May 4, 2005	Kitt Peak	D. E. Trilling, A. S. Rivkin	·	760 m	MPC · JPL
793749	2005 JJ_{104}	—	May 10, 2005	Mount Lemmon	Mount Lemmon Survey	·	690 m	MPC · JPL
793750	2005 JY_{171}	—	May 14, 2005	Mount Lemmon	Mount Lemmon Survey	·	1.2 km	MPC · JPL
793751	2005 JD_{172}	—	May 10, 2005	Cerro Tololo	Deep Ecliptic Survey	·	1.3 km	MPC · JPL
793752	2005 JJ_{193}	—	March 5, 2017	Haleakala	Pan-STARRS 1	·	930 m	MPC · JPL
793753	2005 JR_{194}	—	May 14, 2005	Mount Lemmon	Mount Lemmon Survey	·	720 m	MPC · JPL
793754	2005 KB	—	May 16, 2005	Palomar Mountain	NEAT	H	530 m	MPC · JPL
793755	2005 KA_{16}	—	April 16, 2018	Haleakala	Pan-STARRS 1	·	1.1 km	MPC · JPL
793756	2005 LU_{13}	—	June 4, 2005	Kitt Peak	Spacewatch	·	2.3 km	MPC · JPL
793757	2005 LF_{55}	—	March 22, 2015	Haleakala	Pan-STARRS 1	·	680 m	MPC · JPL
793758	2005 LA_{57}	—	August 25, 2014	Haleakala	Pan-STARRS 1	·	960 m	MPC · JPL
793759	2005 LH_{58}	—	February 6, 2016	Haleakala	Pan-STARRS 1	ADE	1.5 km	MPC · JPL
793760	2005 LE_{61}	—	October 13, 2015	Mount Lemmon	Mount Lemmon Survey	·	1.3 km	MPC · JPL
793761	2005 MF_{55}	—	June 17, 2005	Mount Lemmon	Mount Lemmon Survey	·	1 km	MPC · JPL
793762	2005 MU_{56}	—	June 29, 2005	Palomar Mountain	NEAT	·	600 m	MPC · JPL
793763	2005 MY_{56}	—	June 18, 2005	Mount Lemmon	Mount Lemmon Survey	(5)	900 m	MPC · JPL
793764	2005 MZ_{56}	—	June 29, 2005	Kitt Peak	Spacewatch	·	1.2 km	MPC · JPL
793765	2005 NO_{47}	—	July 7, 2005	Kitt Peak	Spacewatch	H	410 m	MPC · JPL
793766	2005 NS_{49}	—	July 4, 2005	Mount Lemmon	Mount Lemmon Survey	·	990 m	MPC · JPL
793767	2005 NV_{54}	—	July 10, 2005	Kitt Peak	Spacewatch	EUN	930 m	MPC · JPL
793768	2005 NT_{59}	—	July 9, 2005	Kitt Peak	Spacewatch	·	880 m	MPC · JPL
793769	2005 NL_{78}	—	July 11, 2005	Kitt Peak	Spacewatch	·	820 m	MPC · JPL
793770	2005 NB_{89}	—	July 4, 2005	Mount Lemmon	Mount Lemmon Survey	·	1.0 km	MPC · JPL
793771	2005 NG_{89}	—	July 7, 2014	Haleakala	Pan-STARRS 1	·	1.1 km	MPC · JPL
793772	2005 NK_{93}	—	July 5, 2005	Palomar Mountain	NEAT	·	570 m	MPC · JPL
793773	2005 NY_{93}	—	July 6, 2005	Kitt Peak	Spacewatch	·	1.4 km	MPC · JPL
793774	2005 NR_{100}	—	July 6, 2005	Kitt Peak	Spacewatch	(5)	990 m	MPC · JPL
793775	2005 NA_{105}	—	July 7, 2005	Mauna Kea	Veillet, C.	·	980 m	MPC · JPL
793776	2005 NJ_{105}	—	July 7, 2005	Mauna Kea	Veillet, C.	·	1.2 km	MPC · JPL
793777	2005 NE_{111}	—	July 7, 2005	Mauna Kea	Veillet, C.	·	1.7 km	MPC · JPL
793778	2005 NJ_{111}	—	July 7, 2005	Mauna Kea	Veillet, C.	·	1.1 km	MPC · JPL
793779	2005 NM_{111}	—	July 7, 2005	Mauna Kea	Veillet, C.	·	820 m	MPC · JPL
793780	2005 NV_{111}	—	July 7, 2005	Mauna Kea	Veillet, C.	·	1.3 km	MPC · JPL
793781	2005 NW_{119}	—	July 15, 2005	Mount Lemmon	Mount Lemmon Survey	·	830 m	MPC · JPL
793782	2005 NE_{120}	—	July 7, 2005	Mauna Kea	Veillet, C.	KOR	920 m	MPC · JPL
793783	2005 NF_{131}	—	February 3, 2016	Haleakala	Pan-STARRS 1	EUN	880 m	MPC · JPL
793784	2005 NW_{131}	—	July 4, 2005	Mount Lemmon	Mount Lemmon Survey	·	1.2 km	MPC · JPL
793785	2005 NU_{132}	—	July 1, 2005	Palomar Mountain	NEAT	·	920 m	MPC · JPL
793786	2005 NX_{132}	—	July 15, 2005	Mount Lemmon	Mount Lemmon Survey	·	1.8 km	MPC · JPL
793787	2005 NL_{134}	—	November 11, 2010	Mount Lemmon	Mount Lemmon Survey	·	830 m	MPC · JPL
793788	2005 NW_{134}	—	January 15, 2019	Haleakala	Pan-STARRS 1	·	1.3 km	MPC · JPL
793789	2005 OK_{21}	—	July 28, 2005	Palomar Mountain	NEAT	·	1.5 km	MPC · JPL
793790	2005 OS_{25}	—	July 31, 2005	Palomar Mountain	NEAT	·	1.9 km	MPC · JPL
793791	2005 OT_{30}	—	July 31, 2005	Mauna Kea	P. A. Wiegert, D. D. Balam	·	1.6 km	MPC · JPL
793792	2005 OW_{33}	—	July 18, 2005	Palomar Mountain	NEAT	·	1.5 km	MPC · JPL
793793	2005 OF_{34}	—	May 21, 2017	Haleakala	Pan-STARRS 1	RAF	750 m	MPC · JPL
793794	2005 PT_{9}	—	August 4, 2005	Palomar Mountain	NEAT	·	1.7 km	MPC · JPL
793795	2005 PF_{12}	—	August 4, 2005	Palomar Mountain	NEAT	·	1.2 km	MPC · JPL
793796	2005 PM_{12}	—	July 12, 2005	Mount Lemmon	Mount Lemmon Survey	·	640 m	MPC · JPL
793797	2005 PL_{26}	—	August 5, 2005	Mauna Kea	P. A. Wiegert, D. D. Balam	·	2.2 km	MPC · JPL
793798	2005 PH_{31}	—	September 15, 2017	Haleakala	Pan-STARRS 1	·	2.1 km	MPC · JPL
793799	2005 PN_{31}	—	August 5, 2005	Palomar Mountain	NEAT	·	1.8 km	MPC · JPL
793800	2005 QZ	—	July 12, 2005	Mount Lemmon	Mount Lemmon Survey	·	940 m	MPC · JPL

== 793801–793900 ==
back to top

Designation			Discovery			Properties		Ref
Permanent	Provisional	Named after	Date	Site	Discoverer(s)	Category	Diam.	Ref
793801	2005 QE_{19}	—	August 5, 2005	Palomar Mountain	NEAT	·	1.3 km	MPC · JPL
793802	2005 QN_{21}	—	August 26, 2005	Anderson Mesa	LONEOS	·	620 m	MPC · JPL
793803	2005 QQ_{34}	—	July 30, 2005	Palomar Mountain	NEAT	·	1.5 km	MPC · JPL
793804	2005 QD_{51}	—	August 28, 2005	Kitt Peak	Spacewatch	TIR	2.1 km	MPC · JPL
793805	2005 QB_{66}	—	July 31, 2005	Palomar Mountain	NEAT	·	1.2 km	MPC · JPL
793806	2005 QH_{67}	—	August 28, 2005	Kitt Peak	Spacewatch	·	1 km	MPC · JPL
793807	2005 QL_{78}	—	August 25, 2005	Palomar Mountain	NEAT	NYS	880 m	MPC · JPL
793808	2005 QH_{93}	—	August 26, 2005	Palomar Mountain	NEAT	·	1.5 km	MPC · JPL
793809	2005 QS_{101}	—	August 31, 2005	Kitt Peak	Spacewatch	·	950 m	MPC · JPL
793810	2005 QC_{120}	—	August 28, 2005	Kitt Peak	Spacewatch	(5)	1.0 km	MPC · JPL
793811	2005 QK_{122}	—	August 28, 2005	Kitt Peak	Spacewatch	ADE	1.2 km	MPC · JPL
793812	2005 QP_{122}	—	August 28, 2005	Kitt Peak	Spacewatch	·	830 m	MPC · JPL
793813	2005 QV_{125}	—	August 28, 2005	Kitt Peak	Spacewatch	·	1.1 km	MPC · JPL
793814	2005 QR_{139}	—	August 28, 2005	Kitt Peak	Spacewatch	·	840 m	MPC · JPL
793815	2005 QK_{140}	—	August 28, 2005	Kitt Peak	Spacewatch	·	1.9 km	MPC · JPL
793816	2005 QX_{159}	—	July 30, 2005	Palomar Mountain	NEAT	·	1.0 km	MPC · JPL
793817	2005 QW_{179}	—	August 26, 2005	Palomar Mountain	NEAT	·	1.4 km	MPC · JPL
793818	2005 QA_{191}	—	August 28, 2005	Kitt Peak	Spacewatch	THM	1.8 km	MPC · JPL
793819	2005 QN_{195}	—	August 31, 2005	Palomar Mountain	NEAT	·	930 m	MPC · JPL
793820	2005 QR_{195}	—	February 8, 2011	Mount Lemmon	Mount Lemmon Survey	PHO	710 m	MPC · JPL
793821	2005 QA_{197}	—	August 29, 2005	Kitt Peak	Spacewatch	·	1.7 km	MPC · JPL
793822	2005 QF_{197}	—	August 26, 2005	Palomar Mountain	NEAT	DOR	1.8 km	MPC · JPL
793823	2005 QW_{203}	—	August 31, 2005	Kitt Peak	Spacewatch	·	1.5 km	MPC · JPL
793824	2005 QX_{204}	—	August 29, 2005	Kitt Peak	Spacewatch	·	1.1 km	MPC · JPL
793825	2005 QJ_{207}	—	August 28, 2005	Kitt Peak	Spacewatch	·	950 m	MPC · JPL
793826	2005 QV_{207}	—	August 30, 2005	Kitt Peak	Spacewatch	(5)	810 m	MPC · JPL
793827	2005 QG_{208}	—	March 7, 2008	Mount Lemmon	Mount Lemmon Survey	KOR	1.0 km	MPC · JPL
793828	2005 QU_{208}	—	August 28, 2005	Kitt Peak	Spacewatch	·	1.6 km	MPC · JPL
793829	2005 QF_{209}	—	August 29, 2005	Kitt Peak	Spacewatch	·	880 m	MPC · JPL
793830	2005 QH_{211}	—	August 29, 2005	Kitt Peak	Spacewatch	·	1 km	MPC · JPL
793831	2005 QU_{211}	—	February 4, 2019	Haleakala	Pan-STARRS 1	·	1.8 km	MPC · JPL
793832	2005 RQ_{1}	—	July 3, 2005	Palomar Mountain	NEAT	·	1.9 km	MPC · JPL
793833	2005 RN_{32}	—	August 27, 2001	Palomar Mountain	NEAT	·	980 m	MPC · JPL
793834	2005 RO_{41}	—	September 13, 2005	Kitt Peak	Spacewatch	·	830 m	MPC · JPL
793835	2005 RL_{47}	—	September 27, 2005	Sacramento Peak	SDSS Collaboration	·	1.9 km	MPC · JPL
793836	2005 RU_{54}	—	September 2, 2005	Palomar Mountain	NEAT	EUN	970 m	MPC · JPL
793837	2005 RB_{58}	—	January 25, 2015	Haleakala	Pan-STARRS 1	(194)	960 m	MPC · JPL
793838	2005 RY_{61}	—	September 12, 2005	Junk Bond	D. Healy	·	680 m	MPC · JPL
793839	2005 RU_{62}	—	September 12, 2005	Kitt Peak	Spacewatch	·	940 m	MPC · JPL
793840	2005 SO_{6}	—	September 23, 2005	Kitt Peak	Spacewatch	·	1.2 km	MPC · JPL
793841	2005 SC_{10}	—	September 25, 2005	Junk Bond	D. Healy	·	2.0 km	MPC · JPL
793842	2005 SX_{12}	—	September 24, 2005	Kitt Peak	Spacewatch	·	1.9 km	MPC · JPL
793843	2005 SC_{26}	—	September 26, 2005	Palomar Mountain	NEAT	·	890 m	MPC · JPL
793844	2005 SW_{42}	—	September 24, 2005	Kitt Peak	Spacewatch	·	1.4 km	MPC · JPL
793845	2005 SE_{53}	—	August 31, 2005	Kitt Peak	Spacewatch	(5)	960 m	MPC · JPL
793846	2005 SX_{60}	—	September 26, 2005	Kitt Peak	Spacewatch	·	1.9 km	MPC · JPL
793847	2005 SN_{63}	—	September 26, 2005	Kitt Peak	Spacewatch	·	1.1 km	MPC · JPL
793848	2005 SN_{74}	—	September 14, 2005	Kitt Peak	Spacewatch	THM	1.6 km	MPC · JPL
793849	2005 SS_{77}	—	September 24, 2005	Kitt Peak	Spacewatch	(5)	830 m	MPC · JPL
793850	2005 SO_{80}	—	September 24, 2005	Kitt Peak	Spacewatch	LIX	2.3 km	MPC · JPL
793851	2005 SF_{83}	—	September 24, 2005	Kitt Peak	Spacewatch	·	990 m	MPC · JPL
793852	2005 SU_{93}	—	September 24, 2005	Kitt Peak	Spacewatch	·	740 m	MPC · JPL
793853	2005 SP_{113}	—	September 27, 2005	Kitt Peak	Spacewatch	·	860 m	MPC · JPL
793854	2005 ST_{125}	—	September 29, 2005	Mount Lemmon	Mount Lemmon Survey	·	1.7 km	MPC · JPL
793855	2005 SP_{132}	—	September 29, 2005	Kitt Peak	Spacewatch	·	580 m	MPC · JPL
793856	2005 SQ_{133}	—	September 29, 2005	Kitt Peak	Spacewatch	·	1.4 km	MPC · JPL
793857	2005 SC_{139}	—	September 25, 2005	Kitt Peak	Spacewatch	·	2.0 km	MPC · JPL
793858	2005 SC_{147}	—	September 25, 2005	Kitt Peak	Spacewatch	·	1.8 km	MPC · JPL
793859	2005 SQ_{158}	—	September 26, 2005	Palomar Mountain	NEAT	ADE	1.8 km	MPC · JPL
793860	2005 SD_{159}	—	August 30, 2005	Anderson Mesa	LONEOS	·	1.1 km	MPC · JPL
793861	2005 SU_{167}	—	September 6, 2005	Catalina	CSS	·	1.3 km	MPC · JPL
793862	2005 SM_{174}	—	September 29, 2005	Kitt Peak	Spacewatch	·	1.9 km	MPC · JPL
793863	2005 SH_{176}	—	September 29, 2005	Kitt Peak	Spacewatch	·	2.1 km	MPC · JPL
793864	2005 SZ_{189}	—	September 29, 2005	Mount Lemmon	Mount Lemmon Survey	·	1.3 km	MPC · JPL
793865	2005 ST_{193}	—	September 29, 2005	Kitt Peak	Spacewatch	·	1.8 km	MPC · JPL
793866	2005 SS_{198}	—	August 30, 2005	Kitt Peak	Spacewatch	·	860 m	MPC · JPL
793867	2005 SG_{204}	—	September 30, 2005	Mount Lemmon	Mount Lemmon Survey	HYG	1.9 km	MPC · JPL
793868	2005 SP_{205}	—	August 29, 2005	Palomar Mountain	NEAT	·	1.3 km	MPC · JPL
793869	2005 SP_{206}	—	September 30, 2005	Mount Lemmon	Mount Lemmon Survey	·	2.1 km	MPC · JPL
793870	2005 ST_{211}	—	September 30, 2005	Mount Lemmon	Mount Lemmon Survey	·	1.2 km	MPC · JPL
793871	2005 SQ_{216}	—	September 30, 2005	Mount Lemmon	Mount Lemmon Survey	MIS	1.8 km	MPC · JPL
793872	2005 SD_{226}	—	September 30, 2005	Kitt Peak	Spacewatch	KOR	990 m	MPC · JPL
793873	2005 SR_{229}	—	September 30, 2005	Mount Lemmon	Mount Lemmon Survey	·	2.1 km	MPC · JPL
793874	2005 SZ_{239}	—	September 30, 2005	Kitt Peak	Spacewatch	·	1.5 km	MPC · JPL
793875	2005 SY_{244}	—	September 30, 2005	Mount Lemmon	Mount Lemmon Survey	·	1.6 km	MPC · JPL
793876	2005 SO_{245}	—	August 29, 2005	Palomar Mountain	NEAT	·	1.4 km	MPC · JPL
793877	2005 SD_{249}	—	September 30, 2005	Mount Lemmon	Mount Lemmon Survey	·	1.3 km	MPC · JPL
793878	2005 SG_{254}	—	September 14, 2005	Kitt Peak	Spacewatch	·	900 m	MPC · JPL
793879	2005 SZ_{256}	—	September 23, 2005	Kitt Peak	Spacewatch	MAS	590 m	MPC · JPL
793880	2005 SA_{259}	—	September 24, 2005	Kitt Peak	Spacewatch	·	1.7 km	MPC · JPL
793881	2005 SD_{261}	—	September 26, 2005	Kitt Peak	Spacewatch	·	1.9 km	MPC · JPL
793882	2005 SJ_{267}	—	September 29, 2005	Mount Lemmon	Mount Lemmon Survey	EUN	930 m	MPC · JPL
793883	2005 SG_{271}	—	September 30, 2005	Mount Lemmon	Mount Lemmon Survey	·	1.8 km	MPC · JPL
793884	2005 SL_{272}	—	September 29, 2005	Kitt Peak	Spacewatch	·	1.0 km	MPC · JPL
793885	2005 SA_{273}	—	September 30, 2005	Kitt Peak	Spacewatch	·	750 m	MPC · JPL
793886	2005 SC_{274}	—	September 29, 2005	Kitt Peak	Spacewatch	·	1.6 km	MPC · JPL
793887	2005 SH_{281}	—	September 30, 2005	Mount Lemmon	Mount Lemmon Survey	·	910 m	MPC · JPL
793888	2005 SJ_{283}	—	October 1, 2005	Sacramento Peak	SDSS Collaboration	·	1.8 km	MPC · JPL
793889	2005 SC_{284}	—	September 27, 2005	Sacramento Peak	SDSS Collaboration	·	1.3 km	MPC · JPL
793890	2005 ST_{285}	—	November 3, 2005	Catalina	CSS	T_{j} (2.98)	2.5 km	MPC · JPL
793891	2005 ST_{286}	—	October 1, 2005	Sacramento Peak	SDSS Collaboration	VER	1.4 km	MPC · JPL
793892	2005 SL_{288}	—	October 1, 2005	Sacramento Peak	SDSS Collaboration	·	1.7 km	MPC · JPL
793893	2005 SR_{288}	—	October 1, 2005	Sacramento Peak	SDSS Collaboration	EOS	1.4 km	MPC · JPL
793894	2005 SV_{291}	—	September 26, 2005	Kitt Peak	Spacewatch	·	1.3 km	MPC · JPL
793895	2005 SK_{295}	—	September 27, 2005	Palomar Mountain	NEAT	·	1.4 km	MPC · JPL
793896	2005 SR_{296}	—	September 23, 2005	Kitt Peak	Spacewatch	·	780 m	MPC · JPL
793897	2005 SY_{302}	—	September 30, 2005	Palomar Mountain	NEAT	·	2.4 km	MPC · JPL
793898	2005 SP_{303}	—	September 30, 2005	Mount Lemmon	Mount Lemmon Survey	·	850 m	MPC · JPL
793899	2005 SA_{304}	—	September 25, 2005	Kitt Peak	Spacewatch	·	1.7 km	MPC · JPL
793900	2005 SS_{304}	—	September 30, 2005	Mount Lemmon	Mount Lemmon Survey	·	1.4 km	MPC · JPL

== 793901–794000 ==
back to top

Designation			Discovery			Properties		Ref
Permanent	Provisional	Named after	Date	Site	Discoverer(s)	Category	Diam.	Ref
793901	2005 TQ	—	October 2, 2005	Siding Spring	SSS	·	1.3 km	MPC · JPL
793902	2005 TP_{4}	—	October 1, 2005	Mount Lemmon	Mount Lemmon Survey	·	1.1 km	MPC · JPL
793903	2005 TK_{20}	—	September 1, 2005	Kitt Peak	Spacewatch	·	1.7 km	MPC · JPL
793904	2005 TJ_{21}	—	August 30, 2005	Palomar Mountain	NEAT	·	1.1 km	MPC · JPL
793905	2005 TK_{29}	—	October 2, 2005	Mount Lemmon	Mount Lemmon Survey	·	820 m	MPC · JPL
793906	2005 TL_{30}	—	September 25, 2005	Junk Bond	D. Healy	·	500 m	MPC · JPL
793907	2005 TO_{37}	—	October 1, 2005	Mount Lemmon	Mount Lemmon Survey	·	1.7 km	MPC · JPL
793908	2005 TZ_{37}	—	October 1, 2005	Mount Lemmon	Mount Lemmon Survey	·	1.7 km	MPC · JPL
793909	2005 TP_{44}	—	October 1, 2005	Mount Lemmon	Mount Lemmon Survey	·	1.5 km	MPC · JPL
793910	2005 TO_{46}	—	September 29, 2005	Palomar Mountain	NEAT	H	490 m	MPC · JPL
793911	2005 TG_{58}	—	October 1, 2005	Mount Lemmon	Mount Lemmon Survey	·	1.8 km	MPC · JPL
793912	2005 TK_{80}	—	September 23, 2005	Kitt Peak	Spacewatch	·	1.5 km	MPC · JPL
793913	2005 TA_{121}	—	September 25, 2005	Kitt Peak	Spacewatch	·	950 m	MPC · JPL
793914	2005 TO_{126}	—	October 7, 2005	Kitt Peak	Spacewatch	HOF	1.6 km	MPC · JPL
793915	2005 TZ_{128}	—	September 29, 2005	Mount Lemmon	Mount Lemmon Survey	·	980 m	MPC · JPL
793916	2005 TW_{136}	—	October 6, 2005	Kitt Peak	Spacewatch	(5)	1.1 km	MPC · JPL
793917	2005 TC_{146}	—	October 8, 2005	Kitt Peak	Spacewatch	·	1.5 km	MPC · JPL
793918	2005 TH_{157}	—	October 9, 2005	Kitt Peak	Spacewatch	VER	1.8 km	MPC · JPL
793919	2005 TU_{157}	—	October 9, 2005	Kitt Peak	Spacewatch	·	940 m	MPC · JPL
793920	2005 TK_{158}	—	September 30, 2005	Mount Lemmon	Mount Lemmon Survey	·	1.6 km	MPC · JPL
793921	2005 TG_{177}	—	September 1, 2005	Campo Imperatore	CINEOS	T_{j} (2.95)	2.6 km	MPC · JPL
793922	2005 TY_{192}	—	October 1, 2005	Sacramento Peak	SDSS Collaboration	·	1.8 km	MPC · JPL
793923	2005 TX_{195}	—	October 2, 2005	Mount Lemmon	Mount Lemmon Survey	·	2.3 km	MPC · JPL
793924	2005 TZ_{195}	—	October 6, 2005	Kitt Peak	Spacewatch	·	2.1 km	MPC · JPL
793925	2005 TN_{204}	—	October 11, 2005	Kitt Peak	Spacewatch	H	370 m	MPC · JPL
793926	2005 TT_{204}	—	October 1, 2005	Mount Lemmon	Mount Lemmon Survey	·	2.3 km	MPC · JPL
793927	2005 TW_{207}	—	October 1, 2005	Kitt Peak	Spacewatch	·	1.0 km	MPC · JPL
793928	2005 TX_{207}	—	October 28, 2017	Haleakala	Pan-STARRS 1	·	1.9 km	MPC · JPL
793929	2005 TZ_{207}	—	October 27, 2016	Mount Lemmon	Mount Lemmon Survey	H	420 m	MPC · JPL
793930	2005 TZ_{209}	—	October 1, 2005	Kitt Peak	Spacewatch	·	1.1 km	MPC · JPL
793931	2005 TO_{210}	—	February 28, 2014	Haleakala	Pan-STARRS 1	EOS	1.4 km	MPC · JPL
793932	2005 TT_{210}	—	April 29, 2014	Haleakala	Pan-STARRS 1	EOS	1.4 km	MPC · JPL
793933	2005 TY_{212}	—	January 2, 2016	Mount Lemmon	Mount Lemmon Survey	HOF	1.7 km	MPC · JPL
793934	2005 TU_{213}	—	October 1, 2005	Catalina	CSS	·	730 m	MPC · JPL
793935	2005 TZ_{215}	—	October 1, 2005	Mount Lemmon	Mount Lemmon Survey	MAS	490 m	MPC · JPL
793936	2005 TA_{219}	—	October 1, 2005	Mount Lemmon	Mount Lemmon Survey	·	2.0 km	MPC · JPL
793937	2005 TL_{219}	—	October 11, 2005	Kitt Peak	Spacewatch	·	1.1 km	MPC · JPL
793938	2005 TM_{219}	—	October 1, 2005	Mount Lemmon	Mount Lemmon Survey	·	1.2 km	MPC · JPL
793939	2005 TB_{220}	—	October 7, 2005	Mount Lemmon	Mount Lemmon Survey	·	1.9 km	MPC · JPL
793940	2005 TD_{223}	—	October 1, 2005	Mount Lemmon	Mount Lemmon Survey	·	2.2 km	MPC · JPL
793941	2005 TK_{225}	—	October 1, 2005	Mount Lemmon	Mount Lemmon Survey	·	1.8 km	MPC · JPL
793942	2005 TQ_{225}	—	October 7, 2005	Mount Lemmon	Mount Lemmon Survey	HOF	1.6 km	MPC · JPL
793943	2005 TC_{226}	—	October 1, 2005	Mount Lemmon	Mount Lemmon Survey	·	1.4 km	MPC · JPL
793944	2005 TA_{227}	—	October 1, 2005	Mount Lemmon	Mount Lemmon Survey	·	2.9 km	MPC · JPL
793945	2005 UC_{20}	—	October 1, 2005	Mount Lemmon	Mount Lemmon Survey	·	1.0 km	MPC · JPL
793946	2005 UZ_{21}	—	October 23, 2005	Kitt Peak	Spacewatch	·	2.3 km	MPC · JPL
793947	2005 UQ_{45}	—	October 22, 2005	Catalina	CSS	·	760 m	MPC · JPL
793948	2005 UN_{58}	—	October 24, 2005	Kitt Peak	Spacewatch	·	1.4 km	MPC · JPL
793949	2005 UX_{61}	—	October 25, 2005	Mount Lemmon	Mount Lemmon Survey	·	1.1 km	MPC · JPL
793950	2005 UW_{64}	—	October 1, 2005	Mount Lemmon	Mount Lemmon Survey	AMO	500 m	MPC · JPL
793951	2005 UG_{78}	—	October 25, 2005	Mount Lemmon	Mount Lemmon Survey	EUN	820 m	MPC · JPL
793952	2005 UG_{96}	—	October 22, 2005	Kitt Peak	Spacewatch	·	1.2 km	MPC · JPL
793953	2005 UW_{96}	—	October 22, 2005	Kitt Peak	Spacewatch	THM	1.6 km	MPC · JPL
793954	2005 UJ_{99}	—	October 22, 2005	Kitt Peak	Spacewatch	·	1.3 km	MPC · JPL
793955	2005 UT_{134}	—	October 25, 2005	Kitt Peak	Spacewatch	·	1.9 km	MPC · JPL
793956	2005 UE_{137}	—	October 1, 2005	Mount Lemmon	Mount Lemmon Survey	MAS	550 m	MPC · JPL
793957	2005 UA_{138}	—	October 25, 2005	Mount Lemmon	Mount Lemmon Survey	·	1.1 km	MPC · JPL
793958	2005 UF_{145}	—	October 26, 2005	Kitt Peak	Spacewatch	VER	2.1 km	MPC · JPL
793959	2005 UB_{147}	—	October 26, 2005	Kitt Peak	Spacewatch	·	1.4 km	MPC · JPL
793960	2005 UP_{148}	—	October 26, 2005	Kitt Peak	Spacewatch	·	1.1 km	MPC · JPL
793961	2005 UN_{149}	—	October 26, 2005	Kitt Peak	Spacewatch	·	1.8 km	MPC · JPL
793962	2005 UO_{157}	—	October 30, 2005	Socorro	LINEAR	AMO	750 m	MPC · JPL
793963	2005 UE_{166}	—	October 24, 2005	Kitt Peak	Spacewatch	KOR	930 m	MPC · JPL
793964	2005 UN_{168}	—	October 24, 2005	Kitt Peak	Spacewatch	ELF	2.2 km	MPC · JPL
793965	2005 UQ_{183}	—	October 25, 2005	Mount Lemmon	Mount Lemmon Survey	(1547)	1.1 km	MPC · JPL
793966	2005 UF_{184}	—	October 25, 2005	Mount Lemmon	Mount Lemmon Survey	·	1.0 km	MPC · JPL
793967	2005 UX_{184}	—	October 25, 2005	Mount Lemmon	Mount Lemmon Survey	H	410 m	MPC · JPL
793968	2005 UT_{188}	—	October 27, 2005	Mount Lemmon	Mount Lemmon Survey	·	750 m	MPC · JPL
793969	2005 UJ_{194}	—	October 1, 2005	Mount Lemmon	Mount Lemmon Survey	MAS	600 m	MPC · JPL
793970	2005 UH_{203}	—	October 25, 2005	Mount Lemmon	Mount Lemmon Survey	·	2.0 km	MPC · JPL
793971	2005 UV_{206}	—	October 27, 2005	Kitt Peak	Spacewatch	THM	1.7 km	MPC · JPL
793972	2005 UJ_{209}	—	October 27, 2005	Mount Lemmon	Mount Lemmon Survey	·	1.2 km	MPC · JPL
793973	2005 US_{209}	—	October 27, 2005	Mount Lemmon	Mount Lemmon Survey	·	1.9 km	MPC · JPL
793974	2005 UD_{211}	—	October 27, 2005	Kitt Peak	Spacewatch	·	940 m	MPC · JPL
793975	2005 UM_{211}	—	October 27, 2005	Kitt Peak	Spacewatch	·	1.0 km	MPC · JPL
793976	2005 UT_{212}	—	October 27, 2005	Kitt Peak	Spacewatch	·	1.1 km	MPC · JPL
793977	2005 UJ_{234}	—	October 25, 2005	Kitt Peak	Spacewatch	·	850 m	MPC · JPL
793978	2005 UX_{236}	—	October 25, 2005	Kitt Peak	Spacewatch	·	780 m	MPC · JPL
793979	2005 UL_{270}	—	October 11, 2005	Kitt Peak	Spacewatch	NYS	820 m	MPC · JPL
793980	2005 UA_{276}	—	October 24, 2005	Kitt Peak	Spacewatch	·	2.1 km	MPC · JPL
793981	2005 UH_{316}	—	October 25, 2005	Mount Lemmon	Mount Lemmon Survey	·	930 m	MPC · JPL
793982	2005 UE_{322}	—	October 27, 2005	Kitt Peak	Spacewatch	·	1.3 km	MPC · JPL
793983	2005 UX_{328}	—	October 28, 2005	Mount Lemmon	Mount Lemmon Survey	·	1.2 km	MPC · JPL
793984	2005 UM_{331}	—	October 1, 2005	Kitt Peak	Spacewatch	·	770 m	MPC · JPL
793985	2005 UC_{333}	—	October 29, 2005	Mount Lemmon	Mount Lemmon Survey	·	1.0 km	MPC · JPL
793986	2005 UK_{338}	—	October 1, 2005	Mount Lemmon	Mount Lemmon Survey	·	1.0 km	MPC · JPL
793987	2005 US_{363}	—	October 27, 2005	Kitt Peak	Spacewatch	·	1.1 km	MPC · JPL
793988	2005 UB_{366}	—	October 27, 2005	Kitt Peak	Spacewatch	·	1.3 km	MPC · JPL
793989	2005 UG_{369}	—	October 27, 2005	Kitt Peak	Spacewatch	·	880 m	MPC · JPL
793990	2005 UV_{370}	—	October 27, 2005	Kitt Peak	Spacewatch	·	2.2 km	MPC · JPL
793991	2005 UN_{377}	—	October 28, 2005	Mount Lemmon	Mount Lemmon Survey	·	1.2 km	MPC · JPL
793992	2005 UP_{380}	—	October 1, 2005	Mount Lemmon	Mount Lemmon Survey	·	1.1 km	MPC · JPL
793993	2005 UK_{389}	—	October 29, 2005	Mount Lemmon	Mount Lemmon Survey	·	2.0 km	MPC · JPL
793994	2005 UN_{389}	—	September 29, 2005	Mount Lemmon	Mount Lemmon Survey	(5)	830 m	MPC · JPL
793995	2005 UO_{389}	—	October 29, 2005	Mount Lemmon	Mount Lemmon Survey	·	1.1 km	MPC · JPL
793996	2005 UC_{390}	—	October 29, 2005	Mount Lemmon	Mount Lemmon Survey	·	1.1 km	MPC · JPL
793997	2005 UZ_{390}	—	October 1, 2005	Mount Lemmon	Mount Lemmon Survey	V	470 m	MPC · JPL
793998	2005 US_{396}	—	September 30, 2005	Mount Lemmon	Mount Lemmon Survey	·	1.0 km	MPC · JPL
793999	2005 US_{401}	—	October 27, 2005	Kitt Peak	Spacewatch	KOR	1.0 km	MPC · JPL
794000	2005 UN_{403}	—	October 7, 2005	Kitt Peak	Spacewatch	·	2.1 km	MPC · JPL

back to top
