= Neith (hypothetical moon) =

Hypothetical moon of Venus

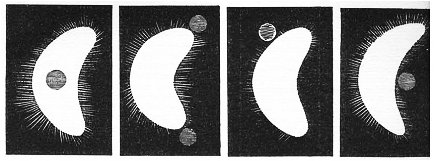
Francesco Fontana's drawing of the supposed satellite(s) of Venus. Woodcuts from Fontana's work. The fringes of light around Venus are produced by optical effects

Neith is a hypothetical natural satellite of Venus reportedly sighted by Giovanni Cassini in 1672 and by several other astronomers in following years. It was 'observed' up to 30 times by astronomers until 1770, when there were no new sightings and it was not found during the transit of Venus in 1761 and 1769. Actually the name "Neith" was given at the end of the XIX Century to a missing planet, hypotesized by Jean-Charles Houzeau, as an alternative to the moon of Venus. But the moon itself is sometimes referred to as Neith.

Observations published in 2009 by Scott Sheppard and Chad Trujillo with the Las Campanas Observatory in Chile, ruled out the possibility that Venus has satellites greater than 1 km in diameter.

== Discovery ==
The first report of a moon of Venus was in 1645, by the Italian astronomer Francesco Fontana. He wrote: "This is a new discovery not yet published in my opinion. But it is true that they do not always appear, but only when Venus is shimmering.[] These little dots were...not always seen in the same situation on Venus, but they moved back and forth like fish in the sea."

In 1672, Giovanni Cassini found a small object close to Venus. He did not take great note of his observation, but when he saw it again in 1686, he made a formal announcement of a possible moon of Venus. The object was seen by many other astronomers over a large period of time: by James Short in 1740, by Andreas Mayer in 1759, by Louis Lagrange in 1761, another eighteen observations in 1761, including the one by Abraham Scheuten in which a small spot was seen following Venus while the planet was in a transit across the Sun, eight observations in 1764, and by Christian Horrebow in 1768.

== Summary of sightings ==
Year	City	Person	Number of sightings
1645	Naples	Francesco Fontana	3
1646	Naples	Francesco Fontana	1
1672	Paris	Giovanni Domenico Cassini	1
1686	Paris	Giovanni Domenico Cassini	1
1740	London	James Short	1
1759	Greifswald	Andreas Mayer	1
1761	Marseille	Joseph Lagrange	3
1761	Limoges	Jacques Montaingne	4
1761	St. Neots	unknown	1
1761	Greifswald	Friedrich Artzt	1
1761	Krefeld	Abraham Scheuten	2
1761	Copenhagen	Peter Roedkiær	8
1764	Copenhagen	Peter Roedkiær	2
1764	Copenhagen	Christian Horrebow and others	3
1764	Auxerre	Marian	3
1768	Copenhagen	Christian Horrebow	1

== Observations ==
Many astronomers failed to find any moon during their observations of Venus, including William Herschel in 1768. Cassini originally observed Neith to be one-fourth the diameter of Venus. In 1761, Lagrange announced that Neith's orbital plane was perpendicular to the ecliptic. That same year, however, mathematician Jean le Rond d'Alembert wrote to Voltaire that Neith had "declined to follow his mistress during her passage over the sun", questioning whether Venus truly had a moon. In 1766, the director of the Vienna Observatory speculated that the observations of the moon were optical illusions. He said: "the bright image of Venus was reflected in the eye and back into the telescope, creating a smaller secondary image." In 1777, J.H. Lambert estimated its orbital period as eleven days and three hours.

In 1884, Jean-Charles Houzeau, the former director of the Royal Observatory of Brussels suggested that the "moon" was actually a planet which orbited the Sun every 283 days. Such a planet would be in conjunction with Venus every 1080 days, which fit with the recorded observations. Houzeau was also the first to give the object the name Neith, after an Egyptian goddess.

The Belgian Academy of Sciences published a paper in 1887 which studied each reported sighting of Neith. Ultimately, they determined that most of the sightings could be explained by stars which had been in the vicinity of Venus, including Chi Orionis, M Tauri, 71 Orionis, Nu Geminorum and Theta Librae.

To date, among the space missions sent to Venus, none has retrieved evidence of a natural satellite orbiting the planet.

== See also ==
- List of hypothetical astronomical objects
- 524522 Zoozve, a quasi-satellite of Venus
- 2013 ND_{15}, a temporary trojan of Venus
