= Sinus Roris =

Moon feature

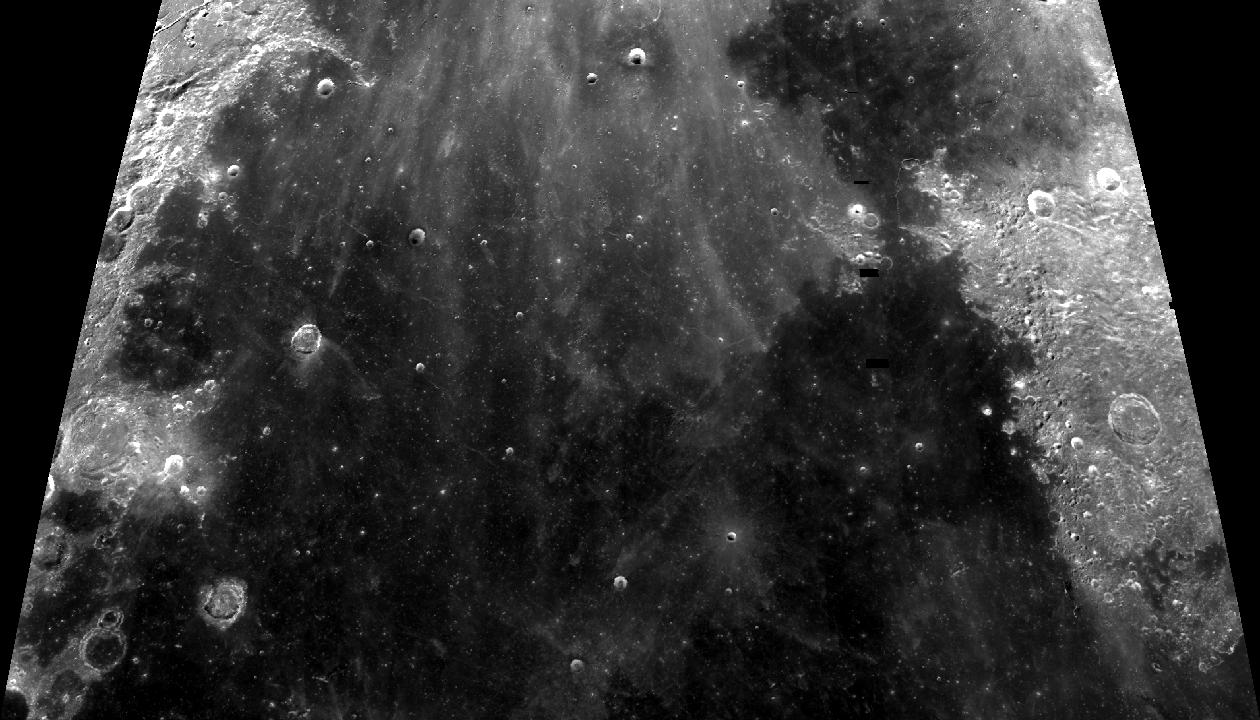
- Coordinates: 54.0°N 56.6°W
- Diameter: 202 km
- Eponym: Bay of Dew

Sinus Roris /ˈsaɪnəs ˈrɔːrɪs/ (Latin sinus rōris "Bay of Dew") is a dark, basaltic plain on the near side of the Moon that forms an extension of the northern edge of Oceanus Procellarum. The IAU-defined selenographic coordinates of this bay are 54.0° N, 56.6° W, and the diameter is 202 km.

== Characteristics ==
Following traditional nomenclature for the Moon, this feature was named sinus (bay) because of its small size, but it possesses many of the same characteristics as a lunar mare (sea). Like other maria (including Oceanus Procellarum), it is a dark, basaltic area on the near side of the Moon believed to be formed by impact craters that later filled with magma, which then hardened into smooth, dark plains.

The borders of this feature are somewhat indistinct. The bay proper is framed along the western edge by the craters Markov and Oenopides, and to the north by Babbage and South. At the eastern edge it joins the Mare Frigoris.

Many selenographers have taken liberties with the dimensions of Sinus Roris. Lunar maps often indicate a much larger region for this bay than the official dimensions. These can range out as far as the craters Gerard and Repsold to the west, Harpalus to the east, and as far south as 44° N latitude, approaching Mons Rümker.

The area where the official coordinates place this bay has a generally higher albedo than the mare to the south, most likely due to deposits of ejecta from impacts to the north.

Early concepts of a Moon landing promoted by Wernher von Braun envisaged the establishment of a permanent lunar base in the Sinus Roris region. These concepts lead, in much modified form, to Project Apollo.

Arthur C. Clarke's 1961 novel A Fall of Moondust is set in a fictional "Sea of Thirst" located within Sinus Roris.

== See also ==
- Volcanism on the Moon
