= Foucault (crater) =

Crater on the Moon

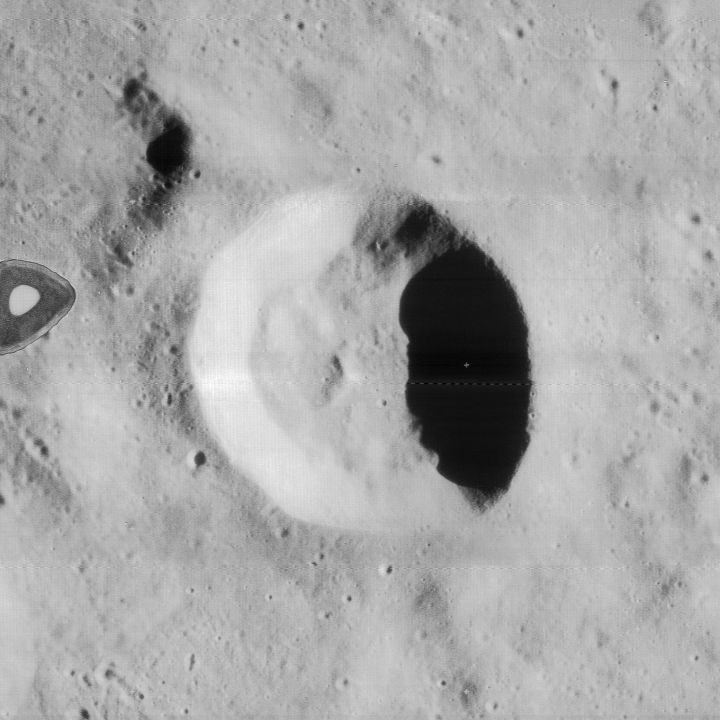
- Lunar Orbiter 4 image (triangular mark at left is blemish on original)
- Coordinates: 50.4°N 39.7°W
- Diameter: 25.08 km (15.58 mi)
- Depth: 2.1 km (1.3 mi)
- Colongitude: 40° at sunrise
- Eponym: Léon Foucault

Foucault is a small lunar impact crater that lies near the southern edge of Mare Frigoris, to the southeast of the crater Harpalus. To the west is the lunar mare named Sinus Roris. In the rugged terrain to the south of Foucault is Sharp.

The outer perimeter of Foucault forms a somewhat irregular circle, with slight outward bulges to the south and northeast. The inner wall of the rim is not notably terraced, and slopes down directly to the uneven floor.

This formation is named after French physicist Léon Foucault (1819-1868), most famous for the Foucault pendulum. His name was introduced into lunar nomenclature by William R. Birt during the 19th century. Its designation was officially adopted by the International Astronomical Union in 1935.
