= Venus trojan =

Asteroid with which Venus shares its orbit around the Sun

Simulation of 2013 ND_{15}’s orbit relative to Sun and Venus Sun · Venus · 2013 ND_{15}

A Venus trojan is an asteroid that orbits the Sun in the vicinity of Venus. Trojans travel in Venus-Sun Lagrangian points L_{4}, leading 60°, or L_{5}, trailing 60°. 2013 ND15 is the only known trojan of Venus, and is located near Venus's Lagrangian point L_{4}. While 524522 Zoozve is currently a quasi-satellite of Venus, it is expected to be ejected from that configuration and become a Venus trojan orbiting at Venus' L_{5} point in about 500 years.

List of Venus trojans
Designation	Cloud	Semimajor axis (AU)	Perihelion (AU)	Eccentricity	Inclination (°)	(H)	Diameter (m)
2013 ND15	L4	1.20	0.72	0.39	2.65	18.3	70±30

== Exploration ==
The only known temporary trojan of Venus is 2013 ND_{15}. It orbits Venus in a tadpole orbit around Venus's Lagrangian point L_{4}. The asteroid was discovered in July 2013 by N. Primak, A. Schultz, T. Goggia and K. Chambers, observing for the Pan-STARRS project.

As of September 2014, the asteroid had been observed 21 times over a data-arc span of 26 days. It is classified as an Aten asteroid, and its semi-major axis is 0.7235 astronomical units (AU) closely matches that of Venus. However, it has a high eccentricity of 0.6115 and a low orbital inclination of 4.794°. With an absolute magnitude of 24.1, its estimated diameter ranges between 40 and 100 meters, based on an assumed albedo range of 0.04 to 0.20.

In addition to being a Venus co-orbital, the asteroid is also a Mercury-crosser and Earth-crosser. 2013 ND_{15} shows resonant or near-resonant orbital behavior with Mercury, Venus, and Earth. Its short-term orbital behavior differs from the other three known Venus co-orbitals: (322756) 2001 CK32, 524522 Zoozve, and 2012 XE_{133}.

According to a Minor Planet Center list, it does not list 2013 ND_{15} as a potentially hazardous asteroid (PHA), as it has only passed 0.077 AU from Earth on 21 June 2016.

== See also ==
- Trojan (celestial body)
- Earth trojan
- Mars trojan
- Jupiter trojan
- Uranus trojan
- Neptune trojan
