= Harpalus (crater) =

Crater on the Moon

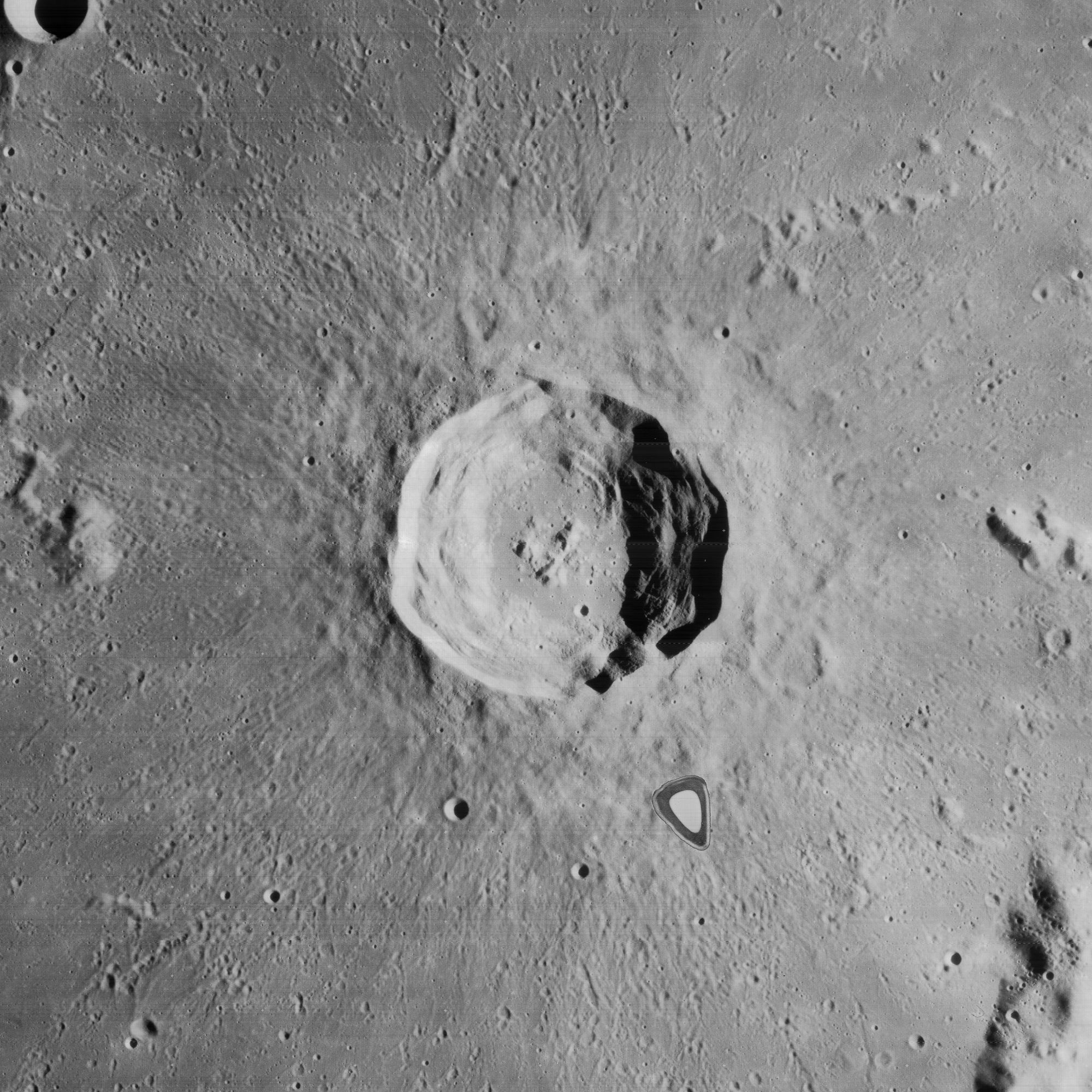
- Lunar Orbiter 4 image (triangular mark below right of crater is blemish on original)
- Coordinates: 52.6°N 43.4°W
- Diameter: 39 km
- Depth: 2.9 km
- Colongitude: 44° at sunrise
- Eponym: Harpalus

Harpalus is a young lunar impact crater that lies on the Mare Frigoris, at the eastern edge of the Sinus Roris. To the southeast at the edge of the mare is the small crater Foucault, and to the northwest on the opposite edge is the walled plain named South.

The rim of Harpalus is sharp-edged with little sign of wear or erosion. The wall is not perfectly circular, and has a few outward notches and protrusions, especially along the eastern half. It is surrounded by an outer rampart of ejecta, most notably towards the north, and is at the center of a small ray system. Due to its rays, Harpalus is mapped as part of the Copernican System.

The inner surface is terraced, and flows down to the floor. The interior wall is the least wide along the northern face, making the floor slightly offset in that direction. Near the midpoint is a system of low central ridges.

== Popular culture references ==
Harpalus was the rocket landing site in the 1950s science fiction film Destination Moon. It was chosen by artist Chesley Bonestell as it had a relatively high latitude and the Earth could be realistically displayed at a low altitude during camera shots. However, the resulting clay model depicted crazing (net-like cracks) across the crater floor, an addition to which Bonestell objected.

== Satellite craters ==
By convention, these features are identified on lunar maps by placing the letter on the side of the crater midpoint that is closest to Harpalus.

| Harpalus | Latitude | Longitude | Diameter |
|---|---|---|---|
| B | 56.2° N | 43.7° W | 8 km |
| C | 55.5° N | 45.1° W | 10 km |
| E | 52.7° N | 50.8° W | 7 km |
| G | 53.6° N | 52.3° W | 11 km |
| H | 53.8° N | 53.2° W | 8 km |
| S | 51.4° N | 49.9° W | 5 km |
| T | 50.0° N | 49.4° W | 4 km |
