= Horrebow (crater) =

Crater on the Moon

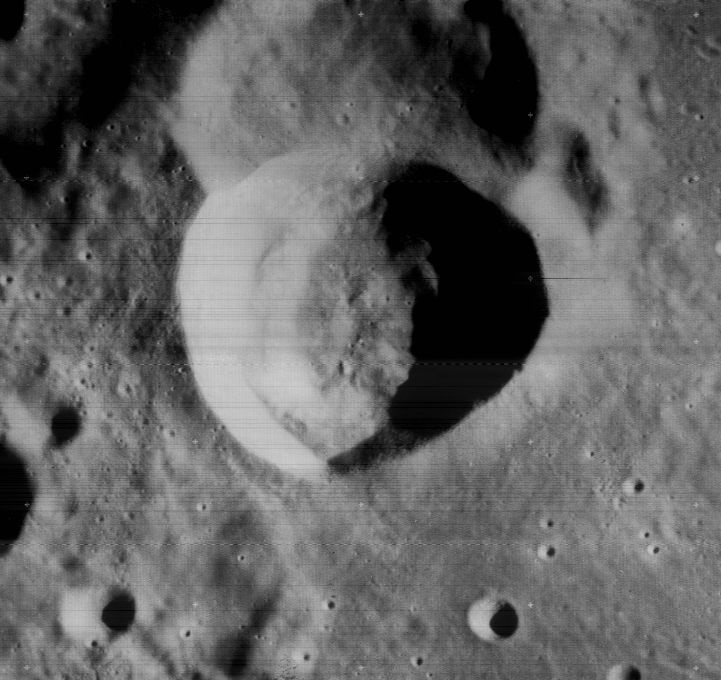
- Lunar Orbiter 4 image
- Coordinates: 58.7°N 40.8°W
- Diameter: 24 km
- Depth: 2.5 km
- Colongitude: 41° at sunrise
- Eponym: Peder Horrebow

Horrebow is a lunar impact crater that is located along the northern shore of Mare Frigoris, just to the south of a walled plain named J. Herschel. To the west of Horrebow is the crater Robinson.

The crater is named after Danish astronomer Peder Horrebow.

Horrebow is roughly circular, but it has a narrower inner wall along the east and southeast sides than elsewhere around the perimeter. The inner walls have slumped, forming a ledge around the base of the slope. The interior floor is circular, but is offset to the east due to the asymmetry of the wall. The rim of the crater is sharp-edged, and is not significantly eroded.

The crater overlies the southwest part of a similar-sized crater with the designation Horrebow A. This satellite crater also joins the southeast rim of J. Herschel.

== Satellite craters ==
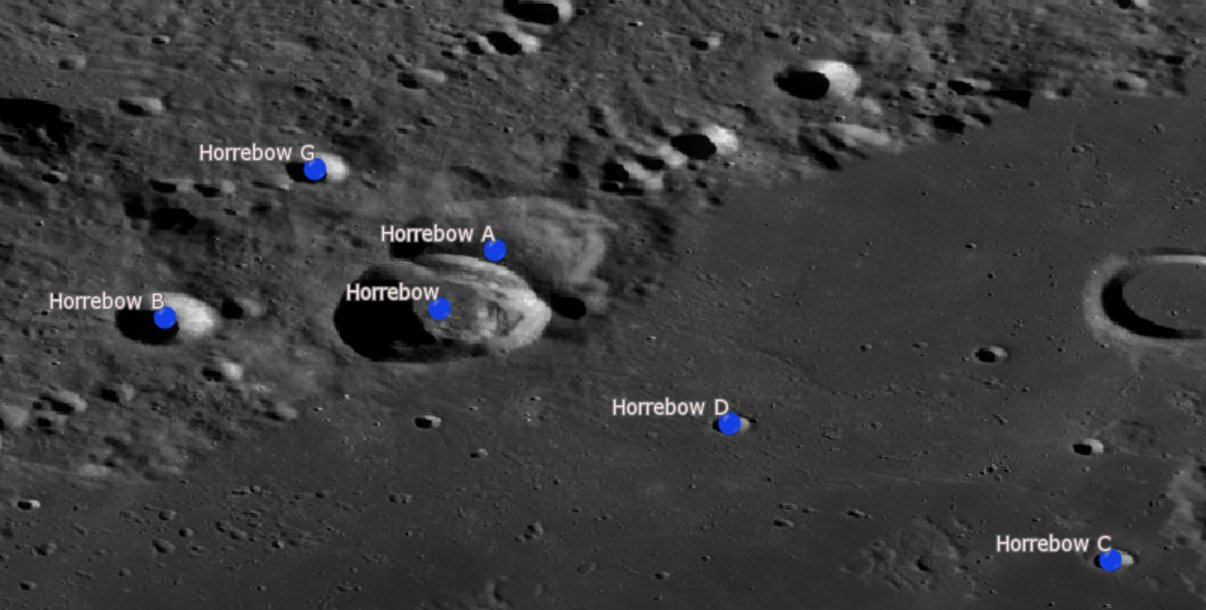
Horrebow and its satellite craters (LRO image from October 2010)

By convention these features are identified on lunar maps by placing the letter on the side of the crater midpoint that is closest to Horrebow.

| Horrebow | Latitude | Longitude | Diameter |
|---|---|---|---|
| A | 59.2° N | 40.4° W | 25 km |
| B | 58.7° N | 42.7° W | 13 km |
| C | 56.9° N | 36.0° W | 5 km |
| D | 57.9° N | 38.7° W | 5 km |
| G | 59.7° N | 41.7° W | 8 km |
