= Peder Horrebow =

Danish astronomer (1679–1764)

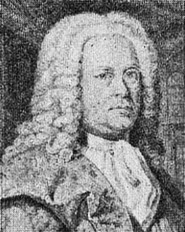
- Peder Horrebow
- Born: 14 May 1679; Løgstør, Jutland, Denmark
- Died: 15 April 1764 (aged 84); Copenhagen, Denmark
- Scientific career
- Fields: Astronomy

Peder [Nielsen] Horrebow (Horrebov) (14 May 1679 – 15 April 1764) was a Danish astronomer. Born in Løgstør, Jutland to a poor family of fishermen, Horrebow entered the University of Copenhagen in 1703. He worked his way through grammar school and university by virtue of his technical knowledge: he repaired mechanical and musical instruments and cut seals. He received his MA from the university in 1716, and his MD in 1725. From 1703 to 1707, he served as an assistant to Ole Rømer and lived in Rømer's home. He worked as a household tutor from 1707 to 1711 to a Danish baron, and entered the governmental bureaucracy as an excise writer in 1711.

After repeatedly petitioning King Frederick IV, Horrebow became professor of mathematics at the University of Copenhagen in 1714. He also became director of the university's observatory (called the Rundetårn, "the Round Tower"). His son Christian succeeded him in this position. Horrebow and his wife, Anne Margrethe Rossing, had a total of 20 children.

In 1728, the great fire of Copenhagen destroyed all of the papers and observations made by Rømer, who had died in 1710. Horrebow wrote the Basis Astronomiae (1734–35), which describes the scientific achievements made by Rømer. Horrebow's own papers and instruments were destroyed in the same fire. Horrebow was given a special grant from the government to repair the observatory and instruments. Horrebow received further support from a wealthy patron.

Horrebow invented a way to determine a place's latitude from the stars. The method fixed latitude by observing differences of zenith distances of stars culminating within a short time of each other, and at nearly the same altitude, on opposite sides of the zenith. The method was soon forgotten despite its value until it was rediscovered by the American Andrew Talcott in 1833. It is now called the Horrebow-Talcott Method.

He wrote on navigation and determined the sun parallax, 9", an approximative solution to the Kepler equation. Horrebow also learned how to correct inherent flaws in instruments. This preceded Tobias Mayer's theory of correction of 1756.

Horrebow was a member of a number of scientific societies, including the Académie des Sciences (from 1746). He also worked as a medical doctor and as an academic notary (from 1720).

He died in Copenhagen.

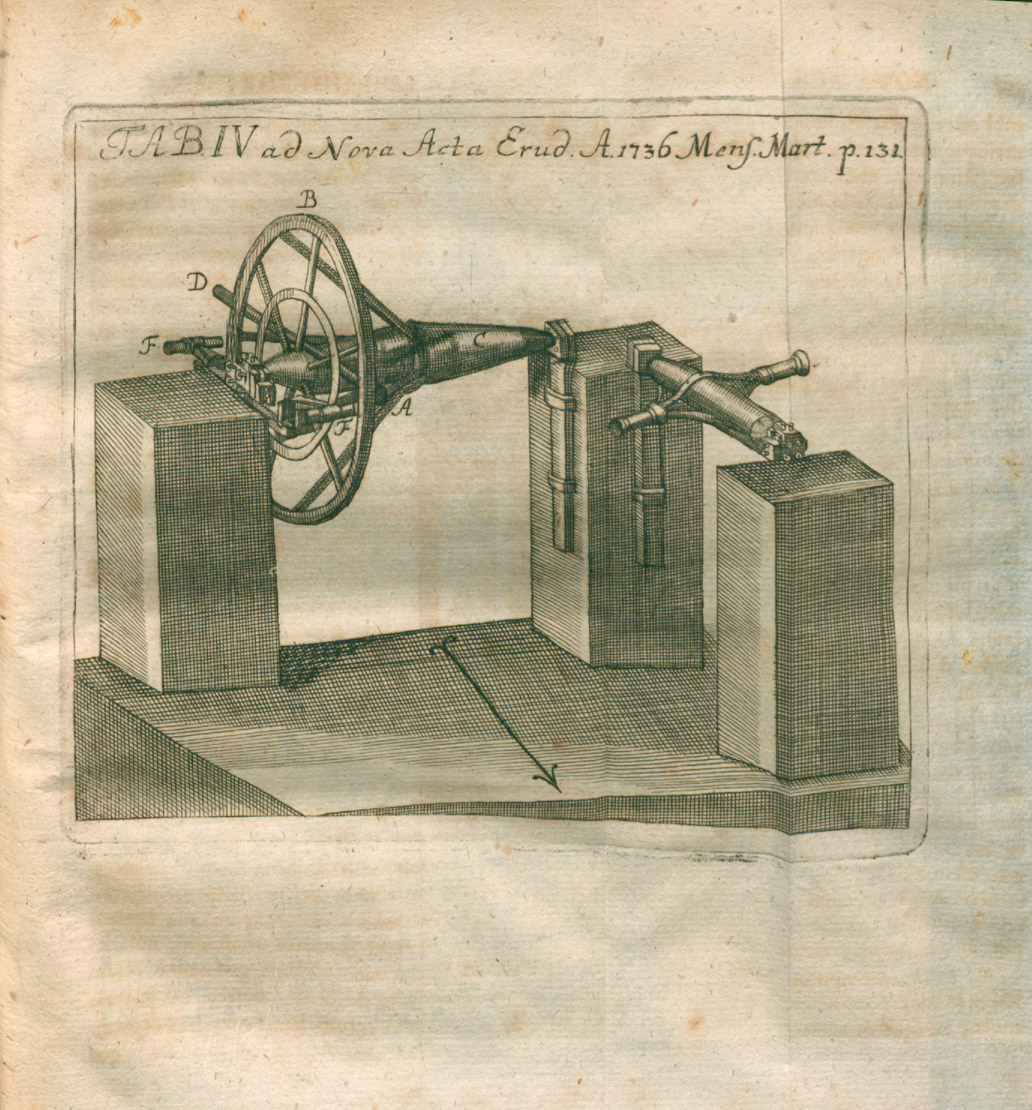
Illustration from Basis astronomiae sive Astronomiae pars mechanica... Acta Eruditorum, March 1736

The crater Horrebow on the Moon is named after him.

== Sources ==
- (in French) Imago Mundi: Peder Horrebow
- (in English) The Galileo Project: Peder Horrebow
- (in English) Astronomy in Denmark
