= Markov (crater) =

Crater on the Moon

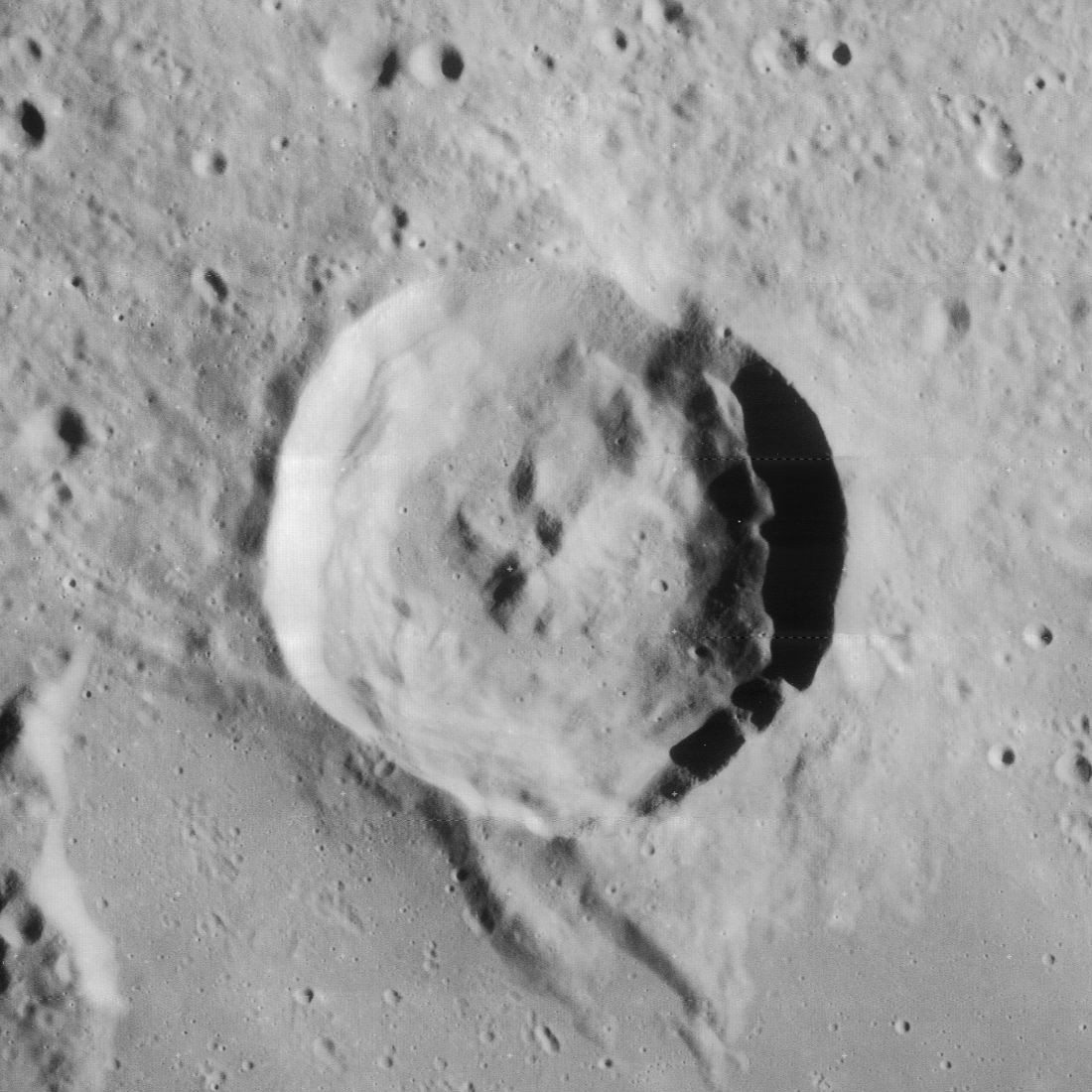
- Lunar Orbiter 4 image
- Coordinates: 53.4°N 62.7°W
- Diameter: 39.92 km (24.81 mi)
- Depth: Unknown
- Colongitude: 64° at sunrise
- Eponym: Andrei A. Markov (es); Andrei A. Markov

Markov is a lunar impact crater that is located in the northwestern part of the Moon’s near side, in the Sinus Roris region of the Oceanus Procellarum. It lies to the south of the crater Oenopides, and is connected to the continental region to the north by ridges along the northern rim.

The rim of this crater is not appreciably eroded by impacts, and retains a sharp edge at the crest. The perimeter is roughly circular, with some minor outward bulges particularly along the southern and eastern edge. The inner walls are simple slopes that continue down to a ring of debris along the base. The interior floor has a low central hill and some minor ridges. There are no craters of note within the interior or along the rim.

This crater is named after Russian astrophysicist Aleksandr V. Markov and Russian mathematician Andrei A. Markov (1856–1922). It designation was formally adopted by the International Astronomical Union in 1964.

== Satellite craters ==
By convention these features are identified on lunar maps by placing the letter on the side of the crater mid-point that is closest to Markov.

Markov	Latitude	Longitude	Diameter
E	50.6° N	60.1° W	13 km
F	50.0° N	61.8° W	8 km
G	50.0° N	56.2° W	5 km
U	51.9° N	60.2° W	29 km
