= 524522 Zoozve =

Temporary quasi-satellite of Venus

- Zoozve photographed by the Zwicky Transient Facility in November 2018

Discovery
- Discovered by: LONEOS
- Discovery site: Anderson Mesa Stn.
- Discovery date: 11 November 2002

Designations
- Pronunciation: /ˈzuːzviː/ or /ˈzuːzveɪ/
- Alternative designations: 2002 VE_{68}
- Minor planet category: Aten; NEO; PHA; quasi-satellite

Orbital characteristics
- Epoch 5 September 2014 (JD 2456905.5)
- Uncertainty parameter 0
- Observation arc: 16.06 yr (5,866 d)
- Aphelion: 1.0206 AU
- Perihelion: 0.4268 AU
- Semi-major axis: 0.7237 AU
- Eccentricity: 0.4103
- Orbital period (sidereal): 225 days
- Mean anomaly: 251.64°
- Mean motion: 1° 36^{m} 3.6^{s} / day
- Inclination: 9.0060°
- Longitude of ascending node: 231.58°
- Argument of perihelion: 355.45°
- Earth MOID: 0.027 AU (10.44 LD)

Physical characteristics
- Mean diameter: 236 m (calculated)
- Synodic rotation period: 13.50±0.01 h
- Geometric albedo: 0.20 (assumed)
- Spectral type: X; B–V = 0.690±0.041; V–R = 0.404±0.037; V–I = 0.751±0.039
- Absolute magnitude (H): 20.5; 20.59±0.02

524522 Zoozve (provisional designation 2002 VE_{68}) is a sub-kilometer sized asteroid and temporary quasi-satellite of Venus. Discovered in 2002, it was the first such object to be discovered around a major planet in the Solar System. It has nearly the same orbital period around the Sun that Venus does. In a frame of reference rotating with Venus, it appears to travel around it during one Venerean year, but it orbits the Sun, not Venus.

== Discovery, orbit and physical properties ==
Animation of Zoozve's current orbit from 2023 to 2025 – it has the same orbital period as Venus Sun · Mercury · Venus · Earth · 524522 Zoozve

Animation of Zoozve's orbit from 1600 to 2500 – relative to Sun and Venus: Sun · Mercury · Venus · Earth · 524522 Zoozve

Zoozve was discovered on 11 November 2002 by Brian A. Skiff at Lowell Observatory. As of February 2013, it has been observed telescopically 457 times with a data-arc span of 2,947 days, and it was the target of Doppler observations on five occasions; therefore, its orbit is very well determined. Its semi-major axis of 0.7237 AU is very similar to that of Venus, but its eccentricity is relatively large (0.4104), and its orbital inclination is also significant (9.0060°). The spectrum of Zoozve implies that it is an X-type asteroid and hence an albedo of about 0.25 should be assumed. The body is calculated to measure 236 meters in diameter. Its rotational period is 13.5 hours, and its light curve has an amplitude of 0.9 mag, which hints at a very elongated body, perhaps a contact binary.

== Quasi-satellite dynamical state and orbital evolution ==
The existence of retrograde satellites or quasi-satellites was first considered by J. Jackson in 1913 but none were discovered until almost 90 years later. Zoozve was the first quasi-satellite to be discovered, in 2002, although it was not immediately recognized as such. Zoozve was identified as a quasi-satellite of Venus by Seppo Mikkola, Ramon Brasser, Paul A. Wiegert and Kimmo Innanen in 2004, two years after the actual discovery of the object. From the perspective of a hypothetical observer in a frame of reference rotating with Venus, it appears to travel around the planet during one Venusian year. However, it does not orbit Venus, but instead orbits the Sun, like any other asteroid. As a quasi-satellite, this minor body is trapped in a 1:1 mean-motion resonance with Venus. Besides being a Venus co-orbital, this Aten asteroid is also a Mercury grazer and an Earth crosser. Zoozve exhibits resonant (or near-resonant) behavior with Mercury, Venus and Earth. It seems to have been co-orbital with Venus for only the last 7,000 years, and is destined to be ejected from this orbital arrangement about 500 years from now, where it will become a Venus trojan orbiting at Venus' L_{5} point. During this time, its distance to Venus has been and will remain larger than about 0.2 astronomical units (30,000,000 km; 19,000,000 mi).

== Potentially hazardous asteroid ==
Zoozve is included in the Minor Planet Center list of Potentially Hazardous Asteroids (PHAs) because it comes relatively frequently to within 0.05 AU of Earth. Approaches as close as 0.04 AU occur with a periodicity of 8 years due to its near 8:13 resonance with Earth. Zoozve was discovered during the close approaches of 11 November 2002. It approached Earth on 7 November 2010, again on 4 November 2018, and its next fly-by with Earth will happen on 2 November 2026 within 0.0402 AU (15.7 Lunar distances). Numerical simulations indicate that an actual collision with Earth during the next 10,000 years is not likely, although dangerously close approaches to about 0.002 AU are possible, a distance potentially within Earth's Hill sphere.

== Numbering and naming ==
This minor planet was numbered by the Minor Planet Center on 18 May 2019 (M.P.C. 114620).

On 26 January 2024, Radiolab aired an episode about the asteroid, which co-host Latif Nasser first noticed on his child's solar system poster, where it was referred to as "ZOOZVE", derived from the artist, Alex Foster, misreading his notes regarding the asteroid's provisional designation "2002VE". This led Skiff to propose the name "Zoozve", on Nasser's behalf, to the International Astronomical Union's Working Group Small Bodies Nomenclature (WGSBN). The name was approved and announced by the WGSBN on 5 February 2024.

== See also ==
- (322756) 2001 CK32
- 2012 XE133
- 2013 ND15
- 164207 Cardea
