= Paul Wiegert =

Canadian astronomer

Minor planets discovered: 85
see § List of discovered minor planets

Paul Arnold Wiegert (born 1967) is a Canadian astronomer, discoverer of minor planets and professor at the University of Western Ontario.

Wiegert studies unusual orbits of both observed objects and theorised classes of objects, for example, one early paper considers not-known-to-exist planets orbiting the nearby Alpha Centauri star system, while later papers extend that case to more general planetary stability in general binary systems (as exoplanet studies are finding increasingly frequently). This work in particular should be of interest to science fiction authors inventing universes.

Other areas of work include identifying the orbits of minor planets in the Solar System, which by virtue of their potential instability could realistically become major threats to civilization when one impacts on Earth again, as they have in the past. The Minor Planet Center credits him with the discovery of 80 numbered minor planets between 2003 and 2008. Wiegert was also involved in the discovery of 3753 Cruithne, Earth's first known Trojan asteroid.

He was also the a member of the team that identified 524522 Zoozve, as a quasi-satellite of Venus, in 2004, two years after the actual discovery of the object.

The outer main-belt asteroid 15068 Wiegert was named in his honor.

== List of discovered minor planets ==
172996 Stooke	25 May 2006	list
199763 Davidgregory	1 May 2006	list
204786 Wehlau	25 May 2006	list
(229280) 2005 BN_{47}	16 January 2005	list
233472 Moorcroft	25 May 2006	list
236616 Gray	1 May 2006	list
254422 Henrykent	9 November 2004	list^{[A]}
261930 Moorhead	25 May 2006	list
262536 Nowikow	26 October 2006	list^{[A]}
263251 Pandabear	6 January 2008	list^{[A]}
273230 de Bruyn	1 May 2006	list
273262 Cottam	25 May 2006	list
277883 Basu	1 May 2006	list
(281067) 2006 KU_{130}	25 May 2006	list
(282630) 2005 RL_{50}	3 September 2005	list
(290156) 2005 QL_{183}	27 August 2005	list
(290181) 2005 RZ_{50}	3 September 2005	list
(291824) 2006 KH_{133}	25 May 2006	list
(292856) 2006 UE_{341}	26 October 2006	list
(298762) 2004 HT_{77}	26 April 2004	list
(299518) 2006 CX_{63}	2 February 2006	list
(299631) 2006 JP_{68}	1 May 2006	list
304122 Ameliawehlau	1 May 2006	list
(304557) 2006 UL_{352}	26 October 2006	list
(305344) 2008 AB_{122}	6 January 2008	list

306257 Janethunten	25 May 2006	list
(307681) 2003 SA_{425}	25 September 2003	list
(308753) 2006 JD_{79}	1 May 2006	list
(309426) 2007 TX_{412}	25 May 2006	list
(311604) 2006 KD_{137}	25 May 2006	list
312676 Posner	19 January 2007	list
315529 Claudinefrieden	6 January 2008	list
(317843) 2003 SH_{424}	25 September 2003	list
(317844) 2003 SU_{426}	25 September 2003	list
(319358) 2006 CE_{64}	2 February 2006	list
(319455) 2006 KB_{142}	25 May 2006	list
(322569) 2011 YQ_{65}	14 September 2007	list
(324208) 2006 AS_{103}	7 January 2006	list
(324327) 2006 JB_{72}	1 May 2006	list
(327559) 2006 CS_{63}	2 February 2006	list
(331824) 2003 SU_{424}	25 September 2003	list
(335013) 2004 HW_{76}	26 April 2004	list
(339395) 2005 BA_{48}	16 January 2005	list
(340538) 2006 JJ_{73}	1 May 2006	list
(344700) 2003 SV_{423}	25 September 2003	list
(344918) 2004 RY_{347}	12 September 2004	list
(345702) 2006 UL_{357}	27 October 2006	list
(349018) 2006 UD_{352}	26 October 2006	list
(350205) 2012 QE_{2}	25 May 2006	list
(351475) 2005 PH_{27}	10 August 2005	list

(353730) 2011 WN_{114}	24 November 2005	list
(355145) 2006 UZ_{343}	26 October 2006	list
(358712) 2008 AO_{121}	6 January 2008	list
(360106) 2013 CM_{13}	25 May 2006	list
(362643) 2011 SZ_{185}	25 May 2006	list
(362683) 2011 UD_{93}	1 May 2006	list
(363834) 2005 PH_{25}	5 August 2005	list
(364179) 2006 KU_{138}	25 May 2006	list
(365879) 2011 UC_{318}	25 May 2006	list
(371548) 2006 UY_{349}	26 October 2006	list
(376299) 2011 FC_{138}	15 December 2004	list
(376303) 2011 FK_{148}	14 September 2007	list
(376674) 2013 QD_{29}	16 January 2005	list
(377395) 2004 RW_{349}	12 September 2004	list
(377959) 2006 JK_{61}	1 May 2006	list
(387984) 2005 ON_{29}	31 July 2005	list
(391240) 2006 KP_{134}	25 May 2006	list
(393652) 2004 PN_{116}	12 August 2004	list
(394654) 2008 AS_{120}	6 January 2008	list
(400015) 2006 KH_{126}	25 May 2006	list
(402361) 2005 VV_{134}	1 November 2005	list
(405285) 2003 SV_{424}	25 September 2003	list
(405915) 2006 JP_{70}	1 May 2006	list
(416605) 2004 PV_{116}	12 August 2004	list
(422054) 2014 QE_{366}	16 January 2005	list

(434357) 2004 RC_{350}	12 September 2004	list
(434709) 2006 CJ_{69}	3 February 2006	list^{[A]}
(438334) 2006 KD_{139}	25 May 2006	list
(441316) 2008 AV_{125}	6 January 2008	list
(444474) 2006 KL_{142}	25 May 2006	list
(470002) 2006 KW_{137}	25 May 2006	list
(476348) 2008 AT_{123}	6 January 2008	list
(489211) 2006 JH_{74}	1 May 2006	list
(493446) 2014 WJ_{361}	25 May 2006	list
(497593) 2006 JU_{69}	1 May 2006	list
(507444) 2012 ST_{49}	25 May 2006	list
(541500) 2011 PN_{13}	28 July 2007	list^{[B]}
(541586) 2011 TZ_{11}	25 May 2006	list
(542059) 2012 KT_{40}	2 February 2006	list
(542762) 2013 HU_{77}	5 August 2005	list^{[C]}
(546166) 2010 TG_{140}	14 February 2007	list
(546267) 2010 UP_{71}	19 July 2006	list^{[D]}
(546284) 2010 UR_{99}	14 February 2007	list
(546488) 2010 VN_{191}	19 January 2007	list
(550574) 2012 QT_{9}	19 January 2007	list
(553529) 2011 SA_{62}	15 January 2007	list
(553831) 2011 YH_{62}	19 July 2006	list^{[D]}
(554642) 2012 VB_{72}	3 September 2005	list
(554979) 2013 JN_{46}	26 April 2004	list^{[C]}
(555816) 2014 EV_{46}	10 August 2005	list^{[C]}

(557853) 2014 WA_{319}	15 January 2007	list
(560701) 2015 HL_{185}	6 January 2008	list^{[E]}
(560861) 2015 MR_{46}	14 February 2007	list
(561338) 2015 SG_{23}	19 July 2006	list^{[D]}
(562488) 2016 AU_{13}	15 January 2007	list
(563147) 2016 CV_{11}	19 January 2007	list
565039 Meganengel	15 December 2004	list^{[C]}
(565512) 2017 DK_{117}	14 September 2007	list
(566244) 2017 RV_{18}	14 September 2007	list
(566411) 2017 XL_{45}	15 January 2007	list
(566999) 2018 VM_{98}	26 October 2006	list
(568652) 2004 PL_{116}	12 August 2004	list
568959 Michaellesko	16 January 2005	list^{[C]}
(569196) 2005 PK_{27}	10 August 2005	list^{[C]}
(570087) 2006 CZ_{64}	2 February 2006	list
(570280) 2006 JS_{78}	1 May 2006	list
(570337) 2006 KQ_{131}	25 May 2006	list
(570338) 2006 KD_{134}	25 May 2006	list
(570339) 2006 KD_{138}	25 May 2006	list
(570363) 2006 OB_{27}	19 July 2006	list^{[D]}
(571047) 2007 AJ_{34}	15 January 2007	list
(571071) 2007 BF_{86}	19 January 2007	list
(571118) 2007 CZ_{67}	14 February 2007	list
(571119) 2007 CK_{69}	14 February 2007	list
(571977) 2008 AM_{126}	6 January 2008	list

(576456) 2012 SC_{41}	1 May 2006	list
(576836) 2012 VW_{26}	25 May 2006	list
(578431) 2014 DN_{5}	19 July 2006	list^{[D]}
(578845) 2014 GM_{64}	15 January 2007	list
(580851) 2015 DG_{202}	14 September 2007	list
(580916) 2015 EU_{8}	19 January 2007	list
(582159) 2015 PQ_{81}	14 February 2007	list
(583890) 2016 PX_{135}	25 May 2006	list
(583922) 2016 QE_{19}	3 September 2005	list
(585106) 2017 UJ_{11}	1 May 2006	list
(585802) 2019 JK_{11}	16 January 2005	list^{[C]}
(586646) 2004 HE_{77}	26 April 2004	list^{[C]}
(587299) 2005 WJ_{209}	25 November 2005	list^{[C]}
(587631) 2006 KN_{128}	25 May 2006	list
(587645) 2006 OK_{32}	19 July 2006	list^{[D]}
(587792) 2006 UH_{347}	26 October 2006	list
(587793) 2006 UZ_{355}	26 October 2006	list
(587910) 2007 BS_{90}	19 January 2007	list
(587941) 2007 CO_{72}	14 February 2007	list
(588407) 2008 AJ_{120}	6 January 2008	list
(588408) 2008 AX_{120}	6 January 2008	list
(590640) 2012 KL_{27}	19 January 2007	list
(591897) 2014 HV_{15}	15 January 2007	list
(592002) 2014 KS_{73}	19 January 2007	list
(593919) 2016 CZ_{130}	15 January 2007	list

(594105) 2016 GA_{174}	19 January 2007	list
(594761) 2017 XN_{48}	19 July 2006	list^{[D]}
(595658) 2003 SL_{426}	25 September 2003	list
(596687) 2006 AZ_{103}	7 January 2006	list^{[C]}
(596765) 2006 CV_{63}	2 February 2006	list
(596920) 2006 JG_{74}	1 May 2006	list
(596949) 2006 KO_{130}	25 May 2006	list
(596951) 2006 KW_{138}	25 May 2006	list
(596975) 2006 OF_{31}	19 July 2006	list^{[D]}
(596976) 2006 OX_{37}	19 July 2006	list^{[D]}
(597197) 2006 UA_{343}	26 October 2006	list
(597198) 2006 UU_{352}	26 October 2006	list
(597199) 2006 UY_{352}	26 October 2006	list
(597306) 2007 AV_{32}	15 January 2007	list
(597318) 2007 BS_{93}	19 January 2007	list
(597341) 2007 CW_{68}	14 February 2007	list
(597614) 2007 RM_{314}	14 September 2007	list^{[A]}
(600009) 2011 ED_{48}	25 May 2006	list
(600108) 2011 JR	25 May 2006	list
(601029) 2012 UY_{54}	19 July 2006	list^{[D]}
(602660) 2014 OG_{147}	12 September 2004	list^{[F]}
(605365) 2016 GG_{178}	19 July 2006	list^{[D]}
(606335) 2017 UG_{2}	1 May 2006	list
(609034) 2004 RF_{351}	12 September 2004	list^{[F]}
(609287) 2004 XV_{188}	15 December 2004	list^{[C]}

(609745) 2005 OW_{30}	31 July 2005	list^{[C]}
(610581) 2006 CC_{64}	2 February 2006	list
(610584) 2006 CO_{74}	3 February 2006	list^{[G]}
(610886) 2006 JA_{77}	1 May 2006	list
(610927) 2006 KG_{130}	25 May 2006	list
(610928) 2006 KQ_{134}	25 May 2006	list
(610930) 2006 KA_{138}	25 May 2006	list
(610931) 2006 KS_{138}	25 May 2006	list
(610932) 2006 KZ_{142}	25 May 2006	list
(610972) 2006 OW_{23}	19 July 2006	list^{[D]}
(610975) 2006 OP_{25}	19 July 2006	list^{[D]}
(611358) 2006 UM_{355}	26 October 2006	list
(611598) 2007 BO_{84}	19 January 2007	list
(611636) 2007 CP_{74}	14 February 2007	list
(611637) 2007 CN_{77}	14 February 2007	list
(613214) 2005 UN_{524}	25 October 2005	list
613419 Lafayettequartet	1 May 2006	list
616184 Malahat	5 August 2005	list^{[C]}
(616233) 2005 QE_{186}	30 August 2005	list
617403 Boley	16 January 2005	list^{[C]}
(617917) 2006 KQ_{129}	25 May 2006	list
(617933) 2006 OQ_{37}	19 July 2006	list^{[D]}
(618080) 2006 UZ_{349}	26 October 2006	list
(618185) 2007 BU_{84}	19 January 2007	list
(618186) 2007 BM_{89}	19 January 2007	list

(618187) 2007 BU_{90}	19 January 2007	list
(618919) 2004 RU_{353}	12 September 2004	list^{[F]}
(618990) 2005 BW_{47}	16 January 2005	list^{[C]}
(619631) 2005 PC_{28}	10 August 2005	list^{[C]}
(619632) 2005 PF_{28}	10 August 2005	list^{[C]}
(619923) 2006 KS_{130}	25 May 2006	list
(620539) 2004 XJ_{189}	15 December 2004	list^{[C]}
(620754) 2006 JO_{75}	1 May 2006	list
(620768) 2006 KV_{128}	25 May 2006	list
(620769) 2006 KO_{131}	25 May 2006	list
(620770) 2006 KR_{133}	25 May 2006	list
(620988) 2007 CO_{68}	14 February 2007	list
(623746) 2018 AZ_{14}	19 July 2006	list^{[D]}
(624992) 2004 VA_{120}	9 November 2004	list^{[A]}
(625182) 2005 QB_{186}	30 August 2005	list
(625677) 2006 JN_{68}	1 May 2006	list
(625678) 2006 JW_{72}	1 May 2006	list
(625679) 2006 JE_{78}	1 May 2006	list
(625700) 2006 KP_{131}	25 May 2006	list
(626028) 2006 UY_{340}	26 October 2006	list
(626030) 2006 UN_{350}	26 October 2006	list
(626238) 2007 BD_{89}	19 January 2007	list
(626268) 2007 CF_{75}	14 February 2007	list
(626901) 2008 AX_{131}	6 January 2008	list^{[E]}
(627838) 2011 SH_{50}	1 May 2006	list

(628266) 2014 RR_{8}	19 January 2007	list
(629985) 2004 PD_{117}	12 August 2004	list
(630095) 2004 XO_{190}	15 December 2004	list^{[C]}
(630725) 2006 KV_{136}	25 May 2006	list
(630755) 2006 OX_{26}	19 July 2006	list^{[D]}
(630971) 2006 SE_{417}	18 September 2006	list
(631108) 2006 UG_{352}	26 October 2006	list
(631330) 2007 BH_{86}	19 January 2007	list
(631331) 2007 BB_{96}	19 January 2007	list
(632099) 2008 AW_{118}	6 January 2008	list
(632100) 2008 AN_{119}	6 January 2008	list
(632763) 2008 VB_{38}	16 January 2005	list^{[C]}
(632769) 2008 VF_{60}	16 January 2005	list^{[C]}
(634850) 2012 SK_{20}	25 May 2006	list
(635120) 2012 XP_{156}	25 May 2006	list
(637038) 2015 BO_{244}	25 May 2006	list
(637205) 2015 DK_{75}	16 January 2005	list^{[C]}
(638943) 2016 GC_{251}	25 May 2006	list
(639036) 2016 NB_{143}	12 August 2004	list
(639114) 2016 RD_{16}	25 May 2006	list
(639265) 2017 BH_{20}	25 May 2006	list
(641359) 2003 SR_{424}	25 September 2003	list
(641727) 2004 PZ_{115}	12 August 2004	list
(642279) 2005 PP_{27}	10 August 2005	list^{[C]}
(642361) 2005 QU_{184}	30 August 2005	list

(643057) 2005 WH_{209}	25 November 2005	list^{[C]}
(643454) 2006 CT_{63}	2 February 2006	list
(643456) 2006 CT_{70}	3 February 2006	list^{[G]}
(643461) 2006 CM_{79}	3 February 2006	list^{[G]}
(643620) 2006 JQ_{73}	1 May 2006	list
(643659) 2006 KH_{132}	25 May 2006	list
(643660) 2006 KN_{135}	25 May 2006	list
(643661) 2006 KB_{137}	25 May 2006	list
(643678) 2006 OH_{32}	19 July 2006	list^{[D]}
(644347) 2006 UP_{355}	26 October 2006	list
(644957) 2007 BP_{95}	19 January 2007	list
(644958) 2007 BS_{97}	19 January 2007	list
(644959) 2007 BT_{98}	19 January 2007	list
(645014) 2007 CU_{77}	14 February 2007	list
(646188) 2008 AQ_{118}	6 January 2008	list
(646189) 2008 AV_{119}	6 January 2008	list
(646190) 2008 AR_{120}	6 January 2008	list
(648038) 2009 DZ_{78}	15 January 2007	list
(649234) 2011 BQ_{49}	25 September 2003	list
(649722) 2011 SH_{43}	15 January 2007	list
(649733) 2011 SZ_{62}	15 January 2007	list
(650879) 2012 UX_{5}	14 February 2007	list
(651487) 2013 BK_{35}	19 July 2006	list^{[D]}
(651538) 2013 CS_{39}	19 July 2006	list^{[D]}
(652917) 2014 GY_{50}	1 November 2005	list^{[C]}

(653759) 2014 TE_{5}	26 April 2004	list^{[C]}
(656605) 2016 CA_{132}	15 January 2007	list
(656986) 2016 GB_{13}	19 January 2007	list
(658434) 2017 RH_{50}	25 May 2006	list
(658880) 2017 WV_{63}	5 August 2005	list^{[C]}
(659377) 2019 AW_{57}	27 August 2008	list
(659848) 2021 FJ_{38}	3 February 2006	list^{[G]}
(659907) 2021 HE_{26}	27 May 2009	list
661786 Aikman	10 August 2005	list^{[C]}
662131 Kierancarroll	27 October 2005	list^{[C]}
(662372) 2006 AR_{102}	7 January 2006	list^{[C]}
(662441) 2006 CY_{64}	2 February 2006	list
(662443) 2006 CK_{73}	3 February 2006	list^{[G]}
(662569) 2006 JW_{71}	1 May 2006	list
(662570) 2006 JR_{76}	1 May 2006	list
(662571) 2006 JC_{77}	1 May 2006	list
(662598) 2006 KV_{126}	25 May 2006	list
(662599) 2006 KO_{129}	25 May 2006	list
(662861) 2006 UM_{2}	26 April 2004	list^{[C]}
(663163) 2007 BU_{97}	19 January 2007	list
(663164) 2007 BE_{98}	19 January 2007	list
(663207) 2007 CZ_{72}	14 February 2007	list
(664507) 2008 RS_{147}	25 May 2006	list
(666327) 2010 DC_{115}	18 February 2010	list
(666578) 2010 RZ_{106}	19 January 2007	list

(666644) 2010 SE_{27}	19 July 2006	list^{[D]}
(668641) 2012 DQ_{28}	2 February 2006	list
(669115) 2012 TT_{49}	1 May 2006	list
(671238) 2014 HM_{175}	15 January 2007	list
(673176) 2015 BT_{126}	19 July 2006	list^{[D]}
(673501) 2015 DZ_{98}	19 January 2007	list
(674303) 2015 OD_{9}	15 January 2007	list
(674453) 2015 PZ_{85}	19 January 2007	list
(674724) 2015 RP_{216}	14 February 2007	list
(675004) 2015 TW_{224}	14 February 2007	list
(675213) 2015 VU	1 November 2005	list^{[C]}
(676504) 2016 GT_{246}	19 January 2007	list
(677517) 2016 WY_{24}	19 January 2007	list
(678484) 2017 SV_{126}	16 January 2005	list
(679905) 2021 PB_{40}	19 July 2006	list^{[D]}
(681093) 2004 HA_{76}	26 April 2004	list^{[C]}
(681094) 2004 HU_{76}	26 April 2004	list^{[C]}
(681172) 2004 RN_{349}	12 September 2004	list^{[F]}
(681280) 2004 VV_{130}	9 November 2004	list^{[A]}
(681327) 2005 BP_{47}	16 January 2005	list^{[C]}
(681521) 2005 NV_{125}	7 July 2005	list^{[E]}
(681526) 2005 OB_{30}	31 July 2005	list^{[C]}
(681567) 2005 RE_{50}	3 September 2005	list
(682008) 2006 AB_{103}	7 January 2006	list^{[C]}
(682009) 2006 AR_{103}	7 January 2006	list^{[C]}

(682119) 2006 CR_{64}	2 February 2006	list
(682288) 2006 JV_{71}	1 May 2006	list
(682289) 2006 JD_{76}	1 May 2006	list
(682326) 2006 KK_{127}	25 May 2006	list
(682327) 2006 KM_{127}	25 May 2006	list
(682328) 2006 KQ_{127}	25 May 2006	list
(682329) 2006 KX_{129}	25 May 2006	list
(682330) 2006 KP_{130}	25 May 2006	list
(682332) 2006 KW_{139}	25 May 2006	list
(682367) 2006 OS_{32}	19 July 2006	list^{[D]}
(682368) 2006 OG_{36}	19 July 2006	list^{[D]}
(682588) 2006 UZ_{348}	26 October 2006	list
(682766) 2007 AM_{32}	15 January 2007	list
(682796) 2007 BD_{84}	19 January 2007	list
(682797) 2007 BG_{92}	19 January 2007	list
(682798) 2007 BU_{96}	19 January 2007	list
(682839) 2007 CG_{72}	14 February 2007	list
(683128) 2007 OR_{11}	28 July 2007	list^{[B]}
(683236) 2007 RO_{305}	14 September 2007	list
(683698) 2008 AB_{124}	6 January 2008	list
(683699) 2008 AU_{124}	6 January 2008	list
(683700) 2008 AP_{125}	6 January 2008	list
(683702) 2008 AK_{133}	6 January 2008	list^{[E]}
(688649) 2012 VV_{73}	14 September 2007	list
(688729) 2012 XO_{25}	25 May 2006	list

(690575) 2014 JZ_{7}	15 January 2007	list
(691218) 2014 OS_{323}	19 January 2007	list
(691243) 2014 OL_{351}	3 February 2006	list^{[G]}
(691777) 2014 QW_{488}	14 February 2007	list
(691962) 2014 SY_{135}	25 May 2006	list
(694196) 2015 QF_{7}	16 January 2005	list^{[C]}
(694265) 2015 RL_{71}	19 January 2007	list
(695615) 2016 AU_{27}	25 May 2006	list
(695909) 2016 CS_{39}	3 February 2006	list^{[G]}
(697957) 2017 RL_{40}	14 February 2007	list
(698246) 2017 VJ_{26}	1 May 2006	list
(699168) 2019 JF_{50}	12 September 2010	list
(699709) 2020 VT_{21}	29 August 2008	list
(699755) 2021 NQ_{16}	17 April 2009	list
(699995) 1993 HF_{2}	18 March 2010	list
(701366) 2004 RT_{348}	12 September 2004	list
(701454) 2004 VB_{113}	9 November 2004	list^{[A]}
(701455) 2004 VL_{114}	9 November 2004	list^{[A]}
(701456) 2004 VR_{117}	9 November 2004	list^{[A]}
701781 Dougjohnstone	5 August 2005	list^{[C]}
(702319) 2006 CU_{75}	3 February 2006	list^{[G]}
(702320) 2006 CM_{76}	3 February 2006	list^{[G]}
(702507) 2006 JL_{78}	1 May 2006	list
(702571) 2006 KC_{126}	25 May 2006	list
(702572) 2006 KK_{131}	25 May 2006	list

(702609) 2006 OD_{33}	19 July 2006	list^{[D]}
(702610) 2006 OV_{37}	19 July 2006	list^{[D]}
(702905) 2006 UO_{339}	26 October 2006	list
(703061) 2007 AR_{32}	15 January 2007	list
(703110) 2007 CW_{75}	14 February 2007	list
(703464) 2007 RP_{303}	14 September 2007	list
(704124) 2008 AA_{133}	6 January 2008	list^{[E]}
(708367) 2012 BQ_{94}	19 July 2006	list^{[D]}
(708636) 2012 GU_{9}	9 November 2004	list^{[A]}
(709195) 2012 VZ_{94}	3 September 2005	list
(709551) 2013 CW_{79}	19 July 2006	list^{[D]}
(709933) 2013 JQ_{26}	9 November 2004	list^{[A]}
(709935) 2013 JH_{29}	19 January 2007	list
(710142) 2013 PJ_{56}	26 October 2006	list
(711423) 2014 OC_{161}	26 October 2006	list
(712184) 2014 SF_{115}	1 May 2006	list
(712835) 2014 WE_{269}	28 July 2007	list^{[B]}
(713934) 2015 HY_{26}	9 November 2004	list^{[A]}
(716083) 2016 AP_{176}	25 May 2006	list
(716453) 2016 CZ_{152}	1 May 2006	list
(716645) 2016 EL_{20}	14 September 2007	list
(716659) 2016 EW_{57}	25 May 2006	list
(717349) 2016 SK_{44}	25 May 2006	list
(719331) 2019 FN_{24}	15 December 2009	list
(719694) 2020 KN_{24}	19 April 2009	list

(721827) 2004 HU_{77}	26 April 2004	list^{[C]}
(721896) 2004 RA_{350}	12 September 2004	list^{[F]}
(721965) 2004 VM_{113}	9 November 2004	list^{[A]}
(721996) 2004 XD_{189}	15 December 2004	list^{[C]}
(722335) 2005 PF_{25}	5 August 2005	list^{[C]}
(722356) 2005 QS_{183}	30 August 2005	list
(722357) 2005 QU_{183}	30 August 2005	list
(722358) 2005 QF_{185}	30 August 2005	list
(722589) 2005 VW_{134}	1 November 2005	list^{[C]}
(722823) 2006 CQ_{76}	3 February 2006	list^{[G]}
(723013) 2006 JP_{61}	1 May 2006	list
(723016) 2006 JH_{78}	1 May 2006	list
(723083) 2006 KN_{129}	25 May 2006	list
(723084) 2006 KR_{129}	25 May 2006	list
(723085) 2006 KZ_{129}	25 May 2006	list
(723086) 2006 KA_{133}	25 May 2006	list
(723089) 2006 KV_{142}	25 May 2006	list
(723142) 2006 ON_{33}	19 July 2006	list^{[D]}
(723143) 2006 OQ_{35}	19 July 2006	list^{[D]}
(723595) 2007 AX_{36}	15 January 2007	list
(723605) 2007 BX_{94}	19 January 2007	list
(723606) 2007 BR_{95}	19 January 2007	list
(723609) 2007 BF_{99}	19 January 2007	list
(723632) 2007 CW_{71}	14 February 2007	list
(723922) 2007 RF_{306}	14 September 2007	list

(724461) 2008 AL_{130}	6 January 2008	list^{[E]}
(730990) 2012 XK_{23}	25 May 2006	list
(732672) 2014 JR_{18}	25 May 2006	list
732821 Raycarlberg	25 November 2005	list^{[C]}
(732937) 2014 OU_{47}	19 January 2007	list
(733063) 2014 OC_{326}	14 February 2007	list
(733759) 2014 UC_{108}	14 February 2007	list
(733891) 2014 WD_{19}	28 July 2007	list^{[B]}
(734521) 2015 AW_{275}	14 September 2007	list
(734848) 2015 BZ_{533}	25 May 2006	list
(735569) 2015 HN_{168}	15 January 2007	list
(735680) 2015 KX_{125}	25 May 2006	list
(735811) 2015 MA_{93}	15 January 2007	list
(736537) 2015 TT_{287}	15 January 2007	list
(736611) 2015 UR_{9}	15 January 2007	list
(737343) 2016 BU_{73}	25 May 2006	list
(737791) 2016 EL_{97}	25 May 2006	list
(737941) 2016 FY_{4}	25 May 2006	list
(738802) 2017 BY_{86}	15 January 2007	list
(739072) 2017 FA_{32}	6 January 2008	list^{[E]}
741306 Marshallmccall	27 October 2005	list^{[C]}
(741443) 2006 AQ_{102}	7 January 2006	list^{[C]}
741444 Abbasi	7 January 2006	list^{[C]}
(741572) 2006 JA_{70}	1 May 2006	list
(741573) 2006 JF_{74}	1 May 2006	list

(741574) 2006 JX_{74}	1 May 2006	list
(741601) 2006 KN_{142}	25 May 2006	list
(741632) 2006 OO_{32}	19 July 2006	list^{[D]}
(742076) 2007 AL_{33}	15 January 2007	list
(742092) 2007 BE_{88}	19 January 2007	list
(742093) 2007 BK_{91}	19 January 2007	list
(742094) 2007 BE_{93}	19 January 2007	list
(742896) 2008 AM_{120}	6 January 2008	list
(745100) 2010 RW_{180}	1 May 2006	list
(747523) 2012 VV_{102}	25 May 2006	list
(749114) 2014 ET_{199}	25 May 2006	list
(749319) 2014 HL_{122}	1 May 2006	list
(749327) 2014 HF_{133}	12 August 2004	list
(749365) 2014 HY_{185}	25 May 2006	list
(750461) 2014 UU_{186}	3 February 2006	list^{[G]}
(751792) 2015 GW_{43}	2 February 2006	list
(754879) 2016 UF_{111}	15 January 2007	list
(756082) 2018 FL_{21}	1 May 2006	list
(756409) 2019 HZ_{1}	19 July 2006	list^{[D]}
(756556) 2019 RY_{9}	29 September 2008	list
(757719) 2004 XJ_{190}	15 December 2004	list^{[C]}
(757876) 2005 OD_{30}	31 July 2005	list^{[C]}
(758253) 2006 JM_{71}	1 May 2006	list
(758254) 2006 JC_{78}	1 May 2006	list
(758255) 2006 JR_{78}	1 May 2006	list

(758275) 2006 KL_{129}	25 May 2006	list
(758276) 2006 KR_{130}	25 May 2006	list
(758278) 2006 KD_{135}	25 May 2006	list
(758297) 2006 OC_{24}	19 July 2006	list^{[D]}
(758301) 2006 OH_{34}	19 July 2006	list^{[D]}
(758303) 2006 OH_{37}	19 July 2006	list^{[D]}
(758770) 2007 BE_{97}	19 January 2007	list
(758771) 2007 BZ_{98}	19 January 2007	list
(758772) 2007 BA_{99}	19 January 2007	list
(758804) 2007 CC_{72}	14 February 2007	list
(758979) 2007 RZ_{12}	25 May 2006	list
(759046) 2007 RL_{306}	14 September 2007	list
(759738) 2008 AR_{130}	6 January 2008	list^{[E]}
(759739) 2008 AM_{132}	6 January 2008	list^{[E]}
(762150) 2010 WO_{44}	14 February 2007	list
(762502) 2011 EK_{96}	25 September 2003	list
(762890) 2011 SQ_{1}	15 January 2007	list
(763944) 2012 SG_{105}	16 September 2012	list
(764673) 2013 GK_{21}	15 January 2007	list
(764785) 2013 JM_{52}	26 October 2006	list
(764876) 2013 NO_{40}	28 July 2007	list^{[B]}
(766657) 2014 OG_{311}	6 January 2008	list
(767196) 2014 SU_{197}	14 February 2007	list
(768708) 2015 EQ_{70}	31 July 2005	list^{[C]}
(769476) 2015 PL_{105}	15 January 2007	list

(772590) 2017 RZ_{100}	26 October 2006	list
(773626) 2020 CW_{7}	24 February 2009	list
(774472) 2004 HL_{77}	26 April 2004	list^{[C]}
(774531) 2004 RL_{355}	12 September 2004	list^{[F]}
(774570) 2004 VN_{115}	9 November 2004	list^{[A]}
(774721) 2005 PT_{27}	10 August 2005	list^{[C]}
(774732) 2005 QJ_{185}	30 August 2005	list
(774752) 2005 RR_{48}	3 September 2005	list
(774977) 2005 WQ_{209}	25 November 2005	list^{[C]}
(775173) 2006 JX_{71}	1 May 2006	list
(775174) 2006 JZ_{71}	1 May 2006	list
(775175) 2006 JK_{72}	1 May 2006	list
(775176) 2006 JN_{73}	1 May 2006	list
(775178) 2006 JY_{76}	1 May 2006	list
(775179) 2006 JB_{77}	1 May 2006	list
(775181) 2006 JT_{77}	1 May 2006	list
(775182) 2006 JW_{78}	1 May 2006	list
(775205) 2006 KR_{132}	25 May 2006	list
(775206) 2006 KU_{136}	25 May 2006	list
(775207) 2006 KN_{139}	25 May 2006	list
(775208) 2006 KF_{142}	25 May 2006	list
(775226) 2006 OQ_{25}	19 July 2006	list^{[D]}
(775228) 2006 OR_{29}	19 July 2006	list^{[D]}
(775230) 2006 OC_{34}	19 July 2006	list^{[D]}
(775231) 2006 OX_{34}	19 July 2006	list^{[D]}

(775232) 2006 OO_{36}	19 July 2006	list^{[D]}
(775387) 2006 SU_{421}	18 September 2006	list
(775553) 2006 UF_{342}	26 October 2006	list
(775555) 2006 UV_{347}	26 October 2006	list
(775556) 2006 UV_{352}	26 October 2006	list
(775557) 2006 UH_{353}	26 October 2006	list
(775741) 2007 AV_{36}	15 January 2007	list
(775750) 2007 BL_{82}	19 January 2007	list
(775751) 2007 BO_{82}	19 January 2007	list
(775753) 2007 BA_{84}	19 January 2007	list
(775754) 2007 BM_{84}	19 January 2007	list
(775755) 2007 BP_{84}	19 January 2007	list
(775757) 2007 BR_{91}	19 January 2007	list
(775758) 2007 BF_{95}	19 January 2007	list
(775759) 2007 BE_{99}	19 January 2007	list
(775779) 2007 CY_{72}	14 February 2007	list
(775781) 2007 CM_{77}	14 February 2007	list
(775975) 2007 RX_{304}	14 September 2007	list
(776555) 2008 AV_{118}	6 January 2008	list
(776556) 2008 AQ_{120}	6 January 2008	list
(776557) 2008 AX_{122}	6 January 2008	list
(777127) 2008 SE_{365}	29 September 2008	list
(777336) 2008 WA_{56}	1 May 2006	list
(777667) 2009 DX_{160}	23 February 2009	list
(777736) 2009 FM_{95}	23 March 2009	list

(777805) 2009 JT_{23}	14 May 2009	list
(780918) 2013 AO_{130}	25 May 2006	list
(783283) 2014 QZ_{281}	19 January 2007	list
(785201) 2015 JD_{14}	15 January 2007	list
(785221) 2015 KP_{24}	15 January 2007	list
(786385) 2015 XW_{414}	15 January 2007	list
(786533) 2016 AM_{46}	6 January 2008	list^{[E]}
(786986) 2016 CA_{38}	14 February 2007	list
(787057) 2016 CV_{159}	19 January 2007	list
(787183) 2016 CL_{313}	9 November 2004	list^{[A]}
(790794) 2018 YR_{8}	17 April 2009	list
(791447) 2019 UG_{117}	27 March 2009	list
(791947) 2020 OP_{35}	10 January 2008	list
(793566) 2004 HT_{76}	26 April 2004	list^{[C]}
(793568) 2004 HF_{77}	26 April 2004	list^{[C]}
(793791) 2005 OT_{30}	31 July 2005	list^{[C]}
(793797) 2005 PL_{26}	5 August 2005	list^{[C]}
(794078) 2005 VQ_{134}	1 November 2005	list^{[C]}
(794110) 2005 WX_{209}	25 November 2005	list^{[C]}
(794221) 2006 CQ_{74}	3 February 2006	list^{[G]}
(794222) 2006 CQ_{75}	3 February 2006	list^{[G]}
(794287) 2006 JV_{61}	1 May 2006	list
(794291) 2006 JG_{69}	1 May 2006	list
(794305) 2006 KG_{126}	25 May 2006	list
(794306) 2006 KX_{130}	25 May 2006	list

(794307) 2006 KA_{137}	25 May 2006	list
(794308) 2006 KR_{137}	25 May 2006	list
(794309) 2006 KM_{138}	25 May 2006	list
(794311) 2006 KQ_{140}	25 May 2006	list
(794319) 2006 OH_{25}	19 July 2006	list^{[D]}
(794320) 2006 OP_{30}	19 July 2006	list^{[D]}
(794321) 2006 OR_{32}	19 July 2006	list^{[D]}
(794425) 2006 SK_{419}	18 September 2006	list
(794537) 2006 UC_{339}	26 October 2006	list
(794538) 2006 UG_{342}	26 October 2006	list
(794539) 2006 UQ_{344}	26 October 2006	list
(794540) 2006 US_{349}	26 October 2006	list
(794672) 2007 AO_{34}	15 January 2007	list
(794674) 2007 AF_{36}	15 January 2007	list
(794685) 2007 BD_{94}	19 January 2007	list
(794706) 2007 CA_{76}	14 February 2007	list
(795194) 2008 AH_{123}	6 January 2008	list
(795195) 2008 AF_{124}	6 January 2008	list
(795196) 2008 AM_{125}	6 January 2008	list
(795977) 2008 WC_{168}	25 November 2008	list
(796189) 2009 HT_{129}	17 April 2009	list
(798898) 2013 AW_{94}	15 January 2007	list
(800412) 2014 FK_{2}	6 January 2008	list
(802193) 2015 BJ_{192}	9 November 2004	list^{[A]}
(805039) 2016 CG_{218}	25 May 2006	list

(805403) 2016 EP_{217}	19 January 2007	list
(809713) 2019 UX_{37}	11 February 2008	list
(810627) 2021 FU_{9}	17 March 2012	list
(810743) 2021 GL_{69}	17 August 2009	list
(811115) 2021 RZ_{184}	3 December 2010	list
(812960) 2006 CG_{64}	2 February 2006	list
(813072) 2006 JK_{69}	1 May 2006	list
(813073) 2006 JU_{74}	1 May 2006	list
(813074) 2006 JC_{75}	1 May 2006	list
(813099) 2006 KK_{141}	25 May 2006	list
(813309) 2006 UG_{347}	27 October 2006	list
(813426) 2007 AA_{33}	15 January 2007	list
(813428) 2007 AR_{33}	15 January 2007	list
(813442) 2007 BT_{86}	19 January 2007	list
(813443) 2007 BM_{88}	19 January 2007	list
(813444) 2007 BU_{89}	19 January 2007	list
(813460) 2007 CY_{66}	14 February 2007	list
(813461) 2007 CD_{67}	14 February 2007	list
(813462) 2007 CY_{67}	14 February 2007	list
(813713) 2007 RD_{304}	14 September 2007	list
(814811) 2008 YP_{52}	1 May 2006	list
(815483) 2009 XJ_{30}	14 December 2009	list
(815484) 2009 XU_{31}	14 December 2009	list
(817844) 2012 VM_{58}	7 January 2006	list^{[C]}
(819930) 2014 OB_{177}	1 May 2006	list

(820111) 2014 QE_{120}	25 September 2003	list
(820195) 2014 QA_{349}	3 February 2006	list^{[G]}
(820227) 2014 QU_{417}	6 January 2008	list
(821593) 2015 HM_{133}	26 October 2006	list
(821756) 2015 KK_{145}	15 January 2007	list
(821814) 2015 LW_{5}	15 January 2007	list
(822693) 2015 UH_{21}	3 February 2006	list^{[G]}
(824971) 2017 QE_{27}	3 September 2005	list
(826395) 2020 KB_{22}	15 January 2007	list
(828425) 2004 HY_{76}	26 April 2004	list^{[C]}
(828510) 2004 RA_{349}	12 September 2004	list^{[F]}
(828609) 2004 VX_{127}	9 November 2004	list^{[A]}
(828629) 2004 XA_{187}	11 December 2004	list^{[C]}
(828630) 2004 XS_{187}	11 December 2004	list^{[C]}
(828631) 2004 XT_{187}	11 December 2004	list^{[C]}
(828632) 2004 XC_{188}	15 December 2004	list^{[C]}
(828634) 2004 XJ_{188}	15 December 2004	list^{[C]}
(828662) 2005 BC_{47}	16 January 2005	list^{[C]}
(828663) 2005 BD_{47}	16 January 2005	list^{[C]}
(828796) 2005 PH_{26}	5 August 2005	list^{[C]}
(828813) 2005 QV_{184}	30 August 2005	list
(828814) 2005 QC_{185}	30 August 2005	list
(828816) 2005 QV_{185}	2 September 2005	list
(828998) 2005 UZ_{524}	25 October 2005	list^{[C]}
(829225) 2006 CQ_{64}	2 February 2006	list

(829226) 2006 CC_{73}	3 February 2006	list^{[G]}
(829228) 2006 CU_{79}	3 February 2006	list^{[G]}
(829348) 2006 KQ_{125}	25 May 2006	list
(829349) 2006 KY_{134}	25 May 2006	list
(829350) 2006 KQ_{135}	25 May 2006	list
(829351) 2006 KU_{135}	25 May 2006	list
(829368) 2006 OP_{23}	19 July 2006	list^{[D]}
(829369) 2006 OV_{26}	19 July 2006	list^{[D]}
(829370) 2006 OM_{37}	19 July 2006	list^{[D]}
(829523) 2006 TO_{130}	13 October 2006	list^{[E]}
(829680) 2007 BS_{84}	19 January 2007	list
(829707) 2007 CG_{73}	14 February 2007	list
(829953) 2007 RK_{306}	14 September 2007	list
(830324) 2008 AY_{130}	6 January 2008	list^{[E]}
(833887) 2010 LL_{126}	14 February 2007	list
(834871) 2010 VQ_{134}	30 August 2005	list
(835367) 2011 HM_{58}	25 September 2003	list
(836964) 2012 XH_{10}	25 May 2006	list
(837163) 2013 CJ_{161}	12 September 2004	list^{[F]}
(838051) 2013 YG_{109}	25 May 2006	list
(838698) 2014 MS_{23}	11 December 2004	list^{[C]}
(839116) 2014 PV_{15}	16 January 2005	list^{[C]}
(841965) 2015 RA_{256}	25 May 2006	list
(843135) 2016 CE_{157}	19 January 2007	list
(843498) 2016 GO_{166}	19 January 2007	list

(843827) 2016 PG_{84}	25 May 2006	list
(844063) 2016 RT_{45}	25 May 2006	list
(846567) 2019 WN_{15}	27 February 2009	list
(848537) 2004 PF_{117}	12 August 2004	list
(848611) 2004 RU_{347}	12 September 2004	list^{[F]}
(848791) 2004 XF_{189}	15 December 2004	list^{[C]}
(849045) 2005 QH_{186}	2 September 2005	list
(849046) 2005 QN_{186}	2 September 2005	list
(849552) 2006 AD_{103}	7 January 2006	list^{[C]}
(849649) 2006 CH_{70}	3 February 2006	list^{[G]}
(849650) 2006 CS_{70}	3 February 2006	list^{[G]}
(849651) 2006 CY_{70}	3 February 2006	list^{[G]}
(849652) 2006 CV_{77}	3 February 2006	list^{[G]}
(849781) 2006 JJ_{72}	1 May 2006	list
(849782) 2006 JP_{72}	1 May 2006	list
(849783) 2006 JY_{74}	1 May 2006	list
(849784) 2006 JA_{76}	1 May 2006	list
(849785) 2006 JO_{77}	1 May 2006	list
(849816) 2006 KW_{127}	25 May 2006	list
(849817) 2006 KU_{128}	25 May 2006	list
(849818) 2006 KP_{129}	25 May 2006	list
(849819) 2006 KT_{130}	25 May 2006	list
(849820) 2006 KZ_{130}	25 May 2006	list
(849821) 2006 KB_{131}	25 May 2006	list
(849822) 2006 KY_{131}	25 May 2006	list

(849838) 2006 OB_{25}	19 July 2006	list^{[D]}
(849839) 2006 OR_{25}	19 July 2006	list^{[D]}
(849840) 2006 OE_{27}	19 July 2006	list^{[D]}
(849841) 2006 OU_{29}	19 July 2006	list^{[D]}
(849842) 2006 OW_{33}	19 July 2006	list^{[D]}
(850062) 2006 SL_{421}	18 September 2006	list
(850255) 2006 UN_{345}	26 October 2006	list
(850257) 2006 UN_{352}	26 October 2006	list
(850438) 2007 AP_{34}	15 January 2007	list
(850439) 2007 AL_{36}	15 January 2007	list
(850445) 2007 AK_{40}	15 January 2007	list
(850459) 2007 BU_{83}	19 January 2007	list
(850460) 2007 BK_{87}	19 January 2007	list
(850461) 2007 BC_{88}	19 January 2007	list
(850500) 2007 CP_{72}	14 February 2007	list
(850501) 2007 CB_{73}	14 February 2007	list
(851597) 2008 AU_{119}	6 January 2008	list
(851598) 2008 AA_{124}	6 January 2008	list
(851599) 2008 AZ_{130}	6 January 2008	list^{[E]}
(851600) 2008 AE_{131}	6 January 2008	list^{[E]}
(855375) 2011 BC_{196}	28 January 2011	list
(856763) 2011 VT_{11}	25 May 2006	list
(858396) 2012 WE_{10}	7 January 2006	list^{[C]}
(858596) 2013 AK_{5}	14 September 2007	list
(860598) 2014 DM_{121}	15 January 2007	list

(861594) 2014 OU_{35}	19 January 2007	list
(862141) 2014 QC_{26}	3 February 2006	list^{[G]}
(862992) 2014 SF_{97}	25 September 2003	list
(867319) 2015 XC_{42}	3 February 2006	list^{[G]}
(868529) 2016 ED_{93}	1 May 2006	list
(869111) 2016 NL_{64}	6 January 2008	list^{[E]}
(874066) 2020 KU_{4}	15 January 2007	list
(874090) 2020 KB_{40}	13 July 2010	list
(874155) 2020 OU_{30}	18 April 2010	list
(874717) 2021 LQ_{27}	26 February 2009	list
Co-discovery made with:^{A} A. Papadimos,^{B} N. I. Hasan,^{C} D. D. Balam,^{D} D. Subasinghe,^{E} A. M. Gilbert,^{F} S. Popa,^{G} R. Rassmusen
