= South (lunar crater) =

Crater on the Moon

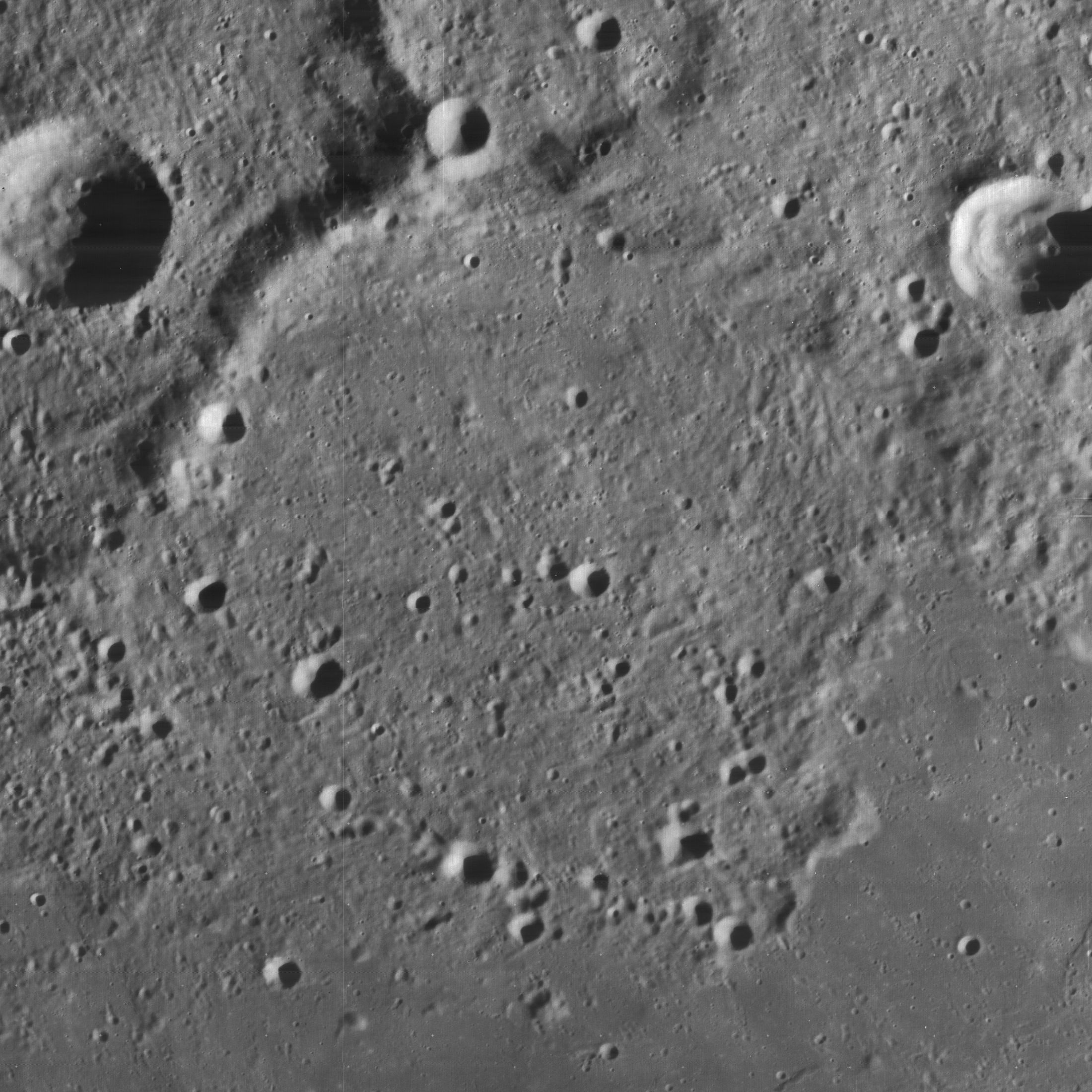
- Lunar Orbiter 4 image
- Coordinates: 58.0°N 50.8°W
- Diameter: 104 km
- Depth: Unknown
- Colongitude: 54° at sunrise
- Eponym: James South

South is a large lunar impact crater that is located in the northwest part of the Moon. Most of the southern wall of this crater is joined to the Sinus Roris bay of the Oceanus Procellarum, with the southeast rim facing Mare Frigoris. Attached to the northwest of the formation is the larger walled plain named Babbage. Just to the northeast is the crater Robinson, and farther to the northeast is another walled plain, J. Herschel.

Little remains of South's original rim, which is now just a disintegrated ring of low ridges. The most prominent surviving section lies to the northwest, while the southern half of the rim barely exists as low rises in the surface.

The interior floor of South has been resurfaced by basaltic lava, and is relatively level with no prominent features. The floor is pock-marked by many tiny craterlets, especially in the southern half. Several small craterlets lie along the remnant of the southern and southwestern rim.

== Satellite craters ==
By convention these features are identified on lunar maps by placing the letter on the side of the crater midpoint that is closest to South.

South	Latitude	Longitude	Diameter
A	57.1° N	49.9° W	6 km
B	57.5° N	44.9° W	14 km
C	55.8° N	49.4° W	7 km
D	55.2° N	48.8° W	5 km
E	56.7° N	52.8° W	8 km
F	57.2° N	53.9° W	7 km
G	55.1° N	53.3° W	6 km
H	57.2° N	47.8° W	4 km
K	59.1° N	49.9° W	3 km
M	55.4° N	51.0° W	6 km
