= 2012 XE133 =

Asteroid

2012 XE_{133}
Discovery
- Discovered by: Catalina Sky Survey
- Discovery date: 12 December 2012

Designations
- Minor planet category: Aten asteroid; Mercury grazer; Venus crosser; Earth crosser

Orbital characteristics
- Epoch 21 November 2025 (JD 2461000.5) Epoch (2025-Nov-21.0)
- Uncertainty parameter 0
- Observation arc: 8.07 yr (2946 days)
- Aphelion: 1.0360 AU (154.98 Gm)
- Perihelion: 0.41032 AU (61.383 Gm)
- Semi-major axis: 0.72316 AU (108.183 Gm)
- Eccentricity: 0.43261
- Orbital period (sidereal): 0.61 yr (224.5 d)
- Mean anomaly: 194.21°
- Mean motion: 1.6027°/day
- Inclination: 6.7277°
- Longitude of ascending node: 281.007°
- Argument of perihelion: 337.108°
- Earth MOID: 0.00250483 AU (374,717 km)

Physical characteristics
- Dimensions: 72 m^{[a]}
- Absolute magnitude (H): 23.4

2012 XE_{133} is an asteroid, classified as a near-Earth object of the Aten group that is a temporary co-orbital of Venus.

== Discovery, orbit and physical properties ==
2012 XE_{133} was first observed on 12 December 2012 by J. A. Johnson working for the Catalina Sky Survey. As of January 2026, it has been observed 180 times with a data-arc span of about 8 years. It is an Aten asteroid and its semi-major axis of 0.72 AU is very similar to that of Venus but its eccentricity is rather large (0.4332) and its inclination of 6.7° is also significant. With an absolute magnitude of 23.4, it has a diameter of approximately 62 to 138 meters. On 26 November 2020, 2012 XE_{133} was recovered and now has a well established orbit with an uncertainty parameter of 0. The asteroid often makes close approaches to Earth within 0.05 AU, and the next close approach will occur on 30 December 2028, approaching Earth at 0.0099 AU (and the Moon at 0.0080 AU).

== Quasi-satellite dynamical state and orbital evolution ==
2012 XE_{133} has been identified as a Venus co-orbital following a transitional path between Venus's Lagrangian points L_{5} point and L_{3} point. Besides being a Venus co-orbital, this asteroid is also a Mercury grazer and an Earth crosser. 2012 XE_{133} exhibits resonant (or near-resonant) behavior with Mercury, Venus and the Earth. Its short-term dynamical evolution is similar to that of two other Venus co-orbitals, 2001 CK32 and Zoozve.

== See also ==
- (322756) 2001 CK32
- 524522 Zoozve
- 2013 ND15

== Notes ==
- This is assuming an albedo of 0.25–0.05.
