= Christian Horrebow =

Danish astronomer

Christian Pedersen Horrebow (15 April 1718 – 15 September 1776) was a Danish astronomer of the 18th century. He was a son of Peder Horrebow, whom he succeeded as director of the observatory associated with the University of Copenhagen. He was himself succeeded by Thomas Bugge.

Neith, a supposed moon of Venus, was spotted by Christian Horrebow, while he was studying this planet from 1766 to 1768. He also discovered the periodicity of sunspots.

== Sources ==
- Astronomy in Denmark
