= Kimmo Innanen =

Canadian astrophysicist (1937–2011)

- Born: Kimmo Albin Innanen; March 12, 1937; Kirkland Lake, Ontario, Canada
- Died: August 3, 2011 (aged 74); Toronto, Ontario, Canada
- Children: 3

Academic background
- Education: University of Toronto (BS, PhD); University of Waterloo (MS)

Academic work
- Discipline: Astrophysics
- Institutions: York University

Kimmo Albin Innanen (March 12, 1937 – August 3, 2011) was a Canadian astrophysicist of Finnish descent.

== Early life and education ==
Innanen grew up in Toronto, although his first language was Finnish. He obtained a bachelor's degree in engineering physics with honors from the University of Toronto. In 1960, he received his master's degree in applied mathematics at the University of Waterloo. He completed his doctorate at the University of Toronto in 1964.

== Career ==
In 1966, he joined the Department of Physics (later Physics and Astronomy) at York University. His research in celestial mechanics, galactic dynamics, and later in Solar System applications and asteroids, led to the publication of more than 100 papers. In 1990, with Seppo Mikkola, he predicted the existence of Mars Trojans, confirmed by subsequent discovery and, in 1997, he was involved in the discovery of the Earth's first co-orbital companion asteroid, 3753 Cruithne. He served as the dean of science from 1986 to 1994.

He received an honorary degree from the University of Turku in 1995. The asteroid 3497 Innanen was named in his honor in 1992.

== See also ==
- List of University of Waterloo people
