= Babbage (crater) =

Lunar impact crater

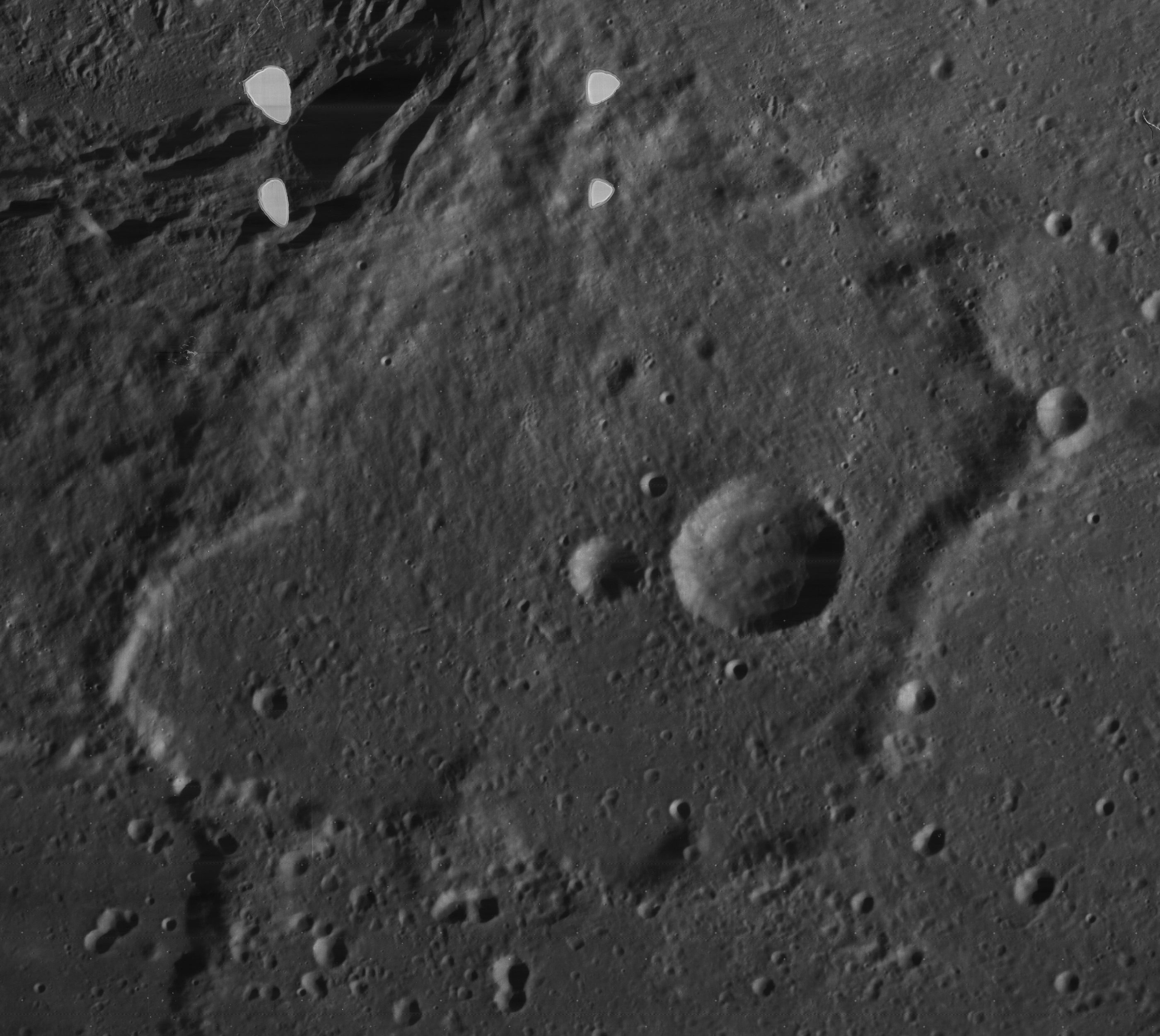
- Lunar Orbiter 4 image
- Coordinates: 59.7°N 57.1°W
- Diameter: 146.56 km (91.07 mi)
- Depth: 2.0 km
- Colongitude: 61° at sunrise
- Eponym: Charles Babbage

Babbage is an ancient and eroded lunar formation that is located near the northwest limb of the Moon. This isn't an impact crater, but rather "formed by fusion of two large rings". It is attached to the southeastern rim of the prominent crater Pythagoras. The crater remnant named South intrudes into the southeastern floor of Babbage.

This crater is named after British mathematician Charles Babbage (1792-1871), considered by some to be the "father of the computer". The name Babbage was introduced into lunar nomenclature during the 19th century by William R. Birt and John Lee. Its designation was formally adopted by the International Astronomical Union in 1935.

Patrick Moore noted that the wall of Babbage is so broken and discontinuous that it is often difficult to recognize. The outer rim of Babbage has been eroded and modified by a multitude of subsequent impacts, until all that remains is a ring of rounded hills. The most notable of these modifications is the satellite crater Babbage D, which overlays the southwestern rim. The northeast rim of this satellite crater is broken and disorganized, forming a bay on the perimeter of Babbage. Oenopides is another worn formation attached to the southwest edge of this protuberance.

The outer rampart of Pythagoras lies across the floor of Babbage, forming a region of rough terrain in the northwest part of the interior. The remainder of the crater floor is relatively flat, although it is marked by many tiny craterlets. The most notable feature on the floor is the satellite crater Babbage A, which lies in the southeast part of the interior. This feature has not been significantly worn, and appears much younger than the remainder of the formation. Just to the west of Babbage A is the smaller Babbage C, a bowl-shaped formation.

== Satellite craters ==
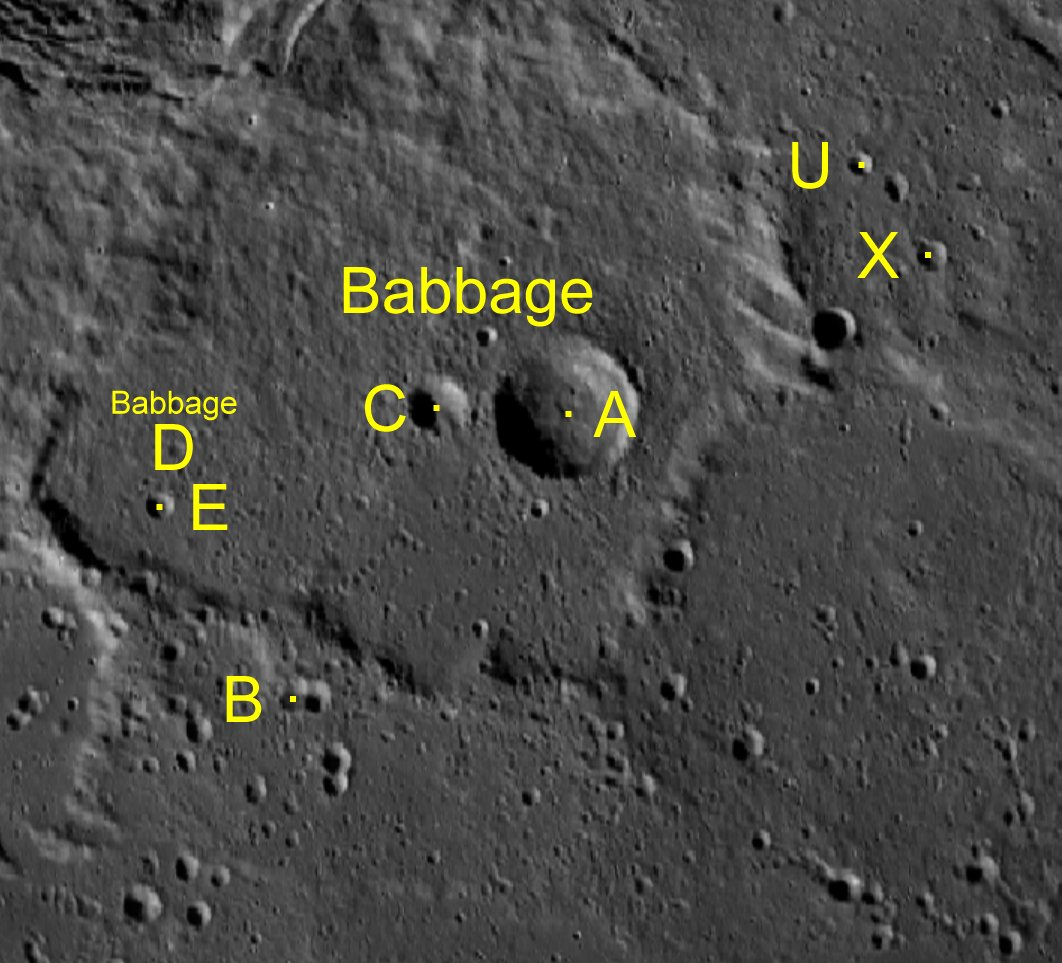
Babbage and its satellite craters

By convention these features are identified on lunar maps by placing the letter on the side of the crater midpoint that is closest to Babbage.

Babbage	Latitude	Longitude	Diameter
A	59.0° N	55.1° W	32 km
B	57.1° N	59.7° W	7 km
C	59.1° N	57.3° W	14 km
D	58.6° N	61.0° W	68 km
E	58.5° N	61.4° W	7 km
U	60.9° N	51.3° W	5 km
X	60.2° N	49.9° W	5 km
