= Robinson (crater) =

Crater on the Moon

- Coordinates: 59.0°N 45.9°W
- Diameter: 24 km
- Depth: 1.4 km
- Colongitude: 46° at sunrise
- Eponym: John T. R. Robinson

Robinson is a small lunar impact crater that lies to the southwest of the large walled plain named J. Herschel. It is located in the continental terrain to the north of the Mare Frigoris, in the northwestern part of the Moon's near side. To the southwest is another walled plain, South.

This crater has only been slightly worn through impact erosion, and it retains a sharp outer rim and well-defined features. The loose material along the inner walls has slumped and accumulated at the bottom about the interior floor, particularly along the western half. The rim is roughly circular in shape, but has minor irregularities in the form of slight outward bulges in the perimeter.
