= Thomas Bugge =

Danish astronomer (1740–1815)

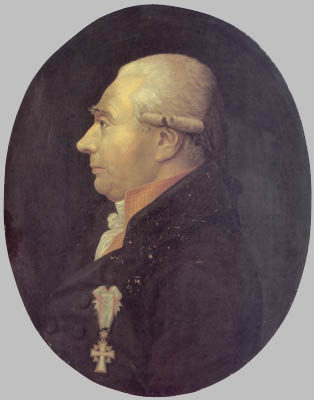
- Born: Thomas Bugge; 12 October 1740; Copenhagen, Denmark–Norway
- Died: 15 January 1815 (aged 74); Copenhagen, Denmark–Norway
- Education: University of Copenhagen
- Scientific career
- Fields: Astronomy, surveyor

Thomas Bugge (12 October 1740 – 15 January 1815) was a Danish astronomer, mathematician and surveyor. He succeeded Christian Horrebow as professor of astronomy at the University of Copenhagen in 1777. His triangulation surveys of Denmark carried out under the auspices of the Royal Danish Academy of Sciences were instrumental in creating the first precise maps of Denmark. He served as president of the Royal Danish Society for Agriculture (1773–1783), director of the General Widows' Pension Fund (1782–), secretary of the Royal Danish Academy of Sciences (1801–1815) and three one-year terms as rector of the University of Copenhagen.

== Early life and education ==
Bugge was born on 12 October 1740 in Copenhagen, the son of royal kælderskriver and later proviantforvalter Peder Bugge (1700–1773) and Oliva Saur (c. 1720 – 1785). He was taught privately by Hans Christian Saxtorph before studying theology at the University of Copenhagen, graduating in 1759.

== Career ==
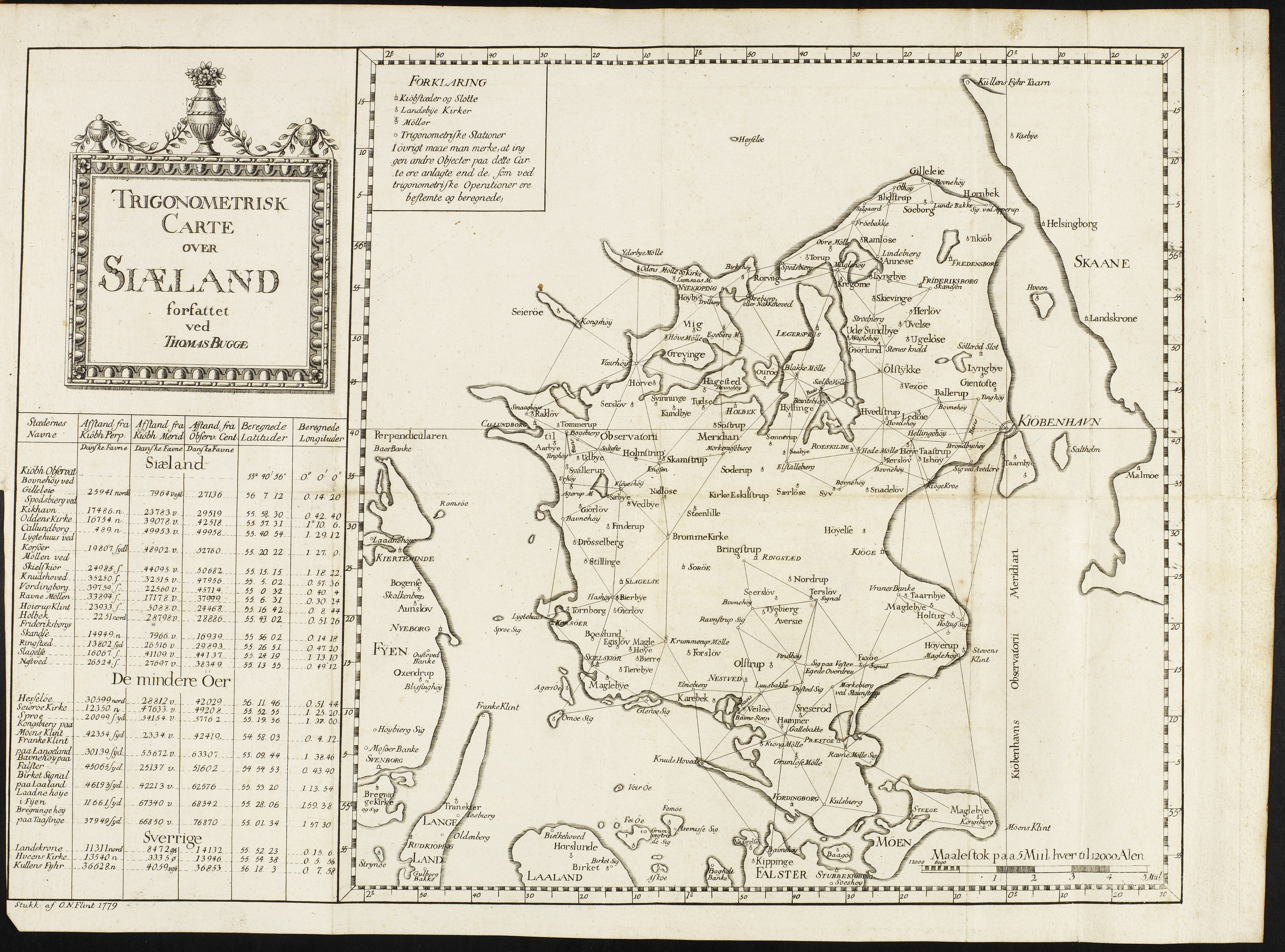
Trigonometrical map of Zealand by Bugge, 1779.

Bugge had at the same time under Christen Hees' (1712–1782) instruction studied mathematics, a subject he had shown a remarkable talent for. He worked as an assistant to Peder Kofoed (1728–1760) in connection with Kofoed's survey of Roskilde County under the auspices of the Royal Danish Academy of Science. He continued his studies of mathematics and physics and began working as an assistant for Christian Horrebow (1718–1776) at the Rundetårn Observatory. In 1761, he was sent to Trondheim to observe the Transit of Venus. The results were published in the French scientific journal Mémoires (1871). Following Kofoed's death, Bugge was hired as geographical surveyor by the Royal Danish Academy of Science. He surveyed approximately 20 km^{2} (7.7 sq mi) of Zealand annually and taught surveying at the same time. In 1765, he was appointed as trigonometrical observer and head of the Office of Surveying, where in that capacity, he carried out a triangulation of most of Zealand and Øresund and determined the polar height of a number of trig points.

As a practicing surveyor, he was responsible for the surveying of a number of estates and villages on Zealand. In 1768, Bugge was appointed Chief Surveyor. He was himself responsible for the education of surveyors and created guidelines for their work. Bugge became a member of the Royal Danish Academy of Science in 1775, further increasing his influence on its work with surveying of the country, and from 1780 until his death headed it alone. Bugge's work marked a breakthrough for the economic and geographic surveying of Denmark.

Bugge was also charged with a wide range of other assignments. In 1774, he and professor C. C. Lous created tables for the General Widows' Pension Fund (Den Almindelige Enkekasse) based on Leonhard Euler's formulas. In 1765–1772, he served as Prince Frederick's tutor in mathematics. In 1777, he succeeded Christian Horrebow as professor of astronomy. He soon thereafter went on a study trip to Germany, the Netherlands, France and England. An extract of his travelogue was published in a university programme from 1779. On his return to Denmark, the Rundetårn Observatory was refurbished and equipped with new and improved instruments. The King contributed to the project with 7,000 rigsdaler. A description of the observatory and observations from the three first years can be found in Bugge's privately published Observationes astron. annis 1781–83 (1784). On Bugge's initiative, a series of small observatories were also established in Norway, Iceland, Greenland and Tranquebar with Abraham Pihl, Erasmus Lievog, Andreas Ginge and Engelhart as the first observers.

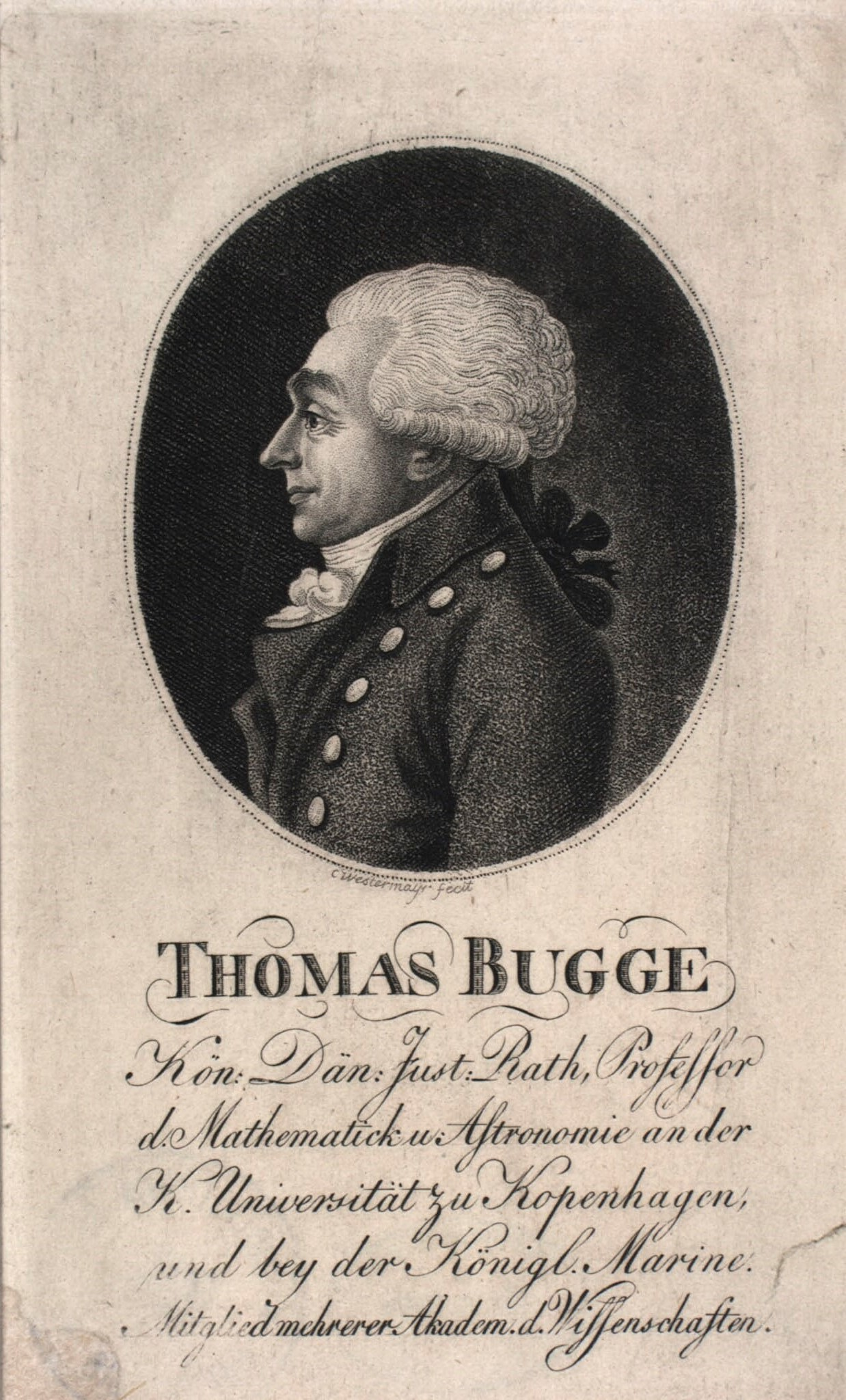
Thomas Bugge, 1890.

Bugge's scientific results were to a significant extent diminished by the many other tasks he was given. In 1782 he was appointed as director of the General Widows' Pension Fund. He was also used as a teacher of mathematics at the Naval Cadet Academy and lectured both on mathematics and water infrastructure. In 1798, he was sent by the government to Paris to represent Denmark at the congress on the metric system. The negotiations lasted so long that he had to return to Denmark before they were concluded. From 1801 until his death, he also served as secretary of the Royal Danish Academy of Sciences. He was a member of number of commissions, including those related to the cobbling of streets in Copenhagen and a regulation of Copenhagen Fire Brigade and the Copenhagen Port Authority. From 1773 to 1783, he was president of the Royal Danish Agricultural Society (Det Kongelige Danske Landhusholdningsselskab).

Bugge's personal library contained 15,000 volumes. Most of them and many of his instruments were lost during the bombardment of Copenhagen in 1807. He managed to save the original drawings and copper plates as well as the associated journals and calculations for the special maps of Denmark.

He published a number of textbooks on mathematics and astronomy as well as numerous articles in the journals of the Danish and Swedish scientific academies and Philosophical Transactions as well as a number of observations in Astron. Jahrbuch (Bode) and Monatl. Correspondenz (v. Zach).

He was three times elected as rector of the University of Copenhagen (1789–1790, 1801–1802, 1810–1811). He was a foreign member of the scientific academies in Petersborg, Pisa, London, Stockholm, Mannheim, Haarlem and Trondheim. He was also a member of the Scandinavian Literary Society in Copenhagen.

== Personal life ==
On 7 January 1771 in Svallerup, Bugge married Ambrosia (Amborg) Wedseltoft (1742–1795), daughter of pastor Simonsen Wedseltoft (1706–1782) and Inger Magdalene From (c. 1715–1778). They had eight children.

Bugge was appointed justitsråd in 1784 and etatsråd in 1810. He was created a Knight in the Order of the Dannebrog in 1809. He died on 15 January 1815 and was buried in Assistens Cemetery.

== Written works ==
- Beskrivelse over den Opmaalingsmaade, som er brugt ved de danske geographiske Karter (1779)
- De første Grunde til Regning, Geometrie, Plan-Trigonometrie og Landmaaling (1795)
- Den oekonomiske og militaire Landmaaling (1814)

Cultural offices
Preceded by Jakob Edvard Colbjørnsen	Rector of the University of Copenhagen; 1789 – 1790	Succeeded by Daniel Gotthilf Moldenhawer
Preceded by Johan Clemens Tode	Rector of the University of Copenhagen; 1801–1802	Succeeded by Friedrich Münter
Preceded by Frederik Theodor Hurtigkar	Rector of the University of Copenhagen; 1810–1811	Succeeded by Claus Hornemann
