= Pythagoras (crater) =

Crater on the Moon

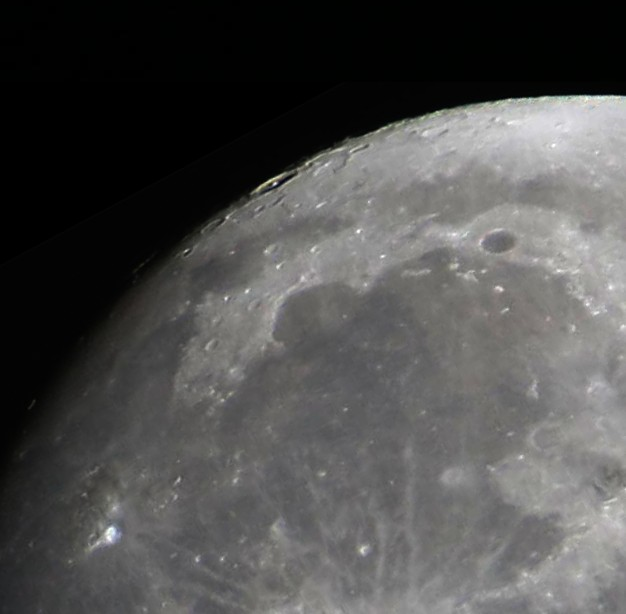
- Pythagoras shadowed with its central peak seen near the terminator boundary
- Coordinates: 63.5°N 62.8°W
- Diameter: 130 km
- Depth: 5.0 km
- Colongitude: 60° at sunrise
- Formation: Eratosthenian
- Eponym: Pythagoras

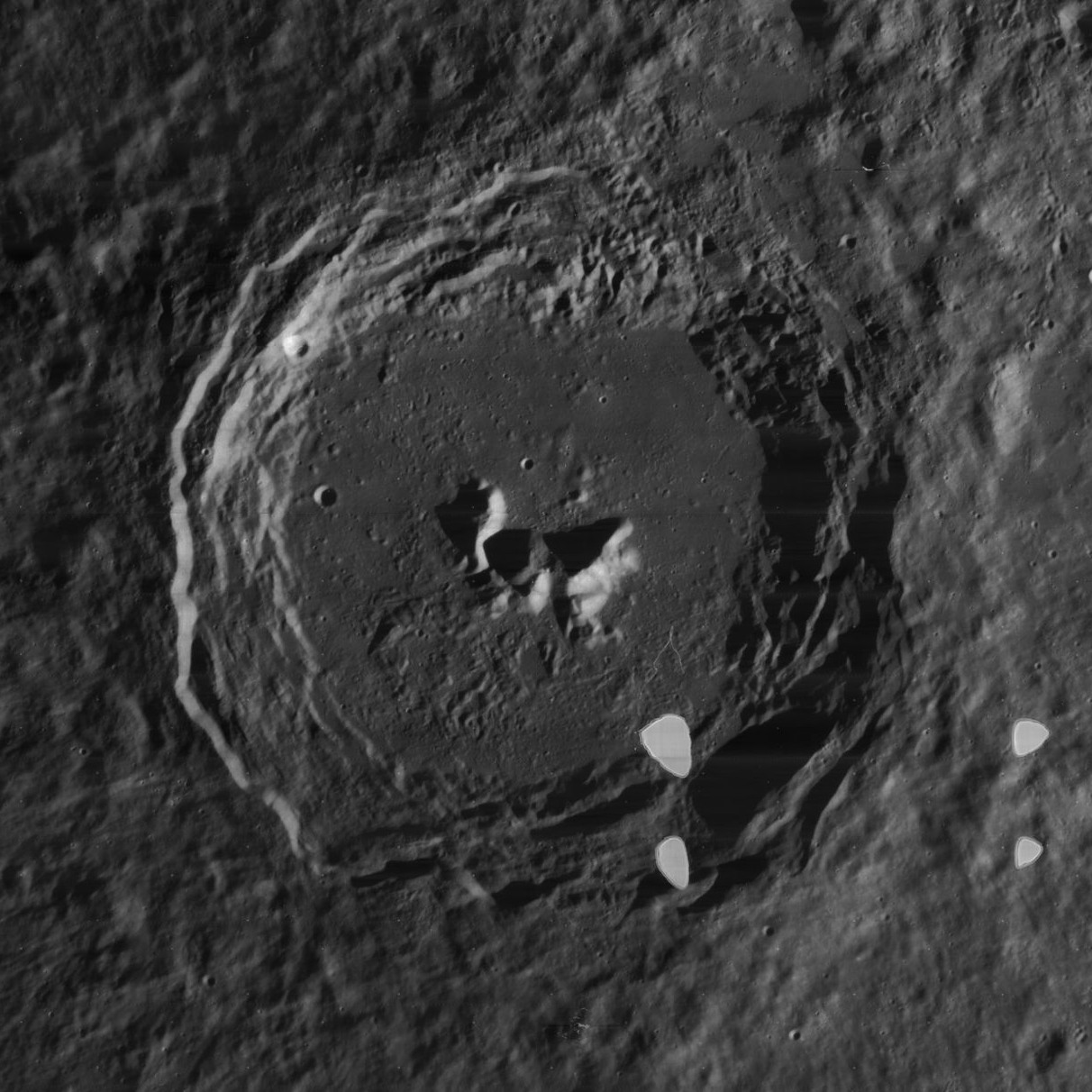
Lunar Orbiter 4 image (four light spots are blemishes on original)

Pythagoras is a prominent impact crater located near the northwestern limb of the Moon. T. W. Webb described it as "the deepest walled plain" in this quadrant of the visible Moon. It lies just to the northwest of the somewhat larger Babbage. The crater has an oval appearance due to the oblique viewing angle. Only the western face of the interior can be viewed from the Earth, the other side being permanently out of sight.

On the lunar geologic timescale, Pythagoras is a crater of Eratosthenian age. The well-preserved rim of Pythagoras has a wide terrace system, and a slight rampart around the exterior. Although generally circular, the crater outline has a hexagonal form. The floor is flattened, but with an irregular, hilly surface. There is evidence of landslips around the periphery. In the center is a sharp, mountainous rise with a double peak that ascends 1.5 kilometers above the crater floor. Anorthosite with a very low mafic abundance and the infrared spectrum of pure crystalline plagioclase has been identified in the central peaks.

This crater is named after Greek mathematician and philosopher Pythagoras of Samos (c. 570 – c. 495 BC). Its designation was formally adopted by the International Astronomical Union in 1935. The name was incorporated into lunar nomenclature by Italian astronomer Giovanni Riccioli in 1651.

== Satellite craters ==
By convention these features are identified on lunar maps by placing the letter on the side of the crater midpoint that is closest to Pythagoras.

Pythagoras	Latitude	Longitude	Diameter
B	66.1° N	73.0° W	17 km
D	64.5° N	72.0° W	30 km
G	67.8° N	75.3° W	16 km
H	67.1° N	73.3° W	18 km
K	67.3° N	75.4° W	12 km
L	67.3° N	77.6° W	12 km
M	67.5° N	81.1° W	10 km
N	66.6° N	78.1° W	14 km
P	65.3° N	75.2° W	10 km
S	67.7° N	64.7° W	8 km
T	62.5° N	51.4° W	6 km
W	63.1° N	48.9° W	4 km
