= Chi Orionis =

Chi Orionis (Chi Ori, χ Orionis, χ Ori) is the name of two stars:

- χ^{1} Orionis (54 Orionis, HD 39587)
- χ^{2} Orionis (62 Orionis, HD 41117)

In Johann Bode’s Uranographia though, the designations were changed, although the designations were reverted to the original designation later on. The stars’ former designations are listed below.

- χ^{1} Orionis (54 Orionis, HD 39587)
- χ^{2} Orionis (57 Orionis, HD 39698)
- χ^{3} Orionis (62 Orionis, HD 41117)
- χ^{4} Orionis (64 Orionis, HD 41040)

All of them were member of asterism 司怪 (Sī Guài), Deity in Charge of Monsters, Turtle Beak mansion.
