= (322756) 2001 CK32 =

Asteroid

2001 CK_{32}
Discovery
- Discovered by: LINEAR
- Discovery date: 13 February 2001

Designations
- Minor planet category: NEO; Aten; Mercury grazer; Venus crosser; Earth crosser

Orbital characteristics
- Epoch 13 January 2016 (JD 2457400.5)
- Uncertainty parameter 0
- Observation arc: 4777 days (13.08 yr)
- Aphelion: 1.002762662 AU (150.0111591 Gm)
- Perihelion: 0.44776848 AU (66.985211 Gm)
- Semi-major axis: 0.725265571 AU (108.4981851 Gm)
- Eccentricity: 0.3826145
- Orbital period (sidereal): 0.62 yr (225.6 d)
- Mean anomaly: 197.81721°
- Mean motion: 1.5957266°/day
- Inclination: 8.1302858°
- Longitude of ascending node: 109.44400°
- Argument of perihelion: 234.11841°
- Earth MOID: 0.0769248 AU (11.50779 Gm)
- T_{Jupiter}: 7.857

Physical characteristics
- Dimensions: 800 m^{[a]}
- Absolute magnitude (H): 19.0

(322756) 2001 CK_{32} is a sub-kilometer asteroid and near-Earth object of the Aten group. It is also a transient Venus co-orbital, and a Mercury grazer as well as an Earth crosser. It was once designated as a potentially hazardous asteroid.

== See also ==
- 524522 Zoozve
- 2012 XE133
- 2013 ND15

== Notes ==
- This is assuming an albedo of 0.25–0.05.
