= Seppo Mikkola =

Finnish astronomer

Seppo Mikkola (born 1947) is a Finnish astronomer. He is a senior lecturer at the University of Turku and staff member at Tuorla Observatory.

Mikkola is a leading expert in celestial mechanics. He has made fundamental contributions to the theory of regularization of motion in the gravitational N-body problem. Mikkola was a member of the team that determined the unusual orbit of 3753 Cruithne. He was also the a member of the team that identified 524522 Zoozve as a quasi-satellite of Venus, in 2004, two years after the actual discovery of the object.

== Named after him ==
- Asteroid 3381 Mikkola
