= Oenopides (crater) =

Crater on the Moon

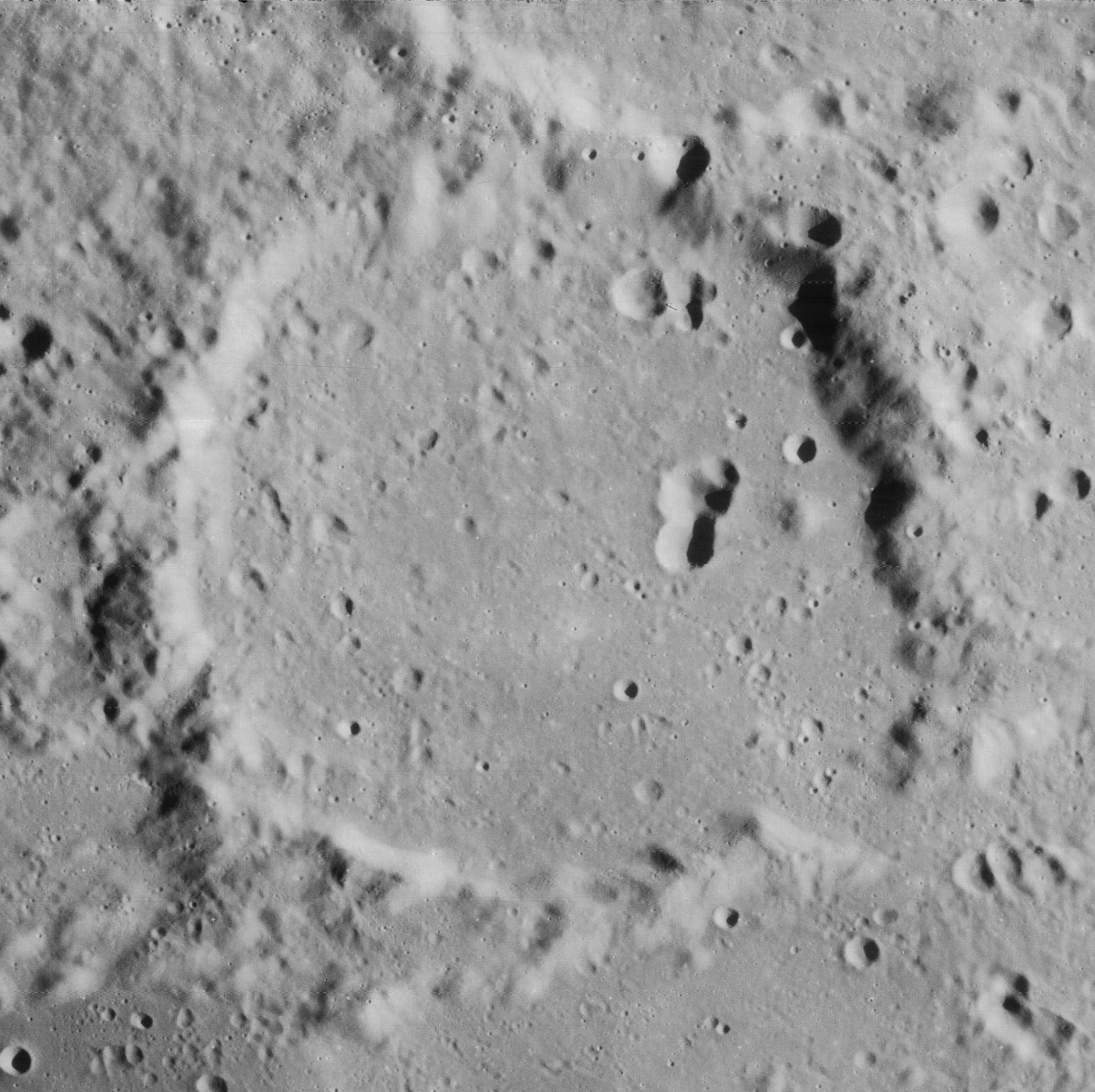
- Lunar Orbiter 4 image
- Coordinates: 57.0°N 64.1°W
- Diameter: 67 km
- Depth: Unknown
- Colongitude: 66° at sunrise
- Eponym: Oenopides of Chios

Oenopides is a lunar impact crater that is located near the northwestern limb of the Moon, and so appears foreshortened when viewed from the Earth. This formation lies due south of the prominent crater Pythagoras, and is attached to the southwest rim of Babbage E. The southwest rim of Oenopides is part of the northern edge of Oceanus Procellarum. To the south is Markov.

This formation is an old crater that has been heavily eroded by subsequent impacts, leaving a low outer rim that is generally hilly and contains a few clefts. There is a gap in the southeastern rim, and the level interior is attached to the lunar mare to the south. There are several small craters lying near the eastern rim, and the remainder of the floor is marked by tiny craterlets.

To the southwest is the remnant of Oenopides R, of which only parts of the rim are still protruding above the surface and the southern rim is completely missing.

== Satellite craters ==
By convention these features are identified on lunar maps by placing the letter on the side of the crater midpoint that is closest to Oenopides.

Oenopides	Latitude	Longitude	Diameter
B	58.5° N	68.6° W	34 km
K	55.8° N	61.2° W	6 km
L	55.5° N	61.9° W	10 km
M	55.5° N	61.1° W	6 km
R	55.6° N	67.9° W	56 km
S	58.1° N	69.9° W	7 km
T	57.2° N	68.9° W	8 km
X	57.5° N	62.4° W	5 km
Y	57.0° N	63.3° W	6 km
Z	58.9° N	67.0° W	7 km
