= 2013 ND15 =

Venus trojan asteroid

2013 ND_{15}
Discovery
- Discovered by: Pan-STARRS
- Discovery date: 13 July 2013

Designations
- Minor planet category: Aten asteroid; Mercury crosser; Venus crosser; Earth crosser

Orbital characteristics
- Epoch 13 January 2016 (JD 2457400.5)
- Uncertainty parameter 7
- Aphelion: 1.1660 AU (174.43 Gm)
- Perihelion: 0.28100 AU (42.037 Gm)
- Semi-major axis: 0.72351 AU (108.236 Gm)
- Eccentricity: 0.61162
- Orbital period (sidereal): 0.62 yr (224.8 d)
- Mean anomaly: 198.82°
- Mean motion: 1.6015°/day
- Inclination: 4.7962°
- Longitude of ascending node: 95.841°
- Argument of perihelion: 19.697°
- Earth MOID: 0.00751978 AU (1,124,943 km)
- Jupiter MOID: 3.95146 AU (591.130 Gm)

Physical characteristics
- Dimensions: 40–100 m^{[a]}
- Absolute magnitude (H): 24.1

2013 ND_{15} is a small asteroid that is a temporary trojan of Venus. Located at Venus's L_{4}, it is the first known Venus trojan.

== Discovery, orbit and physical properties ==
2013 ND_{15} was discovered on 13 July 2013 by N. Primak, A. Schultz, T. Goggia and K. Chambers, observing for the Pan-STARRS project. As of September 2014, it has been observed 21 times with a data-arc span of 26 days. It is an Aten asteroid and its semi-major axis (0.7235 astronomical units; AU) is very similar to that of Venus but it has a high eccentricity (0.6115) and a small orbital inclination (4.794°). With an absolute magnitude of 24.1, it has a diameter in the range 40–100 m (for an assumed albedo range of 0.04–0.20).

== Trojan dynamical state and orbital evolution ==
Animation of 2013 ND_{15} relative to Sun and Venus Sun · Venus · 2013 ND_{15}

2013 ND_{15} has been identified as a Venus trojan following a tadpole orbit around Venus's Lagrangian point L_{4}. Besides being a Venus co-orbital, this asteroid is also a Mercury crosser and an Earth crosser. 2013 ND_{15} exhibits resonant (or near-resonant) behavior with Mercury, Venus and Earth. Its short-term dynamical evolution is different from that of the other three Venus co-orbitals, 2001 CK32, Zoozve, and 2012 XE133.

== Potentially hazardous asteroid ==
2013 ND_{15} is not included in the Minor Planet Center list of potentially hazardous asteroids (PHAs) because its absolute magnitude is greater than 22.0, even though it comes to within 0.05 AU of Earth periodically. It approached Earth at 0.077 AU on 21 June 2016.

== See also ==
- (322756) 2001 CK32
- 524522 Zoozve
- 2012 XE133

== Notes ==
- This is assuming an albedo of 0.20–0.04.
