= J. Herschel (crater) =

Crater on the Moon

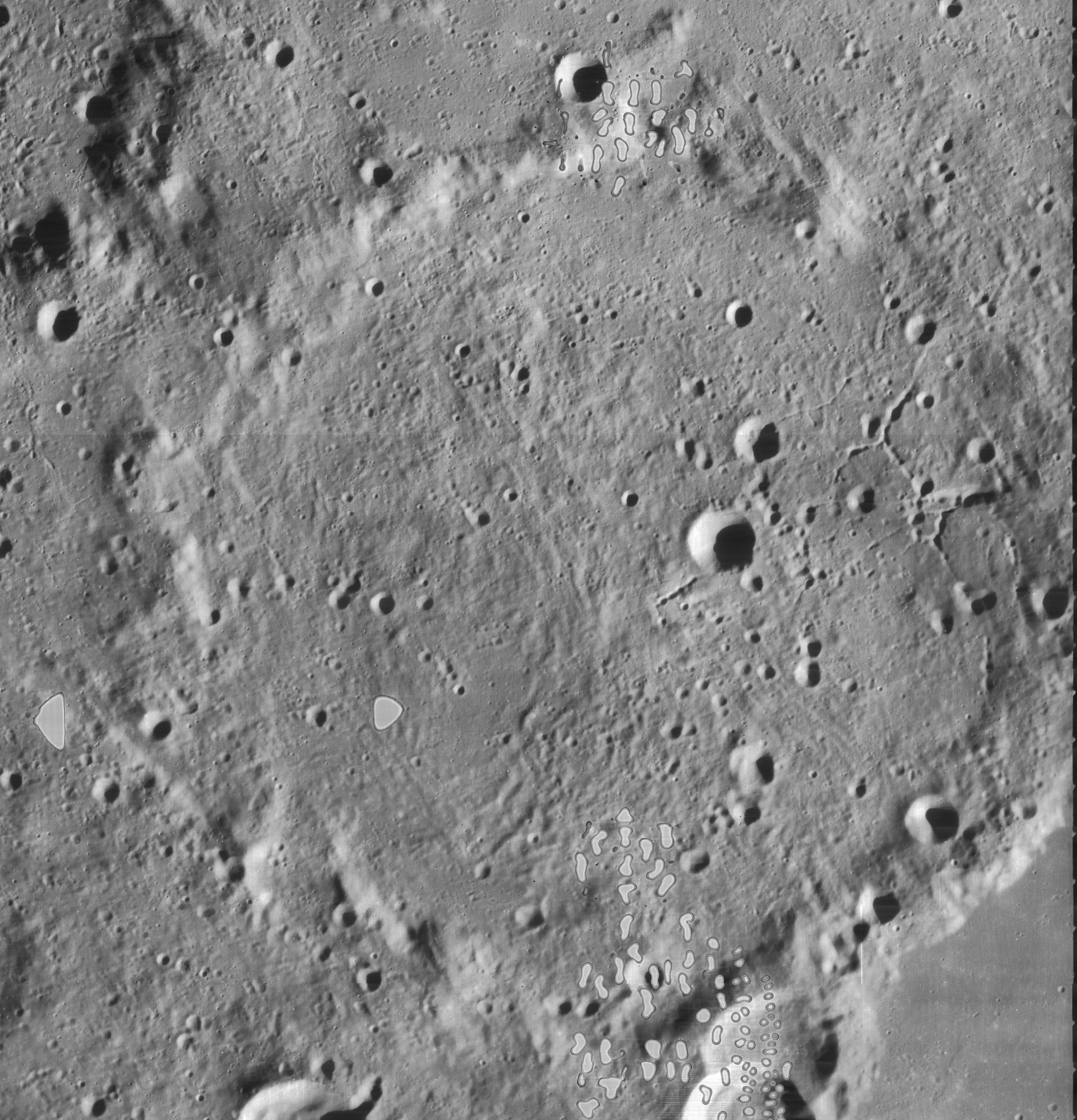
- Lunar Orbiter 4 image
- Coordinates: 62.0°N 42.0°W
- Diameter: 154 km
- Colongitude: 46° at sunrise
- Eponym: John Herschel

J. Herschel is a large lunar impact crater of the variety termed a walled plain. The crater is named after British astronomer John Herschel. It is located in the northern part of the Moon's surface, and so appears foreshortened when viewed from the Earth. The southeastern rim of J. Herschel forms part of the edge of the Mare Frigoris lunar mare. To the northwest is the crater Anaximander. Bordering the northern rim is a large, unnamed lunar plain. Just to the south is the small crater Horrebow.

The rim of this crater has been heavily eroded, to the point where it is frequently described as "considerably disintegrated". The remaining rim survives as a ring of ridges that have been resculpted by subsequent impacts. The interior floor is relatively level, but irregular and marked by a multitude of tiny impacts. The most notable of these are the satellite craters C, D, K, and L, listed in the table below. Horrebow A is attached to the southern rim of the crater, and is overlapped along its southwest rim by Horrebow.

== Satellite craters ==
By convention these features are identified on lunar maps by placing the letter on the side of the crater midpoint that is closest to J. Herschel.

J. Herschel	Latitude	Longitude	Diameter
B	59.9° N	38.8° W	7 km
C	62.3° N	39.9° W	12 km
D	60.4° N	38.0° W	10 km
F	58.8° N	35.4° W	19 km
K	62.9° N	39.3° W	8 km
L	61.0° N	40.0° W	7 km
M	57.3° N	32.9° W	9 km
N	60.0° N	32.8° W	7 km
P	63.5° N	32.8° W	6 km
R	62.5° N	30.6° W	9 km
