= List of minor planets: 764001–765000 =

The following is a partial list of minor planets, running from minor-planet number 764001 through 765000, inclusive. The primary data for this and other partial lists is based on JPL's "Small-Body Orbital Elements" and data available from the Minor Planet Center. Critical list information is also provided by the MPC, unless otherwise specified from Lowell Observatory. A detailed description of the table's columns and additional sources are given on the main page including a complete list of every page in this series, and a statistical break-up on the dynamical classification of minor planets.

Also see the summary list of all named bodies in numerical and alphabetical order, and the corresponding naming citations for the number range of this particular list. New namings may only be added to this list after official publication, as the preannouncement of names is condemned by the Working Group for Small Bodies Nomenclature of the International Astronomical Union.

Near-Earth obj.	MBA (inner)	MBA (outer)	Centaur
Mars-crosser	MBA (middle)	Jupiter trojan	Trans-Neptunian obj.
Unclassified

== 764001–764100 ==
Designation			Discovery			Properties		Ref
Permanent	Provisional	Named after	Date	Site	Discoverer(s)	Category	Diam.	Ref
764001	2012 TA_{141}	—	October 5, 2012	Haleakala	Pan-STARRS 1	ARM	2.5 km	MPC · JPL
764002	2012 TL_{141}	—	October 5, 2012	Haleakala	Pan-STARRS 1	·	2.4 km	MPC · JPL
764003	2012 TB_{142}	—	November 21, 2003	Kitt Peak	Spacewatch	·	1.4 km	MPC · JPL
764004	2012 TW_{142}	—	October 7, 2012	Haleakala	Pan-STARRS 1	·	2.3 km	MPC · JPL
764005	2012 TK_{148}	—	October 8, 2012	Haleakala	Pan-STARRS 1	·	1.9 km	MPC · JPL
764006	2012 TB_{149}	—	October 8, 2012	Mount Lemmon	Mount Lemmon Survey	·	2.1 km	MPC · JPL
764007	2012 TN_{155}	—	October 8, 2012	Haleakala	Pan-STARRS 1	·	2.1 km	MPC · JPL
764008	2012 TU_{163}	—	October 14, 2001	Apache Point	SDSS	·	1.7 km	MPC · JPL
764009	2012 TL_{170}	—	October 6, 2012	Mount Lemmon	Mount Lemmon Survey	VER	2.0 km	MPC · JPL
764010	2012 TJ_{173}	—	January 22, 2006	Mount Lemmon	Mount Lemmon Survey	·	780 m	MPC · JPL
764011	2012 TC_{174}	—	September 21, 2012	Kitt Peak	Spacewatch	·	2.1 km	MPC · JPL
764012	2012 TZ_{176}	—	October 9, 2012	Haleakala	Pan-STARRS 1	EOS	1.4 km	MPC · JPL
764013	2012 TR_{179}	—	December 4, 2007	Mount Lemmon	Mount Lemmon Survey	·	2.2 km	MPC · JPL
764014	2012 TS_{181}	—	October 9, 2012	Haleakala	Pan-STARRS 1	·	2.6 km	MPC · JPL
764015	2012 TB_{184}	—	November 2, 2007	Mount Lemmon	Mount Lemmon Survey	·	2.0 km	MPC · JPL
764016	2012 TQ_{189}	—	November 8, 2007	Kitt Peak	Spacewatch	THM	1.9 km	MPC · JPL
764017	2012 TS_{194}	—	October 10, 2012	Kitt Peak	Spacewatch	·	2.3 km	MPC · JPL
764018	2012 TX_{197}	—	October 10, 2012	Kislovodsk	ISON-Kislovodsk Observatory	·	2.9 km	MPC · JPL
764019	2012 TX_{203}	—	September 12, 2001	Kitt Peak	Deep Ecliptic Survey	EOS	1.4 km	MPC · JPL
764020	2012 TH_{206}	—	October 11, 2012	Mount Lemmon	Mount Lemmon Survey	·	2.1 km	MPC · JPL
764021	2012 TV_{206}	—	October 11, 2012	Mount Lemmon	Mount Lemmon Survey	·	1.9 km	MPC · JPL
764022	2012 TT_{208}	—	September 19, 2012	Mount Lemmon	Mount Lemmon Survey	·	2.5 km	MPC · JPL
764023	2012 TO_{209}	—	October 11, 2012	Mount Lemmon	Mount Lemmon Survey	·	1.7 km	MPC · JPL
764024	2012 TL_{212}	—	October 11, 2012	Haleakala	Pan-STARRS 1	EOS	1.4 km	MPC · JPL
764025	2012 TY_{215}	—	September 18, 2012	Mount Lemmon	Mount Lemmon Survey	·	3.3 km	MPC · JPL
764026	2012 TX_{221}	—	October 14, 2012	Mount Lemmon	Mount Lemmon Survey	VER	1.8 km	MPC · JPL
764027	2012 TC_{222}	—	September 17, 2012	Mount Lemmon	Mount Lemmon Survey	·	2.1 km	MPC · JPL
764028	2012 TJ_{232}	—	September 15, 2012	Mount Lemmon	Mount Lemmon Survey	·	2.5 km	MPC · JPL
764029	2012 TU_{233}	—	September 24, 2012	Kitt Peak	Spacewatch	THM	1.5 km	MPC · JPL
764030	2012 TR_{234}	—	October 7, 2012	Haleakala	Pan-STARRS 1	·	940 m	MPC · JPL
764031	2012 TJ_{237}	—	October 21, 1995	Kitt Peak	Spacewatch	·	2.6 km	MPC · JPL
764032	2012 TX_{238}	—	October 7, 2012	Haleakala	Pan-STARRS 1	·	2.4 km	MPC · JPL
764033	2012 TF_{239}	—	September 16, 2012	Kitt Peak	Spacewatch	·	940 m	MPC · JPL
764034	2012 TA_{244}	—	October 8, 2012	Mount Lemmon	Mount Lemmon Survey	THM	1.8 km	MPC · JPL
764035	2012 TK_{249}	—	October 11, 2012	Haleakala	Pan-STARRS 1	(895)	3.0 km	MPC · JPL
764036	2012 TP_{249}	—	November 2, 2007	Kitt Peak	Spacewatch	·	1.9 km	MPC · JPL
764037	2012 TU_{249}	—	October 8, 2012	Nogales	M. Schwartz, P. R. Holvorcem	·	1.0 km	MPC · JPL
764038	2012 TH_{250}	—	September 17, 2006	Kitt Peak	Spacewatch	·	2.4 km	MPC · JPL
764039	2012 TF_{251}	—	September 25, 2006	Mount Lemmon	Mount Lemmon Survey	ELF	2.4 km	MPC · JPL
764040	2012 TU_{251}	—	October 11, 2012	Haleakala	Pan-STARRS 1	V	540 m	MPC · JPL
764041	2012 TL_{262}	—	September 22, 2012	Kitt Peak	Spacewatch	PHO	680 m	MPC · JPL
764042	2012 TP_{262}	—	September 23, 2012	Mount Lemmon	Mount Lemmon Survey	·	2.3 km	MPC · JPL
764043	2012 TJ_{263}	—	October 8, 2012	Haleakala	Pan-STARRS 1	VER	2.1 km	MPC · JPL
764044	2012 TP_{271}	—	October 20, 2003	Kitt Peak	Spacewatch	·	1.4 km	MPC · JPL
764045	2012 TV_{275}	—	October 11, 2012	Haleakala	Pan-STARRS 1	·	2.0 km	MPC · JPL
764046	2012 TZ_{275}	—	October 11, 2012	Haleakala	Pan-STARRS 1	HYG	2.2 km	MPC · JPL
764047	2012 TO_{276}	—	October 11, 2012	Haleakala	Pan-STARRS 1	·	2.5 km	MPC · JPL
764048	2012 TJ_{278}	—	September 14, 2006	Kitt Peak	Spacewatch	·	2.0 km	MPC · JPL
764049	2012 TU_{278}	—	April 3, 2011	Haleakala	Pan-STARRS 1	·	1 km	MPC · JPL
764050	2012 TA_{282}	—	October 11, 2012	Mount Lemmon	Mount Lemmon Survey	L5	7.5 km	MPC · JPL
764051	2012 TG_{282}	—	May 29, 2003	Cerro Tololo	Deep Ecliptic Survey	LUT	2.8 km	MPC · JPL
764052	2012 TY_{283}	—	October 15, 2012	Nogales	M. Schwartz, P. R. Holvorcem	·	2.2 km	MPC · JPL
764053	2012 TH_{284}	—	October 15, 2012	Mount Lemmon	Mount Lemmon Survey	·	2.5 km	MPC · JPL
764054	2012 TN_{285}	—	September 26, 2012	Mount Lemmon	Mount Lemmon Survey	THM	1.9 km	MPC · JPL
764055	2012 TS_{287}	—	October 10, 2012	Mount Lemmon	Mount Lemmon Survey	TIR	2.4 km	MPC · JPL
764056	2012 TH_{289}	—	October 10, 2012	Mount Lemmon	Mount Lemmon Survey	ARM	3.1 km	MPC · JPL
764057	2012 TT_{289}	—	October 11, 2012	Kitt Peak	Spacewatch	·	2.3 km	MPC · JPL
764058	2012 TK_{298}	—	August 29, 2011	Haleakala	Pan-STARRS 1	L5	6.1 km	MPC · JPL
764059	2012 TJ_{299}	—	April 10, 2005	Kitt Peak	Deep Ecliptic Survey	HOF	2.0 km	MPC · JPL
764060	2012 TN_{301}	—	October 7, 2012	Haleakala	Pan-STARRS 1	·	1.1 km	MPC · JPL
764061	2012 TM_{304}	—	October 8, 2012	Haleakala	Pan-STARRS 1	·	2.5 km	MPC · JPL
764062	2012 TE_{306}	—	October 27, 2008	Kitt Peak	Spacewatch	(5)	1.0 km	MPC · JPL
764063	2012 TJ_{309}	—	October 11, 2012	Mount Lemmon	Mount Lemmon Survey	L5	7.5 km	MPC · JPL
764064	2012 TW_{318}	—	October 8, 2012	Haleakala	Pan-STARRS 1	·	2.7 km	MPC · JPL
764065	2012 TL_{323}	—	October 10, 2012	Mount Lemmon	Mount Lemmon Survey	VER	1.9 km	MPC · JPL
764066	2012 TB_{324}	—	August 12, 2004	Cerro Tololo	Deep Ecliptic Survey	·	920 m	MPC · JPL
764067	2012 TV_{324}	—	October 6, 2012	Mount Lemmon	Mount Lemmon Survey	·	1.8 km	MPC · JPL
764068	2012 TX_{325}	—	October 8, 2012	Mount Lemmon	Mount Lemmon Survey	KOR	1.0 km	MPC · JPL
764069	2012 TX_{326}	—	September 9, 2008	Mount Lemmon	Mount Lemmon Survey	·	880 m	MPC · JPL
764070	2012 TP_{333}	—	October 11, 2012	Mount Lemmon	Mount Lemmon Survey	·	2.3 km	MPC · JPL
764071	2012 TN_{334}	—	October 8, 2012	Haleakala	Pan-STARRS 1	·	1.6 km	MPC · JPL
764072	2012 TV_{336}	—	October 6, 2012	Mount Lemmon	Mount Lemmon Survey	·	2.2 km	MPC · JPL
764073	2012 TX_{337}	—	October 6, 2012	Mount Lemmon	Mount Lemmon Survey	TIR	2.3 km	MPC · JPL
764074	2012 TJ_{338}	—	October 11, 2012	Haleakala	Pan-STARRS 1	3:2 · SHU	3.4 km	MPC · JPL
764075	2012 TR_{338}	—	January 23, 2015	Haleakala	Pan-STARRS 1	·	2.2 km	MPC · JPL
764076	2012 TV_{338}	—	August 10, 2016	Haleakala	Pan-STARRS 1	·	950 m	MPC · JPL
764077	2012 TK_{339}	—	December 28, 2013	Kitt Peak	Spacewatch	·	1.8 km	MPC · JPL
764078	2012 TG_{342}	—	October 10, 2012	Mount Lemmon	Mount Lemmon Survey	·	2.0 km	MPC · JPL
764079	2012 TF_{344}	—	October 8, 2012	Haleakala	Pan-STARRS 1	·	2.5 km	MPC · JPL
764080	2012 TG_{344}	—	October 15, 2012	Kitt Peak	Spacewatch	(22805)	2.7 km	MPC · JPL
764081	2012 TZ_{344}	—	October 8, 2012	Mount Lemmon	Mount Lemmon Survey	L5	7.6 km	MPC · JPL
764082	2012 TM_{346}	—	October 8, 2012	Mount Lemmon	Mount Lemmon Survey	·	2.1 km	MPC · JPL
764083	2012 TH_{347}	—	October 15, 2012	Haleakala	Pan-STARRS 1	·	2.4 km	MPC · JPL
764084	2012 TC_{348}	—	October 8, 2012	Haleakala	Pan-STARRS 1	·	2.2 km	MPC · JPL
764085	2012 TA_{351}	—	October 14, 2012	Mount Lemmon	Mount Lemmon Survey	·	2.1 km	MPC · JPL
764086	2012 TL_{353}	—	January 28, 2015	Haleakala	Pan-STARRS 1	URS	2.7 km	MPC · JPL
764087	2012 TM_{353}	—	October 10, 2012	Haleakala	Pan-STARRS 1	·	2.6 km	MPC · JPL
764088	2012 TZ_{355}	—	October 9, 2012	Mount Lemmon	Mount Lemmon Survey	·	1.7 km	MPC · JPL
764089	2012 TR_{356}	—	October 4, 2012	Mount Lemmon	Mount Lemmon Survey	·	2.1 km	MPC · JPL
764090	2012 TR_{357}	—	October 8, 2012	Mount Lemmon	Mount Lemmon Survey	·	2.3 km	MPC · JPL
764091	2012 TL_{358}	—	October 14, 2012	Kitt Peak	Spacewatch	·	2.5 km	MPC · JPL
764092	2012 TM_{358}	—	October 4, 2012	Nogales	M. Schwartz, P. R. Holvorcem	·	2.9 km	MPC · JPL
764093	2012 TX_{358}	—	October 8, 2012	Mount Lemmon	Mount Lemmon Survey	·	1.3 km	MPC · JPL
764094	2012 TC_{359}	—	October 8, 2012	Mount Lemmon	Mount Lemmon Survey	L5	5.9 km	MPC · JPL
764095	2012 TR_{359}	—	October 11, 2012	Haleakala	Pan-STARRS 1	VER	1.9 km	MPC · JPL
764096	2012 TH_{360}	—	October 15, 2012	Mount Lemmon	Mount Lemmon Survey	·	1.0 km	MPC · JPL
764097	2012 TQ_{360}	—	October 15, 2012	Haleakala	Pan-STARRS 1	L5	5.7 km	MPC · JPL
764098	2012 TV_{360}	—	October 8, 2012	Haleakala	Pan-STARRS 1	·	2.4 km	MPC · JPL
764099	2012 TH_{361}	—	October 14, 2012	Mount Lemmon	Mount Lemmon Survey	·	1.8 km	MPC · JPL
764100	2012 TN_{361}	—	October 10, 2012	Mount Lemmon	Mount Lemmon Survey	·	2.4 km	MPC · JPL

== 764101–764200 ==
back to top

Designation			Discovery			Properties		Ref
Permanent	Provisional	Named after	Date	Site	Discoverer(s)	Category	Diam.	Ref
764101	2012 TZ_{362}	—	October 8, 2012	Haleakala	Pan-STARRS 1	·	2.1 km	MPC · JPL
764102	2012 TH_{363}	—	October 11, 2012	Haleakala	Pan-STARRS 1	L5	6.7 km	MPC · JPL
764103	2012 TZ_{364}	—	October 11, 2012	Haleakala	Pan-STARRS 1	·	860 m	MPC · JPL
764104	2012 TB_{367}	—	October 11, 2012	Haleakala	Pan-STARRS 1	·	1.2 km	MPC · JPL
764105	2012 TM_{368}	—	October 11, 2012	Haleakala	Pan-STARRS 1	L5	5.8 km	MPC · JPL
764106	2012 TH_{370}	—	October 6, 2012	Haleakala	Pan-STARRS 1	·	2.1 km	MPC · JPL
764107	2012 TY_{370}	—	October 8, 2012	Kitt Peak	Spacewatch	·	2.4 km	MPC · JPL
764108	2012 TC_{371}	—	October 8, 2012	Kitt Peak	Spacewatch	·	2.1 km	MPC · JPL
764109	2012 TF_{371}	—	October 6, 2012	Mount Lemmon	Mount Lemmon Survey	·	2.1 km	MPC · JPL
764110	2012 TB_{372}	—	September 29, 2003	Kitt Peak	Spacewatch	·	1.3 km	MPC · JPL
764111	2012 TB_{375}	—	October 7, 2012	Haleakala	Pan-STARRS 1	·	2.1 km	MPC · JPL
764112	2012 TR_{382}	—	October 11, 2012	Haleakala	Pan-STARRS 1	·	1.8 km	MPC · JPL
764113	2012 TS_{382}	—	October 8, 2012	Mount Lemmon	Mount Lemmon Survey	L5	6.4 km	MPC · JPL
764114	2012 TU_{386}	—	October 8, 2012	Mount Lemmon	Mount Lemmon Survey	·	1.4 km	MPC · JPL
764115	2012 TL_{387}	—	October 11, 2012	Mount Lemmon	Mount Lemmon Survey	L5	6.2 km	MPC · JPL
764116	2012 TU_{389}	—	October 9, 2012	Haleakala	Pan-STARRS 1	·	920 m	MPC · JPL
764117	2012 TX_{391}	—	October 10, 2012	Mount Lemmon	Mount Lemmon Survey	EOS	1.5 km	MPC · JPL
764118	2012 TS_{396}	—	October 9, 2012	Mount Lemmon	Mount Lemmon Survey	VER	2.2 km	MPC · JPL
764119	2012 TY_{397}	—	October 11, 2012	Mount Lemmon	Mount Lemmon Survey	·	2.1 km	MPC · JPL
764120	2012 TY_{399}	—	October 8, 2012	Haleakala	Pan-STARRS 1	·	2.2 km	MPC · JPL
764121	2012 UC_{2}	—	February 21, 2007	Kitt Peak	Deep Ecliptic Survey	3:2 · SHU	4.3 km	MPC · JPL
764122	2012 UL_{2}	—	March 1, 2009	Kitt Peak	Spacewatch	·	2.2 km	MPC · JPL
764123	2012 UK_{3}	—	October 2, 2008	Mount Lemmon	Mount Lemmon Survey	·	1.1 km	MPC · JPL
764124	2012 UC_{4}	—	October 16, 2012	Mount Lemmon	Mount Lemmon Survey	·	2.2 km	MPC · JPL
764125	2012 UE_{12}	—	October 8, 2012	Mount Lemmon	Mount Lemmon Survey	·	1.3 km	MPC · JPL
764126	2012 UQ_{12}	—	October 16, 2012	Mount Lemmon	Mount Lemmon Survey	·	2.0 km	MPC · JPL
764127	2012 UK_{14}	—	October 8, 2012	Mount Lemmon	Mount Lemmon Survey	·	1.1 km	MPC · JPL
764128	2012 UA_{15}	—	September 18, 2012	Kitt Peak	Spacewatch	NYS	1.1 km	MPC · JPL
764129	2012 UB_{15}	—	August 10, 2008	La Sagra	OAM	MAS	620 m	MPC · JPL
764130	2012 UK_{16}	—	October 16, 2012	Mount Lemmon	Mount Lemmon Survey	·	1.1 km	MPC · JPL
764131	2012 UN_{19}	—	March 25, 2011	Kitt Peak	Spacewatch	MAS	540 m	MPC · JPL
764132	2012 UO_{23}	—	October 17, 2012	Mount Lemmon	Mount Lemmon Survey	·	2.2 km	MPC · JPL
764133	2012 UN_{27}	—	November 20, 2001	Socorro	LINEAR	·	2.7 km	MPC · JPL
764134	2012 UA_{28}	—	August 28, 2012	Mount Lemmon	Mount Lemmon Survey	·	2.4 km	MPC · JPL
764135	2012 UJ_{28}	—	October 16, 2012	Kitt Peak	Spacewatch	·	1.1 km	MPC · JPL
764136	2012 UF_{41}	—	September 25, 2012	Mount Lemmon	Mount Lemmon Survey	LIX	2.4 km	MPC · JPL
764137	2012 UW_{41}	—	March 29, 2009	Kitt Peak	Spacewatch	·	2.4 km	MPC · JPL
764138	2012 UT_{42}	—	October 17, 2012	Haleakala	Pan-STARRS 1	VER	2.2 km	MPC · JPL
764139	2012 UR_{56}	—	October 8, 2012	Mount Lemmon	Mount Lemmon Survey	·	1.2 km	MPC · JPL
764140	2012 UE_{60}	—	September 24, 2012	Mount Lemmon	Mount Lemmon Survey	VER	2.2 km	MPC · JPL
764141	2012 UJ_{78}	—	October 19, 2012	Haleakala	Pan-STARRS 1	·	1.9 km	MPC · JPL
764142	2012 UD_{87}	—	October 21, 2012	Haleakala	Pan-STARRS 1	·	2.9 km	MPC · JPL
764143	2012 UQ_{96}	—	October 17, 2012	Haleakala	Pan-STARRS 1	·	2.3 km	MPC · JPL
764144	2012 UP_{98}	—	October 18, 2012	Haleakala	Pan-STARRS 1	VER	2.1 km	MPC · JPL
764145	2012 UR_{98}	—	October 18, 2012	Haleakala	Pan-STARRS 1	·	1.4 km	MPC · JPL
764146	2012 UN_{99}	—	October 18, 2012	Haleakala	Pan-STARRS 1	·	790 m	MPC · JPL
764147	2012 UV_{103}	—	April 23, 2011	Haleakala	Pan-STARRS 1	NYS	1.1 km	MPC · JPL
764148	2012 UB_{104}	—	October 18, 2012	Haleakala	Pan-STARRS 1	·	2.5 km	MPC · JPL
764149	2012 UG_{105}	—	December 15, 2007	Mount Lemmon	Mount Lemmon Survey	·	2.2 km	MPC · JPL
764150	2012 UY_{105}	—	September 21, 2012	Mount Lemmon	Mount Lemmon Survey	·	2.1 km	MPC · JPL
764151	2012 UF_{108}	—	October 13, 2012	Kitt Peak	Spacewatch	·	2.5 km	MPC · JPL
764152	2012 UG_{114}	—	October 11, 2012	Haleakala	Pan-STARRS 1	·	2.3 km	MPC · JPL
764153	2012 UJ_{118}	—	October 22, 2012	Mount Lemmon	Mount Lemmon Survey	·	1.5 km	MPC · JPL
764154	2012 UF_{123}	—	October 8, 2012	Kitt Peak	Spacewatch	·	2.5 km	MPC · JPL
764155	2012 UV_{128}	—	September 26, 2006	Kitt Peak	Spacewatch	·	2.5 km	MPC · JPL
764156	2012 UJ_{129}	—	October 19, 2012	Mount Lemmon	Mount Lemmon Survey	·	2.5 km	MPC · JPL
764157	2012 UZ_{133}	—	September 21, 2012	Mount Lemmon	Mount Lemmon Survey	EUP	2.1 km	MPC · JPL
764158	2012 UB_{143}	—	October 18, 2012	Haleakala	Pan-STARRS 1	·	890 m	MPC · JPL
764159	2012 UD_{143}	—	September 4, 2008	Kitt Peak	Spacewatch	·	880 m	MPC · JPL
764160	2012 UJ_{143}	—	October 8, 2012	Haleakala	Pan-STARRS 1	·	940 m	MPC · JPL
764161	2012 UL_{157}	—	October 23, 2012	Haleakala	Pan-STARRS 1	·	2.2 km	MPC · JPL
764162	2012 UN_{157}	—	October 23, 2012	Haleakala	Pan-STARRS 1	·	2.3 km	MPC · JPL
764163	2012 UL_{163}	—	August 28, 2005	Kitt Peak	Spacewatch	·	410 m	MPC · JPL
764164	2012 UA_{170}	—	October 16, 2012	Catalina	CSS	·	2.3 km	MPC · JPL
764165	2012 UH_{175}	—	October 20, 2012	Mount Lemmon	Mount Lemmon Survey	·	2.7 km	MPC · JPL
764166	2012 UT_{175}	—	October 19, 2012	La Silla	La Silla	THM	1.7 km	MPC · JPL
764167	2012 UF_{178}	—	October 21, 2012	Haleakala	Pan-STARRS 1	3:2 · SHU	3.5 km	MPC · JPL
764168	2012 UL_{180}	—	September 4, 2007	Mount Lemmon	Mount Lemmon Survey	·	1.1 km	MPC · JPL
764169	2012 UR_{182}	—	October 21, 2012	Haleakala	Pan-STARRS 1	·	1.3 km	MPC · JPL
764170	2012 UO_{185}	—	October 19, 2012	Mount Lemmon	Mount Lemmon Survey	·	2.9 km	MPC · JPL
764171	2012 UA_{186}	—	June 8, 2016	Haleakala	Pan-STARRS 1	·	2.9 km	MPC · JPL
764172	2012 UD_{188}	—	October 16, 2012	Mount Lemmon	Mount Lemmon Survey	·	2.5 km	MPC · JPL
764173	2012 UD_{189}	—	October 20, 2012	Mount Lemmon	Mount Lemmon Survey	·	2.0 km	MPC · JPL
764174	2012 UL_{189}	—	October 17, 2012	Haleakala	Pan-STARRS 1	·	1.4 km	MPC · JPL
764175	2012 UY_{189}	—	March 21, 2015	Haleakala	Pan-STARRS 1	·	2.6 km	MPC · JPL
764176	2012 UG_{190}	—	April 1, 2011	Kitt Peak	Spacewatch	·	2.4 km	MPC · JPL
764177	2012 UZ_{192}	—	October 23, 2012	Catalina	CSS	·	3.0 km	MPC · JPL
764178	2012 UR_{194}	—	October 16, 2012	Kitt Peak	Spacewatch	·	2.8 km	MPC · JPL
764179	2012 UN_{199}	—	October 16, 2012	Kitt Peak	Spacewatch	3:2	3.2 km	MPC · JPL
764180	2012 UP_{201}	—	October 6, 2012	Kitt Peak	Spacewatch	·	2.3 km	MPC · JPL
764181	2012 UZ_{203}	—	October 18, 2012	Haleakala	Pan-STARRS 1	·	2.5 km	MPC · JPL
764182	2012 UM_{204}	—	October 11, 2006	Kitt Peak	Spacewatch	HYG	2.1 km	MPC · JPL
764183	2012 UN_{204}	—	October 18, 2012	Haleakala	Pan-STARRS 1	VER	1.9 km	MPC · JPL
764184	2012 UW_{204}	—	October 18, 2012	Haleakala	Pan-STARRS 1	·	2.7 km	MPC · JPL
764185	2012 UO_{205}	—	October 18, 2012	Haleakala	Pan-STARRS 1	ELF	2.9 km	MPC · JPL
764186	2012 UF_{206}	—	July 27, 2017	Haleakala	Pan-STARRS 1	EOS	1.5 km	MPC · JPL
764187	2012 UW_{207}	—	October 23, 2012	Piszkés-tető	K. Sárneczky, A. Király	·	2.4 km	MPC · JPL
764188	2012 UB_{208}	—	October 17, 2012	Haleakala	Pan-STARRS 1	L5	7.0 km	MPC · JPL
764189	2012 UM_{208}	—	June 29, 2015	Haleakala	Pan-STARRS 1	V	520 m	MPC · JPL
764190	2012 UR_{208}	—	February 20, 2015	Haleakala	Pan-STARRS 1	·	2.0 km	MPC · JPL
764191	2012 UP_{209}	—	October 17, 2012	Mount Lemmon	Mount Lemmon Survey	·	2.0 km	MPC · JPL
764192	2012 UR_{209}	—	October 17, 2012	Mount Lemmon	Mount Lemmon Survey	·	2.2 km	MPC · JPL
764193	2012 UH_{210}	—	October 17, 2012	Haleakala	Pan-STARRS 1	·	2.5 km	MPC · JPL
764194	2012 UW_{210}	—	October 20, 2012	Piszkés-tető	K. Sárneczky, A. Király	·	1.3 km	MPC · JPL
764195	2012 US_{211}	—	October 17, 2012	Mount Lemmon	Mount Lemmon Survey	·	2.2 km	MPC · JPL
764196	2012 UN_{212}	—	September 5, 2000	Apache Point	SDSS	·	2.5 km	MPC · JPL
764197	2012 UA_{213}	—	October 17, 2012	Haleakala	Pan-STARRS 1	·	1.2 km	MPC · JPL
764198	2012 UC_{213}	—	October 16, 2012	Mount Lemmon	Mount Lemmon Survey	·	2.4 km	MPC · JPL
764199	2012 UM_{213}	—	October 23, 2012	Mount Lemmon	Mount Lemmon Survey	·	2.5 km	MPC · JPL
764200	2012 UR_{214}	—	October 20, 2012	Kitt Peak	Spacewatch	·	2.1 km	MPC · JPL

== 764201–764300 ==
back to top

Designation			Discovery			Properties		Ref
Permanent	Provisional	Named after	Date	Site	Discoverer(s)	Category	Diam.	Ref
764201	2012 UY_{214}	—	October 20, 2012	Mount Lemmon	Mount Lemmon Survey	·	2.7 km	MPC · JPL
764202	2012 UZ_{214}	—	October 20, 2012	Kitt Peak	Spacewatch	EOS	1.2 km	MPC · JPL
764203	2012 UL_{215}	—	October 16, 2012	Mount Lemmon	Mount Lemmon Survey	PHO	730 m	MPC · JPL
764204	2012 UV_{217}	—	October 23, 2012	Haleakala	Pan-STARRS 1	·	1.4 km	MPC · JPL
764205	2012 UJ_{220}	—	October 18, 2012	Haleakala	Pan-STARRS 1	·	2.0 km	MPC · JPL
764206	2012 UK_{220}	—	October 20, 2012	Haleakala	Pan-STARRS 1	·	2.3 km	MPC · JPL
764207	2012 UL_{220}	—	October 20, 2012	Haleakala	Pan-STARRS 1	·	2.3 km	MPC · JPL
764208	2012 UN_{220}	—	October 16, 2012	Mount Lemmon	Mount Lemmon Survey	·	1.8 km	MPC · JPL
764209	2012 UZ_{220}	—	October 22, 2012	Mount Lemmon	Mount Lemmon Survey	·	790 m	MPC · JPL
764210	2012 UR_{221}	—	October 22, 2012	Mount Lemmon	Mount Lemmon Survey	·	2.1 km	MPC · JPL
764211	2012 UF_{223}	—	October 17, 2012	Mount Lemmon	Mount Lemmon Survey	·	2.3 km	MPC · JPL
764212	2012 UR_{223}	—	October 23, 2012	Haleakala	Pan-STARRS 1	·	2.3 km	MPC · JPL
764213	2012 UG_{224}	—	October 20, 2012	Haleakala	Pan-STARRS 1	·	1.1 km	MPC · JPL
764214	2012 UG_{225}	—	October 17, 2012	Haleakala	Pan-STARRS 1	·	960 m	MPC · JPL
764215	2012 UE_{226}	—	October 22, 2012	Haleakala	Pan-STARRS 1	·	2.6 km	MPC · JPL
764216	2012 UB_{227}	—	October 21, 2012	Haleakala	Pan-STARRS 1	·	850 m	MPC · JPL
764217	2012 UN_{227}	—	October 17, 2012	Haleakala	Pan-STARRS 1	·	2.9 km	MPC · JPL
764218	2012 US_{227}	—	October 18, 2012	Haleakala	Pan-STARRS 1	URS	2.3 km	MPC · JPL
764219	2012 UX_{227}	—	October 18, 2012	Haleakala	Pan-STARRS 1	·	1.8 km	MPC · JPL
764220	2012 UK_{228}	—	April 9, 2010	Kitt Peak	Spacewatch	THM	2.1 km	MPC · JPL
764221	2012 UM_{228}	—	October 16, 2012	Mount Lemmon	Mount Lemmon Survey	·	2.1 km	MPC · JPL
764222	2012 UV_{228}	—	October 25, 2012	Kitt Peak	Spacewatch	·	1.7 km	MPC · JPL
764223	2012 UG_{229}	—	October 18, 2012	Haleakala	Pan-STARRS 1	·	2.4 km	MPC · JPL
764224	2012 UM_{229}	—	October 20, 2012	Haleakala	Pan-STARRS 1	·	2.0 km	MPC · JPL
764225	2012 US_{229}	—	October 23, 2012	Mount Lemmon	Mount Lemmon Survey	·	2.4 km	MPC · JPL
764226	2012 UU_{229}	—	October 18, 2012	Haleakala	Pan-STARRS 1	·	2.0 km	MPC · JPL
764227	2012 UC_{230}	—	October 22, 2012	Haleakala	Pan-STARRS 1	·	2.2 km	MPC · JPL
764228	2012 UB_{231}	—	October 20, 2012	Haleakala	Pan-STARRS 1	·	1.1 km	MPC · JPL
764229	2012 UO_{231}	—	October 22, 2012	Haleakala	Pan-STARRS 1	·	2.2 km	MPC · JPL
764230	2012 UJ_{232}	—	October 23, 2012	Kitt Peak	Spacewatch	·	1.3 km	MPC · JPL
764231	2012 UP_{232}	—	October 18, 2012	Haleakala	Pan-STARRS 1	·	2.2 km	MPC · JPL
764232	2012 UQ_{233}	—	October 18, 2012	Haleakala	Pan-STARRS 1	EOS	1.3 km	MPC · JPL
764233	2012 UU_{233}	—	October 23, 2012	Haleakala	Pan-STARRS 1	·	2.8 km	MPC · JPL
764234	2012 UY_{233}	—	October 16, 2012	Mount Lemmon	Mount Lemmon Survey	EUP	2.8 km	MPC · JPL
764235	2012 UE_{234}	—	October 16, 2012	Mount Lemmon	Mount Lemmon Survey	·	2.4 km	MPC · JPL
764236	2012 UK_{236}	—	October 21, 2012	Kitt Peak	Spacewatch	·	2.5 km	MPC · JPL
764237	2012 UH_{238}	—	October 16, 2012	Mount Lemmon	Mount Lemmon Survey	EOS	1.5 km	MPC · JPL
764238	2012 UC_{240}	—	October 18, 2012	Haleakala	Pan-STARRS 1	THB	2.8 km	MPC · JPL
764239	2012 UC_{248}	—	October 20, 2012	Piszkés-tető	K. Sárneczky, A. Király	·	2.2 km	MPC · JPL
764240	2012 UL_{248}	—	October 18, 2012	Mount Lemmon	Mount Lemmon Survey	·	2.3 km	MPC · JPL
764241	2012 UW_{252}	—	October 20, 2012	Mount Lemmon	Mount Lemmon Survey	L4	6.4 km	MPC · JPL
764242	2012 UX_{253}	—	October 20, 2012	Mount Lemmon	Mount Lemmon Survey	·	2.4 km	MPC · JPL
764243	2012 VH_{1}	—	November 2, 2012	Haleakala	Pan-STARRS 1	·	2.5 km	MPC · JPL
764244	2012 VE_{8}	—	September 20, 2001	Kitt Peak	Spacewatch	THM	1.4 km	MPC · JPL
764245	2012 VR_{11}	—	October 18, 2012	Haleakala	Pan-STARRS 1	·	1.4 km	MPC · JPL
764246	2012 VS_{11}	—	November 4, 2012	Mount Lemmon	Mount Lemmon Survey	HYG	2.0 km	MPC · JPL
764247	2012 VO_{12}	—	September 23, 2012	Mount Lemmon	Mount Lemmon Survey	·	1.9 km	MPC · JPL
764248	2012 VU_{12}	—	October 18, 2012	Haleakala	Pan-STARRS 1	·	2.1 km	MPC · JPL
764249	2012 VO_{13}	—	March 12, 2007	Kitt Peak	Spacewatch	·	1.1 km	MPC · JPL
764250	2012 VS_{15}	—	October 8, 2012	Kitt Peak	Spacewatch	·	1.3 km	MPC · JPL
764251	2012 VY_{23}	—	May 1, 2003	Kitt Peak	Spacewatch	·	920 m	MPC · JPL
764252	2012 VO_{27}	—	October 16, 2012	Catalina	CSS	·	2.7 km	MPC · JPL
764253	2012 VM_{29}	—	October 26, 2012	Kitt Peak	Spacewatch	·	1.6 km	MPC · JPL
764254	2012 VC_{34}	—	October 21, 2012	Mount Lemmon	Mount Lemmon Survey	·	1.4 km	MPC · JPL
764255	2012 VQ_{34}	—	September 28, 2006	Kitt Peak	Spacewatch	·	2.3 km	MPC · JPL
764256	2012 VR_{45}	—	October 14, 2012	Catalina	CSS	·	2.3 km	MPC · JPL
764257	2012 VZ_{49}	—	October 8, 2012	Haleakala	Pan-STARRS 1	·	2.2 km	MPC · JPL
764258	2012 VB_{55}	—	October 2, 2006	Mount Lemmon	Mount Lemmon Survey	·	2.6 km	MPC · JPL
764259	2012 VX_{59}	—	October 7, 2004	Kitt Peak	Spacewatch	3:2 · SHU	3.5 km	MPC · JPL
764260	2012 VB_{64}	—	November 12, 2012	Mount Lemmon	Mount Lemmon Survey	·	2.0 km	MPC · JPL
764261	2012 VA_{68}	—	October 20, 2012	Kitt Peak	Spacewatch	·	2.2 km	MPC · JPL
764262	2012 VT_{68}	—	October 21, 2012	Haleakala	Pan-STARRS 1	EOS	1.4 km	MPC · JPL
764263	2012 VV_{69}	—	October 21, 2012	Haleakala	Pan-STARRS 1	PHO	780 m	MPC · JPL
764264	2012 VW_{69}	—	November 7, 2012	Haleakala	Pan-STARRS 1	EOS	1.4 km	MPC · JPL
764265	2012 VJ_{72}	—	October 12, 2012	Oukaïmeden	C. Rinner	·	1.2 km	MPC · JPL
764266	2012 VW_{83}	—	November 14, 2012	Kitt Peak	Spacewatch	·	2.6 km	MPC · JPL
764267	2012 VK_{87}	—	October 2, 2006	Mount Lemmon	Mount Lemmon Survey	·	2.3 km	MPC · JPL
764268	2012 VT_{112}	—	October 11, 2012	Haleakala	Pan-STARRS 1	·	2.3 km	MPC · JPL
764269	2012 VW_{112}	—	November 12, 2012	Mount Lemmon	Mount Lemmon Survey	·	2.3 km	MPC · JPL
764270	2012 VD_{115}	—	October 31, 2008	Kitt Peak	Spacewatch	·	950 m	MPC · JPL
764271	2012 VR_{116}	—	January 1, 2014	Haleakala	Pan-STARRS 1	·	1 km	MPC · JPL
764272	2012 VX_{116}	—	November 14, 2012	Mount Lemmon	Mount Lemmon Survey	·	1.3 km	MPC · JPL
764273	2012 VT_{117}	—	November 7, 2012	Mount Lemmon	Mount Lemmon Survey	KON	1.8 km	MPC · JPL
764274	2012 VA_{119}	—	February 17, 2015	Haleakala	Pan-STARRS 1	URS	2.8 km	MPC · JPL
764275	2012 VT_{121}	—	November 5, 2012	Kitt Peak	Spacewatch	·	2.2 km	MPC · JPL
764276	2012 VV_{121}	—	July 26, 2017	Haleakala	Pan-STARRS 1	·	2.7 km	MPC · JPL
764277	2012 VF_{124}	—	January 28, 2015	Haleakala	Pan-STARRS 1	·	2.6 km	MPC · JPL
764278	2012 VL_{124}	—	November 4, 2012	Mount Lemmon	Mount Lemmon Survey	WIT	700 m	MPC · JPL
764279	2012 VT_{124}	—	August 15, 2017	Haleakala	Pan-STARRS 1	VER	2.1 km	MPC · JPL
764280	2012 VL_{127}	—	November 13, 2012	Mount Lemmon	Mount Lemmon Survey	·	1.3 km	MPC · JPL
764281	2012 VO_{127}	—	November 14, 2012	Mount Lemmon	Mount Lemmon Survey	·	2.8 km	MPC · JPL
764282	2012 VX_{129}	—	November 13, 2012	Mount Lemmon	Mount Lemmon Survey	·	1.3 km	MPC · JPL
764283	2012 VO_{131}	—	November 12, 2012	Mount Lemmon	Mount Lemmon Survey	·	2.9 km	MPC · JPL
764284	2012 VK_{133}	—	November 5, 2012	Haleakala	Pan-STARRS 1	EOS	1.4 km	MPC · JPL
764285	2012 VS_{133}	—	November 12, 2012	Mount Lemmon	Mount Lemmon Survey	·	2.4 km	MPC · JPL
764286	2012 VT_{133}	—	November 12, 2012	Mount Lemmon	Mount Lemmon Survey	KOR	1.1 km	MPC · JPL
764287	2012 VV_{133}	—	November 7, 2012	Mount Lemmon	Mount Lemmon Survey	·	3.3 km	MPC · JPL
764288	2012 VZ_{135}	—	November 7, 2012	Haleakala	Pan-STARRS 1	(5)	760 m	MPC · JPL
764289	2012 VQ_{136}	—	October 5, 2012	Mount Lemmon	Mount Lemmon Survey	·	2.6 km	MPC · JPL
764290	2012 VR_{141}	—	November 12, 2012	Mount Lemmon	Mount Lemmon Survey	·	3.0 km	MPC · JPL
764291	2012 VF_{145}	—	November 7, 2012	Kitt Peak	Spacewatch	·	2.2 km	MPC · JPL
764292	2012 WH_{5}	—	October 26, 2012	Mount Lemmon	Mount Lemmon Survey	T_{j} (2.99)	2.8 km	MPC · JPL
764293	2012 WS_{16}	—	December 5, 2007	Mount Lemmon	Mount Lemmon Survey	·	1.5 km	MPC · JPL
764294	2012 WS_{21}	—	October 19, 2012	Mount Lemmon	Mount Lemmon Survey	URS	2.4 km	MPC · JPL
764295	2012 WR_{30}	—	November 17, 2012	Mount Lemmon	Mount Lemmon Survey	·	2.4 km	MPC · JPL
764296	2012 WW_{30}	—	April 9, 2010	Kitt Peak	Spacewatch	·	2.6 km	MPC · JPL
764297	2012 WV_{34}	—	November 14, 2012	Kitt Peak	Spacewatch	·	2.8 km	MPC · JPL
764298	2012 WB_{38}	—	November 22, 2012	Kitt Peak	Spacewatch	·	2.5 km	MPC · JPL
764299	2012 WL_{40}	—	January 21, 2015	Haleakala	Pan-STARRS 1	·	2.1 km	MPC · JPL
764300	2012 WZ_{40}	—	November 26, 2012	Mount Lemmon	Mount Lemmon Survey	·	2.5 km	MPC · JPL

== 764301–764400 ==
back to top

Designation			Discovery			Properties		Ref
Permanent	Provisional	Named after	Date	Site	Discoverer(s)	Category	Diam.	Ref
764301	2012 WC_{42}	—	November 20, 2012	Mount Lemmon	Mount Lemmon Survey	KON	1.7 km	MPC · JPL
764302	2012 WP_{43}	—	November 20, 2012	Mount Lemmon	Mount Lemmon Survey	EOS	1.3 km	MPC · JPL
764303	2012 WK_{44}	—	November 18, 2012	Westfield	International Astronomical Search Collaboration	·	2.6 km	MPC · JPL
764304	2012 WA_{45}	—	November 20, 2012	Mount Lemmon	Mount Lemmon Survey	·	1.7 km	MPC · JPL
764305	2012 XL	—	October 23, 2012	Haleakala	Pan-STARRS 1	·	2.3 km	MPC · JPL
764306	2012 XM_{4}	—	November 19, 2012	Kitt Peak	Spacewatch	·	2.3 km	MPC · JPL
764307	2012 XH_{6}	—	November 14, 2012	Mount Lemmon	Mount Lemmon Survey	·	1.4 km	MPC · JPL
764308	2012 XK_{11}	—	October 13, 2012	Kitt Peak	Spacewatch	·	2.9 km	MPC · JPL
764309	2012 XC_{12}	—	October 22, 2012	Haleakala	Pan-STARRS 1	T_{j} (2.97)	3.2 km	MPC · JPL
764310	2012 XB_{21}	—	November 22, 2012	Kitt Peak	Spacewatch	·	1.6 km	MPC · JPL
764311	2012 XM_{31}	—	November 6, 2012	Mount Lemmon	Mount Lemmon Survey	·	540 m	MPC · JPL
764312	2012 XT_{49}	—	October 23, 2012	Mount Lemmon	Mount Lemmon Survey	PHO	910 m	MPC · JPL
764313	2012 XN_{51}	—	December 6, 2012	Mount Lemmon	Mount Lemmon Survey	·	2.4 km	MPC · JPL
764314	2012 XJ_{54}	—	November 20, 2012	Mount Lemmon	Mount Lemmon Survey	·	1.8 km	MPC · JPL
764315	2012 XQ_{56}	—	October 22, 2012	Haleakala	Pan-STARRS 1	·	2.3 km	MPC · JPL
764316	2012 XE_{60}	—	October 21, 2012	Haleakala	Pan-STARRS 1	PHO	840 m	MPC · JPL
764317	2012 XB_{65}	—	December 4, 2012	Mount Lemmon	Mount Lemmon Survey	URS	2.4 km	MPC · JPL
764318	2012 XB_{73}	—	September 23, 2008	Kitt Peak	Spacewatch	·	900 m	MPC · JPL
764319	2012 XE_{73}	—	November 12, 2012	Haleakala	Pan-STARRS 1	·	1.5 km	MPC · JPL
764320	2012 XR_{76}	—	November 14, 2012	Kitt Peak	Spacewatch	·	2.4 km	MPC · JPL
764321	2012 XY_{78}	—	December 6, 2012	Mount Lemmon	Mount Lemmon Survey	·	2.1 km	MPC · JPL
764322	2012 XX_{86}	—	July 28, 2011	Haleakala	Pan-STARRS 1	·	1.7 km	MPC · JPL
764323	2012 XA_{87}	—	October 10, 2012	Mount Lemmon	Mount Lemmon Survey	·	2.0 km	MPC · JPL
764324	2012 XF_{91}	—	November 14, 2012	Kitt Peak	Spacewatch	·	1.6 km	MPC · JPL
764325	2012 XP_{91}	—	December 8, 2012	Mount Lemmon	Mount Lemmon Survey	ADE	1.5 km	MPC · JPL
764326	2012 XV_{94}	—	November 26, 2012	Mount Lemmon	Mount Lemmon Survey	T_{j} (2.98) · EUP	2.8 km	MPC · JPL
764327	2012 XS_{95}	—	December 4, 2012	Mount Lemmon	Mount Lemmon Survey	DOR	2.1 km	MPC · JPL
764328	2012 XP_{98}	—	December 5, 2012	Mount Lemmon	Mount Lemmon Survey	·	2.5 km	MPC · JPL
764329	2012 XR_{100}	—	December 5, 2012	Mount Lemmon	Mount Lemmon Survey	·	870 m	MPC · JPL
764330	2012 XJ_{101}	—	December 5, 2012	Mount Lemmon	Mount Lemmon Survey	URS	2.7 km	MPC · JPL
764331	2012 XV_{110}	—	December 10, 2012	Mount Lemmon	Mount Lemmon Survey	·	920 m	MPC · JPL
764332	2012 XH_{115}	—	July 29, 2008	Kitt Peak	Spacewatch	·	810 m	MPC · JPL
764333	2012 XO_{120}	—	November 6, 2012	Kitt Peak	Spacewatch	JUN	720 m	MPC · JPL
764334	2012 XT_{121}	—	September 26, 2008	Kitt Peak	Spacewatch	·	1.1 km	MPC · JPL
764335	2012 XS_{129}	—	December 5, 2012	Mount Lemmon	Mount Lemmon Survey	·	1.3 km	MPC · JPL
764336	2012 XF_{135}	—	October 21, 2012	Mount Lemmon	Mount Lemmon Survey	LUT	3.4 km	MPC · JPL
764337	2012 XU_{144}	—	December 13, 1999	Socorro	LINEAR	·	570 m	MPC · JPL
764338	2012 XM_{151}	—	December 8, 2012	Mount Lemmon	Mount Lemmon Survey	T_{j} (2.99) · EUP	2.6 km	MPC · JPL
764339	2012 XB_{157}	—	December 8, 2012	Mount Lemmon	Mount Lemmon Survey	KOR	960 m	MPC · JPL
764340	2012 XN_{158}	—	July 31, 2011	Haleakala	Pan-STARRS 1	T_{j} (2.97)	3.7 km	MPC · JPL
764341	2012 XD_{161}	—	February 22, 2014	Mount Lemmon	Mount Lemmon Survey	·	1.2 km	MPC · JPL
764342	2012 XP_{161}	—	December 4, 2012	Mount Lemmon	Mount Lemmon Survey	·	1.1 km	MPC · JPL
764343	2012 XY_{161}	—	December 11, 2012	Mount Lemmon	Mount Lemmon Survey	·	1.1 km	MPC · JPL
764344	2012 XT_{162}	—	September 1, 2017	Haleakala	Pan-STARRS 1	·	3.1 km	MPC · JPL
764345	2012 XU_{165}	—	December 4, 2012	Mount Lemmon	Mount Lemmon Survey	T_{j} (2.94)	2.7 km	MPC · JPL
764346	2012 XV_{167}	—	December 6, 2012	Mount Lemmon	Mount Lemmon Survey	·	900 m	MPC · JPL
764347	2012 XM_{168}	—	January 5, 2013	Mount Lemmon	Mount Lemmon Survey	L4	7.0 km	MPC · JPL
764348	2012 XU_{168}	—	December 12, 2012	Mount Lemmon	Mount Lemmon Survey	·	1.5 km	MPC · JPL
764349	2012 XR_{170}	—	December 8, 2012	Mount Lemmon	Mount Lemmon Survey	·	3.0 km	MPC · JPL
764350	2012 XZ_{171}	—	December 8, 2012	Mount Lemmon	Mount Lemmon Survey	TIR	2.2 km	MPC · JPL
764351	2012 XF_{174}	—	December 13, 2012	Kitt Peak	Spacewatch	·	840 m	MPC · JPL
764352	2012 XM_{174}	—	December 11, 2012	Mount Lemmon	Mount Lemmon Survey	T_{j} (2.93)	3.3 km	MPC · JPL
764353	2012 XG_{177}	—	December 8, 2012	Kitt Peak	Spacewatch	EOS	1.4 km	MPC · JPL
764354	2012 YN_{4}	—	December 21, 2012	Mount Lemmon	Mount Lemmon Survey	·	1.3 km	MPC · JPL
764355	2012 YB_{12}	—	December 21, 2012	Mount Lemmon	Mount Lemmon Survey	·	1.6 km	MPC · JPL
764356	2012 YN_{13}	—	December 23, 2012	Haleakala	Pan-STARRS 1	L4	6.6 km	MPC · JPL
764357	2012 YH_{15}	—	June 5, 2016	Haleakala	Pan-STARRS 1	·	3.1 km	MPC · JPL
764358	2012 YP_{15}	—	December 23, 2012	Haleakala	Pan-STARRS 1	·	2.5 km	MPC · JPL
764359	2012 YV_{15}	—	December 23, 2012	Haleakala	Pan-STARRS 1	·	1.2 km	MPC · JPL
764360	2012 YZ_{15}	—	March 28, 2015	Haleakala	Pan-STARRS 1	·	2.1 km	MPC · JPL
764361	2012 YK_{16}	—	December 22, 2012	Haleakala	Pan-STARRS 1	L4	8.0 km	MPC · JPL
764362	2012 YL_{16}	—	December 23, 2012	Haleakala	Pan-STARRS 1	·	2.0 km	MPC · JPL
764363	2012 YP_{16}	—	December 22, 2012	Haleakala	Pan-STARRS 1	·	950 m	MPC · JPL
764364	2012 YJ_{17}	—	December 23, 2012	Haleakala	Pan-STARRS 1	·	2.2 km	MPC · JPL
764365	2012 YN_{17}	—	December 22, 2012	Haleakala	Pan-STARRS 1	·	3.0 km	MPC · JPL
764366	2012 YO_{17}	—	December 23, 2012	Haleakala	Pan-STARRS 1	L4	6.5 km	MPC · JPL
764367	2012 YG_{18}	—	December 23, 2012	Haleakala	Pan-STARRS 1	VER	1.9 km	MPC · JPL
764368	2012 YR_{18}	—	December 23, 2012	Haleakala	Pan-STARRS 1	L4	6.5 km	MPC · JPL
764369	2012 YC_{21}	—	December 23, 2012	Haleakala	Pan-STARRS 1	EUN	880 m	MPC · JPL
764370	2012 YE_{21}	—	December 28, 2012	Haleakala	Pan-STARRS 1	·	1.9 km	MPC · JPL
764371	2012 YM_{23}	—	December 23, 2012	Haleakala	Pan-STARRS 1	L4	6.5 km	MPC · JPL
764372	2012 YQ_{25}	—	December 22, 2012	Haleakala	Pan-STARRS 1	·	970 m	MPC · JPL
764373	2012 YC_{26}	—	December 23, 2012	Haleakala	Pan-STARRS 1	·	2.1 km	MPC · JPL
764374	2012 YO_{27}	—	December 23, 2012	Haleakala	Pan-STARRS 1	EUN	980 m	MPC · JPL
764375	2013 AF	—	December 21, 2012	Haleakala	Pan-STARRS 1	L4	7.0 km	MPC · JPL
764376	2013 AT_{5}	—	January 3, 2013	Mount Lemmon	Mount Lemmon Survey	·	1.7 km	MPC · JPL
764377	2013 AB_{7}	—	October 9, 2007	Mount Lemmon	Mount Lemmon Survey	AEO	820 m	MPC · JPL
764378	2013 AF_{10}	—	January 4, 2013	Mount Lemmon	Mount Lemmon Survey	·	1.4 km	MPC · JPL
764379	2013 AS_{19}	—	January 5, 2013	Mount Lemmon	Mount Lemmon Survey	·	1.4 km	MPC · JPL
764380	2013 AB_{24}	—	October 21, 2006	Mount Lemmon	Mount Lemmon Survey	·	1.8 km	MPC · JPL
764381	2013 AC_{35}	—	January 4, 2013	Kitt Peak	Spacewatch	·	1.8 km	MPC · JPL
764382	2013 AG_{41}	—	January 16, 2009	Mount Lemmon	Mount Lemmon Survey	(194)	900 m	MPC · JPL
764383	2013 AQ_{42}	—	January 5, 2013	Mount Lemmon	Mount Lemmon Survey	·	3.5 km	MPC · JPL
764384	2013 AR_{52}	—	December 22, 2012	Haleakala	Pan-STARRS 1	·	1.2 km	MPC · JPL
764385	2013 AU_{69}	—	December 22, 2012	Haleakala	Pan-STARRS 1	BRG	1.1 km	MPC · JPL
764386	2013 AC_{70}	—	January 9, 2013	Kitt Peak	Spacewatch	L4	7.6 km	MPC · JPL
764387	2013 AZ_{74}	—	January 10, 2013	Mount Lemmon	Mount Lemmon Survey	·	1.4 km	MPC · JPL
764388	2013 AA_{79}	—	October 13, 2010	Mount Lemmon	Mount Lemmon Survey	L4	6.3 km	MPC · JPL
764389	2013 AN_{84}	—	February 10, 2008	Kitt Peak	Spacewatch	·	2.4 km	MPC · JPL
764390	2013 AT_{97}	—	October 23, 2003	Apache Point	SDSS	(5)	960 m	MPC · JPL
764391	2013 AQ_{98}	—	January 6, 2013	Mount Lemmon	Mount Lemmon Survey	·	1.1 km	MPC · JPL
764392	2013 AE_{104}	—	October 11, 2007	Mount Lemmon	Mount Lemmon Survey	·	1.3 km	MPC · JPL
764393	2013 AE_{108}	—	January 10, 2013	Haleakala	Pan-STARRS 1	L4	6.5 km	MPC · JPL
764394	2013 AW_{126}	—	January 3, 2013	Mount Lemmon	Mount Lemmon Survey	EUN	1 km	MPC · JPL
764395	2013 AM_{134}	—	September 27, 2012	Haleakala	Pan-STARRS 1	L4	6.5 km	MPC · JPL
764396	2013 AT_{134}	—	January 6, 2013	Kitt Peak	Spacewatch	L4	6.3 km	MPC · JPL
764397	2013 AN_{135}	—	January 10, 2013	Haleakala	Pan-STARRS 1	L4	6.2 km	MPC · JPL
764398	2013 AJ_{139}	—	January 4, 2013	Cerro Tololo	D. E. Trilling, R. L. Allen	·	980 m	MPC · JPL
764399	2013 AK_{152}	—	January 4, 2013	Cerro Tololo	D. E. Trilling, R. L. Allen	ELF	2.6 km	MPC · JPL
764400	2013 AS_{154}	—	January 4, 2013	Cerro Tololo	D. E. Trilling, R. L. Allen	·	1.1 km	MPC · JPL

== 764401–764500 ==
back to top

Designation			Discovery			Properties		Ref
Permanent	Provisional	Named after	Date	Site	Discoverer(s)	Category	Diam.	Ref
764401	2013 AR_{158}	—	January 4, 2013	Cerro Tololo	D. E. Trilling, R. L. Allen	·	1.9 km	MPC · JPL
764402	2013 AM_{160}	—	March 28, 2008	Mount Lemmon	Mount Lemmon Survey	·	2.3 km	MPC · JPL
764403	2013 AG_{161}	—	January 20, 2013	Mount Lemmon	Mount Lemmon Survey	·	2.2 km	MPC · JPL
764404	2013 AL_{163}	—	January 4, 2013	Cerro Tololo	D. E. Trilling, R. L. Allen	·	1.1 km	MPC · JPL
764405	2013 AW_{163}	—	January 20, 2013	Mount Lemmon	Mount Lemmon Survey	·	990 m	MPC · JPL
764406	2013 AC_{165}	—	January 4, 2013	Cerro Tololo	D. E. Trilling, R. L. Allen	·	1.1 km	MPC · JPL
764407	2013 AM_{172}	—	January 4, 2013	Cerro Tololo	D. E. Trilling, R. L. Allen	·	2.1 km	MPC · JPL
764408	2013 AA_{173}	—	January 4, 2013	Cerro Tololo	D. E. Trilling, R. L. Allen	L4	6.2 km	MPC · JPL
764409	2013 AT_{186}	—	January 9, 2013	Kitt Peak	Spacewatch	MAR	840 m	MPC · JPL
764410	2013 AB_{188}	—	January 10, 2013	Haleakala	Pan-STARRS 1	·	990 m	MPC · JPL
764411	2013 AM_{193}	—	January 10, 2013	Haleakala	Pan-STARRS 1	L4	6.4 km	MPC · JPL
764412	2013 AQ_{193}	—	April 28, 2014	Haleakala	Pan-STARRS 1	URS	2.2 km	MPC · JPL
764413	2013 AR_{193}	—	December 6, 2012	Mount Lemmon	Mount Lemmon Survey	·	2.0 km	MPC · JPL
764414	2013 AT_{193}	—	January 10, 2013	Haleakala	Pan-STARRS 1	·	1.3 km	MPC · JPL
764415	2013 AO_{194}	—	January 13, 2013	Mount Lemmon	Mount Lemmon Survey	L4	6.2 km	MPC · JPL
764416	2013 AL_{195}	—	January 13, 2013	Mount Lemmon	Mount Lemmon Survey	·	1.3 km	MPC · JPL
764417	2013 AR_{195}	—	January 6, 2013	Kitt Peak	Spacewatch	L4	5.6 km	MPC · JPL
764418	2013 AT_{198}	—	January 10, 2013	Haleakala	Pan-STARRS 1	L4	5.9 km	MPC · JPL
764419	2013 AJ_{199}	—	January 10, 2013	Haleakala	Pan-STARRS 1	·	570 m	MPC · JPL
764420	2013 AU_{199}	—	January 5, 2013	Kitt Peak	Spacewatch	·	1.4 km	MPC · JPL
764421	2013 AO_{201}	—	January 7, 2013	Mount Lemmon	Mount Lemmon Survey	·	1.3 km	MPC · JPL
764422	2013 AX_{201}	—	January 10, 2013	Haleakala	Pan-STARRS 1	L4	7.2 km	MPC · JPL
764423	2013 AZ_{201}	—	January 5, 2013	Kitt Peak	Spacewatch	·	1.9 km	MPC · JPL
764424	2013 AD_{204}	—	January 14, 2013	Mount Lemmon	Mount Lemmon Survey	·	2.6 km	MPC · JPL
764425	2013 AX_{204}	—	January 10, 2013	Haleakala	Pan-STARRS 1	L4	5.9 km	MPC · JPL
764426	2013 AW_{205}	—	January 2, 2013	Mount Lemmon	Mount Lemmon Survey	HNS	950 m	MPC · JPL
764427	2013 BM_{5}	—	January 16, 2013	Mount Lemmon	Mount Lemmon Survey	KON	1.7 km	MPC · JPL
764428	2013 BA_{12}	—	September 27, 2011	Mount Lemmon	Mount Lemmon Survey	·	2.0 km	MPC · JPL
764429	2013 BC_{17}	—	January 10, 2013	Haleakala	Pan-STARRS 1	L4	5.8 km	MPC · JPL
764430	2013 BO_{17}	—	January 18, 2013	Haleakala	Pan-STARRS 1	L4	6.0 km	MPC · JPL
764431	2013 BW_{17}	—	December 12, 2012	Mount Lemmon	Mount Lemmon Survey	L4	6.5 km	MPC · JPL
764432	2013 BO_{23}	—	January 17, 2013	Mount Lemmon	Mount Lemmon Survey	·	1.7 km	MPC · JPL
764433	2013 BR_{33}	—	January 17, 2013	Kitt Peak	Spacewatch	·	1.8 km	MPC · JPL
764434	2013 BL_{34}	—	January 5, 2013	Mount Lemmon	Mount Lemmon Survey	(5)	990 m	MPC · JPL
764435	2013 BQ_{34}	—	January 17, 2013	Haleakala	Pan-STARRS 1	·	1.5 km	MPC · JPL
764436	2013 BO_{36}	—	January 5, 2013	Mount Lemmon	Mount Lemmon Survey	EOS	1.4 km	MPC · JPL
764437	2013 BM_{40}	—	January 18, 2013	Mount Lemmon	Mount Lemmon Survey	·	970 m	MPC · JPL
764438	2013 BX_{43}	—	April 11, 2005	Kitt Peak	Spacewatch	·	1.1 km	MPC · JPL
764439	2013 BB_{51}	—	October 12, 2010	Mount Lemmon	Mount Lemmon Survey	L4	6.4 km	MPC · JPL
764440	2013 BQ_{57}	—	January 5, 2013	Mount Lemmon	Mount Lemmon Survey	·	520 m	MPC · JPL
764441	2013 BE_{61}	—	December 21, 2012	Mount Lemmon	Mount Lemmon Survey	EUN	1.0 km	MPC · JPL
764442	2013 BX_{69}	—	January 21, 2013	Mount Lemmon	Mount Lemmon Survey	·	2.6 km	MPC · JPL
764443	2013 BO_{82}	—	April 3, 2016	Haleakala	Pan-STARRS 1	L4 · ERY	5.8 km	MPC · JPL
764444	2013 BD_{83}	—	January 16, 2013	Mount Lemmon	Mount Lemmon Survey	·	1.4 km	MPC · JPL
764445	2013 BA_{85}	—	March 10, 2014	Mount Lemmon	Mount Lemmon Survey	·	2.6 km	MPC · JPL
764446	2013 BP_{85}	—	March 28, 2014	Haleakala	Pan-STARRS 1	·	1.2 km	MPC · JPL
764447	2013 BY_{85}	—	January 19, 2013	Mount Lemmon	Mount Lemmon Survey	·	1.5 km	MPC · JPL
764448	2013 BV_{88}	—	January 20, 2013	Kitt Peak	Spacewatch	·	1.2 km	MPC · JPL
764449	2013 BN_{90}	—	January 18, 2013	Mount Lemmon	Mount Lemmon Survey	L4	6.7 km	MPC · JPL
764450	2013 BO_{90}	—	January 17, 2013	Haleakala	Pan-STARRS 1	L4	7.0 km	MPC · JPL
764451	2013 BP_{90}	—	January 17, 2013	Kitt Peak	Spacewatch	L4	7.2 km	MPC · JPL
764452	2013 BA_{91}	—	January 20, 2013	Mount Lemmon	Mount Lemmon Survey	·	820 m	MPC · JPL
764453	2013 BF_{91}	—	January 17, 2013	Haleakala	Pan-STARRS 1	L4	6.5 km	MPC · JPL
764454	2013 BR_{91}	—	January 16, 2013	Mount Lemmon	Mount Lemmon Survey	·	1.3 km	MPC · JPL
764455	2013 BO_{92}	—	January 16, 2013	Mount Lemmon	Mount Lemmon Survey	·	2.3 km	MPC · JPL
764456	2013 BV_{92}	—	January 16, 2013	Mount Lemmon	Mount Lemmon Survey	·	1.2 km	MPC · JPL
764457	2013 BR_{94}	—	January 17, 2013	Haleakala	Pan-STARRS 1	·	2.5 km	MPC · JPL
764458	2013 BU_{94}	—	January 17, 2013	Mount Lemmon	Mount Lemmon Survey	(5)	770 m	MPC · JPL
764459	2013 BW_{94}	—	January 22, 2013	Mount Lemmon	Mount Lemmon Survey	·	1.2 km	MPC · JPL
764460	2013 BX_{94}	—	January 17, 2013	Haleakala	Pan-STARRS 1	·	1.1 km	MPC · JPL
764461	2013 BA_{95}	—	January 17, 2013	Haleakala	Pan-STARRS 1	·	890 m	MPC · JPL
764462	2013 BU_{95}	—	January 17, 2013	Haleakala	Pan-STARRS 1	ADE	1.5 km	MPC · JPL
764463	2013 BQ_{97}	—	January 16, 2013	Haleakala	Pan-STARRS 1	(5)	890 m	MPC · JPL
764464	2013 BG_{98}	—	January 18, 2013	Mount Lemmon	Mount Lemmon Survey	·	930 m	MPC · JPL
764465	2013 BJ_{98}	—	January 17, 2013	Mount Lemmon	Mount Lemmon Survey	L4	7.5 km	MPC · JPL
764466	2013 BL_{98}	—	January 18, 2013	Mount Lemmon	Mount Lemmon Survey	L4 · ERY	6.2 km	MPC · JPL
764467	2013 BQ_{100}	—	January 20, 2013	Kitt Peak	Spacewatch	·	2.2 km	MPC · JPL
764468	2013 BO_{101}	—	January 19, 2013	Kitt Peak	Spacewatch	·	2.2 km	MPC · JPL
764469	2013 BX_{101}	—	January 16, 2013	Haleakala	Pan-STARRS 1	L4	6.2 km	MPC · JPL
764470	2013 BC_{102}	—	January 17, 2013	Haleakala	Pan-STARRS 1	L4	5.6 km	MPC · JPL
764471	2013 BJ_{102}	—	January 16, 2013	Mount Lemmon	Mount Lemmon Survey	L4	7.0 km	MPC · JPL
764472	2013 BL_{102}	—	January 18, 2013	Mount Lemmon	Mount Lemmon Survey	L4	5.2 km	MPC · JPL
764473	2013 BP_{103}	—	January 17, 2013	Haleakala	Pan-STARRS 1	·	2.3 km	MPC · JPL
764474	2013 BQ_{103}	—	January 17, 2013	Haleakala	Pan-STARRS 1	·	1.4 km	MPC · JPL
764475	2013 BG_{104}	—	January 17, 2013	Haleakala	Pan-STARRS 1	MAR	730 m	MPC · JPL
764476	2013 BK_{104}	—	March 26, 2009	Mount Lemmon	Mount Lemmon Survey	·	1.4 km	MPC · JPL
764477	2013 BB_{106}	—	January 18, 2013	Haleakala	Pan-STARRS 1	L4	6.9 km	MPC · JPL
764478	2013 BS_{107}	—	January 19, 2013	Mount Lemmon	Mount Lemmon Survey	EOS	1.4 km	MPC · JPL
764479	2013 BM_{108}	—	January 17, 2013	Haleakala	Pan-STARRS 1	·	830 m	MPC · JPL
764480	2013 CM	—	January 17, 2013	Haleakala	Pan-STARRS 1	·	1.4 km	MPC · JPL
764481	2013 CU_{3}	—	January 10, 2013	Haleakala	Pan-STARRS 1	MAR	670 m	MPC · JPL
764482	2013 CN_{7}	—	January 10, 2013	Haleakala	Pan-STARRS 1	·	1.2 km	MPC · JPL
764483	2013 CJ_{12}	—	January 9, 2013	Kitt Peak	Spacewatch	EUN	930 m	MPC · JPL
764484	2013 CZ_{17}	—	February 1, 2013	Kitt Peak	Spacewatch	EUN	920 m	MPC · JPL
764485	2013 CW_{22}	—	February 1, 2013	Haleakala	Pan-STARRS 1	HNS	820 m	MPC · JPL
764486	2013 CT_{23}	—	February 2, 2013	Kitt Peak	Spacewatch	HNS	880 m	MPC · JPL
764487	2013 CG_{26}	—	October 24, 2011	Haleakala	Pan-STARRS 1	·	2.1 km	MPC · JPL
764488	2013 CN_{28}	—	September 24, 2011	Haleakala	Pan-STARRS 1	·	2.2 km	MPC · JPL
764489	2013 CA_{43}	—	February 5, 2013	Mount Lemmon	Mount Lemmon Survey	·	850 m	MPC · JPL
764490	2013 CY_{43}	—	February 5, 2013	Kitt Peak	Spacewatch	L4	5.8 km	MPC · JPL
764491	2013 CL_{47}	—	February 5, 2013	Mount Lemmon	Mount Lemmon Survey	·	2.5 km	MPC · JPL
764492	2013 CH_{60}	—	February 3, 2013	Haleakala	Pan-STARRS 1	·	1.4 km	MPC · JPL
764493	2013 CH_{77}	—	January 18, 2013	Kitt Peak	Spacewatch	·	1.9 km	MPC · JPL
764494	2013 CY_{77}	—	February 3, 2009	Kitt Peak	Spacewatch	·	1.2 km	MPC · JPL
764495	2013 CH_{78}	—	December 17, 2007	Kitt Peak	Spacewatch	·	1.6 km	MPC · JPL
764496	2013 CR_{79}	—	January 10, 2013	Haleakala	Pan-STARRS 1	L4	6.2 km	MPC · JPL
764497	2013 CK_{80}	—	January 17, 2013	Haleakala	Pan-STARRS 1	L4	6.2 km	MPC · JPL
764498	2013 CE_{93}	—	February 8, 2013	Haleakala	Pan-STARRS 1	·	1.1 km	MPC · JPL
764499	2013 CE_{103}	—	September 26, 2011	Haleakala	Pan-STARRS 1	·	1.4 km	MPC · JPL
764500	2013 CP_{105}	—	August 26, 2011	Piszkéstető	K. Sárneczky	·	1.2 km	MPC · JPL

== 764501–764600 ==
back to top

Designation			Discovery			Properties		Ref
Permanent	Provisional	Named after	Date	Site	Discoverer(s)	Category	Diam.	Ref
764501	2013 CG_{110}	—	February 9, 2013	Haleakala	Pan-STARRS 1	·	490 m	MPC · JPL
764502	2013 CU_{112}	—	January 19, 2013	Kitt Peak	Spacewatch	·	1.3 km	MPC · JPL
764503	2013 CC_{114}	—	February 10, 2013	Haleakala	Pan-STARRS 1	·	850 m	MPC · JPL
764504	2013 CX_{114}	—	November 2, 2007	Kitt Peak	Spacewatch	·	1.2 km	MPC · JPL
764505	2013 CR_{133}	—	February 15, 2013	ESA OGS	ESA OGS	·	780 m	MPC · JPL
764506	2013 CA_{135}	—	February 12, 2013	ESA OGS	ESA OGS	·	1.3 km	MPC · JPL
764507	2013 CG_{141}	—	March 2, 2009	Kitt Peak	Spacewatch	·	1.1 km	MPC · JPL
764508	2013 CQ_{141}	—	February 14, 2013	Kitt Peak	Spacewatch	L4	6.3 km	MPC · JPL
764509	2013 CB_{156}	—	March 17, 2009	Kitt Peak	Spacewatch	·	1.2 km	MPC · JPL
764510	2013 CG_{157}	—	January 7, 2006	Mount Lemmon	Mount Lemmon Survey	·	490 m	MPC · JPL
764511	2013 CA_{161}	—	February 14, 2013	Haleakala	Pan-STARRS 1	·	1.6 km	MPC · JPL
764512	2013 CB_{162}	—	February 14, 2013	Haleakala	Pan-STARRS 1	·	2.5 km	MPC · JPL
764513	2013 CQ_{164}	—	February 14, 2013	Haleakala	Pan-STARRS 1	·	540 m	MPC · JPL
764514	2013 CG_{169}	—	March 16, 2009	Kitt Peak	Spacewatch	·	1.2 km	MPC · JPL
764515	2013 CO_{169}	—	October 22, 2003	Apache Point	SDSS	·	760 m	MPC · JPL
764516	2013 CZ_{171}	—	February 7, 2013	Kitt Peak	Spacewatch	·	1.2 km	MPC · JPL
764517	2013 CG_{173}	—	February 15, 2013	Haleakala	Pan-STARRS 1	·	1.5 km	MPC · JPL
764518	2013 CM_{175}	—	February 7, 2013	Kitt Peak	Spacewatch	EUN	840 m	MPC · JPL
764519	2013 CA_{188}	—	January 17, 2013	Mount Lemmon	Mount Lemmon Survey	·	1.7 km	MPC · JPL
764520	2013 CY_{192}	—	February 14, 2013	Mount Lemmon	Mount Lemmon Survey	·	1.1 km	MPC · JPL
764521	2013 CK_{209}	—	February 1, 2013	Kitt Peak	Spacewatch	·	2.3 km	MPC · JPL
764522	2013 CN_{213}	—	March 3, 2009	Mount Lemmon	Mount Lemmon Survey	·	980 m	MPC · JPL
764523	2013 CX_{213}	—	February 8, 2013	Haleakala	Pan-STARRS 1	·	1.3 km	MPC · JPL
764524	2013 CN_{216}	—	January 9, 2013	Mount Lemmon	Mount Lemmon Survey	EUN	920 m	MPC · JPL
764525	2013 CS_{216}	—	February 6, 2013	Mount Lemmon	Mount Lemmon Survey	·	1.3 km	MPC · JPL
764526	2013 CW_{217}	—	February 8, 2013	Haleakala	Pan-STARRS 1	·	1.3 km	MPC · JPL
764527	2013 CG_{218}	—	February 8, 2013	Haleakala	Pan-STARRS 1	·	1.6 km	MPC · JPL
764528	2013 CT_{219}	—	October 23, 2011	Haleakala	Pan-STARRS 1	·	1.3 km	MPC · JPL
764529	2013 CT_{220}	—	December 5, 2010	Mount Lemmon	Mount Lemmon Survey	L4 · ERY	5.8 km	MPC · JPL
764530	2013 CE_{221}	—	February 1, 2013	Kitt Peak	Spacewatch	L4	5.8 km	MPC · JPL
764531	2013 CK_{222}	—	January 18, 2012	Mount Lemmon	Mount Lemmon Survey	L4	6.7 km	MPC · JPL
764532	2013 CJ_{223}	—	February 8, 2013	Haleakala	Pan-STARRS 1	L4	5.2 km	MPC · JPL
764533	2013 CN_{223}	—	February 16, 2015	Haleakala	Pan-STARRS 1	L4	5.8 km	MPC · JPL
764534	2013 CT_{223}	—	January 22, 2015	Haleakala	Pan-STARRS 1	L4	6.6 km	MPC · JPL
764535	2013 CF_{224}	—	April 1, 2009	Mount Lemmon	Mount Lemmon Survey	·	1.1 km	MPC · JPL
764536	2013 CY_{224}	—	November 11, 2007	Mount Lemmon	Mount Lemmon Survey	·	870 m	MPC · JPL
764537	2013 CG_{225}	—	February 1, 2013	Kitt Peak	Spacewatch	·	1.1 km	MPC · JPL
764538	2013 CV_{225}	—	September 28, 2011	Mount Lemmon	Mount Lemmon Survey	·	1.3 km	MPC · JPL
764539	2013 CL_{226}	—	February 8, 2013	Haleakala	Pan-STARRS 1	MAR	830 m	MPC · JPL
764540	2013 CP_{226}	—	October 24, 2011	Haleakala	Pan-STARRS 1	·	1.4 km	MPC · JPL
764541	2013 CG_{228}	—	February 15, 2013	Haleakala	Pan-STARRS 1	·	790 m	MPC · JPL
764542	2013 CH_{231}	—	February 14, 2013	Haleakala	Pan-STARRS 1	HNS	780 m	MPC · JPL
764543	2013 CQ_{232}	—	March 27, 2015	Haleakala	Pan-STARRS 1	L4	6.7 km	MPC · JPL
764544	2013 CO_{233}	—	September 9, 2015	Haleakala	Pan-STARRS 1	·	1.3 km	MPC · JPL
764545	2013 CU_{233}	—	April 29, 2014	Haleakala	Pan-STARRS 1	·	790 m	MPC · JPL
764546	2013 CO_{236}	—	April 10, 2016	Haleakala	Pan-STARRS 1	L4	6.6 km	MPC · JPL
764547	2013 CP_{236}	—	April 5, 2014	Haleakala	Pan-STARRS 1	·	2.8 km	MPC · JPL
764548	2013 CQ_{236}	—	February 3, 2013	Haleakala	Pan-STARRS 1	·	1.1 km	MPC · JPL
764549	2013 CV_{236}	—	March 17, 2018	Haleakala	Pan-STARRS 1	PAD	1.2 km	MPC · JPL
764550	2013 CF_{237}	—	February 3, 2013	Haleakala	Pan-STARRS 1	L4	6.4 km	MPC · JPL
764551	2013 CL_{237}	—	January 31, 2017	Haleakala	Pan-STARRS 1	·	850 m	MPC · JPL
764552	2013 CY_{237}	—	February 7, 2013	Kitt Peak	Spacewatch	·	1.2 km	MPC · JPL
764553	2013 CF_{239}	—	February 3, 2013	Haleakala	Pan-STARRS 1	L4	5.9 km	MPC · JPL
764554	2013 CT_{239}	—	February 5, 2013	Mount Lemmon	Mount Lemmon Survey	L4	5.5 km	MPC · JPL
764555	2013 CX_{242}	—	February 15, 2013	Haleakala	Pan-STARRS 1	·	1.3 km	MPC · JPL
764556	2013 CX_{243}	—	February 14, 2013	Haleakala	Pan-STARRS 1	·	1.3 km	MPC · JPL
764557	2013 CV_{244}	—	February 13, 2013	Haleakala	Pan-STARRS 1	L4	6.4 km	MPC · JPL
764558	2013 CF_{245}	—	February 9, 2013	Haleakala	Pan-STARRS 1	L4	6.1 km	MPC · JPL
764559	2013 CC_{246}	—	February 8, 2013	Haleakala	Pan-STARRS 1	·	1.3 km	MPC · JPL
764560	2013 CK_{246}	—	February 15, 2013	Haleakala	Pan-STARRS 1	·	1.2 km	MPC · JPL
764561	2013 CO_{246}	—	February 1, 2013	Mount Lemmon	Mount Lemmon Survey	·	1.1 km	MPC · JPL
764562	2013 CZ_{246}	—	February 15, 2013	Haleakala	Pan-STARRS 1	·	1.4 km	MPC · JPL
764563	2013 CC_{247}	—	February 15, 2013	Haleakala	Pan-STARRS 1	·	1.2 km	MPC · JPL
764564	2013 CX_{247}	—	February 14, 2013	Kitt Peak	Spacewatch	·	1.2 km	MPC · JPL
764565	2013 CF_{251}	—	February 2, 2013	Mount Lemmon	Mount Lemmon Survey	L4	5.9 km	MPC · JPL
764566	2013 CC_{256}	—	February 15, 2013	Haleakala	Pan-STARRS 1	·	1.4 km	MPC · JPL
764567	2013 CN_{256}	—	February 8, 2013	Haleakala	Pan-STARRS 1	·	1.3 km	MPC · JPL
764568	2013 CK_{257}	—	February 14, 2013	Kitt Peak	Spacewatch	·	1 km	MPC · JPL
764569	2013 CC_{258}	—	February 14, 2013	Haleakala	Pan-STARRS 1	·	1.4 km	MPC · JPL
764570	2013 CG_{259}	—	February 5, 2013	Mount Lemmon	Mount Lemmon Survey	L4	5.7 km	MPC · JPL
764571	2013 CX_{261}	—	February 8, 2013	Haleakala	Pan-STARRS 1	·	1.2 km	MPC · JPL
764572	2013 CH_{264}	—	February 13, 2013	Haleakala	Pan-STARRS 1	·	2.8 km	MPC · JPL
764573	2013 CJ_{268}	—	February 3, 2013	Haleakala	Pan-STARRS 1	3:2	5.3 km	MPC · JPL
764574	2013 CK_{268}	—	February 8, 2013	Haleakala	Pan-STARRS 1	·	1.2 km	MPC · JPL
764575	2013 DG_{4}	—	February 26, 2004	Kitt Peak	Deep Ecliptic Survey	AGN	870 m	MPC · JPL
764576	2013 DM_{11}	—	February 5, 2013	Haleakala	Pan-STARRS 1	·	1.4 km	MPC · JPL
764577	2013 DP_{11}	—	January 30, 2009	Mount Lemmon	Mount Lemmon Survey	EUN	1 km	MPC · JPL
764578	2013 DW_{12}	—	February 9, 2013	Haleakala	Pan-STARRS 1	·	1.4 km	MPC · JPL
764579	2013 DO_{14}	—	September 27, 2011	Mount Lemmon	Mount Lemmon Survey	·	1.4 km	MPC · JPL
764580	2013 DA_{18}	—	February 7, 2013	Kitt Peak	Spacewatch	·	1.4 km	MPC · JPL
764581	2013 DX_{18}	—	February 17, 2013	Kitt Peak	Spacewatch	·	1.2 km	MPC · JPL
764582	2013 DY_{18}	—	April 12, 2018	Mount Lemmon	Mount Lemmon Survey	·	1.6 km	MPC · JPL
764583	2013 DM_{20}	—	February 16, 2013	Kitt Peak	Spacewatch	·	1.2 km	MPC · JPL
764584	2013 DW_{20}	—	February 16, 2013	Mount Lemmon	Mount Lemmon Survey	·	1.5 km	MPC · JPL
764585	2013 DX_{20}	—	March 14, 2004	Kitt Peak	Spacewatch	·	1.3 km	MPC · JPL
764586	2013 DV_{21}	—	February 16, 2013	Mount Lemmon	Mount Lemmon Survey	·	2.2 km	MPC · JPL
764587	2013 DC_{22}	—	February 16, 2013	Mount Lemmon	Mount Lemmon Survey	·	1.4 km	MPC · JPL
764588	2013 DD_{23}	—	February 17, 2013	Kitt Peak	Spacewatch	·	1.4 km	MPC · JPL
764589	2013 EF_{8}	—	March 3, 2013	Mount Lemmon	Mount Lemmon Survey	EUN	820 m	MPC · JPL
764590	2013 EK_{19}	—	August 12, 2010	Kitt Peak	Spacewatch	·	1.5 km	MPC · JPL
764591	2013 EW_{20}	—	February 8, 2013	Haleakala	Pan-STARRS 1	·	2.3 km	MPC · JPL
764592	2013 ET_{24}	—	March 5, 2013	Kitt Peak	Spacewatch	·	1.6 km	MPC · JPL
764593	2013 ED_{25}	—	March 6, 2013	Haleakala	Pan-STARRS 1	·	1.2 km	MPC · JPL
764594	2013 ED_{26}	—	March 28, 2008	Mount Lemmon	Mount Lemmon Survey	·	1.5 km	MPC · JPL
764595	2013 EU_{38}	—	March 8, 2013	Haleakala	Pan-STARRS 1	·	1.6 km	MPC · JPL
764596	2013 EY_{40}	—	March 11, 2013	Mount Lemmon	Mount Lemmon Survey	·	1.2 km	MPC · JPL
764597	2013 EU_{42}	—	March 5, 2013	Mount Lemmon	Mount Lemmon Survey	·	500 m	MPC · JPL
764598	2013 EY_{44}	—	March 6, 2013	Haleakala	Pan-STARRS 1	·	1.1 km	MPC · JPL
764599	2013 ET_{50}	—	March 6, 2013	Haleakala	Pan-STARRS 1	·	1.3 km	MPC · JPL
764600	2013 EV_{51}	—	March 8, 2013	Haleakala	Pan-STARRS 1	·	1.3 km	MPC · JPL

== 764601–764700 ==
back to top

Designation			Discovery			Properties		Ref
Permanent	Provisional	Named after	Date	Site	Discoverer(s)	Category	Diam.	Ref
764601	2013 EZ_{57}	—	March 8, 2013	Haleakala	Pan-STARRS 1	·	1.1 km	MPC · JPL
764602	2013 EZ_{59}	—	March 8, 2013	Haleakala	Pan-STARRS 1	KON	1.4 km	MPC · JPL
764603	2013 EM_{60}	—	March 8, 2013	Haleakala	Pan-STARRS 1	·	550 m	MPC · JPL
764604	2013 EC_{63}	—	March 8, 2013	Haleakala	Pan-STARRS 1	·	1.2 km	MPC · JPL
764605	2013 EK_{68}	—	March 7, 2013	Kitt Peak	Spacewatch	·	1.3 km	MPC · JPL
764606	2013 EX_{69}	—	February 14, 2013	Haleakala	Pan-STARRS 1	·	1.1 km	MPC · JPL
764607	2013 EG_{70}	—	February 14, 2013	Haleakala	Pan-STARRS 1	·	790 m	MPC · JPL
764608	2013 EP_{74}	—	November 29, 2011	Kitt Peak	Spacewatch	·	2.1 km	MPC · JPL
764609	2013 EO_{75}	—	September 7, 2011	Kitt Peak	Spacewatch	·	1.0 km	MPC · JPL
764610	2013 EP_{78}	—	March 8, 2013	Haleakala	Pan-STARRS 1	·	1.4 km	MPC · JPL
764611	2013 ED_{84}	—	March 8, 2013	Haleakala	Pan-STARRS 1	·	1.1 km	MPC · JPL
764612	2013 EN_{93}	—	March 13, 2013	Mount Lemmon	Mount Lemmon Survey	·	1.3 km	MPC · JPL
764613	2013 ER_{98}	—	March 8, 2013	Haleakala	Pan-STARRS 1	·	1.3 km	MPC · JPL
764614	2013 ED_{113}	—	September 10, 2007	Mount Lemmon	Mount Lemmon Survey	(5)	740 m	MPC · JPL
764615	2013 EQ_{129}	—	March 12, 2013	Kitt Peak	Research and Education Collaborative Occultation Network	·	1.0 km	MPC · JPL
764616	2013 ER_{132}	—	February 13, 2008	Kitt Peak	Spacewatch	·	1.4 km	MPC · JPL
764617	2013 ED_{142}	—	March 30, 2008	Kitt Peak	Spacewatch	·	2.3 km	MPC · JPL
764618	2013 EE_{152}	—	November 25, 2011	Haleakala	Pan-STARRS 1	·	1.0 km	MPC · JPL
764619	2013 EL_{154}	—	April 23, 2015	Haleakala	Pan-STARRS 1	L4	5.4 km	MPC · JPL
764620	2013 EP_{156}	—	March 5, 2013	Haleakala	Pan-STARRS 1	·	910 m	MPC · JPL
764621	2013 EQ_{156}	—	March 5, 2013	Haleakala	Pan-STARRS 1	·	1.0 km	MPC · JPL
764622	2013 ES_{156}	—	March 5, 2013	Haleakala	Pan-STARRS 1	·	1.1 km	MPC · JPL
764623	2013 EW_{156}	—	March 5, 2013	Haleakala	Pan-STARRS 1	EUN	850 m	MPC · JPL
764624	2013 EA_{157}	—	March 6, 2013	Haleakala	Pan-STARRS 1	·	1.4 km	MPC · JPL
764625	2013 EK_{158}	—	March 8, 2013	Haleakala	Pan-STARRS 1	·	1.4 km	MPC · JPL
764626	2013 EL_{159}	—	March 15, 2013	Kitt Peak	Spacewatch	·	580 m	MPC · JPL
764627	2013 ET_{159}	—	July 4, 2005	Mount Lemmon	Mount Lemmon Survey	·	1.3 km	MPC · JPL
764628	2013 EU_{159}	—	March 6, 2013	Haleakala	Pan-STARRS 1	(260)	2.7 km	MPC · JPL
764629	2013 EO_{160}	—	March 8, 2013	Haleakala	Pan-STARRS 1	HNS	720 m	MPC · JPL
764630	2013 EN_{163}	—	October 10, 2015	Haleakala	Pan-STARRS 1	·	930 m	MPC · JPL
764631	2013 EX_{163}	—	June 12, 2016	Mount Lemmon	Mount Lemmon Survey	H	340 m	MPC · JPL
764632	2013 EA_{164}	—	March 5, 2013	Haleakala	Pan-STARRS 1	·	1.0 km	MPC · JPL
764633	2013 ED_{164}	—	February 18, 2017	Haleakala	Pan-STARRS 1	EUN	760 m	MPC · JPL
764634	2013 EE_{164}	—	July 25, 2015	Haleakala	Pan-STARRS 1	·	1.2 km	MPC · JPL
764635	2013 ES_{165}	—	October 12, 2015	Mount Lemmon	Mount Lemmon Survey	·	1.9 km	MPC · JPL
764636	2013 EU_{166}	—	February 25, 2014	Mauna Kea	Kotson, M. C., D. J. Tholen	·	2.3 km	MPC · JPL
764637	2013 EO_{167}	—	March 15, 2013	Kitt Peak	Spacewatch	·	1.0 km	MPC · JPL
764638	2013 EW_{167}	—	March 5, 2013	Mount Lemmon	Mount Lemmon Survey	·	500 m	MPC · JPL
764639	2013 EP_{169}	—	April 2, 2000	Kitt Peak	Spacewatch	·	1.2 km	MPC · JPL
764640	2013 EC_{171}	—	March 3, 2013	Kitt Peak	Spacewatch	·	2.9 km	MPC · JPL
764641	2013 EF_{171}	—	March 13, 2013	Kitt Peak	Spacewatch	·	780 m	MPC · JPL
764642	2013 EA_{172}	—	March 8, 2013	Haleakala	Pan-STARRS 1	AST	1.4 km	MPC · JPL
764643	2013 EC_{175}	—	March 5, 2013	Mount Lemmon	Mount Lemmon Survey	·	1.1 km	MPC · JPL
764644	2013 EB_{176}	—	March 16, 2009	Kitt Peak	Spacewatch	·	840 m	MPC · JPL
764645	2013 EF_{176}	—	November 24, 2011	Haleakala	Pan-STARRS 1	EOS	1.4 km	MPC · JPL
764646	2013 EW_{177}	—	March 4, 2013	Haleakala	Pan-STARRS 1	·	1.2 km	MPC · JPL
764647	2013 EH_{178}	—	March 5, 2013	Mount Lemmon	Mount Lemmon Survey	VER	2.1 km	MPC · JPL
764648	2013 EE_{180}	—	March 13, 2013	Haleakala	Pan-STARRS 1	·	810 m	MPC · JPL
764649	2013 EJ_{180}	—	March 5, 2013	Haleakala	Pan-STARRS 1	VER	2.0 km	MPC · JPL
764650	2013 EV_{180}	—	March 5, 2013	Mount Lemmon	Mount Lemmon Survey	EOS	1.4 km	MPC · JPL
764651	2013 EC_{182}	—	November 19, 2011	Mount Lemmon	Mount Lemmon Survey	·	580 m	MPC · JPL
764652	2013 ES_{183}	—	March 14, 2013	Mount Lemmon	Mount Lemmon Survey	GEF	960 m	MPC · JPL
764653	2013 EE_{185}	—	March 5, 2013	Haleakala	Pan-STARRS 1	·	1.3 km	MPC · JPL
764654	2013 FK_{3}	—	March 5, 2013	Haleakala	Pan-STARRS 1	·	1.3 km	MPC · JPL
764655	2013 FG_{9}	—	July 7, 2011	Mount Lemmon	Mount Lemmon Survey	H	420 m	MPC · JPL
764656	2013 FY_{16}	—	March 13, 2013	Kitt Peak	Spacewatch	HNS	870 m	MPC · JPL
764657	2013 FV_{25}	—	March 5, 2013	Haleakala	Pan-STARRS 1	·	1.8 km	MPC · JPL
764658	2013 FD_{29}	—	March 17, 2013	Mount Lemmon	Mount Lemmon Survey	·	1.3 km	MPC · JPL
764659	2013 FF_{29}	—	March 19, 2013	Haleakala	Pan-STARRS 1	·	1.2 km	MPC · JPL
764660	2013 FX_{29}	—	March 19, 2013	Haleakala	Pan-STARRS 1	·	910 m	MPC · JPL
764661	2013 FJ_{31}	—	March 19, 2013	Haleakala	Pan-STARRS 1	HNS	770 m	MPC · JPL
764662	2013 FK_{32}	—	March 18, 2013	Mount Lemmon	Mount Lemmon Survey	V	510 m	MPC · JPL
764663	2013 FG_{33}	—	March 13, 2013	Mount Lemmon	Mount Lemmon Survey	·	1.3 km	MPC · JPL
764664	2013 FH_{34}	—	March 19, 2013	Haleakala	Pan-STARRS 1	(5)	800 m	MPC · JPL
764665	2013 FS_{34}	—	March 31, 2013	Mount Lemmon	Mount Lemmon Survey	·	540 m	MPC · JPL
764666	2013 FJ_{38}	—	March 17, 2013	Mount Lemmon	Mount Lemmon Survey	·	590 m	MPC · JPL
764667	2013 FT_{38}	—	March 19, 2013	Haleakala	Pan-STARRS 1	·	1.3 km	MPC · JPL
764668	2013 FX_{38}	—	March 17, 2013	Mount Lemmon	Mount Lemmon Survey	·	2.8 km	MPC · JPL
764669	2013 GT_{4}	—	April 1, 2013	Mount Lemmon	Mount Lemmon Survey	·	1.1 km	MPC · JPL
764670	2013 GA_{5}	—	March 3, 2009	Kitt Peak	Spacewatch	·	1.0 km	MPC · JPL
764671	2013 GQ_{6}	—	March 19, 2013	Haleakala	Pan-STARRS 1	·	1.2 km	MPC · JPL
764672	2013 GZ_{6}	—	April 22, 2004	Apache Point	SDSS	·	1.4 km	MPC · JPL
764673	2013 GK_{21}	—	January 15, 2007	Mauna Kea	P. A. Wiegert	·	1.2 km	MPC · JPL
764674	2013 GX_{34}	—	April 7, 2013	Mount Lemmon	Mount Lemmon Survey	·	540 m	MPC · JPL
764675	2013 GK_{35}	—	March 22, 2013	Les Engarouines	L. Bernasconi	·	1.5 km	MPC · JPL
764676	2013 GF_{39}	—	January 11, 2008	Mount Lemmon	Mount Lemmon Survey	·	1.4 km	MPC · JPL
764677	2013 GK_{40}	—	September 12, 2007	Kitt Peak	Spacewatch	·	550 m	MPC · JPL
764678	2013 GW_{51}	—	April 10, 2013	Mount Lemmon	Mount Lemmon Survey	·	1.3 km	MPC · JPL
764679	2013 GG_{54}	—	April 6, 1995	Kitt Peak	Spacewatch	·	1.2 km	MPC · JPL
764680	2013 GY_{72}	—	March 13, 2013	Haleakala	Pan-STARRS 1	·	530 m	MPC · JPL
764681	2013 GV_{73}	—	April 12, 2013	Haleakala	Pan-STARRS 1	H	360 m	MPC · JPL
764682	2013 GW_{78}	—	October 21, 2006	Kitt Peak	Spacewatch	·	1.6 km	MPC · JPL
764683	2013 GO_{89}	—	March 11, 2013	Mount Lemmon	Mount Lemmon Survey	·	1.2 km	MPC · JPL
764684	2013 GA_{91}	—	April 16, 2013	Elena Remote	Oreshko, A.	·	1.4 km	MPC · JPL
764685	2013 GJ_{94}	—	March 5, 2013	Haleakala	Pan-STARRS 1	EUN	880 m	MPC · JPL
764686	2013 GM_{103}	—	February 29, 2000	Socorro	LINEAR	·	1.1 km	MPC · JPL
764687	2013 GK_{115}	—	May 30, 2009	Mount Lemmon	Mount Lemmon Survey	·	1.2 km	MPC · JPL
764688	2013 GZ_{116}	—	March 17, 2013	Kitt Peak	Spacewatch	MIS	2.2 km	MPC · JPL
764689	2013 GF_{122}	—	April 10, 2013	Kitt Peak	Spacewatch	·	1.6 km	MPC · JPL
764690	2013 GE_{128}	—	April 3, 2013	Palomar	Palomar Transient Factory	·	1.3 km	MPC · JPL
764691	2013 GT_{132}	—	March 14, 2013	Kitt Peak	Spacewatch	·	1.3 km	MPC · JPL
764692	2013 GK_{133}	—	March 13, 2013	Haleakala	Pan-STARRS 1	·	1.2 km	MPC · JPL
764693	2013 GD_{134}	—	April 7, 2013	Mount Lemmon	Mount Lemmon Survey	·	1.7 km	MPC · JPL
764694	2013 GJ_{139}	—	April 8, 2013	Mount Lemmon	Mount Lemmon Survey	·	1.2 km	MPC · JPL
764695	2013 GL_{139}	—	April 15, 2013	Haleakala	Pan-STARRS 1	·	1.3 km	MPC · JPL
764696	2013 GJ_{140}	—	April 10, 2013	Haleakala	Pan-STARRS 1	·	1.7 km	MPC · JPL
764697	2013 GM_{141}	—	April 15, 2013	Haleakala	Pan-STARRS 1	·	2.0 km	MPC · JPL
764698	2013 GU_{141}	—	April 13, 2013	Haleakala	Pan-STARRS 1	·	610 m	MPC · JPL
764699	2013 GM_{142}	—	April 9, 2013	Haleakala	Pan-STARRS 1	·	570 m	MPC · JPL
764700	2013 GO_{142}	—	September 22, 2014	Kitt Peak	Spacewatch	·	1.4 km	MPC · JPL

== 764701–764800 ==
back to top

Designation			Discovery			Properties		Ref
Permanent	Provisional	Named after	Date	Site	Discoverer(s)	Category	Diam.	Ref
764701	2013 GQ_{142}	—	August 3, 2014	Haleakala	Pan-STARRS 1	EUN	820 m	MPC · JPL
764702	2013 GT_{142}	—	April 10, 2013	Haleakala	Pan-STARRS 1	·	1.1 km	MPC · JPL
764703	2013 GZ_{146}	—	May 24, 2014	Haleakala	Pan-STARRS 1	·	1.8 km	MPC · JPL
764704	2013 GP_{147}	—	April 13, 2013	Haleakala	Pan-STARRS 1	H	290 m	MPC · JPL
764705	2013 GV_{147}	—	March 20, 2017	Haleakala	Pan-STARRS 1	·	990 m	MPC · JPL
764706	2013 GX_{147}	—	April 11, 2013	Mount Lemmon	Mount Lemmon Survey	·	1.3 km	MPC · JPL
764707	2013 GS_{148}	—	October 16, 2015	Kitt Peak	Spacewatch	EUN	940 m	MPC · JPL
764708	2013 GF_{149}	—	April 10, 2013	Haleakala	Pan-STARRS 1	·	1.3 km	MPC · JPL
764709	2013 GL_{149}	—	April 10, 2013	Mount Lemmon	Mount Lemmon Survey	·	1.4 km	MPC · JPL
764710	2013 GO_{149}	—	April 12, 2013	Haleakala	Pan-STARRS 1	·	520 m	MPC · JPL
764711	2013 GQ_{149}	—	January 28, 2017	Haleakala	Pan-STARRS 1	·	1.4 km	MPC · JPL
764712	2013 GW_{149}	—	September 20, 2015	Mount Lemmon	Mount Lemmon Survey	ELF	2.7 km	MPC · JPL
764713	2013 GE_{150}	—	January 26, 2017	Mount Lemmon	Mount Lemmon Survey	·	1.3 km	MPC · JPL
764714	2013 GL_{150}	—	November 3, 2015	Mount Lemmon	Mount Lemmon Survey	·	1.3 km	MPC · JPL
764715	2013 GN_{150}	—	August 20, 2014	Haleakala	Pan-STARRS 1	MRX	770 m	MPC · JPL
764716	2013 GA_{151}	—	April 10, 2013	Siding Spring	SSS	·	1.6 km	MPC · JPL
764717	2013 GB_{151}	—	September 30, 2010	Mount Lemmon	Mount Lemmon Survey	·	1.5 km	MPC · JPL
764718	2013 GO_{154}	—	April 10, 2013	Haleakala	Pan-STARRS 1	·	1.2 km	MPC · JPL
764719	2013 GL_{155}	—	April 12, 2013	Haleakala	Pan-STARRS 1	·	540 m	MPC · JPL
764720	2013 GO_{155}	—	April 12, 2013	Haleakala	Pan-STARRS 1	·	1.5 km	MPC · JPL
764721	2013 HS_{5}	—	April 18, 2013	Mount Lemmon	Mount Lemmon Survey	T_{j} (2.99)	2.3 km	MPC · JPL
764722	2013 HM_{17}	—	March 14, 2013	Kitt Peak	Spacewatch	(5)	1.1 km	MPC · JPL
764723	2013 HT_{17}	—	February 12, 2002	Desert Eagle	W. K. Y. Yeung	·	2.4 km	MPC · JPL
764724	2013 HE_{28}	—	April 17, 2013	Haleakala	Pan-STARRS 1	·	1.2 km	MPC · JPL
764725	2013 HC_{31}	—	April 9, 2013	Haleakala	Pan-STARRS 1	TEL	960 m	MPC · JPL
764726	2013 HN_{34}	—	September 9, 2007	Kitt Peak	Spacewatch	·	460 m	MPC · JPL
764727	2013 HM_{35}	—	January 28, 2000	Kitt Peak	Spacewatch	·	1 km	MPC · JPL
764728	2013 HP_{38}	—	April 16, 2013	Cerro Tololo-DECam	DECam	·	1.3 km	MPC · JPL
764729	2013 HW_{38}	—	April 9, 2013	Haleakala	Pan-STARRS 1	·	1.3 km	MPC · JPL
764730	2013 HW_{39}	—	April 9, 2013	Haleakala	Pan-STARRS 1	PHO	650 m	MPC · JPL
764731	2013 HR_{43}	—	January 27, 2007	Mount Lemmon	Mount Lemmon Survey	·	1.6 km	MPC · JPL
764732	2013 HE_{45}	—	April 16, 2013	Cerro Tololo-DECam	DECam	·	1.5 km	MPC · JPL
764733	2013 HF_{47}	—	September 17, 2006	Kitt Peak	Spacewatch	·	1.3 km	MPC · JPL
764734	2013 HN_{51}	—	April 16, 2013	Cerro Tololo-DECam	DECam	·	1.2 km	MPC · JPL
764735	2013 HJ_{53}	—	January 10, 2008	Kitt Peak	Spacewatch	·	1.1 km	MPC · JPL
764736	2013 HT_{54}	—	November 20, 2006	Kitt Peak	Spacewatch	·	1.2 km	MPC · JPL
764737	2013 HW_{59}	—	April 9, 2013	Haleakala	Pan-STARRS 1	·	1.3 km	MPC · JPL
764738	2013 HB_{61}	—	November 1, 2010	Mount Lemmon	Mount Lemmon Survey	·	1.3 km	MPC · JPL
764739	2013 HS_{61}	—	April 9, 2013	Haleakala	Pan-STARRS 1	·	1.2 km	MPC · JPL
764740	2013 HO_{63}	—	October 2, 2010	Kitt Peak	Spacewatch	·	1.3 km	MPC · JPL
764741	2013 HT_{63}	—	April 9, 2013	Haleakala	Pan-STARRS 1	·	1.6 km	MPC · JPL
764742	2013 HN_{70}	—	October 5, 2005	Mount Lemmon	Mount Lemmon Survey	AGN	830 m	MPC · JPL
764743	2013 HN_{71}	—	February 8, 2008	Kitt Peak	Spacewatch	·	1.2 km	MPC · JPL
764744	2013 HV_{73}	—	April 11, 2008	Mount Lemmon	Mount Lemmon Survey	·	1.5 km	MPC · JPL
764745	2013 HA_{78}	—	February 13, 2008	Kitt Peak	Spacewatch	·	1.2 km	MPC · JPL
764746	2013 HC_{78}	—	January 1, 2012	Mount Lemmon	Mount Lemmon Survey	·	1.2 km	MPC · JPL
764747	2013 HE_{79}	—	April 16, 2013	Cerro Tololo-DECam	DECam	·	1.6 km	MPC · JPL
764748	2013 HX_{92}	—	January 30, 2008	Mount Lemmon	Mount Lemmon Survey	·	1.2 km	MPC · JPL
764749	2013 HY_{97}	—	April 10, 2013	Haleakala	Pan-STARRS 1	·	1.2 km	MPC · JPL
764750	2013 HD_{102}	—	April 16, 2013	Cerro Tololo-DECam	DECam	·	470 m	MPC · JPL
764751	2013 HK_{102}	—	January 2, 2012	Mount Lemmon	Mount Lemmon Survey	·	1.3 km	MPC · JPL
764752	2013 HW_{104}	—	September 19, 1998	Apache Point	SDSS	·	1.6 km	MPC · JPL
764753	2013 HJ_{105}	—	April 10, 2013	Haleakala	Pan-STARRS 1	AST	1.3 km	MPC · JPL
764754	2013 HH_{109}	—	April 10, 2013	Haleakala	Pan-STARRS 1	·	1.1 km	MPC · JPL
764755	2013 HP_{109}	—	April 10, 2013	Haleakala	Pan-STARRS 1	EUN	840 m	MPC · JPL
764756	2013 HT_{112}	—	September 28, 2006	Kitt Peak	Spacewatch	·	930 m	MPC · JPL
764757	2013 HV_{113}	—	October 26, 2011	Haleakala	Pan-STARRS 1	ADE	1.1 km	MPC · JPL
764758	2013 HA_{115}	—	October 14, 2010	Mount Lemmon	Mount Lemmon Survey	·	1.2 km	MPC · JPL
764759	2013 HK_{118}	—	May 3, 2013	Haleakala	Pan-STARRS 1	·	380 m	MPC · JPL
764760	2013 HD_{127}	—	April 9, 2013	Haleakala	Pan-STARRS 1	PAD	1.1 km	MPC · JPL
764761	2013 HJ_{131}	—	April 9, 2013	Haleakala	Pan-STARRS 1	·	500 m	MPC · JPL
764762	2013 HN_{132}	—	October 1, 2011	Kitt Peak	Spacewatch	JUN	660 m	MPC · JPL
764763	2013 HQ_{133}	—	January 10, 2008	Kitt Peak	Spacewatch	·	1.0 km	MPC · JPL
764764	2013 HV_{133}	—	April 17, 2013	Cerro Tololo-DECam	DECam	AGN	770 m	MPC · JPL
764765	2013 HL_{136}	—	April 17, 2013	Cerro Tololo-DECam	DECam	·	1.0 km	MPC · JPL
764766	2013 HT_{136}	—	April 17, 2013	Cerro Tololo-DECam	DECam	·	630 m	MPC · JPL
764767	2013 HA_{139}	—	September 17, 2010	Mount Lemmon	Mount Lemmon Survey	·	2.1 km	MPC · JPL
764768	2013 HJ_{143}	—	April 17, 2013	Cerro Tololo-DECam	DECam	·	1.3 km	MPC · JPL
764769	2013 HY_{149}	—	September 11, 2010	Kitt Peak	Spacewatch	·	1.4 km	MPC · JPL
764770	2013 HX_{157}	—	April 19, 2013	Mount Lemmon	Mount Lemmon Survey	·	1.6 km	MPC · JPL
764771	2013 HY_{158}	—	April 16, 2013	Haleakala	Pan-STARRS 1	·	1.3 km	MPC · JPL
764772	2013 HL_{160}	—	April 19, 2013	Haleakala	Pan-STARRS 1	HNS	1.1 km	MPC · JPL
764773	2013 HJ_{161}	—	April 19, 2013	Haleakala	Pan-STARRS 1	·	1.5 km	MPC · JPL
764774	2013 HO_{161}	—	April 17, 2013	Haleakala	Pan-STARRS 1	PAD	1.2 km	MPC · JPL
764775	2013 HP_{161}	—	April 19, 2013	Haleakala	Pan-STARRS 1	·	1.4 km	MPC · JPL
764776	2013 HY_{161}	—	April 18, 2013	Kitt Peak	Spacewatch	·	1.3 km	MPC · JPL
764777	2013 HE_{165}	—	April 22, 2013	Haleakala	Pan-STARRS 1	·	1.5 km	MPC · JPL
764778	2013 JH_{2}	—	April 9, 2013	Haleakala	Pan-STARRS 1	·	560 m	MPC · JPL
764779	2013 JB_{10}	—	May 5, 2013	Haleakala	Pan-STARRS 1	·	470 m	MPC · JPL
764780	2013 JT_{12}	—	May 8, 2013	Haleakala	Pan-STARRS 1	·	1.2 km	MPC · JPL
764781	2013 JC_{27}	—	April 18, 2013	Mount Lemmon	Mount Lemmon Survey	·	1.4 km	MPC · JPL
764782	2013 JH_{32}	—	May 12, 2013	Mount Lemmon	Mount Lemmon Survey	·	550 m	MPC · JPL
764783	2013 JE_{49}	—	May 8, 2013	Haleakala	Pan-STARRS 1	·	1.9 km	MPC · JPL
764784	2013 JG_{52}	—	April 9, 2013	Haleakala	Pan-STARRS 1	·	1.4 km	MPC · JPL
764785	2013 JM_{52}	—	October 26, 2006	Mauna Kea	P. A. Wiegert	·	1.4 km	MPC · JPL
764786	2013 JW_{67}	—	May 8, 2013	Haleakala	Pan-STARRS 1	·	1.1 km	MPC · JPL
764787	2013 JJ_{68}	—	November 17, 2014	Mount Lemmon	Mount Lemmon Survey	·	450 m	MPC · JPL
764788	2013 JC_{71}	—	July 29, 2014	Haleakala	Pan-STARRS 1	WIT	800 m	MPC · JPL
764789	2013 JQ_{71}	—	February 22, 2017	Haleakala	Pan-STARRS 1	·	1.5 km	MPC · JPL
764790	2013 JV_{71}	—	May 12, 2013	Kitt Peak	Spacewatch	·	1.6 km	MPC · JPL
764791	2013 JD_{72}	—	May 15, 2013	Haleakala	Pan-STARRS 1	MAR	700 m	MPC · JPL
764792	2013 JX_{73}	—	March 25, 2017	Mount Lemmon	Mount Lemmon Survey	·	1.2 km	MPC · JPL
764793	2013 JD_{74}	—	September 2, 2014	Haleakala	Pan-STARRS 1	MRX	840 m	MPC · JPL
764794	2013 JJ_{74}	—	September 30, 2010	Mount Lemmon	Mount Lemmon Survey	·	1.4 km	MPC · JPL
764795	2013 JR_{74}	—	May 15, 2013	Haleakala	Pan-STARRS 1	·	1.7 km	MPC · JPL
764796	2013 JV_{74}	—	May 5, 2013	Haleakala	Pan-STARRS 1	·	840 m	MPC · JPL
764797	2013 JY_{74}	—	May 8, 2013	Haleakala	Pan-STARRS 1	·	1.7 km	MPC · JPL
764798	2013 JZ_{77}	—	May 9, 2013	Haleakala	Pan-STARRS 1	·	1.2 km	MPC · JPL
764799	2013 JL_{78}	—	May 8, 2013	Haleakala	Pan-STARRS 1	·	950 m	MPC · JPL
764800	2013 JE_{79}	—	May 12, 2013	Mount Lemmon	Mount Lemmon Survey	·	480 m	MPC · JPL

== 764801–764900 ==
back to top

Designation			Discovery			Properties		Ref
Permanent	Provisional	Named after	Date	Site	Discoverer(s)	Category	Diam.	Ref
764801	2013 KS_{4}	—	November 10, 2010	Mount Lemmon	Mount Lemmon Survey	AGN	860 m	MPC · JPL
764802	2013 KM_{11}	—	May 16, 2013	Haleakala	Pan-STARRS 1	·	2.1 km	MPC · JPL
764803	2013 KN_{12}	—	February 12, 2004	Kitt Peak	Spacewatch	·	1.0 km	MPC · JPL
764804	2013 KA_{15}	—	December 29, 2011	Kitt Peak	Spacewatch	EUN	1.2 km	MPC · JPL
764805	2013 KP_{15}	—	April 6, 2008	Mount Lemmon	Mount Lemmon Survey	·	2.1 km	MPC · JPL
764806	2013 KF_{19}	—	May 16, 2013	Haleakala	Pan-STARRS 1	·	1.6 km	MPC · JPL
764807	2013 KW_{19}	—	February 13, 2008	Kitt Peak	Spacewatch	·	1.4 km	MPC · JPL
764808	2013 LU_{4}	—	May 8, 2013	Haleakala	Pan-STARRS 1	·	950 m	MPC · JPL
764809	2013 LG_{14}	—	June 5, 2013	Mount Lemmon	Mount Lemmon Survey	EOS	3.9 km	MPC · JPL
764810	2013 LE_{18}	—	May 3, 2013	Mount Lemmon	Mount Lemmon Survey	·	1.5 km	MPC · JPL
764811	2013 LA_{21}	—	June 1, 2013	Haleakala	Pan-STARRS 1	·	1.5 km	MPC · JPL
764812	2013 LZ_{22}	—	May 2, 2013	Haleakala	Pan-STARRS 1	·	1.6 km	MPC · JPL
764813	2013 LJ_{37}	—	June 1, 2013	Mount Lemmon	Mount Lemmon Survey	·	620 m	MPC · JPL
764814	2013 LV_{37}	—	August 23, 2014	Haleakala	Pan-STARRS 1	·	1.6 km	MPC · JPL
764815	2013 LE_{38}	—	December 6, 2015	Haleakala	Pan-STARRS 1	EUN	800 m	MPC · JPL
764816	2013 LT_{38}	—	June 8, 2013	Mount Lemmon	Mount Lemmon Survey	·	510 m	MPC · JPL
764817	2013 LN_{40}	—	April 3, 2017	Mount Lemmon	Mount Lemmon Survey	AGN	800 m	MPC · JPL
764818	2013 LP_{41}	—	June 7, 2013	Haleakala	Pan-STARRS 1	·	1.3 km	MPC · JPL
764819	2013 LN_{44}	—	June 12, 2013	Haleakala	Pan-STARRS 1	·	1.5 km	MPC · JPL
764820	2013 MJ_{4}	—	June 18, 2013	Mount Lemmon	Mount Lemmon Survey	·	660 m	MPC · JPL
764821	2013 MP_{6}	—	June 18, 2013	Haleakala	Pan-STARRS 1	·	1.3 km	MPC · JPL
764822	2013 MH_{8}	—	June 7, 2013	Haleakala	Pan-STARRS 1	·	490 m	MPC · JPL
764823	2013 MA_{11}	—	June 18, 2013	Haleakala	Pan-STARRS 1	·	520 m	MPC · JPL
764824	2013 MJ_{12}	—	March 13, 2012	Mount Lemmon	Mount Lemmon Survey	·	1.7 km	MPC · JPL
764825	2013 MS_{13}	—	June 20, 2013	Haleakala	Pan-STARRS 1	·	920 m	MPC · JPL
764826	2013 MF_{14}	—	October 23, 2014	Kitt Peak	Spacewatch	·	680 m	MPC · JPL
764827	2013 MJ_{14}	—	September 2, 2014	Haleakala	Pan-STARRS 1	·	2.6 km	MPC · JPL
764828	2013 MS_{14}	—	June 18, 2013	Haleakala	Pan-STARRS 1	·	600 m	MPC · JPL
764829	2013 MC_{15}	—	June 18, 2013	Haleakala	Pan-STARRS 1	·	1.6 km	MPC · JPL
764830	2013 MH_{15}	—	June 19, 2013	Haleakala	Pan-STARRS 1	·	1.0 km	MPC · JPL
764831	2013 MF_{17}	—	March 2, 2016	Haleakala	Pan-STARRS 1	HNS	1.0 km	MPC · JPL
764832	2013 MQ_{17}	—	June 19, 2013	Haleakala	Pan-STARRS 1	GAL	1.1 km	MPC · JPL
764833	2013 MS_{17}	—	June 18, 2013	Haleakala	Pan-STARRS 1	·	1.5 km	MPC · JPL
764834	2013 MS_{19}	—	June 20, 2013	Haleakala	Pan-STARRS 1	EOS	1.6 km	MPC · JPL
764835	2013 MS_{20}	—	June 30, 2013	Haleakala	Pan-STARRS 1	·	490 m	MPC · JPL
764836	2013 NX_{3}	—	June 20, 2013	Haleakala	Pan-STARRS 1	·	2.0 km	MPC · JPL
764837	2013 NL_{7}	—	November 3, 2010	Mount Lemmon	Mount Lemmon Survey	·	540 m	MPC · JPL
764838	2013 NE_{11}	—	February 27, 2012	Haleakala	Pan-STARRS 1	·	2.5 km	MPC · JPL
764839	2013 NB_{12}	—	March 29, 2012	Haleakala	Pan-STARRS 1	·	1.6 km	MPC · JPL
764840	2013 NO_{12}	—	July 6, 2013	Haleakala	Pan-STARRS 1	·	530 m	MPC · JPL
764841	2013 NU_{13}	—	July 8, 2013	Westfield	International Astronomical Search Collaboration	·	2.4 km	MPC · JPL
764842	2013 NJ_{21}	—	January 26, 2012	Kitt Peak	Spacewatch	·	1.2 km	MPC · JPL
764843	2013 NL_{25}	—	September 15, 2009	Kitt Peak	Spacewatch	·	910 m	MPC · JPL
764844	2013 NZ_{26}	—	July 15, 2013	Haleakala	Pan-STARRS 1	·	1.3 km	MPC · JPL
764845	2013 NZ_{27}	—	September 5, 2008	Kitt Peak	Spacewatch	·	1.7 km	MPC · JPL
764846	2013 NJ_{28}	—	July 1, 2013	Haleakala	Pan-STARRS 1	KOR	1.0 km	MPC · JPL
764847	2013 NZ_{28}	—	July 12, 2013	Haleakala	Pan-STARRS 1	·	1.4 km	MPC · JPL
764848	2013 NC_{29}	—	July 13, 2013	Mount Lemmon	Mount Lemmon Survey	·	1.5 km	MPC · JPL
764849	2013 NE_{29}	—	July 13, 2013	Haleakala	Pan-STARRS 1	·	2.4 km	MPC · JPL
764850	2013 NJ_{29}	—	July 14, 2013	Haleakala	Pan-STARRS 1	·	1.7 km	MPC · JPL
764851	2013 NW_{29}	—	July 14, 2013	Haleakala	Pan-STARRS 1	·	1.5 km	MPC · JPL
764852	2013 NV_{30}	—	July 14, 2013	Haleakala	Pan-STARRS 1	·	1.3 km	MPC · JPL
764853	2013 NW_{30}	—	July 14, 2013	Haleakala	Pan-STARRS 1	·	1.3 km	MPC · JPL
764854	2013 NF_{31}	—	July 14, 2013	Haleakala	Pan-STARRS 1	EUN	840 m	MPC · JPL
764855	2013 NV_{31}	—	July 15, 2013	Haleakala	Pan-STARRS 1	·	1.6 km	MPC · JPL
764856	2013 NF_{32}	—	July 15, 2013	Haleakala	Pan-STARRS 1	·	1.8 km	MPC · JPL
764857	2013 NM_{32}	—	April 27, 2012	Haleakala	Pan-STARRS 1	·	1.3 km	MPC · JPL
764858	2013 NP_{32}	—	July 15, 2013	Haleakala	Pan-STARRS 1	·	1.2 km	MPC · JPL
764859	2013 NS_{32}	—	February 25, 2011	Mount Lemmon	Mount Lemmon Survey	KOR	940 m	MPC · JPL
764860	2013 NV_{32}	—	August 23, 2004	Kitt Peak	Spacewatch	·	1.2 km	MPC · JPL
764861	2013 NE_{34}	—	March 11, 2016	Haleakala	Pan-STARRS 1	·	580 m	MPC · JPL
764862	2013 NF_{34}	—	July 12, 2013	Haleakala	Pan-STARRS 1	·	1.6 km	MPC · JPL
764863	2013 NG_{34}	—	January 21, 2015	Haleakala	Pan-STARRS 1	·	590 m	MPC · JPL
764864	2013 NJ_{34}	—	July 15, 2013	Haleakala	Pan-STARRS 1	·	640 m	MPC · JPL
764865	2013 NL_{34}	—	July 13, 2013	Mount Lemmon	Mount Lemmon Survey	EOS	1.3 km	MPC · JPL
764866	2013 NP_{34}	—	July 1, 2013	Haleakala	Pan-STARRS 1	·	510 m	MPC · JPL
764867	2013 NT_{34}	—	July 15, 2013	Haleakala	Pan-STARRS 1	URS	2.4 km	MPC · JPL
764868	2013 NV_{34}	—	August 20, 2014	Haleakala	Pan-STARRS 1	·	1.2 km	MPC · JPL
764869	2013 NJ_{35}	—	July 12, 2013	Haleakala	Pan-STARRS 1	EOS	1.4 km	MPC · JPL
764870	2013 NN_{35}	—	December 15, 2014	Mount Lemmon	Mount Lemmon Survey	V	430 m	MPC · JPL
764871	2013 NX_{35}	—	June 20, 2013	Mount Lemmon	Mount Lemmon Survey	V	430 m	MPC · JPL
764872	2013 NZ_{35}	—	July 14, 2013	Haleakala	Pan-STARRS 1	·	450 m	MPC · JPL
764873	2013 NS_{36}	—	July 13, 2013	Haleakala	Pan-STARRS 1	·	490 m	MPC · JPL
764874	2013 NY_{38}	—	July 15, 2013	Haleakala	Pan-STARRS 1	·	1.6 km	MPC · JPL
764875	2013 NE_{40}	—	August 30, 2014	Haleakala	Pan-STARRS 1	·	1.3 km	MPC · JPL
764876	2013 NO_{40}	—	July 28, 2007	Mauna Kea	P. A. Wiegert, N. I. Hasan	EOS	1.4 km	MPC · JPL
764877	2013 NO_{41}	—	July 14, 2013	Haleakala	Pan-STARRS 1	·	1.5 km	MPC · JPL
764878	2013 NX_{48}	—	July 13, 2013	Haleakala	Pan-STARRS 1	·	1.3 km	MPC · JPL
764879	2013 NU_{49}	—	July 14, 2013	Haleakala	Pan-STARRS 1	H	310 m	MPC · JPL
764880	2013 NF_{50}	—	July 12, 2013	Haleakala	Pan-STARRS 1	·	1.9 km	MPC · JPL
764881	2013 NB_{51}	—	July 15, 2013	Haleakala	Pan-STARRS 1	·	770 m	MPC · JPL
764882	2013 NL_{51}	—	July 15, 2013	Haleakala	Pan-STARRS 1	V	360 m	MPC · JPL
764883	2013 NY_{52}	—	July 6, 2013	Haleakala	Pan-STARRS 1	·	1.3 km	MPC · JPL
764884	2013 NO_{53}	—	July 14, 2013	Haleakala	Pan-STARRS 1	·	1.2 km	MPC · JPL
764885	2013 NK_{54}	—	July 9, 2013	Haleakala	Pan-STARRS 1	·	1.7 km	MPC · JPL
764886	2013 NU_{55}	—	July 15, 2013	Haleakala	Pan-STARRS 1	·	1.9 km	MPC · JPL
764887	2013 NW_{56}	—	July 13, 2013	Haleakala	Pan-STARRS 1	·	2.3 km	MPC · JPL
764888	2013 NS_{57}	—	July 15, 2013	Haleakala	Pan-STARRS 1	MAR	710 m	MPC · JPL
764889	2013 NB_{58}	—	July 13, 2013	Haleakala	Pan-STARRS 1	·	1.3 km	MPC · JPL
764890	2013 NE_{58}	—	July 14, 2013	Haleakala	Pan-STARRS 1	·	1.5 km	MPC · JPL
764891	2013 NL_{58}	—	July 14, 2013	Haleakala	Pan-STARRS 1	·	1.5 km	MPC · JPL
764892	2013 NN_{59}	—	July 14, 2013	Haleakala	Pan-STARRS 1	·	1.3 km	MPC · JPL
764893	2013 NB_{66}	—	July 14, 2013	Haleakala	Pan-STARRS 1	·	1.6 km	MPC · JPL
764894	2013 NJ_{67}	—	July 14, 2013	Haleakala	Pan-STARRS 1	·	460 m	MPC · JPL
764895	2013 OQ_{1}	—	July 17, 2013	Haleakala	Pan-STARRS 1	·	1.8 km	MPC · JPL
764896	2013 OR_{7}	—	July 30, 2013	Kitt Peak	Spacewatch	·	1.7 km	MPC · JPL
764897	2013 OT_{10}	—	July 17, 2013	Haleakala	Pan-STARRS 1	·	2.4 km	MPC · JPL
764898	2013 OK_{12}	—	April 19, 2007	Kitt Peak	Spacewatch	·	1.6 km	MPC · JPL
764899	2013 OB_{14}	—	July 16, 2013	Haleakala	Pan-STARRS 1	H	370 m	MPC · JPL
764900	2013 OK_{14}	—	March 19, 2017	Mount Lemmon	Mount Lemmon Survey	·	3.2 km	MPC · JPL

== 764901–765000 ==
back to top

Designation			Discovery			Properties		Ref
Permanent	Provisional	Named after	Date	Site	Discoverer(s)	Category	Diam.	Ref
764901	2013 OD_{16}	—	July 17, 2013	Haleakala	Pan-STARRS 1	H	370 m	MPC · JPL
764902	2013 OJ_{16}	—	July 28, 2013	Kitt Peak	Spacewatch	·	770 m	MPC · JPL
764903	2013 OR_{16}	—	July 16, 2013	Haleakala	Pan-STARRS 1	·	3.0 km	MPC · JPL
764904	2013 OH_{18}	—	July 16, 2013	Haleakala	Pan-STARRS 1	·	1.3 km	MPC · JPL
764905	2013 OM_{18}	—	July 16, 2013	Haleakala	Pan-STARRS 1	EOS	1.5 km	MPC · JPL
764906	2013 ON_{18}	—	July 16, 2013	Haleakala	Pan-STARRS 1	·	1.5 km	MPC · JPL
764907	2013 PQ_{5}	—	August 2, 2013	Haleakala	Pan-STARRS 1	·	520 m	MPC · JPL
764908	2013 PW_{5}	—	January 30, 2011	Mount Lemmon	Mount Lemmon Survey	·	1.2 km	MPC · JPL
764909	2013 PR_{13}	—	October 30, 2005	Mount Lemmon	Mount Lemmon Survey	EUN	940 m	MPC · JPL
764910	2013 PM_{18}	—	July 14, 2013	Haleakala	Pan-STARRS 1	·	770 m	MPC · JPL
764911	2013 PQ_{24}	—	October 3, 2006	Mount Lemmon	Mount Lemmon Survey	·	710 m	MPC · JPL
764912	2013 PG_{26}	—	June 20, 2013	Haleakala	Pan-STARRS 1	H	420 m	MPC · JPL
764913	2013 PU_{27}	—	September 23, 2008	Kitt Peak	Spacewatch	·	1.4 km	MPC · JPL
764914	2013 PV_{32}	—	August 7, 2013	Kitt Peak	Spacewatch	·	1.6 km	MPC · JPL
764915	2013 PY_{32}	—	October 3, 2008	Kitt Peak	Spacewatch	(1298)	1.8 km	MPC · JPL
764916	2013 PQ_{35}	—	August 9, 2013	Kitt Peak	Spacewatch	·	470 m	MPC · JPL
764917	2013 PO_{45}	—	September 7, 2008	Mount Lemmon	Mount Lemmon Survey	·	1.3 km	MPC · JPL
764918	2013 PU_{46}	—	July 15, 2013	Haleakala	Pan-STARRS 1	GAL	1.3 km	MPC · JPL
764919	2013 PA_{51}	—	August 12, 2013	Haleakala	Pan-STARRS 1	·	950 m	MPC · JPL
764920	2013 PT_{51}	—	October 24, 2009	Kitt Peak	Spacewatch	·	1.3 km	MPC · JPL
764921	2013 PC_{57}	—	November 24, 2003	Anderson Mesa	LONEOS	·	1.5 km	MPC · JPL
764922	2013 PK_{58}	—	July 16, 2013	Haleakala	Pan-STARRS 1	·	700 m	MPC · JPL
764923	2013 PR_{59}	—	July 15, 2013	Haleakala	Pan-STARRS 1	·	540 m	MPC · JPL
764924	2013 PF_{60}	—	August 15, 2013	Haleakala	Pan-STARRS 1	·	1.4 km	MPC · JPL
764925	2013 PY_{62}	—	July 15, 2013	Haleakala	Pan-STARRS 1	·	1.4 km	MPC · JPL
764926	2013 PP_{63}	—	January 23, 2011	Mount Lemmon	Mount Lemmon Survey	·	1.4 km	MPC · JPL
764927	2013 PX_{64}	—	July 15, 2013	Haleakala	Pan-STARRS 1	NAE	1.9 km	MPC · JPL
764928	2013 PB_{65}	—	August 15, 2013	Haleakala	Pan-STARRS 1	EOS	1.2 km	MPC · JPL
764929	2013 PU_{74}	—	August 4, 2013	Haleakala	Pan-STARRS 1	centaur	50 km	MPC · JPL
764930	2013 PM_{78}	—	August 15, 2013	Haleakala	Pan-STARRS 1	·	1.3 km	MPC · JPL
764931	2013 PO_{78}	—	March 1, 2011	Mount Lemmon	Mount Lemmon Survey	KOR	1.0 km	MPC · JPL
764932	2013 PY_{79}	—	March 15, 2012	Mount Lemmon	Mount Lemmon Survey	·	870 m	MPC · JPL
764933	2013 PJ_{80}	—	August 7, 2008	Kitt Peak	Spacewatch	·	1.6 km	MPC · JPL
764934	2013 PG_{81}	—	August 12, 2013	Haleakala	Pan-STARRS 1	·	1.3 km	MPC · JPL
764935	2013 PR_{81}	—	August 14, 2013	Haleakala	Pan-STARRS 1	KOR	1.1 km	MPC · JPL
764936	2013 PB_{82}	—	August 14, 2013	Haleakala	Pan-STARRS 1	·	1.6 km	MPC · JPL
764937	2013 PJ_{82}	—	August 15, 2013	Haleakala	Pan-STARRS 1	·	1.1 km	MPC · JPL
764938	2013 PO_{85}	—	August 8, 2013	Haleakala	Pan-STARRS 1	·	750 m	MPC · JPL
764939	2013 PD_{86}	—	August 12, 2013	Haleakala	Pan-STARRS 1	·	2.7 km	MPC · JPL
764940	2013 PV_{90}	—	August 14, 2013	Haleakala	Pan-STARRS 1	·	1.6 km	MPC · JPL
764941	2013 PM_{91}	—	November 21, 2014	Haleakala	Pan-STARRS 1	·	1.4 km	MPC · JPL
764942	2013 PW_{91}	—	October 19, 2003	Kitt Peak	Spacewatch	·	1.2 km	MPC · JPL
764943	2013 PY_{91}	—	August 14, 2013	Haleakala	Pan-STARRS 1	·	1.7 km	MPC · JPL
764944	2013 PZ_{91}	—	December 3, 2014	Haleakala	Pan-STARRS 1	·	1.5 km	MPC · JPL
764945	2013 PK_{92}	—	January 11, 2008	Kitt Peak	Spacewatch	·	1.1 km	MPC · JPL
764946	2013 PM_{92}	—	July 8, 2018	Haleakala	Pan-STARRS 1	·	1.6 km	MPC · JPL
764947	2013 PN_{92}	—	August 14, 2013	Haleakala	Pan-STARRS 1	·	2.1 km	MPC · JPL
764948	2013 PH_{93}	—	August 9, 2013	Haleakala	Pan-STARRS 1	·	1.4 km	MPC · JPL
764949	2013 PQ_{95}	—	January 14, 2016	Haleakala	Pan-STARRS 1	·	2.9 km	MPC · JPL
764950	2013 PF_{97}	—	August 14, 2013	Haleakala	Pan-STARRS 1	·	1.7 km	MPC · JPL
764951	2013 PP_{98}	—	August 14, 2013	Haleakala	Pan-STARRS 1	·	2.1 km	MPC · JPL
764952	2013 PS_{98}	—	March 24, 2006	Mount Lemmon	Mount Lemmon Survey	EOS	1.5 km	MPC · JPL
764953	2013 PV_{99}	—	August 9, 2013	Haleakala	Pan-STARRS 1	·	1.9 km	MPC · JPL
764954	2013 PT_{100}	—	August 8, 2013	Kitt Peak	Spacewatch	·	1.5 km	MPC · JPL
764955	2013 PV_{100}	—	August 14, 2013	Haleakala	Pan-STARRS 1	·	2.2 km	MPC · JPL
764956	2013 PS_{101}	—	August 9, 2013	Haleakala	Pan-STARRS 1	EOS	1.5 km	MPC · JPL
764957	2013 PM_{102}	—	August 15, 2013	Haleakala	Pan-STARRS 1	·	1.4 km	MPC · JPL
764958	2013 PV_{102}	—	August 14, 2013	Haleakala	Pan-STARRS 1	·	1.4 km	MPC · JPL
764959	2013 PO_{105}	—	August 15, 2013	Haleakala	Pan-STARRS 1	·	520 m	MPC · JPL
764960	2013 PT_{105}	—	August 14, 2013	Haleakala	Pan-STARRS 1	·	1.3 km	MPC · JPL
764961	2013 PE_{106}	—	August 12, 2013	Haleakala	Pan-STARRS 1	HOF	1.9 km	MPC · JPL
764962	2013 PK_{106}	—	August 12, 2013	Haleakala	Pan-STARRS 1	·	1.3 km	MPC · JPL
764963	2013 PN_{106}	—	August 12, 2013	Haleakala	Pan-STARRS 1	·	1.4 km	MPC · JPL
764964	2013 PB_{108}	—	August 12, 2013	Haleakala	Pan-STARRS 1	V	360 m	MPC · JPL
764965	2013 PH_{110}	—	August 9, 2013	Haleakala	Pan-STARRS 1	·	1.3 km	MPC · JPL
764966	2013 PW_{114}	—	August 14, 2013	Haleakala	Pan-STARRS 1	·	1.5 km	MPC · JPL
764967	2013 PO_{118}	—	August 9, 2013	Haleakala	Pan-STARRS 1	BRA	1.1 km	MPC · JPL
764968	2013 PV_{121}	—	August 14, 2013	Haleakala	Pan-STARRS 1	·	1.5 km	MPC · JPL
764969	2013 PC_{122}	—	August 12, 2013	Haleakala	Pan-STARRS 1	·	1.4 km	MPC · JPL
764970	2013 PN_{125}	—	August 4, 2013	Haleakala	Pan-STARRS 1	·	1.3 km	MPC · JPL
764971	2013 PY_{125}	—	August 8, 2013	Haleakala	Pan-STARRS 1	·	1.4 km	MPC · JPL
764972	2013 PB_{136}	—	August 8, 2013	Haleakala	Pan-STARRS 1	·	1.2 km	MPC · JPL
764973	2013 PC_{136}	—	August 15, 2013	Haleakala	Pan-STARRS 1	TEL	960 m	MPC · JPL
764974	2013 PL_{137}	—	August 15, 2013	Haleakala	Pan-STARRS 1	·	1.9 km	MPC · JPL
764975	2013 PE_{139}	—	August 9, 2013	Haleakala	Pan-STARRS 1	EOS	1.2 km	MPC · JPL
764976	2013 PD_{140}	—	August 9, 2013	Haleakala	Pan-STARRS 1	·	1.6 km	MPC · JPL
764977	2013 PQ_{141}	—	August 15, 2013	Haleakala	Pan-STARRS 1	·	1.2 km	MPC · JPL
764978	2013 QW_{3}	—	October 30, 2010	Mount Lemmon	Mount Lemmon Survey	·	550 m	MPC · JPL
764979	2013 QH_{6}	—	August 9, 2013	Haleakala	Pan-STARRS 1	H	410 m	MPC · JPL
764980	2013 QE_{8}	—	March 11, 2005	Kitt Peak	Deep Ecliptic Survey	·	2.3 km	MPC · JPL
764981	2013 QX_{17}	—	September 17, 2006	Kitt Peak	Spacewatch	NYS	600 m	MPC · JPL
764982	2013 QX_{19}	—	October 6, 2008	Mount Lemmon	Mount Lemmon Survey	·	2.5 km	MPC · JPL
764983	2013 QU_{20}	—	August 26, 2013	Haleakala	Pan-STARRS 1	·	840 m	MPC · JPL
764984	2013 QV_{20}	—	August 9, 2013	Kitt Peak	Spacewatch	V	450 m	MPC · JPL
764985	2013 QR_{24}	—	August 26, 2013	Haleakala	Pan-STARRS 1	·	1.4 km	MPC · JPL
764986	2013 QM_{33}	—	March 15, 2012	Kitt Peak	Spacewatch	·	1.4 km	MPC · JPL
764987	2013 QN_{33}	—	August 30, 2013	Haleakala	Pan-STARRS 1	·	2.4 km	MPC · JPL
764988	2013 QB_{34}	—	July 29, 2008	Kitt Peak	Spacewatch	KOR	1.1 km	MPC · JPL
764989	2013 QJ_{39}	—	August 12, 2013	Haleakala	Pan-STARRS 1	PHO	540 m	MPC · JPL
764990	2013 QF_{45}	—	August 30, 2013	Haleakala	Pan-STARRS 1	·	1.5 km	MPC · JPL
764991	2013 QM_{45}	—	August 15, 2013	Haleakala	Pan-STARRS 1	·	1.8 km	MPC · JPL
764992	2013 QL_{60}	—	August 14, 2013	Haleakala	Pan-STARRS 1	·	1.6 km	MPC · JPL
764993	2013 QQ_{60}	—	September 17, 2009	Kitt Peak	Spacewatch	·	1.3 km	MPC · JPL
764994	2013 QC_{66}	—	August 28, 2013	Mount Lemmon	Mount Lemmon Survey	·	1.8 km	MPC · JPL
764995	2013 QK_{74}	—	February 10, 2011	Mount Lemmon	Mount Lemmon Survey	ADE	1.5 km	MPC · JPL
764996	2013 QG_{77}	—	September 19, 2008	Kitt Peak	Spacewatch	·	1.4 km	MPC · JPL
764997	2013 QK_{82}	—	August 31, 2013	Haleakala	Pan-STARRS 1	EOS	1.3 km	MPC · JPL
764998	2013 QX_{87}	—	September 6, 2008	Mount Lemmon	Mount Lemmon Survey	EOS	1.1 km	MPC · JPL
764999	2013 QH_{88}	—	July 16, 2004	Cerro Tololo	Deep Ecliptic Survey	AGN	790 m	MPC · JPL
765000	2013 QL_{88}	—	August 26, 2013	Haleakala	Pan-STARRS 1	·	1.8 km	MPC · JPL

back to top
