= List of minor planets: 775001–776000 =

The following is a partial list of minor planets, running from minor-planet number 775001 through 776000, inclusive. The primary data for this and other partial lists is based on JPL's "Small-Body Orbital Elements" and data available from the Minor Planet Center. Critical list information is also provided by the MPC, unless otherwise specified from Lowell Observatory. A detailed description of the table's columns and additional sources are given on the main page including a complete list of every page in this series, and a statistical break-up on the dynamical classification of minor planets.

Also see the summary list of all named bodies in numerical and alphabetical order, and the corresponding naming citations for the number range of this particular list. New namings may only be added to this list after official publication, as the preannouncement of names is condemned by the Working Group for Small Bodies Nomenclature of the International Astronomical Union.

Near-Earth obj.	MBA (inner)	MBA (outer)	Centaur
Mars-crosser	MBA (middle)	Jupiter trojan	Trans-Neptunian obj.
Unclassified

== 775001–775100 ==
Designation			Discovery			Properties		Ref
Permanent	Provisional	Named after	Date	Site	Discoverer(s)	Category	Diam.	Ref
775001	2005 YW_{19}	—	December 5, 2005	Mount Lemmon	Mount Lemmon Survey	·	1.7 km	MPC · JPL
775002	2005 YY_{21}	—	December 24, 2005	Kitt Peak	Spacewatch	THM	1.8 km	MPC · JPL
775003	2005 YN_{74}	—	December 24, 2005	Kitt Peak	Spacewatch	EOS	1.4 km	MPC · JPL
775004	2005 YS_{79}	—	December 24, 2005	Kitt Peak	Spacewatch	·	1.4 km	MPC · JPL
775005	2005 YH_{100}	—	November 10, 2005	Mount Lemmon	Mount Lemmon Survey	·	980 m	MPC · JPL
775006	2005 YR_{100}	—	December 24, 2005	Kitt Peak	Spacewatch	·	990 m	MPC · JPL
775007	2005 YN_{101}	—	December 25, 2005	Kitt Peak	Spacewatch	EOS	1.3 km	MPC · JPL
775008	2005 YL_{123}	—	December 24, 2005	Kitt Peak	Spacewatch	·	1.5 km	MPC · JPL
775009	2005 YC_{130}	—	December 24, 2005	Kitt Peak	Spacewatch	·	1.2 km	MPC · JPL
775010	2005 YZ_{140}	—	December 28, 2005	Mount Lemmon	Mount Lemmon Survey	EOS	1.3 km	MPC · JPL
775011	2005 YL_{142}	—	December 28, 2005	Kitt Peak	Spacewatch	·	1.3 km	MPC · JPL
775012	2005 YH_{176}	—	December 22, 2005	Kitt Peak	Spacewatch	·	850 m	MPC · JPL
775013	2005 YD_{189}	—	December 25, 2005	Mount Lemmon	Mount Lemmon Survey	THM	1.7 km	MPC · JPL
775014	2005 YT_{190}	—	December 30, 2005	Kitt Peak	Spacewatch	·	1.5 km	MPC · JPL
775015	2005 YL_{195}	—	December 31, 2005	Kitt Peak	Spacewatch	·	1.3 km	MPC · JPL
775016	2005 YE_{199}	—	December 25, 2005	Mount Lemmon	Mount Lemmon Survey	·	1.3 km	MPC · JPL
775017	2005 YY_{230}	—	November 26, 2005	Mount Lemmon	Mount Lemmon Survey	AGN	910 m	MPC · JPL
775018	2005 YK_{232}	—	February 6, 2002	Kitt Peak	Deep Ecliptic Survey	·	1.2 km	MPC · JPL
775019	2005 YD_{242}	—	December 30, 2005	Kitt Peak	Spacewatch	·	1.1 km	MPC · JPL
775020	2005 YP_{250}	—	December 28, 2005	Kitt Peak	Spacewatch	·	1.3 km	MPC · JPL
775021	2005 YV_{258}	—	December 24, 2005	Kitt Peak	Spacewatch	·	1.2 km	MPC · JPL
775022	2005 YE_{260}	—	December 24, 2005	Kitt Peak	Spacewatch	·	1.3 km	MPC · JPL
775023	2005 YB_{264}	—	December 25, 2005	Kitt Peak	Spacewatch	·	1.3 km	MPC · JPL
775024	2005 YO_{265}	—	December 26, 2005	Kitt Peak	Spacewatch	NEM	1.8 km	MPC · JPL
775025	2005 YM_{290}	—	December 25, 2005	Mount Lemmon	Mount Lemmon Survey	·	1.6 km	MPC · JPL
775026	2005 YT_{292}	—	December 24, 2005	Kitt Peak	Spacewatch	·	1.9 km	MPC · JPL
775027	2005 YP_{294}	—	November 17, 2009	Kitt Peak	Spacewatch	·	1.1 km	MPC · JPL
775028	2005 YO_{295}	—	December 25, 2005	Mount Lemmon	Mount Lemmon Survey	·	1.4 km	MPC · JPL
775029	2005 YJ_{299}	—	February 10, 2016	Haleakala	Pan-STARRS 1	BRA	880 m	MPC · JPL
775030	2005 YX_{299}	—	February 29, 2016	Haleakala	Pan-STARRS 1	·	1.4 km	MPC · JPL
775031	2005 YJ_{300}	—	December 25, 2005	Kitt Peak	Spacewatch	AGN	800 m	MPC · JPL
775032	2006 AQ_{24}	—	December 28, 2005	Mount Lemmon	Mount Lemmon Survey	·	1.2 km	MPC · JPL
775033	2006 AB_{39}	—	January 7, 2006	Mount Lemmon	Mount Lemmon Survey	·	880 m	MPC · JPL
775034	2006 AG_{66}	—	January 9, 2006	Kitt Peak	Spacewatch	·	1.3 km	MPC · JPL
775035	2006 AC_{82}	—	January 6, 2006	Kitt Peak	Spacewatch	·	1.4 km	MPC · JPL
775036	2006 AV_{87}	—	January 5, 2006	Mount Lemmon	Mount Lemmon Survey	·	1.5 km	MPC · JPL
775037	2006 AB_{98}	—	December 24, 2005	Kitt Peak	Spacewatch	·	2.0 km	MPC · JPL
775038	2006 AM_{108}	—	January 7, 2006	Mount Lemmon	Mount Lemmon Survey	·	2.1 km	MPC · JPL
775039	2006 AQ_{109}	—	January 29, 2016	Mount Lemmon	Mount Lemmon Survey	·	1.5 km	MPC · JPL
775040	2006 AV_{109}	—	November 1, 2013	Catalina	CSS	·	990 m	MPC · JPL
775041	2006 AM_{112}	—	January 9, 2006	Mount Lemmon	Mount Lemmon Survey	·	1.3 km	MPC · JPL
775042	2006 AA_{115}	—	January 8, 2006	Mount Lemmon	Mount Lemmon Survey	·	1.1 km	MPC · JPL
775043	2006 AJ_{116}	—	January 8, 2006	Kitt Peak	Spacewatch	·	930 m	MPC · JPL
775044	2006 AF_{117}	—	January 5, 2006	Mount Lemmon	Mount Lemmon Survey	·	1.1 km	MPC · JPL
775045	2006 BU_{3}	—	January 21, 2006	Kitt Peak	Spacewatch	·	940 m	MPC · JPL
775046	2006 BC_{16}	—	January 22, 2006	Mount Lemmon	Mount Lemmon Survey	·	2.4 km	MPC · JPL
775047	2006 BG_{17}	—	January 22, 2006	Mount Lemmon	Mount Lemmon Survey	·	1.2 km	MPC · JPL
775048	2006 BG_{21}	—	January 22, 2006	Mount Lemmon	Mount Lemmon Survey	·	830 m	MPC · JPL
775049	2006 BN_{36}	—	January 23, 2006	Kitt Peak	Spacewatch	EOS	1.3 km	MPC · JPL
775050	2006 BG_{41}	—	January 22, 2006	Mount Lemmon	Mount Lemmon Survey	·	1.4 km	MPC · JPL
775051	2006 BM_{42}	—	January 23, 2006	Kitt Peak	Spacewatch	·	1.4 km	MPC · JPL
775052	2006 BX_{47}	—	January 25, 2006	Kitt Peak	Spacewatch	KOR	980 m	MPC · JPL
775053	2006 BR_{60}	—	January 26, 2006	Mount Lemmon	Mount Lemmon Survey	·	1.4 km	MPC · JPL
775054	2006 BF_{68}	—	January 23, 2006	Kitt Peak	Spacewatch	·	900 m	MPC · JPL
775055	2006 BM_{74}	—	January 23, 2006	Kitt Peak	Spacewatch	·	1.0 km	MPC · JPL
775056	2006 BK_{84}	—	January 25, 2006	Kitt Peak	Spacewatch	·	760 m	MPC · JPL
775057	2006 BP_{86}	—	January 25, 2006	Kitt Peak	Spacewatch	HYG	2.1 km	MPC · JPL
775058	2006 BY_{133}	—	January 26, 2006	Mount Lemmon	Mount Lemmon Survey	·	2.3 km	MPC · JPL
775059	2006 BU_{163}	—	January 26, 2006	Mount Lemmon	Mount Lemmon Survey	HOF	1.9 km	MPC · JPL
775060	2006 BS_{173}	—	January 27, 2006	Kitt Peak	Spacewatch	·	1.5 km	MPC · JPL
775061	2006 BH_{176}	—	January 27, 2006	Kitt Peak	Spacewatch	EOS	1.3 km	MPC · JPL
775062	2006 BK_{180}	—	January 27, 2006	Mount Lemmon	Mount Lemmon Survey	KOR	1.1 km	MPC · JPL
775063	2006 BY_{183}	—	January 28, 2006	Mount Lemmon	Mount Lemmon Survey	·	1.3 km	MPC · JPL
775064	2006 BD_{196}	—	January 30, 2006	Kitt Peak	Spacewatch	·	1.3 km	MPC · JPL
775065	2006 BO_{204}	—	January 31, 2006	Kitt Peak	Spacewatch	·	1.1 km	MPC · JPL
775066	2006 BH_{207}	—	January 31, 2006	Mount Lemmon	Mount Lemmon Survey	·	940 m	MPC · JPL
775067	2006 BO_{220}	—	January 30, 2006	Kitt Peak	Spacewatch	·	1.4 km	MPC · JPL
775068	2006 BD_{239}	—	January 31, 2006	Mount Lemmon	Mount Lemmon Survey	·	1.3 km	MPC · JPL
775069	2006 BN_{241}	—	January 31, 2006	Kitt Peak	Spacewatch	·	2.0 km	MPC · JPL
775070	2006 BJ_{251}	—	January 31, 2006	Kitt Peak	Spacewatch	·	1.4 km	MPC · JPL
775071	2006 BW_{264}	—	January 31, 2006	Kitt Peak	Spacewatch	THM	1.7 km	MPC · JPL
775072	2006 BP_{279}	—	January 31, 2006	Kitt Peak	Spacewatch	·	1.6 km	MPC · JPL
775073	2006 BJ_{281}	—	January 31, 2006	Kitt Peak	Spacewatch	·	2.9 km	MPC · JPL
775074	2006 BX_{284}	—	January 25, 2006	Kitt Peak	Spacewatch	AGN	800 m	MPC · JPL
775075	2006 BC_{289}	—	January 23, 2006	Mount Lemmon	Mount Lemmon Survey	(895)	2.8 km	MPC · JPL
775076	2006 BT_{289}	—	January 23, 2006	Kitt Peak	Spacewatch	·	1.7 km	MPC · JPL
775077	2006 BQ_{291}	—	November 11, 2009	Mount Lemmon	Mount Lemmon Survey	AST	1.3 km	MPC · JPL
775078	2006 BH_{296}	—	January 31, 2006	Kitt Peak	Spacewatch	·	1.3 km	MPC · JPL
775079	2006 BV_{297}	—	January 30, 2006	Kitt Peak	Spacewatch	DOR	1.5 km	MPC · JPL
775080	2006 BY_{297}	—	January 23, 2006	Kitt Peak	Spacewatch	·	1.6 km	MPC · JPL
775081	2006 BH_{299}	—	January 23, 2006	Kitt Peak	Spacewatch	·	1.5 km	MPC · JPL
775082	2006 BR_{300}	—	January 25, 2006	Kitt Peak	Spacewatch	KOR	980 m	MPC · JPL
775083	2006 BV_{300}	—	January 26, 2006	Mount Lemmon	Mount Lemmon Survey	KOR	1.0 km	MPC · JPL
775084	2006 BD_{301}	—	January 23, 2006	Kitt Peak	Spacewatch	·	1.5 km	MPC · JPL
775085	2006 BF_{302}	—	January 27, 2006	Mount Lemmon	Mount Lemmon Survey	TIR	2.1 km	MPC · JPL
775086	2006 CP_{1}	—	February 1, 2006	Kitt Peak	Spacewatch	·	960 m	MPC · JPL
775087	2006 CU_{26}	—	January 22, 2006	Mount Lemmon	Mount Lemmon Survey	·	1.4 km	MPC · JPL
775088	2006 CK_{28}	—	February 2, 2006	Kitt Peak	Spacewatch	615	930 m	MPC · JPL
775089	2006 CZ_{36}	—	February 2, 2006	Mount Lemmon	Mount Lemmon Survey	KOR	1.0 km	MPC · JPL
775090	2006 CZ_{53}	—	February 4, 2006	Mount Lemmon	Mount Lemmon Survey	GAL	1.0 km	MPC · JPL
775091	2006 CY_{55}	—	February 4, 2006	Mount Lemmon	Mount Lemmon Survey	·	1.3 km	MPC · JPL
775092	2006 CF_{78}	—	January 26, 2006	Mount Lemmon	Mount Lemmon Survey	EOS	1.6 km	MPC · JPL
775093	2006 CN_{85}	—	January 4, 2016	Haleakala	Pan-STARRS 1	EOS	1.3 km	MPC · JPL
775094	2006 CA_{86}	—	January 23, 2015	Haleakala	Pan-STARRS 1	·	1.2 km	MPC · JPL
775095	2006 CZ_{87}	—	February 4, 2006	Kitt Peak	Spacewatch	KOR	1.1 km	MPC · JPL
775096	2006 CK_{88}	—	December 4, 2012	Mount Lemmon	Mount Lemmon Survey	3:2	3.4 km	MPC · JPL
775097	2006 CL_{88}	—	March 20, 2017	Haleakala	Pan-STARRS 1	·	1.7 km	MPC · JPL
775098	2006 CV_{88}	—	September 5, 2019	Mount Lemmon	Mount Lemmon Survey	·	1.7 km	MPC · JPL
775099	2006 DG_{44}	—	January 23, 2006	Kitt Peak	Spacewatch	·	1.3 km	MPC · JPL
775100	2006 DM_{45}	—	February 20, 2006	Mount Lemmon	Mount Lemmon Survey	·	1.6 km	MPC · JPL

== 775101–775200 ==
back to top

Designation			Discovery			Properties		Ref
Permanent	Provisional	Named after	Date	Site	Discoverer(s)	Category	Diam.	Ref
775101	2006 DX_{47}	—	February 21, 2006	Mount Lemmon	Mount Lemmon Survey	·	1.2 km	MPC · JPL
775102	2006 DZ_{74}	—	January 23, 2006	Kitt Peak	Spacewatch	·	2.4 km	MPC · JPL
775103	2006 DB_{75}	—	February 24, 2006	Kitt Peak	Spacewatch	THM	2.0 km	MPC · JPL
775104	2006 DP_{75}	—	January 23, 2006	Kitt Peak	Spacewatch	EUN	890 m	MPC · JPL
775105	2006 DU_{90}	—	February 24, 2006	Kitt Peak	Spacewatch	·	1.4 km	MPC · JPL
775106	2006 DV_{128}	—	February 25, 2006	Kitt Peak	Spacewatch	·	1.8 km	MPC · JPL
775107	2006 DY_{134}	—	January 31, 2006	Kitt Peak	Spacewatch	·	1.5 km	MPC · JPL
775108	2006 DG_{140}	—	February 25, 2006	Kitt Peak	Spacewatch	·	1.4 km	MPC · JPL
775109	2006 DP_{143}	—	February 25, 2006	Mount Lemmon	Mount Lemmon Survey	·	1.8 km	MPC · JPL
775110	2006 DD_{144}	—	February 25, 2006	Mount Lemmon	Mount Lemmon Survey	·	1.8 km	MPC · JPL
775111	2006 DJ_{147}	—	February 25, 2006	Mount Lemmon	Mount Lemmon Survey	AGN	850 m	MPC · JPL
775112	2006 DP_{166}	—	December 3, 2005	Mauna Kea	A. Boattini	·	1.4 km	MPC · JPL
775113	2006 DE_{172}	—	February 27, 2006	Kitt Peak	Spacewatch	·	1.3 km	MPC · JPL
775114	2006 DO_{173}	—	February 27, 2006	Kitt Peak	Spacewatch	KOR	960 m	MPC · JPL
775115	2006 DL_{174}	—	February 27, 2006	Kitt Peak	Spacewatch	·	750 m	MPC · JPL
775116	2006 DH_{194}	—	February 28, 2006	Mount Lemmon	Mount Lemmon Survey	HOF	1.8 km	MPC · JPL
775117	2006 DB_{195}	—	October 7, 2004	Kitt Peak	Spacewatch	·	930 m	MPC · JPL
775118	2006 DT_{219}	—	February 25, 2006	Mount Lemmon	Mount Lemmon Survey	(5)	860 m	MPC · JPL
775119	2006 DP_{221}	—	July 24, 2015	Haleakala	Pan-STARRS 1	·	950 m	MPC · JPL
775120	2006 DN_{222}	—	September 15, 2013	Haleakala	Pan-STARRS 1	·	1.5 km	MPC · JPL
775121	2006 DZ_{223}	—	July 14, 2013	Haleakala	Pan-STARRS 1	EOS	1.2 km	MPC · JPL
775122	2006 DD_{227}	—	February 24, 2006	Kitt Peak	Spacewatch	·	2.4 km	MPC · JPL
775123	2006 DJ_{227}	—	February 21, 2006	Mount Lemmon	Mount Lemmon Survey	·	1.4 km	MPC · JPL
775124	2006 DN_{227}	—	February 25, 2006	Kitt Peak	Spacewatch	·	1.5 km	MPC · JPL
775125	2006 EP_{4}	—	March 2, 2006	Kitt Peak	Spacewatch	·	1.5 km	MPC · JPL
775126	2006 ED_{7}	—	March 2, 2006	Kitt Peak	Spacewatch	·	1.7 km	MPC · JPL
775127	2006 EY_{21}	—	March 3, 2006	Kitt Peak	Spacewatch	·	1.5 km	MPC · JPL
775128	2006 EB_{35}	—	March 3, 2006	Kitt Peak	Spacewatch	·	1.7 km	MPC · JPL
775129	2006 EO_{43}	—	November 9, 1999	Kitt Peak	Spacewatch	·	1.2 km	MPC · JPL
775130	2006 EY_{47}	—	March 4, 2006	Kitt Peak	Spacewatch	·	1.7 km	MPC · JPL
775131	2006 ET_{50}	—	March 4, 2006	Kitt Peak	Spacewatch	·	920 m	MPC · JPL
775132	2006 EJ_{61}	—	March 5, 2006	Kitt Peak	Spacewatch	·	820 m	MPC · JPL
775133	2006 EQ_{69}	—	March 3, 2006	Kitt Peak	Spacewatch	AGN	930 m	MPC · JPL
775134	2006 EA_{70}	—	August 31, 2017	Haleakala	Pan-STARRS 1	·	1.2 km	MPC · JPL
775135	2006 EE_{80}	—	May 21, 2015	Haleakala	Pan-STARRS 1	MIS	1.6 km	MPC · JPL
775136	2006 EM_{80}	—	January 28, 2017	Haleakala	Pan-STARRS 1	L5	6.1 km	MPC · JPL
775137	2006 EL_{81}	—	April 26, 2017	Haleakala	Pan-STARRS 1	·	1.8 km	MPC · JPL
775138	2006 EA_{82}	—	March 2, 2006	Kitt Peak	Spacewatch	·	1.2 km	MPC · JPL
775139	2006 EZ_{82}	—	March 2, 2006	Kitt Peak	Spacewatch	·	1.2 km	MPC · JPL
775140	2006 FK_{12}	—	March 23, 2006	Kitt Peak	Spacewatch	EUN	990 m	MPC · JPL
775141	2006 FX_{12}	—	March 23, 2006	Kitt Peak	Spacewatch	·	1.1 km	MPC · JPL
775142	2006 FH_{27}	—	March 24, 2006	Mount Lemmon	Mount Lemmon Survey	·	1.2 km	MPC · JPL
775143	2006 FO_{55}	—	March 18, 2017	Kitt Peak	Spacewatch	·	2.1 km	MPC · JPL
775144	2006 FR_{57}	—	March 6, 2006	Kitt Peak	Spacewatch	·	850 m	MPC · JPL
775145	2006 FC_{59}	—	May 21, 2015	Haleakala	Pan-STARRS 1	·	900 m	MPC · JPL
775146	2006 FQ_{60}	—	March 24, 2006	Mount Lemmon	Mount Lemmon Survey	·	1.8 km	MPC · JPL
775147	2006 GS_{6}	—	April 2, 2006	Kitt Peak	Spacewatch	·	900 m	MPC · JPL
775148	2006 GC_{49}	—	April 1, 2006	Siding Spring	SSS	·	1.5 km	MPC · JPL
775149	2006 HF_{14}	—	April 19, 2006	Mount Lemmon	Mount Lemmon Survey	3:2 · SHU	4.6 km	MPC · JPL
775150	2006 HN_{28}	—	March 5, 2006	Kitt Peak	Spacewatch	THB	2.5 km	MPC · JPL
775151	2006 HA_{37}	—	February 27, 2006	Kitt Peak	Spacewatch	·	2.0 km	MPC · JPL
775152	2006 HZ_{78}	—	April 26, 2006	Kitt Peak	Spacewatch	·	1.8 km	MPC · JPL
775153	2006 HV_{92}	—	April 29, 2006	Kitt Peak	Spacewatch	·	2.0 km	MPC · JPL
775154	2006 HO_{126}	—	April 28, 2006	Cerro Tololo	Deep Ecliptic Survey	KOR	1.0 km	MPC · JPL
775155	2006 HS_{126}	—	April 28, 2006	Cerro Tololo	Deep Ecliptic Survey	·	1.2 km	MPC · JPL
775156	2006 HU_{130}	—	April 26, 2006	Cerro Tololo	Deep Ecliptic Survey	·	1.1 km	MPC · JPL
775157	2006 HL_{131}	—	April 26, 2006	Cerro Tololo	Deep Ecliptic Survey	·	1.9 km	MPC · JPL
775158	2006 HR_{134}	—	April 26, 2006	Cerro Tololo	Deep Ecliptic Survey	KOR	1.0 km	MPC · JPL
775159	2006 HH_{136}	—	April 26, 2006	Cerro Tololo	Deep Ecliptic Survey	·	1.3 km	MPC · JPL
775160	2006 HC_{143}	—	April 27, 2006	Cerro Tololo	Deep Ecliptic Survey	·	740 m	MPC · JPL
775161	2006 HS_{148}	—	April 27, 2006	Cerro Tololo	Deep Ecliptic Survey	KOR	1.1 km	MPC · JPL
775162	2006 HG_{149}	—	April 27, 2006	Cerro Tololo	Deep Ecliptic Survey	KOR	940 m	MPC · JPL
775163	2006 HC_{150}	—	April 27, 2006	Cerro Tololo	Deep Ecliptic Survey	·	2.3 km	MPC · JPL
775164	2006 HT_{157}	—	April 25, 2006	Kitt Peak	Spacewatch	TIR	2.2 km	MPC · JPL
775165	2006 HQ_{158}	—	October 23, 2013	Mount Lemmon	Mount Lemmon Survey	·	1.4 km	MPC · JPL
775166	2006 HY_{159}	—	April 29, 2006	Kitt Peak	Spacewatch	·	1.4 km	MPC · JPL
775167	2006 HG_{160}	—	May 11, 2023	Mount Lemmon	Mount Lemmon Survey	THM	1.9 km	MPC · JPL
775168	2006 JK_{59}	—	May 1, 2006	Kitt Peak	Deep Ecliptic Survey	KOR	960 m	MPC · JPL
775169	2006 JG_{62}	—	May 1, 2006	Kitt Peak	Deep Ecliptic Survey	KOR	1.0 km	MPC · JPL
775170	2006 JF_{64}	—	March 8, 2006	Mount Lemmon	Mount Lemmon Survey	·	980 m	MPC · JPL
775171	2006 JE_{66}	—	May 1, 2006	Kitt Peak	Deep Ecliptic Survey	·	1.4 km	MPC · JPL
775172	2006 JM_{70}	—	April 26, 2006	Cerro Tololo	Deep Ecliptic Survey	·	1.7 km	MPC · JPL
775173	2006 JX_{71}	—	May 1, 2006	Mauna Kea	P. A. Wiegert	·	1.2 km	MPC · JPL
775174	2006 JZ_{71}	—	May 1, 2006	Mauna Kea	P. A. Wiegert	·	1.2 km	MPC · JPL
775175	2006 JK_{72}	—	May 1, 2006	Mauna Kea	P. A. Wiegert	KOR	1.0 km	MPC · JPL
775176	2006 JN_{73}	—	May 1, 2006	Mauna Kea	P. A. Wiegert	·	1.3 km	MPC · JPL
775177	2006 JX_{75}	—	May 6, 2006	Mount Lemmon	Mount Lemmon Survey	·	800 m	MPC · JPL
775178	2006 JY_{76}	—	May 1, 2006	Mauna Kea	P. A. Wiegert	·	1.3 km	MPC · JPL
775179	2006 JB_{77}	—	May 1, 2006	Mauna Kea	P. A. Wiegert	·	1.9 km	MPC · JPL
775180	2006 JD_{77}	—	September 28, 2003	Kitt Peak	Spacewatch	·	860 m	MPC · JPL
775181	2006 JT_{77}	—	May 1, 2006	Mauna Kea	P. A. Wiegert	·	620 m	MPC · JPL
775182	2006 JW_{78}	—	May 1, 2006	Mauna Kea	P. A. Wiegert	EOS	1.2 km	MPC · JPL
775183	2006 JP_{84}	—	October 24, 2013	Mount Lemmon	Mount Lemmon Survey	·	1.5 km	MPC · JPL
775184	2006 JE_{86}	—	April 8, 2006	Kitt Peak	Spacewatch	ARM	2.3 km	MPC · JPL
775185	2006 JS_{86}	—	May 2, 2014	Mount Lemmon	Mount Lemmon Survey	·	770 m	MPC · JPL
775186	2006 JF_{87}	—	April 6, 2010	Mount Lemmon	Mount Lemmon Survey	·	830 m	MPC · JPL
775187	2006 JL_{87}	—	April 5, 2011	Kitt Peak	Spacewatch	·	1.4 km	MPC · JPL
775188	2006 JU_{87}	—	March 29, 2014	Mount Lemmon	Mount Lemmon Survey	·	780 m	MPC · JPL
775189	2006 JG_{89}	—	May 9, 2006	Mount Lemmon	Mount Lemmon Survey	·	1.7 km	MPC · JPL
775190	2006 JC_{91}	—	September 3, 2013	Mount Lemmon	Mount Lemmon Survey	·	2.1 km	MPC · JPL
775191	2006 KR_{8}	—	April 25, 2006	Mount Lemmon	Mount Lemmon Survey	·	1.2 km	MPC · JPL
775192	2006 KQ_{31}	—	May 5, 2006	Kitt Peak	Spacewatch	THM	1.5 km	MPC · JPL
775193	2006 KQ_{51}	—	May 21, 2006	Kitt Peak	Spacewatch	·	2.3 km	MPC · JPL
775194	2006 KJ_{58}	—	May 22, 2006	Kitt Peak	Spacewatch	EOS	1.6 km	MPC · JPL
775195	2006 KP_{59}	—	May 22, 2006	Kitt Peak	Spacewatch	LIX	2.6 km	MPC · JPL
775196	2006 KJ_{60}	—	May 22, 2006	Kitt Peak	Spacewatch	EUN	930 m	MPC · JPL
775197	2006 KD_{75}	—	May 24, 2006	Kitt Peak	Spacewatch	·	1.3 km	MPC · JPL
775198	2006 KM_{95}	—	May 22, 2006	Kitt Peak	Spacewatch	·	1.5 km	MPC · JPL
775199	2006 KF_{97}	—	May 25, 2006	Kitt Peak	Spacewatch	·	1.7 km	MPC · JPL
775200	2006 KQ_{99}	—	May 23, 2006	Kitt Peak	Spacewatch	BAR	1.2 km	MPC · JPL

== 775201–775300 ==
back to top

Designation			Discovery			Properties		Ref
Permanent	Provisional	Named after	Date	Site	Discoverer(s)	Category	Diam.	Ref
775201	2006 KO_{102}	—	May 27, 2006	Kitt Peak	Spacewatch	·	1.2 km	MPC · JPL
775202	2006 KT_{119}	—	May 31, 2006	Kitt Peak	Spacewatch	·	2.3 km	MPC · JPL
775203	2006 KE_{120}	—	May 23, 2006	Kitt Peak	Spacewatch	EOS	1.4 km	MPC · JPL
775204	2006 KH_{124}	—	May 23, 2006	Kitt Peak	Spacewatch	·	2.3 km	MPC · JPL
775205	2006 KR_{132}	—	May 25, 2006	Mauna Kea	P. A. Wiegert	KON	1.6 km	MPC · JPL
775206	2006 KU_{136}	—	May 25, 2006	Mauna Kea	P. A. Wiegert	KOR	920 m	MPC · JPL
775207	2006 KN_{139}	—	May 25, 2006	Mauna Kea	P. A. Wiegert	·	2.1 km	MPC · JPL
775208	2006 KF_{142}	—	May 25, 2006	Mauna Kea	P. A. Wiegert	THM	1.4 km	MPC · JPL
775209	2006 KA_{144}	—	May 20, 2006	Kitt Peak	Spacewatch	THB	2.2 km	MPC · JPL
775210	2006 KJ_{148}	—	March 12, 2016	Haleakala	Pan-STARRS 1	·	2.4 km	MPC · JPL
775211	2006 KW_{150}	—	April 21, 2006	Kitt Peak	Spacewatch	·	2.2 km	MPC · JPL
775212	2006 KJ_{152}	—	April 15, 2010	Kitt Peak	Spacewatch	(5)	920 m	MPC · JPL
775213	2006 KN_{153}	—	February 11, 2016	Haleakala	Pan-STARRS 1	·	1.9 km	MPC · JPL
775214	2006 KU_{153}	—	November 17, 2008	Kitt Peak	Spacewatch	·	2.1 km	MPC · JPL
775215	2006 KE_{154}	—	September 26, 2013	Mount Lemmon	Mount Lemmon Survey	·	2.3 km	MPC · JPL
775216	2006 KT_{154}	—	May 23, 2006	Kitt Peak	Spacewatch	·	1.4 km	MPC · JPL
775217	2006 KX_{154}	—	May 22, 2011	Mount Lemmon	Mount Lemmon Survey	·	1.4 km	MPC · JPL
775218	2006 KC_{155}	—	May 20, 2006	Kitt Peak	Spacewatch	·	1.8 km	MPC · JPL
775219	2006 KQ_{156}	—	May 21, 2006	Kitt Peak	Spacewatch	·	1.2 km	MPC · JPL
775220	2006 KW_{157}	—	May 20, 2006	Kitt Peak	Spacewatch	·	2.1 km	MPC · JPL
775221	2006 LQ_{9}	—	March 7, 2017	Haleakala	Pan-STARRS 1	·	2.5 km	MPC · JPL
775222	2006 MB_{7}	—	May 30, 2006	Mount Lemmon	Mount Lemmon Survey	·	1.0 km	MPC · JPL
775223	2006 MS_{16}	—	February 17, 2017	Haleakala	Pan-STARRS 1	·	1.5 km	MPC · JPL
775224	2006 OH_{6}	—	June 22, 2006	Kitt Peak	Spacewatch	·	1.4 km	MPC · JPL
775225	2006 OR_{22}	—	July 21, 2006	Mount Lemmon	Mount Lemmon Survey	AEO	1.0 km	MPC · JPL
775226	2006 OQ_{25}	—	July 19, 2006	Mauna Kea	P. A. Wiegert, D. Subasinghe	·	1.5 km	MPC · JPL
775227	2006 ON_{29}	—	July 22, 2006	Mount Lemmon	Mount Lemmon Survey	·	1.2 km	MPC · JPL
775228	2006 OR_{29}	—	July 19, 2006	Mauna Kea	P. A. Wiegert, D. Subasinghe	EOS	1.3 km	MPC · JPL
775229	2006 OF_{32}	—	July 21, 2006	Mount Lemmon	Mount Lemmon Survey	·	1.7 km	MPC · JPL
775230	2006 OC_{34}	—	July 19, 2006	Mauna Kea	P. A. Wiegert, D. Subasinghe	L4	5.9 km	MPC · JPL
775231	2006 OX_{34}	—	July 19, 2006	Mauna Kea	P. A. Wiegert, D. Subasinghe	L4	6.1 km	MPC · JPL
775232	2006 OO_{36}	—	July 19, 2006	Mauna Kea	P. A. Wiegert, D. Subasinghe	L4	5.8 km	MPC · JPL
775233	2006 OY_{40}	—	November 26, 2019	Mount Lemmon	Mount Lemmon Survey	EUN	700 m	MPC · JPL
775234	2006 PZ_{33}	—	May 26, 2006	Mount Lemmon	Mount Lemmon Survey	·	870 m	MPC · JPL
775235	2006 QA_{4}	—	August 18, 2006	Kitt Peak	Spacewatch	·	1.2 km	MPC · JPL
775236	2006 QY_{14}	—	July 21, 2006	Mount Lemmon	Mount Lemmon Survey	(5)	930 m	MPC · JPL
775237	2006 QA_{69}	—	August 21, 2006	Kitt Peak	Spacewatch	·	1.0 km	MPC · JPL
775238	2006 QD_{73}	—	August 21, 2006	Kitt Peak	Spacewatch	MAR	780 m	MPC · JPL
775239	2006 QE_{74}	—	August 21, 2006	Kitt Peak	Spacewatch	·	1.5 km	MPC · JPL
775240	2006 QL_{75}	—	August 21, 2006	Kitt Peak	Spacewatch	·	1.2 km	MPC · JPL
775241	2006 QY_{129}	—	May 26, 2006	Mount Lemmon	Mount Lemmon Survey	(1547)	1.3 km	MPC · JPL
775242	2006 QF_{131}	—	August 21, 2006	Tucson	R. A. Tucker	·	1.6 km	MPC · JPL
775243	2006 QX_{151}	—	August 19, 2006	Kitt Peak	Spacewatch	·	990 m	MPC · JPL
775244	2006 QM_{171}	—	August 22, 2006	Cerro Tololo	Deep Ecliptic Survey	·	920 m	MPC · JPL
775245	2006 QB_{177}	—	August 19, 2006	Kitt Peak	Spacewatch	·	990 m	MPC · JPL
775246	2006 QC_{177}	—	August 19, 2006	Kitt Peak	Spacewatch	EUN	790 m	MPC · JPL
775247	2006 QD_{192}	—	October 10, 2012	Haleakala	Pan-STARRS 1	EOS	1.4 km	MPC · JPL
775248	2006 QG_{192}	—	November 7, 2012	Mount Lemmon	Mount Lemmon Survey	·	1.7 km	MPC · JPL
775249	2006 QV_{192}	—	February 20, 2014	Mount Lemmon	Mount Lemmon Survey	EOS	1.3 km	MPC · JPL
775250	2006 QF_{195}	—	August 21, 2006	Kitt Peak	Spacewatch	·	1.1 km	MPC · JPL
775251	2006 QK_{195}	—	November 21, 2015	Mount Lemmon	Mount Lemmon Survey	·	950 m	MPC · JPL
775252	2006 QT_{195}	—	October 11, 2015	Mount Lemmon	Mount Lemmon Survey	·	1.1 km	MPC · JPL
775253	2006 QZ_{195}	—	January 30, 2012	Kitt Peak	Spacewatch	JUN	620 m	MPC · JPL
775254	2006 QE_{196}	—	December 30, 2013	Mount Lemmon	Mount Lemmon Survey	EOS	1.4 km	MPC · JPL
775255	2006 QP_{196}	—	August 19, 2006	Kitt Peak	Spacewatch	·	1.4 km	MPC · JPL
775256	2006 QY_{196}	—	August 29, 2006	Kitt Peak	Spacewatch	·	1.1 km	MPC · JPL
775257	2006 QA_{197}	—	January 25, 2014	Haleakala	Pan-STARRS 1	EOS	1.4 km	MPC · JPL
775258	2006 QJ_{197}	—	August 28, 2006	Catalina	CSS	(5)	1 km	MPC · JPL
775259	2006 QO_{197}	—	August 27, 2006	Kitt Peak	Spacewatch	·	800 m	MPC · JPL
775260	2006 QR_{197}	—	August 29, 2006	Kitt Peak	Spacewatch	·	1.4 km	MPC · JPL
775261	2006 QK_{198}	—	May 7, 2014	Haleakala	Pan-STARRS 1	·	1.4 km	MPC · JPL
775262	2006 QU_{198}	—	August 27, 2006	Kitt Peak	Spacewatch	(29841)	1.1 km	MPC · JPL
775263	2006 QM_{199}	—	February 27, 2014	Mount Lemmon	Mount Lemmon Survey	·	2.0 km	MPC · JPL
775264	2006 QP_{199}	—	October 16, 2015	Kitt Peak	Spacewatch	·	1.0 km	MPC · JPL
775265	2006 QU_{200}	—	February 7, 2008	Mount Lemmon	Mount Lemmon Survey	·	990 m	MPC · JPL
775266	2006 QW_{200}	—	March 19, 2017	Haleakala	Pan-STARRS 1	MAR	780 m	MPC · JPL
775267	2006 QO_{201}	—	May 19, 2018	Haleakala	Pan-STARRS 1	·	1.1 km	MPC · JPL
775268	2006 QF_{206}	—	August 28, 2006	Kitt Peak	Spacewatch	HNS	650 m	MPC · JPL
775269	2006 QE_{207}	—	August 29, 2006	Kitt Peak	Spacewatch	·	1.6 km	MPC · JPL
775270	2006 QO_{208}	—	August 19, 2006	Kitt Peak	Spacewatch	·	1.5 km	MPC · JPL
775271	2006 QS_{208}	—	August 28, 2006	Kitt Peak	Spacewatch	·	1.9 km	MPC · JPL
775272	2006 QE_{209}	—	August 28, 2006	Kitt Peak	Spacewatch	·	2.2 km	MPC · JPL
775273	2006 QQ_{210}	—	August 27, 2006	Kitt Peak	Spacewatch	·	2.5 km	MPC · JPL
775274	2006 RF_{24}	—	August 29, 2006	Catalina	CSS	·	2.5 km	MPC · JPL
775275	2006 RL_{36}	—	September 15, 2006	Socorro	LINEAR	·	2.9 km	MPC · JPL
775276	2006 RM_{37}	—	September 12, 2006	Catalina	CSS	·	1.2 km	MPC · JPL
775277	2006 RF_{50}	—	September 14, 2006	Kitt Peak	Spacewatch	·	1.2 km	MPC · JPL
775278	2006 RX_{57}	—	July 21, 2006	Mount Lemmon	Mount Lemmon Survey	T_{j} (2.97) · 3:2 · (6124)	4.2 km	MPC · JPL
775279	2006 RE_{69}	—	September 15, 2006	Kitt Peak	Spacewatch	·	870 m	MPC · JPL
775280	2006 RW_{70}	—	September 15, 2006	Kitt Peak	Spacewatch	3:2 · SHU	3.8 km	MPC · JPL
775281	2006 RG_{73}	—	September 15, 2006	Kitt Peak	Spacewatch	·	2.2 km	MPC · JPL
775282	2006 RX_{80}	—	September 15, 2006	Kitt Peak	Spacewatch	·	2.6 km	MPC · JPL
775283	2006 RT_{83}	—	September 15, 2006	Kitt Peak	Spacewatch	·	2.4 km	MPC · JPL
775284	2006 RP_{101}	—	September 14, 2006	Catalina	CSS	·	2.3 km	MPC · JPL
775285	2006 RO_{108}	—	September 14, 2006	Mauna Kea	Masiero, J., R. Jedicke	·	1.0 km	MPC · JPL
775286	2006 RR_{108}	—	September 14, 2006	Mauna Kea	Masiero, J., R. Jedicke	·	1.0 km	MPC · JPL
775287	2006 RJ_{109}	—	September 14, 2006	Mauna Kea	Masiero, J., R. Jedicke	·	1.9 km	MPC · JPL
775288	2006 RF_{113}	—	September 26, 2006	Mount Lemmon	Mount Lemmon Survey	EOS	1.3 km	MPC · JPL
775289	2006 RS_{114}	—	October 2, 2006	Kitt Peak	Spacewatch	·	940 m	MPC · JPL
775290	2006 RL_{117}	—	September 14, 2006	Mauna Kea	Masiero, J., R. Jedicke	·	1.7 km	MPC · JPL
775291	2006 RT_{120}	—	September 15, 2006	Kitt Peak	Spacewatch	·	1.8 km	MPC · JPL
775292	2006 RN_{122}	—	September 15, 2006	Kitt Peak	Spacewatch	·	1.3 km	MPC · JPL
775293	2006 RX_{123}	—	September 15, 2006	Kitt Peak	Spacewatch	·	1.8 km	MPC · JPL
775294	2006 RG_{124}	—	September 14, 2006	Kitt Peak	Spacewatch	(5)	1.1 km	MPC · JPL
775295	2006 RL_{126}	—	September 15, 2006	Kitt Peak	Spacewatch	·	1.5 km	MPC · JPL
775296	2006 RM_{127}	—	September 15, 2006	Kitt Peak	Spacewatch	·	1.9 km	MPC · JPL
775297	2006 RO_{127}	—	September 15, 2006	Kitt Peak	Spacewatch	VER	1.9 km	MPC · JPL
775298	2006 RU_{127}	—	September 15, 2006	Kitt Peak	Spacewatch	·	1.2 km	MPC · JPL
775299	2006 SS_{16}	—	September 17, 2006	Kitt Peak	Spacewatch	EUN	820 m	MPC · JPL
775300	2006 SC_{18}	—	September 17, 2006	Kitt Peak	Spacewatch	·	1.8 km	MPC · JPL

== 775301–775400 ==
back to top

Designation			Discovery			Properties		Ref
Permanent	Provisional	Named after	Date	Site	Discoverer(s)	Category	Diam.	Ref
775301	2006 SK_{30}	—	August 29, 2006	Kitt Peak	Spacewatch	·	1.4 km	MPC · JPL
775302	2006 SD_{35}	—	September 17, 2006	Kitt Peak	Spacewatch	·	1.1 km	MPC · JPL
775303	2006 SL_{45}	—	September 18, 2006	Kitt Peak	Spacewatch	·	1.2 km	MPC · JPL
775304	2006 SQ_{45}	—	September 18, 2006	Catalina	CSS	·	2.6 km	MPC · JPL
775305	2006 SV_{47}	—	September 19, 2006	Catalina	CSS	·	1.3 km	MPC · JPL
775306	2006 SS_{60}	—	September 18, 2006	Catalina	CSS	·	2.8 km	MPC · JPL
775307	2006 ST_{68}	—	September 19, 2006	Kitt Peak	Spacewatch	·	2.1 km	MPC · JPL
775308	2006 SA_{77}	—	September 19, 2006	Catalina	CSS	·	2.3 km	MPC · JPL
775309	2006 SM_{86}	—	September 18, 2006	Kitt Peak	Spacewatch	·	860 m	MPC · JPL
775310	2006 SE_{89}	—	September 18, 2006	Kitt Peak	Spacewatch	·	2.4 km	MPC · JPL
775311	2006 SF_{101}	—	September 19, 2006	Kitt Peak	Spacewatch	·	1.1 km	MPC · JPL
775312	2006 SK_{102}	—	September 19, 2006	Kitt Peak	Spacewatch	·	1.8 km	MPC · JPL
775313	2006 SV_{113}	—	September 23, 2006	Kitt Peak	Spacewatch	·	1.1 km	MPC · JPL
775314	2006 SL_{114}	—	September 23, 2006	Kitt Peak	Spacewatch	·	930 m	MPC · JPL
775315	2006 SM_{118}	—	September 24, 2006	Kitt Peak	Spacewatch	·	880 m	MPC · JPL
775316	2006 SG_{134}	—	September 23, 2006	Kitt Peak	Spacewatch	·	2.2 km	MPC · JPL
775317	2006 SB_{138}	—	September 20, 2006	Catalina	CSS	·	1.2 km	MPC · JPL
775318	2006 SA_{144}	—	September 19, 2006	Kitt Peak	Spacewatch	·	990 m	MPC · JPL
775319	2006 SF_{144}	—	September 19, 2006	Kitt Peak	Spacewatch	AGN	870 m	MPC · JPL
775320	2006 SY_{144}	—	September 19, 2006	Kitt Peak	Spacewatch	KOR	920 m	MPC · JPL
775321	2006 SZ_{146}	—	September 19, 2006	Kitt Peak	Spacewatch	MIS	1.9 km	MPC · JPL
775322	2006 SU_{148}	—	September 19, 2006	Kitt Peak	Spacewatch	·	1.0 km	MPC · JPL
775323	2006 SK_{149}	—	September 19, 2006	Kitt Peak	Spacewatch	·	800 m	MPC · JPL
775324	2006 SG_{169}	—	September 25, 2006	Kitt Peak	Spacewatch	·	730 m	MPC · JPL
775325	2006 SY_{169}	—	September 25, 2006	Kitt Peak	Spacewatch	·	1.2 km	MPC · JPL
775326	2006 SB_{172}	—	September 25, 2006	Kitt Peak	Spacewatch	·	1.7 km	MPC · JPL
775327	2006 SL_{172}	—	September 17, 2006	Kitt Peak	Spacewatch	·	920 m	MPC · JPL
775328	2006 SM_{172}	—	September 17, 2006	Kitt Peak	Spacewatch	·	2.2 km	MPC · JPL
775329	2006 SM_{174}	—	September 25, 2006	Socorro	LINEAR	·	990 m	MPC · JPL
775330	2006 SL_{189}	—	September 26, 2006	Kitt Peak	Spacewatch	·	1.8 km	MPC · JPL
775331	2006 SR_{190}	—	September 26, 2006	Mount Lemmon	Mount Lemmon Survey	THM	2.0 km	MPC · JPL
775332	2006 ST_{190}	—	September 26, 2006	Mount Lemmon	Mount Lemmon Survey	(12739)	1.1 km	MPC · JPL
775333	2006 SN_{191}	—	September 19, 2006	Kitt Peak	Spacewatch	EOS	1.3 km	MPC · JPL
775334	2006 SU_{192}	—	September 26, 2006	Mount Lemmon	Mount Lemmon Survey	·	1.8 km	MPC · JPL
775335	2006 SD_{193}	—	September 26, 2006	Mount Lemmon	Mount Lemmon Survey	·	1.5 km	MPC · JPL
775336	2006 SV_{195}	—	September 18, 2006	Kitt Peak	Spacewatch	EOS	1.2 km	MPC · JPL
775337	2006 SA_{196}	—	September 19, 2006	Kitt Peak	Spacewatch	·	1.8 km	MPC · JPL
775338	2006 ST_{219}	—	September 23, 2006	Moletai	K. Černis, Zdanavicius, J.	·	2.5 km	MPC · JPL
775339	2006 SE_{221}	—	August 21, 2006	Kitt Peak	Spacewatch	·	2.2 km	MPC · JPL
775340	2006 SH_{222}	—	September 25, 2006	Kitt Peak	Spacewatch	·	1.4 km	MPC · JPL
775341	2006 SH_{226}	—	September 26, 2006	Kitt Peak	Spacewatch	·	1.2 km	MPC · JPL
775342	2006 SC_{230}	—	September 17, 2006	Kitt Peak	Spacewatch	·	1.5 km	MPC · JPL
775343	2006 SD_{230}	—	September 26, 2006	Kitt Peak	Spacewatch	·	1.1 km	MPC · JPL
775344	2006 SL_{231}	—	September 26, 2006	Kitt Peak	Spacewatch	·	1.3 km	MPC · JPL
775345	2006 SM_{232}	—	September 26, 2006	Kitt Peak	Spacewatch	·	860 m	MPC · JPL
775346	2006 SO_{237}	—	March 15, 2013	Kitt Peak	Spacewatch	EUN	930 m	MPC · JPL
775347	2006 SO_{238}	—	September 26, 2006	Kitt Peak	Spacewatch	HYG	1.5 km	MPC · JPL
775348	2006 SX_{241}	—	August 18, 2006	Kitt Peak	Spacewatch	·	1.8 km	MPC · JPL
775349	2006 SO_{242}	—	September 26, 2006	Kitt Peak	Spacewatch	·	1.9 km	MPC · JPL
775350	2006 SJ_{243}	—	September 26, 2006	Kitt Peak	Spacewatch	EUN	850 m	MPC · JPL
775351	2006 SC_{250}	—	September 17, 2006	Kitt Peak	Spacewatch	·	2.5 km	MPC · JPL
775352	2006 SZ_{260}	—	September 26, 2006	Kitt Peak	Spacewatch	·	1.0 km	MPC · JPL
775353	2006 SK_{271}	—	September 19, 2006	Kitt Peak	Spacewatch	·	1.5 km	MPC · JPL
775354	2006 SJ_{273}	—	September 27, 2006	Mount Lemmon	Mount Lemmon Survey	·	2.4 km	MPC · JPL
775355	2006 SZ_{277}	—	September 28, 2006	Mount Lemmon	Mount Lemmon Survey	·	2.1 km	MPC · JPL
775356	2006 SP_{300}	—	September 26, 2006	Kitt Peak	Spacewatch	·	1.1 km	MPC · JPL
775357	2006 SU_{300}	—	September 26, 2006	Kitt Peak	Spacewatch	·	2.1 km	MPC · JPL
775358	2006 SE_{306}	—	September 27, 2006	Kitt Peak	Spacewatch	·	1.7 km	MPC · JPL
775359	2006 ST_{312}	—	September 27, 2006	Kitt Peak	Spacewatch	·	1.9 km	MPC · JPL
775360	2006 ST_{316}	—	September 27, 2006	Kitt Peak	Spacewatch	·	1.0 km	MPC · JPL
775361	2006 SQ_{320}	—	September 27, 2006	Kitt Peak	Spacewatch	·	2.1 km	MPC · JPL
775362	2006 SN_{321}	—	September 27, 2006	Kitt Peak	Spacewatch	EUN	900 m	MPC · JPL
775363	2006 SA_{322}	—	September 14, 2006	Kitt Peak	Spacewatch	·	1.2 km	MPC · JPL
775364	2006 SG_{339}	—	October 15, 2012	Mount Lemmon	Mount Lemmon Survey	·	2.2 km	MPC · JPL
775365	2006 SL_{341}	—	September 14, 2006	Kitt Peak	Spacewatch	·	1.1 km	MPC · JPL
775366	2006 SV_{342}	—	September 28, 2006	Kitt Peak	Spacewatch	·	2.1 km	MPC · JPL
775367	2006 SK_{346}	—	September 28, 2006	Kitt Peak	Spacewatch	·	950 m	MPC · JPL
775368	2006 SO_{348}	—	September 24, 2006	Kitt Peak	Spacewatch	·	1.1 km	MPC · JPL
775369	2006 SA_{349}	—	September 28, 2006	Kitt Peak	Spacewatch	·	860 m	MPC · JPL
775370	2006 SS_{375}	—	September 17, 2006	Apache Point	SDSS Collaboration	·	2.4 km	MPC · JPL
775371	2006 SA_{377}	—	September 17, 2006	Apache Point	SDSS Collaboration	·	1.6 km	MPC · JPL
775372	2006 SP_{379}	—	September 12, 2006	Apache Point	SDSS Collaboration	HOF	1.8 km	MPC · JPL
775373	2006 SG_{381}	—	September 26, 2006	Mount Lemmon	Mount Lemmon Survey	·	1.8 km	MPC · JPL
775374	2006 SY_{383}	—	September 29, 2006	Apache Point	SDSS Collaboration	·	2.3 km	MPC · JPL
775375	2006 SE_{384}	—	September 29, 2006	Apache Point	SDSS Collaboration	·	1.0 km	MPC · JPL
775376	2006 SL_{384}	—	September 11, 2006	Apache Point	SDSS Collaboration	·	1.9 km	MPC · JPL
775377	2006 SH_{388}	—	September 19, 2006	Apache Point	SDSS Collaboration	·	1.8 km	MPC · JPL
775378	2006 SS_{395}	—	September 17, 2006	Mauna Kea	Masiero, J., R. Jedicke	·	1.8 km	MPC · JPL
775379	2006 SO_{400}	—	September 25, 2006	Kitt Peak	Spacewatch	·	1.3 km	MPC · JPL
775380	2006 SD_{402}	—	September 17, 2006	Kitt Peak	Spacewatch	·	1.0 km	MPC · JPL
775381	2006 SF_{404}	—	September 30, 2006	Mount Lemmon	Mount Lemmon Survey	·	1.1 km	MPC · JPL
775382	2006 SU_{410}	—	September 19, 2006	Kitt Peak	Spacewatch	·	1.3 km	MPC · JPL
775383	2006 SA_{414}	—	September 22, 2006	Apache Point	SDSS Collaboration	VER	1.9 km	MPC · JPL
775384	2006 SQ_{415}	—	September 19, 2006	Kitt Peak	Spacewatch	·	1.8 km	MPC · JPL
775385	2006 SB_{420}	—	January 28, 2015	Haleakala	Pan-STARRS 1	·	2.0 km	MPC · JPL
775386	2006 SB_{421}	—	March 29, 2014	Mount Lemmon	Mount Lemmon Survey	·	1.3 km	MPC · JPL
775387	2006 SU_{421}	—	September 18, 2006	Mauna Kea	P. A. Wiegert	·	1.8 km	MPC · JPL
775388	2006 SW_{423}	—	September 28, 2006	Catalina	CSS	·	1.1 km	MPC · JPL
775389	2006 SX_{428}	—	February 11, 2014	Mount Lemmon	Mount Lemmon Survey	·	2.8 km	MPC · JPL
775390	2006 SJ_{430}	—	October 20, 2012	Kitt Peak	Spacewatch	·	1.9 km	MPC · JPL
775391	2006 SZ_{430}	—	September 25, 2006	Mount Lemmon	Mount Lemmon Survey	EOS	1.4 km	MPC · JPL
775392	2006 SH_{431}	—	January 25, 2012	Haleakala	Pan-STARRS 1	·	940 m	MPC · JPL
775393	2006 SZ_{432}	—	September 25, 2006	Catalina	CSS	·	1.3 km	MPC · JPL
775394	2006 SE_{434}	—	September 27, 2006	Catalina	CSS	(1547)	1.3 km	MPC · JPL
775395	2006 SK_{434}	—	January 19, 2008	Mount Lemmon	Mount Lemmon Survey	·	1.2 km	MPC · JPL
775396	2006 SU_{434}	—	January 2, 2012	Mount Lemmon	Mount Lemmon Survey	·	980 m	MPC · JPL
775397	2006 SY_{434}	—	September 15, 2006	Kitt Peak	Spacewatch	·	1.1 km	MPC · JPL
775398	2006 SM_{435}	—	September 16, 2006	Catalina	CSS	·	1.2 km	MPC · JPL
775399	2006 SY_{435}	—	September 27, 2006	Kitt Peak	Spacewatch	·	1.2 km	MPC · JPL
775400	2006 SC_{436}	—	December 14, 2015	Haleakala	Pan-STARRS 1	·	1.1 km	MPC · JPL

== 775401–775500 ==
back to top

Designation			Discovery			Properties		Ref
Permanent	Provisional	Named after	Date	Site	Discoverer(s)	Category	Diam.	Ref
775401	2006 SX_{436}	—	September 17, 2006	Kitt Peak	Spacewatch	·	2.2 km	MPC · JPL
775402	2006 SC_{437}	—	August 18, 2006	Kitt Peak	Spacewatch	·	1.2 km	MPC · JPL
775403	2006 SJ_{437}	—	February 28, 2008	Kitt Peak	Spacewatch	·	1.2 km	MPC · JPL
775404	2006 SC_{438}	—	May 6, 2014	Haleakala	Pan-STARRS 1	·	1.2 km	MPC · JPL
775405	2006 SE_{438}	—	September 25, 2006	Moletai	K. Černis, Zdanavicius, J.	TIR	2.3 km	MPC · JPL
775406	2006 SF_{438}	—	February 20, 2009	Kitt Peak	Spacewatch	·	750 m	MPC · JPL
775407	2006 SJ_{438}	—	August 31, 2017	Haleakala	Pan-STARRS 1	TIR	2.0 km	MPC · JPL
775408	2006 SO_{438}	—	January 19, 2012	Haleakala	Pan-STARRS 1	·	1.3 km	MPC · JPL
775409	2006 SQ_{438}	—	September 16, 2006	Catalina	CSS	·	1.3 km	MPC · JPL
775410	2006 SJ_{440}	—	September 12, 2015	Haleakala	Pan-STARRS 1	·	1.2 km	MPC · JPL
775411	2006 SY_{442}	—	March 13, 2013	Mount Lemmon	Mount Lemmon Survey	·	1.2 km	MPC · JPL
775412	2006 SE_{443}	—	September 20, 2006	Kitt Peak	Spacewatch	·	2.1 km	MPC · JPL
775413	2006 SJ_{443}	—	September 17, 2006	Catalina	CSS	·	1.2 km	MPC · JPL
775414	2006 SJ_{444}	—	December 18, 2015	Mount Lemmon	Mount Lemmon Survey	·	940 m	MPC · JPL
775415	2006 SP_{444}	—	September 30, 2006	Catalina	CSS	·	1.0 km	MPC · JPL
775416	2006 SX_{444}	—	March 5, 2013	Haleakala	Pan-STARRS 1	·	1.4 km	MPC · JPL
775417	2006 SJ_{445}	—	July 28, 2014	Haleakala	Pan-STARRS 1	·	850 m	MPC · JPL
775418	2006 SP_{445}	—	September 25, 2006	Kitt Peak	Spacewatch	·	1.6 km	MPC · JPL
775419	2006 SW_{445}	—	September 28, 2006	Mount Lemmon	Mount Lemmon Survey	·	900 m	MPC · JPL
775420	2006 SF_{446}	—	September 26, 2006	Mount Lemmon	Mount Lemmon Survey	·	1.3 km	MPC · JPL
775421	2006 SL_{446}	—	September 16, 2006	Catalina	CSS	EUN	950 m	MPC · JPL
775422	2006 SU_{446}	—	September 28, 2006	Kitt Peak	Spacewatch	·	1.3 km	MPC · JPL
775423	2006 SF_{447}	—	September 19, 2006	Kitt Peak	Spacewatch	·	2.0 km	MPC · JPL
775424	2006 SM_{447}	—	September 19, 2006	Kitt Peak	Spacewatch	·	1.8 km	MPC · JPL
775425	2006 ST_{447}	—	September 19, 2006	Kitt Peak	Spacewatch	·	1.8 km	MPC · JPL
775426	2006 SE_{448}	—	September 26, 2006	Kitt Peak	Spacewatch	·	1.0 km	MPC · JPL
775427	2006 SG_{448}	—	September 18, 2006	Kitt Peak	Spacewatch	·	2.7 km	MPC · JPL
775428	2006 SP_{448}	—	September 18, 2006	Kitt Peak	Spacewatch	EOS	1.3 km	MPC · JPL
775429	2006 SX_{450}	—	September 17, 2006	Kitt Peak	Spacewatch	·	1.6 km	MPC · JPL
775430	2006 SG_{451}	—	September 17, 2006	Kitt Peak	Spacewatch	·	1.5 km	MPC · JPL
775431	2006 SC_{453}	—	September 30, 2006	Mount Lemmon	Mount Lemmon Survey	·	1.5 km	MPC · JPL
775432	2006 SY_{453}	—	September 27, 2006	Mount Lemmon	Mount Lemmon Survey	·	990 m	MPC · JPL
775433	2006 SE_{456}	—	September 19, 2006	Kitt Peak	Spacewatch	·	1.3 km	MPC · JPL
775434	2006 SM_{456}	—	September 28, 2006	Kitt Peak	Spacewatch	·	1.7 km	MPC · JPL
775435	2006 SE_{457}	—	September 28, 2006	Kitt Peak	Spacewatch	·	940 m	MPC · JPL
775436	2006 SV_{462}	—	October 11, 2012	Haleakala	Pan-STARRS 1	·	1.8 km	MPC · JPL
775437	2006 SW_{463}	—	September 25, 2006	Kitt Peak	Spacewatch	·	2.4 km	MPC · JPL
775438	2006 SB_{464}	—	September 27, 2006	Kitt Peak	Spacewatch	·	2.0 km	MPC · JPL
775439	2006 SC_{464}	—	September 26, 2006	Mount Lemmon	Mount Lemmon Survey	·	2.3 km	MPC · JPL
775440	2006 SR_{464}	—	September 30, 2006	Mount Lemmon	Mount Lemmon Survey	THM	1.7 km	MPC · JPL
775441	2006 SW_{464}	—	September 26, 2006	Kitt Peak	Spacewatch	·	830 m	MPC · JPL
775442	2006 TJ_{4}	—	October 2, 2006	Mount Lemmon	Mount Lemmon Survey	·	1.3 km	MPC · JPL
775443	2006 TG_{6}	—	October 3, 2006	Mount Lemmon	Mount Lemmon Survey	ARM	2.6 km	MPC · JPL
775444	2006 TH_{11}	—	October 15, 2006	Piszkéstető	K. Sárneczky, Kuli, Z.	EOS	1.7 km	MPC · JPL
775445	2006 TE_{31}	—	September 30, 2006	Mount Lemmon	Mount Lemmon Survey	HNS	970 m	MPC · JPL
775446	2006 TB_{32}	—	October 12, 2006	Kitt Peak	Spacewatch	THM	1.6 km	MPC · JPL
775447	2006 TG_{33}	—	October 12, 2006	Kitt Peak	Spacewatch	·	1.3 km	MPC · JPL
775448	2006 TE_{40}	—	September 26, 2006	Mount Lemmon	Mount Lemmon Survey	EUN	1 km	MPC · JPL
775449	2006 TN_{61}	—	October 2, 2006	Kitt Peak	Spacewatch	·	2.4 km	MPC · JPL
775450	2006 TA_{102}	—	October 15, 2006	Kitt Peak	Spacewatch	·	1.1 km	MPC · JPL
775451	2006 TK_{108}	—	October 13, 2006	Kitt Peak	Spacewatch	·	970 m	MPC · JPL
775452	2006 TY_{110}	—	October 2, 2006	Mount Lemmon	Mount Lemmon Survey	EOS	1.1 km	MPC · JPL
775453	2006 TK_{112}	—	October 1, 2006	Apache Point	SDSS Collaboration	·	1.8 km	MPC · JPL
775454	2006 TW_{118}	—	September 18, 2006	Apache Point	SDSS Collaboration	·	1.9 km	MPC · JPL
775455	2006 TT_{120}	—	October 12, 2006	Apache Point	SDSS Collaboration	·	760 m	MPC · JPL
775456	2006 TT_{122}	—	October 12, 2006	Kitt Peak	Spacewatch	·	2.0 km	MPC · JPL
775457	2006 TC_{131}	—	October 2, 2006	Mount Lemmon	Mount Lemmon Survey	·	1.1 km	MPC · JPL
775458	2006 TO_{134}	—	October 2, 2006	Mount Lemmon	Mount Lemmon Survey	EOS	1.5 km	MPC · JPL
775459	2006 TS_{134}	—	October 2, 2006	Mount Lemmon	Mount Lemmon Survey	·	2.3 km	MPC · JPL
775460	2006 TB_{135}	—	October 2, 2006	Mount Lemmon	Mount Lemmon Survey	EOS	1.3 km	MPC · JPL
775461	2006 TX_{135}	—	October 2, 2006	Mount Lemmon	Mount Lemmon Survey	LIX	2.3 km	MPC · JPL
775462	2006 TP_{136}	—	October 2, 2006	Mount Lemmon	Mount Lemmon Survey	·	2.1 km	MPC · JPL
775463	2006 TS_{136}	—	October 2, 2006	Mount Lemmon	Mount Lemmon Survey	·	840 m	MPC · JPL
775464	2006 TL_{138}	—	August 22, 2014	Haleakala	Pan-STARRS 1	·	1 km	MPC · JPL
775465	2006 TQ_{138}	—	September 23, 2015	Mount Lemmon	Mount Lemmon Survey	·	1.3 km	MPC · JPL
775466	2006 TE_{139}	—	August 24, 2011	Haleakala	Pan-STARRS 1	EOS	1.6 km	MPC · JPL
775467	2006 TQ_{141}	—	October 1, 2006	Piszkéstető	K. Sárneczky	·	1.7 km	MPC · JPL
775468	2006 TZ_{141}	—	October 2, 2006	Mount Lemmon	Mount Lemmon Survey	·	1.1 km	MPC · JPL
775469	2006 TP_{143}	—	October 2, 2006	Kitt Peak	Spacewatch	·	1.6 km	MPC · JPL
775470	2006 TV_{143}	—	October 3, 2006	Mount Lemmon	Mount Lemmon Survey	·	790 m	MPC · JPL
775471	2006 TS_{145}	—	October 2, 2006	Mount Lemmon	Mount Lemmon Survey	·	1.2 km	MPC · JPL
775472	2006 TU_{145}	—	October 2, 2006	Mount Lemmon	Mount Lemmon Survey	·	850 m	MPC · JPL
775473	2006 TO_{146}	—	October 2, 2006	Mount Lemmon	Mount Lemmon Survey	·	2.2 km	MPC · JPL
775474	2006 TT_{147}	—	October 3, 2006	Mount Lemmon	Mount Lemmon Survey	·	1.4 km	MPC · JPL
775475	2006 UA	—	October 16, 2006	Catalina	CSS	APO	340 m	MPC · JPL
775476	2006 UV_{3}	—	September 30, 2006	Mount Lemmon	Mount Lemmon Survey	·	2.6 km	MPC · JPL
775477	2006 UQ_{4}	—	September 27, 2006	Kitt Peak	Spacewatch	·	1 km	MPC · JPL
775478	2006 UT_{5}	—	September 26, 2006	Mount Lemmon	Mount Lemmon Survey	·	1.2 km	MPC · JPL
775479	2006 UJ_{27}	—	October 16, 2006	Kitt Peak	Spacewatch	·	1.0 km	MPC · JPL
775480	2006 UB_{32}	—	October 16, 2006	Kitt Peak	Spacewatch	·	2.1 km	MPC · JPL
775481	2006 UY_{33}	—	October 16, 2006	Kitt Peak	Spacewatch	·	1.0 km	MPC · JPL
775482	2006 UE_{36}	—	October 16, 2006	Kitt Peak	Spacewatch	·	1.0 km	MPC · JPL
775483	2006 UD_{51}	—	September 23, 2006	Kitt Peak	Spacewatch	·	1.2 km	MPC · JPL
775484	2006 UV_{60}	—	October 19, 2006	Mount Lemmon	Mount Lemmon Survey	·	990 m	MPC · JPL
775485	2006 UF_{66}	—	September 17, 2006	Kitt Peak	Spacewatch	·	1.0 km	MPC · JPL
775486	2006 UP_{75}	—	October 2, 2006	Mount Lemmon	Mount Lemmon Survey	EUN	870 m	MPC · JPL
775487	2006 UB_{77}	—	October 17, 2006	Kitt Peak	Spacewatch	T_{j} (2.96)	2.6 km	MPC · JPL
775488	2006 UA_{97}	—	October 2, 2006	Mount Lemmon	Mount Lemmon Survey	·	1.9 km	MPC · JPL
775489	2006 UK_{100}	—	October 18, 2006	Kitt Peak	Spacewatch	·	2.5 km	MPC · JPL
775490	2006 UQ_{102}	—	September 30, 2006	Mount Lemmon	Mount Lemmon Survey	·	2.5 km	MPC · JPL
775491	2006 UX_{103}	—	October 18, 2006	Kitt Peak	Spacewatch	EUN	1.2 km	MPC · JPL
775492	2006 UQ_{104}	—	September 26, 2006	Mount Lemmon	Mount Lemmon Survey	·	1.2 km	MPC · JPL
775493	2006 UJ_{109}	—	October 19, 2006	Kitt Peak	Spacewatch	·	950 m	MPC · JPL
775494	2006 UF_{113}	—	September 24, 2006	Kitt Peak	Spacewatch	LIX	2.3 km	MPC · JPL
775495	2006 UF_{119}	—	October 19, 2006	Kitt Peak	Spacewatch	·	980 m	MPC · JPL
775496	2006 UK_{120}	—	October 11, 2006	Kitt Peak	Spacewatch	·	1.0 km	MPC · JPL
775497	2006 US_{131}	—	October 19, 2006	Kitt Peak	Spacewatch	·	1.9 km	MPC · JPL
775498	2006 UW_{136}	—	October 19, 2006	Mount Lemmon	Mount Lemmon Survey	·	1.9 km	MPC · JPL
775499	2006 UY_{149}	—	October 20, 2006	Catalina	CSS	JUN	610 m	MPC · JPL
775500	2006 UR_{150}	—	October 20, 2006	Mount Lemmon	Mount Lemmon Survey	·	930 m	MPC · JPL

== 775501–775600 ==
back to top

Designation			Discovery			Properties		Ref
Permanent	Provisional	Named after	Date	Site	Discoverer(s)	Category	Diam.	Ref
775501	2006 UR_{155}	—	September 25, 2006	Kitt Peak	Spacewatch	·	1.1 km	MPC · JPL
775502	2006 UP_{159}	—	September 19, 2006	Kitt Peak	Spacewatch	·	2.1 km	MPC · JPL
775503	2006 UQ_{159}	—	October 21, 2006	Mount Lemmon	Mount Lemmon Survey	·	2.1 km	MPC · JPL
775504	2006 UR_{161}	—	October 2, 2006	Mount Lemmon	Mount Lemmon Survey	·	2.3 km	MPC · JPL
775505	2006 UT_{165}	—	October 2, 2006	Mount Lemmon	Mount Lemmon Survey	3:2	4.6 km	MPC · JPL
775506	2006 UF_{166}	—	October 2, 2006	Mount Lemmon	Mount Lemmon Survey	·	1.4 km	MPC · JPL
775507	2006 UC_{169}	—	October 2, 2006	Mount Lemmon	Mount Lemmon Survey	·	1.5 km	MPC · JPL
775508	2006 UE_{171}	—	October 21, 2006	Mount Lemmon	Mount Lemmon Survey	·	2.1 km	MPC · JPL
775509	2006 UD_{187}	—	October 19, 2006	Catalina	CSS	·	2.7 km	MPC · JPL
775510	2006 UB_{194}	—	October 20, 2006	Kitt Peak	Spacewatch	·	2.2 km	MPC · JPL
775511	2006 UN_{198}	—	October 20, 2006	Kitt Peak	Spacewatch	(5)	770 m	MPC · JPL
775512	2006 UL_{205}	—	October 23, 2006	Kitt Peak	Spacewatch	·	1.1 km	MPC · JPL
775513	2006 UN_{205}	—	September 19, 2006	Kitt Peak	Spacewatch	·	1.7 km	MPC · JPL
775514	2006 UQ_{205}	—	October 23, 2006	Kitt Peak	Spacewatch	·	1.5 km	MPC · JPL
775515	2006 UE_{206}	—	September 24, 2006	Kitt Peak	Spacewatch	·	2.1 km	MPC · JPL
775516	2006 UA_{208}	—	October 23, 2006	Kitt Peak	Spacewatch	·	1.0 km	MPC · JPL
775517	2006 UP_{220}	—	September 28, 2006	Kitt Peak	Spacewatch	·	2.2 km	MPC · JPL
775518	2006 UY_{230}	—	September 14, 2006	Kitt Peak	Spacewatch	·	1.2 km	MPC · JPL
775519	2006 UR_{236}	—	October 23, 2006	Kitt Peak	Spacewatch	·	1.7 km	MPC · JPL
775520	2006 UX_{244}	—	September 26, 2006	Mount Lemmon	Mount Lemmon Survey	3:2	4.1 km	MPC · JPL
775521	2006 UM_{245}	—	October 27, 2006	Mount Lemmon	Mount Lemmon Survey	·	1.0 km	MPC · JPL
775522	2006 UX_{245}	—	October 27, 2006	Mount Lemmon	Mount Lemmon Survey	·	1.0 km	MPC · JPL
775523	2006 UC_{247}	—	October 20, 2006	Kitt Peak	Spacewatch	·	1.2 km	MPC · JPL
775524	2006 UF_{248}	—	September 26, 2006	Mount Lemmon	Mount Lemmon Survey	·	840 m	MPC · JPL
775525	2006 UU_{248}	—	October 27, 2006	Mount Lemmon	Mount Lemmon Survey	·	1.8 km	MPC · JPL
775526	2006 UL_{250}	—	October 27, 2006	Mount Lemmon	Mount Lemmon Survey	EUN	730 m	MPC · JPL
775527	2006 UT_{251}	—	October 27, 2006	Mount Lemmon	Mount Lemmon Survey	·	2.0 km	MPC · JPL
775528	2006 UK_{255}	—	October 27, 2006	Mount Lemmon	Mount Lemmon Survey	THM	1.6 km	MPC · JPL
775529	2006 UM_{258}	—	October 28, 2006	Mount Lemmon	Mount Lemmon Survey	·	1.1 km	MPC · JPL
775530	2006 UO_{261}	—	October 28, 2006	Mount Lemmon	Mount Lemmon Survey	·	1.2 km	MPC · JPL
775531	2006 UT_{275}	—	October 28, 2006	Kitt Peak	Spacewatch	·	990 m	MPC · JPL
775532	2006 UU_{276}	—	September 27, 2006	Mount Lemmon	Mount Lemmon Survey	·	1.1 km	MPC · JPL
775533	2006 US_{283}	—	October 20, 2006	Kitt Peak	Spacewatch	·	1.9 km	MPC · JPL
775534	2006 UV_{283}	—	October 20, 2006	Kitt Peak	Spacewatch	·	1.1 km	MPC · JPL
775535	2006 UE_{293}	—	October 19, 2006	Kitt Peak	Deep Ecliptic Survey	·	1.4 km	MPC · JPL
775536	2006 US_{297}	—	October 19, 2006	Kitt Peak	Deep Ecliptic Survey	·	820 m	MPC · JPL
775537	2006 UT_{297}	—	October 19, 2006	Kitt Peak	Deep Ecliptic Survey	·	1.3 km	MPC · JPL
775538	2006 UD_{298}	—	August 27, 2006	Kitt Peak	Spacewatch	HOF	1.9 km	MPC · JPL
775539	2006 UH_{298}	—	September 30, 2006	Mount Lemmon	Mount Lemmon Survey	EOS	1.3 km	MPC · JPL
775540	2006 UW_{299}	—	October 19, 2006	Kitt Peak	Deep Ecliptic Survey	EOS	1.1 km	MPC · JPL
775541	2006 UR_{305}	—	October 19, 2006	Kitt Peak	Deep Ecliptic Survey	KOR	1.0 km	MPC · JPL
775542	2006 UZ_{306}	—	October 19, 2006	Kitt Peak	Deep Ecliptic Survey	THM	1.5 km	MPC · JPL
775543	2006 UD_{309}	—	September 23, 2006	Kitt Peak	Spacewatch	NEM	1.5 km	MPC · JPL
775544	2006 UP_{314}	—	October 19, 2006	Kitt Peak	Deep Ecliptic Survey	·	980 m	MPC · JPL
775545	2006 UW_{315}	—	October 19, 2006	Kitt Peak	Deep Ecliptic Survey	·	2.0 km	MPC · JPL
775546	2006 UB_{319}	—	October 19, 2006	Kitt Peak	Deep Ecliptic Survey	·	1.3 km	MPC · JPL
775547	2006 UT_{319}	—	October 19, 2006	Kitt Peak	Deep Ecliptic Survey	·	2.1 km	MPC · JPL
775548	2006 UW_{323}	—	October 19, 2006	Kitt Peak	Deep Ecliptic Survey	·	1.3 km	MPC · JPL
775549	2006 UE_{324}	—	October 19, 2006	Kitt Peak	Deep Ecliptic Survey	THM	1.6 km	MPC · JPL
775550	2006 UJ_{330}	—	October 16, 2006	Apache Point	SDSS Collaboration	·	1.4 km	MPC · JPL
775551	2006 UH_{333}	—	October 17, 2006	Apache Point	SDSS Collaboration	·	1.9 km	MPC · JPL
775552	2006 UB_{339}	—	November 1, 2006	Kitt Peak	Spacewatch	·	2.3 km	MPC · JPL
775553	2006 UF_{342}	—	October 26, 2006	Mauna Kea	P. A. Wiegert	HOF	1.8 km	MPC · JPL
775554	2006 UV_{346}	—	November 17, 2006	Mount Lemmon	Mount Lemmon Survey	·	2.3 km	MPC · JPL
775555	2006 UV_{347}	—	October 26, 2006	Mauna Kea	P. A. Wiegert	·	1.2 km	MPC · JPL
775556	2006 UV_{352}	—	October 26, 2006	Mauna Kea	P. A. Wiegert	3:2	5.0 km	MPC · JPL
775557	2006 UH_{353}	—	October 26, 2006	Mauna Kea	P. A. Wiegert	THM	1.4 km	MPC · JPL
775558	2006 UR_{357}	—	November 1, 2006	Kitt Peak	Spacewatch	·	890 m	MPC · JPL
775559	2006 UY_{358}	—	October 20, 2006	Kitt Peak	Spacewatch	·	1.3 km	MPC · JPL
775560	2006 UH_{360}	—	October 23, 2006	Kitt Peak	Spacewatch	EOS	1.3 km	MPC · JPL
775561	2006 UW_{365}	—	October 15, 2001	Apache Point	SDSS	·	1.2 km	MPC · JPL
775562	2006 UB_{367}	—	October 15, 2006	Lulin	LUSS	HYG	1.9 km	MPC · JPL
775563	2006 UZ_{367}	—	October 22, 2006	Kitt Peak	Spacewatch	·	1.8 km	MPC · JPL
775564	2006 UN_{368}	—	October 23, 2006	Kitt Peak	Spacewatch	·	2.0 km	MPC · JPL
775565	2006 UV_{369}	—	October 21, 2006	Kitt Peak	Spacewatch	·	1.1 km	MPC · JPL
775566	2006 UO_{370}	—	September 29, 2010	Mount Lemmon	Mount Lemmon Survey	·	930 m	MPC · JPL
775567	2006 UC_{371}	—	October 19, 2006	Catalina	CSS	·	1.4 km	MPC · JPL
775568	2006 UN_{373}	—	October 22, 2006	Kitt Peak	Spacewatch	HNS	720 m	MPC · JPL
775569	2006 US_{375}	—	May 25, 2014	Haleakala	Pan-STARRS 1	·	1.3 km	MPC · JPL
775570	2006 UJ_{376}	—	July 31, 2016	Haleakala	Pan-STARRS 1	EOS	1.1 km	MPC · JPL
775571	2006 UH_{378}	—	December 4, 2012	Mount Lemmon	Mount Lemmon Survey	·	1.7 km	MPC · JPL
775572	2006 UB_{379}	—	December 18, 2015	Mount Lemmon	Mount Lemmon Survey	·	990 m	MPC · JPL
775573	2006 UN_{379}	—	November 24, 2011	Haleakala	Pan-STARRS 1	·	1.1 km	MPC · JPL
775574	2006 UO_{379}	—	October 16, 2006	Bergisch Gladbach	W. Bickel	·	2.2 km	MPC · JPL
775575	2006 UH_{380}	—	August 3, 2014	Haleakala	Pan-STARRS 1	·	1.1 km	MPC · JPL
775576	2006 UR_{380}	—	October 20, 2006	Kitt Peak	Spacewatch	·	900 m	MPC · JPL
775577	2006 UT_{380}	—	September 12, 2015	Haleakala	Pan-STARRS 1	·	1.3 km	MPC · JPL
775578	2006 UG_{381}	—	October 21, 2006	Mount Lemmon	Mount Lemmon Survey	·	2.2 km	MPC · JPL
775579	2006 UP_{381}	—	October 23, 2006	Kitt Peak	Spacewatch	VER	1.8 km	MPC · JPL
775580	2006 UW_{381}	—	October 21, 2006	Kitt Peak	Spacewatch	·	3.2 km	MPC · JPL
775581	2006 UX_{382}	—	October 27, 2006	Mount Lemmon	Mount Lemmon Survey	·	970 m	MPC · JPL
775582	2006 UX_{383}	—	October 22, 2006	Kitt Peak	Spacewatch	·	870 m	MPC · JPL
775583	2006 UY_{384}	—	October 20, 2006	Kitt Peak	Spacewatch	·	2.0 km	MPC · JPL
775584	2006 UA_{385}	—	October 17, 2006	Kitt Peak	Spacewatch	·	2.0 km	MPC · JPL
775585	2006 UC_{385}	—	October 22, 2006	Kitt Peak	Spacewatch	·	2.3 km	MPC · JPL
775586	2006 UP_{385}	—	October 22, 2006	Kitt Peak	Spacewatch	·	1.0 km	MPC · JPL
775587	2006 UJ_{386}	—	October 23, 2006	Kitt Peak	Spacewatch	·	1.2 km	MPC · JPL
775588	2006 UM_{387}	—	October 20, 2006	Kitt Peak	Spacewatch	AGN	840 m	MPC · JPL
775589	2006 UN_{389}	—	October 22, 2006	Kitt Peak	Spacewatch	·	1.2 km	MPC · JPL
775590	2006 UH_{390}	—	October 22, 2006	Mount Lemmon	Mount Lemmon Survey	·	2.0 km	MPC · JPL
775591	2006 UR_{390}	—	October 21, 2006	Kitt Peak	Spacewatch	·	2.3 km	MPC · JPL
775592	2006 UH_{392}	—	October 22, 2006	Mount Lemmon	Mount Lemmon Survey	EOS	1.5 km	MPC · JPL
775593	2006 UX_{394}	—	October 23, 2006	Kitt Peak	Spacewatch	·	2.3 km	MPC · JPL
775594	2006 VM_{4}	—	October 17, 2006	Kitt Peak	Spacewatch	·	690 m	MPC · JPL
775595	2006 VL_{11}	—	November 1, 2006	Kitt Peak	Spacewatch	·	1.4 km	MPC · JPL
775596	2006 VA_{13}	—	November 1, 2006	Catalina	CSS	·	1.6 km	MPC · JPL
775597	2006 VR_{32}	—	September 28, 2006	Mount Lemmon	Mount Lemmon Survey	·	1.2 km	MPC · JPL
775598	2006 VR_{48}	—	October 20, 2006	Catalina	CSS	·	2.7 km	MPC · JPL
775599	2006 VB_{49}	—	November 10, 2006	Kitt Peak	Spacewatch	·	1.1 km	MPC · JPL
775600	2006 VS_{50}	—	November 10, 2006	Kitt Peak	Spacewatch	·	2.5 km	MPC · JPL

== 775601–775700 ==
back to top

Designation			Discovery			Properties		Ref
Permanent	Provisional	Named after	Date	Site	Discoverer(s)	Category	Diam.	Ref
775601	2006 VD_{52}	—	September 27, 2006	Catalina	CSS	·	1.5 km	MPC · JPL
775602	2006 VM_{54}	—	November 11, 2006	Kitt Peak	Spacewatch	·	840 m	MPC · JPL
775603	2006 VG_{71}	—	October 21, 2006	Mount Lemmon	Mount Lemmon Survey	·	1.1 km	MPC · JPL
775604	2006 VH_{84}	—	September 30, 2006	Mount Lemmon	Mount Lemmon Survey	·	2.1 km	MPC · JPL
775605	2006 VT_{97}	—	November 11, 2006	Kitt Peak	Spacewatch	·	920 m	MPC · JPL
775606	2006 VX_{119}	—	October 13, 2006	Kitt Peak	Spacewatch	·	1.1 km	MPC · JPL
775607	2006 VF_{120}	—	October 22, 2006	Mount Lemmon	Mount Lemmon Survey	THB	2.7 km	MPC · JPL
775608	2006 VH_{125}	—	November 14, 2006	Kitt Peak	Spacewatch	(5)	880 m	MPC · JPL
775609	2006 VQ_{127}	—	November 15, 2006	Kitt Peak	Spacewatch	·	1.5 km	MPC · JPL
775610	2006 VY_{128}	—	November 15, 2006	Kitt Peak	Spacewatch	·	1.1 km	MPC · JPL
775611	2006 VR_{129}	—	November 15, 2006	Kitt Peak	Spacewatch	·	1.5 km	MPC · JPL
775612	2006 VB_{131}	—	October 22, 2006	Mount Lemmon	Mount Lemmon Survey	·	2.1 km	MPC · JPL
775613	2006 VN_{133}	—	November 15, 2006	Kitt Peak	Spacewatch	·	890 m	MPC · JPL
775614	2006 VA_{146}	—	October 3, 2006	Mount Lemmon	Mount Lemmon Survey	EUN	920 m	MPC · JPL
775615	2006 VC_{154}	—	September 25, 2006	Mount Lemmon	Mount Lemmon Survey	EUN	1.0 km	MPC · JPL
775616	2006 VE_{174}	—	November 11, 2006	Mount Lemmon	Mount Lemmon Survey	·	1.1 km	MPC · JPL
775617	2006 VQ_{177}	—	August 24, 2011	Haleakala	Pan-STARRS 1	THM	1.9 km	MPC · JPL
775618	2006 VT_{177}	—	September 12, 2015	Haleakala	Pan-STARRS 1	·	1.3 km	MPC · JPL
775619	2006 VT_{179}	—	February 19, 2012	Kitt Peak	Spacewatch	·	1.1 km	MPC · JPL
775620	2006 VH_{181}	—	July 28, 2014	Haleakala	Pan-STARRS 1	·	1.1 km	MPC · JPL
775621	2006 VB_{182}	—	March 18, 2017	Mount Lemmon	Mount Lemmon Survey	·	1.2 km	MPC · JPL
775622	2006 VC_{182}	—	November 12, 2006	Mount Lemmon	Mount Lemmon Survey	·	2.0 km	MPC · JPL
775623	2006 VF_{182}	—	December 23, 2012	Haleakala	Pan-STARRS 1	·	1.6 km	MPC · JPL
775624	2006 VV_{182}	—	November 1, 2006	Mount Lemmon	Mount Lemmon Survey	·	1.1 km	MPC · JPL
775625	2006 WT_{2}	—	October 23, 2006	Mount Lemmon	Mount Lemmon Survey	·	1.8 km	MPC · JPL
775626	2006 WZ_{19}	—	November 17, 2006	Mount Lemmon	Mount Lemmon Survey	·	1.9 km	MPC · JPL
775627	2006 WP_{20}	—	November 17, 2006	Mount Lemmon	Mount Lemmon Survey	·	1.2 km	MPC · JPL
775628	2006 WL_{33}	—	November 16, 2006	Kitt Peak	Spacewatch	·	730 m	MPC · JPL
775629	2006 WZ_{41}	—	November 16, 2006	Mount Lemmon	Mount Lemmon Survey	·	1.3 km	MPC · JPL
775630	2006 WM_{53}	—	November 16, 2006	Catalina	CSS	·	3.0 km	MPC · JPL
775631	2006 WH_{58}	—	October 20, 2006	Mount Lemmon	Mount Lemmon Survey	·	2.4 km	MPC · JPL
775632	2006 WT_{58}	—	November 17, 2006	Kitt Peak	Spacewatch	·	1.8 km	MPC · JPL
775633	2006 WW_{67}	—	November 17, 2006	Mount Lemmon	Mount Lemmon Survey	·	1.3 km	MPC · JPL
775634	2006 WK_{80}	—	November 18, 2006	Kitt Peak	Spacewatch	·	1 km	MPC · JPL
775635	2006 WG_{84}	—	November 18, 2006	Mount Lemmon	Mount Lemmon Survey	·	2.6 km	MPC · JPL
775636	2006 WO_{86}	—	November 18, 2006	Kitt Peak	Spacewatch	·	2.0 km	MPC · JPL
775637	2006 WV_{90}	—	November 19, 2006	Kitt Peak	Spacewatch	·	2.2 km	MPC · JPL
775638	2006 WR_{91}	—	November 19, 2006	Kitt Peak	Spacewatch	·	990 m	MPC · JPL
775639	2006 WS_{91}	—	November 19, 2006	Kitt Peak	Spacewatch	·	1.6 km	MPC · JPL
775640	2006 WO_{99}	—	November 19, 2006	Kitt Peak	Spacewatch	·	1.2 km	MPC · JPL
775641	2006 WQ_{119}	—	November 21, 2006	Mount Lemmon	Mount Lemmon Survey	·	830 m	MPC · JPL
775642	2006 WZ_{119}	—	November 21, 2006	Mount Lemmon	Mount Lemmon Survey	AGN	810 m	MPC · JPL
775643	2006 WR_{126}	—	November 22, 2006	Mount Lemmon	Mount Lemmon Survey	·	2.5 km	MPC · JPL
775644	2006 WZ_{132}	—	November 10, 2006	Kitt Peak	Spacewatch	·	880 m	MPC · JPL
775645	2006 WH_{134}	—	October 19, 2006	Catalina	CSS	·	1.4 km	MPC · JPL
775646	2006 WJ_{137}	—	October 31, 2006	Mount Lemmon	Mount Lemmon Survey	·	1.1 km	MPC · JPL
775647	2006 WE_{140}	—	November 19, 2006	Kitt Peak	Spacewatch	KOR	1.0 km	MPC · JPL
775648	2006 WW_{140}	—	November 20, 2006	Kitt Peak	Spacewatch	·	1.1 km	MPC · JPL
775649	2006 WG_{141}	—	October 23, 2006	Mount Lemmon	Mount Lemmon Survey	·	2.1 km	MPC · JPL
775650	2006 WX_{144}	—	November 20, 2006	Kitt Peak	Spacewatch	·	1.3 km	MPC · JPL
775651	2006 WP_{147}	—	November 20, 2006	Kitt Peak	Spacewatch	·	2.4 km	MPC · JPL
775652	2006 WU_{154}	—	November 22, 2006	Kitt Peak	Spacewatch	·	1.9 km	MPC · JPL
775653	2006 WU_{155}	—	November 22, 2006	Kitt Peak	Spacewatch	·	1.2 km	MPC · JPL
775654	2006 WL_{158}	—	November 22, 2006	Kitt Peak	Spacewatch	·	1.2 km	MPC · JPL
775655	2006 WX_{163}	—	November 12, 2006	Mount Lemmon	Mount Lemmon Survey	·	1.9 km	MPC · JPL
775656	2006 WT_{168}	—	November 15, 2006	Kitt Peak	Spacewatch	·	1.0 km	MPC · JPL
775657	2006 WM_{173}	—	November 23, 2006	Mount Lemmon	Mount Lemmon Survey	·	1.4 km	MPC · JPL
775658	2006 WO_{175}	—	November 23, 2006	Mount Lemmon	Mount Lemmon Survey	JUN	680 m	MPC · JPL
775659	2006 WO_{177}	—	October 23, 2006	Mount Lemmon	Mount Lemmon Survey	·	2.4 km	MPC · JPL
775660	2006 WU_{179}	—	October 23, 2006	Mount Lemmon	Mount Lemmon Survey	·	1.1 km	MPC · JPL
775661	2006 WB_{180}	—	November 24, 2006	Mount Lemmon	Mount Lemmon Survey	·	1.1 km	MPC · JPL
775662	2006 WT_{180}	—	November 24, 2006	Mount Lemmon	Mount Lemmon Survey	·	1.1 km	MPC · JPL
775663	2006 WT_{189}	—	November 25, 2006	Mount Lemmon	Mount Lemmon Survey	·	1.2 km	MPC · JPL
775664	2006 WV_{189}	—	November 25, 2006	Mount Lemmon	Mount Lemmon Survey	·	1.7 km	MPC · JPL
775665	2006 WL_{211}	—	April 25, 2015	Haleakala	Pan-STARRS 1	·	2.5 km	MPC · JPL
775666	2006 WJ_{212}	—	November 27, 2006	Marly	P. Kocher	THB	2.4 km	MPC · JPL
775667	2006 WE_{215}	—	November 20, 2006	Kitt Peak	Spacewatch	·	2.5 km	MPC · JPL
775668	2006 WO_{215}	—	November 16, 2006	Kitt Peak	Spacewatch	·	1.4 km	MPC · JPL
775669	2006 WV_{215}	—	March 30, 2015	Haleakala	Pan-STARRS 1	·	2.0 km	MPC · JPL
775670	2006 WB_{216}	—	August 9, 2016	Haleakala	Pan-STARRS 1	·	2.0 km	MPC · JPL
775671	2006 WG_{216}	—	January 25, 2012	Haleakala	Pan-STARRS 1	·	1.2 km	MPC · JPL
775672	2006 WO_{221}	—	December 9, 2015	Haleakala	Pan-STARRS 1	·	1.1 km	MPC · JPL
775673	2006 WQ_{221}	—	July 1, 2014	Haleakala	Pan-STARRS 1	EUN	860 m	MPC · JPL
775674	2006 WK_{222}	—	December 23, 2012	Haleakala	Pan-STARRS 1	EOS	1.4 km	MPC · JPL
775675	2006 WK_{224}	—	April 25, 2015	Haleakala	Pan-STARRS 1	·	1.9 km	MPC · JPL
775676	2006 WM_{224}	—	September 4, 2011	Haleakala	Pan-STARRS 1	·	1.9 km	MPC · JPL
775677	2006 WN_{224}	—	October 21, 2012	Haleakala	Pan-STARRS 1	·	2.8 km	MPC · JPL
775678	2006 WZ_{224}	—	March 17, 2018	Haleakala	Pan-STARRS 1	AEO	910 m	MPC · JPL
775679	2006 WL_{225}	—	April 1, 2014	Mount Lemmon	Mount Lemmon Survey	EOS	1.5 km	MPC · JPL
775680	2006 WW_{225}	—	November 22, 2006	Kitt Peak	Spacewatch	T_{j} (2.98) · EUP	2.1 km	MPC · JPL
775681	2006 WL_{226}	—	October 28, 2016	Haleakala	Pan-STARRS 1	·	1.5 km	MPC · JPL
775682	2006 WO_{226}	—	December 29, 2011	Mount Lemmon	Mount Lemmon Survey	·	980 m	MPC · JPL
775683	2006 WA_{227}	—	May 20, 2015	Cerro Tololo	DECam	·	2.1 km	MPC · JPL
775684	2006 WJ_{227}	—	November 20, 2006	Kitt Peak	Spacewatch	·	1.2 km	MPC · JPL
775685	2006 WC_{228}	—	September 30, 2006	Mount Lemmon	Mount Lemmon Survey	·	1.0 km	MPC · JPL
775686	2006 WD_{228}	—	July 25, 2014	Haleakala	Pan-STARRS 1	·	1.2 km	MPC · JPL
775687	2006 WF_{228}	—	August 20, 2014	Haleakala	Pan-STARRS 1	·	1.2 km	MPC · JPL
775688	2006 WK_{228}	—	November 13, 2017	Haleakala	Pan-STARRS 1	·	2.0 km	MPC · JPL
775689	2006 WV_{228}	—	December 8, 2015	Haleakala	Pan-STARRS 1	·	1.0 km	MPC · JPL
775690	2006 WW_{228}	—	November 19, 2006	Mount Lemmon	Mount Lemmon Survey	BAR	1.1 km	MPC · JPL
775691	2006 WF_{229}	—	April 6, 2014	Kitt Peak	Spacewatch	·	2.1 km	MPC · JPL
775692	2006 WD_{230}	—	November 19, 2006	Kitt Peak	Spacewatch	·	960 m	MPC · JPL
775693	2006 WF_{230}	—	November 18, 2006	Kitt Peak	Spacewatch	·	2.4 km	MPC · JPL
775694	2006 WG_{230}	—	November 19, 2006	Kitt Peak	Spacewatch	·	950 m	MPC · JPL
775695	2006 WR_{230}	—	November 21, 2006	Kitt Peak	Spacewatch	·	1.4 km	MPC · JPL
775696	2006 WC_{231}	—	November 16, 2006	Mount Lemmon	Mount Lemmon Survey	·	1.0 km	MPC · JPL
775697	2006 WV_{231}	—	November 27, 2006	Kitt Peak	Spacewatch	AEO	820 m	MPC · JPL
775698	2006 WB_{234}	—	November 16, 2006	Kitt Peak	Spacewatch	·	1.0 km	MPC · JPL
775699	2006 WF_{234}	—	November 16, 2006	Kitt Peak	Spacewatch	·	1.2 km	MPC · JPL
775700	2006 WH_{234}	—	November 22, 2006	Kitt Peak	Spacewatch	·	1.3 km	MPC · JPL

== 775701–775800 ==
back to top

Designation			Discovery			Properties		Ref
Permanent	Provisional	Named after	Date	Site	Discoverer(s)	Category	Diam.	Ref
775701	2006 WP_{234}	—	November 22, 2006	Mount Lemmon	Mount Lemmon Survey	·	1.5 km	MPC · JPL
775702	2006 WP_{236}	—	November 19, 2006	Kitt Peak	Spacewatch	·	3.0 km	MPC · JPL
775703	2006 XF	—	December 9, 2006	7300	W. K. Y. Yeung	·	1.6 km	MPC · JPL
775704	2006 XM_{1}	—	December 11, 2006	7300	W. K. Y. Yeung	·	3.2 km	MPC · JPL
775705	2006 XO_{12}	—	December 10, 2006	Kitt Peak	Spacewatch	·	1.3 km	MPC · JPL
775706	2006 XV_{23}	—	December 12, 2006	Mount Lemmon	Mount Lemmon Survey	·	2.0 km	MPC · JPL
775707	2006 XL_{41}	—	December 12, 2006	Mount Lemmon	Mount Lemmon Survey	·	1.3 km	MPC · JPL
775708	2006 XO_{44}	—	December 13, 2006	Kitt Peak	Spacewatch	·	2.2 km	MPC · JPL
775709	2006 XC_{50}	—	December 13, 2006	Mount Lemmon	Mount Lemmon Survey	T_{j} (2.98) · EUP	2.5 km	MPC · JPL
775710	2006 XQ_{63}	—	November 22, 2006	Catalina	CSS	·	2.7 km	MPC · JPL
775711	2006 XA_{70}	—	December 11, 2006	Kitt Peak	Spacewatch	EUN	890 m	MPC · JPL
775712	2006 XB_{76}	—	November 28, 2016	Haleakala	Pan-STARRS 1	·	1.6 km	MPC · JPL
775713	2006 XN_{76}	—	July 7, 2016	Mount Lemmon	Mount Lemmon Survey	ELF	2.6 km	MPC · JPL
775714	2006 XX_{77}	—	July 30, 2014	Haleakala	Pan-STARRS 1	·	1.2 km	MPC · JPL
775715	2006 XG_{79}	—	January 10, 2016	Haleakala	Pan-STARRS 1	HNS	840 m	MPC · JPL
775716	2006 XA_{80}	—	October 25, 2017	Mount Lemmon	Mount Lemmon Survey	·	2.4 km	MPC · JPL
775717	2006 XB_{80}	—	June 11, 2015	Haleakala	Pan-STARRS 1	·	2.6 km	MPC · JPL
775718	2006 XS_{80}	—	December 15, 2006	Kitt Peak	Spacewatch	·	1.0 km	MPC · JPL
775719	2006 XJ_{82}	—	December 13, 2006	Mount Lemmon	Mount Lemmon Survey	·	2.0 km	MPC · JPL
775720	2006 XN_{82}	—	December 14, 2006	Kitt Peak	Spacewatch	·	2.6 km	MPC · JPL
775721	2006 XV_{82}	—	December 10, 2006	Kitt Peak	Spacewatch	EOS	1.2 km	MPC · JPL
775722	2006 XE_{83}	—	December 13, 2006	Kitt Peak	Spacewatch	·	940 m	MPC · JPL
775723	2006 XF_{84}	—	December 11, 2006	Kitt Peak	Spacewatch	·	1.2 km	MPC · JPL
775724	2006 YO_{4}	—	December 16, 2006	Kitt Peak	Spacewatch	·	1.3 km	MPC · JPL
775725	2006 YS_{22}	—	December 21, 2006	Kitt Peak	Spacewatch	·	1.5 km	MPC · JPL
775726	2006 YY_{28}	—	December 21, 2006	Kitt Peak	Spacewatch	BAR	1.2 km	MPC · JPL
775727	2006 YU_{40}	—	December 22, 2006	Kitt Peak	Spacewatch	·	1.3 km	MPC · JPL
775728	2006 YW_{44}	—	December 25, 2006	Piszkéstető	K. Sárneczky	·	1.4 km	MPC · JPL
775729	2006 YQ_{45}	—	December 21, 2006	Mount Lemmon	Mount Lemmon Survey	·	2.4 km	MPC · JPL
775730	2006 YC_{60}	—	October 2, 2011	Piszkéstető	K. Sárneczky	·	1.8 km	MPC · JPL
775731	2006 YF_{60}	—	December 12, 2012	Mount Lemmon	Mount Lemmon Survey	·	2.0 km	MPC · JPL
775732	2006 YR_{65}	—	January 17, 2016	Haleakala	Pan-STARRS 1	·	1.0 km	MPC · JPL
775733	2006 YW_{67}	—	December 21, 2006	Kitt Peak	Spacewatch	·	2.4 km	MPC · JPL
775734	2006 YA_{69}	—	December 16, 2006	Mount Lemmon	Mount Lemmon Survey	·	2.9 km	MPC · JPL
775735	2007 AK_{5}	—	December 15, 2006	Kitt Peak	Spacewatch	·	1.1 km	MPC · JPL
775736	2007 AY_{32}	—	November 16, 2006	Mount Lemmon	Mount Lemmon Survey	·	2.4 km	MPC · JPL
775737	2007 AZ_{33}	—	January 10, 2007	Mount Lemmon	Mount Lemmon Survey	DOR	1.6 km	MPC · JPL
775738	2007 AU_{34}	—	April 5, 2008	Mount Lemmon	Mount Lemmon Survey	·	1.9 km	MPC · JPL
775739	2007 AX_{34}	—	January 21, 2016	Haleakala	Pan-STARRS 1	·	1.6 km	MPC · JPL
775740	2007 AE_{35}	—	January 18, 2012	Mount Lemmon	Mount Lemmon Survey	·	1.3 km	MPC · JPL
775741	2007 AV_{36}	—	January 15, 2007	Mauna Kea	P. A. Wiegert	KOR	1.2 km	MPC · JPL
775742	2007 AF_{37}	—	October 12, 2015	Haleakala	Pan-STARRS 1	·	1.4 km	MPC · JPL
775743	2007 AT_{38}	—	February 9, 2008	Mount Lemmon	Mount Lemmon Survey	·	1.5 km	MPC · JPL
775744	2007 BK_{12}	—	January 17, 2007	Kitt Peak	Spacewatch	·	1.3 km	MPC · JPL
775745	2007 BW_{31}	—	January 24, 2007	Saint-Sulpice	B. Christophe	·	1.1 km	MPC · JPL
775746	2007 BP_{37}	—	January 24, 2007	Mount Lemmon	Mount Lemmon Survey	·	2.5 km	MPC · JPL
775747	2007 BC_{43}	—	January 24, 2007	Mount Lemmon	Mount Lemmon Survey	·	1.1 km	MPC · JPL
775748	2007 BE_{52}	—	January 24, 2007	Kitt Peak	Spacewatch	·	1.1 km	MPC · JPL
775749	2007 BZ_{63}	—	December 14, 2006	Mount Lemmon	Mount Lemmon Survey	·	1.3 km	MPC · JPL
775750	2007 BL_{82}	—	January 19, 2007	Mauna Kea	P. A. Wiegert	·	1.2 km	MPC · JPL
775751	2007 BO_{82}	—	January 19, 2007	Mauna Kea	P. A. Wiegert	·	1.2 km	MPC · JPL
775752	2007 BZ_{82}	—	August 28, 2000	Cerro Tololo	Deep Ecliptic Survey	·	1.3 km	MPC · JPL
775753	2007 BA_{84}	—	January 19, 2007	Mauna Kea	P. A. Wiegert	·	1.1 km	MPC · JPL
775754	2007 BM_{84}	—	January 19, 2007	Mauna Kea	P. A. Wiegert	·	1.1 km	MPC · JPL
775755	2007 BP_{84}	—	January 19, 2007	Mauna Kea	P. A. Wiegert	·	1.0 km	MPC · JPL
775756	2007 BF_{87}	—	January 25, 2007	Kitt Peak	Spacewatch	·	1.2 km	MPC · JPL
775757	2007 BR_{91}	—	January 19, 2007	Mauna Kea	P. A. Wiegert	·	3.0 km	MPC · JPL
775758	2007 BF_{95}	—	January 19, 2007	Mauna Kea	P. A. Wiegert	·	1.4 km	MPC · JPL
775759	2007 BE_{99}	—	January 19, 2007	Mauna Kea	P. A. Wiegert	·	2.1 km	MPC · JPL
775760	2007 BR_{103}	—	January 27, 2007	Mount Lemmon	Mount Lemmon Survey	WIT	760 m	MPC · JPL
775761	2007 BC_{106}	—	January 10, 2007	Kitt Peak	Spacewatch	·	2.0 km	MPC · JPL
775762	2007 BS_{108}	—	January 25, 2007	Kitt Peak	Spacewatch	·	1.1 km	MPC · JPL
775763	2007 BC_{112}	—	January 7, 2016	Haleakala	Pan-STARRS 1	·	1.5 km	MPC · JPL
775764	2007 BF_{112}	—	January 26, 2017	Mount Lemmon	Mount Lemmon Survey	KOR	1.0 km	MPC · JPL
775765	2007 BO_{113}	—	May 2, 2014	Kitt Peak	Spacewatch	·	2.1 km	MPC · JPL
775766	2007 BK_{116}	—	January 28, 2007	Kitt Peak	Spacewatch	·	2.7 km	MPC · JPL
775767	2007 BN_{116}	—	October 28, 2014	Mount Lemmon	Mount Lemmon Survey	·	1.2 km	MPC · JPL
775768	2007 BO_{118}	—	January 27, 2007	Kitt Peak	Spacewatch	THM	1.5 km	MPC · JPL
775769	2007 BP_{119}	—	January 28, 2007	Kitt Peak	Spacewatch	·	1.8 km	MPC · JPL
775770	2007 BU_{119}	—	January 28, 2007	Mount Lemmon	Mount Lemmon Survey	·	2.3 km	MPC · JPL
775771	2007 BL_{120}	—	January 29, 2007	Kitt Peak	Spacewatch	·	980 m	MPC · JPL
775772	2007 BR_{120}	—	May 30, 2008	Mount Lemmon	Mount Lemmon Survey	·	1.1 km	MPC · JPL
775773	2007 BU_{120}	—	November 26, 2011	Mount Lemmon	Mount Lemmon Survey	·	2.3 km	MPC · JPL
775774	2007 BZ_{120}	—	January 17, 2007	Kitt Peak	Spacewatch	·	2.0 km	MPC · JPL
775775	2007 CN_{17}	—	February 8, 2007	Mount Lemmon	Mount Lemmon Survey	·	1.4 km	MPC · JPL
775776	2007 CP_{31}	—	August 30, 2005	Kitt Peak	Spacewatch	·	860 m	MPC · JPL
775777	2007 CN_{37}	—	February 6, 2007	Mount Lemmon	Mount Lemmon Survey	·	2.3 km	MPC · JPL
775778	2007 CL_{48}	—	February 10, 2007	Mount Lemmon	Mount Lemmon Survey	LUT	2.8 km	MPC · JPL
775779	2007 CY_{72}	—	February 14, 2007	Mauna Kea	P. A. Wiegert	·	1.3 km	MPC · JPL
775780	2007 CE_{75}	—	January 27, 2007	Kitt Peak	Spacewatch	·	1.3 km	MPC · JPL
775781	2007 CM_{77}	—	February 14, 2007	Mauna Kea	P. A. Wiegert	AGN	840 m	MPC · JPL
775782	2007 CG_{80}	—	February 8, 2007	Mount Lemmon	Mount Lemmon Survey	·	1.4 km	MPC · JPL
775783	2007 CL_{80}	—	February 7, 2007	Mount Lemmon	Mount Lemmon Survey	(1547)	1.4 km	MPC · JPL
775784	2007 CZ_{83}	—	February 9, 2007	Catalina	CSS	·	1.7 km	MPC · JPL
775785	2007 CN_{86}	—	February 6, 2007	Mount Lemmon	Mount Lemmon Survey	·	2.9 km	MPC · JPL
775786	2007 CX_{86}	—	February 10, 2007	Mount Lemmon	Mount Lemmon Survey	·	1.1 km	MPC · JPL
775787	2007 DK_{36}	—	February 17, 2007	Kitt Peak	Spacewatch	·	950 m	MPC · JPL
775788	2007 DM_{52}	—	February 19, 2007	Mount Lemmon	Mount Lemmon Survey	DOR	2.1 km	MPC · JPL
775789	2007 DJ_{60}	—	February 10, 2007	Catalina	CSS	·	1.4 km	MPC · JPL
775790	2007 DK_{68}	—	February 21, 2007	Kitt Peak	Spacewatch	·	1.3 km	MPC · JPL
775791	2007 DZ_{72}	—	February 21, 2007	Kitt Peak	Spacewatch	·	800 m	MPC · JPL
775792	2007 DM_{73}	—	February 21, 2007	Kitt Peak	Spacewatch	MIS	1.7 km	MPC · JPL
775793	2007 DP_{74}	—	February 21, 2007	Kitt Peak	Spacewatch	NEM	1.4 km	MPC · JPL
775794	2007 DF_{79}	—	February 23, 2007	Kitt Peak	Spacewatch	AGN	870 m	MPC · JPL
775795	2007 DB_{80}	—	February 23, 2007	Mount Lemmon	Mount Lemmon Survey	(1298)	2.0 km	MPC · JPL
775796	2007 DU_{80}	—	November 6, 2005	Kitt Peak	Spacewatch	·	1.5 km	MPC · JPL
775797	2007 DS_{83}	—	February 25, 2007	Mount Lemmon	Mount Lemmon Survey	·	1.2 km	MPC · JPL
775798	2007 DZ_{91}	—	February 23, 2007	Mount Lemmon	Mount Lemmon Survey	·	1.8 km	MPC · JPL
775799	2007 DU_{92}	—	February 23, 2007	Kitt Peak	Spacewatch	·	1.3 km	MPC · JPL
775800	2007 DL_{98}	—	February 18, 2007	Bergisch Gladbach	W. Bickel	·	1.6 km	MPC · JPL

== 775801–775900 ==
back to top

Designation			Discovery			Properties		Ref
Permanent	Provisional	Named after	Date	Site	Discoverer(s)	Category	Diam.	Ref
775801	2007 DN_{100}	—	February 25, 2007	Kitt Peak	Spacewatch	·	2.1 km	MPC · JPL
775802	2007 DW_{118}	—	February 23, 2007	Mount Lemmon	Mount Lemmon Survey	·	1.8 km	MPC · JPL
775803	2007 DC_{121}	—	February 23, 2007	Kitt Peak	Spacewatch	HOF	2.0 km	MPC · JPL
775804	2007 DJ_{124}	—	February 25, 2007	Mount Lemmon	Mount Lemmon Survey	·	1.2 km	MPC · JPL
775805	2007 DX_{124}	—	August 8, 2018	Haleakala	Pan-STARRS 1	·	1.4 km	MPC · JPL
775806	2007 DV_{125}	—	February 8, 2011	Mount Lemmon	Mount Lemmon Survey	·	1.3 km	MPC · JPL
775807	2007 DN_{126}	—	February 5, 2016	Haleakala	Pan-STARRS 1	·	1.3 km	MPC · JPL
775808	2007 DP_{126}	—	February 21, 2007	Mount Lemmon	Mount Lemmon Survey	·	2.0 km	MPC · JPL
775809	2007 DD_{128}	—	February 21, 2007	Mount Lemmon	Mount Lemmon Survey	·	1.3 km	MPC · JPL
775810	2007 DG_{128}	—	February 21, 2007	Mount Lemmon	Mount Lemmon Survey	·	1.1 km	MPC · JPL
775811	2007 DU_{128}	—	February 25, 2007	Kitt Peak	Spacewatch	·	1.3 km	MPC · JPL
775812	2007 DZ_{128}	—	February 25, 2007	Kitt Peak	Spacewatch	EOS	1.2 km	MPC · JPL
775813	2007 DX_{130}	—	February 27, 2007	Kitt Peak	Spacewatch	·	1.6 km	MPC · JPL
775814	2007 DH_{131}	—	February 25, 2007	Mount Lemmon	Mount Lemmon Survey	·	1.5 km	MPC · JPL
775815	2007 DU_{131}	—	February 17, 2007	Mount Lemmon	Mount Lemmon Survey	·	2.5 km	MPC · JPL
775816	2007 DH_{133}	—	February 21, 2007	Mount Lemmon	Mount Lemmon Survey	URS	2.7 km	MPC · JPL
775817	2007 DJ_{133}	—	February 17, 2007	Mount Lemmon	Mount Lemmon Survey	·	2.1 km	MPC · JPL
775818	2007 DK_{134}	—	February 21, 2007	Kitt Peak	Spacewatch	·	2.0 km	MPC · JPL
775819	2007 EG_{3}	—	March 9, 2007	Catalina	CSS	·	2.2 km	MPC · JPL
775820	2007 EJ_{6}	—	March 9, 2007	Mount Lemmon	Mount Lemmon Survey	·	2.5 km	MPC · JPL
775821	2007 EL_{8}	—	February 17, 2007	Kitt Peak	Spacewatch	·	1.7 km	MPC · JPL
775822	2007 EG_{19}	—	February 25, 2007	Kitt Peak	Spacewatch	PAD	1.2 km	MPC · JPL
775823	2007 ED_{24}	—	March 10, 2007	Mount Lemmon	Mount Lemmon Survey	·	1.6 km	MPC · JPL
775824	2007 ER_{54}	—	March 12, 2007	Kitt Peak	Spacewatch	MRX	710 m	MPC · JPL
775825	2007 ER_{55}	—	March 12, 2007	Mount Lemmon	Mount Lemmon Survey	·	1.3 km	MPC · JPL
775826	2007 ET_{63}	—	February 25, 2007	Kitt Peak	Spacewatch	·	1.2 km	MPC · JPL
775827	2007 EG_{74}	—	March 10, 2007	Kitt Peak	Spacewatch	GEF	1.0 km	MPC · JPL
775828	2007 EX_{85}	—	March 12, 2007	Kitt Peak	Spacewatch	·	740 m	MPC · JPL
775829	2007 EC_{103}	—	February 23, 2007	Mount Lemmon	Mount Lemmon Survey	DOR	1.5 km	MPC · JPL
775830	2007 ED_{104}	—	March 11, 2007	Mount Lemmon	Mount Lemmon Survey	·	1.3 km	MPC · JPL
775831	2007 EE_{114}	—	February 23, 2007	Kitt Peak	Spacewatch	·	1.4 km	MPC · JPL
775832	2007 EH_{119}	—	March 13, 2007	Mount Lemmon	Mount Lemmon Survey	·	1.4 km	MPC · JPL
775833	2007 EG_{122}	—	March 14, 2007	Mount Lemmon	Mount Lemmon Survey	DOR	2.1 km	MPC · JPL
775834	2007 EP_{127}	—	March 9, 2007	Mount Lemmon	Mount Lemmon Survey	·	2.3 km	MPC · JPL
775835	2007 EV_{155}	—	March 12, 2007	Kitt Peak	Spacewatch	·	1.3 km	MPC · JPL
775836	2007 EL_{162}	—	March 15, 2007	Mount Lemmon	Mount Lemmon Survey	EOS	1.4 km	MPC · JPL
775837	2007 EY_{163}	—	March 15, 2007	Mount Lemmon	Mount Lemmon Survey	·	1.9 km	MPC · JPL
775838	2007 EY_{176}	—	March 14, 2007	Kitt Peak	Spacewatch	·	1.3 km	MPC · JPL
775839	2007 EL_{209}	—	March 15, 2007	Kitt Peak	Spacewatch	AGN	830 m	MPC · JPL
775840	2007 EY_{229}	—	March 10, 2016	Mount Lemmon	Mount Lemmon Survey	·	1.2 km	MPC · JPL
775841	2007 EP_{236}	—	March 13, 2007	Mount Lemmon	Mount Lemmon Survey	·	1.5 km	MPC · JPL
775842	2007 ES_{237}	—	March 14, 2007	Mount Lemmon	Mount Lemmon Survey	·	1.3 km	MPC · JPL
775843	2007 ET_{238}	—	March 14, 2007	Mount Lemmon	Mount Lemmon Survey	DOR	1.9 km	MPC · JPL
775844	2007 EA_{239}	—	March 11, 2007	Mount Lemmon	Mount Lemmon Survey	·	1.4 km	MPC · JPL
775845	2007 EO_{239}	—	March 15, 2007	Mount Lemmon	Mount Lemmon Survey	AEO	880 m	MPC · JPL
775846	2007 EQ_{240}	—	March 10, 2007	Kitt Peak	Spacewatch	·	1.9 km	MPC · JPL
775847	2007 EY_{241}	—	March 13, 2007	Kitt Peak	Spacewatch	·	1.5 km	MPC · JPL
775848	2007 EB_{242}	—	March 11, 2007	Mount Lemmon	Mount Lemmon Survey	·	1.9 km	MPC · JPL
775849	2007 EF_{243}	—	March 10, 2007	Mount Lemmon	Mount Lemmon Survey	·	1.9 km	MPC · JPL
775850	2007 EL_{243}	—	March 15, 2007	Mount Lemmon	Mount Lemmon Survey	·	2.0 km	MPC · JPL
775851	2007 FF_{4}	—	March 18, 2007	Mount Nyukasa	Japan Aerospace Exploration Agency	·	1.4 km	MPC · JPL
775852	2007 FH_{4}	—	March 18, 2007	Mount Nyukasa	Japan Aerospace Exploration Agency	·	1.0 km	MPC · JPL
775853	2007 FK_{5}	—	March 14, 2007	Eskridge	D. Tibbets, G. Hug	·	1.2 km	MPC · JPL
775854	2007 FN_{6}	—	March 16, 2007	Mount Lemmon	Mount Lemmon Survey	·	2.1 km	MPC · JPL
775855	2007 FV_{14}	—	March 19, 2007	Mount Lemmon	Mount Lemmon Survey	RAF	660 m	MPC · JPL
775856	2007 FW_{28}	—	March 10, 2007	Mount Lemmon	Mount Lemmon Survey	·	1.2 km	MPC · JPL
775857	2007 FB_{34}	—	March 25, 2007	Mount Lemmon	Mount Lemmon Survey	·	2.2 km	MPC · JPL
775858	2007 FG_{42}	—	March 13, 2007	Kitt Peak	Spacewatch	·	1.5 km	MPC · JPL
775859	2007 FA_{51}	—	March 16, 2007	Mount Lemmon	Mount Lemmon Survey	·	1.3 km	MPC · JPL
775860	2007 FL_{52}	—	March 16, 2007	Mount Lemmon	Mount Lemmon Survey	TIN	760 m	MPC · JPL
775861	2007 FE_{56}	—	March 26, 2007	Mount Lemmon	Mount Lemmon Survey	EOS	1.4 km	MPC · JPL
775862	2007 FS_{57}	—	January 28, 2017	Haleakala	Pan-STARRS 1	L5	5.6 km	MPC · JPL
775863	2007 FB_{58}	—	March 16, 2007	Mount Lemmon	Mount Lemmon Survey	·	1.3 km	MPC · JPL
775864	2007 FD_{60}	—	March 17, 2007	Kitt Peak	Spacewatch	·	1.2 km	MPC · JPL
775865	2007 FG_{62}	—	March 16, 2007	Mount Lemmon	Mount Lemmon Survey	·	1.3 km	MPC · JPL
775866	2007 FH_{62}	—	March 25, 2007	Mount Lemmon	Mount Lemmon Survey	·	1.8 km	MPC · JPL
775867	2007 FV_{62}	—	March 16, 2007	Mount Lemmon	Mount Lemmon Survey	·	2.7 km	MPC · JPL
775868	2007 FY_{63}	—	March 16, 2007	Mount Lemmon	Mount Lemmon Survey	·	1.0 km	MPC · JPL
775869	2007 FN_{64}	—	March 19, 2007	Mount Lemmon	Mount Lemmon Survey	·	2.0 km	MPC · JPL
775870	2007 GY_{6}	—	April 7, 2007	Mount Lemmon	Mount Lemmon Survey	·	1.8 km	MPC · JPL
775871	2007 GK_{30}	—	April 14, 2007	Mount Lemmon	Mount Lemmon Survey	·	1.6 km	MPC · JPL
775872	2007 GE_{60}	—	April 7, 2007	Mount Lemmon	Mount Lemmon Survey	·	2.9 km	MPC · JPL
775873	2007 GH_{70}	—	November 16, 2014	Mount Lemmon	Mount Lemmon Survey	AGN	890 m	MPC · JPL
775874	2007 GM_{80}	—	May 13, 2012	Mount Lemmon	Mount Lemmon Survey	·	1.3 km	MPC · JPL
775875	2007 GG_{81}	—	April 15, 2007	Mount Lemmon	Mount Lemmon Survey	AGN	860 m	MPC · JPL
775876	2007 HB_{10}	—	April 18, 2007	Mount Lemmon	Mount Lemmon Survey	SYL	2.7 km	MPC · JPL
775877	2007 HH_{18}	—	September 28, 2003	Kitt Peak	Spacewatch	TIR	2.3 km	MPC · JPL
775878	2007 HG_{21}	—	April 18, 2007	Kitt Peak	Spacewatch	·	1.3 km	MPC · JPL
775879	2007 HV_{38}	—	March 11, 2007	Kitt Peak	Spacewatch	·	1.9 km	MPC · JPL
775880	2007 HD_{40}	—	April 20, 2007	Mount Lemmon	Mount Lemmon Survey	·	2.2 km	MPC · JPL
775881	2007 HD_{57}	—	April 22, 2007	Mount Lemmon	Mount Lemmon Survey	DOR	1.7 km	MPC · JPL
775882	2007 HQ_{100}	—	April 26, 2007	Mount Lemmon	Mount Lemmon Survey	DOR	1.8 km	MPC · JPL
775883	2007 HD_{103}	—	April 20, 2007	Kitt Peak	Spacewatch	TIN	920 m	MPC · JPL
775884	2007 HS_{106}	—	April 24, 2007	Mount Lemmon	Mount Lemmon Survey	·	2.0 km	MPC · JPL
775885	2007 HT_{107}	—	October 5, 2013	Haleakala	Pan-STARRS 1	·	1.3 km	MPC · JPL
775886	2007 HE_{114}	—	April 22, 2007	Kitt Peak	Spacewatch	·	1.7 km	MPC · JPL
775887	2007 HZ_{115}	—	April 18, 2007	Kitt Peak	Spacewatch	EOS	1.3 km	MPC · JPL
775888	2007 JJ_{5}	—	March 14, 2007	Mount Lemmon	Mount Lemmon Survey	·	1.5 km	MPC · JPL
775889	2007 JB_{25}	—	May 9, 2007	Mount Lemmon	Mount Lemmon Survey	·	1.9 km	MPC · JPL
775890	2007 JW_{27}	—	April 18, 2007	Mount Lemmon	Mount Lemmon Survey	·	1.7 km	MPC · JPL
775891	2007 JR_{49}	—	April 27, 2012	Haleakala	Pan-STARRS 1	EOS	1.2 km	MPC · JPL
775892	2007 JS_{49}	—	April 17, 2013	Haleakala	Pan-STARRS 1	·	2.8 km	MPC · JPL
775893	2007 JF_{50}	—	May 12, 2007	Kitt Peak	Spacewatch	TIR	2.0 km	MPC · JPL
775894	2007 JH_{50}	—	September 30, 2014	Mount Lemmon	Mount Lemmon Survey	·	1.9 km	MPC · JPL
775895	2007 JL_{50}	—	January 22, 2015	Haleakala	Pan-STARRS 1	·	720 m	MPC · JPL
775896	2007 JU_{50}	—	February 29, 2012	Mount Lemmon	Mount Lemmon Survey	·	2.4 km	MPC · JPL
775897	2007 JZ_{50}	—	May 13, 2007	Mount Lemmon	Mount Lemmon Survey	·	1.9 km	MPC · JPL
775898	2007 JW_{51}	—	May 11, 2007	Mount Lemmon	Mount Lemmon Survey	EOS	1.3 km	MPC · JPL
775899	2007 KW_{6}	—	May 25, 2007	Mount Lemmon	Mount Lemmon Survey	·	1.5 km	MPC · JPL
775900	2007 KT_{11}	—	May 25, 2007	Mount Lemmon	Mount Lemmon Survey	·	2.0 km	MPC · JPL

== 775901–776000 ==
back to top

Designation			Discovery			Properties		Ref
Permanent	Provisional	Named after	Date	Site	Discoverer(s)	Category	Diam.	Ref
775901	2007 KC_{12}	—	May 16, 2007	Mount Lemmon	Mount Lemmon Survey	·	1.8 km	MPC · JPL
775902	2007 LQ_{5}	—	June 7, 2007	Kitt Peak	Spacewatch	·	1.7 km	MPC · JPL
775903	2007 LY_{28}	—	June 15, 2007	Kitt Peak	Spacewatch	·	990 m	MPC · JPL
775904	2007 LJ_{30}	—	June 11, 2007	Mauna Kea	D. D. Balam, K. M. Perrett	MAR	660 m	MPC · JPL
775905	2007 LX_{31}	—	June 15, 2007	Kitt Peak	Spacewatch	·	1.6 km	MPC · JPL
775906	2007 LC_{35}	—	June 9, 2007	Kitt Peak	Spacewatch	BRG	920 m	MPC · JPL
775907	2007 LJ_{36}	—	June 10, 2007	Kitt Peak	Spacewatch	EOS	1.3 km	MPC · JPL
775908	2007 LP_{39}	—	August 30, 2014	Haleakala	Pan-STARRS 1	·	2.3 km	MPC · JPL
775909	2007 MY	—	May 13, 2007	Mount Lemmon	Mount Lemmon Survey	·	1.5 km	MPC · JPL
775910	2007 MV_{8}	—	June 8, 2007	Kitt Peak	Spacewatch	·	2.8 km	MPC · JPL
775911	2007 MO_{10}	—	June 21, 2007	Mount Lemmon	Mount Lemmon Survey	ADE	1.3 km	MPC · JPL
775912	2007 MB_{21}	—	June 21, 2007	Mount Lemmon	Mount Lemmon Survey	EUN	880 m	MPC · JPL
775913	2007 MZ_{29}	—	March 25, 2015	Haleakala	Pan-STARRS 1	EUN	730 m	MPC · JPL
775914	2007 NC_{1}	—	June 13, 2007	Siding Spring	SSS	·	1.4 km	MPC · JPL
775915	2007 NU_{5}	—	July 15, 2007	Siding Spring	SSS	·	1.7 km	MPC · JPL
775916	2007 NT_{7}	—	January 17, 2015	Haleakala	Pan-STARRS 1	TIN	1.1 km	MPC · JPL
775917	2007 PB_{2}	—	July 18, 2007	Mount Lemmon	Mount Lemmon Survey	·	1.3 km	MPC · JPL
775918	2007 PN_{27}	—	August 14, 2007	Pla D'Arguines	R. Ferrando, Ferrando, M.	·	1.6 km	MPC · JPL
775919	2007 PX_{51}	—	May 21, 2012	Mount Lemmon	Mount Lemmon Survey	TIN	830 m	MPC · JPL
775920	2007 PR_{55}	—	August 10, 2007	Kitt Peak	Spacewatch	HOF	1.7 km	MPC · JPL
775921	2007 PE_{56}	—	August 10, 2007	Kitt Peak	Spacewatch	·	1.2 km	MPC · JPL
775922	2007 PO_{56}	—	August 9, 2007	Kitt Peak	Spacewatch	·	830 m	MPC · JPL
775923	2007 QG_{3}	—	August 22, 2007	Andrushivka	Y. Ivaščenko	(5)	1.1 km	MPC · JPL
775924	2007 QW_{4}	—	August 31, 2007	Siding Spring	K. Sárneczky, L. Kiss	·	1.7 km	MPC · JPL
775925	2007 QC_{20}	—	August 22, 2007	Kitt Peak	Spacewatch	EUN	760 m	MPC · JPL
775926	2007 QH_{20}	—	August 24, 2007	Kitt Peak	Spacewatch	·	1.7 km	MPC · JPL
775927	2007 RL_{5}	—	September 16, 2003	Kitt Peak	Spacewatch	·	770 m	MPC · JPL
775928	2007 RN_{20}	—	August 22, 2007	Anderson Mesa	LONEOS	·	1.6 km	MPC · JPL
775929	2007 RP_{25}	—	September 4, 2007	Mount Lemmon	Mount Lemmon Survey	·	740 m	MPC · JPL
775930	2007 RX_{29}	—	August 23, 2007	Kitt Peak	Spacewatch	·	2.2 km	MPC · JPL
775931	2007 RX_{39}	—	September 9, 2007	Kitt Peak	Spacewatch	THM	1.5 km	MPC · JPL
775932	2007 RK_{47}	—	September 9, 2007	Mount Lemmon	Mount Lemmon Survey	T_{j} (2.98) · 3:2	3.4 km	MPC · JPL
775933	2007 RL_{53}	—	September 9, 2007	Kitt Peak	Spacewatch	·	2.1 km	MPC · JPL
775934	2007 RW_{58}	—	August 10, 2007	Kitt Peak	Spacewatch	·	1.0 km	MPC · JPL
775935	2007 RT_{62}	—	September 10, 2007	Mount Lemmon	Mount Lemmon Survey	·	2.5 km	MPC · JPL
775936	2007 RH_{64}	—	August 10, 2007	Kitt Peak	Spacewatch	·	1.4 km	MPC · JPL
775937	2007 RM_{66}	—	September 10, 2007	Mount Lemmon	Mount Lemmon Survey	VER	1.9 km	MPC · JPL
775938	2007 RQ_{68}	—	September 30, 2003	Kitt Peak	Spacewatch	BRG	970 m	MPC · JPL
775939	2007 RO_{76}	—	September 10, 2007	Mount Lemmon	Mount Lemmon Survey	·	1.7 km	MPC · JPL
775940	2007 RC_{87}	—	September 21, 2003	Kitt Peak	Spacewatch	·	1.2 km	MPC · JPL
775941	2007 RY_{96}	—	September 10, 2007	Mount Lemmon	Mount Lemmon Survey	·	760 m	MPC · JPL
775942	2007 RB_{97}	—	September 10, 2007	Mount Lemmon	Mount Lemmon Survey	·	1.1 km	MPC · JPL
775943	2007 RP_{104}	—	September 11, 2007	Mount Lemmon	Mount Lemmon Survey	·	750 m	MPC · JPL
775944	2007 RN_{107}	—	September 11, 2007	Mount Lemmon	Mount Lemmon Survey	·	1.9 km	MPC · JPL
775945	2007 RA_{116}	—	September 11, 2007	Kitt Peak	Spacewatch	EUN	790 m	MPC · JPL
775946	2007 RO_{119}	—	September 11, 2007	XuYi	PMO NEO Survey Program	·	2.4 km	MPC · JPL
775947	2007 RB_{123}	—	September 12, 2007	Mount Lemmon	Mount Lemmon Survey	·	1.2 km	MPC · JPL
775948	2007 RZ_{129}	—	September 12, 2007	Mount Lemmon	Mount Lemmon Survey	·	1.2 km	MPC · JPL
775949	2007 RY_{137}	—	September 14, 2007	Mount Lemmon	Mount Lemmon Survey	·	1.6 km	MPC · JPL
775950	2007 RE_{138}	—	September 14, 2007	Lulin	LUSS	·	1.6 km	MPC · JPL
775951	2007 RW_{155}	—	March 12, 2005	Kitt Peak	Deep Ecliptic Survey	·	1.4 km	MPC · JPL
775952	2007 RJ_{166}	—	September 10, 2007	Kitt Peak	Spacewatch	·	1.3 km	MPC · JPL
775953	2007 RH_{175}	—	November 19, 2003	Kitt Peak	Spacewatch	·	810 m	MPC · JPL
775954	2007 RT_{189}	—	September 10, 2007	Kitt Peak	Spacewatch	·	1.8 km	MPC · JPL
775955	2007 RS_{191}	—	September 11, 2007	Kitt Peak	Spacewatch	·	1.9 km	MPC · JPL
775956	2007 RU_{192}	—	September 12, 2007	Kitt Peak	Spacewatch	·	770 m	MPC · JPL
775957	2007 RE_{224}	—	August 23, 2007	Kitt Peak	Spacewatch	LIX	2.3 km	MPC · JPL
775958	2007 RF_{225}	—	September 10, 2007	Kitt Peak	Spacewatch	·	1.3 km	MPC · JPL
775959	2007 RM_{226}	—	September 10, 2007	Kitt Peak	Spacewatch	KOR	1.1 km	MPC · JPL
775960	2007 RG_{234}	—	September 12, 2007	Catalina	CSS	·	2.6 km	MPC · JPL
775961	2007 RN_{250}	—	September 13, 2007	Kitt Peak	Spacewatch	ELF	2.4 km	MPC · JPL
775962	2007 RC_{258}	—	September 14, 2007	Mount Lemmon	Mount Lemmon Survey	THM	2.0 km	MPC · JPL
775963	2007 RU_{260}	—	September 14, 2007	Kitt Peak	Spacewatch	·	1.8 km	MPC · JPL
775964	2007 RK_{265}	—	July 18, 2007	Mount Lemmon	Mount Lemmon Survey	·	1.2 km	MPC · JPL
775965	2007 RJ_{266}	—	September 15, 2007	Mount Lemmon	Mount Lemmon Survey	·	2.2 km	MPC · JPL
775966	2007 RC_{267}	—	September 15, 2007	Kitt Peak	Spacewatch	·	2.2 km	MPC · JPL
775967	2007 RK_{267}	—	September 15, 2007	Kitt Peak	Spacewatch	·	1.1 km	MPC · JPL
775968	2007 RB_{279}	—	August 11, 2007	Siding Spring	SSS	(194)	1.4 km	MPC · JPL
775969	2007 RP_{289}	—	September 12, 2007	Mount Lemmon	Mount Lemmon Survey	·	820 m	MPC · JPL
775970	2007 RN_{294}	—	September 13, 2007	Mount Lemmon	Mount Lemmon Survey	·	870 m	MPC · JPL
775971	2007 RJ_{295}	—	September 14, 2007	Mount Lemmon	Mount Lemmon Survey	·	1.1 km	MPC · JPL
775972	2007 RU_{295}	—	September 14, 2007	Kitt Peak	Spacewatch	VER	2.0 km	MPC · JPL
775973	2007 RO_{299}	—	September 12, 2007	Mount Lemmon	Mount Lemmon Survey	THM	1.5 km	MPC · JPL
775974	2007 RS_{299}	—	September 12, 2007	Mount Lemmon	Mount Lemmon Survey	·	1.4 km	MPC · JPL
775975	2007 RX_{304}	—	September 14, 2007	Mauna Kea	P. A. Wiegert	EOS	1.0 km	MPC · JPL
775976	2007 RN_{308}	—	September 13, 2007	Mount Lemmon	Mount Lemmon Survey	·	1.8 km	MPC · JPL
775977	2007 RX_{318}	—	September 11, 2007	Mount Lemmon	Mount Lemmon Survey	MAR	780 m	MPC · JPL
775978	2007 RQ_{325}	—	September 14, 2007	Mount Lemmon	Mount Lemmon Survey	·	1.8 km	MPC · JPL
775979	2007 RH_{329}	—	September 15, 2007	Mount Lemmon	Mount Lemmon Survey	·	1 km	MPC · JPL
775980	2007 RP_{332}	—	September 14, 2007	Mount Lemmon	Mount Lemmon Survey	·	1.3 km	MPC · JPL
775981	2007 RG_{335}	—	February 16, 2015	Haleakala	Pan-STARRS 1	·	1.3 km	MPC · JPL
775982	2007 RO_{335}	—	November 12, 2012	Mount Lemmon	Mount Lemmon Survey	·	1.3 km	MPC · JPL
775983	2007 RR_{335}	—	September 14, 2007	Mount Lemmon	Mount Lemmon Survey	·	1.7 km	MPC · JPL
775984	2007 RN_{341}	—	September 14, 2007	Mount Lemmon	Mount Lemmon Survey	·	1.8 km	MPC · JPL
775985	2007 RW_{341}	—	March 18, 2018	Haleakala	Pan-STARRS 1	·	770 m	MPC · JPL
775986	2007 RE_{343}	—	September 13, 2007	Mount Lemmon	Mount Lemmon Survey	·	2.3 km	MPC · JPL
775987	2007 RF_{343}	—	September 15, 2007	Mount Lemmon	Mount Lemmon Survey	·	2.4 km	MPC · JPL
775988	2007 RG_{345}	—	February 16, 2015	Haleakala	Pan-STARRS 1	·	1.6 km	MPC · JPL
775989	2007 RE_{348}	—	September 14, 2007	Mount Lemmon	Mount Lemmon Survey	·	1.4 km	MPC · JPL
775990	2007 RG_{348}	—	September 11, 2016	Mount Lemmon	Mount Lemmon Survey	·	1.5 km	MPC · JPL
775991	2007 RT_{348}	—	April 11, 2015	Mount Lemmon	Mount Lemmon Survey	KOR	1.0 km	MPC · JPL
775992	2007 RE_{349}	—	March 16, 2015	Mount Lemmon	Mount Lemmon Survey	KOR	1.2 km	MPC · JPL
775993	2007 RA_{350}	—	February 19, 2015	Haleakala	Pan-STARRS 1	·	2.1 km	MPC · JPL
775994	2007 RL_{351}	—	October 3, 2013	Haleakala	Pan-STARRS 1	·	2.3 km	MPC · JPL
775995	2007 RR_{351}	—	September 13, 2007	Mount Lemmon	Mount Lemmon Survey	KOR	1.0 km	MPC · JPL
775996	2007 RW_{352}	—	September 10, 2007	Kitt Peak	Spacewatch	3:2 · SHU	3.3 km	MPC · JPL
775997	2007 RB_{353}	—	September 11, 2007	Mount Lemmon	Mount Lemmon Survey	·	2.0 km	MPC · JPL
775998	2007 RQ_{353}	—	September 12, 2007	Mount Lemmon	Mount Lemmon Survey	·	2.2 km	MPC · JPL
775999	2007 RD_{354}	—	September 12, 2007	Mount Lemmon	Mount Lemmon Survey	EOS	1.4 km	MPC · JPL
776000	2007 RH_{354}	—	September 10, 2007	Mount Lemmon	Mount Lemmon Survey	·	1.4 km	MPC · JPL

back to top
