= List of minor planets: 863001–864000 =

The following is a partial list of minor planets, running from minor-planet number 863001 through 864000, inclusive. The primary data for this and other partial lists is based on JPL's "Small-Body Orbital Elements" and data available from the Minor Planet Center. Critical list information is also provided by the MPC, unless otherwise specified from Lowell Observatory. A detailed description of the table's columns and additional sources are given on the main page including a complete list of every page in this series, and a statistical break-up on the dynamical classification of minor planets.

Also see the summary list of all named bodies in numerical and alphabetical order, and the corresponding naming citations for the number range of this particular list. New namings may only be added to this list after official publication, as the preannouncement of names is condemned by the Working Group for Small Bodies Nomenclature of the International Astronomical Union.

Near-Earth obj.	MBA (inner)	MBA (outer)	Centaur
Mars-crosser	MBA (middle)	Jupiter trojan	Trans-Neptunian obj.
Unclassified

== 863001–863100 ==
Designation			Discovery			Properties		Ref
Permanent	Provisional	Named after	Date	Site	Discoverer(s)	Category	Diam.	Ref
863001	2014 SR_{113}	—	September 2, 2014	Haleakala	Pan-STARRS 1	·	1.3 km	MPC · JPL
863002	2014 SJ_{114}	—	September 2, 2014	Haleakala	Pan-STARRS 1	·	1.9 km	MPC · JPL
863003	2014 SV_{115}	—	November 13, 2007	Kitt Peak	Spacewatch	·	740 m	MPC · JPL
863004	2014 SH_{117}	—	September 18, 2014	Haleakala	Pan-STARRS 1	·	1.9 km	MPC · JPL
863005	2014 SF_{118}	—	September 21, 2003	Kitt Peak	Spacewatch	NYS	780 m	MPC · JPL
863006	2014 SP_{118}	—	September 16, 2003	Kitt Peak	Spacewatch	THM	1.7 km	MPC · JPL
863007	2014 SS_{118}	—	August 27, 2014	Haleakala	Pan-STARRS 1	·	2.3 km	MPC · JPL
863008	2014 SJ_{119}	—	October 18, 2009	Mount Lemmon	Mount Lemmon Survey	·	1.6 km	MPC · JPL
863009	2014 SN_{120}	—	March 19, 2013	Haleakala	Pan-STARRS 1	·	810 m	MPC · JPL
863010	2014 SC_{124}	—	September 26, 2003	Sacramento Peak	SDSS	MAS	540 m	MPC · JPL
863011	2014 SN_{124}	—	August 25, 2003	Cerro Tololo	Deep Ecliptic Survey	·	1.3 km	MPC · JPL
863012	2014 SX_{124}	—	August 25, 2014	Haleakala	Pan-STARRS 1	·	1.6 km	MPC · JPL
863013	2014 SF_{125}	—	August 25, 2014	Haleakala	Pan-STARRS 1	·	1.8 km	MPC · JPL
863014	2014 SM_{125}	—	September 18, 2014	Haleakala	Pan-STARRS 1	·	2.1 km	MPC · JPL
863015	2014 SH_{126}	—	September 18, 2014	Haleakala	Pan-STARRS 1	·	1.1 km	MPC · JPL
863016	2014 SG_{127}	—	September 18, 2014	Haleakala	Pan-STARRS 1	·	1.4 km	MPC · JPL
863017	2014 SN_{131}	—	September 17, 2010	Kitt Peak	Spacewatch	·	670 m	MPC · JPL
863018	2014 SX_{133}	—	September 5, 2010	Mount Lemmon	Mount Lemmon Survey	·	910 m	MPC · JPL
863019	2014 SJ_{134}	—	March 3, 2011	Mount Lemmon	Mount Lemmon Survey	·	1.7 km	MPC · JPL
863020	2014 SD_{135}	—	September 18, 2014	Haleakala	Pan-STARRS 1	·	2.3 km	MPC · JPL
863021	2014 SH_{137}	—	September 3, 2014	Kitt Peak	Spacewatch	·	1.7 km	MPC · JPL
863022	2014 SV_{137}	—	September 19, 2014	Haleakala	Pan-STARRS 1	·	700 m	MPC · JPL
863023	2014 SH_{138}	—	September 19, 2014	Haleakala	Pan-STARRS 1	THM	1.8 km	MPC · JPL
863024	2014 SK_{138}	—	May 9, 2013	Haleakala	Pan-STARRS 1	·	1.2 km	MPC · JPL
863025	2014 SP_{138}	—	March 4, 2008	Kitt Peak	Spacewatch	·	1.3 km	MPC · JPL
863026	2014 SW_{138}	—	September 27, 2003	Kitt Peak	Spacewatch	·	1.6 km	MPC · JPL
863027	2014 SG_{139}	—	October 18, 2009	Mount Lemmon	Mount Lemmon Survey	·	1.9 km	MPC · JPL
863028	2014 SU_{139}	—	September 19, 2014	Haleakala	Pan-STARRS 1	MAS	530 m	MPC · JPL
863029	2014 SW_{139}	—	November 5, 2007	Kitt Peak	Spacewatch	·	700 m	MPC · JPL
863030	2014 SP_{141}	—	July 1, 2014	Mount Lemmon	Mount Lemmon Survey	·	1.5 km	MPC · JPL
863031	2014 SB_{142}	—	May 27, 2008	Mount Lemmon	Mount Lemmon Survey	H	420 m	MPC · JPL
863032	2014 SA_{144}	—	September 20, 2014	Haleakala	Pan-STARRS 1	H	340 m	MPC · JPL
863033	2014 SX_{144}	—	January 25, 2004	Haleakala	NEAT	·	770 m	MPC · JPL
863034	2014 SR_{147}	—	July 30, 2014	Haleakala	Pan-STARRS 1	·	1.2 km	MPC · JPL
863035	2014 SP_{156}	—	September 19, 2014	Haleakala	Pan-STARRS 1	NYS	820 m	MPC · JPL
863036	2014 SS_{156}	—	February 3, 2012	Haleakala	Pan-STARRS 1	MAS	630 m	MPC · JPL
863037	2014 SA_{157}	—	January 3, 2012	Kitt Peak	Spacewatch	·	480 m	MPC · JPL
863038	2014 ST_{158}	—	September 2, 2014	Haleakala	Pan-STARRS 1	·	2.7 km	MPC · JPL
863039	2014 SU_{158}	—	December 17, 2007	Kitt Peak	Spacewatch	NYS	770 m	MPC · JPL
863040	2014 SR_{159}	—	September 19, 2014	Haleakala	Pan-STARRS 1	·	520 m	MPC · JPL
863041	2014 SP_{161}	—	August 25, 2014	Haleakala	Pan-STARRS 1	3:2 · SHU	3.8 km	MPC · JPL
863042	2014 SX_{161}	—	April 20, 2007	Kitt Peak	Spacewatch	·	490 m	MPC · JPL
863043	2014 SJ_{162}	—	August 27, 2014	Haleakala	Pan-STARRS 1	EMA	2.2 km	MPC · JPL
863044	2014 ST_{162}	—	September 19, 2014	Haleakala	Pan-STARRS 1	·	1.6 km	MPC · JPL
863045	2014 SM_{163}	—	August 27, 2014	Haleakala	Pan-STARRS 1	H	380 m	MPC · JPL
863046	2014 SL_{164}	—	September 19, 2014	Haleakala	Pan-STARRS 1	·	2.1 km	MPC · JPL
863047	2014 SQ_{164}	—	November 26, 2011	Mount Lemmon	Mount Lemmon Survey	·	480 m	MPC · JPL
863048	2014 SV_{164}	—	August 27, 2014	Haleakala	Pan-STARRS 1	·	520 m	MPC · JPL
863049	2014 SD_{165}	—	September 19, 2014	Haleakala	Pan-STARRS 1	MAS	590 m	MPC · JPL
863050	2014 SE_{165}	—	September 28, 2003	Kitt Peak	Spacewatch	MAS	590 m	MPC · JPL
863051	2014 SQ_{166}	—	September 19, 2014	Haleakala	Pan-STARRS 1	·	1.2 km	MPC · JPL
863052	2014 SJ_{167}	—	August 20, 2014	Haleakala	Pan-STARRS 1	·	1.5 km	MPC · JPL
863053	2014 SE_{168}	—	September 20, 2014	Haleakala	Pan-STARRS 1	·	2.2 km	MPC · JPL
863054	2014 SR_{168}	—	September 20, 2014	Haleakala	Pan-STARRS 1	H	300 m	MPC · JPL
863055	2014 SC_{169}	—	August 29, 2014	Haleakala	Pan-STARRS 1	TIR	2.4 km	MPC · JPL
863056	2014 SP_{170}	—	August 29, 2014	Haleakala	Pan-STARRS 1	·	2.0 km	MPC · JPL
863057	2014 SP_{171}	—	July 4, 2014	Haleakala	Pan-STARRS 1	·	1.7 km	MPC · JPL
863058	2014 SS_{171}	—	August 29, 2014	Kitt Peak	Spacewatch	THM	1.4 km	MPC · JPL
863059	2014 SH_{172}	—	March 16, 2012	Mount Lemmon	Mount Lemmon Survey	EOS	1.3 km	MPC · JPL
863060	2014 SM_{172}	—	October 23, 2003	Sacramento Peak	SDSS	NYS	680 m	MPC · JPL
863061	2014 SY_{172}	—	September 20, 2014	Haleakala	Pan-STARRS 1	·	1.6 km	MPC · JPL
863062	2014 SB_{173}	—	February 26, 2012	Mount Lemmon	Mount Lemmon Survey	·	2.2 km	MPC · JPL
863063	2014 SW_{173}	—	August 27, 2014	Haleakala	Pan-STARRS 1	·	1.0 km	MPC · JPL
863064	2014 SC_{174}	—	August 27, 2014	Haleakala	Pan-STARRS 1	V	420 m	MPC · JPL
863065	2014 SE_{174}	—	August 27, 2014	Haleakala	Pan-STARRS 1	·	790 m	MPC · JPL
863066	2014 SN_{176}	—	August 27, 2014	Haleakala	Pan-STARRS 1	·	650 m	MPC · JPL
863067	2014 SJ_{177}	—	August 31, 2000	Kitt Peak	Spacewatch	·	1.3 km	MPC · JPL
863068	2014 SK_{180}	—	June 8, 2013	Mount Lemmon	Mount Lemmon Survey	·	1.7 km	MPC · JPL
863069	2014 SR_{182}	—	March 23, 2012	Mount Lemmon	Mount Lemmon Survey	·	2.2 km	MPC · JPL
863070	2014 SL_{185}	—	September 20, 2014	Haleakala	Pan-STARRS 1	·	2.2 km	MPC · JPL
863071	2014 SJ_{188}	—	September 20, 2014	Haleakala	Pan-STARRS 1	HYG	1.8 km	MPC · JPL
863072	2014 SN_{188}	—	October 18, 2001	Palomar	NEAT	·	430 m	MPC · JPL
863073	2014 SF_{190}	—	August 27, 2014	Haleakala	Pan-STARRS 1	·	850 m	MPC · JPL
863074	2014 SL_{190}	—	March 3, 2006	Kitt Peak	Spacewatch	·	2.2 km	MPC · JPL
863075	2014 SB_{191}	—	July 31, 2014	Haleakala	Pan-STARRS 1	·	560 m	MPC · JPL
863076	2014 SV_{192}	—	September 20, 2014	Haleakala	Pan-STARRS 1	EOS	1.2 km	MPC · JPL
863077	2014 SB_{193}	—	September 20, 2014	Haleakala	Pan-STARRS 1	EOS	1.1 km	MPC · JPL
863078	2014 SG_{193}	—	September 20, 2014	Haleakala	Pan-STARRS 1	·	1.7 km	MPC · JPL
863079	2014 SD_{194}	—	October 17, 2007	Mount Lemmon	Mount Lemmon Survey	·	640 m	MPC · JPL
863080	2014 SN_{201}	—	September 20, 2014	Haleakala	Pan-STARRS 1	·	770 m	MPC · JPL
863081	2014 SA_{202}	—	September 28, 2009	Mount Lemmon	Mount Lemmon Survey	·	1.4 km	MPC · JPL
863082	2014 SD_{205}	—	August 30, 2014	Catalina	CSS	JUN	670 m	MPC · JPL
863083	2014 SE_{205}	—	August 31, 2014	Mount Lemmon	Mount Lemmon Survey	·	800 m	MPC · JPL
863084	2014 SR_{206}	—	September 5, 2010	Mount Lemmon	Mount Lemmon Survey	MAS	580 m	MPC · JPL
863085	2014 SU_{208}	—	August 31, 2014	Haleakala	Pan-STARRS 1	·	2.2 km	MPC · JPL
863086	2014 SE_{209}	—	October 23, 2003	Sacramento Peak	SDSS	·	750 m	MPC · JPL
863087	2014 SF_{211}	—	September 20, 2014	Haleakala	Pan-STARRS 1	·	2.3 km	MPC · JPL
863088	2014 SK_{211}	—	November 29, 2003	Kitt Peak	Spacewatch	·	1.9 km	MPC · JPL
863089	2014 SL_{211}	—	September 4, 2014	Haleakala	Pan-STARRS 1	·	1.4 km	MPC · JPL
863090	2014 SE_{212}	—	April 21, 2012	Mount Lemmon	Mount Lemmon Survey	·	1.1 km	MPC · JPL
863091	2014 SO_{212}	—	September 20, 2014	Haleakala	Pan-STARRS 1	·	1.3 km	MPC · JPL
863092	2014 SZ_{212}	—	November 26, 2003	Kitt Peak	Spacewatch	TIR	2.0 km	MPC · JPL
863093	2014 SF_{213}	—	November 19, 2005	Palomar	NEAT	·	1.2 km	MPC · JPL
863094	2014 SK_{213}	—	November 26, 2003	Kitt Peak	Spacewatch	·	1.9 km	MPC · JPL
863095	2014 SX_{214}	—	November 28, 1997	Kitt Peak	Spacewatch	·	2.1 km	MPC · JPL
863096	2014 SU_{215}	—	September 4, 2014	Haleakala	Pan-STARRS 1	·	1.0 km	MPC · JPL
863097	2014 SM_{219}	—	September 20, 2014	Haleakala	Pan-STARRS 1	THB	2.7 km	MPC · JPL
863098	2014 SQ_{219}	—	September 20, 2014	Haleakala	Pan-STARRS 1	·	2.7 km	MPC · JPL
863099	2014 SD_{220}	—	September 20, 2014	Haleakala	Pan-STARRS 1	H	350 m	MPC · JPL
863100	2014 ST_{220}	—	October 2, 2013	Haleakala	Pan-STARRS 1	L5	5.8 km	MPC · JPL

== 863101–863200 ==
back to top

Designation			Discovery			Properties		Ref
Permanent	Provisional	Named after	Date	Site	Discoverer(s)	Category	Diam.	Ref
863101	2014 SN_{227}	—	July 25, 2014	Haleakala	Pan-STARRS 1	·	490 m	MPC · JPL
863102	2014 SC_{228}	—	February 15, 2012	Haleakala	Pan-STARRS 1	·	860 m	MPC · JPL
863103	2014 SE_{230}	—	October 12, 2005	Kitt Peak	Spacewatch	EUN	930 m	MPC · JPL
863104	2014 SO_{230}	—	September 14, 2014	Mount Lemmon	Mount Lemmon Survey	·	470 m	MPC · JPL
863105	2014 SH_{231}	—	September 19, 2014	Haleakala	Pan-STARRS 1	THM	1.5 km	MPC · JPL
863106	2014 SW_{231}	—	March 19, 2013	Haleakala	Pan-STARRS 1	NYS	1.0 km	MPC · JPL
863107	2014 SM_{232}	—	March 16, 2013	Kitt Peak	Spacewatch	H	330 m	MPC · JPL
863108	2014 SO_{232}	—	September 19, 2014	Haleakala	Pan-STARRS 1	·	1.2 km	MPC · JPL
863109	2014 SE_{233}	—	September 19, 2014	Haleakala	Pan-STARRS 1	·	1.9 km	MPC · JPL
863110	2014 SU_{235}	—	January 31, 2009	Kitt Peak	Spacewatch	·	1.0 km	MPC · JPL
863111	2014 SG_{236}	—	November 8, 2007	Mount Lemmon	Mount Lemmon Survey	·	920 m	MPC · JPL
863112	2014 SU_{236}	—	September 20, 2014	Haleakala	Pan-STARRS 1	VER	2.2 km	MPC · JPL
863113	2014 SN_{238}	—	June 3, 2014	Haleakala	Pan-STARRS 1	·	1.4 km	MPC · JPL
863114	2014 SG_{239}	—	June 29, 2014	Haleakala	Pan-STARRS 1	·	400 m	MPC · JPL
863115	2014 SU_{240}	—	March 15, 2013	Kitt Peak	Spacewatch	·	2.1 km	MPC · JPL
863116	2014 SH_{242}	—	August 30, 2014	Haleakala	Pan-STARRS 1	T_{j} (2.94)	2.9 km	MPC · JPL
863117	2014 SM_{242}	—	August 27, 2014	Haleakala	Pan-STARRS 1	·	720 m	MPC · JPL
863118	2014 SR_{242}	—	August 27, 2014	Haleakala	Pan-STARRS 1	·	1.4 km	MPC · JPL
863119	2014 SD_{243}	—	July 31, 2014	Haleakala	Pan-STARRS 1	·	1.4 km	MPC · JPL
863120	2014 SN_{243}	—	August 23, 2014	Haleakala	Pan-STARRS 1	·	1.9 km	MPC · JPL
863121	2014 SR_{243}	—	August 22, 2014	Haleakala	Pan-STARRS 1	EOS	1.4 km	MPC · JPL
863122	2014 SD_{245}	—	September 22, 2014	Haleakala	Pan-STARRS 1	·	2.0 km	MPC · JPL
863123	2014 SZ_{249}	—	September 22, 2014	Haleakala	Pan-STARRS 1	WIT	710 m	MPC · JPL
863124	2014 SB_{250}	—	August 20, 2014	Haleakala	Pan-STARRS 1	·	820 m	MPC · JPL
863125	2014 SC_{250}	—	December 13, 2006	Mount Lemmon	Mount Lemmon Survey	·	920 m	MPC · JPL
863126	2014 SP_{250}	—	September 23, 2014	Mount Lemmon	Mount Lemmon Survey	·	2.4 km	MPC · JPL
863127	2014 SC_{252}	—	September 2, 2014	Haleakala	Pan-STARRS 1	VER	1.9 km	MPC · JPL
863128	2014 SO_{252}	—	September 2, 2014	Haleakala	Pan-STARRS 1	·	1.7 km	MPC · JPL
863129	2014 SV_{252}	—	August 31, 2014	Kitt Peak	Spacewatch	·	860 m	MPC · JPL
863130	2014 SX_{252}	—	September 2, 2014	Haleakala	Pan-STARRS 1	·	2.5 km	MPC · JPL
863131	2014 SR_{255}	—	January 18, 2009	Kitt Peak	Spacewatch	·	430 m	MPC · JPL
863132	2014 SC_{256}	—	July 29, 2014	Haleakala	Pan-STARRS 1	NYS	960 m	MPC · JPL
863133	2014 SN_{257}	—	August 5, 2010	Kitt Peak	Spacewatch	·	870 m	MPC · JPL
863134	2014 SY_{257}	—	September 23, 2014	Haleakala	Pan-STARRS 1	T_{j} (2.98) · 3:2 · SHU	3.7 km	MPC · JPL
863135	2014 SD_{258}	—	August 30, 2014	Haleakala	Pan-STARRS 1	·	2.5 km	MPC · JPL
863136	2014 SR_{258}	—	September 24, 2014	Roque de los Muchachos	EURONEAR	THM	1.5 km	MPC · JPL
863137	2014 SZ_{258}	—	October 29, 2010	Kitt Peak	Spacewatch	·	1.2 km	MPC · JPL
863138	2014 SD_{260}	—	September 22, 2014	Haleakala	Pan-STARRS 1	H	320 m	MPC · JPL
863139	2014 SG_{262}	—	September 2, 2014	Haleakala	Pan-STARRS 1	·	700 m	MPC · JPL
863140	2014 SW_{262}	—	July 3, 2005	Mount Lemmon	Mount Lemmon Survey	·	1.1 km	MPC · JPL
863141	2014 SW_{263}	—	August 24, 2014	Kitt Peak	Spacewatch	JUN	740 m	MPC · JPL
863142	2014 SE_{267}	—	August 27, 2014	Haleakala	Pan-STARRS 1	VER	1.9 km	MPC · JPL
863143	2014 SJ_{267}	—	August 27, 2014	Haleakala	Pan-STARRS 1	·	460 m	MPC · JPL
863144	2014 SN_{270}	—	December 1, 2010	Mount Lemmon	Mount Lemmon Survey	·	1.1 km	MPC · JPL
863145	2014 SC_{271}	—	September 20, 2014	Haleakala	Pan-STARRS 1	NYS	790 m	MPC · JPL
863146	2014 SD_{271}	—	September 2, 2014	Kitt Peak	Spacewatch	·	2.2 km	MPC · JPL
863147	2014 SU_{271}	—	September 26, 2009	Kitt Peak	Spacewatch	EOS	1.1 km	MPC · JPL
863148	2014 SC_{273}	—	November 8, 2009	Mount Lemmon	Mount Lemmon Survey	THM	1.3 km	MPC · JPL
863149	2014 SX_{273}	—	April 9, 2010	Kitt Peak	Spacewatch	·	420 m	MPC · JPL
863150	2014 SX_{277}	—	September 15, 2014	Mount Lemmon	Mount Lemmon Survey	·	1.9 km	MPC · JPL
863151	2014 SC_{278}	—	September 22, 2014	ESA OGS	ESA OGS	·	910 m	MPC · JPL
863152	2014 SA_{279}	—	November 3, 2007	Kitt Peak	Spacewatch	·	760 m	MPC · JPL
863153	2014 SA_{281}	—	August 25, 2014	Haleakala	Pan-STARRS 1	·	540 m	MPC · JPL
863154	2014 SZ_{283}	—	September 23, 2014	Mount Lemmon	Mount Lemmon Survey	·	2.1 km	MPC · JPL
863155	2014 SN_{284}	—	March 5, 2013	Haleakala	Pan-STARRS 1	·	480 m	MPC · JPL
863156	2014 SQ_{284}	—	January 14, 2008	Kitt Peak	Spacewatch	·	1.0 km	MPC · JPL
863157	2014 SC_{286}	—	September 18, 2003	Kitt Peak	Spacewatch	·	1.7 km	MPC · JPL
863158	2014 SQ_{286}	—	September 14, 2014	Haleakala	Pan-STARRS 1	·	1.4 km	MPC · JPL
863159	2014 SQ_{287}	—	September 18, 2003	Palomar	NEAT	·	2.3 km	MPC · JPL
863160	2014 SS_{287}	—	September 14, 2014	Mount Lemmon	Mount Lemmon Survey	·	950 m	MPC · JPL
863161	2014 ST_{287}	—	September 19, 2014	Haleakala	Pan-STARRS 1	NYS	770 m	MPC · JPL
863162	2014 SD_{290}	—	August 6, 2014	Haleakala	Pan-STARRS 1	·	2.4 km	MPC · JPL
863163	2014 SS_{290}	—	September 24, 2014	Mount Lemmon	Mount Lemmon Survey	EOS	1.2 km	MPC · JPL
863164	2014 SU_{290}	—	June 29, 2014	Mount Lemmon	Mount Lemmon Survey	·	1.8 km	MPC · JPL
863165	2014 SZ_{290}	—	January 4, 2011	Mount Lemmon	Mount Lemmon Survey	·	1.2 km	MPC · JPL
863166	2014 SH_{291}	—	September 24, 2014	Mount Lemmon	Mount Lemmon Survey	·	390 m	MPC · JPL
863167	2014 SN_{291}	—	March 23, 2013	Mount Lemmon	Mount Lemmon Survey	·	1.3 km	MPC · JPL
863168	2014 SV_{291}	—	August 28, 2014	Haleakala	Pan-STARRS 1	·	510 m	MPC · JPL
863169	2014 SC_{292}	—	November 12, 2010	Mount Lemmon	Mount Lemmon Survey	·	1.3 km	MPC · JPL
863170	2014 SW_{292}	—	August 31, 2014	Haleakala	Pan-STARRS 1	·	490 m	MPC · JPL
863171	2014 SS_{293}	—	September 4, 2014	Haleakala	Pan-STARRS 1	TIR	1.8 km	MPC · JPL
863172	2014 SU_{293}	—	September 25, 2014	Mount Lemmon	Mount Lemmon Survey	·	2.4 km	MPC · JPL
863173	2014 SU_{294}	—	September 25, 2014	Mount Lemmon	Mount Lemmon Survey	·	2.2 km	MPC · JPL
863174	2014 SZ_{296}	—	November 9, 2007	Mount Lemmon	Mount Lemmon Survey	·	950 m	MPC · JPL
863175	2014 SK_{297}	—	October 30, 2007	Mount Lemmon	Mount Lemmon Survey	·	630 m	MPC · JPL
863176	2014 SX_{298}	—	September 25, 2014	Kitt Peak	Spacewatch	·	1.0 km	MPC · JPL
863177	2014 SW_{299}	—	September 25, 2014	Kitt Peak	Spacewatch	·	2.4 km	MPC · JPL
863178	2014 SR_{301}	—	September 24, 2014	Mount Lemmon	Mount Lemmon Survey	·	1.5 km	MPC · JPL
863179	2014 SA_{302}	—	January 18, 2005	Kitt Peak	Spacewatch	TIR	2.2 km	MPC · JPL
863180	2014 SE_{304}	—	September 28, 2014	Haleakala	Pan-STARRS 1	H	390 m	MPC · JPL
863181	2014 SH_{304}	—	October 13, 2001	Kitt Peak	Spacewatch	·	1.1 km	MPC · JPL
863182	2014 SU_{304}	—	September 23, 2014	Mount Lemmon	Mount Lemmon Survey	·	2.0 km	MPC · JPL
863183	2014 SF_{305}	—	September 19, 2014	Haleakala	Pan-STARRS 1	·	760 m	MPC · JPL
863184	2014 SL_{307}	—	October 9, 1993	Kitt Peak	Spacewatch	·	900 m	MPC · JPL
863185	2014 SY_{307}	—	September 24, 2014	Mount Lemmon	Mount Lemmon Survey	·	2.7 km	MPC · JPL
863186	2014 SG_{312}	—	August 28, 2014	Haleakala	Pan-STARRS 1	·	2.4 km	MPC · JPL
863187	2014 SH_{312}	—	October 18, 2004	Kitt Peak	Deep Ecliptic Survey	·	520 m	MPC · JPL
863188	2014 SR_{312}	—	October 18, 2003	Kitt Peak	Spacewatch	THM	1.7 km	MPC · JPL
863189	2014 SU_{312}	—	September 28, 2003	Kitt Peak	Spacewatch	V	360 m	MPC · JPL
863190	2014 SW_{312}	—	September 26, 2014	Kitt Peak	Spacewatch	VER	2.2 km	MPC · JPL
863191	2014 SE_{313}	—	September 15, 2014	Mount Lemmon	Mount Lemmon Survey	H	380 m	MPC · JPL
863192	2014 SD_{315}	—	October 29, 2003	Kitt Peak	Spacewatch	NYS	820 m	MPC · JPL
863193	2014 SV_{315}	—	September 26, 2014	Kitt Peak	Spacewatch	·	910 m	MPC · JPL
863194	2014 SZ_{315}	—	September 26, 2014	Kitt Peak	Spacewatch	·	2.5 km	MPC · JPL
863195	2014 SE_{316}	—	October 12, 2007	Mount Lemmon	Mount Lemmon Survey	·	820 m	MPC · JPL
863196	2014 SX_{317}	—	August 25, 2014	Haleakala	Pan-STARRS 1	·	1.9 km	MPC · JPL
863197	2014 SH_{319}	—	September 19, 2014	Haleakala	Pan-STARRS 1	·	1.2 km	MPC · JPL
863198	2014 SK_{319}	—	June 20, 2010	Mount Lemmon	Mount Lemmon Survey	MAS	560 m	MPC · JPL
863199	2014 SV_{319}	—	September 29, 2014	Haleakala	Pan-STARRS 1	·	880 m	MPC · JPL
863200	2014 SQ_{320}	—	September 29, 2014	Haleakala	Pan-STARRS 1	·	680 m	MPC · JPL

== 863201–863300 ==
back to top

Designation			Discovery			Properties		Ref
Permanent	Provisional	Named after	Date	Site	Discoverer(s)	Category	Diam.	Ref
863201	2014 SE_{321}	—	September 13, 2007	Catalina	CSS	PHO	780 m	MPC · JPL
863202	2014 SN_{321}	—	October 18, 2007	Kitt Peak	Spacewatch	·	700 m	MPC · JPL
863203	2014 SU_{322}	—	August 25, 2014	Haleakala	Pan-STARRS 1	·	1.5 km	MPC · JPL
863204	2014 SJ_{323}	—	August 25, 2014	Haleakala	Pan-STARRS 1	·	840 m	MPC · JPL
863205	2014 SK_{324}	—	August 27, 2014	Haleakala	Pan-STARRS 1	·	1.2 km	MPC · JPL
863206	2014 SY_{327}	—	September 26, 2014	Kitt Peak	Spacewatch	·	2.1 km	MPC · JPL
863207	2014 SO_{329}	—	August 31, 2014	Haleakala	Pan-STARRS 1	·	1.5 km	MPC · JPL
863208	2014 SK_{333}	—	September 29, 2014	Haleakala	Pan-STARRS 1	THM	1.9 km	MPC · JPL
863209	2014 SR_{335}	—	September 30, 2014	Mount Lemmon	Mount Lemmon Survey	EOS	1.1 km	MPC · JPL
863210	2014 SC_{340}	—	September 19, 2014	Haleakala	Pan-STARRS 1	·	1.7 km	MPC · JPL
863211	2014 SL_{345}	—	September 29, 2014	Haleakala	Pan-STARRS 1	H	310 m	MPC · JPL
863212	2014 SK_{347}	—	September 2, 2014	Haleakala	Pan-STARRS 1	·	1.8 km	MPC · JPL
863213	2014 SH_{348}	—	September 14, 2002	Palomar Mountain	NEAT	·	2.1 km	MPC · JPL
863214	2014 SA_{351}	—	March 5, 2013	Haleakala	Pan-STARRS 1	H	410 m	MPC · JPL
863215	2014 SC_{351}	—	October 25, 2014	Haleakala	Pan-STARRS 1	H	330 m	MPC · JPL
863216	2014 SM_{351}	—	September 29, 2014	Haleakala	Pan-STARRS 1	H	330 m	MPC · JPL
863217	2014 SR_{351}	—	September 20, 2014	Haleakala	Pan-STARRS 1	H	330 m	MPC · JPL
863218	2014 SB_{352}	—	September 18, 2014	Haleakala	Pan-STARRS 1	·	1.9 km	MPC · JPL
863219	2014 SX_{352}	—	September 24, 2014	Catalina	CSS	·	1.8 km	MPC · JPL
863220	2014 SZ_{353}	—	October 27, 2006	Mount Lemmon	Mount Lemmon Survey	·	780 m	MPC · JPL
863221	2014 SE_{354}	—	September 19, 2014	Haleakala	Pan-STARRS 1	·	710 m	MPC · JPL
863222	2014 SL_{354}	—	September 18, 2014	Haleakala	Pan-STARRS 1	·	1.5 km	MPC · JPL
863223	2014 SX_{354}	—	September 19, 2014	Haleakala	Pan-STARRS 1	·	2.3 km	MPC · JPL
863224	2014 SJ_{356}	—	September 18, 2003	Kitt Peak	Spacewatch	·	1.9 km	MPC · JPL
863225	2014 SK_{356}	—	September 22, 2014	Desert Eagle	W. K. Y. Yeung	EOS	1.5 km	MPC · JPL
863226	2014 SU_{357}	—	September 19, 2014	Haleakala	Pan-STARRS 1	·	1.6 km	MPC · JPL
863227	2014 SR_{361}	—	September 22, 2014	Haleakala	Pan-STARRS 1	·	2.8 km	MPC · JPL
863228	2014 ST_{361}	—	September 23, 2014	Haleakala	Pan-STARRS 1	·	890 m	MPC · JPL
863229	2014 SY_{361}	—	September 15, 2009	Kitt Peak	Spacewatch	EOS	1.3 km	MPC · JPL
863230	2014 SA_{362}	—	September 24, 2014	Kitt Peak	Spacewatch	LIX	2.3 km	MPC · JPL
863231	2014 SB_{362}	—	September 24, 2014	Kitt Peak	Spacewatch	·	2.6 km	MPC · JPL
863232	2014 SR_{362}	—	September 25, 2014	Kitt Peak	Spacewatch	TIR	2.2 km	MPC · JPL
863233	2014 SZ_{362}	—	May 9, 2013	Haleakala	Pan-STARRS 1	·	1.2 km	MPC · JPL
863234	2014 SH_{363}	—	September 30, 2014	Mount Lemmon	Mount Lemmon Survey	·	2.1 km	MPC · JPL
863235	2014 SQ_{364}	—	September 19, 2014	Haleakala	Pan-STARRS 1	·	820 m	MPC · JPL
863236	2014 SS_{364}	—	September 22, 2014	Haleakala	Pan-STARRS 1	EOS	1.5 km	MPC · JPL
863237	2014 SP_{365}	—	September 18, 2014	Haleakala	Pan-STARRS 1	L5	7.5 km	MPC · JPL
863238	2014 SV_{365}	—	September 19, 2014	Haleakala	Pan-STARRS 1	·	2.0 km	MPC · JPL
863239	2014 SG_{366}	—	September 19, 2014	Haleakala	Pan-STARRS 1	·	840 m	MPC · JPL
863240	2014 SP_{366}	—	September 20, 2014	Haleakala	Pan-STARRS 1	·	2.3 km	MPC · JPL
863241	2014 SY_{366}	—	September 24, 2014	Kitt Peak	Spacewatch	·	2.0 km	MPC · JPL
863242	2014 SB_{367}	—	September 19, 2014	Haleakala	Pan-STARRS 1	·	1.9 km	MPC · JPL
863243	2014 SK_{367}	—	September 29, 2014	Haleakala	Pan-STARRS 1	VER	1.7 km	MPC · JPL
863244	2014 SQ_{367}	—	September 20, 2014	Haleakala	Pan-STARRS 1	H	290 m	MPC · JPL
863245	2014 SU_{367}	—	September 18, 2014	Haleakala	Pan-STARRS 1	H	410 m	MPC · JPL
863246	2014 SW_{368}	—	September 24, 2014	Kitt Peak	Spacewatch	NYS	720 m	MPC · JPL
863247	2014 SJ_{370}	—	September 20, 2014	Haleakala	Pan-STARRS 1	·	1.6 km	MPC · JPL
863248	2014 SL_{370}	—	September 29, 2014	Haleakala	Pan-STARRS 1	·	2.5 km	MPC · JPL
863249	2014 SW_{370}	—	September 20, 2014	Haleakala	Pan-STARRS 1	PHO	560 m	MPC · JPL
863250	2014 SK_{372}	—	September 19, 2014	Haleakala	Pan-STARRS 1	THM	1.5 km	MPC · JPL
863251	2014 SL_{372}	—	September 19, 2014	Haleakala	Pan-STARRS 1	·	2.1 km	MPC · JPL
863252	2014 SY_{372}	—	June 17, 2010	Mount Lemmon	Mount Lemmon Survey	NYS	950 m	MPC · JPL
863253	2014 SM_{374}	—	May 14, 2018	Mount Lemmon	Mount Lemmon Survey	EOS	1.4 km	MPC · JPL
863254	2014 SN_{374}	—	July 29, 2008	Kitt Peak	Spacewatch	THM	1.6 km	MPC · JPL
863255	2014 SP_{374}	—	November 20, 2015	Mount Lemmon	Mount Lemmon Survey	·	2.1 km	MPC · JPL
863256	2014 SQ_{374}	—	January 31, 2017	Haleakala	Pan-STARRS 1	ARM	2.4 km	MPC · JPL
863257	2014 SS_{374}	—	September 23, 2015	Haleakala	Pan-STARRS 1	·	1.8 km	MPC · JPL
863258	2014 ST_{374}	—	September 19, 2014	Haleakala	Pan-STARRS 1	·	1.8 km	MPC · JPL
863259	2014 SU_{374}	—	September 19, 2014	Haleakala	Pan-STARRS 1	EOS	1.4 km	MPC · JPL
863260	2014 SX_{374}	—	September 20, 2014	Haleakala	Pan-STARRS 1	·	1.9 km	MPC · JPL
863261	2014 SD_{375}	—	September 22, 2014	Kitt Peak	Spacewatch	·	2.1 km	MPC · JPL
863262	2014 SJ_{375}	—	September 20, 2014	Haleakala	Pan-STARRS 1	VER	1.6 km	MPC · JPL
863263	2014 SP_{375}	—	September 20, 2014	Haleakala	Pan-STARRS 1	·	1.9 km	MPC · JPL
863264	2014 SH_{376}	—	September 20, 2014	Haleakala	Pan-STARRS 1	·	2.2 km	MPC · JPL
863265	2014 SF_{377}	—	September 19, 2014	Haleakala	Pan-STARRS 1	·	2.0 km	MPC · JPL
863266	2014 SX_{377}	—	September 26, 2014	Kitt Peak	Spacewatch	MAS	700 m	MPC · JPL
863267	2014 SN_{378}	—	September 26, 2014	Catalina	CSS	·	1.3 km	MPC · JPL
863268	2014 SM_{379}	—	September 19, 2014	Haleakala	Pan-STARRS 1	·	1.4 km	MPC · JPL
863269	2014 SP_{380}	—	September 25, 2014	Mount Lemmon	Mount Lemmon Survey	·	1.1 km	MPC · JPL
863270	2014 SK_{381}	—	September 19, 2014	Haleakala	Pan-STARRS 1	·	1.0 km	MPC · JPL
863271	2014 SD_{382}	—	September 17, 2014	Haleakala	Pan-STARRS 1	·	1.9 km	MPC · JPL
863272	2014 SR_{383}	—	September 19, 2014	Haleakala	Pan-STARRS 1	·	2.0 km	MPC · JPL
863273	2014 SH_{384}	—	June 17, 2010	Mount Lemmon	Mount Lemmon Survey	MAS	570 m	MPC · JPL
863274	2014 SJ_{384}	—	September 19, 2014	Haleakala	Pan-STARRS 1	·	850 m	MPC · JPL
863275	2014 SN_{384}	—	November 8, 2009	Mount Lemmon	Mount Lemmon Survey	EOS	1.3 km	MPC · JPL
863276	2014 SW_{384}	—	September 25, 2014	Mount Lemmon	Mount Lemmon Survey	·	820 m	MPC · JPL
863277	2014 SX_{384}	—	September 19, 2014	Haleakala	Pan-STARRS 1	·	460 m	MPC · JPL
863278	2014 SA_{385}	—	September 23, 2014	Mount Lemmon	Mount Lemmon Survey	·	910 m	MPC · JPL
863279	2014 SZ_{385}	—	January 14, 2008	Kitt Peak	Spacewatch	·	680 m	MPC · JPL
863280	2014 SD_{386}	—	September 19, 2014	Haleakala	Pan-STARRS 1	HYG	1.8 km	MPC · JPL
863281	2014 SE_{387}	—	September 19, 2014	Haleakala	Pan-STARRS 1	·	2.2 km	MPC · JPL
863282	2014 SF_{387}	—	September 29, 2014	Haleakala	Pan-STARRS 1	·	2.5 km	MPC · JPL
863283	2014 SZ_{387}	—	September 18, 2014	Haleakala	Pan-STARRS 1	·	2.3 km	MPC · JPL
863284	2014 SA_{388}	—	September 19, 2014	Haleakala	Pan-STARRS 1	·	2.2 km	MPC · JPL
863285	2014 SC_{388}	—	September 19, 2014	Haleakala	Pan-STARRS 1	(3025)	2.7 km	MPC · JPL
863286	2014 SH_{388}	—	September 24, 2014	Haleakala	Pan-STARRS 1	EUP	2.5 km	MPC · JPL
863287	2014 SK_{388}	—	January 13, 2008	Mount Lemmon	Mount Lemmon Survey	·	780 m	MPC · JPL
863288	2014 SV_{388}	—	September 19, 2014	Haleakala	Pan-STARRS 1	ELF	2.6 km	MPC · JPL
863289	2014 SW_{388}	—	September 23, 2014	Mount Lemmon	Mount Lemmon Survey	·	2.3 km	MPC · JPL
863290	2014 SH_{389}	—	September 20, 2014	Haleakala	Pan-STARRS 1	·	1.9 km	MPC · JPL
863291	2014 SK_{389}	—	September 19, 2014	Haleakala	Pan-STARRS 1	THM	1.7 km	MPC · JPL
863292	2014 SQ_{389}	—	September 16, 2014	Haleakala	Pan-STARRS 1	EOS	1.4 km	MPC · JPL
863293	2014 SC_{390}	—	September 23, 2014	Mount Lemmon	Mount Lemmon Survey	·	2.0 km	MPC · JPL
863294	2014 SO_{390}	—	September 19, 2014	Haleakala	Pan-STARRS 1	NYS	770 m	MPC · JPL
863295	2014 SP_{390}	—	September 19, 2014	Haleakala	Pan-STARRS 1	·	2.1 km	MPC · JPL
863296	2014 SU_{390}	—	September 23, 2014	Haleakala	Pan-STARRS 1	THM	1.5 km	MPC · JPL
863297	2014 SV_{390}	—	September 22, 2014	Haleakala	Pan-STARRS 1	·	510 m	MPC · JPL
863298	2014 SE_{391}	—	September 25, 2014	Mount Lemmon	Mount Lemmon Survey	·	1.9 km	MPC · JPL
863299	2014 SK_{391}	—	September 19, 2014	Haleakala	Pan-STARRS 1	·	2.1 km	MPC · JPL
863300	2014 SM_{391}	—	September 19, 2014	Haleakala	Pan-STARRS 1	·	2.0 km	MPC · JPL

== 863301–863400 ==
back to top

Designation			Discovery			Properties		Ref
Permanent	Provisional	Named after	Date	Site	Discoverer(s)	Category	Diam.	Ref
863301	2014 SP_{391}	—	September 19, 2014	Haleakala	Pan-STARRS 1	·	2.0 km	MPC · JPL
863302	2014 SS_{391}	—	September 19, 2014	Haleakala	Pan-STARRS 1	·	1.9 km	MPC · JPL
863303	2014 SV_{391}	—	September 20, 2014	Haleakala	Pan-STARRS 1	·	1.5 km	MPC · JPL
863304	2014 SW_{391}	—	September 19, 2014	Haleakala	Pan-STARRS 1	·	1.9 km	MPC · JPL
863305	2014 SZ_{391}	—	September 19, 2014	Haleakala	Pan-STARRS 1	VER	1.8 km	MPC · JPL
863306	2014 SG_{392}	—	September 18, 2014	Haleakala	Pan-STARRS 1	·	1.9 km	MPC · JPL
863307	2014 SH_{392}	—	September 18, 2014	Haleakala	Pan-STARRS 1	THM	1.1 km	MPC · JPL
863308	2014 SA_{393}	—	September 19, 2014	Haleakala	Pan-STARRS 1	·	1.6 km	MPC · JPL
863309	2014 SN_{394}	—	September 19, 2014	Haleakala	Pan-STARRS 1	LIX	2.3 km	MPC · JPL
863310	2014 SY_{394}	—	September 19, 2014	Haleakala	Pan-STARRS 1	·	1.9 km	MPC · JPL
863311	2014 SA_{395}	—	September 22, 2014	Haleakala	Pan-STARRS 1	·	2.5 km	MPC · JPL
863312	2014 SO_{395}	—	September 19, 2014	Haleakala	Pan-STARRS 1	·	950 m	MPC · JPL
863313	2014 SW_{395}	—	September 19, 2014	Haleakala	Pan-STARRS 1	H	400 m	MPC · JPL
863314	2014 SE_{396}	—	September 19, 2014	Haleakala	Pan-STARRS 1	·	810 m	MPC · JPL
863315	2014 SF_{396}	—	September 19, 2014	Haleakala	Pan-STARRS 1	·	1.4 km	MPC · JPL
863316	2014 SG_{396}	—	September 19, 2014	Haleakala	Pan-STARRS 1	·	2.0 km	MPC · JPL
863317	2014 ST_{396}	—	September 19, 2014	Haleakala	Pan-STARRS 1	·	2.0 km	MPC · JPL
863318	2014 SH_{398}	—	September 24, 2014	ESA OGS	ESA OGS	·	730 m	MPC · JPL
863319	2014 SN_{398}	—	February 5, 2011	Haleakala	Pan-STARRS 1	·	1.6 km	MPC · JPL
863320	2014 SC_{399}	—	September 24, 2014	Mount Lemmon	Mount Lemmon Survey	·	1.8 km	MPC · JPL
863321	2014 SE_{399}	—	September 19, 2014	Haleakala	Pan-STARRS 1	·	1.0 km	MPC · JPL
863322	2014 SB_{400}	—	September 20, 2014	Haleakala	Pan-STARRS 1	·	450 m	MPC · JPL
863323	2014 SF_{400}	—	September 26, 2014	Mount Lemmon	Mount Lemmon Survey	·	1.9 km	MPC · JPL
863324	2014 SC_{401}	—	September 17, 2014	Haleakala	Pan-STARRS 1	V	480 m	MPC · JPL
863325	2014 SL_{401}	—	September 22, 2014	Haleakala	Pan-STARRS 1	·	1.8 km	MPC · JPL
863326	2014 SQ_{409}	—	September 22, 2014	Kitt Peak	Spacewatch	NYS	790 m	MPC · JPL
863327	2014 SS_{409}	—	September 19, 2014	Haleakala	Pan-STARRS 1	VER	2.0 km	MPC · JPL
863328	2014 ST_{409}	—	September 20, 2014	Haleakala	Pan-STARRS 1	·	2.3 km	MPC · JPL
863329	2014 SD_{410}	—	September 22, 2014	Haleakala	Pan-STARRS 1	·	2.2 km	MPC · JPL
863330	2014 SG_{410}	—	September 23, 2014	Mount Lemmon	Mount Lemmon Survey	·	1.9 km	MPC · JPL
863331	2014 SG_{412}	—	September 17, 2014	Haleakala	Pan-STARRS 1	·	1.7 km	MPC · JPL
863332	2014 SH_{412}	—	September 19, 2014	Haleakala	Pan-STARRS 1	·	2.1 km	MPC · JPL
863333	2014 SL_{413}	—	September 19, 2014	Haleakala	Pan-STARRS 1	·	1.8 km	MPC · JPL
863334	2014 SH_{416}	—	September 18, 2014	Haleakala	Pan-STARRS 1	·	740 m	MPC · JPL
863335	2014 SZ_{416}	—	September 19, 2014	Haleakala	Pan-STARRS 1	·	2.0 km	MPC · JPL
863336	2014 SW_{419}	—	September 15, 2010	Catalina	CSS	·	1.2 km	MPC · JPL
863337	2014 SA_{422}	—	September 29, 2014	Haleakala	Pan-STARRS 1	·	1.1 km	MPC · JPL
863338	2014 SY_{422}	—	March 17, 2012	Mount Lemmon	Mount Lemmon Survey	·	1.8 km	MPC · JPL
863339	2014 SK_{424}	—	September 17, 2014	Haleakala	Pan-STARRS 1	·	2.3 km	MPC · JPL
863340	2014 SL_{424}	—	September 19, 2014	Haleakala	Pan-STARRS 1	·	1.9 km	MPC · JPL
863341	2014 SX_{424}	—	September 18, 2014	Haleakala	Pan-STARRS 1	·	2.2 km	MPC · JPL
863342	2014 SK_{433}	—	September 19, 2014	Haleakala	Pan-STARRS 1	·	870 m	MPC · JPL
863343	2014 SH_{435}	—	September 17, 2014	Haleakala	Pan-STARRS 1	·	1.3 km	MPC · JPL
863344	2014 SL_{435}	—	September 23, 2014	Mount Lemmon	Mount Lemmon Survey	·	970 m	MPC · JPL
863345	2014 TD	—	September 19, 2014	Haleakala	Pan-STARRS 1	H	410 m	MPC · JPL
863346	2014 TD_{1}	—	September 20, 2014	Haleakala	Pan-STARRS 1	NYS	910 m	MPC · JPL
863347	2014 TN_{1}	—	August 27, 2014	Haleakala	Pan-STARRS 1	EOS	1.3 km	MPC · JPL
863348	2014 TM_{2}	—	September 19, 2014	Haleakala	Pan-STARRS 1	H	390 m	MPC · JPL
863349	2014 TJ_{3}	—	October 30, 2007	Mount Lemmon	Mount Lemmon Survey	·	670 m	MPC · JPL
863350	2014 TS_{3}	—	September 18, 2003	Kitt Peak	Spacewatch	NYS	650 m	MPC · JPL
863351	2014 TZ_{3}	—	September 23, 2014	Mount Lemmon	Mount Lemmon Survey	MAS	540 m	MPC · JPL
863352	2014 TS_{5}	—	September 2, 2010	Mount Lemmon	Mount Lemmon Survey	·	900 m	MPC · JPL
863353	2014 TC_{10}	—	August 25, 2014	Haleakala	Pan-STARRS 1	·	1.6 km	MPC · JPL
863354	2014 TA_{12}	—	September 20, 2014	Catalina	CSS	·	1.7 km	MPC · JPL
863355	2014 TB_{12}	—	September 25, 2014	Catalina	CSS	·	1.2 km	MPC · JPL
863356	2014 TK_{12}	—	October 13, 2007	Catalina	CSS	·	590 m	MPC · JPL
863357	2014 TC_{13}	—	October 1, 2014	Haleakala	Pan-STARRS 1	·	980 m	MPC · JPL
863358	2014 TQ_{15}	—	October 1, 2014	Haleakala	Pan-STARRS 1	·	2.0 km	MPC · JPL
863359	2014 TD_{16}	—	September 3, 2014	Mount Lemmon	Mount Lemmon Survey	·	910 m	MPC · JPL
863360	2014 TF_{21}	—	October 1, 2014	Kitt Peak	Spacewatch	TIR	2.1 km	MPC · JPL
863361	2014 TL_{21}	—	April 16, 2013	Cerro Tololo-DECam	DECam	·	880 m	MPC · JPL
863362	2014 TY_{25}	—	August 25, 2014	Haleakala	Pan-STARRS 1	·	2.1 km	MPC · JPL
863363	2014 TW_{27}	—	November 30, 2003	Kitt Peak	Spacewatch	MAS	480 m	MPC · JPL
863364	2014 TH_{28}	—	August 23, 2001	Anderson Mesa	LONEOS	·	1.0 km	MPC · JPL
863365	2014 TB_{30}	—	October 2, 2014	Haleakala	Pan-STARRS 1	·	1.4 km	MPC · JPL
863366	2014 TW_{31}	—	December 1, 2003	Kitt Peak	Spacewatch	·	2.2 km	MPC · JPL
863367	2014 TA_{33}	—	October 7, 2014	Haleakala	Pan-STARRS 1	H	420 m	MPC · JPL
863368	2014 TM_{33}	—	October 4, 2014	Mount Lemmon	Mount Lemmon Survey	H	500 m	MPC · JPL
863369	2014 TQ_{33}	—	October 2, 2014	Haleakala	Pan-STARRS 1	H	370 m	MPC · JPL
863370	2014 TS_{35}	—	October 3, 2014	Kitt Peak	Spacewatch	H	360 m	MPC · JPL
863371	2014 TV_{39}	—	August 29, 2014	Mount Lemmon	Mount Lemmon Survey	·	900 m	MPC · JPL
863372	2014 TB_{41}	—	September 19, 2014	Haleakala	Pan-STARRS 1	·	1.9 km	MPC · JPL
863373	2014 TG_{45}	—	September 21, 1995	Kitt Peak	Spacewatch	MAS	470 m	MPC · JPL
863374	2014 TJ_{46}	—	September 5, 2010	Mount Lemmon	Mount Lemmon Survey	·	760 m	MPC · JPL
863375	2014 TS_{46}	—	September 26, 2008	Kitt Peak	Spacewatch	·	2.4 km	MPC · JPL
863376	2014 TK_{48}	—	April 1, 2013	Mount Lemmon	Mount Lemmon Survey	PHO	660 m	MPC · JPL
863377	2014 TQ_{48}	—	October 5, 2004	Kitt Peak	Spacewatch	·	480 m	MPC · JPL
863378	2014 TJ_{51}	—	October 14, 2014	Mount Lemmon	Mount Lemmon Survey	VER	1.7 km	MPC · JPL
863379	2014 TT_{51}	—	February 25, 2011	Mount Lemmon	Mount Lemmon Survey	·	2.0 km	MPC · JPL
863380	2014 TG_{52}	—	August 31, 2014	Haleakala	Pan-STARRS 1	NYS	780 m	MPC · JPL
863381	2014 TX_{54}	—	October 14, 2014	Mount Lemmon	Mount Lemmon Survey	·	1.7 km	MPC · JPL
863382	2014 TJ_{59}	—	July 4, 2005	Kitt Peak	Spacewatch	·	1.0 km	MPC · JPL
863383	2014 TV_{59}	—	November 16, 2003	Kitt Peak	Spacewatch	NYS	740 m	MPC · JPL
863384	2014 TO_{63}	—	October 29, 2005	Catalina	CSS	·	1.4 km	MPC · JPL
863385	2014 TP_{63}	—	September 9, 2014	Haleakala	Pan-STARRS 1	LIX	2.8 km	MPC · JPL
863386	2014 TP_{65}	—	August 27, 2014	Haleakala	Pan-STARRS 1	·	560 m	MPC · JPL
863387	2014 TR_{68}	—	October 2, 1999	Kitt Peak	Spacewatch	·	930 m	MPC · JPL
863388	2014 TV_{68}	—	October 1, 2014	Catalina	CSS	·	510 m	MPC · JPL
863389	2014 TP_{69}	—	August 31, 2014	Haleakala	Pan-STARRS 1	·	1.6 km	MPC · JPL
863390	2014 TD_{71}	—	October 14, 2014	Kitt Peak	Spacewatch	(5)	910 m	MPC · JPL
863391	2014 TM_{74}	—	October 15, 2014	Kitt Peak	Spacewatch	·	2.3 km	MPC · JPL
863392	2014 TG_{75}	—	September 17, 2010	Catalina	CSS	PHO	610 m	MPC · JPL
863393	2014 TC_{77}	—	September 19, 2014	Haleakala	Pan-STARRS 1	·	2.1 km	MPC · JPL
863394	2014 TF_{78}	—	September 14, 2014	Kitt Peak	Spacewatch	HYG	2.0 km	MPC · JPL
863395	2014 TW_{79}	—	October 21, 2003	Kitt Peak	Spacewatch	·	1.7 km	MPC · JPL
863396	2014 TT_{81}	—	September 19, 2014	Haleakala	Pan-STARRS 1	·	1.5 km	MPC · JPL
863397	2014 TJ_{86}	—	May 6, 2005	Kitt Peak	D. E. Trilling, A. S. Rivkin	H	510 m	MPC · JPL
863398	2014 TL_{86}	—	August 31, 2014	Haleakala	Pan-STARRS 1	L5	7.5 km	MPC · JPL
863399	2014 TN_{87}	—	October 14, 2014	Kitt Peak	Spacewatch	EOS	1.2 km	MPC · JPL
863400	2014 TZ_{88}	—	September 7, 2008	Mount Lemmon	Mount Lemmon Survey	·	2.1 km	MPC · JPL

== 863401–863500 ==
back to top

Designation			Discovery			Properties		Ref
Permanent	Provisional	Named after	Date	Site	Discoverer(s)	Category	Diam.	Ref
863401	2014 TC_{89}	—	October 3, 2014	Mount Lemmon	Mount Lemmon Survey	TIR	2.0 km	MPC · JPL
863402	2014 TK_{89}	—	October 23, 2009	Mount Lemmon	Mount Lemmon Survey	·	1.5 km	MPC · JPL
863403	2014 TF_{91}	—	October 23, 2009	Kitt Peak	Spacewatch	·	2.0 km	MPC · JPL
863404	2014 TT_{92}	—	October 2, 2014	Haleakala	Pan-STARRS 1	·	2.4 km	MPC · JPL
863405	2014 TR_{93}	—	February 26, 2011	Mount Lemmon	Mount Lemmon Survey	·	1.4 km	MPC · JPL
863406	2014 TV_{93}	—	October 3, 2014	Kitt Peak	Spacewatch	·	2.3 km	MPC · JPL
863407	2014 TE_{94}	—	October 4, 2014	Mount Lemmon	Mount Lemmon Survey	·	1.9 km	MPC · JPL
863408	2014 TT_{95}	—	October 3, 2014	Mount Lemmon	Mount Lemmon Survey	MAS	480 m	MPC · JPL
863409	2014 TA_{96}	—	January 9, 2007	Kitt Peak	Spacewatch	·	1.1 km	MPC · JPL
863410	2014 TG_{96}	—	October 12, 2014	Mount Lemmon	Mount Lemmon Survey	TIR	2.8 km	MPC · JPL
863411	2014 TK_{96}	—	October 1, 2014	Haleakala	Pan-STARRS 1	H	350 m	MPC · JPL
863412	2014 TL_{96}	—	October 1, 2014	Haleakala	Pan-STARRS 1	·	1.9 km	MPC · JPL
863413	2014 TN_{96}	—	October 13, 2014	Mount Lemmon	Mount Lemmon Survey	·	860 m	MPC · JPL
863414	2014 TR_{96}	—	October 15, 2014	Nogales	M. Schwartz, P. R. Holvorcem	H	490 m	MPC · JPL
863415	2014 TV_{96}	—	October 3, 2014	Mount Lemmon	Mount Lemmon Survey	·	2.2 km	MPC · JPL
863416	2014 TW_{96}	—	October 1, 2014	Haleakala	Pan-STARRS 1	THB	1.6 km	MPC · JPL
863417	2014 TV_{98}	—	October 1, 2014	Haleakala	Pan-STARRS 1	EOS	1.4 km	MPC · JPL
863418	2014 TS_{99}	—	March 21, 2017	Haleakala	Pan-STARRS 1	·	2.2 km	MPC · JPL
863419	2014 TR_{101}	—	October 12, 2014	Mount Lemmon	Mount Lemmon Survey	·	690 m	MPC · JPL
863420	2014 TB_{102}	—	October 1, 2014	Haleakala	Pan-STARRS 1	·	2.2 km	MPC · JPL
863421	2014 TC_{103}	—	September 24, 2014	Kitt Peak	Spacewatch	·	750 m	MPC · JPL
863422	2014 TH_{103}	—	October 1, 2014	Haleakala	Pan-STARRS 1	·	2.0 km	MPC · JPL
863423	2014 TZ_{103}	—	October 13, 2014	Mount Lemmon	Mount Lemmon Survey	·	2.3 km	MPC · JPL
863424	2014 TC_{104}	—	October 5, 2014	Haleakala	Pan-STARRS 1	·	2.1 km	MPC · JPL
863425	2014 TT_{104}	—	October 3, 2014	Mount Lemmon	Mount Lemmon Survey	·	890 m	MPC · JPL
863426	2014 TB_{105}	—	October 14, 2014	Mount Lemmon	Mount Lemmon Survey	·	1.2 km	MPC · JPL
863427	2014 TD_{105}	—	October 1, 2014	Haleakala	Pan-STARRS 1	·	860 m	MPC · JPL
863428	2014 TT_{105}	—	May 18, 2009	Mount Lemmon	Mount Lemmon Survey	·	920 m	MPC · JPL
863429	2014 TW_{106}	—	October 2, 2014	Mount Lemmon	Mount Lemmon Survey	THM	1.9 km	MPC · JPL
863430	2014 TO_{107}	—	October 1, 2014	Kitt Peak	Spacewatch	·	2.2 km	MPC · JPL
863431	2014 TU_{108}	—	October 13, 2014	Haleakala	Pan-STARRS 1	T_{j} (2.97) · EUP	3.1 km	MPC · JPL
863432	2014 TX_{108}	—	October 4, 2014	Mount Lemmon	Mount Lemmon Survey	·	2.4 km	MPC · JPL
863433	2014 TZ_{108}	—	October 2, 2014	Haleakala	Pan-STARRS 1	·	2.0 km	MPC · JPL
863434	2014 TC_{109}	—	October 15, 2014	Mount Lemmon	Mount Lemmon Survey	·	2.1 km	MPC · JPL
863435	2014 TH_{109}	—	October 14, 2014	Mount Lemmon	Mount Lemmon Survey	·	470 m	MPC · JPL
863436	2014 TK_{109}	—	October 2, 2014	Haleakala	Pan-STARRS 1	·	2.0 km	MPC · JPL
863437	2014 TQ_{109}	—	September 30, 2003	Kitt Peak	Spacewatch	·	700 m	MPC · JPL
863438	2014 TZ_{110}	—	October 1, 2014	Haleakala	Pan-STARRS 1	VER	2.0 km	MPC · JPL
863439	2014 TB_{111}	—	October 4, 2014	Mount Lemmon	Mount Lemmon Survey	·	1.9 km	MPC · JPL
863440	2014 TD_{111}	—	October 2, 2014	Haleakala	Pan-STARRS 1	·	1.8 km	MPC · JPL
863441	2014 TL_{111}	—	October 15, 2014	Kitt Peak	Spacewatch	·	2.3 km	MPC · JPL
863442	2014 TM_{111}	—	October 5, 2014	Mount Lemmon	Mount Lemmon Survey	·	2.5 km	MPC · JPL
863443	2014 TN_{111}	—	September 3, 2008	Kitt Peak	Spacewatch	·	2.0 km	MPC · JPL
863444	2014 TS_{111}	—	October 1, 2014	Haleakala	Pan-STARRS 1	·	2.3 km	MPC · JPL
863445	2014 TR_{112}	—	October 2, 2014	Haleakala	Pan-STARRS 1	·	2.0 km	MPC · JPL
863446	2014 TT_{112}	—	October 1, 2014	Kitt Peak	Spacewatch	·	2.2 km	MPC · JPL
863447	2014 TB_{113}	—	October 5, 2014	Mount Lemmon	Mount Lemmon Survey	·	680 m	MPC · JPL
863448	2014 TH_{113}	—	October 3, 2014	Kitt Peak	Spacewatch	·	1.1 km	MPC · JPL
863449	2014 TK_{113}	—	October 2, 2014	Haleakala	Pan-STARRS 1	·	840 m	MPC · JPL
863450	2014 TW_{113}	—	October 3, 2014	Haleakala	Pan-STARRS 1	·	780 m	MPC · JPL
863451	2014 TS_{114}	—	October 1, 2014	Haleakala	Pan-STARRS 1	·	780 m	MPC · JPL
863452	2014 TZ_{117}	—	October 1, 2014	Haleakala	Pan-STARRS 1	·	2.0 km	MPC · JPL
863453	2014 TP_{118}	—	October 2, 2014	Mount Lemmon	Mount Lemmon Survey	·	880 m	MPC · JPL
863454	2014 TL_{119}	—	October 14, 2014	Mount Lemmon	Mount Lemmon Survey	·	440 m	MPC · JPL
863455	2014 TK_{123}	—	October 1, 2014	Mount Lemmon	Mount Lemmon Survey	·	1.2 km	MPC · JPL
863456	2014 TT_{127}	—	October 3, 2014	Mount Lemmon	Mount Lemmon Survey	L5	6.4 km	MPC · JPL
863457	2014 TG_{129}	—	October 14, 2014	Mount Lemmon	Mount Lemmon Survey	·	1.9 km	MPC · JPL
863458	2014 TL_{129}	—	October 5, 2014	Mount Lemmon	Mount Lemmon Survey	·	1.9 km	MPC · JPL
863459	2014 UT_{1}	—	September 20, 2014	Haleakala	Pan-STARRS 1	·	940 m	MPC · JPL
863460	2014 UU_{3}	—	September 28, 2003	Anderson Mesa	LONEOS	·	2.2 km	MPC · JPL
863461	2014 UZ_{4}	—	October 21, 2003	Socorro	LINEAR	·	870 m	MPC · JPL
863462	2014 UT_{5}	—	August 27, 2005	Palomar	NEAT	·	1.3 km	MPC · JPL
863463	2014 UA_{6}	—	October 1, 2014	Haleakala	Pan-STARRS 1	·	2.4 km	MPC · JPL
863464	2014 UE_{6}	—	August 18, 2010	ESA OGS	ESA OGS	·	750 m	MPC · JPL
863465	2014 UP_{6}	—	September 4, 2014	Haleakala	Pan-STARRS 1	·	1.9 km	MPC · JPL
863466	2014 UY_{6}	—	August 28, 2005	Kitt Peak	Spacewatch	·	1.1 km	MPC · JPL
863467	2014 UC_{7}	—	October 11, 2010	Mount Lemmon	Mount Lemmon Survey	·	770 m	MPC · JPL
863468	2014 UO_{8}	—	October 16, 2014	Kitt Peak	Spacewatch	·	2.3 km	MPC · JPL
863469	2014 UA_{11}	—	October 17, 2014	Kitt Peak	Spacewatch	·	2.1 km	MPC · JPL
863470	2014 UN_{13}	—	November 9, 2007	Kitt Peak	Spacewatch	ERI	1.1 km	MPC · JPL
863471	2014 UT_{13}	—	September 15, 2010	Kitt Peak	Spacewatch	·	810 m	MPC · JPL
863472	2014 UT_{14}	—	October 27, 2003	Kitt Peak	Spacewatch	ERI	1.0 km	MPC · JPL
863473	2014 UP_{17}	—	October 18, 2014	Teide	Serra-Ricart, M., Bosch, J. M.	·	2.3 km	MPC · JPL
863474	2014 UD_{18}	—	October 18, 2014	Kitt Peak	Spacewatch	·	2.2 km	MPC · JPL
863475	2014 UJ_{18}	—	October 18, 2014	Kitt Peak	Spacewatch	·	750 m	MPC · JPL
863476	2014 UV_{18}	—	November 17, 1999	Kitt Peak	Spacewatch	NYS	700 m	MPC · JPL
863477	2014 UB_{19}	—	August 31, 2014	Haleakala	Pan-STARRS 1	MAS	580 m	MPC · JPL
863478	2014 UU_{23}	—	November 5, 2005	Catalina	CSS	·	1.2 km	MPC · JPL
863479	2014 UK_{24}	—	October 19, 2014	Kitt Peak	Spacewatch	LUT	2.9 km	MPC · JPL
863480	2014 UN_{25}	—	July 29, 2008	Kitt Peak	Spacewatch	·	2.7 km	MPC · JPL
863481	2014 UC_{26}	—	October 5, 2014	Mount Lemmon	Mount Lemmon Survey	·	2.1 km	MPC · JPL
863482	2014 UP_{30}	—	September 22, 2014	Haleakala	Pan-STARRS 1	V	630 m	MPC · JPL
863483	2014 UT_{30}	—	September 24, 2005	Kitt Peak	Spacewatch	·	1.2 km	MPC · JPL
863484	2014 UD_{31}	—	October 21, 2014	Mount Lemmon	Mount Lemmon Survey	·	2.1 km	MPC · JPL
863485	2014 UL_{31}	—	November 18, 2003	Kitt Peak	Spacewatch	THM	1.6 km	MPC · JPL
863486	2014 UO_{31}	—	September 17, 2010	Mount Lemmon	Mount Lemmon Survey	·	780 m	MPC · JPL
863487	2014 UW_{31}	—	September 6, 2008	Mount Lemmon	Mount Lemmon Survey	·	2.1 km	MPC · JPL
863488	2014 UD_{34}	—	December 19, 2009	Mount Lemmon	Mount Lemmon Survey	H	420 m	MPC · JPL
863489	2014 UK_{34}	—	October 23, 2014	Mount Lemmon	Mount Lemmon Survey	H	530 m	MPC · JPL
863490	2014 UN_{34}	—	October 23, 2014	Mount Lemmon	Mount Lemmon Survey	·	1.1 km	MPC · JPL
863491	2014 UJ_{35}	—	September 7, 2008	Mount Lemmon	Mount Lemmon Survey	·	2.0 km	MPC · JPL
863492	2014 UE_{36}	—	October 18, 2014	Mount Lemmon	Mount Lemmon Survey	·	2.0 km	MPC · JPL
863493	2014 UM_{36}	—	October 18, 2014	Mount Lemmon	Mount Lemmon Survey	·	2.1 km	MPC · JPL
863494	2014 UJ_{38}	—	October 18, 2014	Mount Lemmon	Mount Lemmon Survey	·	790 m	MPC · JPL
863495	2014 UU_{38}	—	October 18, 2014	Mount Lemmon	Mount Lemmon Survey	THM	1.7 km	MPC · JPL
863496	2014 UW_{38}	—	October 4, 2014	Kitt Peak	Spacewatch	·	2.5 km	MPC · JPL
863497	2014 UZ_{41}	—	October 3, 2014	Mount Lemmon	Mount Lemmon Survey	ERI	1.3 km	MPC · JPL
863498	2014 UZ_{43}	—	October 21, 2014	Kitt Peak	Spacewatch	·	710 m	MPC · JPL
863499	2014 UX_{44}	—	August 31, 2014	Haleakala	Pan-STARRS 1	·	2.0 km	MPC · JPL
863500	2014 UG_{45}	—	October 21, 2014	Kitt Peak	Spacewatch	·	1.4 km	MPC · JPL

== 863501–863600 ==
back to top

Designation			Discovery			Properties		Ref
Permanent	Provisional	Named after	Date	Site	Discoverer(s)	Category	Diam.	Ref
863501	2014 UK_{45}	—	August 31, 2014	Haleakala	Pan-STARRS 1	LIX	2.4 km	MPC · JPL
863502	2014 UZ_{45}	—	September 18, 2003	Kitt Peak	Spacewatch	NYS	750 m	MPC · JPL
863503	2014 UB_{46}	—	October 21, 2014	Kitt Peak	Spacewatch	·	1.3 km	MPC · JPL
863504	2014 US_{46}	—	October 28, 2008	Mount Lemmon	Mount Lemmon Survey	THM	1.5 km	MPC · JPL
863505	2014 UZ_{47}	—	August 31, 2014	Haleakala	Pan-STARRS 1	·	2.2 km	MPC · JPL
863506	2014 UT_{48}	—	September 24, 2014	Kitt Peak	Spacewatch	·	1.2 km	MPC · JPL
863507	2014 UH_{49}	—	August 10, 2010	Kitt Peak	Spacewatch	·	750 m	MPC · JPL
863508	2014 UF_{51}	—	October 21, 2014	Mount Lemmon	Mount Lemmon Survey	THB	2.3 km	MPC · JPL
863509	2014 UM_{51}	—	October 22, 2014	WISE	WISE	T_{j} (2.94)	1.9 km	MPC · JPL
863510	2014 UA_{52}	—	September 18, 2010	Mount Lemmon	Mount Lemmon Survey	·	1.1 km	MPC · JPL
863511	2014 UN_{52}	—	September 14, 2006	Catalina	CSS	T_{j} (2.98) · 3:2	3.9 km	MPC · JPL
863512	2014 UA_{53}	—	October 22, 2014	Kitt Peak	Spacewatch	·	2.1 km	MPC · JPL
863513	2014 UR_{54}	—	October 5, 2014	Mount Lemmon	Mount Lemmon Survey	H	400 m	MPC · JPL
863514	2014 UM_{56}	—	October 25, 2014	Mount Lemmon	Mount Lemmon Survey	H	370 m	MPC · JPL
863515	2014 UO_{56}	—	October 23, 2014	Nogales	M. Schwartz, P. R. Holvorcem	·	1.2 km	MPC · JPL
863516	2014 UC_{59}	—	October 16, 2009	Mount Lemmon	Mount Lemmon Survey	KOR	1 km	MPC · JPL
863517	2014 UU_{59}	—	October 23, 2003	Sacramento Peak	SDSS	·	730 m	MPC · JPL
863518	2014 UA_{61}	—	October 2, 2014	Haleakala	Pan-STARRS 1	·	940 m	MPC · JPL
863519	2014 UC_{61}	—	March 16, 2012	Mount Lemmon	Mount Lemmon Survey	LUT	3.2 km	MPC · JPL
863520	2014 UK_{63}	—	June 5, 2013	Mount Lemmon	Mount Lemmon Survey	·	1.7 km	MPC · JPL
863521	2014 UK_{67}	—	September 16, 2014	Haleakala	Pan-STARRS 1	·	2.2 km	MPC · JPL
863522	2014 UM_{67}	—	November 17, 2009	Kitt Peak	Spacewatch	·	1.8 km	MPC · JPL
863523	2014 UE_{69}	—	September 17, 2003	Kitt Peak	Spacewatch	·	700 m	MPC · JPL
863524	2014 UO_{72}	—	September 23, 2014	Mount Lemmon	Mount Lemmon Survey	THM	1.7 km	MPC · JPL
863525	2014 UG_{76}	—	October 21, 2014	Mount Lemmon	Mount Lemmon Survey	MAS	540 m	MPC · JPL
863526	2014 UN_{76}	—	April 11, 2010	Kitt Peak	Spacewatch	·	440 m	MPC · JPL
863527	2014 UC_{78}	—	June 21, 2010	Mount Lemmon	Mount Lemmon Survey	NYS	800 m	MPC · JPL
863528	2014 UK_{78}	—	December 31, 2007	Mount Lemmon	Mount Lemmon Survey	MAS	520 m	MPC · JPL
863529	2014 UQ_{78}	—	October 5, 2014	Kitt Peak	Spacewatch	·	2.4 km	MPC · JPL
863530	2014 UX_{78}	—	October 21, 2014	Mount Lemmon	Mount Lemmon Survey	·	2.1 km	MPC · JPL
863531	2014 UX_{80}	—	October 9, 2004	Kitt Peak	Spacewatch	·	410 m	MPC · JPL
863532	2014 UD_{82}	—	September 12, 2001	Kitt Peak	Spacewatch	·	1.0 km	MPC · JPL
863533	2014 UB_{83}	—	September 21, 2003	Palomar	NEAT	·	1.6 km	MPC · JPL
863534	2014 UO_{83}	—	October 21, 2014	Mount Lemmon	Mount Lemmon Survey	T_{j} (2.99)	2.1 km	MPC · JPL
863535	2014 UX_{84}	—	October 21, 2014	Mount Lemmon	Mount Lemmon Survey	·	900 m	MPC · JPL
863536	2014 UG_{85}	—	October 21, 2014	Mount Lemmon	Mount Lemmon Survey	·	2.1 km	MPC · JPL
863537	2014 UL_{87}	—	October 22, 2014	Kitt Peak	Spacewatch	THM	1.4 km	MPC · JPL
863538	2014 UG_{90}	—	September 30, 2010	Mount Lemmon	Mount Lemmon Survey	·	1.0 km	MPC · JPL
863539	2014 UX_{90}	—	October 22, 2014	Mount Lemmon	Mount Lemmon Survey	·	2.0 km	MPC · JPL
863540	2014 US_{91}	—	October 14, 2014	Kitt Peak	Spacewatch	NYS	900 m	MPC · JPL
863541	2014 UA_{95}	—	August 31, 2014	Haleakala	Pan-STARRS 1	·	910 m	MPC · JPL
863542	2014 UJ_{95}	—	October 1, 2003	Kitt Peak	Spacewatch	·	1.6 km	MPC · JPL
863543	2014 UZ_{95}	—	October 15, 2014	Kitt Peak	Spacewatch	·	1.6 km	MPC · JPL
863544	2014 US_{98}	—	December 25, 2010	Mount Lemmon	Mount Lemmon Survey	·	1.3 km	MPC · JPL
863545	2014 UO_{100}	—	October 24, 2014	Kitt Peak	Spacewatch	·	1.2 km	MPC · JPL
863546	2014 US_{101}	—	October 16, 2003	Kitt Peak	Spacewatch	THM	1.7 km	MPC · JPL
863547	2014 UQ_{103}	—	August 31, 2014	Haleakala	Pan-STARRS 1	·	2.2 km	MPC · JPL
863548	2014 UC_{105}	—	September 13, 2007	Mount Lemmon	Mount Lemmon Survey	(2076)	660 m	MPC · JPL
863549	2014 UD_{105}	—	September 29, 2014	Haleakala	Pan-STARRS 1	·	1.9 km	MPC · JPL
863550	2014 UZ_{105}	—	October 24, 2014	Kitt Peak	Spacewatch	URS	2.5 km	MPC · JPL
863551	2014 UQ_{107}	—	August 25, 2014	Haleakala	Pan-STARRS 1	·	560 m	MPC · JPL
863552	2014 UL_{108}	—	October 16, 2014	Kitt Peak	Spacewatch	NYS	870 m	MPC · JPL
863553	2014 UA_{109}	—	October 31, 1999	Kitt Peak	Spacewatch	MAS	500 m	MPC · JPL
863554	2014 UF_{109}	—	October 3, 2014	Mount Lemmon	Mount Lemmon Survey	·	2.3 km	MPC · JPL
863555	2014 UQ_{109}	—	September 16, 2009	Kitt Peak	Spacewatch	EOS	1.3 km	MPC · JPL
863556	2014 UU_{110}	—	September 20, 2014	Haleakala	Pan-STARRS 1	·	890 m	MPC · JPL
863557	2014 UX_{110}	—	September 18, 2014	Haleakala	Pan-STARRS 1	EMA	2.3 km	MPC · JPL
863558	2014 UT_{112}	—	October 3, 2014	Kitt Peak	Spacewatch	·	2.1 km	MPC · JPL
863559	2014 UM_{113}	—	October 25, 2014	Haleakala	Pan-STARRS 1	·	1.8 km	MPC · JPL
863560	2014 UF_{114}	—	August 31, 2014	Haleakala	Pan-STARRS 1	·	870 m	MPC · JPL
863561	2014 UO_{114}	—	October 26, 2014	Mount Lemmon	Mount Lemmon Survey	H	350 m	MPC · JPL
863562	2014 UD_{116}	—	October 28, 2014	Catalina	CSS	H	570 m	MPC · JPL
863563	2014 UG_{118}	—	October 28, 2010	Mount Lemmon	Mount Lemmon Survey	·	1.1 km	MPC · JPL
863564	2014 UK_{119}	—	August 23, 2003	Palomar	NEAT	·	660 m	MPC · JPL
863565	2014 UM_{119}	—	October 22, 2014	Kitt Peak	Spacewatch	PHO	720 m	MPC · JPL
863566	2014 UA_{120}	—	August 29, 2014	Mount Lemmon	Mount Lemmon Survey	·	1 km	MPC · JPL
863567	2014 UP_{121}	—	September 21, 2003	Palomar	NEAT	·	2.2 km	MPC · JPL
863568	2014 UA_{122}	—	October 4, 2014	Catalina	CSS	·	950 m	MPC · JPL
863569	2014 UK_{122}	—	October 3, 2014	Mount Lemmon	Mount Lemmon Survey	·	2.9 km	MPC · JPL
863570	2014 UX_{122}	—	October 22, 2014	Mount Lemmon	Mount Lemmon Survey	(1547)	1.4 km	MPC · JPL
863571	2014 UA_{124}	—	January 23, 2011	Mount Lemmon	Mount Lemmon Survey	·	1.0 km	MPC · JPL
863572	2014 UL_{127}	—	October 23, 2014	Kitt Peak	Spacewatch	·	650 m	MPC · JPL
863573	2014 UD_{128}	—	October 23, 2014	Kitt Peak	Spacewatch	·	2.4 km	MPC · JPL
863574	2014 UZ_{128}	—	September 12, 2007	Mount Lemmon	Mount Lemmon Survey	·	470 m	MPC · JPL
863575	2014 UO_{129}	—	October 23, 2014	Mount Lemmon	Mount Lemmon Survey	·	470 m	MPC · JPL
863576	2014 UP_{129}	—	April 15, 2012	Haleakala	Pan-STARRS 1	·	2.5 km	MPC · JPL
863577	2014 UY_{129}	—	October 11, 2010	Mount Lemmon	Mount Lemmon Survey	·	1.2 km	MPC · JPL
863578	2014 US_{130}	—	October 23, 2014	Mount Lemmon	Mount Lemmon Survey	L5	6.6 km	MPC · JPL
863579	2014 UK_{132}	—	October 28, 2010	Mount Lemmon	Mount Lemmon Survey	NYS	950 m	MPC · JPL
863580	2014 UX_{132}	—	September 2, 2014	Haleakala	Pan-STARRS 1	·	670 m	MPC · JPL
863581	2014 UT_{133}	—	October 24, 2014	Kitt Peak	Spacewatch	·	810 m	MPC · JPL
863582	2014 UZ_{133}	—	October 12, 2007	Mount Lemmon	Mount Lemmon Survey	·	610 m	MPC · JPL
863583	2014 UQ_{134}	—	December 21, 2003	Kitt Peak	Spacewatch	·	2.2 km	MPC · JPL
863584	2014 UN_{136}	—	October 24, 2014	Kitt Peak	Spacewatch	·	810 m	MPC · JPL
863585	2014 UC_{137}	—	October 18, 2001	Kitt Peak	Spacewatch	·	890 m	MPC · JPL
863586	2014 UM_{137}	—	October 24, 2014	Kitt Peak	Spacewatch	·	670 m	MPC · JPL
863587	2014 UZ_{137}	—	September 25, 2014	Mount Lemmon	Mount Lemmon Survey	THB	2.3 km	MPC · JPL
863588	2014 UD_{138}	—	October 25, 2014	Kitt Peak	Spacewatch	·	980 m	MPC · JPL
863589	2014 UV_{138}	—	October 17, 2014	Kitt Peak	Spacewatch	·	2.1 km	MPC · JPL
863590	2014 UW_{138}	—	January 16, 2004	Kitt Peak	Spacewatch	·	630 m	MPC · JPL
863591	2014 UQ_{139}	—	December 3, 2010	Mount Lemmon	Mount Lemmon Survey	·	900 m	MPC · JPL
863592	2014 UK_{140}	—	September 25, 2014	Mount Lemmon	Mount Lemmon Survey	·	1.8 km	MPC · JPL
863593	2014 UK_{141}	—	September 15, 2014	Mount Lemmon	Mount Lemmon Survey	·	2.1 km	MPC · JPL
863594	2014 US_{141}	—	September 15, 2014	Mount Lemmon	Mount Lemmon Survey	V	430 m	MPC · JPL
863595	2014 UG_{144}	—	September 9, 2008	Mount Lemmon	Mount Lemmon Survey	·	1.5 km	MPC · JPL
863596	2014 UO_{145}	—	September 26, 2014	Kitt Peak	Spacewatch	V	480 m	MPC · JPL
863597	2014 UV_{145}	—	December 3, 2010	Mount Lemmon	Mount Lemmon Survey	·	920 m	MPC · JPL
863598	2014 UG_{146}	—	October 25, 2014	Mount Lemmon	Mount Lemmon Survey	·	820 m	MPC · JPL
863599	2014 UQ_{147}	—	October 2, 2014	Haleakala	Pan-STARRS 1	·	1.9 km	MPC · JPL
863600	2014 UC_{148}	—	October 25, 2014	Kitt Peak	Spacewatch	H	400 m	MPC · JPL

== 863601–863700 ==
back to top

Designation			Discovery			Properties		Ref
Permanent	Provisional	Named after	Date	Site	Discoverer(s)	Category	Diam.	Ref
863601	2014 UL_{151}	—	April 20, 2007	Kitt Peak	Spacewatch	·	2.3 km	MPC · JPL
863602	2014 UL_{152}	—	October 5, 2003	Kitt Peak	Spacewatch	·	880 m	MPC · JPL
863603	2014 UD_{153}	—	October 25, 2014	Kitt Peak	Spacewatch	·	790 m	MPC · JPL
863604	2014 UO_{153}	—	August 25, 2014	Haleakala	Pan-STARRS 1	·	1.3 km	MPC · JPL
863605	2014 UP_{155}	—	April 27, 2012	Haleakala	Pan-STARRS 1	·	2.6 km	MPC · JPL
863606	2014 UT_{157}	—	October 20, 2003	Palomar	NEAT	·	780 m	MPC · JPL
863607	2014 UW_{157}	—	October 25, 2014	Haleakala	Pan-STARRS 1	H	350 m	MPC · JPL
863608	2014 UJ_{159}	—	October 25, 2014	Haleakala	Pan-STARRS 1	·	880 m	MPC · JPL
863609	2014 UU_{161}	—	April 10, 2013	Haleakala	Pan-STARRS 1	·	980 m	MPC · JPL
863610	2014 UH_{162}	—	October 25, 2014	Haleakala	Pan-STARRS 1	·	960 m	MPC · JPL
863611	2014 UK_{162}	—	October 25, 2014	Haleakala	Pan-STARRS 1	·	2.2 km	MPC · JPL
863612	2014 UH_{163}	—	October 18, 2014	Mount Lemmon	Mount Lemmon Survey	EUN	810 m	MPC · JPL
863613	2014 UR_{164}	—	October 26, 2014	Mount Lemmon	Mount Lemmon Survey	VER	1.7 km	MPC · JPL
863614	2014 UQ_{167}	—	October 26, 2014	Mount Lemmon	Mount Lemmon Survey	·	460 m	MPC · JPL
863615	2014 UU_{168}	—	October 10, 2008	Mount Lemmon	Mount Lemmon Survey	·	2.5 km	MPC · JPL
863616	2014 UM_{169}	—	October 26, 2014	Haleakala	Pan-STARRS 1	·	2.3 km	MPC · JPL
863617	2014 UL_{170}	—	October 3, 2014	Mount Lemmon	Mount Lemmon Survey	·	1.3 km	MPC · JPL
863618	2014 UQ_{170}	—	September 18, 2014	Haleakala	Pan-STARRS 1	·	460 m	MPC · JPL
863619	2014 UK_{171}	—	September 20, 2014	Haleakala	Pan-STARRS 1	·	2.3 km	MPC · JPL
863620	2014 UZ_{172}	—	January 10, 2008	Mount Lemmon	Mount Lemmon Survey	·	890 m	MPC · JPL
863621	2014 UL_{173}	—	August 31, 2014	Haleakala	Pan-STARRS 1	·	1.2 km	MPC · JPL
863622	2014 UT_{173}	—	October 28, 2014	Mount Lemmon	Mount Lemmon Survey	·	1.9 km	MPC · JPL
863623	2014 UT_{175}	—	June 13, 2005	Mount Lemmon	Mount Lemmon Survey	3:2	4.3 km	MPC · JPL
863624	2014 UO_{177}	—	September 30, 2003	Kitt Peak	Spacewatch	EOS	1.2 km	MPC · JPL
863625	2014 UC_{178}	—	December 10, 2009	Mount Lemmon	Mount Lemmon Survey	·	1.7 km	MPC · JPL
863626	2014 UF_{178}	—	September 2, 2014	Haleakala	Pan-STARRS 1	(3460)	1.7 km	MPC · JPL
863627	2014 UR_{181}	—	March 14, 2012	Mount Lemmon	Mount Lemmon Survey	·	2.9 km	MPC · JPL
863628	2014 UG_{184}	—	August 12, 2010	Kitt Peak	Spacewatch	·	890 m	MPC · JPL
863629	2014 UY_{185}	—	October 3, 2014	Mount Lemmon	Mount Lemmon Survey	·	2.5 km	MPC · JPL
863630	2014 UH_{187}	—	November 22, 2009	Kitt Peak	Spacewatch	·	1.8 km	MPC · JPL
863631	2014 UQ_{188}	—	September 30, 2014	Mount Lemmon	Mount Lemmon Survey	·	2.1 km	MPC · JPL
863632	2014 UB_{189}	—	October 13, 2014	Mount Lemmon	Mount Lemmon Survey	·	2.0 km	MPC · JPL
863633	2014 UD_{190}	—	September 19, 2009	Mount Lemmon	Mount Lemmon Survey	·	1.3 km	MPC · JPL
863634	2014 UN_{190}	—	August 31, 2014	Haleakala	Pan-STARRS 1	EOS	1.3 km	MPC · JPL
863635	2014 UZ_{190}	—	October 17, 2014	Mount Lemmon	Mount Lemmon Survey	·	2.0 km	MPC · JPL
863636	2014 US_{191}	—	October 30, 2014	Haleakala	Pan-STARRS 1	H	410 m	MPC · JPL
863637	2014 UH_{192}	—	October 28, 2014	Haleakala	Pan-STARRS 1	twotino	174 km	MPC · JPL
863638	2014 UB_{193}	—	September 25, 2014	Catalina	CSS	·	1.3 km	MPC · JPL
863639	2014 UF_{193}	—	October 2, 2014	Haleakala	Pan-STARRS 1	·	460 m	MPC · JPL
863640	2014 UM_{193}	—	September 6, 2008	Mount Lemmon	Mount Lemmon Survey	THM	1.8 km	MPC · JPL
863641	2014 UO_{196}	—	October 16, 2014	Kitt Peak	Spacewatch	MAS	530 m	MPC · JPL
863642	2014 UV_{197}	—	October 25, 2014	Haleakala	Pan-STARRS 1	·	510 m	MPC · JPL
863643	2014 UX_{197}	—	October 24, 2014	Kitt Peak	Spacewatch	(895)	2.7 km	MPC · JPL
863644	2014 UD_{198}	—	October 25, 2014	Haleakala	Pan-STARRS 1	H	330 m	MPC · JPL
863645	2014 UT_{199}	—	October 26, 2014	Mount Lemmon	Mount Lemmon Survey	·	1.3 km	MPC · JPL
863646	2014 UU_{201}	—	September 18, 2014	Haleakala	Pan-STARRS 1	·	2.4 km	MPC · JPL
863647	2014 UW_{201}	—	October 18, 2014	Mount Lemmon	Mount Lemmon Survey	·	1.1 km	MPC · JPL
863648	2014 UX_{202}	—	September 23, 2014	Haleakala	Pan-STARRS 1	·	600 m	MPC · JPL
863649	2014 UL_{203}	—	October 18, 2014	Mount Lemmon	Mount Lemmon Survey	·	1.3 km	MPC · JPL
863650	2014 UT_{203}	—	October 3, 2014	Mount Lemmon	Mount Lemmon Survey	·	1.6 km	MPC · JPL
863651	2014 UY_{204}	—	August 22, 2014	Haleakala	Pan-STARRS 1	(1547)	1.3 km	MPC · JPL
863652	2014 UE_{205}	—	November 19, 2003	Kitt Peak	Spacewatch	·	1.7 km	MPC · JPL
863653	2014 UO_{207}	—	October 2, 2014	Haleakala	Pan-STARRS 1	·	380 m	MPC · JPL
863654	2014 US_{207}	—	December 14, 2010	Mount Lemmon	Mount Lemmon Survey	·	1.2 km	MPC · JPL
863655	2014 UP_{208}	—	October 29, 2014	Kitt Peak	Spacewatch	EUP	2.7 km	MPC · JPL
863656	2014 UW_{209}	—	October 30, 2014	Calar Alto	S. Mottola, S. Hellmich	EOS	1.3 km	MPC · JPL
863657	2014 UD_{210}	—	October 31, 2014	Calar Alto	S. Mottola, S. Hellmich	·	920 m	MPC · JPL
863658	2014 UJ_{210}	—	November 7, 2010	Kitt Peak	Spacewatch	·	1.7 km	MPC · JPL
863659	2014 UR_{212}	—	September 18, 2014	Haleakala	Pan-STARRS 1	T_{j} (2.99)	2.9 km	MPC · JPL
863660	2014 UD_{218}	—	September 26, 2014	Catalina	CSS	·	1.1 km	MPC · JPL
863661	2014 UK_{219}	—	October 2, 2014	Catalina	CSS	·	2.1 km	MPC · JPL
863662	2014 UL_{219}	—	October 2, 2014	Catalina	CSS	·	2.8 km	MPC · JPL
863663	2014 UR_{220}	—	October 1, 2014	Haleakala	Pan-STARRS 1	·	830 m	MPC · JPL
863664	2014 UF_{221}	—	October 17, 2014	Mount Lemmon	Mount Lemmon Survey	·	2.3 km	MPC · JPL
863665	2014 UW_{221}	—	October 9, 2007	Kitt Peak	Spacewatch	·	850 m	MPC · JPL
863666	2014 UN_{223}	—	November 16, 2009	Kitt Peak	Spacewatch	·	2.4 km	MPC · JPL
863667	2014 UX_{226}	—	October 9, 2008	Mount Lemmon	Mount Lemmon Survey	·	2.2 km	MPC · JPL
863668	2014 UB_{227}	—	October 28, 2014	Haleakala	Pan-STARRS 1	·	1.2 km	MPC · JPL
863669	2014 UX_{230}	—	October 25, 2008	Mount Lemmon	Mount Lemmon Survey	LUT	3.5 km	MPC · JPL
863670	2014 UC_{231}	—	September 9, 2008	Mount Lemmon	Mount Lemmon Survey	·	2.4 km	MPC · JPL
863671	2014 UE_{231}	—	October 26, 2014	Mount Lemmon	Mount Lemmon Survey	·	1.9 km	MPC · JPL
863672	2014 UY_{232}	—	October 21, 2003	Kitt Peak	Spacewatch	THM	1.6 km	MPC · JPL
863673	2014 UC_{233}	—	October 21, 2003	Kitt Peak	Spacewatch	·	1.8 km	MPC · JPL
863674	2014 UT_{233}	—	October 17, 2014	Kitt Peak	Spacewatch	·	770 m	MPC · JPL
863675	2014 UM_{234}	—	October 17, 2010	Mount Lemmon	Mount Lemmon Survey	·	1.1 km	MPC · JPL
863676	2014 UL_{235}	—	October 25, 2014	Mount Lemmon	Mount Lemmon Survey	·	1.8 km	MPC · JPL
863677	2014 UV_{235}	—	October 15, 2014	Kitt Peak	Spacewatch	THM	1.6 km	MPC · JPL
863678	2014 UW_{235}	—	November 9, 2009	Mount Lemmon	Mount Lemmon Survey	EOS	1.3 km	MPC · JPL
863679	2014 UA_{236}	—	June 4, 2013	Haleakala	Pan-STARRS 1	·	1.0 km	MPC · JPL
863680	2014 UY_{236}	—	October 26, 2014	Mount Lemmon	Mount Lemmon Survey	V	370 m	MPC · JPL
863681	2014 UN_{237}	—	October 28, 2014	Haleakala	Pan-STARRS 1	·	2.0 km	MPC · JPL
863682	2014 UY_{237}	—	October 28, 2014	Haleakala	Pan-STARRS 1	·	1.9 km	MPC · JPL
863683	2014 UO_{238}	—	October 28, 2014	Haleakala	Pan-STARRS 1	PHO	670 m	MPC · JPL
863684	2014 UV_{239}	—	October 29, 2014	Haleakala	Pan-STARRS 1	·	2.0 km	MPC · JPL
863685	2014 UQ_{242}	—	October 29, 2014	Catalina	CSS	H	390 m	MPC · JPL
863686	2014 US_{242}	—	October 21, 2014	Mount Lemmon	Mount Lemmon Survey	AGN	850 m	MPC · JPL
863687	2014 UP_{243}	—	October 16, 2014	Mount Lemmon	Mount Lemmon Survey	H	390 m	MPC · JPL
863688	2014 UW_{243}	—	October 21, 2014	Mount Lemmon	Mount Lemmon Survey	H	360 m	MPC · JPL
863689	2014 UE_{244}	—	October 24, 2014	Mount Lemmon	Mount Lemmon Survey	·	1.8 km	MPC · JPL
863690	2014 UN_{244}	—	October 22, 2014	Catalina	CSS	·	2.2 km	MPC · JPL
863691	2014 UO_{244}	—	September 3, 2008	Kitt Peak	Spacewatch	·	2.2 km	MPC · JPL
863692	2014 UT_{244}	—	October 22, 2014	Catalina	CSS	·	2.3 km	MPC · JPL
863693	2014 UV_{244}	—	October 16, 2014	Mount Lemmon	Mount Lemmon Survey	TIR	1.9 km	MPC · JPL
863694	2014 UA_{246}	—	October 3, 2014	Mount Lemmon	Mount Lemmon Survey	·	1.8 km	MPC · JPL
863695	2014 UQ_{246}	—	October 25, 2014	Kitt Peak	Spacewatch	·	600 m	MPC · JPL
863696	2014 UU_{246}	—	October 28, 2014	Haleakala	Pan-STARRS 1	EOS	1.4 km	MPC · JPL
863697	2014 UY_{246}	—	October 25, 2014	Haleakala	Pan-STARRS 1	V	520 m	MPC · JPL
863698	2014 UJ_{247}	—	October 26, 2014	Mount Lemmon	Mount Lemmon Survey	·	2.1 km	MPC · JPL
863699	2014 UM_{247}	—	October 25, 2014	Haleakala	Pan-STARRS 1	·	2.0 km	MPC · JPL
863700	2014 UA_{248}	—	November 19, 2003	Kitt Peak	Spacewatch	·	1.8 km	MPC · JPL

== 863701–863800 ==
back to top

Designation			Discovery			Properties		Ref
Permanent	Provisional	Named after	Date	Site	Discoverer(s)	Category	Diam.	Ref
863701	2014 UO_{248}	—	March 2, 2017	Mount Lemmon	Mount Lemmon Survey	·	2.5 km	MPC · JPL
863702	2014 US_{250}	—	October 28, 2014	Haleakala	Pan-STARRS 1	·	2.2 km	MPC · JPL
863703	2014 UY_{250}	—	October 20, 2014	Mount Lemmon	Mount Lemmon Survey	L5	7.3 km	MPC · JPL
863704	2014 UF_{251}	—	October 28, 2014	Mount Lemmon	Mount Lemmon Survey	·	1.8 km	MPC · JPL
863705	2014 UN_{251}	—	October 28, 2014	Haleakala	Pan-STARRS 1	·	2.4 km	MPC · JPL
863706	2014 UZ_{251}	—	October 26, 2014	Mount Lemmon	Mount Lemmon Survey	L5	6.2 km	MPC · JPL
863707	2014 UB_{252}	—	October 28, 2014	Haleakala	Pan-STARRS 1	·	1.2 km	MPC · JPL
863708	2014 UD_{252}	—	January 12, 2016	Kitt Peak	Spacewatch	·	2.7 km	MPC · JPL
863709	2014 UW_{252}	—	October 28, 2014	Haleakala	Pan-STARRS 1	·	1.8 km	MPC · JPL
863710	2014 UX_{252}	—	September 29, 2008	Mount Lemmon	Mount Lemmon Survey	THM	1.7 km	MPC · JPL
863711	2014 UU_{253}	—	October 28, 2014	Haleakala	Pan-STARRS 1	·	1.5 km	MPC · JPL
863712	2014 UB_{254}	—	October 28, 2014	Haleakala	Pan-STARRS 1	·	1.9 km	MPC · JPL
863713	2014 UY_{254}	—	October 28, 2014	Haleakala	Pan-STARRS 1	·	1.3 km	MPC · JPL
863714	2014 UB_{255}	—	October 28, 2014	Haleakala	Pan-STARRS 1	VER	1.7 km	MPC · JPL
863715	2014 UJ_{255}	—	October 28, 2014	Mount Lemmon	Mount Lemmon Survey	·	1.9 km	MPC · JPL
863716	2014 UB_{256}	—	October 28, 2014	Haleakala	Pan-STARRS 1	·	1.2 km	MPC · JPL
863717	2014 UR_{256}	—	October 17, 2014	Mount Lemmon	Mount Lemmon Survey	·	2.4 km	MPC · JPL
863718	2014 UW_{256}	—	October 25, 2014	Haleakala	Pan-STARRS 1	·	1.3 km	MPC · JPL
863719	2014 UY_{256}	—	October 28, 2014	Haleakala	Pan-STARRS 1	VER	1.9 km	MPC · JPL
863720	2014 UO_{258}	—	October 21, 2014	Mount Lemmon	Mount Lemmon Survey	·	1.7 km	MPC · JPL
863721	2014 UR_{258}	—	October 22, 2014	Mount Lemmon	Mount Lemmon Survey	·	2.4 km	MPC · JPL
863722	2014 US_{258}	—	October 29, 2014	Kitt Peak	Spacewatch	VER	1.7 km	MPC · JPL
863723	2014 UW_{258}	—	October 24, 2014	Mount Lemmon	Mount Lemmon Survey	KOR	1.0 km	MPC · JPL
863724	2014 UH_{259}	—	October 25, 2014	Kitt Peak	Spacewatch	·	960 m	MPC · JPL
863725	2014 UU_{259}	—	October 28, 2014	Haleakala	Pan-STARRS 1	·	2.2 km	MPC · JPL
863726	2014 UB_{260}	—	October 21, 2014	Mount Lemmon	Mount Lemmon Survey	·	2.0 km	MPC · JPL
863727	2014 UJ_{260}	—	October 30, 2014	Mount Lemmon	Mount Lemmon Survey	LUT	3.0 km	MPC · JPL
863728	2014 UM_{260}	—	February 10, 2011	Mount Lemmon	Mount Lemmon Survey	EOS	1.4 km	MPC · JPL
863729	2014 UP_{260}	—	October 29, 2014	Haleakala	Pan-STARRS 1	·	570 m	MPC · JPL
863730	2014 UQ_{260}	—	October 30, 2014	Mount Lemmon	Mount Lemmon Survey	L5	7.0 km	MPC · JPL
863731	2014 UU_{260}	—	October 28, 2014	Haleakala	Pan-STARRS 1	·	2.7 km	MPC · JPL
863732	2014 UX_{260}	—	October 31, 2014	Kitt Peak	Spacewatch	PHO	610 m	MPC · JPL
863733	2014 UT_{261}	—	October 26, 2014	Mount Lemmon	Mount Lemmon Survey	·	460 m	MPC · JPL
863734	2014 UN_{262}	—	October 28, 2014	Haleakala	Pan-STARRS 1	·	1.8 km	MPC · JPL
863735	2014 UZ_{262}	—	October 25, 2014	Haleakala	Pan-STARRS 1	L5	6.6 km	MPC · JPL
863736	2014 UC_{263}	—	October 29, 2014	Haleakala	Pan-STARRS 1	·	920 m	MPC · JPL
863737	2014 UO_{263}	—	October 18, 2014	Kitt Peak	Spacewatch	MAS	450 m	MPC · JPL
863738	2014 UJ_{264}	—	October 24, 2014	Mount Lemmon	Mount Lemmon Survey	EOS	1.3 km	MPC · JPL
863739	2014 UY_{264}	—	October 28, 2014	Haleakala	Pan-STARRS 1	·	590 m	MPC · JPL
863740	2014 UP_{266}	—	October 30, 2014	Haleakala	Pan-STARRS 1	·	2.2 km	MPC · JPL
863741	2014 UR_{266}	—	October 28, 2014	Haleakala	Pan-STARRS 1	·	2.3 km	MPC · JPL
863742	2014 US_{266}	—	October 17, 2014	Mount Lemmon	Mount Lemmon Survey	·	2.2 km	MPC · JPL
863743	2014 UX_{266}	—	October 17, 2014	Mount Lemmon	Mount Lemmon Survey	·	2.1 km	MPC · JPL
863744	2014 UZ_{266}	—	October 28, 2014	Haleakala	Pan-STARRS 1	·	2.0 km	MPC · JPL
863745	2014 UC_{267}	—	October 17, 2014	Mount Lemmon	Mount Lemmon Survey	·	2.3 km	MPC · JPL
863746	2014 UG_{267}	—	October 28, 2014	Haleakala	Pan-STARRS 1	VER	2.0 km	MPC · JPL
863747	2014 UJ_{267}	—	October 17, 2014	Mount Lemmon	Mount Lemmon Survey	·	1.8 km	MPC · JPL
863748	2014 UM_{267}	—	October 28, 2014	Haleakala	Pan-STARRS 1	·	2.3 km	MPC · JPL
863749	2014 UX_{267}	—	October 28, 2014	Haleakala	Pan-STARRS 1	·	2.1 km	MPC · JPL
863750	2014 UQ_{269}	—	October 24, 2014	Mount Lemmon	Mount Lemmon Survey	·	910 m	MPC · JPL
863751	2014 UR_{269}	—	October 25, 2014	Haleakala	Pan-STARRS 1	ELF	2.4 km	MPC · JPL
863752	2014 UY_{269}	—	October 22, 2014	Kitt Peak	Spacewatch	EMA	2.2 km	MPC · JPL
863753	2014 UE_{271}	—	October 17, 2014	Mount Lemmon	Mount Lemmon Survey	·	2.3 km	MPC · JPL
863754	2014 UO_{271}	—	October 21, 2014	Mount Lemmon	Mount Lemmon Survey	L5	6.9 km	MPC · JPL
863755	2014 UW_{271}	—	October 28, 2014	Haleakala	Pan-STARRS 1	VER	2.2 km	MPC · JPL
863756	2014 UZ_{272}	—	August 20, 2010	XuYi	PMO NEO Survey Program	·	1.1 km	MPC · JPL
863757	2014 UN_{273}	—	October 25, 2014	Mount Lemmon	Mount Lemmon Survey	·	680 m	MPC · JPL
863758	2014 UP_{273}	—	October 28, 2014	Haleakala	Pan-STARRS 1	·	960 m	MPC · JPL
863759	2014 UV_{274}	—	October 27, 2014	Haleakala	Pan-STARRS 1	LIX	2.5 km	MPC · JPL
863760	2014 UC_{275}	—	October 28, 2014	Haleakala	Pan-STARRS 1	·	960 m	MPC · JPL
863761	2014 UF_{275}	—	October 29, 2014	Haleakala	Pan-STARRS 1	·	2.0 km	MPC · JPL
863762	2014 UV_{276}	—	October 21, 2014	Kitt Peak	Spacewatch	·	870 m	MPC · JPL
863763	2014 UD_{278}	—	October 26, 2014	Mount Lemmon	Mount Lemmon Survey	L5	7.4 km	MPC · JPL
863764	2014 UV_{278}	—	October 17, 2014	Mount Lemmon	Mount Lemmon Survey	·	440 m	MPC · JPL
863765	2014 UR_{281}	—	October 30, 2014	Haleakala	Pan-STARRS 1	PHO	600 m	MPC · JPL
863766	2014 UW_{281}	—	October 17, 2014	Mount Lemmon	Mount Lemmon Survey	·	2.1 km	MPC · JPL
863767	2014 UT_{283}	—	October 26, 2014	Mount Lemmon	Mount Lemmon Survey	L5	5.7 km	MPC · JPL
863768	2014 UK_{284}	—	October 29, 2014	Haleakala	Pan-STARRS 1	·	1.5 km	MPC · JPL
863769	2014 UP_{284}	—	November 1, 2013	Mount Lemmon	Mount Lemmon Survey	L5	6.6 km	MPC · JPL
863770	2014 UF_{285}	—	October 22, 2014	Mount Lemmon	Mount Lemmon Survey	·	1.5 km	MPC · JPL
863771	2014 UA_{290}	—	October 26, 2014	Mount Lemmon	Mount Lemmon Survey	L5	7.5 km	MPC · JPL
863772	2014 UW_{290}	—	October 26, 2014	Mount Lemmon	Mount Lemmon Survey	·	1 km	MPC · JPL
863773	2014 UY_{300}	—	September 18, 2014	Haleakala	Pan-STARRS 1	·	2.2 km	MPC · JPL
863774	2014 US_{306}	—	October 28, 2014	Mount Lemmon	Mount Lemmon Survey	L5	6.8 km	MPC · JPL
863775	2014 UV_{308}	—	October 29, 2014	Haleakala	Pan-STARRS 1	L5	6.8 km	MPC · JPL
863776	2014 VF	—	October 10, 2008	Mount Lemmon	Mount Lemmon Survey	·	2.1 km	MPC · JPL
863777	2014 VM	—	November 1, 2014	Catalina	CSS	AMO +1km	1.0 km	MPC · JPL
863778	2014 VQ	—	October 4, 2014	Haleakala	Pan-STARRS 1	AMO · fast	300 m	MPC · JPL
863779	2014 VP_{1}	—	November 8, 2014	Haleakala	Pan-STARRS 1	H	430 m	MPC · JPL
863780	2014 VW_{1}	—	May 14, 2013	Siding Spring	SSS	H	570 m	MPC · JPL
863781	2014 VD_{2}	—	November 12, 2001	Haleakala	NEAT	H	480 m	MPC · JPL
863782	2014 VM_{2}	—	September 20, 2014	Haleakala	Pan-STARRS 1	H	520 m	MPC · JPL
863783	2014 VN_{2}	—	September 20, 2014	Haleakala	Pan-STARRS 1	H	460 m	MPC · JPL
863784	2014 VW_{2}	—	October 1, 2014	Haleakala	Pan-STARRS 1	·	2.0 km	MPC · JPL
863785	2014 VR_{4}	—	September 5, 2010	Mount Lemmon	Mount Lemmon Survey	·	1.0 km	MPC · JPL
863786	2014 VX_{4}	—	October 24, 2003	Kitt Peak	Spacewatch	TIR	2.0 km	MPC · JPL
863787	2014 VN_{5}	—	December 4, 2010	Les Engarouines	L. Bernasconi	·	1.3 km	MPC · JPL
863788	2014 VM_{6}	—	November 1, 2014	Mount Lemmon	Mount Lemmon Survey	·	1.9 km	MPC · JPL
863789	2014 VC_{7}	—	November 18, 2003	Kitt Peak	Spacewatch	ERI	930 m	MPC · JPL
863790	2014 VD_{7}	—	October 24, 2003	Kitt Peak	Spacewatch	·	2.2 km	MPC · JPL
863791	2014 VQ_{8}	—	October 8, 2007	Anderson Mesa	LONEOS	·	440 m	MPC · JPL
863792	2014 VT_{11}	—	September 16, 2010	Kitt Peak	Spacewatch	NYS	870 m	MPC · JPL
863793	2014 VW_{12}	—	September 6, 2014	Mount Lemmon	Mount Lemmon Survey	·	1.9 km	MPC · JPL
863794	2014 VV_{15}	—	September 4, 2014	Haleakala	Pan-STARRS 1	T_{j} (2.97)	2.4 km	MPC · JPL
863795	2014 VZ_{15}	—	September 30, 2014	Mount Lemmon	Mount Lemmon Survey	·	800 m	MPC · JPL
863796	2014 VU_{16}	—	October 23, 2003	Kitt Peak	Spacewatch	·	2.0 km	MPC · JPL
863797	2014 VM_{17}	—	November 20, 2009	Kitt Peak	Spacewatch	·	1.3 km	MPC · JPL
863798	2014 VV_{17}	—	August 31, 2014	Haleakala	Pan-STARRS 1	THM	1.7 km	MPC · JPL
863799	2014 VX_{18}	—	September 19, 2014	Haleakala	Pan-STARRS 1	·	2.3 km	MPC · JPL
863800	2014 VQ_{20}	—	November 12, 2014	Haleakala	Pan-STARRS 1	·	820 m	MPC · JPL

== 863801–863900 ==
back to top

Designation			Discovery			Properties		Ref
Permanent	Provisional	Named after	Date	Site	Discoverer(s)	Category	Diam.	Ref
863801	2014 VC_{21}	—	September 12, 2010	Kitt Peak	Spacewatch	·	880 m	MPC · JPL
863802	2014 VS_{22}	—	November 12, 2014	Haleakala	Pan-STARRS 1	·	1.4 km	MPC · JPL
863803	2014 VV_{22}	—	October 3, 2014	Mount Lemmon	Mount Lemmon Survey	·	840 m	MPC · JPL
863804	2014 VV_{23}	—	November 12, 2014	Haleakala	Pan-STARRS 1	·	820 m	MPC · JPL
863805	2014 VF_{24}	—	September 29, 2010	Mount Lemmon	Mount Lemmon Survey	·	740 m	MPC · JPL
863806	2014 VF_{25}	—	November 4, 1999	Kitt Peak	Spacewatch	MAS	490 m	MPC · JPL
863807	2014 VZ_{29}	—	September 4, 2014	Haleakala	Pan-STARRS 1	·	2.0 km	MPC · JPL
863808	2014 VE_{32}	—	September 27, 2008	Mount Lemmon	Mount Lemmon Survey	HYG	1.9 km	MPC · JPL
863809	2014 VU_{32}	—	November 14, 2014	Kitt Peak	Spacewatch	H	370 m	MPC · JPL
863810	2014 VG_{33}	—	November 14, 2014	Kitt Peak	Spacewatch	H	430 m	MPC · JPL
863811	2014 VP_{33}	—	October 21, 2014	Kitt Peak	Spacewatch	·	420 m	MPC · JPL
863812	2014 VB_{34}	—	October 25, 2014	Kitt Peak	Spacewatch	·	2.5 km	MPC · JPL
863813	2014 VT_{34}	—	September 29, 2010	Mount Lemmon	Mount Lemmon Survey	·	870 m	MPC · JPL
863814	2014 VG_{36}	—	May 16, 2013	Mount Lemmon	Mount Lemmon Survey	V	500 m	MPC · JPL
863815	2014 VP_{36}	—	October 25, 2014	Haleakala	Pan-STARRS 1	·	2.4 km	MPC · JPL
863816	2014 VC_{38}	—	November 3, 2014	Mount Lemmon	Mount Lemmon Survey	H	460 m	MPC · JPL
863817	2014 VF_{39}	—	December 14, 2010	Mount Lemmon	Mount Lemmon Survey	EUN	800 m	MPC · JPL
863818	2014 VT_{39}	—	November 13, 2014	Kitt Peak	Spacewatch	·	790 m	MPC · JPL
863819	2014 VP_{41}	—	November 14, 2014	Kitt Peak	Spacewatch	EOS	1.3 km	MPC · JPL
863820	2014 VS_{41}	—	November 14, 2014	Kitt Peak	Spacewatch	·	1.4 km	MPC · JPL
863821	2014 VU_{41}	—	November 1, 2014	Mount Lemmon	Mount Lemmon Survey	L5	6.3 km	MPC · JPL
863822	2014 VW_{41}	—	November 10, 2014	Haleakala	Pan-STARRS 1	·	1.9 km	MPC · JPL
863823	2014 VR_{42}	—	November 9, 2014	Mount Lemmon	Mount Lemmon Survey	·	2.1 km	MPC · JPL
863824	2014 VW_{42}	—	November 1, 2014	Mount Lemmon	Mount Lemmon Survey	·	2.1 km	MPC · JPL
863825	2014 VJ_{44}	—	November 15, 2014	Mount Lemmon	Mount Lemmon Survey	·	1.2 km	MPC · JPL
863826	2014 WL_{3}	—	November 16, 2014	Catalina	CSS	·	2.0 km	MPC · JPL
863827	2014 WM_{3}	—	September 22, 2014	Haleakala	Pan-STARRS 1	TIR	2.3 km	MPC · JPL
863828	2014 WK_{9}	—	October 17, 1995	Kitt Peak	Spacewatch	NYS	890 m	MPC · JPL
863829	2014 WL_{9}	—	July 18, 2005	Palomar	NEAT	·	990 m	MPC · JPL
863830	2014 WB_{10}	—	October 22, 2014	Kitt Peak	Spacewatch	·	1.3 km	MPC · JPL
863831	2014 WF_{12}	—	October 29, 2014	Kitt Peak	Spacewatch	·	1.1 km	MPC · JPL
863832	2014 WQ_{12}	—	August 28, 2005	Kitt Peak	Spacewatch	·	1.1 km	MPC · JPL
863833	2014 WB_{14}	—	October 28, 2014	Haleakala	Pan-STARRS 1	·	2.1 km	MPC · JPL
863834	2014 WV_{17}	—	November 16, 2014	Mount Lemmon	Mount Lemmon Survey	·	420 m	MPC · JPL
863835	2014 WL_{18}	—	October 4, 2014	Mount Lemmon	Mount Lemmon Survey	TIR	2.1 km	MPC · JPL
863836	2014 WJ_{19}	—	November 17, 2014	Kitt Peak	Spacewatch	GEF	890 m	MPC · JPL
863837	2014 WW_{19}	—	September 25, 2005	Palomar	NEAT	·	1.5 km	MPC · JPL
863838	2014 WX_{20}	—	October 25, 2014	Haleakala	Pan-STARRS 1	·	660 m	MPC · JPL
863839	2014 WG_{23}	—	January 17, 2007	Kitt Peak	Spacewatch	·	780 m	MPC · JPL
863840	2014 WX_{23}	—	November 17, 2014	Mount Lemmon	Mount Lemmon Survey	·	2.0 km	MPC · JPL
863841	2014 WS_{24}	—	October 31, 2007	Mount Lemmon	Mount Lemmon Survey	·	490 m	MPC · JPL
863842	2014 WN_{25}	—	October 22, 2014	Mount Lemmon	Mount Lemmon Survey	(5)	840 m	MPC · JPL
863843	2014 WP_{26}	—	September 23, 2008	Kitt Peak	Spacewatch	HYG	2.0 km	MPC · JPL
863844	2014 WT_{26}	—	November 17, 2014	Mount Lemmon	Mount Lemmon Survey	EOS	1.5 km	MPC · JPL
863845	2014 WF_{27}	—	November 17, 2014	Mount Lemmon	Mount Lemmon Survey	·	1.7 km	MPC · JPL
863846	2014 WM_{30}	—	October 21, 2014	Mount Lemmon	Mount Lemmon Survey	·	1.8 km	MPC · JPL
863847	2014 WJ_{31}	—	October 28, 2014	Haleakala	Pan-STARRS 1	·	1.9 km	MPC · JPL
863848	2014 WD_{32}	—	October 16, 2014	Mount Lemmon	Mount Lemmon Survey	·	1.6 km	MPC · JPL
863849	2014 WR_{33}	—	November 19, 2003	Kitt Peak	Spacewatch	·	1.9 km	MPC · JPL
863850	2014 WX_{33}	—	April 16, 2013	Cerro Tololo-DECam	DECam	JUN	660 m	MPC · JPL
863851	2014 WY_{33}	—	October 26, 2014	Mount Lemmon	Mount Lemmon Survey	H	340 m	MPC · JPL
863852	2014 WN_{35}	—	November 17, 2014	Haleakala	Pan-STARRS 1	·	1.7 km	MPC · JPL
863853	2014 WO_{35}	—	July 6, 2013	Haleakala	Pan-STARRS 1	T_{j} (2.97) · 3:2	4.0 km	MPC · JPL
863854	2014 WF_{41}	—	October 27, 2003	Kitt Peak	Spacewatch	·	630 m	MPC · JPL
863855	2014 WG_{41}	—	October 29, 2005	Kitt Peak	Spacewatch	AEO	850 m	MPC · JPL
863856	2014 WJ_{43}	—	September 22, 2009	Mount Lemmon	Mount Lemmon Survey	·	1.7 km	MPC · JPL
863857	2014 WY_{44}	—	November 17, 2014	Haleakala	Pan-STARRS 1	·	820 m	MPC · JPL
863858	2014 WL_{45}	—	November 7, 2007	Mount Lemmon	Mount Lemmon Survey	·	450 m	MPC · JPL
863859	2014 WP_{45}	—	November 17, 2014	Haleakala	Pan-STARRS 1	·	2.0 km	MPC · JPL
863860	2014 WG_{49}	—	September 20, 2014	Haleakala	Pan-STARRS 1	V	540 m	MPC · JPL
863861	2014 WF_{51}	—	August 19, 2006	Kitt Peak	Spacewatch	·	820 m	MPC · JPL
863862	2014 WD_{53}	—	October 9, 2010	Mount Lemmon	Mount Lemmon Survey	MAS	470 m	MPC · JPL
863863	2014 WQ_{53}	—	November 17, 2014	Haleakala	Pan-STARRS 1	L5	7.3 km	MPC · JPL
863864	2014 WJ_{54}	—	August 19, 2006	Kitt Peak	Spacewatch	NYS	700 m	MPC · JPL
863865	2014 WZ_{54}	—	November 17, 2014	Haleakala	Pan-STARRS 1	·	520 m	MPC · JPL
863866	2014 WS_{55}	—	November 11, 2010	Mount Lemmon	Mount Lemmon Survey	·	910 m	MPC · JPL
863867	2014 WT_{57}	—	October 25, 2014	Haleakala	Pan-STARRS 1	·	1.6 km	MPC · JPL
863868	2014 WS_{58}	—	September 30, 2014	Mount Lemmon	Mount Lemmon Survey	·	1.3 km	MPC · JPL
863869	2014 WA_{59}	—	October 6, 1999	Kitt Peak	Spacewatch	·	680 m	MPC · JPL
863870	2014 WD_{59}	—	November 17, 2014	Haleakala	Pan-STARRS 1	·	1.5 km	MPC · JPL
863871	2014 WR_{59}	—	November 17, 2014	Haleakala	Pan-STARRS 1	(5)	760 m	MPC · JPL
863872	2014 WT_{60}	—	August 24, 2007	Kitt Peak	Spacewatch	·	430 m	MPC · JPL
863873	2014 WY_{60}	—	November 17, 2014	Mount Lemmon	Mount Lemmon Survey	L5	7.1 km	MPC · JPL
863874	2014 WG_{62}	—	September 25, 2014	Mount Lemmon	Mount Lemmon Survey	LIX	2.4 km	MPC · JPL
863875	2014 WB_{63}	—	November 17, 2014	Mount Lemmon	Mount Lemmon Survey	·	2.0 km	MPC · JPL
863876	2014 WR_{65}	—	October 25, 2014	Haleakala	Pan-STARRS 1	H	350 m	MPC · JPL
863877	2014 WZ_{65}	—	October 25, 2014	Haleakala	Pan-STARRS 1	·	1.9 km	MPC · JPL
863878	2014 WK_{66}	—	October 14, 2014	Kitt Peak	Spacewatch	TIR	2.2 km	MPC · JPL
863879	2014 WQ_{66}	—	October 20, 2007	Kitt Peak	Spacewatch	·	540 m	MPC · JPL
863880	2014 WW_{68}	—	November 22, 2009	Kitt Peak	Spacewatch	·	1.3 km	MPC · JPL
863881	2014 WN_{73}	—	October 27, 2008	Kitt Peak	Spacewatch	·	2.5 km	MPC · JPL
863882	2014 WO_{75}	—	November 17, 2014	Mount Lemmon	Mount Lemmon Survey	·	1.7 km	MPC · JPL
863883	2014 WM_{76}	—	November 17, 2014	Mount Lemmon	Mount Lemmon Survey	MAS	530 m	MPC · JPL
863884	2014 WE_{78}	—	November 15, 2003	Kitt Peak	Spacewatch	MAS	550 m	MPC · JPL
863885	2014 WH_{78}	—	November 17, 2014	Mount Lemmon	Mount Lemmon Survey	·	2.2 km	MPC · JPL
863886	2014 WL_{78}	—	November 16, 2014	Mount Lemmon	Mount Lemmon Survey	VER	1.9 km	MPC · JPL
863887	2014 WV_{78}	—	September 16, 2010	Kitt Peak	Spacewatch	NYS	770 m	MPC · JPL
863888	2014 WP_{79}	—	August 31, 2014	Haleakala	Pan-STARRS 1	·	490 m	MPC · JPL
863889	2014 WW_{79}	—	October 22, 2014	Mount Lemmon	Mount Lemmon Survey	·	470 m	MPC · JPL
863890	2014 WN_{80}	—	November 17, 2014	Mount Lemmon	Mount Lemmon Survey	·	1.4 km	MPC · JPL
863891	2014 WX_{80}	—	November 17, 2014	Haleakala	Pan-STARRS 1	·	810 m	MPC · JPL
863892	2014 WA_{85}	—	February 11, 2008	Mount Lemmon	Mount Lemmon Survey	·	820 m	MPC · JPL
863893	2014 WM_{85}	—	November 17, 2014	Mount Lemmon	Mount Lemmon Survey	·	430 m	MPC · JPL
863894	2014 WT_{85}	—	February 11, 2008	Mount Lemmon	Mount Lemmon Survey	·	860 m	MPC · JPL
863895	2014 WF_{90}	—	October 25, 2014	Haleakala	Pan-STARRS 1	·	900 m	MPC · JPL
863896	2014 WF_{91}	—	September 4, 2014	Haleakala	Pan-STARRS 1	·	2.2 km	MPC · JPL
863897	2014 WS_{91}	—	November 17, 2014	Mount Lemmon	Mount Lemmon Survey	·	470 m	MPC · JPL
863898	2014 WR_{92}	—	November 17, 2014	Mount Lemmon	Mount Lemmon Survey	·	370 m	MPC · JPL
863899	2014 WG_{93}	—	November 17, 2014	Mount Lemmon	Mount Lemmon Survey	·	1.2 km	MPC · JPL
863900	2014 WN_{93}	—	October 9, 2008	Mount Lemmon	Mount Lemmon Survey	·	1.7 km	MPC · JPL

== 863901–864000 ==
back to top

Designation			Discovery			Properties		Ref
Permanent	Provisional	Named after	Date	Site	Discoverer(s)	Category	Diam.	Ref
863901	2014 WY_{94}	—	November 17, 2014	Mount Lemmon	Mount Lemmon Survey	·	860 m	MPC · JPL
863902	2014 WX_{95}	—	September 20, 2014	Haleakala	Pan-STARRS 1	·	1.0 km	MPC · JPL
863903	2014 WC_{98}	—	September 24, 2014	Mount Lemmon	Mount Lemmon Survey	·	2.0 km	MPC · JPL
863904	2014 WS_{98}	—	November 17, 2014	Mount Lemmon	Mount Lemmon Survey	·	900 m	MPC · JPL
863905	2014 WV_{99}	—	December 3, 2010	Kitt Peak	Spacewatch	(5)	820 m	MPC · JPL
863906	2014 WA_{100}	—	October 23, 2014	Kitt Peak	Spacewatch	V	540 m	MPC · JPL
863907	2014 WL_{100}	—	September 4, 2010	Kitt Peak	Spacewatch	·	800 m	MPC · JPL
863908	2014 WN_{104}	—	September 24, 2014	Kitt Peak	Spacewatch	·	780 m	MPC · JPL
863909	2014 WS_{104}	—	February 4, 2005	Kitt Peak	Spacewatch	·	1.4 km	MPC · JPL
863910	2014 WQ_{107}	—	November 2, 2007	Kitt Peak	Spacewatch	·	590 m	MPC · JPL
863911	2014 WO_{110}	—	October 5, 2014	Mount Lemmon	Mount Lemmon Survey	LIX	2.0 km	MPC · JPL
863912	2014 WX_{112}	—	October 3, 2014	Mount Lemmon	Mount Lemmon Survey	THB	2.1 km	MPC · JPL
863913	2014 WY_{113}	—	September 20, 2006	Catalina	CSS	H	420 m	MPC · JPL
863914	2014 WF_{117}	—	September 25, 2014	Mount Lemmon	Mount Lemmon Survey	·	2.3 km	MPC · JPL
863915	2014 WO_{122}	—	November 16, 2014	Kitt Peak	Spacewatch	·	1.2 km	MPC · JPL
863916	2014 WP_{124}	—	November 16, 2014	Mount Lemmon	Mount Lemmon Survey	·	810 m	MPC · JPL
863917	2014 WU_{125}	—	November 16, 2014	Mount Lemmon	Mount Lemmon Survey	·	440 m	MPC · JPL
863918	2014 WF_{129}	—	October 17, 2014	Kitt Peak	Spacewatch	·	2.0 km	MPC · JPL
863919	2014 WU_{129}	—	November 18, 2009	Kitt Peak	Spacewatch	·	1.1 km	MPC · JPL
863920	2014 WZ_{129}	—	December 19, 2003	Kitt Peak	Spacewatch	·	800 m	MPC · JPL
863921	2014 WT_{132}	—	November 17, 2014	Haleakala	Pan-STARRS 1	L5	6.2 km	MPC · JPL
863922	2014 WC_{133}	—	November 17, 2014	Haleakala	Pan-STARRS 1	VER	2.0 km	MPC · JPL
863923	2014 WJ_{133}	—	October 30, 2010	Mount Lemmon	Mount Lemmon Survey	NYS	900 m	MPC · JPL
863924	2014 WE_{135}	—	December 14, 2010	Mount Lemmon	Mount Lemmon Survey	·	730 m	MPC · JPL
863925	2014 WV_{137}	—	April 15, 2013	Haleakala	Pan-STARRS 1	NYS	900 m	MPC · JPL
863926	2014 WX_{139}	—	November 17, 2014	Haleakala	Pan-STARRS 1	·	1.2 km	MPC · JPL
863927	2014 WN_{140}	—	November 17, 2014	Haleakala	Pan-STARRS 1	·	860 m	MPC · JPL
863928	2014 WB_{141}	—	April 27, 2012	Haleakala	Pan-STARRS 1	KOR	990 m	MPC · JPL
863929	2014 WD_{141}	—	September 27, 2008	Mount Lemmon	Mount Lemmon Survey	·	2.0 km	MPC · JPL
863930	2014 WH_{142}	—	November 17, 2014	Haleakala	Pan-STARRS 1	H	320 m	MPC · JPL
863931	2014 WS_{142}	—	November 17, 2014	Haleakala	Pan-STARRS 1	·	2.2 km	MPC · JPL
863932	2014 WB_{143}	—	August 31, 2005	Kitt Peak	Spacewatch	MIS	1.7 km	MPC · JPL
863933	2014 WJ_{145}	—	October 29, 2014	Catalina	CSS	·	3.2 km	MPC · JPL
863934	2014 WM_{149}	—	October 25, 2014	Mount Lemmon	Mount Lemmon Survey	·	1.7 km	MPC · JPL
863935	2014 WP_{150}	—	December 2, 2010	Mount Lemmon	Mount Lemmon Survey	(5)	770 m	MPC · JPL
863936	2014 WV_{150}	—	September 2, 2014	Haleakala	Pan-STARRS 1	·	820 m	MPC · JPL
863937	2014 WU_{151}	—	November 17, 2014	Haleakala	Pan-STARRS 1	·	2.7 km	MPC · JPL
863938	2014 WW_{153}	—	December 10, 2010	Kitt Peak	Spacewatch	·	1.1 km	MPC · JPL
863939	2014 WC_{154}	—	September 30, 2003	Kitt Peak	Spacewatch	·	1.9 km	MPC · JPL
863940	2014 WN_{156}	—	September 17, 2010	Mount Lemmon	Mount Lemmon Survey	·	900 m	MPC · JPL
863941	2014 WY_{156}	—	October 25, 2014	Mount Lemmon	Mount Lemmon Survey	·	2.1 km	MPC · JPL
863942	2014 WC_{157}	—	October 25, 2014	Mount Lemmon	Mount Lemmon Survey	NYS	850 m	MPC · JPL
863943	2014 WG_{157}	—	September 24, 2014	Mount Lemmon	Mount Lemmon Survey	·	2.5 km	MPC · JPL
863944	2014 WJ_{157}	—	November 17, 2014	Haleakala	Pan-STARRS 1	·	860 m	MPC · JPL
863945	2014 WY_{157}	—	October 2, 2014	Haleakala	Pan-STARRS 1	·	880 m	MPC · JPL
863946	2014 WN_{162}	—	November 2, 2010	Mount Lemmon	Mount Lemmon Survey	·	1.1 km	MPC · JPL
863947	2014 WE_{164}	—	September 19, 2014	Haleakala	Pan-STARRS 1	TIR	2.3 km	MPC · JPL
863948	2014 WG_{166}	—	May 8, 2013	Haleakala	Pan-STARRS 1	EUN	840 m	MPC · JPL
863949	2014 WV_{166}	—	October 23, 2003	Kitt Peak	Spacewatch	·	870 m	MPC · JPL
863950	2014 WW_{166}	—	October 25, 2014	Kitt Peak	Spacewatch	EUP	2.3 km	MPC · JPL
863951	2014 WM_{167}	—	November 19, 2014	Haleakala	Pan-STARRS 1	·	470 m	MPC · JPL
863952	2014 WR_{169}	—	October 31, 2014	Mount Lemmon	Mount Lemmon Survey	DOR	1.5 km	MPC · JPL
863953	2014 WX_{170}	—	November 20, 2014	Mount Lemmon	Mount Lemmon Survey	·	2.0 km	MPC · JPL
863954	2014 WK_{171}	—	July 13, 2013	Haleakala	Pan-STARRS 1	THM	1.5 km	MPC · JPL
863955	2014 WB_{172}	—	January 15, 2008	Mount Lemmon	Mount Lemmon Survey	MAS	490 m	MPC · JPL
863956	2014 WR_{172}	—	September 13, 2014	Haleakala	Pan-STARRS 1	T_{j} (2.94)	4.2 km	MPC · JPL
863957	2014 WY_{172}	—	August 28, 2014	Haleakala	Pan-STARRS 1	·	1.9 km	MPC · JPL
863958	2014 WB_{173}	—	August 26, 2014	Haleakala	Pan-STARRS 1	PHO	790 m	MPC · JPL
863959	2014 WQ_{173}	—	October 2, 2014	Haleakala	Pan-STARRS 1	·	1.2 km	MPC · JPL
863960	2014 WG_{174}	—	September 19, 2014	Haleakala	Pan-STARRS 1	·	2.2 km	MPC · JPL
863961	2014 WC_{176}	—	October 2, 2014	Haleakala	Pan-STARRS 1	·	1.6 km	MPC · JPL
863962	2014 WD_{176}	—	October 29, 2003	Kitt Peak	Spacewatch	·	710 m	MPC · JPL
863963	2014 WU_{177}	—	August 30, 2014	Haleakala	Pan-STARRS 1	·	700 m	MPC · JPL
863964	2014 WJ_{178}	—	September 2, 2014	Haleakala	Pan-STARRS 1	·	860 m	MPC · JPL
863965	2014 WE_{179}	—	October 15, 2007	Kitt Peak	Spacewatch	·	750 m	MPC · JPL
863966	2014 WZ_{179}	—	December 31, 2007	Mount Lemmon	Mount Lemmon Survey	·	830 m	MPC · JPL
863967	2014 WD_{180}	—	September 6, 2008	Mount Lemmon	Mount Lemmon Survey	·	2.3 km	MPC · JPL
863968	2014 WH_{180}	—	August 25, 2014	Haleakala	Pan-STARRS 1	·	840 m	MPC · JPL
863969	2014 WM_{181}	—	September 25, 2008	Mount Lemmon	Mount Lemmon Survey	·	2.1 km	MPC · JPL
863970	2014 WA_{182}	—	October 2, 2014	Mount Lemmon	Mount Lemmon Survey	·	900 m	MPC · JPL
863971	2014 WM_{182}	—	September 19, 2014	Haleakala	Pan-STARRS 1	·	1.6 km	MPC · JPL
863972	2014 WR_{185}	—	November 20, 2014	Mount Lemmon	Mount Lemmon Survey	·	880 m	MPC · JPL
863973	2014 WK_{186}	—	January 28, 2007	Kitt Peak	Spacewatch	·	930 m	MPC · JPL
863974	2014 WN_{186}	—	January 11, 2008	Mount Lemmon	Mount Lemmon Survey	·	700 m	MPC · JPL
863975	2014 WZ_{186}	—	May 16, 2013	Mount Lemmon	Mount Lemmon Survey	·	1.4 km	MPC · JPL
863976	2014 WM_{191}	—	November 20, 2014	Haleakala	Pan-STARRS 1	·	2.1 km	MPC · JPL
863977	2014 WJ_{192}	—	May 14, 2012	Haleakala	Pan-STARRS 1	·	3.0 km	MPC · JPL
863978	2014 WN_{194}	—	November 21, 2014	Mount Lemmon	Mount Lemmon Survey	V	360 m	MPC · JPL
863979	2014 WO_{194}	—	October 2, 2010	Kitt Peak	Spacewatch	·	790 m	MPC · JPL
863980	2014 WJ_{195}	—	August 13, 2010	Kitt Peak	Spacewatch	·	730 m	MPC · JPL
863981	2014 WM_{196}	—	August 20, 2014	Haleakala	Pan-STARRS 1	·	2.0 km	MPC · JPL
863982	2014 WL_{198}	—	September 20, 2014	Haleakala	Pan-STARRS 1	·	1.7 km	MPC · JPL
863983	2014 WH_{199}	—	October 22, 2003	Sacramento Peak	SDSS	·	1.5 km	MPC · JPL
863984	2014 WH_{200}	—	November 22, 2014	Mount Lemmon	Mount Lemmon Survey	H	490 m	MPC · JPL
863985	2014 WL_{200}	—	November 21, 2014	Mount Lemmon	Mount Lemmon Survey	H	490 m	MPC · JPL
863986	2014 WE_{204}	—	November 17, 2014	Mount Lemmon	Mount Lemmon Survey	·	1.4 km	MPC · JPL
863987	2014 WF_{204}	—	November 1, 2014	Kitt Peak	Spacewatch	·	2.1 km	MPC · JPL
863988	2014 WW_{204}	—	March 15, 2012	Mount Lemmon	Mount Lemmon Survey	·	860 m	MPC · JPL
863989	2014 WX_{205}	—	November 17, 2014	Mount Lemmon	Mount Lemmon Survey	·	960 m	MPC · JPL
863990	2014 WH_{208}	—	November 17, 2014	Mount Lemmon	Mount Lemmon Survey	·	2.2 km	MPC · JPL
863991	2014 WV_{208}	—	October 21, 2014	Mount Lemmon	Mount Lemmon Survey	·	370 m	MPC · JPL
863992	2014 WZ_{209}	—	November 17, 2014	Haleakala	Pan-STARRS 1	EUN	640 m	MPC · JPL
863993	2014 WG_{214}	—	September 4, 2014	Haleakala	Pan-STARRS 1	·	1.8 km	MPC · JPL
863994	2014 WK_{218}	—	November 1, 2007	Mount Lemmon	Mount Lemmon Survey	V	410 m	MPC · JPL
863995	2014 WA_{221}	—	October 29, 2008	Kitt Peak	Spacewatch	·	1.9 km	MPC · JPL
863996	2014 WN_{224}	—	October 28, 2014	Kitt Peak	Spacewatch	·	940 m	MPC · JPL
863997	2014 WP_{225}	—	November 18, 2014	Haleakala	Pan-STARRS 1	·	2.2 km	MPC · JPL
863998	2014 WL_{228}	—	November 18, 2014	Haleakala	Pan-STARRS 1	·	420 m	MPC · JPL
863999	2014 WC_{230}	—	November 18, 2014	Haleakala	Pan-STARRS 1	·	690 m	MPC · JPL
864000	2014 WR_{231}	—	September 14, 2014	Haleakala	Pan-STARRS 1	·	1.2 km	MPC · JPL

back to top
