= List of minor planets: 787001–788000 =

The following is a partial list of minor planets, running from minor-planet number 787001 through 788000, inclusive. The primary data for this and other partial lists is based on JPL's "Small-Body Orbital Elements" and data available from the Minor Planet Center. Critical list information is also provided by the MPC, unless otherwise specified from Lowell Observatory. A detailed description of the table's columns and additional sources are given on the main page including a complete list of every page in this series, and a statistical break-up on the dynamical classification of minor planets.

Also see the summary list of all named bodies in numerical and alphabetical order, and the corresponding naming citations for the number range of this particular list. New namings may only be added to this list after official publication, as the preannouncement of names is condemned by the Working Group for Small Bodies Nomenclature of the International Astronomical Union.

Near-Earth obj.	MBA (inner)	MBA (outer)	Centaur
Mars-crosser	MBA (middle)	Jupiter trojan	Trans-Neptunian obj.
Unclassified

== 787001–787100 ==
Designation			Discovery			Properties		Ref
Permanent	Provisional	Named after	Date	Site	Discoverer(s)	Category	Diam.	Ref
787001	2016 CC_{66}	—	November 28, 2014	Kitt Peak	Spacewatch	EOS	1.4 km	MPC · JPL
787002	2016 CP_{69}	—	September 26, 2006	Mount Lemmon	Mount Lemmon Survey	·	830 m	MPC · JPL
787003	2016 CX_{72}	—	April 6, 2011	Kitt Peak	Spacewatch	THM	1.8 km	MPC · JPL
787004	2016 CQ_{74}	—	March 17, 2012	Mount Lemmon	Mount Lemmon Survey	·	1.1 km	MPC · JPL
787005	2016 CA_{75}	—	October 12, 2010	Mount Lemmon	Mount Lemmon Survey	·	1.0 km	MPC · JPL
787006	2016 CW_{75}	—	November 17, 2014	Mount Lemmon	Mount Lemmon Survey	EOS	1.4 km	MPC · JPL
787007	2016 CQ_{76}	—	March 10, 2007	Kitt Peak	Spacewatch	·	1.1 km	MPC · JPL
787008	2016 CQ_{77}	—	October 24, 2005	Kitt Peak	Spacewatch	·	1.4 km	MPC · JPL
787009	2016 CR_{77}	—	February 5, 2016	Haleakala	Pan-STARRS 1	·	2.1 km	MPC · JPL
787010	2016 CU_{77}	—	February 5, 2016	Haleakala	Pan-STARRS 1	·	1.5 km	MPC · JPL
787011	2016 CP_{80}	—	February 5, 2016	Haleakala	Pan-STARRS 1	·	2.2 km	MPC · JPL
787012	2016 CA_{81}	—	November 20, 2014	Haleakala	Pan-STARRS 1	·	1.6 km	MPC · JPL
787013	2016 CQ_{81}	—	February 7, 2011	Mount Lemmon	Mount Lemmon Survey	·	1.3 km	MPC · JPL
787014	2016 CF_{82}	—	February 5, 2016	Haleakala	Pan-STARRS 1	·	1.5 km	MPC · JPL
787015	2016 CV_{82}	—	November 27, 2014	Haleakala	Pan-STARRS 1	·	2.7 km	MPC · JPL
787016	2016 CA_{85}	—	October 25, 2014	Mount Lemmon	Mount Lemmon Survey	·	1.2 km	MPC · JPL
787017	2016 CE_{86}	—	January 9, 2016	Haleakala	Pan-STARRS 1	·	1.3 km	MPC · JPL
787018	2016 CF_{86}	—	February 5, 2016	Haleakala	Pan-STARRS 1	·	1.4 km	MPC · JPL
787019	2016 CM_{88}	—	March 26, 2007	Kitt Peak	Spacewatch	·	1.6 km	MPC · JPL
787020	2016 CP_{89}	—	February 3, 2016	Mount Lemmon	Mount Lemmon Survey	·	1.1 km	MPC · JPL
787021	2016 CT_{89}	—	January 3, 2016	Haleakala	Pan-STARRS 1	EUN	880 m	MPC · JPL
787022	2016 CS_{91}	—	March 26, 2011	Mount Lemmon	Mount Lemmon Survey	·	1.9 km	MPC · JPL
787023	2016 CL_{92}	—	February 5, 2016	Haleakala	Pan-STARRS 1	·	1.3 km	MPC · JPL
787024	2016 CN_{95}	—	January 4, 2016	Haleakala	Pan-STARRS 1	DOR	1.6 km	MPC · JPL
787025	2016 CR_{95}	—	January 16, 2016	Haleakala	Pan-STARRS 1	·	1.4 km	MPC · JPL
787026	2016 CJ_{96}	—	September 28, 2008	Mount Lemmon	Mount Lemmon Survey	·	2.0 km	MPC · JPL
787027	2016 CW_{96}	—	January 16, 2016	Haleakala	Pan-STARRS 1	·	1.1 km	MPC · JPL
787028	2016 CQ_{99}	—	March 16, 2012	Kitt Peak	Spacewatch	EUN	770 m	MPC · JPL
787029	2016 CS_{101}	—	December 8, 2015	Haleakala	Pan-STARRS 1	·	1.0 km	MPC · JPL
787030	2016 CD_{103}	—	February 5, 2016	Haleakala	Pan-STARRS 1	·	1.5 km	MPC · JPL
787031	2016 CW_{103}	—	September 23, 2014	Mount Lemmon	Mount Lemmon Survey	·	1.1 km	MPC · JPL
787032	2016 CR_{110}	—	January 16, 2016	Haleakala	Pan-STARRS 1	·	1.3 km	MPC · JPL
787033	2016 CG_{113}	—	March 30, 2012	Mount Lemmon	Mount Lemmon Survey	·	1.1 km	MPC · JPL
787034	2016 CC_{117}	—	February 5, 2016	Haleakala	Pan-STARRS 1	·	1.1 km	MPC · JPL
787035	2016 CA_{118}	—	January 4, 2016	Haleakala	Pan-STARRS 1	·	1.3 km	MPC · JPL
787036	2016 CE_{120}	—	November 24, 2009	Kitt Peak	Spacewatch	·	1.7 km	MPC · JPL
787037	2016 CG_{120}	—	January 14, 2016	Haleakala	Pan-STARRS 1	·	1.2 km	MPC · JPL
787038	2016 CZ_{123}	—	January 17, 2016	Haleakala	Pan-STARRS 1	·	1.7 km	MPC · JPL
787039	2016 CG_{124}	—	February 5, 2016	Haleakala	Pan-STARRS 1	·	910 m	MPC · JPL
787040	2016 CU_{124}	—	December 20, 2014	Haleakala	Pan-STARRS 1	·	2.4 km	MPC · JPL
787041	2016 CX_{124}	—	February 5, 2016	Haleakala	Pan-STARRS 1	·	2.5 km	MPC · JPL
787042	2016 CC_{125}	—	December 27, 2006	Mount Lemmon	Mount Lemmon Survey	·	1.5 km	MPC · JPL
787043	2016 CA_{128}	—	December 9, 2015	Haleakala	Pan-STARRS 1	·	1.5 km	MPC · JPL
787044	2016 CG_{140}	—	February 6, 2016	Haleakala	Pan-STARRS 1	EOS	1.2 km	MPC · JPL
787045	2016 CR_{144}	—	February 24, 2012	Kitt Peak	Spacewatch	ADE	1.5 km	MPC · JPL
787046	2016 CY_{145}	—	April 15, 2012	Haleakala	Pan-STARRS 1	·	1.1 km	MPC · JPL
787047	2016 CC_{146}	—	September 19, 2014	Haleakala	Pan-STARRS 1	AGN	850 m	MPC · JPL
787048	2016 CH_{146}	—	January 8, 2016	Haleakala	Pan-STARRS 1	·	1.3 km	MPC · JPL
787049	2016 CD_{151}	—	July 1, 2013	Haleakala	Pan-STARRS 1	·	1.2 km	MPC · JPL
787050	2016 CU_{154}	—	February 1, 2016	Haleakala	Pan-STARRS 1	·	990 m	MPC · JPL
787051	2016 CK_{155}	—	August 28, 2014	Haleakala	Pan-STARRS 1	·	1.1 km	MPC · JPL
787052	2016 CX_{155}	—	April 6, 2008	Mount Lemmon	Mount Lemmon Survey	·	1.1 km	MPC · JPL
787053	2016 CN_{156}	—	October 3, 2014	Kitt Peak	Spacewatch	·	1.4 km	MPC · JPL
787054	2016 CA_{158}	—	January 15, 2016	Haleakala	Pan-STARRS 1	·	1.0 km	MPC · JPL
787055	2016 CB_{158}	—	February 28, 2012	Haleakala	Pan-STARRS 1	·	1.3 km	MPC · JPL
787056	2016 CG_{158}	—	January 15, 2016	Haleakala	Pan-STARRS 1	·	1.5 km	MPC · JPL
787057	2016 CV_{159}	—	January 19, 2007	Mauna Kea	P. A. Wiegert	·	1.1 km	MPC · JPL
787058	2016 CV_{160}	—	September 19, 2014	Haleakala	Pan-STARRS 1	·	1.2 km	MPC · JPL
787059	2016 CR_{162}	—	January 3, 2016	Haleakala	Pan-STARRS 1	·	1.4 km	MPC · JPL
787060	2016 CZ_{162}	—	November 25, 2010	Mount Lemmon	Mount Lemmon Survey	·	1.2 km	MPC · JPL
787061	2016 CO_{163}	—	March 17, 2012	Mount Lemmon	Mount Lemmon Survey	·	1.3 km	MPC · JPL
787062	2016 CX_{164}	—	January 7, 2016	Haleakala	Pan-STARRS 1	·	2.0 km	MPC · JPL
787063	2016 CZ_{164}	—	July 14, 2013	Haleakala	Pan-STARRS 1	EOS	1.4 km	MPC · JPL
787064	2016 CR_{166}	—	November 18, 2006	Mount Lemmon	Mount Lemmon Survey	·	970 m	MPC · JPL
787065	2016 CJ_{169}	—	September 7, 2004	Kitt Peak	Spacewatch	·	1.3 km	MPC · JPL
787066	2016 CY_{169}	—	January 31, 2016	Haleakala	Pan-STARRS 1	·	1.8 km	MPC · JPL
787067	2016 CX_{170}	—	June 16, 2012	Mount Lemmon	Mount Lemmon Survey	·	2.1 km	MPC · JPL
787068	2016 CT_{173}	—	January 28, 2016	Mount Lemmon	Mount Lemmon Survey	MIS	1.5 km	MPC · JPL
787069	2016 CS_{174}	—	February 9, 2016	Mount Lemmon	Mount Lemmon Survey	·	1.4 km	MPC · JPL
787070	2016 CQ_{175}	—	February 28, 2012	Haleakala	Pan-STARRS 1	·	1.2 km	MPC · JPL
787071	2016 CP_{178}	—	January 9, 2016	Haleakala	Pan-STARRS 1	·	1.3 km	MPC · JPL
787072	2016 CZ_{179}	—	October 22, 2014	Catalina	CSS	·	1.4 km	MPC · JPL
787073	2016 CZ_{180}	—	February 9, 2016	Haleakala	Pan-STARRS 1	·	910 m	MPC · JPL
787074	2016 CL_{182}	—	February 9, 2016	Haleakala	Pan-STARRS 1	·	1.4 km	MPC · JPL
787075	2016 CO_{182}	—	January 4, 2016	Haleakala	Pan-STARRS 1	EOS	1.2 km	MPC · JPL
787076	2016 CB_{183}	—	December 9, 2015	Haleakala	Pan-STARRS 1	EOS	1.3 km	MPC · JPL
787077	2016 CD_{184}	—	January 4, 2016	Haleakala	Pan-STARRS 1	·	1.3 km	MPC · JPL
787078	2016 CA_{186}	—	October 1, 2008	Mount Lemmon	Mount Lemmon Survey	·	2.4 km	MPC · JPL
787079	2016 CX_{189}	—	March 24, 2012	Mount Lemmon	Mount Lemmon Survey	HOF	1.8 km	MPC · JPL
787080	2016 CM_{192}	—	January 4, 2016	Haleakala	Pan-STARRS 1	·	1.3 km	MPC · JPL
787081	2016 CZ_{198}	—	February 9, 2016	Haleakala	Pan-STARRS 1	·	1.1 km	MPC · JPL
787082	2016 CE_{199}	—	October 25, 2014	Mount Lemmon	Mount Lemmon Survey	·	1.2 km	MPC · JPL
787083	2016 CJ_{199}	—	March 28, 2011	Mount Lemmon	Mount Lemmon Survey	·	1.6 km	MPC · JPL
787084	2016 CC_{200}	—	November 17, 2014	Haleakala	Pan-STARRS 1	·	2.0 km	MPC · JPL
787085	2016 CB_{201}	—	October 26, 2014	Mount Lemmon	Mount Lemmon Survey	·	1.3 km	MPC · JPL
787086	2016 CM_{201}	—	April 27, 2012	Haleakala	Pan-STARRS 1	·	1.2 km	MPC · JPL
787087	2016 CE_{204}	—	January 27, 2007	Kitt Peak	Spacewatch	MRX	670 m	MPC · JPL
787088	2016 CR_{205}	—	February 9, 2016	Haleakala	Pan-STARRS 1	·	2.1 km	MPC · JPL
787089	2016 CG_{207}	—	January 14, 2011	Mount Lemmon	Mount Lemmon Survey	·	1.8 km	MPC · JPL
787090	2016 CC_{208}	—	February 9, 2016	Haleakala	Pan-STARRS 1	·	1.7 km	MPC · JPL
787091	2016 CR_{208}	—	January 9, 2016	Haleakala	Pan-STARRS 1	·	1.2 km	MPC · JPL
787092	2016 CQ_{209}	—	August 26, 2013	Haleakala	Pan-STARRS 1	EUN	1.0 km	MPC · JPL
787093	2016 CW_{210}	—	February 9, 2016	Haleakala	Pan-STARRS 1	·	1.3 km	MPC · JPL
787094	2016 CD_{212}	—	March 20, 2002	Kitt Peak	Deep Ecliptic Survey	AGN	830 m	MPC · JPL
787095	2016 CG_{212}	—	March 8, 2005	Kitt Peak	Spacewatch	·	2.3 km	MPC · JPL
787096	2016 CL_{215}	—	November 23, 2014	Haleakala	Pan-STARRS 1	·	2.0 km	MPC · JPL
787097	2016 CW_{216}	—	April 27, 2012	Haleakala	Pan-STARRS 1	·	1.3 km	MPC · JPL
787098	2016 CH_{217}	—	August 31, 2013	Haleakala	Pan-STARRS 1	·	1.6 km	MPC · JPL
787099	2016 CM_{217}	—	February 9, 2016	Haleakala	Pan-STARRS 1	VER	1.8 km	MPC · JPL
787100	2016 CO_{219}	—	October 25, 2014	Mount Lemmon	Mount Lemmon Survey	AGN	810 m	MPC · JPL

== 787101–787200 ==
back to top

Designation			Discovery			Properties		Ref
Permanent	Provisional	Named after	Date	Site	Discoverer(s)	Category	Diam.	Ref
787101	2016 CR_{219}	—	January 26, 2006	Mount Lemmon	Mount Lemmon Survey	·	1.4 km	MPC · JPL
787102	2016 CP_{221}	—	May 13, 2012	Mount Lemmon	Mount Lemmon Survey	·	1.2 km	MPC · JPL
787103	2016 CE_{222}	—	July 14, 2013	Haleakala	Pan-STARRS 1	·	1.2 km	MPC · JPL
787104	2016 CQ_{223}	—	November 18, 2014	Mount Lemmon	Mount Lemmon Survey	·	1.7 km	MPC · JPL
787105	2016 CS_{223}	—	February 10, 2016	Haleakala	Pan-STARRS 1	·	1.6 km	MPC · JPL
787106	2016 CC_{224}	—	November 25, 2010	Mount Lemmon	Mount Lemmon Survey	ADE	1.8 km	MPC · JPL
787107	2016 CN_{224}	—	November 3, 2010	Kitt Peak	Spacewatch	·	1.4 km	MPC · JPL
787108	2016 CU_{225}	—	February 5, 2016	Haleakala	Pan-STARRS 1	·	1.3 km	MPC · JPL
787109	2016 CY_{225}	—	February 10, 2016	Haleakala	Pan-STARRS 1	·	1.3 km	MPC · JPL
787110	2016 CM_{226}	—	January 29, 2011	Mount Lemmon	Mount Lemmon Survey	·	1.5 km	MPC · JPL
787111	2016 CC_{227}	—	February 28, 2012	Haleakala	Pan-STARRS 1	JUN	780 m	MPC · JPL
787112	2016 CM_{228}	—	February 10, 2016	Haleakala	Pan-STARRS 1	HNS	830 m	MPC · JPL
787113	2016 CK_{230}	—	November 23, 2006	Mount Lemmon	Mount Lemmon Survey	·	1.1 km	MPC · JPL
787114	2016 CC_{231}	—	February 5, 2016	Mount Lemmon	Mount Lemmon Survey	·	1.4 km	MPC · JPL
787115	2016 CN_{238}	—	January 30, 2016	Haleakala	Pan-STARRS 1	·	1.4 km	MPC · JPL
787116	2016 CB_{239}	—	October 30, 2010	Mount Lemmon	Mount Lemmon Survey	·	1.2 km	MPC · JPL
787117	2016 CR_{240}	—	October 28, 2014	Haleakala	Pan-STARRS 1	·	1.5 km	MPC · JPL
787118	2016 CB_{243}	—	February 3, 2016	Haleakala	Pan-STARRS 1	·	1.3 km	MPC · JPL
787119	2016 CT_{243}	—	December 13, 2006	Kitt Peak	Spacewatch	EUN	690 m	MPC · JPL
787120	2016 CV_{243}	—	February 10, 2016	Haleakala	Pan-STARRS 1	·	1.3 km	MPC · JPL
787121	2016 CW_{248}	—	July 31, 2000	Cerro Tololo	Deep Ecliptic Survey	·	1.1 km	MPC · JPL
787122	2016 CD_{249}	—	January 11, 2016	Haleakala	Pan-STARRS 1	GEF	750 m	MPC · JPL
787123	2016 CM_{250}	—	March 9, 2007	Mount Lemmon	Mount Lemmon Survey	AGN	780 m	MPC · JPL
787124	2016 CB_{252}	—	January 8, 2016	Haleakala	Pan-STARRS 1	·	1.2 km	MPC · JPL
787125	2016 CW_{253}	—	February 10, 2016	Haleakala	Pan-STARRS 1	·	2.2 km	MPC · JPL
787126	2016 CP_{255}	—	January 31, 2016	Haleakala	Pan-STARRS 1	PAD	990 m	MPC · JPL
787127	2016 CN_{258}	—	August 27, 2014	Haleakala	Pan-STARRS 1	GAL	940 m	MPC · JPL
787128	2016 CB_{262}	—	December 12, 2015	Haleakala	Pan-STARRS 1	·	1.2 km	MPC · JPL
787129	2016 CX_{270}	—	February 5, 2016	Haleakala	Pan-STARRS 1	·	1.3 km	MPC · JPL
787130	2016 CR_{271}	—	February 5, 2016	Haleakala	Pan-STARRS 1	·	1.3 km	MPC · JPL
787131	2016 CP_{274}	—	January 16, 2011	Mount Lemmon	Mount Lemmon Survey	·	1.2 km	MPC · JPL
787132	2016 CY_{275}	—	February 11, 2016	Haleakala	Pan-STARRS 1	·	1.1 km	MPC · JPL
787133	2016 CJ_{277}	—	February 12, 2016	Haleakala	Pan-STARRS 1	DOR	2.2 km	MPC · JPL
787134	2016 CN_{277}	—	February 14, 2016	Haleakala	Pan-STARRS 1	DOR	1.3 km	MPC · JPL
787135	2016 CK_{280}	—	September 22, 2008	Mount Lemmon	Mount Lemmon Survey	·	1.5 km	MPC · JPL
787136	2016 CQ_{280}	—	February 10, 2016	Haleakala	Pan-STARRS 1	·	1.5 km	MPC · JPL
787137	2016 CV_{280}	—	March 19, 2007	Mount Lemmon	Mount Lemmon Survey	·	1.1 km	MPC · JPL
787138	2016 CK_{281}	—	February 6, 2016	Haleakala	Pan-STARRS 1	NEM	1.6 km	MPC · JPL
787139	2016 CS_{281}	—	February 10, 2016	Mount Lemmon	Mount Lemmon Survey	·	1.2 km	MPC · JPL
787140	2016 CM_{285}	—	April 15, 2008	Mount Lemmon	Mount Lemmon Survey	·	1.0 km	MPC · JPL
787141	2016 CT_{285}	—	January 18, 2016	Haleakala	Pan-STARRS 1	·	960 m	MPC · JPL
787142	2016 CZ_{286}	—	August 15, 2009	Catalina	CSS	EUN	1.0 km	MPC · JPL
787143	2016 CE_{288}	—	February 10, 2016	Haleakala	Pan-STARRS 1	·	2.2 km	MPC · JPL
787144	2016 CA_{289}	—	February 14, 2016	Haleakala	Pan-STARRS 1	·	1.8 km	MPC · JPL
787145	2016 CF_{289}	—	February 3, 2016	Haleakala	Pan-STARRS 1	·	1.2 km	MPC · JPL
787146	2016 CH_{289}	—	November 22, 2014	Haleakala	Pan-STARRS 1	·	1.4 km	MPC · JPL
787147	2016 CO_{289}	—	August 15, 2013	Haleakala	Pan-STARRS 1	·	1.1 km	MPC · JPL
787148	2016 CX_{289}	—	September 20, 2009	Mount Lemmon	Mount Lemmon Survey	·	1.4 km	MPC · JPL
787149	2016 CA_{290}	—	February 9, 2016	Haleakala	Pan-STARRS 1	AGN	780 m	MPC · JPL
787150	2016 CP_{290}	—	February 11, 2016	Haleakala	Pan-STARRS 1	·	1.6 km	MPC · JPL
787151	2016 CG_{291}	—	May 1, 2012	Mount Lemmon	Mount Lemmon Survey	·	1.4 km	MPC · JPL
787152	2016 CL_{292}	—	February 11, 2016	Haleakala	Pan-STARRS 1	·	1.6 km	MPC · JPL
787153	2016 CT_{293}	—	February 6, 2016	Haleakala	Pan-STARRS 1	·	1.3 km	MPC · JPL
787154	2016 CW_{293}	—	February 9, 2016	Haleakala	Pan-STARRS 1	·	1.5 km	MPC · JPL
787155	2016 CB_{295}	—	September 18, 2014	Haleakala	Pan-STARRS 1	·	1.1 km	MPC · JPL
787156	2016 CP_{295}	—	April 1, 2012	Mount Lemmon	Mount Lemmon Survey	·	1.2 km	MPC · JPL
787157	2016 CU_{295}	—	February 2, 2016	Haleakala	Pan-STARRS 1	·	1.4 km	MPC · JPL
787158	2016 CJ_{296}	—	February 3, 2016	Haleakala	Pan-STARRS 1	·	1.4 km	MPC · JPL
787159	2016 CD_{298}	—	September 1, 2013	Mount Lemmon	Mount Lemmon Survey	·	1.4 km	MPC · JPL
787160	2016 CE_{298}	—	February 4, 2016	Haleakala	Pan-STARRS 1	·	1.5 km	MPC · JPL
787161	2016 CG_{299}	—	January 3, 2011	Mount Lemmon	Mount Lemmon Survey	GEF	800 m	MPC · JPL
787162	2016 CD_{300}	—	January 26, 2007	Kitt Peak	Spacewatch	·	1.3 km	MPC · JPL
787163	2016 CE_{303}	—	February 5, 2016	Haleakala	Pan-STARRS 1	·	1.2 km	MPC · JPL
787164	2016 CS_{303}	—	February 8, 2011	Mount Lemmon	Mount Lemmon Survey	KOR	960 m	MPC · JPL
787165	2016 CY_{303}	—	January 4, 2011	Mount Lemmon	Mount Lemmon Survey	(13314)	1.2 km	MPC · JPL
787166	2016 CZ_{303}	—	February 5, 2016	Haleakala	Pan-STARRS 1	·	1.3 km	MPC · JPL
787167	2016 CQ_{304}	—	March 25, 2007	Mount Lemmon	Mount Lemmon Survey	·	1.5 km	MPC · JPL
787168	2016 CH_{305}	—	November 27, 2014	Haleakala	Pan-STARRS 1	·	1.3 km	MPC · JPL
787169	2016 CQ_{305}	—	November 8, 2010	Mount Lemmon	Mount Lemmon Survey	EUN	790 m	MPC · JPL
787170	2016 CX_{305}	—	August 15, 2013	Haleakala	Pan-STARRS 1	EOS	1.2 km	MPC · JPL
787171	2016 CL_{306}	—	September 14, 2013	Mount Lemmon	Mount Lemmon Survey	·	1.6 km	MPC · JPL
787172	2016 CY_{306}	—	August 12, 2013	Haleakala	Pan-STARRS 1	·	1.4 km	MPC · JPL
787173	2016 CN_{307}	—	February 6, 2016	Haleakala	Pan-STARRS 1	·	1.3 km	MPC · JPL
787174	2016 CZ_{307}	—	January 31, 2006	Kitt Peak	Spacewatch	·	1.6 km	MPC · JPL
787175	2016 CB_{308}	—	February 9, 2016	Haleakala	Pan-STARRS 1	·	1.6 km	MPC · JPL
787176	2016 CW_{308}	—	January 17, 2007	Kitt Peak	Spacewatch	·	1.2 km	MPC · JPL
787177	2016 CH_{310}	—	February 9, 2016	Haleakala	Pan-STARRS 1	MIS	2.1 km	MPC · JPL
787178	2016 CD_{311}	—	November 20, 2014	Mount Lemmon	Mount Lemmon Survey	·	2.4 km	MPC · JPL
787179	2016 CR_{311}	—	September 6, 2014	Mount Lemmon	Mount Lemmon Survey	·	2.4 km	MPC · JPL
787180	2016 CT_{311}	—	February 10, 2016	Haleakala	Pan-STARRS 1	·	1.3 km	MPC · JPL
787181	2016 CW_{312}	—	February 10, 2016	Haleakala	Pan-STARRS 1	·	1.3 km	MPC · JPL
787182	2016 CB_{313}	—	January 23, 2011	Mount Lemmon	Mount Lemmon Survey	·	1.2 km	MPC · JPL
787183	2016 CL_{313}	—	November 9, 2004	Mauna Kea	P. A. Wiegert, A. Papadimos	·	1.3 km	MPC · JPL
787184	2016 CV_{313}	—	February 5, 2011	Mount Lemmon	Mount Lemmon Survey	AEO	890 m	MPC · JPL
787185	2016 CX_{314}	—	January 27, 2015	Haleakala	Pan-STARRS 1	·	2.3 km	MPC · JPL
787186	2016 CF_{315}	—	February 11, 2016	Haleakala	Pan-STARRS 1	·	1.2 km	MPC · JPL
787187	2016 CH_{315}	—	September 2, 2014	Haleakala	Pan-STARRS 1	·	1.8 km	MPC · JPL
787188	2016 CT_{315}	—	January 27, 2007	Mount Lemmon	Mount Lemmon Survey	·	1.2 km	MPC · JPL
787189	2016 CS_{316}	—	February 28, 2012	Haleakala	Pan-STARRS 1	·	1.2 km	MPC · JPL
787190	2016 CN_{317}	—	May 21, 2012	Haleakala	Pan-STARRS 1	·	1.6 km	MPC · JPL
787191	2016 CP_{317}	—	September 14, 2013	Haleakala	Pan-STARRS 1	·	2.0 km	MPC · JPL
787192	2016 CQ_{317}	—	November 21, 2014	Haleakala	Pan-STARRS 1	·	1.2 km	MPC · JPL
787193	2016 CL_{318}	—	November 26, 2014	Haleakala	Pan-STARRS 1	·	1.5 km	MPC · JPL
787194	2016 CU_{318}	—	January 30, 2011	Haleakala	Pan-STARRS 1	·	1.4 km	MPC · JPL
787195	2016 CT_{320}	—	February 25, 2011	Mount Lemmon	Mount Lemmon Survey	·	1.5 km	MPC · JPL
787196	2016 CW_{321}	—	February 12, 2016	Haleakala	Pan-STARRS 1	·	1.4 km	MPC · JPL
787197	2016 CQ_{322}	—	February 14, 2016	Haleakala	Pan-STARRS 1	·	2.2 km	MPC · JPL
787198	2016 CQ_{325}	—	February 5, 2016	Haleakala	Pan-STARRS 1	EOS	1.2 km	MPC · JPL
787199	2016 CO_{329}	—	February 28, 2012	Haleakala	Pan-STARRS 1	·	1.2 km	MPC · JPL
787200	2016 CE_{330}	—	February 10, 2016	Haleakala	Pan-STARRS 1	TIR	2.6 km	MPC · JPL

== 787201–787300 ==
back to top

Designation			Discovery			Properties		Ref
Permanent	Provisional	Named after	Date	Site	Discoverer(s)	Category	Diam.	Ref
787201	2016 CT_{333}	—	February 6, 2016	Haleakala	Pan-STARRS 1	·	1.2 km	MPC · JPL
787202	2016 CG_{337}	—	February 11, 2016	Haleakala	Pan-STARRS 1	·	1.9 km	MPC · JPL
787203	2016 CH_{337}	—	February 6, 2016	Haleakala	Pan-STARRS 1	·	2.1 km	MPC · JPL
787204	2016 CM_{338}	—	February 6, 2016	Haleakala	Pan-STARRS 1	·	1.4 km	MPC · JPL
787205	2016 CN_{339}	—	February 11, 2016	Haleakala	Pan-STARRS 1	HYG	2.0 km	MPC · JPL
787206	2016 CT_{339}	—	February 9, 2011	Mount Lemmon	Mount Lemmon Survey	AGN	800 m	MPC · JPL
787207	2016 CP_{340}	—	February 5, 2016	Haleakala	Pan-STARRS 1	·	1.9 km	MPC · JPL
787208	2016 CY_{340}	—	February 9, 2016	Haleakala	Pan-STARRS 1	·	1.5 km	MPC · JPL
787209	2016 CF_{341}	—	February 4, 2016	Haleakala	Pan-STARRS 1	·	1.3 km	MPC · JPL
787210	2016 CX_{341}	—	February 10, 2016	Haleakala	Pan-STARRS 1	·	1.5 km	MPC · JPL
787211	2016 CZ_{341}	—	February 10, 2016	Haleakala	Pan-STARRS 1	·	1.9 km	MPC · JPL
787212	2016 CC_{343}	—	February 5, 2016	Haleakala	Pan-STARRS 1	·	1.3 km	MPC · JPL
787213	2016 CU_{345}	—	February 5, 2016	Haleakala	Pan-STARRS 1	·	1.2 km	MPC · JPL
787214	2016 CT_{346}	—	February 9, 2016	Mount Lemmon	Mount Lemmon Survey	·	840 m	MPC · JPL
787215	2016 CV_{347}	—	February 11, 2016	Haleakala	Pan-STARRS 1	·	1.2 km	MPC · JPL
787216	2016 CD_{348}	—	February 5, 2016	Haleakala	Pan-STARRS 1	·	1.1 km	MPC · JPL
787217	2016 CG_{349}	—	February 10, 2016	Haleakala	Pan-STARRS 1	·	2.4 km	MPC · JPL
787218	2016 CE_{350}	—	February 9, 2016	Haleakala	Pan-STARRS 1	·	1.9 km	MPC · JPL
787219	2016 CN_{350}	—	March 28, 2012	Mount Lemmon	Mount Lemmon Survey	·	1.1 km	MPC · JPL
787220	2016 CS_{351}	—	February 5, 2016	Haleakala	Pan-STARRS 1	EOS	1.4 km	MPC · JPL
787221	2016 CA_{352}	—	February 5, 2016	Haleakala	Pan-STARRS 1	·	1.6 km	MPC · JPL
787222	2016 CC_{352}	—	February 6, 2016	Mount Lemmon	Mount Lemmon Survey	·	2.9 km	MPC · JPL
787223	2016 CF_{352}	—	February 5, 2016	Haleakala	Pan-STARRS 1	·	780 m	MPC · JPL
787224	2016 CJ_{352}	—	February 5, 2016	Haleakala	Pan-STARRS 1	EOS	1.3 km	MPC · JPL
787225	2016 CM_{352}	—	September 30, 2005	Mount Lemmon	Mount Lemmon Survey	(12739)	1.2 km	MPC · JPL
787226	2016 CO_{352}	—	February 10, 2016	Haleakala	Pan-STARRS 1	·	1.4 km	MPC · JPL
787227	2016 CC_{353}	—	February 1, 2016	Haleakala	Pan-STARRS 1	HOF	1.9 km	MPC · JPL
787228	2016 CU_{356}	—	February 5, 2016	Haleakala	Pan-STARRS 1	·	2.1 km	MPC · JPL
787229	2016 CW_{356}	—	February 11, 2016	Haleakala	Pan-STARRS 1	·	1.5 km	MPC · JPL
787230	2016 CX_{356}	—	February 9, 2016	Haleakala	Pan-STARRS 1	KOR	970 m	MPC · JPL
787231	2016 CT_{358}	—	February 9, 2016	Haleakala	Pan-STARRS 1	·	1.1 km	MPC · JPL
787232	2016 CX_{358}	—	October 5, 2005	Mount Lemmon	Mount Lemmon Survey	·	1.1 km	MPC · JPL
787233	2016 CZ_{358}	—	February 10, 2016	Mount Lemmon	Mount Lemmon Survey	AGN	780 m	MPC · JPL
787234	2016 CB_{360}	—	February 11, 2016	Haleakala	Pan-STARRS 1	·	1.4 km	MPC · JPL
787235	2016 CM_{360}	—	February 5, 2016	Haleakala	Pan-STARRS 1	·	1.6 km	MPC · JPL
787236	2016 CW_{364}	—	February 11, 2016	Haleakala	Pan-STARRS 1	·	1.4 km	MPC · JPL
787237	2016 CK_{366}	—	February 6, 2016	Haleakala	Pan-STARRS 1	L4	6.5 km	MPC · JPL
787238	2016 CP_{366}	—	February 5, 2016	Haleakala	Pan-STARRS 1	·	1.3 km	MPC · JPL
787239	2016 CE_{367}	—	February 9, 2016	Haleakala	Pan-STARRS 1	·	1.3 km	MPC · JPL
787240	2016 CK_{367}	—	February 9, 2016	Haleakala	Pan-STARRS 1	·	1.5 km	MPC · JPL
787241	2016 CF_{368}	—	February 11, 2016	Haleakala	Pan-STARRS 1	·	1.2 km	MPC · JPL
787242	2016 CT_{368}	—	February 11, 2016	Haleakala	Pan-STARRS 1	VER	2.2 km	MPC · JPL
787243	2016 CO_{369}	—	February 12, 2016	Mount Lemmon	Mount Lemmon Survey	EMA	2.1 km	MPC · JPL
787244	2016 CC_{370}	—	February 1, 2016	Haleakala	Pan-STARRS 1	·	1.2 km	MPC · JPL
787245	2016 CE_{370}	—	February 6, 2016	Haleakala	Pan-STARRS 1	·	1.4 km	MPC · JPL
787246	2016 CO_{370}	—	February 6, 2016	Haleakala	Pan-STARRS 1	DOR	1.9 km	MPC · JPL
787247	2016 CS_{370}	—	February 9, 2016	Haleakala	Pan-STARRS 1	·	1.3 km	MPC · JPL
787248	2016 CU_{370}	—	November 16, 2009	Mount Lemmon	Mount Lemmon Survey	·	1.7 km	MPC · JPL
787249	2016 CW_{370}	—	February 6, 2016	Haleakala	Pan-STARRS 1	·	1.9 km	MPC · JPL
787250	2016 CY_{370}	—	February 11, 2016	Haleakala	Pan-STARRS 1	·	1.4 km	MPC · JPL
787251	2016 CN_{371}	—	February 6, 2016	Mount Lemmon	Mount Lemmon Survey	HNS	850 m	MPC · JPL
787252	2016 CO_{371}	—	January 27, 2011	Mount Lemmon	Mount Lemmon Survey	·	1.4 km	MPC · JPL
787253	2016 CP_{371}	—	February 5, 2016	Haleakala	Pan-STARRS 1	DOR	1.5 km	MPC · JPL
787254	2016 CV_{371}	—	February 6, 2016	Mount Lemmon	Mount Lemmon Survey	AST	1.3 km	MPC · JPL
787255	2016 CC_{372}	—	February 5, 2016	Haleakala	Pan-STARRS 1	AGN	770 m	MPC · JPL
787256	2016 CP_{372}	—	February 10, 2016	Haleakala	Pan-STARRS 1	·	1.3 km	MPC · JPL
787257	2016 CQ_{372}	—	February 6, 2016	Haleakala	Pan-STARRS 1	AGN	790 m	MPC · JPL
787258	2016 CU_{372}	—	February 11, 2016	Haleakala	Pan-STARRS 1	·	1.3 km	MPC · JPL
787259	2016 CV_{372}	—	February 5, 2016	Haleakala	Pan-STARRS 1	·	1.3 km	MPC · JPL
787260	2016 CW_{372}	—	February 4, 2016	Haleakala	Pan-STARRS 1	JUN	730 m	MPC · JPL
787261	2016 CJ_{373}	—	February 5, 2016	Haleakala	Pan-STARRS 1	·	1.1 km	MPC · JPL
787262	2016 CF_{374}	—	November 22, 2014	Haleakala	Pan-STARRS 1	VER	1.8 km	MPC · JPL
787263	2016 CF_{375}	—	February 9, 2016	Mount Lemmon	Mount Lemmon Survey	·	980 m	MPC · JPL
787264	2016 CJ_{375}	—	February 1, 2016	Haleakala	Pan-STARRS 1	·	1.1 km	MPC · JPL
787265	2016 CO_{375}	—	February 10, 2016	Haleakala	Pan-STARRS 1	HNS	740 m	MPC · JPL
787266	2016 CU_{376}	—	February 14, 2016	Mount Lemmon	Mount Lemmon Survey	·	1.5 km	MPC · JPL
787267	2016 CA_{377}	—	February 10, 2016	Haleakala	Pan-STARRS 1	·	960 m	MPC · JPL
787268	2016 CJ_{379}	—	November 17, 2014	Haleakala	Pan-STARRS 1	·	1.4 km	MPC · JPL
787269	2016 CR_{379}	—	February 10, 2016	Haleakala	Pan-STARRS 1	EOS	1.3 km	MPC · JPL
787270	2016 CS_{380}	—	February 5, 2016	Haleakala	Pan-STARRS 1	·	1.2 km	MPC · JPL
787271	2016 CQ_{381}	—	February 5, 2016	Haleakala	Pan-STARRS 1	·	1.2 km	MPC · JPL
787272	2016 CR_{381}	—	February 11, 2016	Haleakala	Pan-STARRS 1	·	2.1 km	MPC · JPL
787273	2016 CS_{381}	—	February 16, 2010	Kitt Peak	Spacewatch	·	2.1 km	MPC · JPL
787274	2016 CY_{382}	—	November 28, 2014	Haleakala	Pan-STARRS 1	·	2.3 km	MPC · JPL
787275	2016 CD_{383}	—	February 10, 2016	Mount Lemmon	Mount Lemmon Survey	·	2.7 km	MPC · JPL
787276	2016 CQ_{386}	—	February 3, 2016	Haleakala	Pan-STARRS 1	·	1.4 km	MPC · JPL
787277	2016 CV_{386}	—	March 3, 2006	Kitt Peak	Spacewatch	·	1.5 km	MPC · JPL
787278	2016 CR_{388}	—	February 11, 2016	Haleakala	Pan-STARRS 1	·	1.3 km	MPC · JPL
787279	2016 CD_{390}	—	September 15, 2013	Mount Lemmon	Mount Lemmon Survey	·	1.8 km	MPC · JPL
787280	2016 CB_{392}	—	February 5, 2016	Haleakala	Pan-STARRS 1	AGN	810 m	MPC · JPL
787281	2016 CF_{392}	—	February 4, 2016	Haleakala	Pan-STARRS 1	·	1.2 km	MPC · JPL
787282	2016 CJ_{394}	—	February 9, 2016	Haleakala	Pan-STARRS 1	TRE	2.2 km	MPC · JPL
787283	2016 CL_{394}	—	September 1, 2013	Haleakala	Pan-STARRS 1	·	2.1 km	MPC · JPL
787284	2016 CQ_{400}	—	February 9, 2016	Haleakala	Pan-STARRS 1	·	1.7 km	MPC · JPL
787285	2016 CQ_{401}	—	February 6, 2016	Haleakala	Pan-STARRS 1	·	2.5 km	MPC · JPL
787286	2016 CZ_{401}	—	February 7, 2016	Mount Lemmon	Mount Lemmon Survey	GAL	1.1 km	MPC · JPL
787287	2016 CA_{402}	—	February 5, 2016	Haleakala	Pan-STARRS 1	·	2.3 km	MPC · JPL
787288	2016 CC_{402}	—	February 10, 2016	Haleakala	Pan-STARRS 1	·	930 m	MPC · JPL
787289	2016 CK_{402}	—	February 6, 2016	Haleakala	Pan-STARRS 1	·	1.4 km	MPC · JPL
787290	2016 CN_{402}	—	February 10, 2016	Haleakala	Pan-STARRS 1	·	1.3 km	MPC · JPL
787291	2016 CQ_{403}	—	February 5, 2016	Haleakala	Pan-STARRS 1	·	1.3 km	MPC · JPL
787292	2016 CB_{408}	—	February 6, 2016	Haleakala	Pan-STARRS 1	·	1.3 km	MPC · JPL
787293	2016 CT_{410}	—	October 31, 2005	Kitt Peak	Spacewatch	AGN	820 m	MPC · JPL
787294	2016 CA_{411}	—	February 10, 2016	Haleakala	Pan-STARRS 1	·	2.1 km	MPC · JPL
787295	2016 CY_{412}	—	February 6, 2016	Haleakala	Pan-STARRS 1	·	1.2 km	MPC · JPL
787296	2016 CB_{414}	—	February 5, 2016	Haleakala	Pan-STARRS 1	·	1.3 km	MPC · JPL
787297	2016 CC_{414}	—	February 1, 2016	Haleakala	Pan-STARRS 1	·	1.3 km	MPC · JPL
787298	2016 CM_{414}	—	February 11, 2016	Haleakala	Pan-STARRS 1	·	1.3 km	MPC · JPL
787299	2016 CN_{414}	—	February 11, 2016	Haleakala	Pan-STARRS 1	·	1.2 km	MPC · JPL
787300	2016 CW_{414}	—	February 6, 2016	Haleakala	Pan-STARRS 1	·	1.3 km	MPC · JPL

== 787301–787400 ==
back to top

Designation			Discovery			Properties		Ref
Permanent	Provisional	Named after	Date	Site	Discoverer(s)	Category	Diam.	Ref
787301	2016 CE_{415}	—	February 9, 2016	Haleakala	Pan-STARRS 1	·	1.3 km	MPC · JPL
787302	2016 CY_{415}	—	February 2, 2016	Haleakala	Pan-STARRS 1	HOF	1.7 km	MPC · JPL
787303	2016 CF_{416}	—	December 4, 2010	Mount Lemmon	Mount Lemmon Survey	·	1.2 km	MPC · JPL
787304	2016 CJ_{416}	—	February 2, 2016	Haleakala	Pan-STARRS 1	·	1.2 km	MPC · JPL
787305	2016 CF_{417}	—	February 5, 2016	Haleakala	Pan-STARRS 1	HOF	1.6 km	MPC · JPL
787306	2016 CK_{423}	—	February 9, 2016	Haleakala	Pan-STARRS 1	·	2.2 km	MPC · JPL
787307	2016 CR_{423}	—	February 6, 2016	Haleakala	Pan-STARRS 1	·	1.9 km	MPC · JPL
787308	2016 CD_{429}	—	February 11, 2016	Haleakala	Pan-STARRS 1	·	1.8 km	MPC · JPL
787309	2016 CV_{429}	—	February 10, 2016	Haleakala	Pan-STARRS 1	·	1.9 km	MPC · JPL
787310	2016 CB_{430}	—	February 10, 2016	Haleakala	Pan-STARRS 1	·	1.7 km	MPC · JPL
787311	2016 CC_{430}	—	November 21, 2014	Haleakala	Pan-STARRS 1	·	1.3 km	MPC · JPL
787312	2016 CG_{430}	—	February 9, 2016	Haleakala	Pan-STARRS 1	·	1.4 km	MPC · JPL
787313	2016 DY_{3}	—	February 11, 2016	Haleakala	Pan-STARRS 1	·	1.2 km	MPC · JPL
787314	2016 DL_{5}	—	January 27, 2007	Mount Lemmon	Mount Lemmon Survey	·	1.3 km	MPC · JPL
787315	2016 DW_{6}	—	February 3, 2016	Haleakala	Pan-STARRS 1	·	1.4 km	MPC · JPL
787316	2016 DL_{7}	—	January 8, 2016	Haleakala	Pan-STARRS 1	·	1.1 km	MPC · JPL
787317	2016 DL_{9}	—	February 11, 2016	Haleakala	Pan-STARRS 1	WIT	740 m	MPC · JPL
787318	2016 DW_{9}	—	January 27, 2007	Mount Lemmon	Mount Lemmon Survey	·	1.0 km	MPC · JPL
787319	2016 DR_{19}	—	August 15, 2013	Haleakala	Pan-STARRS 1	·	1.4 km	MPC · JPL
787320	2016 DX_{19}	—	September 10, 2007	Mount Lemmon	Mount Lemmon Survey	·	2.1 km	MPC · JPL
787321	2016 DA_{23}	—	April 27, 2012	Haleakala	Pan-STARRS 1	·	1.2 km	MPC · JPL
787322	2016 DR_{24}	—	October 15, 2014	Kitt Peak	Spacewatch	DOR	1.8 km	MPC · JPL
787323	2016 DU_{24}	—	February 27, 2016	Mount Lemmon	Mount Lemmon Survey	·	1.6 km	MPC · JPL
787324	2016 DE_{25}	—	December 2, 2010	Mount Lemmon	Mount Lemmon Survey	·	1.1 km	MPC · JPL
787325	2016 DK_{32}	—	February 27, 2016	Mount Lemmon	Mount Lemmon Survey	·	2.0 km	MPC · JPL
787326	2016 DM_{33}	—	January 14, 2011	Mount Lemmon	Mount Lemmon Survey	·	1.3 km	MPC · JPL
787327	2016 DK_{34}	—	February 28, 2016	Mount Lemmon	Mount Lemmon Survey	·	1.1 km	MPC · JPL
787328	2016 DQ_{34}	—	April 15, 2012	Haleakala	Pan-STARRS 1	·	1.3 km	MPC · JPL
787329	2016 DF_{35}	—	April 29, 2011	Mount Lemmon	Mount Lemmon Survey	THM	1.8 km	MPC · JPL
787330	2016 DT_{35}	—	April 24, 2012	Kitt Peak	Spacewatch	·	1.4 km	MPC · JPL
787331	2016 DL_{37}	—	February 29, 2016	Haleakala	Pan-STARRS 1	·	2.3 km	MPC · JPL
787332	2016 DO_{37}	—	February 28, 2016	Mount Lemmon	Mount Lemmon Survey	·	1.4 km	MPC · JPL
787333	2016 DS_{40}	—	September 19, 2014	Haleakala	Pan-STARRS 1	·	1.2 km	MPC · JPL
787334	2016 DU_{40}	—	February 29, 2016	Haleakala	Pan-STARRS 1	DOR	2.0 km	MPC · JPL
787335	2016 DQ_{41}	—	February 28, 2016	Mount Lemmon	Mount Lemmon Survey	·	2.3 km	MPC · JPL
787336	2016 DS_{41}	—	February 29, 2016	Haleakala	Pan-STARRS 1	·	1.9 km	MPC · JPL
787337	2016 DY_{41}	—	August 28, 2013	Mount Lemmon	Mount Lemmon Survey	·	1.3 km	MPC · JPL
787338	2016 DC_{42}	—	February 16, 2016	Mount Lemmon	Mount Lemmon Survey	·	1.4 km	MPC · JPL
787339	2016 DV_{42}	—	February 27, 2016	Mount Lemmon	Mount Lemmon Survey	·	1.4 km	MPC · JPL
787340	2016 DS_{43}	—	February 28, 2016	Mount Lemmon	Mount Lemmon Survey	GEF	860 m	MPC · JPL
787341	2016 DO_{46}	—	October 24, 2014	Kitt Peak	Spacewatch	·	1.1 km	MPC · JPL
787342	2016 EE_{3}	—	January 31, 2016	Haleakala	Pan-STARRS 1	MRX	680 m	MPC · JPL
787343	2016 EY_{5}	—	February 11, 2016	Haleakala	Pan-STARRS 1	·	1.3 km	MPC · JPL
787344	2016 EU_{6}	—	February 11, 2016	Haleakala	Pan-STARRS 1	·	1.2 km	MPC · JPL
787345	2016 EN_{7}	—	January 8, 2016	Haleakala	Pan-STARRS 1	·	3.4 km	MPC · JPL
787346	2016 EM_{11}	—	March 3, 2016	Haleakala	Pan-STARRS 1	·	1.3 km	MPC · JPL
787347	2016 EF_{13}	—	March 3, 2016	Haleakala	Pan-STARRS 1	GAL	1.1 km	MPC · JPL
787348	2016 EG_{17}	—	March 3, 2016	Haleakala	Pan-STARRS 1	·	2.0 km	MPC · JPL
787349	2016 ES_{17}	—	November 27, 2014	Haleakala	Pan-STARRS 1	·	1.8 km	MPC · JPL
787350	2016 ET_{18}	—	March 3, 2016	Haleakala	Pan-STARRS 1	·	2.7 km	MPC · JPL
787351	2016 EB_{20}	—	March 3, 2016	Haleakala	Pan-STARRS 1	·	2.2 km	MPC · JPL
787352	2016 EJ_{20}	—	March 3, 2016	Haleakala	Pan-STARRS 1	·	1.7 km	MPC · JPL
787353	2016 ES_{20}	—	January 28, 2011	Mount Lemmon	Mount Lemmon Survey	·	1.6 km	MPC · JPL
787354	2016 ET_{21}	—	March 3, 2016	Haleakala	Pan-STARRS 1	·	1.5 km	MPC · JPL
787355	2016 EY_{21}	—	March 3, 2016	Haleakala	Pan-STARRS 1	·	1.3 km	MPC · JPL
787356	2016 EA_{22}	—	July 13, 2013	Haleakala	Pan-STARRS 1	JUN	840 m	MPC · JPL
787357	2016 EF_{24}	—	November 26, 2014	Haleakala	Pan-STARRS 1	·	1.6 km	MPC · JPL
787358	2016 EF_{36}	—	February 5, 2011	Haleakala	Pan-STARRS 1	·	1.6 km	MPC · JPL
787359	2016 EX_{36}	—	March 3, 2016	Haleakala	Pan-STARRS 1	·	1.5 km	MPC · JPL
787360	2016 EZ_{38}	—	March 25, 2012	Kitt Peak	Spacewatch	EUN	760 m	MPC · JPL
787361	2016 EW_{39}	—	October 25, 2014	Calar Alto	S. Mottola, S. Hellmich	·	2.5 km	MPC · JPL
787362	2016 EZ_{39}	—	February 25, 2012	Mount Lemmon	Mount Lemmon Survey	·	1.1 km	MPC · JPL
787363	2016 EE_{40}	—	February 10, 2016	Haleakala	Pan-STARRS 1	EOS	1.4 km	MPC · JPL
787364	2016 EY_{43}	—	April 2, 2006	Kitt Peak	Spacewatch	·	1.8 km	MPC · JPL
787365	2016 EQ_{45}	—	December 13, 2006	Kitt Peak	Spacewatch	·	1.1 km	MPC · JPL
787366	2016 EZ_{45}	—	April 24, 2003	Kitt Peak	Spacewatch	·	1.2 km	MPC · JPL
787367	2016 ET_{47}	—	August 25, 2014	Haleakala	Pan-STARRS 1	·	1.4 km	MPC · JPL
787368	2016 EQ_{49}	—	October 23, 2008	Kitt Peak	Spacewatch	·	1.8 km	MPC · JPL
787369	2016 EP_{61}	—	January 18, 2016	Haleakala	Pan-STARRS 1	·	1.5 km	MPC · JPL
787370	2016 EB_{62}	—	March 4, 2016	Haleakala	Pan-STARRS 1	·	1.8 km	MPC · JPL
787371	2016 EU_{62}	—	January 8, 2010	Kitt Peak	Spacewatch	·	1.8 km	MPC · JPL
787372	2016 EX_{63}	—	March 4, 2016	Haleakala	Pan-STARRS 1	JUN	1.0 km	MPC · JPL
787373	2016 EC_{66}	—	February 3, 2011	Piszkés-tető	K. Sárneczky, Z. Kuli	·	1.4 km	MPC · JPL
787374	2016 ER_{68}	—	October 17, 2014	Mount Lemmon	Mount Lemmon Survey	DOR	1.8 km	MPC · JPL
787375	2016 EZ_{68}	—	December 15, 2001	Apache Point	SDSS	·	1.4 km	MPC · JPL
787376	2016 EL_{74}	—	November 5, 2005	Kitt Peak	Spacewatch	AGN	850 m	MPC · JPL
787377	2016 ED_{75}	—	February 25, 2011	Mount Lemmon	Mount Lemmon Survey	·	1.3 km	MPC · JPL
787378	2016 EZ_{75}	—	January 14, 2011	Mount Lemmon	Mount Lemmon Survey	·	1.3 km	MPC · JPL
787379	2016 EO_{76}	—	February 6, 2016	Haleakala	Pan-STARRS 1	·	1.5 km	MPC · JPL
787380	2016 ET_{76}	—	November 1, 2014	Mount Lemmon	Mount Lemmon Survey	·	1.2 km	MPC · JPL
787381	2016 EB_{78}	—	October 10, 2008	Kitt Peak	Spacewatch	·	1.9 km	MPC · JPL
787382	2016 EG_{80}	—	January 8, 2007	Mount Lemmon	Mount Lemmon Survey	·	1.0 km	MPC · JPL
787383	2016 EL_{82}	—	April 23, 2007	Kitt Peak	Spacewatch	·	1.5 km	MPC · JPL
787384	2016 EN_{82}	—	February 29, 2016	Apache Point	SDSS Collaboration	·	1.2 km	MPC · JPL
787385	2016 EE_{83}	—	March 28, 2011	Mount Lemmon	Mount Lemmon Survey	·	2.1 km	MPC · JPL
787386	2016 EC_{84}	—	February 20, 2016	Haleakala	Pan-STARRS 1	·	1.3 km	MPC · JPL
787387	2016 EF_{88}	—	February 10, 2007	Mount Lemmon	Mount Lemmon Survey	·	1.3 km	MPC · JPL
787388	2016 EL_{91}	—	November 24, 2014	Haleakala	Pan-STARRS 1	GEF	820 m	MPC · JPL
787389	2016 ET_{92}	—	March 7, 2016	Haleakala	Pan-STARRS 1	·	2.1 km	MPC · JPL
787390	2016 EL_{93}	—	April 10, 2005	Mount Lemmon	Mount Lemmon Survey	·	2.2 km	MPC · JPL
787391	2016 EV_{96}	—	January 2, 2011	Mount Lemmon	Mount Lemmon Survey	DOR	1.5 km	MPC · JPL
787392	2016 EA_{97}	—	March 7, 2016	Haleakala	Pan-STARRS 1	·	1.5 km	MPC · JPL
787393	2016 EQ_{98}	—	February 3, 2016	Haleakala	Pan-STARRS 1	·	970 m	MPC · JPL
787394	2016 EM_{100}	—	February 12, 2016	Mount Lemmon	Mount Lemmon Survey	·	1.1 km	MPC · JPL
787395	2016 EC_{103}	—	April 8, 2008	Mount Lemmon	Mount Lemmon Survey	·	890 m	MPC · JPL
787396	2016 EV_{105}	—	March 7, 2016	Haleakala	Pan-STARRS 1	·	1.3 km	MPC · JPL
787397	2016 EP_{106}	—	May 3, 2008	Mount Lemmon	Mount Lemmon Survey	·	1.5 km	MPC · JPL
787398	2016 EG_{107}	—	March 7, 2016	Haleakala	Pan-STARRS 1	·	1.5 km	MPC · JPL
787399	2016 EK_{111}	—	March 11, 2002	Kitt Peak	Spacewatch	DOR	1.8 km	MPC · JPL
787400	2016 EL_{111}	—	January 8, 2010	Mount Lemmon	Mount Lemmon Survey	·	2.0 km	MPC · JPL

== 787401–787500 ==
back to top

Designation			Discovery			Properties		Ref
Permanent	Provisional	Named after	Date	Site	Discoverer(s)	Category	Diam.	Ref
787401	2016 EQ_{112}	—	August 28, 2013	Mount Lemmon	Mount Lemmon Survey	·	1.5 km	MPC · JPL
787402	2016 EZ_{114}	—	February 5, 2016	Haleakala	Pan-STARRS 1	AGN	800 m	MPC · JPL
787403	2016 EE_{119}	—	January 13, 2011	Mount Lemmon	Mount Lemmon Survey	·	1.4 km	MPC · JPL
787404	2016 EW_{120}	—	April 27, 2012	Haleakala	Pan-STARRS 1	·	1.1 km	MPC · JPL
787405	2016 EL_{122}	—	February 10, 2016	Haleakala	Pan-STARRS 1	·	1.9 km	MPC · JPL
787406	2016 EA_{127}	—	March 27, 2012	Kitt Peak	Spacewatch	·	920 m	MPC · JPL
787407	2016 EC_{129}	—	March 10, 2016	Haleakala	Pan-STARRS 1	AGN	700 m	MPC · JPL
787408	2016 EA_{132}	—	March 10, 2016	Haleakala	Pan-STARRS 1	·	1.6 km	MPC · JPL
787409	2016 EO_{134}	—	March 12, 2010	Mount Lemmon	Mount Lemmon Survey	·	2.7 km	MPC · JPL
787410	2016 EP_{135}	—	September 19, 2009	Mount Lemmon	Mount Lemmon Survey	·	1.7 km	MPC · JPL
787411	2016 EQ_{138}	—	March 10, 2016	Mount Lemmon	Mount Lemmon Survey	·	1.7 km	MPC · JPL
787412	2016 EG_{140}	—	February 27, 2007	Kitt Peak	Spacewatch	·	1.5 km	MPC · JPL
787413	2016 EZ_{145}	—	October 28, 2005	Kitt Peak	Spacewatch	·	1.3 km	MPC · JPL
787414	2016 EG_{146}	—	January 15, 2016	Haleakala	Pan-STARRS 1	·	1.5 km	MPC · JPL
787415	2016 EP_{146}	—	May 4, 2006	Kitt Peak	Spacewatch	·	1.5 km	MPC · JPL
787416	2016 EA_{159}	—	March 10, 2016	Mount Lemmon	Mount Lemmon Survey	·	1.3 km	MPC · JPL
787417	2016 EM_{160}	—	September 2, 2013	Mount Lemmon	Mount Lemmon Survey	KOR	950 m	MPC · JPL
787418	2016 EY_{161}	—	January 28, 2007	Mount Lemmon	Mount Lemmon Survey	·	1.6 km	MPC · JPL
787419	2016 EH_{165}	—	February 25, 2011	Mount Lemmon	Mount Lemmon Survey	KOR	980 m	MPC · JPL
787420	2016 EC_{168}	—	March 11, 2016	Haleakala	Pan-STARRS 1	DOR	1.8 km	MPC · JPL
787421	2016 EH_{170}	—	March 10, 2016	Haleakala	Pan-STARRS 1	·	1.3 km	MPC · JPL
787422	2016 EP_{173}	—	October 11, 2009	Mount Lemmon	Mount Lemmon Survey	(12739)	1.4 km	MPC · JPL
787423	2016 EL_{175}	—	March 12, 2016	Haleakala	Pan-STARRS 1	·	1.2 km	MPC · JPL
787424	2016 ET_{178}	—	March 12, 2016	Haleakala	Pan-STARRS 1	GEF	860 m	MPC · JPL
787425	2016 EU_{182}	—	April 24, 2012	Haleakala	Pan-STARRS 1	·	1.4 km	MPC · JPL
787426	2016 EK_{183}	—	November 9, 2013	Haleakala	Pan-STARRS 1	·	1.8 km	MPC · JPL
787427	2016 EL_{184}	—	March 12, 2016	Haleakala	Pan-STARRS 1	·	2.2 km	MPC · JPL
787428	2016 EY_{184}	—	December 2, 2005	Kitt Peak	Wasserman, L. H., Millis, R. L.	KOR	1.1 km	MPC · JPL
787429	2016 EW_{186}	—	November 29, 2014	Mount Lemmon	Mount Lemmon Survey	·	1.4 km	MPC · JPL
787430	2016 ED_{188}	—	January 4, 2016	Haleakala	Pan-STARRS 1	·	1.5 km	MPC · JPL
787431	2016 EO_{188}	—	March 13, 2016	Haleakala	Pan-STARRS 1	·	2.5 km	MPC · JPL
787432	2016 ES_{189}	—	August 1, 2009	Kitt Peak	Spacewatch	·	1.1 km	MPC · JPL
787433	2016 EX_{190}	—	September 3, 2005	Mauna Kea	Veillet, C.	·	1.1 km	MPC · JPL
787434	2016 ET_{198}	—	May 8, 2011	Mount Lemmon	Mount Lemmon Survey	·	2.0 km	MPC · JPL
787435	2016 EV_{200}	—	February 5, 2016	Haleakala	Pan-STARRS 1	VER	2.0 km	MPC · JPL
787436	2016 EE_{202}	—	September 29, 2005	Mount Lemmon	Mount Lemmon Survey	·	1.3 km	MPC · JPL
787437	2016 EG_{203}	—	February 15, 2016	Haleakala	Pan-STARRS 1	·	1.2 km	MPC · JPL
787438	2016 EN_{208}	—	April 4, 2005	Kitt Peak	Spacewatch	·	2.1 km	MPC · JPL
787439	2016 EZ_{208}	—	March 4, 2016	Haleakala	Pan-STARRS 1	BRA	1.2 km	MPC · JPL
787440	2016 EX_{215}	—	March 7, 2016	Haleakala	Pan-STARRS 1	·	1.6 km	MPC · JPL
787441	2016 EA_{217}	—	March 1, 2016	Mount Lemmon	Mount Lemmon Survey	·	1.2 km	MPC · JPL
787442	2016 EQ_{219}	—	February 17, 2007	Mount Lemmon	Mount Lemmon Survey	·	1.0 km	MPC · JPL
787443	2016 EV_{219}	—	April 25, 2007	Kitt Peak	Spacewatch	·	1.5 km	MPC · JPL
787444	2016 EQ_{221}	—	June 5, 2011	Mount Lemmon	Mount Lemmon Survey	·	1.8 km	MPC · JPL
787445	2016 ES_{224}	—	March 7, 2016	Haleakala	Pan-STARRS 1	·	2.3 km	MPC · JPL
787446	2016 ET_{225}	—	March 4, 2016	Haleakala	Pan-STARRS 1	VER	2.1 km	MPC · JPL
787447	2016 EE_{226}	—	March 10, 2016	Haleakala	Pan-STARRS 1	·	1.5 km	MPC · JPL
787448	2016 ES_{226}	—	March 4, 2016	Haleakala	Pan-STARRS 1	·	1.4 km	MPC · JPL
787449	2016 EX_{226}	—	March 28, 2012	Kitt Peak	Spacewatch	·	870 m	MPC · JPL
787450	2016 EM_{227}	—	March 13, 2016	Haleakala	Pan-STARRS 1	·	1.4 km	MPC · JPL
787451	2016 EM_{228}	—	March 5, 2016	Haleakala	Pan-STARRS 1	·	1.4 km	MPC · JPL
787452	2016 EZ_{228}	—	March 10, 2016	Haleakala	Pan-STARRS 1	·	1.6 km	MPC · JPL
787453	2016 EF_{229}	—	May 22, 2012	Mount Lemmon	Mount Lemmon Survey	·	1.3 km	MPC · JPL
787454	2016 EV_{229}	—	April 6, 2011	Mount Lemmon	Mount Lemmon Survey	·	2.0 km	MPC · JPL
787455	2016 EE_{231}	—	March 3, 2016	Mount Lemmon	Mount Lemmon Survey	EOS	1.3 km	MPC · JPL
787456	2016 EE_{234}	—	November 1, 2013	Mount Lemmon	Mount Lemmon Survey	HYG	2.0 km	MPC · JPL
787457	2016 ED_{237}	—	March 6, 2016	Haleakala	Pan-STARRS 1	·	1.6 km	MPC · JPL
787458	2016 EF_{237}	—	October 26, 2013	Mount Lemmon	Mount Lemmon Survey	·	2.1 km	MPC · JPL
787459	2016 EG_{237}	—	January 7, 2006	Kitt Peak	Spacewatch	·	1.3 km	MPC · JPL
787460	2016 EN_{240}	—	March 10, 2016	Mount Lemmon	Mount Lemmon Survey	KOR	980 m	MPC · JPL
787461	2016 EQ_{240}	—	February 11, 2016	Haleakala	Pan-STARRS 1	·	2.5 km	MPC · JPL
787462	2016 EX_{240}	—	March 10, 2016	Haleakala	Pan-STARRS 1	·	1.3 km	MPC · JPL
787463	2016 EN_{242}	—	March 10, 2016	Haleakala	Pan-STARRS 1	·	1.3 km	MPC · JPL
787464	2016 EN_{243}	—	March 10, 2016	Haleakala	Pan-STARRS 1	·	2.2 km	MPC · JPL
787465	2016 EA_{244}	—	March 10, 2016	Haleakala	Pan-STARRS 1	THM	1.8 km	MPC · JPL
787466	2016 EB_{245}	—	March 11, 2016	Haleakala	Pan-STARRS 1	·	1.3 km	MPC · JPL
787467	2016 EN_{246}	—	September 3, 2013	Mount Lemmon	Mount Lemmon Survey	KOR	1.0 km	MPC · JPL
787468	2016 EP_{246}	—	March 13, 2016	Haleakala	Pan-STARRS 1	EOS	1.1 km	MPC · JPL
787469	2016 EQ_{246}	—	March 13, 2016	Haleakala	Pan-STARRS 1	KOR	960 m	MPC · JPL
787470	2016 EE_{247}	—	September 3, 2013	Haleakala	Pan-STARRS 1	·	1.2 km	MPC · JPL
787471	2016 EH_{247}	—	March 2, 2011	Mount Lemmon	Mount Lemmon Survey	AGN	850 m	MPC · JPL
787472	2016 EQ_{249}	—	October 30, 2013	Haleakala	Pan-STARRS 1	ADE	1.7 km	MPC · JPL
787473	2016 EY_{249}	—	March 4, 2016	Haleakala	Pan-STARRS 1	·	1.2 km	MPC · JPL
787474	2016 EK_{251}	—	March 5, 2016	Haleakala	Pan-STARRS 1	HNS	910 m	MPC · JPL
787475	2016 EF_{256}	—	March 13, 2016	Haleakala	Pan-STARRS 1	EOS	1.3 km	MPC · JPL
787476	2016 EQ_{257}	—	March 4, 2016	Haleakala	Pan-STARRS 1	·	1.9 km	MPC · JPL
787477	2016 EU_{263}	—	March 5, 2016	Haleakala	Pan-STARRS 1	·	2.4 km	MPC · JPL
787478	2016 ED_{264}	—	March 12, 2016	Haleakala	Pan-STARRS 1	·	2.2 km	MPC · JPL
787479	2016 EY_{264}	—	March 10, 2016	Haleakala	Pan-STARRS 1	·	1.7 km	MPC · JPL
787480	2016 EH_{265}	—	March 5, 2016	Haleakala	Pan-STARRS 1	·	1.7 km	MPC · JPL
787481	2016 ET_{265}	—	March 4, 2016	Haleakala	Pan-STARRS 1	·	1.6 km	MPC · JPL
787482	2016 ED_{266}	—	March 12, 2016	Haleakala	Pan-STARRS 1	·	1.5 km	MPC · JPL
787483	2016 EF_{266}	—	March 13, 2016	Haleakala	Pan-STARRS 1	·	1.3 km	MPC · JPL
787484	2016 EK_{266}	—	March 15, 2016	Mount Lemmon	Mount Lemmon Survey	·	1.3 km	MPC · JPL
787485	2016 EO_{266}	—	March 4, 2016	Haleakala	Pan-STARRS 1	·	1.0 km	MPC · JPL
787486	2016 ET_{268}	—	March 7, 2016	Haleakala	Pan-STARRS 1	·	1.5 km	MPC · JPL
787487	2016 EG_{271}	—	March 3, 2016	Mount Lemmon	Mount Lemmon Survey	·	940 m	MPC · JPL
787488	2016 ER_{275}	—	March 12, 2016	Mount Lemmon	Mount Lemmon Survey	·	2.3 km	MPC · JPL
787489	2016 EY_{275}	—	March 4, 2016	Haleakala	Pan-STARRS 1	LUT	2.8 km	MPC · JPL
787490	2016 EH_{276}	—	August 12, 2013	Haleakala	Pan-STARRS 1	·	1.1 km	MPC · JPL
787491	2016 EK_{276}	—	March 10, 2016	Haleakala	Pan-STARRS 1	·	1.0 km	MPC · JPL
787492	2016 EB_{277}	—	March 10, 2016	Mount Lemmon	Mount Lemmon Survey	·	1.6 km	MPC · JPL
787493	2016 EH_{281}	—	March 12, 2016	Haleakala	Pan-STARRS 1	·	2.0 km	MPC · JPL
787494	2016 EP_{281}	—	March 12, 2016	Haleakala	Pan-STARRS 1	·	1.6 km	MPC · JPL
787495	2016 ET_{281}	—	March 6, 2016	Haleakala	Pan-STARRS 1	KOR	810 m	MPC · JPL
787496	2016 EP_{282}	—	March 13, 2016	Haleakala	Pan-STARRS 1	AGN	820 m	MPC · JPL
787497	2016 EN_{283}	—	March 10, 2016	Haleakala	Pan-STARRS 1	·	1.2 km	MPC · JPL
787498	2016 EQ_{287}	—	March 15, 2016	Mount Lemmon	Mount Lemmon Survey	·	2.0 km	MPC · JPL
787499	2016 EH_{289}	—	March 10, 2016	Haleakala	Pan-STARRS 1	·	1.2 km	MPC · JPL
787500	2016 EX_{289}	—	March 7, 2016	Haleakala	Pan-STARRS 1	·	1.7 km	MPC · JPL

== 787501–787600 ==
back to top

Designation			Discovery			Properties		Ref
Permanent	Provisional	Named after	Date	Site	Discoverer(s)	Category	Diam.	Ref
787501	2016 EN_{292}	—	March 10, 2016	Haleakala	Pan-STARRS 1	·	1.4 km	MPC · JPL
787502	2016 EC_{293}	—	March 13, 2016	Haleakala	Pan-STARRS 1	·	1.7 km	MPC · JPL
787503	2016 EU_{293}	—	March 14, 2016	Mount Lemmon	Mount Lemmon Survey	EOS	1.3 km	MPC · JPL
787504	2016 EE_{294}	—	March 7, 2016	Haleakala	Pan-STARRS 1	·	1.6 km	MPC · JPL
787505	2016 EZ_{294}	—	March 12, 2016	Haleakala	Pan-STARRS 1	·	2.0 km	MPC · JPL
787506	2016 EB_{295}	—	March 10, 2016	Haleakala	Pan-STARRS 1	·	1.4 km	MPC · JPL
787507	2016 ER_{295}	—	March 14, 2016	Mount Lemmon	Mount Lemmon Survey	HOF	1.7 km	MPC · JPL
787508	2016 EF_{296}	—	March 14, 2016	Mount Lemmon	Mount Lemmon Survey	·	1.4 km	MPC · JPL
787509	2016 EL_{296}	—	March 11, 2016	Haleakala	Pan-STARRS 1	·	1.3 km	MPC · JPL
787510	2016 EM_{296}	—	March 7, 2016	Haleakala	Pan-STARRS 1	·	1.4 km	MPC · JPL
787511	2016 EN_{296}	—	January 13, 2015	Haleakala	Pan-STARRS 1	·	1.8 km	MPC · JPL
787512	2016 EP_{296}	—	March 10, 2016	Haleakala	Pan-STARRS 1	·	1.2 km	MPC · JPL
787513	2016 ES_{296}	—	March 14, 2016	Mount Lemmon	Mount Lemmon Survey	·	1.7 km	MPC · JPL
787514	2016 EX_{296}	—	March 13, 2016	Haleakala	Pan-STARRS 1	·	1.4 km	MPC · JPL
787515	2016 ES_{299}	—	March 15, 2016	Mount Lemmon	Mount Lemmon Survey	PAD	1.2 km	MPC · JPL
787516	2016 EA_{300}	—	March 1, 2016	Mount Lemmon	Mount Lemmon Survey	AGN	800 m	MPC · JPL
787517	2016 ES_{300}	—	March 11, 2016	Mount Lemmon	Mount Lemmon Survey	·	1.5 km	MPC · JPL
787518	2016 ES_{301}	—	March 10, 2016	Haleakala	Pan-STARRS 1	EOS	1.3 km	MPC · JPL
787519	2016 EY_{302}	—	March 4, 2016	Haleakala	Pan-STARRS 1	HOF	1.9 km	MPC · JPL
787520	2016 ED_{303}	—	March 7, 2016	Haleakala	Pan-STARRS 1	·	2.0 km	MPC · JPL
787521	2016 EN_{304}	—	March 10, 2016	Haleakala	Pan-STARRS 1	·	1.5 km	MPC · JPL
787522	2016 EO_{304}	—	February 4, 2006	Kitt Peak	Spacewatch	·	1.4 km	MPC · JPL
787523	2016 EO_{310}	—	November 27, 2014	Haleakala	Pan-STARRS 1	·	1.7 km	MPC · JPL
787524	2016 ET_{310}	—	March 14, 2016	Mount Lemmon	Mount Lemmon Survey	TEL	970 m	MPC · JPL
787525	2016 ER_{312}	—	August 12, 2013	Haleakala	Pan-STARRS 1	·	820 m	MPC · JPL
787526	2016 EY_{312}	—	March 3, 2016	Haleakala	Pan-STARRS 1	·	2.4 km	MPC · JPL
787527	2016 ES_{314}	—	March 7, 2016	Haleakala	Pan-STARRS 1	·	1.3 km	MPC · JPL
787528	2016 EW_{315}	—	March 15, 2016	Mount Lemmon	Mount Lemmon Survey	VER	2.1 km	MPC · JPL
787529	2016 EM_{316}	—	March 14, 2016	Mount Lemmon	Mount Lemmon Survey	·	2.2 km	MPC · JPL
787530	2016 ED_{317}	—	March 3, 2016	Haleakala	Pan-STARRS 1	·	1.8 km	MPC · JPL
787531	2016 EP_{317}	—	March 12, 2016	Haleakala	Pan-STARRS 1	·	1.6 km	MPC · JPL
787532	2016 ED_{319}	—	March 12, 2016	Haleakala	Pan-STARRS 1	·	1.8 km	MPC · JPL
787533	2016 EF_{319}	—	November 10, 2013	Mount Lemmon	Mount Lemmon Survey	·	2.2 km	MPC · JPL
787534	2016 EW_{319}	—	October 3, 2013	Mount Lemmon	Mount Lemmon Survey	·	1.9 km	MPC · JPL
787535	2016 EC_{320}	—	March 5, 2016	Haleakala	Pan-STARRS 1	·	2.5 km	MPC · JPL
787536	2016 EJ_{320}	—	March 4, 2016	Haleakala	Pan-STARRS 1	DOR	1.5 km	MPC · JPL
787537	2016 EK_{321}	—	March 13, 2016	Haleakala	Pan-STARRS 1	AGN	730 m	MPC · JPL
787538	2016 EN_{321}	—	March 13, 2016	Haleakala	Pan-STARRS 1	·	1.8 km	MPC · JPL
787539	2016 ED_{322}	—	March 10, 2016	Haleakala	Pan-STARRS 1	·	1.3 km	MPC · JPL
787540	2016 EB_{323}	—	March 10, 2016	Haleakala	Pan-STARRS 1	·	1.5 km	MPC · JPL
787541	2016 EA_{334}	—	March 12, 2016	Haleakala	Pan-STARRS 1	·	2.1 km	MPC · JPL
787542	2016 EC_{337}	—	March 10, 2016	Mount Lemmon	Mount Lemmon Survey	KOR	1.3 km	MPC · JPL
787543	2016 EK_{337}	—	January 5, 2006	Kitt Peak	Spacewatch	·	1.3 km	MPC · JPL
787544	2016 EU_{341}	—	March 10, 2016	Haleakala	Pan-STARRS 1	HOF	1.5 km	MPC · JPL
787545	2016 EO_{344}	—	March 13, 2016	Haleakala	Pan-STARRS 1	·	830 m	MPC · JPL
787546	2016 EL_{345}	—	October 25, 2014	Mount Lemmon	Mount Lemmon Survey	MAR	700 m	MPC · JPL
787547	2016 EW_{345}	—	March 12, 2016	Haleakala	Pan-STARRS 1	·	1.6 km	MPC · JPL
787548	2016 EW_{347}	—	March 11, 2016	Mount Lemmon	Mount Lemmon Survey	·	1.3 km	MPC · JPL
787549	2016 ER_{352}	—	March 4, 2016	Haleakala	Pan-STARRS 1	·	1.2 km	MPC · JPL
787550	2016 ES_{353}	—	January 26, 2015	Haleakala	Pan-STARRS 1	·	2.2 km	MPC · JPL
787551	2016 EH_{355}	—	March 7, 2016	Haleakala	Pan-STARRS 1	HOF	1.8 km	MPC · JPL
787552	2016 EP_{355}	—	November 20, 2014	Haleakala	Pan-STARRS 1	·	1.2 km	MPC · JPL
787553	2016 EY_{355}	—	March 6, 2016	Haleakala	Pan-STARRS 1	·	1.3 km	MPC · JPL
787554	2016 EC_{356}	—	February 27, 2016	Mount Lemmon	Mount Lemmon Survey	·	1.2 km	MPC · JPL
787555	2016 EQ_{357}	—	March 1, 2016	Mount Lemmon	Mount Lemmon Survey	HOF	1.7 km	MPC · JPL
787556	2016 ER_{357}	—	September 26, 2009	Kitt Peak	Spacewatch	·	1.2 km	MPC · JPL
787557	2016 EL_{358}	—	October 25, 2014	Mount Lemmon	Mount Lemmon Survey	·	840 m	MPC · JPL
787558	2016 EP_{361}	—	March 13, 2016	Haleakala	Pan-STARRS 1	·	1.4 km	MPC · JPL
787559	2016 EM_{367}	—	March 11, 2016	Mount Lemmon	Mount Lemmon Survey	·	1.8 km	MPC · JPL
787560	2016 EO_{376}	—	March 12, 2016	Haleakala	Pan-STARRS 1	·	2.9 km	MPC · JPL
787561	2016 EF_{392}	—	July 16, 2013	Haleakala	Pan-STARRS 1	·	1.2 km	MPC · JPL
787562	2016 EH_{396}	—	March 13, 2016	Haleakala	Pan-STARRS 1	·	2.6 km	MPC · JPL
787563	2016 EZ_{396}	—	January 24, 2015	Mount Lemmon	Mount Lemmon Survey	·	2.2 km	MPC · JPL
787564	2016 FH_{2}	—	January 18, 2016	Haleakala	Pan-STARRS 1	·	2.4 km	MPC · JPL
787565	2016 FZ_{4}	—	February 10, 2016	Haleakala	Pan-STARRS 1	·	2.1 km	MPC · JPL
787566	2016 FF_{5}	—	March 14, 2011	Mount Lemmon	Mount Lemmon Survey	·	1.4 km	MPC · JPL
787567	2016 FH_{5}	—	November 18, 2009	Kitt Peak	Spacewatch	KOR	1.2 km	MPC · JPL
787568	2016 FR_{7}	—	March 28, 2016	Mount Lemmon	Mount Lemmon Survey	·	1.4 km	MPC · JPL
787569	2016 FF_{9}	—	October 17, 2010	Mount Lemmon	Mount Lemmon Survey	·	800 m	MPC · JPL
787570	2016 FR_{15}	—	March 13, 2007	Mount Lemmon	Mount Lemmon Survey	·	1.3 km	MPC · JPL
787571	2016 FQ_{16}	—	March 29, 2016	Haleakala	Pan-STARRS 1	GEF	840 m	MPC · JPL
787572	2016 FS_{17}	—	February 21, 2007	Mount Lemmon	Mount Lemmon Survey	·	1.2 km	MPC · JPL
787573	2016 FT_{18}	—	January 16, 2007	Mount Lemmon	Mount Lemmon Survey	·	1.5 km	MPC · JPL
787574	2016 FY_{18}	—	May 20, 2012	Mount Lemmon	Mount Lemmon Survey	·	1.1 km	MPC · JPL
787575	2016 FS_{20}	—	March 10, 2016	Haleakala	Pan-STARRS 1	EOS	1.4 km	MPC · JPL
787576	2016 FO_{21}	—	March 30, 2016	Haleakala	Pan-STARRS 1	·	1.6 km	MPC · JPL
787577	2016 FW_{21}	—	April 26, 2007	Mount Lemmon	Mount Lemmon Survey	·	1.7 km	MPC · JPL
787578	2016 FQ_{23}	—	March 10, 2005	Mount Lemmon	Mount Lemmon Survey	·	1.7 km	MPC · JPL
787579	2016 FT_{23}	—	March 10, 2016	Haleakala	Pan-STARRS 1	·	1.4 km	MPC · JPL
787580	2016 FZ_{23}	—	March 10, 2016	Haleakala	Pan-STARRS 1	·	1.4 km	MPC · JPL
787581	2016 FM_{25}	—	December 29, 2014	Haleakala	Pan-STARRS 1	HYG	1.9 km	MPC · JPL
787582	2016 FF_{31}	—	February 18, 2005	La Silla	A. Boattini, H. Scholl	·	1.9 km	MPC · JPL
787583	2016 FH_{31}	—	September 9, 2013	Haleakala	Pan-STARRS 1	·	1.1 km	MPC · JPL
787584	2016 FF_{32}	—	October 30, 2014	Haleakala	Pan-STARRS 1	·	1.6 km	MPC · JPL
787585	2016 FO_{32}	—	October 17, 2009	Mount Lemmon	Mount Lemmon Survey	·	1.1 km	MPC · JPL
787586	2016 FD_{33}	—	December 9, 2010	Mount Lemmon	Mount Lemmon Survey	·	1.2 km	MPC · JPL
787587	2016 FE_{37}	—	August 25, 2012	Catalina	CSS	·	1.8 km	MPC · JPL
787588	2016 FU_{42}	—	March 30, 2012	Mount Lemmon	Mount Lemmon Survey	·	1.5 km	MPC · JPL
787589	2016 FA_{45}	—	April 22, 2011	Kitt Peak	Spacewatch	·	1.8 km	MPC · JPL
787590	2016 FY_{49}	—	January 8, 2016	Haleakala	Pan-STARRS 1	·	1.5 km	MPC · JPL
787591	2016 FF_{51}	—	March 4, 2016	Haleakala	Pan-STARRS 1	·	1.8 km	MPC · JPL
787592	2016 FD_{52}	—	January 7, 2006	Mount Lemmon	Mount Lemmon Survey	·	1.3 km	MPC · JPL
787593	2016 FT_{53}	—	March 4, 2016	Haleakala	Pan-STARRS 1	EUN	860 m	MPC · JPL
787594	2016 FX_{57}	—	February 6, 2011	Mount Lemmon	Mount Lemmon Survey	·	1.4 km	MPC · JPL
787595	2016 FK_{64}	—	March 28, 2016	Mount Lemmon	Mount Lemmon Survey	·	1.7 km	MPC · JPL
787596	2016 FZ_{68}	—	March 18, 2016	Mount Lemmon	Mount Lemmon Survey	TIN	750 m	MPC · JPL
787597	2016 FC_{71}	—	March 28, 2016	Mount Lemmon	Mount Lemmon Survey	EOS	1.2 km	MPC · JPL
787598	2016 FJ_{71}	—	March 31, 2016	Haleakala	Pan-STARRS 1	·	1.6 km	MPC · JPL
787599	2016 FL_{71}	—	March 18, 2016	Haleakala	Pan-STARRS 1	·	1.8 km	MPC · JPL
787600	2016 FP_{71}	—	March 31, 2016	Haleakala	Pan-STARRS 1	·	1.3 km	MPC · JPL

== 787601–787700 ==
back to top

Designation			Discovery			Properties		Ref
Permanent	Provisional	Named after	Date	Site	Discoverer(s)	Category	Diam.	Ref
787601	2016 FT_{71}	—	March 16, 2016	Haleakala	Pan-STARRS 1	EOS	1.4 km	MPC · JPL
787602	2016 FN_{73}	—	March 18, 2016	Mount Lemmon	Mount Lemmon Survey	·	1.7 km	MPC · JPL
787603	2016 FF_{78}	—	March 31, 2016	Mount Lemmon	Mount Lemmon Survey	·	1.4 km	MPC · JPL
787604	2016 FG_{78}	—	March 28, 2016	Mount Lemmon	Mount Lemmon Survey	·	1.4 km	MPC · JPL
787605	2016 FA_{79}	—	March 30, 2016	Haleakala	Pan-STARRS 1	ADE	1.5 km	MPC · JPL
787606	2016 FN_{81}	—	March 31, 2016	Mount Lemmon	Mount Lemmon Survey	·	2.0 km	MPC · JPL
787607	2016 FR_{82}	—	March 31, 2016	Haleakala	Pan-STARRS 1	·	1.4 km	MPC · JPL
787608	2016 FZ_{82}	—	March 28, 2016	Cerro Paranal	Gaia Ground Based Optical Tracking	·	1.4 km	MPC · JPL
787609	2016 FW_{83}	—	March 16, 2016	Haleakala	Pan-STARRS 1	·	2.9 km	MPC · JPL
787610	2016 FA_{84}	—	March 28, 2016	Cerro Tololo	DECam	·	1.3 km	MPC · JPL
787611	2016 FY_{84}	—	January 16, 2015	Haleakala	Pan-STARRS 1	·	1.7 km	MPC · JPL
787612	2016 FM_{91}	—	March 28, 2016	Cerro Tololo	DECam	·	1.7 km	MPC · JPL
787613	2016 FP_{93}	—	March 28, 2016	Cerro Tololo	DECam	·	1.4 km	MPC · JPL
787614	2016 FX_{98}	—	February 5, 2011	Haleakala	Pan-STARRS 1	·	1.1 km	MPC · JPL
787615	2016 FG_{111}	—	December 11, 2014	Mount Lemmon	Mount Lemmon Survey	·	1.2 km	MPC · JPL
787616	2016 FQ_{112}	—	March 28, 2016	Cerro Tololo	DECam	·	1.9 km	MPC · JPL
787617	2016 FA_{120}	—	March 28, 2016	Cerro Tololo	DECam	·	1.5 km	MPC · JPL
787618	2016 FJ_{131}	—	March 31, 2016	Mount Lemmon	Mount Lemmon Survey	AGN	890 m	MPC · JPL
787619	2016 FG_{148}	—	March 28, 2016	Cerro Tololo	DECam	·	2.0 km	MPC · JPL
787620	2016 FF_{154}	—	March 29, 2016	Cerro Tololo-DECam	DECam	GEF	1.1 km	MPC · JPL
787621	2016 FK_{156}	—	March 29, 2016	Cerro Tololo-DECam	DECam	·	1.5 km	MPC · JPL
787622	2016 FF_{157}	—	March 28, 2016	Cerro Tololo	DECam	EOS	1.3 km	MPC · JPL
787623	2016 FS_{167}	—	March 31, 2016	Cerro Tololo	DECam	VER	2.0 km	MPC · JPL
787624	2016 FM_{169}	—	March 30, 2016	Cerro Tololo	DECam	TIR	2.1 km	MPC · JPL
787625	2016 FP_{169}	—	March 16, 2016	Mount Lemmon	Mount Lemmon Survey	EOS	1.3 km	MPC · JPL
787626	2016 FR_{171}	—	March 17, 2016	Mount Lemmon	Mount Lemmon Survey	·	1.3 km	MPC · JPL
787627	2016 FU_{173}	—	March 29, 2016	Cerro Tololo-DECam	DECam	·	2.5 km	MPC · JPL
787628	2016 FT_{179}	—	December 5, 2007	Kitt Peak	Spacewatch	·	1.9 km	MPC · JPL
787629	2016 FG_{180}	—	March 31, 2016	Cerro Tololo	DECam	·	1.3 km	MPC · JPL
787630	2016 FN_{180}	—	March 27, 2016	Mount Lemmon	Mount Lemmon Survey	·	1.9 km	MPC · JPL
787631	2016 FS_{190}	—	March 30, 2016	Haleakala	Pan-STARRS 1	·	1.9 km	MPC · JPL
787632	2016 FU_{190}	—	March 29, 2016	Cerro Tololo-DECam	DECam	·	1.8 km	MPC · JPL
787633	2016 GQ_{1}	—	May 25, 2003	Kitt Peak	Spacewatch	JUN	770 m	MPC · JPL
787634	2016 GK_{4}	—	April 1, 2011	Kitt Peak	Spacewatch	·	1.8 km	MPC · JPL
787635	2016 GB_{7}	—	March 13, 2016	Haleakala	Pan-STARRS 1	·	1.9 km	MPC · JPL
787636	2016 GW_{7}	—	September 10, 2013	Haleakala	Pan-STARRS 1	·	1.6 km	MPC · JPL
787637	2016 GS_{8}	—	February 13, 2011	Mount Lemmon	Mount Lemmon Survey	·	1.2 km	MPC · JPL
787638	2016 GZ_{10}	—	September 6, 2008	Mount Lemmon	Mount Lemmon Survey	KOR	990 m	MPC · JPL
787639	2016 GT_{11}	—	December 26, 2014	Haleakala	Pan-STARRS 1	·	2.2 km	MPC · JPL
787640	2016 GO_{12}	—	April 19, 2007	Kitt Peak	Spacewatch	DOR	1.7 km	MPC · JPL
787641	2016 GV_{14}	—	November 29, 2014	Mount Lemmon	Mount Lemmon Survey	·	1.1 km	MPC · JPL
787642	2016 GD_{16}	—	September 6, 2008	Mount Lemmon	Mount Lemmon Survey	·	1.4 km	MPC · JPL
787643	2016 GQ_{16}	—	February 10, 2008	Mount Lemmon	Mount Lemmon Survey	3:2	3.3 km	MPC · JPL
787644	2016 GP_{21}	—	April 1, 2016	Haleakala	Pan-STARRS 1	·	2.0 km	MPC · JPL
787645	2016 GU_{21}	—	April 1, 2016	Haleakala	Pan-STARRS 1	·	1.7 km	MPC · JPL
787646	2016 GA_{22}	—	March 13, 2016	Haleakala	Pan-STARRS 1	·	1.7 km	MPC · JPL
787647	2016 GK_{22}	—	February 5, 2011	Haleakala	Pan-STARRS 1	HOF	1.7 km	MPC · JPL
787648	2016 GG_{27}	—	September 3, 2013	Haleakala	Pan-STARRS 1	·	1.2 km	MPC · JPL
787649	2016 GC_{29}	—	March 1, 2016	Haleakala	Pan-STARRS 1	·	1.3 km	MPC · JPL
787650	2016 GM_{31}	—	September 3, 2008	Kitt Peak	Spacewatch	KOR	990 m	MPC · JPL
787651	2016 GG_{33}	—	October 9, 2007	Mount Lemmon	Mount Lemmon Survey	·	2.2 km	MPC · JPL
787652	2016 GX_{34}	—	August 28, 2013	Mount Lemmon	Mount Lemmon Survey	·	1.6 km	MPC · JPL
787653	2016 GN_{36}	—	September 9, 2008	Mount Lemmon	Mount Lemmon Survey	·	1.8 km	MPC · JPL
787654	2016 GX_{36}	—	March 4, 2016	Haleakala	Pan-STARRS 1	·	1.7 km	MPC · JPL
787655	2016 GL_{38}	—	September 25, 2013	Mount Lemmon	Mount Lemmon Survey	·	1.3 km	MPC · JPL
787656	2016 GM_{38}	—	March 13, 2016	Haleakala	Pan-STARRS 1	·	1.3 km	MPC · JPL
787657	2016 GX_{38}	—	March 10, 2016	Haleakala	Pan-STARRS 1	·	1.5 km	MPC · JPL
787658	2016 GD_{39}	—	April 1, 2016	Haleakala	Pan-STARRS 1	·	1.3 km	MPC · JPL
787659	2016 GL_{43}	—	October 3, 2013	Kitt Peak	Spacewatch	KOR	1.2 km	MPC · JPL
787660	2016 GH_{44}	—	August 28, 2013	Mount Lemmon	Mount Lemmon Survey	HOF	1.6 km	MPC · JPL
787661	2016 GA_{46}	—	March 13, 2007	Kitt Peak	Spacewatch	·	1.6 km	MPC · JPL
787662	2016 GY_{46}	—	March 13, 2016	Haleakala	Pan-STARRS 1	(69559)	2.3 km	MPC · JPL
787663	2016 GN_{47}	—	February 25, 2011	Mount Lemmon	Mount Lemmon Survey	HOF	1.6 km	MPC · JPL
787664	2016 GP_{50}	—	April 1, 2016	Haleakala	Pan-STARRS 1	·	1.4 km	MPC · JPL
787665	2016 GU_{50}	—	April 1, 2016	Haleakala	Pan-STARRS 1	·	1.3 km	MPC · JPL
787666	2016 GY_{50}	—	March 10, 2016	Haleakala	Pan-STARRS 1	KOR	920 m	MPC · JPL
787667	2016 GB_{56}	—	March 29, 2011	Mount Lemmon	Mount Lemmon Survey	·	1.4 km	MPC · JPL
787668	2016 GF_{57}	—	January 18, 2016	Haleakala	Pan-STARRS 1	·	1.1 km	MPC · JPL
787669	2016 GD_{60}	—	April 20, 2012	Kitt Peak	Spacewatch	·	1.1 km	MPC · JPL
787670	2016 GG_{61}	—	March 4, 2016	Haleakala	Pan-STARRS 1	·	1.7 km	MPC · JPL
787671	2016 GU_{61}	—	March 10, 2016	Haleakala	Pan-STARRS 1	AST	1.1 km	MPC · JPL
787672	2016 GU_{63}	—	March 28, 2016	Mount Lemmon	Mount Lemmon Survey	·	1.3 km	MPC · JPL
787673	2016 GX_{63}	—	April 1, 2016	Haleakala	Pan-STARRS 1	HOF	1.4 km	MPC · JPL
787674	2016 GC_{64}	—	September 1, 2013	Haleakala	Pan-STARRS 1	KOR	950 m	MPC · JPL
787675	2016 GX_{65}	—	September 23, 2008	Kitt Peak	Spacewatch	·	1.5 km	MPC · JPL
787676	2016 GM_{71}	—	October 9, 2013	Mount Lemmon	Mount Lemmon Survey	AGN	820 m	MPC · JPL
787677	2016 GF_{73}	—	April 1, 2011	Kitt Peak	Spacewatch	EOS	1.4 km	MPC · JPL
787678	2016 GM_{79}	—	March 4, 2016	Haleakala	Pan-STARRS 1	·	2.2 km	MPC · JPL
787679	2016 GL_{81}	—	September 2, 2013	Mount Lemmon	Mount Lemmon Survey	KOR	1.0 km	MPC · JPL
787680	2016 GM_{83}	—	January 13, 2015	Haleakala	Pan-STARRS 1	KOR	920 m	MPC · JPL
787681	2016 GN_{84}	—	November 9, 2009	Mount Lemmon	Mount Lemmon Survey	·	1.4 km	MPC · JPL
787682	2016 GK_{89}	—	April 1, 2016	Haleakala	Pan-STARRS 1	HOF	1.9 km	MPC · JPL
787683	2016 GD_{90}	—	February 25, 2011	Mount Lemmon	Mount Lemmon Survey	DOR	1.2 km	MPC · JPL
787684	2016 GB_{91}	—	May 22, 2011	Mount Lemmon	Mount Lemmon Survey	·	1.9 km	MPC · JPL
787685	2016 GC_{92}	—	January 18, 2015	Haleakala	Pan-STARRS 1	·	1.1 km	MPC · JPL
787686	2016 GP_{94}	—	August 14, 2012	Haleakala	Pan-STARRS 1	·	2.3 km	MPC · JPL
787687	2016 GK_{98}	—	March 10, 2016	Haleakala	Pan-STARRS 1	·	2.2 km	MPC · JPL
787688	2016 GO_{99}	—	April 1, 2016	Haleakala	Pan-STARRS 1	WIT	600 m	MPC · JPL
787689	2016 GX_{100}	—	October 2, 2013	Mount Lemmon	Mount Lemmon Survey	HOF	1.8 km	MPC · JPL
787690	2016 GG_{103}	—	April 1, 2016	Haleakala	Pan-STARRS 1	·	2.0 km	MPC · JPL
787691	2016 GO_{103}	—	September 3, 2013	Mount Lemmon	Mount Lemmon Survey	·	1.4 km	MPC · JPL
787692	2016 GC_{104}	—	April 1, 2016	Haleakala	Pan-STARRS 1	THM	1.9 km	MPC · JPL
787693	2016 GJ_{104}	—	November 26, 2014	Haleakala	Pan-STARRS 1	·	890 m	MPC · JPL
787694	2016 GH_{105}	—	April 1, 2016	Haleakala	Pan-STARRS 1	·	1.9 km	MPC · JPL
787695	2016 GK_{105}	—	April 1, 2016	Haleakala	Pan-STARRS 1	·	1.2 km	MPC · JPL
787696	2016 GJ_{110}	—	October 3, 2013	Haleakala	Pan-STARRS 1	·	1.5 km	MPC · JPL
787697	2016 GZ_{114}	—	April 1, 2016	Haleakala	Pan-STARRS 1	·	1.6 km	MPC · JPL
787698	2016 GC_{118}	—	April 1, 2016	Haleakala	Pan-STARRS 1	·	1.9 km	MPC · JPL
787699	2016 GJ_{119}	—	April 1, 2016	Haleakala	Pan-STARRS 1	·	1.3 km	MPC · JPL
787700	2016 GT_{119}	—	December 26, 2014	Haleakala	Pan-STARRS 1	·	1.9 km	MPC · JPL

== 787701–787800 ==
back to top

Designation			Discovery			Properties		Ref
Permanent	Provisional	Named after	Date	Site	Discoverer(s)	Category	Diam.	Ref
787701	2016 GN_{121}	—	December 6, 2010	Mount Lemmon	Mount Lemmon Survey	·	1.1 km	MPC · JPL
787702	2016 GR_{127}	—	June 13, 2012	Kitt Peak	Spacewatch	·	1.2 km	MPC · JPL
787703	2016 GD_{130}	—	April 2, 2005	Mount Lemmon	Mount Lemmon Survey	TIR	2.2 km	MPC · JPL
787704	2016 GX_{130}	—	April 2, 2016	Mount Lemmon	Mount Lemmon Survey	·	2.0 km	MPC · JPL
787705	2016 GC_{131}	—	January 25, 2006	Kitt Peak	Spacewatch	·	1.4 km	MPC · JPL
787706	2016 GR_{132}	—	October 7, 2007	Mount Lemmon	Mount Lemmon Survey	VER	2.2 km	MPC · JPL
787707	2016 GR_{137}	—	March 13, 2016	Haleakala	Pan-STARRS 1	KOR	870 m	MPC · JPL
787708	2016 GF_{145}	—	February 5, 2011	Catalina	CSS	EUN	1.2 km	MPC · JPL
787709	2016 GD_{146}	—	October 3, 2013	Haleakala	Pan-STARRS 1	·	2.3 km	MPC · JPL
787710	2016 GT_{148}	—	March 11, 2005	Mount Lemmon	Mount Lemmon Survey	·	1.6 km	MPC · JPL
787711	2016 GR_{150}	—	December 21, 2014	Haleakala	Pan-STARRS 1	AGN	840 m	MPC · JPL
787712	2016 GU_{151}	—	February 10, 2016	Haleakala	Pan-STARRS 1	·	1.3 km	MPC · JPL
787713	2016 GR_{154}	—	March 8, 2016	Haleakala	Pan-STARRS 1	·	1.5 km	MPC · JPL
787714	2016 GH_{156}	—	October 3, 2013	Haleakala	Pan-STARRS 1	·	1.9 km	MPC · JPL
787715	2016 GA_{157}	—	February 10, 2011	Mount Lemmon	Mount Lemmon Survey	AGN	820 m	MPC · JPL
787716	2016 GC_{157}	—	April 15, 2008	Mount Lemmon	Mount Lemmon Survey	·	1.2 km	MPC · JPL
787717	2016 GQ_{159}	—	April 3, 2016	Haleakala	Pan-STARRS 1	·	1.8 km	MPC · JPL
787718	2016 GH_{160}	—	February 10, 2011	Mount Lemmon	Mount Lemmon Survey	·	1.2 km	MPC · JPL
787719	2016 GZ_{160}	—	April 3, 2016	Mount Lemmon	Mount Lemmon Survey	GEF	760 m	MPC · JPL
787720	2016 GX_{164}	—	March 13, 2016	Haleakala	Pan-STARRS 1	·	2.2 km	MPC · JPL
787721	2016 GA_{165}	—	January 14, 2015	Haleakala	Pan-STARRS 1	THM	1.7 km	MPC · JPL
787722	2016 GP_{169}	—	April 3, 2016	Haleakala	Pan-STARRS 1	·	1.6 km	MPC · JPL
787723	2016 GJ_{171}	—	October 25, 2013	Mount Lemmon	Mount Lemmon Survey	·	1.5 km	MPC · JPL
787724	2016 GE_{175}	—	February 26, 2011	Mount Lemmon	Mount Lemmon Survey	·	1.2 km	MPC · JPL
787725	2016 GH_{175}	—	December 5, 2005	Kitt Peak	Spacewatch	·	1.5 km	MPC · JPL
787726	2016 GB_{177}	—	April 3, 2016	Haleakala	Pan-STARRS 1	·	1.4 km	MPC · JPL
787727	2016 GG_{184}	—	February 11, 2011	Mount Lemmon	Mount Lemmon Survey	·	1 km	MPC · JPL
787728	2016 GU_{186}	—	April 3, 2016	Haleakala	Pan-STARRS 1	·	1.5 km	MPC · JPL
787729	2016 GN_{189}	—	December 26, 2014	Haleakala	Pan-STARRS 1	·	1.3 km	MPC · JPL
787730	2016 GN_{195}	—	March 30, 2016	Haleakala	Pan-STARRS 1	·	1.6 km	MPC · JPL
787731	2016 GW_{201}	—	April 4, 2016	Mount Lemmon	Mount Lemmon Survey	·	2.1 km	MPC · JPL
787732	2016 GJ_{203}	—	January 12, 2011	Mount Lemmon	Mount Lemmon Survey	·	1.3 km	MPC · JPL
787733	2016 GH_{204}	—	April 1, 2016	Haleakala	Pan-STARRS 1	·	1.4 km	MPC · JPL
787734	2016 GK_{204}	—	April 4, 2016	Mount Lemmon	Mount Lemmon Survey	·	1.9 km	MPC · JPL
787735	2016 GW_{209}	—	March 10, 2016	Haleakala	Pan-STARRS 1	EOS	1.4 km	MPC · JPL
787736	2016 GO_{211}	—	September 19, 2007	Kitt Peak	Spacewatch	·	2.2 km	MPC · JPL
787737	2016 GF_{214}	—	March 31, 2016	Mount Lemmon	Mount Lemmon Survey	·	1.3 km	MPC · JPL
787738	2016 GR_{214}	—	March 10, 2016	Haleakala	Pan-STARRS 1	·	1.7 km	MPC · JPL
787739	2016 GE_{215}	—	January 27, 2015	Haleakala	Pan-STARRS 1	·	2.3 km	MPC · JPL
787740	2016 GR_{224}	—	April 13, 2016	Mount Lemmon	Mount Lemmon Survey	·	2.3 km	MPC · JPL
787741	2016 GN_{230}	—	March 12, 2016	Haleakala	Pan-STARRS 1	·	1.8 km	MPC · JPL
787742	2016 GV_{230}	—	April 6, 2002	Kitt Peak	Spacewatch	·	1.2 km	MPC · JPL
787743	2016 GP_{233}	—	April 3, 2016	Haleakala	Pan-STARRS 1	·	1.2 km	MPC · JPL
787744	2016 GU_{239}	—	April 24, 2007	Mount Lemmon	Mount Lemmon Survey	·	940 m	MPC · JPL
787745	2016 GD_{244}	—	April 15, 2016	Haleakala	Pan-STARRS 1	·	1.7 km	MPC · JPL
787746	2016 GO_{254}	—	April 1, 2016	Mount Lemmon	Mount Lemmon Survey	·	2.3 km	MPC · JPL
787747	2016 GE_{256}	—	April 10, 2016	Haleakala	Pan-STARRS 1	TIR	2.9 km	MPC · JPL
787748	2016 GR_{257}	—	April 5, 2016	Haleakala	Pan-STARRS 1	·	1.2 km	MPC · JPL
787749	2016 GC_{258}	—	September 14, 2007	Mount Lemmon	Mount Lemmon Survey	·	2.1 km	MPC · JPL
787750	2016 GE_{258}	—	April 16, 2007	Mount Lemmon	Mount Lemmon Survey	·	1.4 km	MPC · JPL
787751	2016 GF_{259}	—	April 1, 2016	Haleakala	Pan-STARRS 1	·	1.6 km	MPC · JPL
787752	2016 GM_{259}	—	April 4, 2016	Haleakala	Pan-STARRS 1	·	1.4 km	MPC · JPL
787753	2016 GA_{260}	—	April 5, 2016	Haleakala	Pan-STARRS 1	·	750 m	MPC · JPL
787754	2016 GN_{260}	—	November 27, 2014	Haleakala	Pan-STARRS 1	·	1.4 km	MPC · JPL
787755	2016 GZ_{260}	—	January 14, 2011	Kitt Peak	Spacewatch	·	1.3 km	MPC · JPL
787756	2016 GE_{262}	—	April 2, 2016	Kitt Peak	Spacewatch	·	1.5 km	MPC · JPL
787757	2016 GE_{263}	—	April 3, 2016	Haleakala	Pan-STARRS 1	EOS	1.3 km	MPC · JPL
787758	2016 GA_{265}	—	April 5, 2016	Haleakala	Pan-STARRS 1	BRA	1.1 km	MPC · JPL
787759	2016 GH_{274}	—	April 1, 2016	Haleakala	Pan-STARRS 1	·	1.4 km	MPC · JPL
787760	2016 GH_{277}	—	April 10, 2016	Haleakala	Pan-STARRS 1	·	1.6 km	MPC · JPL
787761	2016 GS_{278}	—	April 3, 2016	Haleakala	Pan-STARRS 1	KOR	1.0 km	MPC · JPL
787762	2016 GU_{278}	—	April 9, 2016	Haleakala	Pan-STARRS 1	·	1.2 km	MPC · JPL
787763	2016 GX_{278}	—	April 2, 2016	Mount Lemmon	Mount Lemmon Survey	·	1.2 km	MPC · JPL
787764	2016 GD_{279}	—	April 2, 2016	Haleakala	Pan-STARRS 1	AGN	820 m	MPC · JPL
787765	2016 GF_{279}	—	April 2, 2016	Kitt Peak	Spacewatch	·	2.1 km	MPC · JPL
787766	2016 GG_{279}	—	April 15, 2016	Haleakala	Pan-STARRS 1	EOS	1.2 km	MPC · JPL
787767	2016 GH_{279}	—	April 1, 2016	Haleakala	Pan-STARRS 1	·	2.0 km	MPC · JPL
787768	2016 GO_{280}	—	April 5, 2016	Haleakala	Pan-STARRS 1	·	1.4 km	MPC · JPL
787769	2016 GQ_{281}	—	April 3, 2016	Haleakala	Pan-STARRS 1	·	2.2 km	MPC · JPL
787770	2016 GP_{283}	—	April 3, 2016	Haleakala	Pan-STARRS 1	·	1.4 km	MPC · JPL
787771	2016 GD_{285}	—	April 2, 2016	Haleakala	Pan-STARRS 1	·	2.1 km	MPC · JPL
787772	2016 GM_{285}	—	April 3, 2016	Haleakala	Pan-STARRS 1	·	1.7 km	MPC · JPL
787773	2016 GU_{285}	—	April 2, 2016	Haleakala	Pan-STARRS 1	L4	6.9 km	MPC · JPL
787774	2016 GX_{285}	—	April 1, 2016	Haleakala	Pan-STARRS 1	·	2.3 km	MPC · JPL
787775	2016 GR_{286}	—	April 10, 2016	Haleakala	Pan-STARRS 1	·	1.5 km	MPC · JPL
787776	2016 GJ_{288}	—	April 2, 2016	Haleakala	Pan-STARRS 1	EOS	1.3 km	MPC · JPL
787777	2016 GY_{290}	—	April 4, 2016	Haleakala	Pan-STARRS 1	·	1.4 km	MPC · JPL
787778	2016 GR_{296}	—	April 5, 2016	Haleakala	Pan-STARRS 1	EOS	1.3 km	MPC · JPL
787779	2016 GE_{297}	—	April 14, 2016	Mount Lemmon	Mount Lemmon Survey	·	2.0 km	MPC · JPL
787780	2016 GQ_{297}	—	April 1, 2016	Haleakala	Pan-STARRS 1	·	1.4 km	MPC · JPL
787781	2016 GT_{297}	—	April 10, 2016	Haleakala	Pan-STARRS 1	·	1.3 km	MPC · JPL
787782	2016 GD_{298}	—	April 2, 2016	Haleakala	Pan-STARRS 1	·	1.6 km	MPC · JPL
787783	2016 GT_{298}	—	April 1, 2016	Haleakala	Pan-STARRS 1	·	1.3 km	MPC · JPL
787784	2016 GU_{298}	—	April 3, 2016	Haleakala	Pan-STARRS 1	·	1.4 km	MPC · JPL
787785	2016 GJ_{299}	—	April 1, 2016	Haleakala	Pan-STARRS 1	EOS	1.3 km	MPC · JPL
787786	2016 GR_{299}	—	April 2, 2016	Mount Lemmon	Mount Lemmon Survey	·	1.2 km	MPC · JPL
787787	2016 GQ_{300}	—	April 1, 2016	Haleakala	Pan-STARRS 1	KOR	1.1 km	MPC · JPL
787788	2016 GS_{300}	—	April 5, 2016	Haleakala	Pan-STARRS 1	·	1.1 km	MPC · JPL
787789	2016 GD_{302}	—	April 4, 2016	Haleakala	Pan-STARRS 1	TRE	1.5 km	MPC · JPL
787790	2016 GF_{302}	—	April 3, 2016	Mount Lemmon	Mount Lemmon Survey	·	1.3 km	MPC · JPL
787791	2016 GJ_{302}	—	September 14, 2013	Haleakala	Pan-STARRS 1	·	1.5 km	MPC · JPL
787792	2016 GS_{302}	—	April 3, 2016	Haleakala	Pan-STARRS 1	615	1.0 km	MPC · JPL
787793	2016 GX_{302}	—	January 14, 2015	Haleakala	Pan-STARRS 1	·	1.1 km	MPC · JPL
787794	2016 GO_{303}	—	April 15, 2016	Haleakala	Pan-STARRS 1	·	1.8 km	MPC · JPL
787795	2016 GS_{304}	—	April 12, 2016	Haleakala	Pan-STARRS 1	·	2.3 km	MPC · JPL
787796	2016 GV_{304}	—	April 4, 2016	Haleakala	Pan-STARRS 1	·	2.7 km	MPC · JPL
787797	2016 GC_{308}	—	January 20, 2015	Haleakala	Pan-STARRS 1	·	2.1 km	MPC · JPL
787798	2016 GW_{310}	—	April 11, 2016	Haleakala	Pan-STARRS 1	·	2.2 km	MPC · JPL
787799	2016 GB_{311}	—	April 3, 2016	Haleakala	Pan-STARRS 1	L4	6.0 km	MPC · JPL
787800	2016 GC_{311}	—	April 2, 2016	Mount Lemmon	Mount Lemmon Survey	·	1.5 km	MPC · JPL

== 787801–787900 ==
back to top

Designation			Discovery			Properties		Ref
Permanent	Provisional	Named after	Date	Site	Discoverer(s)	Category	Diam.	Ref
787801	2016 GQ_{311}	—	April 10, 2016	Haleakala	Pan-STARRS 1	L4	6.5 km	MPC · JPL
787802	2016 GR_{311}	—	April 10, 2016	Haleakala	Pan-STARRS 1	L4	6.8 km	MPC · JPL
787803	2016 GS_{311}	—	April 5, 2016	Haleakala	Pan-STARRS 1	L4	5.5 km	MPC · JPL
787804	2016 GB_{314}	—	April 3, 2016	Haleakala	Pan-STARRS 1	·	2.3 km	MPC · JPL
787805	2016 GW_{314}	—	April 3, 2016	Haleakala	Pan-STARRS 1	VER	2.2 km	MPC · JPL
787806	2016 GM_{317}	—	April 5, 2016	Haleakala	Pan-STARRS 1	·	1.2 km	MPC · JPL
787807	2016 GW_{319}	—	April 10, 2016	Haleakala	Pan-STARRS 1	·	2.1 km	MPC · JPL
787808	2016 GW_{322}	—	August 30, 2013	Haleakala	Pan-STARRS 1	·	870 m	MPC · JPL
787809	2016 GM_{323}	—	April 1, 2016	Haleakala	Pan-STARRS 1	·	1.4 km	MPC · JPL
787810	2016 GQ_{324}	—	October 24, 2013	Mount Lemmon	Mount Lemmon Survey	·	1.2 km	MPC · JPL
787811	2016 GA_{330}	—	April 3, 2016	Haleakala	Pan-STARRS 1	EOS	1.3 km	MPC · JPL
787812	2016 GJ_{331}	—	September 3, 2007	Mount Lemmon	Mount Lemmon Survey	·	2.3 km	MPC · JPL
787813	2016 GT_{331}	—	August 15, 2013	Haleakala	Pan-STARRS 1	·	1.4 km	MPC · JPL
787814	2016 GQ_{336}	—	April 2, 2016	Haleakala	Pan-STARRS 1	HOF	1.7 km	MPC · JPL
787815	2016 GN_{340}	—	April 3, 2016	Haleakala	Pan-STARRS 1	·	2.4 km	MPC · JPL
787816	2016 GJ_{341}	—	April 3, 2016	Haleakala	Pan-STARRS 1	EOS	1.4 km	MPC · JPL
787817	2016 GU_{341}	—	January 16, 2015	Haleakala	Pan-STARRS 1	·	1.2 km	MPC · JPL
787818	2016 GF_{342}	—	August 13, 2012	Kitt Peak	Spacewatch	·	2.4 km	MPC · JPL
787819	2016 GJ_{343}	—	April 1, 2016	Haleakala	Pan-STARRS 1	·	1.3 km	MPC · JPL
787820	2016 GR_{343}	—	April 1, 2016	Haleakala	Pan-STARRS 1	·	1.4 km	MPC · JPL
787821	2016 GV_{343}	—	April 1, 2016	Haleakala	Pan-STARRS 1	·	1.4 km	MPC · JPL
787822	2016 GA_{345}	—	April 3, 2016	Haleakala	Pan-STARRS 1	·	1.3 km	MPC · JPL
787823	2016 GD_{345}	—	April 4, 2016	Mount Lemmon	Mount Lemmon Survey	·	1.4 km	MPC · JPL
787824	2016 GN_{346}	—	April 3, 2016	Haleakala	Pan-STARRS 1	AGN	900 m	MPC · JPL
787825	2016 GS_{346}	—	January 19, 2015	Mount Lemmon	Mount Lemmon Survey	·	1.6 km	MPC · JPL
787826	2016 GH_{348}	—	April 3, 2016	Haleakala	Pan-STARRS 1	THM	1.8 km	MPC · JPL
787827	2016 GW_{350}	—	April 5, 2016	Haleakala	Pan-STARRS 1	·	1.2 km	MPC · JPL
787828	2016 GU_{352}	—	April 3, 2016	Haleakala	Pan-STARRS 1	·	1.7 km	MPC · JPL
787829	2016 GP_{355}	—	April 11, 2016	Haleakala	Pan-STARRS 1	L4	6.9 km	MPC · JPL
787830	2016 GZ_{355}	—	August 25, 2012	Mount Lemmon	Mount Lemmon Survey	VER	1.8 km	MPC · JPL
787831	2016 GC_{357}	—	September 23, 2008	Kitt Peak	Spacewatch	·	1.2 km	MPC · JPL
787832	2016 GP_{357}	—	April 5, 2016	Haleakala	Pan-STARRS 1	·	1.8 km	MPC · JPL
787833	2016 GW_{358}	—	April 1, 2016	Mount Lemmon	Mount Lemmon Survey	·	1.3 km	MPC · JPL
787834	2016 GK_{359}	—	April 1, 2016	Haleakala	Pan-STARRS 1	KOR	940 m	MPC · JPL
787835	2016 GL_{359}	—	April 1, 2016	Haleakala	Pan-STARRS 1	KOR	1.0 km	MPC · JPL
787836	2016 GO_{359}	—	April 3, 2016	Mount Lemmon	Mount Lemmon Survey	HOF	1.7 km	MPC · JPL
787837	2016 GU_{359}	—	April 2, 2016	Haleakala	Pan-STARRS 1	KOR	970 m	MPC · JPL
787838	2016 GC_{360}	—	April 1, 2016	Haleakala	Pan-STARRS 1	·	2.1 km	MPC · JPL
787839	2016 GT_{391}	—	April 5, 2016	Haleakala	Pan-STARRS 1	·	2.5 km	MPC · JPL
787840	2016 HF_{9}	—	October 26, 2009	Mount Lemmon	Mount Lemmon Survey	·	1.6 km	MPC · JPL
787841	2016 HM_{10}	—	January 20, 2015	Kitt Peak	Spacewatch	·	2.3 km	MPC · JPL
787842	2016 HY_{13}	—	April 30, 2016	Haleakala	Pan-STARRS 1	·	1.4 km	MPC · JPL
787843	2016 HN_{18}	—	February 5, 2011	Haleakala	Pan-STARRS 1	·	1.1 km	MPC · JPL
787844	2016 HS_{21}	—	April 30, 2016	Mount Lemmon	Mount Lemmon Survey	·	2.0 km	MPC · JPL
787845	2016 HO_{22}	—	February 1, 2006	Kitt Peak	Spacewatch	AGN	1.1 km	MPC · JPL
787846	2016 HB_{26}	—	March 6, 2011	Mount Lemmon	Mount Lemmon Survey	DOR	1.9 km	MPC · JPL
787847	2016 HH_{28}	—	April 27, 2016	Mount Lemmon	Mount Lemmon Survey	·	1.3 km	MPC · JPL
787848	2016 HW_{31}	—	April 30, 2016	Mount Lemmon	Mount Lemmon Survey	·	1.1 km	MPC · JPL
787849	2016 HG_{32}	—	April 16, 2016	Haleakala	Pan-STARRS 1	·	1.5 km	MPC · JPL
787850	2016 HO_{32}	—	April 30, 2016	Kitt Peak	Spacewatch	ELF	2.9 km	MPC · JPL
787851	2016 HJ_{33}	—	April 30, 2016	Haleakala	Pan-STARRS 1	·	1.2 km	MPC · JPL
787852	2016 HP_{33}	—	January 17, 2015	Haleakala	Pan-STARRS 1	·	1.6 km	MPC · JPL
787853	2016 HE_{35}	—	April 30, 2016	Haleakala	Pan-STARRS 1	·	2.2 km	MPC · JPL
787854	2016 HA_{39}	—	April 30, 2016	Haleakala	Pan-STARRS 1	·	2.2 km	MPC · JPL
787855	2016 HV_{42}	—	April 30, 2016	Haleakala	Pan-STARRS 1	·	2.0 km	MPC · JPL
787856	2016 HG_{43}	—	February 17, 2015	Haleakala	Pan-STARRS 1	·	2.0 km	MPC · JPL
787857	2016 HK_{44}	—	January 19, 2015	Haleakala	Pan-STARRS 1	·	1.3 km	MPC · JPL
787858	2016 HY_{44}	—	November 21, 2014	Haleakala	Pan-STARRS 1	·	2.5 km	MPC · JPL
787859	2016 HA_{47}	—	January 20, 2015	Haleakala	Pan-STARRS 1	·	1.9 km	MPC · JPL
787860	2016 HB_{50}	—	April 30, 2016	Haleakala	Pan-STARRS 1	·	2.1 km	MPC · JPL
787861	2016 HE_{51}	—	April 30, 2016	Haleakala	Pan-STARRS 1	·	1.6 km	MPC · JPL
787862	2016 JL_{3}	—	April 12, 2016	Haleakala	Pan-STARRS 1	·	1.4 km	MPC · JPL
787863	2016 JB_{41}	—	May 6, 2016	Haleakala	Pan-STARRS 1	BRA	1.2 km	MPC · JPL
787864	2016 JM_{42}	—	May 1, 2016	Haleakala	Pan-STARRS 1	·	2.3 km	MPC · JPL
787865	2016 JP_{42}	—	May 13, 2016	Haleakala	Pan-STARRS 1	·	2.3 km	MPC · JPL
787866	2016 JF_{47}	—	May 2, 2016	Mount Lemmon	Mount Lemmon Survey	·	1.3 km	MPC · JPL
787867	2016 JP_{51}	—	November 30, 2008	Mount Lemmon	Mount Lemmon Survey	·	1.9 km	MPC · JPL
787868	2016 JQ_{51}	—	May 1, 2016	Haleakala	Pan-STARRS 1	·	1.2 km	MPC · JPL
787869	2016 JV_{51}	—	May 4, 2016	Haleakala	Pan-STARRS 1	·	1.2 km	MPC · JPL
787870	2016 JC_{54}	—	May 3, 2016	Mount Lemmon	Mount Lemmon Survey	·	2.5 km	MPC · JPL
787871	2016 JR_{54}	—	May 10, 2016	Mount Lemmon	Mount Lemmon Survey	L4	6.1 km	MPC · JPL
787872	2016 JU_{54}	—	May 6, 2016	Haleakala	Pan-STARRS 1	L4	6.6 km	MPC · JPL
787873	2016 JT_{56}	—	May 7, 2016	Haleakala	Pan-STARRS 1	URS	2.3 km	MPC · JPL
787874	2016 JA_{57}	—	October 8, 2007	Mount Lemmon	Mount Lemmon Survey	·	1.6 km	MPC · JPL
787875	2016 JT_{59}	—	May 1, 2016	Cerro Tololo	DECam	·	2.1 km	MPC · JPL
787876	2016 JK_{60}	—	May 6, 2016	Haleakala	Pan-STARRS 1	·	1.6 km	MPC · JPL
787877	2016 JS_{65}	—	May 1, 2016	Haleakala	Pan-STARRS 1	·	2.3 km	MPC · JPL
787878	2016 JQ_{66}	—	May 3, 2016	Mount Lemmon	Mount Lemmon Survey	·	2.5 km	MPC · JPL
787879	2016 JO_{70}	—	May 5, 2016	Haleakala	Pan-STARRS 1	·	1.4 km	MPC · JPL
787880	2016 JT_{70}	—	May 1, 2016	Haleakala	Pan-STARRS 1	·	1.5 km	MPC · JPL
787881	2016 JV_{71}	—	January 20, 2015	Haleakala	Pan-STARRS 1	·	1.3 km	MPC · JPL
787882	2016 JG_{72}	—	January 19, 2015	Haleakala	Pan-STARRS 1	·	1.4 km	MPC · JPL
787883	2016 JD_{75}	—	May 1, 2016	Haleakala	Pan-STARRS 1	KOR	970 m	MPC · JPL
787884	2016 JB_{76}	—	May 1, 2016	Cerro Tololo	DECam	L4	5.5 km	MPC · JPL
787885	2016 JM_{77}	—	May 1, 2016	Cerro Tololo	DECam	·	1.2 km	MPC · JPL
787886	2016 JB_{81}	—	May 1, 2016	Cerro Tololo	DECam	·	2.1 km	MPC · JPL
787887	2016 JH_{82}	—	May 1, 2016	Cerro Tololo	DECam	L4	5.6 km	MPC · JPL
787888	2016 JC_{83}	—	May 1, 2016	Cerro Tololo	DECam	NAE	1.7 km	MPC · JPL
787889	2016 JU_{83}	—	January 27, 2015	Haleakala	Pan-STARRS 1	·	1.5 km	MPC · JPL
787890	2016 JN_{86}	—	May 1, 2016	Cerro Tololo	DECam	·	1.7 km	MPC · JPL
787891	2016 KP	—	March 13, 2016	Mount Lemmon	Mount Lemmon Survey	·	1.9 km	MPC · JPL
787892	2016 KU_{1}	—	March 31, 2008	Catalina	CSS	·	1.2 km	MPC · JPL
787893	2016 KP_{6}	—	November 2, 2007	Mount Lemmon	Mount Lemmon Survey	·	1.7 km	MPC · JPL
787894	2016 KS_{6}	—	May 4, 2016	Haleakala	Pan-STARRS 1	·	1 km	MPC · JPL
787895	2016 KL_{15}	—	May 30, 2016	Haleakala	Pan-STARRS 1	·	1.8 km	MPC · JPL
787896	2016 LX_{4}	—	May 5, 2016	Mount Lemmon	Mount Lemmon Survey	L4	5.6 km	MPC · JPL
787897	2016 LA_{14}	—	January 18, 2012	Mount Lemmon	Mount Lemmon Survey	L4	6.1 km	MPC · JPL
787898	2016 LB_{14}	—	June 5, 2016	Haleakala	Pan-STARRS 1	L4	6.4 km	MPC · JPL
787899	2016 LA_{17}	—	June 5, 2016	Haleakala	Pan-STARRS 1	EOS	1.2 km	MPC · JPL
787900	2016 LS_{20}	—	June 4, 2016	Mount Lemmon	Mount Lemmon Survey	·	2.2 km	MPC · JPL

== 787901–788000 ==
back to top

Designation			Discovery			Properties		Ref
Permanent	Provisional	Named after	Date	Site	Discoverer(s)	Category	Diam.	Ref
787901	2016 LK_{23}	—	May 30, 2016	Haleakala	Pan-STARRS 1	·	2.0 km	MPC · JPL
787902	2016 LX_{24}	—	June 5, 2016	Haleakala	Pan-STARRS 1	·	1.5 km	MPC · JPL
787903	2016 LK_{27}	—	May 30, 2016	Haleakala	Pan-STARRS 1	·	1.7 km	MPC · JPL
787904	2016 LW_{27}	—	June 5, 2016	Haleakala	Pan-STARRS 1	·	2.1 km	MPC · JPL
787905	2016 LC_{29}	—	May 30, 2016	Haleakala	Pan-STARRS 1	·	1.4 km	MPC · JPL
787906	2016 LL_{36}	—	June 5, 2016	Haleakala	Pan-STARRS 1	EOS	1.5 km	MPC · JPL
787907	2016 LL_{39}	—	October 9, 2012	Mount Lemmon	Mount Lemmon Survey	·	1.7 km	MPC · JPL
787908	2016 LP_{40}	—	May 30, 2016	Haleakala	Pan-STARRS 1	·	1.3 km	MPC · JPL
787909	2016 LV_{40}	—	September 22, 2012	Mount Lemmon	Mount Lemmon Survey	EOS	1.3 km	MPC · JPL
787910	2016 LR_{47}	—	June 3, 2016	Haleakala	Pan-STARRS 1	·	1.3 km	MPC · JPL
787911	2016 LM_{54}	—	June 7, 2016	Haleakala	Pan-STARRS 1	·	2.2 km	MPC · JPL
787912	2016 LY_{60}	—	June 7, 2016	Haleakala	Pan-STARRS 1	·	1.2 km	MPC · JPL
787913	2016 LK_{61}	—	June 7, 2016	Haleakala	Pan-STARRS 1	·	2.0 km	MPC · JPL
787914	2016 LW_{61}	—	March 22, 2015	Haleakala	Pan-STARRS 1	·	1.9 km	MPC · JPL
787915	2016 LH_{64}	—	December 11, 2013	Haleakala	Pan-STARRS 1	·	940 m	MPC · JPL
787916	2016 LH_{66}	—	December 29, 2014	Haleakala	Pan-STARRS 1	DOR	1.7 km	MPC · JPL
787917	2016 LK_{67}	—	January 17, 2015	Haleakala	Pan-STARRS 1	·	1.9 km	MPC · JPL
787918	2016 LS_{67}	—	June 5, 2016	Haleakala	Pan-STARRS 1	·	1.8 km	MPC · JPL
787919	2016 LD_{78}	—	June 5, 2016	Haleakala	Pan-STARRS 1	·	1.4 km	MPC · JPL
787920	2016 LJ_{83}	—	June 3, 2016	Haleakala	Pan-STARRS 1	MAR	610 m	MPC · JPL
787921	2016 LH_{84}	—	June 5, 2016	Haleakala	Pan-STARRS 1	·	1.0 km	MPC · JPL
787922	2016 LL_{84}	—	June 7, 2016	Haleakala	Pan-STARRS 1	·	1.9 km	MPC · JPL
787923	2016 LO_{85}	—	June 8, 2016	Haleakala	Pan-STARRS 1	·	1.8 km	MPC · JPL
787924	2016 LW_{86}	—	June 8, 2016	Haleakala	Pan-STARRS 1	EOS	1.4 km	MPC · JPL
787925	2016 LF_{88}	—	June 11, 2016	Mount Lemmon	Mount Lemmon Survey	·	1.3 km	MPC · JPL
787926	2016 LU_{92}	—	June 8, 2016	Haleakala	Pan-STARRS 1	KOR	1.0 km	MPC · JPL
787927	2016 LY_{93}	—	June 5, 2016	Haleakala	Pan-STARRS 1	·	2.2 km	MPC · JPL
787928	2016 LL_{95}	—	June 5, 2016	Haleakala	Pan-STARRS 1	L4	6.9 km	MPC · JPL
787929	2016 LR_{99}	—	June 5, 2016	Haleakala	Pan-STARRS 1	·	1.5 km	MPC · JPL
787930	2016 MN	—	December 24, 2005	Kitt Peak	Spacewatch	·	1.7 km	MPC · JPL
787931	2016 MF_{4}	—	July 3, 2008	Mount Lemmon	Mount Lemmon Survey	·	930 m	MPC · JPL
787932	2016 MD_{7}	—	June 28, 2016	Haleakala	Pan-STARRS 1	·	2.0 km	MPC · JPL
787933	2016 NF	—	July 1, 2016	Haleakala	Pan-STARRS 1	AMO +1km	780 m	MPC · JPL
787934	2016 NO_{4}	—	June 8, 2016	Haleakala	Pan-STARRS 1	·	1.9 km	MPC · JPL
787935	2016 NK_{13}	—	June 7, 2016	Mount Lemmon	Mount Lemmon Survey	·	2.4 km	MPC · JPL
787936	2016 NT_{14}	—	May 12, 2011	Kitt Peak	Spacewatch	·	1.5 km	MPC · JPL
787937	2016 NZ_{28}	—	August 26, 2012	Haleakala	Pan-STARRS 1	·	1.0 km	MPC · JPL
787938	2016 NQ_{30}	—	July 3, 2016	Mount Lemmon	Mount Lemmon Survey	·	1.5 km	MPC · JPL
787939	2016 NP_{43}	—	September 4, 2000	Kitt Peak	Spacewatch	·	1.9 km	MPC · JPL
787940	2016 NO_{59}	—	July 4, 2016	Haleakala	Pan-STARRS 1	·	2.4 km	MPC · JPL
787941	2016 NS_{60}	—	July 28, 2011	Haleakala	Pan-STARRS 1	·	1.7 km	MPC · JPL
787942	2016 NV_{60}	—	July 7, 2016	Haleakala	Pan-STARRS 1	·	2.5 km	MPC · JPL
787943	2016 NZ_{60}	—	July 7, 2016	Haleakala	Pan-STARRS 1	·	1.3 km	MPC · JPL
787944	2016 NA_{62}	—	June 17, 2010	Mount Lemmon	Mount Lemmon Survey	·	2.5 km	MPC · JPL
787945	2016 NC_{64}	—	July 13, 2016	Haleakala	Pan-STARRS 1	ELF	3.1 km	MPC · JPL
787946	2016 NE_{65}	—	September 24, 2008	Mount Lemmon	Mount Lemmon Survey	EUN	930 m	MPC · JPL
787947	2016 NU_{70}	—	December 22, 2012	Haleakala	Pan-STARRS 1	URS	2.1 km	MPC · JPL
787948	2016 NL_{71}	—	September 15, 2012	Mount Lemmon	Mount Lemmon Survey	·	1.0 km	MPC · JPL
787949	2016 NN_{73}	—	December 23, 2012	Haleakala	Pan-STARRS 1	VER	2.3 km	MPC · JPL
787950	2016 NN_{76}	—	July 4, 2016	Haleakala	Pan-STARRS 1	·	1.5 km	MPC · JPL
787951	2016 NR_{79}	—	October 1, 2011	Kitt Peak	Spacewatch	VER	2.0 km	MPC · JPL
787952	2016 NT_{79}	—	April 13, 2015	Haleakala	Pan-STARRS 1	·	2.4 km	MPC · JPL
787953	2016 NE_{80}	—	July 7, 2016	Haleakala	Pan-STARRS 1	·	2.5 km	MPC · JPL
787954	2016 NO_{80}	—	July 7, 2016	Haleakala	Pan-STARRS 1	·	2.4 km	MPC · JPL
787955	2016 NG_{84}	—	January 31, 2013	Mount Lemmon	Mount Lemmon Survey	VER	2.5 km	MPC · JPL
787956	2016 NK_{86}	—	September 20, 2011	Haleakala	Pan-STARRS 1	·	1.7 km	MPC · JPL
787957	2016 NM_{87}	—	July 13, 2016	Haleakala	Pan-STARRS 1	·	1.4 km	MPC · JPL
787958	2016 NP_{89}	—	July 14, 2016	Haleakala	Pan-STARRS 1	·	1.9 km	MPC · JPL
787959	2016 ND_{98}	—	July 9, 2016	Mount Lemmon	Mount Lemmon Survey	·	2.4 km	MPC · JPL
787960	2016 NO_{107}	—	July 4, 2016	Haleakala	Pan-STARRS 1	EOS	1.4 km	MPC · JPL
787961	2016 NB_{108}	—	October 17, 2012	Haleakala	Pan-STARRS 1	·	1.3 km	MPC · JPL
787962	2016 NM_{108}	—	September 28, 2000	Kitt Peak	Spacewatch	·	2.1 km	MPC · JPL
787963	2016 NC_{109}	—	July 13, 2016	Haleakala	Pan-STARRS 1	·	2.0 km	MPC · JPL
787964	2016 NJ_{109}	—	July 13, 2016	Haleakala	Pan-STARRS 1	T_{j} (2.96)	2.9 km	MPC · JPL
787965	2016 NK_{109}	—	July 14, 2016	Mount Lemmon	Mount Lemmon Survey	·	2.0 km	MPC · JPL
787966	2016 ND_{110}	—	July 4, 2016	Haleakala	Pan-STARRS 1	·	1.9 km	MPC · JPL
787967	2016 NZ_{110}	—	July 11, 2016	Haleakala	Pan-STARRS 1	·	2.5 km	MPC · JPL
787968	2016 NV_{111}	—	July 7, 2016	Haleakala	Pan-STARRS 1	·	2.2 km	MPC · JPL
787969	2016 NX_{111}	—	July 9, 2016	Haleakala	Pan-STARRS 1	EOS	1.6 km	MPC · JPL
787970	2016 NM_{112}	—	July 5, 2016	Haleakala	Pan-STARRS 1	·	2.3 km	MPC · JPL
787971	2016 NR_{118}	—	July 14, 2016	Haleakala	Pan-STARRS 1	·	730 m	MPC · JPL
787972	2016 NJ_{120}	—	July 11, 2016	Haleakala	Pan-STARRS 1	·	2.3 km	MPC · JPL
787973	2016 NH_{121}	—	July 12, 2016	Haleakala	Pan-STARRS 1	·	1.9 km	MPC · JPL
787974	2016 NC_{133}	—	July 7, 2016	Haleakala	Pan-STARRS 1	·	1.9 km	MPC · JPL
787975	2016 NW_{134}	—	July 3, 2016	Mount Lemmon	Mount Lemmon Survey	·	2.2 km	MPC · JPL
787976	2016 NU_{136}	—	July 11, 2016	Haleakala	Pan-STARRS 1	·	1.5 km	MPC · JPL
787977	2016 NK_{137}	—	July 5, 2016	Haleakala	Pan-STARRS 1	EOS	1.2 km	MPC · JPL
787978	2016 NG_{138}	—	July 4, 2016	Haleakala	Pan-STARRS 1	·	1.7 km	MPC · JPL
787979	2016 NU_{140}	—	July 14, 2016	Haleakala	Pan-STARRS 1	·	1.5 km	MPC · JPL
787980	2016 NO_{142}	—	July 7, 2016	Haleakala	Pan-STARRS 1	T_{j} (2.92)	2.7 km	MPC · JPL
787981	2016 NO_{146}	—	July 14, 2016	Haleakala	Pan-STARRS 1	THM	1.7 km	MPC · JPL
787982	2016 NM_{147}	—	July 9, 2016	Haleakala	Pan-STARRS 1	·	2.0 km	MPC · JPL
787983	2016 NG_{148}	—	July 9, 2016	Haleakala	Pan-STARRS 1	ELF	2.8 km	MPC · JPL
787984	2016 NY_{153}	—	October 16, 2012	Mount Lemmon	Mount Lemmon Survey	·	1.2 km	MPC · JPL
787985	2016 NO_{154}	—	July 8, 2016	Haleakala	Pan-STARRS 1	·	1.5 km	MPC · JPL
787986	2016 NA_{156}	—	July 12, 2016	Mount Lemmon	Mount Lemmon Survey	·	1.4 km	MPC · JPL
787987	2016 NK_{161}	—	July 11, 2016	Haleakala	Pan-STARRS 1	·	2.5 km	MPC · JPL
787988	2016 NP_{161}	—	July 5, 2016	Haleakala	Pan-STARRS 1	EOS	1.2 km	MPC · JPL
787989	2016 NQ_{161}	—	July 13, 2016	Haleakala	Pan-STARRS 1	·	2.1 km	MPC · JPL
787990	2016 NJ_{163}	—	July 5, 2016	Haleakala	Pan-STARRS 1	·	2.2 km	MPC · JPL
787991	2016 NP_{163}	—	July 9, 2016	Haleakala	Pan-STARRS 1	·	2.1 km	MPC · JPL
787992	2016 NS_{163}	—	July 12, 2016	Mount Lemmon	Mount Lemmon Survey	·	2.3 km	MPC · JPL
787993	2016 NY_{164}	—	January 22, 2015	Haleakala	Pan-STARRS 1	·	1.5 km	MPC · JPL
787994	2016 NG_{165}	—	January 3, 2014	Kitt Peak	Spacewatch	EOS	1.4 km	MPC · JPL
787995	2016 NO_{166}	—	July 14, 2016	Mount Lemmon	Mount Lemmon Survey	·	2.6 km	MPC · JPL
787996	2016 NR_{166}	—	July 14, 2016	Haleakala	Pan-STARRS 1	·	1.7 km	MPC · JPL
787997	2016 NB_{167}	—	July 6, 2016	Haleakala	Pan-STARRS 1	·	1.5 km	MPC · JPL
787998	2016 NA_{169}	—	July 14, 2016	Haleakala	Pan-STARRS 1	·	2.0 km	MPC · JPL
787999	2016 NZ_{171}	—	October 22, 2003	Kitt Peak	Deep Ecliptic Survey	AGN	730 m	MPC · JPL
788000	2016 NL_{173}	—	July 11, 2016	Haleakala	Pan-STARRS 1	·	2.4 km	MPC · JPL

back to top
