= List of minor planets: 795001–796000 =

The following is a partial list of minor planets, running from minor-planet number 795001 through 796000, inclusive. The primary data for this and other partial lists is based on JPL's "Small-Body Orbital Elements" and data available from the Minor Planet Center. Critical list information is also provided by the MPC, unless otherwise specified from Lowell Observatory. A detailed description of the table's columns and additional sources are given on the main page including a complete list of every page in this series, and a statistical break-up on the dynamical classification of minor planets.

Also see the summary list of all named bodies in numerical and alphabetical order, and the corresponding naming citations for the number range of this particular list. New namings may only be added to this list after official publication, as the preannouncement of names is condemned by the Working Group for Small Bodies Nomenclature of the International Astronomical Union.

Near-Earth obj.	MBA (inner)	MBA (outer)	Centaur
Mars-crosser	MBA (middle)	Jupiter trojan	Trans-Neptunian obj.
Unclassified

== 795001–795100 ==
Designation			Discovery			Properties		Ref
Permanent	Provisional	Named after	Date	Site	Discoverer(s)	Category	Diam.	Ref
795001	2007 UY_{134}	—	October 16, 2007	Kitt Peak	Spacewatch	WIT	700 m	MPC · JPL
795002	2007 UB_{135}	—	October 30, 2007	Mount Lemmon	Mount Lemmon Survey	·	1.2 km	MPC · JPL
795003	2007 UJ_{147}	—	October 18, 2007	Kitt Peak	Spacewatch	KOR	900 m	MPC · JPL
795004	2007 UD_{150}	—	March 24, 2014	Haleakala	Pan-STARRS 1	·	1.3 km	MPC · JPL
795005	2007 UC_{151}	—	June 18, 2010	Mount Lemmon	Mount Lemmon Survey	·	1 km	MPC · JPL
795006	2007 UA_{152}	—	October 18, 2007	Mount Lemmon	Mount Lemmon Survey	·	740 m	MPC · JPL
795007	2007 US_{155}	—	October 21, 2007	Kitt Peak	Spacewatch	·	1.3 km	MPC · JPL
795008	2007 UT_{155}	—	October 30, 2007	Kitt Peak	Spacewatch	·	2.6 km	MPC · JPL
795009	2007 UM_{158}	—	October 30, 2007	Kitt Peak	Spacewatch	·	1.2 km	MPC · JPL
795010	2007 UH_{159}	—	October 16, 2007	Kitt Peak	Spacewatch	·	1.2 km	MPC · JPL
795011	2007 UB_{161}	—	October 18, 2007	Kitt Peak	Spacewatch	·	970 m	MPC · JPL
795012	2007 UN_{161}	—	October 16, 2007	Mount Lemmon	Mount Lemmon Survey	·	1.7 km	MPC · JPL
795013	2007 UX_{161}	—	October 21, 2007	Mount Lemmon	Mount Lemmon Survey	·	2.1 km	MPC · JPL
795014	2007 UF_{162}	—	October 18, 2007	Mount Lemmon	Mount Lemmon Survey	KOR	1.1 km	MPC · JPL
795015	2007 UO_{162}	—	October 18, 2007	Kitt Peak	Spacewatch	THB	1.7 km	MPC · JPL
795016	2007 UE_{165}	—	October 16, 2007	Mount Lemmon	Mount Lemmon Survey	·	1.3 km	MPC · JPL
795017	2007 UH_{165}	—	October 16, 2007	Mount Lemmon	Mount Lemmon Survey	·	1.7 km	MPC · JPL
795018	2007 UL_{165}	—	October 30, 2007	Mount Lemmon	Mount Lemmon Survey	·	1.2 km	MPC · JPL
795019	2007 UA_{166}	—	October 21, 2007	Mount Lemmon	Mount Lemmon Survey	EOS	1.2 km	MPC · JPL
795020	2007 VM_{16}	—	November 1, 2007	Mount Lemmon	Mount Lemmon Survey	·	1.4 km	MPC · JPL
795021	2007 VY_{16}	—	October 10, 2007	Kitt Peak	Spacewatch	·	1.3 km	MPC · JPL
795022	2007 VT_{21}	—	November 2, 2007	Mount Lemmon	Mount Lemmon Survey	EUN	710 m	MPC · JPL
795023	2007 VY_{21}	—	October 12, 2007	Mount Lemmon	Mount Lemmon Survey	·	2.2 km	MPC · JPL
795024	2007 VX_{33}	—	November 2, 2007	Kitt Peak	Spacewatch	·	1.0 km	MPC · JPL
795025	2007 VN_{37}	—	November 2, 2007	Mount Lemmon	Mount Lemmon Survey	·	1.6 km	MPC · JPL
795026	2007 VC_{43}	—	October 20, 2007	Kitt Peak	Spacewatch	·	520 m	MPC · JPL
795027	2007 VC_{61}	—	November 1, 2007	Kitt Peak	Spacewatch	·	1.0 km	MPC · JPL
795028	2007 VP_{68}	—	November 3, 2007	Mount Lemmon	Mount Lemmon Survey	·	1.7 km	MPC · JPL
795029	2007 VZ_{77}	—	November 3, 2007	Kitt Peak	Spacewatch	·	1.4 km	MPC · JPL
795030	2007 VP_{105}	—	November 3, 2007	Kitt Peak	Spacewatch	·	1.6 km	MPC · JPL
795031	2007 VH_{106}	—	November 3, 2007	Kitt Peak	Spacewatch	·	2.1 km	MPC · JPL
795032	2007 VK_{107}	—	November 3, 2007	Kitt Peak	Spacewatch	·	1.4 km	MPC · JPL
795033	2007 VF_{115}	—	November 3, 2007	Kitt Peak	Spacewatch	·	1.4 km	MPC · JPL
795034	2007 VR_{125}	—	October 8, 2007	Kitt Peak	Spacewatch	·	1.5 km	MPC · JPL
795035	2007 VE_{134}	—	November 3, 2007	Kitt Peak	Spacewatch	EOS	1.4 km	MPC · JPL
795036	2007 VP_{137}	—	October 10, 2007	Kitt Peak	Spacewatch	·	970 m	MPC · JPL
795037	2007 VF_{140}	—	November 4, 2007	Kitt Peak	Spacewatch	·	1.5 km	MPC · JPL
795038	2007 VM_{140}	—	November 4, 2007	Kitt Peak	Spacewatch	·	980 m	MPC · JPL
795039	2007 VW_{140}	—	November 4, 2007	Mount Lemmon	Mount Lemmon Survey	·	1.2 km	MPC · JPL
795040	2007 VE_{150}	—	November 7, 2007	Mount Lemmon	Mount Lemmon Survey	·	2.0 km	MPC · JPL
795041	2007 VV_{156}	—	November 5, 2007	Kitt Peak	Spacewatch	·	710 m	MPC · JPL
795042	2007 VE_{161}	—	November 5, 2007	Kitt Peak	Spacewatch	·	1.1 km	MPC · JPL
795043	2007 VS_{173}	—	November 2, 2007	Kitt Peak	Spacewatch	·	2.1 km	MPC · JPL
795044	2007 VB_{197}	—	November 7, 2007	Mount Lemmon	Mount Lemmon Survey	·	1.2 km	MPC · JPL
795045	2007 VP_{199}	—	November 9, 2007	Mount Lemmon	Mount Lemmon Survey	·	1.6 km	MPC · JPL
795046	2007 VO_{201}	—	November 9, 2007	Mount Lemmon	Mount Lemmon Survey	·	1.5 km	MPC · JPL
795047	2007 VV_{214}	—	November 9, 2007	Kitt Peak	Spacewatch	·	1.4 km	MPC · JPL
795048	2007 VO_{227}	—	November 12, 2007	Mount Lemmon	Mount Lemmon Survey	·	2.3 km	MPC · JPL
795049	2007 VT_{230}	—	November 7, 2007	Kitt Peak	Spacewatch	·	620 m	MPC · JPL
795050	2007 VM_{235}	—	November 9, 2007	Kitt Peak	Spacewatch	·	1.5 km	MPC · JPL
795051	2007 VH_{236}	—	November 3, 2007	Kitt Peak	Spacewatch	·	1.7 km	MPC · JPL
795052	2007 VM_{237}	—	October 10, 2007	Mount Lemmon	Mount Lemmon Survey	EOS	1.2 km	MPC · JPL
795053	2007 VF_{248}	—	November 2, 2007	Mount Lemmon	Mount Lemmon Survey	·	1.2 km	MPC · JPL
795054	2007 VG_{248}	—	November 13, 2007	Mount Lemmon	Mount Lemmon Survey	·	1.4 km	MPC · JPL
795055	2007 VU_{248}	—	November 14, 2007	Mount Lemmon	Mount Lemmon Survey	EOS	1.4 km	MPC · JPL
795056	2007 VE_{249}	—	November 14, 2007	Mount Lemmon	Mount Lemmon Survey	·	1.7 km	MPC · JPL
795057	2007 VE_{258}	—	November 15, 2007	Mount Lemmon	Mount Lemmon Survey	·	1.3 km	MPC · JPL
795058	2007 VD_{262}	—	November 13, 2007	Mount Lemmon	Mount Lemmon Survey	·	820 m	MPC · JPL
795059	2007 VX_{263}	—	November 5, 2007	Kitt Peak	Spacewatch	·	500 m	MPC · JPL
795060	2007 VQ_{265}	—	September 18, 2007	Mount Lemmon	Mount Lemmon Survey	·	1.8 km	MPC · JPL
795061	2007 VX_{274}	—	November 13, 2007	Mount Lemmon	Mount Lemmon Survey	·	1.9 km	MPC · JPL
795062	2007 VN_{283}	—	November 5, 2007	Kitt Peak	Spacewatch	(5)	870 m	MPC · JPL
795063	2007 VG_{288}	—	November 12, 2007	Mount Lemmon	Mount Lemmon Survey	·	1.3 km	MPC · JPL
795064	2007 VK_{295}	—	November 13, 2007	Kitt Peak	Spacewatch	EOS	1.1 km	MPC · JPL
795065	2007 VM_{306}	—	November 1, 2007	Kitt Peak	Spacewatch	·	1.5 km	MPC · JPL
795066	2007 VL_{313}	—	November 8, 2007	Mount Lemmon	Mount Lemmon Survey	·	2.6 km	MPC · JPL
795067	2007 VK_{318}	—	November 2, 2007	Mount Lemmon	Mount Lemmon Survey	·	730 m	MPC · JPL
795068	2007 VX_{319}	—	October 21, 2007	Catalina	CSS	·	2.1 km	MPC · JPL
795069	2007 VL_{322}	—	October 9, 2007	Mount Lemmon	Mount Lemmon Survey	THM	1.6 km	MPC · JPL
795070	2007 VG_{323}	—	November 2, 2007	Kitt Peak	Spacewatch	·	690 m	MPC · JPL
795071	2007 VY_{330}	—	November 4, 2007	Kitt Peak	Spacewatch	·	2.0 km	MPC · JPL
795072	2007 VJ_{333}	—	December 3, 2007	Catalina	CSS	·	1.2 km	MPC · JPL
795073	2007 VE_{341}	—	November 8, 2007	Mount Lemmon	Mount Lemmon Survey	EOS	1.3 km	MPC · JPL
795074	2007 VE_{342}	—	November 14, 2007	Mount Lemmon	Mount Lemmon Survey	·	2.5 km	MPC · JPL
795075	2007 VF_{345}	—	March 17, 2015	Haleakala	Pan-STARRS 1	·	1.9 km	MPC · JPL
795076	2007 VE_{346}	—	November 5, 2007	Kitt Peak	Spacewatch	EOS	1.2 km	MPC · JPL
795077	2007 VQ_{349}	—	September 16, 2017	Haleakala	Pan-STARRS 1	·	1.5 km	MPC · JPL
795078	2007 VP_{350}	—	January 15, 2018	Haleakala	Pan-STARRS 1	·	1.5 km	MPC · JPL
795079	2007 VR_{353}	—	October 12, 2015	Haleakala	Pan-STARRS 1	·	620 m	MPC · JPL
795080	2007 VW_{355}	—	November 8, 2007	Kitt Peak	Spacewatch	·	1.5 km	MPC · JPL
795081	2007 VN_{358}	—	September 16, 2017	Haleakala	Pan-STARRS 1	·	1.5 km	MPC · JPL
795082	2007 VO_{362}	—	October 18, 2012	Haleakala	Pan-STARRS 1	·	1.3 km	MPC · JPL
795083	2007 VX_{364}	—	November 2, 2007	Kitt Peak	Spacewatch	·	1.7 km	MPC · JPL
795084	2007 VM_{368}	—	November 7, 2007	Kitt Peak	Spacewatch	·	1.4 km	MPC · JPL
795085	2007 VF_{369}	—	November 9, 2007	Mount Lemmon	Mount Lemmon Survey	·	1.3 km	MPC · JPL
795086	2007 VV_{370}	—	November 3, 2007	Kitt Peak	Spacewatch	·	1.4 km	MPC · JPL
795087	2007 VJ_{375}	—	November 8, 2007	Kitt Peak	Spacewatch	·	2.0 km	MPC · JPL
795088	2007 VO_{376}	—	November 1, 2007	Kitt Peak	Spacewatch	·	1.3 km	MPC · JPL
795089	2007 VB_{377}	—	November 8, 2007	Kitt Peak	Spacewatch	KON	1.3 km	MPC · JPL
795090	2007 VO_{379}	—	November 7, 2007	Kitt Peak	Spacewatch	·	970 m	MPC · JPL
795091	2007 VQ_{379}	—	November 2, 2007	Kitt Peak	Spacewatch	·	2.1 km	MPC · JPL
795092	2007 VS_{379}	—	November 3, 2007	Kitt Peak	Spacewatch	DOR	1.4 km	MPC · JPL
795093	2007 VX_{379}	—	November 11, 2007	Mount Lemmon	Mount Lemmon Survey	·	1.6 km	MPC · JPL
795094	2007 VC_{381}	—	November 3, 2007	Mount Lemmon	Mount Lemmon Survey	·	1.3 km	MPC · JPL
795095	2007 VD_{382}	—	November 3, 2007	Mount Lemmon	Mount Lemmon Survey	EOS	1.1 km	MPC · JPL
795096	2007 VF_{382}	—	November 5, 2007	Mount Lemmon	Mount Lemmon Survey	·	1.8 km	MPC · JPL
795097	2007 VS_{382}	—	November 9, 2007	Mount Lemmon	Mount Lemmon Survey	·	1.5 km	MPC · JPL
795098	2007 VS_{383}	—	November 9, 2007	Kitt Peak	Spacewatch	·	1.3 km	MPC · JPL
795099	2007 VU_{383}	—	November 1, 2007	Mount Lemmon	Mount Lemmon Survey	KOR	960 m	MPC · JPL
795100	2007 VK_{384}	—	November 6, 2007	Kitt Peak	Spacewatch	·	2.3 km	MPC · JPL

== 795101–795200 ==
back to top

Designation			Discovery			Properties		Ref
Permanent	Provisional	Named after	Date	Site	Discoverer(s)	Category	Diam.	Ref
795101	2007 VV_{385}	—	November 14, 2007	Kitt Peak	Spacewatch	·	1.7 km	MPC · JPL
795102	2007 VY_{385}	—	November 3, 2007	Mount Lemmon	Mount Lemmon Survey	·	2.0 km	MPC · JPL
795103	2007 VZ_{385}	—	November 4, 2007	Kitt Peak	Spacewatch	EOS	1.1 km	MPC · JPL
795104	2007 VX_{386}	—	November 7, 2007	Kitt Peak	Spacewatch	·	1.3 km	MPC · JPL
795105	2007 WC_{1}	—	November 2, 2007	Catalina	CSS	·	830 m	MPC · JPL
795106	2007 WF_{9}	—	October 21, 2007	Kitt Peak	Spacewatch	·	570 m	MPC · JPL
795107	2007 WO_{13}	—	November 18, 2007	Mount Lemmon	Mount Lemmon Survey	(5)	750 m	MPC · JPL
795108	2007 WD_{24}	—	November 18, 2007	Mount Lemmon	Mount Lemmon Survey	·	2.2 km	MPC · JPL
795109	2007 WA_{26}	—	January 10, 2003	Kitt Peak	Spacewatch	·	1.5 km	MPC · JPL
795110	2007 WV_{27}	—	November 7, 2007	Kitt Peak	Spacewatch	(5)	780 m	MPC · JPL
795111	2007 WV_{34}	—	November 19, 2007	Mount Lemmon	Mount Lemmon Survey	·	1.4 km	MPC · JPL
795112	2007 WC_{39}	—	November 19, 2007	Mount Lemmon	Mount Lemmon Survey	·	1.9 km	MPC · JPL
795113	2007 WF_{46}	—	November 3, 2007	Mount Lemmon	Mount Lemmon Survey	·	790 m	MPC · JPL
795114	2007 WX_{46}	—	November 20, 2007	Mount Lemmon	Mount Lemmon Survey	·	2.3 km	MPC · JPL
795115	2007 WM_{49}	—	November 20, 2007	Mount Lemmon	Mount Lemmon Survey	KOR	1.1 km	MPC · JPL
795116	2007 WQ_{50}	—	November 20, 2007	Mount Lemmon	Mount Lemmon Survey	·	1.6 km	MPC · JPL
795117	2007 WG_{54}	—	November 18, 2007	Mount Lemmon	Mount Lemmon Survey	EOS	1.3 km	MPC · JPL
795118	2007 WF_{60}	—	November 17, 2007	Mount Lemmon	Mount Lemmon Survey	(5)	700 m	MPC · JPL
795119	2007 WR_{65}	—	October 20, 2012	Haleakala	Pan-STARRS 1	·	1.8 km	MPC · JPL
795120	2007 WT_{66}	—	November 17, 2007	Kitt Peak	Spacewatch	·	1.7 km	MPC · JPL
795121	2007 WO_{70}	—	July 30, 2014	Haleakala	Pan-STARRS 1	·	640 m	MPC · JPL
795122	2007 WH_{71}	—	October 25, 2016	Haleakala	Pan-STARRS 1	AGN	790 m	MPC · JPL
795123	2007 WY_{71}	—	November 19, 2007	Kitt Peak	Spacewatch	·	2.0 km	MPC · JPL
795124	2007 WT_{75}	—	November 19, 2007	Kitt Peak	Spacewatch	·	1.8 km	MPC · JPL
795125	2007 WD_{76}	—	November 18, 2007	Kitt Peak	Spacewatch	·	1.7 km	MPC · JPL
795126	2007 WH_{76}	—	November 18, 2007	Kitt Peak	Spacewatch	·	1.1 km	MPC · JPL
795127	2007 XY_{28}	—	December 15, 2007	Kitt Peak	Spacewatch	·	760 m	MPC · JPL
795128	2007 XX_{63}	—	December 3, 2007	Kitt Peak	Spacewatch	·	750 m	MPC · JPL
795129	2007 XW_{65}	—	December 5, 2007	Kitt Peak	Spacewatch	(5)	900 m	MPC · JPL
795130	2007 XJ_{66}	—	December 8, 2012	Mount Lemmon	Mount Lemmon Survey	·	1.7 km	MPC · JPL
795131	2007 XD_{68}	—	January 27, 2017	Haleakala	Pan-STARRS 1	·	990 m	MPC · JPL
795132	2007 XG_{69}	—	December 4, 2007	Mount Lemmon	Mount Lemmon Survey	VER	1.9 km	MPC · JPL
795133	2007 XC_{70}	—	December 4, 2007	Kitt Peak	Spacewatch	·	1.2 km	MPC · JPL
795134	2007 XD_{73}	—	December 15, 2007	Mount Lemmon	Mount Lemmon Survey	·	2.0 km	MPC · JPL
795135	2007 XG_{73}	—	December 5, 2007	Mount Lemmon	Mount Lemmon Survey	·	1.3 km	MPC · JPL
795136	2007 YL_{8}	—	November 19, 2007	Mount Lemmon	Mount Lemmon Survey	·	690 m	MPC · JPL
795137	2007 YG_{20}	—	December 16, 2007	Kitt Peak	Spacewatch	(5)	790 m	MPC · JPL
795138	2007 YQ_{24}	—	December 17, 2007	Mount Lemmon	Mount Lemmon Survey	·	1.7 km	MPC · JPL
795139	2007 YF_{40}	—	December 30, 2007	Kitt Peak	Spacewatch	KON	1.4 km	MPC · JPL
795140	2007 YT_{40}	—	December 30, 2007	Mount Lemmon	Mount Lemmon Survey	(5)	860 m	MPC · JPL
795141	2007 YY_{41}	—	December 30, 2007	Kitt Peak	Spacewatch	BAR	1.1 km	MPC · JPL
795142	2007 YZ_{46}	—	November 12, 2007	Mount Lemmon	Mount Lemmon Survey	·	870 m	MPC · JPL
795143	2007 YR_{58}	—	October 26, 2007	Mount Lemmon	Mount Lemmon Survey	·	2.3 km	MPC · JPL
795144	2007 YY_{62}	—	December 30, 2007	Kitt Peak	Spacewatch	·	1.0 km	MPC · JPL
795145	2007 YA_{70}	—	December 31, 2007	Kitt Peak	Spacewatch	(5)	780 m	MPC · JPL
795146	2007 YF_{71}	—	December 20, 2007	Mount Lemmon	Mount Lemmon Survey	H	590 m	MPC · JPL
795147	2007 YN_{75}	—	February 21, 2003	Palomar Mountain	NEAT	·	1.8 km	MPC · JPL
795148	2007 YR_{79}	—	December 31, 2007	Mount Lemmon	Mount Lemmon Survey	·	2.3 km	MPC · JPL
795149	2007 YF_{80}	—	November 7, 2012	Mount Lemmon	Mount Lemmon Survey	·	1.9 km	MPC · JPL
795150	2007 YG_{85}	—	January 24, 2014	Haleakala	Pan-STARRS 1	·	2.6 km	MPC · JPL
795151	2007 YK_{85}	—	December 18, 2007	Kitt Peak	Spacewatch	EUP	2.5 km	MPC · JPL
795152	2007 YE_{86}	—	October 15, 2012	Kitt Peak	Spacewatch	TEL	950 m	MPC · JPL
795153	2007 YA_{88}	—	February 28, 2014	Haleakala	Pan-STARRS 1	·	1.7 km	MPC · JPL
795154	2007 YB_{89}	—	January 31, 2013	Mount Lemmon	Mount Lemmon Survey	·	1.5 km	MPC · JPL
795155	2007 YK_{93}	—	December 30, 2007	Mount Lemmon	Mount Lemmon Survey	H	470 m	MPC · JPL
795156	2007 YM_{93}	—	December 30, 2007	Mount Lemmon	Mount Lemmon Survey	·	2.2 km	MPC · JPL
795157	2007 YY_{93}	—	December 31, 2007	Kitt Peak	Spacewatch	·	740 m	MPC · JPL
795158	2007 YW_{94}	—	December 18, 2007	Mount Lemmon	Mount Lemmon Survey	·	830 m	MPC · JPL
795159	2007 YB_{95}	—	December 31, 2007	Kitt Peak	Spacewatch	(5)	660 m	MPC · JPL
795160	2007 YH_{95}	—	December 30, 2007	Mount Lemmon	Mount Lemmon Survey	·	860 m	MPC · JPL
795161	2007 YO_{95}	—	December 17, 2007	Mount Lemmon	Mount Lemmon Survey	·	2.3 km	MPC · JPL
795162	2007 YX_{96}	—	December 19, 2007	Mount Lemmon	Mount Lemmon Survey	·	2.4 km	MPC · JPL
795163	2007 YA_{97}	—	December 30, 2007	Kitt Peak	Spacewatch	·	1.5 km	MPC · JPL
795164	2007 YM_{97}	—	December 17, 2007	Kitt Peak	Spacewatch	·	1.5 km	MPC · JPL
795165	2007 YU_{97}	—	December 18, 2007	Kitt Peak	Spacewatch	·	2.0 km	MPC · JPL
795166	2007 YB_{98}	—	December 18, 2007	Mount Lemmon	Mount Lemmon Survey	·	1.0 km	MPC · JPL
795167	2007 YR_{98}	—	December 18, 2007	Mount Lemmon	Mount Lemmon Survey	THB	2.1 km	MPC · JPL
795168	2007 YZ_{98}	—	December 31, 2007	Kitt Peak	Spacewatch	MAR	760 m	MPC · JPL
795169	2008 AF_{10}	—	January 10, 2008	Mount Lemmon	Mount Lemmon Survey	AEO	830 m	MPC · JPL
795170	2008 AW_{15}	—	January 10, 2008	Mount Lemmon	Mount Lemmon Survey	·	1.0 km	MPC · JPL
795171	2008 AR_{26}	—	January 10, 2008	Kitt Peak	Spacewatch	·	2.1 km	MPC · JPL
795172	2008 AY_{28}	—	January 10, 2008	Kitt Peak	Spacewatch	·	950 m	MPC · JPL
795173	2008 AX_{30}	—	October 19, 2007	Mount Lemmon	Mount Lemmon Survey	T_{j} (2.9)	1.7 km	MPC · JPL
795174	2008 AT_{45}	—	January 11, 2008	Kitt Peak	Spacewatch	·	1.2 km	MPC · JPL
795175	2008 AF_{49}	—	January 11, 2008	Kitt Peak	Spacewatch	·	1.3 km	MPC · JPL
795176	2008 AL_{50}	—	December 18, 2007	Mount Lemmon	Mount Lemmon Survey	·	1.0 km	MPC · JPL
795177	2008 AT_{51}	—	January 11, 2008	Kitt Peak	Spacewatch	AGN	730 m	MPC · JPL
795178	2008 AZ_{55}	—	January 11, 2008	Kitt Peak	Spacewatch	·	1.2 km	MPC · JPL
795179	2008 AU_{63}	—	January 11, 2008	Kitt Peak	Spacewatch	·	1.3 km	MPC · JPL
795180	2008 AO_{70}	—	January 12, 2008	Mount Lemmon	Mount Lemmon Survey	·	1.7 km	MPC · JPL
795181	2008 AX_{73}	—	January 10, 2008	Mount Lemmon	Mount Lemmon Survey	·	880 m	MPC · JPL
795182	2008 AH_{78}	—	January 12, 2008	Kitt Peak	Spacewatch	·	750 m	MPC · JPL
795183	2008 AU_{79}	—	December 31, 2007	Kitt Peak	Spacewatch	·	970 m	MPC · JPL
795184	2008 AA_{80}	—	January 12, 2008	Kitt Peak	Spacewatch	·	520 m	MPC · JPL
795185	2008 AV_{80}	—	March 12, 2004	Palomar Mountain	NEAT	·	900 m	MPC · JPL
795186	2008 AD_{81}	—	January 12, 2008	Kitt Peak	Spacewatch	T_{j} (2.98)	2.2 km	MPC · JPL
795187	2008 AG_{89}	—	January 9, 1997	Kitt Peak	Spacewatch	·	2.5 km	MPC · JPL
795188	2008 AE_{95}	—	December 30, 2007	Kitt Peak	Spacewatch	·	1.8 km	MPC · JPL
795189	2008 AA_{96}	—	February 16, 2004	Kitt Peak	Spacewatch	·	880 m	MPC · JPL
795190	2008 AC_{99}	—	January 1, 2008	Kitt Peak	Spacewatch	T_{j} (2.89)	1.9 km	MPC · JPL
795191	2008 AO_{105}	—	December 31, 2007	Kitt Peak	Spacewatch	·	570 m	MPC · JPL
795192	2008 AZ_{115}	—	January 13, 2008	Kitt Peak	Spacewatch	·	880 m	MPC · JPL
795193	2008 AC_{121}	—	January 14, 2008	Kitt Peak	Spacewatch	·	510 m	MPC · JPL
795194	2008 AH_{123}	—	January 6, 2008	Mauna Kea	P. A. Wiegert	·	1.9 km	MPC · JPL
795195	2008 AF_{124}	—	January 6, 2008	Mauna Kea	P. A. Wiegert	·	1.8 km	MPC · JPL
795196	2008 AM_{125}	—	January 6, 2008	Mauna Kea	P. A. Wiegert	·	1.5 km	MPC · JPL
795197	2008 AX_{128}	—	December 18, 2007	Mount Lemmon	Mount Lemmon Survey	critical	860 m	MPC · JPL
795198	2008 AD_{134}	—	January 31, 2008	Mount Lemmon	Mount Lemmon Survey	·	1.9 km	MPC · JPL
795199	2008 AB_{140}	—	January 15, 2008	Mount Lemmon	Mount Lemmon Survey	·	2.3 km	MPC · JPL
795200	2008 AQ_{141}	—	January 11, 2008	Kitt Peak	Spacewatch	·	470 m	MPC · JPL

== 795201–795300 ==
back to top

Designation			Discovery			Properties		Ref
Permanent	Provisional	Named after	Date	Site	Discoverer(s)	Category	Diam.	Ref
795201	2008 AT_{143}	—	January 12, 2008	Mount Lemmon	Mount Lemmon Survey	·	1.0 km	MPC · JPL
795202	2008 AQ_{144}	—	January 15, 2008	Mount Lemmon	Mount Lemmon Survey	TIR	2.1 km	MPC · JPL
795203	2008 AG_{145}	—	January 13, 2008	Mount Lemmon	Mount Lemmon Survey	·	2.0 km	MPC · JPL
795204	2008 AP_{146}	—	January 14, 2008	Kitt Peak	Spacewatch	·	1.5 km	MPC · JPL
795205	2008 AR_{146}	—	January 1, 2008	Kitt Peak	Spacewatch	TIR	1.8 km	MPC · JPL
795206	2008 AT_{146}	—	January 14, 2008	Kitt Peak	Spacewatch	·	2.0 km	MPC · JPL
795207	2008 AL_{148}	—	January 5, 2008	XuYi	PMO NEO Survey Program	·	950 m	MPC · JPL
795208	2008 AL_{149}	—	November 27, 2014	Haleakala	Pan-STARRS 1	3:2	4.1 km	MPC · JPL
795209	2008 AW_{149}	—	January 11, 2008	Kitt Peak	Spacewatch	RAF	620 m	MPC · JPL
795210	2008 AD_{150}	—	January 15, 2008	Mount Lemmon	Mount Lemmon Survey	(5)	750 m	MPC · JPL
795211	2008 AW_{150}	—	January 15, 2008	Kitt Peak	Spacewatch	·	1.5 km	MPC · JPL
795212	2008 AC_{151}	—	January 11, 2008	Kitt Peak	Spacewatch	EOS	1.4 km	MPC · JPL
795213	2008 AS_{151}	—	January 1, 2008	Kitt Peak	Spacewatch	·	2.4 km	MPC · JPL
795214	2008 AW_{153}	—	January 10, 2008	Kitt Peak	Spacewatch	·	1.1 km	MPC · JPL
795215	2008 AE_{154}	—	January 10, 2008	Kitt Peak	Spacewatch	·	940 m	MPC · JPL
795216	2008 AG_{154}	—	January 11, 2008	Kitt Peak	Spacewatch	THM	1.4 km	MPC · JPL
795217	2008 AH_{154}	—	January 1, 2008	Kitt Peak	Spacewatch	·	1.8 km	MPC · JPL
795218	2008 AL_{154}	—	January 12, 2008	Kitt Peak	Spacewatch	·	800 m	MPC · JPL
795219	2008 AB_{155}	—	January 13, 2008	Kitt Peak	Spacewatch	critical	710 m	MPC · JPL
795220	2008 AG_{155}	—	January 10, 2008	Kitt Peak	Spacewatch	·	1.9 km	MPC · JPL
795221	2008 AZ_{156}	—	January 15, 2008	Mount Lemmon	Mount Lemmon Survey	·	900 m	MPC · JPL
795222	2008 AB_{157}	—	January 13, 2008	Mount Lemmon	Mount Lemmon Survey	AGN	740 m	MPC · JPL
795223	2008 AG_{157}	—	January 13, 2008	Mount Lemmon	Mount Lemmon Survey	·	1.0 km	MPC · JPL
795224	2008 AJ_{157}	—	February 10, 2008	Mount Lemmon	Mount Lemmon Survey	MAR	580 m	MPC · JPL
795225	2008 AZ_{159}	—	January 1, 2008	Kitt Peak	Spacewatch	·	1.6 km	MPC · JPL
795226	2008 AA_{160}	—	January 1, 2008	Kitt Peak	Spacewatch	·	900 m	MPC · JPL
795227	2008 BG_{1}	—	December 18, 2007	Mount Lemmon	Mount Lemmon Survey	·	970 m	MPC · JPL
795228	2008 BX_{3}	—	January 16, 2008	Kitt Peak	Spacewatch	·	1.1 km	MPC · JPL
795229	2008 BB_{8}	—	December 19, 2007	Mount Lemmon	Mount Lemmon Survey	·	2.3 km	MPC · JPL
795230	2008 BX_{9}	—	January 16, 2008	Kitt Peak	Spacewatch	·	950 m	MPC · JPL
795231	2008 BQ_{11}	—	January 18, 2008	Mount Lemmon	Mount Lemmon Survey	(5)	830 m	MPC · JPL
795232	2008 BQ_{12}	—	January 18, 2008	Mount Lemmon	Mount Lemmon Survey	·	1.6 km	MPC · JPL
795233	2008 BX_{13}	—	December 31, 2007	Kitt Peak	Spacewatch	LIX	2.4 km	MPC · JPL
795234	2008 BY_{25}	—	January 11, 2008	Kitt Peak	Spacewatch	·	1.2 km	MPC · JPL
795235	2008 BB_{34}	—	January 30, 2008	Kitt Peak	Spacewatch	·	1.2 km	MPC · JPL
795236	2008 BV_{46}	—	January 30, 2008	Mount Lemmon	Mount Lemmon Survey	PHO	680 m	MPC · JPL
795237	2008 BH_{51}	—	January 16, 2008	Kitt Peak	Spacewatch	·	820 m	MPC · JPL
795238	2008 BJ_{55}	—	January 18, 2008	Mount Lemmon	Mount Lemmon Survey	TIR	2.3 km	MPC · JPL
795239	2008 BO_{55}	—	January 30, 2008	Catalina	CSS	·	880 m	MPC · JPL
795240	2008 BY_{56}	—	January 16, 2008	Kitt Peak	Spacewatch	JUN	680 m	MPC · JPL
795241	2008 BT_{57}	—	August 10, 2012	Kitt Peak	Spacewatch	SYL	3.0 km	MPC · JPL
795242	2008 BY_{57}	—	January 20, 2008	Mount Lemmon	Mount Lemmon Survey	·	2.5 km	MPC · JPL
795243	2008 BK_{58}	—	March 28, 2014	Mount Lemmon	Mount Lemmon Survey	·	1.7 km	MPC · JPL
795244	2008 BA_{59}	—	January 18, 2008	Kitt Peak	Spacewatch	·	1.7 km	MPC · JPL
795245	2008 BD_{59}	—	January 16, 2008	Kitt Peak	Spacewatch	·	1.4 km	MPC · JPL
795246	2008 BJ_{59}	—	April 9, 2014	Mount Lemmon	Mount Lemmon Survey	·	1.8 km	MPC · JPL
795247	2008 BB_{60}	—	January 30, 2008	Mount Lemmon	Mount Lemmon Survey	·	1.6 km	MPC · JPL
795248	2008 BY_{60}	—	November 14, 2006	Mount Lemmon	Mount Lemmon Survey	·	1.4 km	MPC · JPL
795249	2008 BD_{61}	—	January 30, 2008	Mount Lemmon	Mount Lemmon Survey	critical	1.1 km	MPC · JPL
795250	2008 BH_{61}	—	January 19, 2008	Mount Lemmon	Mount Lemmon Survey	·	820 m	MPC · JPL
795251	2008 BO_{61}	—	January 19, 2008	Kitt Peak	Spacewatch	·	980 m	MPC · JPL
795252	2008 CG_{3}	—	February 2, 2008	Mount Lemmon	Mount Lemmon Survey	(5)	740 m	MPC · JPL
795253	2008 CL_{35}	—	February 2, 2008	Kitt Peak	Spacewatch	EUP	2.5 km	MPC · JPL
795254	2008 CC_{41}	—	February 2, 2008	Kitt Peak	Spacewatch	LIX	2.1 km	MPC · JPL
795255	2008 CH_{45}	—	February 2, 2008	Kitt Peak	Spacewatch	·	950 m	MPC · JPL
795256	2008 CX_{60}	—	February 7, 2008	Mount Lemmon	Mount Lemmon Survey	·	970 m	MPC · JPL
795257	2008 CW_{74}	—	January 10, 2008	Kitt Peak	Spacewatch	·	1.8 km	MPC · JPL
795258	2008 CG_{78}	—	December 5, 2007	Kitt Peak	Spacewatch	·	780 m	MPC · JPL
795259	2008 CJ_{78}	—	December 31, 2007	Kitt Peak	Spacewatch	·	580 m	MPC · JPL
795260	2008 CD_{79}	—	February 7, 2008	Kitt Peak	Spacewatch	·	2.0 km	MPC · JPL
795261	2008 CF_{81}	—	February 7, 2008	Kitt Peak	Spacewatch	·	1.5 km	MPC · JPL
795262	2008 CQ_{99}	—	February 9, 2008	Kitt Peak	Spacewatch	·	1.6 km	MPC · JPL
795263	2008 CA_{101}	—	February 9, 2008	Mount Lemmon	Mount Lemmon Survey	·	890 m	MPC · JPL
795264	2008 CG_{102}	—	February 9, 2008	Mount Lemmon	Mount Lemmon Survey	·	1.3 km	MPC · JPL
795265	2008 CN_{102}	—	February 9, 2008	Kitt Peak	Spacewatch	·	1.9 km	MPC · JPL
795266	2008 CQ_{102}	—	February 9, 2008	Mount Lemmon	Mount Lemmon Survey	·	1.4 km	MPC · JPL
795267	2008 CM_{107}	—	February 2, 2008	Kitt Peak	Spacewatch	·	580 m	MPC · JPL
795268	2008 CE_{113}	—	February 10, 2008	Kitt Peak	Spacewatch	·	1.9 km	MPC · JPL
795269	2008 CG_{121}	—	December 18, 2007	Kitt Peak	Spacewatch	·	770 m	MPC · JPL
795270	2008 CP_{125}	—	January 30, 2008	Mount Lemmon	Mount Lemmon Survey	·	930 m	MPC · JPL
795271	2008 CB_{126}	—	February 8, 2008	Kitt Peak	Spacewatch	·	1.8 km	MPC · JPL
795272	2008 CZ_{129}	—	February 8, 2008	Kitt Peak	Spacewatch	·	1.8 km	MPC · JPL
795273	2008 CP_{130}	—	February 8, 2008	Kitt Peak	Spacewatch	THB	1.9 km	MPC · JPL
795274	2008 CQ_{131}	—	February 8, 2008	Kitt Peak	Spacewatch	·	870 m	MPC · JPL
795275	2008 CY_{134}	—	February 8, 2008	Mount Lemmon	Mount Lemmon Survey	3:2	3.5 km	MPC · JPL
795276	2008 CP_{139}	—	February 8, 2008	Mount Lemmon	Mount Lemmon Survey	EOS	1.4 km	MPC · JPL
795277	2008 CP_{144}	—	November 26, 2019	Haleakala	Pan-STARRS 1	·	830 m	MPC · JPL
795278	2008 CA_{147}	—	February 9, 2008	Kitt Peak	Spacewatch	·	2.1 km	MPC · JPL
795279	2008 CE_{150}	—	February 9, 2008	Kitt Peak	Spacewatch	·	1.1 km	MPC · JPL
795280	2008 CP_{151}	—	February 9, 2008	Kitt Peak	Spacewatch	·	2.0 km	MPC · JPL
795281	2008 CH_{169}	—	February 12, 2008	Mount Lemmon	Mount Lemmon Survey	KON	1.5 km	MPC · JPL
795282	2008 CW_{171}	—	February 12, 2008	Mount Lemmon	Mount Lemmon Survey	EOS	1.3 km	MPC · JPL
795283	2008 CL_{183}	—	February 12, 2008	Mount Lemmon	Mount Lemmon Survey	·	790 m	MPC · JPL
795284	2008 CT_{188}	—	February 12, 2008	Catalina	CSS	·	700 m	MPC · JPL
795285	2008 CL_{192}	—	February 3, 2008	Catalina	CSS	T_{j} (2.98) · critical	2.3 km	MPC · JPL
795286	2008 CF_{206}	—	February 8, 2008	Kitt Peak	Spacewatch	GEF	800 m	MPC · JPL
795287	2008 CB_{213}	—	February 9, 2008	Kitt Peak	Spacewatch	JUN	760 m	MPC · JPL
795288	2008 CE_{221}	—	February 13, 2008	Mount Lemmon	Mount Lemmon Survey	·	570 m	MPC · JPL
795289	2008 CN_{222}	—	July 27, 2017	Haleakala	Pan-STARRS 1	·	2.4 km	MPC · JPL
795290	2008 CE_{224}	—	April 15, 2013	Haleakala	Pan-STARRS 1	·	920 m	MPC · JPL
795291	2008 CO_{225}	—	December 29, 2011	Mount Lemmon	Mount Lemmon Survey	·	1.3 km	MPC · JPL
795292	2008 CV_{225}	—	February 2, 2008	Kitt Peak	Spacewatch	·	1.9 km	MPC · JPL
795293	2008 CD_{227}	—	February 14, 2013	Haleakala	Pan-STARRS 1	·	1.4 km	MPC · JPL
795294	2008 CR_{230}	—	October 16, 2017	Mount Lemmon	Mount Lemmon Survey	·	1.9 km	MPC · JPL
795295	2008 CL_{231}	—	December 29, 2011	Mount Lemmon	Mount Lemmon Survey	(5)	900 m	MPC · JPL
795296	2008 CP_{231}	—	December 29, 2014	Haleakala	Pan-STARRS 1	PHO	720 m	MPC · JPL
795297	2008 CX_{231}	—	February 13, 2008	Kitt Peak	Spacewatch	·	1.8 km	MPC · JPL
795298	2008 CQ_{232}	—	January 11, 2008	Mount Lemmon	Mount Lemmon Survey	TIR	1.7 km	MPC · JPL
795299	2008 CD_{234}	—	September 2, 2010	Mount Lemmon	Mount Lemmon Survey	·	1.4 km	MPC · JPL
795300	2008 CA_{235}	—	September 24, 2017	Mount Lemmon	Mount Lemmon Survey	·	2.0 km	MPC · JPL

== 795301–795400 ==
back to top

Designation			Discovery			Properties		Ref
Permanent	Provisional	Named after	Date	Site	Discoverer(s)	Category	Diam.	Ref
795301	2008 CB_{235}	—	September 10, 2015	Haleakala	Pan-STARRS 1	HOF	1.6 km	MPC · JPL
795302	2008 CO_{235}	—	February 12, 2008	Kitt Peak	Spacewatch	·	1.3 km	MPC · JPL
795303	2008 CA_{238}	—	February 10, 2008	Kitt Peak	Spacewatch	·	2.4 km	MPC · JPL
795304	2008 CP_{238}	—	February 10, 2008	Kitt Peak	Spacewatch	·	1.1 km	MPC · JPL
795305	2008 CL_{240}	—	February 10, 2008	Kitt Peak	Spacewatch	·	2.1 km	MPC · JPL
795306	2008 CJ_{241}	—	February 10, 2008	Kitt Peak	Spacewatch	·	1.0 km	MPC · JPL
795307	2008 CP_{241}	—	February 10, 2008	Kitt Peak	Spacewatch	VER	2.1 km	MPC · JPL
795308	2008 CZ_{241}	—	February 13, 2008	Kitt Peak	Spacewatch	LIX	2.5 km	MPC · JPL
795309	2008 CP_{242}	—	February 13, 2008	Mount Lemmon	Mount Lemmon Survey	·	1.9 km	MPC · JPL
795310	2008 CD_{243}	—	February 2, 2008	Mount Lemmon	Mount Lemmon Survey	BRA	1.1 km	MPC · JPL
795311	2008 CR_{244}	—	February 13, 2008	Mount Lemmon	Mount Lemmon Survey	·	960 m	MPC · JPL
795312	2008 CS_{244}	—	February 3, 2008	Mount Lemmon	Mount Lemmon Survey	·	860 m	MPC · JPL
795313	2008 CD_{248}	—	February 13, 2008	Kitt Peak	Spacewatch	·	2.1 km	MPC · JPL
795314	2008 CD_{250}	—	February 8, 2008	Kitt Peak	Spacewatch	·	2.1 km	MPC · JPL
795315	2008 CT_{250}	—	February 7, 2008	Kitt Peak	Spacewatch	·	1.1 km	MPC · JPL
795316	2008 CD_{251}	—	February 10, 2008	Kitt Peak	Spacewatch	T_{j} (2.96)	2.1 km	MPC · JPL
795317	2008 CL_{251}	—	February 8, 2008	Mount Lemmon	Mount Lemmon Survey	·	2.1 km	MPC · JPL
795318	2008 CZ_{252}	—	February 9, 2008	Mount Lemmon	Mount Lemmon Survey	·	2.3 km	MPC · JPL
795319	2008 CC_{253}	—	February 7, 2008	Mount Lemmon	Mount Lemmon Survey	·	2.0 km	MPC · JPL
795320	2008 DL_{8}	—	February 7, 2008	Kitt Peak	Spacewatch	LIX	2.3 km	MPC · JPL
795321	2008 DQ_{20}	—	February 28, 2008	Mount Lemmon	Mount Lemmon Survey	RAF	780 m	MPC · JPL
795322	2008 DH_{23}	—	February 29, 2008	Kitt Peak	Spacewatch	AMO	400 m	MPC · JPL
795323	2008 DK_{29}	—	January 30, 2008	Mount Lemmon	Mount Lemmon Survey	·	1.2 km	MPC · JPL
795324	2008 DK_{31}	—	January 19, 2008	Kitt Peak	Spacewatch	BRG	910 m	MPC · JPL
795325	2008 DM_{31}	—	February 2, 2008	Mount Lemmon	Mount Lemmon Survey	·	1.8 km	MPC · JPL
795326	2008 DB_{40}	—	February 27, 2008	Mount Lemmon	Mount Lemmon Survey	T_{j} (2.96)	2.3 km	MPC · JPL
795327	2008 DY_{40}	—	February 28, 2008	Kitt Peak	Spacewatch	·	1.3 km	MPC · JPL
795328	2008 DS_{41}	—	February 9, 2008	Kitt Peak	Spacewatch	·	900 m	MPC · JPL
795329	2008 DC_{42}	—	February 9, 2008	Kitt Peak	Spacewatch	THM	1.7 km	MPC · JPL
795330	2008 DS_{42}	—	February 28, 2008	Kitt Peak	Spacewatch	·	1.9 km	MPC · JPL
795331	2008 DQ_{50}	—	February 29, 2008	Kitt Peak	Spacewatch	·	2.6 km	MPC · JPL
795332	2008 DA_{61}	—	February 28, 2008	Mount Lemmon	Mount Lemmon Survey	·	860 m	MPC · JPL
795333	2008 DV_{62}	—	February 28, 2008	Mount Lemmon	Mount Lemmon Survey	KOR	1.0 km	MPC · JPL
795334	2008 DP_{63}	—	February 2, 2008	Kitt Peak	Spacewatch	·	1.9 km	MPC · JPL
795335	2008 DK_{65}	—	February 10, 2008	Mount Lemmon	Mount Lemmon Survey	(5)	760 m	MPC · JPL
795336	2008 DJ_{71}	—	February 2, 2008	Mount Lemmon	Mount Lemmon Survey	·	1.2 km	MPC · JPL
795337	2008 DQ_{74}	—	February 12, 2008	Kitt Peak	Spacewatch	·	990 m	MPC · JPL
795338	2008 DY_{76}	—	February 28, 2008	Mount Lemmon	Mount Lemmon Survey	LIX	2.3 km	MPC · JPL
795339	2008 DD_{78}	—	February 28, 2008	Mount Lemmon	Mount Lemmon Survey	·	2.7 km	MPC · JPL
795340	2008 DV_{81}	—	February 28, 2008	Kitt Peak	Spacewatch	·	1.0 km	MPC · JPL
795341	2008 DY_{82}	—	February 28, 2008	Mount Lemmon	Mount Lemmon Survey	EUN	820 m	MPC · JPL
795342	2008 DA_{85}	—	February 29, 2008	Kitt Peak	Spacewatch	·	610 m	MPC · JPL
795343	2008 DC_{86}	—	February 26, 2008	Mount Lemmon	Mount Lemmon Survey	·	640 m	MPC · JPL
795344	2008 DT_{93}	—	February 29, 2008	Mount Lemmon	Mount Lemmon Survey	·	1.0 km	MPC · JPL
795345	2008 DZ_{94}	—	September 26, 2011	Haleakala	Pan-STARRS 1	THM	1.8 km	MPC · JPL
795346	2008 DV_{95}	—	January 17, 2013	Haleakala	Pan-STARRS 1	·	1.4 km	MPC · JPL
795347	2008 DW_{95}	—	March 10, 2016	Mount Lemmon	Mount Lemmon Survey	3:2	4.2 km	MPC · JPL
795348	2008 DX_{95}	—	February 28, 2008	Mount Lemmon	Mount Lemmon Survey	·	2.4 km	MPC · JPL
795349	2008 DD_{96}	—	February 26, 2008	Kitt Peak	Spacewatch	·	1.9 km	MPC · JPL
795350	2008 DS_{96}	—	February 28, 2008	Mount Lemmon	Mount Lemmon Survey	·	680 m	MPC · JPL
795351	2008 DW_{96}	—	February 28, 2008	Kitt Peak	Spacewatch	THM	1.5 km	MPC · JPL
795352	2008 DL_{97}	—	February 28, 2008	Mount Lemmon	Mount Lemmon Survey	·	1.1 km	MPC · JPL
795353	2008 DV_{97}	—	February 28, 2008	Mount Lemmon	Mount Lemmon Survey	THB	2.3 km	MPC · JPL
795354	2008 DE_{99}	—	February 28, 2008	Kitt Peak	Spacewatch	·	2.1 km	MPC · JPL
795355	2008 DS_{99}	—	February 29, 2008	Mount Lemmon	Mount Lemmon Survey	·	2.0 km	MPC · JPL
795356	2008 DX_{99}	—	February 12, 2008	Kitt Peak	Spacewatch	HNS	750 m	MPC · JPL
795357	2008 DA_{100}	—	February 29, 2008	Kitt Peak	Spacewatch	·	2.4 km	MPC · JPL
795358	2008 DH_{100}	—	February 26, 2008	Mount Lemmon	Mount Lemmon Survey	·	1.9 km	MPC · JPL
795359	2008 EX_{14}	—	March 1, 2008	Kitt Peak	Spacewatch	·	870 m	MPC · JPL
795360	2008 EN_{23}	—	February 11, 2008	Kitt Peak	Spacewatch	·	1.2 km	MPC · JPL
795361	2008 EM_{26}	—	February 12, 2008	Kitt Peak	Spacewatch	·	1.7 km	MPC · JPL
795362	2008 EZ_{36}	—	December 18, 2007	Mount Lemmon	Mount Lemmon Survey	·	430 m	MPC · JPL
795363	2008 EO_{37}	—	January 19, 2008	Kitt Peak	Spacewatch	RAF	700 m	MPC · JPL
795364	2008 ER_{40}	—	February 29, 2008	Kitt Peak	Spacewatch	·	1.2 km	MPC · JPL
795365	2008 EB_{49}	—	February 13, 2008	Kitt Peak	Spacewatch	·	1.0 km	MPC · JPL
795366	2008 EF_{49}	—	February 28, 2008	Mount Lemmon	Mount Lemmon Survey	·	750 m	MPC · JPL
795367	2008 EX_{49}	—	March 6, 2008	Kitt Peak	Spacewatch	·	1.9 km	MPC · JPL
795368	2008 EX_{51}	—	January 17, 2013	Haleakala	Pan-STARRS 1	EOS	1.4 km	MPC · JPL
795369	2008 ES_{53}	—	March 6, 2008	Mount Lemmon	Mount Lemmon Survey	·	2.0 km	MPC · JPL
795370	2008 EV_{56}	—	March 7, 2008	Catalina	CSS	T_{j} (2.9)	2.7 km	MPC · JPL
795371	2008 EJ_{57}	—	May 14, 2004	Kitt Peak	Spacewatch	·	820 m	MPC · JPL
795372	2008 EP_{62}	—	March 9, 2008	Mount Lemmon	Mount Lemmon Survey	·	2.2 km	MPC · JPL
795373	2008 ET_{71}	—	March 6, 2008	Mount Lemmon	Mount Lemmon Survey	T_{j} (2.99)	2.5 km	MPC · JPL
795374	2008 EC_{76}	—	March 7, 2008	Kitt Peak	Spacewatch	·	2.0 km	MPC · JPL
795375	2008 EJ_{77}	—	March 7, 2008	Kitt Peak	Spacewatch	·	970 m	MPC · JPL
795376	2008 EZ_{78}	—	February 13, 2008	Mount Lemmon	Mount Lemmon Survey	·	990 m	MPC · JPL
795377	2008 EG_{80}	—	March 9, 2008	Kitt Peak	Spacewatch	·	1.9 km	MPC · JPL
795378	2008 EM_{85}	—	March 14, 2008	Socorro	LINEAR	APO	410 m	MPC · JPL
795379	2008 EJ_{91}	—	February 3, 2008	Catalina	CSS	·	1.3 km	MPC · JPL
795380	2008 EC_{101}	—	March 5, 2008	Mount Lemmon	Mount Lemmon Survey	EUN	740 m	MPC · JPL
795381	2008 EV_{101}	—	February 11, 2008	Mount Lemmon	Mount Lemmon Survey	·	920 m	MPC · JPL
795382	2008 EY_{101}	—	March 5, 2008	Mount Lemmon	Mount Lemmon Survey	AGN	850 m	MPC · JPL
795383	2008 EL_{103}	—	March 5, 2008	Mount Lemmon	Mount Lemmon Survey	·	680 m	MPC · JPL
795384	2008 EA_{104}	—	March 5, 2008	Mount Lemmon	Mount Lemmon Survey	·	2.4 km	MPC · JPL
795385	2008 EO_{105}	—	March 6, 2008	Mount Lemmon	Mount Lemmon Survey	·	2.2 km	MPC · JPL
795386	2008 EG_{110}	—	February 7, 2008	Mount Lemmon	Mount Lemmon Survey	·	1.9 km	MPC · JPL
795387	2008 EJ_{110}	—	March 8, 2008	Mount Lemmon	Mount Lemmon Survey	·	1.4 km	MPC · JPL
795388	2008 EN_{118}	—	February 13, 2008	Mount Lemmon	Mount Lemmon Survey	·	900 m	MPC · JPL
795389	2008 EF_{119}	—	February 12, 2008	Mount Lemmon	Mount Lemmon Survey	·	2.1 km	MPC · JPL
795390	2008 EA_{120}	—	February 10, 2008	Mount Lemmon	Mount Lemmon Survey	·	590 m	MPC · JPL
795391	2008 EM_{122}	—	March 9, 2008	Kitt Peak	Spacewatch	·	2.0 km	MPC · JPL
795392	2008 EM_{124}	—	March 10, 2008	Mount Lemmon	Mount Lemmon Survey	·	1.9 km	MPC · JPL
795393	2008 EA_{132}	—	March 3, 2008	Kitt Peak	Spacewatch	·	620 m	MPC · JPL
795394	2008 EM_{138}	—	March 11, 2008	Mount Lemmon	Mount Lemmon Survey	TIR	1.7 km	MPC · JPL
795395	2008 EQ_{140}	—	March 12, 2008	Kitt Peak	Spacewatch	·	2.2 km	MPC · JPL
795396	2008 EM_{160}	—	March 8, 2008	Kitt Peak	Spacewatch	EUP	2.4 km	MPC · JPL
795397	2008 EZ_{170}	—	September 11, 2016	Mount Lemmon	Mount Lemmon Survey	·	2.1 km	MPC · JPL
795398	2008 EB_{174}	—	March 10, 2008	Kitt Peak	Spacewatch	THB	1.9 km	MPC · JPL
795399	2008 EP_{177}	—	March 2, 2008	Kitt Peak	Spacewatch	·	1.2 km	MPC · JPL
795400	2008 EL_{178}	—	March 6, 2008	Mount Lemmon	Mount Lemmon Survey	·	780 m	MPC · JPL

== 795401–795500 ==
back to top

Designation			Discovery			Properties		Ref
Permanent	Provisional	Named after	Date	Site	Discoverer(s)	Category	Diam.	Ref
795401	2008 EA_{179}	—	January 19, 2012	Haleakala	Pan-STARRS 1	·	980 m	MPC · JPL
795402	2008 EE_{180}	—	January 19, 2012	Mount Lemmon	Mount Lemmon Survey	(194)	990 m	MPC · JPL
795403	2008 EK_{183}	—	March 7, 2008	Mount Lemmon	Mount Lemmon Survey	·	1.6 km	MPC · JPL
795404	2008 EE_{185}	—	March 8, 2008	Mount Lemmon	Mount Lemmon Survey	·	1.0 km	MPC · JPL
795405	2008 EG_{185}	—	March 11, 2008	Kitt Peak	Spacewatch	THB	1.8 km	MPC · JPL
795406	2008 EH_{185}	—	March 11, 2008	Kitt Peak	Spacewatch	·	2.1 km	MPC · JPL
795407	2008 ES_{187}	—	December 23, 2012	Haleakala	Pan-STARRS 1	·	2.2 km	MPC · JPL
795408	2008 ED_{189}	—	March 8, 2008	Mount Lemmon	Mount Lemmon Survey	THM	1.7 km	MPC · JPL
795409	2008 ER_{189}	—	December 23, 2012	Haleakala	Pan-STARRS 1	·	1.9 km	MPC · JPL
795410	2008 EZ_{190}	—	March 6, 2008	Mount Lemmon	Mount Lemmon Survey	·	2.4 km	MPC · JPL
795411	2008 ED_{192}	—	March 1, 2008	Kitt Peak	Spacewatch	·	1.3 km	MPC · JPL
795412	2008 EZ_{193}	—	March 10, 2008	Mount Lemmon	Mount Lemmon Survey	·	1.1 km	MPC · JPL
795413	2008 EX_{194}	—	March 8, 2008	Mount Lemmon	Mount Lemmon Survey	·	800 m	MPC · JPL
795414	2008 EK_{195}	—	March 13, 2008	Mount Lemmon	Mount Lemmon Survey	·	2.1 km	MPC · JPL
795415	2008 EN_{195}	—	March 8, 2008	Mount Lemmon	Mount Lemmon Survey	·	1.7 km	MPC · JPL
795416	2008 EK_{196}	—	March 10, 2008	Kitt Peak	Spacewatch	·	2.3 km	MPC · JPL
795417	2008 ER_{196}	—	March 10, 2008	Kitt Peak	Spacewatch	·	980 m	MPC · JPL
795418	2008 EZ_{196}	—	March 8, 2008	Kitt Peak	Spacewatch	·	1.0 km	MPC · JPL
795419	2008 EL_{198}	—	March 5, 2008	Mount Lemmon	Mount Lemmon Survey	·	1.1 km	MPC · JPL
795420	2008 EQ_{198}	—	March 11, 2008	Kitt Peak	Spacewatch	·	2.1 km	MPC · JPL
795421	2008 EC_{199}	—	March 5, 2008	Mount Lemmon	Mount Lemmon Survey	·	1.3 km	MPC · JPL
795422	2008 EG_{199}	—	March 11, 2008	Mount Lemmon	Mount Lemmon Survey	·	2.1 km	MPC · JPL
795423	2008 EH_{199}	—	March 10, 2008	Kitt Peak	Spacewatch	·	2.2 km	MPC · JPL
795424	2008 FS_{1}	—	February 12, 2008	Kitt Peak	Spacewatch	·	2.2 km	MPC · JPL
795425	2008 FR_{2}	—	April 21, 2004	Campo Imperatore	CINEOS	·	790 m	MPC · JPL
795426	2008 FD_{10}	—	April 1, 2003	Sacramento Peak	SDSS	·	2.2 km	MPC · JPL
795427	2008 FL_{16}	—	March 27, 2008	Kitt Peak	Spacewatch	THM	1.7 km	MPC · JPL
795428	2008 FD_{17}	—	March 8, 2008	Mount Lemmon	Mount Lemmon Survey	·	1.1 km	MPC · JPL
795429	2008 FW_{17}	—	March 8, 2008	Mount Lemmon	Mount Lemmon Survey	THM	1.6 km	MPC · JPL
795430	2008 FQ_{18}	—	March 27, 2008	Mount Lemmon	Mount Lemmon Survey	·	810 m	MPC · JPL
795431	2008 FL_{20}	—	March 27, 2008	Mount Lemmon	Mount Lemmon Survey	VER	1.8 km	MPC · JPL
795432	2008 FY_{24}	—	March 6, 2008	Mount Lemmon	Mount Lemmon Survey	LIX · critical	2.2 km	MPC · JPL
795433	2008 FB_{26}	—	March 27, 2008	Mount Lemmon	Mount Lemmon Survey	3:2	3.4 km	MPC · JPL
795434	2008 FG_{31}	—	February 12, 2008	Kitt Peak	Spacewatch	·	1.7 km	MPC · JPL
795435	2008 FJ_{35}	—	March 28, 2008	Mount Lemmon	Mount Lemmon Survey	·	810 m	MPC · JPL
795436	2008 FR_{35}	—	March 28, 2008	Mount Lemmon	Mount Lemmon Survey	·	940 m	MPC · JPL
795437	2008 FC_{46}	—	March 11, 2008	Mount Lemmon	Mount Lemmon Survey	T_{j} (2.98)	2.0 km	MPC · JPL
795438	2008 FF_{46}	—	March 28, 2008	Mount Lemmon	Mount Lemmon Survey	·	950 m	MPC · JPL
795439	2008 FQ_{46}	—	March 28, 2008	Mount Lemmon	Mount Lemmon Survey	·	920 m	MPC · JPL
795440	2008 FW_{47}	—	March 28, 2008	Mount Lemmon	Mount Lemmon Survey	·	840 m	MPC · JPL
795441	2008 FK_{48}	—	March 28, 2008	Mount Lemmon	Mount Lemmon Survey	·	1.3 km	MPC · JPL
795442	2008 FN_{48}	—	March 28, 2008	Mount Lemmon	Mount Lemmon Survey	·	1.9 km	MPC · JPL
795443	2008 FB_{49}	—	March 28, 2008	Mount Lemmon	Mount Lemmon Survey	MAR	580 m	MPC · JPL
795444	2008 FL_{50}	—	March 12, 2008	Mount Lemmon	Mount Lemmon Survey	·	1.0 km	MPC · JPL
795445	2008 FK_{51}	—	March 28, 2008	Mount Lemmon	Mount Lemmon Survey	·	1.6 km	MPC · JPL
795446	2008 FR_{51}	—	March 28, 2008	Mount Lemmon	Mount Lemmon Survey	·	1.1 km	MPC · JPL
795447	2008 FA_{63}	—	March 27, 2008	Kitt Peak	Spacewatch	LIX	2.5 km	MPC · JPL
795448	2008 FD_{73}	—	March 30, 2008	Kitt Peak	Spacewatch	·	1.1 km	MPC · JPL
795449	2008 FS_{79}	—	February 9, 2008	Mount Lemmon	Mount Lemmon Survey	·	960 m	MPC · JPL
795450	2008 FZ_{85}	—	February 28, 2008	Kitt Peak	Spacewatch	·	2.2 km	MPC · JPL
795451	2008 FO_{86}	—	March 28, 2008	Mount Lemmon	Mount Lemmon Survey	THM	1.9 km	MPC · JPL
795452	2008 FM_{89}	—	January 14, 2008	Kitt Peak	Spacewatch	·	1.9 km	MPC · JPL
795453	2008 FY_{91}	—	March 29, 2008	Mount Lemmon	Mount Lemmon Survey	KOR	1.1 km	MPC · JPL
795454	2008 FY_{97}	—	March 30, 2008	Kitt Peak	Spacewatch	critical	980 m	MPC · JPL
795455	2008 FE_{99}	—	March 30, 2008	Kitt Peak	Spacewatch	·	2.4 km	MPC · JPL
795456	2008 FQ_{100}	—	March 30, 2008	Kitt Peak	Spacewatch	·	1.1 km	MPC · JPL
795457	2008 FN_{105}	—	March 10, 2008	Kitt Peak	Spacewatch	·	2.4 km	MPC · JPL
795458	2008 FM_{108}	—	March 11, 2008	Kitt Peak	Spacewatch	MIS	1.8 km	MPC · JPL
795459	2008 FK_{118}	—	March 31, 2008	Mount Lemmon	Mount Lemmon Survey	·	900 m	MPC · JPL
795460	2008 FF_{119}	—	March 11, 2008	Mount Lemmon	Mount Lemmon Survey	·	2.2 km	MPC · JPL
795461	2008 FS_{119}	—	March 31, 2008	Mount Lemmon	Mount Lemmon Survey	·	1.0 km	MPC · JPL
795462	2008 FO_{121}	—	March 31, 2008	Mount Lemmon	Mount Lemmon Survey	MAR	710 m	MPC · JPL
795463	2008 FQ_{121}	—	March 31, 2008	Mount Lemmon	Mount Lemmon Survey	·	1.2 km	MPC · JPL
795464	2008 FU_{123}	—	March 29, 2008	Kitt Peak	Spacewatch	·	1.3 km	MPC · JPL
795465	2008 FW_{129}	—	March 27, 2008	Kitt Peak	Spacewatch	·	1.0 km	MPC · JPL
795466	2008 FD_{134}	—	February 10, 2008	Kitt Peak	Spacewatch	·	2.1 km	MPC · JPL
795467	2008 FQ_{138}	—	March 31, 2008	Mount Lemmon	Mount Lemmon Survey	·	1.9 km	MPC · JPL
795468	2008 FP_{140}	—	October 2, 2013	Haleakala	Pan-STARRS 1	·	490 m	MPC · JPL
795469	2008 FQ_{140}	—	March 29, 2008	Kitt Peak	Spacewatch	·	2.0 km	MPC · JPL
795470	2008 FL_{141}	—	March 29, 2008	Mount Lemmon	Mount Lemmon Survey	BAR	1.1 km	MPC · JPL
795471	2008 FX_{142}	—	December 14, 2017	Haleakala	Pan-STARRS 1	·	2.0 km	MPC · JPL
795472	2008 FR_{145}	—	March 27, 2008	Kitt Peak	Spacewatch	·	1.4 km	MPC · JPL
795473	2008 FT_{145}	—	March 31, 2008	Mount Lemmon	Mount Lemmon Survey	·	2.0 km	MPC · JPL
795474	2008 FS_{146}	—	March 27, 2008	Mount Lemmon	Mount Lemmon Survey	·	2.3 km	MPC · JPL
795475	2008 FF_{147}	—	March 27, 2008	Mount Lemmon	Mount Lemmon Survey	·	1.4 km	MPC · JPL
795476	2008 FW_{147}	—	March 31, 2008	Mount Lemmon	Mount Lemmon Survey	BAR	880 m	MPC · JPL
795477	2008 FY_{147}	—	March 28, 2008	Mount Lemmon	Mount Lemmon Survey	·	1 km	MPC · JPL
795478	2008 FP_{149}	—	March 31, 2008	Mount Lemmon	Mount Lemmon Survey	·	1.3 km	MPC · JPL
795479	2008 FR_{150}	—	March 27, 2008	Mount Lemmon	Mount Lemmon Survey	·	1.0 km	MPC · JPL
795480	2008 FT_{150}	—	March 31, 2008	Mount Lemmon	Mount Lemmon Survey	·	1.7 km	MPC · JPL
795481	2008 FU_{150}	—	March 29, 2008	Kitt Peak	Spacewatch	THB	2.0 km	MPC · JPL
795482	2008 GP_{8}	—	April 1, 2008	Mount Lemmon	Mount Lemmon Survey	·	2.2 km	MPC · JPL
795483	2008 GX_{12}	—	April 1, 2008	Mount Lemmon	Mount Lemmon Survey	·	1.8 km	MPC · JPL
795484	2008 GV_{14}	—	March 15, 2008	Mount Lemmon	Mount Lemmon Survey	ADE	1.2 km	MPC · JPL
795485	2008 GM_{24}	—	April 1, 2008	Mount Lemmon	Mount Lemmon Survey	·	820 m	MPC · JPL
795486	2008 GX_{27}	—	March 1, 2008	Kitt Peak	Spacewatch	·	1.8 km	MPC · JPL
795487	2008 GZ_{27}	—	April 3, 2008	Mount Lemmon	Mount Lemmon Survey	EOS	1.3 km	MPC · JPL
795488	2008 GT_{36}	—	April 3, 2008	Kitt Peak	Spacewatch	·	1.1 km	MPC · JPL
795489	2008 GA_{40}	—	February 28, 2008	Mount Lemmon	Mount Lemmon Survey	·	1.8 km	MPC · JPL
795490	2008 GW_{43}	—	March 11, 2008	Kitt Peak	Spacewatch	·	1.2 km	MPC · JPL
795491	2008 GZ_{45}	—	March 27, 2008	Kitt Peak	Spacewatch	·	1.6 km	MPC · JPL
795492	2008 GK_{49}	—	March 12, 2008	Kitt Peak	Spacewatch	·	1.0 km	MPC · JPL
795493	2008 GR_{51}	—	April 5, 2008	Mount Lemmon	Mount Lemmon Survey	VER	1.8 km	MPC · JPL
795494	2008 GX_{54}	—	April 5, 2008	Mount Lemmon	Mount Lemmon Survey	LIX	2.5 km	MPC · JPL
795495	2008 GJ_{56}	—	April 5, 2008	Mount Lemmon	Mount Lemmon Survey	·	1.1 km	MPC · JPL
795496	2008 GG_{58}	—	April 5, 2008	Mount Lemmon	Mount Lemmon Survey	LIX	2.4 km	MPC · JPL
795497	2008 GW_{58}	—	April 5, 2008	Mount Lemmon	Mount Lemmon Survey	THM	1.7 km	MPC · JPL
795498	2008 GB_{59}	—	April 5, 2008	Mount Lemmon	Mount Lemmon Survey	·	2.0 km	MPC · JPL
795499	2008 GH_{61}	—	April 5, 2008	Mount Lemmon	Mount Lemmon Survey	·	2.2 km	MPC · JPL
795500	2008 GH_{71}	—	April 7, 2008	Mount Lemmon	Mount Lemmon Survey	(194)	970 m	MPC · JPL

== 795501–795600 ==
back to top

Designation			Discovery			Properties		Ref
Permanent	Provisional	Named after	Date	Site	Discoverer(s)	Category	Diam.	Ref
795501	2008 GS_{71}	—	February 13, 2002	Kitt Peak	Spacewatch	·	2.1 km	MPC · JPL
795502	2008 GM_{72}	—	April 7, 2008	Mount Lemmon	Mount Lemmon Survey	·	1.4 km	MPC · JPL
795503	2008 GM_{79}	—	March 30, 2008	Kitt Peak	Spacewatch	·	1.2 km	MPC · JPL
795504	2008 GT_{81}	—	February 27, 2008	Mount Lemmon	Mount Lemmon Survey	·	510 m	MPC · JPL
795505	2008 GJ_{87}	—	April 1, 2008	Kitt Peak	Spacewatch	THB	2.1 km	MPC · JPL
795506	2008 GA_{90}	—	March 29, 2008	Mount Lemmon	Mount Lemmon Survey	THM	2.0 km	MPC · JPL
795507	2008 GB_{92}	—	March 29, 2008	Kitt Peak	Spacewatch	·	990 m	MPC · JPL
795508	2008 GV_{94}	—	April 7, 2008	Mount Lemmon	Mount Lemmon Survey	·	570 m	MPC · JPL
795509	2008 GE_{96}	—	March 28, 2008	Kitt Peak	Spacewatch	·	2.8 km	MPC · JPL
795510	2008 GJ_{101}	—	April 10, 2008	Markleeville	W. G. Dillon, D. Wells	critical	980 m	MPC · JPL
795511	2008 GD_{104}	—	March 29, 2008	Mount Lemmon	Mount Lemmon Survey	·	1.9 km	MPC · JPL
795512	2008 GA_{107}	—	March 11, 2008	Mount Lemmon	Mount Lemmon Survey	·	1.2 km	MPC · JPL
795513	2008 GD_{108}	—	March 15, 2008	Mount Lemmon	Mount Lemmon Survey	H	330 m	MPC · JPL
795514	2008 GY_{108}	—	April 13, 2008	Kitt Peak	Spacewatch	·	1.2 km	MPC · JPL
795515	2008 GF_{126}	—	April 14, 2008	Mount Lemmon	Mount Lemmon Survey	LIX	2.3 km	MPC · JPL
795516	2008 GF_{140}	—	April 6, 2008	Mount Lemmon	Mount Lemmon Survey	THB	1.8 km	MPC · JPL
795517	2008 GO_{144}	—	April 4, 2008	Catalina	CSS	·	970 m	MPC · JPL
795518	2008 GV_{145}	—	April 11, 2008	Kitt Peak	Spacewatch	·	1.3 km	MPC · JPL
795519	2008 GZ_{146}	—	September 25, 2019	Haleakala	Pan-STARRS 1	·	1.4 km	MPC · JPL
795520	2008 GD_{148}	—	February 28, 2008	Kitt Peak	Spacewatch	·	970 m	MPC · JPL
795521	2008 GF_{153}	—	April 14, 2008	Mount Lemmon	Mount Lemmon Survey	·	1.2 km	MPC · JPL
795522	2008 GN_{153}	—	April 10, 2014	Haleakala	Pan-STARRS 1	·	2.2 km	MPC · JPL
795523	2008 GO_{153}	—	February 9, 2016	Haleakala	Pan-STARRS 1	·	970 m	MPC · JPL
795524	2008 GR_{153}	—	March 23, 2013	Mount Lemmon	Mount Lemmon Survey	H	320 m	MPC · JPL
795525	2008 GS_{153}	—	September 20, 2011	Kitt Peak	Spacewatch	(895)	2.5 km	MPC · JPL
795526	2008 GF_{154}	—	April 13, 2008	Mount Lemmon	Mount Lemmon Survey	·	1.1 km	MPC · JPL
795527	2008 GM_{155}	—	May 28, 2014	Haleakala	Pan-STARRS 1	·	1.9 km	MPC · JPL
795528	2008 GD_{157}	—	April 4, 2008	Kitt Peak	Spacewatch	·	900 m	MPC · JPL
795529	2008 GM_{159}	—	April 5, 2008	Mount Lemmon	Mount Lemmon Survey	·	1.4 km	MPC · JPL
795530	2008 GW_{163}	—	April 6, 2008	Kitt Peak	Spacewatch	·	1.9 km	MPC · JPL
795531	2008 GQ_{164}	—	April 12, 2013	Haleakala	Pan-STARRS 1	·	1.4 km	MPC · JPL
795532	2008 GT_{164}	—	February 16, 2013	Mount Lemmon	Mount Lemmon Survey	THM	1.7 km	MPC · JPL
795533	2008 GX_{166}	—	April 3, 2008	Mount Lemmon	Mount Lemmon Survey	KOR	1.0 km	MPC · JPL
795534	2008 GV_{167}	—	April 6, 2008	Mount Lemmon	Mount Lemmon Survey	·	2.2 km	MPC · JPL
795535	2008 GW_{167}	—	April 15, 2008	Mount Lemmon	Mount Lemmon Survey	·	2.3 km	MPC · JPL
795536	2008 GL_{168}	—	April 11, 2008	Mount Lemmon	Mount Lemmon Survey	·	2.5 km	MPC · JPL
795537	2008 GO_{169}	—	April 14, 2008	Kitt Peak	Spacewatch	·	1.4 km	MPC · JPL
795538	2008 GO_{171}	—	April 7, 2008	Mount Lemmon	Mount Lemmon Survey	·	1.2 km	MPC · JPL
795539	2008 GW_{171}	—	April 12, 2008	Mount Lemmon	Mount Lemmon Survey	·	1.2 km	MPC · JPL
795540	2008 GY_{171}	—	April 8, 2008	Kitt Peak	Spacewatch	·	1.3 km	MPC · JPL
795541	2008 GL_{172}	—	April 11, 2008	Mount Lemmon	Mount Lemmon Survey	·	940 m	MPC · JPL
795542	2008 GP_{172}	—	April 3, 2008	Mount Lemmon	Mount Lemmon Survey	·	1.2 km	MPC · JPL
795543	2008 GJ_{173}	—	April 14, 2008	Mount Lemmon	Mount Lemmon Survey	(5)	1.0 km	MPC · JPL
795544	2008 GV_{174}	—	April 13, 2008	Kitt Peak	Spacewatch	·	1.7 km	MPC · JPL
795545	2008 GH_{176}	—	April 3, 2008	Mount Lemmon	Mount Lemmon Survey	·	2.3 km	MPC · JPL
795546	2008 GS_{176}	—	April 14, 2008	Mount Lemmon	Mount Lemmon Survey	·	2.1 km	MPC · JPL
795547	2008 GA_{177}	—	April 1, 2008	Kitt Peak	Spacewatch	·	1.0 km	MPC · JPL
795548	2008 GW_{177}	—	April 5, 2008	Mount Lemmon	Mount Lemmon Survey	VER	2.1 km	MPC · JPL
795549	2008 GT_{178}	—	April 1, 2008	Mount Lemmon	Mount Lemmon Survey	EUP	2.1 km	MPC · JPL
795550	2008 GG_{179}	—	April 11, 2008	Mount Lemmon	Mount Lemmon Survey	·	2.5 km	MPC · JPL
795551	2008 GJ_{179}	—	April 15, 2008	Mount Lemmon	Mount Lemmon Survey	·	1.1 km	MPC · JPL
795552	2008 HJ_{5}	—	April 15, 2008	Mount Lemmon	Mount Lemmon Survey	·	1.0 km	MPC · JPL
795553	2008 HN_{11}	—	April 24, 2008	Kitt Peak	Spacewatch	·	2.1 km	MPC · JPL
795554	2008 HQ_{19}	—	April 26, 2008	Kitt Peak	Spacewatch	THB	2.0 km	MPC · JPL
795555	2008 HT_{22}	—	April 15, 2008	Mount Lemmon	Mount Lemmon Survey	·	1.2 km	MPC · JPL
795556	2008 HY_{28}	—	March 29, 2008	Mount Lemmon	Mount Lemmon Survey	·	970 m	MPC · JPL
795557	2008 HP_{30}	—	April 29, 2008	Mount Lemmon	Mount Lemmon Survey	·	1.2 km	MPC · JPL
795558	2008 HZ_{31}	—	April 29, 2008	Mount Lemmon	Mount Lemmon Survey	·	970 m	MPC · JPL
795559	2008 HM_{32}	—	April 29, 2008	Mount Lemmon	Mount Lemmon Survey	EUN	750 m	MPC · JPL
795560	2008 HO_{34}	—	February 24, 2008	Mount Lemmon	Mount Lemmon Survey	·	1.8 km	MPC · JPL
795561	2008 HG_{48}	—	April 7, 2008	Mount Lemmon	Mount Lemmon Survey	EUN · critical	700 m	MPC · JPL
795562	2008 HR_{48}	—	April 3, 2008	Mount Lemmon	Mount Lemmon Survey	·	2.6 km	MPC · JPL
795563	2008 HT_{57}	—	April 30, 2008	Kitt Peak	Spacewatch	·	2.4 km	MPC · JPL
795564	2008 HH_{58}	—	April 13, 2008	Mount Lemmon	Mount Lemmon Survey	·	1.2 km	MPC · JPL
795565	2008 HM_{63}	—	April 29, 2008	Kitt Peak	Spacewatch	EUN	830 m	MPC · JPL
795566	2008 HE_{64}	—	April 29, 2008	Mount Lemmon	Mount Lemmon Survey	·	1.3 km	MPC · JPL
795567	2008 HZ_{65}	—	April 30, 2008	Kitt Peak	Spacewatch	·	2.6 km	MPC · JPL
795568	2008 HM_{70}	—	April 5, 2008	Kitt Peak	Spacewatch	JUN	740 m	MPC · JPL
795569	2008 HK_{71}	—	April 26, 2008	Kitt Peak	Spacewatch	T_{j} (2.96)	2.5 km	MPC · JPL
795570	2008 HX_{71}	—	September 15, 2013	Mount Lemmon	Mount Lemmon Survey	BAR	870 m	MPC · JPL
795571	2008 HC_{72}	—	April 30, 2008	Mount Lemmon	Mount Lemmon Survey	T_{j} (2.99)	2.4 km	MPC · JPL
795572	2008 HQ_{72}	—	March 7, 2017	Haleakala	Pan-STARRS 1	·	1.4 km	MPC · JPL
795573	2008 HH_{73}	—	October 23, 2009	Mount Lemmon	Mount Lemmon Survey	·	740 m	MPC · JPL
795574	2008 HJ_{73}	—	September 22, 2017	Haleakala	Pan-STARRS 1	·	2.3 km	MPC · JPL
795575	2008 HS_{73}	—	April 24, 2008	Mount Lemmon	Mount Lemmon Survey	·	490 m	MPC · JPL
795576	2008 HV_{73}	—	April 17, 2008	Mount Lemmon	Mount Lemmon Survey	·	1.1 km	MPC · JPL
795577	2008 HD_{74}	—	August 24, 2012	Kitt Peak	Spacewatch	·	560 m	MPC · JPL
795578	2008 HV_{75}	—	March 27, 2017	Haleakala	Pan-STARRS 1	MRX	670 m	MPC · JPL
795579	2008 HW_{75}	—	March 27, 2008	Mount Lemmon	Mount Lemmon Survey	·	1.8 km	MPC · JPL
795580	2008 HA_{76}	—	April 27, 2008	Kitt Peak	Spacewatch	·	1.9 km	MPC · JPL
795581	2008 HU_{76}	—	September 29, 2014	Haleakala	Pan-STARRS 1	·	940 m	MPC · JPL
795582	2008 HV_{76}	—	May 7, 2014	Haleakala	Pan-STARRS 1	·	2.4 km	MPC · JPL
795583	2008 HJ_{77}	—	April 30, 2008	Mount Lemmon	Mount Lemmon Survey	·	2.4 km	MPC · JPL
795584	2008 HZ_{77}	—	April 9, 2008	Kitt Peak	Spacewatch	·	910 m	MPC · JPL
795585	2008 HH_{78}	—	April 27, 2008	Kitt Peak	Spacewatch	JUN	720 m	MPC · JPL
795586	2008 HL_{78}	—	April 28, 2008	Mount Lemmon	Mount Lemmon Survey	·	1.2 km	MPC · JPL
795587	2008 HM_{78}	—	April 29, 2008	Mount Lemmon	Mount Lemmon Survey	·	1.2 km	MPC · JPL
795588	2008 HX_{78}	—	April 29, 2008	Kitt Peak	Spacewatch	·	2.3 km	MPC · JPL
795589	2008 HY_{79}	—	April 29, 2008	Kitt Peak	Spacewatch	·	1.1 km	MPC · JPL
795590	2008 JS	—	May 2, 2008	Nogales	J.-C. Merlin	·	1.2 km	MPC · JPL
795591	2008 JD_{3}	—	April 6, 2008	Mount Lemmon	Mount Lemmon Survey	·	2.6 km	MPC · JPL
795592	2008 JB_{7}	—	May 2, 2008	Kitt Peak	Spacewatch	critical	1.1 km	MPC · JPL
795593	2008 JS_{12}	—	May 3, 2008	Kitt Peak	Spacewatch	·	2.6 km	MPC · JPL
795594	2008 JP_{15}	—	May 2, 2008	Kitt Peak	Spacewatch	(5)	1.2 km	MPC · JPL
795595	2008 JY_{15}	—	April 4, 2008	Kitt Peak	Spacewatch	·	2.0 km	MPC · JPL
795596	2008 JG_{16}	—	May 3, 2008	Mount Lemmon	Mount Lemmon Survey	·	840 m	MPC · JPL
795597	2008 JV_{17}	—	April 14, 2008	Mount Lemmon	Mount Lemmon Survey	THB	2.5 km	MPC · JPL
795598	2008 JA_{19}	—	April 5, 2008	Kitt Peak	Spacewatch	·	1.0 km	MPC · JPL
795599	2008 JE_{19}	—	April 6, 2008	Mount Lemmon	Mount Lemmon Survey	·	1.0 km	MPC · JPL
795600	2008 JX_{25}	—	April 30, 2008	Kitt Peak	Spacewatch	·	1.1 km	MPC · JPL

== 795601–795700 ==
back to top

Designation			Discovery			Properties		Ref
Permanent	Provisional	Named after	Date	Site	Discoverer(s)	Category	Diam.	Ref
795601	2008 JE_{28}	—	May 8, 2008	Kitt Peak	Spacewatch	·	1.8 km	MPC · JPL
795602	2008 JP_{29}	—	May 13, 2008	Mount Lemmon	Mount Lemmon Survey	JUN	860 m	MPC · JPL
795603	2008 JF_{30}	—	May 3, 2008	Kitt Peak	Spacewatch	·	2.1 km	MPC · JPL
795604	2008 JH_{32}	—	May 7, 2008	Kitt Peak	Spacewatch	·	950 m	MPC · JPL
795605	2008 JQ_{44}	—	May 14, 2008	Kitt Peak	Spacewatch	(1547)	1.0 km	MPC · JPL
795606	2008 JD_{45}	—	May 8, 2008	Mount Lemmon	Mount Lemmon Survey	·	1.3 km	MPC · JPL
795607	2008 JE_{45}	—	May 5, 2008	Mount Lemmon	Mount Lemmon Survey	·	1.0 km	MPC · JPL
795608	2008 JV_{45}	—	May 6, 2008	Mount Lemmon	Mount Lemmon Survey	·	620 m	MPC · JPL
795609	2008 JQ_{48}	—	September 12, 2015	Haleakala	Pan-STARRS 1	THM	1.7 km	MPC · JPL
795610	2008 JF_{51}	—	May 6, 2008	Kitt Peak	Spacewatch	·	2.0 km	MPC · JPL
795611	2008 JD_{52}	—	May 3, 2008	Mount Lemmon	Mount Lemmon Survey	EUN	870 m	MPC · JPL
795612	2008 JH_{52}	—	May 5, 2008	Mount Lemmon	Mount Lemmon Survey	·	1.3 km	MPC · JPL
795613	2008 JR_{52}	—	April 27, 2008	Kitt Peak	Spacewatch	·	830 m	MPC · JPL
795614	2008 JT_{52}	—	May 2, 2008	Kitt Peak	Spacewatch	·	1.1 km	MPC · JPL
795615	2008 JH_{53}	—	May 14, 2008	Mount Lemmon	Mount Lemmon Survey	·	1.0 km	MPC · JPL
795616	2008 KC_{1}	—	May 26, 2008	Kitt Peak	Spacewatch	·	1.5 km	MPC · JPL
795617	2008 KT_{13}	—	May 27, 2008	Kitt Peak	Spacewatch	·	1.4 km	MPC · JPL
795618	2008 KP_{22}	—	May 28, 2008	Kitt Peak	Spacewatch	·	1.1 km	MPC · JPL
795619	2008 KQ_{22}	—	April 15, 2008	Mount Lemmon	Mount Lemmon Survey	ADE	1.6 km	MPC · JPL
795620	2008 KD_{25}	—	April 5, 2008	Kitt Peak	Spacewatch	·	1.2 km	MPC · JPL
795621	2008 KJ_{29}	—	May 29, 2008	Kitt Peak	Spacewatch	·	1.2 km	MPC · JPL
795622	2008 KY_{33}	—	May 29, 2008	Kitt Peak	Spacewatch	·	2.4 km	MPC · JPL
795623	2008 KQ_{42}	—	May 31, 2008	Mount Lemmon	Mount Lemmon Survey	·	2.4 km	MPC · JPL
795624	2008 KK_{43}	—	April 4, 2019	Haleakala	Pan-STARRS 1	·	2.5 km	MPC · JPL
795625	2008 KS_{44}	—	May 14, 2008	Mount Lemmon	Mount Lemmon Survey	·	1.1 km	MPC · JPL
795626	2008 KD_{48}	—	October 9, 2015	Haleakala	Pan-STARRS 1	·	1.7 km	MPC · JPL
795627	2008 KO_{48}	—	May 30, 2008	Mount Lemmon	Mount Lemmon Survey	·	900 m	MPC · JPL
795628	2008 LR_{1}	—	June 2, 2008	Mount Lemmon	Mount Lemmon Survey	·	2.6 km	MPC · JPL
795629	2008 LE_{12}	—	May 6, 2008	Mount Lemmon	Mount Lemmon Survey	·	2.6 km	MPC · JPL
795630	2008 LY_{12}	—	April 6, 2008	Kitt Peak	Spacewatch	·	1.2 km	MPC · JPL
795631	2008 LC_{19}	—	February 7, 2011	Mount Lemmon	Mount Lemmon Survey	·	1.3 km	MPC · JPL
795632	2008 LY_{19}	—	June 1, 2008	Kitt Peak	Spacewatch	·	1.4 km	MPC · JPL
795633	2008 MR_{5}	—	June 27, 2008	Siding Spring	SSS	·	990 m	MPC · JPL
795634	2008 MS_{5}	—	June 26, 2008	Siding Spring	SSS	·	1.4 km	MPC · JPL
795635	2008 NQ_{1}	—	July 6, 2008	Pla D'Arguines	R. Ferrando, Ferrando, M.	JUN	890 m	MPC · JPL
795636	2008 NX_{3}	—	July 13, 2008	Eskridge	G. Hug	JUN	660 m	MPC · JPL
795637	2008 OE_{12}	—	July 26, 2008	Puebla de Don Fadrique	OAM	·	1.2 km	MPC · JPL
795638	2008 ON_{12}	—	December 22, 2005	Kitt Peak	Spacewatch	·	1.1 km	MPC · JPL
795639	2008 OG_{14}	—	July 31, 2008	Dauban	C. Rinner, F. Kugel	·	1.2 km	MPC · JPL
795640	2008 OJ_{17}	—	July 29, 2008	Mount Lemmon	Mount Lemmon Survey	·	1.4 km	MPC · JPL
795641	2008 OM_{18}	—	July 30, 2008	Mount Lemmon	Mount Lemmon Survey	·	1.2 km	MPC · JPL
795642	2008 OH_{30}	—	February 13, 2011	Mount Lemmon	Mount Lemmon Survey	EOS	1.3 km	MPC · JPL
795643	2008 PF_{17}	—	August 11, 2008	Puebla de Don Fadrique	OAM	PHO	790 m	MPC · JPL
795644	2008 PP_{22}	—	June 3, 2008	Mount Lemmon	Mount Lemmon Survey	·	650 m	MPC · JPL
795645	2008 PT_{23}	—	February 5, 2011	Haleakala	Pan-STARRS 1	·	2.0 km	MPC · JPL
795646	2008 QB_{7}	—	August 26, 2008	Parc National des Cévennes	C. Demeautis, J.-M. Lopez	·	3.3 km	MPC · JPL
795647	2008 QW_{19}	—	August 29, 2008	Wildberg	R. Apitzsch	·	1.7 km	MPC · JPL
795648	2008 QR_{22}	—	August 25, 2008	Črni Vrh	Matičič, S.	·	970 m	MPC · JPL
795649	2008 QW_{24}	—	August 30, 2008	Dauban	C. Rinner, F. Kugel	·	1.0 km	MPC · JPL
795650	2008 QN_{40}	—	August 24, 2008	Kitt Peak	Spacewatch	L4	6.2 km	MPC · JPL
795651	2008 QW_{45}	—	August 26, 2008	Socorro	LINEAR	·	1.6 km	MPC · JPL
795652	2008 QC_{51}	—	August 24, 2008	Kitt Peak	Spacewatch	·	1.5 km	MPC · JPL
795653	2008 QH_{51}	—	August 24, 2008	Kitt Peak	Spacewatch	ADE	1.3 km	MPC · JPL
795654	2008 QW_{51}	—	August 21, 2008	Kitt Peak	Spacewatch	·	2.0 km	MPC · JPL
795655	2008 QU_{52}	—	August 21, 2008	Kitt Peak	Spacewatch	GEF	890 m	MPC · JPL
795656	2008 QZ_{52}	—	March 28, 2016	Cerro Tololo	DECam	·	1.3 km	MPC · JPL
795657	2008 RR	—	May 29, 2008	Mount Lemmon	Mount Lemmon Survey	·	1.3 km	MPC · JPL
795658	2008 RW_{7}	—	December 19, 2009	Mount Lemmon	Mount Lemmon Survey	EUN	940 m	MPC · JPL
795659	2008 RJ_{13}	—	September 4, 2008	Kitt Peak	Spacewatch	·	1.4 km	MPC · JPL
795660	2008 RC_{21}	—	September 4, 2008	Kitt Peak	Spacewatch	·	1.1 km	MPC · JPL
795661	2008 RS_{26}	—	September 2, 2008	Siding Spring	SSS	T_{j} (2.88) · AMO +1km	960 m	MPC · JPL
795662	2008 RM_{30}	—	September 2, 2008	Kitt Peak	Spacewatch	·	720 m	MPC · JPL
795663	2008 RV_{30}	—	September 2, 2008	Kitt Peak	Spacewatch	·	890 m	MPC · JPL
795664	2008 RZ_{30}	—	September 2, 2008	Kitt Peak	Spacewatch	GEF	820 m	MPC · JPL
795665	2008 RA_{44}	—	September 2, 2008	Kitt Peak	Spacewatch	·	1.1 km	MPC · JPL
795666	2008 RX_{61}	—	September 4, 2008	Kitt Peak	Spacewatch	·	830 m	MPC · JPL
795667	2008 RD_{63}	—	September 4, 2008	Kitt Peak	Spacewatch	·	910 m	MPC · JPL
795668	2008 RB_{68}	—	September 4, 2008	Kitt Peak	Spacewatch	H	430 m	MPC · JPL
795669	2008 RP_{70}	—	August 28, 2008	Črni Vrh	Skvarč, J.	·	520 m	MPC · JPL
795670	2008 RF_{84}	—	September 4, 2008	Kitt Peak	Spacewatch	·	1.4 km	MPC · JPL
795671	2008 RD_{102}	—	September 3, 2008	Kitt Peak	Spacewatch	·	1.3 km	MPC · JPL
795672	2008 RX_{103}	—	September 5, 2008	Kitt Peak	Spacewatch	·	920 m	MPC · JPL
795673	2008 RV_{111}	—	September 4, 2008	Kitt Peak	Spacewatch	MRX	690 m	MPC · JPL
795674	2008 RD_{118}	—	September 9, 2008	Mount Lemmon	Mount Lemmon Survey	·	1.4 km	MPC · JPL
795675	2008 RP_{122}	—	September 4, 2008	Kitt Peak	Spacewatch	L4	7.0 km	MPC · JPL
795676	2008 RC_{143}	—	September 2, 2008	Kitt Peak	Spacewatch	·	1.1 km	MPC · JPL
795677	2008 RK_{143}	—	September 4, 2008	Kitt Peak	Spacewatch	DOR	1.5 km	MPC · JPL
795678	2008 RF_{149}	—	September 7, 2008	Mount Lemmon	Mount Lemmon Survey	·	1.2 km	MPC · JPL
795679	2008 RG_{151}	—	January 10, 2014	Kitt Peak	Spacewatch	(5)	810 m	MPC · JPL
795680	2008 RD_{152}	—	September 4, 2008	Kitt Peak	Spacewatch	GEF	790 m	MPC · JPL
795681	2008 RJ_{153}	—	September 4, 2008	Kitt Peak	Spacewatch	WIT	700 m	MPC · JPL
795682	2008 RK_{155}	—	September 7, 2008	Mount Lemmon	Mount Lemmon Survey	·	1.2 km	MPC · JPL
795683	2008 RQ_{156}	—	February 19, 2014	Mount Lemmon	Mount Lemmon Survey	·	870 m	MPC · JPL
795684	2008 RH_{157}	—	September 3, 2008	Kitt Peak	Spacewatch	VER	2.1 km	MPC · JPL
795685	2008 RF_{158}	—	September 4, 2008	Kitt Peak	Spacewatch	·	1.2 km	MPC · JPL
795686	2008 RG_{160}	—	March 4, 2016	Haleakala	Pan-STARRS 1	·	1.3 km	MPC · JPL
795687	2008 RB_{164}	—	November 18, 2014	Mount Lemmon	Mount Lemmon Survey	VER	1.8 km	MPC · JPL
795688	2008 RQ_{165}	—	September 5, 2008	Kitt Peak	Spacewatch	·	2.0 km	MPC · JPL
795689	2008 RC_{166}	—	September 9, 2008	Mount Lemmon	Mount Lemmon Survey	·	1.3 km	MPC · JPL
795690	2008 RX_{166}	—	September 3, 2008	Kitt Peak	Spacewatch	·	1.3 km	MPC · JPL
795691	2008 RG_{168}	—	September 7, 2008	Mount Lemmon	Mount Lemmon Survey	HOF	1.8 km	MPC · JPL
795692	2008 RG_{169}	—	September 6, 2008	Mount Lemmon	Mount Lemmon Survey	MAS	510 m	MPC · JPL
795693	2008 RA_{170}	—	September 7, 2008	Mount Lemmon	Mount Lemmon Survey	·	1.8 km	MPC · JPL
795694	2008 RK_{170}	—	September 9, 2008	Catalina	CSS	·	1.5 km	MPC · JPL
795695	2008 RO_{174}	—	September 7, 2008	Mount Lemmon	Mount Lemmon Survey	·	660 m	MPC · JPL
795696	2008 RO_{176}	—	September 7, 2008	Mount Lemmon	Mount Lemmon Survey	(5)	710 m	MPC · JPL
795697	2008 RH_{177}	—	September 9, 2008	Mount Lemmon	Mount Lemmon Survey	·	1.2 km	MPC · JPL
795698	2008 RH_{179}	—	September 5, 2008	Kitt Peak	Spacewatch	AEO	970 m	MPC · JPL
795699	2008 RE_{180}	—	September 4, 2008	Kitt Peak	Spacewatch	·	1.1 km	MPC · JPL
795700	2008 RB_{184}	—	September 3, 2008	Kitt Peak	Spacewatch	URS	2.1 km	MPC · JPL

== 795701–795800 ==
back to top

Designation			Discovery			Properties		Ref
Permanent	Provisional	Named after	Date	Site	Discoverer(s)	Category	Diam.	Ref
795701	2008 RM_{185}	—	September 4, 2008	Kitt Peak	Spacewatch	·	1.4 km	MPC · JPL
795702	2008 RR_{185}	—	September 6, 2008	Kitt Peak	Spacewatch	·	1.8 km	MPC · JPL
795703	2008 RC_{186}	—	September 4, 2008	Kitt Peak	Spacewatch	HOF	1.8 km	MPC · JPL
795704	2008 RN_{186}	—	September 7, 2008	Mount Lemmon	Mount Lemmon Survey	AGN	790 m	MPC · JPL
795705	2008 RE_{188}	—	September 4, 2008	Kitt Peak	Spacewatch	·	1.8 km	MPC · JPL
795706	2008 SK	—	September 21, 2008	Catalina	CSS	·	1.1 km	MPC · JPL
795707	2008 SD_{12}	—	September 2, 2008	Siding Spring	SSS	H	560 m	MPC · JPL
795708	2008 SX_{12}	—	September 2, 2008	Kitt Peak	Spacewatch	·	770 m	MPC · JPL
795709	2008 SV_{30}	—	September 9, 2008	Kitt Peak	Spacewatch	·	1.6 km	MPC · JPL
795710	2008 SW_{42}	—	September 20, 2008	Kitt Peak	Spacewatch	·	1.1 km	MPC · JPL
795711	2008 SN_{49}	—	August 24, 2008	Kitt Peak	Spacewatch	EUN	660 m	MPC · JPL
795712	2008 SV_{64}	—	September 7, 2008	Mount Lemmon	Mount Lemmon Survey	CLA	1.5 km	MPC · JPL
795713	2008 SL_{65}	—	September 21, 2008	Mount Lemmon	Mount Lemmon Survey	H	480 m	MPC · JPL
795714	2008 SW_{76}	—	August 24, 2008	Kitt Peak	Spacewatch	·	1.6 km	MPC · JPL
795715	2008 SW_{78}	—	September 3, 2008	Kitt Peak	Spacewatch	AGN	930 m	MPC · JPL
795716	2008 SQ_{82}	—	September 8, 2008	Kitt Peak	Spacewatch	·	1.4 km	MPC · JPL
795717	2008 SN_{96}	—	September 9, 2008	Mount Lemmon	Mount Lemmon Survey	·	1.4 km	MPC · JPL
795718	2008 SH_{102}	—	September 21, 2008	Kitt Peak	Spacewatch	·	1.0 km	MPC · JPL
795719	2008 SC_{103}	—	September 7, 2008	Mount Lemmon	Mount Lemmon Survey	·	1.0 km	MPC · JPL
795720	2008 SH_{103}	—	September 6, 2008	Mount Lemmon	Mount Lemmon Survey	·	1.0 km	MPC · JPL
795721	2008 SD_{105}	—	September 21, 2008	Kitt Peak	Spacewatch	·	1.8 km	MPC · JPL
795722	2008 SC_{106}	—	September 7, 2008	Mount Lemmon	Mount Lemmon Survey	MRX	830 m	MPC · JPL
795723	2008 SE_{113}	—	September 20, 2008	Catalina	CSS	·	1.8 km	MPC · JPL
795724	2008 SX_{132}	—	September 22, 2008	Kitt Peak	Spacewatch	TIN	770 m	MPC · JPL
795725	2008 SH_{133}	—	September 22, 2008	Kitt Peak	Spacewatch	KON	1.6 km	MPC · JPL
795726	2008 SF_{139}	—	September 23, 2008	Kitt Peak	Spacewatch	·	1.9 km	MPC · JPL
795727	2008 SB_{180}	—	September 24, 2008	Mount Lemmon	Mount Lemmon Survey	·	1.5 km	MPC · JPL
795728	2008 SR_{183}	—	September 24, 2008	Kitt Peak	Spacewatch	·	510 m	MPC · JPL
795729	2008 SE_{186}	—	September 25, 2008	Mount Lemmon	Mount Lemmon Survey	·	2.3 km	MPC · JPL
795730	2008 SZ_{198}	—	September 26, 2008	Mount Lemmon	Mount Lemmon Survey	·	1.5 km	MPC · JPL
795731	2008 SJ_{199}	—	September 26, 2008	Mount Lemmon	Mount Lemmon Survey	·	1.2 km	MPC · JPL
795732	2008 SF_{216}	—	September 29, 2008	Mount Lemmon	Mount Lemmon Survey	·	1.5 km	MPC · JPL
795733	2008 SQ_{218}	—	September 24, 2008	Catalina	CSS	·	1.1 km	MPC · JPL
795734	2008 SV_{223}	—	September 25, 2008	Mount Lemmon	Mount Lemmon Survey	·	1.5 km	MPC · JPL
795735	2008 SJ_{224}	—	September 26, 2008	Kitt Peak	Spacewatch	·	1.3 km	MPC · JPL
795736	2008 SD_{227}	—	September 28, 2008	Mount Lemmon	Mount Lemmon Survey	·	1.4 km	MPC · JPL
795737	2008 SF_{230}	—	September 28, 2008	Mount Lemmon	Mount Lemmon Survey	·	1.0 km	MPC · JPL
795738	2008 SH_{231}	—	December 3, 2005	Mauna Kea	A. Boattini	·	1.5 km	MPC · JPL
795739	2008 SW_{236}	—	September 29, 2008	Kitt Peak	Spacewatch	·	1.4 km	MPC · JPL
795740	2008 SU_{238}	—	August 24, 2008	Kitt Peak	Spacewatch	·	1.5 km	MPC · JPL
795741	2008 ST_{247}	—	September 28, 2008	Mount Lemmon	Mount Lemmon Survey	·	1.7 km	MPC · JPL
795742	2008 SX_{248}	—	September 21, 2008	Kitt Peak	Spacewatch	·	2.1 km	MPC · JPL
795743	2008 SE_{253}	—	September 21, 2008	Kitt Peak	Spacewatch	·	610 m	MPC · JPL
795744	2008 SM_{254}	—	September 22, 2008	Mount Lemmon	Mount Lemmon Survey	·	1.3 km	MPC · JPL
795745	2008 SO_{259}	—	September 23, 2008	Mount Lemmon	Mount Lemmon Survey	·	1.2 km	MPC · JPL
795746	2008 SM_{262}	—	September 24, 2008	Kitt Peak	Spacewatch	·	1.9 km	MPC · JPL
795747	2008 SS_{270}	—	September 25, 2008	Kitt Peak	Spacewatch	·	2.1 km	MPC · JPL
795748	2008 SV_{273}	—	September 10, 2008	Kitt Peak	Spacewatch	·	1.0 km	MPC · JPL
795749	2008 SM_{274}	—	September 20, 2008	Kitt Peak	Spacewatch	·	1.2 km	MPC · JPL
795750	2008 SP_{298}	—	September 21, 2008	Mount Lemmon	Mount Lemmon Survey	·	2.7 km	MPC · JPL
795751	2008 SL_{299}	—	September 22, 2008	Kitt Peak	Spacewatch	·	930 m	MPC · JPL
795752	2008 SB_{300}	—	September 22, 2008	Kitt Peak	Spacewatch	·	1.4 km	MPC · JPL
795753	2008 SG_{305}	—	September 26, 2008	Kitt Peak	Spacewatch	·	1.4 km	MPC · JPL
795754	2008 SC_{311}	—	November 17, 2014	Haleakala	Pan-STARRS 1	·	2.1 km	MPC · JPL
795755	2008 SN_{314}	—	September 23, 2008	Mount Lemmon	Mount Lemmon Survey	NYS	790 m	MPC · JPL
795756	2008 SN_{316}	—	July 11, 2004	Socorro	LINEAR	·	860 m	MPC · JPL
795757	2008 SP_{316}	—	September 24, 2008	Mount Lemmon	Mount Lemmon Survey	GEF	880 m	MPC · JPL
795758	2008 SB_{317}	—	April 30, 2016	Haleakala	Pan-STARRS 1	·	1.3 km	MPC · JPL
795759	2008 SE_{317}	—	September 23, 2008	Mount Lemmon	Mount Lemmon Survey	·	980 m	MPC · JPL
795760	2008 SS_{319}	—	July 3, 2011	Mount Lemmon	Mount Lemmon Survey	·	560 m	MPC · JPL
795761	2008 SO_{322}	—	March 14, 2011	Mount Lemmon	Mount Lemmon Survey	·	1.4 km	MPC · JPL
795762	2008 SP_{328}	—	January 3, 2016	Haleakala	Pan-STARRS 1	·	2.1 km	MPC · JPL
795763	2008 SQ_{333}	—	May 14, 2018	Mount Lemmon	Mount Lemmon Survey	VER	2.0 km	MPC · JPL
795764	2008 SR_{333}	—	February 8, 2011	Mount Lemmon	Mount Lemmon Survey	·	2.1 km	MPC · JPL
795765	2008 SX_{334}	—	July 13, 2013	Haleakala	Pan-STARRS 1	·	1.9 km	MPC · JPL
795766	2008 SB_{335}	—	February 10, 2011	Mount Lemmon	Mount Lemmon Survey	·	1.9 km	MPC · JPL
795767	2008 SM_{336}	—	November 17, 2014	Haleakala	Pan-STARRS 1	·	1.9 km	MPC · JPL
795768	2008 SR_{337}	—	September 19, 2014	Haleakala	Pan-STARRS 1	·	2.1 km	MPC · JPL
795769	2008 SV_{337}	—	September 29, 2008	Mount Lemmon	Mount Lemmon Survey	·	1.8 km	MPC · JPL
795770	2008 SB_{341}	—	September 29, 2008	Mount Lemmon	Mount Lemmon Survey	·	1.9 km	MPC · JPL
795771	2008 SZ_{341}	—	September 20, 2008	Mount Lemmon	Mount Lemmon Survey	·	630 m	MPC · JPL
795772	2008 SU_{345}	—	September 28, 2008	Mount Lemmon	Mount Lemmon Survey	LUT	2.6 km	MPC · JPL
795773	2008 SY_{346}	—	September 24, 2008	Mount Lemmon	Mount Lemmon Survey	·	780 m	MPC · JPL
795774	2008 SC_{348}	—	September 29, 2008	Kitt Peak	Spacewatch	·	910 m	MPC · JPL
795775	2008 SW_{348}	—	September 28, 2008	Mount Lemmon	Mount Lemmon Survey	·	2.6 km	MPC · JPL
795776	2008 SF_{349}	—	September 21, 2008	Kitt Peak	Spacewatch	·	1.6 km	MPC · JPL
795777	2008 SU_{349}	—	September 23, 2008	Kitt Peak	Spacewatch	·	1.7 km	MPC · JPL
795778	2008 SL_{351}	—	September 23, 2008	Mount Lemmon	Mount Lemmon Survey	·	780 m	MPC · JPL
795779	2008 SY_{354}	—	September 26, 2008	Kitt Peak	Spacewatch	TIN	690 m	MPC · JPL
795780	2008 SB_{355}	—	September 22, 2008	Mount Lemmon	Mount Lemmon Survey	·	1.6 km	MPC · JPL
795781	2008 SC_{355}	—	September 29, 2008	Mount Lemmon	Mount Lemmon Survey	AEO	820 m	MPC · JPL
795782	2008 SK_{358}	—	September 24, 2008	Mount Lemmon	Mount Lemmon Survey	·	1.0 km	MPC · JPL
795783	2008 SW_{358}	—	September 24, 2008	Kitt Peak	Spacewatch	·	1.5 km	MPC · JPL
795784	2008 SF_{360}	—	September 23, 2008	Kitt Peak	Spacewatch	·	1.9 km	MPC · JPL
795785	2008 SO_{361}	—	September 24, 2008	Mount Lemmon	Mount Lemmon Survey	·	1.6 km	MPC · JPL
795786	2008 SV_{361}	—	September 23, 2008	Kitt Peak	Spacewatch	HOF	1.8 km	MPC · JPL
795787	2008 SW_{363}	—	September 23, 2008	Mount Lemmon	Mount Lemmon Survey	·	1.3 km	MPC · JPL
795788	2008 TG_{12}	—	October 1, 2008	Mount Lemmon	Mount Lemmon Survey	·	1.3 km	MPC · JPL
795789	2008 TX_{12}	—	September 2, 2008	Kitt Peak	Spacewatch	HOF	2.1 km	MPC · JPL
795790	2008 TH_{13}	—	October 1, 2008	Mount Lemmon	Mount Lemmon Survey	·	800 m	MPC · JPL
795791	2008 TQ_{13}	—	September 19, 2008	Kitt Peak	Spacewatch	·	950 m	MPC · JPL
795792	2008 TB_{14}	—	October 1, 2008	Mount Lemmon	Mount Lemmon Survey	·	1.4 km	MPC · JPL
795793	2008 TH_{14}	—	September 21, 2008	Kitt Peak	Spacewatch	V	470 m	MPC · JPL
795794	2008 TE_{15}	—	September 21, 2008	Kitt Peak	Spacewatch	·	1.3 km	MPC · JPL
795795	2008 TR_{16}	—	October 1, 2008	Mount Lemmon	Mount Lemmon Survey	·	1.2 km	MPC · JPL
795796	2008 TG_{23}	—	September 7, 2008	Mount Lemmon	Mount Lemmon Survey	·	610 m	MPC · JPL
795797	2008 TY_{33}	—	October 1, 2008	Kitt Peak	Spacewatch	·	800 m	MPC · JPL
795798	2008 TV_{39}	—	October 1, 2008	Kitt Peak	Spacewatch	AGN	850 m	MPC · JPL
795799	2008 TU_{41}	—	October 1, 2008	Mount Lemmon	Mount Lemmon Survey	TIR	1.8 km	MPC · JPL
795800	2008 TK_{50}	—	September 24, 2008	Kitt Peak	Spacewatch	·	1.8 km	MPC · JPL

== 795801–795900 ==
back to top

Designation			Discovery			Properties		Ref
Permanent	Provisional	Named after	Date	Site	Discoverer(s)	Category	Diam.	Ref
795801	2008 TQ_{55}	—	October 2, 2008	Kitt Peak	Spacewatch	KON	1.5 km	MPC · JPL
795802	2008 TB_{56}	—	October 2, 2008	Kitt Peak	Spacewatch	·	890 m	MPC · JPL
795803	2008 TK_{81}	—	October 1, 2005	Mount Lemmon	Mount Lemmon Survey	·	480 m	MPC · JPL
795804	2008 TF_{87}	—	September 24, 2008	Kitt Peak	Spacewatch	·	1.2 km	MPC · JPL
795805	2008 TQ_{97}	—	October 6, 2008	Kitt Peak	Spacewatch	PHO	780 m	MPC · JPL
795806	2008 TO_{99}	—	September 24, 2008	Kitt Peak	Spacewatch	GAL	1.1 km	MPC · JPL
795807	2008 TH_{100}	—	September 20, 2008	Kitt Peak	Spacewatch	NYS	980 m	MPC · JPL
795808	2008 TG_{105}	—	September 22, 2008	Mount Lemmon	Mount Lemmon Survey	·	1.1 km	MPC · JPL
795809	2008 TN_{107}	—	October 6, 2008	Mount Lemmon	Mount Lemmon Survey	·	1.2 km	MPC · JPL
795810	2008 TA_{117}	—	October 6, 2008	Mount Lemmon	Mount Lemmon Survey	KOR	940 m	MPC · JPL
795811	2008 TW_{122}	—	October 7, 2008	Kitt Peak	Spacewatch	·	1.0 km	MPC · JPL
795812	2008 TD_{123}	—	October 7, 2008	Kitt Peak	Spacewatch	·	1.4 km	MPC · JPL
795813	2008 TL_{142}	—	October 7, 2008	Kitt Peak	Spacewatch	·	1.9 km	MPC · JPL
795814	2008 TT_{147}	—	October 9, 2008	Mount Lemmon	Mount Lemmon Survey	·	2.1 km	MPC · JPL
795815	2008 TU_{148}	—	September 2, 2008	Kitt Peak	Spacewatch	·	960 m	MPC · JPL
795816	2008 TR_{149}	—	October 9, 2008	Mount Lemmon	Mount Lemmon Survey	AGN	860 m	MPC · JPL
795817	2008 TC_{162}	—	October 10, 2008	Mount Lemmon	Mount Lemmon Survey	·	1.3 km	MPC · JPL
795818	2008 TS_{168}	—	October 3, 2008	Mount Lemmon	Mount Lemmon Survey	·	2.4 km	MPC · JPL
795819	2008 TW_{171}	—	October 8, 2008	Kitt Peak	Spacewatch	·	1.0 km	MPC · JPL
795820	2008 TE_{176}	—	October 1, 2008	Kitt Peak	Spacewatch	TEL	850 m	MPC · JPL
795821	2008 TN_{183}	—	October 2, 2008	Kitt Peak	Spacewatch	·	1.4 km	MPC · JPL
795822	2008 TZ_{195}	—	October 10, 2008	Mount Lemmon	Mount Lemmon Survey	·	560 m	MPC · JPL
795823	2008 TK_{199}	—	September 24, 2017	Mount Lemmon	Mount Lemmon Survey	·	1.3 km	MPC · JPL
795824	2008 TA_{200}	—	October 8, 2008	Mount Lemmon	Mount Lemmon Survey	·	2.0 km	MPC · JPL
795825	2008 TJ_{206}	—	October 6, 2008	Mount Lemmon	Mount Lemmon Survey	·	660 m	MPC · JPL
795826	2008 TM_{207}	—	January 26, 2017	Haleakala	Pan-STARRS 1	·	2.5 km	MPC · JPL
795827	2008 TC_{212}	—	October 1, 2008	Mount Lemmon	Mount Lemmon Survey	·	2.1 km	MPC · JPL
795828	2008 TA_{215}	—	April 27, 2012	Haleakala	Pan-STARRS 1	·	2.1 km	MPC · JPL
795829	2008 TU_{217}	—	October 9, 2008	Kitt Peak	Spacewatch	·	920 m	MPC · JPL
795830	2008 TD_{218}	—	October 8, 2008	Mount Lemmon	Mount Lemmon Survey	·	2.3 km	MPC · JPL
795831	2008 TL_{218}	—	October 2, 2008	Kitt Peak	Spacewatch	(12739)	1.2 km	MPC · JPL
795832	2008 TB_{221}	—	October 7, 2008	Mount Lemmon	Mount Lemmon Survey	·	930 m	MPC · JPL
795833	2008 TU_{225}	—	October 2, 2008	Kitt Peak	Spacewatch	·	2.1 km	MPC · JPL
795834	2008 TE_{227}	—	October 6, 2008	Mount Lemmon	Mount Lemmon Survey	·	1.3 km	MPC · JPL
795835	2008 TM_{227}	—	October 1, 2008	Mount Lemmon	Mount Lemmon Survey	·	1.8 km	MPC · JPL
795836	2008 TS_{227}	—	October 3, 2008	Mount Lemmon	Mount Lemmon Survey	·	1.3 km	MPC · JPL
795837	2008 TQ_{228}	—	October 7, 2008	Mount Lemmon	Mount Lemmon Survey	·	1.1 km	MPC · JPL
795838	2008 TZ_{228}	—	October 9, 2008	Mount Lemmon	Mount Lemmon Survey	·	2.0 km	MPC · JPL
795839	2008 TF_{229}	—	October 8, 2008	Mount Lemmon	Mount Lemmon Survey	·	930 m	MPC · JPL
795840	2008 TG_{230}	—	October 8, 2008	Mount Lemmon	Mount Lemmon Survey	·	1.2 km	MPC · JPL
795841	2008 TL_{230}	—	October 6, 2008	Kitt Peak	Spacewatch	·	1.8 km	MPC · JPL
795842	2008 TV_{230}	—	October 8, 2008	Mount Lemmon	Mount Lemmon Survey	SYL	3.3 km	MPC · JPL
795843	2008 TM_{236}	—	October 6, 2008	Kitt Peak	Spacewatch	KOR	1.1 km	MPC · JPL
795844	2008 TU_{237}	—	October 7, 2008	Mount Lemmon	Mount Lemmon Survey	·	1.6 km	MPC · JPL
795845	2008 TV_{237}	—	October 2, 2008	Mount Lemmon	Mount Lemmon Survey	·	1.3 km	MPC · JPL
795846	2008 TB_{238}	—	October 1, 2008	Mount Lemmon	Mount Lemmon Survey	·	1.5 km	MPC · JPL
795847	2008 TK_{238}	—	October 10, 2008	Mount Lemmon	Mount Lemmon Survey	HOF	1.8 km	MPC · JPL
795848	2008 TW_{238}	—	October 1, 2008	Kitt Peak	Spacewatch	·	1.6 km	MPC · JPL
795849	2008 TO_{239}	—	October 8, 2008	Mount Lemmon	Mount Lemmon Survey	·	1.5 km	MPC · JPL
795850	2008 TO_{241}	—	October 7, 2008	Kitt Peak	Spacewatch	·	1.6 km	MPC · JPL
795851	2008 TS_{242}	—	October 8, 2008	Mount Lemmon	Mount Lemmon Survey	·	1.3 km	MPC · JPL
795852	2008 US_{20}	—	October 6, 2008	Kitt Peak	Spacewatch	·	1.8 km	MPC · JPL
795853	2008 UJ_{29}	—	September 24, 2008	Mount Lemmon	Mount Lemmon Survey	·	980 m	MPC · JPL
795854	2008 UX_{44}	—	October 18, 1999	Kitt Peak	Spacewatch	AEO	830 m	MPC · JPL
795855	2008 UD_{50}	—	September 29, 2008	Kitt Peak	Spacewatch	HOF	1.9 km	MPC · JPL
795856	2008 UH_{64}	—	October 21, 2008	Mount Lemmon	Mount Lemmon Survey	·	1.9 km	MPC · JPL
795857	2008 UC_{71}	—	October 21, 2008	Kitt Peak	Spacewatch	·	1.5 km	MPC · JPL
795858	2008 UF_{85}	—	October 23, 2008	Kitt Peak	Spacewatch	·	820 m	MPC · JPL
795859	2008 UP_{86}	—	October 23, 2008	Kitt Peak	Spacewatch	H	420 m	MPC · JPL
795860	2008 US_{96}	—	September 6, 2008	Mount Lemmon	Mount Lemmon Survey	·	730 m	MPC · JPL
795861	2008 US_{100}	—	April 26, 2006	Cerro Tololo	Deep Ecliptic Survey	·	1.8 km	MPC · JPL
795862	2008 US_{101}	—	October 20, 2008	Kitt Peak	Spacewatch	·	1.3 km	MPC · JPL
795863	2008 UC_{105}	—	October 20, 2008	Mount Lemmon	Mount Lemmon Survey	KOR	860 m	MPC · JPL
795864	2008 UZ_{137}	—	October 23, 2008	Kitt Peak	Spacewatch	·	790 m	MPC · JPL
795865	2008 UU_{140}	—	October 23, 2008	Kitt Peak	Spacewatch	HYG	1.9 km	MPC · JPL
795866	2008 UA_{142}	—	September 22, 2008	Mount Lemmon	Mount Lemmon Survey	·	730 m	MPC · JPL
795867	2008 UT_{149}	—	October 2, 2008	Kitt Peak	Spacewatch	·	1.3 km	MPC · JPL
795868	2008 UJ_{161}	—	September 24, 2008	Kitt Peak	Spacewatch	·	1.0 km	MPC · JPL
795869	2008 UA_{162}	—	October 24, 2008	Kitt Peak	Spacewatch	EOS	1.2 km	MPC · JPL
795870	2008 UX_{165}	—	October 24, 2008	Kitt Peak	Spacewatch	ERI	1.1 km	MPC · JPL
795871	2008 UE_{172}	—	September 6, 2008	Mount Lemmon	Mount Lemmon Survey	·	940 m	MPC · JPL
795872	2008 UO_{176}	—	October 24, 2008	Mount Lemmon	Mount Lemmon Survey	·	1.2 km	MPC · JPL
795873	2008 UO_{181}	—	September 26, 2008	Kitt Peak	Spacewatch	·	1.2 km	MPC · JPL
795874	2008 UR_{181}	—	September 23, 2008	Kitt Peak	Spacewatch	DOR	2.0 km	MPC · JPL
795875	2008 UZ_{183}	—	September 27, 2008	Mount Lemmon	Mount Lemmon Survey	·	1.7 km	MPC · JPL
795876	2008 UF_{184}	—	October 24, 2008	Kitt Peak	Spacewatch	·	1.4 km	MPC · JPL
795877	2008 UW_{207}	—	October 23, 2008	Kitt Peak	Spacewatch	PHO	730 m	MPC · JPL
795878	2008 UF_{208}	—	October 23, 2008	Kitt Peak	Spacewatch	EOS	1.1 km	MPC · JPL
795879	2008 UA_{220}	—	October 25, 2008	Kitt Peak	Spacewatch	·	1.3 km	MPC · JPL
795880	2008 UX_{220}	—	September 23, 2008	Mount Lemmon	Mount Lemmon Survey	H	410 m	MPC · JPL
795881	2008 UC_{231}	—	October 26, 2008	Kitt Peak	Spacewatch	·	660 m	MPC · JPL
795882	2008 UP_{231}	—	October 26, 2008	Kitt Peak	Spacewatch	·	1.4 km	MPC · JPL
795883	2008 UU_{232}	—	September 18, 2003	Kitt Peak	Spacewatch	·	1.4 km	MPC · JPL
795884	2008 UF_{242}	—	October 26, 2008	Kitt Peak	Spacewatch	·	1.2 km	MPC · JPL
795885	2008 UK_{247}	—	October 26, 2008	Kitt Peak	Spacewatch	·	1.0 km	MPC · JPL
795886	2008 UW_{250}	—	October 27, 2008	Kitt Peak	Spacewatch	AGN	880 m	MPC · JPL
795887	2008 UG_{262}	—	October 27, 2008	Kitt Peak	Spacewatch	H	450 m	MPC · JPL
795888	2008 UT_{266}	—	October 28, 2008	Kitt Peak	Spacewatch	·	950 m	MPC · JPL
795889	2008 UZ_{270}	—	October 20, 2008	Mount Lemmon	Mount Lemmon Survey	·	1.2 km	MPC · JPL
795890	2008 UU_{271}	—	October 28, 2008	Kitt Peak	Spacewatch	·	2.2 km	MPC · JPL
795891	2008 UL_{279}	—	October 28, 2008	Mount Lemmon	Mount Lemmon Survey	EUN	820 m	MPC · JPL
795892	2008 UW_{283}	—	September 29, 2008	Mount Lemmon	Mount Lemmon Survey	BRA	1.2 km	MPC · JPL
795893	2008 UW_{291}	—	October 9, 2008	Kitt Peak	Spacewatch	JUN	780 m	MPC · JPL
795894	2008 UK_{297}	—	October 21, 2008	Kitt Peak	Spacewatch	·	1.5 km	MPC · JPL
795895	2008 UH_{312}	—	October 8, 2008	Mount Lemmon	Mount Lemmon Survey	·	2.2 km	MPC · JPL
795896	2008 UM_{319}	—	October 31, 2008	Mount Lemmon	Mount Lemmon Survey	·	2.2 km	MPC · JPL
795897	2008 UG_{321}	—	October 22, 2008	Kitt Peak	Spacewatch	·	1.3 km	MPC · JPL
795898	2008 UE_{342}	—	October 28, 2008	Mount Lemmon	Mount Lemmon Survey	·	840 m	MPC · JPL
795899	2008 UG_{348}	—	October 24, 2008	Mount Lemmon	Mount Lemmon Survey	·	1.2 km	MPC · JPL
795900	2008 UV_{358}	—	October 27, 2008	Kitt Peak	Spacewatch	·	1.7 km	MPC · JPL

== 795901–796000 ==
back to top

Designation			Discovery			Properties		Ref
Permanent	Provisional	Named after	Date	Site	Discoverer(s)	Category	Diam.	Ref
795901	2008 UB_{363}	—	October 2, 2008	Catalina	CSS	CLO	1.9 km	MPC · JPL
795902	2008 UG_{378}	—	October 27, 2008	Mount Lemmon	Mount Lemmon Survey	H	380 m	MPC · JPL
795903	2008 UW_{378}	—	June 5, 2016	Haleakala	Pan-STARRS 1	AGN	910 m	MPC · JPL
795904	2008 UC_{383}	—	March 13, 2016	Haleakala	Pan-STARRS 1	EOS	1.2 km	MPC · JPL
795905	2008 UU_{383}	—	October 26, 2008	Kitt Peak	Spacewatch	·	670 m	MPC · JPL
795906	2008 UO_{385}	—	November 16, 2014	Mount Lemmon	Mount Lemmon Survey	·	2.4 km	MPC · JPL
795907	2008 UL_{386}	—	October 27, 2008	Kitt Peak	Spacewatch	KOR	1.1 km	MPC · JPL
795908	2008 UX_{387}	—	October 26, 2008	Kitt Peak	Spacewatch	·	1.0 km	MPC · JPL
795909	2008 UG_{391}	—	August 18, 2017	Haleakala	Pan-STARRS 1	·	1.5 km	MPC · JPL
795910	2008 UM_{391}	—	October 23, 2008	Kitt Peak	Spacewatch	THM	1.4 km	MPC · JPL
795911	2008 UH_{395}	—	October 27, 2008	Mount Lemmon	Mount Lemmon Survey	·	1.2 km	MPC · JPL
795912	2008 UM_{398}	—	January 5, 2017	Mount Lemmon	Mount Lemmon Survey	·	1.0 km	MPC · JPL
795913	2008 US_{398}	—	October 28, 2008	Kitt Peak	Spacewatch	·	2.3 km	MPC · JPL
795914	2008 UZ_{399}	—	February 5, 2016	Haleakala	Pan-STARRS 1	·	1.8 km	MPC · JPL
795915	2008 UR_{401}	—	February 6, 2016	Haleakala	Pan-STARRS 1	EOS	1.5 km	MPC · JPL
795916	2008 UH_{403}	—	October 29, 2008	Kitt Peak	Spacewatch	·	1.0 km	MPC · JPL
795917	2008 UF_{404}	—	October 27, 2008	Kitt Peak	Spacewatch	·	1.4 km	MPC · JPL
795918	2008 UT_{404}	—	October 27, 2008	Kitt Peak	Spacewatch	·	1.5 km	MPC · JPL
795919	2008 UV_{407}	—	October 20, 2008	Mount Lemmon	Mount Lemmon Survey	·	1.4 km	MPC · JPL
795920	2008 UQ_{408}	—	October 28, 2008	Kitt Peak	Spacewatch	·	820 m	MPC · JPL
795921	2008 UR_{408}	—	October 20, 2008	Mount Lemmon	Mount Lemmon Survey	·	1.1 km	MPC · JPL
795922	2008 UN_{409}	—	October 28, 2008	Mount Lemmon	Mount Lemmon Survey	EOS	1.4 km	MPC · JPL
795923	2008 UD_{415}	—	October 29, 2008	Kitt Peak	Spacewatch	·	1.0 km	MPC · JPL
795924	2008 UT_{420}	—	October 27, 2008	Mount Lemmon	Mount Lemmon Survey	·	1.2 km	MPC · JPL
795925	2008 UD_{421}	—	October 28, 2008	Kitt Peak	Spacewatch	·	970 m	MPC · JPL
795926	2008 UB_{424}	—	October 27, 2008	Kitt Peak	Spacewatch	·	1.3 km	MPC · JPL
795927	2008 UH_{425}	—	October 27, 2008	Kitt Peak	Spacewatch	·	1.2 km	MPC · JPL
795928	2008 UR_{426}	—	September 14, 2013	Haleakala	Pan-STARRS 1	BRA	910 m	MPC · JPL
795929	2008 UB_{427}	—	October 28, 2008	Mount Lemmon	Mount Lemmon Survey	KOR	940 m	MPC · JPL
795930	2008 UE_{427}	—	October 28, 2008	Mount Lemmon	Mount Lemmon Survey	·	1.2 km	MPC · JPL
795931	2008 UQ_{428}	—	October 20, 2008	Mount Lemmon	Mount Lemmon Survey	·	1.7 km	MPC · JPL
795932	2008 VQ_{32}	—	November 2, 2008	Mount Lemmon	Mount Lemmon Survey	·	1.6 km	MPC · JPL
795933	2008 VX_{32}	—	November 2, 2008	Mount Lemmon	Mount Lemmon Survey	DOR	1.9 km	MPC · JPL
795934	2008 VL_{36}	—	November 2, 2008	Mount Lemmon	Mount Lemmon Survey	·	940 m	MPC · JPL
795935	2008 VN_{44}	—	November 3, 2008	Mount Lemmon	Mount Lemmon Survey	·	1.5 km	MPC · JPL
795936	2008 VJ_{54}	—	November 6, 2008	Mount Lemmon	Mount Lemmon Survey	·	2.0 km	MPC · JPL
795937	2008 VF_{65}	—	October 15, 2017	Mount Lemmon	Mount Lemmon Survey	·	1.0 km	MPC · JPL
795938	2008 VE_{86}	—	November 6, 2008	Kitt Peak	Spacewatch	TIN	780 m	MPC · JPL
795939	2008 VH_{88}	—	August 9, 2013	Kitt Peak	Spacewatch	·	2.3 km	MPC · JPL
795940	2008 VK_{93}	—	January 17, 2015	Haleakala	Pan-STARRS 1	EOS	1.3 km	MPC · JPL
795941	2008 VJ_{95}	—	January 23, 2014	Mount Lemmon	Mount Lemmon Survey	·	1.1 km	MPC · JPL
795942	2008 VZ_{97}	—	November 3, 2008	Mount Lemmon	Mount Lemmon Survey	·	1.3 km	MPC · JPL
795943	2008 VS_{99}	—	November 3, 2008	Kitt Peak	Spacewatch	KOR	960 m	MPC · JPL
795944	2008 VB_{100}	—	November 1, 2008	Mount Lemmon	Mount Lemmon Survey	KOR	1.1 km	MPC · JPL
795945	2008 VR_{103}	—	November 1, 2008	Mount Lemmon	Mount Lemmon Survey	KOR	1.0 km	MPC · JPL
795946	2008 VY_{103}	—	November 9, 2008	Kitt Peak	Spacewatch	·	1.7 km	MPC · JPL
795947	2008 VU_{104}	—	November 6, 2008	Kitt Peak	Spacewatch	615	1.0 km	MPC · JPL
795948	2008 VF_{108}	—	November 1, 2008	Mount Lemmon	Mount Lemmon Survey	VER	1.9 km	MPC · JPL
795949	2008 VQ_{108}	—	November 2, 2008	Kitt Peak	Spacewatch	·	1.2 km	MPC · JPL
795950	2008 VX_{108}	—	November 8, 2008	Mount Lemmon	Mount Lemmon Survey	·	1.3 km	MPC · JPL
795951	2008 VF_{111}	—	November 2, 2008	Mount Lemmon	Mount Lemmon Survey	·	1.8 km	MPC · JPL
795952	2008 WG_{3}	—	October 6, 2008	Kitt Peak	Spacewatch	·	2.4 km	MPC · JPL
795953	2008 WR_{9}	—	November 2, 2008	Kitt Peak	Spacewatch	·	2.1 km	MPC · JPL
795954	2008 WX_{17}	—	October 28, 2008	Kitt Peak	Spacewatch	·	910 m	MPC · JPL
795955	2008 WC_{30}	—	November 19, 2008	Mount Lemmon	Mount Lemmon Survey	·	440 m	MPC · JPL
795956	2008 WT_{36}	—	November 17, 2008	Kitt Peak	Spacewatch	EOS	1.1 km	MPC · JPL
795957	2008 WQ_{51}	—	October 24, 2008	Kitt Peak	Spacewatch	NYS	800 m	MPC · JPL
795958	2008 WY_{56}	—	November 20, 2008	Mount Lemmon	Mount Lemmon Survey	KOR	850 m	MPC · JPL
795959	2008 WR_{73}	—	November 19, 2008	Mount Lemmon	Mount Lemmon Survey	MAS	600 m	MPC · JPL
795960	2008 WN_{75}	—	November 20, 2008	Kitt Peak	Spacewatch	·	2.4 km	MPC · JPL
795961	2008 WQ_{75}	—	November 20, 2008	Kitt Peak	Spacewatch	HOF	1.8 km	MPC · JPL
795962	2008 WW_{81}	—	November 20, 2008	Kitt Peak	Spacewatch	·	1.1 km	MPC · JPL
795963	2008 WP_{93}	—	November 22, 2008	Mount Lemmon	Mount Lemmon Survey	·	1.4 km	MPC · JPL
795964	2008 WD_{96}	—	November 30, 2008	Kitt Peak	Spacewatch	H	420 m	MPC · JPL
795965	2008 WC_{104}	—	November 21, 2008	Kitt Peak	Spacewatch	·	1.8 km	MPC · JPL
795966	2008 WZ_{112}	—	November 30, 2008	Kitt Peak	Spacewatch	·	1.4 km	MPC · JPL
795967	2008 WJ_{152}	—	November 21, 2008	Kitt Peak	Spacewatch	·	1.1 km	MPC · JPL
795968	2008 WX_{152}	—	February 10, 2016	Haleakala	Pan-STARRS 1	·	2.5 km	MPC · JPL
795969	2008 WT_{157}	—	November 20, 2008	Kitt Peak	Spacewatch	·	1.4 km	MPC · JPL
795970	2008 WH_{161}	—	November 19, 2008	Kitt Peak	Spacewatch	·	1.4 km	MPC · JPL
795971	2008 WC_{165}	—	November 30, 2008	Kitt Peak	Spacewatch	·	1.0 km	MPC · JPL
795972	2008 WS_{165}	—	November 20, 2008	Kitt Peak	Spacewatch	·	970 m	MPC · JPL
795973	2008 WV_{165}	—	November 20, 2008	Mount Lemmon	Mount Lemmon Survey	·	880 m	MPC · JPL
795974	2008 WU_{166}	—	February 6, 2016	Haleakala	Pan-STARRS 1	·	1.3 km	MPC · JPL
795975	2008 WG_{167}	—	November 20, 2008	Kitt Peak	Spacewatch	·	1.4 km	MPC · JPL
795976	2008 WW_{167}	—	November 19, 2008	Kitt Peak	Spacewatch	·	1.2 km	MPC · JPL
795977	2008 WC_{168}	—	November 25, 2008	Mauna Kea	P. A. Wiegert	·	1.3 km	MPC · JPL
795978	2008 XA_{9}	—	December 1, 2008	Mount Lemmon	Mount Lemmon Survey	·	1.2 km	MPC · JPL
795979	2008 XF_{12}	—	December 2, 2008	Mount Lemmon	Mount Lemmon Survey	·	620 m	MPC · JPL
795980	2008 XO_{16}	—	December 1, 2008	Kitt Peak	Spacewatch	·	1.4 km	MPC · JPL
795981	2008 XL_{28}	—	December 4, 2008	Mount Lemmon	Mount Lemmon Survey	·	1.4 km	MPC · JPL
795982	2008 XM_{29}	—	December 5, 2008	Mount Lemmon	Mount Lemmon Survey	·	1.5 km	MPC · JPL
795983	2008 XT_{34}	—	December 2, 2008	Kitt Peak	Spacewatch	·	2.4 km	MPC · JPL
795984	2008 XY_{53}	—	December 1, 2008	Kitt Peak	Spacewatch	H	510 m	MPC · JPL
795985	2008 XH_{58}	—	June 22, 2011	Mount Lemmon	Mount Lemmon Survey	MAS	710 m	MPC · JPL
795986	2008 XF_{60}	—	August 20, 2017	Haleakala	Pan-STARRS 1	MRX	900 m	MPC · JPL
795987	2008 XN_{64}	—	September 18, 2017	Haleakala	Pan-STARRS 1	·	1.6 km	MPC · JPL
795988	2008 XV_{64}	—	April 1, 2014	Kitt Peak	Spacewatch	·	1.3 km	MPC · JPL
795989	2008 XU_{67}	—	November 20, 2004	Kitt Peak	Spacewatch	·	730 m	MPC · JPL
795990	2008 XR_{68}	—	December 5, 2008	Mount Lemmon	Mount Lemmon Survey	·	1.1 km	MPC · JPL
795991	2008 XC_{69}	—	December 4, 2008	Mount Lemmon	Mount Lemmon Survey	·	1.2 km	MPC · JPL
795992	2008 XV_{70}	—	December 4, 2008	Kitt Peak	Spacewatch	·	1.1 km	MPC · JPL
795993	2008 YH_{19}	—	December 21, 2008	Mount Lemmon	Mount Lemmon Survey	H	400 m	MPC · JPL
795994	2008 YS_{27}	—	December 29, 2008	Mount Lemmon	Mount Lemmon Survey	AMO · APO · PHA	200 m	MPC · JPL
795995	2008 YX_{32}	—	December 31, 2008	Catalina	CSS	APO	240 m	MPC · JPL
795996	2008 YH_{35}	—	November 24, 2008	Mount Lemmon	Mount Lemmon Survey	·	1.4 km	MPC · JPL
795997	2008 YR_{43}	—	November 30, 2008	Mount Lemmon	Mount Lemmon Survey	·	1.6 km	MPC · JPL
795998	2008 YY_{48}	—	December 22, 2008	Kitt Peak	Spacewatch	·	1.4 km	MPC · JPL
795999	2008 YY_{51}	—	December 29, 2008	Mount Lemmon	Mount Lemmon Survey	·	1.3 km	MPC · JPL
796000	2008 YZ_{55}	—	December 30, 2008	Kitt Peak	Spacewatch	HOF	2.0 km	MPC · JPL

back to top
