= List of minor planets: 766001–767000 =

The following is a partial list of minor planets, running from minor-planet number 766001 through 767000, inclusive. The primary data for this and other partial lists is based on JPL's "Small-Body Orbital Elements" and data available from the Minor Planet Center. Critical list information is also provided by the MPC, unless otherwise specified from Lowell Observatory. A detailed description of the table's columns and additional sources are given on the main page including a complete list of every page in this series, and a statistical break-up on the dynamical classification of minor planets.

Also see the summary list of all named bodies in numerical and alphabetical order, and the corresponding naming citations for the number range of this particular list. New namings may only be added to this list after official publication, as the preannouncement of names is condemned by the Working Group for Small Bodies Nomenclature of the International Astronomical Union.

Near-Earth obj.	MBA (inner)	MBA (outer)	Centaur
Mars-crosser	MBA (middle)	Jupiter trojan	Trans-Neptunian obj.
Unclassified

== 766001–766100 ==
Designation			Discovery			Properties		Ref
Permanent	Provisional	Named after	Date	Site	Discoverer(s)	Category	Diam.	Ref
766001	2014 DP_{172}	—	February 24, 2014	Haleakala	Pan-STARRS 1	·	2.3 km	MPC · JPL
766002	2014 DY_{174}	—	February 26, 2014	Haleakala	Pan-STARRS 1	·	820 m	MPC · JPL
766003	2014 DA_{175}	—	February 28, 2014	Haleakala	Pan-STARRS 1	·	1.2 km	MPC · JPL
766004	2014 DN_{175}	—	February 21, 2014	Mount Lemmon	Mount Lemmon Survey	·	1.0 km	MPC · JPL
766005	2014 DR_{176}	—	February 28, 2014	Haleakala	Pan-STARRS 1	·	2.3 km	MPC · JPL
766006	2014 DQ_{178}	—	February 26, 2014	Mount Lemmon	Mount Lemmon Survey	·	840 m	MPC · JPL
766007	2014 DK_{179}	—	February 28, 2014	Haleakala	Pan-STARRS 1	L4	6.5 km	MPC · JPL
766008	2014 DA_{180}	—	February 26, 2014	Haleakala	Pan-STARRS 1	(5)	800 m	MPC · JPL
766009	2014 DM_{180}	—	February 19, 2014	Kitt Peak	Spacewatch	·	2.4 km	MPC · JPL
766010	2014 DK_{181}	—	February 28, 2014	Haleakala	Pan-STARRS 1	·	1.2 km	MPC · JPL
766011	2014 DO_{181}	—	February 22, 2014	Mount Lemmon	Mount Lemmon Survey	·	1.3 km	MPC · JPL
766012	2014 DB_{182}	—	February 28, 2014	Haleakala	Pan-STARRS 1	·	840 m	MPC · JPL
766013	2014 DM_{182}	—	February 24, 2014	Haleakala	Pan-STARRS 1	·	630 m	MPC · JPL
766014	2014 DS_{182}	—	April 7, 2021	Haleakala	Pan-STARRS 1	·	2.6 km	MPC · JPL
766015	2014 DO_{183}	—	February 26, 2014	Haleakala	Pan-STARRS 1	·	620 m	MPC · JPL
766016	2014 DH_{184}	—	October 9, 2012	Mount Lemmon	Mount Lemmon Survey	·	1.7 km	MPC · JPL
766017	2014 DF_{186}	—	February 24, 2014	Haleakala	Pan-STARRS 1	·	2.5 km	MPC · JPL
766018	2014 DQ_{187}	—	February 26, 2014	Mount Lemmon	Mount Lemmon Survey	L4	6.1 km	MPC · JPL
766019	2014 DT_{189}	—	February 21, 2014	Kitt Peak	Spacewatch	L4	6.8 km	MPC · JPL
766020	2014 DN_{190}	—	February 28, 2014	Haleakala	Pan-STARRS 1	L4	6.7 km	MPC · JPL
766021	2014 DP_{190}	—	February 28, 2014	Haleakala	Pan-STARRS 1	L4	6.2 km	MPC · JPL
766022	2014 DA_{191}	—	February 26, 2014	Haleakala	Pan-STARRS 1	L4	6.5 km	MPC · JPL
766023	2014 DR_{191}	—	February 28, 2014	Haleakala	Pan-STARRS 1	L4	6.9 km	MPC · JPL
766024	2014 DX_{191}	—	February 27, 2014	Haleakala	Pan-STARRS 1	·	2.0 km	MPC · JPL
766025	2014 DB_{192}	—	February 28, 2014	Haleakala	Pan-STARRS 1	·	1.3 km	MPC · JPL
766026	2014 DC_{194}	—	December 28, 2011	Mount Lemmon	Mount Lemmon Survey	L4	6.7 km	MPC · JPL
766027	2014 DX_{194}	—	February 27, 2014	Mount Lemmon	Mount Lemmon Survey	·	2.2 km	MPC · JPL
766028	2014 DZ_{195}	—	September 28, 2003	Apache Point	SDSS	MAR	760 m	MPC · JPL
766029	2014 DO_{200}	—	February 18, 2014	Mount Lemmon	Mount Lemmon Survey	·	2.2 km	MPC · JPL
766030	2014 DL_{202}	—	February 26, 2014	Haleakala	Pan-STARRS 1	L4	6.0 km	MPC · JPL
766031	2014 EA_{3}	—	March 5, 2014	Haleakala	Pan-STARRS 1	·	880 m	MPC · JPL
766032	2014 ED_{3}	—	March 5, 2014	Haleakala	Pan-STARRS 1	·	930 m	MPC · JPL
766033	2014 EV_{6}	—	February 28, 2014	Haleakala	Pan-STARRS 1	·	1.0 km	MPC · JPL
766034	2014 ET_{8}	—	September 25, 2006	Kitt Peak	Spacewatch	EUP	2.4 km	MPC · JPL
766035	2014 ES_{9}	—	January 5, 2013	Mount Lemmon	Mount Lemmon Survey	L4	6.4 km	MPC · JPL
766036	2014 EA_{17}	—	February 28, 2014	Haleakala	Pan-STARRS 1	EUN	810 m	MPC · JPL
766037	2014 EV_{17}	—	February 25, 2014	Kitt Peak	Spacewatch	HYG	2.1 km	MPC · JPL
766038	2014 EO_{22}	—	February 28, 2014	Haleakala	Pan-STARRS 1	L4	5.7 km	MPC · JPL
766039	2014 EF_{27}	—	February 26, 2014	Haleakala	Pan-STARRS 1	NYS	950 m	MPC · JPL
766040	2014 ED_{28}	—	February 22, 2007	Catalina	CSS	·	1.1 km	MPC · JPL
766041	2014 EN_{30}	—	February 26, 2014	Haleakala	Pan-STARRS 1	TIR	2.1 km	MPC · JPL
766042	2014 EH_{43}	—	August 10, 2007	Kitt Peak	Spacewatch	HNS	820 m	MPC · JPL
766043	2014 EP_{46}	—	February 9, 2008	Mount Lemmon	Mount Lemmon Survey	·	2.2 km	MPC · JPL
766044	2014 EO_{50}	—	October 18, 2012	Haleakala	Pan-STARRS 1	·	2.5 km	MPC · JPL
766045	2014 ED_{55}	—	January 18, 2013	Mount Lemmon	Mount Lemmon Survey	L4	6.6 km	MPC · JPL
766046	2014 EF_{55}	—	May 14, 2015	Haleakala	Pan-STARRS 1	·	1.8 km	MPC · JPL
766047	2014 EK_{55}	—	March 20, 2015	Haleakala	Pan-STARRS 1	L4	6.0 km	MPC · JPL
766048	2014 ET_{90}	—	January 20, 2013	Mount Lemmon	Mount Lemmon Survey	L4	5.7 km	MPC · JPL
766049	2014 ET_{99}	—	September 29, 2011	Mount Lemmon	Mount Lemmon Survey	VER	1.9 km	MPC · JPL
766050	2014 EL_{101}	—	July 25, 2015	Haleakala	Pan-STARRS 1	·	990 m	MPC · JPL
766051	2014 EM_{102}	—	September 9, 2015	Haleakala	Pan-STARRS 1	·	840 m	MPC · JPL
766052	2014 EV_{104}	—	August 24, 2017	Haleakala	Pan-STARRS 1	·	2.2 km	MPC · JPL
766053	2014 EG_{108}	—	October 28, 2017	Mount Lemmon	Mount Lemmon Survey	EOS	1.3 km	MPC · JPL
766054	2014 EL_{108}	—	June 19, 2015	Haleakala	Pan-STARRS 1	·	1.2 km	MPC · JPL
766055	2014 EB_{117}	—	March 3, 2014	Cerro Tololo	High Cadence Transient Survey	RAF	620 m	MPC · JPL
766056	2014 EP_{122}	—	September 28, 2008	Mount Lemmon	Mount Lemmon Survey	L4	5.3 km	MPC · JPL
766057	2014 EB_{125}	—	November 13, 2017	Haleakala	Pan-STARRS 1	·	1.3 km	MPC · JPL
766058	2014 EU_{129}	—	May 20, 2015	Cerro Tololo	DECam	·	1.4 km	MPC · JPL
766059	2014 EK_{131}	—	July 24, 2015	Haleakala	Pan-STARRS 1	MAR	780 m	MPC · JPL
766060	2014 EM_{133}	—	March 3, 2014	Cerro Tololo	High Cadence Transient Survey	·	910 m	MPC · JPL
766061	2014 EC_{134}	—	June 3, 2002	La Silla	A. Boattini	·	830 m	MPC · JPL
766062	2014 EC_{136}	—	December 5, 2016	Mount Lemmon	Mount Lemmon Survey	·	1.0 km	MPC · JPL
766063	2014 EU_{139}	—	July 5, 2016	Mount Lemmon	Mount Lemmon Survey	·	2.3 km	MPC · JPL
766064	2014 EH_{142}	—	September 9, 2015	Haleakala	Pan-STARRS 1	·	1.2 km	MPC · JPL
766065	2014 EX_{142}	—	August 28, 2016	Mount Lemmon	Mount Lemmon Survey	·	1.8 km	MPC · JPL
766066	2014 EU_{146}	—	February 28, 2014	Haleakala	Pan-STARRS 1	L4	6.6 km	MPC · JPL
766067	2014 EY_{156}	—	October 27, 2017	Mount Lemmon	Mount Lemmon Survey	VER	1.9 km	MPC · JPL
766068	2014 EQ_{168}	—	October 23, 2011	Mount Lemmon	Mount Lemmon Survey	·	2.1 km	MPC · JPL
766069	2014 EL_{173}	—	January 3, 2014	Mount Lemmon	Mount Lemmon Survey	·	2.4 km	MPC · JPL
766070	2014 EV_{177}	—	October 13, 2010	Mount Lemmon	Mount Lemmon Survey	L4 · ERY	5.4 km	MPC · JPL
766071	2014 EA_{183}	—	September 29, 2011	Mount Lemmon	Mount Lemmon Survey	·	2.7 km	MPC · JPL
766072	2014 EC_{190}	—	March 4, 2014	Cerro Tololo	High Cadence Transient Survey	L4	5.9 km	MPC · JPL
766073	2014 EF_{191}	—	June 13, 2015	Mount Lemmon	Mount Lemmon Survey	·	1.2 km	MPC · JPL
766074	2014 EK_{191}	—	May 21, 2015	Haleakala	Pan-STARRS 1	·	1.5 km	MPC · JPL
766075	2014 EO_{192}	—	March 4, 2014	Cerro Tololo	High Cadence Transient Survey	L4	6.6 km	MPC · JPL
766076	2014 EF_{201}	—	June 12, 2015	Haleakala	Pan-STARRS 1	·	950 m	MPC · JPL
766077	2014 EA_{203}	—	September 13, 2007	Kitt Peak	Spacewatch	·	730 m	MPC · JPL
766078	2014 EN_{203}	—	March 7, 2014	Mount Lemmon	Mount Lemmon Survey	LIX	2.6 km	MPC · JPL
766079	2014 EV_{205}	—	November 27, 2017	Mount Lemmon	Mount Lemmon Survey	EOS	1.5 km	MPC · JPL
766080	2014 ET_{206}	—	March 5, 2014	Cerro Tololo	High Cadence Transient Survey	L4	6.9 km	MPC · JPL
766081	2014 EA_{210}	—	November 7, 2012	Mount Lemmon	Mount Lemmon Survey	·	1.8 km	MPC · JPL
766082	2014 EN_{215}	—	January 22, 2015	Haleakala	Pan-STARRS 1	L4	7.1 km	MPC · JPL
766083	2014 EJ_{217}	—	November 1, 2010	Mount Lemmon	Mount Lemmon Survey	L4	6.3 km	MPC · JPL
766084	2014 ER_{224}	—	December 6, 2012	Mount Lemmon	Mount Lemmon Survey	·	1.9 km	MPC · JPL
766085	2014 EK_{227}	—	December 23, 2012	Haleakala	Pan-STARRS 1	L4	5.9 km	MPC · JPL
766086	2014 EW_{239}	—	March 5, 2014	Cerro Tololo	High Cadence Transient Survey	·	2.5 km	MPC · JPL
766087	2014 ET_{242}	—	February 3, 2013	Haleakala	Pan-STARRS 1	L4	6.3 km	MPC · JPL
766088	2014 EU_{246}	—	September 25, 2006	Mount Lemmon	Mount Lemmon Survey	·	1.4 km	MPC · JPL
766089	2014 EY_{251}	—	March 13, 2014	Mount Lemmon	Mount Lemmon Survey	·	1.6 km	MPC · JPL
766090	2014 ED_{252}	—	October 28, 2017	Haleakala	Pan-STARRS 1	·	2.6 km	MPC · JPL
766091	2014 EK_{253}	—	March 10, 2014	Mount Lemmon	Mount Lemmon Survey	·	2.1 km	MPC · JPL
766092	2014 EL_{253}	—	March 13, 2014	Mount Lemmon	Mount Lemmon Survey	·	2.7 km	MPC · JPL
766093	2014 EE_{254}	—	March 10, 2014	Mount Lemmon	Mount Lemmon Survey	(895)	3.1 km	MPC · JPL
766094	2014 EF_{254}	—	March 11, 2014	Mount Lemmon	Mount Lemmon Survey	URS	2.4 km	MPC · JPL
766095	2014 EH_{254}	—	March 6, 2014	Mount Lemmon	Mount Lemmon Survey	L4	6.9 km	MPC · JPL
766096	2014 ET_{254}	—	March 10, 2014	Mount Lemmon	Mount Lemmon Survey	EUN	780 m	MPC · JPL
766097	2014 EW_{254}	—	March 10, 2014	Mount Lemmon	Mount Lemmon Survey	·	2.6 km	MPC · JPL
766098	2014 EC_{257}	—	March 8, 2014	Mount Lemmon	Mount Lemmon Survey	TEL	1.2 km	MPC · JPL
766099	2014 FU_{1}	—	March 20, 2014	Mount Lemmon	Mount Lemmon Survey	·	2.6 km	MPC · JPL
766100	2014 FY_{8}	—	February 26, 2014	Haleakala	Pan-STARRS 1	·	2.4 km	MPC · JPL

== 766101–766200 ==
back to top

Designation			Discovery			Properties		Ref
Permanent	Provisional	Named after	Date	Site	Discoverer(s)	Category	Diam.	Ref
766101	2014 FL_{12}	—	February 27, 2014	Kitt Peak	Spacewatch	·	2.4 km	MPC · JPL
766102	2014 FH_{13}	—	March 20, 2014	Mount Lemmon	Mount Lemmon Survey	ADE	1.4 km	MPC · JPL
766103	2014 FO_{19}	—	February 28, 2014	Haleakala	Pan-STARRS 1	·	2.3 km	MPC · JPL
766104	2014 FM_{21}	—	January 12, 2008	Kitt Peak	Spacewatch	·	2.1 km	MPC · JPL
766105	2014 FH_{25}	—	February 28, 2014	Haleakala	Pan-STARRS 1	·	2.3 km	MPC · JPL
766106	2014 FU_{26}	—	February 12, 2008	Kitt Peak	Spacewatch	·	2.3 km	MPC · JPL
766107	2014 FM_{32}	—	January 11, 2008	Mount Lemmon	Mount Lemmon Survey	·	1.9 km	MPC · JPL
766108	2014 FK_{42}	—	February 15, 2010	Mount Lemmon	Mount Lemmon Survey	·	960 m	MPC · JPL
766109	2014 FS_{45}	—	February 28, 2014	Mount Lemmon	Mount Lemmon Survey	·	910 m	MPC · JPL
766110	2014 FH_{75}	—	March 24, 2014	Haleakala	Pan-STARRS 1	·	1.2 km	MPC · JPL
766111	2014 FJ_{79}	—	March 24, 2014	Haleakala	Pan-STARRS 1	V	510 m	MPC · JPL
766112	2014 FK_{79}	—	April 25, 2015	Haleakala	Pan-STARRS 1	·	2.8 km	MPC · JPL
766113	2014 FU_{81}	—	March 24, 2014	Haleakala	Pan-STARRS 1	L4 · (8060)	6.6 km	MPC · JPL
766114	2014 FF_{82}	—	March 31, 2014	Mount Lemmon	Mount Lemmon Survey	·	2.6 km	MPC · JPL
766115	2014 FV_{82}	—	March 22, 2014	Mount Lemmon	Mount Lemmon Survey	EUN	860 m	MPC · JPL
766116	2014 FC_{83}	—	March 24, 2014	Haleakala	Pan-STARRS 1	·	2.5 km	MPC · JPL
766117	2014 FM_{83}	—	March 22, 2014	Mount Lemmon	Mount Lemmon Survey	·	2.1 km	MPC · JPL
766118	2014 FO_{84}	—	March 28, 2014	Mount Lemmon	Mount Lemmon Survey	·	2.1 km	MPC · JPL
766119	2014 FR_{84}	—	March 31, 2014	Mount Lemmon	Mount Lemmon Survey	·	1.4 km	MPC · JPL
766120	2014 FN_{85}	—	March 31, 2014	Mount Lemmon	Mount Lemmon Survey	·	1.1 km	MPC · JPL
766121	2014 FV_{86}	—	March 28, 2014	Mount Lemmon	Mount Lemmon Survey	·	810 m	MPC · JPL
766122	2014 GN_{2}	—	November 12, 2012	Mount Lemmon	Mount Lemmon Survey	·	1.3 km	MPC · JPL
766123	2014 GT_{2}	—	March 25, 2014	Kitt Peak	Spacewatch	BRG	1.2 km	MPC · JPL
766124	2014 GD_{11}	—	February 26, 2014	Haleakala	Pan-STARRS 1	L4	6.8 km	MPC · JPL
766125	2014 GW_{11}	—	October 20, 2007	Mount Lemmon	Mount Lemmon Survey	HOF	2.0 km	MPC · JPL
766126	2014 GM_{19}	—	April 4, 2014	Mount Lemmon	Mount Lemmon Survey	·	1.1 km	MPC · JPL
766127	2014 GU_{19}	—	April 4, 2014	Mount Lemmon	Mount Lemmon Survey	·	860 m	MPC · JPL
766128	2014 GZ_{23}	—	May 24, 2011	Haleakala	Pan-STARRS 1	·	570 m	MPC · JPL
766129	2014 GC_{27}	—	February 27, 2014	Haleakala	Pan-STARRS 1	PHO	870 m	MPC · JPL
766130	2014 GX_{37}	—	March 24, 2014	Haleakala	Pan-STARRS 1	·	1.0 km	MPC · JPL
766131	2014 GM_{41}	—	October 24, 2011	Haleakala	Pan-STARRS 1	·	930 m	MPC · JPL
766132	2014 GO_{41}	—	March 28, 2014	Kitt Peak	Spacewatch	HNS	900 m	MPC · JPL
766133	2014 GD_{42}	—	March 28, 2014	Kitt Peak	Spacewatch	(895)	3.0 km	MPC · JPL
766134	2014 GN_{50}	—	May 24, 2006	Kitt Peak	Spacewatch	·	1.1 km	MPC · JPL
766135	2014 GU_{50}	—	March 22, 2014	Mount Lemmon	Mount Lemmon Survey	·	1.9 km	MPC · JPL
766136	2014 GS_{51}	—	November 13, 2012	Mount Lemmon	Mount Lemmon Survey	·	1.1 km	MPC · JPL
766137	2014 GP_{54}	—	April 4, 2014	Haleakala	Pan-STARRS 1	H	400 m	MPC · JPL
766138	2014 GG_{59}	—	April 5, 2014	Haleakala	Pan-STARRS 1	·	1.3 km	MPC · JPL
766139	2014 GK_{60}	—	April 4, 2014	Haleakala	Pan-STARRS 1	·	2.1 km	MPC · JPL
766140	2014 GR_{60}	—	October 18, 2011	Mount Lemmon	Mount Lemmon Survey	·	2.3 km	MPC · JPL
766141	2014 GK_{61}	—	April 5, 2014	Haleakala	Pan-STARRS 1	·	1.0 km	MPC · JPL
766142	2014 GZ_{61}	—	April 5, 2014	Haleakala	Pan-STARRS 1	·	960 m	MPC · JPL
766143	2014 GL_{63}	—	April 5, 2014	Haleakala	Pan-STARRS 1	·	800 m	MPC · JPL
766144	2014 GH_{64}	—	April 8, 2014	Kitt Peak	Spacewatch	·	560 m	MPC · JPL
766145	2014 GJ_{64}	—	April 8, 2014	Haleakala	Pan-STARRS 1	MAR	830 m	MPC · JPL
766146	2014 GR_{64}	—	April 10, 2014	Haleakala	Pan-STARRS 1	EUN	910 m	MPC · JPL
766147	2014 GE_{66}	—	April 5, 2014	Haleakala	Pan-STARRS 1	·	2.6 km	MPC · JPL
766148	2014 GX_{66}	—	April 7, 2014	Mount Lemmon	Mount Lemmon Survey	·	960 m	MPC · JPL
766149	2014 GK_{67}	—	April 8, 2014	Mount Lemmon	Mount Lemmon Survey	·	1.1 km	MPC · JPL
766150	2014 GM_{67}	—	April 5, 2014	Haleakala	Pan-STARRS 1	·	910 m	MPC · JPL
766151	2014 GB_{68}	—	April 10, 2014	Haleakala	Pan-STARRS 1	·	1.1 km	MPC · JPL
766152	2014 GX_{68}	—	April 10, 2014	Haleakala	Pan-STARRS 1	·	1.2 km	MPC · JPL
766153	2014 GV_{69}	—	April 5, 2014	Haleakala	Pan-STARRS 1	·	1.4 km	MPC · JPL
766154	2014 GO_{71}	—	April 10, 2014	Haleakala	Pan-STARRS 1	·	1.0 km	MPC · JPL
766155	2014 GM_{72}	—	April 9, 2014	Mount Lemmon	Mount Lemmon Survey	·	2.2 km	MPC · JPL
766156	2014 GU_{73}	—	April 5, 2014	Haleakala	Pan-STARRS 1	·	790 m	MPC · JPL
766157	2014 GX_{73}	—	April 5, 2014	Haleakala	Pan-STARRS 1	·	950 m	MPC · JPL
766158	2014 GY_{74}	—	April 8, 2014	Haleakala	Pan-STARRS 1	·	1 km	MPC · JPL
766159	2014 GJ_{75}	—	April 9, 2014	Haleakala	Pan-STARRS 1	EUN	850 m	MPC · JPL
766160	2014 GK_{75}	—	April 9, 2014	Mount Lemmon	Mount Lemmon Survey	·	2.7 km	MPC · JPL
766161	2014 GN_{77}	—	April 5, 2014	Haleakala	Pan-STARRS 1	EOS	1.4 km	MPC · JPL
766162	2014 GU_{77}	—	April 5, 2014	Haleakala	Pan-STARRS 1	URS	2.6 km	MPC · JPL
766163	2014 GJ_{79}	—	April 1, 2014	Kitt Peak	Spacewatch	·	2.8 km	MPC · JPL
766164	2014 GW_{80}	—	April 5, 2014	Haleakala	Pan-STARRS 1	·	1.0 km	MPC · JPL
766165	2014 GE_{81}	—	April 8, 2014	Mount Lemmon	Mount Lemmon Survey	MAR	690 m	MPC · JPL
766166	2014 GP_{81}	—	April 11, 2007	Mount Lemmon	Mount Lemmon Survey	·	3.2 km	MPC · JPL
766167	2014 GC_{89}	—	April 5, 2014	Haleakala	Pan-STARRS 1	·	1.2 km	MPC · JPL
766168	2014 GD_{89}	—	April 5, 2014	Haleakala	Pan-STARRS 1	EUN	810 m	MPC · JPL
766169	2014 GN_{89}	—	April 2, 2014	Mount Lemmon	Mount Lemmon Survey	·	1.1 km	MPC · JPL
766170	2014 GP_{90}	—	April 5, 2014	Haleakala	Pan-STARRS 1	EUN	690 m	MPC · JPL
766171	2014 GF_{92}	—	April 5, 2014	Haleakala	Pan-STARRS 1	·	760 m	MPC · JPL
766172	2014 GJ_{94}	—	April 4, 2014	Kitt Peak	Spacewatch	·	2.9 km	MPC · JPL
766173	2014 GT_{97}	—	February 4, 2019	Haleakala	Pan-STARRS 2	·	2.3 km	MPC · JPL
766174	2014 GQ_{101}	—	April 4, 2014	Haleakala	Pan-STARRS 1	centaur	40 km	MPC · JPL
766175	2014 HJ_{1}	—	March 24, 2014	Haleakala	Pan-STARRS 1	·	1.5 km	MPC · JPL
766176	2014 HX_{5}	—	March 17, 2007	Kitt Peak	Spacewatch	·	690 m	MPC · JPL
766177	2014 HZ_{5}	—	April 1, 2014	Mount Lemmon	Mount Lemmon Survey	·	840 m	MPC · JPL
766178	2014 HV_{14}	—	April 21, 2014	Mount Lemmon	Mount Lemmon Survey	·	880 m	MPC · JPL
766179	2014 HC_{31}	—	March 25, 2014	Kitt Peak	Spacewatch	·	900 m	MPC · JPL
766180	2014 HA_{33}	—	October 28, 2008	Kitt Peak	Spacewatch	·	1.3 km	MPC · JPL
766181	2014 HE_{34}	—	November 8, 2007	Mount Lemmon	Mount Lemmon Survey	·	1.1 km	MPC · JPL
766182	2014 HW_{35}	—	March 25, 2014	Kitt Peak	Spacewatch	·	870 m	MPC · JPL
766183	2014 HT_{39}	—	April 24, 2014	Mount Lemmon	Mount Lemmon Survey	·	1.6 km	MPC · JPL
766184	2014 HD_{44}	—	April 4, 2014	Haleakala	Pan-STARRS 1	·	2.4 km	MPC · JPL
766185	2014 HX_{45}	—	March 25, 2014	Mount Lemmon	Mount Lemmon Survey	·	980 m	MPC · JPL
766186	2014 HU_{48}	—	April 5, 2014	Haleakala	Pan-STARRS 1	·	1.0 km	MPC · JPL
766187	2014 HY_{50}	—	March 31, 2014	Mount Lemmon	Mount Lemmon Survey	·	840 m	MPC · JPL
766188	2014 HP_{56}	—	September 19, 2012	Mount Lemmon	Mount Lemmon Survey	H	370 m	MPC · JPL
766189	2014 HM_{58}	—	September 13, 2007	Mount Lemmon	Mount Lemmon Survey	·	860 m	MPC · JPL
766190	2014 HU_{60}	—	April 23, 2014	Cerro Tololo-DECam	DECam	·	2.7 km	MPC · JPL
766191	2014 HW_{60}	—	April 4, 2014	Haleakala	Pan-STARRS 1	·	2.1 km	MPC · JPL
766192	2014 HL_{85}	—	April 23, 2014	Cerro Tololo-DECam	DECam	EOS	1.4 km	MPC · JPL
766193	2014 HW_{88}	—	October 11, 2016	Mount Lemmon	Mount Lemmon Survey	EOS	1.4 km	MPC · JPL
766194	2014 HG_{98}	—	October 12, 2016	Haleakala	Pan-STARRS 1	EOS	1.2 km	MPC · JPL
766195	2014 HM_{114}	—	April 24, 2014	Mount Lemmon	Mount Lemmon Survey	·	740 m	MPC · JPL
766196	2014 HB_{116}	—	April 23, 2014	Cerro Tololo-DECam	DECam	·	870 m	MPC · JPL
766197	2014 HA_{121}	—	April 23, 2014	Cerro Tololo-DECam	DECam	·	1.3 km	MPC · JPL
766198	2014 HQ_{121}	—	April 23, 2014	Cerro Tololo-DECam	DECam	·	2.1 km	MPC · JPL
766199	2014 HE_{130}	—	April 1, 2014	Mount Lemmon	Mount Lemmon Survey	H	410 m	MPC · JPL
766200	2014 HD_{133}	—	April 22, 2014	Mount Lemmon	Mount Lemmon Survey	·	1.1 km	MPC · JPL

== 766201–766300 ==
back to top

Designation			Discovery			Properties		Ref
Permanent	Provisional	Named after	Date	Site	Discoverer(s)	Category	Diam.	Ref
766201	2014 HH_{135}	—	March 13, 2010	Catalina	CSS	·	1.1 km	MPC · JPL
766202	2014 HO_{142}	—	April 5, 2014	Haleakala	Pan-STARRS 1	·	990 m	MPC · JPL
766203	2014 HQ_{142}	—	October 24, 2011	Haleakala	Pan-STARRS 1	·	1.4 km	MPC · JPL
766204	2014 HA_{152}	—	March 24, 2014	Haleakala	Pan-STARRS 1	·	950 m	MPC · JPL
766205	2014 HN_{152}	—	February 28, 2014	Haleakala	Pan-STARRS 1	·	940 m	MPC · JPL
766206	2014 HG_{163}	—	March 13, 2014	Kitt Peak	Spacewatch	·	2.2 km	MPC · JPL
766207	2014 HE_{169}	—	April 29, 2014	ESA OGS	ESA OGS	·	1.3 km	MPC · JPL
766208	2014 HZ_{169}	—	March 24, 2014	Haleakala	Pan-STARRS 1	·	1.1 km	MPC · JPL
766209	2014 HX_{173}	—	January 10, 2013	Haleakala	Pan-STARRS 1	·	1.8 km	MPC · JPL
766210	2014 HY_{174}	—	April 29, 2014	Haleakala	Pan-STARRS 1	·	1.3 km	MPC · JPL
766211	2014 HB_{175}	—	January 19, 2013	Mount Lemmon	Mount Lemmon Survey	·	1.4 km	MPC · JPL
766212	2014 HH_{180}	—	March 7, 2014	Kitt Peak	Spacewatch	·	1.5 km	MPC · JPL
766213	2014 HZ_{183}	—	February 28, 2014	Haleakala	Pan-STARRS 1	·	1.4 km	MPC · JPL
766214	2014 HV_{187}	—	March 9, 2014	Haleakala	Pan-STARRS 1	(5)	1 km	MPC · JPL
766215	2014 HV_{202}	—	May 4, 2005	Mount Lemmon	Mount Lemmon Survey	·	1.2 km	MPC · JPL
766216	2014 HH_{203}	—	April 30, 2014	Haleakala	Pan-STARRS 1	·	1.5 km	MPC · JPL
766217	2014 HS_{203}	—	April 4, 2014	Mount Lemmon	Mount Lemmon Survey	·	940 m	MPC · JPL
766218	2014 HX_{203}	—	April 30, 2014	Haleakala	Pan-STARRS 1	KOR	1.1 km	MPC · JPL
766219	2014 HM_{205}	—	February 5, 2013	Mount Lemmon	Mount Lemmon Survey	·	2.5 km	MPC · JPL
766220	2014 HM_{206}	—	April 29, 2014	Haleakala	Pan-STARRS 1	·	900 m	MPC · JPL
766221	2014 HS_{206}	—	May 11, 2010	Mount Lemmon	Mount Lemmon Survey	·	1.0 km	MPC · JPL
766222	2014 HH_{207}	—	April 30, 2014	Haleakala	Pan-STARRS 1	·	940 m	MPC · JPL
766223	2014 HG_{212}	—	April 29, 2014	Haleakala	Pan-STARRS 1	JUN	830 m	MPC · JPL
766224	2014 HK_{212}	—	April 23, 2014	Haleakala	Pan-STARRS 1	KON	1.8 km	MPC · JPL
766225	2014 HA_{213}	—	April 24, 2014	Haleakala	Pan-STARRS 1	·	910 m	MPC · JPL
766226	2014 HP_{213}	—	April 24, 2014	Mount Lemmon	Mount Lemmon Survey	·	1.2 km	MPC · JPL
766227	2014 HT_{214}	—	April 28, 2014	Haleakala	Pan-STARRS 1	·	1.1 km	MPC · JPL
766228	2014 HQ_{215}	—	April 25, 2014	Mount Lemmon	Mount Lemmon Survey	KON	1.7 km	MPC · JPL
766229	2014 HY_{215}	—	April 15, 2018	Mount Lemmon	Mount Lemmon Survey	·	1.2 km	MPC · JPL
766230	2014 HZ_{216}	—	April 29, 2014	Haleakala	Pan-STARRS 1	·	950 m	MPC · JPL
766231	2014 HD_{217}	—	April 28, 2014	Haleakala	Pan-STARRS 1	·	1.0 km	MPC · JPL
766232	2014 HX_{217}	—	April 30, 2014	Haleakala	Pan-STARRS 1	·	1.3 km	MPC · JPL
766233	2014 HZ_{217}	—	July 25, 2015	Haleakala	Pan-STARRS 1	·	940 m	MPC · JPL
766234	2014 HD_{218}	—	December 5, 2016	Mount Lemmon	Mount Lemmon Survey	·	1.0 km	MPC · JPL
766235	2014 HD_{220}	—	April 29, 2014	Haleakala	Pan-STARRS 1	·	1.7 km	MPC · JPL
766236	2014 HQ_{221}	—	April 30, 2014	Haleakala	Pan-STARRS 1	·	2.3 km	MPC · JPL
766237	2014 HH_{225}	—	April 23, 2014	Haleakala	Pan-STARRS 1	·	1.1 km	MPC · JPL
766238	2014 HF_{227}	—	April 30, 2014	Haleakala	Pan-STARRS 1	·	1.2 km	MPC · JPL
766239	2014 HR_{228}	—	April 29, 2014	Haleakala	Pan-STARRS 1	·	950 m	MPC · JPL
766240	2014 HY_{228}	—	April 29, 2014	Haleakala	Pan-STARRS 1	·	900 m	MPC · JPL
766241	2014 HW_{229}	—	April 29, 2014	Haleakala	Pan-STARRS 1	·	1.5 km	MPC · JPL
766242	2014 HV_{231}	—	April 30, 2014	Haleakala	Pan-STARRS 1	·	1.4 km	MPC · JPL
766243	2014 HC_{239}	—	September 26, 2011	Haleakala	Pan-STARRS 1	·	880 m	MPC · JPL
766244	2014 HO_{249}	—	May 5, 2008	Mount Lemmon	Mount Lemmon Survey	·	2.6 km	MPC · JPL
766245	2014 HR_{282}	—	October 11, 2005	Kitt Peak	Spacewatch	·	1.6 km	MPC · JPL
766246	2014 HD_{296}	—	April 30, 2014	Haleakala	Pan-STARRS 1	·	1.4 km	MPC · JPL
766247	2014 JZ_{3}	—	April 5, 2014	Haleakala	Pan-STARRS 1	·	1.3 km	MPC · JPL
766248	2014 JV_{5}	—	August 31, 2007	Siding Spring	K. Sárneczky, L. Kiss	NYS	940 m	MPC · JPL
766249	2014 JU_{10}	—	May 3, 2014	Mount Lemmon	Mount Lemmon Survey	·	830 m	MPC · JPL
766250	2014 JZ_{13}	—	April 30, 2014	ESA OGS	ESA OGS	KON	1.6 km	MPC · JPL
766251	2014 JM_{14}	—	April 30, 2014	ESA OGS	ESA OGS	·	1.2 km	MPC · JPL
766252	2014 JT_{20}	—	May 3, 2014	Mount Lemmon	Mount Lemmon Survey	·	1.3 km	MPC · JPL
766253	2014 JO_{26}	—	April 24, 2014	Haleakala	Pan-STARRS 1	·	2.3 km	MPC · JPL
766254	2014 JW_{26}	—	February 28, 2014	Haleakala	Pan-STARRS 1	·	1.1 km	MPC · JPL
766255	2014 JO_{29}	—	May 6, 2014	Mount Lemmon	Mount Lemmon Survey	MAR	720 m	MPC · JPL
766256	2014 JG_{30}	—	April 25, 2014	Mount Lemmon	Mount Lemmon Survey	·	1.0 km	MPC · JPL
766257	2014 JV_{38}	—	May 4, 2014	Haleakala	Pan-STARRS 1	·	1.1 km	MPC · JPL
766258	2014 JO_{50}	—	May 2, 2014	Kitt Peak	Spacewatch	ADE	1.4 km	MPC · JPL
766259	2014 JX_{51}	—	May 1, 2014	Mount Lemmon	Mount Lemmon Survey	KON	1.6 km	MPC · JPL
766260	2014 JJ_{52}	—	January 7, 2010	Kitt Peak	Spacewatch	·	750 m	MPC · JPL
766261	2014 JC_{56}	—	February 22, 2014	Haleakala	Pan-STARRS 1	T_{j} (2.96)	2.7 km	MPC · JPL
766262	2014 JJ_{58}	—	May 4, 2014	Haleakala	Pan-STARRS 1	EUN	810 m	MPC · JPL
766263	2014 JH_{59}	—	October 14, 2010	Mount Lemmon	Mount Lemmon Survey	·	2.2 km	MPC · JPL
766264	2014 JG_{64}	—	May 3, 2014	Mount Lemmon	Mount Lemmon Survey	·	1.1 km	MPC · JPL
766265	2014 JL_{66}	—	April 29, 2006	Kitt Peak	Spacewatch	·	800 m	MPC · JPL
766266	2014 JR_{68}	—	October 24, 2011	Haleakala	Pan-STARRS 1	·	870 m	MPC · JPL
766267	2014 JT_{69}	—	January 17, 2013	Haleakala	Pan-STARRS 1	·	1.2 km	MPC · JPL
766268	2014 JG_{71}	—	April 30, 2014	Haleakala	Pan-STARRS 1	·	1.4 km	MPC · JPL
766269	2014 JC_{72}	—	November 6, 2007	Kitt Peak	Spacewatch	·	1.4 km	MPC · JPL
766270	2014 JZ_{73}	—	May 8, 2014	Haleakala	Pan-STARRS 1	·	1.2 km	MPC · JPL
766271	2014 JF_{75}	—	May 4, 2014	Haleakala	Pan-STARRS 1	·	880 m	MPC · JPL
766272	2014 JK_{75}	—	May 8, 2014	Haleakala	Pan-STARRS 1	MAR	840 m	MPC · JPL
766273	2014 JR_{76}	—	January 8, 2006	Mount Lemmon	Mount Lemmon Survey	·	3.1 km	MPC · JPL
766274	2014 JK_{79}	—	May 10, 2014	Haleakala	Pan-STARRS 1	·	1.4 km	MPC · JPL
766275	2014 JJ_{82}	—	May 3, 2014	Haleakala	Pan-STARRS 1	·	1.0 km	MPC · JPL
766276	2014 JW_{83}	—	May 4, 2014	Haleakala	Pan-STARRS 1	·	980 m	MPC · JPL
766277	2014 JN_{84}	—	October 23, 2011	Haleakala	Pan-STARRS 1	ADE	1.5 km	MPC · JPL
766278	2014 JW_{84}	—	May 8, 2014	Haleakala	Pan-STARRS 1	·	1.6 km	MPC · JPL
766279	2014 JE_{85}	—	March 25, 2010	Kitt Peak	Spacewatch	·	1.1 km	MPC · JPL
766280	2014 JD_{87}	—	November 18, 2003	Kitt Peak	Spacewatch	·	1.2 km	MPC · JPL
766281	2014 JT_{87}	—	May 2, 2014	Mount Lemmon	Mount Lemmon Survey	·	1.4 km	MPC · JPL
766282	2014 JF_{88}	—	May 4, 2014	Haleakala	Pan-STARRS 1	·	1.4 km	MPC · JPL
766283	2014 JJ_{88}	—	May 1, 2014	Mount Lemmon	Mount Lemmon Survey	·	1.2 km	MPC · JPL
766284	2014 JQ_{88}	—	May 4, 2014	Haleakala	Pan-STARRS 1	(5)	1 km	MPC · JPL
766285	2014 JS_{88}	—	May 4, 2014	Haleakala	Pan-STARRS 1	·	930 m	MPC · JPL
766286	2014 JH_{89}	—	May 6, 2014	Haleakala	Pan-STARRS 1	·	1.1 km	MPC · JPL
766287	2014 JX_{90}	—	May 9, 2014	Haleakala	Pan-STARRS 1	EUN	850 m	MPC · JPL
766288	2014 JQ_{91}	—	May 10, 2014	Haleakala	Pan-STARRS 1	·	920 m	MPC · JPL
766289	2014 JS_{91}	—	January 10, 2013	Haleakala	Pan-STARRS 1	·	1.0 km	MPC · JPL
766290	2014 JV_{92}	—	May 4, 2014	Haleakala	Pan-STARRS 1	·	1.4 km	MPC · JPL
766291	2014 JT_{94}	—	May 8, 2014	Haleakala	Pan-STARRS 1	·	1.5 km	MPC · JPL
766292	2014 JL_{95}	—	May 2, 2014	Mount Lemmon	Mount Lemmon Survey	·	630 m	MPC · JPL
766293	2014 JM_{95}	—	May 7, 2014	Haleakala	Pan-STARRS 1	·	920 m	MPC · JPL
766294	2014 JT_{95}	—	May 8, 2014	Haleakala	Pan-STARRS 1	·	870 m	MPC · JPL
766295	2014 JM_{96}	—	May 7, 2014	Haleakala	Pan-STARRS 1	EUN	830 m	MPC · JPL
766296	2014 JD_{99}	—	May 7, 2014	Haleakala	Pan-STARRS 1	·	1.2 km	MPC · JPL
766297	2014 JA_{100}	—	September 9, 2015	Haleakala	Pan-STARRS 1	·	950 m	MPC · JPL
766298	2014 JB_{103}	—	May 5, 2014	Haleakala	Pan-STARRS 1	·	1.4 km	MPC · JPL
766299	2014 JZ_{103}	—	May 1, 2014	ESA OGS	ESA OGS	·	950 m	MPC · JPL
766300	2014 JW_{105}	—	May 6, 2014	Haleakala	Pan-STARRS 1	·	1.1 km	MPC · JPL

== 766301–766400 ==
back to top

Designation			Discovery			Properties		Ref
Permanent	Provisional	Named after	Date	Site	Discoverer(s)	Category	Diam.	Ref
766301	2014 JA_{106}	—	May 7, 2014	Haleakala	Pan-STARRS 1	·	820 m	MPC · JPL
766302	2014 JE_{106}	—	May 7, 2014	Haleakala	Pan-STARRS 1	·	1.4 km	MPC · JPL
766303	2014 JF_{106}	—	May 8, 2014	Haleakala	Pan-STARRS 1	·	930 m	MPC · JPL
766304	2014 JK_{106}	—	May 7, 2014	Haleakala	Pan-STARRS 1	·	1.0 km	MPC · JPL
766305	2014 JB_{108}	—	May 7, 2014	Haleakala	Pan-STARRS 1	·	2.7 km	MPC · JPL
766306	2014 JG_{108}	—	May 8, 2014	Haleakala	Pan-STARRS 1	·	1.4 km	MPC · JPL
766307	2014 JK_{110}	—	May 7, 2014	Haleakala	Pan-STARRS 1	·	2.4 km	MPC · JPL
766308	2014 JY_{110}	—	May 10, 2014	Haleakala	Pan-STARRS 1	HNS	940 m	MPC · JPL
766309	2014 JQ_{113}	—	May 7, 2014	Haleakala	Pan-STARRS 1	·	1.4 km	MPC · JPL
766310	2014 JW_{113}	—	May 7, 2014	Haleakala	Pan-STARRS 1	KON	1.7 km	MPC · JPL
766311	2014 JK_{114}	—	May 2, 2014	Mount Lemmon	Mount Lemmon Survey	·	890 m	MPC · JPL
766312	2014 JX_{114}	—	May 7, 2014	Haleakala	Pan-STARRS 1	·	890 m	MPC · JPL
766313	2014 JY_{114}	—	May 7, 2014	Haleakala	Pan-STARRS 1	·	800 m	MPC · JPL
766314	2014 JN_{115}	—	May 7, 2014	Haleakala	Pan-STARRS 1	·	1.0 km	MPC · JPL
766315	2014 JK_{118}	—	May 8, 2014	Haleakala	Pan-STARRS 1	·	1.2 km	MPC · JPL
766316	2014 JS_{118}	—	May 7, 2014	Haleakala	Pan-STARRS 1	MAR	690 m	MPC · JPL
766317	2014 JT_{118}	—	May 3, 2014	Mount Lemmon	Mount Lemmon Survey	·	1.1 km	MPC · JPL
766318	2014 JP_{123}	—	May 7, 2014	Haleakala	Pan-STARRS 1	·	860 m	MPC · JPL
766319	2014 JV_{130}	—	April 23, 2014	Cerro Tololo	DECam	·	980 m	MPC · JPL
766320	2014 JY_{130}	—	May 2, 2014	Mount Lemmon	Mount Lemmon Survey	·	800 m	MPC · JPL
766321	2014 JK_{134}	—	May 9, 2014	Haleakala	Pan-STARRS 1	·	880 m	MPC · JPL
766322	2014 KX_{3}	—	October 23, 2006	Kitt Peak	Spacewatch	·	1.6 km	MPC · JPL
766323	2014 KX_{9}	—	November 28, 2012	Haleakala	Pan-STARRS 1	T_{j} (2.98) · EUP	2.8 km	MPC · JPL
766324	2014 KQ_{11}	—	May 21, 2014	Haleakala	Pan-STARRS 1	·	890 m	MPC · JPL
766325	2014 KE_{12}	—	November 17, 2011	Mount Lemmon	Mount Lemmon Survey	·	1.5 km	MPC · JPL
766326	2014 KL_{19}	—	April 29, 2014	ESA OGS	ESA OGS	·	440 m	MPC · JPL
766327	2014 KV_{23}	—	October 26, 2011	Haleakala	Pan-STARRS 1	·	1.4 km	MPC · JPL
766328	2014 KJ_{25}	—	May 7, 2014	Haleakala	Pan-STARRS 1	·	1.4 km	MPC · JPL
766329	2014 KD_{26}	—	May 21, 2014	Mount Lemmon	Mount Lemmon Survey	·	1.1 km	MPC · JPL
766330	2014 KG_{27}	—	May 4, 2014	Haleakala	Pan-STARRS 1	·	1.5 km	MPC · JPL
766331	2014 KU_{27}	—	March 22, 2014	Kitt Peak	Spacewatch	·	1.4 km	MPC · JPL
766332	2014 KT_{29}	—	May 22, 2014	Haleakala	Pan-STARRS 1	·	1.3 km	MPC · JPL
766333	2014 KF_{33}	—	May 1, 2014	Mount Lemmon	Mount Lemmon Survey	·	960 m	MPC · JPL
766334	2014 KG_{37}	—	April 21, 2014	Mount Lemmon	Mount Lemmon Survey	·	2.5 km	MPC · JPL
766335	2014 KC_{49}	—	May 21, 2014	Haleakala	Pan-STARRS 1	·	1.3 km	MPC · JPL
766336	2014 KV_{49}	—	May 4, 2014	Haleakala	Pan-STARRS 1	·	1.1 km	MPC · JPL
766337	2014 KF_{50}	—	November 14, 2012	Kitt Peak	Spacewatch	·	680 m	MPC · JPL
766338	2014 KZ_{58}	—	May 6, 2014	Haleakala	Pan-STARRS 1	·	1.0 km	MPC · JPL
766339	2014 KH_{61}	—	May 24, 2014	Haleakala	Pan-STARRS 1	·	1.1 km	MPC · JPL
766340	2014 KQ_{61}	—	May 24, 2014	Haleakala	Pan-STARRS 1	HNS	1.1 km	MPC · JPL
766341	2014 KY_{61}	—	May 24, 2014	Haleakala	Pan-STARRS 1	·	1.3 km	MPC · JPL
766342	2014 KA_{62}	—	May 25, 2014	Haleakala	Pan-STARRS 1	·	1.4 km	MPC · JPL
766343	2014 KA_{64}	—	May 21, 2014	Haleakala	Pan-STARRS 1	BAR	1.0 km	MPC · JPL
766344	2014 KO_{67}	—	February 3, 2013	Haleakala	Pan-STARRS 1	·	1.2 km	MPC · JPL
766345	2014 KR_{69}	—	May 7, 2014	Haleakala	Pan-STARRS 1	·	1.1 km	MPC · JPL
766346	2014 KR_{71}	—	December 12, 2004	Kitt Peak	Spacewatch	·	980 m	MPC · JPL
766347	2014 KU_{72}	—	May 7, 2014	Haleakala	Pan-STARRS 1	·	1.8 km	MPC · JPL
766348	2014 KH_{74}	—	May 26, 2014	Mount Lemmon	Mount Lemmon Survey	EUN	860 m	MPC · JPL
766349	2014 KE_{81}	—	May 20, 2014	Haleakala	Pan-STARRS 1	·	930 m	MPC · JPL
766350	2014 KO_{81}	—	May 27, 2014	Mount Lemmon	Mount Lemmon Survey	·	1.1 km	MPC · JPL
766351	2014 KB_{94}	—	May 28, 2014	Haleakala	Pan-STARRS 1	·	1.1 km	MPC · JPL
766352	2014 KO_{95}	—	May 6, 2014	Haleakala	Pan-STARRS 1	·	1.1 km	MPC · JPL
766353	2014 KG_{99}	—	January 10, 2013	Haleakala	Pan-STARRS 1	·	1.5 km	MPC · JPL
766354	2014 KV_{102}	—	May 21, 2014	Haleakala	Pan-STARRS 1	EUN	820 m	MPC · JPL
766355	2014 KE_{103}	—	May 7, 2014	Haleakala	Pan-STARRS 1	·	1.3 km	MPC · JPL
766356	2014 KT_{103}	—	May 26, 2014	Haleakala	Pan-STARRS 1	ADE	1.3 km	MPC · JPL
766357	2014 KY_{104}	—	September 29, 2011	Mount Lemmon	Mount Lemmon Survey	·	1.2 km	MPC · JPL
766358	2014 KZ_{104}	—	October 8, 2007	Mount Lemmon	Mount Lemmon Survey	·	1.1 km	MPC · JPL
766359	2014 KY_{105}	—	February 3, 2009	Mount Lemmon	Mount Lemmon Survey	·	1.1 km	MPC · JPL
766360	2014 KF_{107}	—	May 21, 2014	Mount Lemmon	Mount Lemmon Survey	EUN	930 m	MPC · JPL
766361	2014 KK_{107}	—	October 25, 2011	Haleakala	Pan-STARRS 1	·	1.4 km	MPC · JPL
766362	2014 KC_{108}	—	May 21, 2014	Haleakala	Pan-STARRS 1	·	1.4 km	MPC · JPL
766363	2014 KA_{109}	—	May 7, 2014	Haleakala	Pan-STARRS 1	·	1 km	MPC · JPL
766364	2014 KE_{109}	—	October 6, 2007	Kitt Peak	Spacewatch	·	760 m	MPC · JPL
766365	2014 KJ_{109}	—	February 3, 2013	Haleakala	Pan-STARRS 1	·	1.2 km	MPC · JPL
766366	2014 KZ_{109}	—	January 18, 2013	Mount Lemmon	Mount Lemmon Survey	·	1.1 km	MPC · JPL
766367	2014 KB_{110}	—	May 23, 2014	Haleakala	Pan-STARRS 1	·	1.4 km	MPC · JPL
766368	2014 KQ_{110}	—	May 24, 2014	Haleakala	Pan-STARRS 1	·	680 m	MPC · JPL
766369	2014 KY_{110}	—	May 25, 2014	Haleakala	Pan-STARRS 1	·	1.3 km	MPC · JPL
766370	2014 KC_{111}	—	September 11, 2010	Mount Lemmon	Mount Lemmon Survey	·	1.5 km	MPC · JPL
766371	2014 KQ_{111}	—	February 14, 2013	Kitt Peak	Spacewatch	·	1.4 km	MPC · JPL
766372	2014 KZ_{111}	—	May 2, 2014	Mount Lemmon	Mount Lemmon Survey	EUN	980 m	MPC · JPL
766373	2014 KN_{112}	—	January 17, 2013	Haleakala	Pan-STARRS 1	EUN	1.1 km	MPC · JPL
766374	2014 KE_{115}	—	May 23, 2014	Haleakala	Pan-STARRS 1	HNS	900 m	MPC · JPL
766375	2014 KY_{116}	—	October 24, 2015	Mount Lemmon	Mount Lemmon Survey	EUN	1.0 km	MPC · JPL
766376	2014 KE_{117}	—	May 26, 2014	Haleakala	Pan-STARRS 1	·	1.1 km	MPC · JPL
766377	2014 KW_{117}	—	October 18, 2015	Haleakala	Pan-STARRS 1	·	1.2 km	MPC · JPL
766378	2014 KZ_{117}	—	May 21, 2014	Haleakala	Pan-STARRS 1	·	1.0 km	MPC · JPL
766379	2014 KY_{118}	—	August 12, 2015	Haleakala	Pan-STARRS 1	·	970 m	MPC · JPL
766380	2014 KK_{120}	—	May 8, 2014	Haleakala	Pan-STARRS 1	EUN	760 m	MPC · JPL
766381	2014 KS_{120}	—	May 21, 2014	Haleakala	Pan-STARRS 1	·	1.1 km	MPC · JPL
766382	2014 KW_{122}	—	May 7, 2014	Haleakala	Pan-STARRS 1	·	3.1 km	MPC · JPL
766383	2014 KH_{123}	—	May 30, 2014	Mount Lemmon	Mount Lemmon Survey	·	1.5 km	MPC · JPL
766384	2014 KP_{123}	—	May 27, 2014	Haleakala	Pan-STARRS 1	EUN	930 m	MPC · JPL
766385	2014 KG_{124}	—	May 23, 2014	Haleakala	Pan-STARRS 1	·	1.0 km	MPC · JPL
766386	2014 KN_{124}	—	May 28, 2014	Haleakala	Pan-STARRS 1	·	930 m	MPC · JPL
766387	2014 KW_{124}	—	May 23, 2014	Haleakala	Pan-STARRS 1	BRG	1.0 km	MPC · JPL
766388	2014 KD_{126}	—	May 28, 2014	Haleakala	Pan-STARRS 1	·	1.1 km	MPC · JPL
766389	2014 KU_{126}	—	May 28, 2014	Haleakala	Pan-STARRS 1	·	2.1 km	MPC · JPL
766390	2014 KW_{128}	—	May 26, 2014	Haleakala	Pan-STARRS 1	·	1.3 km	MPC · JPL
766391	2014 KJ_{130}	—	May 25, 2014	Haleakala	Pan-STARRS 1	·	2.1 km	MPC · JPL
766392	2014 KB_{132}	—	May 31, 2014	Haleakala	Pan-STARRS 1	·	1.5 km	MPC · JPL
766393	2014 KL_{132}	—	May 25, 2014	Haleakala	Pan-STARRS 1	·	490 m	MPC · JPL
766394	2014 KV_{132}	—	May 20, 2014	Haleakala	Pan-STARRS 1	·	1.4 km	MPC · JPL
766395	2014 KP_{133}	—	May 26, 2014	Haleakala	Pan-STARRS 1	·	1.2 km	MPC · JPL
766396	2014 KX_{133}	—	May 7, 2014	Haleakala	Pan-STARRS 1	·	1.1 km	MPC · JPL
766397	2014 KR_{134}	—	May 21, 2014	Haleakala	Pan-STARRS 1	HNS	790 m	MPC · JPL
766398	2014 KX_{137}	—	May 26, 2014	Haleakala	Pan-STARRS 1	·	1.6 km	MPC · JPL
766399	2014 KD_{143}	—	April 27, 2006	Cerro Tololo	Deep Ecliptic Survey	·	840 m	MPC · JPL
766400	2014 KM_{143}	—	May 30, 2014	Haleakala	Pan-STARRS 1	·	1.2 km	MPC · JPL

== 766401–766500 ==
back to top

Designation			Discovery			Properties		Ref
Permanent	Provisional	Named after	Date	Site	Discoverer(s)	Category	Diam.	Ref
766401	2014 KB_{146}	—	May 21, 2014	Haleakala	Pan-STARRS 1	·	980 m	MPC · JPL
766402	2014 KE_{146}	—	May 23, 2014	Haleakala	Pan-STARRS 1	·	1.4 km	MPC · JPL
766403	2014 KH_{162}	—	May 21, 2014	Haleakala	Pan-STARRS 1	·	1.2 km	MPC · JPL
766404	2014 LB_{4}	—	May 4, 2014	Mount Lemmon	Mount Lemmon Survey	·	1.1 km	MPC · JPL
766405	2014 LX_{4}	—	May 10, 2014	Haleakala	Pan-STARRS 1	·	1.4 km	MPC · JPL
766406	2014 LH_{10}	—	February 10, 2014	Haleakala	Pan-STARRS 1	·	1.6 km	MPC · JPL
766407	2014 LY_{10}	—	May 7, 2014	Haleakala	Pan-STARRS 1	·	1.3 km	MPC · JPL
766408	2014 LU_{18}	—	May 7, 2014	Haleakala	Pan-STARRS 1	PHO	730 m	MPC · JPL
766409	2014 LX_{24}	—	December 30, 2007	Kitt Peak	Spacewatch	EUP	2.9 km	MPC · JPL
766410	2014 LY_{28}	—	June 3, 2014	Haleakala	Pan-STARRS 1	H	340 m	MPC · JPL
766411	2014 LY_{29}	—	June 4, 2014	Haleakala	Pan-STARRS 1	·	2.3 km	MPC · JPL
766412	2014 LH_{32}	—	June 5, 2014	Haleakala	Pan-STARRS 1	·	930 m	MPC · JPL
766413	2014 LV_{33}	—	June 2, 2014	Mount Lemmon	Mount Lemmon Survey	·	890 m	MPC · JPL
766414	2014 LW_{34}	—	June 7, 2014	Haleakala	Pan-STARRS 1	·	1.6 km	MPC · JPL
766415	2014 LD_{35}	—	June 5, 2014	Haleakala	Pan-STARRS 1	·	1.1 km	MPC · JPL
766416	2014 MY_{1}	—	May 26, 2014	Haleakala	Pan-STARRS 1	EUN	760 m	MPC · JPL
766417	2014 MR_{6}	—	June 8, 2014	Haleakala	Pan-STARRS 1	·	1.4 km	MPC · JPL
766418	2014 MM_{16}	—	May 6, 2014	Haleakala	Pan-STARRS 1	·	1.3 km	MPC · JPL
766419	2014 ME_{22}	—	February 3, 2013	Haleakala	Pan-STARRS 1	·	950 m	MPC · JPL
766420	2014 MJ_{22}	—	October 24, 2011	Kitt Peak	Spacewatch	·	470 m	MPC · JPL
766421	2014 MU_{23}	—	June 25, 2014	Mount Lemmon	Mount Lemmon Survey	MAR	700 m	MPC · JPL
766422	2014 MZ_{29}	—	June 4, 2014	Haleakala	Pan-STARRS 1	HNS	1.0 km	MPC · JPL
766423	2014 MY_{32}	—	May 25, 2014	Haleakala	Pan-STARRS 1	BAR	1.5 km	MPC · JPL
766424	2014 MK_{35}	—	December 23, 2012	Haleakala	Pan-STARRS 1	·	860 m	MPC · JPL
766425	2014 MC_{40}	—	April 24, 2009	Kitt Peak	Spacewatch	·	1.6 km	MPC · JPL
766426	2014 MQ_{40}	—	May 27, 2014	Haleakala	Pan-STARRS 1	·	1.2 km	MPC · JPL
766427	2014 MF_{42}	—	June 28, 2014	Haleakala	Pan-STARRS 1	·	420 m	MPC · JPL
766428	2014 MZ_{42}	—	June 2, 2014	Haleakala	Pan-STARRS 1	·	570 m	MPC · JPL
766429	2014 MK_{44}	—	March 17, 2005	Mount Lemmon	Mount Lemmon Survey	·	1.0 km	MPC · JPL
766430	2014 ML_{45}	—	June 27, 2014	Haleakala	Pan-STARRS 1	HNS	870 m	MPC · JPL
766431	2014 MV_{47}	—	May 7, 2014	Haleakala	Pan-STARRS 1	·	1.2 km	MPC · JPL
766432	2014 MX_{48}	—	November 8, 2010	Mount Lemmon	Mount Lemmon Survey	·	1.5 km	MPC · JPL
766433	2014 MT_{51}	—	November 27, 2010	Mount Lemmon	Mount Lemmon Survey	·	1.6 km	MPC · JPL
766434	2014 MY_{53}	—	October 12, 1998	Kitt Peak	Spacewatch	·	410 m	MPC · JPL
766435	2014 MM_{65}	—	June 29, 2014	Mount Lemmon	Mount Lemmon Survey	·	1.5 km	MPC · JPL
766436	2014 MV_{72}	—	August 29, 2009	Kitt Peak	Spacewatch	·	1.5 km	MPC · JPL
766437	2014 MA_{73}	—	October 16, 2009	Mount Lemmon	Mount Lemmon Survey	·	2.1 km	MPC · JPL
766438	2014 MX_{73}	—	June 20, 2014	Haleakala	Pan-STARRS 1	·	1.1 km	MPC · JPL
766439	2014 MJ_{74}	—	June 21, 2014	Haleakala	Pan-STARRS 1	MAR	840 m	MPC · JPL
766440	2014 MQ_{75}	—	June 27, 2014	Haleakala	Pan-STARRS 1	·	1.3 km	MPC · JPL
766441	2014 ML_{79}	—	June 28, 2014	Haleakala	Pan-STARRS 1	·	930 m	MPC · JPL
766442	2014 MN_{79}	—	June 27, 2014	Haleakala	Pan-STARRS 1	·	560 m	MPC · JPL
766443	2014 MV_{79}	—	June 24, 2014	Mount Lemmon	Mount Lemmon Survey	·	1.6 km	MPC · JPL
766444	2014 MX_{80}	—	June 24, 2014	Haleakala	Pan-STARRS 1	HNS	830 m	MPC · JPL
766445	2014 MN_{82}	—	June 30, 2014	Haleakala	Pan-STARRS 1	BRA	1.0 km	MPC · JPL
766446	2014 MQ_{82}	—	June 27, 2014	Haleakala	Pan-STARRS 1	·	1.9 km	MPC · JPL
766447	2014 MX_{82}	—	June 29, 2014	Haleakala	Pan-STARRS 1	·	2.0 km	MPC · JPL
766448	2014 MA_{83}	—	June 24, 2014	Haleakala	Pan-STARRS 1	·	1.3 km	MPC · JPL
766449	2014 MO_{83}	—	May 16, 2018	Mount Lemmon	Mount Lemmon Survey	·	1.2 km	MPC · JPL
766450	2014 MW_{86}	—	April 16, 2013	Cerro Tololo-DECam	DECam	·	1.5 km	MPC · JPL
766451	2014 MB_{88}	—	June 27, 2014	Haleakala	Pan-STARRS 1	·	990 m	MPC · JPL
766452	2014 MJ_{88}	—	June 27, 2014	Haleakala	Pan-STARRS 1	·	1.2 km	MPC · JPL
766453	2014 MG_{90}	—	June 27, 2014	Haleakala	Pan-STARRS 1	·	1.4 km	MPC · JPL
766454	2014 MH_{90}	—	June 24, 2014	Haleakala	Pan-STARRS 1	·	1.5 km	MPC · JPL
766455	2014 MJ_{90}	—	June 27, 2014	Haleakala	Pan-STARRS 1	·	1.5 km	MPC · JPL
766456	2014 MD_{91}	—	June 27, 2014	Haleakala	Pan-STARRS 1	·	2.1 km	MPC · JPL
766457	2014 MZ_{92}	—	June 26, 2014	Haleakala	Pan-STARRS 1	·	1.1 km	MPC · JPL
766458	2014 MK_{95}	—	June 27, 2014	Haleakala	Pan-STARRS 1	·	940 m	MPC · JPL
766459	2014 MV_{99}	—	June 27, 2014	Haleakala	Pan-STARRS 1	·	1.4 km	MPC · JPL
766460	2014 MM_{100}	—	June 29, 2014	Haleakala	Pan-STARRS 1	·	1.3 km	MPC · JPL
766461	2014 MZ_{100}	—	September 19, 2009	Kitt Peak	Spacewatch	·	2.3 km	MPC · JPL
766462	2014 MH_{101}	—	June 24, 2014	Haleakala	Pan-STARRS 1	·	1.4 km	MPC · JPL
766463	2014 MQ_{101}	—	June 30, 2014	Haleakala	Pan-STARRS 1	EUN	900 m	MPC · JPL
766464	2014 NH_{2}	—	July 2, 2014	Mount Lemmon	Mount Lemmon Survey	·	1.4 km	MPC · JPL
766465	2014 NL_{8}	—	July 1, 2014	Haleakala	Pan-STARRS 1	·	1.2 km	MPC · JPL
766466	2014 NK_{9}	—	January 26, 2012	Mount Lemmon	Mount Lemmon Survey	AGN	890 m	MPC · JPL
766467	2014 NA_{16}	—	April 21, 2009	Mount Lemmon	Mount Lemmon Survey	·	1.2 km	MPC · JPL
766468	2014 NC_{17}	—	June 2, 2014	Haleakala	Pan-STARRS 1	MAR	810 m	MPC · JPL
766469	2014 ND_{17}	—	July 15, 2010	WISE	WISE	·	1.5 km	MPC · JPL
766470	2014 NQ_{17}	—	October 29, 2010	Mount Lemmon	Mount Lemmon Survey	URS	2.7 km	MPC · JPL
766471	2014 NV_{18}	—	March 5, 2013	Haleakala	Pan-STARRS 1	ADE	1.4 km	MPC · JPL
766472	2014 NB_{22}	—	June 26, 2014	Haleakala	Pan-STARRS 1	·	1.4 km	MPC · JPL
766473	2014 NX_{23}	—	October 29, 2011	Haleakala	Pan-STARRS 1	·	1.4 km	MPC · JPL
766474	2014 NF_{25}	—	June 2, 2014	Haleakala	Pan-STARRS 1	GEF	930 m	MPC · JPL
766475	2014 NX_{25}	—	July 2, 2014	Haleakala	Pan-STARRS 1	·	1 km	MPC · JPL
766476	2014 NC_{29}	—	July 2, 2014	Haleakala	Pan-STARRS 1	·	1.4 km	MPC · JPL
766477	2014 NX_{29}	—	July 2, 2014	Haleakala	Pan-STARRS 1	MAR	900 m	MPC · JPL
766478	2014 NV_{34}	—	July 2, 2014	Haleakala	Pan-STARRS 1	EUN	940 m	MPC · JPL
766479	2014 NR_{39}	—	July 2, 2014	Mount Lemmon	Mount Lemmon Survey	·	1.1 km	MPC · JPL
766480	2014 NN_{40}	—	July 3, 2014	Haleakala	Pan-STARRS 1	HNS	940 m	MPC · JPL
766481	2014 NO_{43}	—	July 3, 2014	Haleakala	Pan-STARRS 1	·	1.7 km	MPC · JPL
766482	2014 NE_{45}	—	September 26, 2006	Kitt Peak	Spacewatch	·	1.1 km	MPC · JPL
766483	2014 NK_{50}	—	April 7, 2013	Haleakala	Pan-STARRS 1	EUN	880 m	MPC · JPL
766484	2014 NT_{52}	—	July 3, 2014	Haleakala	Pan-STARRS 1	·	1.1 km	MPC · JPL
766485	2014 NM_{53}	—	June 4, 2014	Haleakala	Pan-STARRS 1	·	510 m	MPC · JPL
766486	2014 NZ_{53}	—	November 2, 2010	Mount Lemmon	Mount Lemmon Survey	·	1.5 km	MPC · JPL
766487	2014 NM_{56}	—	July 6, 2014	Haleakala	Pan-STARRS 1	·	1.6 km	MPC · JPL
766488	2014 NH_{59}	—	June 5, 2014	Haleakala	Pan-STARRS 1	(194)	1.4 km	MPC · JPL
766489	2014 NT_{60}	—	June 26, 2014	Haleakala	Pan-STARRS 1	·	1.4 km	MPC · JPL
766490	2014 NQ_{63}	—	January 8, 2002	Socorro	LINEAR	·	2.8 km	MPC · JPL
766491	2014 NR_{63}	—	June 29, 2014	Haleakala	Pan-STARRS 1	·	380 m	MPC · JPL
766492	2014 NU_{63}	—	February 5, 2009	Kitt Peak	Spacewatch	·	1.2 km	MPC · JPL
766493	2014 NO_{67}	—	September 1, 2005	Kitt Peak	Spacewatch	·	1.5 km	MPC · JPL
766494	2014 NE_{68}	—	July 1, 2014	Haleakala	Pan-STARRS 1	HNS	760 m	MPC · JPL
766495	2014 NP_{69}	—	August 10, 2010	Kitt Peak	Spacewatch	·	1.5 km	MPC · JPL
766496	2014 NB_{70}	—	July 2, 2014	Haleakala	Pan-STARRS 1	·	1.4 km	MPC · JPL
766497	2014 NM_{70}	—	April 10, 2013	Haleakala	Pan-STARRS 1	HOF	1.8 km	MPC · JPL
766498	2014 NV_{70}	—	March 5, 2013	Mount Lemmon	Mount Lemmon Survey	·	1.1 km	MPC · JPL
766499	2014 NY_{70}	—	July 7, 2014	Haleakala	Pan-STARRS 1	·	1.2 km	MPC · JPL
766500	2014 NT_{71}	—	November 26, 2010	Mount Lemmon	Mount Lemmon Survey	·	1.3 km	MPC · JPL

== 766501–766600 ==
back to top

Designation			Discovery			Properties		Ref
Permanent	Provisional	Named after	Date	Site	Discoverer(s)	Category	Diam.	Ref
766501	2014 NV_{71}	—	September 30, 2010	Mount Lemmon	Mount Lemmon Survey	·	1.1 km	MPC · JPL
766502	2014 NJ_{72}	—	July 8, 2014	Haleakala	Pan-STARRS 1	·	1.4 km	MPC · JPL
766503	2014 NT_{73}	—	July 2, 2014	Haleakala	Pan-STARRS 1	·	930 m	MPC · JPL
766504	2014 NY_{73}	—	July 1, 2014	Haleakala	Pan-STARRS 1	·	870 m	MPC · JPL
766505	2014 NE_{74}	—	July 1, 2014	Haleakala	Pan-STARRS 1	·	1.3 km	MPC · JPL
766506	2014 NT_{74}	—	July 1, 2014	Haleakala	Pan-STARRS 1	·	1.3 km	MPC · JPL
766507	2014 NJ_{76}	—	December 9, 2015	Mount Lemmon	Mount Lemmon Survey	HNS	880 m	MPC · JPL
766508	2014 NL_{76}	—	November 18, 2015	Haleakala	Pan-STARRS 1	EUN	1.0 km	MPC · JPL
766509	2014 NQ_{76}	—	July 1, 2014	Haleakala	Pan-STARRS 1	·	1.3 km	MPC · JPL
766510	2014 NV_{76}	—	October 19, 2010	Mount Lemmon	Mount Lemmon Survey	·	1.4 km	MPC · JPL
766511	2014 NK_{78}	—	February 3, 2017	Haleakala	Pan-STARRS 1	·	1.8 km	MPC · JPL
766512	2014 NW_{78}	—	January 3, 2017	Haleakala	Pan-STARRS 1	MAR	710 m	MPC · JPL
766513	2014 NE_{80}	—	July 4, 2014	Haleakala	Pan-STARRS 1	·	1.3 km	MPC · JPL
766514	2014 NB_{93}	—	July 8, 2014	Haleakala	Pan-STARRS 1	HOF	2.0 km	MPC · JPL
766515	2014 NA_{96}	—	July 1, 2014	Haleakala	Pan-STARRS 1	·	1.3 km	MPC · JPL
766516	2014 OU_{1}	—	October 5, 2011	Piszkéstető	K. Sárneczky	·	510 m	MPC · JPL
766517	2014 OM_{9}	—	July 25, 2014	Haleakala	Pan-STARRS 1	(13314)	1.4 km	MPC · JPL
766518	2014 OM_{10}	—	December 27, 2011	Mount Lemmon	Mount Lemmon Survey	·	1.2 km	MPC · JPL
766519	2014 OC_{11}	—	July 25, 2014	Haleakala	Pan-STARRS 1	·	1.6 km	MPC · JPL
766520	2014 OZ_{14}	—	July 25, 2014	Haleakala	Pan-STARRS 1	·	1.3 km	MPC · JPL
766521	2014 OS_{15}	—	July 25, 2014	Haleakala	Pan-STARRS 1	·	1.3 km	MPC · JPL
766522	2014 OC_{19}	—	September 15, 2006	Kitt Peak	Spacewatch	·	940 m	MPC · JPL
766523	2014 OF_{19}	—	September 23, 2011	Kitt Peak	Spacewatch	·	400 m	MPC · JPL
766524	2014 OS_{19}	—	July 25, 2014	Haleakala	Pan-STARRS 1	GEF	890 m	MPC · JPL
766525	2014 OF_{20}	—	March 19, 2013	Haleakala	Pan-STARRS 1	·	890 m	MPC · JPL
766526	2014 OJ_{20}	—	June 26, 2014	Haleakala	Pan-STARRS 1	·	1.2 km	MPC · JPL
766527	2014 OL_{21}	—	June 2, 2014	Haleakala	Pan-STARRS 1	·	890 m	MPC · JPL
766528	2014 OD_{22}	—	July 4, 2014	Haleakala	Pan-STARRS 1	·	1.0 km	MPC · JPL
766529	2014 ON_{23}	—	March 5, 2013	Mount Lemmon	Mount Lemmon Survey	·	1.2 km	MPC · JPL
766530	2014 OR_{29}	—	July 25, 2014	Haleakala	Pan-STARRS 1	·	970 m	MPC · JPL
766531	2014 OC_{31}	—	July 25, 2014	Haleakala	Pan-STARRS 1	EOS	1.2 km	MPC · JPL
766532	2014 OF_{34}	—	July 25, 2014	Haleakala	Pan-STARRS 1	·	1.2 km	MPC · JPL
766533	2014 OE_{43}	—	July 2, 2014	Haleakala	Pan-STARRS 1	V	470 m	MPC · JPL
766534	2014 OK_{43}	—	March 8, 2008	Mount Lemmon	Mount Lemmon Survey	·	1.4 km	MPC · JPL
766535	2014 OM_{44}	—	June 26, 2014	Mount Lemmon	Mount Lemmon Survey	·	1.3 km	MPC · JPL
766536	2014 OD_{46}	—	July 25, 2014	Haleakala	Pan-STARRS 1	·	1.2 km	MPC · JPL
766537	2014 OL_{48}	—	July 25, 2014	Haleakala	Pan-STARRS 1	·	1.1 km	MPC · JPL
766538	2014 OY_{48}	—	June 21, 2010	Mount Lemmon	Mount Lemmon Survey	EUN	890 m	MPC · JPL
766539	2014 OF_{50}	—	July 25, 2014	Haleakala	Pan-STARRS 1	·	1.4 km	MPC · JPL
766540	2014 OR_{51}	—	July 25, 2014	Haleakala	Pan-STARRS 1	·	1.4 km	MPC · JPL
766541	2014 OT_{52}	—	March 31, 2009	Kitt Peak	Spacewatch	·	1.0 km	MPC · JPL
766542	2014 OW_{61}	—	September 23, 2008	Kitt Peak	Spacewatch	·	490 m	MPC · JPL
766543	2014 OX_{64}	—	July 8, 2014	Haleakala	Pan-STARRS 1	·	1.1 km	MPC · JPL
766544	2014 OZ_{64}	—	September 29, 2010	Mount Lemmon	Mount Lemmon Survey	·	1.2 km	MPC · JPL
766545	2014 OE_{70}	—	July 25, 2014	Haleakala	Pan-STARRS 1	·	2.9 km	MPC · JPL
766546	2014 OL_{70}	—	February 8, 2013	Haleakala	Pan-STARRS 1	·	440 m	MPC · JPL
766547	2014 OO_{71}	—	June 26, 2014	Haleakala	Pan-STARRS 1	EUN	980 m	MPC · JPL
766548	2014 OQ_{71}	—	October 11, 2010	Mount Lemmon	Mount Lemmon Survey	·	1.1 km	MPC · JPL
766549	2014 OF_{73}	—	October 23, 2011	Haleakala	Pan-STARRS 1	·	1.6 km	MPC · JPL
766550	2014 OB_{76}	—	July 1, 2014	Haleakala	Pan-STARRS 1	·	1.3 km	MPC · JPL
766551	2014 OQ_{76}	—	September 24, 2006	Kitt Peak	Spacewatch	·	1.2 km	MPC · JPL
766552	2014 OV_{77}	—	July 26, 2014	Haleakala	Pan-STARRS 1	·	1.0 km	MPC · JPL
766553	2014 OR_{78}	—	September 30, 2010	Mount Lemmon	Mount Lemmon Survey	PAD	1.2 km	MPC · JPL
766554	2014 OH_{79}	—	February 15, 2013	Haleakala	Pan-STARRS 1	·	1.4 km	MPC · JPL
766555	2014 OM_{85}	—	September 11, 2010	Mount Lemmon	Mount Lemmon Survey	WIT	720 m	MPC · JPL
766556	2014 OM_{86}	—	May 7, 2014	Haleakala	Pan-STARRS 1	·	860 m	MPC · JPL
766557	2014 OB_{87}	—	September 2, 2011	Haleakala	Pan-STARRS 1	·	420 m	MPC · JPL
766558	2014 OC_{89}	—	November 3, 2011	Mount Lemmon	Mount Lemmon Survey	·	1.3 km	MPC · JPL
766559	2014 OM_{89}	—	June 18, 2005	Mount Lemmon	Mount Lemmon Survey	AEO	1.0 km	MPC · JPL
766560	2014 OR_{89}	—	July 4, 2014	Haleakala	Pan-STARRS 1	·	1.1 km	MPC · JPL
766561	2014 OE_{90}	—	July 4, 2014	Haleakala	Pan-STARRS 1	·	1.2 km	MPC · JPL
766562	2014 OM_{91}	—	September 8, 2011	Kitt Peak	Spacewatch	·	460 m	MPC · JPL
766563	2014 OX_{99}	—	July 26, 2014	Haleakala	Pan-STARRS 1	·	2.6 km	MPC · JPL
766564	2014 OF_{100}	—	January 20, 2012	Kitt Peak	Spacewatch	·	2.5 km	MPC · JPL
766565	2014 OG_{108}	—	September 29, 2005	Mount Lemmon	Mount Lemmon Survey	·	1.2 km	MPC · JPL
766566	2014 OK_{114}	—	June 2, 2014	Haleakala	Pan-STARRS 1	BRA	1.1 km	MPC · JPL
766567	2014 OK_{116}	—	July 25, 2014	Haleakala	Pan-STARRS 1	·	1.3 km	MPC · JPL
766568	2014 OR_{118}	—	February 7, 2008	Kitt Peak	Spacewatch	·	1.2 km	MPC · JPL
766569	2014 OS_{119}	—	October 9, 2010	Kitt Peak	Spacewatch	·	1.2 km	MPC · JPL
766570	2014 OE_{120}	—	July 25, 2014	Haleakala	Pan-STARRS 1	·	1.1 km	MPC · JPL
766571	2014 OQ_{122}	—	September 1, 2005	Kitt Peak	Spacewatch	·	1.3 km	MPC · JPL
766572	2014 OB_{125}	—	September 19, 2001	Apache Point	SDSS	GEF	920 m	MPC · JPL
766573	2014 OS_{128}	—	July 25, 2014	Haleakala	Pan-STARRS 1	·	1.5 km	MPC · JPL
766574	2014 OZ_{129}	—	April 6, 2013	Mount Lemmon	Mount Lemmon Survey	PAD	1.2 km	MPC · JPL
766575	2014 OV_{130}	—	April 2, 2005	Mount Lemmon	Mount Lemmon Survey	EUN	870 m	MPC · JPL
766576	2014 OV_{132}	—	July 27, 2014	Haleakala	Pan-STARRS 1	NEM	1.7 km	MPC · JPL
766577	2014 OG_{135}	—	July 27, 2014	Haleakala	Pan-STARRS 1	·	1.6 km	MPC · JPL
766578	2014 OB_{136}	—	March 1, 2008	Mount Lemmon	Mount Lemmon Survey	AGN	940 m	MPC · JPL
766579	2014 OU_{136}	—	June 27, 2014	Haleakala	Pan-STARRS 1	·	520 m	MPC · JPL
766580	2014 OO_{137}	—	March 19, 2009	Kitt Peak	Spacewatch	·	1.2 km	MPC · JPL
766581	2014 OC_{139}	—	October 2, 2010	Kitt Peak	Spacewatch	AGN	780 m	MPC · JPL
766582	2014 OH_{140}	—	October 11, 2005	Kitt Peak	Spacewatch	·	580 m	MPC · JPL
766583	2014 OD_{145}	—	July 4, 2005	Mount Lemmon	Mount Lemmon Survey	·	1.4 km	MPC · JPL
766584	2014 ON_{146}	—	October 10, 2007	Kitt Peak	Spacewatch	MAS	480 m	MPC · JPL
766585	2014 OX_{146}	—	June 27, 2014	Haleakala	Pan-STARRS 1	·	1.2 km	MPC · JPL
766586	2014 OL_{147}	—	October 16, 1999	Kitt Peak	Spacewatch	MAS	540 m	MPC · JPL
766587	2014 OE_{148}	—	September 21, 2011	Kitt Peak	Spacewatch	·	420 m	MPC · JPL
766588	2014 OW_{149}	—	March 3, 2013	Kitt Peak	Spacewatch	·	1.5 km	MPC · JPL
766589	2014 OD_{152}	—	November 18, 2011	Mount Lemmon	Mount Lemmon Survey	EUN	1 km	MPC · JPL
766590	2014 OM_{154}	—	May 7, 2014	Haleakala	Pan-STARRS 1	·	1.4 km	MPC · JPL
766591	2014 OE_{157}	—	June 30, 2014	Haleakala	Pan-STARRS 1	·	1.7 km	MPC · JPL
766592	2014 OL_{163}	—	July 27, 2014	Haleakala	Pan-STARRS 1	·	1.5 km	MPC · JPL
766593	2014 OZ_{165}	—	January 30, 2012	Mount Lemmon	Mount Lemmon Survey	·	1.4 km	MPC · JPL
766594	2014 OF_{167}	—	April 2, 2009	Mount Lemmon	Mount Lemmon Survey	·	1.4 km	MPC · JPL
766595	2014 OM_{168}	—	June 29, 2014	Haleakala	Pan-STARRS 1	·	1.4 km	MPC · JPL
766596	2014 OV_{168}	—	September 15, 2010	Mount Lemmon	Mount Lemmon Survey	·	1.3 km	MPC · JPL
766597	2014 OZ_{168}	—	April 13, 2013	Palomar	Palomar Transient Factory	(194)	1.2 km	MPC · JPL
766598	2014 OZ_{171}	—	July 27, 2014	Haleakala	Pan-STARRS 1	AGN	940 m	MPC · JPL
766599	2014 OW_{172}	—	September 11, 2010	Mount Lemmon	Mount Lemmon Survey	·	1.1 km	MPC · JPL
766600	2014 OZ_{175}	—	October 11, 2001	Kitt Peak	Spacewatch	·	1.4 km	MPC · JPL

== 766601–766700 ==
back to top

Designation			Discovery			Properties		Ref
Permanent	Provisional	Named after	Date	Site	Discoverer(s)	Category	Diam.	Ref
766601	2014 OH_{176}	—	July 27, 2014	Haleakala	Pan-STARRS 1	·	1.5 km	MPC · JPL
766602	2014 OK_{183}	—	June 28, 2014	Haleakala	Pan-STARRS 1	·	940 m	MPC · JPL
766603	2014 OB_{184}	—	July 6, 2014	Haleakala	Pan-STARRS 1	·	1.2 km	MPC · JPL
766604	2014 ON_{187}	—	July 27, 2014	Haleakala	Pan-STARRS 1	·	2.1 km	MPC · JPL
766605	2014 OJ_{199}	—	November 3, 2007	Kitt Peak	Spacewatch	T_{j} (2.95)	4.1 km	MPC · JPL
766606	2014 OZ_{201}	—	July 28, 2014	Haleakala	Pan-STARRS 1	·	1.5 km	MPC · JPL
766607	2014 OD_{203}	—	March 18, 2013	Kitt Peak	Spacewatch	·	1.3 km	MPC · JPL
766608	2014 OZ_{203}	—	January 4, 2011	Mount Lemmon	Mount Lemmon Survey	·	2.0 km	MPC · JPL
766609	2014 OR_{205}	—	July 28, 2014	Haleakala	Pan-STARRS 1	MRX	810 m	MPC · JPL
766610	2014 OO_{214}	—	January 2, 2009	Mount Lemmon	Mount Lemmon Survey	·	570 m	MPC · JPL
766611	2014 OH_{215}	—	July 27, 2014	Haleakala	Pan-STARRS 1	·	1.2 km	MPC · JPL
766612	2014 OG_{216}	—	June 30, 2014	Haleakala	Pan-STARRS 1	HOF	1.8 km	MPC · JPL
766613	2014 OH_{216}	—	July 27, 2014	Haleakala	Pan-STARRS 1	·	1.3 km	MPC · JPL
766614	2014 OP_{218}	—	July 27, 2014	Haleakala	Pan-STARRS 1	·	1.3 km	MPC · JPL
766615	2014 OD_{225}	—	July 27, 2014	Haleakala	Pan-STARRS 1	·	1.8 km	MPC · JPL
766616	2014 OT_{227}	—	March 28, 2009	Kitt Peak	Spacewatch	·	1 km	MPC · JPL
766617	2014 OB_{234}	—	March 6, 2013	Haleakala	Pan-STARRS 1	·	1.3 km	MPC · JPL
766618	2014 OG_{234}	—	October 2, 2010	Kitt Peak	Spacewatch	·	1.2 km	MPC · JPL
766619	2014 OV_{235}	—	May 9, 2014	Kitt Peak	Spacewatch	·	1.4 km	MPC · JPL
766620	2014 OM_{236}	—	May 10, 2014	Haleakala	Pan-STARRS 1	·	1.3 km	MPC · JPL
766621	2014 OU_{236}	—	May 31, 2014	Mount Lemmon	Mount Lemmon Survey	·	1.3 km	MPC · JPL
766622	2014 OX_{237}	—	March 2, 2009	Kitt Peak	Spacewatch	·	1.0 km	MPC · JPL
766623	2014 OE_{240}	—	July 29, 2014	Haleakala	Pan-STARRS 1	·	1.2 km	MPC · JPL
766624	2014 OH_{240}	—	July 29, 2014	Haleakala	Pan-STARRS 1	·	1.2 km	MPC · JPL
766625	2014 OQ_{247}	—	June 30, 2014	Haleakala	Pan-STARRS 1	EUN	950 m	MPC · JPL
766626	2014 OR_{248}	—	June 26, 2014	Haleakala	Pan-STARRS 1	·	1.4 km	MPC · JPL
766627	2014 OG_{249}	—	July 27, 2014	Haleakala	Pan-STARRS 1	·	1.5 km	MPC · JPL
766628	2014 OT_{249}	—	July 29, 2014	Haleakala	Pan-STARRS 1	·	1.3 km	MPC · JPL
766629	2014 OX_{251}	—	June 27, 2014	Haleakala	Pan-STARRS 1	·	1.5 km	MPC · JPL
766630	2014 OR_{254}	—	June 4, 2014	Haleakala	Pan-STARRS 1	·	1.0 km	MPC · JPL
766631	2014 OH_{255}	—	September 26, 2006	Kitt Peak	Spacewatch	·	960 m	MPC · JPL
766632	2014 OD_{261}	—	July 29, 2014	Haleakala	Pan-STARRS 1	·	1.2 km	MPC · JPL
766633	2014 OA_{264}	—	July 29, 2014	Haleakala	Pan-STARRS 1	·	1.4 km	MPC · JPL
766634	2014 OH_{264}	—	October 8, 2010	Kitt Peak	Spacewatch	·	1.3 km	MPC · JPL
766635	2014 OG_{270}	—	December 29, 2011	Mount Lemmon	Mount Lemmon Survey	·	1.0 km	MPC · JPL
766636	2014 ON_{270}	—	April 12, 2013	Haleakala	Pan-STARRS 1	·	2.1 km	MPC · JPL
766637	2014 OV_{272}	—	July 29, 2014	Haleakala	Pan-STARRS 1	·	2.1 km	MPC · JPL
766638	2014 OU_{273}	—	June 29, 2014	Haleakala	Pan-STARRS 1	·	1.5 km	MPC · JPL
766639	2014 OX_{277}	—	March 28, 2008	Mount Lemmon	Mount Lemmon Survey	HOF	2.1 km	MPC · JPL
766640	2014 OF_{278}	—	December 25, 2011	Mount Lemmon	Mount Lemmon Survey	·	870 m	MPC · JPL
766641	2014 OA_{279}	—	February 17, 2007	Kitt Peak	Spacewatch	·	1.6 km	MPC · JPL
766642	2014 OP_{281}	—	July 29, 2014	Haleakala	Pan-STARRS 1	EOS	1.4 km	MPC · JPL
766643	2014 OA_{282}	—	September 11, 2010	Kitt Peak	Spacewatch	·	1.4 km	MPC · JPL
766644	2014 OF_{287}	—	June 28, 2014	Haleakala	Pan-STARRS 1	·	1.2 km	MPC · JPL
766645	2014 OH_{287}	—	June 28, 2014	Haleakala	Pan-STARRS 1	·	1.6 km	MPC · JPL
766646	2014 OJ_{287}	—	July 29, 2014	Haleakala	Pan-STARRS 1	HNS	910 m	MPC · JPL
766647	2014 OD_{291}	—	July 29, 2014	Haleakala	Pan-STARRS 1	·	1.6 km	MPC · JPL
766648	2014 OQ_{291}	—	July 8, 2014	Haleakala	Pan-STARRS 1	·	960 m	MPC · JPL
766649	2014 OJ_{292}	—	January 1, 2009	Kitt Peak	Spacewatch	T_{j} (2.96) · 3:2	4.2 km	MPC · JPL
766650	2014 OQ_{297}	—	September 28, 2000	Kitt Peak	Spacewatch	·	1.6 km	MPC · JPL
766651	2014 OX_{300}	—	July 25, 2014	Haleakala	Pan-STARRS 1	·	1.3 km	MPC · JPL
766652	2014 OM_{301}	—	January 26, 2012	Mount Lemmon	Mount Lemmon Survey	PAD	1.1 km	MPC · JPL
766653	2014 OF_{305}	—	March 13, 2013	Kitt Peak	Spacewatch	·	1.4 km	MPC · JPL
766654	2014 OB_{306}	—	March 15, 2013	Kitt Peak	Spacewatch	AGN	910 m	MPC · JPL
766655	2014 OU_{306}	—	July 25, 2014	Haleakala	Pan-STARRS 1	·	1.3 km	MPC · JPL
766656	2014 OU_{307}	—	July 27, 2014	Haleakala	Pan-STARRS 1	·	1.1 km	MPC · JPL
766657	2014 OG_{311}	—	January 6, 2008	Mauna Kea	P. A. Wiegert	·	1.2 km	MPC · JPL
766658	2014 OU_{311}	—	April 22, 2009	Mount Lemmon	Mount Lemmon Survey	·	1.3 km	MPC · JPL
766659	2014 OL_{312}	—	September 4, 2010	Kitt Peak	Spacewatch	·	1.6 km	MPC · JPL
766660	2014 OP_{312}	—	June 27, 2014	Haleakala	Pan-STARRS 1	·	1.1 km	MPC · JPL
766661	2014 ON_{316}	—	July 25, 2014	Haleakala	Pan-STARRS 1	·	1.4 km	MPC · JPL
766662	2014 OQ_{317}	—	July 7, 2014	Haleakala	Pan-STARRS 1	·	1.4 km	MPC · JPL
766663	2014 OT_{317}	—	July 28, 2014	Haleakala	Pan-STARRS 1	·	1.3 km	MPC · JPL
766664	2014 OC_{320}	—	June 25, 2014	Mount Lemmon	Mount Lemmon Survey	·	1.2 km	MPC · JPL
766665	2014 OO_{321}	—	February 2, 2008	Kitt Peak	Spacewatch	·	1.3 km	MPC · JPL
766666	2014 OT_{322}	—	July 4, 2014	Haleakala	Pan-STARRS 1	·	1.3 km	MPC · JPL
766667	2014 OA_{323}	—	July 29, 2014	Haleakala	Pan-STARRS 1	·	1.7 km	MPC · JPL
766668	2014 OV_{323}	—	February 16, 2013	Mount Lemmon	Mount Lemmon Survey	·	800 m	MPC · JPL
766669	2014 OK_{324}	—	July 25, 2014	Haleakala	Pan-STARRS 1	·	1.1 km	MPC · JPL
766670	2014 OQ_{325}	—	July 29, 2014	Haleakala	Pan-STARRS 1	MAS	570 m	MPC · JPL
766671	2014 OA_{326}	—	July 29, 2014	Haleakala	Pan-STARRS 1	·	1.1 km	MPC · JPL
766672	2014 OC_{328}	—	July 29, 2014	Haleakala	Pan-STARRS 1	·	1.1 km	MPC · JPL
766673	2014 OY_{333}	—	February 15, 2012	Haleakala	Pan-STARRS 1	·	1.7 km	MPC · JPL
766674	2014 OY_{336}	—	July 30, 2014	Haleakala	Pan-STARRS 1	HNS	760 m	MPC · JPL
766675	2014 OU_{347}	—	September 18, 2010	Mount Lemmon	Mount Lemmon Survey	·	1.2 km	MPC · JPL
766676	2014 OC_{349}	—	July 28, 2014	Haleakala	Pan-STARRS 1	·	1.4 km	MPC · JPL
766677	2014 OV_{349}	—	October 8, 2010	Kitt Peak	Spacewatch	·	1.3 km	MPC · JPL
766678	2014 OD_{351}	—	July 28, 2014	Haleakala	Pan-STARRS 1	·	1.0 km	MPC · JPL
766679	2014 OM_{351}	—	September 19, 2010	Kitt Peak	Spacewatch	·	1.8 km	MPC · JPL
766680	2014 OM_{352}	—	July 28, 2014	Haleakala	Pan-STARRS 1	·	980 m	MPC · JPL
766681	2014 OS_{352}	—	September 26, 2005	Kitt Peak	Spacewatch	·	730 m	MPC · JPL
766682	2014 OQ_{353}	—	June 29, 2014	Haleakala	Pan-STARRS 1	·	1.2 km	MPC · JPL
766683	2014 OU_{354}	—	June 24, 2014	Mount Lemmon	Mount Lemmon Survey	·	1.2 km	MPC · JPL
766684	2014 OF_{355}	—	July 28, 2014	Haleakala	Pan-STARRS 1	·	1.4 km	MPC · JPL
766685	2014 OM_{355}	—	July 25, 2014	Haleakala	Pan-STARRS 1	·	1.6 km	MPC · JPL
766686	2014 OS_{357}	—	July 28, 2014	Haleakala	Pan-STARRS 1	HNS	810 m	MPC · JPL
766687	2014 OJ_{360}	—	May 16, 2009	Mount Lemmon	Mount Lemmon Survey	EUN	860 m	MPC · JPL
766688	2014 OM_{361}	—	March 5, 2008	Mount Lemmon	Mount Lemmon Survey	·	1.5 km	MPC · JPL
766689	2014 OO_{361}	—	January 21, 2012	Kitt Peak	Spacewatch	·	1.6 km	MPC · JPL
766690	2014 OE_{362}	—	July 29, 2014	Haleakala	Pan-STARRS 1	KOR	970 m	MPC · JPL
766691	2014 OF_{363}	—	July 27, 2014	Haleakala	Pan-STARRS 1	·	1.2 km	MPC · JPL
766692	2014 OX_{366}	—	July 30, 2014	Haleakala	Pan-STARRS 1	·	1.3 km	MPC · JPL
766693	2014 OO_{368}	—	January 2, 2012	Kitt Peak	Spacewatch	·	1.3 km	MPC · JPL
766694	2014 OB_{370}	—	September 17, 2010	Mount Lemmon	Mount Lemmon Survey	·	1.2 km	MPC · JPL
766695	2014 OV_{371}	—	September 21, 2008	Kitt Peak	Spacewatch	·	420 m	MPC · JPL
766696	2014 OY_{376}	—	July 25, 2014	Haleakala	Pan-STARRS 1	·	1.4 km	MPC · JPL
766697	2014 OO_{377}	—	July 25, 2014	Haleakala	Pan-STARRS 1	DOR	1.8 km	MPC · JPL
766698	2014 OH_{380}	—	October 26, 2011	Haleakala	Pan-STARRS 1	·	940 m	MPC · JPL
766699	2014 OK_{382}	—	July 2, 2014	Haleakala	Pan-STARRS 1	·	1.1 km	MPC · JPL
766700	2014 OO_{383}	—	May 25, 2014	Haleakala	Pan-STARRS 1	·	1.8 km	MPC · JPL

== 766701–766800 ==
back to top

Designation			Discovery			Properties		Ref
Permanent	Provisional	Named after	Date	Site	Discoverer(s)	Category	Diam.	Ref
766701	2014 OW_{386}	—	February 16, 2012	Haleakala	Pan-STARRS 1	·	1.8 km	MPC · JPL
766702	2014 OX_{388}	—	July 7, 2014	Haleakala	Pan-STARRS 1	·	1.1 km	MPC · JPL
766703	2014 OL_{389}	—	June 26, 2014	Mount Lemmon	Mount Lemmon Survey	·	470 m	MPC · JPL
766704	2014 OK_{390}	—	December 14, 2010	Mount Lemmon	Mount Lemmon Survey	·	1.7 km	MPC · JPL
766705	2014 OO_{390}	—	July 30, 2014	Haleakala	Pan-STARRS 1	·	1.6 km	MPC · JPL
766706	2014 OT_{393}	—	July 29, 2014	Haleakala	Pan-STARRS 1	·	1.6 km	MPC · JPL
766707	2014 OH_{395}	—	October 4, 2007	Kitt Peak	Spacewatch	3:2 · SHU	3.7 km	MPC · JPL
766708	2014 OZ_{395}	—	July 25, 2014	Haleakala	Pan-STARRS 1	·	1.3 km	MPC · JPL
766709	2014 ON_{397}	—	July 28, 2014	Haleakala	Pan-STARRS 1	(22805)	2.7 km	MPC · JPL
766710	2014 OD_{399}	—	July 25, 2014	Haleakala	Pan-STARRS 1	KOR	940 m	MPC · JPL
766711	2014 OF_{399}	—	April 3, 2008	Mount Lemmon	Mount Lemmon Survey	AGN	960 m	MPC · JPL
766712	2014 ON_{399}	—	November 2, 2010	Mount Lemmon	Mount Lemmon Survey	HOF	1.9 km	MPC · JPL
766713	2014 OD_{400}	—	October 11, 2010	Mount Lemmon	Mount Lemmon Survey	·	1.1 km	MPC · JPL
766714	2014 OF_{400}	—	March 11, 2007	Mount Lemmon	Mount Lemmon Survey	·	2.0 km	MPC · JPL
766715	2014 OH_{400}	—	February 21, 2007	Mount Lemmon	Mount Lemmon Survey	·	2.2 km	MPC · JPL
766716	2014 OR_{401}	—	January 19, 2012	Kitt Peak	Spacewatch	·	1.3 km	MPC · JPL
766717	2014 OY_{401}	—	January 26, 2012	Haleakala	Pan-STARRS 1	·	1.1 km	MPC · JPL
766718	2014 OD_{402}	—	July 30, 2014	Kitt Peak	Spacewatch	·	1.5 km	MPC · JPL
766719	2014 OE_{402}	—	July 30, 2014	Haleakala	Pan-STARRS 1	·	1.2 km	MPC · JPL
766720	2014 OK_{403}	—	March 28, 2008	Kitt Peak	Spacewatch	·	1.3 km	MPC · JPL
766721	2014 OJ_{405}	—	September 17, 2010	Mount Lemmon	Mount Lemmon Survey	·	1.3 km	MPC · JPL
766722	2014 OX_{405}	—	March 19, 2013	Haleakala	Pan-STARRS 1	·	1.2 km	MPC · JPL
766723	2014 OC_{406}	—	July 25, 2014	Haleakala	Pan-STARRS 1	·	1.4 km	MPC · JPL
766724	2014 OC_{408}	—	July 25, 2014	Haleakala	Pan-STARRS 1	·	1.1 km	MPC · JPL
766725	2014 OD_{408}	—	July 25, 2014	Haleakala	Pan-STARRS 1	·	1.2 km	MPC · JPL
766726	2014 OY_{408}	—	July 25, 2014	Haleakala	Pan-STARRS 1	·	1.4 km	MPC · JPL
766727	2014 OJ_{409}	—	July 25, 2014	Haleakala	Pan-STARRS 1	·	1.7 km	MPC · JPL
766728	2014 OH_{410}	—	June 26, 2014	Mount Lemmon	Mount Lemmon Survey	(5)	960 m	MPC · JPL
766729	2014 OB_{411}	—	July 1, 2014	Haleakala	Pan-STARRS 1	·	1.3 km	MPC · JPL
766730	2014 OJ_{411}	—	July 28, 2014	Haleakala	Pan-STARRS 1	·	1.7 km	MPC · JPL
766731	2014 OV_{411}	—	July 28, 2014	Haleakala	Pan-STARRS 1	·	1.2 km	MPC · JPL
766732	2014 OW_{411}	—	July 28, 2014	Haleakala	Pan-STARRS 1	·	1.5 km	MPC · JPL
766733	2014 OH_{412}	—	July 28, 2014	Haleakala	Pan-STARRS 1	·	2.0 km	MPC · JPL
766734	2014 OK_{412}	—	July 28, 2014	Haleakala	Pan-STARRS 1	·	1.5 km	MPC · JPL
766735	2014 OZ_{414}	—	July 31, 2014	Haleakala	Pan-STARRS 1	·	1.8 km	MPC · JPL
766736	2014 OB_{422}	—	July 27, 2014	Haleakala	Pan-STARRS 1	·	1.5 km	MPC · JPL
766737	2014 OW_{425}	—	January 26, 2017	Haleakala	Pan-STARRS 1	·	910 m	MPC · JPL
766738	2014 OT_{428}	—	July 1, 2014	Haleakala	Pan-STARRS 1	T_{j} (2.97) · 3:2	4.4 km	MPC · JPL
766739	2014 OF_{429}	—	November 22, 2015	Mount Lemmon	Mount Lemmon Survey	·	1.7 km	MPC · JPL
766740	2014 OG_{429}	—	July 28, 2014	Haleakala	Pan-STARRS 1	·	1.3 km	MPC · JPL
766741	2014 OL_{429}	—	July 25, 2014	Haleakala	Pan-STARRS 1	·	1.3 km	MPC · JPL
766742	2014 OH_{430}	—	July 31, 2014	Haleakala	Pan-STARRS 1	·	1.8 km	MPC · JPL
766743	2014 OU_{430}	—	July 31, 2014	Haleakala	Pan-STARRS 1	·	1.2 km	MPC · JPL
766744	2014 OM_{432}	—	July 31, 2014	Haleakala	Pan-STARRS 1	·	1.8 km	MPC · JPL
766745	2014 OO_{432}	—	July 28, 2014	Haleakala	Pan-STARRS 1	HOF	1.7 km	MPC · JPL
766746	2014 OW_{433}	—	July 30, 2014	Haleakala	Pan-STARRS 1	·	1.4 km	MPC · JPL
766747	2014 OG_{438}	—	July 30, 2014	Haleakala	Pan-STARRS 1	·	2.3 km	MPC · JPL
766748	2014 OF_{447}	—	July 27, 2014	Haleakala	Pan-STARRS 1	MAR	750 m	MPC · JPL
766749	2014 OG_{447}	—	July 26, 2014	Haleakala	Pan-STARRS 1	·	1.4 km	MPC · JPL
766750	2014 OQ_{454}	—	July 29, 2014	Haleakala	Pan-STARRS 1	·	900 m	MPC · JPL
766751	2014 OQ_{467}	—	July 31, 2014	Haleakala	Pan-STARRS 1	·	1.3 km	MPC · JPL
766752	2014 PU_{4}	—	January 26, 2012	Mount Lemmon	Mount Lemmon Survey	·	1.5 km	MPC · JPL
766753	2014 PT_{5}	—	October 14, 2010	Mount Lemmon	Mount Lemmon Survey	AGN	870 m	MPC · JPL
766754	2014 PZ_{8}	—	September 23, 2005	Kitt Peak	Spacewatch	·	1.5 km	MPC · JPL
766755	2014 PK_{10}	—	August 4, 2014	Haleakala	Pan-STARRS 1	·	1.4 km	MPC · JPL
766756	2014 PU_{12}	—	August 4, 2014	Haleakala	Pan-STARRS 1	3:2	3.6 km	MPC · JPL
766757	2014 PJ_{13}	—	August 4, 2014	Haleakala	Pan-STARRS 1	·	1.4 km	MPC · JPL
766758	2014 PW_{15}	—	February 14, 2013	Kitt Peak	Spacewatch	·	1.1 km	MPC · JPL
766759	2014 PU_{16}	—	March 16, 2012	Mount Lemmon	Mount Lemmon Survey	·	2.3 km	MPC · JPL
766760	2014 PX_{17}	—	July 25, 2014	Haleakala	Pan-STARRS 1	·	1.2 km	MPC · JPL
766761	2014 PW_{20}	—	July 25, 2014	Haleakala	Pan-STARRS 1	·	1.3 km	MPC · JPL
766762	2014 PO_{21}	—	March 17, 2013	Mount Lemmon	Mount Lemmon Survey	·	660 m	MPC · JPL
766763	2014 PO_{22}	—	June 26, 2014	Haleakala	Pan-STARRS 1	·	1.5 km	MPC · JPL
766764	2014 PW_{23}	—	September 26, 2005	Kitt Peak	Spacewatch	AGN	950 m	MPC · JPL
766765	2014 PQ_{28}	—	November 4, 2005	Mount Lemmon	Mount Lemmon Survey	KOR	1.1 km	MPC · JPL
766766	2014 PS_{33}	—	August 4, 2014	Haleakala	Pan-STARRS 1	·	1.4 km	MPC · JPL
766767	2014 PW_{37}	—	November 13, 2010	Mount Lemmon	Mount Lemmon Survey	HOF	1.9 km	MPC · JPL
766768	2014 PL_{38}	—	April 17, 2013	Haleakala	Pan-STARRS 1	·	1.6 km	MPC · JPL
766769	2014 PZ_{45}	—	August 4, 2014	Haleakala	Pan-STARRS 1	·	1.6 km	MPC · JPL
766770	2014 PH_{50}	—	October 9, 2010	Mount Lemmon	Mount Lemmon Survey	·	1.2 km	MPC · JPL
766771	2014 PJ_{52}	—	July 26, 2014	Haleakala	Pan-STARRS 1	HNS	910 m	MPC · JPL
766772	2014 PZ_{61}	—	May 27, 2014	Mount Lemmon	Mount Lemmon Survey	·	1.7 km	MPC · JPL
766773	2014 PG_{67}	—	September 20, 2011	Kitt Peak	Spacewatch	·	460 m	MPC · JPL
766774	2014 PP_{67}	—	May 7, 2013	Mauna Kea	D. J. Tholen, M. Micheli	·	1.2 km	MPC · JPL
766775	2014 PJ_{69}	—	July 25, 2014	Haleakala	Pan-STARRS 1	·	1.3 km	MPC · JPL
766776	2014 PO_{69}	—	July 25, 2014	Haleakala	Pan-STARRS 1	·	1.3 km	MPC · JPL
766777	2014 PH_{72}	—	August 4, 2014	Haleakala	Pan-STARRS 1	·	1.4 km	MPC · JPL
766778	2014 PC_{73}	—	March 27, 2008	Mount Lemmon	Mount Lemmon Survey	WIT	700 m	MPC · JPL
766779	2014 PG_{73}	—	October 12, 2010	Mount Lemmon	Mount Lemmon Survey	·	1.5 km	MPC · JPL
766780	2014 PV_{73}	—	August 14, 2014	Haleakala	Pan-STARRS 1	·	1.4 km	MPC · JPL
766781	2014 PL_{74}	—	September 12, 2005	Kitt Peak	Spacewatch	·	1.4 km	MPC · JPL
766782	2014 PA_{75}	—	August 3, 2014	Haleakala	Pan-STARRS 1	·	1.3 km	MPC · JPL
766783	2014 PM_{75}	—	September 10, 2010	Mount Lemmon	Mount Lemmon Survey	WIT	740 m	MPC · JPL
766784	2014 PS_{75}	—	August 3, 2014	Haleakala	Pan-STARRS 1	·	1.1 km	MPC · JPL
766785	2014 PK_{77}	—	May 18, 2009	Mount Lemmon	Mount Lemmon Survey	·	1.1 km	MPC · JPL
766786	2014 PN_{79}	—	August 14, 2014	Haleakala	Pan-STARRS 1	·	1.5 km	MPC · JPL
766787	2014 PD_{83}	—	August 6, 2014	Haleakala	Pan-STARRS 1	MRX	900 m	MPC · JPL
766788	2014 PF_{89}	—	August 4, 2014	Haleakala	Pan-STARRS 1	·	1.2 km	MPC · JPL
766789	2014 PH_{90}	—	November 6, 2010	Mount Lemmon	Mount Lemmon Survey	·	1.4 km	MPC · JPL
766790	2014 PK_{94}	—	August 3, 2014	Haleakala	Pan-STARRS 1	·	1.3 km	MPC · JPL
766791	2014 PR_{94}	—	August 5, 2014	Haleakala	Pan-STARRS 1	MAR	850 m	MPC · JPL
766792	2014 PS_{96}	—	August 3, 2014	Haleakala	Pan-STARRS 1	·	1.1 km	MPC · JPL
766793	2014 PA_{97}	—	August 3, 2014	Haleakala	Pan-STARRS 1	·	1.5 km	MPC · JPL
766794	2014 PV_{98}	—	August 3, 2014	Haleakala	Pan-STARRS 1	HNS	790 m	MPC · JPL
766795	2014 PL_{99}	—	August 14, 2014	Haleakala	Pan-STARRS 1	·	2.0 km	MPC · JPL
766796	2014 QO_{4}	—	July 4, 2014	Haleakala	Pan-STARRS 1	·	1.3 km	MPC · JPL
766797	2014 QQ_{9}	—	July 3, 2014	Haleakala	Pan-STARRS 1	·	3.6 km	MPC · JPL
766798	2014 QX_{12}	—	June 30, 2014	Mount Lemmon	Mount Lemmon Survey	EUN	980 m	MPC · JPL
766799	2014 QB_{15}	—	August 18, 2014	Haleakala	Pan-STARRS 1	·	1.0 km	MPC · JPL
766800	2014 QB_{16}	—	November 1, 2010	Mount Lemmon	Mount Lemmon Survey	·	1.4 km	MPC · JPL

== 766801–766900 ==
back to top

Designation			Discovery			Properties		Ref
Permanent	Provisional	Named after	Date	Site	Discoverer(s)	Category	Diam.	Ref
766801	2014 QD_{20}	—	October 13, 2010	Mount Lemmon	Mount Lemmon Survey	·	1.3 km	MPC · JPL
766802	2014 QJ_{20}	—	August 18, 2014	Haleakala	Pan-STARRS 1	·	1.2 km	MPC · JPL
766803	2014 QB_{26}	—	April 16, 2007	Mount Lemmon	Mount Lemmon Survey	·	450 m	MPC · JPL
766804	2014 QS_{27}	—	August 6, 2014	Haleakala	Pan-STARRS 1	·	1.5 km	MPC · JPL
766805	2014 QC_{34}	—	July 2, 2014	Haleakala	Pan-STARRS 1	·	2.7 km	MPC · JPL
766806	2014 QV_{35}	—	November 21, 2008	Mount Lemmon	Mount Lemmon Survey	·	400 m	MPC · JPL
766807	2014 QA_{44}	—	April 12, 2013	Haleakala	Pan-STARRS 1	EOS	1.6 km	MPC · JPL
766808	2014 QY_{51}	—	June 3, 2014	Haleakala	Pan-STARRS 1	·	1.7 km	MPC · JPL
766809	2014 QF_{52}	—	July 28, 2014	Haleakala	Pan-STARRS 1	AGN	870 m	MPC · JPL
766810	2014 QH_{52}	—	January 15, 2008	Mount Lemmon	Mount Lemmon Survey	·	1.1 km	MPC · JPL
766811	2014 QU_{52}	—	November 1, 2011	Kitt Peak	Spacewatch	·	830 m	MPC · JPL
766812	2014 QX_{52}	—	July 7, 2014	Haleakala	Pan-STARRS 1	·	1.7 km	MPC · JPL
766813	2014 QT_{55}	—	January 19, 2012	Haleakala	Pan-STARRS 1	·	1.4 km	MPC · JPL
766814	2014 QW_{57}	—	July 28, 2014	Haleakala	Pan-STARRS 1	·	1.2 km	MPC · JPL
766815	2014 QH_{61}	—	June 29, 2014	Haleakala	Pan-STARRS 1	·	1.8 km	MPC · JPL
766816	2014 QM_{63}	—	August 20, 2014	Haleakala	Pan-STARRS 1	·	1.4 km	MPC · JPL
766817	2014 QO_{64}	—	July 28, 2014	Haleakala	Pan-STARRS 1	·	1.2 km	MPC · JPL
766818	2014 QX_{65}	—	February 14, 2012	Haleakala	Pan-STARRS 1	·	1.5 km	MPC · JPL
766819	2014 QG_{66}	—	September 17, 2006	Kitt Peak	Spacewatch	·	890 m	MPC · JPL
766820	2014 QW_{66}	—	August 20, 2014	Haleakala	Pan-STARRS 1	·	1.6 km	MPC · JPL
766821	2014 QL_{71}	—	August 20, 2014	Haleakala	Pan-STARRS 1	EUP	3.5 km	MPC · JPL
766822	2014 QN_{72}	—	August 20, 2014	Haleakala	Pan-STARRS 1	·	1.6 km	MPC · JPL
766823	2014 QY_{73}	—	October 25, 2005	Anderson Mesa	LONEOS	(32418)	1.5 km	MPC · JPL
766824	2014 QZ_{74}	—	May 9, 2013	Haleakala	Pan-STARRS 1	·	1.7 km	MPC · JPL
766825	2014 QA_{76}	—	July 1, 2014	Haleakala	Pan-STARRS 1	·	1.3 km	MPC · JPL
766826	2014 QT_{77}	—	August 20, 2014	Haleakala	Pan-STARRS 1	GEF	850 m	MPC · JPL
766827	2014 QE_{79}	—	June 5, 2014	Haleakala	Pan-STARRS 1	·	520 m	MPC · JPL
766828	2014 QD_{80}	—	October 9, 2010	Mount Lemmon	Mount Lemmon Survey	PAD	1.1 km	MPC · JPL
766829	2014 QV_{80}	—	January 27, 2012	Mount Lemmon	Mount Lemmon Survey	·	1.6 km	MPC · JPL
766830	2014 QJ_{82}	—	June 30, 2014	Mount Lemmon	Mount Lemmon Survey	·	1.5 km	MPC · JPL
766831	2014 QF_{93}	—	January 2, 2012	Kitt Peak	Spacewatch	·	1.0 km	MPC · JPL
766832	2014 QB_{94}	—	June 24, 2014	Haleakala	Pan-STARRS 1	·	1.5 km	MPC · JPL
766833	2014 QT_{96}	—	June 28, 2014	Haleakala	Pan-STARRS 1	·	1.5 km	MPC · JPL
766834	2014 QQ_{98}	—	August 20, 2014	Haleakala	Pan-STARRS 1	·	1.3 km	MPC · JPL
766835	2014 QH_{100}	—	October 11, 2010	Kitt Peak	Spacewatch	·	1.3 km	MPC · JPL
766836	2014 QU_{101}	—	February 28, 2012	Haleakala	Pan-STARRS 1	·	2.1 km	MPC · JPL
766837	2014 QX_{101}	—	September 17, 2010	Kitt Peak	Spacewatch	·	1.3 km	MPC · JPL
766838	2014 QG_{102}	—	August 20, 2014	Haleakala	Pan-STARRS 1	·	1.6 km	MPC · JPL
766839	2014 QT_{104}	—	August 29, 2005	Kitt Peak	Spacewatch	·	1.5 km	MPC · JPL
766840	2014 QH_{105}	—	February 13, 2012	Haleakala	Pan-STARRS 1	MRX	800 m	MPC · JPL
766841	2014 QO_{105}	—	September 9, 2007	Kitt Peak	Spacewatch	·	660 m	MPC · JPL
766842	2014 QV_{107}	—	June 24, 2014	Haleakala	Pan-STARRS 1	·	1.4 km	MPC · JPL
766843	2014 QM_{109}	—	February 13, 2008	Mount Lemmon	Mount Lemmon Survey	·	1.8 km	MPC · JPL
766844	2014 QB_{113}	—	August 20, 2014	Haleakala	Pan-STARRS 1	·	480 m	MPC · JPL
766845	2014 QG_{113}	—	October 3, 2010	Kitt Peak	Spacewatch	NEM	1.5 km	MPC · JPL
766846	2014 QE_{114}	—	August 20, 2014	Haleakala	Pan-STARRS 1	·	1.2 km	MPC · JPL
766847	2014 QQ_{114}	—	August 20, 2014	Haleakala	Pan-STARRS 1	HOF	1.8 km	MPC · JPL
766848	2014 QP_{118}	—	July 28, 2014	Haleakala	Pan-STARRS 1	WIT	770 m	MPC · JPL
766849	2014 QF_{119}	—	January 19, 2012	Haleakala	Pan-STARRS 1	AGN	790 m	MPC · JPL
766850	2014 QQ_{122}	—	March 16, 2007	Mount Lemmon	Mount Lemmon Survey	THM	1.6 km	MPC · JPL
766851	2014 QR_{125}	—	April 20, 2013	Mount Lemmon	Mount Lemmon Survey	·	1.4 km	MPC · JPL
766852	2014 QT_{125}	—	August 20, 2014	Haleakala	Pan-STARRS 1	·	1.5 km	MPC · JPL
766853	2014 QJ_{127}	—	September 18, 2003	Kitt Peak	Spacewatch	·	2.2 km	MPC · JPL
766854	2014 QH_{129}	—	October 1, 2005	Kitt Peak	Spacewatch	·	1.5 km	MPC · JPL
766855	2014 QW_{129}	—	September 4, 2003	Kitt Peak	Spacewatch	·	1.8 km	MPC · JPL
766856	2014 QJ_{131}	—	October 12, 2010	Mount Lemmon	Mount Lemmon Survey	PAD	1.1 km	MPC · JPL
766857	2014 QS_{134}	—	August 14, 2004	Cerro Tololo	Deep Ecliptic Survey	KOR	1.1 km	MPC · JPL
766858	2014 QF_{136}	—	January 26, 2012	Haleakala	Pan-STARRS 1	·	1.2 km	MPC · JPL
766859	2014 QA_{138}	—	September 22, 2009	Mount Lemmon	Mount Lemmon Survey	·	1.8 km	MPC · JPL
766860	2014 QR_{140}	—	August 20, 2014	Haleakala	Pan-STARRS 1	·	1.5 km	MPC · JPL
766861	2014 QJ_{141}	—	September 19, 2009	Mount Lemmon	Mount Lemmon Survey	·	1.7 km	MPC · JPL
766862	2014 QK_{144}	—	November 14, 2010	Kitt Peak	Spacewatch	·	1.5 km	MPC · JPL
766863	2014 QT_{144}	—	November 28, 2010	Mount Lemmon	Mount Lemmon Survey	HOF	1.7 km	MPC · JPL
766864	2014 QZ_{144}	—	February 13, 2002	Apache Point	SDSS	·	1.5 km	MPC · JPL
766865	2014 QM_{147}	—	October 11, 2005	Kitt Peak	Spacewatch	·	1.3 km	MPC · JPL
766866	2014 QN_{148}	—	July 28, 2014	Haleakala	Pan-STARRS 1	MAR	810 m	MPC · JPL
766867	2014 QF_{153}	—	October 4, 1996	Kitt Peak	Spacewatch	·	1.5 km	MPC · JPL
766868	2014 QO_{154}	—	June 29, 2014	Haleakala	Pan-STARRS 1	EUN	820 m	MPC · JPL
766869	2014 QM_{155}	—	March 15, 2004	Kitt Peak	Spacewatch	·	1.5 km	MPC · JPL
766870	2014 QR_{156}	—	August 22, 2014	Haleakala	Pan-STARRS 1	·	2.3 km	MPC · JPL
766871	2014 QD_{157}	—	June 29, 2014	Haleakala	Pan-STARRS 1	·	1.3 km	MPC · JPL
766872	2014 QY_{159}	—	March 6, 2013	Haleakala	Pan-STARRS 1	·	1.4 km	MPC · JPL
766873	2014 QD_{162}	—	October 1, 2010	Kitt Peak	Spacewatch	·	1.3 km	MPC · JPL
766874	2014 QR_{162}	—	June 24, 2014	Mount Lemmon	Mount Lemmon Survey	·	1.8 km	MPC · JPL
766875	2014 QJ_{164}	—	April 10, 2013	Haleakala	Pan-STARRS 1	·	1.4 km	MPC · JPL
766876	2014 QC_{169}	—	August 19, 2014	Haleakala	Pan-STARRS 1	PHO	750 m	MPC · JPL
766877	2014 QG_{174}	—	November 11, 2010	Mount Lemmon	Mount Lemmon Survey	·	1.5 km	MPC · JPL
766878	2014 QW_{190}	—	September 16, 2010	Mount Lemmon	Mount Lemmon Survey	AGN	860 m	MPC · JPL
766879	2014 QY_{193}	—	March 26, 2008	Mount Lemmon	Mount Lemmon Survey	·	1.3 km	MPC · JPL
766880	2014 QR_{194}	—	August 22, 2014	Haleakala	Pan-STARRS 1	·	1.5 km	MPC · JPL
766881	2014 QA_{197}	—	August 22, 2014	Haleakala	Pan-STARRS 1	·	1.0 km	MPC · JPL
766882	2014 QW_{198}	—	August 22, 2014	Haleakala	Pan-STARRS 1	·	410 m	MPC · JPL
766883	2014 QK_{201}	—	October 13, 2005	Kitt Peak	Spacewatch	·	1.3 km	MPC · JPL
766884	2014 QL_{201}	—	August 22, 2014	Haleakala	Pan-STARRS 1	·	1.3 km	MPC · JPL
766885	2014 QD_{203}	—	August 22, 2014	Haleakala	Pan-STARRS 1	·	1.2 km	MPC · JPL
766886	2014 QR_{203}	—	August 22, 2014	Haleakala	Pan-STARRS 1	·	1.6 km	MPC · JPL
766887	2014 QZ_{205}	—	February 23, 2012	Mount Lemmon	Mount Lemmon Survey	KOR	1.0 km	MPC · JPL
766888	2014 QB_{206}	—	August 22, 2014	Haleakala	Pan-STARRS 1	·	1.4 km	MPC · JPL
766889	2014 QJ_{208}	—	March 4, 2013	Haleakala	Pan-STARRS 1	·	1.3 km	MPC · JPL
766890	2014 QK_{211}	—	September 4, 2011	Haleakala	Pan-STARRS 1	·	470 m	MPC · JPL
766891	2014 QR_{211}	—	February 5, 2009	Kitt Peak	Spacewatch	·	560 m	MPC · JPL
766892	2014 QS_{214}	—	September 19, 2011	Haleakala	Pan-STARRS 1	·	620 m	MPC · JPL
766893	2014 QZ_{214}	—	October 12, 2010	Mount Lemmon	Mount Lemmon Survey	·	1.2 km	MPC · JPL
766894	2014 QU_{216}	—	August 22, 2014	Haleakala	Pan-STARRS 1	·	1.4 km	MPC · JPL
766895	2014 QA_{218}	—	December 21, 2006	Kitt Peak	L. H. Wasserman, M. W. Buie	·	1.5 km	MPC · JPL
766896	2014 QA_{219}	—	August 22, 2014	Haleakala	Pan-STARRS 1	·	2.3 km	MPC · JPL
766897	2014 QN_{219}	—	August 22, 2014	Haleakala	Pan-STARRS 1	GEF	780 m	MPC · JPL
766898	2014 QY_{222}	—	September 5, 2010	Mount Lemmon	Mount Lemmon Survey	·	840 m	MPC · JPL
766899	2014 QF_{224}	—	January 18, 2012	Mount Lemmon	Mount Lemmon Survey	·	1.5 km	MPC · JPL
766900	2014 QA_{229}	—	February 23, 2007	Mount Lemmon	Mount Lemmon Survey	·	1.5 km	MPC · JPL

== 766901–767000 ==
back to top

Designation			Discovery			Properties		Ref
Permanent	Provisional	Named after	Date	Site	Discoverer(s)	Category	Diam.	Ref
766901	2014 QA_{232}	—	August 22, 2014	Haleakala	Pan-STARRS 1	·	1.4 km	MPC · JPL
766902	2014 QN_{234}	—	January 4, 2011	Mount Lemmon	Mount Lemmon Survey	·	2.0 km	MPC · JPL
766903	2014 QE_{241}	—	September 26, 2005	Kitt Peak	Spacewatch	MRX	860 m	MPC · JPL
766904	2014 QJ_{241}	—	July 7, 2014	Haleakala	Pan-STARRS 1	·	1.4 km	MPC · JPL
766905	2014 QK_{243}	—	February 3, 2012	Haleakala	Pan-STARRS 1	·	1.3 km	MPC · JPL
766906	2014 QJ_{245}	—	March 14, 2013	Kitt Peak	Spacewatch	EUN	860 m	MPC · JPL
766907	2014 QE_{246}	—	August 22, 2014	Haleakala	Pan-STARRS 1	·	1.5 km	MPC · JPL
766908	2014 QA_{247}	—	June 15, 2009	Mount Lemmon	Mount Lemmon Survey	·	1.5 km	MPC · JPL
766909	2014 QY_{250}	—	January 4, 2011	Mount Lemmon	Mount Lemmon Survey	·	2.2 km	MPC · JPL
766910	2014 QR_{255}	—	August 22, 2014	Haleakala	Pan-STARRS 1	·	1.4 km	MPC · JPL
766911	2014 QE_{256}	—	August 22, 2014	Haleakala	Pan-STARRS 1	·	1.6 km	MPC · JPL
766912	2014 QE_{259}	—	April 19, 2013	Mount Lemmon	Mount Lemmon Survey	·	1.3 km	MPC · JPL
766913	2014 QN_{259}	—	August 22, 2014	Haleakala	Pan-STARRS 1	·	1.7 km	MPC · JPL
766914	2014 QJ_{260}	—	July 10, 2005	Kitt Peak	Spacewatch	·	1.3 km	MPC · JPL
766915	2014 QM_{261}	—	August 22, 2014	Haleakala	Pan-STARRS 1	EOS	2.0 km	MPC · JPL
766916	2014 QB_{262}	—	August 22, 2014	Haleakala	Pan-STARRS 1	·	1.4 km	MPC · JPL
766917	2014 QO_{267}	—	August 28, 2005	Kitt Peak	Spacewatch	·	1.4 km	MPC · JPL
766918	2014 QB_{271}	—	July 1, 2014	Mount Lemmon	Mount Lemmon Survey	·	1.6 km	MPC · JPL
766919	2014 QP_{271}	—	December 22, 2012	Haleakala	Pan-STARRS 1	·	1.2 km	MPC · JPL
766920	2014 QT_{272}	—	July 30, 2014	Haleakala	Pan-STARRS 1	·	1.2 km	MPC · JPL
766921	2014 QX_{272}	—	March 16, 2012	Mount Lemmon	Mount Lemmon Survey	·	2.8 km	MPC · JPL
766922	2014 QO_{275}	—	July 29, 2014	Haleakala	Pan-STARRS 1	·	1.6 km	MPC · JPL
766923	2014 QC_{276}	—	July 28, 2014	Haleakala	Pan-STARRS 1	·	1.3 km	MPC · JPL
766924	2014 QK_{279}	—	August 31, 2005	Kitt Peak	Spacewatch	·	1.6 km	MPC · JPL
766925	2014 QY_{282}	—	June 28, 2014	Haleakala	Pan-STARRS 1	EUN	1.1 km	MPC · JPL
766926	2014 QF_{285}	—	August 25, 2014	Haleakala	Pan-STARRS 1	·	1.3 km	MPC · JPL
766927	2014 QP_{286}	—	August 25, 2014	Haleakala	Pan-STARRS 1	·	1.7 km	MPC · JPL
766928	2014 QF_{287}	—	August 25, 2014	Haleakala	Pan-STARRS 1	·	1.6 km	MPC · JPL
766929	2014 QT_{289}	—	August 25, 2014	Haleakala	Pan-STARRS 1	·	1.7 km	MPC · JPL
766930	2014 QU_{292}	—	August 5, 2014	Haleakala	Pan-STARRS 1	·	1.6 km	MPC · JPL
766931	2014 QR_{294}	—	August 25, 2014	Haleakala	Pan-STARRS 1	·	1.5 km	MPC · JPL
766932	2014 QD_{295}	—	August 25, 2014	Haleakala	Pan-STARRS 1	·	2.0 km	MPC · JPL
766933	2014 QX_{299}	—	August 3, 2014	Haleakala	Pan-STARRS 1	·	1.4 km	MPC · JPL
766934	2014 QR_{303}	—	August 22, 2014	Haleakala	Pan-STARRS 1	·	1.5 km	MPC · JPL
766935	2014 QS_{303}	—	April 30, 2008	Mount Lemmon	Mount Lemmon Survey	·	1.6 km	MPC · JPL
766936	2014 QW_{305}	—	April 6, 2008	Kitt Peak	Spacewatch	HOF	2.0 km	MPC · JPL
766937	2014 QQ_{311}	—	August 29, 2006	Kitt Peak	Spacewatch	·	930 m	MPC · JPL
766938	2014 QG_{313}	—	October 3, 2010	Kitt Peak	Spacewatch	·	1.3 km	MPC · JPL
766939	2014 QG_{315}	—	June 27, 2014	Haleakala	Pan-STARRS 1	VER	2.1 km	MPC · JPL
766940	2014 QL_{315}	—	September 13, 2005	Kitt Peak	Spacewatch	·	1.4 km	MPC · JPL
766941	2014 QJ_{317}	—	August 15, 2014	Haleakala	Pan-STARRS 1	·	1.2 km	MPC · JPL
766942	2014 QM_{332}	—	March 2, 2011	Kitt Peak	Spacewatch	·	2.8 km	MPC · JPL
766943	2014 QD_{338}	—	November 30, 2008	Mount Lemmon	Mount Lemmon Survey	·	430 m	MPC · JPL
766944	2014 QG_{338}	—	July 28, 2014	Haleakala	Pan-STARRS 1	HOF	1.9 km	MPC · JPL
766945	2014 QY_{340}	—	October 11, 2010	Mount Lemmon	Mount Lemmon Survey	·	1.3 km	MPC · JPL
766946	2014 QM_{341}	—	October 11, 2010	Mount Lemmon	Mount Lemmon Survey	HOF	2.1 km	MPC · JPL
766947	2014 QT_{342}	—	July 25, 2014	Haleakala	Pan-STARRS 1	EUN	840 m	MPC · JPL
766948	2014 QV_{342}	—	July 25, 2014	Haleakala	Pan-STARRS 1	·	1.4 km	MPC · JPL
766949	2014 QW_{342}	—	July 25, 2014	Haleakala	Pan-STARRS 1	·	1.5 km	MPC · JPL
766950	2014 QZ_{342}	—	October 17, 2010	Mount Lemmon	Mount Lemmon Survey	AST	1.2 km	MPC · JPL
766951	2014 QU_{345}	—	June 29, 2014	Haleakala	Pan-STARRS 1	·	2.1 km	MPC · JPL
766952	2014 QJ_{348}	—	July 31, 2014	Haleakala	Pan-STARRS 1	·	1.2 km	MPC · JPL
766953	2014 QB_{349}	—	August 27, 2014	Haleakala	Pan-STARRS 1	·	1.7 km	MPC · JPL
766954	2014 QR_{351}	—	August 27, 2014	Haleakala	Pan-STARRS 1	·	1.6 km	MPC · JPL
766955	2014 QQ_{352}	—	August 27, 2014	Haleakala	Pan-STARRS 1	·	1.4 km	MPC · JPL
766956	2014 QZ_{352}	—	July 31, 2014	Haleakala	Pan-STARRS 1	·	520 m	MPC · JPL
766957	2014 QO_{355}	—	August 27, 2014	Haleakala	Pan-STARRS 1	·	2.1 km	MPC · JPL
766958	2014 QY_{360}	—	July 30, 2014	Haleakala	Pan-STARRS 1	·	1.4 km	MPC · JPL
766959	2014 QA_{363}	—	August 25, 2014	Haleakala	Pan-STARRS 1	·	580 m	MPC · JPL
766960	2014 QO_{369}	—	September 12, 2001	Kitt Peak	Deep Ecliptic Survey	·	1.3 km	MPC · JPL
766961	2014 QA_{376}	—	March 4, 2012	Mount Lemmon	Mount Lemmon Survey	·	1.5 km	MPC · JPL
766962	2014 QA_{380}	—	February 19, 2012	Kitt Peak	Spacewatch	·	1.5 km	MPC · JPL
766963	2014 QE_{380}	—	August 27, 2014	Haleakala	Pan-STARRS 1	·	1.8 km	MPC · JPL
766964	2014 QQ_{380}	—	August 27, 2014	Haleakala	Pan-STARRS 1	·	490 m	MPC · JPL
766965	2014 QT_{386}	—	August 29, 2014	Mount Lemmon	Mount Lemmon Survey	·	2.0 km	MPC · JPL
766966	2014 QA_{389}	—	October 25, 2011	Haleakala	Pan-STARRS 1	·	450 m	MPC · JPL
766967	2014 QD_{392}	—	September 25, 2009	Mount Lemmon	Mount Lemmon Survey	·	2.0 km	MPC · JPL
766968	2014 QX_{398}	—	March 18, 2013	Mount Lemmon	Mount Lemmon Survey	·	1.2 km	MPC · JPL
766969	2014 QS_{401}	—	November 13, 2010	Mount Lemmon	Mount Lemmon Survey	·	1.5 km	MPC · JPL
766970	2014 QZ_{401}	—	August 28, 2014	Haleakala	Pan-STARRS 1	·	1.2 km	MPC · JPL
766971	2014 QN_{407}	—	August 29, 2005	Kitt Peak	Spacewatch	·	1.4 km	MPC · JPL
766972	2014 QF_{413}	—	July 4, 2014	Haleakala	Pan-STARRS 1	·	1.4 km	MPC · JPL
766973	2014 QE_{416}	—	August 30, 2014	Kitt Peak	Spacewatch	·	1.5 km	MPC · JPL
766974	2014 QN_{416}	—	October 31, 2010	Mount Lemmon	Mount Lemmon Survey	AGN	900 m	MPC · JPL
766975	2014 QO_{416}	—	August 22, 2014	Haleakala	Pan-STARRS 1	·	1.2 km	MPC · JPL
766976	2014 QW_{419}	—	September 23, 2001	Kitt Peak	Spacewatch	·	1.2 km	MPC · JPL
766977	2014 QC_{424}	—	August 27, 2009	Kitt Peak	Spacewatch	·	1.6 km	MPC · JPL
766978	2014 QO_{424}	—	August 31, 2014	Catalina	CSS	·	1.5 km	MPC · JPL
766979	2014 QD_{443}	—	August 18, 2014	Haleakala	Pan-STARRS 1	H	390 m	MPC · JPL
766980	2014 QY_{443}	—	August 31, 2014	Haleakala	Pan-STARRS 1	H	330 m	MPC · JPL
766981	2014 QG_{444}	—	January 29, 2011	Kitt Peak	Spacewatch	·	2.3 km	MPC · JPL
766982	2014 QN_{446}	—	September 29, 2005	Mount Lemmon	Mount Lemmon Survey	AGN	830 m	MPC · JPL
766983	2014 QS_{446}	—	August 27, 2014	Haleakala	Pan-STARRS 1	HNS	970 m	MPC · JPL
766984	2014 QM_{448}	—	October 27, 2005	Mount Lemmon	Mount Lemmon Survey	·	1.6 km	MPC · JPL
766985	2014 QY_{448}	—	August 22, 2014	Haleakala	Pan-STARRS 1	·	730 m	MPC · JPL
766986	2014 QF_{449}	—	January 18, 2012	Mount Lemmon	Mount Lemmon Survey	·	1.0 km	MPC · JPL
766987	2014 QP_{451}	—	January 20, 2012	Kitt Peak	Spacewatch	·	1.3 km	MPC · JPL
766988	2014 QR_{451}	—	August 20, 2014	Haleakala	Pan-STARRS 1	·	1.4 km	MPC · JPL
766989	2014 QT_{451}	—	August 20, 2014	Haleakala	Pan-STARRS 1	·	1.3 km	MPC · JPL
766990	2014 QU_{451}	—	August 20, 2014	Haleakala	Pan-STARRS 1	WIT	760 m	MPC · JPL
766991	2014 QF_{452}	—	April 29, 2008	Mount Lemmon	Mount Lemmon Survey	·	1.7 km	MPC · JPL
766992	2014 QJ_{454}	—	August 27, 2014	Haleakala	Pan-STARRS 1	·	1.5 km	MPC · JPL
766993	2014 QO_{454}	—	April 24, 2009	Mount Lemmon	Mount Lemmon Survey	EUN	1 km	MPC · JPL
766994	2014 QA_{455}	—	September 21, 2009	Mount Lemmon	Mount Lemmon Survey	HYG	2.0 km	MPC · JPL
766995	2014 QO_{455}	—	August 25, 2014	Haleakala	Pan-STARRS 1	·	2.0 km	MPC · JPL
766996	2014 QY_{455}	—	September 11, 2010	Mount Lemmon	Mount Lemmon Survey	·	1.4 km	MPC · JPL
766997	2014 QE_{457}	—	August 23, 2014	Haleakala	Pan-STARRS 1	·	770 m	MPC · JPL
766998	2014 QF_{459}	—	August 20, 2014	Haleakala	Pan-STARRS 1	·	1.6 km	MPC · JPL
766999	2014 QN_{459}	—	August 20, 2014	Haleakala	Pan-STARRS 1	·	1.3 km	MPC · JPL
767000	2014 QO_{459}	—	November 1, 2010	Mount Lemmon	Mount Lemmon Survey	·	1.4 km	MPC · JPL

back to top
