= List of minor planets: 802001–803000 =

The following is a partial list of minor planets, running from minor-planet number 802001 through 803000, inclusive. The primary data for this and other partial lists is based on JPL's "Small-Body Orbital Elements" and data available from the Minor Planet Center. Critical list information is also provided by the MPC, unless otherwise specified from Lowell Observatory. A detailed description of the table's columns and additional sources are given on the main page including a complete list of every page in this series, and a statistical break-up on the dynamical classification of minor planets.

Also see the summary list of all named bodies in numerical and alphabetical order, and the corresponding naming citations for the number range of this particular list. New namings may only be added to this list after official publication, as the preannouncement of names is condemned by the Working Group for Small Bodies Nomenclature of the International Astronomical Union.

Near-Earth obj.	MBA (inner)	MBA (outer)	Centaur
Mars-crosser	MBA (middle)	Jupiter trojan	Trans-Neptunian obj.
Unclassified

== 802001–802100 ==
Designation			Discovery			Properties		Ref
Permanent	Provisional	Named after	Date	Site	Discoverer(s)	Category	Diam.	Ref
802001	2015 AT_{75}	—	January 13, 2015	Haleakala	Pan-STARRS 1	·	1.2 km	MPC · JPL
802002	2015 AJ_{78}	—	April 2, 2005	Mount Lemmon	Mount Lemmon Survey	·	2.1 km	MPC · JPL
802003	2015 AN_{80}	—	October 31, 2008	Mount Lemmon	Mount Lemmon Survey	·	1.5 km	MPC · JPL
802004	2015 AK_{83}	—	September 10, 2013	Haleakala	Pan-STARRS 1	·	1.5 km	MPC · JPL
802005	2015 AJ_{84}	—	December 21, 2014	Haleakala	Pan-STARRS 1	(21885)	2.1 km	MPC · JPL
802006	2015 AC_{86}	—	January 13, 2015	Haleakala	Pan-STARRS 1	·	1.9 km	MPC · JPL
802007	2015 AK_{87}	—	January 13, 2015	Haleakala	Pan-STARRS 1	·	1.3 km	MPC · JPL
802008	2015 AH_{91}	—	December 21, 2014	Haleakala	Pan-STARRS 1	·	1.1 km	MPC · JPL
802009	2015 AV_{91}	—	July 30, 2000	Cerro Tololo	Deep Ecliptic Survey	·	1.9 km	MPC · JPL
802010	2015 AW_{93}	—	November 7, 2005	Mauna Kea	A. Boattini	·	1.6 km	MPC · JPL
802011	2015 AO_{96}	—	January 14, 2015	Haleakala	Pan-STARRS 1	HNS	740 m	MPC · JPL
802012	2015 AS_{96}	—	January 14, 2015	Haleakala	Pan-STARRS 1	·	2.4 km	MPC · JPL
802013	2015 AS_{98}	—	January 14, 2015	Haleakala	Pan-STARRS 1	·	1.3 km	MPC · JPL
802014	2015 AX_{99}	—	December 21, 2014	Mount Lemmon	Mount Lemmon Survey	EOS	1.4 km	MPC · JPL
802015	2015 AK_{102}	—	January 14, 2015	Haleakala	Pan-STARRS 1	·	1.2 km	MPC · JPL
802016	2015 AJ_{103}	—	December 21, 2014	Mount Lemmon	Mount Lemmon Survey	·	2.3 km	MPC · JPL
802017	2015 AL_{105}	—	October 9, 2013	Mount Lemmon	Mount Lemmon Survey	·	1.3 km	MPC · JPL
802018	2015 AO_{105}	—	September 13, 2013	Kitt Peak	Spacewatch	WIT	730 m	MPC · JPL
802019	2015 AW_{105}	—	January 14, 2015	Haleakala	Pan-STARRS 1	·	2.0 km	MPC · JPL
802020	2015 AM_{106}	—	February 5, 2011	Mount Lemmon	Mount Lemmon Survey	·	970 m	MPC · JPL
802021	2015 AV_{109}	—	December 21, 2014	Haleakala	Pan-STARRS 1	·	1.3 km	MPC · JPL
802022	2015 AR_{112}	—	December 21, 2014	Haleakala	Pan-STARRS 1	·	1.6 km	MPC · JPL
802023	2015 AR_{119}	—	September 1, 2013	Haleakala	Pan-STARRS 1	·	1.4 km	MPC · JPL
802024	2015 AA_{121}	—	January 14, 2015	Haleakala	Pan-STARRS 1	·	1.2 km	MPC · JPL
802025	2015 AW_{127}	—	September 14, 2013	Haleakala	Pan-STARRS 1	·	1.1 km	MPC · JPL
802026	2015 AA_{129}	—	December 21, 2014	Haleakala	Pan-STARRS 1	·	1.3 km	MPC · JPL
802027	2015 AZ_{132}	—	January 14, 2015	Haleakala	Pan-STARRS 1	·	1.7 km	MPC · JPL
802028	2015 AS_{137}	—	January 14, 2015	Haleakala	Pan-STARRS 1	·	1.3 km	MPC · JPL
802029	2015 AD_{140}	—	January 14, 2015	Haleakala	Pan-STARRS 1	·	2.0 km	MPC · JPL
802030	2015 AR_{140}	—	January 14, 2015	Haleakala	Pan-STARRS 1	KOR	880 m	MPC · JPL
802031	2015 AU_{140}	—	November 17, 2009	Kitt Peak	Spacewatch	·	1.0 km	MPC · JPL
802032	2015 AE_{144}	—	October 3, 2013	Haleakala	Pan-STARRS 1	·	1.5 km	MPC · JPL
802033	2015 AC_{147}	—	December 20, 2009	Mount Lemmon	Mount Lemmon Survey	·	1.4 km	MPC · JPL
802034	2015 AS_{147}	—	August 4, 2005	Palomar Mountain	NEAT	(5)	780 m	MPC · JPL
802035	2015 AG_{148}	—	January 14, 2015	Haleakala	Pan-STARRS 1	·	1.4 km	MPC · JPL
802036	2015 AN_{148}	—	January 14, 2015	Haleakala	Pan-STARRS 1	·	1.4 km	MPC · JPL
802037	2015 AT_{151}	—	September 16, 2009	Kitt Peak	Spacewatch	(5)	820 m	MPC · JPL
802038	2015 AN_{152}	—	January 14, 2015	Haleakala	Pan-STARRS 1	·	1.5 km	MPC · JPL
802039	2015 AU_{152}	—	December 21, 2014	Haleakala	Pan-STARRS 1	NEM	1.4 km	MPC · JPL
802040	2015 AY_{153}	—	January 14, 2015	Haleakala	Pan-STARRS 1	·	1.5 km	MPC · JPL
802041	2015 AK_{154}	—	December 21, 2014	Haleakala	Pan-STARRS 1	·	1.5 km	MPC · JPL
802042	2015 AS_{154}	—	January 14, 2015	Haleakala	Pan-STARRS 1	·	1.6 km	MPC · JPL
802043	2015 AU_{161}	—	January 14, 2002	Roque de los Muchachos	T. Grav	·	970 m	MPC · JPL
802044	2015 AT_{162}	—	January 14, 2015	Haleakala	Pan-STARRS 1	KOR	800 m	MPC · JPL
802045	2015 AH_{163}	—	December 21, 2014	Mount Lemmon	Mount Lemmon Survey	AGN	840 m	MPC · JPL
802046	2015 AC_{165}	—	January 14, 2015	Haleakala	Pan-STARRS 1	·	1.1 km	MPC · JPL
802047	2015 AZ_{167}	—	July 14, 2013	Haleakala	Pan-STARRS 1	ADE	1.5 km	MPC · JPL
802048	2015 AO_{172}	—	September 16, 2013	Mount Lemmon	Mount Lemmon Survey	·	1.2 km	MPC · JPL
802049	2015 AR_{173}	—	January 14, 2015	Haleakala	Pan-STARRS 1	·	1.3 km	MPC · JPL
802050	2015 AJ_{175}	—	January 14, 2015	Haleakala	Pan-STARRS 1	·	1.5 km	MPC · JPL
802051	2015 AD_{176}	—	January 14, 2015	Haleakala	Pan-STARRS 1	·	2.2 km	MPC · JPL
802052	2015 AW_{178}	—	January 14, 2015	Haleakala	Pan-STARRS 1	·	1.5 km	MPC · JPL
802053	2015 AD_{183}	—	January 25, 2006	Kitt Peak	Spacewatch	·	1.3 km	MPC · JPL
802054	2015 AJ_{183}	—	October 3, 2013	Mount Lemmon	Mount Lemmon Survey	·	1.3 km	MPC · JPL
802055	2015 AB_{184}	—	January 14, 2015	Haleakala	Pan-STARRS 1	AGN	780 m	MPC · JPL
802056	2015 AC_{186}	—	January 14, 2015	Haleakala	Pan-STARRS 1	·	1.4 km	MPC · JPL
802057	2015 AH_{188}	—	January 14, 2015	Haleakala	Pan-STARRS 1	·	1.5 km	MPC · JPL
802058	2015 AK_{194}	—	July 13, 2001	Palomar Mountain	NEAT	THB	2.3 km	MPC · JPL
802059	2015 AL_{198}	—	February 8, 2011	Mount Lemmon	Mount Lemmon Survey	·	1.2 km	MPC · JPL
802060	2015 AN_{202}	—	January 30, 2011	Haleakala	Pan-STARRS 1	·	1.3 km	MPC · JPL
802061	2015 AK_{206}	—	August 15, 2013	Haleakala	Pan-STARRS 1	·	1.6 km	MPC · JPL
802062	2015 AB_{209}	—	November 21, 2014	Haleakala	Pan-STARRS 1	·	1.3 km	MPC · JPL
802063	2015 AL_{211}	—	January 15, 2015	Haleakala	Pan-STARRS 1	NAE	1.4 km	MPC · JPL
802064	2015 AS_{215}	—	January 15, 2015	Haleakala	Pan-STARRS 1	·	1.6 km	MPC · JPL
802065	2015 AS_{216}	—	December 11, 2009	Mount Lemmon	Mount Lemmon Survey	GAL	1.6 km	MPC · JPL
802066	2015 AJ_{217}	—	January 15, 2015	Haleakala	Pan-STARRS 1	·	1.5 km	MPC · JPL
802067	2015 AY_{217}	—	January 15, 2015	Haleakala	Pan-STARRS 1	3:2	4.5 km	MPC · JPL
802068	2015 AU_{220}	—	January 15, 2015	Haleakala	Pan-STARRS 1	·	1.1 km	MPC · JPL
802069	2015 AQ_{222}	—	December 18, 2014	Haleakala	Pan-STARRS 1	·	1.9 km	MPC · JPL
802070	2015 AR_{226}	—	January 15, 2015	Haleakala	Pan-STARRS 1	·	1.4 km	MPC · JPL
802071	2015 AZ_{226}	—	August 15, 2013	Haleakala	Pan-STARRS 1	·	1.3 km	MPC · JPL
802072	2015 AB_{228}	—	March 13, 2004	Palomar Mountain	NEAT	·	2.2 km	MPC · JPL
802073	2015 AG_{231}	—	October 25, 2009	Kitt Peak	Spacewatch	·	1.1 km	MPC · JPL
802074	2015 AZ_{232}	—	December 26, 2009	Kitt Peak	Spacewatch	·	1.5 km	MPC · JPL
802075	2015 AM_{240}	—	January 15, 2015	Haleakala	Pan-STARRS 1	·	1.1 km	MPC · JPL
802076	2015 AN_{249}	—	January 13, 2015	Haleakala	Pan-STARRS 1	·	1.4 km	MPC · JPL
802077	2015 AM_{254}	—	December 21, 2014	Haleakala	Pan-STARRS 1	·	1.3 km	MPC · JPL
802078	2015 AL_{261}	—	February 27, 2012	Haleakala	Pan-STARRS 1	·	540 m	MPC · JPL
802079	2015 AL_{265}	—	August 15, 2013	Haleakala	Pan-STARRS 1	·	970 m	MPC · JPL
802080	2015 AT_{265}	—	September 14, 2013	Haleakala	Pan-STARRS 1	·	1.5 km	MPC · JPL
802081	2015 AS_{266}	—	January 13, 2015	Haleakala	Pan-STARRS 1	·	1.1 km	MPC · JPL
802082	2015 AN_{268}	—	November 16, 2009	Mount Lemmon	Mount Lemmon Survey	·	1.2 km	MPC · JPL
802083	2015 AR_{268}	—	January 13, 2015	Haleakala	Pan-STARRS 1	·	890 m	MPC · JPL
802084	2015 AL_{275}	—	January 14, 2015	Haleakala	Pan-STARRS 1	·	1.3 km	MPC · JPL
802085	2015 AU_{275}	—	January 15, 2015	Mount Lemmon	Mount Lemmon Survey	615	820 m	MPC · JPL
802086	2015 AL_{278}	—	January 15, 2015	Haleakala	Pan-STARRS 1	GEF	820 m	MPC · JPL
802087	2015 AQ_{278}	—	February 27, 2006	Kitt Peak	Spacewatch	·	1.6 km	MPC · JPL
802088	2015 AW_{281}	—	January 15, 2015	Haleakala	Pan-STARRS 1	L5	7.7 km	MPC · JPL
802089	2015 AC_{284}	—	December 10, 2014	Haleakala	Pan-STARRS 1	·	1.3 km	MPC · JPL
802090	2015 AJ_{284}	—	November 17, 2009	Mount Lemmon	Mount Lemmon Survey	·	1.2 km	MPC · JPL
802091	2015 AX_{285}	—	January 14, 2015	Haleakala	Pan-STARRS 1	HYG	1.9 km	MPC · JPL
802092	2015 AD_{286}	—	August 14, 2012	Haleakala	Pan-STARRS 1	·	2.3 km	MPC · JPL
802093	2015 AV_{286}	—	April 26, 2011	Mount Lemmon	Mount Lemmon Survey	·	1.7 km	MPC · JPL
802094	2015 AR_{292}	—	January 15, 2015	Haleakala	Pan-STARRS 1	EUN	870 m	MPC · JPL
802095	2015 AU_{292}	—	January 17, 2015	Haleakala	Pan-STARRS 1	·	2.6 km	MPC · JPL
802096	2015 AP_{293}	—	January 21, 2015	Haleakala	Pan-STARRS 1	EOS	1.3 km	MPC · JPL
802097	2015 AO_{298}	—	January 14, 2015	Haleakala	Pan-STARRS 1	VER	2.0 km	MPC · JPL
802098	2015 AP_{298}	—	January 14, 2015	Haleakala	Pan-STARRS 1	BRA	930 m	MPC · JPL
802099	2015 AZ_{301}	—	January 13, 2015	Haleakala	Pan-STARRS 1	·	1.4 km	MPC · JPL
802100	2015 AX_{302}	—	January 11, 2015	Haleakala	Pan-STARRS 1	BRA	1.2 km	MPC · JPL

== 802101–802200 ==
back to top

Designation			Discovery			Properties		Ref
Permanent	Provisional	Named after	Date	Site	Discoverer(s)	Category	Diam.	Ref
802101	2015 AK_{303}	—	January 15, 2015	Mount Lemmon	Mount Lemmon Survey	·	1.6 km	MPC · JPL
802102	2015 AO_{303}	—	January 15, 2015	Mount Lemmon	Mount Lemmon Survey	·	1.4 km	MPC · JPL
802103	2015 AB_{305}	—	January 15, 2015	Mount Lemmon	Mount Lemmon Survey	·	1.5 km	MPC · JPL
802104	2015 AX_{306}	—	January 15, 2015	Haleakala	Pan-STARRS 1	·	1.5 km	MPC · JPL
802105	2015 AA_{307}	—	January 14, 2015	Haleakala	Pan-STARRS 1	·	1.4 km	MPC · JPL
802106	2015 AR_{308}	—	January 14, 2015	Haleakala	Pan-STARRS 1	·	1.3 km	MPC · JPL
802107	2015 BR_{9}	—	March 2, 2011	Mount Lemmon	Mount Lemmon Survey	·	1.3 km	MPC · JPL
802108	2015 BX_{10}	—	December 29, 2014	Haleakala	Pan-STARRS 1	·	1.4 km	MPC · JPL
802109	2015 BA_{12}	—	November 30, 2014	Haleakala	Pan-STARRS 1	·	1.6 km	MPC · JPL
802110	2015 BH_{12}	—	October 1, 2013	Mount Lemmon	Mount Lemmon Survey	·	1.4 km	MPC · JPL
802111	2015 BA_{15}	—	December 21, 2014	Haleakala	Pan-STARRS 1	·	1.2 km	MPC · JPL
802112	2015 BC_{16}	—	January 16, 2015	Mount Lemmon	Mount Lemmon Survey	·	1.6 km	MPC · JPL
802113	2015 BV_{18}	—	January 16, 2015	Haleakala	Pan-STARRS 1	EOS	1.2 km	MPC · JPL
802114	2015 BE_{19}	—	July 16, 2004	Cerro Tololo	Deep Ecliptic Survey	·	1.1 km	MPC · JPL
802115	2015 BR_{21}	—	September 2, 2010	Mount Lemmon	Mount Lemmon Survey	(883)	580 m	MPC · JPL
802116	2015 BY_{23}	—	May 13, 2011	Mount Lemmon	Mount Lemmon Survey	·	1.6 km	MPC · JPL
802117	2015 BK_{33}	—	January 16, 2015	Haleakala	Pan-STARRS 1	HOF	2.1 km	MPC · JPL
802118	2015 BY_{34}	—	January 16, 2015	Haleakala	Pan-STARRS 1	·	2.2 km	MPC · JPL
802119	2015 BK_{38}	—	January 17, 2015	Mount Lemmon	Mount Lemmon Survey	GEF	870 m	MPC · JPL
802120	2015 BV_{38}	—	October 26, 2008	Mount Lemmon	Mount Lemmon Survey	EOS	1.3 km	MPC · JPL
802121	2015 BN_{39}	—	December 29, 2014	Haleakala	Pan-STARRS 1	·	1.5 km	MPC · JPL
802122	2015 BC_{40}	—	December 29, 2014	Haleakala	Pan-STARRS 1	·	1.3 km	MPC · JPL
802123	2015 BU_{43}	—	November 26, 2014	Haleakala	Pan-STARRS 1	·	1.6 km	MPC · JPL
802124	2015 BM_{44}	—	March 14, 2011	Mount Lemmon	Mount Lemmon Survey	·	1.4 km	MPC · JPL
802125	2015 BE_{46}	—	January 17, 2015	Haleakala	Pan-STARRS 1	·	1.6 km	MPC · JPL
802126	2015 BL_{47}	—	January 17, 2015	Haleakala	Pan-STARRS 1	·	1.3 km	MPC · JPL
802127	2015 BT_{47}	—	March 6, 2011	Kitt Peak	Spacewatch	·	1.4 km	MPC · JPL
802128	2015 BE_{49}	—	April 3, 2011	Haleakala	Pan-STARRS 1	·	1.3 km	MPC · JPL
802129	2015 BR_{49}	—	January 17, 2015	Haleakala	Pan-STARRS 1	·	2.0 km	MPC · JPL
802130	2015 BH_{51}	—	January 17, 2015	Haleakala	Pan-STARRS 1	·	1.7 km	MPC · JPL
802131	2015 BS_{51}	—	January 17, 2015	Haleakala	Pan-STARRS 1	·	910 m	MPC · JPL
802132	2015 BT_{53}	—	January 17, 2015	Haleakala	Pan-STARRS 1	L5	6.9 km	MPC · JPL
802133	2015 BG_{56}	—	January 17, 2015	Mount Lemmon	Mount Lemmon Survey	·	2.1 km	MPC · JPL
802134	2015 BR_{57}	—	January 17, 2015	Haleakala	Pan-STARRS 1	·	1.4 km	MPC · JPL
802135	2015 BC_{59}	—	November 26, 2014	Haleakala	Pan-STARRS 1	·	1.4 km	MPC · JPL
802136	2015 BF_{67}	—	January 17, 2015	Haleakala	Pan-STARRS 1	·	1.7 km	MPC · JPL
802137	2015 BO_{69}	—	January 17, 2015	Haleakala	Pan-STARRS 1	BRA	920 m	MPC · JPL
802138	2015 BO_{72}	—	January 17, 2015	Haleakala	Pan-STARRS 1	·	1.3 km	MPC · JPL
802139	2015 BN_{76}	—	January 17, 2015	Haleakala	Pan-STARRS 1	·	540 m	MPC · JPL
802140	2015 BD_{80}	—	November 25, 2009	Kitt Peak	Spacewatch	·	1.5 km	MPC · JPL
802141	2015 BA_{83}	—	January 18, 2015	Mount Lemmon	Mount Lemmon Survey	DOR	1.7 km	MPC · JPL
802142	2015 BC_{85}	—	August 14, 2013	Haleakala	Pan-STARRS 1	·	1.5 km	MPC · JPL
802143	2015 BR_{88}	—	January 18, 2015	Haleakala	Pan-STARRS 1	·	1.6 km	MPC · JPL
802144	2015 BF_{95}	—	January 16, 2015	Haleakala	Pan-STARRS 1	AST	1.2 km	MPC · JPL
802145	2015 BH_{106}	—	January 16, 2015	Haleakala	Pan-STARRS 1	·	1.3 km	MPC · JPL
802146	2015 BU_{106}	—	September 12, 2013	Catalina	CSS	DOR	2.0 km	MPC · JPL
802147	2015 BW_{106}	—	September 6, 2008	Mount Lemmon	Mount Lemmon Survey	AGN	840 m	MPC · JPL
802148	2015 BJ_{107}	—	January 16, 2015	Haleakala	Pan-STARRS 1	·	2.0 km	MPC · JPL
802149	2015 BU_{110}	—	December 29, 2014	Haleakala	Pan-STARRS 1	PAD	1.1 km	MPC · JPL
802150	2015 BP_{117}	—	January 17, 2015	Mount Lemmon	Mount Lemmon Survey	·	1.5 km	MPC · JPL
802151	2015 BJ_{119}	—	February 26, 2008	Mount Lemmon	Mount Lemmon Survey	·	620 m	MPC · JPL
802152	2015 BW_{123}	—	September 20, 2008	Mount Lemmon	Mount Lemmon Survey	HOF	1.6 km	MPC · JPL
802153	2015 BL_{127}	—	January 17, 2015	Haleakala	Pan-STARRS 1	KOR	990 m	MPC · JPL
802154	2015 BT_{127}	—	September 28, 2001	Palomar Mountain	NEAT	·	740 m	MPC · JPL
802155	2015 BU_{127}	—	January 17, 2015	Haleakala	Pan-STARRS 1	HOF	2.0 km	MPC · JPL
802156	2015 BM_{132}	—	January 17, 2015	Haleakala	Pan-STARRS 1	·	1.2 km	MPC · JPL
802157	2015 BZ_{135}	—	January 17, 2015	Haleakala	Pan-STARRS 1	·	1.5 km	MPC · JPL
802158	2015 BE_{137}	—	February 25, 2006	Kitt Peak	Spacewatch	AGN	900 m	MPC · JPL
802159	2015 BV_{137}	—	November 4, 2004	Kitt Peak	Spacewatch	·	1.3 km	MPC · JPL
802160	2015 BY_{144}	—	January 17, 2015	Haleakala	Pan-STARRS 1	·	1.3 km	MPC · JPL
802161	2015 BF_{147}	—	January 17, 2015	Haleakala	Pan-STARRS 1	·	1.5 km	MPC · JPL
802162	2015 BA_{148}	—	January 17, 2015	Haleakala	Pan-STARRS 1	EOS	1.1 km	MPC · JPL
802163	2015 BL_{148}	—	January 17, 2015	Haleakala	Pan-STARRS 1	·	1.2 km	MPC · JPL
802164	2015 BU_{149}	—	January 17, 2015	Haleakala	Pan-STARRS 1	·	1.5 km	MPC · JPL
802165	2015 BY_{151}	—	January 17, 2015	Haleakala	Pan-STARRS 1	AGN	820 m	MPC · JPL
802166	2015 BP_{152}	—	January 17, 2015	Haleakala	Pan-STARRS 1	KOR	930 m	MPC · JPL
802167	2015 BR_{154}	—	January 17, 2015	Haleakala	Pan-STARRS 1	EOS	1.4 km	MPC · JPL
802168	2015 BZ_{155}	—	January 17, 2015	Haleakala	Pan-STARRS 1	·	2.1 km	MPC · JPL
802169	2015 BP_{158}	—	January 17, 2015	Haleakala	Pan-STARRS 1	·	1.6 km	MPC · JPL
802170	2015 BT_{161}	—	January 17, 2015	Haleakala	Pan-STARRS 1	·	1.6 km	MPC · JPL
802171	2015 BV_{161}	—	January 17, 2015	Haleakala	Pan-STARRS 1	·	1.4 km	MPC · JPL
802172	2015 BW_{162}	—	October 24, 2013	Mount Lemmon	Mount Lemmon Survey	HOF	1.8 km	MPC · JPL
802173	2015 BM_{167}	—	January 17, 2015	Haleakala	Pan-STARRS 1	AGN	910 m	MPC · JPL
802174	2015 BY_{168}	—	January 17, 2015	Haleakala	Pan-STARRS 1	·	1.3 km	MPC · JPL
802175	2015 BF_{170}	—	January 17, 2015	Haleakala	Pan-STARRS 1	AGN	850 m	MPC · JPL
802176	2015 BG_{170}	—	January 17, 2015	Haleakala	Pan-STARRS 1	THM	1.5 km	MPC · JPL
802177	2015 BL_{170}	—	January 17, 2015	Haleakala	Pan-STARRS 1	HOF	1.8 km	MPC · JPL
802178	2015 BL_{172}	—	February 23, 2012	Mount Lemmon	Mount Lemmon Survey	·	600 m	MPC · JPL
802179	2015 BF_{176}	—	January 17, 2015	Haleakala	Pan-STARRS 1	·	1.3 km	MPC · JPL
802180	2015 BB_{177}	—	October 26, 2005	Kitt Peak	Spacewatch	·	820 m	MPC · JPL
802181	2015 BP_{177}	—	January 17, 2015	Haleakala	Pan-STARRS 1	·	1.4 km	MPC · JPL
802182	2015 BD_{178}	—	September 15, 2013	Kitt Peak	Spacewatch	AGN	890 m	MPC · JPL
802183	2015 BV_{179}	—	January 17, 2015	Haleakala	Pan-STARRS 1	·	1.5 km	MPC · JPL
802184	2015 BU_{180}	—	January 17, 2015	Haleakala	Pan-STARRS 1	·	1.5 km	MPC · JPL
802185	2015 BJ_{181}	—	November 4, 2013	Mount Lemmon	Mount Lemmon Survey	·	1.5 km	MPC · JPL
802186	2015 BJ_{183}	—	January 17, 2015	Haleakala	Pan-STARRS 1	·	1.3 km	MPC · JPL
802187	2015 BN_{184}	—	January 17, 2015	Haleakala	Pan-STARRS 1	·	1.1 km	MPC · JPL
802188	2015 BD_{187}	—	November 4, 2013	Mount Lemmon	Mount Lemmon Survey	·	1.2 km	MPC · JPL
802189	2015 BE_{187}	—	October 3, 2013	Kitt Peak	Spacewatch	HOF	1.7 km	MPC · JPL
802190	2015 BK_{188}	—	January 17, 2015	Haleakala	Pan-STARRS 1	AGN	850 m	MPC · JPL
802191	2015 BT_{189}	—	February 17, 2001	Kitt Peak	Spacewatch	·	1.4 km	MPC · JPL
802192	2015 BV_{190}	—	January 9, 2006	Kitt Peak	Spacewatch	·	1.6 km	MPC · JPL
802193	2015 BJ_{192}	—	November 9, 2004	Mauna Kea	P. A. Wiegert, A. Papadimos	·	1.2 km	MPC · JPL
802194	2015 BY_{192}	—	January 17, 2015	Haleakala	Pan-STARRS 1	·	1.5 km	MPC · JPL
802195	2015 BQ_{194}	—	January 17, 2015	Haleakala	Pan-STARRS 1	·	2.0 km	MPC · JPL
802196	2015 BP_{196}	—	January 17, 2015	Haleakala	Pan-STARRS 1	·	1.6 km	MPC · JPL
802197	2015 BS_{196}	—	January 17, 2015	Haleakala	Pan-STARRS 1	615	810 m	MPC · JPL
802198	2015 BU_{197}	—	January 17, 2015	Haleakala	Pan-STARRS 1	·	1.1 km	MPC · JPL
802199	2015 BF_{198}	—	May 31, 2006	Mount Lemmon	Mount Lemmon Survey	·	740 m	MPC · JPL
802200	2015 BA_{199}	—	January 17, 2015	Haleakala	Pan-STARRS 1	·	1.2 km	MPC · JPL

== 802201–802300 ==
back to top

Designation			Discovery			Properties		Ref
Permanent	Provisional	Named after	Date	Site	Discoverer(s)	Category	Diam.	Ref
802201	2015 BL_{199}	—	January 17, 2015	Haleakala	Pan-STARRS 1	·	1.3 km	MPC · JPL
802202	2015 BH_{201}	—	February 10, 2011	Mount Lemmon	Mount Lemmon Survey	·	1.0 km	MPC · JPL
802203	2015 BC_{206}	—	September 10, 2007	Mount Lemmon	Mount Lemmon Survey	·	490 m	MPC · JPL
802204	2015 BW_{213}	—	January 17, 2015	Mount Lemmon	Mount Lemmon Survey	·	1.2 km	MPC · JPL
802205	2015 BF_{215}	—	November 10, 2009	Mount Lemmon	Mount Lemmon Survey	·	1.2 km	MPC · JPL
802206	2015 BT_{216}	—	January 18, 2015	Haleakala	Pan-STARRS 1	·	1.4 km	MPC · JPL
802207	2015 BB_{217}	—	December 26, 2014	Haleakala	Pan-STARRS 1	·	2.1 km	MPC · JPL
802208	2015 BV_{217}	—	September 24, 2013	Kitt Peak	Spacewatch	·	1.5 km	MPC · JPL
802209	2015 BW_{218}	—	October 14, 2009	Mount Lemmon	Mount Lemmon Survey	·	1.3 km	MPC · JPL
802210	2015 BR_{222}	—	January 18, 2015	Mount Lemmon	Mount Lemmon Survey	·	2.4 km	MPC · JPL
802211	2015 BP_{225}	—	January 18, 2015	Mount Lemmon	Mount Lemmon Survey	·	1.3 km	MPC · JPL
802212	2015 BV_{228}	—	December 29, 2014	Haleakala	Pan-STARRS 1	·	1.7 km	MPC · JPL
802213	2015 BW_{228}	—	October 2, 2013	Mount Lemmon	Mount Lemmon Survey	EOS	1.3 km	MPC · JPL
802214	2015 BN_{231}	—	December 29, 2014	Haleakala	Pan-STARRS 1	·	1.3 km	MPC · JPL
802215	2015 BS_{233}	—	January 18, 2015	Haleakala	Pan-STARRS 1	·	1.9 km	MPC · JPL
802216	2015 BQ_{235}	—	January 18, 2015	Haleakala	Pan-STARRS 1	·	1.2 km	MPC · JPL
802217	2015 BY_{235}	—	January 18, 2015	Haleakala	Pan-STARRS 1	·	1.1 km	MPC · JPL
802218	2015 BK_{236}	—	March 10, 2011	Kitt Peak	Spacewatch	MRX	770 m	MPC · JPL
802219	2015 BC_{237}	—	January 18, 2015	Mount Lemmon	Mount Lemmon Survey	·	1.4 km	MPC · JPL
802220	2015 BC_{239}	—	January 18, 2015	Mount Lemmon	Mount Lemmon Survey	·	1.4 km	MPC · JPL
802221	2015 BX_{240}	—	January 18, 2015	Haleakala	Pan-STARRS 1	·	1.4 km	MPC · JPL
802222	2015 BJ_{244}	—	October 4, 2013	Mount Lemmon	Mount Lemmon Survey	·	1.5 km	MPC · JPL
802223	2015 BJ_{246}	—	February 20, 2006	Mount Lemmon	Mount Lemmon Survey	·	1.2 km	MPC · JPL
802224	2015 BX_{246}	—	January 18, 2015	Haleakala	Pan-STARRS 1	·	1.1 km	MPC · JPL
802225	2015 BW_{258}	—	January 18, 2015	Haleakala	Pan-STARRS 1	3:2	2.7 km	MPC · JPL
802226	2015 BO_{259}	—	October 3, 2013	Haleakala	Pan-STARRS 1	·	1.5 km	MPC · JPL
802227	2015 BQ_{259}	—	January 18, 2015	Haleakala	Pan-STARRS 1	·	430 m	MPC · JPL
802228	2015 BR_{261}	—	January 18, 2015	Mount Lemmon	Mount Lemmon Survey	·	1.4 km	MPC · JPL
802229	2015 BL_{262}	—	January 18, 2015	Haleakala	Pan-STARRS 1	·	2.9 km	MPC · JPL
802230	2015 BA_{263}	—	January 18, 2015	Haleakala	Pan-STARRS 1	THM	1.6 km	MPC · JPL
802231	2015 BX_{264}	—	January 18, 2015	Haleakala	Pan-STARRS 1	·	1.9 km	MPC · JPL
802232	2015 BP_{268}	—	November 28, 2014	Haleakala	Pan-STARRS 1	·	2.1 km	MPC · JPL
802233	2015 BU_{272}	—	November 24, 2014	Mount Lemmon	Mount Lemmon Survey	DOR	1.5 km	MPC · JPL
802234	2015 BW_{279}	—	October 16, 2009	Mount Lemmon	Mount Lemmon Survey	·	1.4 km	MPC · JPL
802235	2015 BR_{282}	—	January 19, 2015	Haleakala	Pan-STARRS 1	VER	1.6 km	MPC · JPL
802236	2015 BQ_{286}	—	December 2, 2014	Haleakala	Pan-STARRS 1	·	1.9 km	MPC · JPL
802237	2015 BX_{287}	—	January 19, 2015	Haleakala	Pan-STARRS 1	·	1.7 km	MPC · JPL
802238	2015 BZ_{291}	—	January 19, 2015	Haleakala	Pan-STARRS 1	·	2.0 km	MPC · JPL
802239	2015 BZ_{293}	—	January 19, 2015	Haleakala	Pan-STARRS 1	·	1.5 km	MPC · JPL
802240	2015 BY_{294}	—	January 19, 2015	Haleakala	Pan-STARRS 1	EUN	750 m	MPC · JPL
802241	2015 BV_{295}	—	January 19, 2015	Haleakala	Pan-STARRS 1	BRA	1.2 km	MPC · JPL
802242	2015 BH_{300}	—	March 2, 2008	Mount Lemmon	Mount Lemmon Survey	·	790 m	MPC · JPL
802243	2015 BN_{307}	—	January 20, 2015	Mount Lemmon	Mount Lemmon Survey	·	2.4 km	MPC · JPL
802244	2015 BU_{312}	—	January 16, 2015	Haleakala	Pan-STARRS 1	AGN	830 m	MPC · JPL
802245	2015 BS_{314}	—	January 16, 2015	Haleakala	Pan-STARRS 1	·	1.7 km	MPC · JPL
802246	2015 BR_{317}	—	January 17, 2015	Haleakala	Pan-STARRS 1	·	1.8 km	MPC · JPL
802247	2015 BT_{318}	—	January 17, 2015	Haleakala	Pan-STARRS 1	·	1.7 km	MPC · JPL
802248	2015 BV_{318}	—	January 17, 2015	Haleakala	Pan-STARRS 1	·	1.5 km	MPC · JPL
802249	2015 BC_{326}	—	January 17, 2015	Haleakala	Pan-STARRS 1	·	1.3 km	MPC · JPL
802250	2015 BS_{327}	—	November 17, 2007	Mount Lemmon	Mount Lemmon Survey	·	500 m	MPC · JPL
802251	2015 BR_{329}	—	January 17, 2015	Haleakala	Pan-STARRS 1	HOF	1.8 km	MPC · JPL
802252	2015 BF_{332}	—	January 17, 2015	Haleakala	Pan-STARRS 1	·	1.3 km	MPC · JPL
802253	2015 BM_{332}	—	January 17, 2015	Haleakala	Pan-STARRS 1	AGN	880 m	MPC · JPL
802254	2015 BU_{336}	—	January 17, 2015	Haleakala	Pan-STARRS 1	·	2.1 km	MPC · JPL
802255	2015 BA_{337}	—	January 17, 2015	Haleakala	Pan-STARRS 1	·	1.8 km	MPC · JPL
802256	2015 BO_{339}	—	January 17, 2015	Haleakala	Pan-STARRS 1	·	1.4 km	MPC · JPL
802257	2015 BO_{344}	—	November 1, 2013	Mount Lemmon	Mount Lemmon Survey	·	1.3 km	MPC · JPL
802258	2015 BX_{344}	—	January 17, 2015	Haleakala	Pan-STARRS 1	·	1.5 km	MPC · JPL
802259	2015 BV_{347}	—	January 18, 2015	Haleakala	Pan-STARRS 1	·	2.3 km	MPC · JPL
802260	2015 BV_{349}	—	January 18, 2015	Haleakala	Pan-STARRS 1	·	1.4 km	MPC · JPL
802261	2015 BV_{350}	—	January 18, 2015	Haleakala	Pan-STARRS 1	·	2.3 km	MPC · JPL
802262	2015 BA_{352}	—	January 18, 2015	Haleakala	Pan-STARRS 1	·	1.4 km	MPC · JPL
802263	2015 BG_{352}	—	January 18, 2015	Haleakala	Pan-STARRS 1	MRX	840 m	MPC · JPL
802264	2015 BO_{358}	—	November 17, 2009	Mount Lemmon	Mount Lemmon Survey	·	1.2 km	MPC · JPL
802265	2015 BP_{360}	—	January 20, 2015	Haleakala	Pan-STARRS 1	·	570 m	MPC · JPL
802266	2015 BH_{367}	—	October 5, 2013	Haleakala	Pan-STARRS 1	·	1.3 km	MPC · JPL
802267	2015 BM_{368}	—	December 29, 2014	Haleakala	Pan-STARRS 1	·	1.3 km	MPC · JPL
802268	2015 BK_{369}	—	December 21, 2014	Haleakala	Pan-STARRS 1	·	990 m	MPC · JPL
802269	2015 BX_{371}	—	January 20, 2015	Haleakala	Pan-STARRS 1	·	1.1 km	MPC · JPL
802270	2015 BH_{372}	—	January 20, 2015	Haleakala	Pan-STARRS 1	·	2.3 km	MPC · JPL
802271	2015 BS_{376}	—	October 12, 2013	Mount Lemmon	Mount Lemmon Survey	PAD	1.2 km	MPC · JPL
802272	2015 BM_{377}	—	December 29, 2014	Haleakala	Pan-STARRS 1	·	1.2 km	MPC · JPL
802273	2015 BQ_{377}	—	January 20, 2015	Haleakala	Pan-STARRS 1	·	1.2 km	MPC · JPL
802274	2015 BD_{383}	—	January 20, 2015	Haleakala	Pan-STARRS 1	·	1.6 km	MPC · JPL
802275	2015 BH_{383}	—	October 5, 2013	Haleakala	Pan-STARRS 1	·	1.3 km	MPC · JPL
802276	2015 BT_{384}	—	January 20, 2015	Haleakala	Pan-STARRS 1	KOR	890 m	MPC · JPL
802277	2015 BY_{385}	—	September 20, 2008	Mount Lemmon	Mount Lemmon Survey	·	1.4 km	MPC · JPL
802278	2015 BX_{396}	—	January 20, 2015	Haleakala	Pan-STARRS 1	·	1.2 km	MPC · JPL
802279	2015 BE_{401}	—	January 20, 2015	Haleakala	Pan-STARRS 1	EOS	1.4 km	MPC · JPL
802280	2015 BN_{401}	—	November 5, 2010	Mount Lemmon	Mount Lemmon Survey	·	560 m	MPC · JPL
802281	2015 BO_{406}	—	March 30, 2011	Mount Lemmon	Mount Lemmon Survey	·	1.3 km	MPC · JPL
802282	2015 BD_{421}	—	January 20, 2015	Haleakala	Pan-STARRS 1	·	880 m	MPC · JPL
802283	2015 BV_{424}	—	January 20, 2015	Haleakala	Pan-STARRS 1	·	1.6 km	MPC · JPL
802284	2015 BV_{427}	—	January 20, 2015	Haleakala	Pan-STARRS 1	·	1.8 km	MPC · JPL
802285	2015 BW_{428}	—	January 20, 2015	Haleakala	Pan-STARRS 1	KOR	1.0 km	MPC · JPL
802286	2015 BB_{432}	—	January 20, 2015	Haleakala	Pan-STARRS 1	·	1.2 km	MPC · JPL
802287	2015 BT_{432}	—	January 20, 2015	Haleakala	Pan-STARRS 1	·	1.9 km	MPC · JPL
802288	2015 BP_{438}	—	January 20, 2015	Haleakala	Pan-STARRS 1	·	2.3 km	MPC · JPL
802289	2015 BF_{448}	—	November 27, 2013	Haleakala	Pan-STARRS 1	·	2.3 km	MPC · JPL
802290	2015 BC_{449}	—	February 16, 2010	Mount Lemmon	Mount Lemmon Survey	·	1.5 km	MPC · JPL
802291	2015 BH_{458}	—	January 20, 2015	Haleakala	Pan-STARRS 1	EOS	1.1 km	MPC · JPL
802292	2015 BG_{460}	—	January 20, 2015	Haleakala	Pan-STARRS 1	KOR	1 km	MPC · JPL
802293	2015 BR_{462}	—	January 20, 2015	Haleakala	Pan-STARRS 1	·	1.4 km	MPC · JPL
802294	2015 BT_{462}	—	September 16, 2012	Kitt Peak	Spacewatch	·	2.0 km	MPC · JPL
802295	2015 BU_{462}	—	January 20, 2015	Haleakala	Pan-STARRS 1	·	2.1 km	MPC · JPL
802296	2015 BK_{466}	—	January 20, 2015	Haleakala	Pan-STARRS 1	·	2.0 km	MPC · JPL
802297	2015 BN_{470}	—	October 18, 2004	Kitt Peak	Deep Ecliptic Survey	·	480 m	MPC · JPL
802298	2015 BN_{472}	—	January 20, 2015	Haleakala	Pan-STARRS 1	EOS	1.4 km	MPC · JPL
802299	2015 BQ_{472}	—	November 17, 2009	Kitt Peak	Spacewatch	WIT	640 m	MPC · JPL
802300	2015 BS_{473}	—	October 25, 2013	Mount Lemmon	Mount Lemmon Survey	·	1.3 km	MPC · JPL

== 802301–802400 ==
back to top

Designation			Discovery			Properties		Ref
Permanent	Provisional	Named after	Date	Site	Discoverer(s)	Category	Diam.	Ref
802301	2015 BA_{475}	—	September 6, 2008	Mount Lemmon	Mount Lemmon Survey	·	1.2 km	MPC · JPL
802302	2015 BJ_{477}	—	September 7, 2008	Mount Lemmon	Mount Lemmon Survey	HOF	1.8 km	MPC · JPL
802303	2015 BO_{479}	—	January 20, 2015	Haleakala	Pan-STARRS 1	WIT	680 m	MPC · JPL
802304	2015 BV_{480}	—	January 20, 2015	Haleakala	Pan-STARRS 1	·	1.5 km	MPC · JPL
802305	2015 BW_{481}	—	January 20, 2015	Haleakala	Pan-STARRS 1	·	1.6 km	MPC · JPL
802306	2015 BY_{482}	—	January 20, 2015	Haleakala	Pan-STARRS 1	MRX	830 m	MPC · JPL
802307	2015 BP_{488}	—	January 20, 2015	Haleakala	Pan-STARRS 1	VER	1.9 km	MPC · JPL
802308	2015 BQ_{488}	—	October 3, 2013	Mount Lemmon	Mount Lemmon Survey	AGN	940 m	MPC · JPL
802309	2015 BX_{496}	—	November 9, 2013	Haleakala	Pan-STARRS 1	·	1.2 km	MPC · JPL
802310	2015 BM_{498}	—	January 20, 2015	Haleakala	Pan-STARRS 1	·	540 m	MPC · JPL
802311	2015 BP_{502}	—	January 20, 2015	Haleakala	Pan-STARRS 1	·	1.1 km	MPC · JPL
802312	2015 BK_{505}	—	January 20, 2015	Haleakala	Pan-STARRS 1	·	1.2 km	MPC · JPL
802313	2015 BL_{519}	—	January 23, 2015	Haleakala	Pan-STARRS 1	L4	5.8 km	MPC · JPL
802314	2015 BA_{520}	—	January 18, 2015	Haleakala	Pan-STARRS 1	H	390 m	MPC · JPL
802315	2015 BQ_{520}	—	August 30, 2011	Haleakala	Pan-STARRS 1	H	300 m	MPC · JPL
802316	2015 BS_{520}	—	January 23, 2015	Haleakala	Pan-STARRS 1	H	440 m	MPC · JPL
802317	2015 BV_{521}	—	January 28, 2015	Haleakala	Pan-STARRS 1	H	410 m	MPC · JPL
802318	2015 BZ_{528}	—	January 16, 2015	Haleakala	Pan-STARRS 1	·	1.6 km	MPC · JPL
802319	2015 BV_{530}	—	January 21, 2015	Haleakala	Pan-STARRS 1	·	1.4 km	MPC · JPL
802320	2015 BP_{532}	—	January 24, 2015	Haleakala	Pan-STARRS 1	·	1.5 km	MPC · JPL
802321	2015 BU_{540}	—	September 8, 2007	Mount Lemmon	Mount Lemmon Survey	·	2.1 km	MPC · JPL
802322	2015 BT_{543}	—	January 20, 2015	Haleakala	Pan-STARRS 1	AGN	950 m	MPC · JPL
802323	2015 BM_{548}	—	January 17, 2015	Haleakala	Pan-STARRS 1	AGN	810 m	MPC · JPL
802324	2015 BN_{549}	—	October 5, 2013	Haleakala	Pan-STARRS 1	AGN	830 m	MPC · JPL
802325	2015 BM_{552}	—	January 18, 2015	Haleakala	Pan-STARRS 1	BRA	1.0 km	MPC · JPL
802326	2015 BH_{553}	—	November 2, 2013	Mount Lemmon	Mount Lemmon Survey	·	1.2 km	MPC · JPL
802327	2015 BX_{560}	—	February 9, 2010	Kitt Peak	Spacewatch	EOS	1.2 km	MPC · JPL
802328	2015 BA_{565}	—	March 26, 2011	Mount Lemmon	Mount Lemmon Survey	·	1.5 km	MPC · JPL
802329	2015 BS_{568}	—	January 28, 2015	Haleakala	Pan-STARRS 1	TRE	2.3 km	MPC · JPL
802330	2015 BF_{569}	—	April 7, 2017	Mount Lemmon	Mount Lemmon Survey	·	2.6 km	MPC · JPL
802331	2015 BT_{569}	—	January 20, 2015	Haleakala	Pan-STARRS 1	·	1.8 km	MPC · JPL
802332	2015 BD_{570}	—	January 18, 2015	Haleakala	Pan-STARRS 1	·	1.5 km	MPC · JPL
802333	2015 BK_{571}	—	October 25, 2000	Socorro	LINEAR	·	500 m	MPC · JPL
802334	2015 BR_{571}	—	January 26, 2015	Haleakala	Pan-STARRS 1	EOS	1.4 km	MPC · JPL
802335	2015 BZ_{571}	—	January 20, 2015	Haleakala	Pan-STARRS 1	·	1.7 km	MPC · JPL
802336	2015 BB_{572}	—	January 16, 2015	Haleakala	Pan-STARRS 1	BRA	1.4 km	MPC · JPL
802337	2015 BE_{573}	—	January 17, 2015	Haleakala	Pan-STARRS 1	·	1.5 km	MPC · JPL
802338	2015 BD_{575}	—	January 27, 2015	Haleakala	Pan-STARRS 1	·	1.7 km	MPC · JPL
802339	2015 BK_{576}	—	January 16, 2015	Haleakala	Pan-STARRS 1	·	2.5 km	MPC · JPL
802340	2015 BO_{576}	—	February 6, 2016	Haleakala	Pan-STARRS 1	·	3.3 km	MPC · JPL
802341	2015 BY_{576}	—	January 18, 2015	Mount Lemmon	Mount Lemmon Survey	·	2.7 km	MPC · JPL
802342	2015 BG_{579}	—	January 20, 2015	Haleakala	Pan-STARRS 1	AGN	820 m	MPC · JPL
802343	2015 BU_{579}	—	January 29, 2015	Haleakala	Pan-STARRS 1	·	1.5 km	MPC · JPL
802344	2015 BY_{583}	—	November 6, 2015	ESA OGS	ESA OGS	L5	6.1 km	MPC · JPL
802345	2015 BR_{584}	—	January 20, 2015	Haleakala	Pan-STARRS 1	·	1.2 km	MPC · JPL
802346	2015 BL_{586}	—	January 20, 2015	Mount Lemmon	Mount Lemmon Survey	·	1.5 km	MPC · JPL
802347	2015 BT_{586}	—	January 18, 2015	Mount Lemmon	Mount Lemmon Survey	·	2.6 km	MPC · JPL
802348	2015 BF_{587}	—	February 14, 2016	Haleakala	Pan-STARRS 1	·	3.0 km	MPC · JPL
802349	2015 BP_{587}	—	January 17, 2015	Haleakala	Pan-STARRS 1	EOS	1.4 km	MPC · JPL
802350	2015 BO_{591}	—	January 17, 2015	Mount Lemmon	Mount Lemmon Survey	GEF	910 m	MPC · JPL
802351	2015 BE_{594}	—	January 21, 2015	Haleakala	Pan-STARRS 1	·	1.9 km	MPC · JPL
802352	2015 BN_{594}	—	January 19, 2015	Mount Lemmon	Mount Lemmon Survey	·	2.1 km	MPC · JPL
802353	2015 BS_{594}	—	January 28, 2015	Haleakala	Pan-STARRS 1	VER	2.0 km	MPC · JPL
802354	2015 BN_{595}	—	January 20, 2015	Haleakala	Pan-STARRS 1	·	1.1 km	MPC · JPL
802355	2015 BW_{595}	—	January 19, 2015	Mount Lemmon	Mount Lemmon Survey	·	1.1 km	MPC · JPL
802356	2015 BX_{595}	—	January 22, 2015	Haleakala	Pan-STARRS 1	·	1.1 km	MPC · JPL
802357	2015 BY_{595}	—	January 17, 2015	Haleakala	Pan-STARRS 1	·	1.5 km	MPC · JPL
802358	2015 BL_{596}	—	January 26, 2015	Haleakala	Pan-STARRS 1	·	1.9 km	MPC · JPL
802359	2015 BP_{597}	—	January 29, 2015	Haleakala	Pan-STARRS 1	·	1.2 km	MPC · JPL
802360	2015 BD_{598}	—	January 17, 2015	Haleakala	Pan-STARRS 1	·	1.4 km	MPC · JPL
802361	2015 BS_{599}	—	January 18, 2015	Haleakala	Pan-STARRS 1	·	1.3 km	MPC · JPL
802362	2015 BP_{601}	—	January 20, 2015	Haleakala	Pan-STARRS 1	·	1.6 km	MPC · JPL
802363	2015 BH_{602}	—	January 28, 2015	Haleakala	Pan-STARRS 1	BRA	930 m	MPC · JPL
802364	2015 BQ_{603}	—	January 22, 2015	Haleakala	Pan-STARRS 1	·	1.4 km	MPC · JPL
802365	2015 BE_{605}	—	January 28, 2015	Haleakala	Pan-STARRS 1	·	2.5 km	MPC · JPL
802366	2015 BB_{607}	—	January 22, 2015	Haleakala	Pan-STARRS 1	·	1.3 km	MPC · JPL
802367	2015 BF_{607}	—	January 23, 2015	Haleakala	Pan-STARRS 1	·	1.1 km	MPC · JPL
802368	2015 BL_{607}	—	January 20, 2015	Mount Lemmon	Mount Lemmon Survey	·	1.5 km	MPC · JPL
802369	2015 BG_{608}	—	January 20, 2015	Haleakala	Pan-STARRS 1	EOS	1.1 km	MPC · JPL
802370	2015 BL_{609}	—	January 20, 2015	Haleakala	Pan-STARRS 1	·	890 m	MPC · JPL
802371	2015 BB_{610}	—	January 29, 2015	Haleakala	Pan-STARRS 1	·	1.7 km	MPC · JPL
802372	2015 BF_{613}	—	January 23, 2015	Haleakala	Pan-STARRS 1	·	1.5 km	MPC · JPL
802373	2015 BM_{613}	—	January 16, 2015	Haleakala	Pan-STARRS 1	MRX	830 m	MPC · JPL
802374	2015 BN_{613}	—	January 20, 2015	Haleakala	Pan-STARRS 1	·	1.2 km	MPC · JPL
802375	2015 BT_{613}	—	January 23, 2015	Haleakala	Pan-STARRS 1	·	1.7 km	MPC · JPL
802376	2015 BG_{614}	—	January 19, 2015	Haleakala	Pan-STARRS 1	·	1.5 km	MPC · JPL
802377	2015 BM_{614}	—	January 22, 2015	Haleakala	Pan-STARRS 1	L4	7.5 km	MPC · JPL
802378	2015 BR_{615}	—	January 28, 2015	Haleakala	Pan-STARRS 1	·	1.9 km	MPC · JPL
802379	2015 BU_{617}	—	January 21, 2015	Haleakala	Pan-STARRS 1	·	1.1 km	MPC · JPL
802380	2015 BS_{618}	—	January 20, 2015	Haleakala	Pan-STARRS 1	·	560 m	MPC · JPL
802381	2015 BP_{619}	—	January 28, 2015	Haleakala	Pan-STARRS 1	·	1.5 km	MPC · JPL
802382	2015 BX_{619}	—	January 21, 2015	Haleakala	Pan-STARRS 1	·	1.7 km	MPC · JPL
802383	2015 CM_{6}	—	November 5, 2007	Mount Lemmon	Mount Lemmon Survey	·	450 m	MPC · JPL
802384	2015 CE_{7}	—	January 20, 2015	Haleakala	Pan-STARRS 1	·	1.4 km	MPC · JPL
802385	2015 CC_{8}	—	January 20, 2015	Haleakala	Pan-STARRS 1	·	1.7 km	MPC · JPL
802386	2015 CG_{8}	—	March 2, 2006	Kitt Peak	Spacewatch	·	1.3 km	MPC · JPL
802387	2015 CB_{14}	—	January 18, 2015	ESA OGS	ESA OGS	H	440 m	MPC · JPL
802388	2015 CL_{19}	—	March 4, 2005	Mount Lemmon	Mount Lemmon Survey	·	530 m	MPC · JPL
802389	2015 CB_{29}	—	November 10, 2013	Mount Lemmon	Mount Lemmon Survey	·	1.5 km	MPC · JPL
802390	2015 CE_{35}	—	January 27, 2015	Haleakala	Pan-STARRS 1	·	1.4 km	MPC · JPL
802391	2015 CS_{42}	—	February 2, 2005	Kitt Peak	Spacewatch	·	470 m	MPC · JPL
802392	2015 CB_{43}	—	February 15, 2015	Haleakala	Pan-STARRS 1	·	2.4 km	MPC · JPL
802393	2015 CF_{52}	—	January 20, 2015	Haleakala	Pan-STARRS 1	·	970 m	MPC · JPL
802394	2015 CJ_{53}	—	January 25, 2015	Haleakala	Pan-STARRS 1	·	1.9 km	MPC · JPL
802395	2015 CX_{67}	—	January 20, 2015	Haleakala	Pan-STARRS 1	·	1.4 km	MPC · JPL
802396	2015 CH_{68}	—	February 10, 2015	Mount Lemmon	Mount Lemmon Survey	AST	1.4 km	MPC · JPL
802397	2015 CB_{71}	—	February 11, 2015	Haleakala	Pan-STARRS 1	AGN	890 m	MPC · JPL
802398	2015 CR_{71}	—	February 13, 2015	Haleakala	Pan-STARRS 1	·	1.5 km	MPC · JPL
802399	2015 CE_{74}	—	February 10, 2015	Mount Lemmon	Mount Lemmon Survey	·	1.8 km	MPC · JPL
802400	2015 CG_{74}	—	February 8, 2015	Mount Lemmon	Mount Lemmon Survey	EOS	1.3 km	MPC · JPL

== 802401–802500 ==
back to top

Designation			Discovery			Properties		Ref
Permanent	Provisional	Named after	Date	Site	Discoverer(s)	Category	Diam.	Ref
802401	2015 CZ_{75}	—	January 17, 2015	Haleakala	Pan-STARRS 1	AGN	830 m	MPC · JPL
802402	2015 CA_{78}	—	January 24, 2015	Haleakala	Pan-STARRS 1	·	1.4 km	MPC · JPL
802403	2015 CH_{78}	—	January 22, 2015	Haleakala	Pan-STARRS 1	·	1.3 km	MPC · JPL
802404	2015 CN_{78}	—	February 10, 2015	Mount Lemmon	Mount Lemmon Survey	KOR	1.1 km	MPC · JPL
802405	2015 CH_{80}	—	February 15, 2015	Haleakala	Pan-STARRS 1	·	1.2 km	MPC · JPL
802406	2015 CB_{82}	—	February 15, 2015	Haleakala	Pan-STARRS 1	AGN	910 m	MPC · JPL
802407	2015 CE_{82}	—	February 12, 2015	Haleakala	Pan-STARRS 1	·	1.3 km	MPC · JPL
802408	2015 CF_{82}	—	February 8, 2015	Mount Lemmon	Mount Lemmon Survey	·	990 m	MPC · JPL
802409	2015 DV_{3}	—	March 13, 2011	Kitt Peak	Spacewatch	MRX	730 m	MPC · JPL
802410	2015 DE_{10}	—	January 14, 2015	Haleakala	Pan-STARRS 1	·	2.6 km	MPC · JPL
802411	2015 DN_{12}	—	January 22, 2015	Haleakala	Pan-STARRS 1	KOR	890 m	MPC · JPL
802412	2015 DQ_{13}	—	January 17, 2015	Haleakala	Pan-STARRS 1	·	1.5 km	MPC · JPL
802413	2015 DO_{14}	—	January 16, 2015	Haleakala	Pan-STARRS 1	AGN	840 m	MPC · JPL
802414	2015 DE_{16}	—	January 17, 2015	Haleakala	Pan-STARRS 1	·	1.5 km	MPC · JPL
802415	2015 DM_{19}	—	October 24, 2009	Kitt Peak	Spacewatch	(5)	910 m	MPC · JPL
802416	2015 DB_{20}	—	February 16, 2015	Haleakala	Pan-STARRS 1	·	1.6 km	MPC · JPL
802417	2015 DV_{24}	—	February 16, 2015	Haleakala	Pan-STARRS 1	EOS	1.4 km	MPC · JPL
802418	2015 DW_{26}	—	September 24, 2008	Mount Lemmon	Mount Lemmon Survey	·	1.5 km	MPC · JPL
802419	2015 DR_{27}	—	September 28, 2013	Mount Lemmon	Mount Lemmon Survey	·	1.1 km	MPC · JPL
802420	2015 DF_{30}	—	January 27, 2015	Haleakala	Pan-STARRS 1	·	1.9 km	MPC · JPL
802421	2015 DX_{30}	—	January 29, 2015	Haleakala	Pan-STARRS 1	·	1.4 km	MPC · JPL
802422	2015 DS_{43}	—	February 16, 2015	Haleakala	Pan-STARRS 1	·	1.5 km	MPC · JPL
802423	2015 DX_{43}	—	January 27, 2015	Haleakala	Pan-STARRS 1	·	1.5 km	MPC · JPL
802424	2015 DA_{48}	—	January 15, 2005	Kitt Peak	Spacewatch	·	630 m	MPC · JPL
802425	2015 DE_{49}	—	February 10, 2015	Kitt Peak	Spacewatch	·	1.3 km	MPC · JPL
802426	2015 DM_{52}	—	February 16, 2015	Haleakala	Pan-STARRS 1	·	2.0 km	MPC · JPL
802427	2015 DG_{54}	—	September 16, 2009	Mount Lemmon	Mount Lemmon Survey	·	1.7 km	MPC · JPL
802428	2015 DB_{58}	—	January 20, 2015	Haleakala	Pan-STARRS 1	·	1.6 km	MPC · JPL
802429	2015 DM_{58}	—	January 22, 2015	Haleakala	Pan-STARRS 1	·	1.1 km	MPC · JPL
802430	2015 DF_{72}	—	January 22, 2015	Haleakala	Pan-STARRS 1	·	1.3 km	MPC · JPL
802431	2015 DD_{77}	—	January 20, 2015	Haleakala	Pan-STARRS 1	·	1.2 km	MPC · JPL
802432	2015 DZ_{77}	—	January 22, 2015	Haleakala	Pan-STARRS 1	·	1.6 km	MPC · JPL
802433	2015 DH_{78}	—	January 22, 2015	Haleakala	Pan-STARRS 1	NEM	1.5 km	MPC · JPL
802434	2015 DV_{79}	—	January 27, 2015	Haleakala	Pan-STARRS 1	·	1.6 km	MPC · JPL
802435	2015 DY_{80}	—	January 29, 2015	Haleakala	Pan-STARRS 1	·	1.5 km	MPC · JPL
802436	2015 DZ_{81}	—	April 10, 2010	Mount Lemmon	Mount Lemmon Survey	·	1.6 km	MPC · JPL
802437	2015 DP_{82}	—	January 29, 2015	Haleakala	Pan-STARRS 1	KOR	1.1 km	MPC · JPL
802438	2015 DW_{86}	—	February 16, 2010	Mount Lemmon	Mount Lemmon Survey	·	1.3 km	MPC · JPL
802439	2015 DO_{87}	—	November 26, 2014	Mauna Kea	R. J. Wainscoat, M. Micheli	·	1.5 km	MPC · JPL
802440	2015 DC_{90}	—	August 17, 2012	Haleakala	Pan-STARRS 1	KOR	990 m	MPC · JPL
802441	2015 DD_{90}	—	January 20, 2009	Kitt Peak	Spacewatch	·	2.1 km	MPC · JPL
802442	2015 DT_{90}	—	January 16, 2015	Haleakala	Pan-STARRS 1	·	1.5 km	MPC · JPL
802443	2015 DN_{94}	—	May 24, 2011	Mount Lemmon	Mount Lemmon Survey	·	1.5 km	MPC · JPL
802444	2015 DA_{100}	—	April 1, 2008	Mount Lemmon	Mount Lemmon Survey	·	1.0 km	MPC · JPL
802445	2015 DM_{100}	—	January 20, 2015	Haleakala	Pan-STARRS 1	HOF	2.0 km	MPC · JPL
802446	2015 DS_{100}	—	January 17, 2015	Haleakala	Pan-STARRS 1	·	2.4 km	MPC · JPL
802447	2015 DL_{106}	—	February 25, 2011	Mount Lemmon	Mount Lemmon Survey	·	1 km	MPC · JPL
802448	2015 DM_{106}	—	January 17, 2015	Haleakala	Pan-STARRS 1	·	1.5 km	MPC · JPL
802449	2015 DA_{111}	—	October 24, 2013	Mount Lemmon	Mount Lemmon Survey	·	1.8 km	MPC · JPL
802450	2015 DY_{111}	—	November 23, 2009	Kitt Peak	Spacewatch	·	1.7 km	MPC · JPL
802451	2015 DA_{114}	—	February 27, 2006	Kitt Peak	Spacewatch	GEF	850 m	MPC · JPL
802452	2015 DV_{115}	—	February 9, 2008	Kitt Peak	Spacewatch	PHO	800 m	MPC · JPL
802453	2015 DP_{119}	—	September 23, 2008	Kitt Peak	Spacewatch	·	1.8 km	MPC · JPL
802454	2015 DJ_{121}	—	October 6, 2012	Haleakala	Pan-STARRS 1	·	1.8 km	MPC · JPL
802455	2015 DU_{122}	—	February 17, 2015	Haleakala	Pan-STARRS 1	EUN	610 m	MPC · JPL
802456	2015 DC_{123}	—	January 28, 2015	Haleakala	Pan-STARRS 1	·	1.5 km	MPC · JPL
802457	2015 DH_{123}	—	January 28, 2015	Haleakala	Pan-STARRS 1	·	1.4 km	MPC · JPL
802458	2015 DT_{124}	—	January 28, 2015	Haleakala	Pan-STARRS 1	KON	1.6 km	MPC · JPL
802459	2015 DE_{125}	—	February 17, 2015	Haleakala	Pan-STARRS 1	·	1.6 km	MPC · JPL
802460	2015 DD_{128}	—	February 17, 2015	Haleakala	Pan-STARRS 1	·	1.4 km	MPC · JPL
802461	2015 DU_{130}	—	December 29, 2014	Haleakala	Pan-STARRS 1	BRA	1.1 km	MPC · JPL
802462	2015 DO_{131}	—	January 13, 2002	Socorro	LINEAR	·	1.1 km	MPC · JPL
802463	2015 DP_{131}	—	October 31, 2013	Kitt Peak	Spacewatch	BRA	1.2 km	MPC · JPL
802464	2015 DB_{133}	—	February 17, 2015	Haleakala	Pan-STARRS 1	·	1.4 km	MPC · JPL
802465	2015 DL_{164}	—	February 18, 2015	Haleakala	Pan-STARRS 1	KOR	1.1 km	MPC · JPL
802466	2015 DG_{166}	—	February 18, 2015	Haleakala	Pan-STARRS 1	·	550 m	MPC · JPL
802467	2015 DJ_{170}	—	February 19, 2015	Haleakala	Pan-STARRS 1	·	1.8 km	MPC · JPL
802468	2015 DG_{178}	—	February 20, 2015	Mount Lemmon	Mount Lemmon Survey	·	1.5 km	MPC · JPL
802469	2015 DN_{179}	—	January 20, 2015	Haleakala	Pan-STARRS 1	·	2.3 km	MPC · JPL
802470	2015 DV_{182}	—	February 20, 2015	Haleakala	Pan-STARRS 1	EOS	1.4 km	MPC · JPL
802471	2015 DZ_{183}	—	December 21, 2008	Mount Lemmon	Mount Lemmon Survey	·	2.1 km	MPC · JPL
802472	2015 DA_{184}	—	May 21, 2011	Haleakala	Pan-STARRS 1	·	1.5 km	MPC · JPL
802473	2015 DQ_{185}	—	November 9, 2013	Kitt Peak	Spacewatch	·	1.4 km	MPC · JPL
802474	2015 DC_{190}	—	February 20, 2015	Haleakala	Pan-STARRS 1	·	1.6 km	MPC · JPL
802475	2015 DD_{191}	—	February 20, 2015	Haleakala	Pan-STARRS 1	URS	2.2 km	MPC · JPL
802476	2015 DJ_{192}	—	January 27, 2015	Haleakala	Pan-STARRS 1	EOS	1.3 km	MPC · JPL
802477	2015 DX_{194}	—	January 27, 2015	Haleakala	Pan-STARRS 1	·	1.5 km	MPC · JPL
802478	2015 DE_{197}	—	January 16, 2015	Haleakala	Pan-STARRS 1	615	1.2 km	MPC · JPL
802479	2015 DS_{199}	—	January 23, 2015	Haleakala	Pan-STARRS 1	·	420 m	MPC · JPL
802480	2015 DT_{199}	—	February 25, 2015	Haleakala	Pan-STARRS 1	H	410 m	MPC · JPL
802481	2015 DV_{206}	—	September 27, 2003	Kitt Peak	Spacewatch	H	350 m	MPC · JPL
802482	2015 DQ_{215}	—	January 20, 2015	Haleakala	Pan-STARRS 1	H	390 m	MPC · JPL
802483	2015 DV_{226}	—	February 16, 2015	Haleakala	Pan-STARRS 1	·	1.7 km	MPC · JPL
802484	2015 DE_{228}	—	February 26, 2015	Mount Lemmon	Mount Lemmon Survey	·	1.6 km	MPC · JPL
802485	2015 DJ_{230}	—	January 16, 2015	Haleakala	Pan-STARRS 1	·	2.2 km	MPC · JPL
802486	2015 DH_{232}	—	November 27, 2013	Haleakala	Pan-STARRS 1	BRA	1.0 km	MPC · JPL
802487	2015 DZ_{234}	—	February 19, 2015	Haleakala	Pan-STARRS 1	·	1 km	MPC · JPL
802488	2015 DY_{237}	—	October 10, 2012	Mount Lemmon	Mount Lemmon Survey	EOS	1.3 km	MPC · JPL
802489	2015 DB_{238}	—	February 16, 2015	Haleakala	Pan-STARRS 1	·	2.0 km	MPC · JPL
802490	2015 DE_{239}	—	August 26, 2012	Haleakala	Pan-STARRS 1	KOR	1.0 km	MPC · JPL
802491	2015 DW_{239}	—	January 17, 2015	Haleakala	Pan-STARRS 1	·	1.7 km	MPC · JPL
802492	2015 DT_{240}	—	February 17, 2015	Haleakala	Pan-STARRS 1	·	1.4 km	MPC · JPL
802493	2015 DD_{242}	—	February 19, 2015	Haleakala	Pan-STARRS 1	·	1.2 km	MPC · JPL
802494	2015 DR_{245}	—	February 24, 2015	Haleakala	Pan-STARRS 1	·	1.4 km	MPC · JPL
802495	2015 DH_{246}	—	February 24, 2015	Haleakala	Pan-STARRS 1	·	2.2 km	MPC · JPL
802496	2015 DQ_{251}	—	February 23, 2015	Haleakala	Pan-STARRS 1	·	1.7 km	MPC · JPL
802497	2015 DR_{252}	—	February 24, 2015	Haleakala	Pan-STARRS 1	·	1.6 km	MPC · JPL
802498	2015 DG_{253}	—	February 16, 2015	Haleakala	Pan-STARRS 1	·	1.4 km	MPC · JPL
802499	2015 DH_{253}	—	February 18, 2015	Mount Lemmon	Mount Lemmon Survey	·	2.0 km	MPC · JPL
802500	2015 DP_{255}	—	February 27, 2015	Haleakala	Pan-STARRS 1	PHO	810 m	MPC · JPL

== 802501–802600 ==
back to top

Designation			Discovery			Properties		Ref
Permanent	Provisional	Named after	Date	Site	Discoverer(s)	Category	Diam.	Ref
802501	2015 DD_{256}	—	December 23, 2017	Haleakala	Pan-STARRS 1	·	690 m	MPC · JPL
802502	2015 DZ_{256}	—	March 30, 2016	Cerro Paranal	Gaia Ground Based Optical Tracking	·	2.7 km	MPC · JPL
802503	2015 DZ_{257}	—	August 22, 2017	XuYi	PMO NEO Survey Program	BRA	1.4 km	MPC · JPL
802504	2015 DO_{258}	—	July 26, 2017	Haleakala	Pan-STARRS 1	·	1.4 km	MPC · JPL
802505	2015 DA_{259}	—	February 16, 2015	Haleakala	Pan-STARRS 1	·	1.9 km	MPC · JPL
802506	2015 DU_{259}	—	March 7, 2016	Haleakala	Pan-STARRS 1	·	1.7 km	MPC · JPL
802507	2015 DC_{260}	—	February 25, 2015	Haleakala	Pan-STARRS 1	·	1.4 km	MPC · JPL
802508	2015 DF_{261}	—	February 11, 2016	Haleakala	Pan-STARRS 1	·	2.1 km	MPC · JPL
802509	2015 DF_{262}	—	February 27, 2015	Haleakala	Pan-STARRS 1	·	1.8 km	MPC · JPL
802510	2015 DG_{265}	—	February 16, 2015	Haleakala	Pan-STARRS 1	·	1.9 km	MPC · JPL
802511	2015 DL_{267}	—	February 16, 2015	Haleakala	Pan-STARRS 1	·	1.6 km	MPC · JPL
802512	2015 DM_{267}	—	February 16, 2015	Haleakala	Pan-STARRS 1	HOF	1.8 km	MPC · JPL
802513	2015 DR_{267}	—	February 17, 2015	Haleakala	Pan-STARRS 1	GEF	830 m	MPC · JPL
802514	2015 DG_{268}	—	February 18, 2015	Haleakala	Pan-STARRS 1	·	1.5 km	MPC · JPL
802515	2015 DX_{268}	—	February 18, 2015	Haleakala	Pan-STARRS 1	BRA	1.1 km	MPC · JPL
802516	2015 DG_{269}	—	February 19, 2015	Haleakala	Pan-STARRS 1	·	1.5 km	MPC · JPL
802517	2015 DH_{269}	—	February 24, 2015	Haleakala	Pan-STARRS 1	·	1.5 km	MPC · JPL
802518	2015 DP_{269}	—	February 23, 2015	Haleakala	Pan-STARRS 1	·	1.3 km	MPC · JPL
802519	2015 DK_{272}	—	February 17, 2015	Haleakala	Pan-STARRS 1	·	760 m	MPC · JPL
802520	2015 DX_{272}	—	February 16, 2015	Haleakala	Pan-STARRS 1	·	670 m	MPC · JPL
802521	2015 DK_{273}	—	February 23, 2015	Haleakala	Pan-STARRS 1	·	1.3 km	MPC · JPL
802522	2015 DO_{273}	—	February 17, 2015	Haleakala	Pan-STARRS 1	EOS	1.6 km	MPC · JPL
802523	2015 DP_{273}	—	February 20, 2015	Haleakala	Pan-STARRS 1	·	2.0 km	MPC · JPL
802524	2015 DD_{274}	—	February 16, 2015	Haleakala	Pan-STARRS 1	·	850 m	MPC · JPL
802525	2015 DZ_{274}	—	February 18, 2015	Haleakala	Pan-STARRS 1	·	1.8 km	MPC · JPL
802526	2015 DW_{279}	—	February 18, 2015	Mount Lemmon	Mount Lemmon Survey	EOS	1.2 km	MPC · JPL
802527	2015 DZ_{280}	—	February 18, 2015	Haleakala	Pan-STARRS 1	·	1.9 km	MPC · JPL
802528	2015 DX_{282}	—	February 20, 2015	Haleakala	Pan-STARRS 1	·	730 m	MPC · JPL
802529	2015 DD_{283}	—	January 19, 2015	Haleakala	Pan-STARRS 1	·	1.9 km	MPC · JPL
802530	2015 DE_{283}	—	January 27, 2015	Haleakala	Pan-STARRS 1	·	1.4 km	MPC · JPL
802531	2015 DH_{283}	—	February 23, 2015	Haleakala	Pan-STARRS 1	·	860 m	MPC · JPL
802532	2015 DN_{283}	—	January 28, 2015	Haleakala	Pan-STARRS 1	·	2.4 km	MPC · JPL
802533	2015 DY_{284}	—	January 29, 2015	Haleakala	Pan-STARRS 1	·	2.0 km	MPC · JPL
802534	2015 DG_{286}	—	February 17, 2015	Haleakala	Pan-STARRS 1	EOS	1.3 km	MPC · JPL
802535	2015 DY_{286}	—	February 18, 2015	Haleakala	Pan-STARRS 1	·	1.5 km	MPC · JPL
802536	2015 DP_{287}	—	February 17, 2015	Haleakala	Pan-STARRS 1	·	1.7 km	MPC · JPL
802537	2015 DY_{287}	—	February 18, 2015	Kitt Peak	Research and Education Collaborative Occultation Network	L4	5.7 km	MPC · JPL
802538	2015 DB_{288}	—	December 18, 2014	Haleakala	Pan-STARRS 1	·	1.6 km	MPC · JPL
802539	2015 DU_{289}	—	February 16, 2015	Haleakala	Pan-STARRS 1	·	1.9 km	MPC · JPL
802540	2015 DB_{290}	—	February 23, 2015	Haleakala	Pan-STARRS 1	·	1.8 km	MPC · JPL
802541	2015 DZ_{291}	—	January 21, 2015	Haleakala	Pan-STARRS 1	·	1.4 km	MPC · JPL
802542	2015 DS_{292}	—	January 26, 2015	Haleakala	Pan-STARRS 1	·	1.3 km	MPC · JPL
802543	2015 DK_{293}	—	February 27, 2015	Haleakala	Pan-STARRS 1	·	1.1 km	MPC · JPL
802544	2015 DU_{293}	—	September 13, 2007	Mount Lemmon	Mount Lemmon Survey	·	1.6 km	MPC · JPL
802545	2015 DW_{293}	—	February 16, 2015	Haleakala	Pan-STARRS 1	KOR	1.1 km	MPC · JPL
802546	2015 DA_{294}	—	February 18, 2015	Kitt Peak	Spacewatch	·	1.5 km	MPC · JPL
802547	2015 DQ_{294}	—	February 18, 2015	Mount Lemmon	Mount Lemmon Survey	EOS	1.3 km	MPC · JPL
802548	2015 DX_{294}	—	January 19, 2015	Haleakala	Pan-STARRS 1	·	1.6 km	MPC · JPL
802549	2015 DK_{295}	—	February 16, 2015	Haleakala	Pan-STARRS 1	·	1.3 km	MPC · JPL
802550	2015 DO_{295}	—	February 24, 2015	Haleakala	Pan-STARRS 1	·	830 m	MPC · JPL
802551	2015 DQ_{295}	—	February 23, 2015	Haleakala	Pan-STARRS 1	·	2.0 km	MPC · JPL
802552	2015 DC_{296}	—	February 20, 2015	Haleakala	Pan-STARRS 1	·	1.4 km	MPC · JPL
802553	2015 DE_{297}	—	February 18, 2015	Kitt Peak	Research and Education Collaborative Occultation Network	BRA	920 m	MPC · JPL
802554	2015 DO_{298}	—	February 23, 2015	Haleakala	Pan-STARRS 1	·	2.2 km	MPC · JPL
802555	2015 DM_{301}	—	February 23, 2015	Haleakala	Pan-STARRS 1	·	1.9 km	MPC · JPL
802556	2015 DW_{301}	—	January 28, 2015	Haleakala	Pan-STARRS 1	·	1.4 km	MPC · JPL
802557	2015 DF_{302}	—	January 28, 2015	Haleakala	Pan-STARRS 1	·	1.5 km	MPC · JPL
802558	2015 DS_{303}	—	January 22, 2015	Haleakala	Pan-STARRS 1	BRA	1.1 km	MPC · JPL
802559	2015 DS_{304}	—	November 26, 2013	Haleakala	Pan-STARRS 1	·	1.5 km	MPC · JPL
802560	2015 DE_{305}	—	February 16, 2015	Haleakala	Pan-STARRS 1	·	2.1 km	MPC · JPL
802561	2015 DM_{310}	—	February 23, 2015	Haleakala	Pan-STARRS 1	EOS	1.2 km	MPC · JPL
802562	2015 DO_{310}	—	February 20, 2015	Haleakala	Pan-STARRS 1	·	1.8 km	MPC · JPL
802563	2015 DQ_{310}	—	February 20, 2015	Haleakala	Pan-STARRS 1	·	2.0 km	MPC · JPL
802564	2015 DT_{310}	—	February 17, 2015	Haleakala	Pan-STARRS 1	NAE	1.8 km	MPC · JPL
802565	2015 DZ_{310}	—	February 16, 2015	Haleakala	Pan-STARRS 1	AGN	900 m	MPC · JPL
802566	2015 DU_{311}	—	February 24, 2015	Haleakala	Pan-STARRS 1	·	1.3 km	MPC · JPL
802567	2015 DS_{312}	—	January 22, 2015	Haleakala	Pan-STARRS 1	AGN	820 m	MPC · JPL
802568	2015 DT_{312}	—	January 28, 2015	Haleakala	Pan-STARRS 1	·	1.7 km	MPC · JPL
802569	2015 DU_{312}	—	February 16, 2015	Haleakala	Pan-STARRS 1	·	800 m	MPC · JPL
802570	2015 DR_{319}	—	February 16, 2015	Haleakala	Pan-STARRS 1	KOR	1.0 km	MPC · JPL
802571	2015 DG_{364}	—	February 20, 2015	Haleakala	Pan-STARRS 1	·	1.9 km	MPC · JPL
802572	2015 EE	—	February 8, 2008	Mount Lemmon	Mount Lemmon Survey	·	770 m	MPC · JPL
802573	2015 EY_{6}	—	November 26, 2014	Haleakala	Pan-STARRS 1	H	470 m	MPC · JPL
802574	2015 EV_{18}	—	January 25, 2015	Haleakala	Pan-STARRS 1	·	1.2 km	MPC · JPL
802575	2015 EQ_{21}	—	February 15, 2015	Haleakala	Pan-STARRS 1	·	1.3 km	MPC · JPL
802576	2015 EB_{28}	—	January 21, 2015	Haleakala	Pan-STARRS 1	·	1.3 km	MPC · JPL
802577	2015 EQ_{32}	—	March 21, 2010	Mount Lemmon	Mount Lemmon Survey	EOS	1.2 km	MPC · JPL
802578	2015 EB_{41}	—	December 2, 2008	Kitt Peak	Spacewatch	·	1.6 km	MPC · JPL
802579	2015 EQ_{43}	—	January 8, 2010	Mount Lemmon	Mount Lemmon Survey	H	340 m	MPC · JPL
802580	2015 ER_{43}	—	March 14, 2015	Haleakala	Pan-STARRS 1	MRX	850 m	MPC · JPL
802581	2015 EJ_{46}	—	October 6, 2008	Mount Lemmon	Mount Lemmon Survey	·	1.3 km	MPC · JPL
802582	2015 EF_{47}	—	February 10, 2015	Mount Lemmon	Mount Lemmon Survey	·	1.8 km	MPC · JPL
802583	2015 EN_{47}	—	January 23, 2015	Haleakala	Pan-STARRS 1	·	1.3 km	MPC · JPL
802584	2015 ES_{49}	—	April 1, 2011	Mount Lemmon	Mount Lemmon Survey	·	920 m	MPC · JPL
802585	2015 EK_{68}	—	February 15, 2015	Haleakala	Pan-STARRS 1	·	830 m	MPC · JPL
802586	2015 EA_{69}	—	November 4, 2005	Mount Lemmon	Mount Lemmon Survey	3:2 · SHU	3.5 km	MPC · JPL
802587	2015 EP_{70}	—	March 29, 2012	Kitt Peak	Spacewatch	·	540 m	MPC · JPL
802588	2015 EE_{71}	—	March 14, 2015	Haleakala	Pan-STARRS 1	·	1.6 km	MPC · JPL
802589	2015 EE_{75}	—	March 9, 2015	Mount Lemmon	Mount Lemmon Survey	·	1.4 km	MPC · JPL
802590	2015 EM_{75}	—	January 16, 2015	Haleakala	Pan-STARRS 1	·	1.5 km	MPC · JPL
802591	2015 ES_{75}	—	March 15, 2015	Haleakala	Pan-STARRS 1	·	930 m	MPC · JPL
802592	2015 EC_{76}	—	March 15, 2015	Haleakala	Pan-STARRS 1	·	2.1 km	MPC · JPL
802593	2015 EC_{77}	—	March 11, 2015	Mount Lemmon	Mount Lemmon Survey	AST	1.5 km	MPC · JPL
802594	2015 EQ_{77}	—	March 15, 2015	Haleakala	Pan-STARRS 1	PHO	660 m	MPC · JPL
802595	2015 EY_{78}	—	March 10, 2015	Mount Lemmon	Mount Lemmon Survey	·	2.4 km	MPC · JPL
802596	2015 EN_{79}	—	March 15, 2015	Haleakala	Pan-STARRS 1	·	1.6 km	MPC · JPL
802597	2015 EO_{79}	—	March 13, 2015	Mount Lemmon	Mount Lemmon Survey	·	2.3 km	MPC · JPL
802598	2015 FP_{1}	—	February 13, 2015	Mount Lemmon	Mount Lemmon Survey	·	1.4 km	MPC · JPL
802599	2015 FB_{4}	—	February 22, 2015	Haleakala	Pan-STARRS 1	·	1.4 km	MPC · JPL
802600	2015 FN_{8}	—	January 22, 2015	Haleakala	Pan-STARRS 1	BRA	980 m	MPC · JPL

== 802601–802700 ==
back to top

Designation			Discovery			Properties		Ref
Permanent	Provisional	Named after	Date	Site	Discoverer(s)	Category	Diam.	Ref
802601	2015 FY_{9}	—	March 16, 2015	Haleakala	Pan-STARRS 1	·	1.1 km	MPC · JPL
802602	2015 FG_{11}	—	March 21, 2010	Kitt Peak	Spacewatch	·	1.5 km	MPC · JPL
802603	2015 FR_{11}	—	March 17, 2015	Haleakala	Pan-STARRS 1	·	2.1 km	MPC · JPL
802604	2015 FZ_{11}	—	March 16, 2015	Haleakala	Pan-STARRS 1	·	2.1 km	MPC · JPL
802605	2015 FO_{13}	—	March 16, 2015	Haleakala	Pan-STARRS 1	·	1.7 km	MPC · JPL
802606	2015 FT_{16}	—	March 16, 2015	Haleakala	Pan-STARRS 1	EUN	680 m	MPC · JPL
802607	2015 FD_{23}	—	March 16, 2015	Haleakala	Pan-STARRS 1	·	1.4 km	MPC · JPL
802608	2015 FM_{23}	—	March 16, 2015	Haleakala	Pan-STARRS 1	·	1.2 km	MPC · JPL
802609	2015 FT_{26}	—	February 20, 2015	Haleakala	Pan-STARRS 1	·	2.3 km	MPC · JPL
802610	2015 FW_{30}	—	February 23, 2015	Haleakala	Pan-STARRS 1	·	2.3 km	MPC · JPL
802611	2015 FY_{31}	—	March 16, 2015	Haleakala	Pan-STARRS 1	·	1.6 km	MPC · JPL
802612	2015 FM_{32}	—	October 30, 2005	Kitt Peak	Spacewatch	MAR	640 m	MPC · JPL
802613	2015 FG_{33}	—	August 25, 2003	Palomar Mountain	NEAT	H	540 m	MPC · JPL
802614	2015 FE_{40}	—	March 17, 2015	Haleakala	Pan-STARRS 1	·	1.2 km	MPC · JPL
802615	2015 FX_{57}	—	November 20, 2009	Kitt Peak	Spacewatch	·	1.3 km	MPC · JPL
802616	2015 FB_{59}	—	January 24, 2015	Haleakala	Pan-STARRS 1	·	1.3 km	MPC · JPL
802617	2015 FZ_{59}	—	February 20, 2015	Haleakala	Pan-STARRS 1	·	1.6 km	MPC · JPL
802618	2015 FU_{63}	—	March 18, 2015	Haleakala	Pan-STARRS 1	·	2.4 km	MPC · JPL
802619	2015 FN_{68}	—	March 18, 2015	Haleakala	Pan-STARRS 1	·	2.1 km	MPC · JPL
802620	2015 FG_{70}	—	March 18, 2015	Haleakala	Pan-STARRS 1	·	2.3 km	MPC · JPL
802621	2015 FO_{70}	—	March 18, 2015	Haleakala	Pan-STARRS 1	·	3.6 km	MPC · JPL
802622	2015 FB_{73}	—	May 19, 2012	Mount Lemmon	Mount Lemmon Survey	·	480 m	MPC · JPL
802623	2015 FZ_{78}	—	April 16, 2004	Sacramento Peak	SDSS	·	1.8 km	MPC · JPL
802624	2015 FC_{81}	—	October 20, 2008	Mount Lemmon	Mount Lemmon Survey	·	1.2 km	MPC · JPL
802625	2015 FC_{84}	—	January 26, 2015	Haleakala	Pan-STARRS 1	EOS	1.5 km	MPC · JPL
802626	2015 FE_{86}	—	January 22, 2015	Haleakala	Pan-STARRS 1	·	1.6 km	MPC · JPL
802627	2015 FM_{91}	—	May 25, 2006	Mount Lemmon	Mount Lemmon Survey	·	1.3 km	MPC · JPL
802628	2015 FJ_{92}	—	January 26, 2015	Haleakala	Pan-STARRS 1	·	1.4 km	MPC · JPL
802629	2015 FK_{95}	—	March 20, 2015	Haleakala	Pan-STARRS 1	·	2.3 km	MPC · JPL
802630	2015 FR_{95}	—	March 20, 2015	Haleakala	Pan-STARRS 1	EOS	1.3 km	MPC · JPL
802631	2015 FL_{97}	—	October 21, 2008	Mount Lemmon	Mount Lemmon Survey	H	340 m	MPC · JPL
802632	2015 FM_{98}	—	March 20, 2015	Haleakala	Pan-STARRS 1	·	1.5 km	MPC · JPL
802633	2015 FG_{99}	—	March 20, 2015	Haleakala	Pan-STARRS 1	·	1.6 km	MPC · JPL
802634	2015 FR_{104}	—	March 20, 2015	Haleakala	Pan-STARRS 1	·	1.6 km	MPC · JPL
802635	2015 FS_{111}	—	March 20, 2015	Haleakala	Pan-STARRS 1	L4	6.7 km	MPC · JPL
802636	2015 FO_{114}	—	November 19, 2012	Kitt Peak	Spacewatch	·	2.4 km	MPC · JPL
802637	2015 FL_{116}	—	January 20, 2015	Haleakala	Pan-STARRS 1	·	1.3 km	MPC · JPL
802638	2015 FH_{124}	—	December 17, 2007	Mount Lemmon	Mount Lemmon Survey	·	510 m	MPC · JPL
802639	2015 FT_{124}	—	March 19, 2015	Haleakala	Pan-STARRS 1	H	460 m	MPC · JPL
802640	2015 FZ_{124}	—	January 21, 2015	Haleakala	Pan-STARRS 1	·	1.3 km	MPC · JPL
802641	2015 FC_{125}	—	January 23, 2015	Haleakala	Pan-STARRS 1	·	2.5 km	MPC · JPL
802642	2015 FV_{133}	—	January 23, 2015	Haleakala	Pan-STARRS 1	·	1.8 km	MPC · JPL
802643	2015 FY_{136}	—	March 21, 2015	Haleakala	Pan-STARRS 1	KOR	850 m	MPC · JPL
802644	2015 FU_{140}	—	May 4, 2005	Mount Lemmon	Mount Lemmon Survey	·	550 m	MPC · JPL
802645	2015 FK_{145}	—	March 12, 2010	Mount Lemmon	Mount Lemmon Survey	·	1.1 km	MPC · JPL
802646	2015 FJ_{150}	—	March 21, 2015	Haleakala	Pan-STARRS 1	·	2.1 km	MPC · JPL
802647	2015 FB_{156}	—	March 21, 2015	Haleakala	Pan-STARRS 1	·	1.1 km	MPC · JPL
802648	2015 FJ_{158}	—	March 21, 2015	Haleakala	Pan-STARRS 1	EOS	1.2 km	MPC · JPL
802649	2015 FR_{158}	—	January 10, 2013	Haleakala	Pan-STARRS 1	L4	5.9 km	MPC · JPL
802650	2015 FL_{159}	—	March 21, 2015	Haleakala	Pan-STARRS 1	·	1.4 km	MPC · JPL
802651	2015 FP_{160}	—	March 21, 2015	Haleakala	Pan-STARRS 1	EOS	1.4 km	MPC · JPL
802652	2015 FD_{168}	—	February 8, 2011	Mount Lemmon	Mount Lemmon Survey	·	950 m	MPC · JPL
802653	2015 FL_{168}	—	March 21, 2015	Haleakala	Pan-STARRS 1	MAS	540 m	MPC · JPL
802654	2015 FG_{173}	—	March 21, 2015	Haleakala	Pan-STARRS 1	L4	5.5 km	MPC · JPL
802655	2015 FY_{175}	—	March 21, 2015	Haleakala	Pan-STARRS 1	·	1.5 km	MPC · JPL
802656	2015 FZ_{175}	—	March 21, 2015	Haleakala	Pan-STARRS 1	·	1.5 km	MPC · JPL
802657	2015 FO_{178}	—	February 14, 2008	Mount Lemmon	Mount Lemmon Survey	·	540 m	MPC · JPL
802658	2015 FS_{178}	—	March 22, 2015	Kitt Peak	Spacewatch	·	410 m	MPC · JPL
802659	2015 FK_{179}	—	February 27, 2015	Haleakala	Pan-STARRS 1	·	1.5 km	MPC · JPL
802660	2015 FT_{181}	—	January 19, 2015	Haleakala	Pan-STARRS 1	·	570 m	MPC · JPL
802661	2015 FY_{184}	—	March 22, 2015	Mount Lemmon	Mount Lemmon Survey	·	1.6 km	MPC · JPL
802662	2015 FL_{186}	—	March 22, 2015	Mount Lemmon	Mount Lemmon Survey	MAR	650 m	MPC · JPL
802663	2015 FY_{186}	—	March 22, 2015	Haleakala	Pan-STARRS 1	·	1.6 km	MPC · JPL
802664	2015 FK_{198}	—	January 8, 2014	La Silla	Barbieri, C.	·	2.1 km	MPC · JPL
802665	2015 FR_{203}	—	January 22, 2015	Haleakala	Pan-STARRS 1	·	640 m	MPC · JPL
802666	2015 FM_{205}	—	November 19, 2008	Mount Lemmon	Mount Lemmon Survey	·	1.1 km	MPC · JPL
802667	2015 FO_{208}	—	December 15, 2009	Mount Lemmon	Mount Lemmon Survey	AEO	860 m	MPC · JPL
802668	2015 FX_{210}	—	March 22, 2015	Haleakala	Pan-STARRS 1	·	1.5 km	MPC · JPL
802669	2015 FB_{213}	—	February 23, 2015	Haleakala	Pan-STARRS 1	H	370 m	MPC · JPL
802670	2015 FL_{214}	—	April 9, 2010	Mount Lemmon	Mount Lemmon Survey	·	1.4 km	MPC · JPL
802671	2015 FM_{214}	—	March 22, 2015	Haleakala	Pan-STARRS 1	·	2.4 km	MPC · JPL
802672	2015 FP_{215}	—	February 18, 2015	Haleakala	Pan-STARRS 1	·	1.5 km	MPC · JPL
802673	2015 FC_{223}	—	February 18, 2015	Haleakala	Pan-STARRS 1	·	1.3 km	MPC · JPL
802674	2015 FX_{223}	—	November 10, 2013	Mount Lemmon	Mount Lemmon Survey	·	1.2 km	MPC · JPL
802675	2015 FR_{225}	—	November 29, 2013	Haleakala	Pan-STARRS 1	·	1.5 km	MPC · JPL
802676	2015 FU_{229}	—	February 27, 2015	Haleakala	Pan-STARRS 1	·	1.3 km	MPC · JPL
802677	2015 FG_{232}	—	February 16, 2015	Haleakala	Pan-STARRS 1	KOR	1.1 km	MPC · JPL
802678	2015 FW_{232}	—	February 27, 2015	Haleakala	Pan-STARRS 1	·	800 m	MPC · JPL
802679	2015 FA_{235}	—	February 27, 2015	Haleakala	Pan-STARRS 1	KOR	1.0 km	MPC · JPL
802680	2015 FZ_{237}	—	March 23, 2015	Haleakala	Pan-STARRS 1	(16286)	1.3 km	MPC · JPL
802681	2015 FV_{238}	—	February 18, 2015	Haleakala	Pan-STARRS 1	·	1.5 km	MPC · JPL
802682	2015 FQ_{239}	—	March 23, 2015	Haleakala	Pan-STARRS 1	·	1.2 km	MPC · JPL
802683	2015 FQ_{245}	—	March 23, 2015	Haleakala	Pan-STARRS 1	·	710 m	MPC · JPL
802684	2015 FV_{246}	—	March 23, 2015	Haleakala	Pan-STARRS 1	·	1.7 km	MPC · JPL
802685	2015 FF_{249}	—	January 23, 2015	Haleakala	Pan-STARRS 1	·	1.4 km	MPC · JPL
802686	2015 FP_{249}	—	March 23, 2015	Haleakala	Pan-STARRS 1	·	1.4 km	MPC · JPL
802687	2015 FT_{269}	—	March 24, 2015	Haleakala	Pan-STARRS 1	·	1.7 km	MPC · JPL
802688	2015 FU_{269}	—	February 15, 2015	Haleakala	Pan-STARRS 1	·	1.8 km	MPC · JPL
802689	2015 FW_{273}	—	January 21, 2015	Haleakala	Pan-STARRS 1	·	1.6 km	MPC · JPL
802690	2015 FP_{275}	—	February 19, 2015	Haleakala	Pan-STARRS 1	·	1.5 km	MPC · JPL
802691	2015 FD_{276}	—	February 17, 2015	Haleakala	Pan-STARRS 1	·	1.7 km	MPC · JPL
802692	2015 FR_{276}	—	January 21, 2015	Haleakala	Pan-STARRS 1	·	520 m	MPC · JPL
802693	2015 FW_{278}	—	March 24, 2015	Haleakala	Pan-STARRS 1	·	1.3 km	MPC · JPL
802694	2015 FU_{281}	—	February 16, 2015	Haleakala	Pan-STARRS 1	KOR	1.0 km	MPC · JPL
802695	2015 FP_{286}	—	February 24, 2015	Haleakala	Pan-STARRS 1	·	640 m	MPC · JPL
802696	2015 FT_{289}	—	March 27, 2015	Mount Lemmon	Mount Lemmon Survey	·	1.9 km	MPC · JPL
802697	2015 FL_{293}	—	August 18, 2009	Kitt Peak	Spacewatch	·	500 m	MPC · JPL
802698	2015 FR_{293}	—	March 27, 2015	Mount Lemmon	Mount Lemmon Survey	·	2.8 km	MPC · JPL
802699	2015 FK_{294}	—	January 3, 2014	Kitt Peak	Spacewatch	EMA	2.1 km	MPC · JPL
802700	2015 FZ_{294}	—	March 28, 2015	Haleakala	Pan-STARRS 1	·	1.2 km	MPC · JPL

== 802701–802800 ==
back to top

Designation			Discovery			Properties		Ref
Permanent	Provisional	Named after	Date	Site	Discoverer(s)	Category	Diam.	Ref
802701	2015 FU_{303}	—	March 28, 2015	Haleakala	Pan-STARRS 1	·	1.5 km	MPC · JPL
802702	2015 FO_{304}	—	May 5, 2002	Palomar Mountain	NEAT	H	470 m	MPC · JPL
802703	2015 FB_{313}	—	March 25, 2015	Haleakala	Pan-STARRS 1	·	1.5 km	MPC · JPL
802704	2015 FG_{315}	—	March 25, 2015	Haleakala	Pan-STARRS 1	·	1.9 km	MPC · JPL
802705	2015 FD_{317}	—	March 25, 2015	Haleakala	Pan-STARRS 1	·	1.9 km	MPC · JPL
802706	2015 FL_{319}	—	March 25, 2015	Haleakala	Pan-STARRS 1	·	1.5 km	MPC · JPL
802707	2015 FV_{319}	—	March 25, 2015	Haleakala	Pan-STARRS 1	·	2.2 km	MPC · JPL
802708	2015 FP_{321}	—	January 2, 2014	Kitt Peak	Spacewatch	·	1.6 km	MPC · JPL
802709	2015 FN_{325}	—	March 25, 2015	Haleakala	Pan-STARRS 1	·	1.4 km	MPC · JPL
802710	2015 FQ_{325}	—	January 23, 2015	Haleakala	Pan-STARRS 1	·	2.0 km	MPC · JPL
802711	2015 FN_{330}	—	March 25, 2015	Haleakala	Pan-STARRS 1	HNS	700 m	MPC · JPL
802712	2015 FZ_{334}	—	April 6, 2008	Mount Lemmon	Mount Lemmon Survey	·	580 m	MPC · JPL
802713	2015 FK_{336}	—	November 21, 1998	Kitt Peak	Spacewatch	H	450 m	MPC · JPL
802714	2015 FV_{341}	—	February 19, 2015	Mount Lemmon	Mount Lemmon Survey	H	480 m	MPC · JPL
802715	2015 FU_{345}	—	January 14, 2015	Haleakala	Pan-STARRS 1	H	400 m	MPC · JPL
802716	2015 FX_{347}	—	February 18, 2015	Haleakala	Pan-STARRS 1	L4	6.8 km	MPC · JPL
802717	2015 FK_{348}	—	March 16, 2015	Haleakala	Pan-STARRS 1	·	1.4 km	MPC · JPL
802718	2015 FY_{348}	—	February 18, 2015	Haleakala	Pan-STARRS 1	·	1.6 km	MPC · JPL
802719	2015 FH_{349}	—	March 16, 2015	Haleakala	Pan-STARRS 1	·	2.6 km	MPC · JPL
802720	2015 FM_{350}	—	March 16, 2015	Haleakala	Pan-STARRS 1	TIR	2.1 km	MPC · JPL
802721	2015 FC_{351}	—	March 16, 2015	Haleakala	Pan-STARRS 1	·	2.6 km	MPC · JPL
802722	2015 FZ_{351}	—	March 16, 2015	Haleakala	Pan-STARRS 1	·	2.0 km	MPC · JPL
802723	2015 FW_{354}	—	March 17, 2015	Haleakala	Pan-STARRS 1	·	1.9 km	MPC · JPL
802724	2015 FD_{355}	—	May 10, 2005	Cerro Tololo	Deep Ecliptic Survey	·	1.2 km	MPC · JPL
802725	2015 FC_{357}	—	March 17, 2015	Haleakala	Pan-STARRS 1	H	360 m	MPC · JPL
802726	2015 FQ_{359}	—	March 17, 2015	Haleakala	Pan-STARRS 1	EOS	1.6 km	MPC · JPL
802727	2015 FP_{361}	—	March 17, 2015	Haleakala	Pan-STARRS 1	·	1.2 km	MPC · JPL
802728	2015 FY_{365}	—	January 20, 2015	Haleakala	Pan-STARRS 1	·	1.4 km	MPC · JPL
802729	2015 FK_{367}	—	March 18, 2015	Haleakala	Pan-STARRS 1	·	2.3 km	MPC · JPL
802730	2015 FG_{369}	—	February 20, 2015	Haleakala	Pan-STARRS 1	·	1.1 km	MPC · JPL
802731	2015 FU_{377}	—	August 27, 2006	Anderson Mesa	LONEOS	H	410 m	MPC · JPL
802732	2015 FB_{387}	—	March 20, 2015	Haleakala	Pan-STARRS 1	L4	5.4 km	MPC · JPL
802733	2015 FT_{388}	—	March 20, 2015	Haleakala	Pan-STARRS 1	·	1.3 km	MPC · JPL
802734	2015 FY_{389}	—	January 20, 2015	Haleakala	Pan-STARRS 1	·	1.4 km	MPC · JPL
802735	2015 FZ_{390}	—	March 20, 2015	Haleakala	Pan-STARRS 1	·	1.8 km	MPC · JPL
802736	2015 FB_{392}	—	August 25, 2012	Kitt Peak	Spacewatch	·	1.7 km	MPC · JPL
802737	2015 FC_{393}	—	April 18, 2007	Kitt Peak	Spacewatch	H	420 m	MPC · JPL
802738	2015 FJ_{393}	—	October 24, 2013	Mount Lemmon	Mount Lemmon Survey	H	320 m	MPC · JPL
802739	2015 FE_{394}	—	March 31, 2015	Haleakala	Pan-STARRS 1	H	350 m	MPC · JPL
802740	2015 FF_{396}	—	March 30, 2015	Haleakala	Pan-STARRS 1	·	1.2 km	MPC · JPL
802741	2015 FR_{397}	—	March 25, 2015	Haleakala	Pan-STARRS 1	TIR	2.2 km	MPC · JPL
802742	2015 FS_{406}	—	March 18, 2015	Haleakala	Pan-STARRS 1	·	1.1 km	MPC · JPL
802743	2015 FS_{407}	—	December 29, 2013	Haleakala	Pan-STARRS 1	·	1.1 km	MPC · JPL
802744	2015 FW_{407}	—	March 21, 2015	Haleakala	Pan-STARRS 1	·	1.4 km	MPC · JPL
802745	2015 FZ_{407}	—	March 21, 2015	Haleakala	Pan-STARRS 1	·	1.2 km	MPC · JPL
802746	2015 FU_{412}	—	March 29, 2015	Mount Lemmon	Mount Lemmon Survey	·	3.0 km	MPC · JPL
802747	2015 FZ_{412}	—	March 29, 2015	Haleakala	Pan-STARRS 1	·	1.7 km	MPC · JPL
802748	2015 FC_{413}	—	March 29, 2015	Haleakala	Pan-STARRS 1	·	500 m	MPC · JPL
802749	2015 FL_{415}	—	March 28, 2015	Haleakala	Pan-STARRS 1	·	2.2 km	MPC · JPL
802750	2015 FB_{416}	—	March 27, 2015	Kitt Peak	Spacewatch	H	470 m	MPC · JPL
802751	2015 FC_{416}	—	July 5, 2016	Mount Lemmon	Mount Lemmon Survey	EOS	1.5 km	MPC · JPL
802752	2015 FK_{417}	—	March 22, 2015	Haleakala	Pan-STARRS 1	·	2.3 km	MPC · JPL
802753	2015 FL_{418}	—	March 21, 2015	Haleakala	Pan-STARRS 1	·	1.5 km	MPC · JPL
802754	2015 FT_{418}	—	March 22, 2015	Haleakala	Pan-STARRS 1	H	340 m	MPC · JPL
802755	2015 FT_{419}	—	March 17, 2015	Haleakala	Pan-STARRS 1	L4	6.6 km	MPC · JPL
802756	2015 FA_{422}	—	March 22, 2015	Haleakala	Pan-STARRS 1	RAF	600 m	MPC · JPL
802757	2015 FU_{422}	—	March 27, 2015	Mount Lemmon	Mount Lemmon Survey	·	1.7 km	MPC · JPL
802758	2015 FD_{423}	—	October 20, 2016	Mount Lemmon	Mount Lemmon Survey	·	560 m	MPC · JPL
802759	2015 FG_{423}	—	June 25, 2017	Haleakala	Pan-STARRS 1	·	2.4 km	MPC · JPL
802760	2015 FF_{429}	—	March 22, 2015	Haleakala	Pan-STARRS 1	·	2.3 km	MPC · JPL
802761	2015 FL_{429}	—	March 22, 2015	Haleakala	Pan-STARRS 1	EOS	1.5 km	MPC · JPL
802762	2015 FU_{429}	—	March 28, 2015	Haleakala	Pan-STARRS 1	·	2.4 km	MPC · JPL
802763	2015 FW_{429}	—	March 17, 2015	Haleakala	Pan-STARRS 1	·	1.5 km	MPC · JPL
802764	2015 FX_{429}	—	March 22, 2015	Haleakala	Pan-STARRS 1	·	1.4 km	MPC · JPL
802765	2015 FF_{430}	—	March 19, 2015	Haleakala	Pan-STARRS 1	·	2.1 km	MPC · JPL
802766	2015 FG_{430}	—	March 22, 2015	Haleakala	Pan-STARRS 1	·	1.8 km	MPC · JPL
802767	2015 FZ_{430}	—	March 21, 2015	Haleakala	Pan-STARRS 1	EOS	1.5 km	MPC · JPL
802768	2015 FL_{431}	—	March 21, 2015	Haleakala	Pan-STARRS 1	BRA	960 m	MPC · JPL
802769	2015 FS_{431}	—	March 22, 2015	Mount Lemmon	Mount Lemmon Survey	·	1.0 km	MPC · JPL
802770	2015 FG_{432}	—	March 30, 2015	Haleakala	Pan-STARRS 1	·	1.6 km	MPC · JPL
802771	2015 FS_{432}	—	March 22, 2015	Haleakala	Pan-STARRS 1	·	1.2 km	MPC · JPL
802772	2015 FB_{434}	—	March 22, 2015	Haleakala	Pan-STARRS 1	·	1.5 km	MPC · JPL
802773	2015 FS_{434}	—	March 17, 2015	Haleakala	Pan-STARRS 1	·	1.8 km	MPC · JPL
802774	2015 FH_{436}	—	March 21, 2015	Haleakala	Pan-STARRS 1	·	1.9 km	MPC · JPL
802775	2015 FS_{436}	—	March 30, 2015	Haleakala	Pan-STARRS 1	·	850 m	MPC · JPL
802776	2015 FJ_{437}	—	March 22, 2015	Haleakala	Pan-STARRS 1	·	1.6 km	MPC · JPL
802777	2015 FD_{438}	—	March 29, 2015	Haleakala	Pan-STARRS 1	·	1.3 km	MPC · JPL
802778	2015 FO_{438}	—	March 21, 2015	Haleakala	Pan-STARRS 1	PHO	650 m	MPC · JPL
802779	2015 FT_{438}	—	March 30, 2015	Haleakala	Pan-STARRS 1	·	1.4 km	MPC · JPL
802780	2015 FZ_{438}	—	March 26, 2015	Kitt Peak	Spacewatch	·	1.1 km	MPC · JPL
802781	2015 FC_{439}	—	March 21, 2015	Haleakala	Pan-STARRS 1	·	1.5 km	MPC · JPL
802782	2015 FJ_{442}	—	March 21, 2015	Haleakala	Pan-STARRS 1	EOS	1.4 km	MPC · JPL
802783	2015 FC_{443}	—	March 24, 2015	Haleakala	Pan-STARRS 1	VER	2.0 km	MPC · JPL
802784	2015 FK_{443}	—	March 24, 2015	Mount Lemmon	Mount Lemmon Survey	·	2.0 km	MPC · JPL
802785	2015 FX_{445}	—	March 28, 2015	Haleakala	Pan-STARRS 1	VER	1.9 km	MPC · JPL
802786	2015 FG_{446}	—	March 25, 2015	Haleakala	Pan-STARRS 1	L4	5.8 km	MPC · JPL
802787	2015 FX_{448}	—	March 21, 2015	Haleakala	Pan-STARRS 1	KOR	940 m	MPC · JPL
802788	2015 FD_{450}	—	March 31, 2015	Haleakala	Pan-STARRS 1	·	1.4 km	MPC · JPL
802789	2015 FL_{450}	—	March 22, 2015	Haleakala	Pan-STARRS 1	·	1.3 km	MPC · JPL
802790	2015 FM_{451}	—	March 16, 2015	Mount Lemmon	Mount Lemmon Survey	·	1.8 km	MPC · JPL
802791	2015 FE_{453}	—	March 21, 2015	Mount Lemmon	Mount Lemmon Survey	·	860 m	MPC · JPL
802792	2015 FF_{456}	—	January 28, 2015	Haleakala	Pan-STARRS 1	·	1.8 km	MPC · JPL
802793	2015 FE_{457}	—	March 24, 2015	Mount Lemmon	Mount Lemmon Survey	·	600 m	MPC · JPL
802794	2015 FX_{457}	—	December 31, 2013	Mount Lemmon	Mount Lemmon Survey	·	1.5 km	MPC · JPL
802795	2015 FG_{458}	—	March 21, 2015	Haleakala	Pan-STARRS 1	·	1.4 km	MPC · JPL
802796	2015 FY_{458}	—	March 29, 2015	Haleakala	Pan-STARRS 1	·	620 m	MPC · JPL
802797	2015 FP_{462}	—	March 20, 2015	Haleakala	Pan-STARRS 1	·	1.2 km	MPC · JPL
802798	2015 FA_{466}	—	March 21, 2015	Haleakala	Pan-STARRS 1	·	2.3 km	MPC · JPL
802799	2015 FC_{466}	—	March 28, 2015	Haleakala	Pan-STARRS 1	·	2.3 km	MPC · JPL
802800	2015 FC_{467}	—	March 22, 2015	Haleakala	Pan-STARRS 1	·	1.9 km	MPC · JPL

== 802801–802900 ==
back to top

Designation			Discovery			Properties		Ref
Permanent	Provisional	Named after	Date	Site	Discoverer(s)	Category	Diam.	Ref
802801	2015 FL_{467}	—	March 24, 2015	Mount Lemmon	Mount Lemmon Survey	KOR	1.1 km	MPC · JPL
802802	2015 FM_{467}	—	March 23, 2015	Kitt Peak	L. H. Wasserman, M. W. Buie	·	1.7 km	MPC · JPL
802803	2015 FQ_{468}	—	March 17, 2015	Haleakala	Pan-STARRS 1	EOS	1.1 km	MPC · JPL
802804	2015 FD_{470}	—	March 28, 2015	Haleakala	Pan-STARRS 1	·	1.1 km	MPC · JPL
802805	2015 FL_{472}	—	March 22, 2015	Mount Lemmon	Mount Lemmon Survey	·	1.2 km	MPC · JPL
802806	2015 FT_{472}	—	March 21, 2015	Haleakala	Pan-STARRS 1	EOS	1.3 km	MPC · JPL
802807	2015 FT_{473}	—	April 9, 2010	Mount Lemmon	Mount Lemmon Survey	·	1.2 km	MPC · JPL
802808	2015 FA_{474}	—	March 25, 2015	Haleakala	Pan-STARRS 1	EOS	1.2 km	MPC · JPL
802809	2015 FE_{474}	—	March 21, 2015	Haleakala	Pan-STARRS 1	L4	5.4 km	MPC · JPL
802810	2015 FP_{481}	—	November 27, 2017	Mount Lemmon	Mount Lemmon Survey	·	910 m	MPC · JPL
802811	2015 FY_{482}	—	March 17, 2015	Mount Lemmon	Mount Lemmon Survey	·	1.6 km	MPC · JPL
802812	2015 FK_{493}	—	May 1, 2016	Cerro Tololo	DECam	L4	4.9 km	MPC · JPL
802813	2015 GN_{2}	—	February 2, 2008	Mount Lemmon	Mount Lemmon Survey	·	550 m	MPC · JPL
802814	2015 GX_{3}	—	April 10, 2015	Mount Lemmon	Mount Lemmon Survey	EOS	1.2 km	MPC · JPL
802815	2015 GM_{4}	—	October 9, 2012	Haleakala	Pan-STARRS 1	·	1.0 km	MPC · JPL
802816	2015 GE_{7}	—	March 16, 2015	Haleakala	Pan-STARRS 1	·	2.0 km	MPC · JPL
802817	2015 GF_{9}	—	April 10, 2015	Mount Lemmon	Mount Lemmon Survey	·	1.6 km	MPC · JPL
802818	2015 GM_{13}	—	April 10, 2015	Haleakala	Pan-STARRS 1	H	460 m	MPC · JPL
802819	2015 GN_{16}	—	February 24, 2015	Haleakala	Pan-STARRS 1	·	760 m	MPC · JPL
802820	2015 GL_{20}	—	March 22, 2015	Haleakala	Pan-STARRS 1	·	790 m	MPC · JPL
802821	2015 GV_{22}	—	April 12, 2015	Haleakala	Pan-STARRS 1	·	2.4 km	MPC · JPL
802822	2015 GZ_{22}	—	February 16, 2015	Haleakala	Pan-STARRS 1	·	660 m	MPC · JPL
802823	2015 GY_{33}	—	January 24, 2014	Haleakala	Pan-STARRS 1	EOS	1.4 km	MPC · JPL
802824	2015 GO_{42}	—	March 22, 2015	Haleakala	Pan-STARRS 1	·	1.5 km	MPC · JPL
802825	2015 GP_{42}	—	March 21, 2015	Haleakala	Pan-STARRS 1	·	920 m	MPC · JPL
802826	2015 GT_{42}	—	April 15, 2015	Haleakala	Pan-STARRS 1	·	1.6 km	MPC · JPL
802827	2015 GO_{47}	—	February 20, 2009	Kitt Peak	Spacewatch	URS	2.2 km	MPC · JPL
802828	2015 GS_{52}	—	January 28, 2015	Haleakala	Pan-STARRS 1	·	1.1 km	MPC · JPL
802829	2015 GO_{59}	—	April 14, 2015	Mount Lemmon	Mount Lemmon Survey	EOS	1.4 km	MPC · JPL
802830	2015 GP_{59}	—	April 12, 2015	Haleakala	Pan-STARRS 1	MAR	790 m	MPC · JPL
802831	2015 GQ_{59}	—	April 12, 2015	Haleakala	Pan-STARRS 1	·	2.5 km	MPC · JPL
802832	2015 GT_{60}	—	April 22, 1998	Kitt Peak	Spacewatch	·	830 m	MPC · JPL
802833	2015 GH_{61}	—	April 1, 2015	Mount Lemmon	Mount Lemmon Survey	H	410 m	MPC · JPL
802834	2015 GR_{61}	—	April 9, 2015	Mount Lemmon	Mount Lemmon Survey	KOR	970 m	MPC · JPL
802835	2015 GS_{61}	—	April 14, 2015	Cerro Paranal	Gaia Ground Based Optical Tracking	·	760 m	MPC · JPL
802836	2015 GP_{62}	—	April 14, 2015	Mount Lemmon	Mount Lemmon Survey	·	1.4 km	MPC · JPL
802837	2015 GS_{62}	—	April 13, 2015	Haleakala	Pan-STARRS 1	·	1.5 km	MPC · JPL
802838	2015 GR_{63}	—	April 13, 2015	Haleakala	Pan-STARRS 1	·	1.6 km	MPC · JPL
802839	2015 GV_{63}	—	April 14, 2015	Mount Lemmon	Mount Lemmon Survey	EOS	1.3 km	MPC · JPL
802840	2015 GY_{63}	—	March 27, 2015	Kitt Peak	Spacewatch	·	1.3 km	MPC · JPL
802841	2015 GX_{65}	—	April 9, 2015	Mount Lemmon	Mount Lemmon Survey	·	990 m	MPC · JPL
802842	2015 GC_{66}	—	April 12, 2015	Haleakala	Pan-STARRS 1	·	2.3 km	MPC · JPL
802843	2015 GJ_{66}	—	April 13, 2015	Haleakala	Pan-STARRS 1	·	2.1 km	MPC · JPL
802844	2015 GT_{66}	—	April 13, 2015	Haleakala	Pan-STARRS 1	·	2.2 km	MPC · JPL
802845	2015 GB_{68}	—	April 11, 2015	Mount Lemmon	Mount Lemmon Survey	HOF	1.6 km	MPC · JPL
802846	2015 GH_{68}	—	April 10, 2015	Mount Lemmon	Mount Lemmon Survey	L4	7.2 km	MPC · JPL
802847	2015 GJ_{68}	—	April 9, 2015	Mount Lemmon	Mount Lemmon Survey	·	530 m	MPC · JPL
802848	2015 GO_{70}	—	April 10, 2015	Mount Lemmon	Mount Lemmon Survey	EOS	1.2 km	MPC · JPL
802849	2015 GX_{70}	—	April 10, 2015	Haleakala	Pan-STARRS 1	EOS	1.5 km	MPC · JPL
802850	2015 GH_{74}	—	April 10, 2015	Mount Lemmon	Mount Lemmon Survey	·	1.2 km	MPC · JPL
802851	2015 GC_{80}	—	April 13, 2015	Cerro Paranal	Gaia Ground Based Optical Tracking	·	1.3 km	MPC · JPL
802852	2015 HV_{1}	—	February 23, 2015	Haleakala	Pan-STARRS 1	·	1.2 km	MPC · JPL
802853	2015 HY_{4}	—	April 16, 2015	Haleakala	Pan-STARRS 1	·	2.6 km	MPC · JPL
802854	2015 HA_{8}	—	December 29, 2014	Haleakala	Pan-STARRS 1	BRA	1.1 km	MPC · JPL
802855	2015 HU_{11}	—	January 28, 2015	Haleakala	Pan-STARRS 1	H	390 m	MPC · JPL
802856	2015 HB_{16}	—	February 3, 2008	Kitt Peak	Spacewatch	·	560 m	MPC · JPL
802857	2015 HL_{18}	—	January 3, 2011	Mount Lemmon	Mount Lemmon Survey	·	530 m	MPC · JPL
802858	2015 HN_{22}	—	May 22, 2011	Mount Lemmon	Mount Lemmon Survey	·	1.2 km	MPC · JPL
802859	2015 HO_{26}	—	April 17, 2010	Kitt Peak	Spacewatch	·	1.1 km	MPC · JPL
802860	2015 HQ_{29}	—	February 26, 2008	Mount Lemmon	Mount Lemmon Survey	·	510 m	MPC · JPL
802861	2015 HZ_{29}	—	December 30, 2008	Mount Lemmon	Mount Lemmon Survey	·	1.1 km	MPC · JPL
802862	2015 HU_{31}	—	March 21, 2015	Haleakala	Pan-STARRS 1	·	1.6 km	MPC · JPL
802863	2015 HJ_{45}	—	March 27, 2015	Haleakala	Pan-STARRS 1	·	1.8 km	MPC · JPL
802864	2015 HS_{47}	—	March 25, 2015	Haleakala	Pan-STARRS 1	·	1.3 km	MPC · JPL
802865	2015 HV_{48}	—	December 28, 2013	Kitt Peak	Spacewatch	·	2.3 km	MPC · JPL
802866	2015 HU_{49}	—	March 24, 2015	Haleakala	Pan-STARRS 1	·	1.8 km	MPC · JPL
802867	2015 HX_{49}	—	April 10, 2010	Westfield	International Astronomical Search Collaboration	·	1.1 km	MPC · JPL
802868	2015 HY_{52}	—	April 10, 2015	Mount Lemmon	Mount Lemmon Survey	EOS	1.6 km	MPC · JPL
802869	2015 HZ_{54}	—	March 21, 2015	Haleakala	Pan-STARRS 1	·	1.3 km	MPC · JPL
802870	2015 HE_{56}	—	April 18, 2015	Haleakala	Pan-STARRS 1	·	2.6 km	MPC · JPL
802871	2015 HU_{59}	—	April 18, 2015	Haleakala	Pan-STARRS 1	·	2.2 km	MPC · JPL
802872	2015 HB_{66}	—	April 23, 2015	Haleakala	Pan-STARRS 1	·	570 m	MPC · JPL
802873	2015 HZ_{73}	—	October 18, 2012	Haleakala	Pan-STARRS 1	·	1.4 km	MPC · JPL
802874	2015 HQ_{75}	—	March 18, 2015	Haleakala	Pan-STARRS 1	THM	1.6 km	MPC · JPL
802875	2015 HV_{77}	—	April 23, 2015	Haleakala	Pan-STARRS 1	EOS	1.3 km	MPC · JPL
802876	2015 HP_{83}	—	April 23, 2015	Haleakala	Pan-STARRS 1	·	1.2 km	MPC · JPL
802877	2015 HP_{91}	—	February 27, 2015	Haleakala	Pan-STARRS 1	·	1.1 km	MPC · JPL
802878	2015 HZ_{91}	—	April 23, 2015	Haleakala	Pan-STARRS 1	·	1.2 km	MPC · JPL
802879	2015 HG_{99}	—	April 23, 2015	Haleakala	Pan-STARRS 1	KOR	900 m	MPC · JPL
802880	2015 HC_{105}	—	March 21, 2015	Haleakala	Pan-STARRS 1	EOS	1.5 km	MPC · JPL
802881	2015 HW_{105}	—	July 28, 2011	Haleakala	Pan-STARRS 1	·	1.1 km	MPC · JPL
802882	2015 HC_{106}	—	March 22, 2015	Haleakala	Pan-STARRS 1	·	2.3 km	MPC · JPL
802883	2015 HS_{111}	—	March 28, 2015	Haleakala	Pan-STARRS 1	·	1.5 km	MPC · JPL
802884	2015 HB_{113}	—	January 28, 2015	Haleakala	Pan-STARRS 1	·	1.2 km	MPC · JPL
802885	2015 HY_{116}	—	April 13, 2015	Haleakala	Pan-STARRS 1	T_{j} (2.92) · APO +1km · PHA	1.0 km	MPC · JPL
802886	2015 HU_{117}	—	March 14, 2015	Kitt Peak	Spacewatch	BRA	1.4 km	MPC · JPL
802887	2015 HD_{118}	—	April 23, 2015	Haleakala	Pan-STARRS 1	KOR	990 m	MPC · JPL
802888	2015 HJ_{118}	—	December 10, 2010	Mount Lemmon	Mount Lemmon Survey	·	480 m	MPC · JPL
802889	2015 HO_{121}	—	April 23, 2015	Haleakala	Pan-STARRS 1	·	1.3 km	MPC · JPL
802890	2015 HW_{126}	—	April 23, 2015	Haleakala	Pan-STARRS 1	EUN	930 m	MPC · JPL
802891	2015 HN_{131}	—	April 23, 2015	Haleakala	Pan-STARRS 1	THM	1.7 km	MPC · JPL
802892	2015 HC_{137}	—	March 28, 2015	Haleakala	Pan-STARRS 1	·	1.8 km	MPC · JPL
802893	2015 HX_{138}	—	January 28, 2006	Kitt Peak	Spacewatch	·	930 m	MPC · JPL
802894	2015 HA_{139}	—	April 23, 2015	Haleakala	Pan-STARRS 1	·	1.3 km	MPC · JPL
802895	2015 HW_{139}	—	April 23, 2015	Haleakala	Pan-STARRS 1	·	860 m	MPC · JPL
802896	2015 HF_{141}	—	November 13, 2012	Mount Lemmon	Mount Lemmon Survey	·	1.8 km	MPC · JPL
802897	2015 HK_{142}	—	April 23, 2015	Haleakala	Pan-STARRS 1	·	1.8 km	MPC · JPL
802898	2015 HX_{145}	—	April 23, 2015	Haleakala	Pan-STARRS 1	·	1.3 km	MPC · JPL
802899	2015 HG_{153}	—	April 23, 2015	Haleakala	Pan-STARRS 1	·	1.4 km	MPC · JPL
802900	2015 HS_{155}	—	April 18, 2015	Haleakala	Pan-STARRS 1	·	1.6 km	MPC · JPL

== 802901–803000 ==
back to top

Designation			Discovery			Properties		Ref
Permanent	Provisional	Named after	Date	Site	Discoverer(s)	Category	Diam.	Ref
802901	2015 HV_{157}	—	April 24, 2015	Haleakala	Pan-STARRS 1	L4	5.3 km	MPC · JPL
802902	2015 HK_{162}	—	April 24, 2015	Haleakala	Pan-STARRS 1	·	1.1 km	MPC · JPL
802903	2015 HN_{164}	—	April 24, 2015	Haleakala	Pan-STARRS 1	·	810 m	MPC · JPL
802904	2015 HU_{165}	—	April 24, 2015	Haleakala	Pan-STARRS 1	·	1.3 km	MPC · JPL
802905	2015 HH_{166}	—	April 24, 2015	Haleakala	Pan-STARRS 1	·	1.2 km	MPC · JPL
802906	2015 HQ_{179}	—	February 12, 2011	Mount Lemmon	Mount Lemmon Survey	·	980 m	MPC · JPL
802907	2015 HS_{180}	—	March 31, 2015	Haleakala	Pan-STARRS 1	MAR	1.1 km	MPC · JPL
802908	2015 HP_{183}	—	April 23, 2015	Haleakala	Pan-STARRS 1	L4	6.1 km	MPC · JPL
802909	2015 HA_{187}	—	February 25, 2011	Mount Lemmon	Mount Lemmon Survey	·	530 m	MPC · JPL
802910	2015 HC_{191}	—	April 23, 2015	Haleakala	Pan-STARRS 1	EOS	1.3 km	MPC · JPL
802911	2015 HB_{192}	—	April 23, 2015	Haleakala	Pan-STARRS 1	EOS	1.1 km	MPC · JPL
802912	2015 HZ_{193}	—	January 25, 2014	Haleakala	Pan-STARRS 1	·	1.7 km	MPC · JPL
802913	2015 HJ_{194}	—	April 25, 2015	Haleakala	Pan-STARRS 1	·	2.0 km	MPC · JPL
802914	2015 HS_{194}	—	April 25, 2015	Haleakala	Pan-STARRS 1	·	2.1 km	MPC · JPL
802915	2015 HX_{199}	—	April 25, 2015	Haleakala	Pan-STARRS 1	URS	2.0 km	MPC · JPL
802916	2015 HZ_{199}	—	April 20, 2015	Kitt Peak	Spacewatch	·	460 m	MPC · JPL
802917	2015 HA_{200}	—	April 23, 2015	Haleakala	Pan-STARRS 1	·	1.9 km	MPC · JPL
802918	2015 HF_{200}	—	April 23, 2015	Haleakala	Pan-STARRS 1	PHO	680 m	MPC · JPL
802919	2015 HP_{200}	—	April 23, 2015	Haleakala	Pan-STARRS 1	·	2.0 km	MPC · JPL
802920	2015 HU_{200}	—	April 24, 2015	Haleakala	Pan-STARRS 1	·	2.8 km	MPC · JPL
802921	2015 HW_{201}	—	April 25, 2015	Haleakala	Pan-STARRS 1	TIR	2.0 km	MPC · JPL
802922	2015 HQ_{202}	—	May 23, 2004	Kitt Peak	Spacewatch	·	1.7 km	MPC · JPL
802923	2015 HM_{203}	—	October 15, 2017	Mount Lemmon	Mount Lemmon Survey	·	2.0 km	MPC · JPL
802924	2015 HQ_{204}	—	April 25, 2015	Haleakala	Pan-STARRS 1	·	810 m	MPC · JPL
802925	2015 HG_{206}	—	April 18, 2015	Haleakala	Pan-STARRS 1	·	1.9 km	MPC · JPL
802926	2015 HV_{206}	—	August 10, 2016	Haleakala	Pan-STARRS 1	·	980 m	MPC · JPL
802927	2015 HX_{206}	—	April 25, 2015	Haleakala	Pan-STARRS 1	·	2.2 km	MPC · JPL
802928	2015 HK_{207}	—	April 25, 2015	Haleakala	Pan-STARRS 1	·	1.4 km	MPC · JPL
802929	2015 HN_{207}	—	April 23, 2015	Haleakala	Pan-STARRS 1	·	1.3 km	MPC · JPL
802930	2015 HM_{208}	—	April 25, 2015	Haleakala	Pan-STARRS 1	·	1.9 km	MPC · JPL
802931	2015 HN_{209}	—	April 18, 2015	Haleakala	Pan-STARRS 1	·	1.0 km	MPC · JPL
802932	2015 HA_{210}	—	April 23, 2015	Haleakala	Pan-STARRS 1	·	1.0 km	MPC · JPL
802933	2015 HD_{210}	—	April 25, 2015	Haleakala	Pan-STARRS 1	·	1.1 km	MPC · JPL
802934	2015 HL_{210}	—	April 23, 2015	Haleakala	Pan-STARRS 1	·	1.6 km	MPC · JPL
802935	2015 HW_{210}	—	April 25, 2015	Haleakala	Pan-STARRS 1	·	1.6 km	MPC · JPL
802936	2015 HA_{211}	—	April 20, 2015	Haleakala	Pan-STARRS 1	H	320 m	MPC · JPL
802937	2015 HB_{211}	—	April 18, 2015	Haleakala	Pan-STARRS 1	·	1.6 km	MPC · JPL
802938	2015 HO_{211}	—	April 25, 2015	Haleakala	Pan-STARRS 1	EOS	1.2 km	MPC · JPL
802939	2015 HF_{212}	—	April 25, 2015	Haleakala	Pan-STARRS 1	EOS	1.2 km	MPC · JPL
802940	2015 HX_{212}	—	April 25, 2015	Haleakala	Pan-STARRS 1	·	1.3 km	MPC · JPL
802941	2015 HQ_{213}	—	April 25, 2015	Haleakala	Pan-STARRS 1	·	2.1 km	MPC · JPL
802942	2015 HR_{213}	—	April 25, 2015	Haleakala	Pan-STARRS 1	·	2.1 km	MPC · JPL
802943	2015 HV_{213}	—	April 18, 2015	Mount Lemmon	Mount Lemmon Survey	·	1.3 km	MPC · JPL
802944	2015 HY_{213}	—	April 16, 2015	Mount Lemmon	Mount Lemmon Survey	·	1.1 km	MPC · JPL
802945	2015 HT_{214}	—	April 16, 2015	Mount Lemmon	Mount Lemmon Survey	·	1.4 km	MPC · JPL
802946	2015 HN_{215}	—	April 25, 2015	Haleakala	Pan-STARRS 1	·	1.1 km	MPC · JPL
802947	2015 HP_{215}	—	April 25, 2015	Kitt Peak	Spacewatch	·	1.8 km	MPC · JPL
802948	2015 HW_{216}	—	April 23, 2015	Haleakala	Pan-STARRS 1	·	1.4 km	MPC · JPL
802949	2015 HE_{217}	—	April 16, 2015	Cerro Paranal	Gaia Ground Based Optical Tracking	KOR	1 km	MPC · JPL
802950	2015 HX_{217}	—	April 25, 2015	Haleakala	Pan-STARRS 1	·	1.6 km	MPC · JPL
802951	2015 HH_{219}	—	April 23, 2015	Haleakala	Pan-STARRS 1	·	1.5 km	MPC · JPL
802952	2015 HO_{219}	—	April 23, 2015	Haleakala	Pan-STARRS 1	EOS	1.3 km	MPC · JPL
802953	2015 HN_{220}	—	April 23, 2015	Haleakala	Pan-STARRS 1	·	2.0 km	MPC · JPL
802954	2015 HC_{221}	—	April 25, 2015	Haleakala	Pan-STARRS 1	·	2.0 km	MPC · JPL
802955	2015 HD_{221}	—	April 23, 2015	Haleakala	Pan-STARRS 1	HYG	1.7 km	MPC · JPL
802956	2015 HK_{221}	—	April 23, 2015	Haleakala	Pan-STARRS 1	·	1.0 km	MPC · JPL
802957	2015 HU_{221}	—	April 23, 2015	Haleakala	Pan-STARRS 1	·	1.7 km	MPC · JPL
802958	2015 HW_{222}	—	April 23, 2015	Haleakala	Pan-STARRS 2	KON	1.5 km	MPC · JPL
802959	2015 HH_{225}	—	April 23, 2015	Haleakala	Pan-STARRS 1	L4	6.3 km	MPC · JPL
802960	2015 HX_{226}	—	April 25, 2015	Haleakala	Pan-STARRS 1	EOS	1.1 km	MPC · JPL
802961	2015 HK_{228}	—	April 18, 2015	Cerro Tololo	DECam	L4	5.1 km	MPC · JPL
802962	2015 HU_{228}	—	April 18, 2015	Cerro Tololo	DECam	EOS	1.1 km	MPC · JPL
802963	2015 HA_{230}	—	April 13, 2015	Haleakala	Pan-STARRS 1	·	930 m	MPC · JPL
802964	2015 HE_{230}	—	April 18, 2015	Cerro Tololo	DECam	EOS	1.1 km	MPC · JPL
802965	2015 HT_{233}	—	April 20, 2015	Haleakala	Pan-STARRS 1	·	1.8 km	MPC · JPL
802966	2015 HB_{235}	—	April 18, 2015	Cerro Tololo	DECam	L4	5.7 km	MPC · JPL
802967	2015 HL_{237}	—	April 23, 2015	Haleakala	Pan-STARRS 1	EOS	1.1 km	MPC · JPL
802968	2015 HH_{238}	—	March 2, 2009	Mount Lemmon	Mount Lemmon Survey	THB	2.2 km	MPC · JPL
802969	2015 HW_{239}	—	April 21, 2015	Cerro Tololo	DECam	·	1.5 km	MPC · JPL
802970	2015 HP_{241}	—	January 2, 2014	Kitt Peak	Spacewatch	·	2.1 km	MPC · JPL
802971	2015 HF_{242}	—	April 18, 2015	Cerro Tololo	DECam	TRE	1.6 km	MPC · JPL
802972	2015 HG_{249}	—	April 18, 2015	Cerro Tololo	DECam	·	1.3 km	MPC · JPL
802973	2015 HR_{249}	—	April 18, 2015	Cerro Tololo	DECam	·	1.2 km	MPC · JPL
802974	2015 HT_{251}	—	April 20, 2015	Haleakala	Pan-STARRS 1	EUN	790 m	MPC · JPL
802975	2015 HQ_{252}	—	May 18, 2015	Haleakala	Pan-STARRS 1	AGN	770 m	MPC · JPL
802976	2015 HV_{252}	—	April 18, 2015	Cerro Tololo	DECam	L4	5.0 km	MPC · JPL
802977	2015 HY_{254}	—	April 23, 2015	Haleakala	Pan-STARRS 1	·	1.2 km	MPC · JPL
802978	2015 HT_{258}	—	April 18, 2015	Cerro Tololo	DECam	·	980 m	MPC · JPL
802979	2015 HF_{262}	—	April 18, 2015	Cerro Tololo	DECam	L4	5.7 km	MPC · JPL
802980	2015 HH_{263}	—	April 19, 2015	Mount Lemmon	Mount Lemmon Survey	·	1.2 km	MPC · JPL
802981	2015 HH_{265}	—	April 19, 2015	Mount Lemmon	Mount Lemmon Survey	EOS	1.2 km	MPC · JPL
802982	2015 HF_{283}	—	April 18, 2015	Cerro Tololo	DECam	L4	4.8 km	MPC · JPL
802983	2015 HU_{283}	—	April 25, 2015	Haleakala	Pan-STARRS 1	·	1.5 km	MPC · JPL
802984	2015 HW_{283}	—	April 20, 2015	Cerro Tololo-DECam	DECam	·	1.2 km	MPC · JPL
802985	2015 HY_{284}	—	April 18, 2015	Cerro Tololo	DECam	·	2.2 km	MPC · JPL
802986	2015 HG_{288}	—	April 19, 2015	Cerro Tololo	DECam	EOS	1.3 km	MPC · JPL
802987	2015 HX_{288}	—	April 18, 2015	Cerro Tololo	DECam	·	1.9 km	MPC · JPL
802988	2015 HE_{289}	—	April 24, 2015	Haleakala	Pan-STARRS 1	·	2.2 km	MPC · JPL
802989	2015 HN_{290}	—	April 19, 2015	Cerro Tololo	DECam	·	1.7 km	MPC · JPL
802990	2015 HT_{290}	—	April 25, 2015	Cerro Tololo-DECam	DECam	·	1.9 km	MPC · JPL
802991	2015 HB_{293}	—	April 18, 2015	Cerro Tololo	DECam	·	1.3 km	MPC · JPL
802992	2015 HT_{293}	—	April 25, 2015	Haleakala	Pan-STARRS 1	·	2.1 km	MPC · JPL
802993	2015 HN_{295}	—	April 18, 2015	Cerro Tololo	DECam	EOS	1.1 km	MPC · JPL
802994	2015 HS_{297}	—	April 24, 2015	Haleakala	Pan-STARRS 1	·	2.0 km	MPC · JPL
802995	2015 HR_{298}	—	April 21, 2015	Cerro Tololo	DECam	·	1.5 km	MPC · JPL
802996	2015 HU_{298}	—	April 18, 2015	Cerro Tololo	DECam	NAE	1.5 km	MPC · JPL
802997	2015 HA_{301}	—	April 21, 2015	Cerro Tololo	DECam	·	1.2 km	MPC · JPL
802998	2015 HN_{301}	—	April 18, 2015	Cerro Tololo	DECam	EOS	1.3 km	MPC · JPL
802999	2015 HZ_{301}	—	April 25, 2015	Haleakala	Pan-STARRS 1	EOS	1.2 km	MPC · JPL
803000	2015 HS_{305}	—	April 20, 2015	Cerro Tololo-DECam	DECam	·	1.4 km	MPC · JPL

back to top
