= List of minor planets: 774001–775000 =

The following is a partial list of minor planets, running from minor-planet number 774001 through 775000, inclusive. The primary data for this and other partial lists is based on JPL's "Small-Body Orbital Elements" and data available from the Minor Planet Center. Critical list information is also provided by the MPC, unless otherwise specified from Lowell Observatory. A detailed description of the table's columns and additional sources are given on the main page including a complete list of every page in this series, and a statistical break-up on the dynamical classification of minor planets.

Also see the summary list of all named bodies in numerical and alphabetical order, and the corresponding naming citations for the number range of this particular list. New namings may only be added to this list after official publication, as the preannouncement of names is condemned by the Working Group for Small Bodies Nomenclature of the International Astronomical Union.

Near-Earth obj.	MBA (inner)	MBA (outer)	Centaur
Mars-crosser	MBA (middle)	Jupiter trojan	Trans-Neptunian obj.
Unclassified

== 774001–774100 ==
Designation			Discovery			Properties		Ref
Permanent	Provisional	Named after	Date	Site	Discoverer(s)	Category	Diam.	Ref
774001	2000 CV_{154}	—	October 28, 2013	Kitt Peak	Spacewatch	GEF	890 m	MPC · JPL
774002	2000 CQ_{156}	—	October 24, 2015	Mount Lemmon	Mount Lemmon Survey	·	950 m	MPC · JPL
774003	2000 CA_{157}	—	July 27, 2014	Haleakala	Pan-STARRS 1	·	840 m	MPC · JPL
774004	2000 CG_{157}	—	February 12, 2000	Apache Point	SDSS	·	2.1 km	MPC · JPL
774005	2000 EG_{52}	—	September 28, 2019	Mount Lemmon	Mount Lemmon Survey	·	980 m	MPC · JPL
774006	2000 EK_{208}	—	March 5, 2000	Cerro Tololo	Deep Lens Survey	EOS	1.3 km	MPC · JPL
774007	2000 EG_{212}	—	September 24, 2013	Mount Lemmon	Mount Lemmon Survey	·	1.9 km	MPC · JPL
774008	2000 FO_{54}	—	March 30, 2000	Kitt Peak	Spacewatch	JUN	620 m	MPC · JPL
774009	2000 GV_{188}	—	October 24, 2003	Kitt Peak	Spacewatch	THM	1.5 km	MPC · JPL
774010	2000 JX_{95}	—	February 21, 2017	Haleakala	Pan-STARRS 1	·	1.1 km	MPC · JPL
774011	2000 JF_{96}	—	June 6, 2013	Mount Lemmon	Mount Lemmon Survey	·	1.1 km	MPC · JPL
774012	2000 JH_{96}	—	January 28, 2016	Mount Lemmon	Mount Lemmon Survey	THB	1.8 km	MPC · JPL
774013	2000 JN_{96}	—	June 7, 2013	Haleakala	Pan-STARRS 1	·	940 m	MPC · JPL
774014	2000 LZ_{37}	—	July 2, 2013	Haleakala	Pan-STARRS 1	·	1.1 km	MPC · JPL
774015	2000 MV_{7}	—	October 14, 2017	Mount Lemmon	Mount Lemmon Survey	·	1.9 km	MPC · JPL
774016	2000 OD_{62}	—	July 30, 2000	Cerro Tololo	Deep Ecliptic Survey	·	1.2 km	MPC · JPL
774017	2000 OP_{64}	—	July 31, 2000	Cerro Tololo	Deep Ecliptic Survey	·	1.1 km	MPC · JPL
774018	2000 OA_{72}	—	January 4, 2016	Haleakala	Pan-STARRS 1	·	1.2 km	MPC · JPL
774019	2000 OR_{73}	—	July 31, 2000	Cerro Tololo	Deep Ecliptic Survey	·	2.5 km	MPC · JPL
774020	2000 OX_{73}	—	July 29, 2000	Cerro Tololo	Deep Ecliptic Survey	EOS	1.2 km	MPC · JPL
774021	2000 PX_{30}	—	November 27, 2014	Haleakala	Pan-STARRS 1	·	1.1 km	MPC · JPL
774022	2000 QU_{69}	—	August 30, 2000	Kitt Peak	Spacewatch	·	1.2 km	MPC · JPL
774023	2000 QS_{235}	—	August 26, 2000	Cerro Tololo	Deep Ecliptic Survey	·	610 m	MPC · JPL
774024	2000 QU_{237}	—	August 27, 2000	Cerro Tololo	Deep Ecliptic Survey	·	1.3 km	MPC · JPL
774025	2000 QW_{237}	—	August 27, 2000	Cerro Tololo	Deep Ecliptic Survey	·	1.8 km	MPC · JPL
774026	2000 QY_{238}	—	August 25, 2000	Cerro Tololo	Deep Ecliptic Survey	·	1.3 km	MPC · JPL
774027	2000 QB_{240}	—	August 25, 2000	Cerro Tololo	Deep Ecliptic Survey	·	1.0 km	MPC · JPL
774028	2000 QS_{242}	—	August 27, 2000	Cerro Tololo	Deep Ecliptic Survey	·	1.2 km	MPC · JPL
774029	2000 QO_{246}	—	August 30, 2000	Kitt Peak	Spacewatch	·	1.0 km	MPC · JPL
774030	2000 QG_{248}	—	August 31, 2000	Kitt Peak	Spacewatch	·	1.2 km	MPC · JPL
774031	2000 QX_{256}	—	October 3, 2013	Haleakala	Pan-STARRS 1	·	800 m	MPC · JPL
774032	2000 QB_{258}	—	March 29, 2012	Mount Lemmon	Mount Lemmon Survey	·	1.2 km	MPC · JPL
774033	2000 QZ_{260}	—	January 3, 2016	Haleakala	Pan-STARRS 1	·	1.0 km	MPC · JPL
774034	2000 QB_{261}	—	October 24, 2013	Mount Lemmon	Mount Lemmon Survey	·	760 m	MPC · JPL
774035	2000 RZ_{107}	—	January 13, 2016	Haleakala	Pan-STARRS 1	·	1.4 km	MPC · JPL
774036	2000 RT_{108}	—	September 5, 2016	Mount Lemmon	Mount Lemmon Survey	·	1.5 km	MPC · JPL
774037	2000 RM_{109}	—	March 28, 2015	Haleakala	Pan-STARRS 1	·	1.9 km	MPC · JPL
774038	2000 RE_{110}	—	March 23, 2012	Mount Lemmon	Mount Lemmon Survey	·	1.1 km	MPC · JPL
774039	2000 SQ_{378}	—	January 10, 2008	Kitt Peak	Spacewatch	(31811)	2.1 km	MPC · JPL
774040	2000 SX_{378}	—	December 28, 2005	Mount Lemmon	Mount Lemmon Survey	·	1.4 km	MPC · JPL
774041	2000 SN_{381}	—	January 28, 2015	Haleakala	Pan-STARRS 1	·	2.4 km	MPC · JPL
774042	2000 ST_{383}	—	July 12, 2016	Haleakala	Pan-STARRS 1	(5)	1.0 km	MPC · JPL
774043	2000 SU_{383}	—	January 18, 2008	Kitt Peak	Spacewatch	·	1.9 km	MPC · JPL
774044	2000 SV_{383}	—	February 28, 2014	Haleakala	Pan-STARRS 1	·	2.0 km	MPC · JPL
774045	2000 SX_{383}	—	September 28, 2009	Mount Lemmon	Mount Lemmon Survey	EUN	930 m	MPC · JPL
774046	2000 SY_{383}	—	April 28, 2017	Haleakala	Pan-STARRS 1	·	1.5 km	MPC · JPL
774047	2000 SC_{384}	—	April 6, 2008	Mount Lemmon	Mount Lemmon Survey	·	1.3 km	MPC · JPL
774048	2000 SB_{386}	—	January 4, 2014	Haleakala	Pan-STARRS 1	·	2.5 km	MPC · JPL
774049	2000 SJ_{386}	—	September 16, 2017	Haleakala	Pan-STARRS 1	VER	1.8 km	MPC · JPL
774050	2000 SE_{387}	—	September 29, 2000	Kitt Peak	Spacewatch	L5	7.0 km	MPC · JPL
774051	2000 TC_{77}	—	October 5, 2013	Kitt Peak	Spacewatch	EUN	1.0 km	MPC · JPL
774052	2000 TU_{77}	—	June 20, 2015	Haleakala	Pan-STARRS 1	·	2.1 km	MPC · JPL
774053	2000 TM_{78}	—	February 26, 2014	Haleakala	Pan-STARRS 1	·	2.5 km	MPC · JPL
774054	2000 TP_{78}	—	March 10, 2016	Haleakala	Pan-STARRS 1	T_{j} (2.99) · EUP	2.1 km	MPC · JPL
774055	2000 TL_{79}	—	November 20, 2014	Haleakala	Pan-STARRS 1	MRX	800 m	MPC · JPL
774056	2000 TN_{80}	—	February 28, 2014	Haleakala	Pan-STARRS 1	·	680 m	MPC · JPL
774057	2000 TL_{82}	—	October 2, 2000	Kitt Peak	Spacewatch	·	1.7 km	MPC · JPL
774058	2000 VA_{66}	—	April 30, 2016	Haleakala	Pan-STARRS 1	ADE	1.1 km	MPC · JPL
774059	2000 WE_{53}	—	November 27, 2000	Kitt Peak	Spacewatch	·	1.6 km	MPC · JPL
774060	2000 WP_{156}	—	November 19, 2000	Socorro	LINEAR	·	1.9 km	MPC · JPL
774061	2000 WT_{201}	—	August 2, 2016	Haleakala	Pan-STARRS 1	EUP	2.5 km	MPC · JPL
774062	2000 WD_{202}	—	January 19, 2013	Mount Lemmon	Mount Lemmon Survey	ELF	2.4 km	MPC · JPL
774063	2000 WC_{204}	—	October 27, 2017	Mount Lemmon	Mount Lemmon Survey	·	1.1 km	MPC · JPL
774064	2000 WH_{204}	—	September 13, 2013	Kitt Peak	Spacewatch	·	1.2 km	MPC · JPL
774065	2000 WO_{204}	—	August 20, 2014	Haleakala	Pan-STARRS 1	KOR	1.0 km	MPC · JPL
774066	2000 XE_{56}	—	May 22, 2015	Haleakala	Pan-STARRS 1	VER	1.8 km	MPC · JPL
774067	2000 YB_{141}	—	December 19, 2000	Kitt Peak	Deep Lens Survey	L4	4.9 km	MPC · JPL
774068	2000 YC_{141}	—	December 19, 2000	Kitt Peak	Deep Lens Survey	·	2.1 km	MPC · JPL
774069	2000 YA_{146}	—	November 26, 2014	Haleakala	Pan-STARRS 1	·	1.6 km	MPC · JPL
774070	2001 CE_{51}	—	February 2, 2001	Kitt Peak	Spacewatch	·	2.2 km	MPC · JPL
774071	2001 DZ_{1}	—	February 16, 2001	Kitt Peak	Spacewatch	·	1.4 km	MPC · JPL
774072	2001 DM_{84}	—	February 23, 2001	Cerro Tololo	Deep Lens Survey	·	1.1 km	MPC · JPL
774073	2001 DT_{115}	—	April 18, 2012	Mount Lemmon	Mount Lemmon Survey	EOS	1.4 km	MPC · JPL
774074	2001 DD_{118}	—	March 18, 2018	Haleakala	Pan-STARRS 1	EUN	810 m	MPC · JPL
774075	2001 DE_{119}	—	February 11, 2018	Haleakala	Pan-STARRS 1	EUN	740 m	MPC · JPL
774076	2001 DD_{120}	—	February 15, 2013	Haleakala	Pan-STARRS 1	L4 · ERY	5.8 km	MPC · JPL
774077	2001 DE_{120}	—	March 4, 2013	Haleakala	Pan-STARRS 1	·	2.6 km	MPC · JPL
774078	2001 FT_{173}	—	March 21, 2001	Kitt Peak	Spacewatch	·	1.2 km	MPC · JPL
774079	2001 FO_{181}	—	March 21, 2001	Kitt Peak	Spacewatch	·	1.1 km	MPC · JPL
774080	2001 FQ_{209}	—	March 21, 2001	Kitt Peak	SKADS	(5)	990 m	MPC · JPL
774081	2001 FJ_{211}	—	February 23, 2009	Calar Alto	F. Hormuth	·	660 m	MPC · JPL
774082	2001 FH_{228}	—	March 23, 2001	Kitt Peak	SKADS	·	1.8 km	MPC · JPL
774083	2001 FW_{238}	—	March 22, 2001	Kitt Peak	SKADS	·	1.2 km	MPC · JPL
774084	2001 FM_{239}	—	March 26, 2001	Kitt Peak	Deep Ecliptic Survey	·	1.1 km	MPC · JPL
774085	2001 FA_{247}	—	July 14, 2013	Haleakala	Pan-STARRS 1	·	1.7 km	MPC · JPL
774086	2001 FQ_{247}	—	April 14, 2010	Mount Lemmon	Mount Lemmon Survey	·	1.3 km	MPC · JPL
774087	2001 FE_{248}	—	March 24, 2001	Kitt Peak	Spacewatch	·	620 m	MPC · JPL
774088	2001 FJ_{248}	—	February 5, 2016	Haleakala	Pan-STARRS 1	EOS	1.2 km	MPC · JPL
774089	2001 GD_{12}	—	June 17, 2014	Mount Lemmon	Mount Lemmon Survey	·	940 m	MPC · JPL
774090	2001 HY_{69}	—	November 7, 2015	Mount Lemmon	Mount Lemmon Survey	·	860 m	MPC · JPL
774091	2001 HD_{70}	—	March 3, 2009	Kitt Peak	Spacewatch	·	1.0 km	MPC · JPL
774092	2001 HN_{70}	—	September 9, 2015	Haleakala	Pan-STARRS 1	·	960 m	MPC · JPL
774093	2001 HR_{70}	—	July 23, 2015	Haleakala	Pan-STARRS 1	·	1.2 km	MPC · JPL
774094	2001 KA_{82}	—	January 11, 2008	Kitt Peak	Spacewatch	·	1.1 km	MPC · JPL
774095	2001 KK_{82}	—	June 14, 2012	Mount Lemmon	Mount Lemmon Survey	·	2.1 km	MPC · JPL
774096	2001 KE_{86}	—	December 27, 2006	Mount Lemmon	Mount Lemmon Survey	(5)	980 m	MPC · JPL
774097	2001 KZ_{88}	—	September 5, 2008	Kitt Peak	Spacewatch	·	1.6 km	MPC · JPL
774098	2001 KB_{89}	—	October 24, 2003	Kitt Peak	Spacewatch	·	1.5 km	MPC · JPL
774099	2001 LT_{20}	—	April 28, 2017	Haleakala	Pan-STARRS 1	EOS	1.4 km	MPC · JPL
774100	2001 LV_{20}	—	March 19, 2013	Haleakala	Pan-STARRS 1	·	1.3 km	MPC · JPL

== 774101–774200 ==
back to top

Designation			Discovery			Properties		Ref
Permanent	Provisional	Named after	Date	Site	Discoverer(s)	Category	Diam.	Ref
774101	2001 MF_{32}	—	July 8, 2014	Haleakala	Pan-STARRS 1	·	1.0 km	MPC · JPL
774102	2001 QV_{302}	—	August 19, 2001	Cerro Tololo	Deep Ecliptic Survey	3:2	4.5 km	MPC · JPL
774103	2001 QZ_{304}	—	August 19, 2001	Cerro Tololo	Deep Ecliptic Survey	EOS	1.4 km	MPC · JPL
774104	2001 QV_{312}	—	August 20, 2001	Cerro Tololo	Deep Ecliptic Survey	·	1.4 km	MPC · JPL
774105	2001 QC_{316}	—	August 20, 2001	Cerro Tololo	Deep Ecliptic Survey	·	1.7 km	MPC · JPL
774106	2001 QX_{316}	—	August 20, 2001	Cerro Tololo	Deep Ecliptic Survey	T_{j} (2.92)	1.8 km	MPC · JPL
774107	2001 QB_{317}	—	August 20, 2001	Cerro Tololo	Deep Ecliptic Survey	·	2.3 km	MPC · JPL
774108	2001 QT_{321}	—	August 20, 2001	Cerro Tololo	Deep Ecliptic Survey	·	1.2 km	MPC · JPL
774109	2001 QG_{322}	—	August 20, 2001	Cerro Tololo	Deep Ecliptic Survey	·	1.0 km	MPC · JPL
774110	2001 QP_{336}	—	February 8, 2008	Kitt Peak	Spacewatch	BAR	1.0 km	MPC · JPL
774111	2001 QD_{338}	—	March 25, 2017	Mount Lemmon	Mount Lemmon Survey	·	1.2 km	MPC · JPL
774112	2001 QS_{338}	—	October 15, 2015	Haleakala	Pan-STARRS 1	NEM	1.5 km	MPC · JPL
774113	2001 RB_{157}	—	February 8, 2008	Kitt Peak	Spacewatch	MIS	1.9 km	MPC · JPL
774114	2001 SH_{91}	—	September 20, 2001	Socorro	LINEAR	HYG	2.6 km	MPC · JPL
774115	2001 SW_{336}	—	September 20, 2001	Socorro	LINEAR	THB	1.8 km	MPC · JPL
774116	2001 SW_{358}	—	October 30, 2010	Kitt Peak	Spacewatch	·	1.3 km	MPC · JPL
774117	2001 ST_{359}	—	September 20, 2001	Kitt Peak	Spacewatch	·	2.1 km	MPC · JPL
774118	2001 SK_{361}	—	September 18, 2010	Mount Lemmon	Mount Lemmon Survey	·	1.0 km	MPC · JPL
774119	2001 SG_{362}	—	September 24, 2014	Mount Lemmon	Mount Lemmon Survey	EUN	870 m	MPC · JPL
774120	2001 SD_{363}	—	October 2, 2015	Mount Lemmon	Mount Lemmon Survey	AGN	770 m	MPC · JPL
774121	2001 SL_{364}	—	September 23, 2001	Kitt Peak	Spacewatch	·	1.5 km	MPC · JPL
774122	2001 TS_{162}	—	September 11, 2001	Kitt Peak	Spacewatch	·	1.3 km	MPC · JPL
774123	2001 TM_{266}	—	July 4, 2014	Haleakala	Pan-STARRS 1	·	1.5 km	MPC · JPL
774124	2001 TQ_{266}	—	September 18, 2010	Mount Lemmon	Mount Lemmon Survey	·	1.1 km	MPC · JPL
774125	2001 TF_{267}	—	April 5, 2016	Haleakala	Pan-STARRS 1	·	2.1 km	MPC · JPL
774126	2001 TZ_{267}	—	March 8, 2013	Haleakala	Pan-STARRS 1	·	1.5 km	MPC · JPL
774127	2001 UL_{194}	—	October 14, 2001	Kitt Peak	Spacewatch	·	670 m	MPC · JPL
774128	2001 UH_{210}	—	September 19, 2001	Kitt Peak	Spacewatch	·	1.8 km	MPC · JPL
774129	2001 UE_{237}	—	November 21, 2015	Mount Lemmon	Mount Lemmon Survey	AEO	860 m	MPC · JPL
774130	2001 UX_{237}	—	November 7, 2015	Haleakala	Pan-STARRS 1	HOF	1.8 km	MPC · JPL
774131	2001 UT_{239}	—	October 25, 2012	Kitt Peak	Spacewatch	THM	1.9 km	MPC · JPL
774132	2001 UK_{241}	—	October 25, 2001	Apache Point	SDSS	·	1.9 km	MPC · JPL
774133	2001 VW_{136}	—	January 4, 2016	Haleakala	Pan-STARRS 1	·	1.3 km	MPC · JPL
774134	2001 VY_{136}	—	July 8, 2014	Haleakala	Pan-STARRS 1	·	1.2 km	MPC · JPL
774135	2001 VE_{137}	—	September 19, 2014	Haleakala	Pan-STARRS 1	·	1.2 km	MPC · JPL
774136	2001 VC_{138}	—	August 28, 2014	Haleakala	Pan-STARRS 1	·	1.3 km	MPC · JPL
774137	2001 VP_{138}	—	November 11, 2001	Apache Point	SDSS	·	1.1 km	MPC · JPL
774138	2001 WG_{22}	—	November 16, 2001	Kitt Peak	Deep Lens Survey	·	1.4 km	MPC · JPL
774139	2001 WV_{22}	—	November 17, 2001	Kitt Peak	Deep Lens Survey	EOS	1.2 km	MPC · JPL
774140	2001 WC_{54}	—	November 19, 2001	Socorro	LINEAR	·	2.4 km	MPC · JPL
774141	2001 WR_{72}	—	November 20, 2001	Socorro	LINEAR	·	2.1 km	MPC · JPL
774142	2001 WM_{106}	—	July 30, 2014	Haleakala	Pan-STARRS 1	·	1.2 km	MPC · JPL
774143	2001 WK_{107}	—	October 21, 2012	Haleakala	Pan-STARRS 1	·	2.1 km	MPC · JPL
774144	2001 WM_{107}	—	October 23, 2012	Mount Lemmon	Mount Lemmon Survey	·	2.1 km	MPC · JPL
774145	2001 XJ_{161}	—	December 14, 2001	Socorro	LINEAR	TIR	2.2 km	MPC · JPL
774146	2001 XT_{224}	—	November 19, 2001	Socorro	LINEAR	·	1.2 km	MPC · JPL
774147	2001 YH_{30}	—	December 18, 2001	Socorro	LINEAR	·	2.1 km	MPC · JPL
774148	2001 YP_{142}	—	December 17, 2001	Socorro	LINEAR	·	1.3 km	MPC · JPL
774149	2001 YE_{164}	—	September 16, 2017	Haleakala	Pan-STARRS 1	·	2.2 km	MPC · JPL
774150	2001 YH_{164}	—	December 20, 2001	Kitt Peak	Spacewatch	HYG	1.9 km	MPC · JPL
774151	2001 YG_{165}	—	January 18, 2015	Haleakala	Pan-STARRS 1	·	980 m	MPC · JPL
774152	2002 AO_{21}	—	January 5, 2002	Kitt Peak	Spacewatch	·	1.2 km	MPC · JPL
774153	2002 AS_{212}	—	July 26, 2011	Haleakala	Pan-STARRS 1	(895)	2.9 km	MPC · JPL
774154	2002 AC_{213}	—	February 14, 2008	Mount Lemmon	Mount Lemmon Survey	URS	2.5 km	MPC · JPL
774155	2002 AO_{214}	—	December 5, 2007	Kitt Peak	Spacewatch	·	2.5 km	MPC · JPL
774156	2002 AN_{215}	—	October 27, 2017	Haleakala	Pan-STARRS 1	·	2.4 km	MPC · JPL
774157	2002 AP_{215}	—	December 31, 2013	Kitt Peak	Spacewatch	·	2.6 km	MPC · JPL
774158	2002 AD_{216}	—	December 23, 2012	Haleakala	Pan-STARRS 1	·	1.9 km	MPC · JPL
774159	2002 AW_{216}	—	November 10, 2009	Kitt Peak	Spacewatch	·	820 m	MPC · JPL
774160	2002 AY_{216}	—	July 29, 2014	Haleakala	Pan-STARRS 1	·	1.6 km	MPC · JPL
774161	2002 CZ_{179}	—	February 7, 2002	Kitt Peak	Spacewatch	(5)	840 m	MPC · JPL
774162	2002 CA_{192}	—	February 10, 2002	Socorro	LINEAR	·	1 km	MPC · JPL
774163	2002 CM_{258}	—	February 8, 2002	Kitt Peak	Spacewatch	·	1.2 km	MPC · JPL
774164	2002 CO_{258}	—	February 8, 2002	Kitt Peak	Spacewatch	·	1.9 km	MPC · JPL
774165	2002 CL_{310}	—	February 11, 2002	Socorro	LINEAR	·	1.1 km	MPC · JPL
774166	2002 CU_{322}	—	January 9, 2013	Mount Lemmon	Mount Lemmon Survey	·	2.5 km	MPC · JPL
774167	2002 CW_{324}	—	August 27, 2009	Kitt Peak	Spacewatch	KOR	970 m	MPC · JPL
774168	2002 CZ_{324}	—	July 31, 2014	Haleakala	Pan-STARRS 1	·	1.4 km	MPC · JPL
774169	2002 CW_{327}	—	July 10, 2018	Haleakala	Pan-STARRS 1	KOR	1.0 km	MPC · JPL
774170	2002 CX_{327}	—	October 4, 2014	Kitt Peak	Spacewatch	AGN	840 m	MPC · JPL
774171	2002 CW_{328}	—	January 17, 2013	Haleakala	Pan-STARRS 1	L4	6.2 km	MPC · JPL
774172	2002 CR_{329}	—	February 7, 2002	Kitt Peak	Spacewatch	·	2.0 km	MPC · JPL
774173	2002 EE_{7}	—	March 6, 2002	Siding Spring	R. H. McNaught	T_{j} (2.99)	2.9 km	MPC · JPL
774174	2002 EO_{36}	—	March 9, 2002	Kitt Peak	Spacewatch	·	1.3 km	MPC · JPL
774175	2002 EV_{171}	—	October 29, 2017	Mount Lemmon	Mount Lemmon Survey	·	2.2 km	MPC · JPL
774176	2002 EW_{171}	—	February 12, 2008	Mount Lemmon	Mount Lemmon Survey	·	2.3 km	MPC · JPL
774177	2002 ED_{172}	—	February 8, 2011	Mount Lemmon	Mount Lemmon Survey	·	1.3 km	MPC · JPL
774178	2002 FG_{14}	—	March 16, 2002	Kitt Peak	Spacewatch	KOR	990 m	MPC · JPL
774179	2002 FP_{43}	—	September 12, 2007	Mount Lemmon	Mount Lemmon Survey	·	760 m	MPC · JPL
774180	2002 GK_{29}	—	April 7, 2002	Cerro Tololo	Deep Ecliptic Survey	·	990 m	MPC · JPL
774181	2002 GX_{29}	—	April 7, 2002	Cerro Tololo	Deep Ecliptic Survey	·	2.3 km	MPC · JPL
774182	2002 GP_{196}	—	January 3, 2016	Haleakala	Pan-STARRS 1	KOR	1.0 km	MPC · JPL
774183	2002 JB_{3}	—	May 4, 2002	Kitt Peak	Spacewatch	·	620 m	MPC · JPL
774184	2002 JF_{142}	—	May 11, 2002	Socorro	LINEAR	BRG	1.3 km	MPC · JPL
774185	2002 JS_{153}	—	May 7, 2010	Mount Lemmon	Mount Lemmon Survey	3:2	3.7 km	MPC · JPL
774186	2002 LG_{66}	—	August 26, 2013	Haleakala	Pan-STARRS 1	·	1.6 km	MPC · JPL
774187	2002 MB_{7}	—	December 5, 2007	Kitt Peak	Spacewatch	·	1.3 km	MPC · JPL
774188	2002 NO_{65}	—	October 10, 2002	Apache Point	SDSS	MAR	1.1 km	MPC · JPL
774189	2002 NY_{68}	—	August 15, 2002	Kitt Peak	Spacewatch	·	950 m	MPC · JPL
774190	2002 NC_{84}	—	July 8, 2018	Haleakala	Pan-STARRS 1	·	2.0 km	MPC · JPL
774191	2002 OL_{32}	—	July 17, 2002	Palomar	NEAT	·	1.1 km	MPC · JPL
774192	2002 PO_{142}	—	March 27, 2012	Mount Lemmon	Mount Lemmon Survey	·	2.0 km	MPC · JPL
774193	2002 PC_{150}	—	August 11, 2002	Cerro Tololo	Deep Ecliptic Survey	·	1.2 km	MPC · JPL
774194	2002 PS_{196}	—	August 14, 2002	Kitt Peak	Spacewatch	·	850 m	MPC · JPL
774195	2002 PK_{205}	—	March 5, 2013	Mount Lemmon	Mount Lemmon Survey	MAR	820 m	MPC · JPL
774196	2002 PT_{205}	—	August 8, 2018	Haleakala	Pan-STARRS 1	·	1.3 km	MPC · JPL
774197	2002 PA_{206}	—	December 9, 2015	Kitt Peak	Spacewatch	·	1.0 km	MPC · JPL
774198	2002 QA_{56}	—	September 6, 2002	Socorro	LINEAR	·	1.3 km	MPC · JPL
774199	2002 QT_{123}	—	August 29, 2002	Palomar	NEAT	·	940 m	MPC · JPL
774200	2002 QP_{159}	—	September 9, 2015	Haleakala	Pan-STARRS 1	·	930 m	MPC · JPL

== 774201–774300 ==
back to top

Designation			Discovery			Properties		Ref
Permanent	Provisional	Named after	Date	Site	Discoverer(s)	Category	Diam.	Ref
774201	2002 QS_{159}	—	December 18, 2007	Mount Lemmon	Mount Lemmon Survey	·	1.0 km	MPC · JPL
774202	2002 QF_{160}	—	October 20, 2011	Mount Lemmon	Mount Lemmon Survey	·	1.1 km	MPC · JPL
774203	2002 QG_{160}	—	September 12, 2015	Haleakala	Pan-STARRS 1	·	880 m	MPC · JPL
774204	2002 RG_{249}	—	October 5, 2002	Apache Point	SDSS	·	860 m	MPC · JPL
774205	2002 RW_{258}	—	September 5, 2002	Apache Point	SDSS	·	1.3 km	MPC · JPL
774206	2002 RQ_{285}	—	September 23, 2008	Kitt Peak	Spacewatch	·	2.3 km	MPC · JPL
774207	2002 RN_{286}	—	September 11, 2002	Palomar	NEAT	RAF	730 m	MPC · JPL
774208	2002 RZ_{290}	—	September 9, 2002	Palomar	NEAT	·	1.2 km	MPC · JPL
774209	2002 RJ_{300}	—	September 6, 2015	Haleakala	Pan-STARRS 1	EUN	1.0 km	MPC · JPL
774210	2002 RO_{300}	—	October 23, 2011	Kitt Peak	Spacewatch	·	1.1 km	MPC · JPL
774211	2002 RC_{301}	—	December 14, 2015	Mount Lemmon	Mount Lemmon Survey	EUN	910 m	MPC · JPL
774212	2002 TH_{21}	—	October 2, 2002	Socorro	LINEAR	·	990 m	MPC · JPL
774213	2002 TS_{383}	—	October 5, 2002	Apache Point	SDSS	·	1.7 km	MPC · JPL
774214	2002 TP_{390}	—	July 23, 2015	Haleakala	Pan-STARRS 1	·	1.5 km	MPC · JPL
774215	2002 TW_{390}	—	October 2, 2013	Mount Lemmon	Mount Lemmon Survey	·	2.0 km	MPC · JPL
774216	2002 TE_{392}	—	November 21, 2015	Mount Lemmon	Mount Lemmon Survey	·	970 m	MPC · JPL
774217	2002 TF_{392}	—	March 15, 2008	Mount Lemmon	Mount Lemmon Survey	·	1.1 km	MPC · JPL
774218	2002 TK_{392}	—	October 24, 2015	Mount Lemmon	Mount Lemmon Survey	·	1.1 km	MPC · JPL
774219	2002 TL_{393}	—	September 12, 2015	Haleakala	Pan-STARRS 1	·	1.1 km	MPC · JPL
774220	2002 TS_{393}	—	December 30, 2011	Kitt Peak	Spacewatch	(5)	980 m	MPC · JPL
774221	2002 TL_{394}	—	September 26, 2006	Mount Lemmon	Mount Lemmon Survey	(5)	880 m	MPC · JPL
774222	2002 UE_{76}	—	October 31, 2002	Apache Point	SDSS	·	1.5 km	MPC · JPL
774223	2002 UU_{79}	—	May 13, 2021	Haleakala	Pan-STARRS 1	EOS	1.2 km	MPC · JPL
774224	2002 UF_{81}	—	October 26, 2011	Haleakala	Pan-STARRS 1	·	1.2 km	MPC · JPL
774225	2002 VH_{2}	—	November 3, 2002	Wrightwood	J. W. Young	·	1.1 km	MPC · JPL
774226	2002 VL_{6}	—	November 5, 2002	La Palma	A. Fitzsimmons	·	1.7 km	MPC · JPL
774227	2002 VU_{42}	—	November 3, 2002	Haleakala	NEAT	·	1.9 km	MPC · JPL
774228	2002 VU_{90}	—	October 11, 2002	Kitt Peak	Spacewatch	·	1.3 km	MPC · JPL
774229	2002 VX_{151}	—	December 8, 2015	Mount Lemmon	Mount Lemmon Survey	MIS	1.9 km	MPC · JPL
774230	2002 VQ_{152}	—	January 30, 2012	Mount Lemmon	Mount Lemmon Survey	·	870 m	MPC · JPL
774231	2002 XQ_{120}	—	October 8, 2007	Catalina	CSS	·	2.2 km	MPC · JPL
774232	2002 XZ_{120}	—	December 10, 2002	Palomar	NEAT	·	2.0 km	MPC · JPL
774233	2002 XM_{123}	—	January 20, 2015	Mount Lemmon	Mount Lemmon Survey	VER	1.9 km	MPC · JPL
774234	2003 AE_{71}	—	January 10, 2003	Kitt Peak	Spacewatch	·	1.7 km	MPC · JPL
774235	2003 AT_{95}	—	January 4, 2003	Kitt Peak	Spacewatch	·	1.8 km	MPC · JPL
774236	2003 BY_{92}	—	January 28, 2020	Mount Lemmon	Mount Lemmon Survey	·	2.4 km	MPC · JPL
774237	2003 BL_{97}	—	July 25, 2011	Haleakala	Pan-STARRS 1	·	1.6 km	MPC · JPL
774238	2003 BA_{98}	—	September 25, 2012	Kitt Peak	Spacewatch	(31811)	1.9 km	MPC · JPL
774239	2003 BU_{99}	—	September 9, 2015	Haleakala	Pan-STARRS 1	JUN	760 m	MPC · JPL
774240	2003 BM_{101}	—	February 10, 2014	Haleakala	Pan-STARRS 1	EOS	1.3 km	MPC · JPL
774241	2003 BJ_{102}	—	July 4, 2016	Haleakala	Pan-STARRS 1	·	2.4 km	MPC · JPL
774242	2003 CS_{22}	—	February 7, 2003	La Silla	Barbieri, C.	THM	1.6 km	MPC · JPL
774243	2003 CP_{23}	—	February 4, 2003	La Silla	Barbieri, C.	·	1.7 km	MPC · JPL
774244	2003 CD_{28}	—	September 12, 2018	Mount Lemmon	Mount Lemmon Survey	·	2.0 km	MPC · JPL
774245	2003 DV_{25}	—	May 23, 2015	Cerro Tololo	DECam	·	1.5 km	MPC · JPL
774246	2003 EN_{54}	—	March 7, 2003	Kitt Peak	Deep Lens Survey	·	2.2 km	MPC · JPL
774247	2003 EB_{65}	—	August 18, 2017	Haleakala	Pan-STARRS 1	·	890 m	MPC · JPL
774248	2003 FL_{2}	—	March 23, 2003	Ondřejov	L. Kotková	TIR	2.3 km	MPC · JPL
774249	2003 FE_{13}	—	March 23, 2003	Kitt Peak	Spacewatch	·	1.8 km	MPC · JPL
774250	2003 FY_{123}	—	March 12, 2003	Kitt Peak	Spacewatch	·	1.8 km	MPC · JPL
774251	2003 FK_{137}	—	March 23, 2003	Apache Point	SDSS	GAL	1.3 km	MPC · JPL
774252	2003 GO_{56}	—	April 10, 2003	Kitt Peak	Spacewatch	·	2.3 km	MPC · JPL
774253	2003 GM_{57}	—	March 21, 2020	Haleakala	Pan-STARRS 1	·	2.0 km	MPC · JPL
774254	2003 GH_{63}	—	October 18, 2009	Mount Lemmon	Mount Lemmon Survey	·	1.2 km	MPC · JPL
774255	2003 GY_{63}	—	November 7, 2012	Haleakala	Pan-STARRS 1	·	1.7 km	MPC · JPL
774256	2003 GD_{66}	—	April 5, 2003	Kitt Peak	Spacewatch	·	2.4 km	MPC · JPL
774257	2003 GE_{66}	—	April 7, 2003	Kitt Peak	Spacewatch	·	2.0 km	MPC · JPL
774258	2003 HG_{62}	—	April 14, 2016	Haleakala	Pan-STARRS 1	·	1.1 km	MPC · JPL
774259	2003 HC_{64}	—	April 26, 2003	Kitt Peak	Spacewatch	3:2 · SHU	4.1 km	MPC · JPL
774260	2003 HY_{65}	—	January 9, 2019	Haleakala	Pan-STARRS 1	·	1.9 km	MPC · JPL
774261	2003 JA_{11}	—	April 5, 2003	Kitt Peak	Spacewatch	·	2.9 km	MPC · JPL
774262	2003 JN_{18}	—	May 3, 2003	Kitt Peak	Spacewatch	·	2.5 km	MPC · JPL
774263	2003 KK_{20}	—	May 31, 2003	Kitt Peak	Spacewatch	T_{j} (2.97)	1.7 km	MPC · JPL
774264	2003 KW_{20}	—	May 30, 2003	Cerro Tololo	Deep Ecliptic Survey	KOR	1.1 km	MPC · JPL
774265	2003 KC_{27}	—	May 31, 2003	Cerro Tololo	Deep Ecliptic Survey	·	770 m	MPC · JPL
774266	2003 KR_{37}	—	July 15, 2013	Haleakala	Pan-STARRS 1	·	1.6 km	MPC · JPL
774267	2003 KF_{38}	—	April 1, 2016	Haleakala	Pan-STARRS 1	·	1.5 km	MPC · JPL
774268	2003 KA_{40}	—	August 25, 2014	Haleakala	Pan-STARRS 1	·	1.7 km	MPC · JPL
774269	2003 KC_{40}	—	January 12, 2016	Haleakala	Pan-STARRS 1	·	1.3 km	MPC · JPL
774270	2003 LZ_{10}	—	April 3, 2008	Kitt Peak	Spacewatch	·	1.7 km	MPC · JPL
774271	2003 NM_{5}	—	July 6, 2003	Mount Graham	Ryan, W., Martinez, C.	·	2.3 km	MPC · JPL
774272	2003 QS_{31}	—	August 4, 2003	Kitt Peak	Spacewatch	·	960 m	MPC · JPL
774273	2003 QM_{97}	—	August 30, 2003	Kitt Peak	Spacewatch	KOR	1.0 km	MPC · JPL
774274	2003 QC_{98}	—	August 30, 2003	Kitt Peak	Spacewatch	·	1.0 km	MPC · JPL
774275	2003 QG_{121}	—	October 10, 1999	Kitt Peak	Spacewatch	·	1.0 km	MPC · JPL
774276	2003 QK_{121}	—	November 26, 2012	Mount Lemmon	Mount Lemmon Survey	·	870 m	MPC · JPL
774277	2003 QQ_{121}	—	October 22, 2012	Kitt Peak	Spacewatch	·	960 m	MPC · JPL
774278	2003 QP_{124}	—	August 25, 2003	Cerro Tololo	Deep Ecliptic Survey	KOR	1.1 km	MPC · JPL
774279	2003 QV_{124}	—	January 18, 2015	Mount Lemmon	Mount Lemmon Survey	HOF	1.7 km	MPC · JPL
774280	2003 QQ_{125}	—	March 15, 2021	Haleakala	Pan-STARRS 1	KOR	890 m	MPC · JPL
774281	2003 QM_{126}	—	February 16, 2012	Haleakala	Pan-STARRS 1	THM	1.7 km	MPC · JPL
774282	2003 RR_{28}	—	September 4, 2003	Kitt Peak	Spacewatch	·	790 m	MPC · JPL
774283	2003 SV_{8}	—	September 17, 2003	Kitt Peak	Spacewatch	·	660 m	MPC · JPL
774284	2003 SB_{80}	—	September 19, 2003	Kitt Peak	Spacewatch	·	850 m	MPC · JPL
774285	2003 SF_{239}	—	September 18, 2003	Kitt Peak	Spacewatch	GEF	730 m	MPC · JPL
774286	2003 SQ_{239}	—	September 18, 2003	Kitt Peak	Spacewatch	·	1.9 km	MPC · JPL
774287	2003 SS_{330}	—	October 2, 2003	Kitt Peak	Spacewatch	·	2.2 km	MPC · JPL
774288	2003 SS_{336}	—	October 20, 2003	Kitt Peak	Spacewatch	·	1.5 km	MPC · JPL
774289	2003 SY_{348}	—	September 18, 2003	Kitt Peak	Spacewatch	·	610 m	MPC · JPL
774290	2003 SP_{359}	—	September 21, 2003	Kitt Peak	Spacewatch	·	1.5 km	MPC · JPL
774291	2003 SG_{360}	—	September 21, 2003	Kitt Peak	Spacewatch	·	980 m	MPC · JPL
774292	2003 SW_{367}	—	September 26, 2003	Apache Point	SDSS	(5)	720 m	MPC · JPL
774293	2003 SV_{369}	—	September 27, 2003	Kitt Peak	Spacewatch	·	1 km	MPC · JPL
774294	2003 SX_{378}	—	September 28, 2003	Kitt Peak	Spacewatch	·	1.2 km	MPC · JPL
774295	2003 SU_{383}	—	September 30, 2003	Kitt Peak	Spacewatch	·	630 m	MPC · JPL
774296	2003 SH_{386}	—	September 26, 2003	Apache Point	SDSS	(5)	770 m	MPC · JPL
774297	2003 SH_{400}	—	September 26, 2003	Apache Point	SDSS	·	710 m	MPC · JPL
774298	2003 SS_{409}	—	September 28, 2003	Apache Point	SDSS	·	1.2 km	MPC · JPL
774299	2003 ST_{412}	—	September 18, 2003	Kitt Peak	Spacewatch	·	2.0 km	MPC · JPL
774300	2003 SQ_{425}	—	September 26, 2003	Apache Point	SDSS	KOR	1.2 km	MPC · JPL

== 774301–774400 ==
back to top

Designation			Discovery			Properties		Ref
Permanent	Provisional	Named after	Date	Site	Discoverer(s)	Category	Diam.	Ref
774301	2003 SS_{443}	—	September 27, 2008	Mount Lemmon	Mount Lemmon Survey	·	1.6 km	MPC · JPL
774302	2003 SY_{444}	—	September 25, 2012	Mount Lemmon	Mount Lemmon Survey	EUN	840 m	MPC · JPL
774303	2003 SB_{448}	—	September 28, 2003	Apache Point	SDSS	·	2.1 km	MPC · JPL
774304	2003 SK_{448}	—	August 31, 2011	Haleakala	Pan-STARRS 1	EUN	870 m	MPC · JPL
774305	2003 SO_{448}	—	September 21, 2003	Kitt Peak	Spacewatch	·	850 m	MPC · JPL
774306	2003 SK_{449}	—	September 19, 2003	Kitt Peak	Spacewatch	·	1.5 km	MPC · JPL
774307	2003 SQ_{452}	—	September 16, 2003	Kitt Peak	Spacewatch	3:2	3.9 km	MPC · JPL
774308	2003 SL_{454}	—	September 21, 2011	Haleakala	Pan-STARRS 1	·	820 m	MPC · JPL
774309	2003 SY_{454}	—	September 21, 2003	Kitt Peak	Spacewatch	·	1.8 km	MPC · JPL
774310	2003 SX_{458}	—	February 5, 2011	Mount Lemmon	Mount Lemmon Survey	·	1.9 km	MPC · JPL
774311	2003 SZ_{462}	—	February 8, 2016	Mount Lemmon	Mount Lemmon Survey	EOS	1.2 km	MPC · JPL
774312	2003 SB_{463}	—	September 28, 2003	Kitt Peak	Spacewatch	·	1.2 km	MPC · JPL
774313	2003 SD_{463}	—	October 15, 2012	Haleakala	Pan-STARRS 1	·	1.2 km	MPC · JPL
774314	2003 SJ_{463}	—	October 14, 2013	Mount Lemmon	Mount Lemmon Survey	·	1.4 km	MPC · JPL
774315	2003 SS_{465}	—	September 22, 2003	Kitt Peak	Spacewatch	·	950 m	MPC · JPL
774316	2003 SS_{470}	—	September 16, 2003	Kitt Peak	Spacewatch	·	920 m	MPC · JPL
774317	2003 SO_{475}	—	September 19, 2003	Kitt Peak	Spacewatch	·	1.9 km	MPC · JPL
774318	2003 SK_{476}	—	September 18, 2003	Kitt Peak	Spacewatch	·	2.7 km	MPC · JPL
774319	2003 SP_{476}	—	September 28, 2003	Kitt Peak	Spacewatch	·	1.3 km	MPC · JPL
774320	2003 TR_{1}	—	October 3, 2003	Kitt Peak	Spacewatch	BRG	1.1 km	MPC · JPL
774321	2003 TS_{32}	—	October 1, 2003	Kitt Peak	Spacewatch	·	1.4 km	MPC · JPL
774322	2003 TF_{62}	—	December 21, 2008	Kitt Peak	Spacewatch	·	1.1 km	MPC · JPL
774323	2003 TL_{64}	—	September 6, 2015	Kitt Peak	Spacewatch	·	620 m	MPC · JPL
774324	2003 UM_{44}	—	October 1, 2003	Kitt Peak	Spacewatch	·	880 m	MPC · JPL
774325	2003 UC_{84}	—	October 18, 2003	Kitt Peak	Spacewatch	MAR	720 m	MPC · JPL
774326	2003 UV_{97}	—	October 19, 2003	Kitt Peak	Spacewatch	·	1.3 km	MPC · JPL
774327	2003 UF_{114}	—	October 29, 1999	Kitt Peak	Spacewatch	·	810 m	MPC · JPL
774328	2003 US_{124}	—	October 20, 2003	Kitt Peak	Spacewatch	·	1.2 km	MPC · JPL
774329	2003 UB_{154}	—	October 19, 2003	Kitt Peak	Spacewatch	·	790 m	MPC · JPL
774330	2003 UM_{154}	—	October 20, 2003	Kitt Peak	Spacewatch	·	1.4 km	MPC · JPL
774331	2003 UN_{289}	—	October 19, 2003	Kitt Peak	Spacewatch	·	1.5 km	MPC · JPL
774332	2003 UL_{301}	—	October 17, 2003	Kitt Peak	Spacewatch	·	1.6 km	MPC · JPL
774333	2003 UG_{323}	—	September 29, 2003	Kitt Peak	Spacewatch	·	1.8 km	MPC · JPL
774334	2003 UZ_{324}	—	October 17, 2003	Apache Point	SDSS	BRA	1.1 km	MPC · JPL
774335	2003 UY_{333}	—	September 29, 2003	Kitt Peak	Spacewatch	3:2	2.9 km	MPC · JPL
774336	2003 UJ_{336}	—	October 18, 2003	Apache Point	SDSS	·	1.4 km	MPC · JPL
774337	2003 UW_{348}	—	October 19, 2003	Apache Point	SDSS	·	1.4 km	MPC · JPL
774338	2003 UN_{358}	—	October 19, 2003	Kitt Peak	Spacewatch	RAF	620 m	MPC · JPL
774339	2003 UP_{358}	—	October 19, 2003	Kitt Peak	Spacewatch	(194)	1.2 km	MPC · JPL
774340	2003 UR_{363}	—	October 20, 2003	Kitt Peak	Spacewatch	·	1.1 km	MPC · JPL
774341	2003 US_{365}	—	October 20, 2003	Kitt Peak	Spacewatch	WIT	740 m	MPC · JPL
774342	2003 UB_{371}	—	June 7, 2003	Kitt Peak	Spacewatch	·	1.2 km	MPC · JPL
774343	2003 UH_{380}	—	September 21, 2003	Kitt Peak	Spacewatch	JUN	790 m	MPC · JPL
774344	2003 UZ_{384}	—	October 22, 2003	Apache Point	SDSS	·	1.6 km	MPC · JPL
774345	2003 UW_{386}	—	October 23, 2003	Kitt Peak	Spacewatch	·	660 m	MPC · JPL
774346	2003 UQ_{389}	—	October 22, 2003	Apache Point	SDSS	MRX	770 m	MPC · JPL
774347	2003 UY_{394}	—	October 22, 2003	Apache Point	SDSS	·	1.3 km	MPC · JPL
774348	2003 UH_{399}	—	October 22, 2003	Apache Point	SDSS	·	910 m	MPC · JPL
774349	2003 UH_{424}	—	November 15, 2003	Kitt Peak	Spacewatch	KOR	1.0 km	MPC · JPL
774350	2003 UW_{425}	—	March 17, 2013	Mount Lemmon	Mount Lemmon Survey	·	820 m	MPC · JPL
774351	2003 UV_{428}	—	January 14, 2011	Mount Lemmon	Mount Lemmon Survey	·	1.3 km	MPC · JPL
774352	2003 UZ_{428}	—	January 30, 2009	Kitt Peak	Spacewatch	·	910 m	MPC · JPL
774353	2003 UO_{430}	—	December 16, 1995	Kitt Peak	Spacewatch	·	740 m	MPC · JPL
774354	2003 UV_{435}	—	September 5, 2008	Kitt Peak	Spacewatch	·	1.4 km	MPC · JPL
774355	2003 UN_{436}	—	September 20, 2011	Mount Lemmon	Mount Lemmon Survey	·	750 m	MPC · JPL
774356	2003 UR_{436}	—	October 22, 2003	Kitt Peak	Spacewatch	·	880 m	MPC · JPL
774357	2003 UA_{437}	—	October 25, 2014	Haleakala	Pan-STARRS 1	·	1.2 km	MPC · JPL
774358	2003 UN_{437}	—	August 26, 2012	Haleakala	Pan-STARRS 1	·	1.5 km	MPC · JPL
774359	2003 UR_{439}	—	July 11, 2018	Haleakala	Pan-STARRS 1	·	1.6 km	MPC · JPL
774360	2003 UV_{439}	—	February 24, 2009	Kitt Peak	Spacewatch	·	840 m	MPC · JPL
774361	2003 UE_{440}	—	April 13, 2012	Haleakala	Pan-STARRS 1	·	2.2 km	MPC · JPL
774362	2003 UL_{442}	—	October 10, 2007	Mount Lemmon	Mount Lemmon Survey	·	690 m	MPC · JPL
774363	2003 UR_{442}	—	May 10, 2015	Mount Lemmon	Mount Lemmon Survey	·	1.1 km	MPC · JPL
774364	2003 UU_{442}	—	October 19, 2003	Kitt Peak	Spacewatch	·	1.7 km	MPC · JPL
774365	2003 UW_{442}	—	April 20, 2017	Haleakala	Pan-STARRS 1	·	1.5 km	MPC · JPL
774366	2003 UC_{443}	—	February 9, 2016	Haleakala	Pan-STARRS 1	·	1.0 km	MPC · JPL
774367	2003 UE_{444}	—	October 23, 2003	Kitt Peak	Deep Ecliptic Survey	·	1.3 km	MPC · JPL
774368	2003 UA_{447}	—	October 22, 2003	Apache Point	SDSS	·	1.0 km	MPC · JPL
774369	2003 UG_{450}	—	October 29, 2003	Kitt Peak	Spacewatch	EUN	790 m	MPC · JPL
774370	2003 UE_{451}	—	October 22, 2003	Kitt Peak	Deep Ecliptic Survey	·	1.4 km	MPC · JPL
774371	2003 WW_{83}	—	November 21, 2003	Kitt Peak	Spacewatch	·	1.5 km	MPC · JPL
774372	2003 WD_{84}	—	November 21, 2003	Kitt Peak	Spacewatch	·	2.9 km	MPC · JPL
774373	2003 WW_{105}	—	January 13, 2013	Mount Lemmon	Mount Lemmon Survey	MAR	690 m	MPC · JPL
774374	2003 WE_{173}	—	November 16, 2003	Kitt Peak	Spacewatch	·	1.4 km	MPC · JPL
774375	2003 WC_{179}	—	November 20, 2003	Kitt Peak	Deep Ecliptic Survey	·	1.3 km	MPC · JPL
774376	2003 WR_{185}	—	November 21, 2003	Kitt Peak	Deep Ecliptic Survey	(5)	760 m	MPC · JPL
774377	2003 WS_{204}	—	November 20, 2003	Kitt Peak	Spacewatch	·	880 m	MPC · JPL
774378	2003 WA_{207}	—	December 1, 2003	Kitt Peak	Spacewatch	DOR	1.7 km	MPC · JPL
774379	2003 WO_{207}	—	November 20, 2003	Apache Point	SDSS	MAR	790 m	MPC · JPL
774380	2003 WR_{207}	—	May 19, 2012	Mount Lemmon	Mount Lemmon Survey	·	2.1 km	MPC · JPL
774381	2003 WC_{209}	—	November 3, 2015	Mount Lemmon	Mount Lemmon Survey	·	760 m	MPC · JPL
774382	2003 WP_{209}	—	December 16, 2014	Haleakala	Pan-STARRS 1	·	2.2 km	MPC · JPL
774383	2003 WF_{210}	—	September 29, 2008	Mount Lemmon	Mount Lemmon Survey	VER	2.1 km	MPC · JPL
774384	2003 WZ_{210}	—	January 2, 2009	Kitt Peak	Spacewatch	·	1.3 km	MPC · JPL
774385	2003 WO_{211}	—	January 27, 2017	Haleakala	Pan-STARRS 1	L5	6.5 km	MPC · JPL
774386	2003 WJ_{212}	—	April 11, 2010	Kitt Peak	Spacewatch	KON	1.4 km	MPC · JPL
774387	2003 WY_{213}	—	January 20, 2015	Haleakala	Pan-STARRS 1	·	1.1 km	MPC · JPL
774388	2003 WA_{214}	—	October 17, 2014	Mount Lemmon	Mount Lemmon Survey	·	2.6 km	MPC · JPL
774389	2003 WC_{217}	—	June 1, 2019	Haleakala	Pan-STARRS 1	·	1.1 km	MPC · JPL
774390	2003 WO_{218}	—	November 29, 2003	Kitt Peak	Spacewatch	·	1.3 km	MPC · JPL
774391	2003 XT_{44}	—	November 23, 2014	Mount Lemmon	Mount Lemmon Survey	·	2.2 km	MPC · JPL
774392	2003 XD_{45}	—	November 22, 2012	Kitt Peak	Spacewatch	·	1.4 km	MPC · JPL
774393	2003 XL_{46}	—	February 10, 2016	Haleakala	Pan-STARRS 1	·	1.8 km	MPC · JPL
774394	2003 YV_{1}	—	December 18, 2003	Socorro	LINEAR	·	1.4 km	MPC · JPL
774395	2003 YD_{53}	—	November 19, 2003	Kitt Peak	Spacewatch	·	2.1 km	MPC · JPL
774396	2003 YV_{141}	—	December 28, 2003	Socorro	LINEAR	·	1.2 km	MPC · JPL
774397	2004 BD_{86}	—	January 18, 2004	Haleakala	NEAT	·	1.4 km	MPC · JPL
774398	2004 BZ_{152}	—	November 2, 2007	Kitt Peak	Spacewatch	AGN	860 m	MPC · JPL
774399	2004 BC_{153}	—	September 9, 2015	Haleakala	Pan-STARRS 1	·	1.3 km	MPC · JPL
774400	2004 BA_{166}	—	November 7, 2007	Kitt Peak	Spacewatch	·	890 m	MPC · JPL

== 774401–774500 ==
back to top

Designation			Discovery			Properties		Ref
Permanent	Provisional	Named after	Date	Site	Discoverer(s)	Category	Diam.	Ref
774401	2004 BS_{167}	—	August 11, 2002	Cerro Tololo	Deep Ecliptic Survey	·	1.1 km	MPC · JPL
774402	2004 BV_{167}	—	October 18, 2007	Kitt Peak	Spacewatch	·	1.4 km	MPC · JPL
774403	2004 BW_{167}	—	December 29, 2014	Haleakala	Pan-STARRS 1	TIR	2.2 km	MPC · JPL
774404	2004 BN_{168}	—	April 16, 2013	Kitt Peak	Spacewatch	·	1.1 km	MPC · JPL
774405	2004 BO_{170}	—	September 24, 2011	Haleakala	Pan-STARRS 1	·	820 m	MPC · JPL
774406	2004 BV_{170}	—	October 25, 2011	Haleakala	Pan-STARRS 1	·	1.1 km	MPC · JPL
774407	2004 BA_{171}	—	February 22, 2017	Mount Lemmon	Mount Lemmon Survey	·	1.3 km	MPC · JPL
774408	2004 BH_{171}	—	January 31, 2004	Apache Point	SDSS	·	880 m	MPC · JPL
774409	2004 BJ_{171}	—	March 5, 2017	Haleakala	Pan-STARRS 1	EUN	820 m	MPC · JPL
774410	2004 BR_{173}	—	November 17, 2007	Kitt Peak	Spacewatch	·	770 m	MPC · JPL
774411	2004 BL_{174}	—	January 31, 2004	Apache Point	SDSS	·	1.2 km	MPC · JPL
774412	2004 CA_{10}	—	February 11, 2004	Kitt Peak	Spacewatch	·	820 m	MPC · JPL
774413	2004 CO_{15}	—	February 11, 2004	Kitt Peak	Spacewatch	·	940 m	MPC · JPL
774414	2004 CX_{28}	—	January 19, 2004	Kitt Peak	Spacewatch	·	1.2 km	MPC · JPL
774415	2004 CG_{33}	—	January 28, 2004	Kitt Peak	Spacewatch	·	1.0 km	MPC · JPL
774416	2004 CL_{117}	—	August 17, 2017	Haleakala	Pan-STARRS 1	·	1.5 km	MPC · JPL
774417	2004 CR_{134}	—	August 22, 2014	Haleakala	Pan-STARRS 1	·	1.0 km	MPC · JPL
774418	2004 CZ_{134}	—	January 26, 2017	Mount Lemmon	Mount Lemmon Survey	HNS	890 m	MPC · JPL
774419	2004 CR_{135}	—	April 26, 2017	Haleakala	Pan-STARRS 1	·	840 m	MPC · JPL
774420	2004 DG_{25}	—	February 19, 2004	Socorro	LINEAR	·	910 m	MPC · JPL
774421	2004 DT_{55}	—	February 12, 2004	Kitt Peak	Spacewatch	·	1.5 km	MPC · JPL
774422	2004 DZ_{68}	—	February 26, 2004	Kitt Peak	Deep Ecliptic Survey	·	970 m	MPC · JPL
774423	2004 DZ_{71}	—	February 16, 2004	Kitt Peak	Spacewatch	THM	1.9 km	MPC · JPL
774424	2004 DW_{83}	—	January 22, 2015	Haleakala	Pan-STARRS 1	·	2.1 km	MPC · JPL
774425	2004 DP_{84}	—	October 16, 2007	Mount Lemmon	Mount Lemmon Survey	·	1.9 km	MPC · JPL
774426	2004 DQ_{84}	—	December 14, 2015	Haleakala	Pan-STARRS 1	·	890 m	MPC · JPL
774427	2004 DL_{86}	—	April 23, 2009	Kitt Peak	Spacewatch	·	1.2 km	MPC · JPL
774428	2004 DG_{87}	—	February 6, 2014	Mount Lemmon	Mount Lemmon Survey	·	1.2 km	MPC · JPL
774429	2004 DR_{87}	—	February 15, 2013	Haleakala	Pan-STARRS 1	GEF	790 m	MPC · JPL
774430	2004 DT_{89}	—	February 29, 2004	Kitt Peak	Spacewatch	·	650 m	MPC · JPL
774431	2004 EJ_{26}	—	March 14, 2004	Kitt Peak	Spacewatch	·	1.2 km	MPC · JPL
774432	2004 ER_{29}	—	March 15, 2004	Kitt Peak	Spacewatch	·	1.8 km	MPC · JPL
774433	2004 ET_{29}	—	March 15, 2004	Kitt Peak	Spacewatch	·	820 m	MPC · JPL
774434	2004 EY_{29}	—	March 15, 2004	Kitt Peak	Spacewatch	·	800 m	MPC · JPL
774435	2004 EN_{44}	—	March 14, 2004	Kitt Peak	Spacewatch	·	1.3 km	MPC · JPL
774436	2004 EC_{49}	—	March 15, 2004	Kitt Peak	Spacewatch	·	1.0 km	MPC · JPL
774437	2004 ED_{85}	—	February 26, 2004	Socorro	LINEAR	·	1.4 km	MPC · JPL
774438	2004 EG_{103}	—	March 15, 2004	Kitt Peak	Spacewatch	·	1.5 km	MPC · JPL
774439	2004 ER_{106}	—	March 15, 2004	Kitt Peak	Spacewatch	·	1.5 km	MPC · JPL
774440	2004 EL_{109}	—	March 15, 2004	Kitt Peak	Spacewatch	·	1.6 km	MPC · JPL
774441	2004 FS_{9}	—	March 16, 2004	Kitt Peak	Spacewatch	·	1.2 km	MPC · JPL
774442	2004 FZ_{16}	—	March 16, 2004	Mauna Kea	D. D. Balam	·	890 m	MPC · JPL
774443	2004 FC_{17}	—	March 16, 2004	Mauna Kea	D. D. Balam	·	1.1 km	MPC · JPL
774444	2004 FZ_{35}	—	March 15, 2004	Kitt Peak	Spacewatch	(5)	840 m	MPC · JPL
774445	2004 FJ_{99}	—	March 21, 2004	Kitt Peak	Spacewatch	·	1.0 km	MPC · JPL
774446	2004 FT_{100}	—	March 23, 2004	Kitt Peak	Spacewatch	MAR	740 m	MPC · JPL
774447	2004 FA_{155}	—	March 17, 2004	Kitt Peak	Spacewatch	EUN	820 m	MPC · JPL
774448	2004 FL_{168}	—	March 16, 2004	Apache Point	SDSS	(116763)	1.4 km	MPC · JPL
774449	2004 FJ_{172}	—	December 31, 2007	Mount Lemmon	Mount Lemmon Survey	LEO	1.2 km	MPC · JPL
774450	2004 FW_{172}	—	September 9, 2015	Haleakala	Pan-STARRS 1	·	1.4 km	MPC · JPL
774451	2004 FT_{174}	—	September 1, 2017	Mount Lemmon	Mount Lemmon Survey	·	1.9 km	MPC · JPL
774452	2004 FO_{176}	—	December 6, 2015	Mount Lemmon	Mount Lemmon Survey	·	770 m	MPC · JPL
774453	2004 FX_{176}	—	August 21, 2015	Haleakala	Pan-STARRS 1	HNS	700 m	MPC · JPL
774454	2004 FQ_{177}	—	November 6, 2015	Mount Lemmon	Mount Lemmon Survey	·	1.0 km	MPC · JPL
774455	2004 FR_{177}	—	October 1, 2005	Catalina	CSS	·	1.4 km	MPC · JPL
774456	2004 FA_{178}	—	March 17, 2004	Kitt Peak	Spacewatch	·	1.3 km	MPC · JPL
774457	2004 FB_{178}	—	March 31, 2004	Kitt Peak	Spacewatch	(1547)	980 m	MPC · JPL
774458	2004 GQ_{8}	—	April 12, 2004	Kitt Peak	Spacewatch	·	1.1 km	MPC · JPL
774459	2004 GJ_{35}	—	April 13, 2004	Kitt Peak	Spacewatch	EUN	840 m	MPC · JPL
774460	2004 GM_{55}	—	April 13, 2004	Kitt Peak	Spacewatch	·	1.6 km	MPC · JPL
774461	2004 GP_{56}	—	April 13, 2004	Kitt Peak	Spacewatch	·	2.5 km	MPC · JPL
774462	2004 GR_{56}	—	April 13, 2004	Kitt Peak	Spacewatch	·	920 m	MPC · JPL
774463	2004 GA_{65}	—	April 13, 2004	Kitt Peak	Spacewatch	EOS	1.4 km	MPC · JPL
774464	2004 GK_{67}	—	April 13, 2004	Kitt Peak	Spacewatch	ADE	1.5 km	MPC · JPL
774465	2004 GC_{90}	—	April 16, 2013	Haleakala	Pan-STARRS 1	·	1.2 km	MPC · JPL
774466	2004 GS_{90}	—	August 2, 2016	Haleakala	Pan-STARRS 1	EOS	1.4 km	MPC · JPL
774467	2004 GA_{92}	—	March 17, 2015	Haleakala	Pan-STARRS 1	THM	1.9 km	MPC · JPL
774468	2004 HX_{16}	—	April 16, 2004	Kitt Peak	Spacewatch	·	1.1 km	MPC · JPL
774469	2004 HC_{42}	—	April 20, 2004	Kitt Peak	Spacewatch	·	1.9 km	MPC · JPL
774470	2004 HC_{46}	—	April 21, 2004	Siding Spring	SSS	·	1.7 km	MPC · JPL
774471	2004 HT_{60}	—	April 13, 2004	Kitt Peak	Spacewatch	·	1.4 km	MPC · JPL
774472	2004 HL_{77}	—	April 26, 2004	Mauna Kea	P. A. Wiegert, D. D. Balam	·	1.2 km	MPC · JPL
774473	2004 HB_{82}	—	February 28, 2008	Mount Lemmon	Mount Lemmon Survey	·	1.2 km	MPC · JPL
774474	2004 HC_{82}	—	November 24, 2014	Haleakala	Pan-STARRS 1	EUN	910 m	MPC · JPL
774475	2004 HE_{82}	—	April 25, 2004	Kitt Peak	Spacewatch	·	1.3 km	MPC · JPL
774476	2004 HB_{84}	—	November 1, 2005	Mount Lemmon	Mount Lemmon Survey	EUN	970 m	MPC · JPL
774477	2004 HE_{85}	—	May 13, 2016	Haleakala	Pan-STARRS 1	URS	2.2 km	MPC · JPL
774478	2004 HL_{85}	—	April 21, 2004	Kitt Peak	Spacewatch	·	2.0 km	MPC · JPL
774479	2004 HB_{86}	—	April 24, 2004	Kitt Peak	Spacewatch	·	900 m	MPC · JPL
774480	2004 JO_{9}	—	May 13, 2004	Kitt Peak	Spacewatch	·	930 m	MPC · JPL
774481	2004 JH_{48}	—	May 13, 2004	Kitt Peak	Spacewatch	·	1.7 km	MPC · JPL
774482	2004 JC_{49}	—	May 13, 2004	Kitt Peak	Spacewatch	·	1.1 km	MPC · JPL
774483	2004 JQ_{57}	—	March 8, 2008	Mount Lemmon	Mount Lemmon Survey	·	860 m	MPC · JPL
774484	2004 JS_{58}	—	May 14, 2004	Kitt Peak	Spacewatch	·	1.0 km	MPC · JPL
774485	2004 KP_{20}	—	May 19, 2004	Kitt Peak	Spacewatch	·	1.2 km	MPC · JPL
774486	2004 LJ_{33}	—	June 15, 2004	Kitt Peak	Spacewatch	·	1.4 km	MPC · JPL
774487	2004 MT_{3}	—	June 19, 2004	Kitt Peak	Spacewatch	·	1.6 km	MPC · JPL
774488	2004 MH_{9}	—	February 15, 2012	Haleakala	Pan-STARRS 1	·	1.2 km	MPC · JPL
774489	2004 MW_{9}	—	January 3, 2016	Haleakala	Pan-STARRS 1	·	1.5 km	MPC · JPL
774490	2004 NZ_{17}	—	July 14, 2004	Socorro	LINEAR	·	1.3 km	MPC · JPL
774491	2004 NJ_{18}	—	July 14, 2004	Socorro	LINEAR	·	1.4 km	MPC · JPL
774492	2004 NE_{34}	—	December 13, 2015	Haleakala	Pan-STARRS 1	·	960 m	MPC · JPL
774493	2004 OC_{17}	—	September 18, 2009	Kitt Peak	Spacewatch	·	1.5 km	MPC · JPL
774494	2004 PT_{30}	—	August 8, 2004	Socorro	LINEAR	(5)	880 m	MPC · JPL
774495	2004 PX_{32}	—	August 8, 2004	Socorro	LINEAR	·	1.6 km	MPC · JPL
774496	2004 PE_{41}	—	August 9, 2004	Siding Spring	SSS	·	1.2 km	MPC · JPL
774497	2004 PO_{93}	—	August 9, 2004	Socorro	LINEAR	·	1.4 km	MPC · JPL
774498	2004 PQ_{114}	—	August 12, 2004	Socorro	LINEAR	·	1.3 km	MPC · JPL
774499	2004 PG_{119}	—	August 13, 2004	Cerro Tololo	Deep Ecliptic Survey	·	1.6 km	MPC · JPL
774500	2004 PL_{119}	—	August 13, 2004	Cerro Tololo	Deep Ecliptic Survey	EUN	800 m	MPC · JPL

== 774501–774600 ==
back to top

Designation			Discovery			Properties		Ref
Permanent	Provisional	Named after	Date	Site	Discoverer(s)	Category	Diam.	Ref
774501	2004 PE_{122}	—	August 8, 2018	Haleakala	Pan-STARRS 1	GEF	710 m	MPC · JPL
774502	2004 PF_{122}	—	March 11, 2014	Mount Lemmon	Mount Lemmon Survey	·	2.2 km	MPC · JPL
774503	2004 QT_{10}	—	July 22, 2004	Anderson Mesa	LONEOS	JUN	980 m	MPC · JPL
774504	2004 QV_{23}	—	August 22, 2004	Mauna Kea	Veillet, C.	·	980 m	MPC · JPL
774505	2004 QK_{28}	—	August 25, 2004	Kitt Peak	Spacewatch	·	2.8 km	MPC · JPL
774506	2004 QR_{34}	—	September 17, 2009	Kitt Peak	Spacewatch	AEO	780 m	MPC · JPL
774507	2004 QE_{35}	—	September 9, 2013	Haleakala	Pan-STARRS 1	·	1.1 km	MPC · JPL
774508	2004 QL_{36}	—	August 25, 2004	Kitt Peak	Spacewatch	·	1.3 km	MPC · JPL
774509	2004 QT_{37}	—	March 20, 2021	Mount Lemmon	Mount Lemmon Survey	·	1.3 km	MPC · JPL
774510	2004 QN_{38}	—	August 23, 2004	Kitt Peak	Spacewatch	·	860 m	MPC · JPL
774511	2004 QH_{39}	—	August 23, 2004	Kitt Peak	Spacewatch	·	1.4 km	MPC · JPL
774512	2004 RU_{35}	—	September 7, 2004	Socorro	LINEAR	·	1.3 km	MPC · JPL
774513	2004 RJ_{94}	—	September 8, 2004	Socorro	LINEAR	·	1.1 km	MPC · JPL
774514	2004 RJ_{128}	—	September 7, 2004	Kitt Peak	Spacewatch	·	1.1 km	MPC · JPL
774515	2004 RA_{173}	—	September 9, 2004	Kitt Peak	Spacewatch	·	1.5 km	MPC · JPL
774516	2004 RC_{209}	—	September 11, 2004	Socorro	LINEAR	EUN	1.0 km	MPC · JPL
774517	2004 RT_{223}	—	September 8, 2004	Socorro	LINEAR	·	970 m	MPC · JPL
774518	2004 RK_{227}	—	September 9, 2004	Kitt Peak	Spacewatch	EOS	1.5 km	MPC · JPL
774519	2004 RC_{237}	—	September 10, 2004	Kitt Peak	Spacewatch	·	840 m	MPC · JPL
774520	2004 RN_{238}	—	September 10, 2004	Kitt Peak	Spacewatch	·	1.0 km	MPC · JPL
774521	2004 RM_{257}	—	September 11, 2004	Kitt Peak	Spacewatch	·	930 m	MPC · JPL
774522	2004 RK_{261}	—	September 10, 2004	Kitt Peak	Spacewatch	·	1.2 km	MPC · JPL
774523	2004 RZ_{267}	—	September 11, 2004	Kitt Peak	Spacewatch	T_{j} (2.99) · EUP	2.4 km	MPC · JPL
774524	2004 RR_{273}	—	September 11, 2004	Kitt Peak	Spacewatch	·	1.8 km	MPC · JPL
774525	2004 RZ_{295}	—	September 11, 2004	Kitt Peak	Spacewatch	·	1.3 km	MPC · JPL
774526	2004 RY_{296}	—	September 11, 2004	Kitt Peak	Spacewatch	·	1.3 km	MPC · JPL
774527	2004 RR_{299}	—	September 11, 2004	Kitt Peak	Spacewatch	EUN	840 m	MPC · JPL
774528	2004 RT_{326}	—	September 13, 2004	Kitt Peak	Spacewatch	·	1.4 km	MPC · JPL
774529	2004 RQ_{350}	—	September 16, 2004	Kitt Peak	Spacewatch	·	3.0 km	MPC · JPL
774530	2004 RT_{351}	—	September 16, 2004	Kitt Peak	Spacewatch	·	840 m	MPC · JPL
774531	2004 RL_{355}	—	September 12, 2004	Mauna Kea	P. A. Wiegert, S. Popa	·	2.1 km	MPC · JPL
774532	2004 RM_{360}	—	October 5, 2013	Haleakala	Pan-STARRS 1	·	1.4 km	MPC · JPL
774533	2004 RT_{360}	—	September 19, 2014	Haleakala	Pan-STARRS 1	·	1.5 km	MPC · JPL
774534	2004 RX_{361}	—	September 15, 2009	Kitt Peak	Spacewatch	KOR	1.0 km	MPC · JPL
774535	2004 RN_{362}	—	July 15, 2013	Haleakala	Pan-STARRS 1	·	1.5 km	MPC · JPL
774536	2004 RK_{366}	—	September 11, 2004	Kitt Peak	Spacewatch	AGN	950 m	MPC · JPL
774537	2004 RL_{367}	—	September 3, 2013	Haleakala	Pan-STARRS 1	·	1.4 km	MPC · JPL
774538	2004 SN_{7}	—	September 17, 2004	Kitt Peak	Spacewatch	·	1.2 km	MPC · JPL
774539	2004 SL_{35}	—	September 17, 2004	Kitt Peak	Spacewatch	·	1.5 km	MPC · JPL
774540	2004 SB_{43}	—	September 18, 2004	Socorro	LINEAR	·	1.5 km	MPC · JPL
774541	2004 TU_{25}	—	October 4, 2004	Kitt Peak	Spacewatch	·	1.0 km	MPC · JPL
774542	2004 TZ_{63}	—	October 5, 2004	Kitt Peak	Spacewatch	·	1.3 km	MPC · JPL
774543	2004 TU_{70}	—	October 6, 2004	Kitt Peak	Spacewatch	·	710 m	MPC · JPL
774544	2004 TZ_{86}	—	October 5, 2004	Kitt Peak	Spacewatch	·	1.4 km	MPC · JPL
774545	2004 TB_{147}	—	October 6, 2004	Kitt Peak	Spacewatch	·	1.6 km	MPC · JPL
774546	2004 TY_{147}	—	October 6, 2004	Kitt Peak	Spacewatch	·	1.2 km	MPC · JPL
774547	2004 TP_{154}	—	September 23, 2004	Kitt Peak	Spacewatch	·	2.2 km	MPC · JPL
774548	2004 TC_{165}	—	October 7, 2004	Kitt Peak	Spacewatch	·	1.1 km	MPC · JPL
774549	2004 TV_{189}	—	October 7, 2004	Kitt Peak	Spacewatch	·	1.3 km	MPC · JPL
774550	2004 TZ_{213}	—	October 9, 2004	Kitt Peak	Spacewatch	KOR	950 m	MPC · JPL
774551	2004 TN_{229}	—	October 8, 2004	Kitt Peak	Spacewatch	·	1.4 km	MPC · JPL
774552	2004 TQ_{257}	—	October 9, 2004	Kitt Peak	Spacewatch	·	1.8 km	MPC · JPL
774553	2004 TY_{268}	—	October 9, 2004	Kitt Peak	Spacewatch	·	970 m	MPC · JPL
774554	2004 TM_{286}	—	October 8, 2004	Kitt Peak	Spacewatch	EUN	840 m	MPC · JPL
774555	2004 TH_{307}	—	October 10, 2004	Socorro	LINEAR	·	1.2 km	MPC · JPL
774556	2004 TP_{307}	—	October 10, 2004	Kitt Peak	Spacewatch	·	2.3 km	MPC · JPL
774557	2004 TP_{309}	—	October 10, 2004	Kitt Peak	Spacewatch	KOR	890 m	MPC · JPL
774558	2004 TQ_{352}	—	October 11, 2004	Kitt Peak	Deep Ecliptic Survey	AEO	740 m	MPC · JPL
774559	2004 TW_{371}	—	October 15, 2004	Mount Lemmon	Mount Lemmon Survey	·	730 m	MPC · JPL
774560	2004 TL_{374}	—	September 14, 2013	Mount Lemmon	Mount Lemmon Survey	·	1.4 km	MPC · JPL
774561	2004 TL_{377}	—	October 23, 2013	Mount Lemmon	Mount Lemmon Survey	·	1.2 km	MPC · JPL
774562	2004 TS_{377}	—	September 15, 2009	Kitt Peak	Spacewatch	·	1.3 km	MPC · JPL
774563	2004 TB_{378}	—	March 2, 2011	Kitt Peak	Spacewatch	·	1.2 km	MPC · JPL
774564	2004 TZ_{380}	—	October 15, 2004	Kitt Peak	Deep Ecliptic Survey	·	2.5 km	MPC · JPL
774565	2004 VQ_{97}	—	November 9, 2004	Mauna Kea	Veillet, C.	·	1.4 km	MPC · JPL
774566	2004 VP_{102}	—	November 9, 2004	Mauna Kea	Veillet, C.	·	1.4 km	MPC · JPL
774567	2004 VQ_{102}	—	November 9, 2004	Mauna Kea	Veillet, C.	·	1.4 km	MPC · JPL
774568	2004 VM_{106}	—	October 10, 2004	Kitt Peak	Deep Ecliptic Survey	AGN	820 m	MPC · JPL
774569	2004 VV_{107}	—	November 9, 2004	Mauna Kea	Veillet, C.	·	760 m	MPC · JPL
774570	2004 VN_{115}	—	November 9, 2004	Mauna Kea	P. A. Wiegert, A. Papadimos	·	1.1 km	MPC · JPL
774571	2004 VD_{133}	—	January 29, 2011	Mount Lemmon	Mount Lemmon Survey	·	1.8 km	MPC · JPL
774572	2004 VE_{134}	—	September 23, 2008	Mount Lemmon	Mount Lemmon Survey	·	1.1 km	MPC · JPL
774573	2004 VN_{136}	—	November 21, 2017	Haleakala	Pan-STARRS 1	·	890 m	MPC · JPL
774574	2004 VJ_{139}	—	August 2, 2016	Haleakala	Pan-STARRS 1	·	2.4 km	MPC · JPL
774575	2004 WG_{13}	—	August 2, 2016	Haleakala	Pan-STARRS 1	(5)	990 m	MPC · JPL
774576	2004 XE_{59}	—	December 10, 2004	Kitt Peak	Spacewatch	·	890 m	MPC · JPL
774577	2004 XT_{195}	—	November 16, 2009	Kitt Peak	Spacewatch	·	1.3 km	MPC · JPL
774578	2004 YE_{8}	—	November 4, 2004	Kitt Peak	Spacewatch	·	2.5 km	MPC · JPL
774579	2005 AC_{49}	—	January 13, 2005	Kitt Peak	Spacewatch	·	1.1 km	MPC · JPL
774580	2005 AF_{85}	—	January 22, 2015	Haleakala	Pan-STARRS 1	·	1.5 km	MPC · JPL
774581	2005 BK_{30}	—	January 16, 2005	Mauna Kea	Veillet, C.	·	790 m	MPC · JPL
774582	2005 BR_{42}	—	January 16, 2005	Mauna Kea	Veillet, C.	·	830 m	MPC · JPL
774583	2005 BV_{43}	—	January 16, 2005	Mauna Kea	Veillet, C.	·	1.4 km	MPC · JPL
774584	2005 BB_{45}	—	January 16, 2005	Mauna Kea	Veillet, C.	·	1.9 km	MPC · JPL
774585	2005 BT_{45}	—	January 16, 2005	Mauna Kea	Veillet, C.	KOR	930 m	MPC · JPL
774586	2005 BY_{52}	—	August 2, 2016	Haleakala	Pan-STARRS 1	·	1.1 km	MPC · JPL
774587	2005 BD_{56}	—	January 16, 2005	Kitt Peak	Spacewatch	EUN	990 m	MPC · JPL
774588	2005 BO_{56}	—	January 16, 2005	Catalina	CSS	·	1.2 km	MPC · JPL
774589	2005 BQ_{56}	—	January 1, 2009	Kitt Peak	Spacewatch	·	750 m	MPC · JPL
774590	2005 BY_{56}	—	August 15, 2013	Haleakala	Pan-STARRS 1	·	1.3 km	MPC · JPL
774591	2005 BE_{57}	—	January 17, 2016	Haleakala	Pan-STARRS 1	·	1.9 km	MPC · JPL
774592	2005 BQ_{57}	—	August 8, 2018	Haleakala	Pan-STARRS 1	·	1.6 km	MPC · JPL
774593	2005 CC_{16}	—	February 2, 2005	Socorro	LINEAR	·	1.3 km	MPC · JPL
774594	2005 CT_{29}	—	February 1, 2005	Kitt Peak	Spacewatch	·	1.5 km	MPC · JPL
774595	2005 CQ_{55}	—	February 4, 2005	Mount Lemmon	Mount Lemmon Survey	·	2.2 km	MPC · JPL
774596	2005 CG_{70}	—	February 8, 2005	Mauna Kea	Veillet, C.	·	1.7 km	MPC · JPL
774597	2005 CV_{84}	—	March 11, 2016	Haleakala	Pan-STARRS 1	·	1.8 km	MPC · JPL
774598	2005 CK_{88}	—	August 9, 2013	Haleakala	Pan-STARRS 1	·	1.9 km	MPC · JPL
774599	2005 CN_{90}	—	February 14, 2005	Kitt Peak	Spacewatch	·	990 m	MPC · JPL
774600	2005 ED_{6}	—	March 1, 2005	Kitt Peak	Spacewatch	·	1.2 km	MPC · JPL

== 774601–774700 ==
back to top

Designation			Discovery			Properties		Ref
Permanent	Provisional	Named after	Date	Site	Discoverer(s)	Category	Diam.	Ref
774601	2005 ET_{15}	—	March 3, 2005	Kitt Peak	Spacewatch	·	1.4 km	MPC · JPL
774602	2005 EQ_{43}	—	March 3, 2005	Kitt Peak	Spacewatch	·	1.5 km	MPC · JPL
774603	2005 EF_{64}	—	March 4, 2005	Mount Lemmon	Mount Lemmon Survey	·	1.0 km	MPC · JPL
774604	2005 EF_{114}	—	March 4, 2005	Mount Lemmon	Mount Lemmon Survey	·	2.4 km	MPC · JPL
774605	2005 EP_{120}	—	February 4, 2005	Kitt Peak	Spacewatch	·	1.3 km	MPC · JPL
774606	2005 EO_{132}	—	March 9, 2005	Kitt Peak	Spacewatch	RAF	730 m	MPC · JPL
774607	2005 EL_{195}	—	March 11, 2005	Mount Lemmon	Mount Lemmon Survey	·	1.9 km	MPC · JPL
774608	2005 EP_{255}	—	March 11, 2005	Mount Lemmon	Mount Lemmon Survey	·	2.1 km	MPC · JPL
774609	2005 EN_{274}	—	January 18, 2016	Haleakala	Pan-STARRS 1	EOS	1.3 km	MPC · JPL
774610	2005 EL_{294}	—	November 3, 2007	Kitt Peak	Spacewatch	·	890 m	MPC · JPL
774611	2005 EY_{329}	—	March 3, 2005	Kitt Peak	Spacewatch	·	1.1 km	MPC · JPL
774612	2005 ED_{338}	—	October 28, 2008	Kitt Peak	Spacewatch	·	1.2 km	MPC · JPL
774613	2005 EH_{338}	—	November 7, 2008	Mount Lemmon	Mount Lemmon Survey	·	1.2 km	MPC · JPL
774614	2005 EK_{339}	—	March 10, 2005	Mount Lemmon	Mount Lemmon Survey	·	2.4 km	MPC · JPL
774615	2005 EX_{339}	—	March 11, 2005	Kitt Peak	Spacewatch	·	970 m	MPC · JPL
774616	2005 EL_{342}	—	October 25, 2008	Mount Lemmon	Mount Lemmon Survey	EOS	1.4 km	MPC · JPL
774617	2005 EC_{343}	—	September 12, 2007	Mount Lemmon	Mount Lemmon Survey	·	1.2 km	MPC · JPL
774618	2005 EU_{343}	—	April 5, 2014	Haleakala	Pan-STARRS 1	EUN	810 m	MPC · JPL
774619	2005 EW_{345}	—	January 17, 2016	Haleakala	Pan-STARRS 1	·	1.9 km	MPC · JPL
774620	2005 EZ_{345}	—	January 14, 2015	Haleakala	Pan-STARRS 1	·	1.3 km	MPC · JPL
774621	2005 EC_{346}	—	October 20, 2016	Mount Lemmon	Mount Lemmon Survey	·	1.6 km	MPC · JPL
774622	2005 EM_{347}	—	March 11, 2005	Mount Lemmon	Mount Lemmon Survey	·	1.1 km	MPC · JPL
774623	2005 EP_{347}	—	March 10, 2005	Mount Lemmon	Mount Lemmon Survey	·	970 m	MPC · JPL
774624	2005 EQ_{351}	—	March 8, 2005	Mount Lemmon	Mount Lemmon Survey	·	960 m	MPC · JPL
774625	2005 FZ_{15}	—	November 17, 2014	Haleakala	Pan-STARRS 1	·	2.3 km	MPC · JPL
774626	2005 FR_{16}	—	March 11, 2005	Mount Lemmon	Mount Lemmon Survey	·	1.5 km	MPC · JPL
774627	2005 FB_{21}	—	March 16, 2005	Kitt Peak	Spacewatch	·	940 m	MPC · JPL
774628	2005 GY_{23}	—	March 11, 2005	Kitt Peak	Deep Ecliptic Survey	·	950 m	MPC · JPL
774629	2005 GG_{32}	—	April 4, 2005	Mount Lemmon	Mount Lemmon Survey	·	2.5 km	MPC · JPL
774630	2005 GG_{40}	—	March 13, 2005	Mount Lemmon	Mount Lemmon Survey	AEO	950 m	MPC · JPL
774631	2005 GY_{65}	—	June 30, 2021	Haleakala	Pan-STARRS 1	EOS	1.3 km	MPC · JPL
774632	2005 GG_{85}	—	March 10, 2016	Haleakala	Pan-STARRS 1	EOS	1.5 km	MPC · JPL
774633	2005 GB_{98}	—	April 7, 2005	Mount Lemmon	Mount Lemmon Survey	·	2.5 km	MPC · JPL
774634	2005 GR_{105}	—	April 10, 2005	Kitt Peak	Spacewatch	·	1.1 km	MPC · JPL
774635	2005 GD_{121}	—	April 5, 2005	Mount Lemmon	Mount Lemmon Survey	EOS	1.3 km	MPC · JPL
774636	2005 GP_{131}	—	April 10, 2005	Kitt Peak	Spacewatch	·	1.2 km	MPC · JPL
774637	2005 GZ_{142}	—	March 11, 2005	Mount Lemmon	Mount Lemmon Survey	EUN	870 m	MPC · JPL
774638	2005 GJ_{143}	—	April 10, 2005	Kitt Peak	Spacewatch	·	1.9 km	MPC · JPL
774639	2005 GV_{185}	—	April 10, 2005	Kitt Peak	Deep Ecliptic Survey	THM	1.5 km	MPC · JPL
774640	2005 GS_{187}	—	April 12, 2005	Kitt Peak	Deep Ecliptic Survey	·	1.2 km	MPC · JPL
774641	2005 GC_{190}	—	March 10, 2005	Mount Lemmon	Mount Lemmon Survey	THM	1.8 km	MPC · JPL
774642	2005 GD_{192}	—	April 12, 2005	Kitt Peak	Deep Ecliptic Survey	·	1.1 km	MPC · JPL
774643	2005 GH_{194}	—	April 10, 2005	Kitt Peak	Deep Ecliptic Survey	·	2.4 km	MPC · JPL
774644	2005 GE_{197}	—	April 10, 2005	Kitt Peak	Deep Ecliptic Survey	·	1.3 km	MPC · JPL
774645	2005 GN_{199}	—	April 10, 2005	Kitt Peak	Deep Ecliptic Survey	·	770 m	MPC · JPL
774646	2005 GS_{205}	—	April 11, 2005	Kitt Peak	Deep Ecliptic Survey	·	2.1 km	MPC · JPL
774647	2005 GB_{223}	—	April 10, 2005	Mount Lemmon	Mount Lemmon Survey	·	2.1 km	MPC · JPL
774648	2005 GB_{230}	—	April 4, 2005	Mount Lemmon	Mount Lemmon Survey	·	2.2 km	MPC · JPL
774649	2005 GE_{233}	—	March 19, 2013	Haleakala	Pan-STARRS 1	·	780 m	MPC · JPL
774650	2005 GC_{235}	—	November 19, 2015	Kitt Peak	Spacewatch	·	920 m	MPC · JPL
774651	2005 GP_{235}	—	March 1, 2009	Kitt Peak	Spacewatch	·	1.2 km	MPC · JPL
774652	2005 GU_{235}	—	October 19, 1998	Kitt Peak	Spacewatch	(5)	900 m	MPC · JPL
774653	2005 GB_{237}	—	January 30, 2017	Haleakala	Pan-STARRS 1	·	1.0 km	MPC · JPL
774654	2005 GF_{241}	—	April 6, 2005	Kitt Peak	Spacewatch	·	1.5 km	MPC · JPL
774655	2005 HD_{13}	—	April 30, 2005	Kitt Peak	Spacewatch	·	890 m	MPC · JPL
774656	2005 JC_{9}	—	May 4, 2005	Mauna Kea	Veillet, C.	EUN	820 m	MPC · JPL
774657	2005 JC_{11}	—	May 4, 2005	Mauna Kea	Veillet, C.	·	2.2 km	MPC · JPL
774658	2005 JH_{15}	—	April 9, 2005	Anderson Mesa	LONEOS	·	1.1 km	MPC · JPL
774659	2005 JM_{32}	—	May 4, 2005	Kitt Peak	Spacewatch	·	980 m	MPC · JPL
774660	2005 JS_{39}	—	May 7, 2005	Mount Lemmon	Mount Lemmon Survey	·	900 m	MPC · JPL
774661	2005 JR_{43}	—	May 8, 2005	Kitt Peak	Spacewatch	·	3.7 km	MPC · JPL
774662	2005 JK_{47}	—	May 3, 2005	Kitt Peak	Spacewatch	·	1.8 km	MPC · JPL
774663	2005 JN_{52}	—	May 4, 2005	Kitt Peak	Spacewatch	·	2.6 km	MPC · JPL
774664	2005 JL_{102}	—	May 9, 2005	Kitt Peak	Spacewatch	·	1.5 km	MPC · JPL
774665	2005 JB_{104}	—	May 10, 2005	Mount Lemmon	Mount Lemmon Survey	·	940 m	MPC · JPL
774666	2005 JU_{158}	—	May 6, 2005	Kitt Peak	Spacewatch	·	1.0 km	MPC · JPL
774667	2005 JP_{159}	—	March 14, 2005	Mount Lemmon	Mount Lemmon Survey	·	1.2 km	MPC · JPL
774668	2005 JP_{164}	—	May 10, 2005	Kitt Peak	Spacewatch	·	1.6 km	MPC · JPL
774669	2005 JO_{170}	—	May 10, 2005	Cerro Tololo	Deep Ecliptic Survey	·	1.3 km	MPC · JPL
774670	2005 JP_{171}	—	May 11, 2005	Mount Lemmon	Mount Lemmon Survey	·	1.4 km	MPC · JPL
774671	2005 JZ_{172}	—	May 10, 2005	Cerro Tololo	Deep Ecliptic Survey	·	1.2 km	MPC · JPL
774672	2005 JD_{183}	—	May 10, 2005	Mount Lemmon	Mount Lemmon Survey	·	1.7 km	MPC · JPL
774673	2005 JA_{190}	—	October 20, 2011	Mount Lemmon	Mount Lemmon Survey	·	1.2 km	MPC · JPL
774674	2005 JC_{192}	—	May 13, 2005	Kitt Peak	Spacewatch	·	1.4 km	MPC · JPL
774675	2005 JJ_{192}	—	March 25, 2015	Haleakala	Pan-STARRS 1	EOS	1.4 km	MPC · JPL
774676	2005 JK_{192}	—	October 9, 2015	Haleakala	Pan-STARRS 1	HNS	620 m	MPC · JPL
774677	2005 JQ_{192}	—	April 19, 2009	Kitt Peak	Spacewatch	EUN	990 m	MPC · JPL
774678	2005 JR_{193}	—	November 7, 2012	Haleakala	Pan-STARRS 1	EOS	1.5 km	MPC · JPL
774679	2005 JJ_{194}	—	March 18, 2013	Mount Lemmon	Mount Lemmon Survey	·	850 m	MPC · JPL
774680	2005 JV_{194}	—	May 3, 2005	Kitt Peak	Spacewatch	·	790 m	MPC · JPL
774681	2005 JY_{194}	—	May 3, 2005	Kitt Peak	Spacewatch	·	1.2 km	MPC · JPL
774682	2005 JJ_{195}	—	May 9, 2005	Mount Lemmon	Mount Lemmon Survey	·	790 m	MPC · JPL
774683	2005 JR_{195}	—	May 13, 2005	Kitt Peak	Spacewatch	·	1.1 km	MPC · JPL
774684	2005 KD_{16}	—	May 20, 2005	Mount Lemmon	Mount Lemmon Survey	·	1.1 km	MPC · JPL
774685	2005 LR_{33}	—	June 10, 2005	Kitt Peak	Spacewatch	·	1.4 km	MPC · JPL
774686	2005 LC_{57}	—	January 30, 2017	Haleakala	Pan-STARRS 1	·	1.3 km	MPC · JPL
774687	2005 LD_{57}	—	February 20, 2014	Mount Lemmon	Mount Lemmon Survey	·	1.6 km	MPC · JPL
774688	2005 LF_{57}	—	February 22, 2017	Mount Lemmon	Mount Lemmon Survey	·	1.1 km	MPC · JPL
774689	2005 LD_{58}	—	May 21, 2014	Haleakala	Pan-STARRS 1	·	1.3 km	MPC · JPL
774690	2005 LJ_{58}	—	November 15, 2006	Mount Lemmon	Mount Lemmon Survey	THM	1.6 km	MPC · JPL
774691	2005 LQ_{58}	—	July 25, 2014	Haleakala	Pan-STARRS 1	·	970 m	MPC · JPL
774692	2005 LC_{60}	—	May 20, 2015	Cerro Tololo	DECam	L4	5.9 km	MPC · JPL
774693	2005 LN_{60}	—	August 24, 2017	Haleakala	Pan-STARRS 1	·	2.1 km	MPC · JPL
774694	2005 LF_{61}	—	January 24, 2014	Haleakala	Pan-STARRS 1	·	1.8 km	MPC · JPL
774695	2005 MJ_{44}	—	June 17, 2005	Kitt Peak	Spacewatch	·	1.2 km	MPC · JPL
774696	2005 MK_{55}	—	June 17, 2005	Kitt Peak	Spacewatch	·	1.1 km	MPC · JPL
774697	2005 MS_{55}	—	March 14, 2013	Kitt Peak	Spacewatch	·	810 m	MPC · JPL
774698	2005 MM_{56}	—	October 28, 2014	Haleakala	Pan-STARRS 1	·	1.1 km	MPC · JPL
774699	2005 MR_{56}	—	June 16, 2005	Kitt Peak	Spacewatch	EUN	820 m	MPC · JPL
774700	2005 MD_{57}	—	June 29, 2005	Kitt Peak	Spacewatch	·	2.7 km	MPC · JPL

== 774701–774800 ==
back to top

Designation			Discovery			Properties		Ref
Permanent	Provisional	Named after	Date	Site	Discoverer(s)	Category	Diam.	Ref
774701	2005 NQ_{16}	—	July 2, 2005	Kitt Peak	Spacewatch	EUN	930 m	MPC · JPL
774702	2005 NR_{64}	—	July 1, 2005	Kitt Peak	Spacewatch	·	1.1 km	MPC · JPL
774703	2005 NU_{74}	—	July 9, 2005	Kitt Peak	Spacewatch	THM	2.0 km	MPC · JPL
774704	2005 NG_{96}	—	July 7, 2005	Kitt Peak	Spacewatch	·	1.6 km	MPC · JPL
774705	2005 NS_{103}	—	July 7, 2005	Mauna Kea	Veillet, C.	·	1.0 km	MPC · JPL
774706	2005 NE_{106}	—	July 7, 2005	Mauna Kea	Veillet, C.	GEF	850 m	MPC · JPL
774707	2005 NF_{106}	—	July 7, 2005	Mauna Kea	Veillet, C.	·	2.0 km	MPC · JPL
774708	2005 NH_{107}	—	July 7, 2005	Mauna Kea	Veillet, C.	·	990 m	MPC · JPL
774709	2005 NB_{109}	—	July 7, 2005	Mauna Kea	Veillet, C.	KOR	940 m	MPC · JPL
774710	2005 NK_{110}	—	July 7, 2005	Mauna Kea	Veillet, C.	·	1.8 km	MPC · JPL
774711	2005 NK_{112}	—	July 7, 2005	Mauna Kea	Veillet, C.	HOF	1.9 km	MPC · JPL
774712	2005 NE_{115}	—	July 7, 2005	Mauna Kea	Veillet, C.	·	1.6 km	MPC · JPL
774713	2005 NN_{116}	—	July 7, 2005	Mauna Kea	Veillet, C.	THM	1.5 km	MPC · JPL
774714	2005 NP_{119}	—	July 7, 2005	Mauna Kea	Veillet, C.	·	1.1 km	MPC · JPL
774715	2005 NQ_{119}	—	July 7, 2005	Mauna Kea	Veillet, C.	·	1.6 km	MPC · JPL
774716	2005 NH_{121}	—	July 7, 2005	Mauna Kea	Veillet, C.	THM	1.7 km	MPC · JPL
774717	2005 NK_{121}	—	July 7, 2005	Mauna Kea	Veillet, C.	KOR	1.0 km	MPC · JPL
774718	2005 NJ_{128}	—	October 8, 2016	Haleakala	Pan-STARRS 1	EOS	1.4 km	MPC · JPL
774719	2005 NC_{135}	—	April 16, 2020	Haleakala	Pan-STARRS 1	·	2.0 km	MPC · JPL
774720	2005 PT_{22}	—	August 8, 2005	Cerro Tololo	Deep Ecliptic Survey	THM	1.7 km	MPC · JPL
774721	2005 PT_{27}	—	August 10, 2005	Mauna Kea	P. A. Wiegert, D. D. Balam	·	1.1 km	MPC · JPL
774722	2005 PZ_{31}	—	August 8, 2005	Cerro Tololo	Deep Ecliptic Survey	·	1.3 km	MPC · JPL
774723	2005 PC_{32}	—	October 1, 2010	Mount Lemmon	Mount Lemmon Survey	AGN	810 m	MPC · JPL
774724	2005 PX_{32}	—	August 1, 2005	Campo Imperatore	CINEOS	·	2.1 km	MPC · JPL
774725	2005 QF_{102}	—	August 31, 2005	Kitt Peak	Spacewatch	·	1.1 km	MPC · JPL
774726	2005 QP_{110}	—	August 30, 2005	Kitt Peak	Spacewatch	T_{j} (2.98)	2.2 km	MPC · JPL
774727	2005 QR_{118}	—	August 28, 2005	Kitt Peak	Spacewatch	·	2.2 km	MPC · JPL
774728	2005 QL_{123}	—	August 28, 2005	Kitt Peak	Spacewatch	·	1.1 km	MPC · JPL
774729	2005 QS_{123}	—	August 28, 2005	Kitt Peak	Spacewatch	·	810 m	MPC · JPL
774730	2005 QP_{134}	—	August 28, 2005	Kitt Peak	Spacewatch	·	850 m	MPC · JPL
774731	2005 QU_{174}	—	August 31, 2005	Kitt Peak	Spacewatch	·	2.1 km	MPC · JPL
774732	2005 QJ_{185}	—	August 30, 2005	Mauna Kea	P. A. Wiegert	·	900 m	MPC · JPL
774733	2005 QU_{188}	—	August 30, 2005	Kitt Peak	Spacewatch	·	1.7 km	MPC · JPL
774734	2005 QM_{189}	—	August 28, 2005	Kitt Peak	Spacewatch	·	1.3 km	MPC · JPL
774735	2005 QY_{192}	—	August 31, 2005	Kitt Peak	Spacewatch	·	2.8 km	MPC · JPL
774736	2005 QU_{196}	—	August 30, 2005	Kitt Peak	Spacewatch	·	3.0 km	MPC · JPL
774737	2005 QE_{199}	—	October 4, 2014	Mount Lemmon	Mount Lemmon Survey	·	1.6 km	MPC · JPL
774738	2005 QF_{200}	—	December 29, 2011	Mount Lemmon	Mount Lemmon Survey	·	1.3 km	MPC · JPL
774739	2005 QX_{200}	—	March 29, 2017	Haleakala	Pan-STARRS 1	·	1.1 km	MPC · JPL
774740	2005 QM_{203}	—	August 31, 2005	Kitt Peak	Spacewatch	·	2.1 km	MPC · JPL
774741	2005 QC_{204}	—	December 4, 2015	Mount Lemmon	Mount Lemmon Survey	AEO	820 m	MPC · JPL
774742	2005 QY_{206}	—	August 28, 2005	Kitt Peak	Spacewatch	HYG	2.1 km	MPC · JPL
774743	2005 QK_{207}	—	August 29, 2005	Kitt Peak	Spacewatch	·	2.3 km	MPC · JPL
774744	2005 QU_{207}	—	August 31, 2005	Kitt Peak	Spacewatch	·	2.9 km	MPC · JPL
774745	2005 QN_{209}	—	February 13, 2008	Mount Lemmon	Mount Lemmon Survey	·	1.2 km	MPC · JPL
774746	2005 QQ_{210}	—	August 30, 2005	Kitt Peak	Spacewatch	·	1.1 km	MPC · JPL
774747	2005 QC_{211}	—	August 8, 2016	Haleakala	Pan-STARRS 1	·	2.2 km	MPC · JPL
774748	2005 RY_{14}	—	September 1, 2005	Kitt Peak	Spacewatch	THM	1.8 km	MPC · JPL
774749	2005 RX_{17}	—	September 1, 2005	Kitt Peak	Spacewatch	·	1.5 km	MPC · JPL
774750	2005 RW_{31}	—	September 13, 2005	Kitt Peak	Spacewatch	·	1.2 km	MPC · JPL
774751	2005 RW_{34}	—	September 3, 2005	Mauna Kea	Veillet, C.	·	2.1 km	MPC · JPL
774752	2005 RR_{48}	—	September 3, 2005	Mauna Kea	P. A. Wiegert	·	1.3 km	MPC · JPL
774753	2005 RJ_{52}	—	August 28, 2005	Kitt Peak	Spacewatch	·	1.2 km	MPC · JPL
774754	2005 RU_{58}	—	November 2, 2015	Haleakala	Pan-STARRS 1	·	1.4 km	MPC · JPL
774755	2005 RG_{59}	—	January 14, 2016	Haleakala	Pan-STARRS 1	·	1.6 km	MPC · JPL
774756	2005 RD_{63}	—	September 1, 2005	Kitt Peak	Spacewatch	ELF	2.5 km	MPC · JPL
774757	2005 SV_{8}	—	September 25, 2005	Kitt Peak	Spacewatch	·	2.4 km	MPC · JPL
774758	2005 SA_{85}	—	September 24, 2005	Kitt Peak	Spacewatch	·	2.2 km	MPC · JPL
774759	2005 SD_{108}	—	September 26, 2005	Kitt Peak	Spacewatch	·	1.1 km	MPC · JPL
774760	2005 SL_{127}	—	September 29, 2005	Mount Lemmon	Mount Lemmon Survey	·	1.3 km	MPC · JPL
774761	2005 SR_{127}	—	September 29, 2005	Mount Lemmon	Mount Lemmon Survey	KOR	1.1 km	MPC · JPL
774762	2005 SM_{141}	—	September 25, 2005	Kitt Peak	Spacewatch	·	1.3 km	MPC · JPL
774763	2005 SU_{162}	—	March 12, 2002	Kitt Peak	Spacewatch	·	1.6 km	MPC · JPL
774764	2005 SN_{178}	—	September 29, 2005	Anderson Mesa	LONEOS	·	1.9 km	MPC · JPL
774765	2005 SV_{184}	—	September 29, 2005	Kitt Peak	Spacewatch	·	1.5 km	MPC · JPL
774766	2005 SZ_{184}	—	September 29, 2005	Kitt Peak	Spacewatch	·	2.5 km	MPC · JPL
774767	2005 SR_{201}	—	September 30, 2005	Kitt Peak	Spacewatch	(5)	690 m	MPC · JPL
774768	2005 SD_{204}	—	September 30, 2005	Kitt Peak	Spacewatch	EOS	990 m	MPC · JPL
774769	2005 SQ_{212}	—	September 30, 2005	Mount Lemmon	Mount Lemmon Survey	·	1.1 km	MPC · JPL
774770	2005 SW_{217}	—	September 30, 2005	Mount Lemmon	Mount Lemmon Survey	·	1.3 km	MPC · JPL
774771	2005 SU_{225}	—	September 13, 2005	Kitt Peak	Spacewatch	·	1.3 km	MPC · JPL
774772	2005 SD_{246}	—	September 30, 2005	Mount Lemmon	Mount Lemmon Survey	·	2.5 km	MPC · JPL
774773	2005 SE_{249}	—	September 30, 2005	Mount Lemmon	Mount Lemmon Survey	NEM	1.6 km	MPC · JPL
774774	2005 SW_{259}	—	September 25, 2005	Kitt Peak	Spacewatch	·	1.2 km	MPC · JPL
774775	2005 SA_{267}	—	September 29, 2005	Mount Lemmon	Mount Lemmon Survey	·	2.4 km	MPC · JPL
774776	2005 SL_{292}	—	September 29, 2005	Mount Lemmon	Mount Lemmon Survey	·	1.4 km	MPC · JPL
774777	2005 SG_{296}	—	September 27, 2005	Kitt Peak	Spacewatch	·	1.3 km	MPC · JPL
774778	2005 SR_{298}	—	September 25, 2005	Kitt Peak	Spacewatch	JUN	850 m	MPC · JPL
774779	2005 SA_{299}	—	September 30, 2005	Mount Lemmon	Mount Lemmon Survey	·	1.3 km	MPC · JPL
774780	2005 SD_{300}	—	September 29, 2005	Mount Lemmon	Mount Lemmon Survey	·	1.2 km	MPC · JPL
774781	2005 SF_{304}	—	September 25, 2005	Kitt Peak	Spacewatch	·	1.9 km	MPC · JPL
774782	2005 SK_{305}	—	September 26, 2005	Kitt Peak	Spacewatch	·	2.2 km	MPC · JPL
774783	2005 TT_{8}	—	October 1, 2005	Kitt Peak	Spacewatch	·	1.5 km	MPC · JPL
774784	2005 TT_{11}	—	October 1, 2005	Mount Lemmon	Mount Lemmon Survey	·	2.3 km	MPC · JPL
774785	2005 TU_{12}	—	August 18, 2018	Haleakala	Pan-STARRS 1	·	1.2 km	MPC · JPL
774786	2005 TZ_{30}	—	October 1, 2005	Kitt Peak	Spacewatch	·	1.2 km	MPC · JPL
774787	2005 TB_{32}	—	October 1, 2005	Kitt Peak	Spacewatch	·	1.4 km	MPC · JPL
774788	2005 TT_{38}	—	October 1, 2005	Mount Lemmon	Mount Lemmon Survey	·	1.1 km	MPC · JPL
774789	2005 TJ_{65}	—	October 1, 2005	Kitt Peak	Spacewatch	·	1.3 km	MPC · JPL
774790	2005 TP_{66}	—	October 5, 2005	Kitt Peak	Spacewatch	·	1.1 km	MPC · JPL
774791	2005 TR_{83}	—	October 3, 2005	Kitt Peak	Spacewatch	·	1.3 km	MPC · JPL
774792	2005 TH_{84}	—	September 25, 2005	Kitt Peak	Spacewatch	·	1.3 km	MPC · JPL
774793	2005 TK_{85}	—	October 3, 2005	Kitt Peak	Spacewatch	·	2.2 km	MPC · JPL
774794	2005 TP_{91}	—	August 30, 2005	Kitt Peak	Spacewatch	·	1.3 km	MPC · JPL
774795	2005 TL_{92}	—	October 6, 2005	Kitt Peak	Spacewatch	·	1.4 km	MPC · JPL
774796	2005 TK_{93}	—	September 24, 2005	Kitt Peak	Spacewatch	·	1.6 km	MPC · JPL
774797	2005 TM_{94}	—	October 6, 2005	Kitt Peak	Spacewatch	·	1.2 km	MPC · JPL
774798	2005 TM_{95}	—	September 25, 2005	Kitt Peak	Spacewatch	·	1.1 km	MPC · JPL
774799	2005 TP_{95}	—	September 25, 2005	Kitt Peak	Spacewatch	NEM	1.6 km	MPC · JPL
774800	2005 TT_{96}	—	October 6, 2005	Mount Lemmon	Mount Lemmon Survey	·	1.3 km	MPC · JPL

== 774801–774900 ==
back to top

Designation			Discovery			Properties		Ref
Permanent	Provisional	Named after	Date	Site	Discoverer(s)	Category	Diam.	Ref
774801	2005 TH_{106}	—	October 9, 2005	Kitt Peak	Spacewatch	·	1.1 km	MPC · JPL
774802	2005 TV_{134}	—	October 10, 2005	Kitt Peak	Spacewatch	·	2.4 km	MPC · JPL
774803	2005 TD_{141}	—	October 8, 2005	Kitt Peak	Spacewatch	·	2.0 km	MPC · JPL
774804	2005 TG_{160}	—	October 9, 2005	Kitt Peak	Spacewatch	(5)	820 m	MPC · JPL
774805	2005 TF_{196}	—	October 9, 2005	Kitt Peak	Spacewatch	AGN	780 m	MPC · JPL
774806	2005 TG_{197}	—	September 29, 2005	Mount Lemmon	Mount Lemmon Survey	·	1.7 km	MPC · JPL
774807	2005 TM_{202}	—	September 1, 2013	Mount Lemmon	Mount Lemmon Survey	·	730 m	MPC · JPL
774808	2005 TN_{203}	—	September 20, 2009	Kitt Peak	Spacewatch	·	700 m	MPC · JPL
774809	2005 TZ_{203}	—	September 2, 2014	Haleakala	Pan-STARRS 1	·	1.5 km	MPC · JPL
774810	2005 TZ_{205}	—	November 19, 2017	Haleakala	Pan-STARRS 1	·	2.7 km	MPC · JPL
774811	2005 TO_{206}	—	October 12, 2005	Kitt Peak	Spacewatch	·	1.5 km	MPC · JPL
774812	2005 TJ_{207}	—	October 1, 2005	Kitt Peak	Spacewatch	(895)	2.6 km	MPC · JPL
774813	2005 TN_{207}	—	September 2, 2014	Haleakala	Pan-STARRS 1	·	1.2 km	MPC · JPL
774814	2005 TQ_{207}	—	September 19, 2014	Haleakala	Pan-STARRS 1	·	1.5 km	MPC · JPL
774815	2005 TS_{207}	—	March 12, 2008	Kitt Peak	Spacewatch	EUN	940 m	MPC · JPL
774816	2005 TD_{208}	—	May 15, 2013	Haleakala	Pan-STARRS 1	·	1.3 km	MPC · JPL
774817	2005 TR_{208}	—	October 30, 2014	Mount Lemmon	Mount Lemmon Survey	·	1.4 km	MPC · JPL
774818	2005 TF_{211}	—	August 28, 2014	Kitt Peak	Spacewatch	PAD	1.1 km	MPC · JPL
774819	2005 TK_{212}	—	March 19, 2013	Haleakala	Pan-STARRS 1	·	1.8 km	MPC · JPL
774820	2005 TO_{212}	—	January 14, 2016	Haleakala	Pan-STARRS 1	·	1.2 km	MPC · JPL
774821	2005 TZ_{212}	—	October 6, 2005	Mount Lemmon	Mount Lemmon Survey	·	1.2 km	MPC · JPL
774822	2005 TA_{213}	—	September 18, 2014	Haleakala	Pan-STARRS 1	·	1.0 km	MPC · JPL
774823	2005 TF_{213}	—	September 3, 2013	Mount Lemmon	Mount Lemmon Survey	·	500 m	MPC · JPL
774824	2005 TP_{214}	—	October 2, 2005	Mount Lemmon	Mount Lemmon Survey	·	1.2 km	MPC · JPL
774825	2005 TV_{214}	—	October 1, 2005	Kitt Peak	Spacewatch	·	2.2 km	MPC · JPL
774826	2005 TQ_{215}	—	October 2, 2005	Mount Lemmon	Mount Lemmon Survey	EOS	1.5 km	MPC · JPL
774827	2005 TS_{215}	—	October 9, 2005	Kitt Peak	Spacewatch	·	2.1 km	MPC · JPL
774828	2005 TZ_{216}	—	October 12, 2005	Kitt Peak	Spacewatch	·	1.6 km	MPC · JPL
774829	2005 TZ_{217}	—	October 1, 2005	Kitt Peak	Spacewatch	·	770 m	MPC · JPL
774830	2005 TP_{218}	—	October 2, 2005	Mount Lemmon	Mount Lemmon Survey	·	1.1 km	MPC · JPL
774831	2005 TX_{219}	—	October 1, 2005	Mount Lemmon	Mount Lemmon Survey	·	1.2 km	MPC · JPL
774832	2005 TE_{221}	—	October 11, 2005	Kitt Peak	Spacewatch	·	1.2 km	MPC · JPL
774833	2005 TF_{222}	—	October 1, 2005	Kitt Peak	Spacewatch	·	1.2 km	MPC · JPL
774834	2005 TL_{224}	—	October 1, 2005	Mount Lemmon	Mount Lemmon Survey	·	1.9 km	MPC · JPL
774835	2005 TN_{224}	—	October 4, 2005	Mount Lemmon	Mount Lemmon Survey	(5)	950 m	MPC · JPL
774836	2005 TR_{224}	—	October 1, 2005	Kitt Peak	Spacewatch	·	1.9 km	MPC · JPL
774837	2005 TP_{225}	—	October 1, 2005	Kitt Peak	Spacewatch	·	1.5 km	MPC · JPL
774838	2005 TL_{226}	—	October 1, 2005	Mount Lemmon	Mount Lemmon Survey	·	1.2 km	MPC · JPL
774839	2005 UK_{8}	—	October 25, 2005	Kitt Peak	Spacewatch	·	1.7 km	MPC · JPL
774840	2005 UE_{34}	—	October 24, 2005	Kitt Peak	Spacewatch	·	1.1 km	MPC · JPL
774841	2005 UA_{45}	—	October 22, 2005	Kitt Peak	Spacewatch	AEO	890 m	MPC · JPL
774842	2005 UW_{50}	—	October 23, 2005	Catalina	CSS	·	1.6 km	MPC · JPL
774843	2005 UF_{82}	—	October 1, 2005	Mount Lemmon	Mount Lemmon Survey	·	2.2 km	MPC · JPL
774844	2005 UL_{93}	—	October 22, 2005	Kitt Peak	Spacewatch	·	890 m	MPC · JPL
774845	2005 UU_{136}	—	October 7, 2005	Mount Lemmon	Mount Lemmon Survey	·	1.3 km	MPC · JPL
774846	2005 UP_{137}	—	October 25, 2005	Mount Lemmon	Mount Lemmon Survey	THM	1.8 km	MPC · JPL
774847	2005 UB_{138}	—	October 25, 2005	Mount Lemmon	Mount Lemmon Survey	·	2.0 km	MPC · JPL
774848	2005 UQ_{139}	—	October 25, 2005	Mount Lemmon	Mount Lemmon Survey	·	1.0 km	MPC · JPL
774849	2005 UJ_{140}	—	October 25, 2005	Mount Lemmon	Mount Lemmon Survey	WIT	710 m	MPC · JPL
774850	2005 UY_{143}	—	October 26, 2005	Kitt Peak	Spacewatch	WIT	720 m	MPC · JPL
774851	2005 UR_{146}	—	October 26, 2005	Kitt Peak	Spacewatch	DOR	1.5 km	MPC · JPL
774852	2005 UZ_{162}	—	October 23, 2005	Kitt Peak	Spacewatch	·	810 m	MPC · JPL
774853	2005 UL_{164}	—	October 1, 2005	Mount Lemmon	Mount Lemmon Survey	·	1.5 km	MPC · JPL
774854	2005 UK_{169}	—	October 24, 2005	Kitt Peak	Spacewatch	·	2.3 km	MPC · JPL
774855	2005 UR_{169}	—	October 24, 2005	Kitt Peak	Spacewatch	·	1.4 km	MPC · JPL
774856	2005 UX_{173}	—	October 24, 2005	Kitt Peak	Spacewatch	WIT	670 m	MPC · JPL
774857	2005 UM_{188}	—	October 27, 2005	Mount Lemmon	Mount Lemmon Survey	·	1.3 km	MPC · JPL
774858	2005 UA_{190}	—	October 27, 2005	Mount Lemmon	Mount Lemmon Survey	·	2.3 km	MPC · JPL
774859	2005 UY_{195}	—	October 1, 2005	Mount Lemmon	Mount Lemmon Survey	·	1.5 km	MPC · JPL
774860	2005 UZ_{195}	—	October 24, 2005	Kitt Peak	Spacewatch	·	1.6 km	MPC · JPL
774861	2005 UU_{204}	—	October 26, 2005	Kitt Peak	Spacewatch	·	1.5 km	MPC · JPL
774862	2005 UF_{207}	—	October 27, 2005	Kitt Peak	Spacewatch	·	2.3 km	MPC · JPL
774863	2005 UO_{208}	—	October 1, 2005	Mount Lemmon	Mount Lemmon Survey	·	1.1 km	MPC · JPL
774864	2005 UG_{209}	—	October 27, 2005	Mount Lemmon	Mount Lemmon Survey	·	2.3 km	MPC · JPL
774865	2005 UK_{235}	—	October 25, 2005	Kitt Peak	Spacewatch	·	1.1 km	MPC · JPL
774866	2005 UL_{264}	—	October 1, 2005	Mount Lemmon	Mount Lemmon Survey	·	1.4 km	MPC · JPL
774867	2005 UR_{264}	—	October 7, 2005	Kitt Peak	Spacewatch	·	1.4 km	MPC · JPL
774868	2005 UZ_{279}	—	October 24, 2005	Kitt Peak	Spacewatch	·	1.2 km	MPC · JPL
774869	2005 UM_{285}	—	October 26, 2005	Kitt Peak	Spacewatch	·	1.3 km	MPC · JPL
774870	2005 UM_{290}	—	October 26, 2005	Kitt Peak	Spacewatch	·	1.6 km	MPC · JPL
774871	2005 UP_{311}	—	October 26, 2005	Kitt Peak	Spacewatch	AGN	830 m	MPC · JPL
774872	2005 UV_{320}	—	October 27, 2005	Kitt Peak	Spacewatch	·	2.7 km	MPC · JPL
774873	2005 UC_{323}	—	October 28, 2005	Mount Lemmon	Mount Lemmon Survey	·	870 m	MPC · JPL
774874	2005 UK_{334}	—	October 29, 2005	Mount Lemmon	Mount Lemmon Survey	·	1.5 km	MPC · JPL
774875	2005 UT_{335}	—	October 30, 2005	Kitt Peak	Spacewatch	·	2.0 km	MPC · JPL
774876	2005 UW_{335}	—	October 30, 2005	Mount Lemmon	Mount Lemmon Survey	·	1.0 km	MPC · JPL
774877	2005 UQ_{337}	—	October 31, 2005	Kitt Peak	Spacewatch	·	1.2 km	MPC · JPL
774878	2005 UW_{338}	—	October 31, 2005	Kitt Peak	Spacewatch	·	2.4 km	MPC · JPL
774879	2005 UZ_{338}	—	October 31, 2005	Kitt Peak	Spacewatch	·	980 m	MPC · JPL
774880	2005 UF_{340}	—	October 31, 2005	Kitt Peak	Spacewatch	·	1.4 km	MPC · JPL
774881	2005 UC_{342}	—	October 31, 2005	Mount Lemmon	Mount Lemmon Survey	·	1.5 km	MPC · JPL
774882	2005 UU_{359}	—	October 25, 2005	Mount Lemmon	Mount Lemmon Survey	·	1.3 km	MPC · JPL
774883	2005 UZ_{376}	—	October 27, 2005	Kitt Peak	Spacewatch	·	1.3 km	MPC · JPL
774884	2005 UL_{379}	—	October 1, 2005	Mount Lemmon	Mount Lemmon Survey	·	1.3 km	MPC · JPL
774885	2005 UR_{380}	—	October 22, 2005	Kitt Peak	Spacewatch	·	1.7 km	MPC · JPL
774886	2005 UN_{383}	—	October 22, 2005	Kitt Peak	Spacewatch	·	2.2 km	MPC · JPL
774887	2005 UB_{391}	—	October 29, 2005	Mount Lemmon	Mount Lemmon Survey	·	1.3 km	MPC · JPL
774888	2005 UR_{391}	—	October 30, 2005	Kitt Peak	Spacewatch	KOR	1.0 km	MPC · JPL
774889	2005 UE_{392}	—	October 30, 2005	Kitt Peak	Spacewatch	(12739)	1.3 km	MPC · JPL
774890	2005 UA_{393}	—	October 1, 2005	Kitt Peak	Spacewatch	·	1.1 km	MPC · JPL
774891	2005 UX_{394}	—	October 1, 2005	Kitt Peak	Spacewatch	MRX	700 m	MPC · JPL
774892	2005 UN_{402}	—	October 28, 2005	Catalina	CSS	BRU	1.9 km	MPC · JPL
774893	2005 US_{408}	—	October 1, 2005	Mount Lemmon	Mount Lemmon Survey	·	1.3 km	MPC · JPL
774894	2005 UP_{418}	—	October 25, 2005	Kitt Peak	Spacewatch	·	1.3 km	MPC · JPL
774895	2005 UU_{425}	—	October 28, 2005	Kitt Peak	Spacewatch	·	1.4 km	MPC · JPL
774896	2005 UJ_{431}	—	October 28, 2005	Kitt Peak	Spacewatch	·	1.5 km	MPC · JPL
774897	2005 UO_{437}	—	October 22, 2005	Kitt Peak	Spacewatch	·	1.4 km	MPC · JPL
774898	2005 UX_{463}	—	October 30, 2005	Kitt Peak	Spacewatch	·	1.2 km	MPC · JPL
774899	2005 UG_{465}	—	October 30, 2005	Kitt Peak	Spacewatch	·	1.2 km	MPC · JPL
774900	2005 UG_{466}	—	October 30, 2005	Kitt Peak	Spacewatch	·	1.1 km	MPC · JPL

== 774901–775000 ==
back to top

Designation			Discovery			Properties		Ref
Permanent	Provisional	Named after	Date	Site	Discoverer(s)	Category	Diam.	Ref
774901	2005 UA_{478}	—	October 27, 2005	Kitt Peak	Spacewatch	HOF	1.8 km	MPC · JPL
774902	2005 UB_{503}	—	September 18, 2014	Haleakala	Pan-STARRS 1	AST	1.3 km	MPC · JPL
774903	2005 UN_{515}	—	October 25, 2005	Apache Point	SDSS Collaboration	·	1.9 km	MPC · JPL
774904	2005 UB_{518}	—	October 25, 2005	Apache Point	SDSS Collaboration	·	1.9 km	MPC · JPL
774905	2005 UE_{518}	—	October 30, 2005	Apache Point	SDSS Collaboration	·	2.2 km	MPC · JPL
774906	2005 UE_{524}	—	October 30, 2005	Apache Point	SDSS Collaboration	EOS	1.2 km	MPC · JPL
774907	2005 UM_{534}	—	September 21, 2009	Mount Lemmon	Mount Lemmon Survey	·	820 m	MPC · JPL
774908	2005 UB_{536}	—	April 25, 2015	Haleakala	Pan-STARRS 1	(5651)	2.3 km	MPC · JPL
774909	2005 UZ_{541}	—	April 5, 2008	Kitt Peak	Spacewatch	·	1.7 km	MPC · JPL
774910	2005 UE_{543}	—	November 1, 2005	Mount Lemmon	Mount Lemmon Survey	EUN	980 m	MPC · JPL
774911	2005 UG_{546}	—	April 3, 2017	Haleakala	Pan-STARRS 1	AGN	910 m	MPC · JPL
774912	2005 UM_{546}	—	February 19, 2012	Westfield	International Astronomical Search Collaboration	·	1.2 km	MPC · JPL
774913	2005 US_{546}	—	February 3, 2016	Haleakala	Pan-STARRS 1	·	1.5 km	MPC · JPL
774914	2005 UJ_{547}	—	October 25, 2005	Mount Lemmon	Mount Lemmon Survey	·	1.3 km	MPC · JPL
774915	2005 UX_{547}	—	October 27, 2005	Mount Lemmon	Mount Lemmon Survey	·	1.2 km	MPC · JPL
774916	2005 UM_{548}	—	October 27, 2005	Mount Lemmon	Mount Lemmon Survey	·	1.2 km	MPC · JPL
774917	2005 UR_{550}	—	October 25, 2005	Kitt Peak	Spacewatch	·	1.8 km	MPC · JPL
774918	2005 UV_{550}	—	October 29, 2005	Mount Lemmon	Mount Lemmon Survey	·	1.4 km	MPC · JPL
774919	2005 UU_{551}	—	October 23, 2005	Kitt Peak	Spacewatch	·	2.0 km	MPC · JPL
774920	2005 UL_{554}	—	October 26, 2005	Kitt Peak	Spacewatch	·	2.5 km	MPC · JPL
774921	2005 UQ_{555}	—	October 25, 2005	Kitt Peak	Spacewatch	·	2.0 km	MPC · JPL
774922	2005 UL_{557}	—	October 28, 2005	Kitt Peak	Spacewatch	·	1.2 km	MPC · JPL
774923	2005 UV_{558}	—	October 26, 2005	Kitt Peak	Spacewatch	·	2.3 km	MPC · JPL
774924	2005 UQ_{560}	—	October 31, 2005	Kitt Peak	Spacewatch	·	1.3 km	MPC · JPL
774925	2005 VH_{8}	—	November 1, 2005	Kitt Peak	Spacewatch	·	1.3 km	MPC · JPL
774926	2005 VL_{18}	—	November 1, 2005	Kitt Peak	Spacewatch	AGN	780 m	MPC · JPL
774927	2005 VP_{18}	—	October 1, 2005	Mount Lemmon	Mount Lemmon Survey	·	2.1 km	MPC · JPL
774928	2005 VT_{18}	—	October 7, 2005	Mount Lemmon	Mount Lemmon Survey	·	1.2 km	MPC · JPL
774929	2005 VD_{28}	—	April 24, 2004	Kitt Peak	Spacewatch	JUN	860 m	MPC · JPL
774930	2005 VH_{35}	—	November 3, 2005	Mount Lemmon	Mount Lemmon Survey	·	1.2 km	MPC · JPL
774931	2005 VB_{44}	—	November 3, 2005	Kitt Peak	Spacewatch	·	1.5 km	MPC · JPL
774932	2005 VS_{45}	—	October 28, 2005	Mount Lemmon	Mount Lemmon Survey	WIT	660 m	MPC · JPL
774933	2005 VZ_{48}	—	November 1, 2005	Kitt Peak	Spacewatch	EOS	1.5 km	MPC · JPL
774934	2005 VP_{60}	—	November 5, 2005	Mount Lemmon	Mount Lemmon Survey	HOF	1.8 km	MPC · JPL
774935	2005 VS_{63}	—	November 3, 2005	Kitt Peak	Spacewatch	(5)	830 m	MPC · JPL
774936	2005 VA_{69}	—	October 27, 2005	Kitt Peak	Spacewatch	EUN	990 m	MPC · JPL
774937	2005 VQ_{84}	—	November 4, 2005	Kitt Peak	Spacewatch	PAD	1.2 km	MPC · JPL
774938	2005 VS_{90}	—	November 6, 2005	Kitt Peak	Spacewatch	·	2.1 km	MPC · JPL
774939	2005 VS_{92}	—	November 6, 2005	Mount Lemmon	Mount Lemmon Survey	·	1.2 km	MPC · JPL
774940	2005 VV_{92}	—	November 6, 2005	Mount Lemmon	Mount Lemmon Survey	HOF	1.7 km	MPC · JPL
774941	2005 VH_{109}	—	October 29, 2005	Kitt Peak	Spacewatch	ELF	2.9 km	MPC · JPL
774942	2005 VK_{128}	—	October 30, 2005	Apache Point	SDSS Collaboration	·	1.8 km	MPC · JPL
774943	2005 VJ_{133}	—	October 30, 2005	Apache Point	SDSS Collaboration	·	2.0 km	MPC · JPL
774944	2005 VD_{136}	—	November 10, 2005	Kitt Peak	Spacewatch	·	2.4 km	MPC · JPL
774945	2005 VF_{137}	—	January 25, 2020	Mount Lemmon	Mount Lemmon Survey	·	1.2 km	MPC · JPL
774946	2005 VG_{141}	—	September 27, 2009	Kitt Peak	Spacewatch	·	870 m	MPC · JPL
774947	2005 VA_{143}	—	November 10, 2005	Kitt Peak	Spacewatch	EUN	860 m	MPC · JPL
774948	2005 VT_{143}	—	December 2, 2010	Kitt Peak	Spacewatch	·	1.2 km	MPC · JPL
774949	2005 VB_{145}	—	August 20, 2014	Haleakala	Pan-STARRS 1	·	1.3 km	MPC · JPL
774950	2005 VD_{145}	—	January 17, 2016	Haleakala	Pan-STARRS 1	DOR	1.3 km	MPC · JPL
774951	2005 VK_{145}	—	July 25, 2014	Haleakala	Pan-STARRS 1	KOR	1.0 km	MPC · JPL
774952	2005 VO_{148}	—	March 10, 2008	Kitt Peak	Spacewatch	EUN	890 m	MPC · JPL
774953	2005 VX_{148}	—	November 6, 2005	Mount Lemmon	Mount Lemmon Survey	·	1.1 km	MPC · JPL
774954	2005 VY_{149}	—	August 28, 2014	Haleakala	Pan-STARRS 1	KOR	890 m	MPC · JPL
774955	2005 VD_{150}	—	January 27, 2007	Mount Lemmon	Mount Lemmon Survey	·	1.2 km	MPC · JPL
774956	2005 VH_{150}	—	March 1, 2016	Haleakala	Pan-STARRS 1	AEO	930 m	MPC · JPL
774957	2005 VJ_{150}	—	October 1, 2014	Mount Lemmon	Mount Lemmon Survey	·	1.2 km	MPC · JPL
774958	2005 VX_{151}	—	November 1, 2005	Kitt Peak	Spacewatch	WAT	950 m	MPC · JPL
774959	2005 VW_{153}	—	November 6, 2005	Mount Lemmon	Mount Lemmon Survey	GEF	830 m	MPC · JPL
774960	2005 VL_{154}	—	November 1, 2005	Kitt Peak	Spacewatch	·	1.1 km	MPC · JPL
774961	2005 VJ_{157}	—	November 1, 2005	Mount Lemmon	Mount Lemmon Survey	·	1.0 km	MPC · JPL
774962	2005 VT_{157}	—	November 10, 2005	Kitt Peak	Spacewatch	·	1.3 km	MPC · JPL
774963	2005 WP_{41}	—	October 25, 2005	Mount Lemmon	Mount Lemmon Survey	·	2.7 km	MPC · JPL
774964	2005 WQ_{53}	—	November 25, 2005	Mount Lemmon	Mount Lemmon Survey	LUT	2.9 km	MPC · JPL
774965	2005 WQ_{69}	—	November 26, 2005	Kitt Peak	Spacewatch	·	1.3 km	MPC · JPL
774966	2005 WU_{82}	—	October 27, 2005	Mount Lemmon	Mount Lemmon Survey	·	1.4 km	MPC · JPL
774967	2005 WZ_{91}	—	November 25, 2005	Kitt Peak	Spacewatch	AEO	720 m	MPC · JPL
774968	2005 WJ_{93}	—	November 25, 2005	Mount Lemmon	Mount Lemmon Survey	DOR	1.6 km	MPC · JPL
774969	2005 WA_{112}	—	September 30, 2005	Mount Lemmon	Mount Lemmon Survey	·	1.5 km	MPC · JPL
774970	2005 WV_{124}	—	November 25, 2005	Kitt Peak	Spacewatch	KOR	1.0 km	MPC · JPL
774971	2005 WH_{127}	—	October 28, 2005	Mount Lemmon	Mount Lemmon Survey	·	2.5 km	MPC · JPL
774972	2005 WD_{131}	—	November 25, 2005	Mount Lemmon	Mount Lemmon Survey	·	2.3 km	MPC · JPL
774973	2005 WV_{133}	—	November 25, 2005	Mount Lemmon	Mount Lemmon Survey	KRM	1.7 km	MPC · JPL
774974	2005 WJ_{175}	—	November 30, 2005	Kitt Peak	Spacewatch	(5)	720 m	MPC · JPL
774975	2005 WW_{197}	—	November 22, 2005	Kitt Peak	Spacewatch	GEF	790 m	MPC · JPL
774976	2005 WB_{199}	—	November 25, 2005	Kitt Peak	Spacewatch	·	1.5 km	MPC · JPL
774977	2005 WQ_{209}	—	November 25, 2005	Mauna Kea	P. A. Wiegert, D. D. Balam	THB	2.1 km	MPC · JPL
774978	2005 WY_{217}	—	November 26, 2005	Kitt Peak	Spacewatch	·	1.2 km	MPC · JPL
774979	2005 XC_{39}	—	December 5, 2005	Mount Lemmon	Mount Lemmon Survey	AGN	820 m	MPC · JPL
774980	2005 XB_{40}	—	November 30, 2005	Kitt Peak	Spacewatch	·	1.6 km	MPC · JPL
774981	2005 XW_{40}	—	December 5, 2005	Kitt Peak	Spacewatch	·	1.5 km	MPC · JPL
774982	2005 XU_{41}	—	December 7, 2005	Kitt Peak	Spacewatch	·	2.4 km	MPC · JPL
774983	2005 XE_{47}	—	December 2, 2005	Kitt Peak	Spacewatch	·	940 m	MPC · JPL
774984	2005 XP_{62}	—	December 5, 2005	Mount Lemmon	Mount Lemmon Survey	AGN	850 m	MPC · JPL
774985	2005 XY_{93}	—	December 1, 2005	Kitt Peak	Wasserman, L. H., Millis, R. L.	THM	2.0 km	MPC · JPL
774986	2005 XV_{94}	—	October 1, 2005	Mount Lemmon	Mount Lemmon Survey	·	990 m	MPC · JPL
774987	2005 XX_{94}	—	October 5, 2005	Kitt Peak	Spacewatch	·	1.2 km	MPC · JPL
774988	2005 XS_{119}	—	December 4, 2005	Mount Lemmon	Mount Lemmon Survey	·	1.3 km	MPC · JPL
774989	2005 XO_{124}	—	January 14, 2011	Kitt Peak	Spacewatch	·	1.3 km	MPC · JPL
774990	2005 XQ_{124}	—	December 4, 2005	Mount Lemmon	Mount Lemmon Survey	·	1.3 km	MPC · JPL
774991	2005 XW_{124}	—	December 2, 2005	Kitt Peak	Spacewatch	·	1.4 km	MPC · JPL
774992	2005 XM_{126}	—	November 1, 2014	Kitt Peak	Spacewatch	AGN	870 m	MPC · JPL
774993	2005 XL_{127}	—	September 20, 2014	Haleakala	Pan-STARRS 1	·	1.3 km	MPC · JPL
774994	2005 XX_{127}	—	September 15, 2009	Kitt Peak	Spacewatch	·	1.3 km	MPC · JPL
774995	2005 XL_{128}	—	October 27, 2014	Haleakala	Pan-STARRS 1	(18466)	1.6 km	MPC · JPL
774996	2005 XJ_{131}	—	March 23, 2012	Mount Lemmon	Mount Lemmon Survey	·	1.3 km	MPC · JPL
774997	2005 XB_{132}	—	April 1, 2017	Haleakala	Pan-STARRS 1	·	1.3 km	MPC · JPL
774998	2005 XK_{132}	—	December 6, 2005	Kitt Peak	Spacewatch	·	1.4 km	MPC · JPL
774999	2005 XP_{134}	—	December 2, 2005	Mount Lemmon	Mount Lemmon Survey	·	1.5 km	MPC · JPL
775000	2005 XZ_{135}	—	December 4, 2005	Kitt Peak	Spacewatch	VER	2.0 km	MPC · JPL

back to top
