= List of minor planets: 841001–842000 =

The following is a partial list of minor planets, running from minor-planet number 841001 through 842000, inclusive. The primary data for this and other partial lists is based on JPL's "Small-Body Orbital Elements" and data available from the Minor Planet Center. Critical list information is also provided by the MPC, unless otherwise specified from Lowell Observatory. A detailed description of the table's columns and additional sources are given on the main page including a complete list of every page in this series, and a statistical break-up on the dynamical classification of minor planets.

Also see the summary list of all named bodies in numerical and alphabetical order, and the corresponding naming citations for the number range of this particular list. New namings may only be added to this list after official publication, as the preannouncement of names is condemned by the Working Group for Small Bodies Nomenclature of the International Astronomical Union.

Near-Earth obj.	MBA (inner)	MBA (outer)	Centaur
Mars-crosser	MBA (middle)	Jupiter trojan	Trans-Neptunian obj.
Unclassified

== 841001–841100 ==
Designation			Discovery			Properties		Ref
Permanent	Provisional	Named after	Date	Site	Discoverer(s)	Category	Diam.	Ref
841001	2015 FB_{143}	—	March 21, 2015	Haleakala	Pan-STARRS 1	·	2.0 km	MPC · JPL
841002	2015 FC_{146}	—	February 26, 2015	Mount Lemmon	Mount Lemmon Survey	·	1.2 km	MPC · JPL
841003	2015 FE_{148}	—	March 21, 2015	Haleakala	Pan-STARRS 1	·	440 m	MPC · JPL
841004	2015 FU_{148}	—	April 4, 2010	WISE	WISE	·	1.7 km	MPC · JPL
841005	2015 FX_{148}	—	March 17, 2010	WISE	WISE	·	1.3 km	MPC · JPL
841006	2015 FS_{150}	—	October 11, 2012	Mount Lemmon	Mount Lemmon Survey	·	970 m	MPC · JPL
841007	2015 FA_{154}	—	January 13, 2011	Kitt Peak	Spacewatch	·	700 m	MPC · JPL
841008	2015 FC_{156}	—	February 8, 2011	Mount Lemmon	Mount Lemmon Survey	NYS	780 m	MPC · JPL
841009	2015 FP_{156}	—	November 9, 2013	Haleakala	Pan-STARRS 1	·	790 m	MPC · JPL
841010	2015 FJ_{157}	—	March 29, 2010	WISE	WISE	·	1.2 km	MPC · JPL
841011	2015 FP_{158}	—	October 23, 2013	Haleakala	Pan-STARRS 1	·	970 m	MPC · JPL
841012	2015 FX_{161}	—	March 21, 2015	Haleakala	Pan-STARRS 1	·	1.4 km	MPC · JPL
841013	2015 FG_{164}	—	March 21, 2015	Haleakala	Pan-STARRS 1	·	760 m	MPC · JPL
841014	2015 FY_{166}	—	March 21, 2015	Haleakala	Pan-STARRS 1	ELF	2.5 km	MPC · JPL
841015	2015 FF_{169}	—	March 17, 2015	Mount Lemmon	Mount Lemmon Survey	·	570 m	MPC · JPL
841016	2015 FN_{175}	—	May 5, 2010	WISE	WISE	·	1.5 km	MPC · JPL
841017	2015 FH_{177}	—	November 11, 2013	Kitt Peak	Spacewatch	·	1.5 km	MPC · JPL
841018	2015 FV_{180}	—	January 19, 2015	Haleakala	Pan-STARRS 1	·	1 km	MPC · JPL
841019	2015 FB_{181}	—	January 3, 2009	Mount Lemmon	Mount Lemmon Survey	·	1.9 km	MPC · JPL
841020	2015 FO_{181}	—	October 29, 2002	Sacramento Peak	SDSS	·	1.7 km	MPC · JPL
841021	2015 FR_{186}	—	January 28, 2010	WISE	WISE	·	2.6 km	MPC · JPL
841022	2015 FT_{188}	—	March 22, 2015	Haleakala	Pan-STARRS 1	·	2.0 km	MPC · JPL
841023	2015 FB_{192}	—	March 22, 2015	Haleakala	Pan-STARRS 1	·	1.6 km	MPC · JPL
841024	2015 FG_{192}	—	January 6, 2003	Kitt Peak	Deep Lens Survey	T_{j} (2.99)	3.5 km	MPC · JPL
841025	2015 FH_{192}	—	February 4, 2010	WISE	WISE	·	2.8 km	MPC · JPL
841026	2015 FD_{193}	—	January 23, 2015	Haleakala	Pan-STARRS 1	·	1.3 km	MPC · JPL
841027	2015 FY_{198}	—	February 24, 2015	Haleakala	Pan-STARRS 1	·	510 m	MPC · JPL
841028	2015 FK_{200}	—	March 11, 2015	Kitt Peak	Spacewatch	·	1.2 km	MPC · JPL
841029	2015 FV_{201}	—	November 1, 2008	Mount Lemmon	Mount Lemmon Survey	·	1.3 km	MPC · JPL
841030	2015 FZ_{205}	—	February 14, 2010	WISE	WISE	·	5.0 km	MPC · JPL
841031	2015 FA_{209}	—	November 27, 2014	Haleakala	Pan-STARRS 1	·	1.2 km	MPC · JPL
841032	2015 FV_{212}	—	May 13, 2010	WISE	WISE	DOR	2.2 km	MPC · JPL
841033	2015 FT_{214}	—	October 24, 2009	Mount Lemmon	Mount Lemmon Survey	(5)	930 m	MPC · JPL
841034	2015 FL_{215}	—	May 14, 2004	Sacramento Peak	SDSS	·	2.6 km	MPC · JPL
841035	2015 FN_{215}	—	February 18, 2015	Haleakala	Pan-STARRS 1	·	540 m	MPC · JPL
841036	2015 FG_{220}	—	March 23, 2015	Haleakala	Pan-STARRS 1	·	1.2 km	MPC · JPL
841037	2015 FJ_{222}	—	August 11, 2012	Mayhill-ISON	L. Elenin	·	1.0 km	MPC · JPL
841038	2015 FB_{223}	—	March 18, 2010	Kitt Peak	Spacewatch	·	2.0 km	MPC · JPL
841039	2015 FF_{223}	—	March 23, 2015	Haleakala	Pan-STARRS 1	·	1.3 km	MPC · JPL
841040	2015 FA_{227}	—	March 23, 2015	Haleakala	Pan-STARRS 1	·	780 m	MPC · JPL
841041	2015 FE_{229}	—	November 26, 2009	Kitt Peak	Spacewatch	·	1.2 km	MPC · JPL
841042	2015 FY_{235}	—	October 25, 2012	Mount Lemmon	Mount Lemmon Survey	·	1.8 km	MPC · JPL
841043	2015 FV_{241}	—	April 15, 2010	Kitt Peak	Spacewatch	·	2.0 km	MPC · JPL
841044	2015 FA_{243}	—	May 21, 2012	Haleakala	Pan-STARRS 1	·	560 m	MPC · JPL
841045	2015 FH_{244}	—	December 21, 2008	Mount Lemmon	Mount Lemmon Survey	·	1.9 km	MPC · JPL
841046	2015 FO_{245}	—	November 7, 2008	Mount Lemmon	Mount Lemmon Survey	·	1.3 km	MPC · JPL
841047	2015 FN_{248}	—	March 21, 1999	Sacramento Peak	SDSS	·	1.2 km	MPC · JPL
841048	2015 FN_{249}	—	March 21, 1999	Sacramento Peak	SDSS	·	2.4 km	MPC · JPL
841049	2015 FO_{253}	—	October 10, 2008	Kitt Peak	Spacewatch	·	1.2 km	MPC · JPL
841050	2015 FK_{256}	—	May 20, 2010	Mount Lemmon	Mount Lemmon Survey	·	1.6 km	MPC · JPL
841051	2015 FR_{258}	—	March 23, 2015	Haleakala	Pan-STARRS 1	·	600 m	MPC · JPL
841052	2015 FF_{262}	—	October 9, 2013	Mount Lemmon	Mount Lemmon Survey	MAS	590 m	MPC · JPL
841053	2015 FH_{267}	—	July 28, 2010	WISE	WISE	·	1.9 km	MPC · JPL
841054	2015 FH_{269}	—	September 14, 2006	Catalina	CSS	T_{j} (2.99)	3.3 km	MPC · JPL
841055	2015 FR_{270}	—	February 18, 2015	Haleakala	Pan-STARRS 1	·	1.3 km	MPC · JPL
841056	2015 FJ_{272}	—	October 4, 2013	Haleakala	Pan-STARRS 1	EUN	810 m	MPC · JPL
841057	2015 FD_{279}	—	March 24, 2015	Haleakala	Pan-STARRS 1	·	1.1 km	MPC · JPL
841058	2015 FO_{282}	—	January 19, 2015	Haleakala	Pan-STARRS 1	·	480 m	MPC · JPL
841059	2015 FR_{282}	—	January 28, 2015	Haleakala	Pan-STARRS 1	TEL	1.2 km	MPC · JPL
841060	2015 FB_{283}	—	January 23, 2015	Haleakala	Pan-STARRS 1	·	1.9 km	MPC · JPL
841061	2015 FL_{283}	—	June 24, 2010	WISE	WISE	·	2.5 km	MPC · JPL
841062	2015 FK_{285}	—	April 12, 2010	Mount Lemmon	Mount Lemmon Survey	·	2.3 km	MPC · JPL
841063	2015 FD_{286}	—	March 25, 2015	Haleakala	Pan-STARRS 1	·	930 m	MPC · JPL
841064	2015 FH_{286}	—	February 16, 2015	Haleakala	Pan-STARRS 1	·	1.7 km	MPC · JPL
841065	2015 FK_{289}	—	September 26, 2000	Sacramento Peak	SDSS	EUN	1.2 km	MPC · JPL
841066	2015 FQ_{289}	—	May 11, 2010	WISE	WISE	·	2.3 km	MPC · JPL
841067	2015 FS_{291}	—	December 31, 2008	Kitt Peak	Spacewatch	·	2.4 km	MPC · JPL
841068	2015 FJ_{292}	—	January 15, 2010	Kitt Peak	Spacewatch	·	1.7 km	MPC · JPL
841069	2015 FM_{292}	—	November 21, 2008	Mount Lemmon	Mount Lemmon Survey	·	3.5 km	MPC · JPL
841070	2015 FA_{296}	—	September 15, 2012	Mount Lemmon	Mount Lemmon Survey	·	960 m	MPC · JPL
841071	2015 FL_{297}	—	April 21, 2010	WISE	WISE	LIX	3.4 km	MPC · JPL
841072	2015 FF_{299}	—	October 10, 2002	Sacramento Peak	SDSS	·	2.0 km	MPC · JPL
841073	2015 FZ_{300}	—	March 2, 2009	Mount Lemmon	Mount Lemmon Survey	LIX	2.7 km	MPC · JPL
841074	2015 FO_{306}	—	March 24, 2015	Haleakala	Pan-STARRS 1	·	1.4 km	MPC · JPL
841075	2015 FN_{308}	—	November 1, 2007	Mount Lemmon	Mount Lemmon Survey	EMA	2.0 km	MPC · JPL
841076	2015 FW_{312}	—	November 9, 2013	Catalina	CSS	·	1.5 km	MPC · JPL
841077	2015 FH_{313}	—	March 25, 2015	Haleakala	Pan-STARRS 1	·	2.5 km	MPC · JPL
841078	2015 FO_{313}	—	April 13, 2002	Palomar	NEAT	·	1.2 km	MPC · JPL
841079	2015 FS_{313}	—	May 27, 2006	Kitt Peak	Spacewatch	DOR	1.3 km	MPC · JPL
841080	2015 FD_{314}	—	January 29, 2003	Sacramento Peak	SDSS	·	2.3 km	MPC · JPL
841081	2015 FD_{316}	—	March 25, 2015	Haleakala	Pan-STARRS 1	·	940 m	MPC · JPL
841082	2015 FY_{317}	—	February 5, 2010	WISE	WISE	·	930 m	MPC · JPL
841083	2015 FZ_{318}	—	March 25, 2015	Haleakala	Pan-STARRS 1	·	490 m	MPC · JPL
841084	2015 FS_{319}	—	March 25, 2015	Haleakala	Pan-STARRS 1	·	1.3 km	MPC · JPL
841085	2015 FT_{319}	—	March 25, 2015	Haleakala	Pan-STARRS 1	·	2.5 km	MPC · JPL
841086	2015 FX_{319}	—	January 6, 2010	Kitt Peak	Spacewatch	·	1.3 km	MPC · JPL
841087	2015 FV_{320}	—	March 11, 2008	Mount Lemmon	Mount Lemmon Survey	·	570 m	MPC · JPL
841088	2015 FJ_{321}	—	August 13, 2012	Haleakala	Pan-STARRS 1	·	1.3 km	MPC · JPL
841089	2015 FF_{322}	—	April 1, 2003	Sacramento Peak	SDSS	·	850 m	MPC · JPL
841090	2015 FA_{324}	—	March 25, 2015	Haleakala	Pan-STARRS 1	·	1.0 km	MPC · JPL
841091	2015 FW_{325}	—	March 25, 2015	Haleakala	Pan-STARRS 1	·	1.0 km	MPC · JPL
841092	2015 FB_{334}	—	March 30, 2015	Haleakala	Pan-STARRS 1	·	2.6 km	MPC · JPL
841093	2015 FJ_{335}	—	October 15, 2012	Haleakala	Pan-STARRS 1	ERI	1.1 km	MPC · JPL
841094	2015 FK_{338}	—	April 8, 2010	WISE	WISE	·	2.7 km	MPC · JPL
841095	2015 FN_{339}	—	January 30, 2010	WISE	WISE	·	1.3 km	MPC · JPL
841096	2015 FJ_{341}	—	January 14, 2010	WISE	WISE	·	2.4 km	MPC · JPL
841097	2015 FW_{343}	—	June 17, 2010	WISE	WISE	·	2.8 km	MPC · JPL
841098	2015 FY_{347}	—	August 5, 2010	WISE	WISE	·	2.8 km	MPC · JPL
841099	2015 FG_{349}	—	October 29, 2006	Kitt Peak	Spacewatch	H	250 m	MPC · JPL
841100	2015 FF_{350}	—	January 16, 2013	Haleakala	Pan-STARRS 1	L4	6.0 km	MPC · JPL

== 841101–841200 ==
back to top

Designation			Discovery			Properties		Ref
Permanent	Provisional	Named after	Date	Site	Discoverer(s)	Category	Diam.	Ref
841101	2015 FZ_{354}	—	April 5, 2008	Mount Lemmon	Mount Lemmon Survey	·	530 m	MPC · JPL
841102	2015 FV_{356}	—	May 24, 2010	WISE	WISE	·	3.6 km	MPC · JPL
841103	2015 FX_{358}	—	April 15, 2010	Kitt Peak	Spacewatch	·	1.9 km	MPC · JPL
841104	2015 FW_{362}	—	February 15, 2010	Kitt Peak	Spacewatch	·	2.7 km	MPC · JPL
841105	2015 FV_{364}	—	February 14, 2010	WISE	WISE	·	4.6 km	MPC · JPL
841106	2015 FT_{365}	—	January 26, 2015	Haleakala	Pan-STARRS 1	EUN	990 m	MPC · JPL
841107	2015 FU_{368}	—	May 18, 2010	WISE	WISE	·	1.7 km	MPC · JPL
841108	2015 FX_{369}	—	January 21, 2009	Mount Lemmon	Mount Lemmon Survey	·	3.1 km	MPC · JPL
841109	2015 FJ_{372}	—	October 27, 2009	Mount Lemmon	Mount Lemmon Survey	EUN	770 m	MPC · JPL
841110	2015 FN_{374}	—	March 18, 2015	Haleakala	Pan-STARRS 1	·	1.3 km	MPC · JPL
841111	2015 FX_{374}	—	July 14, 2004	Socorro	LINEAR	·	2.6 km	MPC · JPL
841112	2015 FP_{376}	—	January 16, 2015	Haleakala	Pan-STARRS 1	EUN	810 m	MPC · JPL
841113	2015 FF_{379}	—	February 15, 2010	Mount Lemmon	Mount Lemmon Survey	·	1.7 km	MPC · JPL
841114	2015 FG_{380}	—	July 5, 2010	WISE	WISE	·	2.0 km	MPC · JPL
841115	2015 FP_{381}	—	February 3, 2009	Kitt Peak	Spacewatch	·	2.6 km	MPC · JPL
841116	2015 FR_{385}	—	May 24, 2010	WISE	WISE	·	2.2 km	MPC · JPL
841117	2015 FA_{386}	—	March 20, 2015	Haleakala	Pan-STARRS 1	·	1.3 km	MPC · JPL
841118	2015 FZ_{392}	—	March 22, 2015	Mount Lemmon	Mount Lemmon Survey	H	410 m	MPC · JPL
841119	2015 FH_{395}	—	April 19, 2009	Kitt Peak	Spacewatch	T_{j} (2.97)	4.4 km	MPC · JPL
841120	2015 FS_{395}	—	April 27, 2010	WISE	WISE	T_{j} (2.98)	3.3 km	MPC · JPL
841121	2015 FD_{396}	—	April 18, 2010	WISE	WISE	·	2.3 km	MPC · JPL
841122	2015 FO_{397}	—	March 16, 2007	Mount Lemmon	Mount Lemmon Survey	·	900 m	MPC · JPL
841123	2015 FR_{405}	—	December 1, 2005	Kitt Peak	L. H. Wasserman, R. L. Millis	EUN	880 m	MPC · JPL
841124	2015 FH_{411}	—	January 21, 2015	Haleakala	Pan-STARRS 1	·	2.0 km	MPC · JPL
841125	2015 FQ_{413}	—	March 30, 2010	WISE	WISE	·	1.2 km	MPC · JPL
841126	2015 FU_{415}	—	February 18, 2010	Kitt Peak	Spacewatch	·	1.7 km	MPC · JPL
841127	2015 FH_{416}	—	March 17, 2015	Haleakala	Pan-STARRS 1	·	490 m	MPC · JPL
841128	2015 FV_{416}	—	May 20, 2010	WISE	WISE	(895)	2.3 km	MPC · JPL
841129	2015 FY_{416}	—	April 3, 2010	WISE	WISE	·	2.4 km	MPC · JPL
841130	2015 FV_{417}	—	May 4, 2010	WISE	WISE	·	2.5 km	MPC · JPL
841131	2015 FE_{418}	—	March 29, 2015	Haleakala	Pan-STARRS 1	BRA	1.3 km	MPC · JPL
841132	2015 FF_{419}	—	March 22, 2015	Haleakala	Pan-STARRS 1	GEF	710 m	MPC · JPL
841133	2015 FL_{424}	—	March 27, 2010	WISE	WISE	·	2.2 km	MPC · JPL
841134	2015 FW_{424}	—	March 25, 2015	Haleakala	Pan-STARRS 1	·	1.3 km	MPC · JPL
841135	2015 FY_{424}	—	March 30, 2015	Haleakala	Pan-STARRS 1	KON	1.4 km	MPC · JPL
841136	2015 FU_{426}	—	March 31, 2015	Haleakala	Pan-STARRS 1	·	1.7 km	MPC · JPL
841137	2015 FL_{427}	—	March 27, 2015	Kitt Peak	Spacewatch	·	660 m	MPC · JPL
841138	2015 FY_{428}	—	March 31, 2015	Haleakala	Pan-STARRS 1	H	360 m	MPC · JPL
841139	2015 FQ_{429}	—	October 17, 2012	Haleakala	Pan-STARRS 1	·	970 m	MPC · JPL
841140	2015 FO_{430}	—	March 27, 2015	Kitt Peak	Spacewatch	·	480 m	MPC · JPL
841141	2015 FR_{431}	—	March 30, 2011	Mount Lemmon	Mount Lemmon Survey	·	690 m	MPC · JPL
841142	2015 FD_{432}	—	March 30, 2015	Haleakala	Pan-STARRS 1	DOR	1.6 km	MPC · JPL
841143	2015 FN_{434}	—	March 22, 2015	Haleakala	Pan-STARRS 1	3:2 · SHU	5.1 km	MPC · JPL
841144	2015 FV_{434}	—	March 17, 2015	Haleakala	Pan-STARRS 1	·	1.3 km	MPC · JPL
841145	2015 FF_{435}	—	March 29, 2015	Haleakala	Pan-STARRS 1	·	900 m	MPC · JPL
841146	2015 FB_{436}	—	March 24, 2015	Kitt Peak	Spacewatch	·	1.1 km	MPC · JPL
841147	2015 FV_{437}	—	March 24, 2015	Kitt Peak	Spacewatch	·	1.1 km	MPC · JPL
841148	2015 FQ_{441}	—	March 22, 2015	Haleakala	Pan-STARRS 1	L4	5.2 km	MPC · JPL
841149	2015 FK_{444}	—	March 17, 2015	Haleakala	Pan-STARRS 1	·	860 m	MPC · JPL
841150	2015 FO_{447}	—	September 6, 2008	Mount Lemmon	Mount Lemmon Survey	·	1.2 km	MPC · JPL
841151	2015 FB_{451}	—	January 28, 2015	Haleakala	Pan-STARRS 1	·	1.1 km	MPC · JPL
841152	2015 FW_{451}	—	March 17, 2015	Mount Lemmon	Mount Lemmon Survey	·	1.2 km	MPC · JPL
841153	2015 FM_{453}	—	March 22, 2015	Mount Lemmon	Mount Lemmon Survey	·	1.1 km	MPC · JPL
841154	2015 FL_{457}	—	March 21, 2015	Haleakala	Pan-STARRS 1	·	740 m	MPC · JPL
841155	2015 FO_{457}	—	March 17, 2015	Haleakala	Pan-STARRS 1	MAS	540 m	MPC · JPL
841156	2015 FC_{460}	—	March 28, 2015	Haleakala	Pan-STARRS 1	·	1.5 km	MPC · JPL
841157	2015 FK_{471}	—	March 24, 2015	Haleakala	Pan-STARRS 1	·	1.3 km	MPC · JPL
841158	2015 FZ_{485}	—	March 23, 2015	Kitt Peak	Spacewatch	·	480 m	MPC · JPL
841159	2015 GK_{1}	—	May 1, 2003	Sacramento Peak	SDSS	H	430 m	MPC · JPL
841160	2015 GP_{1}	—	September 16, 2013	Mount Lemmon	Mount Lemmon Survey	·	2.9 km	MPC · JPL
841161	2015 GH_{3}	—	March 17, 2010	WISE	WISE	·	2.7 km	MPC · JPL
841162	2015 GL_{5}	—	April 10, 2010	Mount Lemmon	Mount Lemmon Survey	·	2.3 km	MPC · JPL
841163	2015 GS_{10}	—	April 15, 2010	WISE	WISE	·	1.6 km	MPC · JPL
841164	2015 GD_{12}	—	March 16, 2015	Haleakala	Pan-STARRS 1	·	1.4 km	MPC · JPL
841165	2015 GP_{14}	—	February 12, 2011	Mount Lemmon	Mount Lemmon Survey	NYS	810 m	MPC · JPL
841166	2015 GB_{16}	—	March 15, 2008	Mount Lemmon	Mount Lemmon Survey	·	710 m	MPC · JPL
841167	2015 GA_{18}	—	March 6, 2006	Kitt Peak	Spacewatch	·	1.3 km	MPC · JPL
841168	2015 GQ_{20}	—	September 20, 2009	Mount Lemmon	Mount Lemmon Survey	·	560 m	MPC · JPL
841169	2015 GO_{21}	—	April 13, 2008	Kitt Peak	Spacewatch	·	730 m	MPC · JPL
841170	2015 GZ_{21}	—	July 2, 2010	WISE	WISE	·	1.6 km	MPC · JPL
841171	2015 GL_{24}	—	April 11, 2010	WISE	WISE	T_{j} (2.98)	4.5 km	MPC · JPL
841172	2015 GN_{28}	—	March 21, 2015	Haleakala	Pan-STARRS 1	H	370 m	MPC · JPL
841173	2015 GG_{35}	—	March 19, 2015	Haleakala	Pan-STARRS 1	·	1.6 km	MPC · JPL
841174	2015 GD_{39}	—	October 4, 2002	Sacramento Peak	SDSS	V	620 m	MPC · JPL
841175	2015 GZ_{39}	—	April 16, 2010	WISE	WISE	·	1.4 km	MPC · JPL
841176	2015 GD_{41}	—	January 25, 2015	Haleakala	Pan-STARRS 1	·	1.2 km	MPC · JPL
841177	2015 GG_{41}	—	February 18, 2010	WISE	WISE	·	1.6 km	MPC · JPL
841178	2015 GS_{45}	—	March 21, 2015	Haleakala	Pan-STARRS 1	·	1.1 km	MPC · JPL
841179	2015 GY_{45}	—	January 25, 2012	Haleakala	Pan-STARRS 1	H	450 m	MPC · JPL
841180	2015 GH_{47}	—	April 11, 2011	Mount Lemmon	Mount Lemmon Survey	EUN	650 m	MPC · JPL
841181	2015 GK_{49}	—	March 27, 2015	Haleakala	Pan-STARRS 1	·	1.1 km	MPC · JPL
841182	2015 GV_{50}	—	April 15, 2015	Kitt Peak	Research and Education Collaborative Occultation Network	H	390 m	MPC · JPL
841183	2015 GD_{51}	—	April 1, 2015	Mount Lemmon	Mount Lemmon Survey	H	410 m	MPC · JPL
841184	2015 GD_{53}	—	April 12, 2015	Haleakala	Pan-STARRS 1	EUN	860 m	MPC · JPL
841185	2015 GF_{53}	—	April 12, 2015	Haleakala	Pan-STARRS 1	·	1.4 km	MPC · JPL
841186	2015 GF_{60}	—	April 11, 2015	Kitt Peak	Spacewatch	·	1.2 km	MPC · JPL
841187	2015 GQ_{63}	—	April 10, 2015	Mount Lemmon	Mount Lemmon Survey	·	820 m	MPC · JPL
841188	2015 GW_{63}	—	April 15, 2015	Mount Lemmon	Mount Lemmon Survey	·	860 m	MPC · JPL
841189	2015 GG_{64}	—	April 14, 2015	Mount Lemmon	Mount Lemmon Survey	·	1.3 km	MPC · JPL
841190	2015 GG_{69}	—	April 10, 2015	Mount Lemmon	Mount Lemmon Survey	·	580 m	MPC · JPL
841191	2015 GB_{75}	—	April 10, 2015	Mount Lemmon	Mount Lemmon Survey	·	2.2 km	MPC · JPL
841192	2015 GQ_{87}	—	April 13, 2015	Haleakala	Pan-STARRS 1	·	1.8 km	MPC · JPL
841193	2015 HU_{1}	—	September 9, 2008	Mount Lemmon	Mount Lemmon Survey	H	320 m	MPC · JPL
841194	2015 HY_{7}	—	January 19, 2015	Haleakala	Pan-STARRS 1	V	500 m	MPC · JPL
841195	2015 HW_{8}	—	February 13, 2011	Mount Lemmon	Mount Lemmon Survey	·	1.1 km	MPC · JPL
841196	2015 HM_{12}	—	March 13, 2010	Catalina	CSS	·	1.8 km	MPC · JPL
841197	2015 HF_{14}	—	October 23, 2013	Haleakala	Pan-STARRS 1	H	480 m	MPC · JPL
841198	2015 HS_{14}	—	April 19, 2015	Mount Lemmon	Mount Lemmon Survey	(194)	1.3 km	MPC · JPL
841199	2015 HK_{16}	—	March 21, 1999	Sacramento Peak	SDSS	·	2.0 km	MPC · JPL
841200	2015 HE_{17}	—	March 22, 2015	Haleakala	Pan-STARRS 1	DOR	1.7 km	MPC · JPL

== 841201–841300 ==
back to top

Designation			Discovery			Properties		Ref
Permanent	Provisional	Named after	Date	Site	Discoverer(s)	Category	Diam.	Ref
841201	2015 HJ_{18}	—	March 29, 1998	Piszkés-tető	Kelemen, J.	·	3.5 km	MPC · JPL
841202	2015 HK_{22}	—	March 25, 2015	Haleakala	Pan-STARRS 1	·	1.4 km	MPC · JPL
841203	2015 HX_{23}	—	February 14, 2010	Mount Lemmon	Mount Lemmon Survey	·	1.3 km	MPC · JPL
841204	2015 HL_{26}	—	April 25, 2010	WISE	WISE	ULA	3.9 km	MPC · JPL
841205	2015 HZ_{27}	—	March 20, 1999	Sacramento Peak	SDSS	·	600 m	MPC · JPL
841206	2015 HW_{28}	—	March 21, 2015	Haleakala	Pan-STARRS 1	·	730 m	MPC · JPL
841207	2015 HJ_{30}	—	March 18, 2015	Haleakala	Pan-STARRS 1	·	410 m	MPC · JPL
841208	2015 HZ_{40}	—	March 17, 2015	Haleakala	Pan-STARRS 1	·	1.2 km	MPC · JPL
841209	2015 HW_{41}	—	March 8, 2010	WISE	WISE	·	1.3 km	MPC · JPL
841210	2015 HD_{42}	—	May 2, 2010	WISE	WISE	·	2.5 km	MPC · JPL
841211	2015 HZ_{46}	—	March 27, 2015	Haleakala	Pan-STARRS 1	·	550 m	MPC · JPL
841212	2015 HX_{57}	—	June 23, 2010	WISE	WISE	·	1.6 km	MPC · JPL
841213	2015 HQ_{59}	—	April 18, 2015	Haleakala	Pan-STARRS 1	·	1.1 km	MPC · JPL
841214	2015 HQ_{63}	—	April 17, 2015	Mount Lemmon	Mount Lemmon Survey	·	680 m	MPC · JPL
841215	2015 HS_{68}	—	March 15, 2010	WISE	WISE	KON	2.0 km	MPC · JPL
841216	2015 HN_{75}	—	March 2, 2011	Mount Lemmon	Mount Lemmon Survey	·	800 m	MPC · JPL
841217	2015 HO_{78}	—	April 29, 2008	Kitt Peak	Spacewatch	·	490 m	MPC · JPL
841218	2015 HB_{79}	—	April 23, 2015	Haleakala	Pan-STARRS 1	·	1.9 km	MPC · JPL
841219	2015 HM_{79}	—	January 27, 2007	Mount Lemmon	Mount Lemmon Survey	·	850 m	MPC · JPL
841220	2015 HC_{80}	—	March 17, 2015	Haleakala	Pan-STARRS 1	·	1.4 km	MPC · JPL
841221	2015 HE_{83}	—	April 7, 2010	WISE	WISE	·	2.1 km	MPC · JPL
841222	2015 HD_{85}	—	March 9, 2011	Mount Lemmon	Mount Lemmon Survey	NYS	930 m	MPC · JPL
841223	2015 HB_{87}	—	April 23, 2015	Haleakala	Pan-STARRS 1	·	1.3 km	MPC · JPL
841224	2015 HB_{88}	—	August 14, 2012	Haleakala	Pan-STARRS 1	·	990 m	MPC · JPL
841225	2015 HX_{88}	—	October 23, 2003	Kitt Peak	Spacewatch	·	1.7 km	MPC · JPL
841226	2015 HH_{95}	—	January 30, 2011	Mount Lemmon	Mount Lemmon Survey	·	640 m	MPC · JPL
841227	2015 HF_{98}	—	January 29, 2011	Mount Lemmon	Mount Lemmon Survey	NYS	510 m	MPC · JPL
841228	2015 HT_{100}	—	March 17, 2015	Haleakala	Pan-STARRS 1	·	880 m	MPC · JPL
841229	2015 HE_{101}	—	March 17, 2015	Haleakala	Pan-STARRS 1	·	460 m	MPC · JPL
841230	2015 HX_{106}	—	February 16, 2015	Haleakala	Pan-STARRS 1	·	2.2 km	MPC · JPL
841231	2015 HZ_{106}	—	March 14, 2010	Mount Lemmon	Mount Lemmon Survey	ADE	1.4 km	MPC · JPL
841232	2015 HD_{110}	—	January 28, 2015	Haleakala	Pan-STARRS 1	EUN	830 m	MPC · JPL
841233	2015 HJ_{112}	—	April 23, 2015	Haleakala	Pan-STARRS 1	·	1.7 km	MPC · JPL
841234	2015 HH_{116}	—	July 4, 2005	Mount Lemmon	Mount Lemmon Survey	·	2.1 km	MPC · JPL
841235	2015 HG_{117}	—	September 22, 2008	Kitt Peak	Spacewatch	H	350 m	MPC · JPL
841236	2015 HH_{123}	—	April 23, 2015	Haleakala	Pan-STARRS 1	·	1.0 km	MPC · JPL
841237	2015 HS_{124}	—	July 29, 2010	WISE	WISE	3:2	4.9 km	MPC · JPL
841238	2015 HK_{125}	—	October 11, 2012	Haleakala	Pan-STARRS 1	·	1.1 km	MPC · JPL
841239	2015 HL_{125}	—	April 23, 2015	Haleakala	Pan-STARRS 1	·	1.1 km	MPC · JPL
841240	2015 HV_{131}	—	November 5, 2007	Mount Lemmon	Mount Lemmon Survey	DOR	1.6 km	MPC · JPL
841241	2015 HZ_{131}	—	April 23, 2015	Haleakala	Pan-STARRS 1	GEF	870 m	MPC · JPL
841242	2015 HU_{141}	—	October 20, 2012	Kitt Peak	Spacewatch	(12739)	1.3 km	MPC · JPL
841243	2015 HD_{144}	—	April 23, 2015	Haleakala	Pan-STARRS 1	·	560 m	MPC · JPL
841244	2015 HN_{146}	—	April 16, 2010	WISE	WISE	LIX	3.3 km	MPC · JPL
841245	2015 HX_{148}	—	April 23, 2015	Haleakala	Pan-STARRS 1	·	1.8 km	MPC · JPL
841246	2015 HN_{149}	—	April 23, 2015	Haleakala	Pan-STARRS 1	·	920 m	MPC · JPL
841247	2015 HU_{151}	—	October 4, 1991	Tautenburg	F. Börngen, L. D. Schmadel	·	1.5 km	MPC · JPL
841248	2015 HO_{153}	—	June 15, 2010	WISE	WISE	·	2.4 km	MPC · JPL
841249	2015 HT_{153}	—	May 18, 2010	WISE	WISE	·	2.0 km	MPC · JPL
841250	2015 HP_{154}	—	January 28, 2007	Mount Lemmon	Mount Lemmon Survey	MAS	590 m	MPC · JPL
841251	2015 HR_{155}	—	November 11, 2009	Kitt Peak	Spacewatch	·	620 m	MPC · JPL
841252	2015 HD_{156}	—	March 24, 2009	Mount Lemmon	Mount Lemmon Survey	EUP	4.0 km	MPC · JPL
841253	2015 HN_{157}	—	February 7, 2011	Mount Lemmon	Mount Lemmon Survey	·	660 m	MPC · JPL
841254	2015 HR_{160}	—	February 25, 2011	Kitt Peak	Spacewatch	·	890 m	MPC · JPL
841255	2015 HZ_{160}	—	March 5, 2002	Sacramento Peak	SDSS	·	1.2 km	MPC · JPL
841256	2015 HN_{161}	—	April 14, 2015	Mount Lemmon	Mount Lemmon Survey	JUN	610 m	MPC · JPL
841257	2015 HO_{161}	—	August 24, 2012	Kitt Peak	Spacewatch	·	700 m	MPC · JPL
841258	2015 HG_{162}	—	April 14, 2015	Mount Lemmon	Mount Lemmon Survey	·	680 m	MPC · JPL
841259	2015 HP_{162}	—	March 19, 2015	Haleakala	Pan-STARRS 1	·	2.3 km	MPC · JPL
841260	2015 HK_{166}	—	April 18, 2015	Kitt Peak	Spacewatch	(32418)	1.5 km	MPC · JPL
841261	2015 HH_{168}	—	November 3, 2012	Mount Lemmon	Mount Lemmon Survey	·	2.6 km	MPC · JPL
841262	2015 HZ_{169}	—	March 2, 2009	Mount Lemmon	Mount Lemmon Survey	THB	3.1 km	MPC · JPL
841263	2015 HK_{171}	—	July 2, 2010	WISE	WISE	·	2.4 km	MPC · JPL
841264	2015 HT_{175}	—	March 22, 2015	Mount Lemmon	Mount Lemmon Survey	PHO	880 m	MPC · JPL
841265	2015 HC_{176}	—	May 26, 2010	WISE	WISE	T_{j} (2.98)	3.1 km	MPC · JPL
841266	2015 HU_{176}	—	March 3, 2009	Catalina	CSS	T_{j} (2.96)	4.1 km	MPC · JPL
841267	2015 HF_{183}	—	February 17, 2010	Mount Lemmon	Mount Lemmon Survey	·	1.4 km	MPC · JPL
841268	2015 HG_{185}	—	April 25, 2015	Haleakala	Pan-STARRS 1	·	1.5 km	MPC · JPL
841269	2015 HQ_{186}	—	April 23, 2015	Haleakala	Pan-STARRS 1	·	1.9 km	MPC · JPL
841270	2015 HC_{189}	—	April 16, 2010	WISE	WISE	·	2.0 km	MPC · JPL
841271	2015 HE_{193}	—	April 25, 2015	Haleakala	Pan-STARRS 1	HYG	2.3 km	MPC · JPL
841272	2015 HM_{201}	—	April 24, 2015	Haleakala	Pan-STARRS 1	·	3.1 km	MPC · JPL
841273	2015 HK_{206}	—	June 28, 2010	WISE	WISE	·	1.5 km	MPC · JPL
841274	2015 HZ_{209}	—	April 25, 2015	Haleakala	Pan-STARRS 1	AEO	890 m	MPC · JPL
841275	2015 HN_{211}	—	April 23, 2015	Haleakala	Pan-STARRS 1	·	470 m	MPC · JPL
841276	2015 HH_{213}	—	April 25, 2015	Haleakala	Pan-STARRS 1	·	1.2 km	MPC · JPL
841277	2015 HM_{222}	—	April 25, 2015	Haleakala	Pan-STARRS 1	·	1.3 km	MPC · JPL
841278	2015 HL_{223}	—	April 25, 2015	Haleakala	Pan-STARRS 1	·	1.4 km	MPC · JPL
841279	2015 HV_{224}	—	April 23, 2015	Haleakala	Pan-STARRS 1	·	1.2 km	MPC · JPL
841280	2015 HY_{225}	—	April 25, 2015	Haleakala	Pan-STARRS 1	·	800 m	MPC · JPL
841281	2015 HR_{227}	—	April 25, 2015	Haleakala	Pan-STARRS 1	NYS	760 m	MPC · JPL
841282	2015 HW_{227}	—	April 25, 2015	Haleakala	Pan-STARRS 1	·	390 m	MPC · JPL
841283	2015 HJ_{228}	—	October 5, 2005	Mount Lemmon	Mount Lemmon Survey	·	810 m	MPC · JPL
841284	2015 HT_{232}	—	April 18, 2015	Haleakala	Pan-STARRS 1	V	470 m	MPC · JPL
841285	2015 HK_{233}	—	October 23, 2012	Kitt Peak	Spacewatch	·	1.5 km	MPC · JPL
841286	2015 HR_{234}	—	August 28, 2016	Mount Lemmon	Mount Lemmon Survey	·	1.4 km	MPC · JPL
841287	2015 HX_{251}	—	November 2, 2008	Kitt Peak	Spacewatch	·	1.0 km	MPC · JPL
841288	2015 HL_{252}	—	April 18, 2015	Cerro Tololo	DECam	L4	6.2 km	MPC · JPL
841289	2015 HV_{281}	—	April 18, 2015	Cerro Tololo	DECam	·	520 m	MPC · JPL
841290	2015 HQ_{291}	—	April 19, 2015	Cerro Tololo	DECam	·	1.7 km	MPC · JPL
841291	2015 HJ_{306}	—	April 18, 2015	Cerro Tololo	DECam	·	1.3 km	MPC · JPL
841292	2015 HF_{342}	—	December 3, 2010	Kitt Peak	Spacewatch	·	490 m	MPC · JPL
841293	2015 HG_{344}	—	April 19, 2015	Cerro Tololo	DECam	·	2.1 km	MPC · JPL
841294	2015 HC_{345}	—	April 24, 2015	Haleakala	Pan-STARRS 1	V	500 m	MPC · JPL
841295	2015 HH_{471}	—	April 18, 2015	Cerro Tololo	DECam	L4	6.0 km	MPC · JPL
841296	2015 JN_{2}	—	September 10, 2010	Kitt Peak	Spacewatch	H	450 m	MPC · JPL
841297	2015 JM_{3}	—	March 28, 2010	WISE	WISE	·	2.0 km	MPC · JPL
841298	2015 JY_{6}	—	August 12, 2012	Siding Spring	SSS	·	580 m	MPC · JPL
841299	2015 JB_{7}	—	May 15, 2015	Haleakala	Pan-STARRS 1	·	2.2 km	MPC · JPL
841300	2015 JD_{7}	—	March 22, 2015	Haleakala	Pan-STARRS 1	·	490 m	MPC · JPL

== 841301–841400 ==
back to top

Designation			Discovery			Properties		Ref
Permanent	Provisional	Named after	Date	Site	Discoverer(s)	Category	Diam.	Ref
841301	2015 JF_{7}	—	May 15, 2015	Haleakala	Pan-STARRS 1	·	670 m	MPC · JPL
841302	2015 JX_{7}	—	November 22, 2009	Mount Lemmon	Mount Lemmon Survey	·	1.1 km	MPC · JPL
841303	2015 JD_{8}	—	April 14, 2010	WISE	WISE	·	3.0 km	MPC · JPL
841304	2015 JV_{9}	—	June 10, 2010	WISE	WISE	·	2.3 km	MPC · JPL
841305	2015 JG_{11}	—	February 15, 2010	Kitt Peak	Spacewatch	DOR	1.6 km	MPC · JPL
841306	2015 JS_{12}	—	May 15, 2015	Haleakala	Pan-STARRS 1	·	1.5 km	MPC · JPL
841307	2015 JS_{16}	—	January 30, 2010	WISE	WISE	·	1.9 km	MPC · JPL
841308	2015 JF_{18}	—	May 11, 2015	Mount Lemmon	Mount Lemmon Survey	·	800 m	MPC · JPL
841309	2015 JW_{19}	—	May 11, 2015	Mount Lemmon	Mount Lemmon Survey	·	1 km	MPC · JPL
841310	2015 JH_{22}	—	May 10, 2015	Mount Lemmon	Mount Lemmon Survey	·	880 m	MPC · JPL
841311	2015 JL_{22}	—	May 11, 2015	Mount Lemmon	Mount Lemmon Survey	·	550 m	MPC · JPL
841312	2015 JW_{23}	—	May 11, 2015	Mount Lemmon	Mount Lemmon Survey	·	2.1 km	MPC · JPL
841313	2015 JC_{25}	—	May 14, 2015	Haleakala	Pan-STARRS 1	TIR	1.9 km	MPC · JPL
841314	2015 JF_{25}	—	May 7, 2015	Haleakala	Pan-STARRS 1	·	1.7 km	MPC · JPL
841315	2015 JB_{26}	—	May 11, 2015	Mount Lemmon	Mount Lemmon Survey	AST	1.3 km	MPC · JPL
841316	2015 JL_{26}	—	May 14, 2015	Haleakala	Pan-STARRS 1	H	290 m	MPC · JPL
841317	2015 JO_{26}	—	May 12, 2015	Mount Lemmon	Mount Lemmon Survey	·	410 m	MPC · JPL
841318	2015 KF_{1}	—	July 20, 2010	WISE	WISE	·	2.6 km	MPC · JPL
841319	2015 KG_{1}	—	November 26, 2013	Mount Lemmon	Mount Lemmon Survey	·	1.9 km	MPC · JPL
841320	2015 KR_{1}	—	October 23, 2003	Kitt Peak	Spacewatch	·	1.7 km	MPC · JPL
841321	2015 KY_{3}	—	March 31, 2015	Haleakala	Pan-STARRS 1	PHO	610 m	MPC · JPL
841322	2015 KC_{4}	—	February 20, 2015	Haleakala	Pan-STARRS 1	·	930 m	MPC · JPL
841323	2015 KB_{5}	—	February 14, 2015	Mount Lemmon	Mount Lemmon Survey	ADE	1.4 km	MPC · JPL
841324	2015 KT_{6}	—	January 28, 2014	Mount Lemmon	Mount Lemmon Survey	·	1.4 km	MPC · JPL
841325	2015 KF_{8}	—	March 30, 2015	Haleakala	Pan-STARRS 1	critical	1.4 km	MPC · JPL
841326	2015 KA_{9}	—	April 20, 2010	WISE	WISE	·	2.5 km	MPC · JPL
841327	2015 KY_{9}	—	May 18, 2015	Haleakala	Pan-STARRS 1	TIN	810 m	MPC · JPL
841328	2015 KN_{10}	—	March 28, 2015	Haleakala	Pan-STARRS 1	·	1.3 km	MPC · JPL
841329	2015 KT_{15}	—	September 4, 2011	Haleakala	Pan-STARRS 1	BRA	1.0 km	MPC · JPL
841330	2015 KW_{15}	—	May 15, 2005	Palomar	NEAT	T_{j} (2.82)	2.8 km	MPC · JPL
841331	2015 KY_{19}	—	March 31, 2011	Haleakala	Pan-STARRS 1	NYS	800 m	MPC · JPL
841332	2015 KX_{21}	—	May 10, 2010	WISE	WISE	·	1.5 km	MPC · JPL
841333	2015 KA_{24}	—	April 22, 2010	WISE	WISE	THM	2.4 km	MPC · JPL
841334	2015 KO_{24}	—	October 27, 2009	Kitt Peak	Spacewatch	·	450 m	MPC · JPL
841335	2015 KQ_{25}	—	September 17, 2009	Kitt Peak	Spacewatch	·	590 m	MPC · JPL
841336	2015 KD_{26}	—	May 11, 2015	Mount Lemmon	Mount Lemmon Survey	·	1.3 km	MPC · JPL
841337	2015 KP_{32}	—	August 16, 2012	Haleakala	Pan-STARRS 1	·	420 m	MPC · JPL
841338	2015 KK_{35}	—	April 19, 2010	WISE	WISE	·	2.2 km	MPC · JPL
841339	2015 KK_{36}	—	May 19, 2015	Haleakala	Pan-STARRS 1	(5)	920 m	MPC · JPL
841340	2015 KQ_{40}	—	March 6, 2011	Kitt Peak	Spacewatch	MAS	580 m	MPC · JPL
841341	2015 KM_{46}	—	September 18, 2012	Mount Lemmon	Mount Lemmon Survey	NYS	960 m	MPC · JPL
841342	2015 KA_{50}	—	May 20, 2015	Haleakala	Pan-STARRS 1	·	2.1 km	MPC · JPL
841343	2015 KG_{54}	—	May 20, 2015	Haleakala	Pan-STARRS 1	·	470 m	MPC · JPL
841344	2015 KO_{55}	—	May 20, 2015	Haleakala	Pan-STARRS 1	·	570 m	MPC · JPL
841345	2015 KG_{57}	—	October 5, 2013	Haleakala	Pan-STARRS 1	H	380 m	MPC · JPL
841346	2015 KZ_{59}	—	April 22, 2009	Mount Lemmon	Mount Lemmon Survey	(69559)	2.9 km	MPC · JPL
841347	2015 KM_{66}	—	April 17, 2015	Kitt Peak	Spacewatch	·	740 m	MPC · JPL
841348	2015 KW_{66}	—	October 30, 2002	Sacramento Peak	SDSS	·	1.6 km	MPC · JPL
841349	2015 KC_{72}	—	September 25, 2006	Kitt Peak	Spacewatch	·	1.8 km	MPC · JPL
841350	2015 KB_{75}	—	April 17, 2010	WISE	WISE	·	2.6 km	MPC · JPL
841351	2015 KB_{76}	—	May 21, 2015	Haleakala	Pan-STARRS 1	·	1.4 km	MPC · JPL
841352	2015 KP_{77}	—	April 25, 2015	Haleakala	Pan-STARRS 1	·	2.3 km	MPC · JPL
841353	2015 KY_{77}	—	April 23, 2015	Haleakala	Pan-STARRS 1	·	1.5 km	MPC · JPL
841354	2015 KJ_{80}	—	May 21, 2015	Haleakala	Pan-STARRS 1	·	1.2 km	MPC · JPL
841355	2015 KW_{81}	—	March 30, 2015	Haleakala	Pan-STARRS 1	·	1.4 km	MPC · JPL
841356	2015 KC_{82}	—	February 11, 2010	WISE	WISE	·	1.6 km	MPC · JPL
841357	2015 KJ_{83}	—	May 21, 2015	Haleakala	Pan-STARRS 1	·	1.5 km	MPC · JPL
841358	2015 KE_{87}	—	May 21, 2015	Haleakala	Pan-STARRS 1	EUN	890 m	MPC · JPL
841359	2015 KV_{91}	—	May 21, 2015	Haleakala	Pan-STARRS 1	AGN	870 m	MPC · JPL
841360	2015 KO_{92}	—	March 21, 1999	Sacramento Peak	SDSS	·	1.6 km	MPC · JPL
841361	2015 KF_{96}	—	April 23, 2015	Haleakala	Pan-STARRS 1	·	1.2 km	MPC · JPL
841362	2015 KK_{97}	—	May 21, 2015	Haleakala	Pan-STARRS 1	·	1.3 km	MPC · JPL
841363	2015 KJ_{99}	—	August 1, 2011	Haleakala	Pan-STARRS 1	DOR	1.7 km	MPC · JPL
841364	2015 KZ_{99}	—	March 21, 2015	Haleakala	Pan-STARRS 1	·	1.7 km	MPC · JPL
841365	2015 KS_{101}	—	May 21, 2015	Haleakala	Pan-STARRS 1	AGN	780 m	MPC · JPL
841366	2015 KN_{106}	—	May 21, 2015	Haleakala	Pan-STARRS 1	3:2	4.1 km	MPC · JPL
841367	2015 KH_{107}	—	May 21, 2015	Haleakala	Pan-STARRS 1	·	1.2 km	MPC · JPL
841368	2015 KA_{109}	—	November 1, 2007	Kitt Peak	Spacewatch	·	1.3 km	MPC · JPL
841369	2015 KW_{110}	—	August 26, 2012	Haleakala	Pan-STARRS 1	V	410 m	MPC · JPL
841370	2015 KK_{111}	—	May 21, 2015	Haleakala	Pan-STARRS 1	·	580 m	MPC · JPL
841371	2015 KR_{111}	—	May 21, 2015	Haleakala	Pan-STARRS 1	·	830 m	MPC · JPL
841372	2015 KZ_{111}	—	May 7, 2010	WISE	WISE	·	2.7 km	MPC · JPL
841373	2015 KP_{116}	—	May 21, 2015	Haleakala	Pan-STARRS 1	·	760 m	MPC · JPL
841374	2015 KR_{118}	—	October 18, 2012	Haleakala	Pan-STARRS 1	·	1.5 km	MPC · JPL
841375	2015 KB_{119}	—	September 24, 2011	Haleakala	Pan-STARRS 1	·	1.8 km	MPC · JPL
841376	2015 KD_{120}	—	May 22, 2015	Haleakala	Pan-STARRS 1	HNS	1.2 km	MPC · JPL
841377	2015 KB_{121}	—	August 12, 1999	Anderson Mesa	LONEOS	·	1.2 km	MPC · JPL
841378	2015 KZ_{124}	—	September 17, 2006	Kitt Peak	Spacewatch	·	540 m	MPC · JPL
841379	2015 KU_{127}	—	August 19, 2012	ESA OGS	ESA OGS	·	470 m	MPC · JPL
841380	2015 KX_{127}	—	June 12, 2010	WISE	WISE	DOR	1.9 km	MPC · JPL
841381	2015 KB_{129}	—	May 10, 2015	Mount Lemmon	Mount Lemmon Survey	·	1.3 km	MPC · JPL
841382	2015 KL_{132}	—	May 22, 2015	Haleakala	Pan-STARRS 1	·	560 m	MPC · JPL
841383	2015 KF_{133}	—	May 13, 2015	Kitt Peak	Spacewatch	·	1.6 km	MPC · JPL
841384	2015 KG_{133}	—	May 23, 2015	Mount Lemmon	Mount Lemmon Survey	·	1.1 km	MPC · JPL
841385	2015 KG_{134}	—	May 16, 2010	WISE	WISE	TIR	3.0 km	MPC · JPL
841386	2015 KL_{135}	—	May 24, 2015	Haleakala	Pan-STARRS 1	·	630 m	MPC · JPL
841387	2015 KK_{140}	—	May 12, 2010	WISE	WISE	·	2.6 km	MPC · JPL
841388	2015 KW_{145}	—	January 3, 2014	Kitt Peak	Spacewatch	·	1.7 km	MPC · JPL
841389	2015 KR_{146}	—	April 18, 2015	Haleakala	Pan-STARRS 1	·	1.4 km	MPC · JPL
841390	2015 KT_{146}	—	May 9, 2010	WISE	WISE	·	2.9 km	MPC · JPL
841391	2015 KU_{148}	—	June 8, 2010	WISE	WISE	·	2.9 km	MPC · JPL
841392	2015 KG_{150}	—	February 25, 2011	Mount Lemmon	Mount Lemmon Survey	·	520 m	MPC · JPL
841393	2015 KJ_{150}	—	March 11, 2010	WISE	WISE	·	2.9 km	MPC · JPL
841394	2015 KU_{150}	—	May 29, 2010	WISE	WISE	·	1.7 km	MPC · JPL
841395	2015 KM_{152}	—	May 15, 2010	WISE	WISE	THB	3.1 km	MPC · JPL
841396	2015 KQ_{152}	—	May 25, 2015	Haleakala	Pan-STARRS 1	·	1.4 km	MPC · JPL
841397	2015 KL_{154}	—	May 21, 2015	Haleakala	Pan-STARRS 1	H	310 m	MPC · JPL
841398	2015 KZ_{155}	—	May 2, 2010	WISE	WISE	EUP	3.1 km	MPC · JPL
841399	2015 KM_{156}	—	May 26, 2010	WISE	WISE	T_{j} (2.94)	2.8 km	MPC · JPL
841400	2015 KN_{156}	—	May 19, 2015	Mount Lemmon	Mount Lemmon Survey	H	410 m	MPC · JPL

== 841401–841500 ==
back to top

Designation			Discovery			Properties		Ref
Permanent	Provisional	Named after	Date	Site	Discoverer(s)	Category	Diam.	Ref
841401	2015 KM_{158}	—	May 26, 2015	Haleakala	Pan-STARRS 1	H	480 m	MPC · JPL
841402	2015 KP_{158}	—	November 10, 2013	Mount Lemmon	Mount Lemmon Survey	H	360 m	MPC · JPL
841403	2015 KY_{159}	—	May 4, 2010	WISE	WISE	·	2.9 km	MPC · JPL
841404	2015 KQ_{167}	—	May 21, 2015	Haleakala	Pan-STARRS 1	·	830 m	MPC · JPL
841405	2015 KY_{171}	—	May 26, 2015	Haleakala	Pan-STARRS 1	·	1.0 km	MPC · JPL
841406	2015 KN_{181}	—	May 18, 2015	Haleakala	Pan-STARRS 2	·	980 m	MPC · JPL
841407	2015 KM_{182}	—	May 21, 2015	Haleakala	Pan-STARRS 1	(5)	840 m	MPC · JPL
841408	2015 KQ_{187}	—	May 26, 2015	Mount Lemmon	Mount Lemmon Survey	·	2.3 km	MPC · JPL
841409	2015 KM_{192}	—	October 10, 2012	Mount Lemmon	Mount Lemmon Survey	(2076)	570 m	MPC · JPL
841410	2015 KT_{192}	—	May 27, 2015	Mount Lemmon	Mount Lemmon Survey	·	430 m	MPC · JPL
841411	2015 KY_{192}	—	May 22, 2015	Haleakala	Pan-STARRS 1	·	1.0 km	MPC · JPL
841412	2015 KV_{197}	—	May 29, 2015	Haleakala	Pan-STARRS 1	(18466)	1.8 km	MPC · JPL
841413	2015 KN_{198}	—	May 21, 2015	Haleakala	Pan-STARRS 1	·	750 m	MPC · JPL
841414	2015 KA_{200}	—	May 25, 2015	Haleakala	Pan-STARRS 1	AGN	790 m	MPC · JPL
841415	2015 KK_{201}	—	May 21, 2015	Haleakala	Pan-STARRS 1	NYS	540 m	MPC · JPL
841416	2015 KS_{201}	—	May 21, 2015	Haleakala	Pan-STARRS 1	·	1.9 km	MPC · JPL
841417	2015 KC_{203}	—	May 24, 2015	Haleakala	Pan-STARRS 1	KOR	1.0 km	MPC · JPL
841418	2015 KK_{206}	—	May 21, 2015	Haleakala	Pan-STARRS 1	·	1.6 km	MPC · JPL
841419	2015 KQ_{206}	—	May 22, 2015	Haleakala	Pan-STARRS 1	·	1.4 km	MPC · JPL
841420	2015 KH_{207}	—	May 19, 2015	Haleakala	Pan-STARRS 1	·	1.7 km	MPC · JPL
841421	2015 KO_{209}	—	May 26, 2015	Haleakala	Pan-STARRS 1	·	1.3 km	MPC · JPL
841422	2015 KH_{210}	—	May 12, 2015	Mount Lemmon	Mount Lemmon Survey	V	520 m	MPC · JPL
841423	2015 KL_{211}	—	May 21, 2015	Cerro Tololo	DECam	·	370 m	MPC · JPL
841424	2015 KS_{212}	—	May 21, 2015	Cerro Tololo	DECam	L4	4.8 km	MPC · JPL
841425	2015 KZ_{217}	—	September 15, 2009	Mount Lemmon	Mount Lemmon Survey	·	450 m	MPC · JPL
841426	2015 KJ_{218}	—	May 21, 2015	Haleakala	Pan-STARRS 1	·	1.3 km	MPC · JPL
841427	2015 KV_{227}	—	May 20, 2015	Cerro Tololo	DECam	·	1.2 km	MPC · JPL
841428	2015 KF_{242}	—	May 24, 2015	Haleakala	Pan-STARRS 1	AST	1.1 km	MPC · JPL
841429	2015 KH_{313}	—	May 20, 2015	Cerro Tololo	DECam	·	1.3 km	MPC · JPL
841430	2015 KZ_{326}	—	May 20, 2015	Cerro Tololo	DECam	·	1.4 km	MPC · JPL
841431	2015 KH_{372}	—	May 20, 2015	Cerro Tololo	DECam	·	600 m	MPC · JPL
841432	2015 KS_{374}	—	May 21, 2015	Haleakala	Pan-STARRS 1	·	1.4 km	MPC · JPL
841433	2015 LE_{1}	—	June 5, 2015	Haleakala	Pan-STARRS 1	·	3.5 km	MPC · JPL
841434	2015 LN_{1}	—	August 4, 2010	WISE	WISE	·	2.3 km	MPC · JPL
841435	2015 LX_{1}	—	April 16, 2010	WISE	WISE	EUP	2.6 km	MPC · JPL
841436	2015 LF_{2}	—	March 19, 2015	Haleakala	Pan-STARRS 1	H	340 m	MPC · JPL
841437	2015 LE_{6}	—	May 26, 2010	WISE	WISE	·	1.6 km	MPC · JPL
841438	2015 LH_{7}	—	May 19, 2010	WISE	WISE	·	2.7 km	MPC · JPL
841439	2015 LJ_{7}	—	May 15, 2010	WISE	WISE	LIX	2.9 km	MPC · JPL
841440	2015 LJ_{8}	—	May 26, 2010	WISE	WISE	·	2.6 km	MPC · JPL
841441	2015 LJ_{12}	—	August 8, 1999	Kitt Peak	Spacewatch	·	1.0 km	MPC · JPL
841442	2015 LR_{12}	—	March 30, 2015	Haleakala	Pan-STARRS 1	·	810 m	MPC · JPL
841443	2015 LY_{12}	—	May 11, 2010	WISE	WISE	·	1.1 km	MPC · JPL
841444	2015 LG_{15}	—	June 26, 2011	Calvin-Rehoboth	L. A. Molnar	·	1.0 km	MPC · JPL
841445	2015 LW_{15}	—	June 11, 2015	Haleakala	Pan-STARRS 1	DOR	1.6 km	MPC · JPL
841446	2015 LE_{16}	—	June 11, 2015	Haleakala	Pan-STARRS 1	·	1.1 km	MPC · JPL
841447	2015 LS_{18}	—	March 2, 2011	Mount Lemmon	Mount Lemmon Survey	NYS	920 m	MPC · JPL
841448	2015 LJ_{20}	—	June 23, 2010	WISE	WISE	·	2.0 km	MPC · JPL
841449	2015 LP_{22}	—	May 1, 2011	Mount Lemmon	Mount Lemmon Survey	·	960 m	MPC · JPL
841450	2015 LE_{25}	—	May 3, 2008	Mount Lemmon	Mount Lemmon Survey	·	420 m	MPC · JPL
841451	2015 LV_{29}	—	June 9, 2010	WISE	WISE	·	1.3 km	MPC · JPL
841452	2015 LC_{30}	—	May 24, 2010	WISE	WISE	·	2.1 km	MPC · JPL
841453	2015 LU_{32}	—	May 14, 2009	Mount Lemmon	Mount Lemmon Survey	T_{j} (2.99)	3.9 km	MPC · JPL
841454	2015 LM_{33}	—	June 13, 2015	Haleakala	Pan-STARRS 1	·	1.5 km	MPC · JPL
841455	2015 LS_{33}	—	June 13, 2015	Haleakala	Pan-STARRS 1	·	1.6 km	MPC · JPL
841456	2015 LV_{34}	—	June 6, 2010	WISE	WISE	·	3.3 km	MPC · JPL
841457	2015 LY_{34}	—	June 13, 2015	Haleakala	Pan-STARRS 1	H	340 m	MPC · JPL
841458	2015 LY_{35}	—	December 12, 2012	Mount Lemmon	Mount Lemmon Survey	·	490 m	MPC · JPL
841459	2015 LG_{36}	—	April 27, 2010	WISE	WISE	·	2.1 km	MPC · JPL
841460	2015 LH_{36}	—	May 11, 2010	WISE	WISE	·	2.8 km	MPC · JPL
841461	2015 LR_{38}	—	May 22, 2015	Haleakala	Pan-STARRS 1	URS	2.5 km	MPC · JPL
841462	2015 LV_{38}	—	July 11, 1994	La Silla	H. Debehogne, E. W. Elst	·	750 m	MPC · JPL
841463	2015 LK_{39}	—	July 26, 2010	WISE	WISE	·	2.2 km	MPC · JPL
841464	2015 LK_{41}	—	June 12, 2010	WISE	WISE	·	2.6 km	MPC · JPL
841465	2015 LA_{42}	—	November 16, 2003	Sacramento Peak	SDSS	·	1.1 km	MPC · JPL
841466	2015 LS_{42}	—	June 15, 2015	Haleakala	Pan-STARRS 1	EOS	1.4 km	MPC · JPL
841467	2015 LZ_{44}	—	June 13, 2015	Haleakala	Pan-STARRS 1	·	2.2 km	MPC · JPL
841468	2015 LT_{45}	—	October 8, 2007	Mount Lemmon	Mount Lemmon Survey	·	1.3 km	MPC · JPL
841469	2015 LD_{47}	—	June 7, 2015	Mount Lemmon	Mount Lemmon Survey	·	830 m	MPC · JPL
841470	2015 LL_{47}	—	May 27, 2010	WISE	WISE	·	2.1 km	MPC · JPL
841471	2015 LS_{48}	—	June 12, 2015	Mount Lemmon	Mount Lemmon Survey	·	1.3 km	MPC · JPL
841472	2015 LQ_{49}	—	May 24, 2010	WISE	WISE	·	3.0 km	MPC · JPL
841473	2015 LU_{52}	—	June 2, 2015	Cerro Tololo-DECam	DECam	KOR	1.1 km	MPC · JPL
841474	2015 LP_{53}	—	June 13, 2015	Haleakala	Pan-STARRS 1	·	1.5 km	MPC · JPL
841475	2015 LQ_{57}	—	February 9, 2014	Kitt Peak	Spacewatch	·	1.4 km	MPC · JPL
841476	2015 LM_{59}	—	June 11, 2015	Haleakala	Pan-STARRS 1	·	1.8 km	MPC · JPL
841477	2015 LP_{65}	—	June 12, 2015	Haleakala	Pan-STARRS 1	·	820 m	MPC · JPL
841478	2015 MK_{2}	—	April 29, 2010	WISE	WISE	·	3.1 km	MPC · JPL
841479	2015 MS_{2}	—	June 16, 2015	Haleakala	Pan-STARRS 1	·	700 m	MPC · JPL
841480	2015 MJ_{5}	—	June 12, 2010	WISE	WISE	T_{j} (2.98)	3.2 km	MPC · JPL
841481	2015 MY_{6}	—	June 13, 2015	Mount Lemmon	Mount Lemmon Survey	·	940 m	MPC · JPL
841482	2015 ME_{7}	—	June 16, 2015	Haleakala	Pan-STARRS 1	·	1.2 km	MPC · JPL
841483	2015 MO_{8}	—	June 1, 2010	WISE	WISE	·	2.3 km	MPC · JPL
841484	2015 MR_{9}	—	July 6, 2010	WISE	WISE	·	3.0 km	MPC · JPL
841485	2015 MF_{12}	—	May 13, 2010	Mount Lemmon	Mount Lemmon Survey	·	1.3 km	MPC · JPL
841486	2015 MG_{17}	—	April 23, 2015	Haleakala	Pan-STARRS 1	·	440 m	MPC · JPL
841487	2015 MC_{20}	—	June 18, 2015	Haleakala	Pan-STARRS 1	·	930 m	MPC · JPL
841488	2015 MG_{22}	—	March 30, 2011	Haleakala	Pan-STARRS 1	·	870 m	MPC · JPL
841489	2015 MX_{23}	—	October 9, 2007	Mount Lemmon	Mount Lemmon Survey	AGN	820 m	MPC · JPL
841490	2015 MX_{25}	—	November 20, 2008	Kitt Peak	Spacewatch	H	400 m	MPC · JPL
841491	2015 MX_{27}	—	August 13, 2012	Haleakala	Pan-STARRS 1	·	1.1 km	MPC · JPL
841492	2015 MV_{28}	—	September 24, 2012	Mount Lemmon	Mount Lemmon Survey	·	740 m	MPC · JPL
841493	2015 MU_{30}	—	June 18, 2015	Haleakala	Pan-STARRS 1	·	510 m	MPC · JPL
841494	2015 MG_{31}	—	October 10, 1999	Kitt Peak	Spacewatch	·	2.2 km	MPC · JPL
841495	2015 MR_{31}	—	October 11, 2012	Haleakala	Pan-STARRS 1	PHO	760 m	MPC · JPL
841496	2015 MQ_{32}	—	April 25, 2015	Haleakala	Pan-STARRS 1	·	1.3 km	MPC · JPL
841497	2015 MV_{34}	—	April 23, 2015	Haleakala	Pan-STARRS 1	EUN	810 m	MPC · JPL
841498	2015 ML_{36}	—	June 18, 2015	Haleakala	Pan-STARRS 1	EOS	1.3 km	MPC · JPL
841499	2015 MM_{38}	—	March 30, 2015	Haleakala	Pan-STARRS 1	·	770 m	MPC · JPL
841500	2015 MB_{42}	—	September 26, 2000	Sacramento Peak	SDSS	·	2.3 km	MPC · JPL

== 841501–841600 ==
back to top

Designation			Discovery			Properties		Ref
Permanent	Provisional	Named after	Date	Site	Discoverer(s)	Category	Diam.	Ref
841501	2015 MW_{42}	—	June 18, 2015	Haleakala	Pan-STARRS 1	EOS	1.2 km	MPC · JPL
841502	2015 MM_{43}	—	March 28, 2015	Haleakala	Pan-STARRS 1	·	1.6 km	MPC · JPL
841503	2015 MR_{47}	—	October 7, 2008	Mount Lemmon	Mount Lemmon Survey	V	550 m	MPC · JPL
841504	2015 MY_{49}	—	April 15, 2010	WISE	WISE	·	1.6 km	MPC · JPL
841505	2015 MN_{52}	—	April 11, 2010	WISE	WISE	·	3.6 km	MPC · JPL
841506	2015 ME_{58}	—	June 15, 2015	Haleakala	Pan-STARRS 1	·	1.3 km	MPC · JPL
841507	2015 MW_{58}	—	September 19, 1998	Sacramento Peak	SDSS	·	590 m	MPC · JPL
841508	2015 MU_{59}	—	June 21, 2015	Mount Lemmon	Mount Lemmon Survey	AMO	360 m	MPC · JPL
841509	2015 MM_{61}	—	June 8, 2010	WISE	WISE	·	950 m	MPC · JPL
841510	2015 MN_{62}	—	June 20, 2015	Haleakala	Pan-STARRS 1	ADE	1.3 km	MPC · JPL
841511	2015 MF_{64}	—	October 1, 2000	Sacramento Peak	SDSS	·	1.4 km	MPC · JPL
841512	2015 ML_{65}	—	July 29, 2011	Siding Spring	SSS	·	780 m	MPC · JPL
841513	2015 MM_{65}	—	June 15, 2015	Mount Lemmon	Mount Lemmon Survey	·	1.2 km	MPC · JPL
841514	2015 MP_{65}	—	July 27, 2010	WISE	WISE	(69559)	2.8 km	MPC · JPL
841515	2015 MQ_{65}	—	June 20, 2015	Haleakala	Pan-STARRS 1	NYS	740 m	MPC · JPL
841516	2015 MS_{66}	—	May 22, 2010	WISE	WISE	·	3.3 km	MPC · JPL
841517	2015 MV_{67}	—	October 10, 2002	Sacramento Peak	SDSS	·	2.1 km	MPC · JPL
841518	2015 ME_{68}	—	October 6, 2008	Mount Lemmon	Mount Lemmon Survey	·	920 m	MPC · JPL
841519	2015 MX_{68}	—	June 11, 2010	WISE	WISE	·	2.8 km	MPC · JPL
841520	2015 MY_{68}	—	June 20, 2015	Haleakala	Pan-STARRS 1	·	890 m	MPC · JPL
841521	2015 MA_{70}	—	June 22, 2015	Haleakala	Pan-STARRS 1	·	1.5 km	MPC · JPL
841522	2015 MF_{72}	—	June 22, 2015	Haleakala	Pan-STARRS 1	·	960 m	MPC · JPL
841523	2015 MX_{72}	—	June 22, 2015	Haleakala	Pan-STARRS 1	·	1.4 km	MPC · JPL
841524	2015 MR_{73}	—	June 18, 2015	Haleakala	Pan-STARRS 1	·	2.3 km	MPC · JPL
841525	2015 MS_{73}	—	June 22, 2015	Haleakala	Pan-STARRS 1	·	1.3 km	MPC · JPL
841526	2015 MP_{76}	—	April 11, 2010	WISE	WISE	·	1.6 km	MPC · JPL
841527	2015 MT_{77}	—	December 7, 2005	Kitt Peak	Spacewatch	PHO	540 m	MPC · JPL
841528	2015 MA_{79}	—	June 16, 2015	Haleakala	Pan-STARRS 1	·	2.3 km	MPC · JPL
841529 Jonahwoodhams	2015 MJ_{81}	Jonahwoodhams	September 26, 2011	Mayhill	Falla, N.	·	960 m	MPC · JPL
841530	2015 MS_{81}	—	June 14, 2015	Mount Lemmon	Mount Lemmon Survey	MAR	680 m	MPC · JPL
841531	2015 MX_{81}	—	June 18, 2015	Haleakala	Pan-STARRS 1	·	1.5 km	MPC · JPL
841532	2015 MZ_{82}	—	March 5, 2002	Sacramento Peak	SDSS	·	2.2 km	MPC · JPL
841533	2015 MY_{84}	—	July 6, 2010	WISE	WISE	·	2.0 km	MPC · JPL
841534	2015 MV_{86}	—	April 11, 2010	Mount Lemmon	Mount Lemmon Survey	·	1.2 km	MPC · JPL
841535	2015 MG_{87}	—	October 23, 2012	Mount Lemmon	Mount Lemmon Survey	·	540 m	MPC · JPL
841536	2015 MB_{89}	—	June 18, 2015	Haleakala	Pan-STARRS 1	·	1.3 km	MPC · JPL
841537	2015 MY_{89}	—	July 16, 2010	WISE	WISE	EUP	3.1 km	MPC · JPL
841538	2015 MB_{91}	—	December 26, 2006	Kitt Peak	Spacewatch	·	2.8 km	MPC · JPL
841539	2015 MM_{93}	—	October 18, 2012	Haleakala	Pan-STARRS 1	·	850 m	MPC · JPL
841540	2015 MC_{101}	—	April 21, 2009	Mount Lemmon	Mount Lemmon Survey	·	2.5 km	MPC · JPL
841541	2015 MH_{102}	—	April 28, 2003	Kitt Peak	Spacewatch	THB	2.2 km	MPC · JPL
841542	2015 ML_{102}	—	June 24, 2015	Haleakala	Pan-STARRS 1	EUN	970 m	MPC · JPL
841543	2015 MA_{103}	—	June 15, 2015	Haleakala	Pan-STARRS 1	·	1.0 km	MPC · JPL
841544	2015 MK_{107}	—	January 29, 2014	Mount Lemmon	Mount Lemmon Survey	H	410 m	MPC · JPL
841545	2015 MH_{110}	—	July 18, 2010	WISE	WISE	·	2.9 km	MPC · JPL
841546	2015 MG_{112}	—	June 19, 2010	WISE	WISE	·	1.6 km	MPC · JPL
841547	2015 MK_{112}	—	June 22, 2015	Siding Spring	Dawson, B. C.	MAS	490 m	MPC · JPL
841548	2015 MQ_{113}	—	June 27, 2015	Haleakala	Pan-STARRS 1	H	320 m	MPC · JPL
841549	2015 MK_{118}	—	September 26, 2000	Sacramento Peak	SDSS	EOS	2.1 km	MPC · JPL
841550	2015 MP_{119}	—	August 6, 2010	WISE	WISE	·	2.3 km	MPC · JPL
841551	2015 MX_{120}	—	June 27, 2015	Haleakala	Pan-STARRS 1	·	520 m	MPC · JPL
841552	2015 MP_{122}	—	August 1, 2010	WISE	WISE	·	3.4 km	MPC · JPL
841553	2015 MH_{123}	—	May 8, 2010	WISE	WISE	·	2.2 km	MPC · JPL
841554	2015 MZ_{123}	—	July 19, 2010	WISE	WISE	T_{j} (2.98)	3.3 km	MPC · JPL
841555	2015 MX_{125}	—	July 30, 2010	WISE	WISE	·	2.5 km	MPC · JPL
841556	2015 MF_{127}	—	December 23, 2012	Haleakala	Pan-STARRS 1	EUN	1.0 km	MPC · JPL
841557	2015 MP_{129}	—	May 7, 2010	Kitt Peak	Spacewatch	·	1.4 km	MPC · JPL
841558	2015 MM_{130}	—	June 22, 2006	Kitt Peak	Spacewatch	·	1.9 km	MPC · JPL
841559	2015 ME_{133}	—	June 24, 2015	Haleakala	Pan-STARRS 1	BRA	1.1 km	MPC · JPL
841560	2015 MN_{133}	—	September 27, 2003	Sacramento Peak	SDSS	EUN	790 m	MPC · JPL
841561	2015 MU_{133}	—	June 19, 2015	Haleakala	Pan-STARRS 1	·	2.4 km	MPC · JPL
841562	2015 MT_{134}	—	July 15, 2010	WISE	WISE	·	1.7 km	MPC · JPL
841563	2015 MR_{141}	—	January 5, 2013	Mount Lemmon	Mount Lemmon Survey	·	1.7 km	MPC · JPL
841564	2015 MU_{141}	—	June 19, 2015	Haleakala	Pan-STARRS 1	EOS	1.4 km	MPC · JPL
841565	2015 ML_{143}	—	June 22, 2015	Haleakala	Pan-STARRS 1	·	1.2 km	MPC · JPL
841566	2015 ME_{145}	—	April 9, 2010	Kitt Peak	Spacewatch	·	1.1 km	MPC · JPL
841567	2015 MH_{147}	—	June 27, 2015	Haleakala	Pan-STARRS 1	EOS	1.3 km	MPC · JPL
841568	2015 MH_{148}	—	September 11, 2010	Mount Lemmon	Mount Lemmon Survey	·	1.4 km	MPC · JPL
841569	2015 MA_{149}	—	June 27, 2015	Haleakala	Pan-STARRS 1	·	1.2 km	MPC · JPL
841570	2015 MG_{152}	—	June 17, 2015	Haleakala	Pan-STARRS 1	·	1.3 km	MPC · JPL
841571	2015 MZ_{153}	—	November 5, 2002	Kitt Peak	Spacewatch	·	1.4 km	MPC · JPL
841572	2015 MB_{156}	—	June 18, 2015	Haleakala	Pan-STARRS 1	·	870 m	MPC · JPL
841573	2015 MP_{159}	—	June 27, 2015	Haleakala	Pan-STARRS 1	KON	1.5 km	MPC · JPL
841574	2015 MR_{162}	—	June 25, 2015	Haleakala	Pan-STARRS 1	·	530 m	MPC · JPL
841575	2015 MJ_{166}	—	June 18, 2015	Haleakala	Pan-STARRS 1	·	1.4 km	MPC · JPL
841576	2015 MK_{166}	—	June 18, 2015	Haleakala	Pan-STARRS 1	·	1.4 km	MPC · JPL
841577	2015 MK_{167}	—	June 27, 2015	Haleakala	Pan-STARRS 1	EOS	1.2 km	MPC · JPL
841578	2015 MW_{167}	—	June 26, 2015	Haleakala	Pan-STARRS 1	·	1.4 km	MPC · JPL
841579	2015 MR_{168}	—	June 17, 2015	Haleakala	Pan-STARRS 1	·	1.4 km	MPC · JPL
841580	2015 ME_{171}	—	June 23, 2015	Haleakala	Pan-STARRS 1	·	1.4 km	MPC · JPL
841581	2015 MU_{172}	—	June 25, 2015	Haleakala	Pan-STARRS 1	·	990 m	MPC · JPL
841582	2015 MJ_{173}	—	June 19, 2015	Haleakala	Pan-STARRS 1	EUN	810 m	MPC · JPL
841583	2015 MM_{173}	—	June 17, 2015	Haleakala	Pan-STARRS 1	·	1.4 km	MPC · JPL
841584	2015 MZ_{173}	—	June 18, 2015	Haleakala	Pan-STARRS 1	·	1.1 km	MPC · JPL
841585	2015 MJ_{175}	—	June 21, 2015	Haleakala	Pan-STARRS 1	MAR	720 m	MPC · JPL
841586	2015 MU_{178}	—	June 18, 2015	Haleakala	Pan-STARRS 1	PHO	780 m	MPC · JPL
841587	2015 MW_{179}	—	June 23, 2015	Haleakala	Pan-STARRS 1	·	1.2 km	MPC · JPL
841588	2015 MK_{189}	—	June 19, 2015	Haleakala	Pan-STARRS 1	·	2.0 km	MPC · JPL
841589	2015 MX_{189}	—	June 26, 2015	Haleakala	Pan-STARRS 1	·	1.3 km	MPC · JPL
841590	2015 MO_{190}	—	June 17, 2015	Haleakala	Pan-STARRS 1	·	1.3 km	MPC · JPL
841591	2015 MT_{190}	—	June 20, 2015	Haleakala	Pan-STARRS 1	·	1.3 km	MPC · JPL
841592	2015 MC_{195}	—	June 18, 2015	Haleakala	Pan-STARRS 1	·	870 m	MPC · JPL
841593	2015 MQ_{203}	—	June 26, 2015	Haleakala	Pan-STARRS 1	·	1.7 km	MPC · JPL
841594	2015 NL	—	March 14, 2010	WISE	WISE	·	1.4 km	MPC · JPL
841595	2015 NH_{1}	—	February 27, 2014	Haleakala	Pan-STARRS 1	·	1.5 km	MPC · JPL
841596	2015 NB_{2}	—	April 23, 2009	Catalina	CSS	·	3.9 km	MPC · JPL
841597	2015 NK_{2}	—	May 21, 2015	Haleakala	Pan-STARRS 1	·	2.5 km	MPC · JPL
841598	2015 NC_{3}	—	May 28, 2010	WISE	WISE	BAR	1.9 km	MPC · JPL
841599	2015 NW_{3}	—	May 22, 2010	WISE	WISE	·	2.1 km	MPC · JPL
841600	2015 NK_{8}	—	July 8, 2010	WISE	WISE	EUP	2.8 km	MPC · JPL

== 841601–841700 ==
back to top

Designation			Discovery			Properties		Ref
Permanent	Provisional	Named after	Date	Site	Discoverer(s)	Category	Diam.	Ref
841601	2015 NE_{12}	—	September 24, 2012	Mount Lemmon	Mount Lemmon Survey	V	490 m	MPC · JPL
841602	2015 NE_{13}	—	September 18, 2009	Mount Lemmon	Mount Lemmon Survey	·	670 m	MPC · JPL
841603	2015 NE_{16}	—	September 9, 2004	Kitt Peak	Spacewatch	·	2.4 km	MPC · JPL
841604	2015 NP_{18}	—	July 12, 2015	Haleakala	Pan-STARRS 1	·	2.2 km	MPC · JPL
841605	2015 NN_{25}	—	June 17, 2015	Haleakala	Pan-STARRS 1	PHO	810 m	MPC · JPL
841606	2015 NM_{33}	—	July 12, 2015	Haleakala	Pan-STARRS 1	·	1.3 km	MPC · JPL
841607	2015 ND_{34}	—	November 27, 2000	Sacramento Peak	SDSS	·	1.9 km	MPC · JPL
841608	2015 NV_{36}	—	July 14, 2015	Haleakala	Pan-STARRS 1	·	2.5 km	MPC · JPL
841609	2015 NY_{39}	—	July 12, 2015	Haleakala	Pan-STARRS 1	(1547)	1.0 km	MPC · JPL
841610	2015 NZ_{41}	—	July 6, 2015	Haleakala	Pan-STARRS 1	·	1.3 km	MPC · JPL
841611	2015 OE	—	June 28, 2010	WISE	WISE	·	3.0 km	MPC · JPL
841612	2015 OD_{1}	—	June 10, 2010	WISE	WISE	·	2.2 km	MPC · JPL
841613	2015 OJ_{2}	—	July 19, 2010	WISE	WISE	·	3.1 km	MPC · JPL
841614	2015 OG_{3}	—	July 28, 2010	WISE	WISE	·	1.9 km	MPC · JPL
841615	2015 OW_{4}	—	June 17, 2015	Haleakala	Pan-STARRS 1	·	1.3 km	MPC · JPL
841616	2015 OL_{5}	—	November 25, 2005	Kitt Peak	Spacewatch	·	3.4 km	MPC · JPL
841617	2015 OW_{7}	—	July 11, 2015	Haleakala	Pan-STARRS 1	·	1.9 km	MPC · JPL
841618	2015 OY_{8}	—	May 27, 2010	WISE	WISE	·	1.2 km	MPC · JPL
841619	2015 OD_{10}	—	October 10, 2012	Haleakala	Pan-STARRS 1	·	450 m	MPC · JPL
841620	2015 OT_{11}	—	June 27, 2015	Haleakala	Pan-STARRS 2	·	1.2 km	MPC · JPL
841621	2015 OM_{17}	—	January 29, 2003	Sacramento Peak	SDSS	·	990 m	MPC · JPL
841622	2015 OW_{18}	—	October 10, 1999	Kitt Peak	Spacewatch	·	900 m	MPC · JPL
841623	2015 OW_{19}	—	July 18, 2015	Haleakala	Pan-STARRS 1	H	270 m	MPC · JPL
841624	2015 OO_{20}	—	July 22, 2010	WISE	WISE	·	3.1 km	MPC · JPL
841625	2015 OS_{20}	—	September 5, 2010	Mount Lemmon	Mount Lemmon Survey	·	1.3 km	MPC · JPL
841626	2015 OZ_{20}	—	October 26, 2011	Mayhill-ISON	L. Elenin	ADE	1.6 km	MPC · JPL
841627	2015 OC_{25}	—	June 20, 2010	WISE	WISE	·	2.8 km	MPC · JPL
841628	2015 OF_{31}	—	July 23, 2015	Haleakala	Pan-STARRS 2	·	910 m	MPC · JPL
841629	2015 OG_{32}	—	January 22, 2013	Mount Lemmon	Mount Lemmon Survey	·	590 m	MPC · JPL
841630	2015 OO_{34}	—	September 23, 2011	Haleakala	Pan-STARRS 1	·	1.4 km	MPC · JPL
841631	2015 OS_{35}	—	July 22, 2015	WISE	WISE	AMO +1km	1.4 km	MPC · JPL
841632	2015 OC_{39}	—	August 23, 2004	Kitt Peak	Spacewatch	NYS	900 m	MPC · JPL
841633	2015 OD_{39}	—	July 26, 2011	Haleakala	Pan-STARRS 1	·	900 m	MPC · JPL
841634	2015 OK_{39}	—	October 11, 2005	Kitt Peak	Spacewatch	·	570 m	MPC · JPL
841635	2015 OX_{46}	—	July 24, 2015	Haleakala	Pan-STARRS 1	HNS	770 m	MPC · JPL
841636	2015 OT_{47}	—	January 31, 2009	Mount Lemmon	Mount Lemmon Survey	·	1.1 km	MPC · JPL
841637	2015 OE_{51}	—	June 17, 2015	Haleakala	Pan-STARRS 1	EOS	1.5 km	MPC · JPL
841638	2015 OY_{51}	—	February 13, 2008	Mount Lemmon	Mount Lemmon Survey	·	1.6 km	MPC · JPL
841639	2015 OL_{63}	—	November 12, 2001	Sacramento Peak	SDSS	BRA	1.0 km	MPC · JPL
841640	2015 OO_{64}	—	November 4, 2007	Kitt Peak	Spacewatch	·	2.0 km	MPC · JPL
841641	2015 OT_{66}	—	June 15, 2015	Haleakala	Pan-STARRS 1	·	1.4 km	MPC · JPL
841642	2015 OX_{68}	—	July 9, 2015	Haleakala	Pan-STARRS 1	·	1.1 km	MPC · JPL
841643	2015 OC_{70}	—	June 18, 2010	WISE	WISE	·	1.6 km	MPC · JPL
841644	2015 OV_{72}	—	July 27, 2015	Haleakala	Pan-STARRS 1	·	830 m	MPC · JPL
841645	2015 OB_{79}	—	July 26, 2015	Haleakala	Pan-STARRS 1	AMO	80 m	MPC · JPL
841646	2015 OQ_{83}	—	July 25, 2015	Haleakala	Pan-STARRS 1	·	1.8 km	MPC · JPL
841647	2015 OV_{85}	—	February 21, 2012	Kitt Peak	Spacewatch	·	2.2 km	MPC · JPL
841648	2015 OB_{93}	—	October 18, 2006	Kitt Peak	Spacewatch	·	1.5 km	MPC · JPL
841649	2015 OJ_{96}	—	July 23, 2015	Haleakala	Pan-STARRS 1	·	1.0 km	MPC · JPL
841650	2015 OW_{96}	—	September 18, 2010	Mount Lemmon	Mount Lemmon Survey	EOS	1.5 km	MPC · JPL
841651	2015 OD_{99}	—	January 6, 2006	Kitt Peak	Spacewatch	·	1.6 km	MPC · JPL
841652	2015 OC_{101}	—	April 17, 2005	Kitt Peak	Spacewatch	DOR	1.7 km	MPC · JPL
841653	2015 ON_{102}	—	July 25, 2015	Haleakala	Pan-STARRS 1	·	2.0 km	MPC · JPL
841654	2015 OO_{103}	—	September 17, 2006	Kitt Peak	Spacewatch	AGN	850 m	MPC · JPL
841655	2015 OG_{106}	—	July 25, 2015	Haleakala	Pan-STARRS 1	H	320 m	MPC · JPL
841656	2015 OY_{107}	—	July 23, 2015	Haleakala	Pan-STARRS 1	H	350 m	MPC · JPL
841657	2015 OE_{110}	—	July 25, 2015	Haleakala	Pan-STARRS 1	·	910 m	MPC · JPL
841658	2015 OL_{117}	—	July 28, 2015	Haleakala	Pan-STARRS 1	H	330 m	MPC · JPL
841659	2015 OD_{119}	—	April 23, 2007	Kitt Peak	Spacewatch	NYS	850 m	MPC · JPL
841660	2015 OA_{124}	—	July 23, 2015	Haleakala	Pan-STARRS 1	·	560 m	MPC · JPL
841661	2015 OK_{124}	—	July 24, 2015	Haleakala	Pan-STARRS 1	·	1.6 km	MPC · JPL
841662	2015 OE_{127}	—	July 26, 2015	Haleakala	Pan-STARRS 1	·	1.3 km	MPC · JPL
841663	2015 OX_{127}	—	July 25, 2015	Haleakala	Pan-STARRS 1	·	1.6 km	MPC · JPL
841664	2015 OA_{128}	—	July 25, 2015	Haleakala	Pan-STARRS 1	·	1.3 km	MPC · JPL
841665	2015 OT_{128}	—	July 19, 2015	Haleakala	Pan-STARRS 1	·	1.4 km	MPC · JPL
841666	2015 OB_{129}	—	July 27, 2015	Haleakala	Pan-STARRS 1	AGN	890 m	MPC · JPL
841667	2015 OO_{129}	—	July 25, 2015	Haleakala	Pan-STARRS 1	·	910 m	MPC · JPL
841668	2015 OU_{129}	—	July 23, 2015	Haleakala	Pan-STARRS 1	BRA	1.0 km	MPC · JPL
841669	2015 OJ_{131}	—	July 25, 2015	Haleakala	Pan-STARRS 1	·	1.5 km	MPC · JPL
841670	2015 OP_{131}	—	July 28, 2015	Haleakala	Pan-STARRS 1	·	1.6 km	MPC · JPL
841671	2015 OC_{132}	—	July 25, 2015	Haleakala	Pan-STARRS 1	·	1.3 km	MPC · JPL
841672	2015 OB_{133}	—	July 24, 2015	Haleakala	Pan-STARRS 1	·	1.2 km	MPC · JPL
841673	2015 OF_{133}	—	July 25, 2015	Haleakala	Pan-STARRS 1	EOS	1.5 km	MPC · JPL
841674	2015 OG_{133}	—	July 25, 2015	Haleakala	Pan-STARRS 1	EOS	1.5 km	MPC · JPL
841675	2015 OK_{134}	—	July 23, 2015	Haleakala	Pan-STARRS 1	·	1.4 km	MPC · JPL
841676	2015 OM_{134}	—	July 24, 2015	Haleakala	Pan-STARRS 1	·	1.7 km	MPC · JPL
841677	2015 OT_{134}	—	July 28, 2015	Haleakala	Pan-STARRS 1	TEL	920 m	MPC · JPL
841678	2015 OB_{135}	—	July 25, 2015	Haleakala	Pan-STARRS 1	·	1.4 km	MPC · JPL
841679	2015 OZ_{138}	—	July 23, 2015	Haleakala	Pan-STARRS 1	·	1.1 km	MPC · JPL
841680	2015 OJ_{139}	—	July 25, 2015	Haleakala	Pan-STARRS 1	·	1.4 km	MPC · JPL
841681	2015 OO_{140}	—	July 25, 2015	Haleakala	Pan-STARRS 1	·	1.2 km	MPC · JPL
841682	2015 OQ_{140}	—	July 23, 2015	Haleakala	Pan-STARRS 1	·	1.4 km	MPC · JPL
841683	2015 OB_{142}	—	July 26, 2015	Haleakala	Pan-STARRS 1	·	800 m	MPC · JPL
841684	2015 OT_{142}	—	July 26, 2015	Haleakala	Pan-STARRS 1	·	1.3 km	MPC · JPL
841685	2015 OY_{144}	—	July 28, 2015	Haleakala	Pan-STARRS 1	·	540 m	MPC · JPL
841686	2015 OD_{145}	—	July 24, 2015	Haleakala	Pan-STARRS 1	·	580 m	MPC · JPL
841687	2015 OX_{146}	—	July 23, 2015	Haleakala	Pan-STARRS 1	·	1.6 km	MPC · JPL
841688	2015 OO_{147}	—	July 25, 2015	Haleakala	Pan-STARRS 1	EOS	1.4 km	MPC · JPL
841689	2015 OY_{149}	—	July 25, 2015	Haleakala	Pan-STARRS 1	·	2.3 km	MPC · JPL
841690	2015 OQ_{151}	—	July 23, 2015	Haleakala	Pan-STARRS 2	·	2.1 km	MPC · JPL
841691	2015 OQ_{152}	—	July 19, 2015	Haleakala	Pan-STARRS 1	PHO	750 m	MPC · JPL
841692	2015 OR_{154}	—	July 19, 2015	Haleakala	Pan-STARRS 1	·	1.9 km	MPC · JPL
841693	2015 OH_{155}	—	May 7, 2014	Haleakala	Pan-STARRS 1	THB	2.4 km	MPC · JPL
841694	2015 ON_{156}	—	July 24, 2015	Haleakala	Pan-STARRS 1	·	1.7 km	MPC · JPL
841695	2015 OU_{159}	—	July 24, 2015	Haleakala	Pan-STARRS 1	·	2.0 km	MPC · JPL
841696	2015 ON_{160}	—	July 24, 2015	Haleakala	Pan-STARRS 1	·	1.4 km	MPC · JPL
841697	2015 OX_{164}	—	July 19, 2015	Haleakala	Pan-STARRS 1	KOR	920 m	MPC · JPL
841698	2015 OH_{167}	—	July 19, 2015	Haleakala	Pan-STARRS 1	EOS	1.3 km	MPC · JPL
841699	2015 OZ_{169}	—	July 19, 2015	Haleakala	Pan-STARRS 1	H	340 m	MPC · JPL
841700	2015 OE_{172}	—	July 25, 2015	Haleakala	Pan-STARRS 1	·	710 m	MPC · JPL

== 841701–841800 ==
back to top

Designation			Discovery			Properties		Ref
Permanent	Provisional	Named after	Date	Site	Discoverer(s)	Category	Diam.	Ref
841701	2015 OB_{182}	—	July 19, 2015	Haleakala	Pan-STARRS 1	·	760 m	MPC · JPL
841702	2015 OY_{196}	—	February 5, 2011	Haleakala	Pan-STARRS 1	3:2	3.2 km	MPC · JPL
841703	2015 PD	—	August 3, 2015	Haleakala	Pan-STARRS 1	APO	620 m	MPC · JPL
841704	2015 PL	—	August 7, 2015	Haleakala	Pan-STARRS 1	AMO	330 m	MPC · JPL
841705	2015 PB_{9}	—	July 21, 2006	Mount Lemmon	Mount Lemmon Survey	·	2.1 km	MPC · JPL
841706	2015 PC_{12}	—	October 29, 2005	Mount Lemmon	Mount Lemmon Survey	·	530 m	MPC · JPL
841707	2015 PJ_{13}	—	June 20, 2015	Haleakala	Pan-STARRS 1	·	500 m	MPC · JPL
841708	2015 PS_{14}	—	June 20, 2015	Haleakala	Pan-STARRS 1	·	1.3 km	MPC · JPL
841709	2015 PJ_{15}	—	June 15, 2015	Haleakala	Pan-STARRS 1	·	690 m	MPC · JPL
841710	2015 PW_{18}	—	January 18, 2008	Mount Lemmon	Mount Lemmon Survey	·	2.4 km	MPC · JPL
841711	2015 PM_{20}	—	October 8, 2012	Haleakala	Pan-STARRS 1	·	460 m	MPC · JPL
841712	2015 PA_{21}	—	February 10, 2014	Haleakala	Pan-STARRS 1	·	780 m	MPC · JPL
841713	2015 PA_{22}	—	June 27, 2015	Haleakala	Pan-STARRS 2	·	1.7 km	MPC · JPL
841714	2015 PG_{25}	—	October 22, 2012	Haleakala	Pan-STARRS 1	·	690 m	MPC · JPL
841715	2015 PO_{30}	—	June 27, 2015	Haleakala	Pan-STARRS 1	·	1.0 km	MPC · JPL
841716	2015 PA_{38}	—	July 19, 2010	WISE	WISE	·	2.7 km	MPC · JPL
841717	2015 PA_{40}	—	August 9, 2015	Haleakala	Pan-STARRS 1	·	2.0 km	MPC · JPL
841718	2015 PN_{40}	—	October 15, 2007	Mount Lemmon	Mount Lemmon Survey	·	760 m	MPC · JPL
841719	2015 PK_{42}	—	October 1, 2005	Anderson Mesa	LONEOS	·	560 m	MPC · JPL
841720	2015 PW_{47}	—	February 28, 2008	Mount Lemmon	Mount Lemmon Survey	·	1.8 km	MPC · JPL
841721	2015 PF_{48}	—	June 25, 2015	Haleakala	Pan-STARRS 1	·	920 m	MPC · JPL
841722	2015 PN_{49}	—	July 26, 2010	WISE	WISE	ELF	2.6 km	MPC · JPL
841723	2015 PJ_{50}	—	July 12, 2015	Haleakala	Pan-STARRS 1	·	710 m	MPC · JPL
841724	2015 PM_{53}	—	August 9, 2015	Haleakala	Pan-STARRS 1	·	3.1 km	MPC · JPL
841725	2015 PA_{58}	—	May 12, 2010	WISE	WISE	·	2.2 km	MPC · JPL
841726	2015 PH_{58}	—	November 2, 2011	Mount Lemmon	Mount Lemmon Survey	·	1.1 km	MPC · JPL
841727	2015 PX_{72}	—	January 9, 2014	Kitt Peak	Spacewatch	·	1.1 km	MPC · JPL
841728	2015 PW_{78}	—	February 21, 2007	Mount Lemmon	Mount Lemmon Survey	MAS	500 m	MPC · JPL
841729	2015 PL_{79}	—	July 9, 2015	Kitt Peak	Spacewatch	·	930 m	MPC · JPL
841730	2015 PL_{85}	—	October 25, 2011	Haleakala	Pan-STARRS 1	·	1.7 km	MPC · JPL
841731	2015 PB_{87}	—	January 24, 2014	Haleakala	Pan-STARRS 1	·	900 m	MPC · JPL
841732	2015 PC_{87}	—	July 19, 2015	Haleakala	Pan-STARRS 1	MAS	600 m	MPC · JPL
841733	2015 PJ_{98}	—	June 27, 2015	Haleakala	Pan-STARRS 2	·	1.7 km	MPC · JPL
841734	2015 PY_{98}	—	July 25, 2015	Haleakala	Pan-STARRS 1	·	800 m	MPC · JPL
841735	2015 PR_{100}	—	August 10, 2015	Haleakala	Pan-STARRS 1	·	1.9 km	MPC · JPL
841736	2015 PA_{101}	—	August 10, 2015	Haleakala	Pan-STARRS 1	·	1.1 km	MPC · JPL
841737	2015 PX_{111}	—	October 14, 2001	Sacramento Peak	SDSS	KOR	1.1 km	MPC · JPL
841738	2015 PP_{117}	—	September 18, 2011	Mount Lemmon	Mount Lemmon Survey	·	980 m	MPC · JPL
841739	2015 PW_{121}	—	July 23, 2010	WISE	WISE	LIX	2.2 km	MPC · JPL
841740	2015 PV_{124}	—	August 10, 2015	Haleakala	Pan-STARRS 1	·	1.1 km	MPC · JPL
841741	2015 PB_{125}	—	January 19, 2013	Mount Lemmon	Mount Lemmon Survey	·	670 m	MPC · JPL
841742	2015 PC_{126}	—	August 10, 2015	Haleakala	Pan-STARRS 1	·	1.9 km	MPC · JPL
841743	2015 PJ_{127}	—	August 10, 2015	Haleakala	Pan-STARRS 1	·	1.3 km	MPC · JPL
841744	2015 PD_{153}	—	August 10, 2015	Haleakala	Pan-STARRS 1	·	2.0 km	MPC · JPL
841745	2015 PN_{157}	—	April 19, 2007	Mount Lemmon	Mount Lemmon Survey	NYS	850 m	MPC · JPL
841746	2015 PF_{161}	—	March 28, 2014	Mount Lemmon	Mount Lemmon Survey	·	1.1 km	MPC · JPL
841747	2015 PW_{161}	—	August 10, 2015	Haleakala	Pan-STARRS 1	HOF	1.7 km	MPC · JPL
841748	2015 PV_{163}	—	February 27, 2014	Haleakala	Pan-STARRS 1	·	930 m	MPC · JPL
841749	2015 PQ_{174}	—	October 20, 2012	Haleakala	Pan-STARRS 1	·	500 m	MPC · JPL
841750	2015 PL_{179}	—	March 11, 2007	Mount Lemmon	Mount Lemmon Survey	PHO	720 m	MPC · JPL
841751	2015 PJ_{180}	—	September 24, 2011	Haleakala	Pan-STARRS 1	·	840 m	MPC · JPL
841752	2015 PX_{180}	—	October 20, 2012	Kitt Peak	Spacewatch	·	480 m	MPC · JPL
841753	2015 PL_{181}	—	May 2, 2014	Mount Lemmon	Mount Lemmon Survey	KOR	990 m	MPC · JPL
841754	2015 PR_{187}	—	August 10, 2015	Haleakala	Pan-STARRS 1	·	1.3 km	MPC · JPL
841755	2015 PF_{195}	—	July 24, 2015	Haleakala	Pan-STARRS 1	·	1.3 km	MPC · JPL
841756	2015 PP_{195}	—	June 30, 2010	WISE	WISE	·	910 m	MPC · JPL
841757	2015 PR_{197}	—	October 24, 2011	Kitt Peak	Spacewatch	MRX	750 m	MPC · JPL
841758	2015 PD_{200}	—	July 28, 2015	Haleakala	Pan-STARRS 1	·	840 m	MPC · JPL
841759	2015 PJ_{200}	—	September 6, 2008	Mount Lemmon	Mount Lemmon Survey	·	600 m	MPC · JPL
841760	2015 PV_{203}	—	January 4, 2013	Kitt Peak	Spacewatch	·	1.1 km	MPC · JPL
841761	2015 PS_{204}	—	November 2, 2011	Kitt Peak	Spacewatch	NEM	1.7 km	MPC · JPL
841762	2015 PS_{205}	—	August 10, 2015	Haleakala	Pan-STARRS 1	EOS	1.1 km	MPC · JPL
841763	2015 PY_{213}	—	May 21, 2014	Haleakala	Pan-STARRS 1	·	2.1 km	MPC · JPL
841764	2015 PV_{219}	—	January 11, 2002	Cerro Tololo	Deep Lens Survey	EOS	1.4 km	MPC · JPL
841765	2015 PS_{222}	—	August 10, 2015	Haleakala	Pan-STARRS 1	URS	2.1 km	MPC · JPL
841766	2015 PA_{225}	—	August 10, 2015	Haleakala	Pan-STARRS 1	·	1.1 km	MPC · JPL
841767	2015 PL_{228}	—	July 12, 2015	Haleakala	Pan-STARRS 1	H	310 m	MPC · JPL
841768	2015 PT_{229}	—	May 23, 2014	Haleakala	Pan-STARRS 1	·	2.0 km	MPC · JPL
841769	2015 PF_{231}	—	July 24, 2015	Haleakala	Pan-STARRS 1	·	1.5 km	MPC · JPL
841770	2015 PX_{233}	—	June 28, 2015	Haleakala	Pan-STARRS 1	THM	1.9 km	MPC · JPL
841771	2015 PM_{235}	—	June 26, 2015	Haleakala	Pan-STARRS 1	·	1.5 km	MPC · JPL
841772	2015 PC_{239}	—	August 10, 2015	Haleakala	Pan-STARRS 1	·	930 m	MPC · JPL
841773	2015 PR_{240}	—	June 26, 2015	Haleakala	Pan-STARRS 1	·	1.3 km	MPC · JPL
841774	2015 PM_{244}	—	July 24, 2015	Haleakala	Pan-STARRS 1	VER	1.8 km	MPC · JPL
841775	2015 PV_{245}	—	April 5, 2014	Haleakala	Pan-STARRS 1	HYG	1.8 km	MPC · JPL
841776	2015 PE_{246}	—	May 8, 2014	Haleakala	Pan-STARRS 1	·	1.3 km	MPC · JPL
841777	2015 PF_{248}	—	February 20, 2014	Haleakala	Pan-STARRS 1	·	910 m	MPC · JPL
841778	2015 PH_{252}	—	October 19, 2011	Mount Lemmon	Mount Lemmon Survey	·	1.3 km	MPC · JPL
841779	2015 PL_{252}	—	August 10, 2015	Haleakala	Pan-STARRS 1	·	530 m	MPC · JPL
841780	2015 PJ_{257}	—	August 26, 2012	Haleakala	Pan-STARRS 1	·	480 m	MPC · JPL
841781	2015 PC_{260}	—	July 9, 2015	Haleakala	Pan-STARRS 1	·	1.2 km	MPC · JPL
841782	2015 PJ_{261}	—	June 26, 2015	Haleakala	Pan-STARRS 1	·	1.2 km	MPC · JPL
841783	2015 PV_{262}	—	September 29, 2005	Kitt Peak	Spacewatch	·	470 m	MPC · JPL
841784	2015 PC_{265}	—	May 8, 2010	Mount Lemmon	Mount Lemmon Survey	·	1.2 km	MPC · JPL
841785	2015 PM_{268}	—	August 11, 2015	Haleakala	Pan-STARRS 1	·	1.7 km	MPC · JPL
841786	2015 PP_{269}	—	January 18, 2009	Mount Lemmon	Mount Lemmon Survey	HNS	710 m	MPC · JPL
841787	2015 PX_{269}	—	July 19, 2015	Haleakala	Pan-STARRS 2	EOS	1.3 km	MPC · JPL
841788	2015 PS_{273}	—	August 11, 2015	Haleakala	Pan-STARRS 1	·	1.4 km	MPC · JPL
841789	2015 PM_{276}	—	August 11, 2015	Haleakala	Pan-STARRS 1	·	1.4 km	MPC · JPL
841790	2015 PP_{280}	—	November 28, 2011	Mount Lemmon	Mount Lemmon Survey	·	1.5 km	MPC · JPL
841791	2015 PN_{281}	—	April 7, 2008	Catalina	CSS	·	4.8 km	MPC · JPL
841792	2015 PP_{283}	—	August 8, 2010	WISE	WISE	T_{j} (2.99)	4.2 km	MPC · JPL
841793	2015 PZ_{292}	—	October 19, 2012	Haleakala	Pan-STARRS 1	·	520 m	MPC · JPL
841794	2015 PA_{293}	—	May 30, 2010	WISE	WISE	·	1.3 km	MPC · JPL
841795	2015 PO_{293}	—	May 28, 2010	WISE	WISE	·	2.1 km	MPC · JPL
841796	2015 PZ_{298}	—	October 5, 2002	Sacramento Peak	SDSS	·	1.2 km	MPC · JPL
841797	2015 PW_{300}	—	April 5, 2014	Haleakala	Pan-STARRS 1	·	1.5 km	MPC · JPL
841798	2015 PY_{302}	—	June 7, 2014	Mount Lemmon	Mount Lemmon Survey	·	1.8 km	MPC · JPL
841799	2015 PS_{305}	—	July 24, 2015	Haleakala	Pan-STARRS 1	·	1.4 km	MPC · JPL
841800	2015 PT_{310}	—	July 1, 2010	WISE	WISE	·	2.3 km	MPC · JPL

== 841801–841900 ==
back to top

Designation			Discovery			Properties		Ref
Permanent	Provisional	Named after	Date	Site	Discoverer(s)	Category	Diam.	Ref
841801	2015 PH_{315}	—	September 12, 2007	Mount Lemmon	Mount Lemmon Survey	·	820 m	MPC · JPL
841802	2015 PL_{315}	—	July 12, 2010	WISE	WISE	LIX	3.0 km	MPC · JPL
841803	2015 PK_{318}	—	August 9, 2015	Haleakala	Pan-STARRS 1	·	550 m	MPC · JPL
841804	2015 PL_{319}	—	August 9, 2015	Haleakala	Pan-STARRS 1	EUN	860 m	MPC · JPL
841805	2015 PD_{320}	—	August 12, 2015	Haleakala	Pan-STARRS 1	·	1.8 km	MPC · JPL
841806	2015 PJ_{320}	—	October 28, 2005	Mount Lemmon	Mount Lemmon Survey	·	1.3 km	MPC · JPL
841807	2015 PP_{321}	—	August 13, 2015	Haleakala	Pan-STARRS 1	·	1.3 km	MPC · JPL
841808	2015 PK_{322}	—	September 1, 2010	Mount Lemmon	Mount Lemmon Survey	·	1.2 km	MPC · JPL
841809	2015 PM_{322}	—	August 14, 2015	Haleakala	Pan-STARRS 1	·	1.5 km	MPC · JPL
841810	2015 PO_{324}	—	October 2, 2006	Mount Lemmon	Mount Lemmon Survey	T_{j} (2.85)	2.5 km	MPC · JPL
841811	2015 PY_{324}	—	August 9, 2015	Haleakala	Pan-STARRS 1	·	450 m	MPC · JPL
841812	2015 PP_{325}	—	December 6, 2012	Mount Lemmon	Mount Lemmon Survey	·	510 m	MPC · JPL
841813	2015 PL_{329}	—	June 21, 2010	WISE	WISE	·	2.2 km	MPC · JPL
841814	2015 PR_{331}	—	August 10, 2015	Haleakala	Pan-STARRS 1	·	570 m	MPC · JPL
841815	2015 PH_{333}	—	August 12, 2015	Haleakala	Pan-STARRS 1	·	1.2 km	MPC · JPL
841816	2015 PV_{333}	—	August 14, 2015	Haleakala	Pan-STARRS 1	·	1.2 km	MPC · JPL
841817	2015 PX_{333}	—	August 9, 2015	Haleakala	Pan-STARRS 1	·	960 m	MPC · JPL
841818	2015 PF_{334}	—	August 10, 2015	Haleakala	Pan-STARRS 2	·	1.3 km	MPC · JPL
841819	2015 PO_{334}	—	August 9, 2015	Haleakala	Pan-STARRS 1	EOS	1.4 km	MPC · JPL
841820	2015 PG_{335}	—	August 9, 2015	Haleakala	Pan-STARRS 1	·	1.8 km	MPC · JPL
841821	2015 PH_{337}	—	August 14, 2015	Haleakala	Pan-STARRS 1	·	1.6 km	MPC · JPL
841822	2015 PW_{337}	—	August 14, 2015	Haleakala	Pan-STARRS 1	·	1.5 km	MPC · JPL
841823	2015 PG_{339}	—	August 10, 2015	Haleakala	Pan-STARRS 1	·	1.5 km	MPC · JPL
841824	2015 PQ_{340}	—	August 13, 2015	Haleakala	Pan-STARRS 1	·	1.3 km	MPC · JPL
841825	2015 PE_{343}	—	August 10, 2015	Haleakala	Pan-STARRS 1	·	1.9 km	MPC · JPL
841826	2015 PZ_{346}	—	August 10, 2015	Haleakala	Pan-STARRS 1	·	830 m	MPC · JPL
841827	2015 PA_{347}	—	August 10, 2015	Haleakala	Pan-STARRS 1	·	1.2 km	MPC · JPL
841828	2015 PX_{357}	—	August 9, 2015	Haleakala	Pan-STARRS 1	·	1.2 km	MPC · JPL
841829	2015 PB_{358}	—	September 19, 1998	Sacramento Peak	SDSS	·	1.9 km	MPC · JPL
841830	2015 PS_{371}	—	August 13, 2015	Haleakala	Pan-STARRS 1	·	1.1 km	MPC · JPL
841831	2015 QD	—	May 14, 2010	WISE	WISE	T_{j} (2.94)	3.3 km	MPC · JPL
841832	2015 QF_{1}	—	June 18, 2015	Haleakala	Pan-STARRS 1	·	1.1 km	MPC · JPL
841833	2015 QA_{2}	—	June 8, 2010	WISE	WISE	·	2.8 km	MPC · JPL
841834	2015 QK_{4}	—	June 10, 2010	WISE	WISE	·	2.3 km	MPC · JPL
841835	2015 QE_{12}	—	November 9, 1999	Kitt Peak	Spacewatch	·	1.9 km	MPC · JPL
841836	2015 QA_{16}	—	July 17, 2004	Cerro Tololo	Deep Ecliptic Survey	·	2.1 km	MPC · JPL
841837	2015 QV_{23}	—	August 21, 2015	Haleakala	Pan-STARRS 1	·	1.7 km	MPC · JPL
841838	2015 QL_{24}	—	August 21, 2015	Haleakala	Pan-STARRS 1	·	830 m	MPC · JPL
841839	2015 QZ_{24}	—	August 21, 2015	Haleakala	Pan-STARRS 1	V	530 m	MPC · JPL
841840	2015 QG_{26}	—	August 21, 2015	Haleakala	Pan-STARRS 1	·	1.4 km	MPC · JPL
841841	2015 QL_{26}	—	August 21, 2015	Haleakala	Pan-STARRS 1	EOS	1.2 km	MPC · JPL
841842	2015 QL_{28}	—	August 21, 2015	Haleakala	Pan-STARRS 1	·	1.3 km	MPC · JPL
841843	2015 QR_{29}	—	August 21, 2015	Haleakala	Pan-STARRS 1	·	1.4 km	MPC · JPL
841844	2015 QW_{29}	—	August 19, 2015	Kitt Peak	Spacewatch	·	1.4 km	MPC · JPL
841845	2015 QY_{31}	—	August 21, 2015	Haleakala	Pan-STARRS 1	·	2.4 km	MPC · JPL
841846	2015 QZ_{31}	—	August 20, 2015	Kitt Peak	Spacewatch	·	1.2 km	MPC · JPL
841847	2015 QJ_{32}	—	August 18, 2015	ISON-SSO	L. Elenin	V	500 m	MPC · JPL
841848	2015 QZ_{32}	—	January 21, 2012	Haleakala	Pan-STARRS 1	·	1.6 km	MPC · JPL
841849	2015 QG_{34}	—	August 18, 2015	Kitt Peak	Spacewatch	·	1.3 km	MPC · JPL
841850	2015 RE	—	August 3, 2002	Palomar	NEAT	·	1.3 km	MPC · JPL
841851	2015 RV_{1}	—	July 19, 2015	Haleakala	Pan-STARRS 2	AMO	400 m	MPC · JPL
841852	2015 RK_{3}	—	June 27, 2015	Haleakala	Pan-STARRS 1	·	890 m	MPC · JPL
841853	2015 RB_{8}	—	July 11, 2010	WISE	WISE	·	2.6 km	MPC · JPL
841854	2015 RQ_{9}	—	June 27, 2010	WISE	WISE	·	2.2 km	MPC · JPL
841855	2015 RT_{10}	—	November 4, 2005	Kitt Peak	Spacewatch	·	580 m	MPC · JPL
841856	2015 RZ_{10}	—	June 29, 2010	WISE	WISE	·	2.0 km	MPC · JPL
841857	2015 RQ_{14}	—	June 17, 2015	Haleakala	Pan-STARRS 1	·	760 m	MPC · JPL
841858	2015 RL_{15}	—	September 7, 2004	Kitt Peak	Spacewatch	·	850 m	MPC · JPL
841859	2015 RT_{15}	—	June 25, 2015	Haleakala	Pan-STARRS 1	·	1.3 km	MPC · JPL
841860	2015 RY_{17}	—	October 8, 2008	Mount Lemmon	Mount Lemmon Survey	·	900 m	MPC · JPL
841861	2015 RH_{18}	—	October 25, 2008	Kitt Peak	Spacewatch	·	820 m	MPC · JPL
841862	2015 RO_{23}	—	September 17, 2010	Mount Lemmon	Mount Lemmon Survey	EOS	1.2 km	MPC · JPL
841863	2015 RT_{24}	—	September 10, 2010	Kitt Peak	Spacewatch	·	1.5 km	MPC · JPL
841864	2015 RJ_{25}	—	May 9, 2010	WISE	WISE	·	1.6 km	MPC · JPL
841865	2015 RM_{25}	—	September 6, 2015	XuYi	PMO NEO Survey Program	·	1.8 km	MPC · JPL
841866	2015 RN_{28}	—	July 25, 2015	Haleakala	Pan-STARRS 1	·	1.5 km	MPC · JPL
841867	2015 RQ_{28}	—	July 23, 2010	WISE	WISE	·	2.1 km	MPC · JPL
841868	2015 RZ_{29}	—	July 30, 2005	Palomar	NEAT	·	660 m	MPC · JPL
841869	2015 RM_{39}	—	October 14, 2010	Mount Lemmon	Mount Lemmon Survey	·	1.4 km	MPC · JPL
841870	2015 RO_{40}	—	November 20, 2006	Kitt Peak	Spacewatch	·	1.4 km	MPC · JPL
841871	2015 RS_{45}	—	July 23, 2015	Haleakala	Pan-STARRS 1	·	1.4 km	MPC · JPL
841872	2015 RG_{46}	—	September 10, 2015	Haleakala	Pan-STARRS 1	·	490 m	MPC · JPL
841873	2015 RW_{48}	—	September 10, 2015	Haleakala	Pan-STARRS 1	·	490 m	MPC · JPL
841874	2015 RJ_{49}	—	September 10, 2015	Haleakala	Pan-STARRS 1	·	1.7 km	MPC · JPL
841875	2015 RG_{50}	—	September 10, 2015	Haleakala	Pan-STARRS 1	·	1.1 km	MPC · JPL
841876	2015 RH_{51}	—	September 10, 2015	Haleakala	Pan-STARRS 1	·	1.6 km	MPC · JPL
841877	2015 RS_{51}	—	September 10, 2015	Haleakala	Pan-STARRS 1	·	500 m	MPC · JPL
841878	2015 RY_{54}	—	July 23, 2015	Haleakala	Pan-STARRS 1	·	1.3 km	MPC · JPL
841879	2015 RJ_{55}	—	September 13, 2007	Mount Lemmon	Mount Lemmon Survey	·	730 m	MPC · JPL
841880	2015 RB_{56}	—	September 10, 2015	Haleakala	Pan-STARRS 1	·	1.3 km	MPC · JPL
841881	2015 RB_{57}	—	September 9, 2015	XuYi	PMO NEO Survey Program	·	520 m	MPC · JPL
841882	2015 RB_{61}	—	September 22, 2004	Kitt Peak	Spacewatch	CLA	1.1 km	MPC · JPL
841883	2015 RL_{61}	—	September 10, 2015	Haleakala	Pan-STARRS 1	·	520 m	MPC · JPL
841884	2015 RF_{62}	—	September 10, 2015	Haleakala	Pan-STARRS 1	·	1.4 km	MPC · JPL
841885	2015 RJ_{62}	—	August 27, 2006	Kitt Peak	Spacewatch	·	1.0 km	MPC · JPL
841886	2015 RT_{65}	—	September 10, 2015	Haleakala	Pan-STARRS 1	HNS	750 m	MPC · JPL
841887	2015 RK_{66}	—	March 8, 2013	Haleakala	Pan-STARRS 1	·	1.3 km	MPC · JPL
841888	2015 RQ_{66}	—	July 23, 2015	Haleakala	Pan-STARRS 1	THM	1.5 km	MPC · JPL
841889	2015 RU_{67}	—	October 30, 2005	Kitt Peak	Spacewatch	·	1.2 km	MPC · JPL
841890	2015 RW_{67}	—	September 10, 2015	Haleakala	Pan-STARRS 1	BAP	600 m	MPC · JPL
841891	2015 RQ_{68}	—	September 10, 2015	Haleakala	Pan-STARRS 1	KOR	980 m	MPC · JPL
841892	2015 RP_{69}	—	September 10, 2015	Haleakala	Pan-STARRS 1	·	1.3 km	MPC · JPL
841893	2015 RS_{69}	—	July 23, 2015	Haleakala	Pan-STARRS 1	·	990 m	MPC · JPL
841894	2015 RD_{70}	—	September 10, 2015	Haleakala	Pan-STARRS 1	·	2.3 km	MPC · JPL
841895	2015 RB_{72}	—	September 10, 2015	Haleakala	Pan-STARRS 1	NYS	810 m	MPC · JPL
841896	2015 RE_{73}	—	September 30, 2010	Mount Lemmon	Mount Lemmon Survey	·	1.3 km	MPC · JPL
841897	2015 RE_{74}	—	October 28, 2010	Mount Lemmon	Mount Lemmon Survey	·	1.4 km	MPC · JPL
841898	2015 RW_{80}	—	September 10, 2015	Haleakala	Pan-STARRS 1	·	1.5 km	MPC · JPL
841899	2015 RT_{81}	—	December 24, 2005	Kitt Peak	Spacewatch	·	1.7 km	MPC · JPL
841900	2015 RT_{84}	—	November 12, 2010	Mount Lemmon	Mount Lemmon Survey	·	2.8 km	MPC · JPL

== 841901–842000 ==
back to top

Designation			Discovery			Properties		Ref
Permanent	Provisional	Named after	Date	Site	Discoverer(s)	Category	Diam.	Ref
841901	2015 RO_{86}	—	November 3, 2011	Mount Lemmon	Mount Lemmon Survey	·	1.2 km	MPC · JPL
841902	2015 RD_{89}	—	July 23, 2015	Haleakala	Pan-STARRS 1	·	500 m	MPC · JPL
841903	2015 RS_{90}	—	January 10, 2002	Cerro Tololo	Deep Lens Survey	·	1.3 km	MPC · JPL
841904	2015 RW_{91}	—	August 10, 2015	Haleakala	Pan-STARRS 2	·	540 m	MPC · JPL
841905	2015 RZ_{91}	—	March 9, 2002	Mount Bohyeon	Bohyunsan Optical Astronomy Observatory	·	1.2 km	MPC · JPL
841906	2015 RL_{94}	—	January 28, 2007	Mount Lemmon	Mount Lemmon Survey	·	2.3 km	MPC · JPL
841907	2015 RK_{95}	—	September 6, 2015	Catalina	CSS	·	530 m	MPC · JPL
841908	2015 RV_{95}	—	November 15, 2011	Kitt Peak	Spacewatch	·	960 m	MPC · JPL
841909	2015 RH_{97}	—	October 10, 2008	Mount Lemmon	Mount Lemmon Survey	ERI	1.0 km	MPC · JPL
841910	2015 RT_{97}	—	August 30, 2005	Kitt Peak	Spacewatch	·	530 m	MPC · JPL
841911	2015 RZ_{98}	—	August 19, 2015	Catalina	CSS	·	1.0 km	MPC · JPL
841912	2015 RO_{104}	—	September 24, 2008	Kitt Peak	Spacewatch	·	830 m	MPC · JPL
841913	2015 RA_{106}	—	September 6, 2015	Kitt Peak	Spacewatch	NYS	860 m	MPC · JPL
841914	2015 RT_{107}	—	November 12, 2010	Kitt Peak	Spacewatch	·	1.8 km	MPC · JPL
841915	2015 RB_{108}	—	September 6, 2015	XuYi	PMO NEO Survey Program	PHO	700 m	MPC · JPL
841916	2015 RL_{113}	—	August 21, 2015	Haleakala	Pan-STARRS 1	·	830 m	MPC · JPL
841917	2015 RS_{113}	—	November 14, 2010	Kitt Peak	Spacewatch	·	2.2 km	MPC · JPL
841918	2015 RB_{115}	—	August 21, 2015	Haleakala	Pan-STARRS 1	·	2.0 km	MPC · JPL
841919	2015 RW_{120}	—	July 25, 2015	Haleakala	Pan-STARRS 1	LIX	2.8 km	MPC · JPL
841920	2015 RA_{124}	—	September 9, 2015	Haleakala	Pan-STARRS 1	·	1.8 km	MPC · JPL
841921	2015 RS_{125}	—	September 24, 2011	Haleakala	Pan-STARRS 1	JUN	860 m	MPC · JPL
841922	2015 RC_{130}	—	May 7, 2014	Haleakala	Pan-STARRS 1	·	1.6 km	MPC · JPL
841923	2015 RD_{135}	—	September 4, 2015	Kitt Peak	Spacewatch	·	1.3 km	MPC · JPL
841924	2015 RF_{136}	—	September 9, 2015	Haleakala	Pan-STARRS 1	MAS	520 m	MPC · JPL
841925	2015 RG_{136}	—	September 9, 2015	Haleakala	Pan-STARRS 1	·	1.3 km	MPC · JPL
841926	2015 RV_{136}	—	September 23, 2004	Kitt Peak	Spacewatch	·	2.4 km	MPC · JPL
841927	2015 RG_{137}	—	September 4, 2015	Kitt Peak	Spacewatch	MAS	510 m	MPC · JPL
841928	2015 RH_{144}	—	April 1, 2011	Kitt Peak	Spacewatch	·	590 m	MPC · JPL
841929	2015 RT_{147}	—	May 6, 2010	Mount Lemmon	Mount Lemmon Survey	·	1.2 km	MPC · JPL
841930	2015 RF_{149}	—	June 2, 2014	Mount Lemmon	Mount Lemmon Survey	·	1.4 km	MPC · JPL
841931	2015 RJ_{159}	—	November 24, 2011	Haleakala	Pan-STARRS 1	·	1.2 km	MPC · JPL
841932	2015 RU_{165}	—	September 26, 2005	Kitt Peak	Spacewatch	EOS	1.3 km	MPC · JPL
841933	2015 RO_{176}	—	September 9, 2015	Haleakala	Pan-STARRS 1	·	1.1 km	MPC · JPL
841934	2015 RG_{178}	—	September 9, 2015	Haleakala	Pan-STARRS 1	·	810 m	MPC · JPL
841935	2015 RZ_{181}	—	March 5, 2013	Mount Lemmon	Mount Lemmon Survey	·	1.6 km	MPC · JPL
841936	2015 RW_{186}	—	May 30, 2015	Mount Lemmon	Mount Lemmon Survey	·	1.1 km	MPC · JPL
841937	2015 RH_{187}	—	October 27, 2011	Zelenchukskaya	T. V. Krjačko	·	1.7 km	MPC · JPL
841938	2015 RX_{190}	—	November 12, 2010	Mount Lemmon	Mount Lemmon Survey	·	1.7 km	MPC · JPL
841939	2015 RC_{192}	—	September 11, 2015	Haleakala	Pan-STARRS 1	BRG	900 m	MPC · JPL
841940	2015 RY_{196}	—	July 5, 2000	Kitt Peak	Spacewatch	NYS	990 m	MPC · JPL
841941	2015 RF_{199}	—	July 15, 2010	WISE	WISE	·	1.6 km	MPC · JPL
841942	2015 RL_{199}	—	October 25, 2011	Haleakala	Pan-STARRS 1	·	630 m	MPC · JPL
841943	2015 RZ_{199}	—	September 11, 2015	Haleakala	Pan-STARRS 1	·	760 m	MPC · JPL
841944	2015 RY_{205}	—	September 24, 1960	Palomar Mountain	C. J. van Houten, I. van Houten-Groeneveld, T. Gehrels	·	1.9 km	MPC · JPL
841945	2015 RK_{208}	—	October 25, 2011	Haleakala	Pan-STARRS 1	·	1.2 km	MPC · JPL
841946	2015 RB_{209}	—	September 16, 2010	Mount Lemmon	Mount Lemmon Survey	H	400 m	MPC · JPL
841947	2015 RN_{212}	—	September 23, 2008	Kitt Peak	Spacewatch	·	800 m	MPC · JPL
841948	2015 RC_{219}	—	November 7, 2010	Mount Lemmon	Mount Lemmon Survey	·	1.5 km	MPC · JPL
841949	2015 RO_{220}	—	September 11, 2015	Haleakala	Pan-STARRS 1	·	1.1 km	MPC · JPL
841950	2015 RZ_{227}	—	July 23, 2015	Haleakala	Pan-STARRS 1	·	440 m	MPC · JPL
841951	2015 RM_{228}	—	September 11, 2015	Haleakala	Pan-STARRS 1	·	2.2 km	MPC · JPL
841952	2015 RR_{228}	—	September 11, 2015	Haleakala	Pan-STARRS 1	(5)	750 m	MPC · JPL
841953	2015 RG_{229}	—	November 6, 2010	Kitt Peak	Spacewatch	·	1.6 km	MPC · JPL
841954	2015 RO_{230}	—	September 1, 2010	Mount Lemmon	Mount Lemmon Survey	KOR	930 m	MPC · JPL
841955	2015 RR_{232}	—	October 14, 2010	Mount Lemmon	Mount Lemmon Survey	·	1.2 km	MPC · JPL
841956	2015 RG_{235}	—	September 11, 2015	Haleakala	Pan-STARRS 1	·	1.3 km	MPC · JPL
841957	2015 RT_{246}	—	September 9, 2015	Haleakala	Pan-STARRS 1	H	320 m	MPC · JPL
841958	2015 RG_{247}	—	September 9, 2015	Haleakala	Pan-STARRS 1	H	370 m	MPC · JPL
841959	2015 RQ_{248}	—	May 3, 2010	WISE	WISE	·	2.6 km	MPC · JPL
841960	2015 RV_{248}	—	September 17, 2009	Catalina	CSS	TIR	1.9 km	MPC · JPL
841961	2015 RW_{249}	—	April 5, 2014	Haleakala	Pan-STARRS 1	·	510 m	MPC · JPL
841962	2015 RA_{250}	—	September 10, 2015	Haleakala	Pan-STARRS 1	·	1.1 km	MPC · JPL
841963	2015 RO_{251}	—	September 12, 2015	Haleakala	Pan-STARRS 1	·	670 m	MPC · JPL
841964	2015 RQ_{252}	—	December 14, 2010	Mount Lemmon	Mount Lemmon Survey	·	1.9 km	MPC · JPL
841965	2015 RA_{256}	—	May 25, 2006	Mauna Kea	P. A. Wiegert	·	570 m	MPC · JPL
841966	2015 RF_{259}	—	September 9, 2015	Haleakala	Pan-STARRS 1	HYG	1.8 km	MPC · JPL
841967	2015 RJ_{260}	—	March 2, 2006	Kitt Peak	L. H. Wasserman, R. L. Millis	THM	1.6 km	MPC · JPL
841968	2015 RS_{260}	—	September 12, 2015	Haleakala	Pan-STARRS 1	·	1.3 km	MPC · JPL
841969	2015 RO_{261}	—	October 8, 2007	Mount Lemmon	Mount Lemmon Survey	·	740 m	MPC · JPL
841970	2015 RF_{263}	—	September 6, 2015	Haleakala	Pan-STARRS 1	·	1.5 km	MPC · JPL
841971	2015 RY_{263}	—	October 24, 2011	Haleakala	Pan-STARRS 1	·	1.5 km	MPC · JPL
841972	2015 RH_{265}	—	October 27, 2011	Mount Lemmon	Mount Lemmon Survey	(5)	710 m	MPC · JPL
841973	2015 RG_{266}	—	September 9, 2015	Haleakala	Pan-STARRS 1	·	1.6 km	MPC · JPL
841974	2015 RG_{267}	—	September 9, 2015	Haleakala	Pan-STARRS 1	LIX	2.7 km	MPC · JPL
841975	2015 RH_{267}	—	September 9, 2015	Haleakala	Pan-STARRS 1	·	970 m	MPC · JPL
841976	2015 RF_{268}	—	October 8, 2004	Kitt Peak	Spacewatch	·	2.2 km	MPC · JPL
841977	2015 RP_{268}	—	January 3, 2011	Mount Lemmon	Mount Lemmon Survey	THM	1.9 km	MPC · JPL
841978	2015 RL_{269}	—	September 10, 2015	Haleakala	Pan-STARRS 1	AGN	690 m	MPC · JPL
841979	2015 RR_{269}	—	October 21, 2011	Kitt Peak	Spacewatch	·	1.2 km	MPC · JPL
841980	2015 RU_{269}	—	November 17, 2011	Kitt Peak	Spacewatch	·	1.2 km	MPC · JPL
841981	2015 RK_{270}	—	September 18, 2006	Kitt Peak	Spacewatch	·	1.5 km	MPC · JPL
841982	2015 RR_{271}	—	February 14, 2013	Haleakala	Pan-STARRS 1	·	1.2 km	MPC · JPL
841983	2015 RK_{272}	—	May 21, 2014	Haleakala	Pan-STARRS 1	·	1.4 km	MPC · JPL
841984	2015 RV_{272}	—	September 11, 2015	Haleakala	Pan-STARRS 1	EOS	1.1 km	MPC · JPL
841985	2015 RA_{283}	—	September 12, 2015	Haleakala	Pan-STARRS 1	·	1.5 km	MPC · JPL
841986	2015 RG_{291}	—	September 9, 2015	Haleakala	Pan-STARRS 1	·	760 m	MPC · JPL
841987	2015 RF_{295}	—	March 1, 2009	Kitt Peak	Spacewatch	·	950 m	MPC · JPL
841988	2015 RK_{301}	—	September 11, 2015	Haleakala	Pan-STARRS 1	V	430 m	MPC · JPL
841989	2015 RB_{303}	—	September 9, 2015	Haleakala	Pan-STARRS 1	NYS	890 m	MPC · JPL
841990	2015 RB_{304}	—	August 23, 2001	Kitt Peak	Spacewatch	·	1.6 km	MPC · JPL
841991	2015 RO_{305}	—	September 11, 2015	Haleakala	Pan-STARRS 1	·	1.0 km	MPC · JPL
841992	2015 RU_{305}	—	September 9, 2015	Haleakala	Pan-STARRS 1	MAS	610 m	MPC · JPL
841993	2015 RZ_{306}	—	September 11, 2015	Haleakala	Pan-STARRS 1	·	450 m	MPC · JPL
841994	2015 RQ_{307}	—	September 9, 2015	Haleakala	Pan-STARRS 1	H	270 m	MPC · JPL
841995	2015 RZ_{308}	—	September 8, 2015	Haleakala	Pan-STARRS 1	·	1.3 km	MPC · JPL
841996	2015 RD_{309}	—	September 12, 2015	Haleakala	Pan-STARRS 1	KOR	910 m	MPC · JPL
841997	2015 RZ_{310}	—	September 6, 2015	Kitt Peak	Spacewatch	·	880 m	MPC · JPL
841998	2015 RS_{315}	—	September 9, 2015	Haleakala	Pan-STARRS 1	·	1.7 km	MPC · JPL
841999	2015 RX_{315}	—	September 12, 2015	Haleakala	Pan-STARRS 1	·	1.9 km	MPC · JPL
842000	2015 RA_{316}	—	September 9, 2015	Haleakala	Pan-STARRS 1	EUP	2.6 km	MPC · JPL

back to top

== Meaning of names ==
As minor planet discoveries are confirmed, they are given a permanent number by the IAU's Minor Planet Center (MPC), and the discoverers can then submit names for them, following the IAU's naming conventions. The list below concerns those minor planets in the specified number-range that have received names, and explains the meanings of those names.

Official naming citations of newly named small Solar System bodies are approved and published in a bulletin by IAU's Working Group for Small Bodies Nomenclature (WGSBN). Before May 2021, citations were published in MPC's Minor Planet Circulars for many decades. Recent citations can also be found on the JPL Small-Body Database (SBDB). Until his death in 2016, German astronomer Lutz D. Schmadel compiled these citations into the Dictionary of Minor Planet Names (DMP) and regularly updated the collection.

Based on Paul Herget's The Names of the Minor Planets, Schmadel also researched the unclear origin of numerous asteroids, most of which had been named prior to World War II. This article incorporates text from this source, which is in the public domain: SBDB New namings may only be added to this list below after official publication as the preannouncement of names is condemned. The WGSBN publishes a comprehensive guideline for the naming rules of non-cometary small Solar System bodies.

Named minor planet	Provisional	This minor planet was named for...	Ref · Catalog
841529 Jonahwoodhams	2015 MJ_{81}	Jonah David Woodhams, great-grandson of the discoverer.	IAU · 841529
