= List of minor planets: 587001–588000 =

The following is a partial list of minor planets, running from minor-planet number 587001 through 588000, inclusive. The primary data for this and other partial lists is based on JPL's "Small-Body Orbital Elements" and data available from the Minor Planet Center. Critical list information is also provided by the MPC, unless otherwise specified from Lowell Observatory. A detailed description of the table's columns and additional sources are given on the main page including a complete list of every page in this series, and a statistical break-up on the dynamical classification of minor planets.

Also see the summary list of all named bodies in numerical and alphabetical order, and the corresponding naming citations for the number range of this particular list. New namings may only be added to this list after official publication, as the preannouncement of names is condemned by the Working Group for Small Bodies Nomenclature of the International Astronomical Union.

| Near-Earth obj. | MBA (inner) | MBA (outer) | Centaur |
| Mars-crosser | MBA (middle) | Jupiter trojan | Trans-Neptunian obj. |
| Unclassified |

== 587001–587100 ==
| Designation | | | Discovery | | | Properties | | Ref |
| Permanent | Provisional | Named after | Date | Site | Discoverer(s) | Category | Diam. | Ref |
|---|---|---|---|---|---|---|---|---|
| 587001 | 2005 QG_{25} | — | August 27, 2005 | Kitt Peak | Spacewatch | · | 2.0 km | MPC · JPL |
| 587002 | 2005 QN_{48} | — | August 28, 2005 | Kitt Peak | Spacewatch | · | 570 m | MPC · JPL |
| 587003 | 2005 QG_{57} | — | August 30, 2005 | Vicques | M. Ory | · | 2.5 km | MPC · JPL |
| 587004 | 2005 QP_{76} | — | August 6, 2005 | Palomar | NEAT | · | 750 m | MPC · JPL |
| 587005 | 2005 QZ_{103} | — | August 29, 2005 | Kitt Peak | Spacewatch | · | 2.1 km | MPC · JPL |
| 587006 | 2005 QF_{116} | — | August 28, 2005 | Kitt Peak | Spacewatch | · | 1.8 km | MPC · JPL |
| 587007 | 2005 QH_{122} | — | August 28, 2005 | Kitt Peak | Spacewatch | · | 1.6 km | MPC · JPL |
| 587008 | 2005 QB_{137} | — | August 28, 2005 | Kitt Peak | Spacewatch | EOS | 1.7 km | MPC · JPL |
| 587009 | 2005 QG_{144} | — | August 26, 2005 | Palomar | NEAT | EOS | 2.3 km | MPC · JPL |
| 587010 | 2005 QE_{152} | — | August 30, 2005 | Kitt Peak | Spacewatch | · | 1.9 km | MPC · JPL |
| 587011 | 2005 QR_{161} | — | July 29, 2005 | Palomar | NEAT | · | 2.1 km | MPC · JPL |
| 587012 | 2005 QG_{169} | — | August 30, 2005 | Palomar | NEAT | · | 2.1 km | MPC · JPL |
| 587013 | 2005 QB_{189} | — | August 31, 2005 | Palomar | NEAT | T_{j} (2.94) | 5.9 km | MPC · JPL |
| 587014 | 2005 QM_{191} | — | April 28, 2012 | Mount Lemmon | Mount Lemmon Survey | · | 960 m | MPC · JPL |
| 587015 | 2005 QK_{192} | — | August 30, 2005 | Kitt Peak | Spacewatch | · | 2.3 km | MPC · JPL |
| 587016 | 2005 QN_{192} | — | February 9, 2013 | Haleakala | Pan-STARRS 1 | · | 2.4 km | MPC · JPL |
| 587017 | 2005 QO_{192} | — | August 29, 2005 | Palomar | NEAT | EOS | 1.6 km | MPC · JPL |
| 587018 | 2005 QR_{192} | — | October 26, 2011 | Haleakala | Pan-STARRS 1 | · | 2.0 km | MPC · JPL |
| 587019 | 2005 QX_{192} | — | August 30, 2005 | Kitt Peak | Spacewatch | · | 880 m | MPC · JPL |
| 587020 | 2005 QZ_{192} | — | January 17, 2013 | Kitt Peak | Spacewatch | EOS | 1.5 km | MPC · JPL |
| 587021 | 2005 QC_{193} | — | August 30, 2005 | Kitt Peak | Spacewatch | · | 830 m | MPC · JPL |
| 587022 | 2005 QG_{198} | — | October 8, 2016 | Haleakala | Pan-STARRS 1 | · | 2.3 km | MPC · JPL |
| 587023 | 2005 QH_{199} | — | September 21, 2017 | Haleakala | Pan-STARRS 1 | · | 1.2 km | MPC · JPL |
| 587024 | 2005 QR_{200} | — | August 29, 2005 | Kitt Peak | Spacewatch | 3:2 | 4.1 km | MPC · JPL |
| 587025 | 2005 QS_{200} | — | December 15, 2011 | Haleakala | Pan-STARRS 1 | H | 470 m | MPC · JPL |
| 587026 | 2005 QP_{201} | — | August 30, 2005 | Kitt Peak | Spacewatch | · | 1.6 km | MPC · JPL |
| 587027 | 2005 QQ_{201} | — | August 28, 2005 | Kitt Peak | Spacewatch | · | 740 m | MPC · JPL |
| 587028 | 2005 QW_{204} | — | August 30, 2005 | Kitt Peak | Spacewatch | T_{j} (2.98) · 3:2 | 4.6 km | MPC · JPL |
| 587029 | 2005 QJ_{205} | — | August 29, 2005 | Kitt Peak | Spacewatch | EOS | 1.5 km | MPC · JPL |
| 587030 | 2005 QL_{205} | — | August 28, 2005 | Kitt Peak | Spacewatch | · | 1.9 km | MPC · JPL |
| 587031 | 2005 RM_{19} | — | September 1, 2005 | Palomar | NEAT | · | 850 m | MPC · JPL |
| 587032 | 2005 RO_{28} | — | September 12, 2005 | Kitt Peak | Spacewatch | TIR | 3.1 km | MPC · JPL |
| 587033 | 2005 RU_{32} | — | September 13, 2005 | Vallemare Borbona | V. S. Casulli | · | 2.0 km | MPC · JPL |
| 587034 | 2005 RX_{35} | — | September 3, 2005 | Mauna Kea | Veillet, C. | EOS | 1.4 km | MPC · JPL |
| 587035 | 2005 RA_{36} | — | September 3, 2005 | Mauna Kea | Veillet, C. | · | 1.7 km | MPC · JPL |
| 587036 | 2005 RT_{42} | — | August 30, 2005 | Kitt Peak | Spacewatch | · | 2.1 km | MPC · JPL |
| 587037 | 2005 RW_{45} | — | September 28, 2005 | Apache Point | SDSS Collaboration | · | 1.8 km | MPC · JPL |
| 587038 | 2005 RG_{48} | — | October 27, 2005 | Catalina | CSS | · | 3.1 km | MPC · JPL |
| 587039 | 2005 RC_{52} | — | September 3, 2005 | Palomar | NEAT | · | 3.1 km | MPC · JPL |
| 587040 | 2005 RL_{53} | — | September 13, 2005 | Kitt Peak | Spacewatch | EOS | 1.4 km | MPC · JPL |
| 587041 | 2005 RX_{55} | — | March 6, 2013 | Haleakala | Pan-STARRS 1 | · | 2.2 km | MPC · JPL |
| 587042 | 2005 RD_{57} | — | March 28, 2011 | Kitt Peak | Spacewatch | 3:2 · SHU | 4.4 km | MPC · JPL |
| 587043 | 2005 RL_{60} | — | September 1, 2005 | Kitt Peak | Spacewatch | · | 1.5 km | MPC · JPL |
| 587044 | 2005 RN_{60} | — | September 1, 2005 | Kitt Peak | Spacewatch | · | 2.0 km | MPC · JPL |
| 587045 | 2005 SC_{78} | — | September 24, 2005 | Kitt Peak | Spacewatch | THM | 1.6 km | MPC · JPL |
| 587046 | 2005 SQ_{115} | — | September 27, 2005 | Kitt Peak | Spacewatch | 3:2 | 4.1 km | MPC · JPL |
| 587047 | 2005 SQ_{126} | — | September 24, 2005 | Kitt Peak | Spacewatch | · | 1.8 km | MPC · JPL |
| 587048 | 2005 SS_{141} | — | September 25, 2005 | Kitt Peak | Spacewatch | · | 1.7 km | MPC · JPL |
| 587049 | 2005 SE_{142} | — | September 25, 2005 | Kitt Peak | Spacewatch | · | 820 m | MPC · JPL |
| 587050 | 2005 SM_{143} | — | August 31, 2005 | Palomar | NEAT | · | 2.2 km | MPC · JPL |
| 587051 | 2005 SA_{155} | — | September 26, 2005 | Kitt Peak | Spacewatch | · | 1.4 km | MPC · JPL |
| 587052 | 2005 SX_{171} | — | September 29, 2005 | Kitt Peak | Spacewatch | · | 620 m | MPC · JPL |
| 587053 | 2005 SF_{181} | — | September 29, 2005 | Kitt Peak | Spacewatch | · | 2.8 km | MPC · JPL |
| 587054 | 2005 SE_{201} | — | September 30, 2005 | Kitt Peak | Spacewatch | · | 2.1 km | MPC · JPL |
| 587055 | 2005 SE_{208} | — | September 30, 2005 | Kitt Peak | Spacewatch | · | 1.0 km | MPC · JPL |
| 587056 | 2005 SO_{208} | — | September 30, 2005 | Mount Lemmon | Mount Lemmon Survey | EOS | 1.4 km | MPC · JPL |
| 587057 | 2005 SS_{208} | — | September 30, 2005 | Mount Lemmon | Mount Lemmon Survey | · | 1.8 km | MPC · JPL |
| 587058 | 2005 SD_{228} | — | September 13, 2005 | Kitt Peak | Spacewatch | · | 1.7 km | MPC · JPL |
| 587059 | 2005 SS_{241} | — | April 4, 2002 | Palomar | NEAT | LIX | 3.5 km | MPC · JPL |
| 587060 | 2005 SX_{259} | — | September 25, 2005 | Kitt Peak | Spacewatch | MAS | 610 m | MPC · JPL |
| 587061 | 2005 SB_{260} | — | September 26, 2005 | Kitt Peak | Spacewatch | · | 1.9 km | MPC · JPL |
| 587062 | 2005 SF_{267} | — | September 29, 2005 | Kitt Peak | Spacewatch | · | 1.8 km | MPC · JPL |
| 587063 | 2005 SW_{277} | — | September 30, 2005 | Mauna Kea | A. Boattini | · | 760 m | MPC · JPL |
| 587064 | 2005 SY_{277} | — | September 30, 2005 | Mauna Kea | A. Boattini | V | 620 m | MPC · JPL |
| 587065 | 2005 SY_{281} | — | October 1, 2005 | Apache Point | SDSS Collaboration | EOS | 1.7 km | MPC · JPL |
| 587066 | 2005 SF_{282} | — | September 23, 2005 | Kitt Peak | Spacewatch | 3:2 | 4.8 km | MPC · JPL |
| 587067 | 2005 SP_{282} | — | September 29, 2005 | Mount Lemmon | Mount Lemmon Survey | · | 1.5 km | MPC · JPL |
| 587068 | 2005 SL_{285} | — | October 1, 2005 | Apache Point | SDSS Collaboration | · | 2.5 km | MPC · JPL |
| 587069 | 2005 SN_{286} | — | October 11, 2005 | Apache Point | SDSS Collaboration | fast | 1.9 km | MPC · JPL |
| 587070 | 2005 SE_{294} | — | November 12, 2005 | Kitt Peak | Spacewatch | HNS | 1.3 km | MPC · JPL |
| 587071 | 2005 SQ_{294} | — | September 30, 2005 | Mount Lemmon | Mount Lemmon Survey | · | 630 m | MPC · JPL |
| 587072 | 2005 SB_{295} | — | September 29, 2005 | Kitt Peak | Spacewatch | · | 2.9 km | MPC · JPL |
| 587073 | 2005 SD_{295} | — | September 29, 2005 | Kitt Peak | Spacewatch | · | 3.1 km | MPC · JPL |
| 587074 | 2005 SP_{295} | — | September 29, 2005 | Kitt Peak | Spacewatch | · | 2.6 km | MPC · JPL |
| 587075 | 2005 SC_{296} | — | September 26, 2005 | Kitt Peak | Spacewatch | · | 590 m | MPC · JPL |
| 587076 | 2005 SL_{297} | — | February 13, 2013 | Haleakala | Pan-STARRS 1 | EOS | 1.5 km | MPC · JPL |
| 587077 | 2005 SS_{297} | — | February 28, 2008 | Mount Lemmon | Mount Lemmon Survey | EOS | 1.5 km | MPC · JPL |
| 587078 | 2005 SE_{300} | — | September 1, 2013 | Haleakala | Pan-STARRS 1 | · | 710 m | MPC · JPL |
| 587079 | 2005 SZ_{300} | — | September 30, 2005 | Mauna Kea | A. Boattini | · | 1.1 km | MPC · JPL |
| 587080 | 2005 SA_{301} | — | September 30, 2005 | Mount Lemmon | Mount Lemmon Survey | · | 2.3 km | MPC · JPL |
| 587081 | 2005 SC_{301} | — | September 29, 2005 | Mount Lemmon | Mount Lemmon Survey | KOR | 940 m | MPC · JPL |
| 587082 | 2005 SQ_{301} | — | September 29, 2005 | Mount Lemmon | Mount Lemmon Survey | THM | 1.8 km | MPC · JPL |
| 587083 | 2005 TO_{8} | — | October 1, 2005 | Kitt Peak | Spacewatch | THM | 1.7 km | MPC · JPL |
| 587084 | 2005 TA_{23} | — | March 14, 2004 | Kitt Peak | Spacewatch | H | 410 m | MPC · JPL |
| 587085 | 2005 TG_{26} | — | October 1, 2005 | Mount Lemmon | Mount Lemmon Survey | · | 2.2 km | MPC · JPL |
| 587086 | 2005 TX_{29} | — | September 26, 2005 | Socorro | LINEAR | · | 2.5 km | MPC · JPL |
| 587087 | 2005 TP_{35} | — | October 1, 2005 | Kitt Peak | Spacewatch | EOS | 1.8 km | MPC · JPL |
| 587088 | 2005 TC_{37} | — | October 1, 2005 | Mount Lemmon | Mount Lemmon Survey | · | 680 m | MPC · JPL |
| 587089 | 2005 TA_{39} | — | September 25, 2005 | Kitt Peak | Spacewatch | THM | 1.7 km | MPC · JPL |
| 587090 | 2005 TH_{39} | — | September 25, 2005 | Kitt Peak | Spacewatch | THM | 1.6 km | MPC · JPL |
| 587091 | 2005 TF_{67} | — | October 5, 2005 | Mount Lemmon | Mount Lemmon Survey | · | 500 m | MPC · JPL |
| 587092 | 2005 TG_{69} | — | October 6, 2005 | Mount Lemmon | Mount Lemmon Survey | THM | 1.6 km | MPC · JPL |
| 587093 | 2005 TJ_{84} | — | October 3, 2005 | Kitt Peak | Spacewatch | · | 450 m | MPC · JPL |
| 587094 | 2005 TD_{85} | — | October 3, 2005 | Kitt Peak | Spacewatch | 3:2 · SHU | 5.0 km | MPC · JPL |
| 587095 | 2005 TQ_{109} | — | October 7, 2005 | Kitt Peak | Spacewatch | · | 800 m | MPC · JPL |
| 587096 | 2005 TZ_{109} | — | September 29, 2005 | Kitt Peak | Spacewatch | 3:2 | 3.8 km | MPC · JPL |
| 587097 | 2005 TC_{124} | — | March 5, 2002 | Apache Point | SDSS Collaboration | · | 2.7 km | MPC · JPL |
| 587098 | 2005 TO_{138} | — | September 29, 2005 | Kitt Peak | Spacewatch | H | 410 m | MPC · JPL |
| 587099 | 2005 TE_{139} | — | October 8, 2005 | Kitt Peak | Spacewatch | · | 1.9 km | MPC · JPL |
| 587100 | 2005 TP_{145} | — | October 8, 2005 | Kitt Peak | Spacewatch | · | 760 m | MPC · JPL |

== 587101–587200 ==
back to top

| Designation | | | Discovery | | | Properties | | Ref |
| Permanent | Provisional | Named after | Date | Site | Discoverer(s) | Category | Diam. | Ref |
|---|---|---|---|---|---|---|---|---|
| 587101 | 2005 TX_{146} | — | October 8, 2005 | Kitt Peak | Spacewatch | · | 2.2 km | MPC · JPL |
| 587102 | 2005 TE_{147} | — | October 8, 2005 | Kitt Peak | Spacewatch | 3:2 | 4.8 km | MPC · JPL |
| 587103 | 2005 TS_{148} | — | September 29, 2005 | Kitt Peak | Spacewatch | · | 1.1 km | MPC · JPL |
| 587104 | 2005 TL_{149} | — | October 8, 2005 | Kitt Peak | Spacewatch | · | 940 m | MPC · JPL |
| 587105 | 2005 TY_{154} | — | October 1, 2005 | Catalina | CSS | · | 2.5 km | MPC · JPL |
| 587106 | 2005 TA_{156} | — | October 9, 2005 | Kitt Peak | Spacewatch | EOS | 1.5 km | MPC · JPL |
| 587107 | 2005 TO_{175} | — | October 3, 2005 | Catalina | CSS | · | 560 m | MPC · JPL |
| 587108 | 2005 TX_{175} | — | August 25, 2005 | Palomar | NEAT | · | 2.2 km | MPC · JPL |
| 587109 | 2005 TS_{177} | — | October 4, 2005 | Palomar | NEAT | · | 2.1 km | MPC · JPL |
| 587110 | 2005 TD_{182} | — | October 3, 2005 | Kitt Peak | Spacewatch | · | 2.3 km | MPC · JPL |
| 587111 | 2005 TJ_{197} | — | August 27, 2005 | Anderson Mesa | LONEOS | T_{j} (2.95) · 3:2 | 5.5 km | MPC · JPL |
| 587112 | 2005 TC_{200} | — | April 13, 2008 | Kitt Peak | Spacewatch | · | 3.1 km | MPC · JPL |
| 587113 | 2005 TN_{200} | — | January 10, 2007 | Kitt Peak | Spacewatch | EOS | 1.8 km | MPC · JPL |
| 587114 | 2005 TV_{200} | — | April 23, 2004 | Desert Eagle | W. K. Y. Yeung | · | 700 m | MPC · JPL |
| 587115 | 2005 TP_{201} | — | September 11, 2010 | Mount Lemmon | Mount Lemmon Survey | · | 2.3 km | MPC · JPL |
| 587116 | 2005 TK_{202} | — | November 24, 2011 | Haleakala | Pan-STARRS 1 | · | 2.4 km | MPC · JPL |
| 587117 | 2005 TM_{203} | — | October 1, 2005 | Kitt Peak | Spacewatch | · | 2.0 km | MPC · JPL |
| 587118 | 2005 TE_{205} | — | February 7, 2008 | Mount Lemmon | Mount Lemmon Survey | · | 2.4 km | MPC · JPL |
| 587119 | 2005 TL_{205} | — | December 24, 2006 | Kitt Peak | Spacewatch | EOS | 1.8 km | MPC · JPL |
| 587120 | 2005 TX_{205} | — | February 15, 2013 | ESA OGS | ESA OGS | EOS | 1.5 km | MPC · JPL |
| 587121 | 2005 TP_{206} | — | March 22, 2015 | Kitt Peak | Spacewatch | · | 730 m | MPC · JPL |
| 587122 | 2005 TZ_{206} | — | March 17, 2013 | Mount Lemmon | Mount Lemmon Survey | HYG | 2.0 km | MPC · JPL |
| 587123 | 2005 TP_{207} | — | March 13, 2007 | Mount Nyukasa | Japan Aerospace Exploration Agency | · | 870 m | MPC · JPL |
| 587124 | 2005 TF_{210} | — | October 1, 2005 | Mount Lemmon | Mount Lemmon Survey | EOS | 1.6 km | MPC · JPL |
| 587125 | 2005 TZ_{213} | — | October 7, 2005 | Kitt Peak | Spacewatch | EOS | 1.6 km | MPC · JPL |
| 587126 | 2005 TM_{214} | — | October 11, 2005 | Kitt Peak | Spacewatch | · | 1.9 km | MPC · JPL |
| 587127 | 2005 UP_{30} | — | October 11, 2005 | Kitt Peak | Spacewatch | · | 590 m | MPC · JPL |
| 587128 | 2005 UR_{62} | — | October 25, 2005 | Mount Lemmon | Mount Lemmon Survey | THM | 1.8 km | MPC · JPL |
| 587129 | 2005 UK_{77} | — | October 24, 2005 | Palomar | NEAT | · | 2.2 km | MPC · JPL |
| 587130 | 2005 UV_{87} | — | October 22, 2005 | Kitt Peak | Spacewatch | · | 1.9 km | MPC · JPL |
| 587131 | 2005 US_{99} | — | October 22, 2005 | Kitt Peak | Spacewatch | · | 2.1 km | MPC · JPL |
| 587132 | 2005 US_{101} | — | October 22, 2005 | Kitt Peak | Spacewatch | · | 2.3 km | MPC · JPL |
| 587133 | 2005 UN_{121} | — | October 24, 2005 | Kitt Peak | Spacewatch | · | 2.6 km | MPC · JPL |
| 587134 | 2005 UP_{125} | — | October 24, 2005 | Kitt Peak | Spacewatch | · | 3.3 km | MPC · JPL |
| 587135 | 2005 UL_{137} | — | October 25, 2005 | Mount Lemmon | Mount Lemmon Survey | · | 2.4 km | MPC · JPL |
| 587136 | 2005 UP_{145} | — | October 26, 2005 | Kitt Peak | Spacewatch | · | 2.6 km | MPC · JPL |
| 587137 | 2005 UO_{150} | — | September 29, 2005 | Mount Lemmon | Mount Lemmon Survey | EOS | 1.8 km | MPC · JPL |
| 587138 | 2005 UP_{150} | — | September 27, 2005 | Kitt Peak | Spacewatch | · | 2.4 km | MPC · JPL |
| 587139 | 2005 UV_{156} | — | October 24, 2005 | Kitt Peak | Spacewatch | · | 2.3 km | MPC · JPL |
| 587140 | 2005 UQ_{164} | — | October 24, 2005 | Kitt Peak | Spacewatch | THM | 1.8 km | MPC · JPL |
| 587141 | 2005 UU_{169} | — | October 24, 2005 | Kitt Peak | Spacewatch | · | 630 m | MPC · JPL |
| 587142 | 2005 UU_{194} | — | October 1, 2005 | Catalina | CSS | H | 560 m | MPC · JPL |
| 587143 | 2005 UW_{212} | — | October 27, 2005 | Kitt Peak | Spacewatch | · | 2.6 km | MPC · JPL |
| 587144 | 2005 UZ_{218} | — | October 25, 2005 | Kitt Peak | Spacewatch | · | 2.1 km | MPC · JPL |
| 587145 | 2005 UH_{237} | — | October 25, 2005 | Kitt Peak | Spacewatch | · | 800 m | MPC · JPL |
| 587146 | 2005 UC_{239} | — | October 25, 2005 | Kitt Peak | Spacewatch | · | 740 m | MPC · JPL |
| 587147 | 2005 UJ_{245} | — | October 25, 2005 | Kitt Peak | Spacewatch | · | 2.8 km | MPC · JPL |
| 587148 | 2005 UC_{263} | — | October 27, 2005 | Kitt Peak | Spacewatch | · | 2.4 km | MPC · JPL |
| 587149 | 2005 UP_{264} | — | September 30, 2005 | Mount Lemmon | Mount Lemmon Survey | EOS | 1.6 km | MPC · JPL |
| 587150 | 2005 UU_{273} | — | October 22, 2005 | Kitt Peak | Spacewatch | H | 370 m | MPC · JPL |
| 587151 | 2005 UB_{295} | — | October 26, 2005 | Kitt Peak | Spacewatch | · | 1.7 km | MPC · JPL |
| 587152 | 2005 UN_{296} | — | October 26, 2005 | Kitt Peak | Spacewatch | EOS | 1.8 km | MPC · JPL |
| 587153 | 2005 UA_{297} | — | October 26, 2005 | Kitt Peak | Spacewatch | · | 2.6 km | MPC · JPL |
| 587154 | 2005 UL_{312} | — | October 29, 2005 | Catalina | CSS | · | 880 m | MPC · JPL |
| 587155 | 2005 UD_{321} | — | October 27, 2005 | Kitt Peak | Spacewatch | · | 2.2 km | MPC · JPL |
| 587156 | 2005 UH_{324} | — | October 29, 2005 | Kitt Peak | Spacewatch | · | 2.0 km | MPC · JPL |
| 587157 | 2005 UT_{327} | — | October 29, 2005 | Kitt Peak | Spacewatch | (5) | 970 m | MPC · JPL |
| 587158 | 2005 UR_{335} | — | October 30, 2005 | Kitt Peak | Spacewatch | · | 890 m | MPC · JPL |
| 587159 | 2005 UD_{339} | — | October 31, 2005 | Kitt Peak | Spacewatch | (43176) | 2.7 km | MPC · JPL |
| 587160 | 2005 UV_{340} | — | August 25, 2000 | Cerro Tololo | Deep Ecliptic Survey | · | 1.4 km | MPC · JPL |
| 587161 | 2005 UK_{346} | — | October 30, 2005 | Kitt Peak | Spacewatch | · | 2.5 km | MPC · JPL |
| 587162 | 2005 UY_{348} | — | October 24, 2005 | Palomar | NEAT | · | 2.2 km | MPC · JPL |
| 587163 | 2005 UB_{356} | — | October 30, 2005 | Kitt Peak | Spacewatch | · | 2.4 km | MPC · JPL |
| 587164 | 2005 UV_{360} | — | October 22, 2005 | Kitt Peak | Spacewatch | · | 2.2 km | MPC · JPL |
| 587165 | 2005 US_{364} | — | October 27, 2005 | Kitt Peak | Spacewatch | · | 770 m | MPC · JPL |
| 587166 | 2005 UA_{376} | — | October 27, 2005 | Kitt Peak | Spacewatch | · | 1.9 km | MPC · JPL |
| 587167 | 2005 UE_{383} | — | October 22, 2005 | Kitt Peak | Spacewatch | · | 700 m | MPC · JPL |
| 587168 | 2005 UT_{384} | — | October 22, 2005 | Kitt Peak | Spacewatch | EOS | 1.7 km | MPC · JPL |
| 587169 | 2005 UV_{386} | — | October 30, 2005 | Mount Lemmon | Mount Lemmon Survey | · | 850 m | MPC · JPL |
| 587170 | 2005 UB_{393} | — | October 30, 2005 | Mount Lemmon | Mount Lemmon Survey | THM | 2.0 km | MPC · JPL |
| 587171 | 2005 UW_{403} | — | October 29, 2005 | Mount Lemmon | Mount Lemmon Survey | · | 550 m | MPC · JPL |
| 587172 | 2005 UE_{404} | — | October 29, 2005 | Kitt Peak | Spacewatch | · | 2.1 km | MPC · JPL |
| 587173 | 2005 UL_{418} | — | October 25, 2005 | Kitt Peak | Spacewatch | · | 740 m | MPC · JPL |
| 587174 | 2005 UH_{425} | — | October 28, 2005 | Kitt Peak | Spacewatch | · | 3.0 km | MPC · JPL |
| 587175 | 2005 UH_{427} | — | October 28, 2005 | Kitt Peak | Spacewatch | · | 2.9 km | MPC · JPL |
| 587176 | 2005 UC_{435} | — | October 29, 2005 | Mount Lemmon | Mount Lemmon Survey | · | 780 m | MPC · JPL |
| 587177 | 2005 UR_{435} | — | October 29, 2005 | Mount Lemmon | Mount Lemmon Survey | · | 2.2 km | MPC · JPL |
| 587178 | 2005 UB_{440} | — | October 23, 2005 | Catalina | CSS | · | 2.4 km | MPC · JPL |
| 587179 | 2005 UP_{445} | — | May 1, 2003 | Kitt Peak | Spacewatch | · | 1.4 km | MPC · JPL |
| 587180 | 2005 US_{450} | — | October 27, 2005 | Mount Lemmon | Mount Lemmon Survey | · | 820 m | MPC · JPL |
| 587181 | 2005 UX_{453} | — | October 30, 2005 | Mount Lemmon | Mount Lemmon Survey | TIR | 2.2 km | MPC · JPL |
| 587182 | 2005 UH_{458} | — | October 30, 2005 | Mount Lemmon | Mount Lemmon Survey | · | 1.1 km | MPC · JPL |
| 587183 | 2005 US_{461} | — | October 1, 2005 | Mount Lemmon | Mount Lemmon Survey | TIR | 1.5 km | MPC · JPL |
| 587184 | 2005 UG_{499} | — | February 13, 2002 | Apache Point | SDSS Collaboration | · | 2.8 km | MPC · JPL |
| 587185 | 2005 UD_{508} | — | December 27, 2011 | Mount Lemmon | Mount Lemmon Survey | HYG | 2.2 km | MPC · JPL |
| 587186 | 2005 UZ_{515} | — | October 27, 2005 | Apache Point | SDSS Collaboration | · | 860 m | MPC · JPL |
| 587187 | 2005 UZ_{518} | — | October 25, 2005 | Apache Point | SDSS Collaboration | · | 2.5 km | MPC · JPL |
| 587188 | 2005 UX_{521} | — | October 27, 2005 | Apache Point | SDSS Collaboration | HYG | 1.9 km | MPC · JPL |
| 587189 | 2005 UF_{522} | — | October 27, 2005 | Catalina | CSS | · | 2.6 km | MPC · JPL |
| 587190 | 2005 UO_{528} | — | December 27, 2006 | Mount Lemmon | Mount Lemmon Survey | · | 2.2 km | MPC · JPL |
| 587191 | 2005 UJ_{529} | — | October 25, 2005 | Kitt Peak | Spacewatch | · | 1.9 km | MPC · JPL |
| 587192 | 2005 US_{529} | — | October 29, 2005 | Mount Lemmon | Mount Lemmon Survey | · | 2.9 km | MPC · JPL |
| 587193 | 2005 UR_{533} | — | October 30, 2005 | Mount Lemmon | Mount Lemmon Survey | EOS | 1.9 km | MPC · JPL |
| 587194 | 2005 UV_{533} | — | October 29, 2005 | Kitt Peak | Spacewatch | · | 840 m | MPC · JPL |
| 587195 | 2005 UW_{533} | — | October 29, 2005 | Mount Lemmon | Mount Lemmon Survey | · | 2.7 km | MPC · JPL |
| 587196 | 2005 UZ_{533} | — | November 24, 2011 | Mount Lemmon | Mount Lemmon Survey | · | 2.3 km | MPC · JPL |
| 587197 | 2005 UK_{534} | — | October 22, 2005 | Kitt Peak | Spacewatch | · | 1.1 km | MPC · JPL |
| 587198 | 2005 UV_{534} | — | December 21, 2006 | Mount Lemmon | Mount Lemmon Survey | · | 2.4 km | MPC · JPL |
| 587199 | 2005 UX_{534} | — | October 15, 2013 | Mount Lemmon | Mount Lemmon Survey | · | 1.3 km | MPC · JPL |
| 587200 | 2005 UY_{534} | — | October 27, 2005 | Mount Lemmon | Mount Lemmon Survey | · | 4.1 km | MPC · JPL |

== 587201–587300 ==
back to top

| Designation | | | Discovery | | | Properties | | Ref |
| Permanent | Provisional | Named after | Date | Site | Discoverer(s) | Category | Diam. | Ref |
|---|---|---|---|---|---|---|---|---|
| 587201 | 2005 UZ_{534} | — | October 26, 2009 | Kitt Peak | Spacewatch | · | 1.2 km | MPC · JPL |
| 587202 | 2005 UG_{535} | — | October 1, 2010 | Kitt Peak | Spacewatch | EOS | 1.4 km | MPC · JPL |
| 587203 | 2005 UO_{535} | — | October 24, 2005 | Kitt Peak | Spacewatch | LIX | 3.0 km | MPC · JPL |
| 587204 | 2005 UT_{535} | — | August 12, 2010 | Kitt Peak | Spacewatch | THM | 1.9 km | MPC · JPL |
| 587205 | 2005 UM_{536} | — | January 18, 2013 | Mount Lemmon | Mount Lemmon Survey | · | 2.3 km | MPC · JPL |
| 587206 | 2005 UV_{538} | — | October 29, 2005 | Kitt Peak | Spacewatch | · | 2.5 km | MPC · JPL |
| 587207 | 2005 UH_{539} | — | September 28, 2009 | Mount Lemmon | Mount Lemmon Survey | · | 1.2 km | MPC · JPL |
| 587208 | 2005 UL_{539} | — | April 5, 2008 | Mount Lemmon | Mount Lemmon Survey | · | 2.8 km | MPC · JPL |
| 587209 | 2005 UW_{539} | — | July 19, 2015 | Haleakala | Pan-STARRS 1 | · | 2.6 km | MPC · JPL |
| 587210 | 2005 UF_{540} | — | October 26, 2005 | Kitt Peak | Spacewatch | · | 890 m | MPC · JPL |
| 587211 | 2005 UK_{540} | — | December 27, 2006 | Mount Lemmon | Mount Lemmon Survey | · | 2.4 km | MPC · JPL |
| 587212 | 2005 UQ_{543} | — | October 25, 2005 | Mount Lemmon | Mount Lemmon Survey | · | 960 m | MPC · JPL |
| 587213 | 2005 US_{544} | — | April 10, 2014 | Haleakala | Pan-STARRS 1 | · | 2.3 km | MPC · JPL |
| 587214 | 2005 UG_{545} | — | March 18, 2013 | Mount Lemmon | Mount Lemmon Survey | · | 2.4 km | MPC · JPL |
| 587215 | 2005 UY_{545} | — | October 9, 2015 | Haleakala | Pan-STARRS 1 | · | 1.4 km | MPC · JPL |
| 587216 | 2005 UQ_{546} | — | September 30, 2005 | Mount Lemmon | Mount Lemmon Survey | · | 2.0 km | MPC · JPL |
| 587217 | 2005 UE_{547} | — | October 27, 2005 | Kitt Peak | Spacewatch | · | 1.6 km | MPC · JPL |
| 587218 | 2005 UT_{547} | — | October 25, 2005 | Kitt Peak | Spacewatch | · | 1.8 km | MPC · JPL |
| 587219 | 2005 UA_{548} | — | October 22, 2005 | Kitt Peak | Spacewatch | · | 1.0 km | MPC · JPL |
| 587220 | 2005 UK_{549} | — | October 27, 2005 | Kitt Peak | Spacewatch | · | 1.2 km | MPC · JPL |
| 587221 | 2005 UO_{553} | — | October 28, 2005 | Kitt Peak | Spacewatch | · | 510 m | MPC · JPL |
| 587222 | 2005 VL_{5} | — | November 3, 2005 | Mount Lemmon | Mount Lemmon Survey | EOS | 1.8 km | MPC · JPL |
| 587223 | 2005 VD_{10} | — | November 2, 2005 | Mount Lemmon | Mount Lemmon Survey | · | 2.9 km | MPC · JPL |
| 587224 | 2005 VE_{18} | — | October 12, 2005 | Kitt Peak | Spacewatch | · | 2.2 km | MPC · JPL |
| 587225 | 2005 VZ_{24} | — | November 1, 2005 | Kitt Peak | Spacewatch | · | 1.8 km | MPC · JPL |
| 587226 | 2005 VV_{28} | — | November 4, 2005 | Kitt Peak | Spacewatch | MAR | 760 m | MPC · JPL |
| 587227 | 2005 VL_{29} | — | November 1, 2005 | Kitt Peak | Spacewatch | NYS | 720 m | MPC · JPL |
| 587228 | 2005 VB_{39} | — | November 3, 2005 | Mount Lemmon | Mount Lemmon Survey | · | 2.1 km | MPC · JPL |
| 587229 | 2005 VR_{39} | — | November 4, 2005 | Mount Lemmon | Mount Lemmon Survey | · | 2.3 km | MPC · JPL |
| 587230 | 2005 VO_{49} | — | November 2, 2005 | Socorro | LINEAR | · | 2.4 km | MPC · JPL |
| 587231 | 2005 VV_{58} | — | October 30, 2005 | Kitt Peak | Spacewatch | · | 640 m | MPC · JPL |
| 587232 | 2005 VH_{62} | — | October 7, 2005 | Mount Lemmon | Mount Lemmon Survey | · | 670 m | MPC · JPL |
| 587233 | 2005 VL_{70} | — | November 5, 2005 | Mount Lemmon | Mount Lemmon Survey | (5) | 850 m | MPC · JPL |
| 587234 | 2005 VT_{72} | — | November 6, 2005 | Mount Lemmon | Mount Lemmon Survey | · | 2.4 km | MPC · JPL |
| 587235 | 2005 VZ_{83} | — | October 30, 2005 | Mount Lemmon | Mount Lemmon Survey | (5) | 1.1 km | MPC · JPL |
| 587236 | 2005 VJ_{84} | — | October 27, 2005 | Kitt Peak | Spacewatch | · | 1.4 km | MPC · JPL |
| 587237 | 2005 VF_{85} | — | November 4, 2005 | Mount Lemmon | Mount Lemmon Survey | · | 950 m | MPC · JPL |
| 587238 | 2005 VR_{87} | — | November 6, 2005 | Kitt Peak | Spacewatch | · | 1.1 km | MPC · JPL |
| 587239 | 2005 VM_{88} | — | October 25, 2005 | Kitt Peak | Spacewatch | · | 1.7 km | MPC · JPL |
| 587240 | 2005 VV_{91} | — | October 29, 2005 | Kitt Peak | Spacewatch | · | 1.1 km | MPC · JPL |
| 587241 | 2005 VH_{93} | — | November 6, 2005 | Mount Lemmon | Mount Lemmon Survey | EOS | 1.7 km | MPC · JPL |
| 587242 | 2005 VF_{94} | — | November 6, 2005 | Mount Lemmon | Mount Lemmon Survey | · | 2.2 km | MPC · JPL |
| 587243 | 2005 VX_{94} | — | November 6, 2005 | Kitt Peak | Spacewatch | · | 2.5 km | MPC · JPL |
| 587244 | 2005 VS_{95} | — | November 6, 2005 | Kitt Peak | Spacewatch | · | 2.7 km | MPC · JPL |
| 587245 | 2005 VT_{113} | — | April 9, 2002 | Palomar | NEAT | · | 2.4 km | MPC · JPL |
| 587246 | 2005 VV_{114} | — | November 11, 2005 | Kitt Peak | Spacewatch | TIR | 2.9 km | MPC · JPL |
| 587247 | 2005 VY_{114} | — | November 11, 2005 | Kitt Peak | Spacewatch | EOS | 1.5 km | MPC · JPL |
| 587248 | 2005 VB_{125} | — | November 7, 2005 | Mauna Kea | A. Boattini | · | 650 m | MPC · JPL |
| 587249 | 2005 VP_{135} | — | November 12, 2005 | Kitt Peak | Spacewatch | · | 3.8 km | MPC · JPL |
| 587250 | 2005 VZ_{137} | — | November 1, 2005 | Mount Lemmon | Mount Lemmon Survey | · | 540 m | MPC · JPL |
| 587251 | 2005 VB_{138} | — | November 1, 2005 | Mount Lemmon | Mount Lemmon Survey | · | 550 m | MPC · JPL |
| 587252 | 2005 VT_{138} | — | November 6, 2005 | Kitt Peak | Spacewatch | · | 2.7 km | MPC · JPL |
| 587253 | 2005 VG_{139} | — | November 12, 2005 | Kitt Peak | Spacewatch | · | 2.4 km | MPC · JPL |
| 587254 | 2005 VK_{139} | — | November 3, 2005 | Kitt Peak | Spacewatch | EOS | 1.8 km | MPC · JPL |
| 587255 | 2005 VR_{139} | — | November 11, 2005 | Kitt Peak | Spacewatch | · | 2.7 km | MPC · JPL |
| 587256 | 2005 VO_{140} | — | March 13, 2012 | Mount Lemmon | Mount Lemmon Survey | · | 1.7 km | MPC · JPL |
| 587257 | 2005 VW_{140} | — | September 29, 2009 | Mount Lemmon | Mount Lemmon Survey | · | 1.2 km | MPC · JPL |
| 587258 | 2005 VF_{141} | — | January 29, 2012 | Haleakala | Pan-STARRS 1 | · | 2.3 km | MPC · JPL |
| 587259 | 2005 VX_{142} | — | November 12, 2005 | Kitt Peak | Spacewatch | · | 1.3 km | MPC · JPL |
| 587260 | 2005 VE_{143} | — | April 15, 2008 | Mount Lemmon | Mount Lemmon Survey | EOS | 2.1 km | MPC · JPL |
| 587261 | 2005 VK_{143} | — | November 3, 2005 | Kitt Peak | Spacewatch | · | 2.5 km | MPC · JPL |
| 587262 | 2005 VY_{143} | — | September 28, 2009 | Kitt Peak | Spacewatch | · | 960 m | MPC · JPL |
| 587263 | 2005 VC_{147} | — | June 7, 2014 | Haleakala | Pan-STARRS 1 | · | 550 m | MPC · JPL |
| 587264 | 2005 VW_{147} | — | February 15, 2013 | Haleakala | Pan-STARRS 1 | VER | 2.2 km | MPC · JPL |
| 587265 | 2005 VM_{148} | — | November 10, 2005 | Mount Lemmon | Mount Lemmon Survey | · | 2.6 km | MPC · JPL |
| 587266 | 2005 VS_{148} | — | November 7, 2005 | Mauna Kea | A. Boattini | · | 1.2 km | MPC · JPL |
| 587267 | 2005 VB_{150} | — | November 12, 2005 | Kitt Peak | Spacewatch | · | 2.0 km | MPC · JPL |
| 587268 | 2005 WK_{13} | — | November 22, 2005 | Kitt Peak | Spacewatch | · | 2.3 km | MPC · JPL |
| 587269 | 2005 WE_{39} | — | November 25, 2005 | Mount Lemmon | Mount Lemmon Survey | HOF | 1.8 km | MPC · JPL |
| 587270 | 2005 WS_{63} | — | November 10, 2005 | Mount Lemmon | Mount Lemmon Survey | · | 990 m | MPC · JPL |
| 587271 | 2005 WM_{65} | — | November 21, 2005 | Kitt Peak | Spacewatch | JUN | 890 m | MPC · JPL |
| 587272 | 2005 WD_{70} | — | April 7, 2002 | Cerro Tololo | Deep Ecliptic Survey | THM | 2.0 km | MPC · JPL |
| 587273 | 2005 WF_{84} | — | November 26, 2005 | Mount Lemmon | Mount Lemmon Survey | · | 510 m | MPC · JPL |
| 587274 | 2005 WM_{95} | — | November 26, 2005 | Kitt Peak | Spacewatch | · | 860 m | MPC · JPL |
| 587275 | 2005 WG_{96} | — | November 26, 2005 | Kitt Peak | Spacewatch | · | 2.4 km | MPC · JPL |
| 587276 | 2005 WJ_{108} | — | November 29, 2005 | Anderson Mesa | LONEOS | H | 450 m | MPC · JPL |
| 587277 | 2005 WL_{109} | — | November 22, 2005 | Kitt Peak | Spacewatch | VER | 2.9 km | MPC · JPL |
| 587278 | 2005 WH_{111} | — | July 29, 2000 | Cerro Tololo | Deep Ecliptic Survey | (5) | 1.2 km | MPC · JPL |
| 587279 | 2005 WR_{124} | — | November 25, 2005 | Kitt Peak | Spacewatch | · | 2.1 km | MPC · JPL |
| 587280 | 2005 WJ_{126} | — | November 25, 2005 | Mount Lemmon | Mount Lemmon Survey | · | 2.9 km | MPC · JPL |
| 587281 | 2005 WW_{133} | — | November 25, 2005 | Mount Lemmon | Mount Lemmon Survey | VER | 2.2 km | MPC · JPL |
| 587282 | 2005 WT_{137} | — | October 27, 2005 | Kitt Peak | Spacewatch | EUN | 900 m | MPC · JPL |
| 587283 | 2005 WD_{138} | — | November 3, 2005 | Kitt Peak | Spacewatch | · | 980 m | MPC · JPL |
| 587284 | 2005 WG_{143} | — | October 30, 2005 | Mount Lemmon | Mount Lemmon Survey | LIX | 2.6 km | MPC · JPL |
| 587285 | 2005 WU_{144} | — | November 6, 2005 | Mount Lemmon | Mount Lemmon Survey | · | 2.7 km | MPC · JPL |
| 587286 | 2005 WF_{165} | — | November 29, 2005 | Mount Lemmon | Mount Lemmon Survey | LIX | 3.2 km | MPC · JPL |
| 587287 | 2005 WP_{167} | — | November 10, 2005 | Kitt Peak | Spacewatch | · | 1.4 km | MPC · JPL |
| 587288 | 2005 WD_{169} | — | November 30, 2005 | Kitt Peak | Spacewatch | EOS | 1.5 km | MPC · JPL |
| 587289 | 2005 WM_{169} | — | October 30, 2005 | Mount Lemmon | Mount Lemmon Survey | · | 2.4 km | MPC · JPL |
| 587290 | 2005 WT_{169} | — | November 30, 2005 | Mount Lemmon | Mount Lemmon Survey | · | 2.6 km | MPC · JPL |
| 587291 | 2005 WH_{171} | — | November 30, 2005 | Kitt Peak | Spacewatch | · | 580 m | MPC · JPL |
| 587292 | 2005 WG_{173} | — | November 30, 2005 | Kitt Peak | Spacewatch | · | 2.9 km | MPC · JPL |
| 587293 | 2005 WX_{176} | — | November 30, 2005 | Kitt Peak | Spacewatch | · | 1.1 km | MPC · JPL |
| 587294 | 2005 WR_{185} | — | November 30, 2005 | Anderson Mesa | LONEOS | EUN | 1.1 km | MPC · JPL |
| 587295 | 2005 WD_{188} | — | November 30, 2005 | Kitt Peak | Spacewatch | · | 2.7 km | MPC · JPL |
| 587296 | 2005 WH_{203} | — | November 30, 2005 | Kitt Peak | Spacewatch | · | 880 m | MPC · JPL |
| 587297 | 2005 WU_{204} | — | November 25, 2005 | Mount Lemmon | Mount Lemmon Survey | · | 1.2 km | MPC · JPL |
| 587298 | 2005 WL_{206} | — | September 30, 2005 | Mount Lemmon | Mount Lemmon Survey | · | 1.1 km | MPC · JPL |
| 587299 Holmgren | 2005 WJ_{209} | Holmgren | November 25, 2005 | Mauna Kea | P. A. Wiegert, D. D. Balam | MAR | 720 m | MPC · JPL |
| 587300 | 2005 WS_{210} | — | October 25, 2005 | Mount Lemmon | Mount Lemmon Survey | · | 460 m | MPC · JPL |

== 587301–587400 ==
back to top

| Designation | | | Discovery | | | Properties | | Ref |
| Permanent | Provisional | Named after | Date | Site | Discoverer(s) | Category | Diam. | Ref |
|---|---|---|---|---|---|---|---|---|
| 587301 | 2005 WV_{210} | — | November 22, 2005 | Kitt Peak | Spacewatch | · | 1.3 km | MPC · JPL |
| 587302 | 2005 WO_{211} | — | November 26, 2005 | Mount Lemmon | Mount Lemmon Survey | · | 2.5 km | MPC · JPL |
| 587303 | 2005 WJ_{212} | — | September 17, 2012 | Mount Lemmon | Mount Lemmon Survey | 3:2 | 4.3 km | MPC · JPL |
| 587304 | 2005 WM_{212} | — | November 25, 2005 | Kitt Peak | Spacewatch | EOS | 1.9 km | MPC · JPL |
| 587305 | 2005 WO_{212} | — | November 26, 2005 | Catalina | CSS | · | 2.0 km | MPC · JPL |
| 587306 | 2005 WW_{212} | — | November 24, 2005 | Palomar | NEAT | T_{j} (2.99) | 3.7 km | MPC · JPL |
| 587307 | 2005 WH_{213} | — | October 31, 2016 | Mount Lemmon | Mount Lemmon Survey | · | 3.2 km | MPC · JPL |
| 587308 | 2005 WW_{214} | — | November 26, 2005 | Mount Lemmon | Mount Lemmon Survey | · | 930 m | MPC · JPL |
| 587309 | 2005 WE_{216} | — | April 12, 2016 | Haleakala | Pan-STARRS 1 | · | 910 m | MPC · JPL |
| 587310 | 2005 WN_{216} | — | November 14, 1995 | Kitt Peak | Spacewatch | · | 460 m | MPC · JPL |
| 587311 | 2005 WU_{216} | — | November 21, 2005 | Kitt Peak | Spacewatch | · | 490 m | MPC · JPL |
| 587312 | 2005 WY_{218} | — | November 29, 2005 | Mount Lemmon | Mount Lemmon Survey | · | 2.4 km | MPC · JPL |
| 587313 | 2005 XO_{18} | — | December 1, 2005 | Kitt Peak | Spacewatch | THM | 2.4 km | MPC · JPL |
| 587314 | 2005 XX_{19} | — | December 2, 2005 | Kitt Peak | Spacewatch | EOS | 2.2 km | MPC · JPL |
| 587315 | 2005 XC_{25} | — | December 3, 2005 | Kitt Peak | Spacewatch | HNS | 960 m | MPC · JPL |
| 587316 | 2005 XV_{37} | — | November 30, 2005 | Kitt Peak | Spacewatch | · | 3.2 km | MPC · JPL |
| 587317 | 2005 XY_{37} | — | December 4, 2005 | Kitt Peak | Spacewatch | · | 950 m | MPC · JPL |
| 587318 | 2005 XL_{40} | — | December 5, 2005 | Mount Lemmon | Mount Lemmon Survey | MAR | 810 m | MPC · JPL |
| 587319 | 2005 XJ_{43} | — | November 21, 2005 | Kitt Peak | Spacewatch | · | 3.0 km | MPC · JPL |
| 587320 | 2005 XK_{43} | — | December 2, 2005 | Kitt Peak | Spacewatch | · | 2.3 km | MPC · JPL |
| 587321 | 2005 XE_{46} | — | December 2, 2005 | Kitt Peak | Spacewatch | · | 1.1 km | MPC · JPL |
| 587322 | 2005 XE_{50} | — | December 2, 2005 | Kitt Peak | Spacewatch | · | 1.6 km | MPC · JPL |
| 587323 | 2005 XD_{73} | — | December 6, 2005 | Kitt Peak | Spacewatch | VER | 2.4 km | MPC · JPL |
| 587324 | 2005 XW_{73} | — | December 6, 2005 | Kitt Peak | Spacewatch | · | 780 m | MPC · JPL |
| 587325 | 2005 XZ_{74} | — | December 6, 2005 | Kitt Peak | Spacewatch | · | 3.1 km | MPC · JPL |
| 587326 | 2005 XS_{75} | — | December 6, 2005 | Kitt Peak | Spacewatch | · | 3.1 km | MPC · JPL |
| 587327 | 2005 XO_{76} | — | December 8, 2005 | Kitt Peak | Spacewatch | · | 3.2 km | MPC · JPL |
| 587328 | 2005 XL_{78} | — | December 1, 2005 | Catalina | CSS | · | 2.9 km | MPC · JPL |
| 587329 | 2005 XU_{95} | — | December 1, 2005 | Kitt Peak | Wasserman, L. H., Millis, R. L. | THM | 2.0 km | MPC · JPL |
| 587330 | 2005 XU_{102} | — | December 1, 2005 | Kitt Peak | Wasserman, L. H., Millis, R. L. | VER | 2.2 km | MPC · JPL |
| 587331 | 2005 XH_{111} | — | December 3, 2005 | Mauna Kea | A. Boattini | · | 630 m | MPC · JPL |
| 587332 | 2005 XV_{112} | — | October 1, 2005 | Mount Lemmon | Mount Lemmon Survey | · | 2.5 km | MPC · JPL |
| 587333 | 2005 XA_{120} | — | October 28, 2005 | Mount Lemmon | Mount Lemmon Survey | · | 2.2 km | MPC · JPL |
| 587334 | 2005 XF_{120} | — | March 26, 2007 | Mount Lemmon | Mount Lemmon Survey | · | 1.2 km | MPC · JPL |
| 587335 | 2005 XP_{120} | — | December 5, 2005 | Kitt Peak | Spacewatch | · | 3.3 km | MPC · JPL |
| 587336 | 2005 XT_{120} | — | November 4, 2010 | La Sagra | OAM | · | 3.2 km | MPC · JPL |
| 587337 | 2005 XO_{121} | — | November 25, 2005 | Kitt Peak | Spacewatch | · | 2.6 km | MPC · JPL |
| 587338 | 2005 XB_{122} | — | November 4, 2016 | Haleakala | Pan-STARRS 1 | · | 2.4 km | MPC · JPL |
| 587339 | 2005 XA_{123} | — | July 19, 2015 | Haleakala | Pan-STARRS 1 | VER | 2.2 km | MPC · JPL |
| 587340 | 2005 XD_{125} | — | December 10, 2005 | Kitt Peak | Spacewatch | EOS | 2.6 km | MPC · JPL |
| 587341 | 2005 XK_{125} | — | May 11, 2002 | Socorro | LINEAR | THB | 3.0 km | MPC · JPL |
| 587342 | 2005 XN_{125} | — | November 25, 2005 | Kitt Peak | Spacewatch | VER | 2.7 km | MPC · JPL |
| 587343 | 2005 XZ_{125} | — | November 3, 2005 | Mount Lemmon | Mount Lemmon Survey | ADE | 1.5 km | MPC · JPL |
| 587344 | 2005 XU_{126} | — | October 28, 2016 | Haleakala | Pan-STARRS 1 | EOS | 1.7 km | MPC · JPL |
| 587345 | 2005 XF_{127} | — | March 1, 2011 | Catalina | CSS | JUN | 1.0 km | MPC · JPL |
| 587346 | 2005 XM_{129} | — | February 3, 2013 | Haleakala | Pan-STARRS 1 | · | 630 m | MPC · JPL |
| 587347 | 2005 XN_{130} | — | April 6, 2010 | Catalina | CSS | · | 550 m | MPC · JPL |
| 587348 | 2005 XB_{131} | — | December 5, 2005 | Mount Lemmon | Mount Lemmon Survey | VER | 2.4 km | MPC · JPL |
| 587349 | 2005 XO_{131} | — | July 28, 2015 | Haleakala | Pan-STARRS 1 | VER | 2.4 km | MPC · JPL |
| 587350 | 2005 XQ_{133} | — | December 1, 2005 | Mount Lemmon | Mount Lemmon Survey | · | 2.6 km | MPC · JPL |
| 587351 | 2005 YD_{31} | — | December 2, 2005 | Mount Lemmon | Mount Lemmon Survey | · | 540 m | MPC · JPL |
| 587352 | 2005 YT_{35} | — | December 25, 2005 | Kitt Peak | Spacewatch | · | 2.8 km | MPC · JPL |
| 587353 | 2005 YZ_{51} | — | December 26, 2005 | Mount Lemmon | Mount Lemmon Survey | · | 2.8 km | MPC · JPL |
| 587354 | 2005 YV_{56} | — | September 21, 2000 | Kitt Peak | Spacewatch | (5) | 910 m | MPC · JPL |
| 587355 | 2005 YH_{60} | — | December 22, 2005 | Kitt Peak | Spacewatch | EUP | 3.2 km | MPC · JPL |
| 587356 | 2005 YE_{66} | — | December 25, 2005 | Kitt Peak | Spacewatch | · | 2.4 km | MPC · JPL |
| 587357 | 2005 YE_{76} | — | November 10, 2005 | Mount Lemmon | Mount Lemmon Survey | · | 910 m | MPC · JPL |
| 587358 | 2005 YN_{76} | — | December 24, 2005 | Kitt Peak | Spacewatch | · | 3.5 km | MPC · JPL |
| 587359 | 2005 YT_{76} | — | December 5, 2005 | Mount Lemmon | Mount Lemmon Survey | VER | 3.0 km | MPC · JPL |
| 587360 | 2005 YL_{80} | — | December 24, 2005 | Kitt Peak | Spacewatch | · | 3.0 km | MPC · JPL |
| 587361 | 2005 YP_{103} | — | December 5, 2005 | Kitt Peak | Spacewatch | · | 3.5 km | MPC · JPL |
| 587362 | 2005 YL_{112} | — | December 25, 2005 | Mount Lemmon | Mount Lemmon Survey | · | 1.2 km | MPC · JPL |
| 587363 | 2005 YV_{127} | — | December 28, 2005 | Kitt Peak | Spacewatch | · | 2.3 km | MPC · JPL |
| 587364 | 2005 YA_{130} | — | December 24, 2005 | Kitt Peak | Spacewatch | · | 2.7 km | MPC · JPL |
| 587365 | 2005 YW_{132} | — | December 6, 2005 | Kitt Peak | Spacewatch | · | 1.1 km | MPC · JPL |
| 587366 | 2005 YE_{138} | — | December 26, 2005 | Kitt Peak | Spacewatch | · | 1.9 km | MPC · JPL |
| 587367 | 2005 YS_{139} | — | December 28, 2005 | Mount Lemmon | Mount Lemmon Survey | · | 1.2 km | MPC · JPL |
| 587368 | 2005 YR_{142} | — | December 28, 2005 | Mount Lemmon | Mount Lemmon Survey | · | 3.0 km | MPC · JPL |
| 587369 | 2005 YA_{151} | — | November 26, 2005 | Mount Lemmon | Mount Lemmon Survey | (5) | 900 m | MPC · JPL |
| 587370 | 2005 YC_{156} | — | December 25, 2005 | Mount Lemmon | Mount Lemmon Survey | · | 4.1 km | MPC · JPL |
| 587371 | 2005 YE_{161} | — | December 27, 2005 | Kitt Peak | Spacewatch | · | 2.9 km | MPC · JPL |
| 587372 | 2005 YF_{183} | — | December 27, 2005 | Mount Lemmon | Mount Lemmon Survey | · | 1.5 km | MPC · JPL |
| 587373 | 2005 YD_{184} | — | December 27, 2005 | Kitt Peak | Spacewatch | · | 2.4 km | MPC · JPL |
| 587374 | 2005 YR_{187} | — | December 28, 2005 | Kitt Peak | Spacewatch | VER | 2.6 km | MPC · JPL |
| 587375 | 2005 YF_{189} | — | December 29, 2005 | Kitt Peak | Spacewatch | KOR | 1.3 km | MPC · JPL |
| 587376 | 2005 YO_{193} | — | December 30, 2005 | Kitt Peak | Spacewatch | THM | 2.5 km | MPC · JPL |
| 587377 | 2005 YQ_{197} | — | December 2, 2005 | Mount Lemmon | Mount Lemmon Survey | · | 2.7 km | MPC · JPL |
| 587378 | 2005 YT_{212} | — | December 28, 2005 | Kitt Peak | Spacewatch | EUP | 4.1 km | MPC · JPL |
| 587379 | 2005 YV_{216} | — | December 29, 2005 | Mount Lemmon | Mount Lemmon Survey | · | 550 m | MPC · JPL |
| 587380 | 2005 YT_{222} | — | December 2, 2005 | Kitt Peak | Spacewatch | · | 2.0 km | MPC · JPL |
| 587381 | 2005 YN_{223} | — | December 4, 2005 | Kitt Peak | Spacewatch | · | 1.1 km | MPC · JPL |
| 587382 | 2005 YC_{225} | — | December 25, 2005 | Kitt Peak | Spacewatch | · | 2.6 km | MPC · JPL |
| 587383 | 2005 YE_{225} | — | December 25, 2005 | Kitt Peak | Spacewatch | · | 1.4 km | MPC · JPL |
| 587384 | 2005 YO_{232} | — | November 30, 2005 | Kitt Peak | Spacewatch | · | 1.9 km | MPC · JPL |
| 587385 | 2005 YT_{232} | — | December 28, 2005 | Kitt Peak | Spacewatch | (5) | 1.2 km | MPC · JPL |
| 587386 | 2005 YY_{235} | — | October 6, 2004 | Kitt Peak | Spacewatch | · | 2.9 km | MPC · JPL |
| 587387 | 2005 YN_{238} | — | December 1, 2005 | Kitt Peak | Spacewatch | · | 2.8 km | MPC · JPL |
| 587388 | 2005 YP_{249} | — | December 28, 2005 | Mount Lemmon | Mount Lemmon Survey | · | 2.7 km | MPC · JPL |
| 587389 | 2005 YG_{252} | — | December 29, 2005 | Kitt Peak | Spacewatch | · | 460 m | MPC · JPL |
| 587390 | 2005 YN_{255} | — | December 30, 2005 | Kitt Peak | Spacewatch | · | 3.4 km | MPC · JPL |
| 587391 | 2005 YH_{259} | — | December 24, 2005 | Kitt Peak | Spacewatch | · | 1.5 km | MPC · JPL |
| 587392 | 2005 YO_{259} | — | December 24, 2005 | Kitt Peak | Spacewatch | · | 2.9 km | MPC · JPL |
| 587393 | 2005 YB_{265} | — | December 25, 2005 | Kitt Peak | Spacewatch | · | 1.3 km | MPC · JPL |
| 587394 | 2005 YE_{270} | — | December 27, 2005 | Kitt Peak | Spacewatch | · | 2.9 km | MPC · JPL |
| 587395 | 2005 YG_{277} | — | May 5, 1997 | Kitt Peak | Spacewatch | · | 3.5 km | MPC · JPL |
| 587396 | 2005 YD_{281} | — | December 25, 2005 | Kitt Peak | Spacewatch | · | 3.0 km | MPC · JPL |
| 587397 | 2005 YK_{285} | — | April 29, 2003 | Kitt Peak | Spacewatch | · | 1.5 km | MPC · JPL |
| 587398 | 2005 YX_{291} | — | August 21, 2004 | Siding Spring | SSS | · | 2.9 km | MPC · JPL |
| 587399 | 2005 YT_{293} | — | December 10, 2005 | Kitt Peak | Spacewatch | · | 3.6 km | MPC · JPL |
| 587400 | 2005 YD_{294} | — | December 25, 2005 | Kitt Peak | Spacewatch | KOR | 1.2 km | MPC · JPL |

== 587401–587500 ==
back to top

| Designation | | | Discovery | | | Properties | | Ref |
| Permanent | Provisional | Named after | Date | Site | Discoverer(s) | Category | Diam. | Ref |
|---|---|---|---|---|---|---|---|---|
| 587401 | 2005 YC_{296} | — | December 21, 2005 | Kitt Peak | Spacewatch | · | 1.7 km | MPC · JPL |
| 587402 | 2005 YP_{296} | — | September 27, 2017 | Mount Lemmon | Mount Lemmon Survey | · | 1.2 km | MPC · JPL |
| 587403 | 2005 YE_{297} | — | November 25, 2005 | Kitt Peak | Spacewatch | EOS | 1.9 km | MPC · JPL |
| 587404 | 2005 YE_{298} | — | October 11, 2009 | Mount Lemmon | Mount Lemmon Survey | · | 830 m | MPC · JPL |
| 587405 | 2005 YG_{298} | — | December 28, 2005 | Mount Lemmon | Mount Lemmon Survey | · | 2.6 km | MPC · JPL |
| 587406 | 2005 YH_{298} | — | November 11, 2016 | Mount Lemmon | Mount Lemmon Survey | · | 2.8 km | MPC · JPL |
| 587407 | 2005 YQ_{298} | — | December 24, 2005 | Kitt Peak | Spacewatch | · | 2.5 km | MPC · JPL |
| 587408 | 2005 YM_{299} | — | May 6, 2014 | Haleakala | Pan-STARRS 1 | · | 3.0 km | MPC · JPL |
| 587409 | 2005 YU_{300} | — | December 30, 2005 | Kitt Peak | Spacewatch | · | 1.3 km | MPC · JPL |
| 587410 | 2006 AW_{4} | — | January 2, 2006 | Catalina | CSS | · | 3.2 km | MPC · JPL |
| 587411 | 2006 AH_{12} | — | January 4, 2006 | Kitt Peak | Spacewatch | · | 1.5 km | MPC · JPL |
| 587412 | 2006 AO_{15} | — | January 5, 2006 | Mount Lemmon | Mount Lemmon Survey | · | 2.9 km | MPC · JPL |
| 587413 | 2006 AF_{22} | — | January 5, 2006 | Catalina | CSS | · | 1.1 km | MPC · JPL |
| 587414 | 2006 AZ_{32} | — | December 21, 2005 | Catalina | CSS | RAF | 1.0 km | MPC · JPL |
| 587415 | 2006 AF_{34} | — | December 25, 2005 | Kitt Peak | Spacewatch | (5) | 1.1 km | MPC · JPL |
| 587416 | 2006 AR_{34} | — | January 4, 2006 | Kitt Peak | Spacewatch | EOS | 1.8 km | MPC · JPL |
| 587417 | 2006 AX_{39} | — | January 7, 2006 | Mount Lemmon | Mount Lemmon Survey | · | 1.1 km | MPC · JPL |
| 587418 | 2006 AA_{44} | — | January 4, 2006 | Kitt Peak | Spacewatch | THM | 2.1 km | MPC · JPL |
| 587419 | 2006 AJ_{54} | — | December 28, 2005 | Kitt Peak | Spacewatch | · | 1.4 km | MPC · JPL |
| 587420 | 2006 AV_{55} | — | December 28, 2005 | Kitt Peak | Spacewatch | · | 1.7 km | MPC · JPL |
| 587421 | 2006 AJ_{56} | — | January 7, 2006 | Kitt Peak | Spacewatch | MRX | 820 m | MPC · JPL |
| 587422 | 2006 AO_{59} | — | January 5, 2006 | Kitt Peak | Spacewatch | · | 1.1 km | MPC · JPL |
| 587423 | 2006 AF_{61} | — | January 5, 2006 | Kitt Peak | Spacewatch | · | 1.2 km | MPC · JPL |
| 587424 | 2006 AF_{69} | — | December 7, 2005 | Kitt Peak | Spacewatch | · | 2.4 km | MPC · JPL |
| 587425 | 2006 AM_{72} | — | January 6, 2006 | Kitt Peak | Spacewatch | · | 3.3 km | MPC · JPL |
| 587426 | 2006 AL_{80} | — | January 5, 2006 | Kitt Peak | Spacewatch | · | 1.4 km | MPC · JPL |
| 587427 | 2006 AL_{83} | — | January 6, 2006 | Socorro | LINEAR | (5) | 890 m | MPC · JPL |
| 587428 | 2006 AN_{84} | — | January 6, 2006 | Anderson Mesa | LONEOS | · | 1.1 km | MPC · JPL |
| 587429 | 2006 AU_{108} | — | January 8, 2006 | Kitt Peak | Spacewatch | (5) | 940 m | MPC · JPL |
| 587430 | 2006 AK_{109} | — | September 23, 2008 | Catalina | CSS | · | 1.5 km | MPC · JPL |
| 587431 | 2006 AR_{109} | — | November 17, 1995 | Kitt Peak | Spacewatch | · | 550 m | MPC · JPL |
| 587432 | 2006 AE_{111} | — | November 17, 2009 | Mount Lemmon | Mount Lemmon Survey | JUN | 940 m | MPC · JPL |
| 587433 | 2006 AM_{111} | — | March 17, 2015 | Haleakala | Pan-STARRS 1 | · | 1.3 km | MPC · JPL |
| 587434 | 2006 AU_{112} | — | January 7, 2006 | Mount Lemmon | Mount Lemmon Survey | · | 1.3 km | MPC · JPL |
| 587435 | 2006 AW_{112} | — | September 14, 2013 | Haleakala | Pan-STARRS 1 | · | 1.8 km | MPC · JPL |
| 587436 | 2006 AX_{112} | — | January 7, 2006 | Mount Lemmon | Mount Lemmon Survey | · | 1.7 km | MPC · JPL |
| 587437 | 2006 AH_{114} | — | January 4, 2006 | Kitt Peak | Spacewatch | · | 1.0 km | MPC · JPL |
| 587438 | 2006 AG_{115} | — | January 9, 2006 | Kitt Peak | Spacewatch | · | 2.5 km | MPC · JPL |
| 587439 | 2006 AQ_{115} | — | January 5, 2006 | Kitt Peak | Spacewatch | EOS | 1.8 km | MPC · JPL |
| 587440 | 2006 AT_{116} | — | October 20, 2008 | Mount Lemmon | Mount Lemmon Survey | · | 1.3 km | MPC · JPL |
| 587441 | 2006 BJ_{7} | — | January 21, 2006 | Kitt Peak | Spacewatch | · | 1.2 km | MPC · JPL |
| 587442 | 2006 BH_{12} | — | December 25, 2005 | Mount Lemmon | Mount Lemmon Survey | · | 1.1 km | MPC · JPL |
| 587443 | 2006 BS_{13} | — | December 22, 2005 | Kitt Peak | Spacewatch | AGN | 890 m | MPC · JPL |
| 587444 | 2006 BJ_{15} | — | January 22, 2006 | Mount Lemmon | Mount Lemmon Survey | · | 1.3 km | MPC · JPL |
| 587445 | 2006 BO_{20} | — | January 22, 2006 | Mount Lemmon | Mount Lemmon Survey | · | 1 km | MPC · JPL |
| 587446 | 2006 BN_{41} | — | January 22, 2006 | Mount Lemmon | Mount Lemmon Survey | JUN | 880 m | MPC · JPL |
| 587447 | 2006 BO_{42} | — | January 23, 2006 | Kitt Peak | Spacewatch | · | 1.2 km | MPC · JPL |
| 587448 | 2006 BR_{42} | — | April 28, 2003 | Kitt Peak | Spacewatch | · | 550 m | MPC · JPL |
| 587449 | 2006 BV_{42} | — | January 23, 2006 | Kitt Peak | Spacewatch | · | 1.6 km | MPC · JPL |
| 587450 | 2006 BV_{48} | — | October 15, 2004 | Kitt Peak | Spacewatch | THM | 2.3 km | MPC · JPL |
| 587451 | 2006 BE_{72} | — | January 23, 2006 | Kitt Peak | Spacewatch | · | 1.2 km | MPC · JPL |
| 587452 | 2006 BU_{76} | — | January 7, 2006 | Kitt Peak | Spacewatch | EOS | 1.5 km | MPC · JPL |
| 587453 | 2006 BT_{84} | — | January 25, 2006 | Kitt Peak | Spacewatch | · | 970 m | MPC · JPL |
| 587454 | 2006 BU_{92} | — | January 26, 2006 | Kitt Peak | Spacewatch | · | 1.8 km | MPC · JPL |
| 587455 | 2006 BN_{98} | — | January 28, 2006 | 7300 | W. K. Y. Yeung | · | 3.7 km | MPC · JPL |
| 587456 | 2006 BA_{105} | — | January 25, 2006 | Kitt Peak | Spacewatch | · | 1.4 km | MPC · JPL |
| 587457 | 2006 BR_{108} | — | January 25, 2006 | Kitt Peak | Spacewatch | · | 1.1 km | MPC · JPL |
| 587458 | 2006 BJ_{134} | — | January 27, 2006 | Mount Lemmon | Mount Lemmon Survey | · | 1.3 km | MPC · JPL |
| 587459 | 2006 BS_{140} | — | January 23, 2006 | Kitt Peak | Spacewatch | · | 1.0 km | MPC · JPL |
| 587460 | 2006 BC_{141} | — | January 23, 2006 | Mount Lemmon | Mount Lemmon Survey | · | 1.6 km | MPC · JPL |
| 587461 | 2006 BQ_{154} | — | January 28, 2000 | Kitt Peak | Spacewatch | · | 2.6 km | MPC · JPL |
| 587462 | 2006 BH_{186} | — | January 28, 2006 | Mount Lemmon | Mount Lemmon Survey | · | 2.2 km | MPC · JPL |
| 587463 | 2006 BB_{189} | — | January 28, 2006 | Kitt Peak | Spacewatch | · | 1.7 km | MPC · JPL |
| 587464 | 2006 BQ_{200} | — | January 23, 2006 | Kitt Peak | Spacewatch | (5) | 1.2 km | MPC · JPL |
| 587465 | 2006 BM_{209} | — | January 31, 2006 | Mount Lemmon | Mount Lemmon Survey | · | 850 m | MPC · JPL |
| 587466 | 2006 BV_{209} | — | January 31, 2006 | Mount Lemmon | Mount Lemmon Survey | · | 1.3 km | MPC · JPL |
| 587467 | 2006 BH_{210} | — | January 31, 2006 | Catalina | CSS | HNS | 1.3 km | MPC · JPL |
| 587468 | 2006 BG_{220} | — | January 30, 2006 | Kitt Peak | Spacewatch | · | 1.9 km | MPC · JPL |
| 587469 | 2006 BH_{224} | — | January 30, 2006 | Kitt Peak | Spacewatch | · | 1.5 km | MPC · JPL |
| 587470 | 2006 BG_{232} | — | January 31, 2006 | Kitt Peak | Spacewatch | · | 1.9 km | MPC · JPL |
| 587471 | 2006 BU_{258} | — | October 24, 2005 | Mauna Kea | A. Boattini | (5) | 1.3 km | MPC · JPL |
| 587472 | 2006 BC_{260} | — | November 7, 2005 | Mauna Kea | A. Boattini | · | 710 m | MPC · JPL |
| 587473 | 2006 BX_{260} | — | January 31, 2006 | Kitt Peak | Spacewatch | HYG | 2.9 km | MPC · JPL |
| 587474 | 2006 BR_{274} | — | January 23, 2006 | Kitt Peak | Spacewatch | · | 2.2 km | MPC · JPL |
| 587475 | 2006 BG_{280} | — | January 26, 2006 | Kitt Peak | Spacewatch | · | 2.5 km | MPC · JPL |
| 587476 | 2006 BS_{285} | — | January 22, 2013 | Mount Lemmon | Mount Lemmon Survey | · | 540 m | MPC · JPL |
| 587477 | 2006 BC_{287} | — | November 6, 2013 | Mount Lemmon | Mount Lemmon Survey | HNS | 1.1 km | MPC · JPL |
| 587478 | 2006 BV_{287} | — | January 31, 2006 | Kitt Peak | Spacewatch | (5) | 1.1 km | MPC · JPL |
| 587479 | 2006 BQ_{288} | — | January 7, 2010 | Mount Lemmon | Mount Lemmon Survey | · | 1.4 km | MPC · JPL |
| 587480 | 2006 BS_{290} | — | April 12, 2011 | Mount Lemmon | Mount Lemmon Survey | · | 1.6 km | MPC · JPL |
| 587481 | 2006 BZ_{290} | — | January 26, 2006 | Kitt Peak | Spacewatch | · | 550 m | MPC · JPL |
| 587482 | 2006 BF_{292} | — | December 25, 2005 | Mount Lemmon | Mount Lemmon Survey | · | 1.3 km | MPC · JPL |
| 587483 | 2006 BP_{292} | — | July 25, 2015 | Haleakala | Pan-STARRS 1 | · | 3.2 km | MPC · JPL |
| 587484 | 2006 BZ_{293} | — | January 31, 2006 | Kitt Peak | Spacewatch | · | 1.0 km | MPC · JPL |
| 587485 | 2006 BT_{294} | — | January 21, 2015 | Haleakala | Pan-STARRS 1 | · | 1.1 km | MPC · JPL |
| 587486 | 2006 BY_{294} | — | January 25, 2006 | Kitt Peak | Spacewatch | · | 1.1 km | MPC · JPL |
| 587487 | 2006 BK_{296} | — | November 30, 2005 | Mount Lemmon | Mount Lemmon Survey | · | 570 m | MPC · JPL |
| 587488 | 2006 BT_{299} | — | January 23, 2006 | Kitt Peak | Spacewatch | VER | 2.3 km | MPC · JPL |
| 587489 | 2006 CE_{7} | — | February 1, 2006 | Mount Lemmon | Mount Lemmon Survey | · | 1.2 km | MPC · JPL |
| 587490 | 2006 CP_{8} | — | February 1, 2006 | Mount Lemmon | Mount Lemmon Survey | · | 1.2 km | MPC · JPL |
| 587491 | 2006 CX_{13} | — | January 23, 2006 | Mount Lemmon | Mount Lemmon Survey | · | 2.8 km | MPC · JPL |
| 587492 | 2006 CB_{17} | — | January 8, 2006 | Mount Lemmon | Mount Lemmon Survey | · | 1.7 km | MPC · JPL |
| 587493 | 2006 CH_{17} | — | January 9, 2006 | Kitt Peak | Spacewatch | · | 2.6 km | MPC · JPL |
| 587494 | 2006 CF_{20} | — | January 22, 2006 | Mount Lemmon | Mount Lemmon Survey | · | 1.3 km | MPC · JPL |
| 587495 | 2006 CM_{22} | — | February 1, 2006 | Mount Lemmon | Mount Lemmon Survey | · | 590 m | MPC · JPL |
| 587496 | 2006 CQ_{44} | — | February 7, 2006 | Kitt Peak | Spacewatch | · | 2.5 km | MPC · JPL |
| 587497 | 2006 CC_{46} | — | January 10, 2006 | Mount Lemmon | Mount Lemmon Survey | (5) | 1.4 km | MPC · JPL |
| 587498 | 2006 CA_{51} | — | November 10, 2004 | Kitt Peak | Spacewatch | · | 2.2 km | MPC · JPL |
| 587499 | 2006 CF_{52} | — | January 22, 2006 | Mount Lemmon | Mount Lemmon Survey | · | 400 m | MPC · JPL |
| 587500 | 2006 CW_{52} | — | February 4, 2006 | Kitt Peak | Spacewatch | · | 1.1 km | MPC · JPL |

== 587501–587600 ==
back to top

| Designation | | | Discovery | | | Properties | | Ref |
| Permanent | Provisional | Named after | Date | Site | Discoverer(s) | Category | Diam. | Ref |
|---|---|---|---|---|---|---|---|---|
| 587501 | 2006 CT_{58} | — | February 5, 2006 | Mount Lemmon | Mount Lemmon Survey | · | 3.0 km | MPC · JPL |
| 587502 | 2006 CO_{73} | — | February 2, 2006 | Kitt Peak | Spacewatch | · | 1.3 km | MPC · JPL |
| 587503 | 2006 CN_{81} | — | February 6, 2006 | Mount Lemmon | Mount Lemmon Survey | · | 800 m | MPC · JPL |
| 587504 | 2006 CT_{81} | — | February 2, 2006 | Kitt Peak | Spacewatch | LUT | 4.0 km | MPC · JPL |
| 587505 | 2006 CZ_{81} | — | November 6, 2013 | Haleakala | Pan-STARRS 1 | · | 1.1 km | MPC · JPL |
| 587506 | 2006 CM_{82} | — | January 19, 2012 | Haleakala | Pan-STARRS 1 | · | 3.0 km | MPC · JPL |
| 587507 | 2006 CV_{83} | — | August 3, 2014 | Haleakala | Pan-STARRS 1 | · | 500 m | MPC · JPL |
| 587508 | 2006 CS_{86} | — | September 7, 2008 | Mount Lemmon | Mount Lemmon Survey | · | 1.4 km | MPC · JPL |
| 587509 | 2006 CC_{87} | — | February 18, 2015 | Haleakala | Pan-STARRS 1 | · | 1.1 km | MPC · JPL |
| 587510 | 2006 CE_{87} | — | August 7, 2008 | Kitt Peak | Spacewatch | · | 1.2 km | MPC · JPL |
| 587511 | 2006 CA_{88} | — | June 22, 2015 | Haleakala | Pan-STARRS 1 | · | 3.6 km | MPC · JPL |
| 587512 | 2006 CB_{89} | — | August 24, 2017 | Haleakala | Pan-STARRS 1 | · | 1.4 km | MPC · JPL |
| 587513 | 2006 CH_{89} | — | February 1, 2006 | Kitt Peak | Spacewatch | · | 1.3 km | MPC · JPL |
| 587514 | 2006 DS_{4} | — | February 20, 2006 | Kitt Peak | Spacewatch | NEM | 1.7 km | MPC · JPL |
| 587515 | 2006 DS_{6} | — | January 23, 2006 | Kitt Peak | Spacewatch | · | 2.0 km | MPC · JPL |
| 587516 | 2006 DU_{41} | — | February 23, 2006 | Mount Lemmon | Mount Lemmon Survey | MAR | 930 m | MPC · JPL |
| 587517 | 2006 DB_{52} | — | February 24, 2006 | Palomar | NEAT | · | 2.0 km | MPC · JPL |
| 587518 | 2006 DF_{52} | — | February 24, 2006 | Kitt Peak | Spacewatch | · | 1.1 km | MPC · JPL |
| 587519 | 2006 DY_{55} | — | February 24, 2006 | Mount Lemmon | Mount Lemmon Survey | · | 680 m | MPC · JPL |
| 587520 | 2006 DG_{63} | — | February 23, 2006 | Calvin-Rehoboth | L. A. Molnar | VER | 2.7 km | MPC · JPL |
| 587521 | 2006 DB_{88} | — | December 3, 2005 | Mauna Kea | A. Boattini | · | 1.5 km | MPC · JPL |
| 587522 | 2006 DK_{96} | — | February 24, 2006 | Kitt Peak | Spacewatch | · | 1.7 km | MPC · JPL |
| 587523 | 2006 DH_{99} | — | February 25, 2006 | Kitt Peak | Spacewatch | (5) | 1.4 km | MPC · JPL |
| 587524 | 2006 DL_{99} | — | February 25, 2006 | Kitt Peak | Spacewatch | · | 1.3 km | MPC · JPL |
| 587525 | 2006 DG_{125} | — | January 30, 2006 | Kitt Peak | Spacewatch | · | 1.3 km | MPC · JPL |
| 587526 | 2006 DG_{129} | — | February 1, 2006 | Kitt Peak | Spacewatch | L5 | 9.3 km | MPC · JPL |
| 587527 | 2006 DW_{133} | — | February 25, 2006 | Kitt Peak | Spacewatch | · | 1.6 km | MPC · JPL |
| 587528 | 2006 DG_{139} | — | February 2, 2006 | Mount Lemmon | Mount Lemmon Survey | · | 1.3 km | MPC · JPL |
| 587529 | 2006 DO_{145} | — | October 31, 2005 | Mauna Kea | A. Boattini | EOS | 1.4 km | MPC · JPL |
| 587530 | 2006 DO_{149} | — | February 25, 2006 | Mount Lemmon | Mount Lemmon Survey | · | 790 m | MPC · JPL |
| 587531 | 2006 DM_{151} | — | January 7, 2006 | Mount Lemmon | Mount Lemmon Survey | · | 2.0 km | MPC · JPL |
| 587532 | 2006 DP_{154} | — | February 25, 2006 | Kitt Peak | Spacewatch | AEO | 1.2 km | MPC · JPL |
| 587533 | 2006 DX_{154} | — | February 25, 2006 | Kitt Peak | Spacewatch | · | 1.3 km | MPC · JPL |
| 587534 | 2006 DV_{156} | — | February 27, 2006 | Mount Lemmon | Mount Lemmon Survey | · | 610 m | MPC · JPL |
| 587535 | 2006 DA_{161} | — | February 27, 2006 | Kitt Peak | Spacewatch | · | 690 m | MPC · JPL |
| 587536 | 2006 DP_{165} | — | February 27, 2006 | Kitt Peak | Spacewatch | · | 1.5 km | MPC · JPL |
| 587537 | 2006 DT_{168} | — | February 27, 2006 | Kitt Peak | Spacewatch | · | 1.4 km | MPC · JPL |
| 587538 | 2006 DJ_{177} | — | February 27, 2006 | Mount Lemmon | Mount Lemmon Survey | · | 2.1 km | MPC · JPL |
| 587539 | 2006 DL_{178} | — | February 27, 2006 | Mount Lemmon | Mount Lemmon Survey | · | 1.3 km | MPC · JPL |
| 587540 | 2006 DR_{183} | — | February 27, 2006 | Kitt Peak | Spacewatch | · | 1.5 km | MPC · JPL |
| 587541 | 2006 DO_{191} | — | February 27, 2006 | Kitt Peak | Spacewatch | GEF | 1.1 km | MPC · JPL |
| 587542 | 2006 DT_{197} | — | February 24, 2006 | Palomar | NEAT | · | 700 m | MPC · JPL |
| 587543 | 2006 DA_{201} | — | March 13, 2002 | Kitt Peak | Spacewatch | JUN | 920 m | MPC · JPL |
| 587544 | 2006 DF_{205} | — | February 25, 2006 | Kitt Peak | Spacewatch | · | 1.2 km | MPC · JPL |
| 587545 | 2006 DM_{205} | — | February 4, 2006 | Kitt Peak | Spacewatch | · | 490 m | MPC · JPL |
| 587546 | 2006 DS_{206} | — | February 25, 2006 | Kitt Peak | Spacewatch | · | 490 m | MPC · JPL |
| 587547 | 2006 DV_{219} | — | February 25, 2006 | Mount Lemmon | Mount Lemmon Survey | · | 630 m | MPC · JPL |
| 587548 | 2006 DU_{220} | — | February 27, 2006 | Kitt Peak | Spacewatch | · | 1.4 km | MPC · JPL |
| 587549 | 2006 DK_{222} | — | February 25, 2006 | Mount Lemmon | Mount Lemmon Survey | · | 1.1 km | MPC · JPL |
| 587550 | 2006 DF_{224} | — | February 27, 2006 | Kitt Peak | Spacewatch | · | 2.8 km | MPC · JPL |
| 587551 | 2006 EG_{8} | — | March 2, 2006 | Kitt Peak | Spacewatch | · | 1.5 km | MPC · JPL |
| 587552 | 2006 EZ_{9} | — | March 2, 2006 | Kitt Peak | Spacewatch | · | 1.6 km | MPC · JPL |
| 587553 | 2006 EK_{14} | — | December 3, 2005 | Mauna Kea | A. Boattini | MAS | 760 m | MPC · JPL |
| 587554 | 2006 EL_{14} | — | March 2, 2006 | Kitt Peak | Spacewatch | · | 1.1 km | MPC · JPL |
| 587555 | 2006 EE_{18} | — | March 2, 2006 | Mount Lemmon | Mount Lemmon Survey | HNS | 1.1 km | MPC · JPL |
| 587556 | 2006 ET_{20} | — | January 31, 2006 | Kitt Peak | Spacewatch | · | 700 m | MPC · JPL |
| 587557 | 2006 EV_{23} | — | March 3, 2006 | Kitt Peak | Spacewatch | (883) | 510 m | MPC · JPL |
| 587558 | 2006 EQ_{27} | — | March 3, 2006 | Mount Lemmon | Mount Lemmon Survey | · | 1.3 km | MPC · JPL |
| 587559 | 2006 EK_{30} | — | March 3, 2006 | Kitt Peak | Spacewatch | · | 1.2 km | MPC · JPL |
| 587560 | 2006 EP_{30} | — | March 3, 2006 | Kitt Peak | Spacewatch | AEO | 950 m | MPC · JPL |
| 587561 | 2006 ER_{36} | — | February 4, 2006 | Mount Lemmon | Mount Lemmon Survey | AEO | 960 m | MPC · JPL |
| 587562 | 2006 EG_{44} | — | March 4, 2006 | Kitt Peak | Spacewatch | · | 1.5 km | MPC · JPL |
| 587563 | 2006 EA_{49} | — | March 4, 2006 | Kitt Peak | Spacewatch | · | 1.4 km | MPC · JPL |
| 587564 | 2006 EY_{61} | — | March 5, 2006 | Kitt Peak | Spacewatch | · | 1.5 km | MPC · JPL |
| 587565 | 2006 EK_{67} | — | March 10, 2006 | Lulin | LUSS | JUN | 900 m | MPC · JPL |
| 587566 | 2006 EV_{75} | — | July 25, 2014 | Haleakala | Pan-STARRS 1 | · | 470 m | MPC · JPL |
| 587567 | 2006 EG_{78} | — | July 25, 2014 | Haleakala | Pan-STARRS 1 | · | 590 m | MPC · JPL |
| 587568 | 2006 EW_{81} | — | March 2, 2006 | Kitt Peak | Spacewatch | · | 530 m | MPC · JPL |
| 587569 | 2006 FU_{9} | — | March 6, 2006 | Rehoboth | L. A. Molnar | EUP | 3.5 km | MPC · JPL |
| 587570 | 2006 FB_{23} | — | March 24, 2006 | Mount Lemmon | Mount Lemmon Survey | · | 970 m | MPC · JPL |
| 587571 | 2006 FK_{24} | — | March 24, 2006 | Kitt Peak | Spacewatch | · | 570 m | MPC · JPL |
| 587572 | 2006 FM_{27} | — | March 24, 2006 | Mount Lemmon | Mount Lemmon Survey | · | 650 m | MPC · JPL |
| 587573 | 2006 FO_{56} | — | March 23, 2006 | Kitt Peak | Spacewatch | · | 850 m | MPC · JPL |
| 587574 | 2006 FG_{57} | — | August 27, 2014 | Haleakala | Pan-STARRS 1 | · | 2.6 km | MPC · JPL |
| 587575 | 2006 FH_{58} | — | October 20, 2008 | Mount Lemmon | Mount Lemmon Survey | · | 1.5 km | MPC · JPL |
| 587576 | 2006 FD_{59} | — | March 23, 2006 | Mount Lemmon | Mount Lemmon Survey | HYG | 2.1 km | MPC · JPL |
| 587577 | 2006 FE_{61} | — | March 25, 2006 | Kitt Peak | Spacewatch | · | 1.3 km | MPC · JPL |
| 587578 | 2006 GG_{1} | — | April 1, 2006 | Eskridge | G. Hug | · | 1.7 km | MPC · JPL |
| 587579 | 2006 GQ_{3} | — | April 4, 2006 | Great Shefford | Birtwhistle, P. | · | 720 m | MPC · JPL |
| 587580 | 2006 GB_{14} | — | March 23, 2006 | Kitt Peak | Spacewatch | · | 610 m | MPC · JPL |
| 587581 | 2006 GZ_{29} | — | April 2, 2006 | Mount Lemmon | Mount Lemmon Survey | · | 1.2 km | MPC · JPL |
| 587582 | 2006 GT_{33} | — | March 2, 2006 | Kitt Peak | Spacewatch | · | 970 m | MPC · JPL |
| 587583 | 2006 GM_{51} | — | April 7, 2006 | Catalina | CSS | · | 1.0 km | MPC · JPL |
| 587584 | 2006 GK_{57} | — | September 30, 2017 | Haleakala | Pan-STARRS 1 | · | 1.1 km | MPC · JPL |
| 587585 | 2006 GC_{58} | — | April 2, 2006 | Kitt Peak | Spacewatch | · | 560 m | MPC · JPL |
| 587586 | 2006 HZ_{8} | — | February 25, 2006 | Kitt Peak | Spacewatch | AEO | 1.1 km | MPC · JPL |
| 587587 | 2006 HY_{13} | — | April 9, 2006 | Kitt Peak | Spacewatch | DOR | 1.7 km | MPC · JPL |
| 587588 | 2006 HN_{15} | — | April 20, 2006 | Kitt Peak | Spacewatch | · | 750 m | MPC · JPL |
| 587589 | 2006 HZ_{25} | — | April 20, 2006 | Kitt Peak | Spacewatch | · | 410 m | MPC · JPL |
| 587590 | 2006 HZ_{48} | — | April 25, 2006 | Kitt Peak | Spacewatch | · | 1.5 km | MPC · JPL |
| 587591 | 2006 HC_{52} | — | April 24, 2006 | Mount Nyukasa | A. Nakanishi, F. Futaba | · | 850 m | MPC · JPL |
| 587592 | 2006 HQ_{67} | — | April 7, 2006 | Kitt Peak | Spacewatch | · | 1.1 km | MPC · JPL |
| 587593 | 2006 HP_{77} | — | April 25, 2006 | Kitt Peak | Spacewatch | · | 2.2 km | MPC · JPL |
| 587594 | 2006 HK_{78} | — | April 19, 2006 | Kitt Peak | Spacewatch | NEM | 1.7 km | MPC · JPL |
| 587595 | 2006 HU_{91} | — | April 29, 2006 | Kitt Peak | Spacewatch | PAD | 1.6 km | MPC · JPL |
| 587596 | 2006 HR_{94} | — | March 26, 2006 | Mount Lemmon | Mount Lemmon Survey | · | 500 m | MPC · JPL |
| 587597 | 2006 HP_{99} | — | April 30, 2006 | Kitt Peak | Spacewatch | · | 730 m | MPC · JPL |
| 587598 | 2006 HY_{106} | — | April 30, 2006 | Kitt Peak | Spacewatch | · | 1.1 km | MPC · JPL |
| 587599 | 2006 HU_{110} | — | April 30, 2006 | Catalina | CSS | · | 780 m | MPC · JPL |
| 587600 | 2006 HG_{147} | — | April 27, 2006 | Cerro Tololo | Deep Ecliptic Survey | · | 1.3 km | MPC · JPL |

== 587601–587700 ==
back to top

| Designation | | | Discovery | | | Properties | | Ref |
| Permanent | Provisional | Named after | Date | Site | Discoverer(s) | Category | Diam. | Ref |
|---|---|---|---|---|---|---|---|---|
| 587601 | 2006 HA_{157} | — | April 19, 2006 | Mount Lemmon | Mount Lemmon Survey | · | 1.6 km | MPC · JPL |
| 587602 | 2006 HG_{157} | — | December 25, 2013 | Mount Lemmon | Mount Lemmon Survey | · | 1.4 km | MPC · JPL |
| 587603 | 2006 HS_{157} | — | April 8, 2006 | Kitt Peak | Spacewatch | · | 1.5 km | MPC · JPL |
| 587604 | 2006 HN_{159} | — | April 26, 2006 | Kitt Peak | Spacewatch | · | 650 m | MPC · JPL |
| 587605 | 2006 JD_{8} | — | May 1, 2006 | Kitt Peak | Spacewatch | · | 1.2 km | MPC · JPL |
| 587606 | 2006 JV_{32} | — | May 3, 2006 | Kitt Peak | Spacewatch | · | 1.6 km | MPC · JPL |
| 587607 | 2006 JP_{49} | — | May 1, 2006 | Kitt Peak | Spacewatch | · | 820 m | MPC · JPL |
| 587608 | 2006 JT_{81} | — | May 8, 2006 | Kitt Peak | Spacewatch | · | 690 m | MPC · JPL |
| 587609 | 2006 JA_{83} | — | May 1, 2006 | Kitt Peak | Spacewatch | · | 670 m | MPC · JPL |
| 587610 | 2006 JC_{83} | — | May 1, 2006 | Kitt Peak | Spacewatch | · | 860 m | MPC · JPL |
| 587611 | 2006 JO_{83} | — | May 5, 2006 | Kitt Peak | Spacewatch | · | 880 m | MPC · JPL |
| 587612 | 2006 JF_{85} | — | November 30, 2011 | Kitt Peak | Spacewatch | · | 460 m | MPC · JPL |
| 587613 | 2006 JM_{85} | — | April 26, 2010 | Mount Lemmon | Mount Lemmon Survey | · | 760 m | MPC · JPL |
| 587614 | 2006 JZ_{85} | — | May 1, 2006 | Kitt Peak | Spacewatch | · | 860 m | MPC · JPL |
| 587615 | 2006 JL_{86} | — | January 2, 2009 | Mount Lemmon | Mount Lemmon Survey | · | 910 m | MPC · JPL |
| 587616 | 2006 JN_{86} | — | April 8, 2006 | Kitt Peak | Spacewatch | · | 810 m | MPC · JPL |
| 587617 | 2006 KK_{7} | — | May 19, 2006 | Mount Lemmon | Mount Lemmon Survey | · | 960 m | MPC · JPL |
| 587618 | 2006 KE_{10} | — | May 7, 2006 | Mount Lemmon | Mount Lemmon Survey | · | 880 m | MPC · JPL |
| 587619 | 2006 KZ_{10} | — | October 21, 2003 | Kitt Peak | Spacewatch | · | 1.8 km | MPC · JPL |
| 587620 | 2006 KG_{31} | — | May 5, 2006 | Kitt Peak | Spacewatch | V | 510 m | MPC · JPL |
| 587621 | 2006 KL_{34} | — | May 20, 2006 | Kitt Peak | Spacewatch | MAS | 530 m | MPC · JPL |
| 587622 | 2006 KK_{43} | — | May 20, 2006 | Kitt Peak | Spacewatch | · | 580 m | MPC · JPL |
| 587623 | 2006 KW_{49} | — | May 21, 2006 | Kitt Peak | Spacewatch | MRX | 920 m | MPC · JPL |
| 587624 | 2006 KD_{59} | — | March 2, 2006 | Kitt Peak | Spacewatch | · | 2.1 km | MPC · JPL |
| 587625 | 2006 KU_{60} | — | May 22, 2006 | Kitt Peak | Spacewatch | HNS | 1.3 km | MPC · JPL |
| 587626 | 2006 KY_{60} | — | May 6, 2006 | Mount Lemmon | Mount Lemmon Survey | · | 1.8 km | MPC · JPL |
| 587627 | 2006 KP_{67} | — | May 24, 2006 | Mount Lemmon | Mount Lemmon Survey | V | 530 m | MPC · JPL |
| 587628 | 2006 KF_{69} | — | May 21, 2006 | Siding Spring | SSS | · | 2.2 km | MPC · JPL |
| 587629 | 2006 KH_{72} | — | May 22, 2006 | Kitt Peak | Spacewatch | · | 910 m | MPC · JPL |
| 587630 | 2006 KB_{115} | — | May 25, 2006 | Kitt Peak | Spacewatch | · | 880 m | MPC · JPL |
| 587631 | 2006 KN_{128} | — | May 25, 2006 | Mauna Kea | P. A. Wiegert | · | 1.5 km | MPC · JPL |
| 587632 | 2006 KC_{144} | — | May 21, 2006 | Kitt Peak | Spacewatch | PHO | 920 m | MPC · JPL |
| 587633 | 2006 KE_{148} | — | June 5, 2011 | Mount Lemmon | Mount Lemmon Survey | · | 1.8 km | MPC · JPL |
| 587634 | 2006 KU_{148} | — | October 21, 2012 | Haleakala | Pan-STARRS 1 | · | 1.6 km | MPC · JPL |
| 587635 | 2006 KD_{149} | — | May 24, 2006 | Kitt Peak | Spacewatch | · | 1.5 km | MPC · JPL |
| 587636 | 2006 KS_{152} | — | August 3, 2016 | Haleakala | Pan-STARRS 1 | AGN | 850 m | MPC · JPL |
| 587637 | 2006 KA_{153} | — | April 13, 2013 | Haleakala | Pan-STARRS 1 | · | 600 m | MPC · JPL |
| 587638 | 2006 KZ_{153} | — | October 27, 2017 | Mount Lemmon | Mount Lemmon Survey | · | 1.8 km | MPC · JPL |
| 587639 | 2006 KN_{154} | — | May 25, 2006 | Mount Lemmon | Mount Lemmon Survey | · | 1.6 km | MPC · JPL |
| 587640 | 2006 LO_{9} | — | March 16, 2015 | Kitt Peak | Spacewatch | · | 1.7 km | MPC · JPL |
| 587641 | 2006 MY_{12} | — | June 23, 2006 | Lulin | LUSS | · | 1.9 km | MPC · JPL |
| 587642 | 2006 MM_{13} | — | June 21, 2006 | Lulin | LUSS | MAS | 530 m | MPC · JPL |
| 587643 | 2006 OB_{23} | — | July 21, 2006 | Mount Lemmon | Mount Lemmon Survey | MAS | 510 m | MPC · JPL |
| 587644 | 2006 OP_{28} | — | January 19, 2005 | Kitt Peak | Spacewatch | NYS | 910 m | MPC · JPL |
| 587645 | 2006 OK_{32} | — | July 19, 2006 | Mauna Kea | P. A. Wiegert, D. Subasinghe | L4 | 6.5 km | MPC · JPL |
| 587646 | 2006 OT_{39} | — | November 8, 2007 | Kitt Peak | Spacewatch | KOR | 1.1 km | MPC · JPL |
| 587647 | 2006 PE_{30} | — | August 15, 2006 | Palomar | NEAT | AGN | 1.3 km | MPC · JPL |
| 587648 | 2006 PA_{33} | — | July 28, 2006 | Siding Spring | SSS | PHO | 1.0 km | MPC · JPL |
| 587649 | 2006 PL_{41} | — | May 26, 2006 | Mount Lemmon | Mount Lemmon Survey | · | 640 m | MPC · JPL |
| 587650 | 2006 PC_{44} | — | November 2, 2010 | Mount Lemmon | Mount Lemmon Survey | · | 580 m | MPC · JPL |
| 587651 | 2006 QX_{4} | — | August 19, 2006 | Pla D'Arguines | R. Ferrando, Ferrando, M. | KOR | 1.3 km | MPC · JPL |
| 587652 | 2006 QT_{16} | — | August 17, 2006 | Palomar | NEAT | · | 1.2 km | MPC · JPL |
| 587653 | 2006 QF_{17} | — | August 17, 2006 | Palomar | NEAT | · | 1.2 km | MPC · JPL |
| 587654 | 2006 QM_{17} | — | August 17, 2006 | Palomar | NEAT | NYS | 1.2 km | MPC · JPL |
| 587655 | 2006 QC_{26} | — | August 19, 2006 | Palomar | NEAT | · | 1.2 km | MPC · JPL |
| 587656 | 2006 QG_{29} | — | August 21, 2006 | Palomar | NEAT | NYS | 1.2 km | MPC · JPL |
| 587657 | 2006 QS_{51} | — | May 26, 2006 | Mount Lemmon | Mount Lemmon Survey | · | 980 m | MPC · JPL |
| 587658 | 2006 QR_{64} | — | August 19, 2006 | Kitt Peak | Spacewatch | · | 1.1 km | MPC · JPL |
| 587659 | 2006 QN_{67} | — | August 21, 2006 | Kitt Peak | Spacewatch | THM | 1.8 km | MPC · JPL |
| 587660 | 2006 QS_{73} | — | August 20, 2006 | Kitt Peak | Spacewatch | NYS | 850 m | MPC · JPL |
| 587661 | 2006 QG_{79} | — | August 23, 2006 | San Marcello | San Marcello | KOR | 1.5 km | MPC · JPL |
| 587662 | 2006 QZ_{90} | — | August 17, 2006 | Palomar | NEAT | · | 1.2 km | MPC · JPL |
| 587663 | 2006 QZ_{91} | — | August 17, 2006 | Palomar | NEAT | NYS | 990 m | MPC · JPL |
| 587664 | 2006 QD_{109} | — | August 28, 2006 | Kitt Peak | Spacewatch | · | 1.7 km | MPC · JPL |
| 587665 | 2006 QK_{125} | — | August 24, 2006 | Palomar | NEAT | MAS | 730 m | MPC · JPL |
| 587666 | 2006 QT_{134} | — | August 30, 2006 | Anderson Mesa | LONEOS | · | 930 m | MPC · JPL |
| 587667 | 2006 QS_{153} | — | August 19, 2006 | Kitt Peak | Spacewatch | · | 2.1 km | MPC · JPL |
| 587668 | 2006 QD_{155} | — | August 29, 2006 | Catalina | CSS | · | 2.3 km | MPC · JPL |
| 587669 | 2006 QZ_{161} | — | August 20, 2006 | Kitt Peak | Spacewatch | · | 1.1 km | MPC · JPL |
| 587670 | 2006 QE_{181} | — | August 21, 2006 | Cerro Tololo | Deep Ecliptic Survey | cubewano (cold) | 100 km | MPC · JPL |
| 587671 | 2006 QC_{189} | — | October 17, 2010 | Mount Lemmon | Mount Lemmon Survey | · | 1.2 km | MPC · JPL |
| 587672 | 2006 QG_{189} | — | August 27, 2006 | Kitt Peak | Spacewatch | · | 830 m | MPC · JPL |
| 587673 | 2006 QP_{191} | — | October 19, 2010 | Mount Lemmon | Mount Lemmon Survey | NYS | 990 m | MPC · JPL |
| 587674 | 2006 QS_{191} | — | August 19, 2006 | Kitt Peak | Spacewatch | · | 850 m | MPC · JPL |
| 587675 | 2006 QR_{192} | — | May 12, 2015 | Mount Lemmon | Mount Lemmon Survey | · | 1.7 km | MPC · JPL |
| 587676 | 2006 QC_{203} | — | August 19, 2006 | Kitt Peak | Spacewatch | EUN | 1.1 km | MPC · JPL |
| 587677 | 2006 QJ_{205} | — | August 27, 2006 | Kitt Peak | Spacewatch | · | 1.5 km | MPC · JPL |
| 587678 | 2006 RR_{10} | — | August 27, 2006 | Kitt Peak | Spacewatch | MAS | 650 m | MPC · JPL |
| 587679 | 2006 RP_{24} | — | September 14, 2006 | Kitt Peak | Spacewatch | · | 840 m | MPC · JPL |
| 587680 | 2006 RE_{32} | — | September 15, 2006 | Kitt Peak | Spacewatch | · | 1.9 km | MPC · JPL |
| 587681 | 2006 RS_{60} | — | September 13, 2006 | Palomar | NEAT | · | 1.1 km | MPC · JPL |
| 587682 | 2006 RE_{71} | — | September 15, 2006 | Kitt Peak | Spacewatch | KOR | 1.1 km | MPC · JPL |
| 587683 | 2006 RJ_{106} | — | September 19, 2006 | Kitt Peak | Spacewatch | · | 970 m | MPC · JPL |
| 587684 | 2006 RF_{111} | — | October 21, 2006 | Mount Lemmon | Mount Lemmon Survey | EOS | 1.2 km | MPC · JPL |
| 587685 | 2006 RZ_{113} | — | September 14, 2006 | Mauna Kea | Masiero, J., R. Jedicke | · | 630 m | MPC · JPL |
| 587686 | 2006 RQ_{114} | — | September 25, 2006 | Mount Lemmon | Mount Lemmon Survey | · | 1.4 km | MPC · JPL |
| 587687 | 2006 RS_{117} | — | September 14, 2006 | Mauna Kea | Masiero, J., R. Jedicke | · | 830 m | MPC · JPL |
| 587688 | 2006 RX_{117} | — | September 18, 2006 | Kitt Peak | Spacewatch | · | 1.5 km | MPC · JPL |
| 587689 | 2006 RM_{124} | — | September 15, 2006 | Kitt Peak | Spacewatch | · | 1.4 km | MPC · JPL |
| 587690 | 2006 RO_{126} | — | September 15, 2006 | Kitt Peak | Spacewatch | · | 980 m | MPC · JPL |
| 587691 | 2006 SH_{9} | — | September 18, 2006 | Catalina | CSS | · | 1.2 km | MPC · JPL |
| 587692 | 2006 SK_{32} | — | September 17, 2006 | Kitt Peak | Spacewatch | · | 1.1 km | MPC · JPL |
| 587693 | 2006 SZ_{52} | — | September 19, 2006 | Catalina | CSS | · | 1.1 km | MPC · JPL |
| 587694 | 2006 SG_{59} | — | September 16, 2006 | Catalina | CSS | · | 1.5 km | MPC · JPL |
| 587695 | 2006 SN_{116} | — | September 24, 2006 | Kitt Peak | Spacewatch | · | 1.4 km | MPC · JPL |
| 587696 | 2006 SX_{146} | — | September 19, 2006 | Kitt Peak | Spacewatch | NAE | 1.6 km | MPC · JPL |
| 587697 | 2006 SS_{148} | — | September 19, 2006 | Kitt Peak | Spacewatch | · | 1.1 km | MPC · JPL |
| 587698 | 2006 SX_{157} | — | March 15, 2004 | Kitt Peak | Spacewatch | KOR | 1.2 km | MPC · JPL |
| 587699 | 2006 SL_{160} | — | September 23, 2006 | Kitt Peak | Spacewatch | KOR | 1.3 km | MPC · JPL |
| 587700 | 2006 SU_{173} | — | August 27, 2006 | Kitt Peak | Spacewatch | V | 520 m | MPC · JPL |

== 587701–587800 ==
back to top

| Designation | | | Discovery | | | Properties | | Ref |
| Permanent | Provisional | Named after | Date | Site | Discoverer(s) | Category | Diam. | Ref |
|---|---|---|---|---|---|---|---|---|
| 587701 | 2006 SE_{177} | — | September 25, 2006 | Kitt Peak | Spacewatch | · | 900 m | MPC · JPL |
| 587702 | 2006 ST_{183} | — | September 25, 2006 | Mount Lemmon | Mount Lemmon Survey | · | 460 m | MPC · JPL |
| 587703 | 2006 SE_{186} | — | September 25, 2006 | Kitt Peak | Spacewatch | PHO | 630 m | MPC · JPL |
| 587704 | 2006 SF_{191} | — | September 26, 2006 | Mount Lemmon | Mount Lemmon Survey | MAS | 670 m | MPC · JPL |
| 587705 | 2006 SN_{196} | — | September 26, 2006 | Mount Lemmon | Mount Lemmon Survey | KOR | 1.3 km | MPC · JPL |
| 587706 | 2006 SW_{202} | — | September 17, 2006 | Kitt Peak | Spacewatch | H | 310 m | MPC · JPL |
| 587707 | 2006 SV_{203} | — | September 25, 2006 | Kitt Peak | Spacewatch | · | 1.1 km | MPC · JPL |
| 587708 | 2006 SO_{206} | — | September 25, 2006 | Mount Lemmon | Mount Lemmon Survey | · | 1.4 km | MPC · JPL |
| 587709 | 2006 SZ_{210} | — | September 26, 2006 | Mount Lemmon | Mount Lemmon Survey | · | 2.3 km | MPC · JPL |
| 587710 | 2006 SH_{219} | — | September 19, 2001 | Kitt Peak | Spacewatch | KOR | 1.3 km | MPC · JPL |
| 587711 | 2006 SH_{234} | — | September 17, 2006 | Kitt Peak | Spacewatch | H | 320 m | MPC · JPL |
| 587712 | 2006 SQ_{237} | — | September 19, 2006 | Kitt Peak | Spacewatch | KOR | 1.3 km | MPC · JPL |
| 587713 | 2006 SR_{238} | — | December 4, 2002 | Kitt Peak | Deep Ecliptic Survey | KOR | 1.4 km | MPC · JPL |
| 587714 | 2006 SQ_{250} | — | September 19, 2006 | Kitt Peak | Spacewatch | 3:2 | 3.3 km | MPC · JPL |
| 587715 | 2006 SZ_{258} | — | September 26, 2006 | Kitt Peak | Spacewatch | · | 550 m | MPC · JPL |
| 587716 | 2006 SW_{260} | — | September 17, 2006 | Kitt Peak | Spacewatch | · | 1.6 km | MPC · JPL |
| 587717 | 2006 SE_{265} | — | November 19, 2001 | Anderson Mesa | LONEOS | · | 2.0 km | MPC · JPL |
| 587718 | 2006 SA_{272} | — | September 27, 2006 | Mount Lemmon | Mount Lemmon Survey | · | 2.1 km | MPC · JPL |
| 587719 | 2006 SK_{272} | — | September 27, 2006 | Kitt Peak | Spacewatch | PHO | 870 m | MPC · JPL |
| 587720 | 2006 SA_{277} | — | September 28, 2006 | Kitt Peak | Spacewatch | · | 1.6 km | MPC · JPL |
| 587721 | 2006 SA_{280} | — | March 17, 2005 | Kitt Peak | Spacewatch | V | 570 m | MPC · JPL |
| 587722 | 2006 SK_{301} | — | September 26, 2006 | Mount Lemmon | Mount Lemmon Survey | · | 1.3 km | MPC · JPL |
| 587723 | 2006 SQ_{304} | — | September 27, 2006 | Kitt Peak | Spacewatch | NYS | 810 m | MPC · JPL |
| 587724 | 2006 SG_{307} | — | September 17, 2006 | Kitt Peak | Spacewatch | · | 1.4 km | MPC · JPL |
| 587725 | 2006 SO_{307} | — | September 17, 2006 | Kitt Peak | Spacewatch | · | 960 m | MPC · JPL |
| 587726 | 2006 SP_{320} | — | September 27, 2006 | Kitt Peak | Spacewatch | EOS | 1.8 km | MPC · JPL |
| 587727 | 2006 SV_{326} | — | September 27, 2006 | Kitt Peak | Spacewatch | 3:2 | 3.6 km | MPC · JPL |
| 587728 | 2006 SM_{328} | — | September 27, 2006 | Kitt Peak | Spacewatch | EOS | 1.5 km | MPC · JPL |
| 587729 | 2006 SR_{334} | — | September 28, 2006 | Kitt Peak | Spacewatch | · | 1.1 km | MPC · JPL |
| 587730 | 2006 SC_{358} | — | September 30, 2006 | Mount Lemmon | Mount Lemmon Survey | · | 1.7 km | MPC · JPL |
| 587731 | 2006 SH_{362} | — | May 7, 2005 | Mount Lemmon | Mount Lemmon Survey | · | 1.1 km | MPC · JPL |
| 587732 | 2006 SU_{372} | — | September 30, 2006 | Catalina | CSS | · | 1.2 km | MPC · JPL |
| 587733 | 2006 SK_{375} | — | September 18, 2006 | Kitt Peak | Spacewatch | NYS | 940 m | MPC · JPL |
| 587734 | 2006 SH_{382} | — | August 28, 2006 | Apache Point | SDSS Collaboration | · | 2.2 km | MPC · JPL |
| 587735 | 2006 SX_{385} | — | November 16, 2006 | Catalina | CSS | PHO | 900 m | MPC · JPL |
| 587736 | 2006 SN_{389} | — | September 11, 2006 | Apache Point | SDSS Collaboration | · | 1.8 km | MPC · JPL |
| 587737 | 2006 SR_{395} | — | October 16, 2006 | Mount Lemmon | Mount Lemmon Survey | TRE | 2.0 km | MPC · JPL |
| 587738 | 2006 SY_{422} | — | August 18, 2006 | Kitt Peak | Spacewatch | MAS | 570 m | MPC · JPL |
| 587739 | 2006 SA_{427} | — | April 18, 2012 | Mount Lemmon | Mount Lemmon Survey | MAS | 590 m | MPC · JPL |
| 587740 | 2006 SF_{427} | — | September 16, 2006 | Kitt Peak | Spacewatch | KOR | 1.1 km | MPC · JPL |
| 587741 | 2006 SB_{429} | — | September 28, 2006 | Kitt Peak | Spacewatch | · | 1.1 km | MPC · JPL |
| 587742 | 2006 SB_{433} | — | June 7, 2013 | Mount Lemmon | Mount Lemmon Survey | PHO | 1.1 km | MPC · JPL |
| 587743 | 2006 SE_{433} | — | September 28, 2006 | Kitt Peak | Spacewatch | EOS | 1.7 km | MPC · JPL |
| 587744 | 2006 ST_{436} | — | September 18, 2006 | Kitt Peak | Spacewatch | NYS | 780 m | MPC · JPL |
| 587745 | 2006 SY_{439} | — | March 8, 2013 | Haleakala | Pan-STARRS 1 | · | 1.4 km | MPC · JPL |
| 587746 | 2006 SM_{440} | — | March 26, 2009 | Mount Lemmon | Mount Lemmon Survey | EOS | 1.3 km | MPC · JPL |
| 587747 | 2006 SN_{442} | — | September 17, 2006 | Kitt Peak | Spacewatch | · | 980 m | MPC · JPL |
| 587748 | 2006 SS_{446} | — | September 24, 2006 | Kitt Peak | Spacewatch | EOS | 1.4 km | MPC · JPL |
| 587749 | 2006 SK_{456} | — | September 30, 2006 | Mount Lemmon | Mount Lemmon Survey | · | 1.3 km | MPC · JPL |
| 587750 | 2006 TO_{4} | — | October 2, 2006 | Mount Lemmon | Mount Lemmon Survey | · | 850 m | MPC · JPL |
| 587751 | 2006 TK_{28} | — | March 10, 2005 | Mount Lemmon | Mount Lemmon Survey | · | 740 m | MPC · JPL |
| 587752 | 2006 TE_{67} | — | October 12, 2006 | Palomar | NEAT | · | 2.3 km | MPC · JPL |
| 587753 | 2006 TY_{68} | — | October 4, 2006 | Mount Lemmon | Mount Lemmon Survey | · | 1.1 km | MPC · JPL |
| 587754 | 2006 TQ_{70} | — | October 15, 2006 | Catalina | CSS | · | 1.2 km | MPC · JPL |
| 587755 | 2006 TT_{83} | — | October 13, 2006 | Kitt Peak | Spacewatch | · | 1.6 km | MPC · JPL |
| 587756 | 2006 TZ_{112} | — | September 16, 2006 | Apache Point | SDSS Collaboration | · | 1.9 km | MPC · JPL |
| 587757 | 2006 TH_{118} | — | October 3, 2006 | Apache Point | SDSS Collaboration | · | 1.3 km | MPC · JPL |
| 587758 | 2006 TX_{119} | — | October 11, 2006 | Apache Point | SDSS Collaboration | · | 1.6 km | MPC · JPL |
| 587759 | 2006 TW_{133} | — | March 2, 2009 | Mount Lemmon | Mount Lemmon Survey | · | 2.5 km | MPC · JPL |
| 587760 | 2006 TA_{134} | — | October 2, 2006 | Mount Lemmon | Mount Lemmon Survey | · | 1.5 km | MPC · JPL |
| 587761 | 2006 TB_{134} | — | April 4, 2014 | Mount Lemmon | Mount Lemmon Survey | · | 1.8 km | MPC · JPL |
| 587762 | 2006 TT_{135} | — | October 3, 2006 | Mount Lemmon | Mount Lemmon Survey | · | 1.3 km | MPC · JPL |
| 587763 | 2006 TZ_{137} | — | October 13, 2006 | Kitt Peak | Spacewatch | · | 1.0 km | MPC · JPL |
| 587764 | 2006 TE_{138} | — | October 3, 2006 | Mount Lemmon | Mount Lemmon Survey | NYS | 870 m | MPC · JPL |
| 587765 | 2006 TT_{139} | — | October 3, 2006 | Mount Lemmon | Mount Lemmon Survey | · | 2.1 km | MPC · JPL |
| 587766 | 2006 TZ_{140} | — | October 2, 2006 | Mount Lemmon | Mount Lemmon Survey | · | 1.6 km | MPC · JPL |
| 587767 | 2006 TG_{143} | — | October 2, 2006 | Mount Lemmon | Mount Lemmon Survey | EOS | 1.6 km | MPC · JPL |
| 587768 | 2006 UB_{6} | — | September 26, 2006 | Mount Lemmon | Mount Lemmon Survey | 3:2 | 5.0 km | MPC · JPL |
| 587769 | 2006 UX_{12} | — | October 17, 2006 | Mount Lemmon | Mount Lemmon Survey | KOR | 1.4 km | MPC · JPL |
| 587770 | 2006 UR_{32} | — | October 16, 2006 | Kitt Peak | Spacewatch | · | 2.3 km | MPC · JPL |
| 587771 | 2006 UV_{42} | — | October 16, 2006 | Kitt Peak | Spacewatch | · | 1.7 km | MPC · JPL |
| 587772 | 2006 UQ_{71} | — | January 15, 2004 | Kitt Peak | Spacewatch | · | 1.3 km | MPC · JPL |
| 587773 | 2006 UA_{86} | — | July 27, 2005 | Palomar | NEAT | 3:2 | 5.1 km | MPC · JPL |
| 587774 | 2006 UP_{111} | — | October 19, 2006 | Kitt Peak | Spacewatch | · | 1.3 km | MPC · JPL |
| 587775 | 2006 UW_{113} | — | September 28, 2006 | Kitt Peak | Spacewatch | · | 980 m | MPC · JPL |
| 587776 | 2006 UN_{116} | — | October 19, 2006 | Kitt Peak | Spacewatch | · | 1.2 km | MPC · JPL |
| 587777 | 2006 UF_{120} | — | October 19, 2006 | Kitt Peak | Spacewatch | · | 1.2 km | MPC · JPL |
| 587778 | 2006 UY_{120} | — | October 2, 2006 | Mount Lemmon | Mount Lemmon Survey | MAS | 570 m | MPC · JPL |
| 587779 | 2006 UW_{144} | — | August 27, 2006 | Kitt Peak | Spacewatch | H | 330 m | MPC · JPL |
| 587780 | 2006 UJ_{145} | — | October 20, 2006 | Kitt Peak | Spacewatch | · | 2.0 km | MPC · JPL |
| 587781 | 2006 UT_{150} | — | September 26, 2006 | Kitt Peak | Spacewatch | · | 2.7 km | MPC · JPL |
| 587782 | 2006 UZ_{159} | — | October 21, 2006 | Mount Lemmon | Mount Lemmon Survey | · | 1.6 km | MPC · JPL |
| 587783 | 2006 UE_{160} | — | September 27, 2006 | Kitt Peak | Spacewatch | · | 1.3 km | MPC · JPL |
| 587784 | 2006 UO_{209} | — | October 23, 2006 | Palomar | NEAT | · | 2.5 km | MPC · JPL |
| 587785 | 2006 UR_{226} | — | October 2, 2006 | Mount Lemmon | Mount Lemmon Survey | NYS | 940 m | MPC · JPL |
| 587786 | 2006 UY_{235} | — | September 25, 2006 | Kitt Peak | Spacewatch | · | 1.7 km | MPC · JPL |
| 587787 | 2006 UW_{271} | — | October 27, 2006 | Kitt Peak | Spacewatch | · | 2.0 km | MPC · JPL |
| 587788 | 2006 UT_{276} | — | October 19, 2006 | Kitt Peak | Spacewatch | · | 1.3 km | MPC · JPL |
| 587789 | 2006 UX_{277} | — | October 28, 2006 | Kitt Peak | Spacewatch | ADE | 1.5 km | MPC · JPL |
| 587790 | 2006 UH_{318} | — | November 12, 2006 | Mount Lemmon | Mount Lemmon Survey | · | 2.2 km | MPC · JPL |
| 587791 | 2006 UL_{322} | — | October 16, 2006 | Mount Lemmon | Mount Lemmon Survey | · | 1.4 km | MPC · JPL |
| 587792 | 2006 UH_{347} | — | October 26, 2006 | Mauna Kea | P. A. Wiegert | · | 1.8 km | MPC · JPL |
| 587793 | 2006 UZ_{355} | — | October 26, 2006 | Mauna Kea | P. A. Wiegert | · | 1.6 km | MPC · JPL |
| 587794 | 2006 US_{362} | — | October 21, 2006 | Kitt Peak | Spacewatch | · | 720 m | MPC · JPL |
| 587795 | 2006 UR_{372} | — | October 21, 2006 | Kitt Peak | Spacewatch | · | 1.1 km | MPC · JPL |
| 587796 | 2006 US_{373} | — | October 1, 2006 | Kitt Peak | Spacewatch | · | 1.3 km | MPC · JPL |
| 587797 | 2006 UK_{374} | — | May 7, 2014 | Haleakala | Pan-STARRS 1 | · | 2.3 km | MPC · JPL |
| 587798 | 2006 UL_{374} | — | October 16, 2006 | Kitt Peak | Spacewatch | · | 650 m | MPC · JPL |
| 587799 | 2006 UQ_{379} | — | September 4, 2011 | Haleakala | Pan-STARRS 1 | · | 1.4 km | MPC · JPL |
| 587800 | 2006 UR_{379} | — | October 2, 2006 | Mount Lemmon | Mount Lemmon Survey | · | 1.6 km | MPC · JPL |

== 587801–587900 ==
back to top

| Designation | | | Discovery | | | Properties | | Ref |
| Permanent | Provisional | Named after | Date | Site | Discoverer(s) | Category | Diam. | Ref |
|---|---|---|---|---|---|---|---|---|
| 587801 | 2006 UU_{381} | — | October 22, 2006 | Kitt Peak | Spacewatch | · | 1.3 km | MPC · JPL |
| 587802 | 2006 UB_{382} | — | October 16, 2006 | Kitt Peak | Spacewatch | · | 1.2 km | MPC · JPL |
| 587803 | 2006 UU_{383} | — | October 22, 2006 | Kitt Peak | Spacewatch | · | 1.5 km | MPC · JPL |
| 587804 | 2006 VG_{29} | — | November 10, 2006 | Kitt Peak | Spacewatch | · | 880 m | MPC · JPL |
| 587805 | 2006 VJ_{45} | — | November 15, 2006 | Vail-Jarnac | Jarnac | · | 1.8 km | MPC · JPL |
| 587806 | 2006 VB_{53} | — | November 11, 2006 | Kitt Peak | Spacewatch | · | 2.3 km | MPC · JPL |
| 587807 | 2006 VO_{64} | — | November 11, 2006 | Kitt Peak | Spacewatch | · | 2.1 km | MPC · JPL |
| 587808 | 2006 VB_{71} | — | November 11, 2006 | Mount Lemmon | Mount Lemmon Survey | · | 2.3 km | MPC · JPL |
| 587809 | 2006 VB_{93} | — | November 15, 2006 | Mount Lemmon | Mount Lemmon Survey | · | 1.2 km | MPC · JPL |
| 587810 | 2006 VZ_{116} | — | November 14, 2006 | Kitt Peak | Spacewatch | · | 1.7 km | MPC · JPL |
| 587811 | 2006 VO_{125} | — | September 28, 2006 | Mount Lemmon | Mount Lemmon Survey | · | 1.9 km | MPC · JPL |
| 587812 | 2006 VL_{130} | — | November 15, 2006 | Kitt Peak | Spacewatch | · | 730 m | MPC · JPL |
| 587813 | 2006 VC_{135} | — | November 15, 2006 | Kitt Peak | Spacewatch | · | 1.6 km | MPC · JPL |
| 587814 | 2006 VZ_{177} | — | October 11, 2006 | Kitt Peak | Spacewatch | · | 910 m | MPC · JPL |
| 587815 | 2006 VU_{181} | — | November 1, 2006 | Mount Lemmon | Mount Lemmon Survey | · | 1.7 km | MPC · JPL |
| 587816 | 2006 VK_{182} | — | November 11, 2006 | Mount Lemmon | Mount Lemmon Survey | · | 1.6 km | MPC · JPL |
| 587817 | 2006 WS_{4} | — | November 20, 2006 | Kitt Peak | Spacewatch | PHO | 1.6 km | MPC · JPL |
| 587818 | 2006 WT_{10} | — | October 3, 2006 | Mount Lemmon | Mount Lemmon Survey | NYS | 870 m | MPC · JPL |
| 587819 | 2006 WW_{11} | — | November 16, 2006 | Mount Lemmon | Mount Lemmon Survey | · | 2.0 km | MPC · JPL |
| 587820 | 2006 WU_{34} | — | November 16, 2006 | Kitt Peak | Spacewatch | · | 1.1 km | MPC · JPL |
| 587821 | 2006 WW_{34} | — | November 16, 2006 | Kitt Peak | Spacewatch | · | 2.1 km | MPC · JPL |
| 587822 | 2006 WB_{52} | — | November 16, 2006 | Kitt Peak | Spacewatch | · | 2.4 km | MPC · JPL |
| 587823 | 2006 WS_{64} | — | August 5, 2005 | Palomar | NEAT | (16286) | 2.2 km | MPC · JPL |
| 587824 | 2006 WS_{65} | — | November 17, 2006 | Mount Lemmon | Mount Lemmon Survey | · | 2.3 km | MPC · JPL |
| 587825 | 2006 WL_{67} | — | May 31, 2003 | Cerro Tololo | Deep Ecliptic Survey | · | 1.9 km | MPC · JPL |
| 587826 | 2006 WX_{74} | — | November 18, 2006 | Kitt Peak | Spacewatch | T_{j} (2.96) · 3:2 | 4.7 km | MPC · JPL |
| 587827 | 2006 WS_{79} | — | November 18, 2006 | Kitt Peak | Spacewatch | · | 1.9 km | MPC · JPL |
| 587828 | 2006 WQ_{82} | — | November 18, 2006 | Kitt Peak | Spacewatch | · | 1.1 km | MPC · JPL |
| 587829 | 2006 WS_{83} | — | November 18, 2006 | Kitt Peak | Spacewatch | EOS | 1.7 km | MPC · JPL |
| 587830 | 2006 WP_{85} | — | November 18, 2006 | Kitt Peak | Spacewatch | EOS | 1.4 km | MPC · JPL |
| 587831 | 2006 WY_{88} | — | November 18, 2006 | Kitt Peak | Spacewatch | · | 3.8 km | MPC · JPL |
| 587832 | 2006 WF_{95} | — | November 19, 2006 | Kitt Peak | Spacewatch | · | 1.8 km | MPC · JPL |
| 587833 | 2006 WP_{97} | — | November 19, 2006 | Kitt Peak | Spacewatch | EOS | 2.0 km | MPC · JPL |
| 587834 | 2006 WT_{104} | — | November 19, 2006 | Kitt Peak | Spacewatch | · | 1.1 km | MPC · JPL |
| 587835 | 2006 WL_{114} | — | November 20, 2006 | Kitt Peak | Spacewatch | VER | 3.0 km | MPC · JPL |
| 587836 | 2006 WS_{114} | — | November 20, 2006 | Kitt Peak | Spacewatch | SUL | 1.5 km | MPC · JPL |
| 587837 | 2006 WK_{132} | — | November 18, 2006 | Kitt Peak | Spacewatch | · | 870 m | MPC · JPL |
| 587838 | 2006 WW_{134} | — | November 18, 2006 | Mount Lemmon | Mount Lemmon Survey | · | 970 m | MPC · JPL |
| 587839 | 2006 WR_{140} | — | November 20, 2006 | Kitt Peak | Spacewatch | · | 1.1 km | MPC · JPL |
| 587840 | 2006 WE_{153} | — | October 31, 2006 | Mount Lemmon | Mount Lemmon Survey | · | 2.4 km | MPC · JPL |
| 587841 | 2006 WL_{160} | — | November 5, 2005 | Kitt Peak | Spacewatch | · | 2.4 km | MPC · JPL |
| 587842 | 2006 WD_{165} | — | November 23, 2006 | Kitt Peak | Spacewatch | MAS | 640 m | MPC · JPL |
| 587843 | 2006 WJ_{180} | — | November 24, 2006 | Mount Lemmon | Mount Lemmon Survey | · | 1.9 km | MPC · JPL |
| 587844 | 2006 WZ_{182} | — | November 24, 2006 | Kitt Peak | Spacewatch | · | 1.0 km | MPC · JPL |
| 587845 | 2006 WP_{189} | — | November 25, 2006 | Mount Lemmon | Mount Lemmon Survey | EOS | 1.8 km | MPC · JPL |
| 587846 | 2006 WM_{196} | — | November 11, 2006 | Kitt Peak | Spacewatch | NYS | 1.2 km | MPC · JPL |
| 587847 | 2006 WG_{202} | — | November 22, 2006 | Mount Lemmon | Mount Lemmon Survey | T_{j} (2.99) · 3:2 | 4.7 km | MPC · JPL |
| 587848 | 2006 WX_{207} | — | November 23, 2006 | Mount Lemmon | Mount Lemmon Survey | · | 2.8 km | MPC · JPL |
| 587849 | 2006 WZ_{209} | — | November 13, 2006 | Catalina | CSS | · | 1.9 km | MPC · JPL |
| 587850 | 2006 WM_{210} | — | January 20, 2013 | Kitt Peak | Spacewatch | · | 1.7 km | MPC · JPL |
| 587851 | 2006 WE_{211} | — | October 23, 2011 | Kitt Peak | Spacewatch | · | 1.4 km | MPC · JPL |
| 587852 | 2006 WL_{213} | — | October 2, 2006 | Kitt Peak | Spacewatch | · | 1.3 km | MPC · JPL |
| 587853 | 2006 WA_{216} | — | November 6, 2010 | Mount Lemmon | Mount Lemmon Survey | · | 1.1 km | MPC · JPL |
| 587854 | 2006 WD_{217} | — | February 12, 2008 | Mount Lemmon | Mount Lemmon Survey | · | 1.7 km | MPC · JPL |
| 587855 | 2006 WF_{217} | — | November 24, 2006 | Mount Lemmon | Mount Lemmon Survey | · | 1.4 km | MPC · JPL |
| 587856 | 2006 WY_{217} | — | October 23, 2011 | Mount Lemmon | Mount Lemmon Survey | · | 2.0 km | MPC · JPL |
| 587857 | 2006 WH_{218} | — | November 22, 2006 | Kitt Peak | Spacewatch | · | 2.5 km | MPC · JPL |
| 587858 | 2006 WH_{220} | — | November 18, 2006 | Kitt Peak | Spacewatch | · | 2.4 km | MPC · JPL |
| 587859 | 2006 WL_{220} | — | April 5, 2014 | Haleakala | Pan-STARRS 1 | · | 2.1 km | MPC · JPL |
| 587860 | 2006 WE_{221} | — | September 14, 2013 | Haleakala | Pan-STARRS 1 | 3:2 | 4.6 km | MPC · JPL |
| 587861 | 2006 WS_{221} | — | November 24, 2006 | Mount Lemmon | Mount Lemmon Survey | (5) | 1.0 km | MPC · JPL |
| 587862 | 2006 WX_{222} | — | February 8, 2008 | Kitt Peak | Spacewatch | · | 1.7 km | MPC · JPL |
| 587863 | 2006 WA_{225} | — | September 28, 2011 | Mount Lemmon | Mount Lemmon Survey | · | 2.2 km | MPC · JPL |
| 587864 | 2006 WH_{228} | — | October 30, 2017 | Haleakala | Pan-STARRS 1 | · | 1.9 km | MPC · JPL |
| 587865 | 2006 WZ_{230} | — | November 16, 2006 | Kitt Peak | Spacewatch | · | 610 m | MPC · JPL |
| 587866 | 2006 WA_{232} | — | November 18, 2006 | Kitt Peak | Spacewatch | · | 2.4 km | MPC · JPL |
| 587867 | 2006 XL_{11} | — | December 10, 2006 | Kitt Peak | Spacewatch | · | 1.9 km | MPC · JPL |
| 587868 | 2006 XP_{11} | — | October 23, 2006 | Kitt Peak | Spacewatch | · | 1.7 km | MPC · JPL |
| 587869 | 2006 XH_{30} | — | December 13, 2006 | Mount Lemmon | Mount Lemmon Survey | · | 1.9 km | MPC · JPL |
| 587870 | 2006 XB_{31} | — | December 12, 2006 | Marly | P. Kocher | · | 1.1 km | MPC · JPL |
| 587871 | 2006 XR_{39} | — | December 12, 2006 | Kitt Peak | Spacewatch | · | 970 m | MPC · JPL |
| 587872 | 2006 XP_{65} | — | December 13, 2006 | Socorro | LINEAR | · | 730 m | MPC · JPL |
| 587873 | 2006 XF_{75} | — | November 3, 2011 | Kitt Peak | Spacewatch | · | 2.2 km | MPC · JPL |
| 587874 | 2006 XH_{75} | — | July 25, 2015 | Haleakala | Pan-STARRS 1 | · | 1.8 km | MPC · JPL |
| 587875 | 2006 XA_{77} | — | November 24, 2011 | Haleakala | Pan-STARRS 1 | · | 2.1 km | MPC · JPL |
| 587876 | 2006 XN_{78} | — | January 10, 2013 | Haleakala | Pan-STARRS 1 | · | 1.9 km | MPC · JPL |
| 587877 | 2006 XT_{80} | — | May 14, 2005 | Kitt Peak | Spacewatch | · | 1.1 km | MPC · JPL |
| 587878 | 2006 XR_{81} | — | December 13, 2006 | Kitt Peak | Spacewatch | · | 2.5 km | MPC · JPL |
| 587879 | 2006 XG_{82} | — | December 13, 2006 | Kitt Peak | Spacewatch | · | 1.8 km | MPC · JPL |
| 587880 | 2006 YK_{11} | — | November 16, 2006 | Mount Lemmon | Mount Lemmon Survey | EOS | 1.4 km | MPC · JPL |
| 587881 | 2006 YJ_{21} | — | December 21, 2006 | Kitt Peak | Spacewatch | EOS | 1.9 km | MPC · JPL |
| 587882 | 2006 YU_{21} | — | October 7, 2005 | Kitt Peak | Spacewatch | · | 2.6 km | MPC · JPL |
| 587883 | 2006 YF_{25} | — | December 14, 2006 | Kitt Peak | Spacewatch | · | 1.3 km | MPC · JPL |
| 587884 | 2006 YA_{29} | — | December 21, 2006 | Kitt Peak | Spacewatch | · | 2.3 km | MPC · JPL |
| 587885 | 2006 YO_{29} | — | December 21, 2006 | Kitt Peak | Spacewatch | · | 2.5 km | MPC · JPL |
| 587886 | 2006 YN_{33} | — | December 21, 2006 | Kitt Peak | Spacewatch | · | 2.7 km | MPC · JPL |
| 587887 | 2006 YP_{37} | — | December 21, 2006 | Kitt Peak | Spacewatch | · | 2.4 km | MPC · JPL |
| 587888 | 2006 YK_{39} | — | November 22, 2006 | Mount Lemmon | Mount Lemmon Survey | · | 1.2 km | MPC · JPL |
| 587889 | 2006 YM_{45} | — | November 17, 2006 | Mount Lemmon | Mount Lemmon Survey | · | 1.7 km | MPC · JPL |
| 587890 | 2006 YU_{45} | — | December 21, 2006 | Mount Lemmon | Mount Lemmon Survey | · | 2.0 km | MPC · JPL |
| 587891 | 2006 YH_{58} | — | November 25, 2006 | Mount Lemmon | Mount Lemmon Survey | · | 2.3 km | MPC · JPL |
| 587892 | 2006 YT_{60} | — | June 27, 2015 | Haleakala | Pan-STARRS 1 | · | 1.5 km | MPC · JPL |
| 587893 | 2006 YK_{62} | — | January 3, 2012 | Mount Lemmon | Mount Lemmon Survey | · | 1.8 km | MPC · JPL |
| 587894 | 2006 YC_{64} | — | September 26, 2006 | Moletai | K. Černis, Zdanavicius, J. | EOS | 1.9 km | MPC · JPL |
| 587895 | 2006 YT_{64} | — | November 20, 2007 | Mount Lemmon | Mount Lemmon Survey | · | 2.1 km | MPC · JPL |
| 587896 | 2006 YD_{65} | — | March 25, 2014 | Mount Lemmon | Mount Lemmon Survey | · | 2.3 km | MPC · JPL |
| 587897 | 2006 YQ_{65} | — | May 8, 2014 | Haleakala | Pan-STARRS 1 | KOR | 1.1 km | MPC · JPL |
| 587898 | 2006 YZ_{65} | — | October 26, 2011 | Haleakala | Pan-STARRS 1 | · | 1.5 km | MPC · JPL |
| 587899 | 2007 AH_{6} | — | December 17, 2006 | 7300 | W. K. Y. Yeung | · | 2.1 km | MPC · JPL |
| 587900 | 2007 AT_{10} | — | December 17, 2006 | Mount Lemmon | Mount Lemmon Survey | · | 1.3 km | MPC · JPL |

== 587901–588000 ==
back to top

| Designation | | | Discovery | | | Properties | | Ref |
| Permanent | Provisional | Named after | Date | Site | Discoverer(s) | Category | Diam. | Ref |
|---|---|---|---|---|---|---|---|---|
| 587901 | 2007 AM_{11} | — | January 14, 2007 | Altschwendt | W. Ries | · | 2.6 km | MPC · JPL |
| 587902 | 2007 AQ_{35} | — | January 9, 2007 | Kitt Peak | Spacewatch | · | 500 m | MPC · JPL |
| 587903 | 2007 BT_{1} | — | January 10, 2007 | Mount Lemmon | Mount Lemmon Survey | · | 2.2 km | MPC · JPL |
| 587904 | 2007 BC_{10} | — | January 17, 2007 | Kitt Peak | Spacewatch | · | 2.5 km | MPC · JPL |
| 587905 | 2007 BO_{41} | — | January 24, 2007 | Mount Lemmon | Mount Lemmon Survey | · | 1.1 km | MPC · JPL |
| 587906 | 2007 BW_{50} | — | September 29, 2005 | Kitt Peak | Spacewatch | · | 2.0 km | MPC · JPL |
| 587907 | 2007 BM_{66} | — | January 27, 2007 | Mount Lemmon | Mount Lemmon Survey | · | 2.6 km | MPC · JPL |
| 587908 | 2007 BY_{80} | — | August 31, 2005 | Palomar | NEAT | EOS | 2.1 km | MPC · JPL |
| 587909 | 2007 BC_{87} | — | January 17, 2007 | Kitt Peak | Spacewatch | · | 1.2 km | MPC · JPL |
| 587910 | 2007 BS_{90} | — | January 19, 2007 | Mauna Kea | P. A. Wiegert | EOS | 1.5 km | MPC · JPL |
| 587911 | 2007 BM_{91} | — | March 9, 2007 | Mount Lemmon | Mount Lemmon Survey | · | 2.7 km | MPC · JPL |
| 587912 | 2007 BK_{93} | — | January 27, 2007 | Kitt Peak | Spacewatch | · | 2.7 km | MPC · JPL |
| 587913 | 2007 BG_{98} | — | March 30, 2008 | Kitt Peak | Spacewatch | · | 760 m | MPC · JPL |
| 587914 | 2007 BJ_{98} | — | December 27, 2006 | Mount Lemmon | Mount Lemmon Survey | · | 1.1 km | MPC · JPL |
| 587915 | 2007 BR_{100} | — | January 25, 2007 | Kitt Peak | Spacewatch | VER | 2.3 km | MPC · JPL |
| 587916 | 2007 BN_{102} | — | October 26, 2005 | Kitt Peak | Spacewatch | KOR | 1.3 km | MPC · JPL |
| 587917 | 2007 BU_{102} | — | October 1, 2005 | Mount Lemmon | Mount Lemmon Survey | · | 1.2 km | MPC · JPL |
| 587918 | 2007 BA_{104} | — | January 17, 2007 | Kitt Peak | Spacewatch | · | 1.1 km | MPC · JPL |
| 587919 | 2007 BL_{104} | — | December 24, 2011 | Mount Lemmon | Mount Lemmon Survey | EOS | 1.7 km | MPC · JPL |
| 587920 | 2007 BO_{104} | — | January 28, 2007 | Mount Lemmon | Mount Lemmon Survey | · | 2.2 km | MPC · JPL |
| 587921 | 2007 BQ_{104} | — | January 24, 2007 | Mount Lemmon | Mount Lemmon Survey | HYG | 2.2 km | MPC · JPL |
| 587922 | 2007 BA_{109} | — | January 26, 2007 | Kitt Peak | Spacewatch | · | 2.4 km | MPC · JPL |
| 587923 | 2007 BQ_{111} | — | April 18, 2013 | Mount Lemmon | Mount Lemmon Survey | · | 2.9 km | MPC · JPL |
| 587924 | 2007 BU_{111} | — | January 28, 2007 | Kitt Peak | Spacewatch | · | 2.5 km | MPC · JPL |
| 587925 | 2007 BK_{112} | — | January 2, 2012 | Kitt Peak | Spacewatch | EOS | 1.5 km | MPC · JPL |
| 587926 | 2007 BS_{112} | — | June 24, 2014 | Mount Lemmon | Mount Lemmon Survey | EOS | 1.5 km | MPC · JPL |
| 587927 | 2007 BE_{114} | — | January 27, 2007 | Kitt Peak | Spacewatch | · | 2.4 km | MPC · JPL |
| 587928 | 2007 BQ_{114} | — | January 17, 2007 | Kitt Peak | Spacewatch | THM | 1.7 km | MPC · JPL |
| 587929 | 2007 BE_{116} | — | January 17, 2007 | Kitt Peak | Spacewatch | EOS | 1.5 km | MPC · JPL |
| 587930 | 2007 BC_{119} | — | January 27, 2007 | Kitt Peak | Spacewatch | · | 2.0 km | MPC · JPL |
| 587931 | 2007 CP_{8} | — | February 6, 2007 | Kitt Peak | Spacewatch | · | 2.5 km | MPC · JPL |
| 587932 | 2007 CK_{24} | — | February 8, 2007 | Kitt Peak | Spacewatch | · | 2.5 km | MPC · JPL |
| 587933 | 2007 CE_{28} | — | February 6, 2007 | Kitt Peak | Spacewatch | · | 3.3 km | MPC · JPL |
| 587934 | 2007 CF_{29} | — | January 24, 2007 | Mount Lemmon | Mount Lemmon Survey | · | 1.9 km | MPC · JPL |
| 587935 | 2007 CE_{50} | — | January 17, 2007 | Kitt Peak | Spacewatch | · | 1.2 km | MPC · JPL |
| 587936 | 2007 CU_{55} | — | January 27, 2007 | Mount Lemmon | Mount Lemmon Survey | · | 1.0 km | MPC · JPL |
| 587937 | 2007 CM_{56} | — | February 15, 2007 | Catalina | CSS | · | 3.1 km | MPC · JPL |
| 587938 | 2007 CP_{56} | — | December 21, 2006 | Mount Lemmon | Mount Lemmon Survey | · | 3.4 km | MPC · JPL |
| 587939 | 2007 CB_{66} | — | January 29, 2003 | Apache Point | SDSS Collaboration | · | 850 m | MPC · JPL |
| 587940 | 2007 CB_{70} | — | October 1, 2005 | Mount Lemmon | Mount Lemmon Survey | · | 1.7 km | MPC · JPL |
| 587941 | 2007 CO_{72} | — | February 14, 2007 | Mauna Kea | P. A. Wiegert | · | 970 m | MPC · JPL |
| 587942 | 2007 CY_{81} | — | March 9, 2007 | Mount Lemmon | Mount Lemmon Survey | · | 600 m | MPC · JPL |
| 587943 | 2007 CL_{82} | — | July 25, 2015 | Haleakala | Pan-STARRS 1 | · | 3.1 km | MPC · JPL |
| 587944 | 2007 CO_{82} | — | February 6, 2007 | Mount Lemmon | Mount Lemmon Survey | · | 2.3 km | MPC · JPL |
| 587945 | 2007 CP_{82} | — | February 13, 2007 | Mount Lemmon | Mount Lemmon Survey | · | 2.0 km | MPC · JPL |
| 587946 | 2007 CV_{82} | — | February 6, 2007 | Mount Lemmon | Mount Lemmon Survey | · | 2.1 km | MPC · JPL |
| 587947 | 2007 CZ_{82} | — | February 13, 2007 | Mount Lemmon | Mount Lemmon Survey | VER | 1.9 km | MPC · JPL |
| 587948 | 2007 CS_{83} | — | February 7, 2007 | Kitt Peak | Spacewatch | · | 3.3 km | MPC · JPL |
| 587949 | 2007 DJ_{1} | — | February 16, 2007 | Bergisch Gladbach | W. Bickel | · | 3.1 km | MPC · JPL |
| 587950 | 2007 DM_{5} | — | December 24, 2006 | Kitt Peak | Spacewatch | · | 650 m | MPC · JPL |
| 587951 | 2007 DT_{16} | — | February 17, 2007 | Kitt Peak | Spacewatch | 3:2 | 4.9 km | MPC · JPL |
| 587952 | 2007 DN_{40} | — | February 19, 2007 | Mount Lemmon | Mount Lemmon Survey | · | 2.4 km | MPC · JPL |
| 587953 | 2007 DK_{44} | — | February 17, 2007 | Mount Lemmon | Mount Lemmon Survey | H | 340 m | MPC · JPL |
| 587954 | 2007 DT_{47} | — | January 27, 2007 | Mount Lemmon | Mount Lemmon Survey | · | 870 m | MPC · JPL |
| 587955 | 2007 DP_{55} | — | February 21, 2007 | Kitt Peak | Spacewatch | · | 2.7 km | MPC · JPL |
| 587956 | 2007 DV_{55} | — | February 21, 2007 | Kitt Peak | Spacewatch | · | 2.3 km | MPC · JPL |
| 587957 | 2007 DJ_{58} | — | February 21, 2007 | Kitt Peak | Spacewatch | H | 470 m | MPC · JPL |
| 587958 | 2007 DO_{63} | — | February 21, 2007 | Kitt Peak | Spacewatch | EOS | 1.8 km | MPC · JPL |
| 587959 | 2007 DY_{64} | — | February 21, 2007 | Kitt Peak | Spacewatch | · | 2.9 km | MPC · JPL |
| 587960 | 2007 DG_{65} | — | February 21, 2007 | Kitt Peak | Spacewatch | · | 2.4 km | MPC · JPL |
| 587961 | 2007 DJ_{65} | — | February 21, 2007 | Kitt Peak | Spacewatch | · | 490 m | MPC · JPL |
| 587962 | 2007 DW_{66} | — | February 21, 2007 | Kitt Peak | Spacewatch | · | 710 m | MPC · JPL |
| 587963 | 2007 DH_{72} | — | February 21, 2007 | Kitt Peak | Spacewatch | · | 470 m | MPC · JPL |
| 587964 | 2007 DL_{79} | — | February 23, 2007 | Kitt Peak | Spacewatch | · | 3.3 km | MPC · JPL |
| 587965 | 2007 DD_{107} | — | January 27, 2007 | Kitt Peak | Spacewatch | · | 2.0 km | MPC · JPL |
| 587966 | 2007 DZ_{110} | — | February 23, 2007 | Mount Lemmon | Mount Lemmon Survey | · | 1.0 km | MPC · JPL |
| 587967 | 2007 DW_{111} | — | February 25, 2007 | Kitt Peak | Spacewatch | · | 2.5 km | MPC · JPL |
| 587968 | 2007 DY_{118} | — | February 16, 2007 | Catalina | CSS | · | 2.7 km | MPC · JPL |
| 587969 | 2007 DM_{120} | — | February 23, 2007 | Kitt Peak | Spacewatch | · | 1.2 km | MPC · JPL |
| 587970 | 2007 DB_{121} | — | February 25, 2007 | Mount Lemmon | Mount Lemmon Survey | HYG | 2.6 km | MPC · JPL |
| 587971 | 2007 DJ_{122} | — | January 28, 2007 | Mount Lemmon | Mount Lemmon Survey | · | 2.2 km | MPC · JPL |
| 587972 | 2007 DZ_{122} | — | June 5, 2014 | Haleakala | Pan-STARRS 1 | VER | 2.5 km | MPC · JPL |
| 587973 | 2007 DQ_{123} | — | December 29, 2011 | Mount Lemmon | Mount Lemmon Survey | · | 3.4 km | MPC · JPL |
| 587974 | 2007 DK_{124} | — | February 19, 2002 | Kitt Peak | Spacewatch | · | 2.0 km | MPC · JPL |
| 587975 | 2007 DC_{125} | — | January 15, 2018 | Haleakala | Pan-STARRS 1 | · | 2.0 km | MPC · JPL |
| 587976 | 2007 DJ_{127} | — | February 22, 2007 | Kitt Peak | Spacewatch | · | 2.3 km | MPC · JPL |
| 587977 | 2007 DY_{127} | — | February 25, 2007 | Kitt Peak | Spacewatch | · | 2.3 km | MPC · JPL |
| 587978 | 2007 DL_{129} | — | February 17, 2007 | Kitt Peak | Spacewatch | · | 460 m | MPC · JPL |
| 587979 | 2007 DP_{129} | — | February 17, 2007 | Kitt Peak | Spacewatch | · | 2.5 km | MPC · JPL |
| 587980 | 2007 DX_{129} | — | February 21, 2007 | Mount Lemmon | Mount Lemmon Survey | NYS | 840 m | MPC · JPL |
| 587981 | 2007 EK_{4} | — | February 8, 2007 | Kitt Peak | Spacewatch | H | 350 m | MPC · JPL |
| 587982 | 2007 ES_{6} | — | February 17, 2007 | Kitt Peak | Spacewatch | · | 2.3 km | MPC · JPL |
| 587983 | 2007 EJ_{9} | — | May 24, 2003 | Kitt Peak | Spacewatch | · | 1.4 km | MPC · JPL |
| 587984 | 2007 ER_{22} | — | February 23, 2007 | Mount Lemmon | Mount Lemmon Survey | · | 1.0 km | MPC · JPL |
| 587985 | 2007 EU_{23} | — | March 10, 2007 | Mount Lemmon | Mount Lemmon Survey | · | 2.9 km | MPC · JPL |
| 587986 | 2007 EX_{28} | — | February 23, 2007 | Kitt Peak | Spacewatch | · | 910 m | MPC · JPL |
| 587987 | 2007 EO_{30} | — | March 10, 2007 | Kitt Peak | Spacewatch | · | 2.8 km | MPC · JPL |
| 587988 | 2007 ET_{38} | — | March 11, 2007 | Kitt Peak | Spacewatch | · | 590 m | MPC · JPL |
| 587989 | 2007 EJ_{39} | — | March 10, 2007 | Eskridge | G. Hug | · | 1.4 km | MPC · JPL |
| 587990 | 2007 EE_{50} | — | March 10, 2007 | Mount Lemmon | Mount Lemmon Survey | · | 1.9 km | MPC · JPL |
| 587991 | 2007 EA_{59} | — | January 27, 2007 | Kitt Peak | Spacewatch | · | 2.4 km | MPC · JPL |
| 587992 | 2007 EV_{60} | — | March 10, 2007 | Kitt Peak | Spacewatch | H | 420 m | MPC · JPL |
| 587993 | 2007 EU_{61} | — | February 26, 2007 | Mount Lemmon | Mount Lemmon Survey | · | 2.3 km | MPC · JPL |
| 587994 | 2007 EB_{81} | — | January 28, 2007 | Mount Lemmon | Mount Lemmon Survey | · | 3.4 km | MPC · JPL |
| 587995 | 2007 EV_{83} | — | March 12, 2007 | Mount Lemmon | Mount Lemmon Survey | · | 1.3 km | MPC · JPL |
| 587996 | 2007 EO_{90} | — | March 9, 2007 | Mount Lemmon | Mount Lemmon Survey | THB | 2.1 km | MPC · JPL |
| 587997 | 2007 EK_{94} | — | March 10, 2007 | Mount Lemmon | Mount Lemmon Survey | · | 2.5 km | MPC · JPL |
| 587998 | 2007 EO_{95} | — | March 10, 2007 | Mount Lemmon | Mount Lemmon Survey | · | 1.3 km | MPC · JPL |
| 587999 | 2007 EA_{97} | — | March 10, 2007 | Mount Lemmon | Mount Lemmon Survey | H | 400 m | MPC · JPL |
| 588000 | 2007 EB_{106} | — | September 24, 1992 | Kitt Peak | Spacewatch | HNS | 900 m | MPC · JPL |

back to top

== Meaning of names ==
As minor planet discoveries are confirmed, they are given a permanent number by the IAU's Minor Planet Center (MPC), and the discoverers can then submit names for them, following the IAU's naming conventions. The list below concerns those minor planets in the specified number-range that have received names, and explains the meanings of those names.

Official naming citations of newly named small Solar System bodies are approved and published in a bulletin by IAU's Working Group for Small Bodies Nomenclature (WGSBN). Before May 2021, citations were published in MPC's Minor Planet Circulars for many decades. Recent citations can also be found on the JPL Small-Body Database (SBDB). Until his death in 2016, German astronomer Lutz D. Schmadel compiled these citations into the Dictionary of Minor Planet Names (DMP) and regularly updated the collection.

Based on Paul Herget's The Names of the Minor Planets, Schmadel also researched the unclear origin of numerous asteroids, most of which had been named prior to World War II. This article incorporates text from this source, which is in the public domain: SBDB New namings may only be added to this list below after official publication as the preannouncement of names is condemned. The WGSBN publishes a comprehensive guideline for the naming rules of non-cometary small Solar System bodies.

| Named minor planet | Provisional | This minor planet was named for... | Ref · Catalog |
|---|---|---|---|
| 587299 Holmgren | 2005 WJ_{209} | David E. Holmgren, Canadian astronomer. | IAU · 587299 |
