= List of minor planets: 737001–738000 =

The following is a partial list of minor planets, running from minor-planet number 737001 through 738000, inclusive. The primary data for this and other partial lists is based on JPL's "Small-Body Orbital Elements" and data available from the Minor Planet Center. Critical list information is also provided by the MPC, unless otherwise specified from Lowell Observatory. A detailed description of the table's columns and additional sources are given on the main page including a complete list of every page in this series, and a statistical break-up on the dynamical classification of minor planets.

Also see the summary list of all named bodies in numerical and alphabetical order, and the corresponding naming citations for the number range of this particular list. New namings may only be added to this list after official publication, as the preannouncement of names is condemned by the Working Group for Small Bodies Nomenclature of the International Astronomical Union.

Near-Earth obj.	MBA (inner)	MBA (outer)	Centaur
Mars-crosser	MBA (middle)	Jupiter trojan	Trans-Neptunian obj.
Unclassified

== 737001–737100 ==
Designation			Discovery			Properties		Ref
Permanent	Provisional	Named after	Date	Site	Discoverer(s)	Category	Diam.	Ref
737001	2015 YK_{24}	—	December 31, 2015	Haleakala	Pan-STARRS 1	·	1.6 km	MPC · JPL
737002	2015 YM_{24}	—	November 21, 2014	Haleakala	Pan-STARRS 1	·	2.4 km	MPC · JPL
737003	2015 YA_{26}	—	June 13, 2012	Haleakala	Pan-STARRS 1	EOS	1.6 km	MPC · JPL
737004	2015 YZ_{26}	—	July 15, 2013	Haleakala	Pan-STARRS 1	·	2.3 km	MPC · JPL
737005	2015 YA_{27}	—	July 15, 2013	Haleakala	Pan-STARRS 1	·	2.7 km	MPC · JPL
737006	2015 YB_{27}	—	June 21, 2010	WISE	WISE	·	1.4 km	MPC · JPL
737007	2015 YZ_{29}	—	April 12, 2010	WISE	WISE	·	1.3 km	MPC · JPL
737008	2015 YH_{36}	—	December 18, 2015	Mount Lemmon	Mount Lemmon Survey	L5	7.9 km	MPC · JPL
737009	2016 AY	—	January 7, 2005	Catalina	CSS	·	4.3 km	MPC · JPL
737010	2016 AM_{1}	—	September 16, 2003	Kitt Peak	Spacewatch	·	2.9 km	MPC · JPL
737011	2016 AX_{4}	—	April 15, 2012	Haleakala	Pan-STARRS 1	·	2.2 km	MPC · JPL
737012	2016 AM_{5}	—	January 16, 2010	WISE	WISE	·	2.1 km	MPC · JPL
737013	2016 AB_{6}	—	November 22, 2009	Catalina	CSS	THB	2.8 km	MPC · JPL
737014	2016 AT_{7}	—	March 2, 2010	WISE	WISE	·	3.7 km	MPC · JPL
737015	2016 AG_{10}	—	November 8, 2010	Mount Lemmon	Mount Lemmon Survey	·	2.2 km	MPC · JPL
737016	2016 AO_{10}	—	January 16, 2005	Kitt Peak	Spacewatch	LIX	2.9 km	MPC · JPL
737017	2016 AL_{11}	—	June 18, 2013	Haleakala	Pan-STARRS 1	·	1.5 km	MPC · JPL
737018	2016 AZ_{12}	—	January 3, 2016	Mount Lemmon	Mount Lemmon Survey	HNS	960 m	MPC · JPL
737019	2016 AH_{13}	—	November 19, 1998	Kitt Peak	Spacewatch	·	2.1 km	MPC · JPL
737020	2016 AP_{16}	—	December 3, 2015	Mount Lemmon	Mount Lemmon Survey	·	570 m	MPC · JPL
737021	2016 AX_{17}	—	January 17, 2007	Kitt Peak	Spacewatch	AGN	880 m	MPC · JPL
737022	2016 AZ_{18}	—	February 13, 2010	Kitt Peak	Spacewatch	·	3.2 km	MPC · JPL
737023	2016 AR_{19}	—	May 19, 2012	Mount Lemmon	Mount Lemmon Survey	·	2.5 km	MPC · JPL
737024	2016 AC_{23}	—	November 27, 2009	Kitt Peak	Spacewatch	·	3.3 km	MPC · JPL
737025	2016 AC_{26}	—	May 21, 2006	Kitt Peak	Spacewatch	TIR	3.4 km	MPC · JPL
737026	2016 AL_{26}	—	October 24, 2011	Haleakala	Pan-STARRS 1	·	910 m	MPC · JPL
737027	2016 AM_{29}	—	January 29, 2010	WISE	WISE	·	2.7 km	MPC · JPL
737028 Steinbring	2016 AR_{29}	Steinbring	March 16, 2004	Mauna Kea	D. D. Balam	·	4.2 km	MPC · JPL
737029	2016 AX_{29}	—	June 7, 2013	Haleakala	Pan-STARRS 1	AGN	990 m	MPC · JPL
737030	2016 AA_{30}	—	November 28, 2010	Mount Lemmon	Mount Lemmon Survey	·	1.5 km	MPC · JPL
737031	2016 AQ_{31}	—	November 24, 2009	Mount Lemmon	Mount Lemmon Survey	·	1.9 km	MPC · JPL
737032	2016 AZ_{31}	—	October 13, 1998	Kitt Peak	Spacewatch	·	1.9 km	MPC · JPL
737033	2016 AJ_{33}	—	January 9, 2006	Kitt Peak	Spacewatch	·	1.4 km	MPC · JPL
737034	2016 AU_{34}	—	June 2, 2003	Cerro Tololo	Deep Ecliptic Survey	·	780 m	MPC · JPL
737035	2016 AE_{36}	—	October 12, 2007	Mount Lemmon	Mount Lemmon Survey	·	2.3 km	MPC · JPL
737036	2016 AA_{39}	—	January 30, 2011	Haleakala	Pan-STARRS 1	·	2.3 km	MPC · JPL
737037	2016 AG_{39}	—	November 21, 2009	Catalina	CSS	·	3.8 km	MPC · JPL
737038	2016 AZ_{42}	—	January 3, 2016	Mount Lemmon	Mount Lemmon Survey	EOS	1.6 km	MPC · JPL
737039	2016 AF_{43}	—	September 19, 2014	Haleakala	Pan-STARRS 1	EOS	1.6 km	MPC · JPL
737040	2016 AC_{44}	—	September 11, 2004	Kitt Peak	Spacewatch	KOR	1.1 km	MPC · JPL
737041	2016 AW_{45}	—	July 3, 2011	Mount Lemmon	Mount Lemmon Survey	·	640 m	MPC · JPL
737042	2016 AE_{46}	—	October 27, 2009	Mount Lemmon	Mount Lemmon Survey	EOS	1.4 km	MPC · JPL
737043	2016 AZ_{46}	—	March 12, 2005	Kitt Peak	Deep Ecliptic Survey	·	2.1 km	MPC · JPL
737044	2016 AX_{47}	—	November 7, 2010	Mount Lemmon	Mount Lemmon Survey	·	1.5 km	MPC · JPL
737045	2016 AN_{48}	—	October 17, 2009	Mount Lemmon	Mount Lemmon Survey	·	1.3 km	MPC · JPL
737046	2016 AO_{49}	—	November 14, 2010	Mount Lemmon	Mount Lemmon Survey	·	1.7 km	MPC · JPL
737047	2016 AE_{50}	—	June 29, 2010	WISE	WISE	·	1.7 km	MPC · JPL
737048	2016 AR_{50}	—	November 27, 2009	Mount Lemmon	Mount Lemmon Survey	EOS	1.9 km	MPC · JPL
737049	2016 AE_{54}	—	August 27, 2014	Haleakala	Pan-STARRS 1	·	1.5 km	MPC · JPL
737050	2016 AV_{54}	—	January 4, 2016	Haleakala	Pan-STARRS 1	·	2.1 km	MPC · JPL
737051	2016 AG_{55}	—	September 26, 2003	Apache Point	SDSS Collaboration	·	2.1 km	MPC · JPL
737052	2016 AO_{55}	—	July 13, 2013	Mount Lemmon	Mount Lemmon Survey	EOS	1.6 km	MPC · JPL
737053	2016 AB_{56}	—	January 4, 2016	Haleakala	Pan-STARRS 1	·	1.2 km	MPC · JPL
737054	2016 AD_{56}	—	March 6, 2010	WISE	WISE	·	4.7 km	MPC · JPL
737055	2016 AE_{57}	—	February 16, 2010	WISE	WISE	·	3.6 km	MPC · JPL
737056	2016 AJ_{59}	—	January 4, 2016	Haleakala	Pan-STARRS 1	·	1.5 km	MPC · JPL
737057	2016 AW_{60}	—	February 4, 2005	Kitt Peak	Spacewatch	L5	7.2 km	MPC · JPL
737058	2016 AM_{61}	—	May 21, 2012	Haleakala	Pan-STARRS 1	·	1.9 km	MPC · JPL
737059	2016 AO_{61}	—	March 29, 2012	Haleakala	Pan-STARRS 1	·	1.8 km	MPC · JPL
737060	2016 AX_{62}	—	November 9, 2009	Mount Lemmon	Mount Lemmon Survey	VER	2.3 km	MPC · JPL
737061	2016 AC_{68}	—	January 16, 2010	WISE	WISE	·	2.8 km	MPC · JPL
737062	2016 AF_{71}	—	October 30, 2009	Mount Lemmon	Mount Lemmon Survey	·	2.6 km	MPC · JPL
737063	2016 AW_{72}	—	July 26, 2008	Siding Spring	SSS	·	3.1 km	MPC · JPL
737064	2016 AW_{73}	—	March 30, 2011	Haleakala	Pan-STARRS 1	·	1.9 km	MPC · JPL
737065	2016 AE_{75}	—	December 19, 2009	Mount Lemmon	Mount Lemmon Survey	·	4.2 km	MPC · JPL
737066	2016 AM_{75}	—	March 13, 2010	WISE	WISE	EUP	4.1 km	MPC · JPL
737067	2016 AT_{75}	—	November 10, 2009	Mount Lemmon	Mount Lemmon Survey	·	3.8 km	MPC · JPL
737068	2016 AJ_{78}	—	November 23, 2009	Mount Lemmon	Mount Lemmon Survey	·	1.9 km	MPC · JPL
737069	2016 AP_{78}	—	June 19, 2010	WISE	WISE	·	1.2 km	MPC · JPL
737070	2016 AC_{79}	—	August 9, 2002	Cerro Tololo	Deep Ecliptic Survey	·	2.4 km	MPC · JPL
737071	2016 AW_{79}	—	February 12, 2000	Apache Point	SDSS Collaboration	·	620 m	MPC · JPL
737072	2016 AZ_{79}	—	January 5, 2016	Haleakala	Pan-STARRS 1	·	2.5 km	MPC · JPL
737073	2016 AG_{80}	—	October 27, 2005	Kitt Peak	Spacewatch	·	1.2 km	MPC · JPL
737074	2016 AN_{80}	—	February 3, 2010	WISE	WISE	·	4.9 km	MPC · JPL
737075	2016 AU_{81}	—	December 17, 2009	Kitt Peak	Spacewatch	THM	2.6 km	MPC · JPL
737076	2016 AE_{82}	—	September 18, 2006	Catalina	CSS	·	1.3 km	MPC · JPL
737077	2016 AR_{83}	—	January 5, 2012	Kitt Peak	Spacewatch	·	1.0 km	MPC · JPL
737078	2016 AK_{84}	—	July 14, 2010	WISE	WISE	·	1.7 km	MPC · JPL
737079	2016 AN_{84}	—	May 11, 2010	WISE	WISE	·	1.6 km	MPC · JPL
737080	2016 AZ_{86}	—	June 27, 2014	Haleakala	Pan-STARRS 1	·	1.6 km	MPC · JPL
737081	2016 AG_{87}	—	July 31, 2014	Haleakala	Pan-STARRS 1	·	2.1 km	MPC · JPL
737082	2016 AC_{88}	—	February 4, 2010	WISE	WISE	·	5.0 km	MPC · JPL
737083	2016 AQ_{89}	—	January 27, 2010	WISE	WISE	·	2.4 km	MPC · JPL
737084	2016 AX_{90}	—	April 30, 2010	WISE	WISE	·	1.4 km	MPC · JPL
737085	2016 AR_{91}	—	October 11, 2015	Mount Lemmon	Mount Lemmon Survey	EUN	1.2 km	MPC · JPL
737086	2016 AU_{92}	—	November 2, 2006	Mount Lemmon	Mount Lemmon Survey	·	1.5 km	MPC · JPL
737087	2016 AO_{94}	—	February 9, 2010	WISE	WISE	·	3.4 km	MPC · JPL
737088	2016 AB_{95}	—	January 7, 2016	Haleakala	Pan-STARRS 1	·	2.3 km	MPC · JPL
737089	2016 AJ_{95}	—	January 31, 2008	Mount Lemmon	Mount Lemmon Survey	3:2	3.2 km	MPC · JPL
737090	2016 AR_{97}	—	March 6, 2011	Mount Lemmon	Mount Lemmon Survey	·	2.1 km	MPC · JPL
737091	2016 AU_{98}	—	October 25, 2011	Haleakala	Pan-STARRS 1	·	850 m	MPC · JPL
737092	2016 AE_{99}	—	July 14, 2013	Haleakala	Pan-STARRS 1	·	2.3 km	MPC · JPL
737093	2016 AO_{99}	—	October 28, 2014	Haleakala	Pan-STARRS 1	EOS	1.5 km	MPC · JPL
737094	2016 AJ_{101}	—	September 4, 2008	Kitt Peak	Spacewatch	·	2.3 km	MPC · JPL
737095	2016 AW_{105}	—	April 24, 2012	Mount Lemmon	Mount Lemmon Survey	·	2.3 km	MPC · JPL
737096	2016 AH_{106}	—	January 7, 2016	Haleakala	Pan-STARRS 1	·	680 m	MPC · JPL
737097	2016 AG_{107}	—	November 23, 2009	Kitt Peak	Spacewatch	·	2.6 km	MPC · JPL
737098	2016 AC_{108}	—	January 7, 2016	Haleakala	Pan-STARRS 1	·	2.4 km	MPC · JPL
737099	2016 AU_{109}	—	October 23, 2003	Apache Point	SDSS Collaboration	·	1.3 km	MPC · JPL
737100	2016 AR_{112}	—	November 21, 2014	Haleakala	Pan-STARRS 1	·	2.6 km	MPC · JPL

== 737101–737200 ==
back to top

Designation			Discovery			Properties		Ref
Permanent	Provisional	Named after	Date	Site	Discoverer(s)	Category	Diam.	Ref
737101	2016 AF_{113}	—	November 20, 2014	Haleakala	Pan-STARRS 1	·	2.8 km	MPC · JPL
737102	2016 AD_{115}	—	April 9, 2005	Mount Lemmon	Mount Lemmon Survey	·	1.1 km	MPC · JPL
737103	2016 AA_{117}	—	February 13, 2010	Mount Lemmon	Mount Lemmon Survey	·	4.0 km	MPC · JPL
737104	2016 AN_{118}	—	July 15, 2013	Haleakala	Pan-STARRS 1	·	1.6 km	MPC · JPL
737105	2016 AL_{119}	—	June 21, 2012	Mount Lemmon	Mount Lemmon Survey	·	3.6 km	MPC · JPL
737106	2016 AV_{119}	—	March 29, 2012	Mount Lemmon	Mount Lemmon Survey	·	1.3 km	MPC · JPL
737107	2016 AL_{121}	—	March 22, 2010	WISE	WISE	·	2.9 km	MPC · JPL
737108	2016 AQ_{122}	—	March 29, 2008	Catalina	CSS	RAF	1.1 km	MPC · JPL
737109	2016 AV_{123}	—	March 3, 2005	Catalina	CSS	·	4.4 km	MPC · JPL
737110	2016 AP_{124}	—	April 15, 2010	WISE	WISE	·	3.1 km	MPC · JPL
737111	2016 AS_{125}	—	February 12, 2010	WISE	WISE	·	2.0 km	MPC · JPL
737112	2016 AK_{126}	—	August 8, 2010	WISE	WISE	·	2.3 km	MPC · JPL
737113	2016 AQ_{126}	—	May 1, 2010	WISE	WISE	·	3.1 km	MPC · JPL
737114	2016 AW_{129}	—	May 11, 2005	Catalina	CSS	·	4.1 km	MPC · JPL
737115	2016 AN_{130}	—	April 19, 2013	Haleakala	Pan-STARRS 1	EUN	840 m	MPC · JPL
737116	2016 AY_{131}	—	November 16, 2009	Mount Lemmon	Mount Lemmon Survey	·	3.4 km	MPC · JPL
737117	2016 AZ_{135}	—	April 19, 2007	Kitt Peak	Spacewatch	·	1.3 km	MPC · JPL
737118	2016 AO_{137}	—	September 29, 2014	Haleakala	Pan-STARRS 1	EOS	1.6 km	MPC · JPL
737119	2016 AZ_{137}	—	February 6, 2010	WISE	WISE	·	2.5 km	MPC · JPL
737120	2016 AC_{138}	—	November 27, 2009	Kitt Peak	Spacewatch	·	2.8 km	MPC · JPL
737121	2016 AW_{138}	—	March 4, 2010	WISE	WISE	TIR	3.8 km	MPC · JPL
737122	2016 AO_{140}	—	January 9, 2016	Haleakala	Pan-STARRS 1	·	2.0 km	MPC · JPL
737123	2016 AC_{141}	—	December 8, 2009	La Sagra	OAM	·	2.5 km	MPC · JPL
737124	2016 AK_{141}	—	November 15, 2001	Kitt Peak	Spacewatch	·	480 m	MPC · JPL
737125	2016 AL_{141}	—	October 27, 2009	Mount Lemmon	Mount Lemmon Survey	·	2.3 km	MPC · JPL
737126	2016 AO_{141}	—	April 22, 2012	Kitt Peak	Spacewatch	·	2.0 km	MPC · JPL
737127	2016 AB_{142}	—	January 7, 2016	Haleakala	Pan-STARRS 1	·	1.4 km	MPC · JPL
737128	2016 AG_{142}	—	July 16, 2013	Haleakala	Pan-STARRS 1	·	2.1 km	MPC · JPL
737129	2016 AZ_{142}	—	November 18, 2009	Kitt Peak	Spacewatch	·	3.4 km	MPC · JPL
737130	2016 AJ_{146}	—	October 30, 2014	Mount Lemmon	Mount Lemmon Survey	·	2.1 km	MPC · JPL
737131	2016 AL_{148}	—	November 8, 2009	Kitt Peak	Spacewatch	·	2.0 km	MPC · JPL
737132	2016 AL_{149}	—	May 28, 2012	Mount Lemmon	Mount Lemmon Survey	TIR	2.7 km	MPC · JPL
737133	2016 AD_{155}	—	November 20, 2003	Kitt Peak	Spacewatch	·	3.6 km	MPC · JPL
737134	2016 AB_{158}	—	August 8, 2012	Haleakala	Pan-STARRS 1	THB	2.6 km	MPC · JPL
737135	2016 AX_{159}	—	November 25, 2009	Mount Lemmon	Mount Lemmon Survey	·	2.5 km	MPC · JPL
737136	2016 AO_{161}	—	October 18, 2003	Apache Point	SDSS Collaboration	·	4.2 km	MPC · JPL
737137	2016 AD_{162}	—	October 2, 2009	Mount Lemmon	Mount Lemmon Survey	·	1.8 km	MPC · JPL
737138	2016 AJ_{162}	—	April 30, 2008	Catalina	CSS	·	1.3 km	MPC · JPL
737139	2016 AT_{166}	—	March 21, 2010	WISE	WISE	EUP	4.4 km	MPC · JPL
737140	2016 AY_{167}	—	February 21, 2012	Kitt Peak	Spacewatch	·	1.3 km	MPC · JPL
737141	2016 AB_{170}	—	February 5, 2011	Haleakala	Pan-STARRS 1	·	2.3 km	MPC · JPL
737142	2016 AD_{170}	—	January 6, 2010	Kitt Peak	Spacewatch	·	2.8 km	MPC · JPL
737143	2016 AO_{170}	—	September 9, 2008	Mount Lemmon	Mount Lemmon Survey	EOS	3.3 km	MPC · JPL
737144	2016 AU_{170}	—	November 16, 2009	Kitt Peak	Spacewatch	·	2.2 km	MPC · JPL
737145	2016 AY_{170}	—	December 3, 2008	Mount Lemmon	Mount Lemmon Survey	·	3.6 km	MPC · JPL
737146	2016 AD_{171}	—	October 12, 2009	Mount Lemmon	Mount Lemmon Survey	EOS	1.6 km	MPC · JPL
737147	2016 AD_{173}	—	March 18, 2010	WISE	WISE	·	4.4 km	MPC · JPL
737148	2016 AF_{173}	—	June 29, 2014	Mount Lemmon	Mount Lemmon Survey	·	1.5 km	MPC · JPL
737149	2016 AL_{174}	—	December 9, 2015	Haleakala	Pan-STARRS 1	·	2.2 km	MPC · JPL
737150	2016 AU_{176}	—	September 28, 2008	Mount Lemmon	Mount Lemmon Survey	·	2.3 km	MPC · JPL
737151	2016 AF_{177}	—	November 20, 2014	Mount Lemmon	Mount Lemmon Survey	·	2.5 km	MPC · JPL
737152	2016 AU_{179}	—	April 19, 2010	WISE	WISE	·	2.4 km	MPC · JPL
737153	2016 AL_{180}	—	January 15, 2010	Catalina	CSS	·	3.5 km	MPC · JPL
737154	2016 AX_{182}	—	January 6, 2010	Mount Lemmon	Mount Lemmon Survey	·	3.6 km	MPC · JPL
737155	2016 AQ_{183}	—	November 17, 2014	Haleakala	Pan-STARRS 1	·	2.5 km	MPC · JPL
737156	2016 AG_{184}	—	January 11, 2016	Haleakala	Pan-STARRS 1	·	2.1 km	MPC · JPL
737157	2016 AX_{184}	—	October 28, 2006	Catalina	CSS	ADE	3.1 km	MPC · JPL
737158	2016 AJ_{188}	—	December 9, 2015	Haleakala	Pan-STARRS 1	·	1.1 km	MPC · JPL
737159	2016 AG_{190}	—	October 24, 2003	Kitt Peak	Spacewatch	·	3.2 km	MPC · JPL
737160	2016 AD_{191}	—	September 21, 2001	Apache Point	SDSS Collaboration	·	700 m	MPC · JPL
737161	2016 AR_{191}	—	October 5, 2002	Apache Point	SDSS Collaboration	·	1.1 km	MPC · JPL
737162	2016 AG_{192}	—	January 2, 2016	Haleakala	Pan-STARRS 1	·	580 m	MPC · JPL
737163	2016 AT_{200}	—	November 2, 2010	Mount Lemmon	Mount Lemmon Survey	·	1.3 km	MPC · JPL
737164	2016 AW_{203}	—	April 1, 2005	Anderson Mesa	LONEOS	THB	2.5 km	MPC · JPL
737165	2016 AO_{206}	—	January 23, 2010	WISE	WISE	·	3.8 km	MPC · JPL
737166	2016 AU_{206}	—	January 7, 2016	Haleakala	Pan-STARRS 1	·	2.6 km	MPC · JPL
737167	2016 AS_{209}	—	January 8, 2016	Haleakala	Pan-STARRS 1	·	2.8 km	MPC · JPL
737168	2016 AA_{210}	—	January 8, 2016	Haleakala	Pan-STARRS 1	·	2.7 km	MPC · JPL
737169	2016 AD_{210}	—	May 18, 2010	WISE	WISE	·	2.8 km	MPC · JPL
737170	2016 AD_{216}	—	September 26, 2008	Kitt Peak	Spacewatch	VER	2.1 km	MPC · JPL
737171	2016 AE_{216}	—	September 19, 2003	Palomar	NEAT	·	4.1 km	MPC · JPL
737172	2016 AA_{217}	—	January 4, 2016	Haleakala	Pan-STARRS 1	·	2.3 km	MPC · JPL
737173	2016 AB_{217}	—	March 28, 2010	WISE	WISE	·	3.1 km	MPC · JPL
737174	2016 AS_{217}	—	March 4, 2005	Mount Lemmon	Mount Lemmon Survey	THM	2.1 km	MPC · JPL
737175	2016 AV_{217}	—	March 6, 2010	WISE	WISE	·	3.1 km	MPC · JPL
737176	2016 AW_{217}	—	October 10, 2002	Apache Point	SDSS Collaboration	·	3.1 km	MPC · JPL
737177	2016 AQ_{218}	—	July 5, 2014	Haleakala	Pan-STARRS 1	·	2.0 km	MPC · JPL
737178	2016 AM_{219}	—	September 27, 2003	Kitt Peak	Spacewatch	V	670 m	MPC · JPL
737179	2016 AO_{219}	—	May 2, 2006	Mount Lemmon	Mount Lemmon Survey	·	4.5 km	MPC · JPL
737180	2016 AP_{219}	—	January 16, 2011	Mount Lemmon	Mount Lemmon Survey	EOS	1.4 km	MPC · JPL
737181	2016 AS_{219}	—	May 2, 2006	Mount Lemmon	Mount Lemmon Survey	THM	1.7 km	MPC · JPL
737182	2016 AH_{220}	—	September 16, 2006	Catalina	CSS	·	4.8 km	MPC · JPL
737183	2016 AN_{221}	—	December 31, 2015	Mount Lemmon	Mount Lemmon Survey	KOR	1.1 km	MPC · JPL
737184	2016 AN_{223}	—	January 4, 2016	Haleakala	Pan-STARRS 1	·	2.2 km	MPC · JPL
737185	2016 AW_{223}	—	April 22, 2012	Kitt Peak	Spacewatch	·	1.6 km	MPC · JPL
737186	2016 AL_{224}	—	May 10, 2007	Mount Lemmon	Mount Lemmon Survey	·	4.3 km	MPC · JPL
737187	2016 AU_{224}	—	April 1, 2011	Mount Lemmon	Mount Lemmon Survey	·	2.4 km	MPC · JPL
737188	2016 AW_{224}	—	July 30, 2014	Haleakala	Pan-STARRS 1	·	1.5 km	MPC · JPL
737189	2016 AX_{225}	—	August 14, 2001	Haleakala	NEAT	ADE	2.5 km	MPC · JPL
737190	2016 AK_{226}	—	December 18, 2009	Mount Lemmon	Mount Lemmon Survey	EUP	4.2 km	MPC · JPL
737191	2016 AM_{226}	—	January 10, 2008	Mount Lemmon	Mount Lemmon Survey	·	760 m	MPC · JPL
737192	2016 AU_{226}	—	October 17, 2006	Catalina	CSS	KON	2.2 km	MPC · JPL
737193	2016 AE_{228}	—	October 28, 2014	Haleakala	Pan-STARRS 1	·	2.8 km	MPC · JPL
737194	2016 AH_{228}	—	August 15, 2013	Haleakala	Pan-STARRS 1	·	2.1 km	MPC · JPL
737195	2016 AP_{229}	—	January 9, 2016	Haleakala	Pan-STARRS 1	EOS	1.6 km	MPC · JPL
737196	2016 AR_{229}	—	November 17, 2014	Haleakala	Pan-STARRS 1	EOS	1.5 km	MPC · JPL
737197	2016 AS_{229}	—	November 9, 2008	Mount Lemmon	Mount Lemmon Survey	EOS	1.6 km	MPC · JPL
737198	2016 AW_{229}	—	January 12, 2016	Haleakala	Pan-STARRS 1	EOS	1.6 km	MPC · JPL
737199	2016 AZ_{229}	—	January 14, 2016	Haleakala	Pan-STARRS 1	·	2.2 km	MPC · JPL
737200	2016 AB_{230}	—	January 14, 2016	Haleakala	Pan-STARRS 1	·	2.0 km	MPC · JPL

== 737201–737300 ==
back to top

Designation			Discovery			Properties		Ref
Permanent	Provisional	Named after	Date	Site	Discoverer(s)	Category	Diam.	Ref
737201	2016 AC_{230}	—	November 20, 2014	Haleakala	Pan-STARRS 1	VER	2.1 km	MPC · JPL
737202	2016 AE_{230}	—	October 7, 2008	Mount Lemmon	Mount Lemmon Survey	EOS	1.6 km	MPC · JPL
737203	2016 AG_{230}	—	January 14, 2016	Haleakala	Pan-STARRS 1	EOS	1.5 km	MPC · JPL
737204	2016 AJ_{230}	—	September 29, 2008	Mount Lemmon	Mount Lemmon Survey	·	2.5 km	MPC · JPL
737205	2016 AV_{232}	—	January 14, 2016	Haleakala	Pan-STARRS 1	V	490 m	MPC · JPL
737206	2016 AE_{233}	—	October 28, 2014	Haleakala	Pan-STARRS 1	·	2.5 km	MPC · JPL
737207	2016 AF_{233}	—	April 30, 2012	Kitt Peak	Spacewatch	·	2.8 km	MPC · JPL
737208	2016 AO_{233}	—	October 27, 2009	Mount Lemmon	Mount Lemmon Survey	·	2.6 km	MPC · JPL
737209	2016 AS_{233}	—	December 11, 2009	Mount Lemmon	Mount Lemmon Survey	·	1.9 km	MPC · JPL
737210	2016 AZ_{233}	—	December 10, 2010	Mount Lemmon	Mount Lemmon Survey	·	1.8 km	MPC · JPL
737211	2016 AL_{234}	—	January 7, 2016	Haleakala	Pan-STARRS 1	·	1.9 km	MPC · JPL
737212	2016 AQ_{234}	—	May 21, 2012	Mount Lemmon	Mount Lemmon Survey	EOS	1.5 km	MPC · JPL
737213	2016 AA_{235}	—	June 15, 2012	Haleakala	Pan-STARRS 1	·	2.3 km	MPC · JPL
737214	2016 AB_{235}	—	February 11, 2000	Kitt Peak	Spacewatch	EOS	1.6 km	MPC · JPL
737215	2016 AP_{235}	—	January 1, 2016	Haleakala	Pan-STARRS 1	URS	2.2 km	MPC · JPL
737216	2016 AQ_{235}	—	March 7, 2010	WISE	WISE	·	2.8 km	MPC · JPL
737217	2016 AP_{236}	—	October 30, 2014	Mount Lemmon	Mount Lemmon Survey	EOS	1.6 km	MPC · JPL
737218	2016 AZ_{236}	—	February 7, 2011	Mount Lemmon	Mount Lemmon Survey	EOS	1.6 km	MPC · JPL
737219	2016 AP_{237}	—	May 15, 2012	Haleakala	Pan-STARRS 1	EOS	1.5 km	MPC · JPL
737220	2016 AT_{238}	—	January 1, 2016	Haleakala	Pan-STARRS 1	TIR	2.5 km	MPC · JPL
737221	2016 AG_{239}	—	January 25, 2007	Kitt Peak	Spacewatch	·	1.8 km	MPC · JPL
737222	2016 AO_{240}	—	February 12, 2011	Mount Lemmon	Mount Lemmon Survey	·	2.0 km	MPC · JPL
737223	2016 AZ_{241}	—	January 30, 2011	Kitt Peak	Spacewatch	·	1.7 km	MPC · JPL
737224	2016 AE_{242}	—	January 3, 2016	Haleakala	Pan-STARRS 1	KOR	1.1 km	MPC · JPL
737225	2016 AF_{242}	—	August 4, 2013	Haleakala	Pan-STARRS 1	·	2.0 km	MPC · JPL
737226	2016 AX_{242}	—	January 3, 2016	Haleakala	Pan-STARRS 1	·	1.8 km	MPC · JPL
737227	2016 AZ_{242}	—	March 14, 2012	Mount Lemmon	Mount Lemmon Survey	·	1.3 km	MPC · JPL
737228	2016 AT_{243}	—	January 28, 2011	Kitt Peak	Spacewatch	HYG	2.6 km	MPC · JPL
737229	2016 AZ_{245}	—	December 9, 2010	Mount Lemmon	Mount Lemmon Survey	EOS	1.4 km	MPC · JPL
737230	2016 AM_{246}	—	February 26, 2011	Mount Lemmon	Mount Lemmon Survey	·	2.2 km	MPC · JPL
737231	2016 AX_{247}	—	April 28, 2012	Mount Lemmon	Mount Lemmon Survey	·	1.4 km	MPC · JPL
737232	2016 AF_{248}	—	January 4, 2016	Haleakala	Pan-STARRS 1	·	2.0 km	MPC · JPL
737233	2016 AL_{248}	—	January 28, 2011	Kitt Peak	Spacewatch	EOS	1.6 km	MPC · JPL
737234	2016 AZ_{249}	—	April 15, 2012	Haleakala	Pan-STARRS 1	·	2.4 km	MPC · JPL
737235	2016 AC_{250}	—	September 18, 2009	Kitt Peak	Spacewatch	·	1.8 km	MPC · JPL
737236	2016 AH_{251}	—	October 23, 2009	Kitt Peak	Spacewatch	·	1.5 km	MPC · JPL
737237	2016 AW_{252}	—	November 23, 2014	Mount Lemmon	Mount Lemmon Survey	·	2.4 km	MPC · JPL
737238	2016 AQ_{254}	—	December 18, 2015	Mount Lemmon	Mount Lemmon Survey	·	2.3 km	MPC · JPL
737239	2016 AU_{254}	—	February 21, 2012	Kitt Peak	Spacewatch	·	1.6 km	MPC · JPL
737240	2016 AF_{255}	—	January 3, 2011	Mount Lemmon	Mount Lemmon Survey	·	1.7 km	MPC · JPL
737241	2016 AW_{255}	—	January 17, 2005	Kitt Peak	Spacewatch	·	3.1 km	MPC · JPL
737242	2016 AA_{257}	—	January 7, 2016	Haleakala	Pan-STARRS 1	·	1.3 km	MPC · JPL
737243	2016 AM_{257}	—	January 7, 2016	Haleakala	Pan-STARRS 1	·	2.2 km	MPC · JPL
737244	2016 AV_{257}	—	November 21, 2014	Haleakala	Pan-STARRS 1	VER	2.3 km	MPC · JPL
737245	2016 AR_{259}	—	June 21, 2010	Mount Lemmon	Mount Lemmon Survey	V	590 m	MPC · JPL
737246	2016 AJ_{261}	—	April 2, 2011	Kitt Peak	Spacewatch	·	2.4 km	MPC · JPL
737247	2016 AW_{261}	—	January 8, 2016	Haleakala	Pan-STARRS 1	EOS	1.7 km	MPC · JPL
737248	2016 AZ_{261}	—	November 26, 2014	Haleakala	Pan-STARRS 1	·	2.4 km	MPC · JPL
737249	2016 AG_{262}	—	September 1, 2013	Mount Lemmon	Mount Lemmon Survey	·	2.3 km	MPC · JPL
737250	2016 AF_{263}	—	January 8, 2016	Haleakala	Pan-STARRS 1	·	2.6 km	MPC · JPL
737251	2016 AM_{264}	—	January 29, 2011	Kitt Peak	Spacewatch	·	1.7 km	MPC · JPL
737252	2016 AW_{264}	—	November 17, 2014	Haleakala	Pan-STARRS 1	ANF	1.1 km	MPC · JPL
737253	2016 AE_{266}	—	August 27, 2013	Calar Alto	F. Hormuth	·	2.6 km	MPC · JPL
737254	2016 AC_{267}	—	April 4, 2010	WISE	WISE	·	3.5 km	MPC · JPL
737255	2016 AZ_{267}	—	March 11, 2011	Mount Lemmon	Mount Lemmon Survey	·	2.3 km	MPC · JPL
737256	2016 AJ_{268}	—	January 12, 2016	Kitt Peak	Spacewatch	·	1.4 km	MPC · JPL
737257	2016 AK_{268}	—	January 12, 2016	Haleakala	Pan-STARRS 1	·	1.7 km	MPC · JPL
737258	2016 AY_{268}	—	September 2, 2014	Haleakala	Pan-STARRS 1	·	1.5 km	MPC · JPL
737259	2016 AZ_{270}	—	October 30, 2014	Haleakala	Pan-STARRS 1	·	1.6 km	MPC · JPL
737260	2016 AE_{272}	—	March 14, 2011	Kitt Peak	Spacewatch	·	2.1 km	MPC · JPL
737261	2016 AU_{274}	—	August 15, 2013	Haleakala	Pan-STARRS 1	·	2.0 km	MPC · JPL
737262	2016 AA_{275}	—	January 14, 2016	Haleakala	Pan-STARRS 1	·	2.6 km	MPC · JPL
737263	2016 AP_{275}	—	September 1, 2013	Mount Lemmon	Mount Lemmon Survey	·	2.5 km	MPC · JPL
737264	2016 AG_{276}	—	January 14, 2016	Haleakala	Pan-STARRS 1	·	1.3 km	MPC · JPL
737265	2016 AN_{276}	—	January 14, 2016	Haleakala	Pan-STARRS 1	·	1.5 km	MPC · JPL
737266	2016 AL_{278}	—	January 20, 2010	WISE	WISE	·	3.9 km	MPC · JPL
737267	2016 AM_{278}	—	November 9, 2008	Mount Lemmon	Mount Lemmon Survey	·	2.6 km	MPC · JPL
737268	2016 AA_{298}	—	January 12, 2016	Haleakala	Pan-STARRS 1	·	2.3 km	MPC · JPL
737269	2016 AZ_{301}	—	January 11, 2016	Haleakala	Pan-STARRS 1	·	2.4 km	MPC · JPL
737270	2016 AM_{304}	—	January 5, 2016	Haleakala	Pan-STARRS 1	·	2.1 km	MPC · JPL
737271	2016 AS_{305}	—	January 11, 2016	Haleakala	Pan-STARRS 1	·	2.8 km	MPC · JPL
737272	2016 AT_{305}	—	January 5, 2016	Haleakala	Pan-STARRS 1	·	2.1 km	MPC · JPL
737273	2016 AX_{305}	—	January 4, 2016	Haleakala	Pan-STARRS 1	·	2.6 km	MPC · JPL
737274	2016 AE_{306}	—	January 3, 2016	Haleakala	Pan-STARRS 1	VER	2.0 km	MPC · JPL
737275	2016 AC_{311}	—	January 11, 2016	Haleakala	Pan-STARRS 1	L5	7.3 km	MPC · JPL
737276	2016 AK_{321}	—	January 13, 2016	Haleakala	Pan-STARRS 1	L5	6.8 km	MPC · JPL
737277	2016 AO_{329}	—	November 12, 2001	Apache Point	SDSS Collaboration	L5	7.7 km	MPC · JPL
737278	2016 AF_{331}	—	January 2, 2016	Haleakala	Pan-STARRS 1	·	2.2 km	MPC · JPL
737279	2016 AB_{336}	—	January 3, 2016	Haleakala	Pan-STARRS 1	·	2.3 km	MPC · JPL
737280	2016 AM_{343}	—	January 9, 2016	Haleakala	Pan-STARRS 1	L5	6.7 km	MPC · JPL
737281	2016 AP_{343}	—	January 14, 2016	Haleakala	Pan-STARRS 1	·	2.6 km	MPC · JPL
737282	2016 AW_{344}	—	August 10, 2005	Cerro Tololo	Deep Ecliptic Survey	·	520 m	MPC · JPL
737283	2016 AZ_{349}	—	January 4, 2016	Haleakala	Pan-STARRS 1	·	1.4 km	MPC · JPL
737284	2016 AC_{350}	—	January 8, 2016	Haleakala	Pan-STARRS 1	·	2.6 km	MPC · JPL
737285	2016 AJ_{350}	—	January 4, 2016	Haleakala	Pan-STARRS 1	EOS	1.4 km	MPC · JPL
737286	2016 AE_{360}	—	January 3, 2016	Haleakala	Pan-STARRS 1	·	1.8 km	MPC · JPL
737287	2016 AA_{361}	—	January 14, 2016	Haleakala	Pan-STARRS 1	EOS	1.4 km	MPC · JPL
737288	2016 AP_{364}	—	September 30, 2014	Mount Lemmon	Mount Lemmon Survey	WIT	780 m	MPC · JPL
737289	2016 AU_{368}	—	January 7, 2016	Haleakala	Pan-STARRS 1	·	2.3 km	MPC · JPL
737290	2016 AR_{370}	—	January 9, 2016	Haleakala	Pan-STARRS 1	·	1.9 km	MPC · JPL
737291	2016 AG_{371}	—	January 9, 2016	Haleakala	Pan-STARRS 1	·	1.8 km	MPC · JPL
737292	2016 AT_{372}	—	January 7, 2016	ESA OGS	ESA OGS	·	2.4 km	MPC · JPL
737293	2016 AN_{380}	—	January 2, 2016	Mount Lemmon	Mount Lemmon Survey	·	2.2 km	MPC · JPL
737294	2016 AK_{384}	—	January 14, 2016	Haleakala	Pan-STARRS 1	·	1.5 km	MPC · JPL
737295	2016 BD	—	March 19, 2007	Mount Lemmon	Mount Lemmon Survey	L5	10 km	MPC · JPL
737296	2016 BN_{3}	—	January 2, 2016	Mount Lemmon	Mount Lemmon Survey	·	2.7 km	MPC · JPL
737297	2016 BU_{3}	—	December 14, 2004	Kitt Peak	Spacewatch	·	2.8 km	MPC · JPL
737298	2016 BY_{4}	—	March 11, 2010	WISE	WISE	·	4.4 km	MPC · JPL
737299	2016 BF_{6}	—	September 21, 2001	Anderson Mesa	LONEOS	·	820 m	MPC · JPL
737300	2016 BJ_{9}	—	January 6, 2010	Kitt Peak	Spacewatch	EOS	1.9 km	MPC · JPL

== 737301–737400 ==
back to top

Designation			Discovery			Properties		Ref
Permanent	Provisional	Named after	Date	Site	Discoverer(s)	Category	Diam.	Ref
737301	2016 BU_{9}	—	March 12, 2010	Mount Lemmon	Mount Lemmon Survey	·	2.7 km	MPC · JPL
737302	2016 BF_{12}	—	September 26, 2003	Apache Point	SDSS Collaboration	NYS	1.0 km	MPC · JPL
737303	2016 BK_{23}	—	December 18, 2009	Kitt Peak	Spacewatch	·	2.6 km	MPC · JPL
737304	2016 BV_{23}	—	October 1, 2008	Mount Lemmon	Mount Lemmon Survey	·	2.4 km	MPC · JPL
737305	2016 BB_{24}	—	October 18, 2009	Mount Lemmon	Mount Lemmon Survey	·	1.5 km	MPC · JPL
737306	2016 BD_{25}	—	July 14, 2013	Haleakala	Pan-STARRS 1	·	2.6 km	MPC · JPL
737307	2016 BF_{25}	—	July 25, 2014	Haleakala	Pan-STARRS 1	·	510 m	MPC · JPL
737308	2016 BG_{28}	—	September 26, 2003	Apache Point	SDSS Collaboration	·	2.1 km	MPC · JPL
737309	2016 BH_{28}	—	January 1, 2016	Haleakala	Pan-STARRS 1	·	2.2 km	MPC · JPL
737310	2016 BW_{28}	—	September 18, 2014	Haleakala	Pan-STARRS 1	·	1.6 km	MPC · JPL
737311	2016 BX_{28}	—	January 7, 2016	Haleakala	Pan-STARRS 1	ELF	2.6 km	MPC · JPL
737312	2016 BO_{30}	—	September 21, 2008	Kitt Peak	Spacewatch	·	2.5 km	MPC · JPL
737313	2016 BB_{31}	—	January 29, 2016	Mount Lemmon	Mount Lemmon Survey	·	2.8 km	MPC · JPL
737314	2016 BX_{32}	—	February 9, 2005	Mount Lemmon	Mount Lemmon Survey	·	2.9 km	MPC · JPL
737315	2016 BT_{35}	—	September 17, 2006	Kitt Peak	Spacewatch	KON	2.1 km	MPC · JPL
737316	2016 BC_{36}	—	March 13, 2012	Mount Lemmon	Mount Lemmon Survey	·	1.4 km	MPC · JPL
737317	2016 BN_{37}	—	April 19, 2006	Catalina	CSS	·	1.5 km	MPC · JPL
737318	2016 BQ_{38}	—	February 24, 2009	Mount Lemmon	Mount Lemmon Survey	·	820 m	MPC · JPL
737319	2016 BG_{39}	—	December 20, 2004	Mount Lemmon	Mount Lemmon Survey	L5	10 km	MPC · JPL
737320	2016 BB_{40}	—	October 1, 2014	Haleakala	Pan-STARRS 1	·	2.2 km	MPC · JPL
737321	2016 BU_{42}	—	January 29, 2016	Mount Lemmon	Mount Lemmon Survey	VER	2.2 km	MPC · JPL
737322	2016 BQ_{45}	—	September 5, 2007	Catalina	CSS	LUT	5.1 km	MPC · JPL
737323	2016 BT_{45}	—	January 16, 2005	Kitt Peak	Spacewatch	·	1.4 km	MPC · JPL
737324	2016 BL_{46}	—	February 26, 2010	WISE	WISE	·	3.3 km	MPC · JPL
737325	2016 BC_{47}	—	January 8, 2016	Haleakala	Pan-STARRS 1	·	2.1 km	MPC · JPL
737326	2016 BV_{48}	—	May 9, 2006	Mount Lemmon	Mount Lemmon Survey	VER	3.3 km	MPC · JPL
737327	2016 BO_{49}	—	February 13, 2010	WISE	WISE	·	1.9 km	MPC · JPL
737328	2016 BB_{50}	—	February 10, 2011	Mount Lemmon	Mount Lemmon Survey	EMA	2.3 km	MPC · JPL
737329	2016 BR_{55}	—	January 30, 2016	Mount Lemmon	Mount Lemmon Survey	HYG	2.2 km	MPC · JPL
737330	2016 BN_{58}	—	March 3, 2009	Kitt Peak	Spacewatch	·	700 m	MPC · JPL
737331	2016 BK_{62}	—	November 9, 2009	Kitt Peak	Spacewatch	·	2.1 km	MPC · JPL
737332	2016 BC_{65}	—	November 22, 2014	Mount Lemmon	Mount Lemmon Survey	·	1.9 km	MPC · JPL
737333	2016 BR_{66}	—	March 1, 2011	Mount Lemmon	Mount Lemmon Survey	EOS	1.3 km	MPC · JPL
737334	2016 BJ_{67}	—	September 7, 2000	Kitt Peak	Spacewatch	·	4.2 km	MPC · JPL
737335	2016 BD_{68}	—	March 24, 2006	Kitt Peak	Spacewatch	·	630 m	MPC · JPL
737336	2016 BO_{68}	—	January 7, 2016	Haleakala	Pan-STARRS 1	·	1.9 km	MPC · JPL
737337	2016 BQ_{68}	—	February 8, 2010	WISE	WISE	EOS	3.0 km	MPC · JPL
737338	2016 BF_{70}	—	September 23, 2008	Mount Lemmon	Mount Lemmon Survey	·	1.8 km	MPC · JPL
737339	2016 BQ_{70}	—	March 5, 2011	Mount Lemmon	Mount Lemmon Survey	·	2.3 km	MPC · JPL
737340	2016 BH_{71}	—	January 8, 2016	Haleakala	Pan-STARRS 1	·	1.6 km	MPC · JPL
737341	2016 BL_{71}	—	November 20, 2014	Mount Lemmon	Mount Lemmon Survey	·	2.4 km	MPC · JPL
737342	2016 BO_{71}	—	September 20, 2008	Mount Lemmon	Mount Lemmon Survey	·	1.9 km	MPC · JPL
737343	2016 BU_{73}	—	May 25, 2006	Mauna Kea	P. A. Wiegert	·	2.0 km	MPC · JPL
737344	2016 BW_{74}	—	January 31, 2003	Anderson Mesa	LONEOS	·	1.7 km	MPC · JPL
737345	2016 BK_{75}	—	January 31, 2016	Haleakala	Pan-STARRS 1	·	1.5 km	MPC · JPL
737346	2016 BT_{75}	—	January 7, 2016	Haleakala	Pan-STARRS 1	·	620 m	MPC · JPL
737347	2016 BD_{76}	—	February 25, 2011	Mount Lemmon	Mount Lemmon Survey	EOS	1.4 km	MPC · JPL
737348	2016 BY_{77}	—	October 26, 2014	Mount Lemmon	Mount Lemmon Survey	·	2.0 km	MPC · JPL
737349	2016 BD_{78}	—	March 24, 2006	Kitt Peak	Spacewatch	·	2.0 km	MPC · JPL
737350	2016 BL_{79}	—	November 18, 2009	Mount Lemmon	Mount Lemmon Survey	·	1.4 km	MPC · JPL
737351	2016 BL_{80}	—	September 11, 2002	Palomar	NEAT	(895)	3.6 km	MPC · JPL
737352	2016 BQ_{80}	—	October 8, 2002	Anderson Mesa	LONEOS	(5)	1.2 km	MPC · JPL
737353	2016 BM_{84}	—	December 13, 2009	Mount Lemmon	Mount Lemmon Survey	·	2.3 km	MPC · JPL
737354	2016 BT_{87}	—	November 24, 2003	Anderson Mesa	LONEOS	·	3.2 km	MPC · JPL
737355	2016 BX_{87}	—	February 9, 2005	Mount Lemmon	Mount Lemmon Survey	·	2.1 km	MPC · JPL
737356	2016 BY_{87}	—	January 17, 2016	Haleakala	Pan-STARRS 1	·	2.1 km	MPC · JPL
737357	2016 BF_{88}	—	September 30, 2003	Apache Point	SDSS Collaboration	EUP	2.9 km	MPC · JPL
737358	2016 BP_{88}	—	February 3, 2010	WISE	WISE	·	2.6 km	MPC · JPL
737359	2016 BW_{88}	—	November 16, 2009	Mount Lemmon	Mount Lemmon Survey	EMA	2.4 km	MPC · JPL
737360	2016 BG_{90}	—	April 17, 2010	WISE	WISE	·	4.3 km	MPC · JPL
737361	2016 BH_{90}	—	May 16, 2010	WISE	WISE	·	3.1 km	MPC · JPL
737362	2016 BB_{91}	—	November 16, 1998	Kitt Peak	Spacewatch	·	3.6 km	MPC · JPL
737363	2016 BC_{91}	—	July 21, 2010	WISE	WISE	·	1.4 km	MPC · JPL
737364	2016 BE_{94}	—	November 4, 2014	Mount Lemmon	Mount Lemmon Survey	·	2.8 km	MPC · JPL
737365	2016 BT_{94}	—	October 9, 2008	Mount Lemmon	Mount Lemmon Survey	EOS	1.5 km	MPC · JPL
737366	2016 BY_{94}	—	December 9, 2014	Haleakala	Pan-STARRS 1	·	2.3 km	MPC · JPL
737367	2016 BL_{95}	—	August 25, 2014	Haleakala	Pan-STARRS 1	·	770 m	MPC · JPL
737368	2016 BJ_{96}	—	January 1, 2016	Mount Lemmon	Mount Lemmon Survey	TEL	1.0 km	MPC · JPL
737369	2016 BM_{96}	—	September 19, 2014	Haleakala	Pan-STARRS 1	·	1.5 km	MPC · JPL
737370	2016 BN_{97}	—	March 13, 2007	Kitt Peak	Spacewatch	GEF	830 m	MPC · JPL
737371	2016 BB_{100}	—	November 26, 2014	Haleakala	Pan-STARRS 1	EOS	1.7 km	MPC · JPL
737372	2016 BH_{100}	—	November 21, 2014	Haleakala	Pan-STARRS 1	·	2.3 km	MPC · JPL
737373	2016 BE_{101}	—	January 16, 2015	Haleakala	Pan-STARRS 1	·	2.4 km	MPC · JPL
737374	2016 BH_{101}	—	September 24, 2013	Catalina	CSS	·	3.2 km	MPC · JPL
737375	2016 BM_{102}	—	November 21, 2008	Kitt Peak	Spacewatch	·	3.4 km	MPC · JPL
737376	2016 BS_{103}	—	January 30, 2016	Mount Lemmon	Mount Lemmon Survey	(17392)	1.2 km	MPC · JPL
737377	2016 BT_{103}	—	January 12, 2011	Mount Lemmon	Mount Lemmon Survey	KOR	1.1 km	MPC · JPL
737378	2016 BU_{103}	—	January 30, 2016	Mount Lemmon	Mount Lemmon Survey	KOR	960 m	MPC · JPL
737379	2016 BB_{104}	—	November 27, 2014	Mount Lemmon	Mount Lemmon Survey	·	2.5 km	MPC · JPL
737380	2016 BH_{104}	—	November 10, 2009	Kitt Peak	Spacewatch	·	2.1 km	MPC · JPL
737381	2016 BU_{104}	—	March 6, 2011	Mount Lemmon	Mount Lemmon Survey	·	1.9 km	MPC · JPL
737382	2016 BM_{116}	—	January 17, 2016	Haleakala	Pan-STARRS 1	·	2.5 km	MPC · JPL
737383	2016 BH_{122}	—	March 5, 1998	Kitt Peak	Spacewatch	MRX	810 m	MPC · JPL
737384	2016 BM_{124}	—	January 30, 2016	Mount Lemmon	Mount Lemmon Survey	MAR	860 m	MPC · JPL
737385	2016 BQ_{131}	—	October 18, 2011	Kitt Peak	Spacewatch	·	530 m	MPC · JPL
737386	2016 BP_{135}	—	January 18, 2016	Haleakala	Pan-STARRS 1	·	2.4 km	MPC · JPL
737387	2016 CO	—	January 15, 2016	Haleakala	Pan-STARRS 1	·	1.8 km	MPC · JPL
737388	2016 CD_{1}	—	August 16, 2013	Haleakala	Pan-STARRS 1	·	2.5 km	MPC · JPL
737389	2016 CQ_{1}	—	October 27, 2009	Mount Lemmon	Mount Lemmon Survey	·	2.8 km	MPC · JPL
737390	2016 CT_{1}	—	January 17, 2005	Kitt Peak	Spacewatch	·	2.8 km	MPC · JPL
737391	2016 CW_{2}	—	February 1, 2016	Haleakala	Pan-STARRS 1	·	2.4 km	MPC · JPL
737392	2016 CO_{8}	—	May 17, 2007	Kitt Peak	Spacewatch	·	1.7 km	MPC · JPL
737393	2016 CE_{9}	—	December 20, 2014	Haleakala	Pan-STARRS 1	·	2.8 km	MPC · JPL
737394	2016 CU_{9}	—	February 27, 2012	Haleakala	Pan-STARRS 1	·	1.1 km	MPC · JPL
737395	2016 CG_{10}	—	August 12, 2013	Haleakala	Pan-STARRS 1	·	3.1 km	MPC · JPL
737396	2016 CK_{10}	—	February 24, 2006	Kitt Peak	Spacewatch	·	1.4 km	MPC · JPL
737397	2016 CQ_{10}	—	January 7, 2006	Kitt Peak	Spacewatch	·	500 m	MPC · JPL
737398	2016 CG_{11}	—	February 4, 2000	Kitt Peak	Spacewatch	·	1.8 km	MPC · JPL
737399	2016 CR_{11}	—	April 12, 2010	WISE	WISE	·	3.2 km	MPC · JPL
737400	2016 CX_{11}	—	October 28, 2014	Haleakala	Pan-STARRS 1	·	1.9 km	MPC · JPL

== 737401–737500 ==
back to top

Designation			Discovery			Properties		Ref
Permanent	Provisional	Named after	Date	Site	Discoverer(s)	Category	Diam.	Ref
737401	2016 CP_{13}	—	September 2, 2008	La Sagra	OAM	·	3.2 km	MPC · JPL
737402	2016 CZ_{13}	—	February 4, 2005	Kitt Peak	Spacewatch	·	3.1 km	MPC · JPL
737403	2016 CD_{15}	—	March 6, 2011	Mount Lemmon	Mount Lemmon Survey	·	1.8 km	MPC · JPL
737404	2016 CE_{15}	—	February 27, 2006	Mount Lemmon	Mount Lemmon Survey	·	1.4 km	MPC · JPL
737405	2016 CN_{15}	—	September 28, 2008	Catalina	CSS	·	550 m	MPC · JPL
737406	2016 CP_{17}	—	March 27, 2011	Mount Lemmon	Mount Lemmon Survey	·	2.4 km	MPC · JPL
737407	2016 CU_{20}	—	March 8, 2013	Haleakala	Pan-STARRS 1	·	440 m	MPC · JPL
737408	2016 CJ_{21}	—	January 15, 2016	Haleakala	Pan-STARRS 1	·	1.4 km	MPC · JPL
737409	2016 CK_{23}	—	December 27, 2011	Mount Lemmon	Mount Lemmon Survey	·	860 m	MPC · JPL
737410	2016 CN_{24}	—	March 2, 2006	Mount Lemmon	Mount Lemmon Survey	EMA	2.9 km	MPC · JPL
737411	2016 CV_{24}	—	January 16, 2016	Haleakala	Pan-STARRS 1	·	1.9 km	MPC · JPL
737412	2016 CP_{28}	—	October 10, 2002	Apache Point	SDSS Collaboration	·	2.8 km	MPC · JPL
737413	2016 CZ_{28}	—	March 26, 2003	Palomar	NEAT	HNS	1.0 km	MPC · JPL
737414	2016 CU_{31}	—	October 18, 2012	Haleakala	Pan-STARRS 1	L5	8.4 km	MPC · JPL
737415	2016 CM_{33}	—	January 3, 2016	Haleakala	Pan-STARRS 1	·	2.4 km	MPC · JPL
737416	2016 CZ_{35}	—	November 22, 2014	Haleakala	Pan-STARRS 1	·	2.4 km	MPC · JPL
737417	2016 CH_{38}	—	May 30, 2006	Mount Lemmon	Mount Lemmon Survey	EOS	1.7 km	MPC · JPL
737418	2016 CP_{38}	—	February 19, 2010	Mount Lemmon	Mount Lemmon Survey	·	2.9 km	MPC · JPL
737419	2016 CU_{38}	—	November 22, 2014	Haleakala	Pan-STARRS 1	·	2.2 km	MPC · JPL
737420	2016 CW_{38}	—	March 6, 2011	Kitt Peak	Spacewatch	·	2.0 km	MPC · JPL
737421	2016 CJ_{40}	—	March 4, 2005	Mount Lemmon	Mount Lemmon Survey	·	2.2 km	MPC · JPL
737422	2016 CL_{44}	—	October 5, 2002	Apache Point	SDSS Collaboration	·	2.2 km	MPC · JPL
737423	2016 CP_{44}	—	January 10, 2010	Črni Vrh	Mikuž, H.	(895)	2.9 km	MPC · JPL
737424	2016 CB_{45}	—	September 3, 2002	Palomar	NEAT	·	3.6 km	MPC · JPL
737425	2016 CL_{46}	—	January 19, 1994	Kitt Peak	Spacewatch	·	2.2 km	MPC · JPL
737426	2016 CB_{48}	—	January 7, 2016	Haleakala	Pan-STARRS 1	·	2.3 km	MPC · JPL
737427	2016 CA_{49}	—	March 26, 2008	Mount Lemmon	Mount Lemmon Survey	·	860 m	MPC · JPL
737428	2016 CJ_{54}	—	January 13, 2011	Mount Lemmon	Mount Lemmon Survey	·	1.8 km	MPC · JPL
737429	2016 CP_{54}	—	May 23, 2006	Kitt Peak	Spacewatch	·	2.8 km	MPC · JPL
737430	2016 CH_{58}	—	November 21, 2014	Haleakala	Pan-STARRS 1	·	2.8 km	MPC · JPL
737431	2016 CE_{59}	—	March 13, 2011	Mount Lemmon	Mount Lemmon Survey	EOS	1.6 km	MPC · JPL
737432	2016 CF_{59}	—	April 18, 2010	WISE	WISE	·	3.7 km	MPC · JPL
737433	2016 CX_{60}	—	November 17, 2014	Haleakala	Pan-STARRS 1	·	1.9 km	MPC · JPL
737434	2016 CJ_{61}	—	April 10, 2010	WISE	WISE	·	2.7 km	MPC · JPL
737435	2016 CM_{61}	—	September 6, 2008	Mount Lemmon	Mount Lemmon Survey	·	2.0 km	MPC · JPL
737436	2016 CH_{64}	—	April 15, 2010	WISE	WISE	·	3.4 km	MPC · JPL
737437	2016 CF_{65}	—	November 21, 2009	Mount Lemmon	Mount Lemmon Survey	VER	2.9 km	MPC · JPL
737438	2016 CV_{65}	—	April 15, 2010	WISE	WISE	LIX	3.7 km	MPC · JPL
737439	2016 CF_{66}	—	October 27, 2003	Kitt Peak	Spacewatch	·	2.6 km	MPC · JPL
737440	2016 CJ_{66}	—	October 22, 2014	Kitt Peak	Spacewatch	EOS	1.6 km	MPC · JPL
737441	2016 CL_{66}	—	February 3, 2016	Haleakala	Pan-STARRS 1	·	2.6 km	MPC · JPL
737442	2016 CO_{66}	—	July 16, 2010	WISE	WISE	·	1.7 km	MPC · JPL
737443	2016 CN_{69}	—	May 1, 2006	Kitt Peak	Spacewatch	·	2.4 km	MPC · JPL
737444	2016 CJ_{70}	—	February 12, 2000	Apache Point	SDSS Collaboration	·	4.3 km	MPC · JPL
737445	2016 CD_{71}	—	October 15, 2007	Mount Lemmon	Mount Lemmon Survey	·	830 m	MPC · JPL
737446	2016 CW_{71}	—	November 10, 2009	Kitt Peak	Spacewatch	·	3.5 km	MPC · JPL
737447	2016 CV_{73}	—	April 24, 2010	WISE	WISE	·	3.6 km	MPC · JPL
737448	2016 CY_{73}	—	May 5, 2006	Siding Spring	SSS	EUP	5.2 km	MPC · JPL
737449	2016 CR_{80}	—	February 5, 2016	Haleakala	Pan-STARRS 1	·	2.4 km	MPC · JPL
737450	2016 CC_{82}	—	October 20, 2008	Mount Lemmon	Mount Lemmon Survey	·	2.1 km	MPC · JPL
737451	2016 CJ_{82}	—	April 4, 2011	Mount Lemmon	Mount Lemmon Survey	EMA	2.3 km	MPC · JPL
737452	2016 CL_{83}	—	January 8, 2016	Haleakala	Pan-STARRS 1	·	1.3 km	MPC · JPL
737453	2016 CL_{85}	—	September 9, 2013	Haleakala	Pan-STARRS 1	EOS	1.8 km	MPC · JPL
737454	2016 CA_{86}	—	August 14, 2013	Haleakala	Pan-STARRS 1	ELF	2.8 km	MPC · JPL
737455	2016 CW_{86}	—	December 10, 2009	Mount Lemmon	Mount Lemmon Survey	·	1.6 km	MPC · JPL
737456	2016 CA_{89}	—	November 22, 2014	Haleakala	Pan-STARRS 1	·	1.6 km	MPC · JPL
737457	2016 CR_{89}	—	December 23, 2014	Mount Lemmon	Mount Lemmon Survey	EOS	1.8 km	MPC · JPL
737458	2016 CJ_{91}	—	April 12, 2010	WISE	WISE	·	3.3 km	MPC · JPL
737459	2016 CN_{93}	—	February 5, 2016	Haleakala	Pan-STARRS 1	·	2.2 km	MPC · JPL
737460	2016 CT_{97}	—	November 20, 2003	Kitt Peak	Spacewatch	·	2.9 km	MPC · JPL
737461	2016 CZ_{97}	—	March 9, 2005	Vail-Jarnac	Jarnac	·	4.2 km	MPC · JPL
737462	2016 CS_{98}	—	March 3, 2005	Kitt Peak	Spacewatch	ELF	2.7 km	MPC · JPL
737463	2016 CD_{100}	—	April 1, 2010	WISE	WISE	·	2.9 km	MPC · JPL
737464	2016 CX_{101}	—	February 25, 2010	WISE	WISE	·	3.0 km	MPC · JPL
737465	2016 CA_{104}	—	April 20, 2012	Mount Lemmon	Mount Lemmon Survey	·	1.7 km	MPC · JPL
737466	2016 CF_{105}	—	February 26, 2003	Campo Imperatore	CINEOS	EUN	1.1 km	MPC · JPL
737467	2016 CH_{107}	—	November 3, 2008	Mount Lemmon	Mount Lemmon Survey	·	520 m	MPC · JPL
737468	2016 CF_{108}	—	April 1, 2011	Mount Lemmon	Mount Lemmon Survey	·	2.7 km	MPC · JPL
737469	2016 CK_{108}	—	September 29, 2009	Mount Lemmon	Mount Lemmon Survey	·	1.3 km	MPC · JPL
737470	2016 CM_{109}	—	February 5, 2016	Haleakala	Pan-STARRS 1	·	2.3 km	MPC · JPL
737471	2016 CR_{109}	—	February 5, 2016	Haleakala	Pan-STARRS 1	·	2.6 km	MPC · JPL
737472	2016 CR_{112}	—	January 8, 2010	Catalina	CSS	LUT	5.2 km	MPC · JPL
737473	2016 CC_{113}	—	September 29, 2008	Mount Lemmon	Mount Lemmon Survey	·	2.2 km	MPC · JPL
737474	2016 CM_{113}	—	October 25, 2014	Mount Lemmon	Mount Lemmon Survey	·	2.0 km	MPC · JPL
737475	2016 CN_{115}	—	April 13, 2010	WISE	WISE	·	3.7 km	MPC · JPL
737476	2016 CA_{116}	—	May 13, 2007	Siding Spring	SSS	·	730 m	MPC · JPL
737477	2016 CQ_{116}	—	January 4, 2016	Haleakala	Pan-STARRS 1	EOS	1.3 km	MPC · JPL
737478	2016 CG_{117}	—	October 11, 2002	Palomar	NEAT	·	1.1 km	MPC · JPL
737479	2016 CH_{118}	—	August 12, 2013	Haleakala	Pan-STARRS 1	·	2.4 km	MPC · JPL
737480	2016 CU_{119}	—	January 4, 2016	Haleakala	Pan-STARRS 1	·	2.9 km	MPC · JPL
737481	2016 CP_{120}	—	December 16, 2004	Kitt Peak	Spacewatch	EMA	3.0 km	MPC · JPL
737482	2016 CL_{123}	—	October 21, 2003	Kitt Peak	Spacewatch	EOS	1.9 km	MPC · JPL
737483	2016 CL_{125}	—	March 21, 2010	WISE	WISE	·	2.4 km	MPC · JPL
737484	2016 CU_{125}	—	February 5, 2010	WISE	WISE	·	1.9 km	MPC · JPL
737485	2016 CV_{126}	—	October 4, 2013	Mount Lemmon	Mount Lemmon Survey	·	2.7 km	MPC · JPL
737486	2016 CY_{128}	—	September 19, 2003	Kitt Peak	Spacewatch	EOS	1.4 km	MPC · JPL
737487	2016 CS_{129}	—	August 1, 2010	WISE	WISE	·	1.5 km	MPC · JPL
737488	2016 CV_{129}	—	April 4, 2010	WISE	WISE	·	2.4 km	MPC · JPL
737489	2016 CS_{138}	—	August 26, 2002	Palomar	NEAT	·	3.8 km	MPC · JPL
737490	2016 CT_{138}	—	April 4, 2010	WISE	WISE	·	2.9 km	MPC · JPL
737491	2016 CZ_{139}	—	March 14, 2011	Kitt Peak	Spacewatch	·	2.2 km	MPC · JPL
737492	2016 CR_{140}	—	February 6, 2016	Haleakala	Pan-STARRS 1	·	2.2 km	MPC · JPL
737493	2016 CV_{141}	—	December 11, 2014	Mount Lemmon	Mount Lemmon Survey	·	1.7 km	MPC · JPL
737494	2016 CU_{142}	—	November 29, 2014	Mount Lemmon	Mount Lemmon Survey	EOS	1.6 km	MPC · JPL
737495	2016 CX_{142}	—	April 16, 2010	WISE	WISE	·	2.3 km	MPC · JPL
737496	2016 CT_{143}	—	February 13, 2010	Mount Lemmon	Mount Lemmon Survey	·	2.6 km	MPC · JPL
737497	2016 CA_{144}	—	December 16, 1998	Kitt Peak	Spacewatch	VER	4.2 km	MPC · JPL
737498	2016 CZ_{146}	—	January 15, 2016	Haleakala	Pan-STARRS 1	·	2.9 km	MPC · JPL
737499	2016 CM_{147}	—	April 10, 2013	Haleakala	Pan-STARRS 1	(2076)	490 m	MPC · JPL
737500	2016 CD_{150}	—	February 6, 2007	Mount Lemmon	Mount Lemmon Survey	·	1.3 km	MPC · JPL

== 737501–737600 ==
back to top

Designation			Discovery			Properties		Ref
Permanent	Provisional	Named after	Date	Site	Discoverer(s)	Category	Diam.	Ref
737501	2016 CH_{150}	—	April 9, 2010	WISE	WISE	·	2.7 km	MPC · JPL
737502	2016 CV_{150}	—	June 1, 2012	Mount Lemmon	Mount Lemmon Survey	·	3.4 km	MPC · JPL
737503	2016 CL_{152}	—	December 14, 2004	Campo Imperatore	CINEOS	·	2.6 km	MPC · JPL
737504	2016 CQ_{156}	—	May 22, 2006	Kitt Peak	Spacewatch	·	2.6 km	MPC · JPL
737505	2016 CT_{156}	—	October 9, 2008	Mount Lemmon	Mount Lemmon Survey	EOS	1.5 km	MPC · JPL
737506	2016 CZ_{156}	—	April 14, 2010	Mount Lemmon	Mount Lemmon Survey	·	660 m	MPC · JPL
737507	2016 CG_{157}	—	March 28, 2010	WISE	WISE	URS	3.1 km	MPC · JPL
737508	2016 CM_{161}	—	October 22, 2009	Mount Lemmon	Mount Lemmon Survey	·	1.4 km	MPC · JPL
737509	2016 CU_{162}	—	February 26, 2011	Mount Lemmon	Mount Lemmon Survey	·	2.6 km	MPC · JPL
737510	2016 CN_{167}	—	September 18, 2003	Kitt Peak	Spacewatch	·	2.2 km	MPC · JPL
737511	2016 CM_{168}	—	October 8, 2008	Mount Lemmon	Mount Lemmon Survey	·	2.2 km	MPC · JPL
737512	2016 CQ_{168}	—	February 25, 2011	Mount Lemmon	Mount Lemmon Survey	·	2.0 km	MPC · JPL
737513	2016 CK_{170}	—	September 15, 2009	Mount Lemmon	Mount Lemmon Survey	·	1.5 km	MPC · JPL
737514	2016 CC_{174}	—	January 28, 2016	Mount Lemmon	Mount Lemmon Survey	·	2.9 km	MPC · JPL
737515	2016 CP_{176}	—	October 27, 2009	Mount Lemmon	Mount Lemmon Survey	·	2.2 km	MPC · JPL
737516	2016 CL_{177}	—	September 5, 2008	Kitt Peak	Spacewatch	·	1.9 km	MPC · JPL
737517	2016 CG_{181}	—	October 28, 2014	Kitt Peak	Spacewatch	·	2.2 km	MPC · JPL
737518	2016 CP_{181}	—	April 30, 2009	Siding Spring	SSS	·	1.6 km	MPC · JPL
737519	2016 CJ_{184}	—	May 11, 2003	Kitt Peak	Spacewatch	·	660 m	MPC · JPL
737520	2016 CU_{184}	—	December 9, 2015	Haleakala	Pan-STARRS 1	EOS	1.5 km	MPC · JPL
737521	2016 CH_{185}	—	August 31, 2013	Haleakala	Pan-STARRS 1	·	1.5 km	MPC · JPL
737522	2016 CL_{185}	—	January 29, 2016	Haleakala	Pan-STARRS 1	·	2.2 km	MPC · JPL
737523	2016 CZ_{185}	—	November 3, 2008	Kitt Peak	Spacewatch	TIR	2.8 km	MPC · JPL
737524	2016 CG_{186}	—	October 12, 2007	Mount Lemmon	Mount Lemmon Survey	·	2.7 km	MPC · JPL
737525	2016 CY_{186}	—	December 13, 2015	Haleakala	Pan-STARRS 1	L5	7.0 km	MPC · JPL
737526	2016 CO_{188}	—	March 8, 2005	Kitt Peak	Spacewatch	·	2.4 km	MPC · JPL
737527	2016 CY_{188}	—	February 5, 2009	Kitt Peak	Spacewatch	·	590 m	MPC · JPL
737528	2016 CK_{189}	—	March 15, 2005	Mount Lemmon	Mount Lemmon Survey	HYG	3.0 km	MPC · JPL
737529	2016 CL_{190}	—	January 13, 2008	Kitt Peak	Spacewatch	T_{j} (2.99) · 3:2	5.0 km	MPC · JPL
737530	2016 CB_{191}	—	January 30, 2011	Kitt Peak	Spacewatch	·	1.9 km	MPC · JPL
737531	2016 CU_{192}	—	September 27, 2011	Kitt Peak	Spacewatch	BAP	760 m	MPC · JPL
737532	2016 CW_{195}	—	September 9, 2008	Mount Lemmon	Mount Lemmon Survey	·	1.8 km	MPC · JPL
737533	2016 CH_{198}	—	October 30, 2014	Mount Lemmon	Mount Lemmon Survey	EOS	1.3 km	MPC · JPL
737534	2016 CQ_{198}	—	August 9, 2013	Haleakala	Pan-STARRS 1	·	2.1 km	MPC · JPL
737535	2016 CQ_{199}	—	May 3, 2006	Mount Lemmon	Mount Lemmon Survey	·	2.0 km	MPC · JPL
737536	2016 CH_{204}	—	February 27, 2000	Kitt Peak	Spacewatch	·	4.2 km	MPC · JPL
737537	2016 CO_{204}	—	September 4, 2007	Mount Lemmon	Mount Lemmon Survey	·	3.2 km	MPC · JPL
737538	2016 CG_{205}	—	February 9, 2016	Haleakala	Pan-STARRS 1	·	490 m	MPC · JPL
737539	2016 CM_{205}	—	March 12, 2010	WISE	WISE	EOS	3.4 km	MPC · JPL
737540	2016 CV_{205}	—	October 3, 2014	Mount Lemmon	Mount Lemmon Survey	PAD	1.3 km	MPC · JPL
737541	2016 CC_{207}	—	February 9, 2005	Mount Lemmon	Mount Lemmon Survey	·	3.1 km	MPC · JPL
737542	2016 CJ_{207}	—	February 3, 2009	Kitt Peak	Spacewatch	·	640 m	MPC · JPL
737543	2016 CP_{207}	—	November 10, 2009	Kitt Peak	Spacewatch	·	1.8 km	MPC · JPL
737544	2016 CG_{208}	—	February 9, 2016	Haleakala	Pan-STARRS 1	DOR	2.0 km	MPC · JPL
737545	2016 CO_{208}	—	April 1, 2010	WISE	WISE	·	2.4 km	MPC · JPL
737546	2016 CQ_{208}	—	February 9, 2016	Haleakala	Pan-STARRS 1	·	2.6 km	MPC · JPL
737547	2016 CY_{209}	—	March 9, 2011	Mount Lemmon	Mount Lemmon Survey	·	1.8 km	MPC · JPL
737548	2016 CL_{210}	—	March 17, 2010	WISE	WISE	·	2.9 km	MPC · JPL
737549	2016 CK_{211}	—	August 17, 2012	Haleakala	Pan-STARRS 1	·	2.4 km	MPC · JPL
737550	2016 CN_{211}	—	February 9, 2016	Haleakala	Pan-STARRS 1	VER	2.1 km	MPC · JPL
737551	2016 CA_{212}	—	October 20, 2007	Mount Lemmon	Mount Lemmon Survey	·	3.4 km	MPC · JPL
737552	2016 CP_{212}	—	March 4, 2005	Kitt Peak	Spacewatch	HYG	2.3 km	MPC · JPL
737553	2016 CS_{212}	—	November 17, 2001	Kitt Peak	Deep Lens Survey	ULA	4.6 km	MPC · JPL
737554	2016 CX_{215}	—	October 8, 2008	Mount Lemmon	Mount Lemmon Survey	·	2.2 km	MPC · JPL
737555	2016 CD_{216}	—	September 6, 2008	Mount Lemmon	Mount Lemmon Survey	·	2.0 km	MPC · JPL
737556	2016 CN_{216}	—	March 29, 2011	Mount Lemmon	Mount Lemmon Survey	EOS	1.5 km	MPC · JPL
737557	2016 CR_{216}	—	March 29, 2011	Mount Lemmon	Mount Lemmon Survey	HYG	2.3 km	MPC · JPL
737558	2016 CS_{216}	—	August 26, 2013	Haleakala	Pan-STARRS 1	EOS	1.4 km	MPC · JPL
737559	2016 CY_{217}	—	August 27, 2009	Kitt Peak	Spacewatch	·	1.3 km	MPC · JPL
737560	2016 CR_{218}	—	January 31, 2016	Mount Lemmon	Mount Lemmon Survey	·	2.6 km	MPC · JPL
737561	2016 CD_{224}	—	February 10, 2016	Haleakala	Pan-STARRS 1	·	2.0 km	MPC · JPL
737562	2016 CU_{224}	—	October 29, 2014	Kitt Peak	Spacewatch	·	2.0 km	MPC · JPL
737563	2016 CG_{225}	—	March 29, 2011	Mount Lemmon	Mount Lemmon Survey	·	2.0 km	MPC · JPL
737564	2016 CV_{226}	—	November 24, 2009	Kitt Peak	Spacewatch	·	1.8 km	MPC · JPL
737565	2016 CH_{227}	—	November 22, 2014	Haleakala	Pan-STARRS 1	·	2.0 km	MPC · JPL
737566	2016 CX_{227}	—	February 26, 2010	WISE	WISE	EOS	1.4 km	MPC · JPL
737567	2016 CV_{230}	—	November 16, 2003	Kitt Peak	Spacewatch	·	2.3 km	MPC · JPL
737568	2016 CW_{230}	—	March 5, 2013	Haleakala	Pan-STARRS 1	PHO	880 m	MPC · JPL
737569	2016 CS_{231}	—	May 4, 2006	Kitt Peak	Spacewatch	·	3.2 km	MPC · JPL
737570	2016 CL_{232}	—	March 30, 2010	WISE	WISE	·	2.5 km	MPC · JPL
737571	2016 CD_{234}	—	March 8, 2005	Kitt Peak	Spacewatch	EUP	3.9 km	MPC · JPL
737572	2016 CH_{234}	—	April 12, 2011	Mount Lemmon	Mount Lemmon Survey	·	2.0 km	MPC · JPL
737573	2016 CK_{234}	—	July 9, 2010	WISE	WISE	·	1.1 km	MPC · JPL
737574	2016 CD_{235}	—	October 15, 2003	Palomar	NEAT	·	5.0 km	MPC · JPL
737575	2016 CU_{235}	—	October 23, 2003	Apache Point	SDSS Collaboration	·	2.2 km	MPC · JPL
737576	2016 CW_{235}	—	March 9, 2011	Mount Lemmon	Mount Lemmon Survey	·	1.7 km	MPC · JPL
737577	2016 CX_{238}	—	April 10, 2010	WISE	WISE	·	3.6 km	MPC · JPL
737578	2016 CJ_{239}	—	April 17, 2010	WISE	WISE	·	3.5 km	MPC · JPL
737579	2016 CT_{240}	—	December 11, 2014	Mount Lemmon	Mount Lemmon Survey	·	1.9 km	MPC · JPL
737580	2016 CF_{242}	—	December 17, 2009	Kitt Peak	Spacewatch	·	3.0 km	MPC · JPL
737581	2016 CP_{243}	—	April 3, 2010	WISE	WISE	·	3.5 km	MPC · JPL
737582	2016 CS_{245}	—	April 2, 2005	Kitt Peak	Spacewatch	·	4.0 km	MPC · JPL
737583	2016 CC_{250}	—	March 13, 2011	Mount Lemmon	Mount Lemmon Survey	·	2.5 km	MPC · JPL
737584	2016 CF_{250}	—	January 15, 2016	Haleakala	Pan-STARRS 1	EOS	1.5 km	MPC · JPL
737585	2016 CP_{253}	—	January 29, 2016	Kitt Peak	Spacewatch	(69559)	3.3 km	MPC · JPL
737586	2016 CN_{254}	—	September 26, 2002	Palomar	NEAT	·	4.9 km	MPC · JPL
737587	2016 CF_{256}	—	March 11, 2002	Palomar	NEAT	·	820 m	MPC · JPL
737588	2016 CH_{256}	—	January 7, 2010	WISE	WISE	·	2.3 km	MPC · JPL
737589	2016 CC_{259}	—	October 27, 2009	Mount Lemmon	Mount Lemmon Survey	·	2.2 km	MPC · JPL
737590	2016 CV_{259}	—	November 22, 2002	Wrightwood	J. W. Young	·	2.9 km	MPC · JPL
737591	2016 CN_{260}	—	September 9, 2008	Mount Lemmon	Mount Lemmon Survey	·	2.9 km	MPC · JPL
737592	2016 CE_{261}	—	April 12, 2010	WISE	WISE	·	2.6 km	MPC · JPL
737593	2016 CG_{261}	—	March 1, 2004	Catalina	CSS	·	4.1 km	MPC · JPL
737594	2016 CP_{261}	—	June 26, 2010	WISE	WISE	·	3.4 km	MPC · JPL
737595	2016 CT_{261}	—	January 8, 2010	Kitt Peak	Spacewatch	·	2.3 km	MPC · JPL
737596	2016 CV_{261}	—	April 14, 2005	Catalina	CSS	·	2.6 km	MPC · JPL
737597	2016 CN_{262}	—	December 26, 2009	Kitt Peak	Spacewatch	·	2.9 km	MPC · JPL
737598	2016 CS_{263}	—	February 14, 2005	Kitt Peak	Spacewatch	·	2.3 km	MPC · JPL
737599	2016 CZ_{263}	—	November 24, 2014	Mount Lemmon	Mount Lemmon Survey	EOS	2.1 km	MPC · JPL
737600	2016 CV_{264}	—	April 4, 2003	Kitt Peak	Spacewatch	·	1.3 km	MPC · JPL

== 737601–737700 ==
back to top

Designation			Discovery			Properties		Ref
Permanent	Provisional	Named after	Date	Site	Discoverer(s)	Category	Diam.	Ref
737601	2016 CA_{272}	—	February 5, 2016	Haleakala	Pan-STARRS 1	·	2.3 km	MPC · JPL
737602	2016 CK_{272}	—	February 6, 2016	Haleakala	Pan-STARRS 1	·	2.6 km	MPC · JPL
737603	2016 CS_{272}	—	March 9, 2005	Mount Lemmon	Mount Lemmon Survey	LIX	2.8 km	MPC · JPL
737604	2016 CB_{273}	—	February 9, 2016	Mount Lemmon	Mount Lemmon Survey	·	780 m	MPC · JPL
737605	2016 CR_{274}	—	February 10, 2016	Haleakala	Pan-STARRS 1	THM	2.0 km	MPC · JPL
737606	2016 CP_{275}	—	June 7, 2010	WISE	WISE	·	2.7 km	MPC · JPL
737607	2016 CG_{276}	—	February 11, 2016	Haleakala	Pan-STARRS 1	·	2.2 km	MPC · JPL
737608	2016 CH_{278}	—	February 4, 2016	Haleakala	Pan-STARRS 1	·	2.3 km	MPC · JPL
737609	2016 CO_{278}	—	March 11, 2005	Catalina	CSS	·	3.8 km	MPC · JPL
737610	2016 CQ_{278}	—	February 9, 2005	Mount Lemmon	Mount Lemmon Survey	·	2.2 km	MPC · JPL
737611	2016 CF_{279}	—	August 9, 2002	Cerro Tololo	Deep Ecliptic Survey	·	1.9 km	MPC · JPL
737612	2016 CJ_{279}	—	September 1, 2013	Haleakala	Pan-STARRS 1	VER	2.2 km	MPC · JPL
737613	2016 CG_{280}	—	February 17, 2010	Kitt Peak	Spacewatch	VER	3.2 km	MPC · JPL
737614	2016 CJ_{282}	—	February 3, 2016	Haleakala	Pan-STARRS 1	·	1.6 km	MPC · JPL
737615	2016 CS_{282}	—	October 5, 2002	Apache Point	SDSS Collaboration	·	2.5 km	MPC · JPL
737616	2016 CA_{283}	—	March 9, 2005	Mount Lemmon	Mount Lemmon Survey	·	2.5 km	MPC · JPL
737617	2016 CD_{283}	—	February 21, 2009	Kitt Peak	Spacewatch	·	620 m	MPC · JPL
737618	2016 CR_{283}	—	October 15, 2013	Mount Lemmon	Mount Lemmon Survey	VER	2.4 km	MPC · JPL
737619	2016 CS_{283}	—	February 10, 2016	Haleakala	Pan-STARRS 1	·	560 m	MPC · JPL
737620	2016 CU_{283}	—	November 1, 2008	Kitt Peak	Spacewatch	·	1.6 km	MPC · JPL
737621	2016 CX_{283}	—	May 8, 1994	Kitt Peak	Spacewatch	LIX	3.4 km	MPC · JPL
737622	2016 CL_{284}	—	November 6, 2008	Mount Lemmon	Mount Lemmon Survey	·	5.2 km	MPC · JPL
737623	2016 CY_{284}	—	February 5, 2016	Haleakala	Pan-STARRS 1	·	1.3 km	MPC · JPL
737624	2016 CP_{286}	—	June 1, 2006	Mount Lemmon	Mount Lemmon Survey	·	2.0 km	MPC · JPL
737625	2016 CQ_{286}	—	April 24, 2011	Mount Lemmon	Mount Lemmon Survey	·	2.5 km	MPC · JPL
737626	2016 CS_{286}	—	February 3, 2016	Haleakala	Pan-STARRS 1	EOS	1.6 km	MPC · JPL
737627	2016 CD_{287}	—	September 23, 2008	Mount Lemmon	Mount Lemmon Survey	·	1.6 km	MPC · JPL
737628	2016 CY_{287}	—	September 17, 2013	Mount Lemmon	Mount Lemmon Survey	EOS	1.8 km	MPC · JPL
737629	2016 CA_{288}	—	February 9, 2016	Haleakala	Pan-STARRS 1	·	2.2 km	MPC · JPL
737630	2016 CB_{288}	—	September 9, 2013	Haleakala	Pan-STARRS 1	·	2.2 km	MPC · JPL
737631	2016 CG_{288}	—	September 1, 2013	Mount Lemmon	Mount Lemmon Survey	EOS	1.6 km	MPC · JPL
737632	2016 CJ_{288}	—	February 10, 2016	Haleakala	Pan-STARRS 1	·	2.1 km	MPC · JPL
737633	2016 CK_{288}	—	October 9, 2008	Mount Lemmon	Mount Lemmon Survey	·	1.9 km	MPC · JPL
737634	2016 CT_{289}	—	April 16, 2012	Haleakala	Pan-STARRS 1	·	1.3 km	MPC · JPL
737635	2016 CX_{290}	—	June 3, 2011	Mount Lemmon	Mount Lemmon Survey	·	3.3 km	MPC · JPL
737636	2016 CP_{291}	—	December 29, 2014	Haleakala	Pan-STARRS 1	·	2.0 km	MPC · JPL
737637	2016 CQ_{291}	—	November 21, 2014	Mount Lemmon	Mount Lemmon Survey	NAE	1.7 km	MPC · JPL
737638	2016 CR_{292}	—	February 1, 2016	Haleakala	Pan-STARRS 1	·	2.9 km	MPC · JPL
737639	2016 CP_{293}	—	November 21, 2009	Kitt Peak	Spacewatch	·	1.4 km	MPC · JPL
737640	2016 CM_{294}	—	December 23, 2014	Mount Lemmon	Mount Lemmon Survey	EOS	1.6 km	MPC · JPL
737641	2016 CT_{295}	—	August 8, 2013	Kitt Peak	Spacewatch	EOS	1.4 km	MPC · JPL
737642	2016 CO_{296}	—	March 13, 2011	Kitt Peak	Spacewatch	HYG	2.4 km	MPC · JPL
737643	2016 CJ_{297}	—	February 5, 2011	Mount Lemmon	Mount Lemmon Survey	·	1.4 km	MPC · JPL
737644	2016 CN_{297}	—	March 30, 2010	WISE	WISE	·	2.1 km	MPC · JPL
737645	2016 CM_{298}	—	February 4, 2016	Haleakala	Pan-STARRS 1	URS	2.9 km	MPC · JPL
737646	2016 CB_{299}	—	March 11, 2011	Mount Lemmon	Mount Lemmon Survey	EOS	1.6 km	MPC · JPL
737647	2016 CO_{299}	—	March 6, 2011	Kitt Peak	Spacewatch	·	2.1 km	MPC · JPL
737648	2016 CV_{299}	—	November 12, 2001	Apache Point	SDSS Collaboration	·	1.7 km	MPC · JPL
737649	2016 CL_{301}	—	March 2, 2006	Kitt Peak	Spacewatch	·	470 m	MPC · JPL
737650	2016 CU_{301}	—	September 10, 2013	Haleakala	Pan-STARRS 1	·	2.7 km	MPC · JPL
737651	2016 CW_{301}	—	February 16, 2010	Mount Lemmon	Mount Lemmon Survey	·	2.5 km	MPC · JPL
737652	2016 CD_{302}	—	February 5, 2016	Haleakala	Pan-STARRS 1	·	1.4 km	MPC · JPL
737653	2016 CN_{302}	—	March 29, 2012	Mount Lemmon	Mount Lemmon Survey	·	1.2 km	MPC · JPL
737654	2016 CD_{305}	—	May 12, 2012	Kitt Peak	Spacewatch	·	1.3 km	MPC · JPL
737655	2016 CM_{305}	—	February 6, 2016	Haleakala	Pan-STARRS 1	·	2.2 km	MPC · JPL
737656	2016 CE_{307}	—	September 4, 2008	Kitt Peak	Spacewatch	·	2.3 km	MPC · JPL
737657	2016 CJ_{307}	—	August 15, 2013	Haleakala	Pan-STARRS 1	·	2.2 km	MPC · JPL
737658	2016 CT_{307}	—	February 8, 2016	Mount Lemmon	Mount Lemmon Survey	THM	1.9 km	MPC · JPL
737659	2016 CO_{309}	—	September 9, 2013	Haleakala	Pan-STARRS 1	·	2.5 km	MPC · JPL
737660	2016 CB_{310}	—	March 14, 2011	Mount Lemmon	Mount Lemmon Survey	·	1.7 km	MPC · JPL
737661	2016 CS_{311}	—	February 10, 2016	Haleakala	Pan-STARRS 1	EUN	1.1 km	MPC · JPL
737662	2016 CP_{313}	—	November 10, 2013	Mount Lemmon	Mount Lemmon Survey	·	2.6 km	MPC · JPL
737663	2016 CA_{314}	—	March 16, 2010	Kitt Peak	Spacewatch	·	2.5 km	MPC · JPL
737664	2016 CS_{315}	—	August 10, 2012	Kitt Peak	Spacewatch	LIX	2.4 km	MPC · JPL
737665	2016 CX_{316}	—	November 12, 2001	Apache Point	SDSS Collaboration	EUN	930 m	MPC · JPL
737666	2016 CZ_{316}	—	October 3, 2013	Mount Lemmon	Mount Lemmon Survey	·	2.7 km	MPC · JPL
737667	2016 CH_{317}	—	April 2, 2011	Kitt Peak	Spacewatch	·	2.1 km	MPC · JPL
737668	2016 CX_{317}	—	November 17, 2008	Kitt Peak	Spacewatch	EOS	1.4 km	MPC · JPL
737669	2016 CW_{319}	—	February 13, 2015	Haleakala	Pan-STARRS 1	EOS	2.0 km	MPC · JPL
737670	2016 CF_{320}	—	December 18, 2014	Haleakala	Pan-STARRS 1	·	2.0 km	MPC · JPL
737671	2016 CZ_{320}	—	January 18, 2015	Mount Lemmon	Mount Lemmon Survey	EOS	1.6 km	MPC · JPL
737672	2016 CZ_{322}	—	April 1, 2003	Apache Point	SDSS Collaboration	EUN	1.1 km	MPC · JPL
737673	2016 CC_{323}	—	February 3, 2016	Haleakala	Pan-STARRS 1	·	550 m	MPC · JPL
737674	2016 CD_{325}	—	February 5, 2016	Haleakala	Pan-STARRS 1	TIR	2.3 km	MPC · JPL
737675	2016 CH_{340}	—	February 10, 2016	Haleakala	Pan-STARRS 1	NYS	990 m	MPC · JPL
737676	2016 CJ_{340}	—	February 5, 2016	Haleakala	Pan-STARRS 1	·	1.4 km	MPC · JPL
737677	2016 CM_{340}	—	February 9, 2016	Haleakala	Pan-STARRS 1	·	2.2 km	MPC · JPL
737678	2016 CO_{340}	—	February 6, 2016	Haleakala	Pan-STARRS 1	·	2.0 km	MPC · JPL
737679	2016 CU_{340}	—	February 11, 2016	Haleakala	Pan-STARRS 1	·	2.7 km	MPC · JPL
737680	2016 CC_{348}	—	February 11, 2016	Haleakala	Pan-STARRS 1	·	2.0 km	MPC · JPL
737681	2016 CW_{350}	—	October 3, 2013	Catalina	CSS	TIR	2.5 km	MPC · JPL
737682	2016 CT_{367}	—	February 3, 2016	Haleakala	Pan-STARRS 1	·	1.9 km	MPC · JPL
737683	2016 CB_{373}	—	February 6, 2016	Haleakala	Pan-STARRS 1	·	2.2 km	MPC · JPL
737684	2016 CN_{376}	—	February 10, 2016	Kitt Peak	Spacewatch	(5)	960 m	MPC · JPL
737685	2016 CY_{384}	—	February 6, 2016	Haleakala	Pan-STARRS 1	·	870 m	MPC · JPL
737686	2016 CS_{396}	—	February 10, 2016	Haleakala	Pan-STARRS 1	·	2.5 km	MPC · JPL
737687	2016 DK_{6}	—	May 23, 2001	Cerro Tololo	Deep Ecliptic Survey	HYG	3.6 km	MPC · JPL
737688	2016 DJ_{10}	—	September 14, 2013	Haleakala	Pan-STARRS 1	·	3.2 km	MPC · JPL
737689	2016 DL_{11}	—	April 4, 2010	WISE	WISE	T_{j} (2.98)	3.1 km	MPC · JPL
737690	2016 DH_{13}	—	November 17, 2014	Haleakala	Pan-STARRS 1	·	1.2 km	MPC · JPL
737691	2016 DA_{16}	—	January 19, 2005	Kitt Peak	Spacewatch	·	2.5 km	MPC · JPL
737692	2016 DR_{16}	—	March 18, 2010	WISE	WISE	·	2.7 km	MPC · JPL
737693	2016 DM_{17}	—	March 25, 2010	WISE	WISE	·	3.9 km	MPC · JPL
737694	2016 DF_{18}	—	March 9, 2010	WISE	WISE	·	2.4 km	MPC · JPL
737695	2016 DC_{21}	—	April 30, 2010	WISE	WISE	·	3.9 km	MPC · JPL
737696	2016 DD_{22}	—	February 27, 2016	Mount Lemmon	Mount Lemmon Survey	·	1.6 km	MPC · JPL
737697	2016 DC_{23}	—	September 12, 2007	Mount Lemmon	Mount Lemmon Survey	EOS	1.8 km	MPC · JPL
737698	2016 DL_{23}	—	April 16, 2007	Mount Lemmon	Mount Lemmon Survey	·	1.4 km	MPC · JPL
737699	2016 DM_{24}	—	February 4, 2016	Haleakala	Pan-STARRS 1	·	3.0 km	MPC · JPL
737700	2016 DX_{24}	—	March 10, 2005	Mount Lemmon	Mount Lemmon Survey	·	3.4 km	MPC · JPL

== 737701–737800 ==
back to top

Designation			Discovery			Properties		Ref
Permanent	Provisional	Named after	Date	Site	Discoverer(s)	Category	Diam.	Ref
737701	2016 DW_{26}	—	April 13, 2002	Palomar	NEAT	·	780 m	MPC · JPL
737702	2016 DZ_{26}	—	April 27, 2012	Haleakala	Pan-STARRS 1	·	2.5 km	MPC · JPL
737703	2016 DF_{27}	—	September 23, 2008	Kitt Peak	Spacewatch	·	2.5 km	MPC · JPL
737704	2016 DR_{27}	—	March 13, 2010	WISE	WISE	T_{j} (2.96)	4.0 km	MPC · JPL
737705	2016 DQ_{28}	—	January 16, 2011	Mount Lemmon	Mount Lemmon Survey	·	1.6 km	MPC · JPL
737706	2016 DT_{32}	—	February 14, 2010	Mount Lemmon	Mount Lemmon Survey	·	3.0 km	MPC · JPL
737707	2016 DA_{33}	—	September 2, 2013	Mount Lemmon	Mount Lemmon Survey	EOS	1.5 km	MPC · JPL
737708	2016 DA_{35}	—	February 29, 2016	Haleakala	Pan-STARRS 1	·	2.0 km	MPC · JPL
737709	2016 DE_{41}	—	February 27, 2016	Mount Lemmon	Mount Lemmon Survey	·	1.7 km	MPC · JPL
737710	2016 DF_{43}	—	February 28, 2016	Mount Lemmon	Mount Lemmon Survey	·	2.3 km	MPC · JPL
737711	2016 DK_{43}	—	February 17, 2016	Mount Lemmon	Mount Lemmon Survey	·	2.2 km	MPC · JPL
737712	2016 ED_{3}	—	November 26, 2014	Haleakala	Pan-STARRS 1	·	2.1 km	MPC · JPL
737713	2016 EH_{3}	—	February 21, 2007	Mount Lemmon	Mount Lemmon Survey	HOF	1.9 km	MPC · JPL
737714	2016 EA_{4}	—	October 1, 2009	Mount Lemmon	Mount Lemmon Survey	·	2.2 km	MPC · JPL
737715	2016 EP_{5}	—	January 8, 2000	Kitt Peak	Spacewatch	·	1.7 km	MPC · JPL
737716	2016 EF_{6}	—	March 9, 2005	Mount Lemmon	Mount Lemmon Survey	THM	2.0 km	MPC · JPL
737717	2016 ES_{7}	—	January 16, 2004	Kitt Peak	Spacewatch	·	2.2 km	MPC · JPL
737718	2016 EW_{8}	—	November 26, 2014	Haleakala	Pan-STARRS 1	·	2.5 km	MPC · JPL
737719	2016 ES_{9}	—	October 6, 2008	Mount Lemmon	Mount Lemmon Survey	·	2.6 km	MPC · JPL
737720	2016 EF_{10}	—	April 7, 2011	Bergisch Gladbach	W. Bickel	·	2.6 km	MPC · JPL
737721	2016 EK_{12}	—	January 17, 2000	Mauna Kea	Veillet, C.	·	2.7 km	MPC · JPL
737722	2016 EU_{12}	—	November 21, 2009	Mount Lemmon	Mount Lemmon Survey	·	2.9 km	MPC · JPL
737723	2016 EE_{16}	—	January 8, 2016	Haleakala	Pan-STARRS 1	·	2.5 km	MPC · JPL
737724	2016 EZ_{16}	—	January 15, 2010	Mount Lemmon	Mount Lemmon Survey	·	2.4 km	MPC · JPL
737725	2016 EH_{17}	—	March 20, 1999	Apache Point	SDSS Collaboration	·	5.6 km	MPC · JPL
737726	2016 EE_{20}	—	January 8, 2010	WISE	WISE	·	1.7 km	MPC · JPL
737727	2016 EU_{23}	—	February 17, 2010	Kitt Peak	Spacewatch	THB	3.0 km	MPC · JPL
737728	2016 EZ_{23}	—	April 6, 2005	Kitt Peak	Spacewatch	·	3.6 km	MPC · JPL
737729	2016 EH_{25}	—	March 3, 2016	Haleakala	Pan-STARRS 1	·	2.3 km	MPC · JPL
737730	2016 EA_{26}	—	January 6, 2010	Mount Lemmon	Mount Lemmon Survey	·	2.2 km	MPC · JPL
737731	2016 ED_{30}	—	May 17, 2010	WISE	WISE	·	3.9 km	MPC · JPL
737732	2016 EH_{30}	—	March 3, 2016	Mount Lemmon	Mount Lemmon Survey	·	2.1 km	MPC · JPL
737733	2016 EU_{30}	—	January 17, 2005	Kitt Peak	Spacewatch	·	3.3 km	MPC · JPL
737734	2016 EY_{30}	—	September 20, 2014	Haleakala	Pan-STARRS 1	·	2.1 km	MPC · JPL
737735	2016 EC_{31}	—	March 3, 2016	Haleakala	Pan-STARRS 1	·	2.1 km	MPC · JPL
737736	2016 EY_{31}	—	July 30, 2010	WISE	WISE	PHO	2.6 km	MPC · JPL
737737	2016 EJ_{34}	—	April 15, 2010	WISE	WISE	·	2.5 km	MPC · JPL
737738	2016 EB_{38}	—	September 18, 2003	Kitt Peak	Spacewatch	·	2.8 km	MPC · JPL
737739	2016 EG_{38}	—	December 13, 2009	Mount Lemmon	Mount Lemmon Survey	·	3.4 km	MPC · JPL
737740	2016 ER_{43}	—	November 17, 2014	Mount Lemmon	Mount Lemmon Survey	·	2.2 km	MPC · JPL
737741	2016 EV_{46}	—	November 1, 2008	Mount Lemmon	Mount Lemmon Survey	·	2.7 km	MPC · JPL
737742	2016 EB_{48}	—	April 27, 2010	WISE	WISE	·	2.8 km	MPC · JPL
737743	2016 EN_{48}	—	October 7, 2008	Mount Lemmon	Mount Lemmon Survey	·	2.3 km	MPC · JPL
737744	2016 EQ_{48}	—	April 11, 2010	WISE	WISE	·	2.4 km	MPC · JPL
737745	2016 EU_{51}	—	November 26, 2014	Haleakala	Pan-STARRS 1	·	1.7 km	MPC · JPL
737746	2016 EG_{52}	—	May 28, 2010	WISE	WISE	EUP	2.8 km	MPC · JPL
737747	2016 ES_{53}	—	May 19, 2006	Mount Lemmon	Mount Lemmon Survey	·	2.6 km	MPC · JPL
737748	2016 EY_{56}	—	November 28, 2010	Mount Lemmon	Mount Lemmon Survey	·	1.7 km	MPC · JPL
737749	2016 EA_{57}	—	March 3, 2016	Oukaïmeden	M. Ory	·	2.0 km	MPC · JPL
737750	2016 EF_{57}	—	February 14, 2010	Mount Lemmon	Mount Lemmon Survey	EOS	1.4 km	MPC · JPL
737751	2016 EM_{60}	—	September 3, 2002	Palomar	NEAT	·	3.2 km	MPC · JPL
737752	2016 EJ_{61}	—	March 30, 2010	WISE	WISE	·	2.6 km	MPC · JPL
737753	2016 EV_{61}	—	May 7, 2010	WISE	WISE	ELF	3.0 km	MPC · JPL
737754	2016 ES_{62}	—	October 31, 2008	Kitt Peak	Spacewatch	ARM	3.6 km	MPC · JPL
737755	2016 ES_{64}	—	July 1, 2006	Catalina	CSS	·	5.6 km	MPC · JPL
737756	2016 EX_{66}	—	April 7, 2010	WISE	WISE	EUP	5.3 km	MPC · JPL
737757	2016 EY_{67}	—	February 9, 2016	Haleakala	Pan-STARRS 1	·	2.9 km	MPC · JPL
737758	2016 EE_{68}	—	May 30, 2000	La Palma	D. Davis, Howell, S.	H	480 m	MPC · JPL
737759	2016 EM_{68}	—	March 16, 2010	WISE	WISE	·	3.4 km	MPC · JPL
737760	2016 ES_{68}	—	April 5, 2010	WISE	WISE	·	3.9 km	MPC · JPL
737761	2016 EC_{69}	—	May 27, 2010	WISE	WISE	·	4.1 km	MPC · JPL
737762	2016 EB_{70}	—	May 1, 2005	Palomar	NEAT	·	4.0 km	MPC · JPL
737763	2016 ER_{70}	—	October 26, 2009	Mount Lemmon	Mount Lemmon Survey	·	1.6 km	MPC · JPL
737764	2016 EN_{71}	—	March 13, 2007	Catalina	CSS	·	2.0 km	MPC · JPL
737765	2016 EY_{71}	—	October 22, 2008	Kitt Peak	Spacewatch	·	2.4 km	MPC · JPL
737766	2016 ET_{72}	—	August 10, 2004	Campo Imperatore	CINEOS	·	1.6 km	MPC · JPL
737767	2016 EZ_{72}	—	April 5, 2010	WISE	WISE	·	2.4 km	MPC · JPL
737768	2016 EN_{73}	—	February 16, 2004	Kitt Peak	Spacewatch	·	1.5 km	MPC · JPL
737769	2016 ES_{73}	—	November 12, 2001	Apache Point	SDSS	·	1.3 km	MPC · JPL
737770	2016 EK_{74}	—	January 14, 2016	Haleakala	Pan-STARRS 1	V	430 m	MPC · JPL
737771	2016 EQ_{74}	—	April 17, 1993	Kitt Peak	Spacewatch	NYS	1.2 km	MPC · JPL
737772	2016 EL_{76}	—	February 27, 2016	Mount Lemmon	Mount Lemmon Survey	VER	2.0 km	MPC · JPL
737773	2016 EX_{76}	—	September 19, 2003	Kitt Peak	Spacewatch	·	1.5 km	MPC · JPL
737774	2016 EG_{77}	—	March 4, 2005	Socorro	LINEAR	·	2.4 km	MPC · JPL
737775	2016 EO_{77}	—	December 14, 2010	Mount Lemmon	Mount Lemmon Survey	·	1.3 km	MPC · JPL
737776	2016 ET_{77}	—	February 27, 2016	Mount Lemmon	Mount Lemmon Survey	·	660 m	MPC · JPL
737777	2016 EV_{78}	—	April 4, 2005	Catalina	CSS	·	3.1 km	MPC · JPL
737778	2016 EM_{79}	—	March 10, 2010	Vail-Jarnac	Jarnac	·	3.8 km	MPC · JPL
737779	2016 EW_{79}	—	May 6, 2010	WISE	WISE	EUP	2.5 km	MPC · JPL
737780	2016 EE_{80}	—	March 28, 2011	Kitt Peak	Spacewatch	·	2.7 km	MPC · JPL
737781	2016 EL_{80}	—	November 23, 2014	Haleakala	Pan-STARRS 1	·	2.0 km	MPC · JPL
737782	2016 EP_{82}	—	April 7, 2010	WISE	WISE	·	2.4 km	MPC · JPL
737783	2016 ET_{88}	—	August 21, 2008	Kitt Peak	Spacewatch	·	2.4 km	MPC · JPL
737784	2016 EX_{88}	—	December 15, 2014	Mount Lemmon	Mount Lemmon Survey	·	2.2 km	MPC · JPL
737785	2016 EF_{89}	—	February 25, 2006	Mount Lemmon	Mount Lemmon Survey	·	1.2 km	MPC · JPL
737786	2016 ET_{90}	—	February 3, 2016	Haleakala	Pan-STARRS 1	·	2.3 km	MPC · JPL
737787	2016 EX_{90}	—	March 3, 2016	Mount Lemmon	Mount Lemmon Survey	VER	2.4 km	MPC · JPL
737788	2016 EE_{92}	—	November 29, 2014	Mount Lemmon	Mount Lemmon Survey	EOS	1.5 km	MPC · JPL
737789	2016 EU_{94}	—	February 4, 2016	Haleakala	Pan-STARRS 1	·	2.5 km	MPC · JPL
737790	2016 EX_{94}	—	March 26, 2011	Mount Lemmon	Mount Lemmon Survey	VER	2.4 km	MPC · JPL
737791	2016 EL_{97}	—	May 25, 2006	Mauna Kea	P. A. Wiegert	·	2.1 km	MPC · JPL
737792	2016 EP_{97}	—	November 12, 2014	Haleakala	Pan-STARRS 1	EOS	1.5 km	MPC · JPL
737793	2016 EV_{97}	—	February 16, 2010	Mount Lemmon	Mount Lemmon Survey	URS	2.4 km	MPC · JPL
737794	2016 EG_{98}	—	March 7, 2016	Haleakala	Pan-STARRS 1	EOS	1.5 km	MPC · JPL
737795	2016 EV_{98}	—	November 21, 2014	Haleakala	Pan-STARRS 1	EOS	1.7 km	MPC · JPL
737796	2016 ES_{99}	—	November 18, 2008	Kitt Peak	Spacewatch	·	2.8 km	MPC · JPL
737797	2016 EV_{99}	—	March 7, 2016	Haleakala	Pan-STARRS 1	·	2.7 km	MPC · JPL
737798	2016 EW_{100}	—	October 18, 1998	Kitt Peak	Spacewatch	EOS	1.5 km	MPC · JPL
737799	2016 EO_{101}	—	December 10, 2009	Mount Lemmon	Mount Lemmon Survey	·	2.6 km	MPC · JPL
737800	2016 EZ_{103}	—	October 2, 2013	Haleakala	Pan-STARRS 1	·	2.1 km	MPC · JPL

== 737801–737900 ==
back to top

Designation			Discovery			Properties		Ref
Permanent	Provisional	Named after	Date	Site	Discoverer(s)	Category	Diam.	Ref
737801	2016 EG_{104}	—	December 11, 2014	Mount Lemmon	Mount Lemmon Survey	TEL	1.1 km	MPC · JPL
737802	2016 ES_{105}	—	October 6, 2008	Mount Lemmon	Mount Lemmon Survey	·	2.6 km	MPC · JPL
737803	2016 EN_{107}	—	December 1, 2008	Kitt Peak	Spacewatch	·	2.4 km	MPC · JPL
737804	2016 EA_{108}	—	August 8, 2013	Haleakala	Pan-STARRS 1	·	1.1 km	MPC · JPL
737805	2016 EU_{109}	—	December 15, 2001	Apache Point	SDSS Collaboration	·	590 m	MPC · JPL
737806	2016 EA_{110}	—	November 25, 2006	Mount Lemmon	Mount Lemmon Survey	KON	2.2 km	MPC · JPL
737807	2016 ES_{110}	—	January 30, 2003	Anderson Mesa	LONEOS	·	1.4 km	MPC · JPL
737808	2016 EZ_{111}	—	February 14, 2010	Kitt Peak	Spacewatch	·	2.5 km	MPC · JPL
737809	2016 EE_{113}	—	October 4, 2002	Apache Point	SDSS Collaboration	·	2.5 km	MPC · JPL
737810	2016 EM_{116}	—	September 9, 2013	Haleakala	Pan-STARRS 1	·	2.2 km	MPC · JPL
737811	2016 ET_{116}	—	October 3, 2013	Haleakala	Pan-STARRS 1	·	2.0 km	MPC · JPL
737812	2016 ED_{117}	—	March 3, 2000	Apache Point	SDSS Collaboration	·	2.7 km	MPC · JPL
737813	2016 EN_{117}	—	November 26, 2014	Kitt Peak	Spacewatch	·	1.3 km	MPC · JPL
737814	2016 ET_{117}	—	September 24, 2008	Mount Lemmon	Mount Lemmon Survey	·	2.3 km	MPC · JPL
737815	2016 EZ_{118}	—	March 10, 2005	Mount Lemmon	Mount Lemmon Survey	·	3.0 km	MPC · JPL
737816	2016 EM_{119}	—	December 27, 2009	Kitt Peak	Spacewatch	·	2.3 km	MPC · JPL
737817	2016 EP_{120}	—	January 17, 2015	Haleakala	Pan-STARRS 1	·	1.6 km	MPC · JPL
737818	2016 EY_{121}	—	January 15, 2004	Kitt Peak	Spacewatch	·	1.6 km	MPC · JPL
737819	2016 EM_{122}	—	September 13, 2013	Kitt Peak	Spacewatch	·	2.4 km	MPC · JPL
737820	2016 EL_{123}	—	September 19, 2014	Haleakala	Pan-STARRS 1	·	580 m	MPC · JPL
737821	2016 EQ_{123}	—	September 12, 2002	Palomar	NEAT	EOS	2.1 km	MPC · JPL
737822	2016 EM_{124}	—	January 8, 2016	Haleakala	Pan-STARRS 1	·	2.6 km	MPC · JPL
737823	2016 EO_{124}	—	November 29, 2014	Mount Lemmon	Mount Lemmon Survey	·	1.9 km	MPC · JPL
737824	2016 EZ_{124}	—	January 3, 2009	Mount Lemmon	Mount Lemmon Survey	·	490 m	MPC · JPL
737825	2016 EU_{128}	—	February 13, 2010	Mount Lemmon	Mount Lemmon Survey	EOS	1.8 km	MPC · JPL
737826	2016 EE_{129}	—	September 13, 2007	Mount Lemmon	Mount Lemmon Survey	·	2.3 km	MPC · JPL
737827	2016 EN_{131}	—	March 10, 2016	Haleakala	Pan-STARRS 1	·	2.6 km	MPC · JPL
737828	2016 EN_{133}	—	March 12, 2010	Kitt Peak	Spacewatch	·	2.5 km	MPC · JPL
737829	2016 EH_{135}	—	January 17, 2007	Palomar	NEAT	(5)	1.4 km	MPC · JPL
737830	2016 EV_{135}	—	March 11, 2005	Mount Lemmon	Mount Lemmon Survey	EOS	1.8 km	MPC · JPL
737831	2016 EF_{139}	—	December 20, 2004	Mount Lemmon	Mount Lemmon Survey	·	710 m	MPC · JPL
737832	2016 EW_{140}	—	August 26, 2014	Charleston	R. Holmes	·	610 m	MPC · JPL
737833	2016 EB_{143}	—	February 15, 2012	Haleakala	Pan-STARRS 1	·	860 m	MPC · JPL
737834	2016 EX_{144}	—	March 9, 2005	Mount Lemmon	Mount Lemmon Survey	NYS	920 m	MPC · JPL
737835	2016 EV_{146}	—	October 5, 2002	Apache Point	SDSS Collaboration	NYS	1.1 km	MPC · JPL
737836	2016 EZ_{147}	—	April 1, 2005	Kitt Peak	Spacewatch	·	2.6 km	MPC · JPL
737837	2016 EC_{148}	—	October 26, 2008	Mount Lemmon	Mount Lemmon Survey	·	2.9 km	MPC · JPL
737838	2016 EJ_{148}	—	January 27, 2015	Haleakala	Pan-STARRS 1	·	2.4 km	MPC · JPL
737839	2016 EL_{148}	—	March 10, 2016	Haleakala	Pan-STARRS 1	·	2.3 km	MPC · JPL
737840	2016 EW_{148}	—	March 10, 2016	Haleakala	Pan-STARRS 1	VER	2.4 km	MPC · JPL
737841	2016 EC_{149}	—	February 14, 2012	Haleakala	Pan-STARRS 1	·	910 m	MPC · JPL
737842	2016 EM_{151}	—	October 26, 2011	Haleakala	Pan-STARRS 1	·	450 m	MPC · JPL
737843	2016 EN_{153}	—	September 13, 2007	Mount Lemmon	Mount Lemmon Survey	VER	2.0 km	MPC · JPL
737844	2016 EC_{154}	—	September 24, 2013	Mount Lemmon	Mount Lemmon Survey	·	2.7 km	MPC · JPL
737845	2016 EM_{154}	—	October 1, 1995	Kitt Peak	Spacewatch	·	2.6 km	MPC · JPL
737846	2016 EN_{155}	—	May 23, 2010	WISE	WISE	T_{j} (2.99)	3.4 km	MPC · JPL
737847	2016 EU_{156}	—	March 12, 2002	Kitt Peak	Spacewatch	H	460 m	MPC · JPL
737848	2016 EZ_{159}	—	March 16, 2005	Mount Lemmon	Mount Lemmon Survey	·	2.4 km	MPC · JPL
737849	2016 EQ_{161}	—	September 3, 2013	Mount Lemmon	Mount Lemmon Survey	·	2.7 km	MPC · JPL
737850	2016 EV_{163}	—	October 26, 2008	San Marcello	San Marcello	EOS	5.1 km	MPC · JPL
737851	2016 EQ_{166}	—	August 5, 2005	Palomar	NEAT	·	1.1 km	MPC · JPL
737852	2016 EJ_{168}	—	January 19, 2009	Mount Lemmon	Mount Lemmon Survey	·	510 m	MPC · JPL
737853	2016 EK_{169}	—	September 16, 2007	Bergisch Gladbach	W. Bickel	·	3.7 km	MPC · JPL
737854	2016 EK_{170}	—	March 10, 2016	Haleakala	Pan-STARRS 1	·	1.8 km	MPC · JPL
737855	2016 EL_{171}	—	May 12, 2012	Haleakala	Pan-STARRS 1	·	1.6 km	MPC · JPL
737856	2016 EN_{172}	—	March 11, 2005	Mount Lemmon	Mount Lemmon Survey	·	3.1 km	MPC · JPL
737857	2016 EA_{174}	—	January 13, 2015	Haleakala	Pan-STARRS 1	·	3.5 km	MPC · JPL
737858	2016 ET_{174}	—	November 21, 2014	Haleakala	Pan-STARRS 1	·	1.4 km	MPC · JPL
737859	2016 EX_{175}	—	February 9, 2016	Haleakala	Pan-STARRS 1	HYG	2.0 km	MPC · JPL
737860	2016 EN_{177}	—	October 25, 2008	Kitt Peak	Spacewatch	·	2.0 km	MPC · JPL
737861	2016 EO_{177}	—	March 10, 2016	Haleakala	Pan-STARRS 1	·	2.1 km	MPC · JPL
737862	2016 EZ_{177}	—	September 13, 2013	Kitt Peak	Spacewatch	·	2.0 km	MPC · JPL
737863	2016 EN_{179}	—	September 14, 2002	Palomar	NEAT	·	3.4 km	MPC · JPL
737864	2016 EZ_{180}	—	April 24, 2010	WISE	WISE	·	2.6 km	MPC · JPL
737865	2016 EJ_{182}	—	April 6, 2010	Mount Lemmon	Mount Lemmon Survey	·	3.2 km	MPC · JPL
737866	2016 EO_{187}	—	January 11, 2010	Kitt Peak	Spacewatch	·	3.0 km	MPC · JPL
737867	2016 EG_{188}	—	March 27, 2010	WISE	WISE	·	2.4 km	MPC · JPL
737868	2016 ED_{189}	—	January 7, 2010	Kitt Peak	Spacewatch	·	2.5 km	MPC · JPL
737869	2016 EV_{190}	—	May 26, 2006	Kitt Peak	Spacewatch	·	650 m	MPC · JPL
737870	2016 ET_{191}	—	January 18, 2016	Haleakala	Pan-STARRS 1	EOS	1.5 km	MPC · JPL
737871	2016 EO_{192}	—	January 8, 2016	Haleakala	Pan-STARRS 1	·	2.4 km	MPC · JPL
737872	2016 EU_{192}	—	January 8, 2010	Kitt Peak	Spacewatch	·	1.9 km	MPC · JPL
737873	2016 EM_{193}	—	September 6, 2008	Mount Lemmon	Mount Lemmon Survey	·	2.0 km	MPC · JPL
737874	2016 EX_{194}	—	March 13, 2007	Kitt Peak	Spacewatch	HOF	2.8 km	MPC · JPL
737875	2016 EJ_{196}	—	March 22, 2003	Palomar	NEAT	T_{j} (2.9)	5.0 km	MPC · JPL
737876	2016 EL_{197}	—	September 14, 2013	Haleakala	Pan-STARRS 1	·	2.9 km	MPC · JPL
737877	2016 EQ_{197}	—	September 24, 2013	Mount Lemmon	Mount Lemmon Survey	·	2.7 km	MPC · JPL
737878	2016 EW_{198}	—	January 5, 2006	Kitt Peak	Spacewatch	HOF	2.5 km	MPC · JPL
737879	2016 EE_{199}	—	September 11, 2007	Mount Lemmon	Mount Lemmon Survey	·	2.2 km	MPC · JPL
737880	2016 EN_{199}	—	February 9, 2016	Haleakala	Pan-STARRS 1	·	2.2 km	MPC · JPL
737881	2016 ET_{199}	—	March 11, 2005	Kitt Peak	Spacewatch	·	3.9 km	MPC · JPL
737882	2016 EP_{201}	—	August 12, 2006	Palomar	NEAT	·	880 m	MPC · JPL
737883	2016 ET_{208}	—	March 11, 2005	Mount Lemmon	Mount Lemmon Survey	·	1.7 km	MPC · JPL
737884	2016 EL_{211}	—	October 5, 2013	Kitt Peak	Spacewatch	EOS	1.4 km	MPC · JPL
737885	2016 EM_{215}	—	January 13, 2010	Mount Lemmon	Mount Lemmon Survey	·	1.8 km	MPC · JPL
737886	2016 EJ_{216}	—	October 20, 2008	Mount Lemmon	Mount Lemmon Survey	THM	1.7 km	MPC · JPL
737887	2016 EB_{217}	—	March 2, 2016	Mount Lemmon	Mount Lemmon Survey	·	1.4 km	MPC · JPL
737888	2016 EW_{217}	—	April 5, 2010	WISE	WISE	·	3.4 km	MPC · JPL
737889	2016 EA_{218}	—	February 14, 2010	Kitt Peak	Spacewatch	·	3.6 km	MPC · JPL
737890	2016 ED_{218}	—	September 13, 2007	Kitt Peak	Spacewatch	·	2.5 km	MPC · JPL
737891	2016 EH_{218}	—	March 6, 2010	WISE	WISE	·	2.0 km	MPC · JPL
737892	2016 ET_{218}	—	September 15, 2006	Kitt Peak	Spacewatch	·	930 m	MPC · JPL
737893	2016 ET_{219}	—	August 10, 2007	Kitt Peak	Spacewatch	URS	3.2 km	MPC · JPL
737894	2016 EK_{220}	—	January 12, 2010	WISE	WISE	(3025)	2.6 km	MPC · JPL
737895	2016 EZ_{220}	—	September 13, 2007	Mount Lemmon	Mount Lemmon Survey	·	2.7 km	MPC · JPL
737896	2016 EB_{221}	—	October 8, 2007	Mount Lemmon	Mount Lemmon Survey	·	3.3 km	MPC · JPL
737897	2016 EU_{221}	—	January 8, 2010	Kitt Peak	Spacewatch	EOS	1.7 km	MPC · JPL
737898	2016 EG_{223}	—	October 30, 2008	Kitt Peak	Spacewatch	·	3.3 km	MPC · JPL
737899	2016 EX_{223}	—	March 3, 2016	Mount Lemmon	Mount Lemmon Survey	EOS	1.6 km	MPC · JPL
737900	2016 EQ_{224}	—	March 7, 2016	Haleakala	Pan-STARRS 1	EOS	1.6 km	MPC · JPL

== 737901–738000 ==
back to top

Designation			Discovery			Properties		Ref
Permanent	Provisional	Named after	Date	Site	Discoverer(s)	Category	Diam.	Ref
737901	2016 ER_{225}	—	February 20, 2009	Mount Lemmon	Mount Lemmon Survey	·	510 m	MPC · JPL
737902	2016 ED_{226}	—	February 14, 2012	Haleakala	Pan-STARRS 1	·	830 m	MPC · JPL
737903	2016 EG_{226}	—	November 21, 2014	Mount Lemmon	Mount Lemmon Survey	·	940 m	MPC · JPL
737904	2016 EL_{226}	—	January 31, 2009	Mount Lemmon	Mount Lemmon Survey	·	520 m	MPC · JPL
737905	2016 EM_{226}	—	February 19, 2012	Mount Lemmon	Mount Lemmon Survey	V	550 m	MPC · JPL
737906	2016 EL_{227}	—	December 10, 2009	Mount Lemmon	Mount Lemmon Survey	·	1.5 km	MPC · JPL
737907	2016 EX_{228}	—	September 1, 2013	Mount Lemmon	Mount Lemmon Survey	KOR	1.0 km	MPC · JPL
737908	2016 EK_{229}	—	March 1, 2016	Mount Lemmon	Mount Lemmon Survey	·	2.0 km	MPC · JPL
737909	2016 EO_{230}	—	March 1, 2016	Haleakala	Pan-STARRS 1	·	1.5 km	MPC · JPL
737910	2016 EV_{230}	—	September 24, 2008	Kitt Peak	Spacewatch	·	2.7 km	MPC · JPL
737911	2016 EM_{231}	—	March 31, 2011	Mount Lemmon	Mount Lemmon Survey	·	2.6 km	MPC · JPL
737912	2016 ER_{231}	—	December 26, 2014	Haleakala	Pan-STARRS 1	·	2.5 km	MPC · JPL
737913	2016 EU_{231}	—	December 26, 2014	Haleakala	Pan-STARRS 1	·	2.5 km	MPC · JPL
737914	2016 ET_{234}	—	March 4, 2016	Haleakala	Pan-STARRS 1	·	1.5 km	MPC · JPL
737915	2016 EH_{237}	—	March 6, 2016	Haleakala	Pan-STARRS 1	HYG	2.0 km	MPC · JPL
737916	2016 EU_{237}	—	November 1, 2013	Mount Lemmon	Mount Lemmon Survey	·	2.5 km	MPC · JPL
737917	2016 EY_{238}	—	March 7, 2016	Haleakala	Pan-STARRS 1	EOS	1.5 km	MPC · JPL
737918	2016 EX_{239}	—	November 21, 2009	Mount Lemmon	Mount Lemmon Survey	·	2.8 km	MPC · JPL
737919	2016 EZ_{239}	—	June 16, 2012	Mount Lemmon	Mount Lemmon Survey	·	2.1 km	MPC · JPL
737920	2016 EK_{240}	—	March 10, 2016	Mount Lemmon	Mount Lemmon Survey	·	2.3 km	MPC · JPL
737921	2016 EZ_{240}	—	March 10, 2016	Haleakala	Pan-STARRS 1	·	2.4 km	MPC · JPL
737922	2016 EM_{241}	—	September 28, 2013	Mount Lemmon	Mount Lemmon Survey	·	2.3 km	MPC · JPL
737923	2016 ET_{244}	—	March 11, 2016	Haleakala	Pan-STARRS 1	·	2.4 km	MPC · JPL
737924	2016 EW_{245}	—	August 10, 2007	Kitt Peak	Spacewatch	·	2.2 km	MPC · JPL
737925	2016 EO_{248}	—	February 9, 2016	Mount Lemmon	Mount Lemmon Survey	VER	2.2 km	MPC · JPL
737926	2016 EE_{252}	—	September 18, 2006	Sacramento Peak	SDSS Collaboration	THB	2.5 km	MPC · JPL
737927	2016 EF_{265}	—	March 10, 2016	Haleakala	Pan-STARRS 1	·	2.3 km	MPC · JPL
737928	2016 ES_{268}	—	March 11, 2005	Kitt Peak	Spacewatch	NYS	740 m	MPC · JPL
737929	2016 EV_{274}	—	March 11, 2016	Haleakala	Pan-STARRS 1	·	2.3 km	MPC · JPL
737930	2016 EX_{274}	—	March 5, 2016	Haleakala	Pan-STARRS 1	·	2.7 km	MPC · JPL
737931	2016 EU_{283}	—	March 1, 2016	Haleakala	Pan-STARRS 1	·	3.2 km	MPC · JPL
737932	2016 EV_{290}	—	March 12, 2016	Haleakala	Pan-STARRS 1	·	2.4 km	MPC · JPL
737933	2016 ER_{291}	—	December 20, 2014	Haleakala	Pan-STARRS 1	·	1.9 km	MPC · JPL
737934	2016 EG_{292}	—	March 12, 2016	Haleakala	Pan-STARRS 1	·	2.5 km	MPC · JPL
737935	2016 EP_{292}	—	March 12, 2016	Haleakala	Pan-STARRS 1	·	2.5 km	MPC · JPL
737936	2016 EE_{314}	—	March 3, 2016	Haleakala	Pan-STARRS 1	·	2.5 km	MPC · JPL
737937	2016 EA_{319}	—	March 12, 2016	Haleakala	Pan-STARRS 1	·	2.3 km	MPC · JPL
737938	2016 EW_{344}	—	February 7, 2011	Mount Lemmon	Mount Lemmon Survey	·	1.4 km	MPC · JPL
737939	2016 FX	—	September 21, 1995	Haleakala	AMOS	·	1.7 km	MPC · JPL
737940	2016 FY	—	April 13, 2010	WISE	WISE	·	2.9 km	MPC · JPL
737941	2016 FY_{4}	—	May 25, 2006	Mauna Kea	P. A. Wiegert	·	750 m	MPC · JPL
737942	2016 FB_{5}	—	March 31, 2005	Junk Bond	D. Healy	MAS	550 m	MPC · JPL
737943	2016 FA_{7}	—	September 10, 2007	Mount Lemmon	Mount Lemmon Survey	·	3.1 km	MPC · JPL
737944	2016 FD_{7}	—	December 10, 2004	Kitt Peak	Spacewatch	·	2.9 km	MPC · JPL
737945	2016 FN_{9}	—	September 13, 2007	Mount Lemmon	Mount Lemmon Survey	·	650 m	MPC · JPL
737946	2016 FV_{9}	—	January 29, 2012	Mayhill-ISON	L. Elenin	·	890 m	MPC · JPL
737947	2016 FG_{10}	—	March 8, 2005	Mount Lemmon	Mount Lemmon Survey	EMA	2.8 km	MPC · JPL
737948	2016 FH_{11}	—	September 29, 2008	Kitt Peak	Spacewatch	·	2.9 km	MPC · JPL
737949	2016 FJ_{11}	—	March 14, 2016	Mount Lemmon	Mount Lemmon Survey	·	730 m	MPC · JPL
737950	2016 FQ_{11}	—	February 1, 2012	Mount Lemmon	Mount Lemmon Survey	·	820 m	MPC · JPL
737951	2016 FR_{16}	—	February 5, 2016	Haleakala	Pan-STARRS 1	·	670 m	MPC · JPL
737952	2016 FS_{16}	—	October 14, 2009	Mount Lemmon	Mount Lemmon Survey	·	1.9 km	MPC · JPL
737953	2016 FJ_{17}	—	September 9, 2007	Kitt Peak	Spacewatch	·	5.3 km	MPC · JPL
737954	2016 FY_{17}	—	April 2, 2011	Mount Lemmon	Mount Lemmon Survey	·	2.1 km	MPC · JPL
737955	2016 FW_{18}	—	June 18, 2013	Haleakala	Pan-STARRS 1	·	910 m	MPC · JPL
737956	2016 FM_{19}	—	September 2, 2014	Haleakala	Pan-STARRS 1	EUN	850 m	MPC · JPL
737957	2016 FU_{19}	—	April 5, 2005	Catalina	CSS	·	5.0 km	MPC · JPL
737958	2016 FH_{20}	—	January 17, 2016	Haleakala	Pan-STARRS 1	·	700 m	MPC · JPL
737959	2016 FT_{20}	—	November 6, 2008	Mount Lemmon	Mount Lemmon Survey	·	2.1 km	MPC · JPL
737960	2016 FY_{21}	—	June 16, 2013	Haleakala	Pan-STARRS 1	·	700 m	MPC · JPL
737961	2016 FZ_{22}	—	March 18, 2010	Mount Lemmon	Mount Lemmon Survey	·	2.6 km	MPC · JPL
737962	2016 FD_{24}	—	October 6, 2008	Mount Lemmon	Mount Lemmon Survey	HYG	1.9 km	MPC · JPL
737963	2016 FX_{25}	—	March 18, 2016	Mount Lemmon	Mount Lemmon Survey	·	560 m	MPC · JPL
737964	2016 FC_{29}	—	January 19, 2015	Mount Lemmon	Mount Lemmon Survey	·	2.3 km	MPC · JPL
737965	2016 FZ_{29}	—	April 8, 2002	Palomar	NEAT	·	740 m	MPC · JPL
737966	2016 FV_{30}	—	May 30, 2009	Mount Lemmon	Mount Lemmon Survey	MAS	520 m	MPC · JPL
737967	2016 FW_{30}	—	April 27, 2009	Mount Lemmon	Mount Lemmon Survey	NYS	710 m	MPC · JPL
737968	2016 FB_{31}	—	January 18, 2015	Mount Lemmon	Mount Lemmon Survey	·	2.2 km	MPC · JPL
737969	2016 FO_{31}	—	October 23, 2009	Kitt Peak	Spacewatch	·	1.8 km	MPC · JPL
737970	2016 FT_{31}	—	September 11, 2010	Kitt Peak	Spacewatch	V	600 m	MPC · JPL
737971	2016 FC_{33}	—	January 20, 2015	Mount Lemmon	Mount Lemmon Survey	·	2.2 km	MPC · JPL
737972	2016 FU_{33}	—	March 17, 2005	Kitt Peak	Spacewatch	·	3.4 km	MPC · JPL
737973	2016 FB_{36}	—	March 20, 1999	Apache Point	SDSS Collaboration	·	3.1 km	MPC · JPL
737974	2016 FQ_{37}	—	October 22, 2008	Mount Lemmon	Mount Lemmon Survey	·	1.9 km	MPC · JPL
737975	2016 FO_{38}	—	February 23, 2012	Mount Lemmon	Mount Lemmon Survey	·	960 m	MPC · JPL
737976	2016 FE_{39}	—	August 21, 2001	Kitt Peak	Spacewatch	·	4.4 km	MPC · JPL
737977	2016 FT_{40}	—	February 17, 2010	Mount Lemmon	Mount Lemmon Survey	·	2.2 km	MPC · JPL
737978	2016 FW_{40}	—	March 30, 2016	Haleakala	Pan-STARRS 1	·	2.4 km	MPC · JPL
737979	2016 FA_{41}	—	October 7, 2007	Mount Lemmon	Mount Lemmon Survey	·	2.7 km	MPC · JPL
737980	2016 FX_{41}	—	October 9, 2007	Mount Lemmon	Mount Lemmon Survey	·	1.4 km	MPC · JPL
737981	2016 FZ_{41}	—	February 13, 2010	Catalina	CSS	·	2.8 km	MPC · JPL
737982	2016 FQ_{42}	—	October 23, 2003	Kitt Peak	Spacewatch	·	2.9 km	MPC · JPL
737983	2016 FL_{44}	—	April 4, 2005	Mount Lemmon	Mount Lemmon Survey	·	2.1 km	MPC · JPL
737984	2016 FW_{48}	—	June 14, 2012	Mount Lemmon	Mount Lemmon Survey	·	1.4 km	MPC · JPL
737985	2016 FL_{49}	—	November 22, 2014	Haleakala	Pan-STARRS 1	·	600 m	MPC · JPL
737986	2016 FV_{49}	—	February 19, 2010	Catalina	CSS	·	2.5 km	MPC · JPL
737987	2016 FV_{52}	—	March 12, 2016	Haleakala	Pan-STARRS 1	·	2.5 km	MPC · JPL
737988	2016 FD_{53}	—	January 11, 2010	Kitt Peak	Spacewatch	·	2.7 km	MPC · JPL
737989	2016 FD_{55}	—	November 27, 2009	Mount Lemmon	Mount Lemmon Survey	·	2.7 km	MPC · JPL
737990	2016 FM_{58}	—	November 26, 2013	Haleakala	Pan-STARRS 1	·	2.7 km	MPC · JPL
737991	2016 FQ_{62}	—	December 18, 2009	Mount Lemmon	Mount Lemmon Survey	·	1.9 km	MPC · JPL
737992	2016 FL_{64}	—	March 24, 2003	Kitt Peak	Spacewatch	·	1.4 km	MPC · JPL
737993	2016 FR_{64}	—	November 30, 2003	Kitt Peak	Spacewatch	EOS	1.6 km	MPC · JPL
737994	2016 FK_{65}	—	March 16, 2016	Haleakala	Pan-STARRS 1	·	3.0 km	MPC · JPL
737995	2016 FP_{65}	—	March 16, 2016	Haleakala	Pan-STARRS 1	·	2.6 km	MPC · JPL
737996	2016 FC_{67}	—	January 26, 2011	Kitt Peak	Spacewatch	EUN	1.0 km	MPC · JPL
737997	2016 FH_{67}	—	February 18, 2015	Mount Lemmon	Mount Lemmon Survey	·	2.5 km	MPC · JPL
737998	2016 FG_{71}	—	March 31, 2016	Haleakala	Pan-STARRS 1	EOS	1.3 km	MPC · JPL
737999	2016 FN_{72}	—	March 18, 2016	Mount Lemmon	Mount Lemmon Survey	·	2.4 km	MPC · JPL
738000	2016 FF_{75}	—	March 16, 2016	Haleakala	Pan-STARRS 1	·	1.7 km	MPC · JPL

back to top

== Meaning of names ==
As minor planet discoveries are confirmed, they are given a permanent number by the IAU's Minor Planet Center (MPC), and the discoverers can then submit names for them, following the IAU's naming conventions. The list below concerns those minor planets in the specified number-range that have received names, and explains the meanings of those names.

Official naming citations of newly named small Solar System bodies are approved and published in a bulletin by IAU's Working Group for Small Bodies Nomenclature (WGSBN). Before May 2021, citations were published in MPC's Minor Planet Circulars for many decades. Recent citations can also be found on the JPL Small-Body Database (SBDB). Until his death in 2016, German astronomer Lutz D. Schmadel compiled these citations into the Dictionary of Minor Planet Names (DMP) and regularly updated the collection.

Based on Paul Herget's The Names of the Minor Planets, Schmadel also researched the unclear origin of numerous asteroids, most of which had been named prior to World War II. This article incorporates text from this source, which is in the public domain: SBDB New namings may only be added to this list below after official publication as the preannouncement of names is condemned. The WGSBN publishes a comprehensive guideline for the naming rules of non-cometary small Solar System bodies.

Named minor planet	Provisional	This minor planet was named for...	Ref · Catalog
737028 Steinbring	2016 AR_{29}	Eric Steinbring (born 1971), Canadian astronomer and Senior Research Officer at the Herzberg Astronomy and Astrophysics Institute of the National Research Council of Canada.	IAU · 737028
