= List of minor planets: 862001–863000 =

The following is a partial list of minor planets, running from minor-planet number 862001 through 863000, inclusive. The primary data for this and other partial lists is based on JPL's "Small-Body Orbital Elements" and data available from the Minor Planet Center. Critical list information is also provided by the MPC, unless otherwise specified from Lowell Observatory. A detailed description of the table's columns and additional sources are given on the main page including a complete list of every page in this series, and a statistical break-up on the dynamical classification of minor planets.

Also see the summary list of all named bodies in numerical and alphabetical order, and the corresponding naming citations for the number range of this particular list. New namings may only be added to this list after official publication, as the preannouncement of names is condemned by the Working Group for Small Bodies Nomenclature of the International Astronomical Union.

Near-Earth obj.	MBA (inner)	MBA (outer)	Centaur
Mars-crosser	MBA (middle)	Jupiter trojan	Trans-Neptunian obj.
Unclassified

== 862001–862100 ==
Designation			Discovery			Properties		Ref
Permanent	Provisional	Named after	Date	Site	Discoverer(s)	Category	Diam.	Ref
862001	2014 OJ_{459}	—	July 28, 2014	Haleakala	Pan-STARRS 1	·	430 m	MPC · JPL
862002	2014 OL_{459}	—	July 30, 2014	Haleakala	Pan-STARRS 1	EOS	1.2 km	MPC · JPL
862003	2014 OQ_{459}	—	July 25, 2014	Haleakala	Pan-STARRS 1	·	1.7 km	MPC · JPL
862004	2014 OR_{463}	—	July 25, 2014	Haleakala	Pan-STARRS 1	·	550 m	MPC · JPL
862005	2014 OW_{463}	—	July 29, 2014	Happy Jack	Wasserman, L. H.	·	900 m	MPC · JPL
862006	2014 OV_{464}	—	July 25, 2014	Haleakala	Pan-STARRS 1	·	1.3 km	MPC · JPL
862007	2014 OY_{464}	—	July 28, 2014	Haleakala	Pan-STARRS 1	·	1.8 km	MPC · JPL
862008	2014 OY_{465}	—	July 25, 2014	Haleakala	Pan-STARRS 1	ARM	2.1 km	MPC · JPL
862009	2014 OG_{467}	—	October 1, 2003	Kitt Peak	Spacewatch	·	1.7 km	MPC · JPL
862010	2014 OM_{471}	—	July 31, 2014	Haleakala	Pan-STARRS 1	·	2.2 km	MPC · JPL
862011	2014 ON_{471}	—	July 25, 2014	Haleakala	Pan-STARRS 1	·	1.8 km	MPC · JPL
862012	2014 OV_{471}	—	July 28, 2014	Haleakala	Pan-STARRS 1	·	1.8 km	MPC · JPL
862013	2014 OX_{480}	—	July 27, 2014	Haleakala	Pan-STARRS 1	·	1.8 km	MPC · JPL
862014	2014 OC_{481}	—	July 30, 2014	Haleakala	Pan-STARRS 1	·	2.1 km	MPC · JPL
862015	2014 OF_{481}	—	November 12, 2010	Kitt Peak	Spacewatch	EOS	1.3 km	MPC · JPL
862016	2014 ON_{481}	—	November 8, 2007	Mount Lemmon	Mount Lemmon Survey	·	930 m	MPC · JPL
862017	2014 OW_{482}	—	July 29, 2014	Haleakala	Pan-STARRS 1	·	1.5 km	MPC · JPL
862018	2014 PN_{1}	—	October 7, 2004	Kitt Peak	Spacewatch	·	1.5 km	MPC · JPL
862019	2014 PR_{2}	—	July 30, 2014	Haleakala	Pan-STARRS 1	·	510 m	MPC · JPL
862020	2014 PL_{3}	—	December 6, 2011	Haleakala	Pan-STARRS 1	·	610 m	MPC · JPL
862021	2014 PB_{4}	—	October 9, 2010	Kitt Peak	Spacewatch	·	1.2 km	MPC · JPL
862022	2014 PD_{9}	—	June 3, 2014	Haleakala	Pan-STARRS 1	·	590 m	MPC · JPL
862023	2014 PS_{9}	—	July 2, 2014	Haleakala	Pan-STARRS 1	·	2.1 km	MPC · JPL
862024	2014 PY_{9}	—	April 10, 2013	Haleakala	Pan-STARRS 1	THM	1.4 km	MPC · JPL
862025	2014 PM_{10}	—	August 4, 2014	Haleakala	Pan-STARRS 1	MAS	470 m	MPC · JPL
862026	2014 PD_{12}	—	March 18, 2002	Kitt Peak	Deep Ecliptic Survey	KOR	950 m	MPC · JPL
862027	2014 PH_{12}	—	September 17, 2009	Kitt Peak	Spacewatch	·	1.5 km	MPC · JPL
862028	2014 PT_{15}	—	November 4, 2007	Kitt Peak	Spacewatch	·	710 m	MPC · JPL
862029	2014 PE_{16}	—	July 25, 2014	Haleakala	Pan-STARRS 1	V	430 m	MPC · JPL
862030	2014 PH_{16}	—	March 6, 2013	Haleakala	Pan-STARRS 1	·	1.9 km	MPC · JPL
862031	2014 PF_{17}	—	January 20, 2012	Kitt Peak	Spacewatch	·	1 km	MPC · JPL
862032	2014 PH_{17}	—	July 25, 2014	Haleakala	Pan-STARRS 1	MAS	540 m	MPC · JPL
862033	2014 PZ_{17}	—	July 28, 2014	ESA OGS	ESA OGS	NYS	830 m	MPC · JPL
862034	2014 PC_{18}	—	October 8, 2004	Kitt Peak	Spacewatch	·	1.3 km	MPC · JPL
862035	2014 PO_{19}	—	September 21, 2009	Mount Lemmon	Mount Lemmon Survey	·	1.6 km	MPC · JPL
862036	2014 PF_{20}	—	August 4, 2014	Haleakala	Pan-STARRS 1	·	870 m	MPC · JPL
862037	2014 PY_{21}	—	June 26, 2014	Haleakala	Pan-STARRS 1	·	500 m	MPC · JPL
862038	2014 PE_{22}	—	June 26, 2014	Haleakala	Pan-STARRS 1	·	1.4 km	MPC · JPL
862039	2014 PR_{22}	—	October 15, 2009	Mount Lemmon	Mount Lemmon Survey	·	1.7 km	MPC · JPL
862040	2014 PO_{27}	—	October 15, 2007	Mount Lemmon	Mount Lemmon Survey	·	730 m	MPC · JPL
862041	2014 PP_{27}	—	September 30, 2003	Kitt Peak	Spacewatch	THM	1.7 km	MPC · JPL
862042	2014 PE_{28}	—	July 26, 2014	ESA OGS	ESA OGS	·	840 m	MPC · JPL
862043	2014 PN_{29}	—	October 22, 2009	Mount Lemmon	Mount Lemmon Survey	THM	1.9 km	MPC · JPL
862044	2014 PJ_{30}	—	June 24, 2014	Haleakala	Pan-STARRS 1	(1547)	1.1 km	MPC · JPL
862045	2014 PQ_{30}	—	October 1, 2010	Catalina	CSS	EUN	810 m	MPC · JPL
862046	2014 PZ_{32}	—	October 9, 2004	Kitt Peak	Spacewatch	·	480 m	MPC · JPL
862047	2014 PO_{33}	—	August 4, 2014	Haleakala	Pan-STARRS 1	·	520 m	MPC · JPL
862048	2014 PD_{34}	—	August 4, 2014	Haleakala	Pan-STARRS 1	·	1.7 km	MPC · JPL
862049	2014 PK_{35}	—	October 13, 2009	Bergisch Gladbach	W. Bickel	·	1.7 km	MPC · JPL
862050	2014 PV_{35}	—	September 13, 2007	Kitt Peak	Spacewatch	·	680 m	MPC · JPL
862051	2014 PM_{38}	—	October 9, 2007	Mount Lemmon	Mount Lemmon Survey	NYS	620 m	MPC · JPL
862052	2014 PC_{40}	—	February 16, 2013	Kitt Peak	Spacewatch	·	950 m	MPC · JPL
862053	2014 PJ_{40}	—	July 28, 2014	Haleakala	Pan-STARRS 1	·	1.4 km	MPC · JPL
862054	2014 PL_{41}	—	July 28, 2014	Haleakala	Pan-STARRS 1	EOS	1.5 km	MPC · JPL
862055	2014 PJ_{42}	—	August 4, 2014	Haleakala	Pan-STARRS 1	·	540 m	MPC · JPL
862056	2014 PD_{44}	—	August 4, 2014	Haleakala	Pan-STARRS 1	·	1.7 km	MPC · JPL
862057	2014 PQ_{44}	—	September 18, 2010	Mount Lemmon	Mount Lemmon Survey	·	1.1 km	MPC · JPL
862058	2014 PC_{45}	—	July 25, 2014	Haleakala	Pan-STARRS 1	·	1.3 km	MPC · JPL
862059	2014 PF_{46}	—	September 29, 2009	Mount Lemmon	Mount Lemmon Survey	·	2.2 km	MPC · JPL
862060	2014 PR_{47}	—	June 21, 2007	Mount Lemmon	Mount Lemmon Survey	·	530 m	MPC · JPL
862061	2014 PC_{49}	—	August 4, 2014	Haleakala	Pan-STARRS 1	·	520 m	MPC · JPL
862062	2014 PT_{49}	—	September 22, 2009	Kitt Peak	Spacewatch	·	1.5 km	MPC · JPL
862063	2014 PW_{49}	—	August 4, 2014	Haleakala	Pan-STARRS 1	MAS	520 m	MPC · JPL
862064	2014 PX_{50}	—	September 23, 2003	Saint-Sulpice	B. Christophe	NYS	760 m	MPC · JPL
862065	2014 PP_{51}	—	July 28, 2014	Haleakala	Pan-STARRS 1	·	1.8 km	MPC · JPL
862066	2014 PF_{52}	—	July 26, 2014	Haleakala	Pan-STARRS 1	V	430 m	MPC · JPL
862067	2014 PT_{53}	—	August 3, 2014	Haleakala	Pan-STARRS 1	·	1.8 km	MPC · JPL
862068	2014 PP_{54}	—	September 14, 2010	Kitt Peak	Spacewatch	·	960 m	MPC · JPL
862069	2014 PE_{58}	—	October 8, 2007	Mount Lemmon	Mount Lemmon Survey	·	840 m	MPC · JPL
862070	2014 PZ_{62}	—	October 24, 2011	Mount Lemmon	Mount Lemmon Survey	·	540 m	MPC · JPL
862071	2014 PU_{63}	—	June 29, 2014	Haleakala	Pan-STARRS 1	·	580 m	MPC · JPL
862072	2014 PB_{65}	—	October 4, 2007	Mount Lemmon	Mount Lemmon Survey	·	610 m	MPC · JPL
862073	2014 PR_{66}	—	October 9, 2007	Kitt Peak	Spacewatch	MAS	450 m	MPC · JPL
862074	2014 PB_{69}	—	October 10, 2007	Mount Lemmon	Mount Lemmon Survey	·	770 m	MPC · JPL
862075	2014 PB_{70}	—	October 23, 2004	Kitt Peak	Spacewatch	·	690 m	MPC · JPL
862076	2014 PT_{71}	—	August 4, 2014	Haleakala	Pan-STARRS 1	·	1.4 km	MPC · JPL
862077	2014 PV_{71}	—	August 5, 2014	Haleakala	Pan-STARRS 1	·	1.7 km	MPC · JPL
862078	2014 PR_{72}	—	August 3, 2014	Haleakala	Pan-STARRS 1	·	1.7 km	MPC · JPL
862079	2014 PM_{73}	—	August 3, 2014	Haleakala	Pan-STARRS 1	·	1.9 km	MPC · JPL
862080	2014 PY_{73}	—	August 3, 2014	Haleakala	Pan-STARRS 1	·	510 m	MPC · JPL
862081	2014 PF_{74}	—	September 19, 2003	Kitt Peak	Spacewatch	·	1.9 km	MPC · JPL
862082	2014 PF_{75}	—	August 3, 2014	Haleakala	Pan-STARRS 1	KOR	910 m	MPC · JPL
862083	2014 PJ_{75}	—	August 3, 2014	Haleakala	Pan-STARRS 1	·	1.9 km	MPC · JPL
862084	2014 PN_{75}	—	March 5, 2013	Mount Lemmon	Mount Lemmon Survey	·	470 m	MPC · JPL
862085	2014 PB_{76}	—	September 26, 2009	Kitt Peak	Spacewatch	·	1.4 km	MPC · JPL
862086	2014 PR_{76}	—	August 3, 2014	Haleakala	Pan-STARRS 1	HOF	1.8 km	MPC · JPL
862087	2014 PA_{79}	—	September 11, 2007	Mount Lemmon	Mount Lemmon Survey	·	750 m	MPC · JPL
862088	2014 PW_{79}	—	September 12, 2007	Kitt Peak	Spacewatch	·	670 m	MPC · JPL
862089	2014 PE_{80}	—	December 26, 2011	Mount Lemmon	Mount Lemmon Survey	·	570 m	MPC · JPL
862090	2014 PG_{80}	—	July 25, 2014	Haleakala	Pan-STARRS 1	MAS	450 m	MPC · JPL
862091	2014 PH_{81}	—	September 12, 2007	Mount Lemmon	Mount Lemmon Survey	·	660 m	MPC · JPL
862092	2014 PN_{81}	—	July 25, 2014	Haleakala	Pan-STARRS 1	·	670 m	MPC · JPL
862093	2014 PU_{81}	—	September 11, 2007	Mount Lemmon	Mount Lemmon Survey	·	640 m	MPC · JPL
862094	2014 PF_{82}	—	July 25, 2014	ESA OGS	ESA OGS	·	900 m	MPC · JPL
862095	2014 PH_{82}	—	August 3, 2014	Haleakala	Pan-STARRS 1	·	1.6 km	MPC · JPL
862096	2014 PO_{82}	—	March 27, 2007	Siding Spring	SSS	·	2.7 km	MPC · JPL
862097	2014 PZ_{82}	—	August 3, 2014	Haleakala	Pan-STARRS 1	PHO	680 m	MPC · JPL
862098	2014 PB_{83}	—	August 3, 2014	Haleakala	Pan-STARRS 1	·	1.2 km	MPC · JPL
862099	2014 PE_{83}	—	August 3, 2014	Haleakala	Pan-STARRS 1	·	1.1 km	MPC · JPL
862100	2014 PN_{83}	—	August 5, 2014	Haleakala	Pan-STARRS 1	·	2.2 km	MPC · JPL

== 862101–862200 ==
back to top

Designation			Discovery			Properties		Ref
Permanent	Provisional	Named after	Date	Site	Discoverer(s)	Category	Diam.	Ref
862101	2014 PH_{84}	—	August 6, 2014	Haleakala	Pan-STARRS 1	·	1.2 km	MPC · JPL
862102	2014 PL_{84}	—	August 6, 2014	Haleakala	Pan-STARRS 1	·	1.6 km	MPC · JPL
862103	2014 PW_{85}	—	August 3, 2014	Haleakala	Pan-STARRS 1	·	1.9 km	MPC · JPL
862104	2014 PZ_{85}	—	August 4, 2014	Haleakala	Pan-STARRS 1	·	2.0 km	MPC · JPL
862105	2014 PB_{86}	—	August 3, 2014	Haleakala	Pan-STARRS 1	MAR	710 m	MPC · JPL
862106	2014 PP_{86}	—	August 3, 2014	Haleakala	Pan-STARRS 1	·	1.8 km	MPC · JPL
862107	2014 PV_{87}	—	August 3, 2014	Haleakala	Pan-STARRS 1	·	1.8 km	MPC · JPL
862108	2014 PG_{89}	—	August 3, 2014	Haleakala	Pan-STARRS 1	ADE	1.5 km	MPC · JPL
862109	2014 PW_{89}	—	August 3, 2014	Haleakala	Pan-STARRS 1	·	710 m	MPC · JPL
862110	2014 PF_{92}	—	August 3, 2014	Haleakala	Pan-STARRS 1	HYG	1.8 km	MPC · JPL
862111	2014 PL_{92}	—	August 3, 2014	Haleakala	Pan-STARRS 1	·	1.6 km	MPC · JPL
862112	2014 PY_{92}	—	August 3, 2014	Haleakala	Pan-STARRS 1	EOS	1.3 km	MPC · JPL
862113	2014 PU_{99}	—	August 3, 2014	Haleakala	Pan-STARRS 1	·	950 m	MPC · JPL
862114	2014 PY_{99}	—	August 4, 2014	Haleakala	Pan-STARRS 1	·	720 m	MPC · JPL
862115	2014 PO_{105}	—	August 3, 2014	Haleakala	Pan-STARRS 1	THM	1.6 km	MPC · JPL
862116	2014 PP_{105}	—	August 3, 2014	Haleakala	Pan-STARRS 1	·	2.2 km	MPC · JPL
862117	2014 PS_{105}	—	August 3, 2014	Haleakala	Pan-STARRS 1	TIR	1.9 km	MPC · JPL
862118	2014 QN	—	July 7, 2014	Haleakala	Pan-STARRS 1	·	840 m	MPC · JPL
862119	2014 QY	—	July 5, 2014	Haleakala	Pan-STARRS 1	·	2.0 km	MPC · JPL
862120	2014 QF_{3}	—	May 8, 2014	Catalina	CSS	·	1.4 km	MPC · JPL
862121	2014 QX_{4}	—	April 13, 2008	Mount Lemmon	Mount Lemmon Survey	·	1.6 km	MPC · JPL
862122	2014 QA_{6}	—	July 3, 2014	Haleakala	Pan-STARRS 1	·	2.0 km	MPC · JPL
862123	2014 QL_{6}	—	July 3, 2014	Haleakala	Pan-STARRS 1	·	1.8 km	MPC · JPL
862124	2014 QC_{8}	—	July 3, 2014	Haleakala	Pan-STARRS 1	MAR	770 m	MPC · JPL
862125	2014 QH_{8}	—	July 5, 2014	Haleakala	Pan-STARRS 1	·	1.7 km	MPC · JPL
862126	2014 QL_{9}	—	June 3, 2014	Haleakala	Pan-STARRS 1	·	1.4 km	MPC · JPL
862127	2014 QN_{9}	—	August 18, 2014	Haleakala	Pan-STARRS 1	·	1.3 km	MPC · JPL
862128	2014 QF_{10}	—	August 18, 2014	Haleakala	Pan-STARRS 1	·	1.9 km	MPC · JPL
862129	2014 QU_{11}	—	July 5, 2014	Haleakala	Pan-STARRS 1	·	2.1 km	MPC · JPL
862130	2014 QM_{14}	—	August 18, 2014	Haleakala	Pan-STARRS 1	·	1.9 km	MPC · JPL
862131	2014 QX_{14}	—	April 29, 2008	Mount Lemmon	Mount Lemmon Survey	·	1.5 km	MPC · JPL
862132	2014 QH_{16}	—	August 18, 2014	Haleakala	Pan-STARRS 1	·	2.3 km	MPC · JPL
862133	2014 QQ_{16}	—	August 18, 2014	Haleakala	Pan-STARRS 1	·	790 m	MPC · JPL
862134	2014 QX_{16}	—	August 23, 2006	Palomar	NEAT	T_{j} (2.93)	3.6 km	MPC · JPL
862135	2014 QU_{20}	—	August 18, 2014	Haleakala	Pan-STARRS 1	·	520 m	MPC · JPL
862136	2014 QG_{21}	—	August 18, 2014	Haleakala	Pan-STARRS 1	·	520 m	MPC · JPL
862137	2014 QZ_{22}	—	September 2, 1998	Kitt Peak	Spacewatch	·	1.6 km	MPC · JPL
862138	2014 QZ_{23}	—	August 6, 2014	Haleakala	Pan-STARRS 1	HYG	1.8 km	MPC · JPL
862139	2014 QW_{25}	—	June 30, 2014	Mount Lemmon	Mount Lemmon Survey	·	2.2 km	MPC · JPL
862140	2014 QA_{26}	—	August 6, 2014	Haleakala	Pan-STARRS 1	·	1.6 km	MPC · JPL
862141	2014 QC_{26}	—	February 3, 2006	Mauna Kea	P. A. Wiegert, R. Rasmussen	·	2.2 km	MPC · JPL
862142	2014 QQ_{26}	—	September 17, 2003	Kitt Peak	Spacewatch	·	2.0 km	MPC · JPL
862143	2014 QG_{27}	—	August 6, 2014	Haleakala	Pan-STARRS 1	·	2.1 km	MPC · JPL
862144	2014 QX_{27}	—	August 18, 2014	Haleakala	Pan-STARRS 1	·	870 m	MPC · JPL
862145	2014 QF_{28}	—	June 16, 2010	Bergisch Gladbach	W. Bickel	·	710 m	MPC · JPL
862146	2014 QU_{28}	—	November 24, 2009	Mount Lemmon	Mount Lemmon Survey	·	1.5 km	MPC · JPL
862147	2014 QG_{30}	—	September 21, 2003	Kitt Peak	Spacewatch	PHO	630 m	MPC · JPL
862148	2014 QX_{30}	—	August 18, 2014	Haleakala	Pan-STARRS 1	·	2.3 km	MPC · JPL
862149	2014 QD_{31}	—	August 18, 2014	Haleakala	Pan-STARRS 1	·	970 m	MPC · JPL
862150	2014 QJ_{31}	—	September 25, 2003	Palomar	NEAT	·	2.4 km	MPC · JPL
862151	2014 QX_{32}	—	November 23, 2009	Mount Lemmon	Mount Lemmon Survey	H	420 m	MPC · JPL
862152	2014 QC_{33}	—	October 16, 2001	Palomar	NEAT	·	500 m	MPC · JPL
862153	2014 QE_{33}	—	September 11, 2001	Socorro	LINEAR	·	520 m	MPC · JPL
862154	2014 QD_{37}	—	September 20, 2011	Kitt Peak	Spacewatch	·	430 m	MPC · JPL
862155	2014 QJ_{39}	—	August 18, 2014	Haleakala	Pan-STARRS 1	·	740 m	MPC · JPL
862156	2014 QR_{39}	—	July 1, 2014	Haleakala	Pan-STARRS 1	AEG	2.0 km	MPC · JPL
862157	2014 QD_{40}	—	August 18, 2014	Haleakala	Pan-STARRS 1	·	1.7 km	MPC · JPL
862158	2014 QD_{41}	—	October 25, 2011	Haleakala	Pan-STARRS 1	·	790 m	MPC · JPL
862159	2014 QE_{43}	—	August 20, 2014	Haleakala	Pan-STARRS 1	EOS	1.3 km	MPC · JPL
862160	2014 QX_{43}	—	October 1, 2010	Mount Lemmon	Mount Lemmon Survey	·	1.1 km	MPC · JPL
862161	2014 QZ_{43}	—	August 3, 2014	Haleakala	Pan-STARRS 1	·	1.6 km	MPC · JPL
862162	2014 QH_{44}	—	December 3, 2010	Mount Lemmon	Mount Lemmon Survey	EOS	1.1 km	MPC · JPL
862163	2014 QB_{45}	—	July 4, 2014	Haleakala	Pan-STARRS 1	·	1.4 km	MPC · JPL
862164	2014 QK_{47}	—	November 13, 2010	Mount Lemmon	Mount Lemmon Survey	·	2.0 km	MPC · JPL
862165	2014 QU_{47}	—	August 20, 2014	Haleakala	Pan-STARRS 1	V	420 m	MPC · JPL
862166	2014 QW_{47}	—	August 3, 2014	Haleakala	Pan-STARRS 1	·	630 m	MPC · JPL
862167	2014 QG_{48}	—	September 20, 2007	Kitt Peak	Spacewatch	·	650 m	MPC · JPL
862168	2014 QH_{48}	—	May 31, 2014	Haleakala	Pan-STARRS 1	·	730 m	MPC · JPL
862169	2014 QJ_{50}	—	July 28, 2014	Haleakala	Pan-STARRS 1	·	1.4 km	MPC · JPL
862170	2014 QN_{52}	—	August 3, 2014	Haleakala	Pan-STARRS 1	·	1.2 km	MPC · JPL
862171	2014 QR_{53}	—	January 27, 2012	Mount Lemmon	Mount Lemmon Survey	EOS	1.4 km	MPC · JPL
862172	2014 QP_{54}	—	June 28, 2014	Kitt Peak	Spacewatch	·	860 m	MPC · JPL
862173	2014 QD_{55}	—	July 1, 2014	Haleakala	Pan-STARRS 1	·	1.3 km	MPC · JPL
862174	2014 QV_{55}	—	September 15, 2009	Kitt Peak	Spacewatch	·	1.2 km	MPC · JPL
862175	2014 QF_{58}	—	July 1, 2014	Haleakala	Pan-STARRS 1	·	560 m	MPC · JPL
862176	2014 QX_{59}	—	June 29, 2014	Haleakala	Pan-STARRS 1	·	1.8 km	MPC · JPL
862177	2014 QG_{60}	—	March 15, 2010	Mount Lemmon	Mount Lemmon Survey	·	450 m	MPC · JPL
862178	2014 QW_{61}	—	July 25, 2014	Haleakala	Pan-STARRS 1	·	1.8 km	MPC · JPL
862179	2014 QN_{62}	—	May 7, 2014	Haleakala	Pan-STARRS 1	·	1.3 km	MPC · JPL
862180	2014 QG_{64}	—	June 29, 2014	Haleakala	Pan-STARRS 1	·	1.7 km	MPC · JPL
862181	2014 QC_{66}	—	July 28, 2014	Haleakala	Pan-STARRS 1	·	1.5 km	MPC · JPL
862182	2014 QQ_{66}	—	July 28, 2014	Haleakala	Pan-STARRS 1	·	1.9 km	MPC · JPL
862183	2014 QA_{68}	—	July 1, 2014	Haleakala	Pan-STARRS 1	EOS	1.3 km	MPC · JPL
862184	2014 QU_{68}	—	August 20, 2014	Haleakala	Pan-STARRS 1	·	1.6 km	MPC · JPL
862185	2014 QM_{69}	—	July 1, 2014	Haleakala	Pan-STARRS 1	·	1.6 km	MPC · JPL
862186	2014 QX_{69}	—	December 13, 2010	Mount Lemmon	Mount Lemmon Survey	EOS	1.5 km	MPC · JPL
862187	2014 QB_{70}	—	July 3, 2014	Haleakala	Pan-STARRS 1	·	2.0 km	MPC · JPL
862188	2014 QB_{73}	—	August 20, 2014	Haleakala	Pan-STARRS 1	EOS	1.3 km	MPC · JPL
862189	2014 QP_{74}	—	May 8, 2013	Haleakala	Pan-STARRS 1	·	2.3 km	MPC · JPL
862190	2014 QV_{75}	—	July 1, 2014	Haleakala	Pan-STARRS 1	EOS	1.2 km	MPC · JPL
862191	2014 QZ_{76}	—	August 20, 2014	Haleakala	Pan-STARRS 1	EOS	1.2 km	MPC · JPL
862192	2014 QF_{80}	—	November 23, 2006	Mount Lemmon	Mount Lemmon Survey	·	760 m	MPC · JPL
862193	2014 QZ_{80}	—	September 19, 2009	Kitt Peak	Spacewatch	·	1.9 km	MPC · JPL
862194	2014 QV_{81}	—	July 1, 2014	Haleakala	Pan-STARRS 1	·	880 m	MPC · JPL
862195	2014 QA_{83}	—	April 16, 2013	Haleakala	Pan-STARRS 1	·	1.9 km	MPC · JPL
862196	2014 QJ_{85}	—	December 3, 2010	Mount Lemmon	Mount Lemmon Survey	EOS	1.2 km	MPC · JPL
862197	2014 QK_{87}	—	June 3, 2014	Haleakala	Pan-STARRS 1	·	2.4 km	MPC · JPL
862198	2014 QS_{87}	—	August 20, 2014	Haleakala	Pan-STARRS 1	·	2.0 km	MPC · JPL
862199	2014 QD_{90}	—	August 6, 2014	Kitt Peak	Spacewatch	·	910 m	MPC · JPL
862200	2014 QP_{90}	—	August 20, 2014	Haleakala	Pan-STARRS 1	·	1.8 km	MPC · JPL

== 862201–862300 ==
back to top

Designation			Discovery			Properties		Ref
Permanent	Provisional	Named after	Date	Site	Discoverer(s)	Category	Diam.	Ref
862201	2014 QC_{92}	—	August 20, 2014	Haleakala	Pan-STARRS 1	·	1.7 km	MPC · JPL
862202	2014 QU_{94}	—	November 22, 2011	Mount Lemmon	Mount Lemmon Survey	·	710 m	MPC · JPL
862203	2014 QT_{95}	—	June 30, 2014	Haleakala	Pan-STARRS 1	·	1.8 km	MPC · JPL
862204	2014 QP_{97}	—	August 20, 2014	Haleakala	Pan-STARRS 1	·	1.6 km	MPC · JPL
862205	2014 QZ_{100}	—	August 20, 2014	Haleakala	Pan-STARRS 1	·	1.7 km	MPC · JPL
862206	2014 QY_{101}	—	August 20, 2014	Haleakala	Pan-STARRS 1	(159)	1.7 km	MPC · JPL
862207	2014 QS_{103}	—	September 19, 2007	Kitt Peak	Spacewatch	·	660 m	MPC · JPL
862208	2014 QD_{104}	—	October 28, 2010	Mount Lemmon	Mount Lemmon Survey	·	1.3 km	MPC · JPL
862209	2014 QA_{107}	—	October 8, 2007	Mount Lemmon	Mount Lemmon Survey	·	680 m	MPC · JPL
862210	2014 QP_{111}	—	August 20, 2014	Haleakala	Pan-STARRS 1	EOS	1.2 km	MPC · JPL
862211	2014 QP_{112}	—	August 20, 2014	Haleakala	Pan-STARRS 1	·	1.5 km	MPC · JPL
862212	2014 QS_{112}	—	August 20, 2014	Haleakala	Pan-STARRS 1	EOS	1.2 km	MPC · JPL
862213	2014 QN_{113}	—	August 20, 2014	Haleakala	Pan-STARRS 1	EOS	1.3 km	MPC · JPL
862214	2014 QW_{114}	—	September 18, 2009	Mount Lemmon	Mount Lemmon Survey	·	1.6 km	MPC · JPL
862215	2014 QB_{116}	—	August 20, 2014	Haleakala	Pan-STARRS 1	EOS	1.7 km	MPC · JPL
862216	2014 QA_{118}	—	July 28, 2014	Haleakala	Pan-STARRS 1	ERI	990 m	MPC · JPL
862217	2014 QJ_{118}	—	October 12, 2007	Mount Lemmon	Mount Lemmon Survey	·	600 m	MPC · JPL
862218	2014 QT_{119}	—	August 20, 2014	Haleakala	Pan-STARRS 1	MAS	420 m	MPC · JPL
862219	2014 QS_{121}	—	August 20, 2014	Haleakala	Pan-STARRS 1	PHO	640 m	MPC · JPL
862220	2014 QA_{122}	—	May 9, 2013	Haleakala	Pan-STARRS 1	·	1.8 km	MPC · JPL
862221	2014 QY_{123}	—	August 6, 2005	Palomar	NEAT	·	1.3 km	MPC · JPL
862222	2014 QD_{124}	—	August 20, 2014	Haleakala	Pan-STARRS 1	HYG	1.7 km	MPC · JPL
862223	2014 QQ_{124}	—	August 3, 2014	Haleakala	Pan-STARRS 1	EOS	1.4 km	MPC · JPL
862224	2014 QD_{128}	—	August 6, 2014	Haleakala	Pan-STARRS 1	TIR	1.8 km	MPC · JPL
862225	2014 QP_{128}	—	August 20, 2014	Haleakala	Pan-STARRS 1	NYS	790 m	MPC · JPL
862226	2014 QA_{130}	—	March 8, 2013	Haleakala	Pan-STARRS 1	·	610 m	MPC · JPL
862227	2014 QZ_{131}	—	July 28, 2014	Haleakala	Pan-STARRS 1	·	1.3 km	MPC · JPL
862228	2014 QO_{132}	—	October 11, 2007	Mount Lemmon	Mount Lemmon Survey	·	760 m	MPC · JPL
862229	2014 QG_{133}	—	August 5, 2014	Haleakala	Pan-STARRS 1	·	2.0 km	MPC · JPL
862230	2014 QF_{135}	—	August 3, 2014	Haleakala	Pan-STARRS 1	·	2.0 km	MPC · JPL
862231	2014 QH_{135}	—	August 20, 2014	Haleakala	Pan-STARRS 1	·	1.7 km	MPC · JPL
862232	2014 QP_{136}	—	August 3, 2014	Haleakala	Pan-STARRS 1	·	1.9 km	MPC · JPL
862233	2014 QS_{136}	—	August 20, 2014	Haleakala	Pan-STARRS 1	·	2.0 km	MPC · JPL
862234	2014 QC_{137}	—	August 20, 2014	Haleakala	Pan-STARRS 1	·	450 m	MPC · JPL
862235	2014 QX_{137}	—	March 3, 2009	Kitt Peak	Spacewatch	·	880 m	MPC · JPL
862236	2014 QC_{138}	—	October 4, 1996	Kitt Peak	Spacewatch	NYS	710 m	MPC · JPL
862237	2014 QN_{139}	—	August 20, 2014	Haleakala	Pan-STARRS 1	·	1.5 km	MPC · JPL
862238	2014 QO_{140}	—	October 11, 2007	Mount Lemmon	Mount Lemmon Survey	·	730 m	MPC · JPL
862239	2014 QR_{142}	—	April 13, 2013	Haleakala	Pan-STARRS 1	·	1.6 km	MPC · JPL
862240	2014 QH_{143}	—	July 7, 2014	Haleakala	Pan-STARRS 1	·	1.9 km	MPC · JPL
862241	2014 QK_{143}	—	January 16, 2011	Mount Lemmon	Mount Lemmon Survey	·	1.7 km	MPC · JPL
862242	2014 QG_{144}	—	October 18, 2007	Kitt Peak	Spacewatch	·	830 m	MPC · JPL
862243	2014 QH_{144}	—	August 20, 2014	Haleakala	Pan-STARRS 1	·	2.1 km	MPC · JPL
862244	2014 QS_{146}	—	August 20, 2014	Haleakala	Pan-STARRS 1	·	2.0 km	MPC · JPL
862245	2014 QE_{150}	—	July 31, 2014	Haleakala	Pan-STARRS 1	PHO	580 m	MPC · JPL
862246	2014 QJ_{151}	—	July 7, 2014	Haleakala	Pan-STARRS 1	·	740 m	MPC · JPL
862247	2014 QC_{152}	—	April 9, 2010	Mount Lemmon	Mount Lemmon Survey	·	760 m	MPC · JPL
862248	2014 QJ_{152}	—	September 18, 2001	Kitt Peak	Spacewatch	·	1.2 km	MPC · JPL
862249	2014 QP_{152}	—	August 21, 2014	Oukaïmeden	C. Rinner	·	710 m	MPC · JPL
862250	2014 QV_{152}	—	June 21, 2007	Mount Lemmon	Mount Lemmon Survey	·	570 m	MPC · JPL
862251	2014 QA_{153}	—	July 30, 2014	Haleakala	Pan-STARRS 1	·	890 m	MPC · JPL
862252	2014 QP_{154}	—	August 22, 2014	Haleakala	Pan-STARRS 1	·	1.4 km	MPC · JPL
862253	2014 QW_{157}	—	March 13, 2013	Mount Lemmon	Mount Lemmon Survey	INA	1.8 km	MPC · JPL
862254	2014 QZ_{157}	—	June 29, 2014	Haleakala	Pan-STARRS 1	ADE	1.4 km	MPC · JPL
862255	2014 QF_{158}	—	June 27, 2014	Haleakala	Pan-STARRS 1	·	1.7 km	MPC · JPL
862256	2014 QF_{160}	—	June 29, 2014	Haleakala	Pan-STARRS 1	·	1.6 km	MPC · JPL
862257	2014 QO_{161}	—	September 17, 2010	Mount Lemmon	Mount Lemmon Survey	(1547)	1.1 km	MPC · JPL
862258	2014 QY_{162}	—	June 4, 2014	Haleakala	Pan-STARRS 1	·	540 m	MPC · JPL
862259	2014 QA_{163}	—	June 29, 2014	Haleakala	Pan-STARRS 1	·	1.9 km	MPC · JPL
862260	2014 QC_{163}	—	June 29, 2014	Haleakala	Pan-STARRS 1	·	1.8 km	MPC · JPL
862261	2014 QY_{163}	—	June 27, 2014	Haleakala	Pan-STARRS 1	·	2.0 km	MPC · JPL
862262	2014 QZ_{164}	—	October 20, 2003	Kitt Peak	Spacewatch	NYS	760 m	MPC · JPL
862263	2014 QC_{166}	—	July 30, 2014	Kitt Peak	Spacewatch	H	420 m	MPC · JPL
862264	2014 QX_{166}	—	August 22, 2014	Haleakala	Pan-STARRS 1	·	1.3 km	MPC · JPL
862265	2014 QG_{167}	—	August 22, 2014	Haleakala	Pan-STARRS 1	·	2.1 km	MPC · JPL
862266	2014 QY_{167}	—	August 22, 2014	Haleakala	Pan-STARRS 1	THB	2.5 km	MPC · JPL
862267	2014 QC_{168}	—	August 22, 2014	Haleakala	Pan-STARRS 1	PHO	610 m	MPC · JPL
862268	2014 QW_{168}	—	August 22, 2014	Haleakala	Pan-STARRS 1	·	1.7 km	MPC · JPL
862269	2014 QP_{169}	—	February 5, 2013	Kitt Peak	Spacewatch	H	410 m	MPC · JPL
862270	2014 QN_{170}	—	August 18, 2014	Haleakala	Pan-STARRS 1	·	1.3 km	MPC · JPL
862271	2014 QV_{170}	—	August 18, 2014	Haleakala	Pan-STARRS 1	·	920 m	MPC · JPL
862272	2014 QH_{172}	—	August 8, 1999	Kitt Peak	Spacewatch	·	870 m	MPC · JPL
862273	2014 QU_{172}	—	February 15, 2012	Haleakala	Pan-STARRS 1	·	1.3 km	MPC · JPL
862274	2014 QA_{173}	—	October 20, 2007	Mount Lemmon	Mount Lemmon Survey	NYS	720 m	MPC · JPL
862275	2014 QK_{173}	—	May 17, 2010	Kitt Peak	Spacewatch	·	600 m	MPC · JPL
862276	2014 QW_{175}	—	July 28, 2014	Haleakala	Pan-STARRS 1	·	2.0 km	MPC · JPL
862277	2014 QY_{176}	—	August 20, 2014	Haleakala	Pan-STARRS 1	·	1.7 km	MPC · JPL
862278	2014 QW_{178}	—	September 21, 2001	Sacramento Peak	SDSS	·	980 m	MPC · JPL
862279	2014 QP_{179}	—	August 20, 2014	Haleakala	Pan-STARRS 1	·	1.3 km	MPC · JPL
862280	2014 QE_{180}	—	June 20, 2014	Haleakala	Pan-STARRS 1	·	710 m	MPC · JPL
862281	2014 QR_{181}	—	June 6, 2010	ESA OGS	ESA OGS	·	770 m	MPC · JPL
862282	2014 QS_{182}	—	August 22, 2014	Haleakala	Pan-STARRS 1	·	1.4 km	MPC · JPL
862283	2014 QN_{183}	—	August 22, 2014	Haleakala	Pan-STARRS 1	EOS	1.2 km	MPC · JPL
862284	2014 QT_{183}	—	June 24, 2014	Haleakala	Pan-STARRS 1	·	2.4 km	MPC · JPL
862285	2014 QZ_{183}	—	March 4, 2013	Haleakala	Pan-STARRS 1	V	490 m	MPC · JPL
862286	2014 QR_{188}	—	August 20, 2003	Campo Imperatore	CINEOS	·	780 m	MPC · JPL
862287	2014 QQ_{191}	—	April 12, 2013	Haleakala	Pan-STARRS 1	·	1.8 km	MPC · JPL
862288	2014 QE_{193}	—	August 22, 2014	Haleakala	Pan-STARRS 1	·	2.5 km	MPC · JPL
862289	2014 QZ_{193}	—	August 22, 2014	Haleakala	Pan-STARRS 1	·	1.8 km	MPC · JPL
862290	2014 QL_{194}	—	January 9, 2011	Mount Lemmon	Mount Lemmon Survey	·	1.4 km	MPC · JPL
862291	2014 QD_{196}	—	August 22, 2014	Haleakala	Pan-STARRS 1	V	440 m	MPC · JPL
862292	2014 QG_{196}	—	September 11, 2007	Kitt Peak	Spacewatch	·	690 m	MPC · JPL
862293	2014 QD_{197}	—	August 22, 2014	Haleakala	Pan-STARRS 1	EOS	1.2 km	MPC · JPL
862294	2014 QE_{197}	—	January 14, 2011	Mount Lemmon	Mount Lemmon Survey	EOS	1.1 km	MPC · JPL
862295	2014 QV_{197}	—	August 22, 2014	Haleakala	Pan-STARRS 1	·	430 m	MPC · JPL
862296	2014 QZ_{197}	—	August 22, 2014	Haleakala	Pan-STARRS 1	·	1.8 km	MPC · JPL
862297	2014 QN_{198}	—	January 19, 2012	Haleakala	Pan-STARRS 1	·	710 m	MPC · JPL
862298	2014 QJ_{199}	—	August 22, 2014	Haleakala	Pan-STARRS 1	·	750 m	MPC · JPL
862299	2014 QP_{199}	—	September 27, 2009	Kitt Peak	Spacewatch	·	1.5 km	MPC · JPL
862300	2014 QR_{199}	—	September 19, 1998	Sacramento Peak	SDSS	·	1.9 km	MPC · JPL

== 862301–862400 ==
back to top

Designation			Discovery			Properties		Ref
Permanent	Provisional	Named after	Date	Site	Discoverer(s)	Category	Diam.	Ref
862301	2014 QN_{201}	—	August 22, 2014	Haleakala	Pan-STARRS 1	·	400 m	MPC · JPL
862302	2014 QC_{202}	—	August 22, 2014	Haleakala	Pan-STARRS 1	·	780 m	MPC · JPL
862303	2014 QN_{203}	—	October 15, 2009	Mount Lemmon	Mount Lemmon Survey	·	2.1 km	MPC · JPL
862304	2014 QZ_{204}	—	July 25, 2014	Haleakala	Pan-STARRS 1	TIR	2.1 km	MPC · JPL
862305	2014 QL_{206}	—	August 22, 2014	Haleakala	Pan-STARRS 1	·	620 m	MPC · JPL
862306	2014 QO_{206}	—	August 22, 2014	Haleakala	Pan-STARRS 1	·	1.3 km	MPC · JPL
862307	2014 QP_{206}	—	June 19, 2010	Mount Lemmon	Mount Lemmon Survey	MAS	520 m	MPC · JPL
862308	2014 QM_{207}	—	March 19, 2013	Haleakala	Pan-STARRS 1	EUN	900 m	MPC · JPL
862309	2014 QM_{211}	—	October 15, 2007	Mount Lemmon	Mount Lemmon Survey	ERI	960 m	MPC · JPL
862310	2014 QQ_{212}	—	July 28, 2014	Haleakala	Pan-STARRS 1	KOR	1 km	MPC · JPL
862311	2014 QL_{213}	—	July 28, 2014	Haleakala	Pan-STARRS 1	·	490 m	MPC · JPL
862312	2014 QQ_{213}	—	July 28, 2014	Haleakala	Pan-STARRS 1	·	640 m	MPC · JPL
862313	2014 QL_{214}	—	August 3, 2014	Haleakala	Pan-STARRS 1	AGN	800 m	MPC · JPL
862314	2014 QY_{215}	—	August 22, 2014	Haleakala	Pan-STARRS 1	·	690 m	MPC · JPL
862315	2014 QN_{216}	—	October 30, 2011	Kitt Peak	Spacewatch	·	430 m	MPC · JPL
862316	2014 QT_{217}	—	August 3, 2014	Haleakala	Pan-STARRS 1	·	2.0 km	MPC · JPL
862317	2014 QX_{217}	—	October 7, 2007	Mount Lemmon	Mount Lemmon Survey	·	780 m	MPC · JPL
862318	2014 QC_{219}	—	August 4, 2014	Haleakala	Pan-STARRS 1	·	930 m	MPC · JPL
862319	2014 QD_{224}	—	January 19, 2012	Haleakala	Pan-STARRS 1	GEF	890 m	MPC · JPL
862320	2014 QE_{224}	—	August 22, 2014	Haleakala	Pan-STARRS 1	·	1.7 km	MPC · JPL
862321	2014 QO_{224}	—	August 22, 2014	Haleakala	Pan-STARRS 1	·	1.1 km	MPC · JPL
862322	2014 QF_{226}	—	February 27, 2012	Roque de los Muchachos	EURONEAR	·	1.4 km	MPC · JPL
862323	2014 QR_{227}	—	July 28, 2014	Haleakala	Pan-STARRS 1	·	2.4 km	MPC · JPL
862324	2014 QU_{227}	—	July 4, 2005	Kitt Peak	Spacewatch	·	1.2 km	MPC · JPL
862325	2014 QK_{229}	—	August 20, 2014	Haleakala	Pan-STARRS 1	·	1.1 km	MPC · JPL
862326	2014 QM_{233}	—	November 10, 2010	Mount Lemmon	Mount Lemmon Survey	·	1.2 km	MPC · JPL
862327	2014 QA_{234}	—	July 7, 2014	Haleakala	Pan-STARRS 1	·	1.8 km	MPC · JPL
862328	2014 QG_{234}	—	August 22, 2014	Haleakala	Pan-STARRS 1	·	770 m	MPC · JPL
862329	2014 QR_{234}	—	July 7, 2014	Haleakala	Pan-STARRS 1	·	520 m	MPC · JPL
862330	2014 QY_{235}	—	September 27, 2009	Kitt Peak	Spacewatch	·	1.7 km	MPC · JPL
862331	2014 QW_{236}	—	April 6, 2002	Cerro Tololo	Deep Ecliptic Survey	NYS	710 m	MPC · JPL
862332	2014 QD_{238}	—	August 22, 2014	Haleakala	Pan-STARRS 1	·	1.6 km	MPC · JPL
862333	2014 QU_{239}	—	September 28, 2003	Kitt Peak	Spacewatch	·	760 m	MPC · JPL
862334	2014 QA_{241}	—	November 4, 2007	Kitt Peak	Spacewatch	·	600 m	MPC · JPL
862335	2014 QL_{241}	—	August 20, 2014	Haleakala	Pan-STARRS 1	·	2.2 km	MPC · JPL
862336	2014 QC_{242}	—	December 27, 2011	Kitt Peak	Spacewatch	·	730 m	MPC · JPL
862337	2014 QF_{243}	—	October 11, 2004	Kitt Peak	Spacewatch	EOS	1.2 km	MPC · JPL
862338	2014 QY_{243}	—	August 22, 2014	Haleakala	Pan-STARRS 1	·	590 m	MPC · JPL
862339	2014 QC_{245}	—	January 17, 2007	Kitt Peak	Spacewatch	·	1.1 km	MPC · JPL
862340	2014 QH_{245}	—	August 22, 2014	Haleakala	Pan-STARRS 1	·	930 m	MPC · JPL
862341	2014 QJ_{246}	—	August 22, 2014	Haleakala	Pan-STARRS 1	DOR	1.7 km	MPC · JPL
862342	2014 QO_{246}	—	May 19, 2010	Mount Lemmon	Mount Lemmon Survey	·	780 m	MPC · JPL
862343	2014 QX_{247}	—	August 22, 2014	Haleakala	Pan-STARRS 1	·	800 m	MPC · JPL
862344	2014 QL_{248}	—	August 22, 2014	Haleakala	Pan-STARRS 1	HYG	2.1 km	MPC · JPL
862345	2014 QM_{248}	—	July 31, 2014	Haleakala	Pan-STARRS 1	·	1.6 km	MPC · JPL
862346	2014 QO_{248}	—	July 31, 2014	Haleakala	Pan-STARRS 1	·	2.2 km	MPC · JPL
862347	2014 QA_{249}	—	November 6, 2010	Mount Lemmon	Mount Lemmon Survey	·	1.2 km	MPC · JPL
862348	2014 QL_{249}	—	September 19, 2003	Palomar	NEAT	·	2.1 km	MPC · JPL
862349	2014 QZ_{250}	—	August 22, 2014	Haleakala	Pan-STARRS 1	·	1.7 km	MPC · JPL
862350	2014 QA_{251}	—	August 22, 2014	Haleakala	Pan-STARRS 1	·	1.9 km	MPC · JPL
862351	2014 QL_{251}	—	September 20, 2009	Mount Lemmon	Mount Lemmon Survey	·	2.1 km	MPC · JPL
862352	2014 QN_{253}	—	November 4, 2007	Mount Lemmon	Mount Lemmon Survey	·	730 m	MPC · JPL
862353	2014 QZ_{255}	—	August 22, 2014	Haleakala	Pan-STARRS 1	EOS	1.3 km	MPC · JPL
862354	2014 QF_{256}	—	August 22, 2014	Haleakala	Pan-STARRS 1	EOS	1.3 km	MPC · JPL
862355	2014 QW_{256}	—	August 22, 2014	Haleakala	Pan-STARRS 1	EOS	1.4 km	MPC · JPL
862356	2014 QM_{258}	—	August 22, 2014	Haleakala	Pan-STARRS 1	·	2.1 km	MPC · JPL
862357	2014 QY_{258}	—	October 24, 2009	Mount Lemmon	Mount Lemmon Survey	·	2.1 km	MPC · JPL
862358	2014 QF_{259}	—	August 22, 2014	Haleakala	Pan-STARRS 1	·	1.9 km	MPC · JPL
862359	2014 QK_{260}	—	November 20, 2009	Mount Lemmon	Mount Lemmon Survey	·	2.1 km	MPC · JPL
862360	2014 QM_{260}	—	October 12, 2009	Mount Lemmon	Mount Lemmon Survey	·	2.3 km	MPC · JPL
862361	2014 QR_{260}	—	August 22, 2014	Haleakala	Pan-STARRS 1	EUP	2.2 km	MPC · JPL
862362	2014 QV_{266}	—	August 16, 2014	Haleakala	Pan-STARRS 1	H	390 m	MPC · JPL
862363	2014 QG_{268}	—	June 27, 2014	Haleakala	Pan-STARRS 1	·	1.7 km	MPC · JPL
862364	2014 QJ_{268}	—	January 27, 2006	Kitt Peak	Spacewatch	·	1.8 km	MPC · JPL
862365	2014 QT_{268}	—	July 28, 2014	Haleakala	Pan-STARRS 1	·	770 m	MPC · JPL
862366	2014 QH_{270}	—	June 29, 2014	Haleakala	Pan-STARRS 1	EOS	1.4 km	MPC · JPL
862367	2014 QQ_{271}	—	June 24, 2014	Haleakala	Pan-STARRS 1	·	2.4 km	MPC · JPL
862368	2014 QB_{273}	—	August 22, 2014	Haleakala	Pan-STARRS 1	·	1.9 km	MPC · JPL
862369	2014 QO_{273}	—	July 1, 2014	Haleakala	Pan-STARRS 1	·	540 m	MPC · JPL
862370	2014 QF_{274}	—	August 23, 2014	Haleakala	Pan-STARRS 1	·	1.6 km	MPC · JPL
862371	2014 QM_{274}	—	August 23, 2014	Haleakala	Pan-STARRS 1	·	2.6 km	MPC · JPL
862372	2014 QA_{275}	—	August 23, 2014	Haleakala	Pan-STARRS 1	·	1.2 km	MPC · JPL
862373	2014 QU_{275}	—	September 30, 2005	Palomar	NEAT	·	1.3 km	MPC · JPL
862374	2014 QK_{278}	—	August 15, 2014	Haleakala	Pan-STARRS 1	·	650 m	MPC · JPL
862375	2014 QP_{278}	—	August 14, 2014	Haleakala	Pan-STARRS 1	·	1.7 km	MPC · JPL
862376	2014 QA_{279}	—	June 5, 2014	Haleakala	Pan-STARRS 1	V	450 m	MPC · JPL
862377	2014 QU_{279}	—	July 27, 2014	ESA OGS	ESA OGS	·	1.8 km	MPC · JPL
862378	2014 QW_{279}	—	July 1, 2014	Haleakala	Pan-STARRS 1	PHO	700 m	MPC · JPL
862379	2014 QW_{280}	—	July 2, 2014	Haleakala	Pan-STARRS 1	H	290 m	MPC · JPL
862380	2014 QP_{281}	—	August 23, 2003	Palomar	NEAT	NYS	790 m	MPC · JPL
862381	2014 QA_{282}	—	February 23, 2007	Mount Lemmon	Mount Lemmon Survey	TIR	1.9 km	MPC · JPL
862382	2014 QD_{284}	—	April 2, 2009	Kitt Peak	Spacewatch	·	1.3 km	MPC · JPL
862383	2014 QJ_{286}	—	August 25, 2014	Haleakala	Pan-STARRS 1	·	1.7 km	MPC · JPL
862384	2014 QV_{287}	—	August 25, 2014	Haleakala	Pan-STARRS 1	·	2.0 km	MPC · JPL
862385	2014 QM_{289}	—	August 25, 2014	Haleakala	Pan-STARRS 1	TIR	2.2 km	MPC · JPL
862386	2014 QG_{290}	—	August 25, 2014	Haleakala	Pan-STARRS 1	·	1.7 km	MPC · JPL
862387	2014 QE_{291}	—	October 21, 2003	Kitt Peak	Spacewatch	·	2.0 km	MPC · JPL
862388	2014 QL_{291}	—	August 25, 2014	Haleakala	Pan-STARRS 1	·	2.4 km	MPC · JPL
862389	2014 QH_{293}	—	April 15, 2013	Haleakala	Pan-STARRS 1	·	1.4 km	MPC · JPL
862390	2014 QJ_{293}	—	August 25, 2014	Haleakala	Pan-STARRS 1	·	2.0 km	MPC · JPL
862391	2014 QX_{294}	—	August 25, 2014	Haleakala	Pan-STARRS 1	·	1.5 km	MPC · JPL
862392	2014 QD_{296}	—	July 3, 2014	Haleakala	Pan-STARRS 1	H	470 m	MPC · JPL
862393	2014 QB_{298}	—	August 20, 2014	Haleakala	Pan-STARRS 1	·	1.9 km	MPC · JPL
862394	2014 QM_{298}	—	March 25, 2006	Mount Lemmon	Mount Lemmon Survey	·	790 m	MPC · JPL
862395	2014 QE_{300}	—	September 28, 2003	Kitt Peak	Spacewatch	MAS	510 m	MPC · JPL
862396	2014 QG_{301}	—	August 20, 2014	Haleakala	Pan-STARRS 1	·	880 m	MPC · JPL
862397	2014 QX_{301}	—	August 20, 2014	Haleakala	Pan-STARRS 1	·	1.5 km	MPC · JPL
862398	2014 QC_{304}	—	February 14, 2013	Kitt Peak	Spacewatch	·	1.5 km	MPC · JPL
862399	2014 QE_{304}	—	February 23, 2012	Mount Lemmon	Mount Lemmon Survey	URS	2.4 km	MPC · JPL
862400	2014 QW_{304}	—	August 23, 2014	Oukaïmeden	C. Rinner	·	530 m	MPC · JPL

== 862401–862500 ==
back to top

Designation			Discovery			Properties		Ref
Permanent	Provisional	Named after	Date	Site	Discoverer(s)	Category	Diam.	Ref
862401	2014 QY_{304}	—	June 27, 2014	Haleakala	Pan-STARRS 1	H	230 m	MPC · JPL
862402	2014 QH_{306}	—	August 23, 2014	Haleakala	Pan-STARRS 1	T_{j} (2.99) · EUP	1.6 km	MPC · JPL
862403	2014 QV_{308}	—	November 1, 2007	Kitt Peak	Spacewatch	NYS	740 m	MPC · JPL
862404	2014 QE_{310}	—	September 26, 2009	Mount Lemmon	Mount Lemmon Survey	·	2.3 km	MPC · JPL
862405	2014 QO_{311}	—	July 25, 2014	Haleakala	Pan-STARRS 1	·	770 m	MPC · JPL
862406	2014 QX_{311}	—	July 4, 2014	Haleakala	Pan-STARRS 1	·	740 m	MPC · JPL
862407	2014 QK_{312}	—	July 25, 2014	Haleakala	Pan-STARRS 1	·	890 m	MPC · JPL
862408	2014 QS_{313}	—	May 9, 2006	Mount Lemmon	Mount Lemmon Survey	·	830 m	MPC · JPL
862409	2014 QZ_{313}	—	July 28, 2014	Haleakala	Pan-STARRS 1	·	1.7 km	MPC · JPL
862410	2014 QP_{314}	—	August 1, 2014	Haleakala	Pan-STARRS 1	·	1.3 km	MPC · JPL
862411	2014 QS_{315}	—	September 19, 2007	Kitt Peak	Spacewatch	MAS	580 m	MPC · JPL
862412	2014 QJ_{316}	—	July 25, 2014	Haleakala	Pan-STARRS 1	·	1.6 km	MPC · JPL
862413	2014 QP_{316}	—	July 28, 2014	Haleakala	Pan-STARRS 1	EOS	1.3 km	MPC · JPL
862414	2014 QQ_{316}	—	October 19, 2003	Kitt Peak	Spacewatch	·	740 m	MPC · JPL
862415	2014 QY_{316}	—	September 18, 2009	Mount Lemmon	Mount Lemmon Survey	·	1.6 km	MPC · JPL
862416	2014 QW_{317}	—	September 27, 2009	Kitt Peak	Spacewatch	·	1.3 km	MPC · JPL
862417	2014 QY_{320}	—	August 25, 2014	Haleakala	Pan-STARRS 1	VER	2.0 km	MPC · JPL
862418	2014 QN_{321}	—	August 25, 2014	Haleakala	Pan-STARRS 1	EOS	1.5 km	MPC · JPL
862419	2014 QW_{323}	—	October 12, 2010	Mount Lemmon	Mount Lemmon Survey	·	970 m	MPC · JPL
862420	2014 QD_{324}	—	September 17, 2010	Mount Lemmon	Mount Lemmon Survey	·	800 m	MPC · JPL
862421	2014 QP_{324}	—	July 30, 2014	Haleakala	Pan-STARRS 1	·	940 m	MPC · JPL
862422	2014 QX_{324}	—	August 25, 2014	Haleakala	Pan-STARRS 1	·	480 m	MPC · JPL
862423	2014 QP_{325}	—	August 25, 2014	Haleakala	Pan-STARRS 1	·	1.9 km	MPC · JPL
862424	2014 QB_{328}	—	August 25, 2014	Haleakala	Pan-STARRS 1	H	400 m	MPC · JPL
862425	2014 QQ_{329}	—	August 25, 2014	Haleakala	Pan-STARRS 1	·	1.7 km	MPC · JPL
862426	2014 QV_{329}	—	August 25, 2014	Haleakala	Pan-STARRS 1	EOS	1.5 km	MPC · JPL
862427	2014 QM_{330}	—	October 24, 2003	Kitt Peak	Spacewatch	·	710 m	MPC · JPL
862428	2014 QK_{331}	—	August 25, 2014	Haleakala	Pan-STARRS 1	·	1.9 km	MPC · JPL
862429	2014 QS_{331}	—	August 25, 2014	Haleakala	Pan-STARRS 1	·	870 m	MPC · JPL
862430	2014 QR_{332}	—	August 6, 2014	Haleakala	Pan-STARRS 1	H	410 m	MPC · JPL
862431	2014 QM_{333}	—	August 25, 2014	Haleakala	Pan-STARRS 1	·	920 m	MPC · JPL
862432	2014 QF_{334}	—	October 22, 2009	Mount Lemmon	Mount Lemmon Survey	·	1.5 km	MPC · JPL
862433	2014 QJ_{335}	—	September 18, 2003	Kitt Peak	Spacewatch	·	2.2 km	MPC · JPL
862434	2014 QB_{337}	—	August 18, 2014	Haleakala	Pan-STARRS 1	·	2.7 km	MPC · JPL
862435	2014 QC_{337}	—	July 28, 2014	Haleakala	Pan-STARRS 1	·	910 m	MPC · JPL
862436	2014 QY_{337}	—	November 10, 1999	Kitt Peak	Spacewatch	·	1.2 km	MPC · JPL
862437	2014 QX_{338}	—	October 16, 2009	Mount Lemmon	Mount Lemmon Survey	·	1.6 km	MPC · JPL
862438	2014 QA_{339}	—	August 14, 2014	Haleakala	Pan-STARRS 1	·	1.4 km	MPC · JPL
862439	2014 QO_{339}	—	July 1, 2014	Haleakala	Pan-STARRS 1	·	510 m	MPC · JPL
862440	2014 QP_{342}	—	July 27, 2014	ESA OGS	ESA OGS	DOR	1.8 km	MPC · JPL
862441	2014 QA_{345}	—	September 14, 2007	Mount Lemmon	Mount Lemmon Survey	NYS	580 m	MPC · JPL
862442	2014 QE_{347}	—	August 26, 2014	Haleakala	Pan-STARRS 1	LIX	2.8 km	MPC · JPL
862443	2014 QW_{349}	—	October 13, 2010	Mount Lemmon	Mount Lemmon Survey	·	1.3 km	MPC · JPL
862444	2014 QF_{350}	—	August 27, 2014	Haleakala	Pan-STARRS 1	·	1.5 km	MPC · JPL
862445	2014 QO_{350}	—	July 31, 2014	Haleakala	Pan-STARRS 1	MAS	570 m	MPC · JPL
862446	2014 QT_{350}	—	August 27, 2014	Haleakala	Pan-STARRS 1	VER	2.0 km	MPC · JPL
862447	2014 QX_{350}	—	May 13, 2010	Kitt Peak	Spacewatch	·	680 m	MPC · JPL
862448	2014 QD_{351}	—	November 11, 2010	Kitt Peak	Spacewatch	·	900 m	MPC · JPL
862449	2014 QV_{351}	—	August 27, 2014	Haleakala	Pan-STARRS 1	·	1.5 km	MPC · JPL
862450	2014 QP_{352}	—	September 21, 2003	Kitt Peak	Spacewatch	·	1.5 km	MPC · JPL
862451	2014 QL_{353}	—	September 5, 2010	Mount Lemmon	Mount Lemmon Survey	·	1.1 km	MPC · JPL
862452	2014 QB_{355}	—	December 1, 2003	Kitt Peak	Spacewatch	MAS	490 m	MPC · JPL
862453	2014 QD_{357}	—	August 27, 2014	Haleakala	Pan-STARRS 1	MAS	500 m	MPC · JPL
862454	2014 QB_{358}	—	March 13, 2013	Mount Lemmon	Mount Lemmon Survey	·	1.0 km	MPC · JPL
862455	2014 QC_{359}	—	August 27, 2014	Haleakala	Pan-STARRS 1	·	2.5 km	MPC · JPL
862456	2014 QD_{362}	—	October 10, 2007	Mount Lemmon	Mount Lemmon Survey	·	670 m	MPC · JPL
862457	2014 QV_{365}	—	October 14, 2009	Kitt Peak	Spacewatch	·	1.7 km	MPC · JPL
862458	2014 QX_{365}	—	August 23, 2014	Haleakala	Pan-STARRS 1	THB	2.1 km	MPC · JPL
862459	2014 QS_{368}	—	August 25, 2014	Haleakala	Pan-STARRS 1	·	1.8 km	MPC · JPL
862460	2014 QU_{368}	—	August 25, 2014	Haleakala	Pan-STARRS 1	·	2.6 km	MPC · JPL
862461	2014 QD_{370}	—	August 20, 2014	Haleakala	Pan-STARRS 1	·	710 m	MPC · JPL
862462	2014 QE_{370}	—	September 14, 2007	Mount Lemmon	Mount Lemmon Survey	NYS	840 m	MPC · JPL
862463	2014 QU_{370}	—	July 31, 2014	Haleakala	Pan-STARRS 1	·	2.0 km	MPC · JPL
862464	2014 QN_{371}	—	September 12, 2007	Mount Lemmon	Mount Lemmon Survey	·	560 m	MPC · JPL
862465	2014 QG_{372}	—	September 27, 2003	Kitt Peak	Spacewatch	·	850 m	MPC · JPL
862466	2014 QQ_{372}	—	August 27, 2014	Haleakala	Pan-STARRS 1	·	1.8 km	MPC · JPL
862467	2014 QZ_{372}	—	July 31, 2014	Haleakala	Pan-STARRS 1	·	530 m	MPC · JPL
862468	2014 QH_{373}	—	August 22, 2014	Haleakala	Pan-STARRS 1	·	540 m	MPC · JPL
862469	2014 QO_{373}	—	August 20, 2014	Haleakala	Pan-STARRS 1	V	460 m	MPC · JPL
862470	2014 QJ_{375}	—	January 8, 2011	Mount Lemmon	Mount Lemmon Survey	·	1.2 km	MPC · JPL
862471	2014 QD_{376}	—	July 30, 2014	Haleakala	Pan-STARRS 1	·	1.8 km	MPC · JPL
862472	2014 QR_{377}	—	August 27, 2014	Haleakala	Pan-STARRS 1	URS	1.8 km	MPC · JPL
862473	2014 QB_{379}	—	September 23, 2004	Kitt Peak	Spacewatch	·	450 m	MPC · JPL
862474	2014 QC_{379}	—	July 27, 2014	Haleakala	Pan-STARRS 1	·	460 m	MPC · JPL
862475	2014 QH_{379}	—	July 29, 2014	Haleakala	Pan-STARRS 1	·	960 m	MPC · JPL
862476	2014 QD_{381}	—	January 8, 2010	Mount Lemmon	Mount Lemmon Survey	·	1.4 km	MPC · JPL
862477	2014 QW_{381}	—	August 19, 2014	Haleakala	Pan-STARRS 1	·	800 m	MPC · JPL
862478	2014 QU_{382}	—	March 18, 2013	Mount Lemmon	Mount Lemmon Survey	·	550 m	MPC · JPL
862479	2014 QN_{383}	—	August 28, 2014	Haleakala	Pan-STARRS 1	·	950 m	MPC · JPL
862480	2014 QN_{384}	—	August 6, 2014	Haleakala	Pan-STARRS 1	·	1.7 km	MPC · JPL
862481	2014 QT_{385}	—	August 29, 2014	Mount Lemmon	Mount Lemmon Survey	·	2.4 km	MPC · JPL
862482	2014 QU_{385}	—	March 6, 2013	Haleakala	Pan-STARRS 1	H	530 m	MPC · JPL
862483	2014 QQ_{386}	—	August 29, 2014	Mount Lemmon	Mount Lemmon Survey	·	2.0 km	MPC · JPL
862484	2014 QG_{389}	—	August 22, 2014	Haleakala	Pan-STARRS 1	3:2 · SHU	3.6 km	MPC · JPL
862485	2014 QX_{392}	—	September 27, 2009	Kitt Peak	Spacewatch	·	1.6 km	MPC · JPL
862486	2014 QS_{393}	—	July 31, 2014	Haleakala	Pan-STARRS 1	·	1.8 km	MPC · JPL
862487	2014 QF_{395}	—	August 27, 2014	Haleakala	Pan-STARRS 1	VER	1.6 km	MPC · JPL
862488	2014 QN_{395}	—	December 1, 2010	Mount Lemmon	Mount Lemmon Survey	AEO	900 m	MPC · JPL
862489	2014 QS_{395}	—	August 27, 2014	Haleakala	Pan-STARRS 1	(2076)	530 m	MPC · JPL
862490	2014 QF_{399}	—	November 21, 2007	Mount Lemmon	Mount Lemmon Survey	3:2	3.6 km	MPC · JPL
862491	2014 QJ_{399}	—	August 19, 2014	Haleakala	Pan-STARRS 1	·	1.8 km	MPC · JPL
862492	2014 QO_{402}	—	August 28, 2014	Haleakala	Pan-STARRS 1	·	460 m	MPC · JPL
862493	2014 QR_{403}	—	August 28, 2014	Haleakala	Pan-STARRS 1	·	2.1 km	MPC · JPL
862494	2014 QB_{404}	—	August 28, 2014	Haleakala	Pan-STARRS 1	VER	1.8 km	MPC · JPL
862495	2014 QP_{404}	—	July 5, 2014	Haleakala	Pan-STARRS 1	·	640 m	MPC · JPL
862496	2014 QD_{406}	—	August 18, 2014	Haleakala	Pan-STARRS 1	3:2	3.3 km	MPC · JPL
862497	2014 QC_{407}	—	September 20, 1998	Kitt Peak	Spacewatch	·	2.1 km	MPC · JPL
862498	2014 QY_{407}	—	August 22, 2004	Kitt Peak	Spacewatch	·	430 m	MPC · JPL
862499	2014 QS_{408}	—	November 14, 2010	Kitt Peak	Spacewatch	MIS	1.8 km	MPC · JPL
862500	2014 QG_{412}	—	July 25, 2014	Haleakala	Pan-STARRS 1	·	1.2 km	MPC · JPL

== 862501–862600 ==
back to top

Designation			Discovery			Properties		Ref
Permanent	Provisional	Named after	Date	Site	Discoverer(s)	Category	Diam.	Ref
862501	2014 QP_{412}	—	September 27, 2009	Kitt Peak	Spacewatch	·	1.5 km	MPC · JPL
862502	2014 QA_{413}	—	August 30, 2014	Mount Lemmon	Mount Lemmon Survey	·	450 m	MPC · JPL
862503	2014 QC_{415}	—	September 15, 2007	Mount Lemmon	Mount Lemmon Survey	MAS	430 m	MPC · JPL
862504	2014 QO_{415}	—	July 30, 2014	Kitt Peak	Spacewatch	V	470 m	MPC · JPL
862505	2014 QT_{415}	—	August 20, 2014	Haleakala	Pan-STARRS 1	NYS	850 m	MPC · JPL
862506	2014 QF_{419}	—	October 4, 2007	Kitt Peak	Spacewatch	·	700 m	MPC · JPL
862507	2014 QL_{419}	—	April 12, 2013	Haleakala	Pan-STARRS 1	·	1.4 km	MPC · JPL
862508	2014 QB_{420}	—	August 20, 2014	Haleakala	Pan-STARRS 1	·	2.3 km	MPC · JPL
862509	2014 QD_{420}	—	July 31, 2014	Haleakala	Pan-STARRS 1	·	420 m	MPC · JPL
862510	2014 QQ_{420}	—	August 27, 2014	Haleakala	Pan-STARRS 1	·	2.0 km	MPC · JPL
862511	2014 QK_{421}	—	August 10, 2007	Kitt Peak	Spacewatch	·	500 m	MPC · JPL
862512	2014 QL_{422}	—	August 31, 2014	Mount Lemmon	Mount Lemmon Survey	·	850 m	MPC · JPL
862513	2014 QQ_{424}	—	August 31, 2014	Mount Lemmon	Mount Lemmon Survey	·	1.8 km	MPC · JPL
862514	2014 QX_{426}	—	August 31, 2014	Kitt Peak	Spacewatch	·	980 m	MPC · JPL
862515	2014 QO_{427}	—	April 12, 2005	Kitt Peak	Deep Ecliptic Survey	·	790 m	MPC · JPL
862516	2014 QU_{427}	—	September 10, 2010	Mount Lemmon	Mount Lemmon Survey	·	690 m	MPC · JPL
862517	2014 QG_{428}	—	November 2, 2011	Kitt Peak	Spacewatch	·	500 m	MPC · JPL
862518	2014 QT_{428}	—	January 28, 2011	Mount Lemmon	Mount Lemmon Survey	·	1.2 km	MPC · JPL
862519	2014 QG_{429}	—	July 7, 2014	Haleakala	Pan-STARRS 1	H	360 m	MPC · JPL
862520	2014 QK_{430}	—	October 23, 2009	Mount Lemmon	Mount Lemmon Survey	·	2.1 km	MPC · JPL
862521	2014 QO_{431}	—	August 31, 2014	Haleakala	Pan-STARRS 1	·	2.2 km	MPC · JPL
862522	2014 QC_{432}	—	October 17, 1998	Kitt Peak	Spacewatch	·	1.9 km	MPC · JPL
862523	2014 QH_{434}	—	July 28, 2005	Palomar	NEAT	·	1.1 km	MPC · JPL
862524	2014 QK_{434}	—	July 1, 2014	Haleakala	Pan-STARRS 1	APO · PHA	300 m	MPC · JPL
862525	2014 QF_{435}	—	October 19, 2003	Kitt Peak	Spacewatch	·	1.5 km	MPC · JPL
862526	2014 QK_{437}	—	August 19, 2014	Haleakala	Pan-STARRS 1	·	1.9 km	MPC · JPL
862527	2014 QR_{438}	—	September 3, 2010	Mount Lemmon	Mount Lemmon Survey	·	770 m	MPC · JPL
862528	2014 QJ_{442}	—	August 20, 2014	Haleakala	Pan-STARRS 1	H	300 m	MPC · JPL
862529	2014 QN_{442}	—	August 28, 2014	Haleakala	Pan-STARRS 1	H	430 m	MPC · JPL
862530	2014 QC_{443}	—	March 5, 2013	Haleakala	Pan-STARRS 1	H	320 m	MPC · JPL
862531	2014 QX_{444}	—	August 20, 2014	Haleakala	Pan-STARRS 1	·	1.7 km	MPC · JPL
862532	2014 QO_{446}	—	April 10, 2013	Haleakala	Pan-STARRS 1	·	1.7 km	MPC · JPL
862533	2014 QQ_{446}	—	August 27, 2014	Haleakala	Pan-STARRS 1	·	1.8 km	MPC · JPL
862534	2014 QW_{448}	—	August 20, 2014	Haleakala	Pan-STARRS 1	·	1.7 km	MPC · JPL
862535	2014 QX_{448}	—	August 20, 2014	Haleakala	Pan-STARRS 1	·	1.3 km	MPC · JPL
862536	2014 QG_{449}	—	August 20, 2014	Haleakala	Pan-STARRS 1	·	1.9 km	MPC · JPL
862537	2014 QT_{450}	—	August 22, 2014	Haleakala	Pan-STARRS 1	·	1.9 km	MPC · JPL
862538	2014 QC_{451}	—	April 22, 2007	Mount Lemmon	Mount Lemmon Survey	(1298)	2.1 km	MPC · JPL
862539	2014 QP_{453}	—	September 16, 2009	Mount Lemmon	Mount Lemmon Survey	·	1.8 km	MPC · JPL
862540	2014 QX_{453}	—	October 23, 2009	Mount Lemmon	Mount Lemmon Survey	·	2.1 km	MPC · JPL
862541	2014 QD_{454}	—	August 27, 2014	Haleakala	Pan-STARRS 1	·	1.7 km	MPC · JPL
862542	2014 QY_{454}	—	November 24, 2009	Mount Lemmon	Mount Lemmon Survey	·	1.5 km	MPC · JPL
862543	2014 QL_{455}	—	August 23, 2014	Haleakala	Pan-STARRS 1	VER	1.9 km	MPC · JPL
862544	2014 QQ_{455}	—	October 23, 2009	Mount Lemmon	Mount Lemmon Survey	·	1.4 km	MPC · JPL
862545	2014 QJ_{456}	—	August 31, 2014	Haleakala	Pan-STARRS 1	·	1.8 km	MPC · JPL
862546	2014 QG_{457}	—	August 23, 2014	Haleakala	Pan-STARRS 1	EOS	1.4 km	MPC · JPL
862547	2014 QY_{457}	—	August 31, 2014	Mount Lemmon	Mount Lemmon Survey	·	1.9 km	MPC · JPL
862548	2014 QD_{458}	—	August 31, 2014	Haleakala	Pan-STARRS 1	·	1.7 km	MPC · JPL
862549	2014 QP_{459}	—	August 20, 2014	Haleakala	Pan-STARRS 1	·	2.6 km	MPC · JPL
862550	2014 QW_{459}	—	August 20, 2014	Haleakala	Pan-STARRS 1	·	1.7 km	MPC · JPL
862551	2014 QY_{459}	—	February 1, 2006	Kitt Peak	Spacewatch	·	2.4 km	MPC · JPL
862552	2014 QU_{460}	—	August 20, 2014	Haleakala	Pan-STARRS 1	·	2.1 km	MPC · JPL
862553	2014 QC_{462}	—	August 22, 2014	Haleakala	Pan-STARRS 1	·	1.6 km	MPC · JPL
862554	2014 QQ_{462}	—	August 22, 2014	Haleakala	Pan-STARRS 1	·	2.2 km	MPC · JPL
862555	2014 QS_{462}	—	August 22, 2014	Haleakala	Pan-STARRS 1	·	1.6 km	MPC · JPL
862556	2014 QE_{463}	—	August 22, 2014	Haleakala	Pan-STARRS 1	·	2.0 km	MPC · JPL
862557	2014 QG_{464}	—	October 13, 2010	Mount Lemmon	Mount Lemmon Survey	·	1.1 km	MPC · JPL
862558	2014 QX_{464}	—	August 23, 2014	Haleakala	Pan-STARRS 1	·	2.0 km	MPC · JPL
862559	2014 QZ_{464}	—	August 23, 2014	Haleakala	Pan-STARRS 1	·	2.0 km	MPC · JPL
862560	2014 QC_{465}	—	August 23, 2014	Haleakala	Pan-STARRS 1	·	2.1 km	MPC · JPL
862561	2014 QM_{465}	—	August 23, 2014	Haleakala	Pan-STARRS 1	·	2.1 km	MPC · JPL
862562	2014 QB_{466}	—	August 25, 2014	Haleakala	Pan-STARRS 1	·	1.8 km	MPC · JPL
862563	2014 QY_{466}	—	February 25, 2011	Mount Lemmon	Mount Lemmon Survey	EOS	1.3 km	MPC · JPL
862564	2014 QX_{467}	—	August 27, 2014	Haleakala	Pan-STARRS 1	·	1.7 km	MPC · JPL
862565	2014 QR_{469}	—	September 16, 2010	Mount Lemmon	Mount Lemmon Survey	·	1.2 km	MPC · JPL
862566	2014 QT_{469}	—	August 28, 2014	Haleakala	Pan-STARRS 1	V	490 m	MPC · JPL
862567	2014 QA_{470}	—	August 28, 2014	Haleakala	Pan-STARRS 1	·	1.3 km	MPC · JPL
862568	2014 QE_{470}	—	August 28, 2014	Haleakala	Pan-STARRS 1	·	790 m	MPC · JPL
862569	2014 QY_{470}	—	August 28, 2014	Haleakala	Pan-STARRS 1	PHO	690 m	MPC · JPL
862570	2014 QG_{471}	—	August 29, 2014	Kitt Peak	Spacewatch	THM	1.5 km	MPC · JPL
862571	2014 QC_{472}	—	August 30, 2014	Haleakala	Pan-STARRS 1	·	2.4 km	MPC · JPL
862572	2014 QK_{472}	—	August 31, 2014	Kitt Peak	Spacewatch	·	1.2 km	MPC · JPL
862573	2014 QB_{473}	—	August 31, 2014	Haleakala	Pan-STARRS 1	EOS	1.2 km	MPC · JPL
862574	2014 QS_{477}	—	September 5, 2007	Mount Lemmon	Mount Lemmon Survey	MAS	460 m	MPC · JPL
862575	2014 QQ_{478}	—	August 20, 2014	Haleakala	Pan-STARRS 1	EOS	1.3 km	MPC · JPL
862576	2014 QG_{479}	—	February 8, 2013	Kitt Peak	Spacewatch	·	850 m	MPC · JPL
862577	2014 QB_{481}	—	September 16, 2006	Kitt Peak	Spacewatch	·	630 m	MPC · JPL
862578	2014 QH_{481}	—	January 26, 2011	Mount Lemmon	Mount Lemmon Survey	·	1.8 km	MPC · JPL
862579	2014 QR_{481}	—	August 25, 2003	Cerro Tololo	Deep Ecliptic Survey	THM	1.4 km	MPC · JPL
862580	2014 QN_{482}	—	September 12, 2005	Kitt Peak	Spacewatch	PAD	1.0 km	MPC · JPL
862581	2014 QW_{482}	—	August 20, 2014	Haleakala	Pan-STARRS 1	·	2.1 km	MPC · JPL
862582	2014 QB_{483}	—	August 20, 2014	Haleakala	Pan-STARRS 1	V	400 m	MPC · JPL
862583	2014 QL_{484}	—	August 20, 2014	Haleakala	Pan-STARRS 1	MAS	450 m	MPC · JPL
862584	2014 QM_{484}	—	August 20, 2014	Haleakala	Pan-STARRS 1	NYS	700 m	MPC · JPL
862585	2014 QV_{486}	—	April 2, 2009	Mount Lemmon	Mount Lemmon Survey	·	1.3 km	MPC · JPL
862586	2014 QQ_{488}	—	August 22, 2014	Haleakala	Pan-STARRS 1	·	1.7 km	MPC · JPL
862587	2014 QF_{489}	—	August 3, 2014	Haleakala	Pan-STARRS 1	·	2.2 km	MPC · JPL
862588	2014 QP_{489}	—	September 26, 2003	Sacramento Peak	SDSS	THM	1.5 km	MPC · JPL
862589	2014 QG_{490}	—	August 22, 2014	Haleakala	Pan-STARRS 1	·	1.5 km	MPC · JPL
862590	2014 QM_{490}	—	July 31, 2014	Haleakala	Pan-STARRS 1	·	1.9 km	MPC · JPL
862591	2014 QE_{492}	—	August 23, 2014	Haleakala	Pan-STARRS 1	·	2.2 km	MPC · JPL
862592	2014 QK_{492}	—	August 25, 2014	Kitt Peak	Spacewatch	GEF	1.1 km	MPC · JPL
862593	2014 QS_{493}	—	October 10, 2007	Mount Lemmon	Mount Lemmon Survey	·	620 m	MPC · JPL
862594	2014 QJ_{494}	—	October 9, 2007	Kitt Peak	Spacewatch	NYS	940 m	MPC · JPL
862595	2014 QU_{494}	—	March 19, 2013	Haleakala	Pan-STARRS 1	·	1.1 km	MPC · JPL
862596	2014 QH_{495}	—	August 30, 2014	Haleakala	Pan-STARRS 1	PHO	690 m	MPC · JPL
862597	2014 QO_{495}	—	August 27, 2014	Haleakala	Pan-STARRS 1	·	470 m	MPC · JPL
862598	2014 QP_{495}	—	August 27, 2014	Haleakala	Pan-STARRS 1	MAS	440 m	MPC · JPL
862599	2014 QZ_{495}	—	August 25, 2014	Haleakala	Pan-STARRS 1	·	850 m	MPC · JPL
862600	2014 QF_{496}	—	August 20, 2014	Haleakala	Pan-STARRS 1	·	570 m	MPC · JPL

== 862601–862700 ==
back to top

Designation			Discovery			Properties		Ref
Permanent	Provisional	Named after	Date	Site	Discoverer(s)	Category	Diam.	Ref
862601	2014 QL_{497}	—	August 25, 2014	Haleakala	Pan-STARRS 1	·	780 m	MPC · JPL
862602	2014 QN_{497}	—	September 26, 2003	Sacramento Peak	SDSS	·	900 m	MPC · JPL
862603	2014 QQ_{497}	—	August 28, 2014	Haleakala	Pan-STARRS 1	·	2.2 km	MPC · JPL
862604	2014 QS_{497}	—	August 28, 2014	Haleakala	Pan-STARRS 1	·	1.6 km	MPC · JPL
862605	2014 QY_{497}	—	August 23, 2014	Haleakala	Pan-STARRS 1	NYS	660 m	MPC · JPL
862606	2014 QA_{498}	—	August 20, 2014	Haleakala	Pan-STARRS 1	·	560 m	MPC · JPL
862607	2014 QF_{498}	—	August 27, 2014	Haleakala	Pan-STARRS 1	·	760 m	MPC · JPL
862608	2014 QK_{498}	—	June 29, 2014	Mount Lemmon	Mount Lemmon Survey	EOS	1.2 km	MPC · JPL
862609	2014 QY_{498}	—	August 28, 2014	Haleakala	Pan-STARRS 1	V	510 m	MPC · JPL
862610	2014 QE_{499}	—	August 22, 2014	Haleakala	Pan-STARRS 1	·	550 m	MPC · JPL
862611	2014 QL_{499}	—	December 18, 2015	Mount Lemmon	Mount Lemmon Survey	·	2.1 km	MPC · JPL
862612	2014 QP_{499}	—	August 20, 2014	Haleakala	Pan-STARRS 1	·	760 m	MPC · JPL
862613	2014 QQ_{499}	—	August 26, 2014	Haleakala	Pan-STARRS 1	·	750 m	MPC · JPL
862614	2014 QV_{499}	—	August 25, 2014	Haleakala	Pan-STARRS 1	·	1.9 km	MPC · JPL
862615	2014 QB_{500}	—	August 30, 2014	Mount Lemmon	Mount Lemmon Survey	·	2.5 km	MPC · JPL
862616	2014 QM_{500}	—	August 18, 2014	Haleakala	Pan-STARRS 1	·	1.4 km	MPC · JPL
862617	2014 QP_{500}	—	August 20, 2014	Haleakala	Pan-STARRS 1	TIR	2.0 km	MPC · JPL
862618	2014 QR_{500}	—	August 25, 2014	Haleakala	Pan-STARRS 1	·	2.2 km	MPC · JPL
862619	2014 QS_{500}	—	August 28, 2014	Haleakala	Pan-STARRS 1	·	800 m	MPC · JPL
862620	2014 QU_{500}	—	August 27, 2014	Haleakala	Pan-STARRS 1	·	2.4 km	MPC · JPL
862621	2014 QB_{501}	—	August 25, 2014	Haleakala	Pan-STARRS 1	·	1.7 km	MPC · JPL
862622	2014 QE_{501}	—	August 22, 2014	Haleakala	Pan-STARRS 1	·	2.0 km	MPC · JPL
862623	2014 QX_{501}	—	August 30, 2014	Kitt Peak	Spacewatch	·	470 m	MPC · JPL
862624	2014 QB_{503}	—	August 25, 2014	Haleakala	Pan-STARRS 1	·	910 m	MPC · JPL
862625	2014 QT_{504}	—	August 23, 2014	Haleakala	Pan-STARRS 1	·	1.9 km	MPC · JPL
862626	2014 QZ_{504}	—	August 30, 2014	Haleakala	Pan-STARRS 1	·	2.0 km	MPC · JPL
862627	2014 QN_{505}	—	August 28, 2014	Haleakala	Pan-STARRS 1	·	960 m	MPC · JPL
862628	2014 QZ_{505}	—	August 31, 2014	Haleakala	Pan-STARRS 1	·	2.5 km	MPC · JPL
862629	2014 QG_{506}	—	August 29, 2014	Haleakala	Pan-STARRS 1	·	2.5 km	MPC · JPL
862630	2014 QL_{506}	—	August 27, 2014	Haleakala	Pan-STARRS 1	THM	1.4 km	MPC · JPL
862631	2014 QO_{506}	—	August 28, 2014	Haleakala	Pan-STARRS 1	·	1.6 km	MPC · JPL
862632	2014 QV_{506}	—	August 23, 2014	Haleakala	Pan-STARRS 1	·	690 m	MPC · JPL
862633	2014 QA_{507}	—	August 31, 2014	Catalina	CSS	·	710 m	MPC · JPL
862634	2014 QV_{507}	—	January 29, 2017	Haleakala	Pan-STARRS 1	EOS	1.5 km	MPC · JPL
862635	2014 QH_{509}	—	August 4, 2014	Haleakala	Pan-STARRS 1	·	1.5 km	MPC · JPL
862636	2014 QJ_{510}	—	August 28, 2014	Haleakala	Pan-STARRS 1	·	540 m	MPC · JPL
862637	2014 QL_{510}	—	August 27, 2014	Haleakala	Pan-STARRS 1	TIR	1.6 km	MPC · JPL
862638	2014 QQ_{510}	—	August 20, 2014	Haleakala	Pan-STARRS 1	·	710 m	MPC · JPL
862639	2014 QE_{511}	—	August 30, 2014	Mayhill-ISON	L. Elenin	·	1.9 km	MPC · JPL
862640	2014 QF_{511}	—	August 19, 2014	Haleakala	Pan-STARRS 1	EOS	1.4 km	MPC · JPL
862641	2014 QO_{511}	—	August 25, 2014	Haleakala	Pan-STARRS 1	·	1.8 km	MPC · JPL
862642	2014 QR_{511}	—	September 20, 2008	Mount Lemmon	Mount Lemmon Survey	·	2.4 km	MPC · JPL
862643	2014 QU_{511}	—	August 27, 2014	Haleakala	Pan-STARRS 1	·	2.1 km	MPC · JPL
862644	2014 QW_{511}	—	December 9, 2015	Haleakala	Pan-STARRS 1	·	2.1 km	MPC · JPL
862645	2014 QA_{512}	—	August 23, 2014	Haleakala	Pan-STARRS 1	·	2.1 km	MPC · JPL
862646	2014 QD_{512}	—	August 31, 2014	Kitt Peak	Spacewatch	PHO	560 m	MPC · JPL
862647	2014 QQ_{512}	—	August 18, 2014	Haleakala	Pan-STARRS 1	·	1.8 km	MPC · JPL
862648	2014 QR_{512}	—	August 27, 2014	Haleakala	Pan-STARRS 1	·	2.0 km	MPC · JPL
862649	2014 QX_{512}	—	August 31, 2014	Haleakala	Pan-STARRS 1	EOS	1.2 km	MPC · JPL
862650	2014 QW_{513}	—	August 22, 2014	Haleakala	Pan-STARRS 1	·	1.5 km	MPC · JPL
862651	2014 QE_{514}	—	August 25, 2014	Haleakala	Pan-STARRS 1	·	2.0 km	MPC · JPL
862652	2014 QV_{514}	—	August 31, 2014	Haleakala	Pan-STARRS 1	·	2.3 km	MPC · JPL
862653	2014 QC_{515}	—	August 25, 2014	Haleakala	Pan-STARRS 1	·	2.0 km	MPC · JPL
862654	2014 QO_{515}	—	August 22, 2014	Haleakala	Pan-STARRS 1	·	1.8 km	MPC · JPL
862655	2014 QQ_{515}	—	August 23, 2014	Haleakala	Pan-STARRS 1	T_{j} (2.98)	1.9 km	MPC · JPL
862656	2014 QA_{517}	—	August 31, 2014	Haleakala	Pan-STARRS 1	·	2.0 km	MPC · JPL
862657	2014 QM_{518}	—	August 25, 2014	Haleakala	Pan-STARRS 1	·	1.9 km	MPC · JPL
862658	2014 QN_{518}	—	August 20, 2014	Haleakala	Pan-STARRS 1	·	1.3 km	MPC · JPL
862659	2014 QQ_{518}	—	August 27, 2014	Haleakala	Pan-STARRS 1	·	710 m	MPC · JPL
862660	2014 QU_{518}	—	August 20, 2014	Haleakala	Pan-STARRS 1	KOR	980 m	MPC · JPL
862661	2014 QB_{519}	—	July 25, 2014	Haleakala	Pan-STARRS 1	·	1.2 km	MPC · JPL
862662	2014 QL_{519}	—	August 27, 2014	Haleakala	Pan-STARRS 1	·	1.6 km	MPC · JPL
862663	2014 QO_{520}	—	August 29, 2014	Haleakala	Pan-STARRS 1	·	1.5 km	MPC · JPL
862664	2014 QF_{521}	—	August 26, 2014	Haleakala	Pan-STARRS 1	·	1.2 km	MPC · JPL
862665	2014 QN_{521}	—	October 14, 2009	Mount Lemmon	Mount Lemmon Survey	·	1.7 km	MPC · JPL
862666	2014 QP_{522}	—	August 31, 2014	Haleakala	Pan-STARRS 1	·	700 m	MPC · JPL
862667	2014 QT_{522}	—	August 20, 2014	Haleakala	Pan-STARRS 1	·	1.1 km	MPC · JPL
862668	2014 QX_{522}	—	August 20, 2014	Haleakala	Pan-STARRS 1	V	490 m	MPC · JPL
862669	2014 QC_{523}	—	August 27, 2014	Haleakala	Pan-STARRS 1	·	930 m	MPC · JPL
862670	2014 QE_{523}	—	August 22, 2014	Haleakala	Pan-STARRS 1	·	1.2 km	MPC · JPL
862671	2014 QV_{523}	—	August 28, 2014	Haleakala	Pan-STARRS 1	·	690 m	MPC · JPL
862672	2014 QY_{523}	—	August 22, 2014	Haleakala	Pan-STARRS 1	EOS	1.2 km	MPC · JPL
862673	2014 QC_{524}	—	August 20, 2014	Haleakala	Pan-STARRS 1	·	490 m	MPC · JPL
862674	2014 QM_{524}	—	August 31, 2014	Haleakala	Pan-STARRS 1	·	1.0 km	MPC · JPL
862675	2014 QP_{524}	—	August 20, 2014	Haleakala	Pan-STARRS 1	·	730 m	MPC · JPL
862676	2014 QQ_{524}	—	August 25, 2014	Haleakala	Pan-STARRS 1	·	1.3 km	MPC · JPL
862677	2014 QU_{524}	—	August 27, 2014	Haleakala	Pan-STARRS 1	·	2.0 km	MPC · JPL
862678	2014 QA_{525}	—	August 23, 2014	Haleakala	Pan-STARRS 1	EOS	1.3 km	MPC · JPL
862679	2014 QC_{525}	—	August 21, 2014	Haleakala	Pan-STARRS 1	·	2.0 km	MPC · JPL
862680	2014 QD_{525}	—	August 31, 2014	Kitt Peak	Spacewatch	·	2.9 km	MPC · JPL
862681	2014 QJ_{525}	—	August 27, 2014	Haleakala	Pan-STARRS 1	·	1.6 km	MPC · JPL
862682	2014 QQ_{526}	—	August 25, 2014	Haleakala	Pan-STARRS 1	·	560 m	MPC · JPL
862683	2014 QZ_{526}	—	August 28, 2014	Haleakala	Pan-STARRS 1	·	890 m	MPC · JPL
862684	2014 QF_{527}	—	August 27, 2014	Haleakala	Pan-STARRS 1	·	540 m	MPC · JPL
862685	2014 QJ_{527}	—	August 30, 2014	Kitt Peak	Spacewatch	·	470 m	MPC · JPL
862686	2014 QU_{528}	—	August 22, 2014	Haleakala	Pan-STARRS 1	KOR	1.1 km	MPC · JPL
862687	2014 QA_{529}	—	August 20, 2014	Haleakala	Pan-STARRS 1	·	1.4 km	MPC · JPL
862688	2014 QF_{529}	—	August 26, 2014	Haleakala	Pan-STARRS 1	·	720 m	MPC · JPL
862689	2014 QH_{529}	—	August 20, 2014	Haleakala	Pan-STARRS 1	EOS	1.4 km	MPC · JPL
862690	2014 QN_{529}	—	August 25, 2014	Haleakala	Pan-STARRS 1	·	2.3 km	MPC · JPL
862691	2014 QJ_{530}	—	August 27, 2014	Haleakala	Pan-STARRS 1	·	2.2 km	MPC · JPL
862692	2014 QK_{531}	—	August 28, 2014	Haleakala	Pan-STARRS 1	·	690 m	MPC · JPL
862693	2014 QO_{531}	—	August 20, 2014	Haleakala	Pan-STARRS 1	EOS	1.4 km	MPC · JPL
862694	2014 QR_{531}	—	August 23, 2014	Haleakala	Pan-STARRS 1	·	2.0 km	MPC · JPL
862695	2014 QM_{532}	—	August 28, 2014	Kitt Peak	Spacewatch	·	2.2 km	MPC · JPL
862696	2014 QC_{533}	—	August 28, 2014	Haleakala	Pan-STARRS 1	·	2.1 km	MPC · JPL
862697	2014 QG_{533}	—	August 28, 2014	Haleakala	Pan-STARRS 1	·	1.5 km	MPC · JPL
862698	2014 QG_{534}	—	August 22, 2014	Haleakala	Pan-STARRS 1	·	1.7 km	MPC · JPL
862699	2014 QJ_{534}	—	August 23, 2014	Haleakala	Pan-STARRS 1	·	1.6 km	MPC · JPL
862700	2014 QK_{534}	—	August 25, 2014	Haleakala	Pan-STARRS 1	·	2.2 km	MPC · JPL

== 862701–862800 ==
back to top

Designation			Discovery			Properties		Ref
Permanent	Provisional	Named after	Date	Site	Discoverer(s)	Category	Diam.	Ref
862701	2014 QM_{534}	—	August 28, 2014	Haleakala	Pan-STARRS 1	·	1.8 km	MPC · JPL
862702	2014 QG_{535}	—	August 20, 2014	Haleakala	Pan-STARRS 1	·	2.1 km	MPC · JPL
862703	2014 QM_{535}	—	August 28, 2014	Haleakala	Pan-STARRS 1	·	1.6 km	MPC · JPL
862704	2014 QB_{536}	—	August 27, 2014	Haleakala	Pan-STARRS 1	·	2.2 km	MPC · JPL
862705	2014 QV_{536}	—	August 28, 2014	Haleakala	Pan-STARRS 1	·	1.2 km	MPC · JPL
862706	2014 QX_{536}	—	August 26, 2014	Haleakala	Pan-STARRS 1	·	2.1 km	MPC · JPL
862707	2014 QE_{537}	—	August 31, 2014	Haleakala	Pan-STARRS 1	EUP	2.0 km	MPC · JPL
862708	2014 QJ_{537}	—	August 27, 2014	Haleakala	Pan-STARRS 1	·	2.0 km	MPC · JPL
862709	2014 QL_{537}	—	August 23, 2014	Haleakala	Pan-STARRS 1	H	290 m	MPC · JPL
862710	2014 QS_{537}	—	August 20, 2014	Haleakala	Pan-STARRS 1	·	1.8 km	MPC · JPL
862711	2014 QU_{537}	—	August 20, 2014	Haleakala	Pan-STARRS 1	·	1.8 km	MPC · JPL
862712	2014 QD_{538}	—	August 27, 2014	Haleakala	Pan-STARRS 1	·	2.3 km	MPC · JPL
862713	2014 QJ_{538}	—	August 28, 2014	Haleakala	Pan-STARRS 1	·	1.3 km	MPC · JPL
862714	2014 QP_{538}	—	August 25, 2014	Haleakala	Pan-STARRS 1	·	1.9 km	MPC · JPL
862715	2014 QR_{538}	—	August 27, 2014	Haleakala	Pan-STARRS 1	·	1.9 km	MPC · JPL
862716	2014 QX_{538}	—	August 19, 2014	Haleakala	Pan-STARRS 1	·	1.9 km	MPC · JPL
862717	2014 QA_{539}	—	August 25, 2014	Haleakala	Pan-STARRS 1	·	1.8 km	MPC · JPL
862718	2014 QB_{539}	—	August 28, 2014	Haleakala	Pan-STARRS 1	·	1.8 km	MPC · JPL
862719	2014 QJ_{540}	—	August 19, 2014	Haleakala	Pan-STARRS 1	EOS	1.2 km	MPC · JPL
862720	2014 QR_{540}	—	August 31, 2014	Haleakala	Pan-STARRS 1	EOS	1.4 km	MPC · JPL
862721	2014 QZ_{540}	—	August 22, 2014	Haleakala	Pan-STARRS 1	·	2.1 km	MPC · JPL
862722	2014 QA_{541}	—	August 24, 2014	Calar Alto-CASADO	Mottola, S., Hellmich, S.	VER	2.0 km	MPC · JPL
862723	2014 QM_{544}	—	August 23, 2014	Haleakala	Pan-STARRS 1	EOS	1.3 km	MPC · JPL
862724	2014 QV_{544}	—	August 23, 2014	Haleakala	Pan-STARRS 1	·	780 m	MPC · JPL
862725	2014 QH_{545}	—	August 25, 2014	Haleakala	Pan-STARRS 1	MAS	470 m	MPC · JPL
862726	2014 QQ_{546}	—	August 23, 2014	Haleakala	Pan-STARRS 1	·	1.9 km	MPC · JPL
862727	2014 QT_{547}	—	August 28, 2014	Haleakala	Pan-STARRS 1	·	1.5 km	MPC · JPL
862728	2014 QG_{548}	—	August 23, 2014	Haleakala	Pan-STARRS 1	EOS	1.4 km	MPC · JPL
862729	2014 QA_{550}	—	August 29, 2014	Kitt Peak	Spacewatch	·	720 m	MPC · JPL
862730	2014 QB_{550}	—	August 22, 2014	Haleakala	Pan-STARRS 1	·	1.8 km	MPC · JPL
862731	2014 QV_{551}	—	August 22, 2014	Haleakala	Pan-STARRS 1	·	710 m	MPC · JPL
862732	2014 QF_{552}	—	August 18, 2014	Haleakala	Pan-STARRS 1	URS	2.0 km	MPC · JPL
862733	2014 QE_{553}	—	August 20, 2014	Haleakala	Pan-STARRS 1	·	790 m	MPC · JPL
862734	2014 QH_{553}	—	August 27, 2014	Haleakala	Pan-STARRS 1	V	480 m	MPC · JPL
862735	2014 QZ_{554}	—	August 22, 2014	Haleakala	Pan-STARRS 1	·	2.1 km	MPC · JPL
862736	2014 QH_{555}	—	August 31, 2014	Haleakala	Pan-STARRS 1	·	960 m	MPC · JPL
862737	2014 QS_{555}	—	August 27, 2014	Haleakala	Pan-STARRS 1	·	640 m	MPC · JPL
862738	2014 QT_{555}	—	August 22, 2014	Haleakala	Pan-STARRS 1	·	950 m	MPC · JPL
862739	2014 QE_{556}	—	August 28, 2014	Haleakala	Pan-STARRS 1	·	700 m	MPC · JPL
862740	2014 QQ_{557}	—	August 23, 2014	Haleakala	Pan-STARRS 1	PHO	580 m	MPC · JPL
862741	2014 QE_{558}	—	August 27, 2014	Haleakala	Pan-STARRS 1	·	640 m	MPC · JPL
862742	2014 QU_{559}	—	August 27, 2014	Haleakala	Pan-STARRS 1	·	550 m	MPC · JPL
862743	2014 QH_{560}	—	August 30, 2014	Haleakala	Pan-STARRS 1	·	2.2 km	MPC · JPL
862744	2014 QP_{560}	—	August 31, 2014	Haleakala	Pan-STARRS 1	·	760 m	MPC · JPL
862745	2014 QB_{564}	—	August 27, 2014	Haleakala	Pan-STARRS 1	·	2.2 km	MPC · JPL
862746	2014 QA_{568}	—	August 28, 2014	Haleakala	Pan-STARRS 1	·	1.7 km	MPC · JPL
862747	2014 QJ_{568}	—	August 25, 2014	Haleakala	Pan-STARRS 1	·	880 m	MPC · JPL
862748	2014 QL_{568}	—	August 23, 2014	Haleakala	Pan-STARRS 1	MAR	610 m	MPC · JPL
862749	2014 QN_{568}	—	August 20, 2014	Haleakala	Pan-STARRS 1	V	370 m	MPC · JPL
862750	2014 QK_{569}	—	August 30, 2014	Kitt Peak	Spacewatch	·	620 m	MPC · JPL
862751	2014 QQ_{571}	—	September 10, 2007	Kitt Peak	Spacewatch	·	650 m	MPC · JPL
862752	2014 QU_{571}	—	August 20, 2014	Haleakala	Pan-STARRS 1	·	2.2 km	MPC · JPL
862753	2014 QT_{572}	—	August 22, 2014	Haleakala	Pan-STARRS 1	MAS	460 m	MPC · JPL
862754	2014 QF_{573}	—	August 28, 2014	Haleakala	Pan-STARRS 1	EOS	1.3 km	MPC · JPL
862755	2014 QH_{573}	—	August 25, 2014	Haleakala	Pan-STARRS 1	·	2.0 km	MPC · JPL
862756	2014 QN_{573}	—	August 25, 2014	Calar Alto-CASADO	Mottola, S., Hellmich, S.	TIR	1.5 km	MPC · JPL
862757	2014 QK_{574}	—	August 22, 2014	Haleakala	Pan-STARRS 1	H	410 m	MPC · JPL
862758	2014 QH_{575}	—	August 28, 2014	Haleakala	Pan-STARRS 1	·	2.2 km	MPC · JPL
862759	2014 QU_{575}	—	August 25, 2014	Haleakala	Pan-STARRS 1	V	500 m	MPC · JPL
862760	2014 QP_{576}	—	August 27, 2014	Haleakala	Pan-STARRS 1	·	1.8 km	MPC · JPL
862761	2014 QE_{579}	—	August 29, 2014	Haleakala	Pan-STARRS 1	H	350 m	MPC · JPL
862762	2014 QX_{582}	—	August 28, 2014	Kitt Peak	Spacewatch	·	2.2 km	MPC · JPL
862763	2014 QF_{584}	—	August 22, 2014	Haleakala	Pan-STARRS 1	·	1.0 km	MPC · JPL
862764	2014 QK_{584}	—	August 23, 2014	Haleakala	Pan-STARRS 1	·	1.8 km	MPC · JPL
862765	2014 QP_{584}	—	August 23, 2014	Haleakala	Pan-STARRS 1	·	1.8 km	MPC · JPL
862766	2014 QP_{585}	—	August 22, 2014	Haleakala	Pan-STARRS 1	·	2.2 km	MPC · JPL
862767	2014 QS_{585}	—	August 27, 2014	Haleakala	Pan-STARRS 1	HYG	1.7 km	MPC · JPL
862768	2014 QW_{585}	—	August 27, 2014	Haleakala	Pan-STARRS 1	·	1.8 km	MPC · JPL
862769	2014 QE_{586}	—	August 20, 2014	Haleakala	Pan-STARRS 1	·	1.5 km	MPC · JPL
862770	2014 QH_{590}	—	August 23, 2014	Haleakala	Pan-STARRS 1	EOS	1.3 km	MPC · JPL
862771	2014 QX_{590}	—	August 28, 2014	Haleakala	Pan-STARRS 1	·	1.9 km	MPC · JPL
862772	2014 QC_{591}	—	August 28, 2014	Haleakala	Pan-STARRS 1	·	1.2 km	MPC · JPL
862773	2014 QD_{593}	—	August 29, 2014	Mount Lemmon	Mount Lemmon Survey	·	1.5 km	MPC · JPL
862774	2014 QK_{598}	—	August 27, 2014	Haleakala	Pan-STARRS 1	V	470 m	MPC · JPL
862775	2014 QZ_{600}	—	August 31, 2014	Haleakala	Pan-STARRS 1	H	330 m	MPC · JPL
862776	2014 QH_{601}	—	August 20, 2014	Haleakala	Pan-STARRS 1	·	830 m	MPC · JPL
862777	2014 QS_{604}	—	March 15, 2012	Mount Lemmon	Mount Lemmon Survey	·	1.9 km	MPC · JPL
862778	2014 QW_{604}	—	August 20, 2014	Haleakala	Pan-STARRS 1	·	1.7 km	MPC · JPL
862779	2014 QD_{605}	—	August 28, 2014	Haleakala	Pan-STARRS 1	·	2.0 km	MPC · JPL
862780	2014 RG_{3}	—	August 20, 2014	Haleakala	Pan-STARRS 1	·	850 m	MPC · JPL
862781	2014 RF_{4}	—	November 9, 2004	Mauna Kea	Veillet, C.	·	1.9 km	MPC · JPL
862782	2014 RX_{5}	—	November 11, 2004	Kitt Peak	Spacewatch	·	1.3 km	MPC · JPL
862783	2014 RD_{7}	—	October 18, 2009	Mount Lemmon	Mount Lemmon Survey	THM	1.4 km	MPC · JPL
862784	2014 RH_{7}	—	October 18, 2007	Kitt Peak	Spacewatch	·	730 m	MPC · JPL
862785	2014 RR_{7}	—	July 25, 2014	Haleakala	Pan-STARRS 1	·	2.1 km	MPC · JPL
862786	2014 RD_{8}	—	August 3, 2014	Haleakala	Pan-STARRS 1	·	1.9 km	MPC · JPL
862787	2014 RN_{9}	—	September 2, 2014	Haleakala	Pan-STARRS 1	·	520 m	MPC · JPL
862788	2014 RO_{9}	—	October 24, 2009	Kitt Peak	Spacewatch	·	1.9 km	MPC · JPL
862789	2014 RW_{10}	—	October 1, 2003	Kitt Peak	Spacewatch	·	1.9 km	MPC · JPL
862790	2014 RB_{11}	—	August 27, 2014	Haleakala	Pan-STARRS 1	THM	1.6 km	MPC · JPL
862791	2014 RD_{13}	—	September 5, 2014	WISE	WISE	T_{j} (2.92)	1.9 km	MPC · JPL
862792	2014 RJ_{13}	—	November 27, 2009	Kitt Peak	Spacewatch	·	2.3 km	MPC · JPL
862793	2014 RE_{14}	—	August 18, 2014	Haleakala	Pan-STARRS 1	V	400 m	MPC · JPL
862794	2014 RL_{14}	—	September 1, 2014	Mount Lemmon	Mount Lemmon Survey	·	530 m	MPC · JPL
862795	2014 RT_{14}	—	October 10, 2007	Mount Lemmon	Mount Lemmon Survey	·	760 m	MPC · JPL
862796	2014 RU_{16}	—	August 28, 2014	Haleakala	Pan-STARRS 1	·	460 m	MPC · JPL
862797	2014 RZ_{17}	—	September 25, 2009	Kitt Peak	Spacewatch	H	350 m	MPC · JPL
862798	2014 RD_{21}	—	November 6, 2005	Mount Lemmon	Mount Lemmon Survey	·	1.3 km	MPC · JPL
862799	2014 RE_{25}	—	August 22, 2014	Haleakala	Pan-STARRS 1	·	2.4 km	MPC · JPL
862800	2014 RL_{25}	—	September 13, 2004	Kitt Peak	Spacewatch	·	390 m	MPC · JPL

== 862801–862900 ==
back to top

Designation			Discovery			Properties		Ref
Permanent	Provisional	Named after	Date	Site	Discoverer(s)	Category	Diam.	Ref
862801	2014 RQ_{25}	—	August 18, 2014	Haleakala	Pan-STARRS 1	H	360 m	MPC · JPL
862802	2014 RG_{27}	—	August 3, 2014	Haleakala	Pan-STARRS 1	·	1.8 km	MPC · JPL
862803	2014 RY_{28}	—	August 22, 2014	Haleakala	Pan-STARRS 1	·	1.8 km	MPC · JPL
862804	2014 RA_{32}	—	June 28, 2014	Haleakala	Pan-STARRS 1	·	1.6 km	MPC · JPL
862805	2014 RN_{33}	—	July 7, 2014	Haleakala	Pan-STARRS 1	·	1.9 km	MPC · JPL
862806	2014 RR_{35}	—	August 22, 2014	Haleakala	Pan-STARRS 1	(883)	480 m	MPC · JPL
862807	2014 RG_{36}	—	September 12, 2009	Kitt Peak	Spacewatch	·	1.8 km	MPC · JPL
862808	2014 RC_{38}	—	February 8, 2011	Mount Lemmon	Mount Lemmon Survey	·	2.3 km	MPC · JPL
862809	2014 RB_{39}	—	April 16, 2013	Cerro Tololo-DECam	DECam	·	810 m	MPC · JPL
862810	2014 RD_{40}	—	August 23, 2014	Haleakala	Pan-STARRS 1	·	850 m	MPC · JPL
862811	2014 RJ_{42}	—	October 18, 2007	Mount Lemmon	Mount Lemmon Survey	·	620 m	MPC · JPL
862812	2014 RM_{43}	—	September 13, 2014	Haleakala	Pan-STARRS 1	·	1.0 km	MPC · JPL
862813	2014 RW_{43}	—	September 13, 2014	Haleakala	Pan-STARRS 1	LIX	2.5 km	MPC · JPL
862814	2014 RQ_{45}	—	April 7, 2013	Mount Lemmon	Mount Lemmon Survey	MAS	560 m	MPC · JPL
862815	2014 RR_{45}	—	August 28, 2014	Haleakala	Pan-STARRS 1	·	820 m	MPC · JPL
862816	2014 RY_{45}	—	September 29, 2003	Kitt Peak	Spacewatch	HYG	1.9 km	MPC · JPL
862817	2014 RD_{46}	—	October 25, 2003	Kitt Peak	Spacewatch	NYS	850 m	MPC · JPL
862818	2014 RK_{46}	—	August 26, 2005	Palomar	NEAT	·	1.3 km	MPC · JPL
862819	2014 RJ_{47}	—	August 27, 2014	Haleakala	Pan-STARRS 1	·	2.4 km	MPC · JPL
862820	2014 RN_{47}	—	September 14, 2014	Mount Lemmon	Mount Lemmon Survey	THM	1.4 km	MPC · JPL
862821	2014 RN_{49}	—	August 25, 2014	Haleakala	Pan-STARRS 1	NYS	830 m	MPC · JPL
862822	2014 RP_{49}	—	October 21, 2003	Kitt Peak	Spacewatch	MAS	520 m	MPC · JPL
862823	2014 RF_{50}	—	October 18, 2009	Mount Lemmon	Mount Lemmon Survey	·	1.6 km	MPC · JPL
862824	2014 RV_{55}	—	September 15, 2014	Mount Lemmon	Mount Lemmon Survey	·	1.9 km	MPC · JPL
862825	2014 RM_{57}	—	August 27, 2014	Haleakala	Pan-STARRS 1	KOR	1.1 km	MPC · JPL
862826	2014 RU_{57}	—	September 15, 2014	Mount Lemmon	Mount Lemmon Survey	·	820 m	MPC · JPL
862827	2014 RB_{58}	—	October 18, 1998	Kitt Peak	Spacewatch	THM	1.5 km	MPC · JPL
862828	2014 RU_{58}	—	September 15, 2014	Mount Lemmon	Mount Lemmon Survey	·	1.2 km	MPC · JPL
862829	2014 RL_{59}	—	September 12, 2007	Mount Lemmon	Mount Lemmon Survey	·	710 m	MPC · JPL
862830	2014 RZ_{59}	—	September 30, 2005	Mount Lemmon	Mount Lemmon Survey	MRX	730 m	MPC · JPL
862831	2014 RF_{63}	—	August 22, 2014	Haleakala	Pan-STARRS 1	·	1.7 km	MPC · JPL
862832	2014 RC_{64}	—	March 14, 2013	Kitt Peak	Spacewatch	H	370 m	MPC · JPL
862833	2014 RL_{64}	—	October 11, 2007	Kitt Peak	Spacewatch	·	860 m	MPC · JPL
862834	2014 RB_{66}	—	September 2, 2014	Haleakala	Pan-STARRS 1	LIX	2.4 km	MPC · JPL
862835	2014 RG_{66}	—	October 22, 2009	Mount Lemmon	Mount Lemmon Survey	·	1.4 km	MPC · JPL
862836	2014 RZ_{67}	—	March 13, 2013	Kitt Peak	Spacewatch	·	1.4 km	MPC · JPL
862837	2014 RL_{68}	—	September 4, 2014	Haleakala	Pan-STARRS 1	·	1.6 km	MPC · JPL
862838	2014 RU_{69}	—	September 14, 2014	Haleakala	Pan-STARRS 1	·	2.4 km	MPC · JPL
862839	2014 RD_{70}	—	September 13, 2014	Haleakala	Pan-STARRS 1	PHO	890 m	MPC · JPL
862840	2014 RK_{71}	—	September 2, 2014	Haleakala	Pan-STARRS 1	·	450 m	MPC · JPL
862841	2014 RS_{71}	—	September 2, 2014	Haleakala	Pan-STARRS 1	·	2.5 km	MPC · JPL
862842	2014 RA_{72}	—	September 2, 2014	Haleakala	Pan-STARRS 1	·	1.4 km	MPC · JPL
862843	2014 RS_{72}	—	September 14, 2014	Mount Lemmon	Mount Lemmon Survey	·	860 m	MPC · JPL
862844	2014 RF_{73}	—	September 4, 2014	Haleakala	Pan-STARRS 1	·	1.6 km	MPC · JPL
862845	2014 RN_{73}	—	September 2, 2014	Haleakala	Pan-STARRS 1	·	2.1 km	MPC · JPL
862846	2014 RO_{73}	—	September 6, 2014	Mount Lemmon	Mount Lemmon Survey	·	2.3 km	MPC · JPL
862847	2014 RQ_{74}	—	September 2, 2014	Haleakala	Pan-STARRS 1	EOS	1.5 km	MPC · JPL
862848	2014 RR_{74}	—	September 6, 2014	Mount Lemmon	Mount Lemmon Survey	·	1.9 km	MPC · JPL
862849	2014 RT_{74}	—	September 1, 2014	Mount Lemmon	Mount Lemmon Survey	·	2.3 km	MPC · JPL
862850	2014 RX_{74}	—	September 2, 2014	Haleakala	Pan-STARRS 1	V	460 m	MPC · JPL
862851	2014 RA_{75}	—	September 1, 2014	Mount Lemmon	Mount Lemmon Survey	VER	2.0 km	MPC · JPL
862852	2014 RE_{75}	—	September 2, 2014	Haleakala	Pan-STARRS 1	·	1.9 km	MPC · JPL
862853	2014 RK_{75}	—	September 15, 2014	Mount Lemmon	Mount Lemmon Survey	·	2.1 km	MPC · JPL
862854	2014 RY_{75}	—	September 1, 2014	Haleakala	Pan-STARRS 1	·	710 m	MPC · JPL
862855	2014 RA_{77}	—	September 14, 2014	Mount Lemmon	Mount Lemmon Survey	·	1.9 km	MPC · JPL
862856	2014 RF_{77}	—	September 26, 2003	Sacramento Peak	SDSS	·	750 m	MPC · JPL
862857	2014 RG_{77}	—	September 4, 2014	Haleakala	Pan-STARRS 1	·	1.1 km	MPC · JPL
862858	2014 RR_{77}	—	September 1, 2014	Haleakala	Pan-STARRS 1	·	800 m	MPC · JPL
862859	2014 RS_{77}	—	September 2, 2014	Haleakala	Pan-STARRS 1	HOF	1.9 km	MPC · JPL
862860	2014 RC_{78}	—	September 2, 2014	Haleakala	Pan-STARRS 1	THM	1.6 km	MPC · JPL
862861	2014 RE_{78}	—	September 2, 2014	Kitt Peak	Spacewatch	·	1.8 km	MPC · JPL
862862	2014 RK_{78}	—	September 11, 2014	Haleakala	Pan-STARRS 1	V	440 m	MPC · JPL
862863	2014 RC_{79}	—	September 2, 2014	Haleakala	Pan-STARRS 1	·	1.8 km	MPC · JPL
862864	2014 RE_{79}	—	October 16, 2009	Mount Lemmon	Mount Lemmon Survey	·	1.8 km	MPC · JPL
862865	2014 RK_{79}	—	September 2, 2014	Haleakala	Pan-STARRS 1	·	2.0 km	MPC · JPL
862866	2014 RM_{79}	—	September 2, 2014	Haleakala	Pan-STARRS 1	·	2.2 km	MPC · JPL
862867	2014 RR_{79}	—	September 2, 2014	Haleakala	Pan-STARRS 1	·	2.2 km	MPC · JPL
862868	2014 RG_{80}	—	September 2, 2014	Haleakala	Pan-STARRS 1	·	2.2 km	MPC · JPL
862869	2014 RQ_{80}	—	September 2, 2014	Haleakala	Pan-STARRS 1	EOS	1.5 km	MPC · JPL
862870	2014 RS_{80}	—	September 2, 2014	Haleakala	Pan-STARRS 1	·	2.1 km	MPC · JPL
862871	2014 RB_{81}	—	September 1, 2014	Roque de los Muchachos	EURONEAR	T_{j} (2.98) · EUP	2.1 km	MPC · JPL
862872	2014 RH_{81}	—	September 2, 2014	Haleakala	Pan-STARRS 1	VER	1.9 km	MPC · JPL
862873	2014 RL_{81}	—	September 15, 2014	Mount Lemmon	Mount Lemmon Survey	·	2.0 km	MPC · JPL
862874	2014 RM_{81}	—	September 2, 2014	Haleakala	Pan-STARRS 1	·	2.1 km	MPC · JPL
862875	2014 RN_{81}	—	September 2, 2014	Haleakala	Pan-STARRS 1	·	1.7 km	MPC · JPL
862876	2014 RQ_{81}	—	September 4, 2014	Haleakala	Pan-STARRS 1	·	2.2 km	MPC · JPL
862877	2014 RS_{81}	—	September 1, 2014	Mount Lemmon	Mount Lemmon Survey	EOS	1.4 km	MPC · JPL
862878	2014 RT_{82}	—	September 2, 2014	Haleakala	Pan-STARRS 1	·	1.6 km	MPC · JPL
862879	2014 RJ_{83}	—	September 6, 2014	Mount Lemmon	Mount Lemmon Survey	·	2.2 km	MPC · JPL
862880	2014 RW_{83}	—	September 14, 2014	Mount Lemmon	Mount Lemmon Survey	·	890 m	MPC · JPL
862881	2014 RA_{84}	—	September 14, 2014	Mount Lemmon	Mount Lemmon Survey	·	870 m	MPC · JPL
862882	2014 RC_{84}	—	September 14, 2014	Mount Lemmon	Mount Lemmon Survey	MAS	430 m	MPC · JPL
862883	2014 RG_{84}	—	September 2, 2014	Kitt Peak	Spacewatch	·	470 m	MPC · JPL
862884	2014 RR_{84}	—	September 2, 2014	Haleakala	Pan-STARRS 1	EOS	1.4 km	MPC · JPL
862885	2014 RW_{84}	—	September 14, 2014	Kitt Peak	Spacewatch	·	1.0 km	MPC · JPL
862886	2014 RC_{85}	—	September 2, 2014	Haleakala	Pan-STARRS 1	·	830 m	MPC · JPL
862887	2014 RL_{85}	—	September 2, 2014	Haleakala	Pan-STARRS 1	V	510 m	MPC · JPL
862888	2014 RB_{86}	—	August 21, 2003	Campo Imperatore	CINEOS	·	790 m	MPC · JPL
862889	2014 RG_{87}	—	September 2, 2014	Haleakala	Pan-STARRS 1	·	1.8 km	MPC · JPL
862890	2014 RL_{87}	—	May 3, 2006	Kitt Peak	Spacewatch	·	770 m	MPC · JPL
862891	2014 RF_{88}	—	September 4, 2014	Haleakala	Pan-STARRS 1	·	1.5 km	MPC · JPL
862892	2014 RU_{88}	—	September 2, 2014	Haleakala	Pan-STARRS 1	·	1.8 km	MPC · JPL
862893	2014 RV_{89}	—	September 3, 2014	Mount Lemmon	Mount Lemmon Survey	·	2.0 km	MPC · JPL
862894	2014 RF_{90}	—	September 2, 2014	Haleakala	Pan-STARRS 1	LIX	2.2 km	MPC · JPL
862895	2014 RR_{91}	—	September 2, 2014	Haleakala	Pan-STARRS 1	·	910 m	MPC · JPL
862896	2014 RT_{91}	—	September 2, 2014	Haleakala	Pan-STARRS 1	·	1.2 km	MPC · JPL
862897	2014 RV_{94}	—	September 2, 2014	Haleakala	Pan-STARRS 1	·	2.0 km	MPC · JPL
862898	2014 RY_{94}	—	September 3, 2014	Mount Lemmon	Mount Lemmon Survey	·	1.8 km	MPC · JPL
862899	2014 RY_{96}	—	September 15, 2014	Mount Lemmon	Mount Lemmon Survey	·	1.7 km	MPC · JPL
862900	2014 RD_{97}	—	September 12, 2014	Haleakala	Pan-STARRS 1	·	960 m	MPC · JPL

== 862901–863000 ==
back to top

Designation			Discovery			Properties		Ref
Permanent	Provisional	Named after	Date	Site	Discoverer(s)	Category	Diam.	Ref
862901	2014 RN_{97}	—	September 14, 2014	Mount Lemmon	Mount Lemmon Survey	·	1.8 km	MPC · JPL
862902	2014 SJ	—	March 4, 2013	Haleakala	Pan-STARRS 1	H	410 m	MPC · JPL
862903	2014 SA_{3}	—	September 20, 2009	Mount Lemmon	Mount Lemmon Survey	·	1.7 km	MPC · JPL
862904	2014 SU_{4}	—	July 30, 2014	Haleakala	Pan-STARRS 1	V	450 m	MPC · JPL
862905	2014 SF_{6}	—	September 15, 2009	Kitt Peak	Spacewatch	·	1.5 km	MPC · JPL
862906	2014 SD_{7}	—	August 3, 2014	Haleakala	Pan-STARRS 1	·	1.6 km	MPC · JPL
862907	2014 SM_{9}	—	February 10, 2011	Mount Lemmon	Mount Lemmon Survey	·	1.8 km	MPC · JPL
862908	2014 SU_{9}	—	August 6, 2014	Haleakala	Pan-STARRS 1	·	2.1 km	MPC · JPL
862909	2014 SN_{13}	—	July 31, 2014	Haleakala	Pan-STARRS 1	H	460 m	MPC · JPL
862910	2014 SV_{14}	—	July 31, 2014	Haleakala	Pan-STARRS 1	·	520 m	MPC · JPL
862911	2014 SO_{15}	—	November 3, 2007	Kitt Peak	Spacewatch	·	700 m	MPC · JPL
862912	2014 SP_{15}	—	August 23, 2014	Haleakala	Pan-STARRS 1	EOS	1.2 km	MPC · JPL
862913	2014 ST_{15}	—	August 23, 2014	Haleakala	Pan-STARRS 1	URS	2.2 km	MPC · JPL
862914	2014 SA_{16}	—	August 20, 2014	Haleakala	Pan-STARRS 1	·	1.8 km	MPC · JPL
862915	2014 SC_{16}	—	July 7, 2014	Haleakala	Pan-STARRS 1	·	850 m	MPC · JPL
862916	2014 SF_{20}	—	September 17, 2014	Haleakala	Pan-STARRS 1	·	1.8 km	MPC · JPL
862917	2014 SH_{21}	—	September 12, 2001	Socorro	LINEAR	·	1.2 km	MPC · JPL
862918	2014 SB_{22}	—	August 20, 2014	Haleakala	Pan-STARRS 1	·	2.3 km	MPC · JPL
862919	2014 SF_{22}	—	August 27, 2014	Haleakala	Pan-STARRS 1	AEO	820 m	MPC · JPL
862920	2014 SJ_{22}	—	August 27, 2014	Haleakala	Pan-STARRS 1	·	1.6 km	MPC · JPL
862921	2014 SC_{24}	—	August 27, 2014	Haleakala	Pan-STARRS 1	MAS	560 m	MPC · JPL
862922	2014 SN_{25}	—	August 27, 2014	Haleakala	Pan-STARRS 1	·	1.2 km	MPC · JPL
862923	2014 SR_{25}	—	October 16, 2009	Mount Lemmon	Mount Lemmon Survey	·	1.8 km	MPC · JPL
862924	2014 SN_{26}	—	September 17, 2014	Haleakala	Pan-STARRS 1	·	1.6 km	MPC · JPL
862925	2014 SQ_{26}	—	February 11, 2011	Mount Lemmon	Mount Lemmon Survey	·	2.2 km	MPC · JPL
862926	2014 SC_{28}	—	August 20, 2014	Haleakala	Pan-STARRS 1	MAS	510 m	MPC · JPL
862927	2014 SD_{29}	—	July 7, 2014	Haleakala	Pan-STARRS 1	MAS	520 m	MPC · JPL
862928	2014 SO_{29}	—	September 17, 2014	Haleakala	Pan-STARRS 1	·	810 m	MPC · JPL
862929	2014 SW_{29}	—	July 31, 2014	Haleakala	Pan-STARRS 1	·	950 m	MPC · JPL
862930	2014 SC_{31}	—	August 23, 2014	Haleakala	Pan-STARRS 1	·	1.3 km	MPC · JPL
862931	2014 SK_{32}	—	August 20, 2014	Haleakala	Pan-STARRS 1	·	1.8 km	MPC · JPL
862932	2014 SC_{33}	—	October 20, 2003	Kitt Peak	Spacewatch	·	1.8 km	MPC · JPL
862933	2014 SF_{33}	—	August 31, 2014	Haleakala	Pan-STARRS 1	·	1.6 km	MPC · JPL
862934	2014 SV_{33}	—	August 20, 2014	Haleakala	Pan-STARRS 1	·	450 m	MPC · JPL
862935	2014 SA_{35}	—	September 17, 2014	Haleakala	Pan-STARRS 1	(12739)	1.2 km	MPC · JPL
862936	2014 SL_{36}	—	August 25, 2003	Cerro Tololo	Deep Ecliptic Survey	THM	1.7 km	MPC · JPL
862937	2014 SV_{36}	—	September 14, 2007	Mount Lemmon	Mount Lemmon Survey	·	630 m	MPC · JPL
862938	2014 SF_{37}	—	July 7, 2014	Haleakala	Pan-STARRS 1	·	1.8 km	MPC · JPL
862939	2014 SS_{37}	—	August 23, 2014	Haleakala	Pan-STARRS 1	·	1.6 km	MPC · JPL
862940	2014 SC_{38}	—	September 21, 2009	Mount Lemmon	Mount Lemmon Survey	·	2.1 km	MPC · JPL
862941	2014 SS_{43}	—	August 23, 2014	Haleakala	Pan-STARRS 1	·	1.8 km	MPC · JPL
862942	2014 SP_{44}	—	August 23, 2014	Haleakala	Pan-STARRS 1	·	1.3 km	MPC · JPL
862943	2014 SF_{45}	—	May 26, 2006	Mount Lemmon	Mount Lemmon Survey	·	960 m	MPC · JPL
862944	2014 SR_{45}	—	September 19, 2009	Kitt Peak	Spacewatch	EOS	1.2 km	MPC · JPL
862945	2014 ST_{45}	—	August 28, 2014	Haleakala	Pan-STARRS 1	·	500 m	MPC · JPL
862946	2014 SQ_{46}	—	August 28, 2014	Haleakala	Pan-STARRS 1	·	2.0 km	MPC · JPL
862947	2014 SJ_{47}	—	August 28, 2014	Haleakala	Pan-STARRS 1	·	2.1 km	MPC · JPL
862948	2014 SE_{49}	—	August 28, 2014	Haleakala	Pan-STARRS 1	·	1.2 km	MPC · JPL
862949	2014 SW_{49}	—	September 17, 2009	Kitt Peak	Spacewatch	·	1.9 km	MPC · JPL
862950	2014 SX_{49}	—	August 22, 2014	Haleakala	Pan-STARRS 1	·	1.8 km	MPC · JPL
862951	2014 SL_{50}	—	August 23, 2014	Haleakala	Pan-STARRS 1	·	690 m	MPC · JPL
862952	2014 SQ_{50}	—	September 27, 2009	Mount Lemmon	Mount Lemmon Survey	·	1.7 km	MPC · JPL
862953	2014 SS_{50}	—	August 23, 2014	Haleakala	Pan-STARRS 1	EOS	1.3 km	MPC · JPL
862954	2014 SK_{51}	—	September 20, 2009	Mount Lemmon	Mount Lemmon Survey	·	1.6 km	MPC · JPL
862955	2014 SO_{51}	—	October 17, 2010	Mount Lemmon	Mount Lemmon Survey	·	1.0 km	MPC · JPL
862956	2014 SU_{52}	—	April 10, 2005	Kitt Peak	Deep Ecliptic Survey	·	2.1 km	MPC · JPL
862957	2014 SV_{55}	—	August 22, 2014	Haleakala	Pan-STARRS 1	EOS	1.3 km	MPC · JPL
862958	2014 SA_{57}	—	September 17, 2014	Haleakala	Pan-STARRS 1	·	2.0 km	MPC · JPL
862959	2014 SP_{57}	—	May 12, 2013	Kitt Peak	Spacewatch	·	2.0 km	MPC · JPL
862960	2014 SA_{59}	—	August 22, 2014	Haleakala	Pan-STARRS 1	·	940 m	MPC · JPL
862961	2014 SP_{59}	—	July 31, 2014	Haleakala	Pan-STARRS 1	·	930 m	MPC · JPL
862962	2014 SG_{60}	—	August 28, 2014	Haleakala	Pan-STARRS 1	·	840 m	MPC · JPL
862963	2014 SQ_{61}	—	January 19, 2012	Haleakala	Pan-STARRS 1	·	1.9 km	MPC · JPL
862964	2014 SD_{65}	—	April 9, 2010	Kitt Peak	Spacewatch	·	670 m	MPC · JPL
862965	2014 SQ_{66}	—	July 30, 2014	Haleakala	Pan-STARRS 1	·	1.5 km	MPC · JPL
862966	2014 SV_{66}	—	March 21, 2010	Mount Lemmon	Mount Lemmon Survey	·	500 m	MPC · JPL
862967	2014 SX_{67}	—	July 25, 2014	Haleakala	Pan-STARRS 1	·	1.8 km	MPC · JPL
862968	2014 SF_{72}	—	April 10, 2013	Haleakala	Pan-STARRS 1	·	1.6 km	MPC · JPL
862969	2014 ST_{75}	—	September 18, 2014	Haleakala	Pan-STARRS 1	·	2.1 km	MPC · JPL
862970	2014 SK_{77}	—	August 28, 2014	Haleakala	Pan-STARRS 1	·	530 m	MPC · JPL
862971	2014 SN_{77}	—	August 28, 2014	Haleakala	Pan-STARRS 1	·	1.7 km	MPC · JPL
862972	2014 SV_{77}	—	August 28, 2014	Haleakala	Pan-STARRS 1	V	420 m	MPC · JPL
862973	2014 SE_{78}	—	August 28, 2014	Haleakala	Pan-STARRS 1	·	870 m	MPC · JPL
862974	2014 SV_{79}	—	August 28, 2014	Haleakala	Pan-STARRS 1	·	2.1 km	MPC · JPL
862975	2014 SA_{81}	—	September 18, 2014	Haleakala	Pan-STARRS 1	·	690 m	MPC · JPL
862976	2014 SO_{81}	—	August 28, 2014	Haleakala	Pan-STARRS 1	EUN	730 m	MPC · JPL
862977	2014 SN_{83}	—	August 27, 2014	Haleakala	Pan-STARRS 1	EOS	1.3 km	MPC · JPL
862978	2014 SS_{83}	—	July 29, 2014	Haleakala	Pan-STARRS 1	·	570 m	MPC · JPL
862979	2014 SF_{84}	—	September 21, 2009	Mount Lemmon	Mount Lemmon Survey	·	1.6 km	MPC · JPL
862980	2014 ST_{84}	—	February 8, 2011	Mount Lemmon	Mount Lemmon Survey	VER	1.9 km	MPC · JPL
862981	2014 SG_{85}	—	November 9, 2007	Mount Lemmon	Mount Lemmon Survey	V	420 m	MPC · JPL
862982	2014 SU_{86}	—	September 18, 2014	Haleakala	Pan-STARRS 1	·	2.2 km	MPC · JPL
862983	2014 SB_{88}	—	August 27, 2014	Haleakala	Pan-STARRS 1	·	2.2 km	MPC · JPL
862984	2014 SG_{89}	—	September 16, 2003	Kitt Peak	Spacewatch	EOS	1.5 km	MPC · JPL
862985	2014 SW_{89}	—	October 29, 2005	Kitt Peak	Spacewatch	·	1.2 km	MPC · JPL
862986	2014 SS_{91}	—	September 18, 2014	Haleakala	Pan-STARRS 1	·	1.8 km	MPC · JPL
862987	2014 SP_{94}	—	November 27, 2009	Kitt Peak	Spacewatch	HYG	1.8 km	MPC · JPL
862988	2014 SF_{95}	—	September 2, 2014	Haleakala	Pan-STARRS 1	·	1.8 km	MPC · JPL
862989	2014 SJ_{95}	—	September 18, 2014	Haleakala	Pan-STARRS 1	·	2.1 km	MPC · JPL
862990	2014 SV_{95}	—	September 18, 2014	Haleakala	Pan-STARRS 1	·	1.2 km	MPC · JPL
862991	2014 SW_{96}	—	September 18, 2014	Haleakala	Pan-STARRS 1	·	820 m	MPC · JPL
862992	2014 SF_{97}	—	September 25, 2003	Mauna Kea	P. A. Wiegert	MAS	480 m	MPC · JPL
862993	2014 SM_{97}	—	August 27, 2014	Haleakala	Pan-STARRS 1	·	730 m	MPC · JPL
862994	2014 SP_{98}	—	September 29, 2003	Kitt Peak	Spacewatch	NYS	660 m	MPC · JPL
862995	2014 SK_{100}	—	August 27, 2014	Haleakala	Pan-STARRS 1	·	1.9 km	MPC · JPL
862996	2014 SX_{101}	—	August 27, 2014	Haleakala	Pan-STARRS 1	·	2.1 km	MPC · JPL
862997	2014 SE_{104}	—	September 18, 2014	Haleakala	Pan-STARRS 1	VER	2.1 km	MPC · JPL
862998	2014 SV_{105}	—	September 18, 2014	Haleakala	Pan-STARRS 1	·	1.2 km	MPC · JPL
862999	2014 SE_{106}	—	September 18, 2014	Haleakala	Pan-STARRS 1	V	420 m	MPC · JPL
863000	2014 SJ_{111}	—	September 22, 2003	Kitt Peak	Spacewatch	MAS	470 m	MPC · JPL

back to top
