= List of minor planets: 821001–822000 =

The following is a partial list of minor planets, running from minor-planet number 821001 through 822000, inclusive. The primary data for this and other partial lists is based on JPL's "Small-Body Orbital Elements" and data available from the Minor Planet Center. Critical list information is also provided by the MPC, unless otherwise specified from Lowell Observatory. A detailed description of the table's columns and additional sources are given on the main page including a complete list of every page in this series, and a statistical break-up on the dynamical classification of minor planets.

Also see the summary list of all named bodies in numerical and alphabetical order, and the corresponding naming citations for the number range of this particular list. New namings may only be added to this list after official publication, as the preannouncement of names is condemned by the Working Group for Small Bodies Nomenclature of the International Astronomical Union.

Near-Earth obj.	MBA (inner)	MBA (outer)	Centaur
Mars-crosser	MBA (middle)	Jupiter trojan	Trans-Neptunian obj.
Unclassified

== 821001–821100 ==
Designation			Discovery			Properties		Ref
Permanent	Provisional	Named after	Date	Site	Discoverer(s)	Category	Diam.	Ref
821001	2015 BP_{330}	—	October 23, 2013	Mount Lemmon	Mount Lemmon Survey	·	1.4 km	MPC · JPL
821002	2015 BV_{332}	—	January 17, 2015	Haleakala	Pan-STARRS 1	·	1.1 km	MPC · JPL
821003	2015 BF_{336}	—	July 29, 2009	Catalina	CSS	PHO	680 m	MPC · JPL
821004	2015 BY_{336}	—	October 29, 2010	Kitt Peak	Spacewatch	·	650 m	MPC · JPL
821005	2015 BW_{339}	—	January 17, 2015	Haleakala	Pan-STARRS 1	MAS	690 m	MPC · JPL
821006	2015 BB_{352}	—	January 18, 2015	Haleakala	Pan-STARRS 1	·	2.1 km	MPC · JPL
821007	2015 BK_{354}	—	January 18, 2015	Mount Lemmon	Mount Lemmon Survey	EOS	1.4 km	MPC · JPL
821008	2015 BM_{360}	—	June 18, 2013	Haleakala	Pan-STARRS 1	·	860 m	MPC · JPL
821009	2015 BU_{365}	—	January 20, 2015	Haleakala	Pan-STARRS 1	·	1.3 km	MPC · JPL
821010	2015 BA_{367}	—	December 29, 2014	Haleakala	Pan-STARRS 1	·	1.3 km	MPC · JPL
821011	2015 BK_{368}	—	October 16, 2007	Mount Lemmon	Mount Lemmon Survey	·	490 m	MPC · JPL
821012	2015 BH_{369}	—	January 20, 2015	Haleakala	Pan-STARRS 1	·	1.3 km	MPC · JPL
821013	2015 BG_{378}	—	January 18, 2015	Haleakala	Pan-STARRS 1	·	1.3 km	MPC · JPL
821014	2015 BY_{383}	—	November 1, 2013	Mount Lemmon	Mount Lemmon Survey	·	1.2 km	MPC · JPL
821015	2015 BW_{392}	—	January 20, 2015	Haleakala	Pan-STARRS 1	·	900 m	MPC · JPL
821016	2015 BF_{393}	—	December 13, 2006	Kitt Peak	Spacewatch	·	860 m	MPC · JPL
821017	2015 BG_{397}	—	January 20, 2015	Haleakala	Pan-STARRS 1	(5)	960 m	MPC · JPL
821018	2015 BT_{399}	—	December 27, 2014	Mount Lemmon	Mount Lemmon Survey	·	1.3 km	MPC · JPL
821019	2015 BU_{401}	—	January 20, 2015	Haleakala	Pan-STARRS 1	EUN	820 m	MPC · JPL
821020	2015 BM_{403}	—	March 13, 2012	Mount Lemmon	Mount Lemmon Survey	·	430 m	MPC · JPL
821021	2015 BZ_{405}	—	February 16, 2012	Haleakala	Pan-STARRS 1	·	690 m	MPC · JPL
821022	2015 BB_{406}	—	December 3, 2005	Mauna Kea	A. Boattini	AGN	810 m	MPC · JPL
821023	2015 BW_{408}	—	January 20, 2015	Haleakala	Pan-STARRS 1	·	740 m	MPC · JPL
821024	2015 BT_{410}	—	August 14, 2013	Haleakala	Pan-STARRS 1	·	540 m	MPC · JPL
821025	2015 BE_{412}	—	November 11, 2006	Mount Lemmon	Mount Lemmon Survey	·	840 m	MPC · JPL
821026	2015 BQ_{412}	—	January 20, 2015	Haleakala	Pan-STARRS 1	·	1.1 km	MPC · JPL
821027	2015 BR_{413}	—	January 20, 2015	Haleakala	Pan-STARRS 1	·	1.2 km	MPC · JPL
821028	2015 BQ_{414}	—	January 20, 2015	Haleakala	Pan-STARRS 1	V	510 m	MPC · JPL
821029	2015 BS_{415}	—	February 2, 2008	Mount Lemmon	Mount Lemmon Survey	·	410 m	MPC · JPL
821030	2015 BT_{420}	—	March 13, 2012	Kitt Peak	Spacewatch	·	510 m	MPC · JPL
821031	2015 BL_{421}	—	January 20, 2015	Haleakala	Pan-STARRS 1	·	430 m	MPC · JPL
821032	2015 BQ_{422}	—	January 20, 2015	Haleakala	Pan-STARRS 1	·	1.5 km	MPC · JPL
821033	2015 BY_{422}	—	May 7, 2005	Mount Lemmon	Mount Lemmon Survey	·	500 m	MPC · JPL
821034	2015 BL_{423}	—	January 20, 2015	Haleakala	Pan-STARRS 1	·	1.1 km	MPC · JPL
821035	2015 BZ_{431}	—	November 9, 2013	Mount Lemmon	Mount Lemmon Survey	·	1.2 km	MPC · JPL
821036	2015 BZ_{432}	—	March 5, 2011	Mount Lemmon	Mount Lemmon Survey	MAR	770 m	MPC · JPL
821037	2015 BE_{436}	—	April 22, 2009	Mount Lemmon	Mount Lemmon Survey	·	520 m	MPC · JPL
821038	2015 BM_{437}	—	October 3, 2013	Haleakala	Pan-STARRS 1	·	870 m	MPC · JPL
821039	2015 BT_{437}	—	July 5, 2005	Kitt Peak	Spacewatch	·	1 km	MPC · JPL
821040	2015 BQ_{439}	—	September 9, 2013	Haleakala	Pan-STARRS 1	·	470 m	MPC · JPL
821041	2015 BQ_{443}	—	October 22, 2005	Catalina	CSS	·	850 m	MPC · JPL
821042	2015 BO_{444}	—	January 20, 2015	Haleakala	Pan-STARRS 1	KOR	880 m	MPC · JPL
821043	2015 BZ_{445}	—	February 27, 2006	Kitt Peak	Spacewatch	·	1.4 km	MPC · JPL
821044	2015 BQ_{448}	—	November 6, 2013	Haleakala	Pan-STARRS 1	·	2.3 km	MPC · JPL
821045	2015 BD_{459}	—	November 9, 2013	Haleakala	Pan-STARRS 1	HOF	1.8 km	MPC · JPL
821046	2015 BY_{465}	—	May 22, 2011	Mount Lemmon	Mount Lemmon Survey	·	1.7 km	MPC · JPL
821047	2015 BC_{466}	—	January 20, 2015	Haleakala	Pan-STARRS 1	·	2.9 km	MPC · JPL
821048	2015 BF_{466}	—	September 12, 2013	Kislovodsk	V. Nevski, V. Savanevych	JUN	870 m	MPC · JPL
821049	2015 BE_{473}	—	January 20, 2015	Haleakala	Pan-STARRS 1	·	2.3 km	MPC · JPL
821050	2015 BZ_{473}	—	October 17, 2010	Mount Lemmon	Mount Lemmon Survey	·	550 m	MPC · JPL
821051	2015 BS_{474}	—	January 30, 2011	Haleakala	Pan-STARRS 1	EUN	990 m	MPC · JPL
821052	2015 BC_{477}	—	January 20, 2015	Haleakala	Pan-STARRS 1	·	1.1 km	MPC · JPL
821053	2015 BM_{482}	—	January 20, 2015	Haleakala	Pan-STARRS 1	NEM	1.5 km	MPC · JPL
821054	2015 BA_{484}	—	January 20, 2015	Haleakala	Pan-STARRS 1	·	490 m	MPC · JPL
821055	2015 BS_{485}	—	October 24, 2013	Mount Lemmon	Mount Lemmon Survey	·	1.2 km	MPC · JPL
821056	2015 BN_{491}	—	November 30, 1999	Kitt Peak	Spacewatch	MAS	460 m	MPC · JPL
821057	2015 BR_{493}	—	January 20, 2015	Haleakala	Pan-STARRS 1	·	930 m	MPC · JPL
821058	2015 BC_{494}	—	June 11, 2012	Mount Lemmon	Mount Lemmon Survey	·	630 m	MPC · JPL
821059	2015 BG_{494}	—	February 27, 2012	Haleakala	Pan-STARRS 1	·	470 m	MPC · JPL
821060	2015 BD_{497}	—	January 20, 2015	Haleakala	Pan-STARRS 1	·	1.3 km	MPC · JPL
821061	2015 BK_{500}	—	January 20, 2015	Haleakala	Pan-STARRS 1	·	430 m	MPC · JPL
821062	2015 BD_{501}	—	September 24, 2009	Catalina	CSS	·	1.2 km	MPC · JPL
821063	2015 BY_{501}	—	September 20, 2009	Kitt Peak	Spacewatch	·	1.2 km	MPC · JPL
821064	2015 BP_{505}	—	January 20, 2015	Haleakala	Pan-STARRS 1	·	1.1 km	MPC · JPL
821065	2015 BF_{512}	—	November 6, 2010	Mount Lemmon	Mount Lemmon Survey	·	890 m	MPC · JPL
821066	2015 BN_{521}	—	February 11, 2016	Haleakala	Pan-STARRS 1	3:2	3.6 km	MPC · JPL
821067	2015 BU_{521}	—	September 24, 2008	Mount Lemmon	Mount Lemmon Survey	H	320 m	MPC · JPL
821068	2015 BC_{527}	—	January 23, 2015	Haleakala	Pan-STARRS 1	H	320 m	MPC · JPL
821069	2015 BG_{527}	—	January 25, 2015	Haleakala	Pan-STARRS 1	H	340 m	MPC · JPL
821070	2015 BE_{528}	—	December 12, 2006	Mount Lemmon	Mount Lemmon Survey	H	420 m	MPC · JPL
821071	2015 BS_{530}	—	January 21, 2015	Haleakala	Pan-STARRS 1	AGN	870 m	MPC · JPL
821072	2015 BG_{531}	—	January 22, 2015	Haleakala	Pan-STARRS 1	PAD	1.2 km	MPC · JPL
821073	2015 BU_{532}	—	January 25, 2015	Haleakala	Pan-STARRS 1	·	2.5 km	MPC · JPL
821074	2015 BS_{536}	—	January 20, 2015	Haleakala	Pan-STARRS 1	·	1.2 km	MPC · JPL
821075	2015 BG_{562}	—	January 20, 2015	Haleakala	Pan-STARRS 1	·	490 m	MPC · JPL
821076	2015 BV_{566}	—	October 1, 2009	Mount Lemmon	Mount Lemmon Survey	·	1.3 km	MPC · JPL
821077	2015 BL_{568}	—	January 23, 2015	Haleakala	Pan-STARRS 1	HNS	1.1 km	MPC · JPL
821078	2015 BO_{568}	—	January 23, 2015	Haleakala	Pan-STARRS 1	·	530 m	MPC · JPL
821079	2015 BT_{568}	—	January 23, 2015	Haleakala	Pan-STARRS 1	EOS	1.6 km	MPC · JPL
821080	2015 BW_{570}	—	January 17, 2015	Haleakala	Pan-STARRS 1	·	1.2 km	MPC · JPL
821081	2015 BD_{571}	—	January 19, 2015	Haleakala	Pan-STARRS 1	·	1.9 km	MPC · JPL
821082	2015 BW_{572}	—	July 19, 2010	Bergisch Gladbach	W. Bickel	·	2.1 km	MPC · JPL
821083	2015 BH_{574}	—	January 19, 2015	Haleakala	Pan-STARRS 1	·	1.1 km	MPC · JPL
821084	2015 BK_{574}	—	January 18, 2015	Haleakala	Pan-STARRS 1	PHO	930 m	MPC · JPL
821085	2015 BJ_{575}	—	January 20, 2015	Haleakala	Pan-STARRS 1	·	510 m	MPC · JPL
821086	2015 BQ_{576}	—	September 13, 2007	Mount Lemmon	Mount Lemmon Survey	·	2.2 km	MPC · JPL
821087	2015 BR_{576}	—	August 26, 2016	Haleakala	Pan-STARRS 1	·	850 m	MPC · JPL
821088	2015 BC_{577}	—	July 5, 2016	Haleakala	Pan-STARRS 1	PHO	750 m	MPC · JPL
821089	2015 BX_{577}	—	January 17, 2015	Haleakala	Pan-STARRS 1	HNS	960 m	MPC · JPL
821090	2015 BT_{578}	—	June 4, 2016	Haleakala	Pan-STARRS 1	H	400 m	MPC · JPL
821091	2015 BS_{587}	—	January 22, 2015	Haleakala	Pan-STARRS 1	·	1.2 km	MPC · JPL
821092	2015 BO_{590}	—	February 8, 2011	Mount Lemmon	Mount Lemmon Survey	·	960 m	MPC · JPL
821093	2015 BR_{591}	—	January 17, 2015	Haleakala	Pan-STARRS 1	EOS	1.3 km	MPC · JPL
821094	2015 BG_{595}	—	January 19, 2015	Haleakala	Pan-STARRS 1	H	320 m	MPC · JPL
821095	2015 BU_{595}	—	January 18, 2015	Haleakala	Pan-STARRS 1	·	1.0 km	MPC · JPL
821096	2015 BA_{596}	—	January 23, 2015	Haleakala	Pan-STARRS 1	·	520 m	MPC · JPL
821097	2015 BC_{596}	—	January 17, 2015	Haleakala	Pan-STARRS 1	·	2.0 km	MPC · JPL
821098	2015 BF_{596}	—	January 16, 2015	Haleakala	Pan-STARRS 1	·	1.4 km	MPC · JPL
821099	2015 BP_{596}	—	January 24, 2015	Haleakala	Pan-STARRS 1	·	2.3 km	MPC · JPL
821100	2015 BV_{597}	—	April 6, 2011	Mount Lemmon	Mount Lemmon Survey	GEF	800 m	MPC · JPL

== 821101–821200 ==
back to top

Designation			Discovery			Properties		Ref
Permanent	Provisional	Named after	Date	Site	Discoverer(s)	Category	Diam.	Ref
821101	2015 BL_{599}	—	January 24, 2015	Haleakala	Pan-STARRS 1	·	1.3 km	MPC · JPL
821102	2015 BA_{600}	—	January 27, 2015	Haleakala	Pan-STARRS 1	·	1.3 km	MPC · JPL
821103	2015 BU_{600}	—	January 28, 2015	Haleakala	Pan-STARRS 1	·	530 m	MPC · JPL
821104	2015 BU_{601}	—	January 21, 2015	Haleakala	Pan-STARRS 1	·	530 m	MPC · JPL
821105	2015 BG_{603}	—	November 7, 2010	Mount Lemmon	Mount Lemmon Survey	·	520 m	MPC · JPL
821106	2015 BD_{606}	—	January 22, 2015	Haleakala	Pan-STARRS 1	·	960 m	MPC · JPL
821107	2015 BO_{608}	—	January 20, 2015	Haleakala	Pan-STARRS 1	·	870 m	MPC · JPL
821108	2015 BP_{608}	—	January 22, 2015	Haleakala	Pan-STARRS 1	·	1.2 km	MPC · JPL
821109	2015 BX_{608}	—	January 16, 2015	Haleakala	Pan-STARRS 1	·	3.1 km	MPC · JPL
821110	2015 BO_{610}	—	January 19, 2015	Mount Lemmon	Mount Lemmon Survey	·	1.5 km	MPC · JPL
821111	2015 BY_{612}	—	January 22, 2015	Haleakala	Pan-STARRS 1	·	2.0 km	MPC · JPL
821112	2015 BO_{615}	—	January 25, 2015	Haleakala	Pan-STARRS 1	·	630 m	MPC · JPL
821113	2015 BV_{615}	—	January 20, 2015	Haleakala	Pan-STARRS 1	·	430 m	MPC · JPL
821114	2015 BA_{616}	—	January 16, 2015	Haleakala	Pan-STARRS 1	·	1.8 km	MPC · JPL
821115	2015 BA_{618}	—	January 17, 2015	Haleakala	Pan-STARRS 1	NEM	1.8 km	MPC · JPL
821116	2015 BK_{619}	—	January 18, 2015	Kitt Peak	Spacewatch	·	510 m	MPC · JPL
821117	2015 CB_{2}	—	February 25, 2008	Mount Lemmon	Mount Lemmon Survey	·	690 m	MPC · JPL
821118	2015 CD_{8}	—	January 15, 2015	Haleakala	Pan-STARRS 1	·	1.4 km	MPC · JPL
821119	2015 CA_{15}	—	January 20, 2015	Haleakala	Pan-STARRS 1	BRA	1.2 km	MPC · JPL
821120	2015 CX_{21}	—	January 22, 2015	Haleakala	Pan-STARRS 1	·	810 m	MPC · JPL
821121	2015 CO_{30}	—	January 17, 2015	Haleakala	Pan-STARRS 1	EOS	1.5 km	MPC · JPL
821122	2015 CB_{37}	—	September 13, 2013	Mount Lemmon	Mount Lemmon Survey	·	1.5 km	MPC · JPL
821123	2015 CJ_{42}	—	April 13, 2012	Haleakala	Pan-STARRS 1	·	490 m	MPC · JPL
821124	2015 CA_{44}	—	March 16, 2012	Haleakala	Pan-STARRS 1	·	550 m	MPC · JPL
821125	2015 CH_{46}	—	October 1, 2013	Mount Lemmon	Mount Lemmon Survey	·	540 m	MPC · JPL
821126	2015 CP_{52}	—	January 25, 2015	Haleakala	Pan-STARRS 1	T_{j} (2.74)	4.7 km	MPC · JPL
821127	2015 CF_{53}	—	January 23, 2015	Haleakala	Pan-STARRS 1	·	570 m	MPC · JPL
821128	2015 CH_{65}	—	October 12, 2013	Mount Lemmon	Mount Lemmon Survey	·	1.1 km	MPC · JPL
821129	2015 CK_{66}	—	January 20, 2015	Haleakala	Pan-STARRS 1	·	1.5 km	MPC · JPL
821130	2015 CK_{67}	—	January 17, 2015	Haleakala	Pan-STARRS 1	·	420 m	MPC · JPL
821131	2015 CU_{72}	—	February 11, 2015	Mount Lemmon	Mount Lemmon Survey	MAS	580 m	MPC · JPL
821132	2015 CS_{73}	—	February 14, 2015	Mount Lemmon	Mount Lemmon Survey	·	1.5 km	MPC · JPL
821133	2015 CX_{73}	—	February 14, 2015	Kitt Peak	Spacewatch	·	910 m	MPC · JPL
821134	2015 CB_{75}	—	February 13, 2015	Mount Lemmon	Mount Lemmon Survey	·	570 m	MPC · JPL
821135	2015 CD_{75}	—	January 17, 2015	Haleakala	Pan-STARRS 1	·	440 m	MPC · JPL
821136	2015 CS_{77}	—	February 13, 2015	Mount Lemmon	Mount Lemmon Survey	·	2.0 km	MPC · JPL
821137	2015 CU_{78}	—	November 1, 2013	Mount Lemmon	Mount Lemmon Survey	·	1.5 km	MPC · JPL
821138	2015 CF_{80}	—	February 12, 2015	Piszkéstető	K. Sárneczky	·	770 m	MPC · JPL
821139	2015 CR_{81}	—	February 8, 2015	Mount Lemmon	Mount Lemmon Survey	·	450 m	MPC · JPL
821140	2015 CC_{82}	—	February 14, 2015	Mount Lemmon	Mount Lemmon Survey	·	1.4 km	MPC · JPL
821141	2015 CJ_{82}	—	February 13, 2015	Mount Lemmon	Mount Lemmon Survey	·	540 m	MPC · JPL
821142	2015 DY	—	January 15, 2015	Haleakala	Pan-STARRS 1	H	470 m	MPC · JPL
821143	2015 DH_{1}	—	July 26, 2011	Haleakala	Pan-STARRS 1	H	370 m	MPC · JPL
821144	2015 DH_{4}	—	January 16, 2015	Haleakala	Pan-STARRS 1	·	860 m	MPC · JPL
821145	2015 DE_{5}	—	January 14, 2015	Haleakala	Pan-STARRS 1	·	1.1 km	MPC · JPL
821146	2015 DO_{6}	—	January 19, 2015	Mount Lemmon	Mount Lemmon Survey	·	930 m	MPC · JPL
821147	2015 DN_{8}	—	January 16, 2015	Mount Lemmon	Mount Lemmon Survey	·	1.3 km	MPC · JPL
821148	2015 DD_{12}	—	January 24, 2015	Haleakala	Pan-STARRS 1	·	1.9 km	MPC · JPL
821149	2015 DV_{15}	—	March 1, 2012	Mount Lemmon	Mount Lemmon Survey	·	460 m	MPC · JPL
821150	2015 DP_{17}	—	May 14, 2009	Kitt Peak	Spacewatch	·	430 m	MPC · JPL
821151	2015 DN_{18}	—	January 29, 2015	Haleakala	Pan-STARRS 1	TIR	2.1 km	MPC · JPL
821152	2015 DZ_{19}	—	November 6, 2010	Mount Lemmon	Mount Lemmon Survey	·	780 m	MPC · JPL
821153	2015 DF_{20}	—	February 16, 2015	Haleakala	Pan-STARRS 1	·	1.4 km	MPC · JPL
821154	2015 DG_{20}	—	April 15, 2007	Mount Lemmon	Mount Lemmon Survey	·	890 m	MPC · JPL
821155	2015 DZ_{28}	—	February 16, 2015	Haleakala	Pan-STARRS 1	·	1.4 km	MPC · JPL
821156	2015 DO_{32}	—	February 16, 2015	Haleakala	Pan-STARRS 1	·	990 m	MPC · JPL
821157	2015 DX_{32}	—	April 21, 2012	Mount Lemmon	Mount Lemmon Survey	·	560 m	MPC · JPL
821158	2015 DN_{35}	—	December 1, 2003	Kitt Peak	Spacewatch	·	510 m	MPC · JPL
821159	2015 DW_{38}	—	December 14, 2001	Socorro	LINEAR	(5)	910 m	MPC · JPL
821160	2015 DK_{39}	—	February 16, 2015	Haleakala	Pan-STARRS 1	·	1.2 km	MPC · JPL
821161	2015 DS_{40}	—	January 27, 2015	Haleakala	Pan-STARRS 1	·	810 m	MPC · JPL
821162	2015 DK_{41}	—	February 16, 2015	Haleakala	Pan-STARRS 1	·	1.3 km	MPC · JPL
821163	2015 DQ_{42}	—	February 16, 2015	Haleakala	Pan-STARRS 1	·	1.6 km	MPC · JPL
821164	2015 DL_{43}	—	October 20, 2006	Kitt Peak	Deep Ecliptic Survey	·	1.0 km	MPC · JPL
821165	2015 DY_{50}	—	March 24, 2011	Piszkés-tető	K. Sárneczky, Z. Kuli	·	850 m	MPC · JPL
821166	2015 DA_{51}	—	February 16, 2015	Haleakala	Pan-STARRS 1	·	490 m	MPC · JPL
821167	2015 DW_{54}	—	January 18, 2015	Haleakala	Pan-STARRS 1	·	1.6 km	MPC · JPL
821168	2015 DH_{60}	—	October 23, 2013	Mount Lemmon	Mount Lemmon Survey	·	1.7 km	MPC · JPL
821169	2015 DK_{60}	—	October 24, 2013	Mount Lemmon	Mount Lemmon Survey	AGN	810 m	MPC · JPL
821170	2015 DA_{62}	—	January 18, 2015	Haleakala	Pan-STARRS 1	·	450 m	MPC · JPL
821171	2015 DL_{62}	—	January 18, 2015	Haleakala	Pan-STARRS 1	·	480 m	MPC · JPL
821172	2015 DZ_{64}	—	February 9, 2008	Kitt Peak	Spacewatch	·	520 m	MPC · JPL
821173	2015 DQ_{68}	—	February 10, 2015	Mount Lemmon	Mount Lemmon Survey	·	1.4 km	MPC · JPL
821174	2015 DJ_{74}	—	April 22, 2009	Kitt Peak	Spacewatch	·	540 m	MPC · JPL
821175	2015 DA_{75}	—	December 13, 2009	Mount Lemmon	Mount Lemmon Survey	·	1.1 km	MPC · JPL
821176	2015 DG_{75}	—	January 16, 2015	Haleakala	Pan-STARRS 1	·	1.8 km	MPC · JPL
821177	2015 DT_{77}	—	March 30, 2012	Mount Lemmon	Mount Lemmon Survey	·	580 m	MPC · JPL
821178	2015 DO_{82}	—	January 27, 2015	Haleakala	Pan-STARRS 1	·	1.1 km	MPC · JPL
821179	2015 DR_{85}	—	September 1, 2013	Mount Lemmon	Mount Lemmon Survey	·	920 m	MPC · JPL
821180	2015 DW_{88}	—	January 31, 2006	Kitt Peak	Spacewatch	·	1.2 km	MPC · JPL
821181	2015 DA_{89}	—	February 12, 2008	Kitt Peak	Spacewatch	·	680 m	MPC · JPL
821182	2015 DS_{90}	—	February 16, 2015	Haleakala	Pan-STARRS 1	AST	1.2 km	MPC · JPL
821183	2015 DF_{92}	—	February 16, 2015	Haleakala	Pan-STARRS 1	·	1.0 km	MPC · JPL
821184	2015 DV_{97}	—	September 29, 2005	Mount Lemmon	Mount Lemmon Survey	·	1.2 km	MPC · JPL
821185	2015 DR_{99}	—	April 17, 2012	Kitt Peak	Spacewatch	·	580 m	MPC · JPL
821186	2015 DC_{100}	—	January 19, 2015	Mount Lemmon	Mount Lemmon Survey	·	1.1 km	MPC · JPL
821187	2015 DX_{102}	—	April 12, 2012	Haleakala	Pan-STARRS 1	·	540 m	MPC · JPL
821188	2015 DG_{104}	—	February 17, 2015	Haleakala	Pan-STARRS 1	·	2.4 km	MPC · JPL
821189	2015 DL_{107}	—	November 19, 2008	Mount Lemmon	Mount Lemmon Survey	THB	2.2 km	MPC · JPL
821190	2015 DN_{114}	—	January 15, 2015	Haleakala	Pan-STARRS 1	·	1.7 km	MPC · JPL
821191	2015 DG_{117}	—	December 1, 2005	Kitt Peak	Spacewatch	EUN	1.0 km	MPC · JPL
821192	2015 DA_{120}	—	April 15, 2004	Palomar	NEAT	·	980 m	MPC · JPL
821193	2015 DR_{128}	—	February 17, 2015	Haleakala	Pan-STARRS 1	·	2.3 km	MPC · JPL
821194	2015 DU_{129}	—	February 17, 2015	Haleakala	Pan-STARRS 1	PHO	770 m	MPC · JPL
821195	2015 DZ_{130}	—	February 17, 2015	Haleakala	Pan-STARRS 1	·	1.5 km	MPC · JPL
821196	2015 DS_{133}	—	November 26, 2013	Mount Lemmon	Mount Lemmon Survey	·	1.9 km	MPC · JPL
821197	2015 DY_{133}	—	February 17, 2015	Haleakala	Pan-STARRS 1	·	1.4 km	MPC · JPL
821198	2015 DB_{135}	—	February 17, 2015	Haleakala	Pan-STARRS 1	H	400 m	MPC · JPL
821199	2015 DV_{135}	—	February 17, 2015	Haleakala	Pan-STARRS 1	critical	1.3 km	MPC · JPL
821200	2015 DN_{140}	—	December 18, 2003	Kitt Peak	Spacewatch	·	950 m	MPC · JPL

== 821201–821300 ==
back to top

Designation			Discovery			Properties		Ref
Permanent	Provisional	Named after	Date	Site	Discoverer(s)	Category	Diam.	Ref
821201	2015 DE_{143}	—	January 17, 2015	Mount Lemmon	Mount Lemmon Survey	·	1.7 km	MPC · JPL
821202	2015 DO_{146}	—	February 9, 2015	XuYi	PMO NEO Survey Program	·	570 m	MPC · JPL
821203	2015 DD_{149}	—	January 17, 2015	Haleakala	Pan-STARRS 1	H	480 m	MPC · JPL
821204	2015 DK_{149}	—	December 10, 2010	Mount Lemmon	Mount Lemmon Survey	·	910 m	MPC · JPL
821205	2015 DN_{157}	—	April 6, 2011	Mount Lemmon	Mount Lemmon Survey	·	1.5 km	MPC · JPL
821206	2015 DB_{158}	—	January 17, 2015	Haleakala	Pan-STARRS 1	·	1.6 km	MPC · JPL
821207	2015 DU_{158}	—	November 10, 2009	Kitt Peak	Spacewatch	·	1.3 km	MPC · JPL
821208	2015 DV_{160}	—	February 18, 2015	Mount Lemmon	Mount Lemmon Survey	·	1.3 km	MPC · JPL
821209	2015 DF_{161}	—	October 12, 2013	Mount Lemmon	Mount Lemmon Survey	·	1.6 km	MPC · JPL
821210	2015 DW_{163}	—	January 21, 2015	Haleakala	Pan-STARRS 1	·	1.4 km	MPC · JPL
821211	2015 DB_{173}	—	January 21, 2015	Haleakala	Pan-STARRS 1	·	3.2 km	MPC · JPL
821212	2015 DH_{173}	—	October 25, 2005	Mount Lemmon	Mount Lemmon Survey	ADE	1.2 km	MPC · JPL
821213	2015 DU_{174}	—	May 5, 2008	Mount Lemmon	Mount Lemmon Survey	PHO	690 m	MPC · JPL
821214	2015 DP_{177}	—	January 13, 2015	Haleakala	Pan-STARRS 1	·	1.3 km	MPC · JPL
821215	2015 DE_{180}	—	March 6, 2011	Kitt Peak	Spacewatch	·	770 m	MPC · JPL
821216	2015 DL_{182}	—	December 17, 2007	Kitt Peak	Spacewatch	·	530 m	MPC · JPL
821217	2015 DW_{186}	—	May 5, 2003	Kitt Peak	Spacewatch	·	1.2 km	MPC · JPL
821218	2015 DR_{187}	—	February 20, 2015	Haleakala	Pan-STARRS 1	·	1.5 km	MPC · JPL
821219	2015 DF_{190}	—	October 3, 2013	Haleakala	Pan-STARRS 1	·	1.6 km	MPC · JPL
821220	2015 DT_{193}	—	September 3, 2013	Calar Alto	F. Hormuth	·	2.7 km	MPC · JPL
821221	2015 DJ_{195}	—	January 11, 2015	Haleakala	Pan-STARRS 1	·	2.3 km	MPC · JPL
821222	2015 DQ_{198}	—	February 15, 2010	Mount Lemmon	Mount Lemmon Survey	H	380 m	MPC · JPL
821223	2015 DY_{199}	—	February 21, 2015	Mount Lemmon	Mount Lemmon Survey	H	540 m	MPC · JPL
821224	2015 DW_{200}	—	February 13, 2007	Mount Lemmon	Mount Lemmon Survey	·	950 m	MPC · JPL
821225	2015 DA_{206}	—	February 23, 2015	Haleakala	Pan-STARRS 1	·	710 m	MPC · JPL
821226	2015 DE_{206}	—	February 23, 2015	Haleakala	Pan-STARRS 1	·	1.3 km	MPC · JPL
821227	2015 DG_{206}	—	January 10, 2008	Kitt Peak	Spacewatch	·	470 m	MPC · JPL
821228	2015 DH_{210}	—	January 28, 2015	Haleakala	Pan-STARRS 1	·	1.9 km	MPC · JPL
821229	2015 DD_{225}	—	January 27, 2015	Haleakala	Pan-STARRS 1	H	420 m	MPC · JPL
821230	2015 DH_{225}	—	October 6, 2008	Kitt Peak	Spacewatch	H	320 m	MPC · JPL
821231	2015 DM_{225}	—	February 18, 2015	Haleakala	Pan-STARRS 1	H	430 m	MPC · JPL
821232	2015 DQ_{230}	—	February 23, 2007	Mount Lemmon	Mount Lemmon Survey	·	1.3 km	MPC · JPL
821233	2015 DN_{233}	—	March 2, 2009	Mount Lemmon	Mount Lemmon Survey	·	2.3 km	MPC · JPL
821234	2015 DV_{237}	—	February 16, 2015	Haleakala	Pan-STARRS 1	·	910 m	MPC · JPL
821235	2015 DN_{245}	—	February 24, 2015	Haleakala	Pan-STARRS 1	·	490 m	MPC · JPL
821236	2015 DQ_{246}	—	August 24, 2011	Haleakala	Pan-STARRS 1	·	2.7 km	MPC · JPL
821237	2015 DO_{247}	—	January 30, 2011	Mount Lemmon	Mount Lemmon Survey	·	780 m	MPC · JPL
821238	2015 DT_{250}	—	April 10, 2005	Kitt Peak	Deep Ecliptic Survey	·	1.5 km	MPC · JPL
821239	2015 DL_{251}	—	March 15, 2016	Haleakala	Pan-STARRS 1	·	2.7 km	MPC · JPL
821240	2015 DP_{251}	—	February 23, 2015	Haleakala	Pan-STARRS 1	·	580 m	MPC · JPL
821241	2015 DT_{252}	—	February 16, 2015	Haleakala	Pan-STARRS 1	·	1.6 km	MPC · JPL
821242	2015 DA_{253}	—	February 17, 2015	Haleakala	Pan-STARRS 1	·	660 m	MPC · JPL
821243	2015 DC_{253}	—	February 24, 2015	Haleakala	Pan-STARRS 1	HNS	670 m	MPC · JPL
821244	2015 DN_{253}	—	February 23, 2015	Haleakala	Pan-STARRS 1	·	2.7 km	MPC · JPL
821245	2015 DQ_{253}	—	February 16, 2015	Haleakala	Pan-STARRS 1	·	570 m	MPC · JPL
821246	2015 DR_{254}	—	August 18, 2011	Haleakala	Pan-STARRS 1	·	2.3 km	MPC · JPL
821247	2015 DU_{256}	—	February 20, 2015	Haleakala	Pan-STARRS 1	EOS	1.3 km	MPC · JPL
821248	2015 DW_{257}	—	February 24, 2015	Haleakala	Pan-STARRS 1	H	310 m	MPC · JPL
821249	2015 DP_{262}	—	July 30, 2017	Haleakala	Pan-STARRS 1	·	2.0 km	MPC · JPL
821250	2015 DM_{266}	—	September 2, 2011	Haleakala	Pan-STARRS 1	·	2.8 km	MPC · JPL
821251	2015 DW_{266}	—	February 27, 2015	Haleakala	Pan-STARRS 1	·	460 m	MPC · JPL
821252	2015 DS_{267}	—	February 16, 2015	Haleakala	Pan-STARRS 1	·	1.3 km	MPC · JPL
821253	2015 DK_{268}	—	February 23, 2015	Haleakala	Pan-STARRS 1	·	2.5 km	MPC · JPL
821254	2015 DY_{268}	—	February 27, 2015	Haleakala	Pan-STARRS 1	BRA	980 m	MPC · JPL
821255	2015 DR_{269}	—	January 14, 2011	Kitt Peak	Spacewatch	·	690 m	MPC · JPL
821256	2015 DT_{269}	—	February 16, 2015	Haleakala	Pan-STARRS 1	·	1.1 km	MPC · JPL
821257	2015 DA_{270}	—	February 27, 2015	Kitt Peak	Spacewatch	·	1.4 km	MPC · JPL
821258	2015 DJ_{270}	—	February 24, 2015	Haleakala	Pan-STARRS 1	·	1.5 km	MPC · JPL
821259	2015 DH_{271}	—	February 20, 2015	Haleakala	Pan-STARRS 1	·	1.6 km	MPC · JPL
821260	2015 DP_{274}	—	February 16, 2015	Haleakala	Pan-STARRS 1	·	430 m	MPC · JPL
821261	2015 DT_{277}	—	February 20, 2015	Haleakala	Pan-STARRS 1	PHO	710 m	MPC · JPL
821262	2015 DX_{277}	—	February 20, 2015	Haleakala	Pan-STARRS 1	TIN	770 m	MPC · JPL
821263	2015 DL_{281}	—	February 20, 2015	Haleakala	Pan-STARRS 1	GEF	870 m	MPC · JPL
821264	2015 DP_{281}	—	February 16, 2015	Haleakala	Pan-STARRS 1	·	560 m	MPC · JPL
821265	2015 DC_{282}	—	February 16, 2015	Haleakala	Pan-STARRS 1	·	490 m	MPC · JPL
821266	2015 DL_{285}	—	January 17, 2015	Haleakala	Pan-STARRS 1	·	1.7 km	MPC · JPL
821267	2015 DX_{293}	—	February 23, 2015	Haleakala	Pan-STARRS 1	EUP	2.4 km	MPC · JPL
821268	2015 DY_{293}	—	November 9, 2013	Mount Lemmon	Mount Lemmon Survey	·	1.3 km	MPC · JPL
821269	2015 DZ_{293}	—	February 16, 2015	Haleakala	Pan-STARRS 1	·	1.4 km	MPC · JPL
821270	2015 DL_{297}	—	February 19, 2015	Haleakala	Pan-STARRS 1	·	1.2 km	MPC · JPL
821271	2015 DW_{300}	—	February 24, 2015	Haleakala	Pan-STARRS 1	·	520 m	MPC · JPL
821272	2015 DX_{300}	—	February 18, 2015	Haleakala	Pan-STARRS 1	·	520 m	MPC · JPL
821273	2015 DB_{302}	—	February 17, 2015	Haleakala	Pan-STARRS 1	V	410 m	MPC · JPL
821274	2015 DO_{303}	—	January 21, 2015	Haleakala	Pan-STARRS 1	·	1.3 km	MPC · JPL
821275	2015 DN_{311}	—	February 27, 2015	Mount Lemmon	Mount Lemmon Survey	·	1.3 km	MPC · JPL
821276	2015 DB_{312}	—	February 17, 2015	Haleakala	Pan-STARRS 1	·	1.6 km	MPC · JPL
821277	2015 DQ_{312}	—	January 22, 2015	Haleakala	Pan-STARRS 1	·	1.3 km	MPC · JPL
821278	2015 DZ_{312}	—	February 17, 2015	Haleakala	Pan-STARRS 1	·	1.6 km	MPC · JPL
821279	2015 DJ_{320}	—	October 20, 2008	Mount Lemmon	Mount Lemmon Survey	·	1.3 km	MPC · JPL
821280	2015 EP_{1}	—	February 2, 2008	Kitt Peak	Spacewatch	·	620 m	MPC · JPL
821281	2015 EP_{5}	—	February 9, 2008	Mount Lemmon	Mount Lemmon Survey	·	540 m	MPC · JPL
821282	2015 ED_{14}	—	January 31, 2006	Kitt Peak	Spacewatch	·	1.1 km	MPC · JPL
821283	2015 EU_{16}	—	January 19, 2015	Mount Lemmon	Mount Lemmon Survey	·	590 m	MPC · JPL
821284	2015 EP_{19}	—	November 21, 2001	Sacramento Peak	SDSS	H	360 m	MPC · JPL
821285	2015 EW_{21}	—	February 15, 2015	Haleakala	Pan-STARRS 1	·	900 m	MPC · JPL
821286	2015 EZ_{21}	—	February 10, 2015	Mount Lemmon	Mount Lemmon Survey	·	520 m	MPC · JPL
821287	2015 EC_{32}	—	April 2, 2011	Kitt Peak	Spacewatch	·	1.1 km	MPC · JPL
821288	2015 ER_{32}	—	October 4, 2013	Calar Alto	S. Hellmich, G. Hahn	·	830 m	MPC · JPL
821289	2015 EP_{34}	—	March 9, 2015	Mount Lemmon	Mount Lemmon Survey	·	460 m	MPC · JPL
821290	2015 EH_{37}	—	November 1, 2013	Mount Lemmon	Mount Lemmon Survey	·	1.3 km	MPC · JPL
821291	2015 EM_{39}	—	November 25, 2013	Haleakala	Pan-STARRS 1	·	990 m	MPC · JPL
821292	2015 EM_{42}	—	February 15, 2015	Haleakala	Pan-STARRS 1	·	540 m	MPC · JPL
821293	2015 EP_{43}	—	January 16, 2015	Haleakala	Pan-STARRS 1	EOS	1.4 km	MPC · JPL
821294	2015 EZ_{43}	—	November 2, 2010	Mount Lemmon	Mount Lemmon Survey	·	540 m	MPC · JPL
821295	2015 ET_{44}	—	February 13, 2015	Westfield	International Astronomical Search Collaboration	·	440 m	MPC · JPL
821296	2015 EM_{47}	—	September 17, 2006	Kitt Peak	Spacewatch	·	510 m	MPC · JPL
821297	2015 EO_{54}	—	January 16, 2015	Haleakala	Pan-STARRS 1	·	790 m	MPC · JPL
821298	2015 EW_{54}	—	March 14, 2015	Haleakala	Pan-STARRS 1	·	2.2 km	MPC · JPL
821299	2015 EV_{56}	—	January 29, 2015	Haleakala	Pan-STARRS 1	·	930 m	MPC · JPL
821300	2015 EN_{59}	—	January 20, 2015	Haleakala	Pan-STARRS 1	·	1.4 km	MPC · JPL

== 821301–821400 ==
back to top

Designation			Discovery			Properties		Ref
Permanent	Provisional	Named after	Date	Site	Discoverer(s)	Category	Diam.	Ref
821301	2015 EP_{64}	—	January 19, 2015	Haleakala	Pan-STARRS 1	·	1.2 km	MPC · JPL
821302	2015 EQ_{68}	—	February 16, 2015	Haleakala	Pan-STARRS 1	ADE	1.2 km	MPC · JPL
821303	2015 EX_{69}	—	August 17, 2013	Haleakala	Pan-STARRS 1	H	340 m	MPC · JPL
821304	2015 EA_{71}	—	March 14, 2015	Haleakala	Pan-STARRS 1	EOS	1.3 km	MPC · JPL
821305	2015 EB_{71}	—	September 25, 2013	Mount Lemmon	Mount Lemmon Survey	·	1.2 km	MPC · JPL
821306	2015 EU_{75}	—	March 1, 2015	Haleakala	Pan-STARRS 1	·	810 m	MPC · JPL
821307	2015 ED_{79}	—	February 28, 2006	Mount Lemmon	Mount Lemmon Survey	·	1.3 km	MPC · JPL
821308	2015 EH_{84}	—	March 15, 2015	Haleakala	Pan-STARRS 1	·	1.4 km	MPC · JPL
821309	2015 FV_{2}	—	January 16, 2015	Haleakala	Pan-STARRS 1	H	390 m	MPC · JPL
821310	2015 FP_{3}	—	November 25, 2014	Haleakala	Pan-STARRS 1	H	430 m	MPC · JPL
821311	2015 FA_{4}	—	January 8, 2015	Haleakala	Pan-STARRS 1	H	450 m	MPC · JPL
821312	2015 FU_{7}	—	January 20, 2015	Haleakala	Pan-STARRS 1	AGN	780 m	MPC · JPL
821313	2015 FN_{15}	—	March 16, 2015	Haleakala	Pan-STARRS 1	·	1.2 km	MPC · JPL
821314	2015 FE_{18}	—	March 16, 2015	Haleakala	Pan-STARRS 1	·	1.2 km	MPC · JPL
821315	2015 FK_{18}	—	March 16, 2015	Haleakala	Pan-STARRS 1	·	2.1 km	MPC · JPL
821316	2015 FY_{21}	—	October 18, 2012	Haleakala	Pan-STARRS 1	·	1.4 km	MPC · JPL
821317	2015 FJ_{26}	—	March 16, 2015	Haleakala	Pan-STARRS 1	·	1.4 km	MPC · JPL
821318	2015 FM_{26}	—	March 16, 2015	Haleakala	Pan-STARRS 1	ARM	2.6 km	MPC · JPL
821319	2015 FS_{28}	—	March 16, 2015	Haleakala	Pan-STARRS 1	GAL	1.0 km	MPC · JPL
821320	2015 FT_{34}	—	April 8, 2003	Kitt Peak	Spacewatch	H	280 m	MPC · JPL
821321	2015 FP_{38}	—	February 14, 2015	Mount Lemmon	Mount Lemmon Survey	·	870 m	MPC · JPL
821322	2015 FB_{39}	—	November 22, 2009	Kitt Peak	Spacewatch	·	1 km	MPC · JPL
821323	2015 FQ_{44}	—	January 31, 2011	Westfield	International Astronomical Search Collaboration	·	670 m	MPC · JPL
821324	2015 FR_{44}	—	May 8, 2005	Kitt Peak	Spacewatch	·	440 m	MPC · JPL
821325	2015 FG_{45}	—	January 15, 2011	Mount Lemmon	Mount Lemmon Survey	·	650 m	MPC · JPL
821326	2015 FH_{46}	—	February 7, 2008	Mount Lemmon	Mount Lemmon Survey	·	760 m	MPC · JPL
821327	2015 FO_{47}	—	October 7, 2013	Mount Lemmon	Mount Lemmon Survey	·	1.7 km	MPC · JPL
821328	2015 FC_{50}	—	April 1, 2012	Mount Lemmon	Mount Lemmon Survey	·	480 m	MPC · JPL
821329	2015 FU_{50}	—	March 18, 2015	Haleakala	Pan-STARRS 1	AGN	890 m	MPC · JPL
821330	2015 FF_{52}	—	December 17, 2014	Haleakala	Pan-STARRS 1	·	1.0 km	MPC · JPL
821331	2015 FA_{54}	—	October 14, 2013	Kitt Peak	Spacewatch	URS	2.4 km	MPC · JPL
821332	2015 FX_{55}	—	August 9, 2013	Catalina	CSS	PHO	780 m	MPC · JPL
821333	2015 FK_{59}	—	October 18, 2009	Mount Lemmon	Mount Lemmon Survey	·	990 m	MPC · JPL
821334	2015 FH_{60}	—	March 18, 2015	Haleakala	Pan-STARRS 1	PHO	670 m	MPC · JPL
821335	2015 FA_{61}	—	January 24, 2015	Haleakala	Pan-STARRS 1	BRG	1.1 km	MPC · JPL
821336	2015 FA_{66}	—	December 4, 2013	Haleakala	Pan-STARRS 1	·	3.0 km	MPC · JPL
821337	2015 FT_{67}	—	March 17, 2015	Haleakala	Pan-STARRS 1	·	820 m	MPC · JPL
821338	2015 FD_{70}	—	January 28, 2015	Haleakala	Pan-STARRS 1	H	380 m	MPC · JPL
821339	2015 FV_{70}	—	March 18, 2015	Haleakala	Pan-STARRS 1	EUP	2.9 km	MPC · JPL
821340	2015 FV_{74}	—	March 18, 2015	Haleakala	Pan-STARRS 1	NYS	910 m	MPC · JPL
821341	2015 FV_{75}	—	October 12, 2002	Kitt Peak	Spacewatch	H	600 m	MPC · JPL
821342	2015 FT_{78}	—	March 17, 2015	Haleakala	Pan-STARRS 1	·	810 m	MPC · JPL
821343	2015 FF_{83}	—	March 20, 2015	Haleakala	Pan-STARRS 1	H	370 m	MPC · JPL
821344	2015 FK_{83}	—	January 23, 2015	Haleakala	Pan-STARRS 1	HNS	900 m	MPC · JPL
821345	2015 FN_{84}	—	February 20, 2015	Haleakala	Pan-STARRS 1	·	1.1 km	MPC · JPL
821346	2015 FU_{89}	—	February 24, 2015	Haleakala	Pan-STARRS 1	·	540 m	MPC · JPL
821347	2015 FH_{92}	—	January 26, 2015	Haleakala	Pan-STARRS 1	·	1.6 km	MPC · JPL
821348	2015 FO_{103}	—	January 22, 2015	Haleakala	Pan-STARRS 1	·	510 m	MPC · JPL
821349	2015 FE_{106}	—	March 20, 2015	Haleakala	Pan-STARRS 1	·	460 m	MPC · JPL
821350	2015 FG_{118}	—	March 25, 2015	Haleakala	Pan-STARRS 1	H	280 m	MPC · JPL
821351	2015 FD_{120}	—	September 27, 2008	Siding Spring	SSS	H	390 m	MPC · JPL
821352	2015 FF_{122}	—	February 5, 2011	Mount Lemmon	Mount Lemmon Survey	NYS	820 m	MPC · JPL
821353	2015 FK_{130}	—	January 14, 2015	Haleakala	Pan-STARRS 1	H	370 m	MPC · JPL
821354	2015 FJ_{134}	—	March 16, 2015	Mount Lemmon	Mount Lemmon Survey	·	490 m	MPC · JPL
821355	2015 FK_{135}	—	May 20, 2012	Haleakala	Pan-STARRS 1	·	540 m	MPC · JPL
821356	2015 FT_{136}	—	February 25, 2015	Haleakala	Pan-STARRS 1	·	1.5 km	MPC · JPL
821357	2015 FY_{138}	—	March 21, 2015	Haleakala	Pan-STARRS 1	·	550 m	MPC · JPL
821358	2015 FL_{147}	—	March 16, 2015	Kitt Peak	Spacewatch	·	510 m	MPC · JPL
821359	2015 FT_{148}	—	March 21, 2015	Haleakala	Pan-STARRS 1	·	540 m	MPC · JPL
821360	2015 FY_{148}	—	April 2, 2011	Haleakala	Pan-STARRS 1	·	830 m	MPC · JPL
821361	2015 FE_{151}	—	March 17, 2015	Kitt Peak	Spacewatch	·	890 m	MPC · JPL
821362	2015 FV_{155}	—	September 17, 2006	Kitt Peak	Spacewatch	·	530 m	MPC · JPL
821363	2015 FT_{157}	—	March 21, 2015	Haleakala	Pan-STARRS 1	HNS	750 m	MPC · JPL
821364	2015 FX_{158}	—	July 28, 2009	Kitt Peak	Spacewatch	T_{j} (2.95)	3.9 km	MPC · JPL
821365	2015 FM_{159}	—	January 23, 2015	Haleakala	Pan-STARRS 1	·	1.2 km	MPC · JPL
821366	2015 FJ_{161}	—	January 23, 2015	Haleakala	Pan-STARRS 1	·	550 m	MPC · JPL
821367	2015 FZ_{161}	—	March 17, 2015	Kitt Peak	Spacewatch	·	1.1 km	MPC · JPL
821368	2015 FJ_{162}	—	January 23, 2015	Haleakala	Pan-STARRS 1	·	520 m	MPC · JPL
821369	2015 FN_{167}	—	March 21, 2015	Haleakala	Pan-STARRS 1	MAS	650 m	MPC · JPL
821370	2015 FL_{172}	—	February 23, 2015	Haleakala	Pan-STARRS 1	·	530 m	MPC · JPL
821371	2015 FU_{172}	—	August 16, 2009	Kitt Peak	Spacewatch	·	430 m	MPC · JPL
821372	2015 FX_{172}	—	January 23, 2015	Haleakala	Pan-STARRS 1	·	1.0 km	MPC · JPL
821373	2015 FD_{174}	—	April 2, 2011	Mount Lemmon	Mount Lemmon Survey	·	1.0 km	MPC · JPL
821374	2015 FG_{175}	—	March 21, 2015	Haleakala	Pan-STARRS 1	·	520 m	MPC · JPL
821375	2015 FF_{176}	—	August 29, 2013	Haleakala	Pan-STARRS 1	H	350 m	MPC · JPL
821376	2015 FY_{179}	—	February 27, 2015	Haleakala	Pan-STARRS 1	·	810 m	MPC · JPL
821377	2015 FE_{180}	—	February 28, 2008	Mount Lemmon	Mount Lemmon Survey	·	520 m	MPC · JPL
821378	2015 FX_{180}	—	January 23, 2015	Haleakala	Pan-STARRS 1	·	510 m	MPC · JPL
821379	2015 FK_{185}	—	March 22, 2015	Mount Lemmon	Mount Lemmon Survey	·	1.0 km	MPC · JPL
821380	2015 FR_{187}	—	March 16, 2015	Catalina	CSS	·	820 m	MPC · JPL
821381	2015 FB_{191}	—	March 22, 2015	Haleakala	Pan-STARRS 1	TIR	2.0 km	MPC · JPL
821382	2015 FO_{194}	—	October 11, 2010	Piszkés-tető	K. Sárneczky, G. Mező	·	560 m	MPC · JPL
821383	2015 FO_{198}	—	February 24, 2015	Haleakala	Pan-STARRS 1	·	580 m	MPC · JPL
821384	2015 FB_{199}	—	April 5, 2011	Mount Lemmon	Mount Lemmon Survey	·	690 m	MPC · JPL
821385	2015 FC_{199}	—	March 22, 2015	Haleakala	Pan-STARRS 1	·	1.4 km	MPC · JPL
821386	2015 FE_{202}	—	February 11, 2015	Mount Lemmon	Mount Lemmon Survey	·	520 m	MPC · JPL
821387	2015 FX_{202}	—	October 9, 2005	Kitt Peak	Spacewatch	·	660 m	MPC · JPL
821388	2015 FG_{205}	—	January 23, 2015	Haleakala	Pan-STARRS 1	·	600 m	MPC · JPL
821389	2015 FH_{211}	—	October 1, 2005	Kitt Peak	Spacewatch	H	370 m	MPC · JPL
821390	2015 FV_{215}	—	January 21, 2015	Haleakala	Pan-STARRS 1	(1547)	1.3 km	MPC · JPL
821391	2015 FP_{217}	—	February 27, 2015	Haleakala	Pan-STARRS 1	·	500 m	MPC · JPL
821392	2015 FH_{219}	—	October 13, 2013	Kitt Peak	Spacewatch	·	850 m	MPC · JPL
821393	2015 FX_{221}	—	November 11, 2010	Kitt Peak	Spacewatch	·	550 m	MPC · JPL
821394	2015 FG_{229}	—	March 23, 2015	Haleakala	Pan-STARRS 1	·	1.4 km	MPC · JPL
821395	2015 FE_{233}	—	March 23, 2015	Haleakala	Pan-STARRS 1	·	1.2 km	MPC · JPL
821396	2015 FQ_{234}	—	March 11, 2008	Kitt Peak	Spacewatch	·	510 m	MPC · JPL
821397	2015 FZ_{236}	—	April 1, 2008	Kitt Peak	Spacewatch	·	630 m	MPC · JPL
821398	2015 FN_{237}	—	January 23, 2015	Haleakala	Pan-STARRS 1	·	2.2 km	MPC · JPL
821399	2015 FH_{238}	—	January 21, 2015	Haleakala	Pan-STARRS 1	·	2.1 km	MPC · JPL
821400	2015 FQ_{238}	—	February 7, 2008	Kitt Peak	Spacewatch	·	570 m	MPC · JPL

== 821401–821500 ==
back to top

Designation			Discovery			Properties		Ref
Permanent	Provisional	Named after	Date	Site	Discoverer(s)	Category	Diam.	Ref
821401	2015 FP_{242}	—	March 23, 2015	Haleakala	Pan-STARRS 1	V	430 m	MPC · JPL
821402	2015 FN_{243}	—	November 27, 2013	Haleakala	Pan-STARRS 1	·	1.4 km	MPC · JPL
821403	2015 FL_{244}	—	January 21, 2015	Haleakala	Pan-STARRS 1	·	530 m	MPC · JPL
821404	2015 FQ_{250}	—	March 23, 2015	Haleakala	Pan-STARRS 1	·	590 m	MPC · JPL
821405	2015 FL_{253}	—	March 23, 2015	Haleakala	Pan-STARRS 1	·	1.8 km	MPC · JPL
821406	2015 FX_{258}	—	April 20, 2007	Kitt Peak	Spacewatch	·	1.1 km	MPC · JPL
821407	2015 FY_{258}	—	March 24, 2015	Haleakala	Pan-STARRS 1	·	890 m	MPC · JPL
821408	2015 FQ_{259}	—	March 24, 2015	Haleakala	Pan-STARRS 1	·	480 m	MPC · JPL
821409	2015 FC_{261}	—	February 17, 2015	Haleakala	Pan-STARRS 1	·	650 m	MPC · JPL
821410	2015 FG_{261}	—	March 28, 2008	Mount Lemmon	Mount Lemmon Survey	NYS	810 m	MPC · JPL
821411	2015 FT_{261}	—	February 16, 2015	Haleakala	Pan-STARRS 1	EUN	760 m	MPC · JPL
821412	2015 FO_{270}	—	February 16, 2015	Haleakala	Pan-STARRS 1	·	1.4 km	MPC · JPL
821413	2015 FA_{275}	—	December 17, 2003	Kitt Peak	Spacewatch	·	610 m	MPC · JPL
821414	2015 FU_{276}	—	September 14, 2013	Haleakala	Pan-STARRS 1	·	540 m	MPC · JPL
821415	2015 FO_{278}	—	March 24, 2015	Haleakala	Pan-STARRS 1	AGN	850 m	MPC · JPL
821416	2015 FK_{281}	—	February 16, 2015	Haleakala	Pan-STARRS 1	·	1.7 km	MPC · JPL
821417	2015 FM_{283}	—	October 17, 2010	Mount Lemmon	Mount Lemmon Survey	·	520 m	MPC · JPL
821418	2015 FZ_{288}	—	February 17, 2015	Haleakala	Pan-STARRS 1	·	1.0 km	MPC · JPL
821419	2015 FC_{290}	—	March 28, 2015	Haleakala	Pan-STARRS 1	H	370 m	MPC · JPL
821420	2015 FR_{290}	—	January 28, 2015	Haleakala	Pan-STARRS 1	·	570 m	MPC · JPL
821421	2015 FG_{295}	—	November 11, 2013	Kitt Peak	Spacewatch	·	1.4 km	MPC · JPL
821422	2015 FQ_{296}	—	March 28, 2015	Haleakala	Pan-STARRS 1	·	1.0 km	MPC · JPL
821423	2015 FV_{301}	—	March 28, 2015	Haleakala	Pan-STARRS 1	·	590 m	MPC · JPL
821424	2015 FJ_{303}	—	September 28, 2011	Kitt Peak	Spacewatch	·	2.6 km	MPC · JPL
821425	2015 FS_{303}	—	August 29, 2013	Haleakala	Pan-STARRS 1	H	330 m	MPC · JPL
821426	2015 FU_{307}	—	March 23, 2015	Haleakala	Pan-STARRS 1	·	950 m	MPC · JPL
821427	2015 FH_{308}	—	March 16, 2015	Mount Lemmon	Mount Lemmon Survey	·	2.1 km	MPC · JPL
821428	2015 FF_{309}	—	January 21, 2015	Haleakala	Pan-STARRS 1	·	480 m	MPC · JPL
821429	2015 FP_{309}	—	March 25, 2015	Haleakala	Pan-STARRS 1	·	890 m	MPC · JPL
821430	2015 FP_{313}	—	May 28, 2012	Mount Lemmon	Mount Lemmon Survey	·	530 m	MPC · JPL
821431	2015 FW_{316}	—	November 8, 2013	Mount Lemmon	Mount Lemmon Survey	·	610 m	MPC · JPL
821432	2015 FL_{317}	—	March 25, 2015	Haleakala	Pan-STARRS 1	HOF	1.8 km	MPC · JPL
821433	2015 FD_{320}	—	March 25, 2015	Haleakala	Pan-STARRS 1	·	650 m	MPC · JPL
821434	2015 FS_{322}	—	March 25, 2015	Haleakala	Pan-STARRS 1	·	600 m	MPC · JPL
821435	2015 FR_{324}	—	March 25, 2015	Haleakala	Pan-STARRS 1	·	1.3 km	MPC · JPL
821436	2015 FC_{325}	—	March 25, 2015	Haleakala	Pan-STARRS 1	·	2.5 km	MPC · JPL
821437	2015 FB_{328}	—	November 10, 2013	Mount Lemmon	Mount Lemmon Survey	·	620 m	MPC · JPL
821438	2015 FD_{328}	—	March 25, 2015	Haleakala	Pan-STARRS 1	·	410 m	MPC · JPL
821439	2015 FJ_{333}	—	January 25, 2015	Haleakala	Pan-STARRS 1	JUN	860 m	MPC · JPL
821440	2015 FR_{333}	—	March 21, 2015	Haleakala	Pan-STARRS 1	MIS	1.8 km	MPC · JPL
821441	2015 FX_{333}	—	March 30, 2015	Haleakala	Pan-STARRS 1	·	410 m	MPC · JPL
821442	2015 FL_{334}	—	March 30, 2015	Haleakala	Pan-STARRS 1	·	870 m	MPC · JPL
821443	2015 FQ_{341}	—	November 27, 2014	Haleakala	Pan-STARRS 1	·	1.1 km	MPC · JPL
821444	2015 FQ_{346}	—	January 14, 2015	Haleakala	Pan-STARRS 1	·	3.0 km	MPC · JPL
821445	2015 FD_{352}	—	September 23, 2011	Haleakala	Pan-STARRS 1	H	330 m	MPC · JPL
821446	2015 FM_{355}	—	March 17, 2015	Haleakala	Pan-STARRS 1	·	630 m	MPC · JPL
821447	2015 FW_{355}	—	March 28, 2008	Mount Lemmon	Mount Lemmon Survey	·	500 m	MPC · JPL
821448	2015 FD_{362}	—	March 17, 2015	Haleakala	Pan-STARRS 1	·	560 m	MPC · JPL
821449	2015 FM_{363}	—	October 24, 2013	Mount Lemmon	Mount Lemmon Survey	AGN	930 m	MPC · JPL
821450	2015 FU_{363}	—	July 14, 2013	Haleakala	Pan-STARRS 1	·	500 m	MPC · JPL
821451	2015 FL_{366}	—	January 20, 2015	Haleakala	Pan-STARRS 1	HNS	720 m	MPC · JPL
821452	2015 FJ_{369}	—	February 20, 2015	Haleakala	Pan-STARRS 1	·	1.4 km	MPC · JPL
821453	2015 FU_{373}	—	September 6, 2008	Mount Lemmon	Mount Lemmon Survey	H	260 m	MPC · JPL
821454	2015 FZ_{374}	—	March 18, 2015	Haleakala	Pan-STARRS 1	H	540 m	MPC · JPL
821455	2015 FH_{375}	—	January 15, 2015	Haleakala	Pan-STARRS 1	H	360 m	MPC · JPL
821456	2015 FV_{377}	—	March 20, 2015	Haleakala	Pan-STARRS 1	H	380 m	MPC · JPL
821457	2015 FR_{378}	—	February 20, 2015	Haleakala	Pan-STARRS 1	·	1.3 km	MPC · JPL
821458	2015 FH_{382}	—	February 23, 2015	Haleakala	Pan-STARRS 1	H	260 m	MPC · JPL
821459	2015 FV_{382}	—	March 29, 2004	Kitt Peak	Spacewatch	TIR	2.2 km	MPC · JPL
821460	2015 FW_{382}	—	December 31, 2007	Kitt Peak	Spacewatch	·	580 m	MPC · JPL
821461	2015 FH_{388}	—	November 7, 2012	Mount Lemmon	Mount Lemmon Survey	·	900 m	MPC · JPL
821462	2015 FA_{390}	—	January 22, 2015	Haleakala	Pan-STARRS 1	·	480 m	MPC · JPL
821463	2015 FB_{394}	—	September 3, 2013	Haleakala	Pan-STARRS 1	H	320 m	MPC · JPL
821464	2015 FJ_{394}	—	March 19, 2015	Haleakala	Pan-STARRS 1	H	360 m	MPC · JPL
821465	2015 FJ_{405}	—	March 21, 2015	Haleakala	Pan-STARRS 1	·	1.1 km	MPC · JPL
821466	2015 FP_{405}	—	March 28, 2015	Haleakala	Pan-STARRS 1	THB	2.3 km	MPC · JPL
821467	2015 FW_{412}	—	March 29, 2015	Haleakala	Pan-STARRS 1	·	1.4 km	MPC · JPL
821468	2015 FB_{414}	—	March 30, 2015	Haleakala	Pan-STARRS 1	·	1.3 km	MPC · JPL
821469	2015 FJ_{416}	—	March 22, 2015	Haleakala	Pan-STARRS 1	·	1.5 km	MPC · JPL
821470	2015 FK_{416}	—	March 19, 2015	Haleakala	Pan-STARRS 1	·	1.7 km	MPC · JPL
821471	2015 FS_{416}	—	July 5, 2016	Haleakala	Pan-STARRS 1	V	510 m	MPC · JPL
821472	2015 FP_{417}	—	March 29, 2015	Kitt Peak	Spacewatch	·	460 m	MPC · JPL
821473	2015 FU_{418}	—	March 31, 2015	Haleakala	Pan-STARRS 1	·	740 m	MPC · JPL
821474	2015 FS_{420}	—	March 30, 2015	Haleakala	Pan-STARRS 1	·	560 m	MPC · JPL
821475	2015 FV_{420}	—	March 22, 2015	Haleakala	Pan-STARRS 1	·	1.1 km	MPC · JPL
821476	2015 FA_{423}	—	March 17, 2015	Haleakala	Pan-STARRS 1	LIX	2.7 km	MPC · JPL
821477	2015 FJ_{426}	—	March 22, 2015	Haleakala	Pan-STARRS 1	·	1.4 km	MPC · JPL
821478	2015 FG_{428}	—	March 22, 2015	Haleakala	Pan-STARRS 1	·	1.5 km	MPC · JPL
821479	2015 FH_{428}	—	March 20, 2015	Haleakala	Pan-STARRS 1	(2076)	610 m	MPC · JPL
821480	2015 FJ_{429}	—	March 21, 2015	Haleakala	Pan-STARRS 1	·	1.4 km	MPC · JPL
821481	2015 FH_{430}	—	March 24, 2015	Mount Lemmon	Mount Lemmon Survey	·	2.4 km	MPC · JPL
821482	2015 FW_{430}	—	March 23, 2015	Haleakala	Pan-STARRS 1	(883)	490 m	MPC · JPL
821483	2015 FY_{431}	—	March 17, 2015	Haleakala	Pan-STARRS 1	BRA	970 m	MPC · JPL
821484	2015 FB_{432}	—	March 22, 2015	Haleakala	Pan-STARRS 1	·	1.3 km	MPC · JPL
821485	2015 FP_{432}	—	March 17, 2015	Mount Lemmon	Mount Lemmon Survey	·	1.4 km	MPC · JPL
821486	2015 FV_{433}	—	March 26, 2015	Mount Lemmon	Mount Lemmon Survey	·	670 m	MPC · JPL
821487	2015 FP_{440}	—	March 17, 2015	Haleakala	Pan-STARRS 1	H	240 m	MPC · JPL
821488	2015 FS_{442}	—	March 27, 2015	Kitt Peak	Spacewatch	·	520 m	MPC · JPL
821489	2015 FU_{443}	—	January 26, 2015	Haleakala	Pan-STARRS 1	·	2.2 km	MPC · JPL
821490	2015 FA_{445}	—	March 22, 2015	Haleakala	Pan-STARRS 1	·	2.1 km	MPC · JPL
821491	2015 FL_{447}	—	March 21, 2015	Haleakala	Pan-STARRS 1	·	1.3 km	MPC · JPL
821492	2015 FJ_{448}	—	March 29, 2015	Haleakala	Pan-STARRS 1	AGN	960 m	MPC · JPL
821493	2015 FZ_{450}	—	March 17, 2015	Haleakala	Pan-STARRS 1	·	570 m	MPC · JPL
821494	2015 FV_{453}	—	March 17, 2015	Haleakala	Pan-STARRS 1	·	510 m	MPC · JPL
821495	2015 FD_{455}	—	March 17, 2015	Mount Lemmon	Mount Lemmon Survey	·	1.4 km	MPC · JPL
821496	2015 FT_{455}	—	March 30, 2015	Haleakala	Pan-STARRS 1	NYS	690 m	MPC · JPL
821497	2015 FY_{455}	—	March 19, 2015	Haleakala	Pan-STARRS 1	·	1.0 km	MPC · JPL
821498	2015 FO_{456}	—	January 24, 2007	Mount Lemmon	Mount Lemmon Survey	·	890 m	MPC · JPL
821499	2015 FB_{459}	—	March 22, 2015	Haleakala	Pan-STARRS 1	·	880 m	MPC · JPL
821500	2015 FS_{459}	—	March 17, 2015	Haleakala	Pan-STARRS 1	·	440 m	MPC · JPL

== 821501–821600 ==
back to top

Designation			Discovery			Properties		Ref
Permanent	Provisional	Named after	Date	Site	Discoverer(s)	Category	Diam.	Ref
821501	2015 FS_{463}	—	March 19, 2015	Haleakala	Pan-STARRS 1	·	710 m	MPC · JPL
821502	2015 FS_{467}	—	March 17, 2015	Mount Lemmon	Mount Lemmon Survey	·	1.2 km	MPC · JPL
821503	2015 FK_{468}	—	March 29, 2015	Haleakala	Pan-STARRS 1	·	510 m	MPC · JPL
821504	2015 FM_{472}	—	February 3, 2008	Mount Lemmon	Mount Lemmon Survey	·	520 m	MPC · JPL
821505	2015 GQ	—	March 18, 2015	Haleakala	Pan-STARRS 1	H	300 m	MPC · JPL
821506	2015 GK_{5}	—	May 13, 2008	Mount Lemmon	Mount Lemmon Survey	·	530 m	MPC · JPL
821507	2015 GR_{12}	—	April 10, 2015	Mount Lemmon	Mount Lemmon Survey	H	330 m	MPC · JPL
821508	2015 GR_{16}	—	January 14, 2011	Mount Lemmon	Mount Lemmon Survey	·	560 m	MPC · JPL
821509	2015 GS_{19}	—	September 14, 2006	Kitt Peak	Spacewatch	·	570 m	MPC · JPL
821510	2015 GB_{20}	—	March 17, 2015	Mount Lemmon	Mount Lemmon Survey	·	1.2 km	MPC · JPL
821511	2015 GM_{27}	—	August 9, 2005	Cerro Tololo	Deep Ecliptic Survey	·	800 m	MPC · JPL
821512	2015 GK_{36}	—	January 1, 2014	Haleakala	Pan-STARRS 1	·	1.4 km	MPC · JPL
821513	2015 GA_{37}	—	February 8, 2011	Mount Lemmon	Mount Lemmon Survey	·	850 m	MPC · JPL
821514	2015 GR_{37}	—	August 10, 2012	Kitt Peak	Spacewatch	·	930 m	MPC · JPL
821515	2015 GJ_{38}	—	March 27, 2015	Haleakala	Pan-STARRS 1	·	510 m	MPC · JPL
821516	2015 GM_{40}	—	October 21, 2006	Mount Lemmon	Mount Lemmon Survey	·	600 m	MPC · JPL
821517	2015 GO_{40}	—	January 25, 2015	Haleakala	Pan-STARRS 1	·	970 m	MPC · JPL
821518	2015 GU_{40}	—	April 15, 2015	Haleakala	Pan-STARRS 1	·	620 m	MPC · JPL
821519	2015 GC_{43}	—	April 15, 2015	Haleakala	Pan-STARRS 1	·	570 m	MPC · JPL
821520	2015 GN_{44}	—	January 23, 2015	Haleakala	Pan-STARRS 1	·	850 m	MPC · JPL
821521	2015 GY_{44}	—	April 29, 2008	Kitt Peak	Spacewatch	·	800 m	MPC · JPL
821522	2015 GJ_{45}	—	March 9, 2011	Mount Lemmon	Mount Lemmon Survey	·	860 m	MPC · JPL
821523	2015 GJ_{46}	—	April 11, 2015	WISE	WISE	T_{j} (2.7) · APO	490 m	MPC · JPL
821524	2015 GC_{48}	—	November 9, 2013	Haleakala	Pan-STARRS 1	·	630 m	MPC · JPL
821525	2015 GZ_{49}	—	March 25, 2015	Haleakala	Pan-STARRS 1	·	1.2 km	MPC · JPL
821526	2015 GY_{50}	—	April 10, 2015	Haleakala	Pan-STARRS 1	H	340 m	MPC · JPL
821527	2015 GS_{60}	—	April 13, 2015	Haleakala	Pan-STARRS 1	·	1.2 km	MPC · JPL
821528	2015 GK_{61}	—	August 28, 2016	Mount Lemmon	Mount Lemmon Survey	·	750 m	MPC · JPL
821529	2015 GO_{61}	—	April 1, 2015	Haleakala	Pan-STARRS 1	THB	2.6 km	MPC · JPL
821530	2015 GH_{62}	—	April 10, 2015	Cerro Paranal	Gaia Ground Based Optical Tracking	·	500 m	MPC · JPL
821531	2015 GK_{62}	—	April 15, 2015	Mount Lemmon	Mount Lemmon Survey	H	340 m	MPC · JPL
821532	2015 GO_{62}	—	April 15, 2015	Mount Lemmon	Mount Lemmon Survey	·	1.2 km	MPC · JPL
821533	2015 GU_{62}	—	April 14, 2015	Cerro Paranal	Gaia Ground Based Optical Tracking	H	290 m	MPC · JPL
821534	2015 GX_{63}	—	April 9, 2015	Mount Lemmon	Mount Lemmon Survey	·	540 m	MPC · JPL
821535	2015 GK_{64}	—	April 11, 2015	Mount Lemmon	Mount Lemmon Survey	·	520 m	MPC · JPL
821536	2015 GV_{64}	—	April 13, 2015	Haleakala	Pan-STARRS 1	·	1.2 km	MPC · JPL
821537	2015 GF_{65}	—	April 12, 2015	Haleakala	Pan-STARRS 1	·	1.9 km	MPC · JPL
821538	2015 GL_{66}	—	April 10, 2015	Haleakala	Pan-STARRS 1	·	2.0 km	MPC · JPL
821539	2015 GE_{67}	—	April 9, 2015	Mount Lemmon	Mount Lemmon Survey	·	720 m	MPC · JPL
821540	2015 HC_{2}	—	January 19, 2015	Haleakala	Pan-STARRS 1	·	1.5 km	MPC · JPL
821541	2015 HB_{3}	—	January 22, 2015	Haleakala	Pan-STARRS 1	·	940 m	MPC · JPL
821542	2015 HZ_{3}	—	April 10, 2015	Haleakala	Pan-STARRS 1	·	480 m	MPC · JPL
821543	2015 HQ_{4}	—	January 20, 2015	Haleakala	Pan-STARRS 1	·	1.7 km	MPC · JPL
821544	2015 HW_{5}	—	January 28, 2015	Haleakala	Pan-STARRS 1	·	540 m	MPC · JPL
821545	2015 HA_{7}	—	March 24, 2015	Haleakala	Pan-STARRS 1	·	570 m	MPC · JPL
821546	2015 HX_{8}	—	February 13, 2011	Mount Lemmon	Mount Lemmon Survey	·	900 m	MPC · JPL
821547	2015 HM_{9}	—	March 22, 2015	Haleakala	Pan-STARRS 1	H	300 m	MPC · JPL
821548	2015 HL_{12}	—	August 29, 2006	Kitt Peak	Spacewatch	·	550 m	MPC · JPL
821549	2015 HN_{12}	—	July 25, 2008	Mount Lemmon	Mount Lemmon Survey	·	780 m	MPC · JPL
821550	2015 HR_{13}	—	October 1, 2008	Catalina	CSS	·	1.5 km	MPC · JPL
821551	2015 HW_{13}	—	March 21, 2015	Haleakala	Pan-STARRS 1	·	520 m	MPC · JPL
821552	2015 HJ_{17}	—	January 27, 2011	Mount Lemmon	Mount Lemmon Survey	MAS	610 m	MPC · JPL
821553	2015 HY_{21}	—	March 21, 2015	Haleakala	Pan-STARRS 1	·	520 m	MPC · JPL
821554	2015 HB_{23}	—	March 21, 2015	Haleakala	Pan-STARRS 1	·	520 m	MPC · JPL
821555	2015 HE_{25}	—	August 17, 2012	Haleakala	Pan-STARRS 1	·	720 m	MPC · JPL
821556	2015 HH_{29}	—	April 1, 2008	Kitt Peak	Spacewatch	·	630 m	MPC · JPL
821557	2015 HK_{30}	—	March 30, 2008	Kitt Peak	Spacewatch	·	560 m	MPC · JPL
821558	2015 HB_{33}	—	March 17, 2015	Haleakala	Pan-STARRS 1	·	1.0 km	MPC · JPL
821559	2015 HV_{33}	—	March 17, 2015	Haleakala	Pan-STARRS 1	·	2.8 km	MPC · JPL
821560	2015 HY_{33}	—	March 31, 2015	Kitt Peak	Spacewatch	NYS	690 m	MPC · JPL
821561	2015 HN_{44}	—	January 11, 2008	Kitt Peak	Spacewatch	·	460 m	MPC · JPL
821562	2015 HK_{45}	—	March 25, 2015	Haleakala	Pan-STARRS 1	·	1.4 km	MPC · JPL
821563	2015 HX_{45}	—	October 22, 2003	Sacramento Peak	SDSS	·	550 m	MPC · JPL
821564	2015 HP_{46}	—	April 16, 2015	Haleakala	Pan-STARRS 1	·	560 m	MPC · JPL
821565	2015 HJ_{48}	—	April 4, 2011	Kitt Peak	Spacewatch	·	1.1 km	MPC · JPL
821566	2015 HO_{52}	—	April 16, 2015	Haleakala	Pan-STARRS 1	·	1.4 km	MPC · JPL
821567	2015 HC_{53}	—	April 16, 2015	Haleakala	Pan-STARRS 1	·	1.4 km	MPC · JPL
821568	2015 HM_{53}	—	April 7, 2008	Mount Lemmon	Mount Lemmon Survey	·	740 m	MPC · JPL
821569	2015 HO_{61}	—	March 5, 2008	Mount Lemmon	Mount Lemmon Survey	·	480 m	MPC · JPL
821570	2015 HK_{64}	—	April 23, 2015	Haleakala	Pan-STARRS 1	·	750 m	MPC · JPL
821571	2015 HG_{71}	—	September 26, 2006	Mount Lemmon	Mount Lemmon Survey	·	500 m	MPC · JPL
821572	2015 HZ_{71}	—	April 23, 2015	Haleakala	Pan-STARRS 1	·	2.4 km	MPC · JPL
821573	2015 HU_{72}	—	October 3, 2013	Haleakala	Pan-STARRS 1	·	460 m	MPC · JPL
821574	2015 HE_{76}	—	October 16, 2012	Mount Lemmon	Mount Lemmon Survey	·	1.1 km	MPC · JPL
821575	2015 HV_{85}	—	April 23, 2015	Haleakala	Pan-STARRS 1	·	1.2 km	MPC · JPL
821576	2015 HG_{91}	—	June 23, 2012	Kitt Peak	Spacewatch	·	510 m	MPC · JPL
821577	2015 HK_{92}	—	August 16, 2012	ESA OGS	ESA OGS	·	510 m	MPC · JPL
821578	2015 HM_{93}	—	April 23, 2015	Haleakala	Pan-STARRS 1	·	500 m	MPC · JPL
821579	2015 HV_{93}	—	April 23, 2015	Haleakala	Pan-STARRS 1	·	600 m	MPC · JPL
821580	2015 HJ_{96}	—	September 26, 2011	Mount Lemmon	Mount Lemmon Survey	·	1.3 km	MPC · JPL
821581	2015 HF_{100}	—	April 2, 2011	Westfield	International Astronomical Search Collaboration	·	980 m	MPC · JPL
821582	2015 HH_{105}	—	April 12, 2015	Haleakala	Pan-STARRS 1	·	540 m	MPC · JPL
821583	2015 HK_{107}	—	March 22, 2015	Haleakala	Pan-STARRS 1	·	2.5 km	MPC · JPL
821584	2015 HO_{107}	—	February 23, 2015	Haleakala	Pan-STARRS 1	·	2.2 km	MPC · JPL
821585	2015 HH_{111}	—	March 25, 2015	Haleakala	Pan-STARRS 1	PHO	590 m	MPC · JPL
821586	2015 HV_{115}	—	April 20, 2015	Haleakala	Pan-STARRS 1	·	1.9 km	MPC · JPL
821587	2015 HD_{117}	—	April 25, 2015	Haleakala	Pan-STARRS 1	H	410 m	MPC · JPL
821588	2015 HZ_{123}	—	April 7, 2005	Mount Lemmon	Mount Lemmon Survey	·	490 m	MPC · JPL
821589	2015 HQ_{125}	—	April 23, 2015	Haleakala	Pan-STARRS 1	·	1.5 km	MPC · JPL
821590	2015 HV_{125}	—	April 23, 2015	Haleakala	Pan-STARRS 1	·	620 m	MPC · JPL
821591	2015 HH_{129}	—	April 23, 2015	Haleakala	Pan-STARRS 1	·	790 m	MPC · JPL
821592	2015 HS_{129}	—	November 17, 2009	Mount Lemmon	Mount Lemmon Survey	·	1.3 km	MPC · JPL
821593	2015 HM_{133}	—	October 26, 2006	Mauna Kea	P. A. Wiegert	·	480 m	MPC · JPL
821594	2015 HH_{135}	—	September 30, 2006	Catalina	CSS	·	600 m	MPC · JPL
821595	2015 HE_{137}	—	April 23, 2015	Haleakala	Pan-STARRS 1	·	530 m	MPC · JPL
821596	2015 HF_{137}	—	April 23, 2015	Haleakala	Pan-STARRS 1	·	1.3 km	MPC · JPL
821597	2015 HP_{140}	—	April 17, 2015	Mount Lemmon	Mount Lemmon Survey	·	680 m	MPC · JPL
821598	2015 HC_{144}	—	April 23, 2015	Haleakala	Pan-STARRS 1	V	500 m	MPC · JPL
821599	2015 HP_{144}	—	April 23, 2015	Haleakala	Pan-STARRS 1	·	1.3 km	MPC · JPL
821600	2015 HR_{145}	—	January 12, 2011	Mount Lemmon	Mount Lemmon Survey	·	510 m	MPC · JPL

== 821601–821700 ==
back to top

Designation			Discovery			Properties		Ref
Permanent	Provisional	Named after	Date	Site	Discoverer(s)	Category	Diam.	Ref
821601	2015 HZ_{146}	—	March 8, 2008	Kitt Peak	Spacewatch	·	600 m	MPC · JPL
821602	2015 HU_{147}	—	November 26, 2013	Haleakala	Pan-STARRS 1	·	1.4 km	MPC · JPL
821603	2015 HB_{149}	—	April 23, 2015	Haleakala	Pan-STARRS 1	·	550 m	MPC · JPL
821604	2015 HR_{152}	—	April 23, 2015	Haleakala	Pan-STARRS 2	NYS	790 m	MPC · JPL
821605	2015 HR_{153}	—	April 23, 2015	Haleakala	Pan-STARRS 1	·	450 m	MPC · JPL
821606	2015 HM_{156}	—	April 24, 2015	Haleakala	Pan-STARRS 1	·	1.3 km	MPC · JPL
821607	2015 HA_{160}	—	April 11, 2015	Mount Lemmon	Mount Lemmon Survey	·	480 m	MPC · JPL
821608	2015 HK_{161}	—	October 29, 2013	Mauna Kea	D. J. Tholen	·	700 m	MPC · JPL
821609	2015 HL_{161}	—	September 22, 2011	Kitt Peak	Spacewatch	·	2.4 km	MPC · JPL
821610	2015 HU_{164}	—	August 25, 2012	Haleakala	Pan-STARRS 1	MAS	630 m	MPC · JPL
821611	2015 HR_{165}	—	September 19, 2006	Kitt Peak	Spacewatch	·	500 m	MPC · JPL
821612	2015 HZ_{168}	—	April 6, 2008	Kitt Peak	Spacewatch	·	640 m	MPC · JPL
821613	2015 HB_{169}	—	March 10, 2005	Mount Lemmon	Mount Lemmon Survey	·	470 m	MPC · JPL
821614	2015 HD_{173}	—	January 26, 2015	Haleakala	Pan-STARRS 1	·	900 m	MPC · JPL
821615	2015 HO_{177}	—	November 9, 2013	Haleakala	Pan-STARRS 1	PHO	740 m	MPC · JPL
821616	2015 HU_{177}	—	March 17, 2015	Haleakala	Pan-STARRS 1	NYS	910 m	MPC · JPL
821617	2015 HK_{178}	—	March 24, 2015	Kitt Peak	Spacewatch	·	530 m	MPC · JPL
821618	2015 HB_{181}	—	April 1, 2015	Haleakala	Pan-STARRS 1	·	560 m	MPC · JPL
821619	2015 HL_{183}	—	June 10, 2007	Kitt Peak	Spacewatch	H	370 m	MPC · JPL
821620	2015 HT_{183}	—	November 10, 2013	Kitt Peak	Spacewatch	H	400 m	MPC · JPL
821621	2015 HB_{184}	—	December 27, 2011	Kitt Peak	Spacewatch	H	350 m	MPC · JPL
821622	2015 HV_{184}	—	April 23, 2015	Kitt Peak	Spacewatch	·	1.5 km	MPC · JPL
821623	2015 HC_{187}	—	March 13, 2008	Mount Lemmon	Mount Lemmon Survey	·	500 m	MPC · JPL
821624	2015 HE_{189}	—	April 18, 2015	Haleakala	Pan-STARRS 1	V	440 m	MPC · JPL
821625	2015 HW_{190}	—	April 23, 2015	Haleakala	Pan-STARRS 1	·	1 km	MPC · JPL
821626	2015 HR_{191}	—	April 23, 2015	Haleakala	Pan-STARRS 1	KON	1.9 km	MPC · JPL
821627	2015 HH_{192}	—	April 2, 2011	Kitt Peak	Spacewatch	·	1.1 km	MPC · JPL
821628	2015 HG_{193}	—	February 25, 2011	Kitt Peak	Spacewatch	·	1.0 km	MPC · JPL
821629	2015 HS_{193}	—	April 25, 2015	Haleakala	Pan-STARRS 1	PHO	730 m	MPC · JPL
821630	2015 HK_{199}	—	April 20, 2015	Kitt Peak	Spacewatch	·	500 m	MPC · JPL
821631	2015 HL_{199}	—	April 23, 2015	Haleakala	Pan-STARRS 1	·	2.6 km	MPC · JPL
821632	2015 HT_{199}	—	April 23, 2015	Haleakala	Pan-STARRS 1	·	590 m	MPC · JPL
821633	2015 HN_{200}	—	April 25, 2015	Haleakala	Pan-STARRS 1	·	510 m	MPC · JPL
821634	2015 HT_{200}	—	April 24, 2015	Kitt Peak	Spacewatch	·	600 m	MPC · JPL
821635	2015 HE_{201}	—	April 19, 2015	Mount Lemmon	Mount Lemmon Survey	·	480 m	MPC · JPL
821636	2015 HN_{202}	—	April 20, 2015	Kitt Peak	Spacewatch	·	1.3 km	MPC · JPL
821637	2015 HP_{202}	—	April 20, 2015	Haleakala	Pan-STARRS 1	·	460 m	MPC · JPL
821638	2015 HU_{202}	—	April 25, 2015	Haleakala	Pan-STARRS 1	·	2.7 km	MPC · JPL
821639	2015 HG_{203}	—	April 25, 2015	Haleakala	Pan-STARRS 1	·	470 m	MPC · JPL
821640	2015 HS_{203}	—	April 19, 2015	Mount Lemmon	Mount Lemmon Survey	·	770 m	MPC · JPL
821641	2015 HZ_{203}	—	April 23, 2015	Haleakala	Pan-STARRS 1	·	680 m	MPC · JPL
821642	2015 HE_{204}	—	August 29, 2009	Kitt Peak	Spacewatch	·	520 m	MPC · JPL
821643	2015 HE_{205}	—	April 16, 2015	Mount Lemmon	Mount Lemmon Survey	·	560 m	MPC · JPL
821644	2015 HA_{206}	—	April 25, 2015	Haleakala	Pan-STARRS 1	·	1.6 km	MPC · JPL
821645	2015 HB_{207}	—	March 28, 2015	Haleakala	Pan-STARRS 1	·	540 m	MPC · JPL
821646	2015 HH_{207}	—	October 17, 2018	Haleakala	Pan-STARRS 2	·	2.7 km	MPC · JPL
821647	2015 HX_{209}	—	April 25, 2015	Haleakala	Pan-STARRS 1	H	290 m	MPC · JPL
821648	2015 HA_{212}	—	April 18, 2015	Haleakala	Pan-STARRS 1	·	1.3 km	MPC · JPL
821649	2015 HQ_{214}	—	June 22, 2012	Kitt Peak	Spacewatch	·	450 m	MPC · JPL
821650	2015 HN_{216}	—	April 25, 2015	Haleakala	Pan-STARRS 1	·	1.4 km	MPC · JPL
821651	2015 HN_{217}	—	April 23, 2015	Haleakala	Pan-STARRS 1	·	780 m	MPC · JPL
821652	2015 HV_{217}	—	April 16, 2015	Mount Lemmon	Mount Lemmon Survey	·	1.7 km	MPC · JPL
821653	2015 HJ_{223}	—	April 25, 2015	Haleakala	Pan-STARRS 1	·	1.1 km	MPC · JPL
821654	2015 HC_{226}	—	April 23, 2015	Haleakala	Pan-STARRS 1	PHO	830 m	MPC · JPL
821655	2015 HL_{228}	—	January 31, 2015	Haleakala	Pan-STARRS 1	·	1.7 km	MPC · JPL
821656	2015 HS_{230}	—	July 22, 2009	Moorook	Falla, N.	·	390 m	MPC · JPL
821657	2015 HX_{231}	—	October 6, 2016	Haleakala	Pan-STARRS 1	V	490 m	MPC · JPL
821658	2015 HV_{233}	—	April 19, 2015	Cerro Tololo	DECam	KOR	910 m	MPC · JPL
821659	2015 HP_{235}	—	July 14, 2016	Haleakala	Pan-STARRS 1	·	1.6 km	MPC · JPL
821660	2015 HW_{235}	—	January 28, 2015	Haleakala	Pan-STARRS 1	·	1.4 km	MPC · JPL
821661	2015 HD_{242}	—	July 21, 2006	Mount Lemmon	Mount Lemmon Survey	·	380 m	MPC · JPL
821662	2015 HY_{257}	—	April 23, 2015	Haleakala	Pan-STARRS 2	·	540 m	MPC · JPL
821663	2015 HV_{305}	—	April 18, 2015	Mount Lemmon	Mount Lemmon Survey	DOR	1.5 km	MPC · JPL
821664	2015 HF_{343}	—	April 23, 2015	Haleakala	Pan-STARRS 1	·	1.1 km	MPC · JPL
821665	2015 HR_{377}	—	April 20, 2015	Haleakala	Pan-STARRS 1	·	1.3 km	MPC · JPL
821666	2015 JO	—	May 7, 2015	Haleakala	Pan-STARRS 1	H	450 m	MPC · JPL
821667	2015 JZ	—	May 11, 2015	Haleakala	Pan-STARRS 1	H	390 m	MPC · JPL
821668	2015 JW_{2}	—	April 23, 2015	Haleakala	Pan-STARRS 2	·	920 m	MPC · JPL
821669	2015 JP_{5}	—	February 9, 2011	Mount Lemmon	Mount Lemmon Survey	·	610 m	MPC · JPL
821670	2015 JE_{6}	—	April 18, 2015	Haleakala	Pan-STARRS 1	·	1.2 km	MPC · JPL
821671	2015 JF_{9}	—	September 7, 2004	Kitt Peak	Spacewatch	·	900 m	MPC · JPL
821672	2015 JN_{11}	—	November 9, 2013	Haleakala	Pan-STARRS 1	H	450 m	MPC · JPL
821673	2015 JU_{11}	—	January 19, 2012	Haleakala	Pan-STARRS 1	H	340 m	MPC · JPL
821674	2015 JV_{11}	—	May 11, 2015	Haleakala	Pan-STARRS 1	H	410 m	MPC · JPL
821675	2015 JA_{15}	—	May 12, 2015	Mount Lemmon	Mount Lemmon Survey	·	740 m	MPC · JPL
821676	2015 JH_{17}	—	May 15, 2015	Haleakala	Pan-STARRS 1	·	1.0 km	MPC · JPL
821677	2015 JA_{19}	—	May 13, 2015	Mount Lemmon	Mount Lemmon Survey	·	450 m	MPC · JPL
821678	2015 JB_{19}	—	May 12, 2015	Mount Lemmon	Mount Lemmon Survey	KON	1.8 km	MPC · JPL
821679	2015 JM_{19}	—	May 14, 2015	Haleakala	Pan-STARRS 1	H	370 m	MPC · JPL
821680	2015 JH_{20}	—	May 14, 2015	Haleakala	Pan-STARRS 1	·	1.2 km	MPC · JPL
821681	2015 JV_{20}	—	May 6, 2015	Haleakala	Pan-STARRS 1	H	270 m	MPC · JPL
821682	2015 JA_{23}	—	May 11, 2015	Mount Lemmon	Mount Lemmon Survey	·	530 m	MPC · JPL
821683	2015 JJ_{23}	—	May 15, 2015	Cerro Paranal	Gaia Ground Based Optical Tracking	·	1.5 km	MPC · JPL
821684	2015 JK_{24}	—	April 26, 2010	Mount Lemmon	Mount Lemmon Survey	H	500 m	MPC · JPL
821685	2015 JP_{24}	—	May 10, 2015	Mount Lemmon	Mount Lemmon Survey	·	950 m	MPC · JPL
821686	2015 JR_{25}	—	March 30, 2015	Haleakala	Pan-STARRS 1	H	320 m	MPC · JPL
821687	2015 JS_{25}	—	May 12, 2015	Cerro Paranal	Gaia Ground Based Optical Tracking	·	1.3 km	MPC · JPL
821688	2015 KT_{1}	—	April 24, 2015	Haleakala	Pan-STARRS 1	·	1.7 km	MPC · JPL
821689	2015 KE_{3}	—	February 11, 2008	Mount Lemmon	Mount Lemmon Survey	·	590 m	MPC · JPL
821690	2015 KR_{4}	—	April 18, 2015	Mount Lemmon	Mount Lemmon Survey	EUN	1.0 km	MPC · JPL
821691	2015 KF_{5}	—	September 17, 2012	Kitt Peak	Spacewatch	EUN	1.2 km	MPC · JPL
821692	2015 KO_{7}	—	March 28, 2015	Haleakala	Pan-STARRS 1	·	870 m	MPC · JPL
821693	2015 KL_{8}	—	April 1, 2011	Kitt Peak	Spacewatch	NYS	1.0 km	MPC · JPL
821694	2015 KO_{9}	—	April 23, 2015	Haleakala	Pan-STARRS 1	·	670 m	MPC · JPL
821695	2015 KP_{9}	—	April 23, 2015	Haleakala	Pan-STARRS 1	·	2.1 km	MPC · JPL
821696	2015 KF_{12}	—	May 18, 2015	Haleakala	Pan-STARRS 1	·	960 m	MPC · JPL
821697	2015 KY_{18}	—	May 19, 2015	Mount Lemmon	Mount Lemmon Survey	H	300 m	MPC · JPL
821698	2015 KY_{21}	—	April 13, 2015	Haleakala	Pan-STARRS 1	LIX	2.6 km	MPC · JPL
821699	2015 KG_{23}	—	August 28, 2005	Kitt Peak	Spacewatch	·	840 m	MPC · JPL
821700	2015 KG_{24}	—	October 16, 2001	Kitt Peak	Spacewatch	MAS	580 m	MPC · JPL

== 821701–821800 ==
back to top

Designation			Discovery			Properties		Ref
Permanent	Provisional	Named after	Date	Site	Discoverer(s)	Category	Diam.	Ref
821701	2015 KU_{24}	—	May 18, 2015	Haleakala	Pan-STARRS 1	EOS	1.3 km	MPC · JPL
821702	2015 KW_{26}	—	March 17, 2015	Kitt Peak	Spacewatch	·	1.0 km	MPC · JPL
821703	2015 KA_{30}	—	May 13, 2015	Mount Lemmon	Mount Lemmon Survey	·	490 m	MPC · JPL
821704	2015 KN_{30}	—	December 14, 2010	Mount Lemmon	Mount Lemmon Survey	·	500 m	MPC · JPL
821705	2015 KZ_{32}	—	May 19, 2015	Haleakala	Pan-STARRS 1	(5)	940 m	MPC · JPL
821706	2015 KD_{40}	—	May 20, 2015	Haleakala	Pan-STARRS 1	·	1.3 km	MPC · JPL
821707	2015 KV_{40}	—	February 25, 2011	Mount Lemmon	Mount Lemmon Survey	·	650 m	MPC · JPL
821708	2015 KA_{42}	—	May 20, 2015	Haleakala	Pan-STARRS 1	MAR	880 m	MPC · JPL
821709	2015 KC_{42}	—	May 10, 2004	Kitt Peak	Spacewatch	NYS	680 m	MPC · JPL
821710	2015 KO_{44}	—	May 20, 2015	Haleakala	Pan-STARRS 1	·	480 m	MPC · JPL
821711	2015 KK_{45}	—	June 17, 2010	Mount Lemmon	Mount Lemmon Survey	·	1.6 km	MPC · JPL
821712	2015 KT_{45}	—	October 17, 2012	Haleakala	Pan-STARRS 1	MAS	530 m	MPC · JPL
821713	2015 KS_{47}	—	May 20, 2015	Haleakala	Pan-STARRS 1	·	370 m	MPC · JPL
821714	2015 KF_{48}	—	July 5, 2005	Mount Lemmon	Mount Lemmon Survey	·	420 m	MPC · JPL
821715	2015 KF_{55}	—	May 20, 2015	Haleakala	Pan-STARRS 1	·	530 m	MPC · JPL
821716	2015 KG_{56}	—	May 20, 2015	Haleakala	Pan-STARRS 1	·	460 m	MPC · JPL
821717	2015 KH_{57}	—	April 25, 2015	Haleakala	Pan-STARRS 1	·	600 m	MPC · JPL
821718	2015 KM_{60}	—	March 17, 2015	Haleakala	Pan-STARRS 1	·	770 m	MPC · JPL
821719	2015 KK_{73}	—	May 21, 2015	Haleakala	Pan-STARRS 1	·	2.0 km	MPC · JPL
821720	2015 KT_{73}	—	October 1, 2005	Mount Lemmon	Mount Lemmon Survey	·	700 m	MPC · JPL
821721	2015 KU_{77}	—	April 23, 2015	Haleakala	Pan-STARRS 1	·	930 m	MPC · JPL
821722	2015 KV_{86}	—	February 8, 2011	Mount Lemmon	Mount Lemmon Survey	·	540 m	MPC · JPL
821723	2015 KW_{86}	—	April 20, 2015	Kitt Peak	Spacewatch	PHO	670 m	MPC · JPL
821724	2015 KO_{87}	—	May 21, 2015	Haleakala	Pan-STARRS 1	·	1.5 km	MPC · JPL
821725	2015 KR_{89}	—	March 30, 2015	Haleakala	Pan-STARRS 1	·	470 m	MPC · JPL
821726	2015 KC_{90}	—	January 14, 2011	Kitt Peak	Spacewatch	·	480 m	MPC · JPL
821727	2015 KO_{90}	—	August 15, 2002	Kitt Peak	Spacewatch	·	500 m	MPC · JPL
821728	2015 KU_{94}	—	March 30, 2015	Haleakala	Pan-STARRS 1	·	2.2 km	MPC · JPL
821729	2015 KT_{97}	—	November 7, 2012	Mount Lemmon	Mount Lemmon Survey	·	1.3 km	MPC · JPL
821730	2015 KX_{98}	—	September 24, 2012	Mount Lemmon	Mount Lemmon Survey	·	720 m	MPC · JPL
821731	2015 KD_{101}	—	April 29, 2008	Kitt Peak	Spacewatch	PHO	780 m	MPC · JPL
821732	2015 KF_{101}	—	May 5, 2008	Mount Lemmon	Mount Lemmon Survey	·	620 m	MPC · JPL
821733	2015 KO_{101}	—	May 21, 2015	Haleakala	Pan-STARRS 1	·	1.7 km	MPC · JPL
821734	2015 KE_{102}	—	May 21, 2015	Haleakala	Pan-STARRS 1	V	460 m	MPC · JPL
821735	2015 KN_{108}	—	May 21, 2015	Haleakala	Pan-STARRS 1	·	1.4 km	MPC · JPL
821736	2015 KR_{109}	—	May 21, 2015	Haleakala	Pan-STARRS 1	·	1.3 km	MPC · JPL
821737	2015 KE_{112}	—	May 14, 2015	Haleakala	Pan-STARRS 1	·	1.1 km	MPC · JPL
821738	2015 KB_{114}	—	May 21, 2015	Haleakala	Pan-STARRS 1	·	1.9 km	MPC · JPL
821739	2015 KW_{114}	—	May 13, 2015	Mount Lemmon	Mount Lemmon Survey	·	1.0 km	MPC · JPL
821740	2015 KX_{115}	—	October 1, 2003	Kitt Peak	Spacewatch	EUN	900 m	MPC · JPL
821741	2015 KH_{120}	—	May 19, 2004	Kitt Peak	Spacewatch	PHO	770 m	MPC · JPL
821742	2015 KO_{121}	—	July 16, 2012	Siding Spring	SSS	·	620 m	MPC · JPL
821743	2015 KV_{122}	—	May 21, 2015	Haleakala	Pan-STARRS 1	·	530 m	MPC · JPL
821744	2015 KK_{126}	—	September 24, 2012	Mount Lemmon	Mount Lemmon Survey	·	780 m	MPC · JPL
821745	2015 KW_{126}	—	April 30, 2015	Cerro Paranal	Gaia Ground Based Optical Tracking	·	700 m	MPC · JPL
821746	2015 KP_{129}	—	August 26, 2012	Haleakala	Pan-STARRS 1	·	420 m	MPC · JPL
821747	2015 KC_{130}	—	May 13, 2005	Kitt Peak	Spacewatch	·	430 m	MPC · JPL
821748	2015 KV_{130}	—	March 30, 2015	Haleakala	Pan-STARRS 1	·	620 m	MPC · JPL
821749	2015 KA_{134}	—	May 23, 2015	Mount Lemmon	Mount Lemmon Survey	(895)	2.7 km	MPC · JPL
821750	2015 KV_{134}	—	February 24, 2015	Haleakala	Pan-STARRS 1	·	930 m	MPC · JPL
821751	2015 KY_{139}	—	March 31, 2015	Haleakala	Pan-STARRS 1	·	560 m	MPC · JPL
821752	2015 KQ_{140}	—	January 23, 2011	Mount Lemmon	Mount Lemmon Survey	·	480 m	MPC · JPL
821753	2015 KR_{142}	—	February 27, 2015	Haleakala	Pan-STARRS 1	EUN	870 m	MPC · JPL
821754	2015 KN_{143}	—	May 13, 2015	Mount Lemmon	Mount Lemmon Survey	·	980 m	MPC · JPL
821755	2015 KR_{143}	—	May 24, 2015	Haleakala	Pan-STARRS 1	·	1.1 km	MPC · JPL
821756	2015 KK_{145}	—	January 15, 2007	Mauna Kea	P. A. Wiegert	·	520 m	MPC · JPL
821757	2015 KN_{145}	—	October 26, 2005	Kitt Peak	Spacewatch	V	520 m	MPC · JPL
821758	2015 KK_{146}	—	April 25, 2015	Haleakala	Pan-STARRS 1	·	1.4 km	MPC · JPL
821759	2015 KT_{150}	—	February 10, 2011	Mount Lemmon	Mount Lemmon Survey	·	800 m	MPC · JPL
821760	2015 KR_{163}	—	May 19, 2015	Mount Lemmon	Mount Lemmon Survey	H	340 m	MPC · JPL
821761	2015 KT_{163}	—	May 24, 2015	Haleakala	Pan-STARRS 1	H	420 m	MPC · JPL
821762	2015 KC_{165}	—	September 13, 2004	Kitt Peak	Spacewatch	·	2.4 km	MPC · JPL
821763	2015 KU_{168}	—	May 18, 2015	Haleakala	Pan-STARRS 1	·	870 m	MPC · JPL
821764	2015 KG_{169}	—	May 19, 2015	Haleakala	Pan-STARRS 1	·	2.7 km	MPC · JPL
821765	2015 KR_{170}	—	May 21, 2015	Haleakala	Pan-STARRS 2	·	1.1 km	MPC · JPL
821766	2015 KW_{170}	—	May 22, 2015	Haleakala	Pan-STARRS 1	·	2.5 km	MPC · JPL
821767	2015 KT_{171}	—	May 25, 2015	Haleakala	Pan-STARRS 1	·	1.5 km	MPC · JPL
821768	2015 KG_{178}	—	May 20, 2015	Cerro Tololo-DECam	DECam	plutino	160 km	MPC · JPL
821769	2015 KH_{179}	—	May 20, 2015	Mount Lemmon	Mount Lemmon Survey	·	1.0 km	MPC · JPL
821770	2015 KM_{179}	—	May 25, 2015	Haleakala	Pan-STARRS 1	·	1.8 km	MPC · JPL
821771	2015 KO_{179}	—	May 21, 2015	Haleakala	Pan-STARRS 1	PHO	610 m	MPC · JPL
821772	2015 KO_{181}	—	May 22, 2015	Haleakala	Pan-STARRS 1	·	620 m	MPC · JPL
821773	2015 KP_{181}	—	May 25, 2015	Mount Lemmon	Mount Lemmon Survey	·	1.0 km	MPC · JPL
821774	2015 KQ_{181}	—	May 21, 2015	Haleakala	Pan-STARRS 1	(5)	750 m	MPC · JPL
821775	2015 KK_{182}	—	May 22, 2015	Haleakala	Pan-STARRS 1	·	470 m	MPC · JPL
821776	2015 KL_{184}	—	May 22, 2015	Haleakala	Pan-STARRS 1	·	1.0 km	MPC · JPL
821777	2015 KC_{186}	—	May 26, 2015	Haleakala	Pan-STARRS 1	·	1.1 km	MPC · JPL
821778	2015 KD_{186}	—	May 19, 2015	Haleakala	Pan-STARRS 1	·	1.1 km	MPC · JPL
821779	2015 KO_{186}	—	May 18, 2015	Haleakala	Pan-STARRS 1	·	540 m	MPC · JPL
821780	2015 KE_{187}	—	May 21, 2015	Haleakala	Pan-STARRS 1	·	1.3 km	MPC · JPL
821781	2015 KC_{188}	—	May 24, 2015	Cerro Paranal	Gaia Ground Based Optical Tracking	·	530 m	MPC · JPL
821782	2015 KJ_{188}	—	May 24, 2015	Haleakala	Pan-STARRS 1	·	460 m	MPC · JPL
821783	2015 KK_{188}	—	May 19, 2015	Haleakala	Pan-STARRS 1	H	350 m	MPC · JPL
821784	2015 KZ_{188}	—	May 25, 2015	Mount Lemmon	Mount Lemmon Survey	H	290 m	MPC · JPL
821785	2015 KX_{189}	—	February 10, 2011	Mount Lemmon	Mount Lemmon Survey	·	570 m	MPC · JPL
821786	2015 KK_{191}	—	May 25, 2015	Haleakala	Pan-STARRS 1	BAR	1.0 km	MPC · JPL
821787	2015 KV_{193}	—	May 21, 2015	Haleakala	Pan-STARRS 1	·	1.4 km	MPC · JPL
821788	2015 KD_{194}	—	May 25, 2015	Haleakala	Pan-STARRS 1	H	400 m	MPC · JPL
821789	2015 KE_{196}	—	May 19, 2015	Haleakala	Pan-STARRS 1	RAF	610 m	MPC · JPL
821790	2015 KZ_{196}	—	May 26, 2015	Haleakala	Pan-STARRS 1	·	950 m	MPC · JPL
821791	2015 KH_{200}	—	May 21, 2015	Haleakala	Pan-STARRS 1	TRE	1.8 km	MPC · JPL
821792	2015 KJ_{203}	—	May 21, 2015	Haleakala	Pan-STARRS 1	·	440 m	MPC · JPL
821793	2015 KV_{203}	—	May 24, 2015	Haleakala	Pan-STARRS 1	·	1.9 km	MPC · JPL
821794	2015 KE_{204}	—	May 20, 2015	Mount Lemmon	Mount Lemmon Survey	V	560 m	MPC · JPL
821795	2015 KH_{204}	—	May 21, 2015	Haleakala	Pan-STARRS 1	·	1.6 km	MPC · JPL
821796	2015 KJ_{204}	—	May 22, 2015	Mount Lemmon	Mount Lemmon Survey	·	2.2 km	MPC · JPL
821797	2015 KA_{208}	—	May 30, 2015	Haleakala	Pan-STARRS 1	·	810 m	MPC · JPL
821798	2015 KZ_{214}	—	May 21, 2015	Haleakala	Pan-STARRS 1	·	780 m	MPC · JPL
821799	2015 KB_{234}	—	May 26, 2015	Haleakala	Pan-STARRS 1	·	1.0 km	MPC · JPL
821800	2015 KE_{240}	—	May 25, 2015	Mount Lemmon	Mount Lemmon Survey	V	370 m	MPC · JPL

== 821801–821900 ==
back to top

Designation			Discovery			Properties		Ref
Permanent	Provisional	Named after	Date	Site	Discoverer(s)	Category	Diam.	Ref
821801	2015 KD_{241}	—	May 18, 2015	Haleakala	Pan-STARRS 2	·	500 m	MPC · JPL
821802	2015 KV_{241}	—	May 18, 2015	Haleakala	Pan-STARRS 2	·	410 m	MPC · JPL
821803	2015 KA_{325}	—	May 26, 2015	Haleakala	Pan-STARRS 1	·	550 m	MPC · JPL
821804	2015 KL_{334}	—	May 20, 2015	Cerro Tololo	DECam	NYS	850 m	MPC · JPL
821805	2015 KC_{364}	—	May 21, 2015	Cerro Tololo	DECam	·	600 m	MPC · JPL
821806	2015 KB_{370}	—	May 29, 2015	Haleakala	Pan-STARRS 1	·	2.8 km	MPC · JPL
821807	2015 KL_{374}	—	May 19, 2015	Cerro Tololo	DECam	L4	5.6 km	MPC · JPL
821808	2015 KM_{389}	—	May 20, 2015	Cerro Tololo	DECam	L4	5.8 km	MPC · JPL
821809	2015 KJ_{459}	—	May 22, 2015	Haleakala	Pan-STARRS 1	·	1.2 km	MPC · JPL
821810	2015 LG_{1}	—	February 17, 2015	Haleakala	Pan-STARRS 1	TIR	2.4 km	MPC · JPL
821811	2015 LD_{2}	—	October 25, 2005	Catalina	CSS	·	640 m	MPC · JPL
821812	2015 LB_{5}	—	June 7, 2015	Haleakala	Pan-STARRS 1	·	650 m	MPC · JPL
821813	2015 LC_{5}	—	March 8, 2008	Mount Lemmon	Mount Lemmon Survey	·	490 m	MPC · JPL
821814	2015 LW_{5}	—	January 15, 2007	Mauna Kea	P. A. Wiegert	H	310 m	MPC · JPL
821815	2015 LZ_{5}	—	March 22, 2015	Haleakala	Pan-STARRS 1	·	1.3 km	MPC · JPL
821816	2015 LJ_{6}	—	December 21, 2008	Kitt Peak	Spacewatch	H	420 m	MPC · JPL
821817	2015 LD_{8}	—	April 9, 2010	Mount Lemmon	Mount Lemmon Survey	·	1.5 km	MPC · JPL
821818	2015 LL_{8}	—	June 7, 2015	Haleakala	Pan-STARRS 1	·	1.6 km	MPC · JPL
821819	2015 LY_{8}	—	May 12, 2015	Mount Lemmon	Mount Lemmon Survey	·	670 m	MPC · JPL
821820	2015 LS_{9}	—	May 24, 2011	Haleakala	Pan-STARRS 1	·	820 m	MPC · JPL
821821	2015 LZ_{9}	—	May 15, 2015	Haleakala	Pan-STARRS 1	·	1.6 km	MPC · JPL
821822	2015 LE_{10}	—	August 5, 2005	Palomar	NEAT	·	560 m	MPC · JPL
821823	2015 LU_{16}	—	June 11, 2015	Haleakala	Pan-STARRS 1	·	560 m	MPC · JPL
821824	2015 LR_{17}	—	June 11, 2015	Haleakala	Pan-STARRS 1	·	880 m	MPC · JPL
821825	2015 LP_{19}	—	September 14, 2012	Kitt Peak	Spacewatch	·	530 m	MPC · JPL
821826	2015 LZ_{20}	—	June 18, 2010	Mount Lemmon	Mount Lemmon Survey	H	460 m	MPC · JPL
821827	2015 LW_{23}	—	June 12, 2015	Mount Lemmon	Mount Lemmon Survey	·	630 m	MPC · JPL
821828	2015 LJ_{25}	—	June 18, 2005	Mount Lemmon	Mount Lemmon Survey	V	470 m	MPC · JPL
821829	2015 LX_{25}	—	June 13, 2015	Haleakala	Pan-STARRS 1	V	450 m	MPC · JPL
821830	2015 LO_{27}	—	May 25, 2015	Haleakala	Pan-STARRS 1	·	690 m	MPC · JPL
821831	2015 LB_{28}	—	August 26, 2012	Haleakala	Pan-STARRS 1	·	430 m	MPC · JPL
821832	2015 LY_{33}	—	June 13, 2015	Haleakala	Pan-STARRS 1	·	780 m	MPC · JPL
821833	2015 LE_{34}	—	May 19, 2015	Haleakala	Pan-STARRS 1	(1547)	1.1 km	MPC · JPL
821834	2015 LA_{35}	—	June 13, 2015	Haleakala	Pan-STARRS 1	·	1.6 km	MPC · JPL
821835	2015 LQ_{37}	—	April 8, 2008	Kitt Peak	Spacewatch	·	710 m	MPC · JPL
821836	2015 LQ_{38}	—	June 15, 2015	Haleakala	Pan-STARRS 1	·	1.5 km	MPC · JPL
821837	2015 LQ_{40}	—	March 30, 2015	Haleakala	Pan-STARRS 1	·	550 m	MPC · JPL
821838	2015 LV_{40}	—	April 24, 2012	Haleakala	Pan-STARRS 1	H	410 m	MPC · JPL
821839	2015 LX_{40}	—	November 11, 2013	Mount Lemmon	Mount Lemmon Survey	H	360 m	MPC · JPL
821840	2015 LB_{41}	—	June 18, 2012	Mount Lemmon	Mount Lemmon Survey	H	420 m	MPC · JPL
821841	2015 LM_{41}	—	February 1, 2009	Kitt Peak	Spacewatch	·	1.5 km	MPC · JPL
821842	2015 LR_{41}	—	June 15, 2015	Haleakala	Pan-STARRS 1	·	1.6 km	MPC · JPL
821843	2015 LN_{43}	—	August 10, 2011	Haleakala	Pan-STARRS 1	·	700 m	MPC · JPL
821844	2015 LW_{46}	—	June 15, 2015	Haleakala	Pan-STARRS 1	ADE	1.7 km	MPC · JPL
821845	2015 LG_{47}	—	June 15, 2015	Mount Lemmon	Mount Lemmon Survey	H	340 m	MPC · JPL
821846	2015 LD_{52}	—	June 12, 2015	Mount Lemmon	Mount Lemmon Survey	·	1.4 km	MPC · JPL
821847	2015 LA_{53}	—	June 12, 2015	Mount Lemmon	Mount Lemmon Survey	·	650 m	MPC · JPL
821848	2015 LZ_{54}	—	June 12, 2015	Haleakala	Pan-STARRS 1	EUN	840 m	MPC · JPL
821849	2015 LH_{55}	—	June 15, 2015	Haleakala	Pan-STARRS 1	MAR	800 m	MPC · JPL
821850	2015 LC_{56}	—	June 15, 2015	Haleakala	Pan-STARRS 1	·	1.5 km	MPC · JPL
821851	2015 LE_{57}	—	June 14, 2015	Mount Lemmon	Mount Lemmon Survey	·	2.1 km	MPC · JPL
821852	2015 LK_{57}	—	June 13, 2015	Haleakala	Pan-STARRS 1	·	2.0 km	MPC · JPL
821853	2015 LV_{57}	—	June 13, 2015	Haleakala	Pan-STARRS 1	·	1.1 km	MPC · JPL
821854	2015 LY_{62}	—	June 12, 2015	Haleakala	Pan-STARRS 1	·	440 m	MPC · JPL
821855	2015 MP	—	September 26, 2013	Mount Lemmon	Mount Lemmon Survey	H	330 m	MPC · JPL
821856	2015 MX_{2}	—	October 18, 2007	Mount Lemmon	Mount Lemmon Survey	·	1.2 km	MPC · JPL
821857	2015 MV_{4}	—	November 12, 2005	Kitt Peak	Spacewatch	·	2.3 km	MPC · JPL
821858	2015 MO_{5}	—	June 16, 2015	Haleakala	Pan-STARRS 1	·	570 m	MPC · JPL
821859	2015 MC_{10}	—	December 8, 2005	Kitt Peak	Spacewatch	H	450 m	MPC · JPL
821860	2015 MY_{11}	—	June 10, 2015	Haleakala	Pan-STARRS 1	·	1.3 km	MPC · JPL
821861	2015 MA_{12}	—	May 24, 2015	Haleakala	Pan-STARRS 1	·	700 m	MPC · JPL
821862	2015 MG_{12}	—	November 7, 2012	Haleakala	Pan-STARRS 1	·	620 m	MPC · JPL
821863	2015 MT_{13}	—	September 9, 2008	Mount Lemmon	Mount Lemmon Survey	V	560 m	MPC · JPL
821864	2015 ML_{14}	—	May 21, 2015	Haleakala	Pan-STARRS 1	·	1.0 km	MPC · JPL
821865	2015 MJ_{15}	—	June 17, 2015	Haleakala	Pan-STARRS 1	·	570 m	MPC · JPL
821866	2015 MB_{17}	—	April 24, 2015	Haleakala	Pan-STARRS 1	HNS	1.1 km	MPC · JPL
821867	2015 MU_{36}	—	June 18, 2015	Haleakala	Pan-STARRS 1	·	1.6 km	MPC · JPL
821868	2015 MW_{41}	—	March 30, 2015	Haleakala	Pan-STARRS 1	·	1.5 km	MPC · JPL
821869	2015 ML_{42}	—	June 18, 2015	Haleakala	Pan-STARRS 1	·	1.8 km	MPC · JPL
821870	2015 MN_{46}	—	February 12, 2011	Mount Lemmon	Mount Lemmon Survey	·	590 m	MPC · JPL
821871	2015 MJ_{47}	—	October 19, 2012	Haleakala	Pan-STARRS 1	·	510 m	MPC · JPL
821872	2015 MF_{51}	—	June 17, 2015	Haleakala	Pan-STARRS 1	·	980 m	MPC · JPL
821873	2015 MS_{52}	—	May 22, 2015	Haleakala	Pan-STARRS 1	·	520 m	MPC · JPL
821874	2015 MK_{53}	—	June 19, 2015	Haleakala	Pan-STARRS 1	·	490 m	MPC · JPL
821875	2015 MH_{54}	—	January 26, 2014	Haleakala	Pan-STARRS 1	·	2.9 km	MPC · JPL
821876	2015 MM_{56}	—	June 20, 2015	Haleakala	Pan-STARRS 1	·	2.0 km	MPC · JPL
821877	2015 MV_{57}	—	March 6, 2014	Mount Lemmon	Mount Lemmon Survey	·	1.4 km	MPC · JPL
821878	2015 MM_{58}	—	June 20, 2015	Haleakala	Pan-STARRS 1	PHO	900 m	MPC · JPL
821879	2015 MO_{58}	—	June 20, 2015	Haleakala	Pan-STARRS 1	PHO	900 m	MPC · JPL
821880	2015 MQ_{58}	—	June 13, 2015	Haleakala	Pan-STARRS 1	·	580 m	MPC · JPL
821881	2015 MH_{61}	—	June 20, 2015	Haleakala	Pan-STARRS 1	·	550 m	MPC · JPL
821882	2015 MY_{63}	—	February 2, 2014	Mount Lemmon	Mount Lemmon Survey	·	720 m	MPC · JPL
821883	2015 MQ_{66}	—	April 20, 2007	Kitt Peak	Spacewatch	H	310 m	MPC · JPL
821884	2015 ML_{69}	—	June 22, 2015	Haleakala	Pan-STARRS 1	·	350 m	MPC · JPL
821885	2015 MS_{70}	—	June 18, 2015	Haleakala	Pan-STARRS 1	·	1.4 km	MPC · JPL
821886	2015 MX_{70}	—	February 26, 2014	Haleakala	Pan-STARRS 1	EUN	920 m	MPC · JPL
821887	2015 MT_{71}	—	June 12, 2015	Mount Lemmon	Mount Lemmon Survey	·	530 m	MPC · JPL
821888	2015 MJ_{75}	—	June 13, 2015	Haleakala	Pan-STARRS 1	BRA	1.2 km	MPC · JPL
821889	2015 MN_{75}	—	June 18, 2015	Haleakala	Pan-STARRS 1	·	930 m	MPC · JPL
821890	2015 ME_{80}	—	March 27, 2011	Mount Lemmon	Mount Lemmon Survey	·	490 m	MPC · JPL
821891	2015 MJ_{80}	—	September 3, 2010	Mount Lemmon	Mount Lemmon Survey	EOS	1.3 km	MPC · JPL
821892	2015 ML_{83}	—	June 16, 2015	Haleakala	Pan-STARRS 1	PHO	660 m	MPC · JPL
821893	2015 MQ_{84}	—	June 18, 2015	Haleakala	Pan-STARRS 1	·	2.1 km	MPC · JPL
821894	2015 MG_{85}	—	June 22, 2015	Haleakala	Pan-STARRS 1	EOS	1.5 km	MPC · JPL
821895	2015 MF_{86}	—	June 22, 2015	Haleakala	Pan-STARRS 1	·	490 m	MPC · JPL
821896	2015 ML_{91}	—	June 21, 2015	Haleakala	Pan-STARRS 1	·	2.0 km	MPC · JPL
821897	2015 MA_{92}	—	December 25, 2013	Mount Lemmon	Mount Lemmon Survey	H	450 m	MPC · JPL
821898	2015 MO_{96}	—	June 24, 2015	Haleakala	Pan-STARRS 1	H	430 m	MPC · JPL
821899	2015 ML_{99}	—	April 20, 2009	Mount Lemmon	Mount Lemmon Survey	·	1.3 km	MPC · JPL
821900	2015 MJ_{101}	—	March 30, 2011	Mount Lemmon	Mount Lemmon Survey	·	550 m	MPC · JPL

== 821901–822000 ==
back to top

Designation			Discovery			Properties		Ref
Permanent	Provisional	Named after	Date	Site	Discoverer(s)	Category	Diam.	Ref
821901	2015 MP_{103}	—	October 23, 2008	Kitt Peak	Spacewatch	NYS	980 m	MPC · JPL
821902	2015 MC_{104}	—	August 29, 2005	Kitt Peak	Spacewatch	·	440 m	MPC · JPL
821903	2015 MY_{104}	—	June 13, 2015	Haleakala	Pan-STARRS 1	·	880 m	MPC · JPL
821904	2015 MT_{106}	—	June 26, 2015	Haleakala	Pan-STARRS 1	·	520 m	MPC · JPL
821905	2015 MR_{107}	—	January 28, 2011	Mount Lemmon	Mount Lemmon Survey	·	540 m	MPC · JPL
821906	2015 ME_{108}	—	August 20, 2008	Kitt Peak	Spacewatch	·	700 m	MPC · JPL
821907	2015 MW_{111}	—	March 29, 2011	Catalina	CSS	·	800 m	MPC · JPL
821908	2015 MZ_{111}	—	June 13, 2015	Haleakala	Pan-STARRS 1	·	1.6 km	MPC · JPL
821909	2015 ML_{112}	—	June 26, 2015	Haleakala	Pan-STARRS 1	·	1.4 km	MPC · JPL
821910	2015 MM_{112}	—	June 26, 2015	Haleakala	Pan-STARRS 1	·	520 m	MPC · JPL
821911	2015 MF_{113}	—	June 15, 2015	Haleakala	Pan-STARRS 1	·	1.7 km	MPC · JPL
821912	2015 MH_{114}	—	November 22, 2011	Mount Lemmon	Mount Lemmon Survey	·	2.0 km	MPC · JPL
821913	2015 MK_{116}	—	September 27, 2006	Mount Lemmon	Mount Lemmon Survey	·	620 m	MPC · JPL
821914	2015 MY_{116}	—	March 5, 2002	Sacramento Peak	SDSS	·	990 m	MPC · JPL
821915	2015 MJ_{118}	—	June 27, 2015	Haleakala	Pan-STARRS 2	·	780 m	MPC · JPL
821916	2015 MU_{119}	—	July 12, 2005	Kitt Peak	Spacewatch	·	580 m	MPC · JPL
821917	2015 MU_{120}	—	June 27, 2015	Haleakala	Pan-STARRS 1	·	1.4 km	MPC · JPL
821918	2015 MW_{120}	—	November 24, 2012	Kitt Peak	Spacewatch	·	1.0 km	MPC · JPL
821919	2015 MC_{123}	—	October 24, 2011	Kitt Peak	Spacewatch	·	1.7 km	MPC · JPL
821920	2015 ME_{123}	—	June 28, 2015	Haleakala	Pan-STARRS 1	PHO	630 m	MPC · JPL
821921	2015 MV_{124}	—	September 4, 2008	Kitt Peak	Spacewatch	·	940 m	MPC · JPL
821922	2015 ML_{127}	—	August 5, 2008	Siding Spring	SSS	·	760 m	MPC · JPL
821923	2015 MM_{127}	—	December 11, 2013	Mount Lemmon	Mount Lemmon Survey	H	470 m	MPC · JPL
821924	2015 MT_{127}	—	April 2, 2011	Mount Lemmon	Mount Lemmon Survey	·	520 m	MPC · JPL
821925	2015 MZ_{127}	—	June 27, 2015	Haleakala	Pan-STARRS 2	·	2.4 km	MPC · JPL
821926	2015 ME_{128}	—	June 21, 2015	Mount Lemmon	Mount Lemmon Survey	PHO	830 m	MPC · JPL
821927	2015 MS_{129}	—	June 29, 2015	Haleakala	Pan-STARRS 1	·	1.8 km	MPC · JPL
821928	2015 MS_{131}	—	March 29, 2009	Mount Lemmon	Mount Lemmon Survey	H	390 m	MPC · JPL
821929	2015 MY_{131}	—	June 22, 2015	Haleakala	Pan-STARRS 2	H	490 m	MPC · JPL
821930	2015 MC_{132}	—	June 27, 2015	Haleakala	Pan-STARRS 1	H	320 m	MPC · JPL
821931	2015 MW_{132}	—	June 20, 2015	Haleakala	Pan-STARRS 1	·	940 m	MPC · JPL
821932	2015 MC_{133}	—	June 21, 2015	Mount Lemmon	Mount Lemmon Survey	DOR	1.8 km	MPC · JPL
821933	2015 MO_{133}	—	June 27, 2015	Haleakala	Pan-STARRS 2	·	1.9 km	MPC · JPL
821934	2015 MZ_{137}	—	January 22, 2013	Mount Lemmon	Mount Lemmon Survey	EOS	1.3 km	MPC · JPL
821935	2015 MF_{138}	—	January 25, 2014	Haleakala	Pan-STARRS 1	·	760 m	MPC · JPL
821936	2015 ME_{139}	—	April 5, 2003	Kitt Peak	Spacewatch	MAS	540 m	MPC · JPL
821937	2015 MT_{139}	—	June 17, 2015	Haleakala	Pan-STARRS 1	EOS	1.2 km	MPC · JPL
821938	2015 MW_{142}	—	June 20, 2015	Haleakala	Pan-STARRS 1	·	2.1 km	MPC · JPL
821939	2015 MS_{144}	—	May 6, 2014	Haleakala	Pan-STARRS 1	·	2.9 km	MPC · JPL
821940	2015 MU_{144}	—	June 25, 2015	Haleakala	Pan-STARRS 2	·	1.9 km	MPC · JPL
821941	2015 MN_{145}	—	September 26, 2011	Haleakala	Pan-STARRS 1	·	1.4 km	MPC · JPL
821942	2015 MH_{146}	—	February 10, 2014	Haleakala	Pan-STARRS 1	·	750 m	MPC · JPL
821943	2015 MM_{146}	—	May 26, 2011	Kitt Peak	Spacewatch	·	720 m	MPC · JPL
821944	2015 MQ_{147}	—	June 27, 2015	Haleakala	Pan-STARRS 1	·	2.1 km	MPC · JPL
821945	2015 MR_{147}	—	June 27, 2015	Haleakala	Pan-STARRS 1	·	2.0 km	MPC · JPL
821946	2015 MS_{148}	—	July 28, 2011	Haleakala	Pan-STARRS 1	·	980 m	MPC · JPL
821947	2015 ME_{151}	—	June 16, 2015	Mount Lemmon	Mount Lemmon Survey	·	2.9 km	MPC · JPL
821948	2015 MF_{151}	—	June 20, 2015	Haleakala	Pan-STARRS 2	·	690 m	MPC · JPL
821949	2015 MH_{151}	—	June 18, 2015	Haleakala	Pan-STARRS 1	·	570 m	MPC · JPL
821950	2015 MC_{152}	—	June 30, 2015	Haleakala	Pan-STARRS 1	·	2.4 km	MPC · JPL
821951	2015 MH_{152}	—	June 17, 2015	Mount Lemmon	Mount Lemmon Survey	H	340 m	MPC · JPL
821952	2015 MO_{152}	—	June 30, 2015	Haleakala	Pan-STARRS 1	H	410 m	MPC · JPL
821953	2015 MR_{154}	—	June 18, 2015	Haleakala	Pan-STARRS 1	·	1.4 km	MPC · JPL
821954	2015 MG_{156}	—	December 1, 2016	Mount Lemmon	Mount Lemmon Survey	·	720 m	MPC · JPL
821955	2015 MV_{156}	—	June 23, 2015	Haleakala	Pan-STARRS 1	·	2.5 km	MPC · JPL
821956	2015 ME_{159}	—	June 18, 2015	Haleakala	Pan-STARRS 1	·	740 m	MPC · JPL
821957	2015 MG_{160}	—	January 14, 2018	Mount Lemmon	Mount Lemmon Survey	V	500 m	MPC · JPL
821958	2015 MZ_{162}	—	June 18, 2015	Haleakala	Pan-STARRS 1	·	550 m	MPC · JPL
821959	2015 MC_{164}	—	June 20, 2015	Haleakala	Pan-STARRS 1	·	850 m	MPC · JPL
821960	2015 MD_{165}	—	June 29, 2015	Haleakala	Pan-STARRS 1	·	1.5 km	MPC · JPL
821961	2015 MH_{166}	—	June 22, 2015	Haleakala	Pan-STARRS 1	·	1.8 km	MPC · JPL
821962	2015 MN_{167}	—	June 29, 2015	Haleakala	Pan-STARRS 1	·	1.5 km	MPC · JPL
821963	2015 ML_{168}	—	June 23, 2015	Haleakala	Pan-STARRS 1	·	1.8 km	MPC · JPL
821964	2015 MZ_{168}	—	June 19, 2015	Haleakala	Pan-STARRS 1	·	1.4 km	MPC · JPL
821965	2015 MB_{169}	—	June 26, 2015	Haleakala	Pan-STARRS 1	·	2.0 km	MPC · JPL
821966	2015 MJ_{170}	—	June 18, 2015	Haleakala	Pan-STARRS 1	HNS	910 m	MPC · JPL
821967	2015 MC_{171}	—	June 17, 2015	Haleakala	Pan-STARRS 1	·	710 m	MPC · JPL
821968	2015 MT_{172}	—	June 27, 2015	Haleakala	Pan-STARRS 1	·	860 m	MPC · JPL
821969	2015 MD_{174}	—	June 25, 2015	Haleakala	Pan-STARRS 1	·	1.8 km	MPC · JPL
821970	2015 ME_{176}	—	June 23, 2015	Haleakala	Pan-STARRS 1	·	870 m	MPC · JPL
821971	2015 MR_{177}	—	June 26, 2015	Haleakala	Pan-STARRS 1	·	470 m	MPC · JPL
821972	2015 MT_{177}	—	June 26, 2015	Haleakala	Pan-STARRS 1	·	790 m	MPC · JPL
821973	2015 MA_{178}	—	June 25, 2015	Haleakala	Pan-STARRS 1	·	530 m	MPC · JPL
821974	2015 MZ_{178}	—	June 26, 2015	Haleakala	Pan-STARRS 1	·	1.4 km	MPC · JPL
821975	2015 MG_{180}	—	June 22, 2015	Haleakala	Pan-STARRS 1	·	550 m	MPC · JPL
821976	2015 MH_{186}	—	June 26, 2015	Haleakala	Pan-STARRS 1	·	1.8 km	MPC · JPL
821977	2015 MY_{186}	—	June 20, 2015	Haleakala	Pan-STARRS 1	·	1.6 km	MPC · JPL
821978	2015 MG_{188}	—	June 20, 2015	Haleakala	Pan-STARRS 1	·	1.7 km	MPC · JPL
821979	2015 MU_{190}	—	June 25, 2015	Haleakala	Pan-STARRS 1	·	1.2 km	MPC · JPL
821980	2015 MD_{191}	—	October 31, 2005	Kitt Peak	Spacewatch	·	1.6 km	MPC · JPL
821981	2015 MJ_{194}	—	June 25, 2015	Haleakala	Pan-STARRS 1	H	470 m	MPC · JPL
821982	2015 MD_{195}	—	June 17, 2015	Haleakala	Pan-STARRS 1	·	2.5 km	MPC · JPL
821983	2015 MG_{195}	—	June 22, 2015	Haleakala	Pan-STARRS 1	EOS	1.1 km	MPC · JPL
821984	2015 MR_{195}	—	June 26, 2015	Haleakala	Pan-STARRS 1	EOS	1.2 km	MPC · JPL
821985	2015 MW_{195}	—	June 27, 2015	Haleakala	Pan-STARRS 1	·	1.6 km	MPC · JPL
821986	2015 MK_{196}	—	June 18, 2015	Haleakala	Pan-STARRS 1	·	420 m	MPC · JPL
821987	2015 ML_{197}	—	June 27, 2015	Haleakala	Pan-STARRS 1	MAR	660 m	MPC · JPL
821988	2015 MP_{201}	—	June 26, 2015	Haleakala	Pan-STARRS 1	VER	2.0 km	MPC · JPL
821989	2015 MJ_{202}	—	June 24, 2015	Haleakala	Pan-STARRS 1	PHO	740 m	MPC · JPL
821990	2015 MS_{202}	—	June 22, 2015	Haleakala	Pan-STARRS 1	·	2.2 km	MPC · JPL
821991	2015 MZ_{202}	—	June 26, 2015	Haleakala	Pan-STARRS 1	·	870 m	MPC · JPL
821992	2015 NG_{2}	—	July 6, 2015	Haleakala	Pan-STARRS 1	·	1.3 km	MPC · JPL
821993	2015 NV_{4}	—	June 18, 2015	Haleakala	Pan-STARRS 1	·	770 m	MPC · JPL
821994	2015 NU_{6}	—	August 28, 2006	Kitt Peak	Spacewatch	AGN	850 m	MPC · JPL
821995	2015 ND_{8}	—	June 26, 2015	Haleakala	Pan-STARRS 1	·	820 m	MPC · JPL
821996	2015 NT_{9}	—	June 28, 2005	Kitt Peak	Spacewatch	·	520 m	MPC · JPL
821997	2015 NB_{10}	—	July 8, 2015	Cerro Paranal	Gaia Ground Based Optical Tracking	·	550 m	MPC · JPL
821998	2015 NL_{13}	—	July 12, 2015	Haleakala	Pan-STARRS 1	H	390 m	MPC · JPL
821999	2015 NP_{16}	—	June 25, 2015	Haleakala	Pan-STARRS 1	·	590 m	MPC · JPL
822000	2015 NF_{17}	—	July 12, 2015	Haleakala	Pan-STARRS 1	·	1.7 km	MPC · JPL

back to top
