= List of minor planets: 849001–850000 =

The following is a partial list of minor planets, running from minor-planet number 849001 through 850000, inclusive. The primary data for this and other partial lists is based on JPL's "Small-Body Orbital Elements" and data available from the Minor Planet Center. Critical list information is also provided by the MPC, unless otherwise specified from Lowell Observatory. A detailed description of the table's columns and additional sources are given on the main page including a complete list of every page in this series, and a statistical break-up on the dynamical classification of minor planets.

Also see the summary list of all named bodies in numerical and alphabetical order, and the corresponding naming citations for the number range of this particular list. New namings may only be added to this list after official publication, as the preannouncement of names is condemned by the Working Group for Small Bodies Nomenclature of the International Astronomical Union.

Near-Earth obj.	MBA (inner)	MBA (outer)	Centaur
Mars-crosser	MBA (middle)	Jupiter trojan	Trans-Neptunian obj.
Unclassified

== 849001–849100 ==
Designation			Discovery			Properties		Ref
Permanent	Provisional	Named after	Date	Site	Discoverer(s)	Category	Diam.	Ref
849001	2005 ND_{114}	—	July 7, 2005	Mauna Kea	Veillet, C.	KOR	730 m	MPC · JPL
849002	2005 NW_{115}	—	July 7, 2005	Mauna Kea	Veillet, C.	·	440 m	MPC · JPL
849003	2005 NV_{116}	—	July 15, 2005	Mount Lemmon	Mount Lemmon Survey	·	390 m	MPC · JPL
849004	2005 NE_{119}	—	July 7, 2005	Mauna Kea	Veillet, C.	·	410 m	MPC · JPL
849005	2005 NT_{126}	—	July 4, 2005	Mount Lemmon	Mount Lemmon Survey	·	510 m	MPC · JPL
849006	2005 NE_{127}	—	July 12, 2015	Haleakala	Pan-STARRS 1	·	1.6 km	MPC · JPL
849007	2005 NF_{129}	—	January 3, 2014	Mount Lemmon	Mount Lemmon Survey	MAS	470 m	MPC · JPL
849008	2005 NL_{130}	—	August 28, 2016	Mount Lemmon	Mount Lemmon Survey	·	690 m	MPC · JPL
849009	2005 NP_{130}	—	December 3, 2014	Haleakala	Pan-STARRS 1	·	900 m	MPC · JPL
849010	2005 NT_{130}	—	March 18, 2009	Kitt Peak	Spacewatch	·	1.4 km	MPC · JPL
849011	2005 NT_{131}	—	July 3, 2005	Mount Lemmon	Mount Lemmon Survey	·	490 m	MPC · JPL
849012	2005 NW_{135}	—	July 4, 2005	Palomar	NEAT	·	440 m	MPC · JPL
849013	2005 ON_{4}	—	July 27, 2005	Palomar	NEAT	·	540 m	MPC · JPL
849014	2005 OR_{13}	—	July 29, 2005	Palomar	NEAT	·	980 m	MPC · JPL
849015	2005 OH_{33}	—	July 18, 2005	Palomar	NEAT	·	510 m	MPC · JPL
849016	2005 OO_{34}	—	September 26, 2016	Haleakala	Pan-STARRS 1	MAS	540 m	MPC · JPL
849017	2005 OP_{34}	—	August 8, 2016	Haleakala	Pan-STARRS 1	·	720 m	MPC · JPL
849018	2005 OR_{34}	—	July 30, 2005	Palomar	NEAT	·	490 m	MPC · JPL
849019	2005 PE	—	August 2, 2005	Campo Imperatore	CINEOS	·	940 m	MPC · JPL
849020	2005 PS_{6}	—	August 4, 2005	Palomar	NEAT	·	1.7 km	MPC · JPL
849021	2005 PO_{9}	—	August 4, 2005	Palomar	NEAT	·	550 m	MPC · JPL
849022	2005 PS_{23}	—	August 4, 2005	Palomar	NEAT	·	570 m	MPC · JPL
849023	2005 PC_{30}	—	August 6, 2005	Palomar	NEAT	·	670 m	MPC · JPL
849024	2005 PF_{30}	—	February 10, 2011	Mount Lemmon	Mount Lemmon Survey	·	530 m	MPC · JPL
849025	2005 PY_{32}	—	August 6, 2005	Palomar	NEAT	NYS	670 m	MPC · JPL
849026	2005 QW_{5}	—	August 24, 2005	Palomar	NEAT	·	620 m	MPC · JPL
849027	2005 QN_{6}	—	August 24, 2005	Palomar	NEAT	·	700 m	MPC · JPL
849028	2005 QG_{26}	—	August 27, 2005	Kitt Peak	Spacewatch	·	490 m	MPC · JPL
849029	2005 QT_{27}	—	August 27, 2005	Kitt Peak	Spacewatch	·	870 m	MPC · JPL
849030	2005 QX_{38}	—	August 25, 2005	Campo Imperatore	CINEOS	·	490 m	MPC · JPL
849031	2005 QY_{40}	—	August 27, 2005	Anderson Mesa	LONEOS	·	480 m	MPC · JPL
849032	2005 QE_{76}	—	August 5, 2005	Palomar	NEAT	·	1.5 km	MPC · JPL
849033	2005 QY_{89}	—	August 24, 2005	Palomar	NEAT	·	920 m	MPC · JPL
849034	2005 QV_{92}	—	August 26, 2005	Palomar	NEAT	(1547)	1.1 km	MPC · JPL
849035	2005 QC_{96}	—	July 28, 2005	Palomar	NEAT	·	850 m	MPC · JPL
849036	2005 QU_{117}	—	August 28, 2005	Kitt Peak	Spacewatch	·	1.3 km	MPC · JPL
849037	2005 QS_{120}	—	August 28, 2005	Kitt Peak	Spacewatch	·	500 m	MPC · JPL
849038	2005 QQ_{124}	—	August 28, 2005	Kitt Peak	Spacewatch	·	450 m	MPC · JPL
849039	2005 QH_{126}	—	August 28, 2005	Kitt Peak	Spacewatch	MAS	560 m	MPC · JPL
849040	2005 QZ_{134}	—	August 28, 2005	Kitt Peak	Spacewatch	·	810 m	MPC · JPL
849041	2005 QG_{139}	—	August 28, 2005	Kitt Peak	Spacewatch	·	500 m	MPC · JPL
849042	2005 QD_{163}	—	August 30, 2005	Anderson Mesa	LONEOS	·	600 m	MPC · JPL
849043	2005 QF_{172}	—	September 1, 2005	Kitt Peak	Spacewatch	·	1.6 km	MPC · JPL
849044	2005 QL_{177}	—	September 17, 1995	Kitt Peak	Spacewatch	·	400 m	MPC · JPL
849045	2005 QH_{186}	—	September 2, 2005	Mauna Kea	P. A. Wiegert	KOR	1.2 km	MPC · JPL
849046	2005 QN_{186}	—	September 2, 2005	Mauna Kea	P. A. Wiegert	·	1.7 km	MPC · JPL
849047	2005 QN_{189}	—	August 30, 2005	Kitt Peak	Spacewatch	·	1.4 km	MPC · JPL
849048	2005 QB_{191}	—	August 29, 2005	Kitt Peak	Spacewatch	·	2.6 km	MPC · JPL
849049	2005 QH_{195}	—	March 1, 2011	Mount Lemmon	Mount Lemmon Survey	·	700 m	MPC · JPL
849050	2005 QJ_{195}	—	August 28, 2005	Kitt Peak	Spacewatch	·	480 m	MPC · JPL
849051	2005 QG_{196}	—	August 28, 2005	Kitt Peak	Spacewatch	·	550 m	MPC · JPL
849052	2005 QJ_{197}	—	August 29, 2005	Kitt Peak	Spacewatch	·	1.4 km	MPC · JPL
849053	2005 QL_{198}	—	August 26, 2005	Palomar	NEAT	·	520 m	MPC · JPL
849054	2005 QO_{200}	—	October 2, 2014	Haleakala	Pan-STARRS 1	(1547)	1.2 km	MPC · JPL
849055	2005 QR_{201}	—	October 4, 2014	Mount Lemmon	Mount Lemmon Survey	·	1.2 km	MPC · JPL
849056	2005 QV_{203}	—	August 28, 2005	Kitt Peak	Spacewatch	·	580 m	MPC · JPL
849057	2005 QS_{204}	—	August 31, 2005	Kitt Peak	Spacewatch	MAS	560 m	MPC · JPL
849058	2005 QE_{205}	—	August 31, 2005	Kitt Peak	Spacewatch	·	690 m	MPC · JPL
849059	2005 QK_{205}	—	August 30, 2005	Kitt Peak	Spacewatch	·	1.1 km	MPC · JPL
849060	2005 QD_{207}	—	August 29, 2005	Kitt Peak	Spacewatch	·	910 m	MPC · JPL
849061	2005 QF_{207}	—	August 30, 2005	Kitt Peak	Spacewatch	·	790 m	MPC · JPL
849062	2005 QT_{207}	—	August 28, 2005	Kitt Peak	Spacewatch	(5)	830 m	MPC · JPL
849063	2005 QV_{208}	—	August 31, 2005	Kitt Peak	Spacewatch	·	1.8 km	MPC · JPL
849064	2005 QH_{209}	—	August 27, 2005	Palomar	NEAT	·	440 m	MPC · JPL
849065	2005 QH_{212}	—	August 29, 2005	Kitt Peak	Spacewatch	·	650 m	MPC · JPL
849066	2005 RD_{1}	—	September 1, 2005	Palomar	NEAT	AMO	750 m	MPC · JPL
849067	2005 RN_{36}	—	February 3, 2017	Haleakala	Pan-STARRS 1	·	520 m	MPC · JPL
849068	2005 RX_{40}	—	August 29, 2005	Kitt Peak	Spacewatch	·	750 m	MPC · JPL
849069	2005 RV_{53}	—	September 3, 2005	Palomar	NEAT	·	820 m	MPC · JPL
849070	2005 RV_{54}	—	August 2, 2016	Haleakala	Pan-STARRS 1	·	1.8 km	MPC · JPL
849071	2005 RF_{55}	—	August 6, 2012	Haleakala	Pan-STARRS 1	·	1.1 km	MPC · JPL
849072	2005 RU_{55}	—	November 17, 2009	Mount Lemmon	Mount Lemmon Survey	·	600 m	MPC · JPL
849073	2005 RV_{55}	—	September 1, 2005	Kitt Peak	Spacewatch	·	680 m	MPC · JPL
849074	2005 RY_{55}	—	August 30, 2011	Haleakala	Pan-STARRS 1	·	2.3 km	MPC · JPL
849075	2005 RT_{57}	—	July 29, 2014	Haleakala	Pan-STARRS 1	·	1.5 km	MPC · JPL
849076	2005 RR_{59}	—	July 23, 2015	Haleakala	Pan-STARRS 1	·	390 m	MPC · JPL
849077	2005 RP_{60}	—	September 10, 2005	Pla D'Arguines	R. Ferrando, Ferrando, M.	EUN	710 m	MPC · JPL
849078	2005 RA_{64}	—	September 13, 2005	Kitt Peak	Spacewatch	·	710 m	MPC · JPL
849079	2005 SQ_{8}	—	September 25, 2005	Kitt Peak	Spacewatch	MAS	560 m	MPC · JPL
849080	2005 ST_{10}	—	September 23, 2005	Kitt Peak	Spacewatch	·	2.1 km	MPC · JPL
849081	2005 SV_{27}	—	September 23, 2005	Kitt Peak	Spacewatch	EUN	790 m	MPC · JPL
849082	2005 SC_{28}	—	September 23, 2005	Kitt Peak	Spacewatch	·	780 m	MPC · JPL
849083	2005 SL_{54}	—	September 25, 2005	Kitt Peak	Spacewatch	MAS	590 m	MPC · JPL
849084	2005 SR_{58}	—	September 26, 2005	Kitt Peak	Spacewatch	·	690 m	MPC · JPL
849085	2005 SE_{67}	—	September 27, 2005	Kitt Peak	Spacewatch	·	1.5 km	MPC · JPL
849086	2005 SN_{68}	—	September 27, 2005	Kitt Peak	Spacewatch	·	810 m	MPC · JPL
849087	2005 SG_{69}	—	September 27, 2005	Kitt Peak	Spacewatch	·	470 m	MPC · JPL
849088	2005 SX_{71}	—	August 31, 2005	Kitt Peak	Spacewatch	·	740 m	MPC · JPL
849089	2005 SR_{74}	—	September 24, 2005	Kitt Peak	Spacewatch	MAS	490 m	MPC · JPL
849090	2005 SD_{76}	—	August 31, 2005	Kitt Peak	Spacewatch	NYS	560 m	MPC · JPL
849091	2005 SV_{87}	—	September 15, 2005	Catalina	CSS	·	1.2 km	MPC · JPL
849092	2005 SS_{88}	—	August 30, 2005	Palomar	NEAT	·	550 m	MPC · JPL
849093	2005 SN_{90}	—	September 24, 2005	Kitt Peak	Spacewatch	NYS	720 m	MPC · JPL
849094	2005 SU_{90}	—	September 24, 2005	Kitt Peak	Spacewatch	·	510 m	MPC · JPL
849095	2005 SF_{102}	—	September 25, 2005	Kitt Peak	Spacewatch	·	990 m	MPC · JPL
849096	2005 SK_{102}	—	September 25, 2005	Kitt Peak	Spacewatch	·	950 m	MPC · JPL
849097	2005 SO_{109}	—	September 26, 2005	Kitt Peak	Spacewatch	PHO	890 m	MPC · JPL
849098	2005 SV_{109}	—	September 26, 2005	Kitt Peak	Spacewatch	·	590 m	MPC · JPL
849099	2005 SX_{115}	—	September 27, 2005	Kitt Peak	Spacewatch	MAS	470 m	MPC · JPL
849100	2005 SB_{116}	—	September 27, 2005	Kitt Peak	Spacewatch	·	1.3 km	MPC · JPL

== 849101–849200 ==
back to top

Designation			Discovery			Properties		Ref
Permanent	Provisional	Named after	Date	Site	Discoverer(s)	Category	Diam.	Ref
849101	2005 SG_{117}	—	September 13, 2005	Catalina	CSS	·	1.6 km	MPC · JPL
849102	2005 SR_{132}	—	September 29, 2005	Kitt Peak	Spacewatch	MAS	550 m	MPC · JPL
849103	2005 SX_{132}	—	September 29, 2005	Kitt Peak	Spacewatch	·	510 m	MPC · JPL
849104	2005 SR_{135}	—	September 24, 2005	Kitt Peak	Spacewatch	MAS · critical	460 m	MPC · JPL
849105	2005 SJ_{137}	—	September 24, 2005	Kitt Peak	Spacewatch	NYS	900 m	MPC · JPL
849106	2005 SB_{139}	—	September 25, 2005	Kitt Peak	Spacewatch	·	420 m	MPC · JPL
849107	2005 SN_{154}	—	September 1, 2005	Kitt Peak	Spacewatch	·	1.2 km	MPC · JPL
849108	2005 SY_{160}	—	September 27, 2005	Kitt Peak	Spacewatch	·	1.3 km	MPC · JPL
849109	2005 SF_{168}	—	September 29, 2005	Kitt Peak	Spacewatch	PHO	580 m	MPC · JPL
849110	2005 SE_{180}	—	August 28, 2005	Kitt Peak	Spacewatch	·	620 m	MPC · JPL
849111	2005 SG_{192}	—	September 29, 2005	Mount Lemmon	Mount Lemmon Survey	·	1.1 km	MPC · JPL
849112	2005 SK_{192}	—	September 29, 2005	Mount Lemmon	Mount Lemmon Survey	·	1.1 km	MPC · JPL
849113	2005 SS_{196}	—	September 29, 2005	Côtes de Meuse	M. Dawson, M. Kaschinski	·	1.4 km	MPC · JPL
849114	2005 SZ_{196}	—	October 19, 1995	Kitt Peak	Spacewatch	·	440 m	MPC · JPL
849115	2005 ST_{199}	—	August 25, 2005	Palomar	NEAT	·	1.1 km	MPC · JPL
849116	2005 SQ_{201}	—	September 30, 2005	Kitt Peak	Spacewatch	·	660 m	MPC · JPL
849117	2005 SE_{204}	—	September 30, 2005	Mount Lemmon	Mount Lemmon Survey	·	1.3 km	MPC · JPL
849118	2005 SL_{205}	—	September 12, 2005	Socorro	LINEAR	·	720 m	MPC · JPL
849119	2005 SE_{212}	—	September 30, 2005	Mount Lemmon	Mount Lemmon Survey	·	800 m	MPC · JPL
849120	2005 SQ_{224}	—	September 29, 2005	Mount Lemmon	Mount Lemmon Survey	·	930 m	MPC · JPL
849121	2005 SM_{225}	—	September 29, 2005	Mount Lemmon	Mount Lemmon Survey	·	1.3 km	MPC · JPL
849122	2005 SP_{233}	—	September 30, 2005	Mount Lemmon	Mount Lemmon Survey	·	510 m	MPC · JPL
849123	2005 SP_{235}	—	September 29, 2005	Kitt Peak	Spacewatch	·	890 m	MPC · JPL
849124	2005 SP_{236}	—	September 29, 2005	Kitt Peak	Spacewatch	NYS	910 m	MPC · JPL
849125	2005 SY_{236}	—	September 29, 2005	Kitt Peak	Spacewatch	·	1.6 km	MPC · JPL
849126	2005 SX_{248}	—	September 30, 2005	Mount Lemmon	Mount Lemmon Survey	·	1.3 km	MPC · JPL
849127	2005 SY_{248}	—	September 30, 2005	Mount Lemmon	Mount Lemmon Survey	·	410 m	MPC · JPL
849128	2005 SO_{259}	—	July 29, 2005	Palomar	NEAT	·	1.0 km	MPC · JPL
849129	2005 SV_{260}	—	September 24, 2005	Kitt Peak	Spacewatch	·	1.4 km	MPC · JPL
849130	2005 SR_{273}	—	September 27, 2005	Kitt Peak	Spacewatch	3:2 · SHU	4.0 km	MPC · JPL
849131	2005 SU_{280}	—	September 29, 2005	Catalina	CSS	·	1.2 km	MPC · JPL
849132	2005 SK_{281}	—	September 30, 2005	Mount Lemmon	Mount Lemmon Survey	·	790 m	MPC · JPL
849133	2005 SH_{282}	—	October 30, 2005	Apache Point	SDSS Collaboration	·	1.4 km	MPC · JPL
849134	2005 SF_{284}	—	October 3, 2005	Apache Point	SDSS Collaboration	·	470 m	MPC · JPL
849135	2005 SO_{284}	—	February 22, 2007	Kitt Peak	Spacewatch	·	1.7 km	MPC · JPL
849136	2005 SF_{287}	—	October 1, 2005	Apache Point	SDSS Collaboration	·	1.4 km	MPC · JPL
849137	2005 SM_{288}	—	September 27, 2005	Apache Point	SDSS Collaboration	V	420 m	MPC · JPL
849138	2005 SS_{290}	—	September 23, 2005	Kitt Peak	Spacewatch	·	780 m	MPC · JPL
849139	2005 SE_{296}	—	September 25, 2005	Kitt Peak	Spacewatch	·	510 m	MPC · JPL
849140	2005 SZ_{296}	—	September 26, 2005	Kitt Peak	Spacewatch	·	460 m	MPC · JPL
849141	2005 ST_{298}	—	September 29, 2005	Mount Lemmon	Mount Lemmon Survey	·	930 m	MPC · JPL
849142	2005 SM_{301}	—	September 30, 2005	Mount Lemmon	Mount Lemmon Survey	·	1.1 km	MPC · JPL
849143	2005 SZ_{301}	—	September 26, 2005	Kitt Peak	Spacewatch	·	720 m	MPC · JPL
849144	2005 SC_{302}	—	September 30, 2005	Mount Lemmon	Mount Lemmon Survey	·	510 m	MPC · JPL
849145	2005 SN_{302}	—	September 27, 2005	Kitt Peak	Spacewatch	·	720 m	MPC · JPL
849146	2005 SW_{302}	—	September 29, 2005	Mount Lemmon	Mount Lemmon Survey	·	1.3 km	MPC · JPL
849147	2005 SQ_{303}	—	September 30, 2005	Kitt Peak	Spacewatch	·	470 m	MPC · JPL
849148	2005 SG_{304}	—	September 29, 2005	Mount Lemmon	Mount Lemmon Survey	·	1.1 km	MPC · JPL
849149	2005 SM_{304}	—	September 30, 2005	Mount Lemmon	Mount Lemmon Survey	·	690 m	MPC · JPL
849150	2005 SX_{304}	—	September 26, 2005	Kitt Peak	Spacewatch	·	490 m	MPC · JPL
849151	2005 SO_{305}	—	September 29, 2005	Kitt Peak	Spacewatch	·	440 m	MPC · JPL
849152	2005 TF_{8}	—	October 1, 2005	Kitt Peak	Spacewatch	MAS	570 m	MPC · JPL
849153	2005 TN_{8}	—	September 23, 2005	Kitt Peak	Spacewatch	·	1.7 km	MPC · JPL
849154	2005 TH_{9}	—	October 1, 2005	Kitt Peak	Spacewatch	V	420 m	MPC · JPL
849155	2005 TH_{13}	—	October 2, 2005	Mount Lemmon	Mount Lemmon Survey	·	1.1 km	MPC · JPL
849156	2005 TF_{14}	—	October 1, 2005	Catalina	CSS	JUN	630 m	MPC · JPL
849157	2005 TR_{22}	—	October 1, 2005	Mount Lemmon	Mount Lemmon Survey	V	370 m	MPC · JPL
849158	2005 TB_{27}	—	October 1, 2005	Mount Lemmon	Mount Lemmon Survey	·	2.0 km	MPC · JPL
849159	2005 TE_{34}	—	October 1, 2005	Kitt Peak	Spacewatch	·	1.4 km	MPC · JPL
849160	2005 TV_{34}	—	October 1, 2005	Kitt Peak	Spacewatch	·	630 m	MPC · JPL
849161	2005 TG_{43}	—	October 5, 2005	Kitt Peak	Spacewatch	·	700 m	MPC · JPL
849162	2005 TW_{45}	—	August 30, 2005	Palomar	NEAT	·	520 m	MPC · JPL
849163	2005 TD_{46}	—	July 28, 2005	Palomar	NEAT	·	1.3 km	MPC · JPL
849164	2005 TY_{47}	—	October 6, 2005	Bergisch Gladbach	W. Bickel	·	800 m	MPC · JPL
849165	2005 TJ_{63}	—	October 2, 2005	Mount Lemmon	Mount Lemmon Survey	·	470 m	MPC · JPL
849166	2005 TA_{68}	—	October 1, 2005	Kitt Peak	Spacewatch	·	390 m	MPC · JPL
849167	2005 TL_{68}	—	September 11, 2005	Kitt Peak	Spacewatch	·	1.1 km	MPC · JPL
849168	2005 TD_{71}	—	September 29, 2005	Mount Lemmon	Mount Lemmon Survey	NYS	560 m	MPC · JPL
849169	2005 TH_{78}	—	September 3, 2005	Palomar	NEAT	·	1.3 km	MPC · JPL
849170	2005 TS_{84}	—	September 24, 2005	Kitt Peak	Spacewatch	·	510 m	MPC · JPL
849171	2005 TR_{86}	—	October 5, 2005	Kitt Peak	Spacewatch	NYS	710 m	MPC · JPL
849172	2005 TS_{87}	—	October 5, 2005	Kitt Peak	Spacewatch	·	1.4 km	MPC · JPL
849173	2005 TG_{93}	—	October 6, 2005	Kitt Peak	Spacewatch	·	500 m	MPC · JPL
849174	2005 TW_{107}	—	September 29, 2005	Mount Lemmon	Mount Lemmon Survey	·	650 m	MPC · JPL
849175	2005 TH_{108}	—	October 1, 2005	Catalina	CSS	·	450 m	MPC · JPL
849176	2005 TL_{111}	—	October 7, 2005	Catalina	CSS	·	800 m	MPC · JPL
849177	2005 TV_{111}	—	October 7, 2005	Kitt Peak	Spacewatch	·	940 m	MPC · JPL
849178	2005 TG_{113}	—	September 27, 2005	Kitt Peak	Spacewatch	·	1.1 km	MPC · JPL
849179	2005 TJ_{114}	—	September 27, 2005	Kitt Peak	Spacewatch	·	1.9 km	MPC · JPL
849180	2005 TZ_{120}	—	September 29, 2005	Mount Lemmon	Mount Lemmon Survey	LIX	2.3 km	MPC · JPL
849181	2005 TE_{122}	—	October 7, 2005	Kitt Peak	Spacewatch	·	1.9 km	MPC · JPL
849182	2005 TV_{125}	—	September 29, 2005	Mount Lemmon	Mount Lemmon Survey	MIS	1.8 km	MPC · JPL
849183	2005 TD_{129}	—	October 7, 2005	Kitt Peak	Spacewatch	MAS	520 m	MPC · JPL
849184	2005 TT_{130}	—	October 7, 2005	Kitt Peak	Spacewatch	·	930 m	MPC · JPL
849185	2005 TD_{131}	—	October 7, 2005	Kitt Peak	Spacewatch	·	1.3 km	MPC · JPL
849186	2005 TZ_{137}	—	October 7, 2005	Mount Lemmon	Mount Lemmon Survey	·	1.3 km	MPC · JPL
849187	2005 TQ_{147}	—	September 29, 2005	Kitt Peak	Spacewatch	·	480 m	MPC · JPL
849188	2005 TH_{149}	—	September 29, 2005	Kitt Peak	Spacewatch	·	2.3 km	MPC · JPL
849189	2005 TA_{151}	—	October 8, 2005	Kitt Peak	Spacewatch	·	470 m	MPC · JPL
849190	2005 TQ_{157}	—	October 9, 2005	Kitt Peak	Spacewatch	NYS	650 m	MPC · JPL
849191	2005 TC_{159}	—	October 9, 2005	Kitt Peak	Spacewatch	·	650 m	MPC · JPL
849192	2005 TG_{162}	—	October 9, 2005	Kitt Peak	Spacewatch	·	1.5 km	MPC · JPL
849193	2005 TD_{169}	—	September 30, 2005	Mount Lemmon	Mount Lemmon Survey	·	850 m	MPC · JPL
849194	2005 TE_{177}	—	September 24, 2005	Kitt Peak	Spacewatch	MAS	470 m	MPC · JPL
849195	2005 TS_{187}	—	October 8, 2005	Kitt Peak	Spacewatch	·	480 m	MPC · JPL
849196	2005 TF_{189}	—	October 13, 2005	Kitt Peak	Spacewatch	·	1.7 km	MPC · JPL
849197	2005 TV_{194}	—	October 12, 2005	Kitt Peak	Spacewatch	·	2.5 km	MPC · JPL
849198	2005 TN_{195}	—	October 1, 2005	Kitt Peak	Spacewatch	·	1.6 km	MPC · JPL
849199	2005 TU_{198}	—	October 1, 2005	Catalina	CSS	·	850 m	MPC · JPL
849200	2005 TG_{203}	—	October 1, 2005	Kitt Peak	Spacewatch	·	510 m	MPC · JPL

== 849201–849300 ==
back to top

Designation			Discovery			Properties		Ref
Permanent	Provisional	Named after	Date	Site	Discoverer(s)	Category	Diam.	Ref
849201	2005 TH_{204}	—	October 1, 2005	Kitt Peak	Spacewatch	·	390 m	MPC · JPL
849202	2005 TM_{204}	—	October 12, 2005	Kitt Peak	Spacewatch	·	710 m	MPC · JPL
849203	2005 TO_{204}	—	October 11, 2005	Kitt Peak	Spacewatch	·	1.9 km	MPC · JPL
849204	2005 TE_{207}	—	October 1, 2005	Kitt Peak	Spacewatch	·	520 m	MPC · JPL
849205	2005 TL_{210}	—	October 1, 2005	Kitt Peak	Spacewatch	·	640 m	MPC · JPL
849206	2005 TB_{212}	—	September 21, 2012	Kitt Peak	Spacewatch	·	410 m	MPC · JPL
849207	2005 TG_{212}	—	October 12, 2005	Kitt Peak	Spacewatch	·	1.2 km	MPC · JPL
849208	2005 TM_{213}	—	October 1, 2005	Mount Lemmon	Mount Lemmon Survey	MAS	460 m	MPC · JPL
849209	2005 TY_{213}	—	October 13, 2005	Kitt Peak	Spacewatch	·	360 m	MPC · JPL
849210	2005 TD_{214}	—	October 13, 2005	Kitt Peak	Spacewatch	·	520 m	MPC · JPL
849211	2005 TR_{215}	—	October 1, 2005	Mount Lemmon	Mount Lemmon Survey	EUN	860 m	MPC · JPL
849212	2005 TD_{216}	—	October 1, 2005	Kitt Peak	Spacewatch	·	820 m	MPC · JPL
849213	2005 TP_{216}	—	October 6, 2005	Kitt Peak	Spacewatch	·	1.7 km	MPC · JPL
849214	2005 TY_{216}	—	October 4, 2005	Mount Lemmon	Mount Lemmon Survey	PHO	600 m	MPC · JPL
849215	2005 TO_{217}	—	October 1, 2005	Mount Lemmon	Mount Lemmon Survey	·	950 m	MPC · JPL
849216	2005 TU_{218}	—	October 5, 2005	Mount Lemmon	Mount Lemmon Survey	·	480 m	MPC · JPL
849217	2005 TW_{218}	—	October 4, 2005	Mount Lemmon	Mount Lemmon Survey	·	1.2 km	MPC · JPL
849218	2005 TC_{219}	—	October 11, 2005	Kitt Peak	Spacewatch	·	1.0 km	MPC · JPL
849219	2005 TU_{219}	—	October 12, 2005	Kitt Peak	Spacewatch	·	810 m	MPC · JPL
849220	2005 TQ_{222}	—	October 10, 2005	Catalina	CSS	·	1.2 km	MPC · JPL
849221	2005 TH_{224}	—	October 13, 2005	Kitt Peak	Spacewatch	·	460 m	MPC · JPL
849222	2005 TV_{224}	—	October 7, 2005	Mauna Kea	A. Boattini	JUN	700 m	MPC · JPL
849223	2005 TR_{225}	—	October 1, 2005	Mount Lemmon	Mount Lemmon Survey	NEM	1.4 km	MPC · JPL
849224 Motoyama	2005 TQ_{226}	Motoyama	December 23, 2016	Mauna Kea	COIAS	·	1.6 km	MPC · JPL
849225	2005 UT_{6}	—	October 29, 2005	Kitt Peak	Spacewatch	·	490 m	MPC · JPL
849226	2005 UA_{14}	—	October 8, 2005	Kitt Peak	Spacewatch	·	730 m	MPC · JPL
849227	2005 UL_{15}	—	September 7, 2000	Kitt Peak	Spacewatch	·	1.3 km	MPC · JPL
849228	2005 US_{23}	—	October 5, 2005	Kitt Peak	Spacewatch	·	920 m	MPC · JPL
849229	2005 UM_{24}	—	September 30, 2005	Mount Lemmon	Mount Lemmon Survey	·	510 m	MPC · JPL
849230	2005 US_{30}	—	October 1, 2005	Catalina	CSS	H	420 m	MPC · JPL
849231	2005 UL_{32}	—	October 24, 2005	Kitt Peak	Spacewatch	V	380 m	MPC · JPL
849232	2005 US_{33}	—	October 24, 2005	Kitt Peak	Spacewatch	·	640 m	MPC · JPL
849233	2005 UT_{35}	—	September 20, 2001	Socorro	LINEAR	·	920 m	MPC · JPL
849234	2005 UV_{35}	—	October 24, 2005	Kitt Peak	Spacewatch	·	1.2 km	MPC · JPL
849235	2005 UC_{43}	—	September 29, 2005	Kitt Peak	Spacewatch	·	1.4 km	MPC · JPL
849236	2005 UX_{45}	—	October 7, 2005	Kitt Peak	Spacewatch	T_{j} (2.95)	2.6 km	MPC · JPL
849237	2005 UT_{46}	—	October 22, 2005	Kitt Peak	Spacewatch	·	790 m	MPC · JPL
849238	2005 UH_{52}	—	October 23, 2005	Catalina	CSS	·	770 m	MPC · JPL
849239	2005 UH_{56}	—	October 3, 2005	Socorro	LINEAR	·	730 m	MPC · JPL
849240	2005 UG_{75}	—	September 14, 2005	Socorro	LINEAR	(1547)	1.2 km	MPC · JPL
849241	2005 UN_{78}	—	October 25, 2005	Anderson Mesa	LONEOS	·	1.3 km	MPC · JPL
849242	2005 US_{79}	—	October 25, 2005	Mount Lemmon	Mount Lemmon Survey	·	740 m	MPC · JPL
849243	2005 UV_{83}	—	October 5, 2005	Kitt Peak	Spacewatch	·	840 m	MPC · JPL
849244	2005 UA_{97}	—	October 22, 2005	Kitt Peak	Spacewatch	·	1.4 km	MPC · JPL
849245	2005 UL_{104}	—	October 22, 2005	Kitt Peak	Spacewatch	ERI	1.0 km	MPC · JPL
849246	2005 UZ_{111}	—	October 22, 2005	Kitt Peak	Spacewatch	NYS	700 m	MPC · JPL
849247	2005 UO_{112}	—	October 22, 2005	Kitt Peak	Spacewatch	·	2.2 km	MPC · JPL
849248	2005 UT_{117}	—	October 24, 2005	Kitt Peak	Spacewatch	·	700 m	MPC · JPL
849249	2005 UX_{122}	—	October 24, 2005	Kitt Peak	Spacewatch	·	780 m	MPC · JPL
849250	2005 UF_{123}	—	October 24, 2005	Kitt Peak	Spacewatch	JUN	770 m	MPC · JPL
849251	2005 UP_{130}	—	October 24, 2005	Kitt Peak	Spacewatch	NYS	640 m	MPC · JPL
849252	2005 UV_{130}	—	September 30, 2005	Mount Lemmon	Mount Lemmon Survey	·	890 m	MPC · JPL
849253	2005 UC_{134}	—	October 25, 2005	Kitt Peak	Spacewatch	·	2.3 km	MPC · JPL
849254	2005 UO_{140}	—	October 25, 2005	Mount Lemmon	Mount Lemmon Survey	·	1.4 km	MPC · JPL
849255	2005 US_{163}	—	October 24, 2005	Kitt Peak	Spacewatch	·	790 m	MPC · JPL
849256	2005 UU_{173}	—	October 24, 2005	Kitt Peak	Spacewatch	·	1.7 km	MPC · JPL
849257	2005 UN_{176}	—	October 24, 2005	Kitt Peak	Spacewatch	·	510 m	MPC · JPL
849258	2005 UM_{179}	—	October 24, 2005	Kitt Peak	Spacewatch	·	1.3 km	MPC · JPL
849259	2005 UA_{182}	—	October 1, 2005	Mount Lemmon	Mount Lemmon Survey	·	430 m	MPC · JPL
849260	2005 UY_{183}	—	October 25, 2005	Mount Lemmon	Mount Lemmon Survey	·	470 m	MPC · JPL
849261	2005 UQ_{197}	—	October 25, 2005	Kitt Peak	Spacewatch	H	340 m	MPC · JPL
849262	2005 UQ_{198}	—	October 25, 2005	Kitt Peak	Spacewatch	·	730 m	MPC · JPL
849263	2005 UB_{201}	—	September 30, 2005	Mount Lemmon	Mount Lemmon Survey	·	410 m	MPC · JPL
849264	2005 UT_{202}	—	October 25, 2005	Kitt Peak	Spacewatch	·	1.6 km	MPC · JPL
849265	2005 UX_{202}	—	October 25, 2005	Kitt Peak	Spacewatch	·	530 m	MPC · JPL
849266	2005 UR_{204}	—	October 25, 2005	Mount Lemmon	Mount Lemmon Survey	·	780 m	MPC · JPL
849267	2005 UH_{207}	—	October 27, 2005	Kitt Peak	Spacewatch	·	400 m	MPC · JPL
849268	2005 UW_{208}	—	October 1, 2005	Kitt Peak	Spacewatch	·	550 m	MPC · JPL
849269	2005 UV_{214}	—	October 22, 2005	Catalina	CSS	·	830 m	MPC · JPL
849270	2005 UY_{218}	—	October 25, 2005	Kitt Peak	Spacewatch	MRX	760 m	MPC · JPL
849271	2005 UD_{223}	—	October 25, 2005	Kitt Peak	Spacewatch	·	940 m	MPC · JPL
849272	2005 UE_{237}	—	October 25, 2005	Kitt Peak	Spacewatch	·	560 m	MPC · JPL
849273	2005 UO_{237}	—	October 25, 2005	Kitt Peak	Spacewatch	·	420 m	MPC · JPL
849274	2005 UN_{239}	—	October 25, 2005	Kitt Peak	Spacewatch	·	560 m	MPC · JPL
849275	2005 UK_{246}	—	October 22, 2005	Kitt Peak	Spacewatch	·	700 m	MPC · JPL
849276	2005 UO_{249}	—	October 25, 2005	Mount Lemmon	Mount Lemmon Survey	KOR	1 km	MPC · JPL
849277	2005 UA_{264}	—	October 27, 2005	Kitt Peak	Spacewatch	EOS	1.3 km	MPC · JPL
849278	2005 UT_{271}	—	October 28, 2005	Kitt Peak	Spacewatch	·	1.7 km	MPC · JPL
849279	2005 UX_{271}	—	October 28, 2005	Kitt Peak	Spacewatch	·	460 m	MPC · JPL
849280	2005 UR_{276}	—	October 24, 2005	Kitt Peak	Spacewatch	·	1.3 km	MPC · JPL
849281	2005 UZ_{284}	—	October 26, 2005	Kitt Peak	Spacewatch	·	710 m	MPC · JPL
849282	2005 UD_{288}	—	October 26, 2005	Kitt Peak	Spacewatch	·	2.2 km	MPC · JPL
849283	2005 UE_{288}	—	October 26, 2005	Kitt Peak	Spacewatch	·	860 m	MPC · JPL
849284	2005 UO_{288}	—	October 26, 2005	Kitt Peak	Spacewatch	·	480 m	MPC · JPL
849285	2005 UP_{289}	—	October 26, 2005	Kitt Peak	Spacewatch	(5)	770 m	MPC · JPL
849286	2005 UT_{291}	—	October 26, 2005	Kitt Peak	Spacewatch	·	450 m	MPC · JPL
849287	2005 UP_{301}	—	October 26, 2005	Kitt Peak	Spacewatch	·	1.5 km	MPC · JPL
849288	2005 UK_{303}	—	October 26, 2005	Kitt Peak	Spacewatch	·	970 m	MPC · JPL
849289	2005 UO_{311}	—	October 29, 2005	Mount Lemmon	Mount Lemmon Survey	H	330 m	MPC · JPL
849290	2005 UR_{311}	—	September 26, 2005	Kitt Peak	Spacewatch	NYS	760 m	MPC · JPL
849291	2005 UJ_{321}	—	October 22, 2005	Kitt Peak	Spacewatch	MAS	590 m	MPC · JPL
849292	2005 UP_{328}	—	October 28, 2005	Mount Lemmon	Mount Lemmon Survey	·	1.8 km	MPC · JPL
849293	2005 UA_{331}	—	October 25, 2005	Mount Lemmon	Mount Lemmon Survey	·	1 km	MPC · JPL
849294	2005 UK_{331}	—	October 29, 2005	Mount Lemmon	Mount Lemmon Survey	·	1.1 km	MPC · JPL
849295	2005 US_{335}	—	October 26, 2005	Kitt Peak	Spacewatch	·	480 m	MPC · JPL
849296	2005 UP_{383}	—	October 27, 2005	Kitt Peak	Spacewatch	·	750 m	MPC · JPL
849297	2005 UT_{392}	—	October 1, 2005	Kitt Peak	Spacewatch	·	740 m	MPC · JPL
849298	2005 UC_{405}	—	October 29, 2005	Mount Lemmon	Mount Lemmon Survey	THM	1.9 km	MPC · JPL
849299	2005 UU_{417}	—	October 25, 2005	Kitt Peak	Spacewatch	·	740 m	MPC · JPL
849300	2005 UJ_{423}	—	October 28, 2005	Kitt Peak	Spacewatch	LUT	2.4 km	MPC · JPL

== 849301–849400 ==
back to top

Designation			Discovery			Properties		Ref
Permanent	Provisional	Named after	Date	Site	Discoverer(s)	Category	Diam.	Ref
849301	2005 UW_{426}	—	October 28, 2005	Kitt Peak	Spacewatch	·	2.0 km	MPC · JPL
849302	2005 UK_{429}	—	October 28, 2005	Kitt Peak	Spacewatch	·	760 m	MPC · JPL
849303	2005 UU_{434}	—	October 29, 2005	Mount Lemmon	Mount Lemmon Survey	·	450 m	MPC · JPL
849304	2005 UK_{455}	—	October 23, 2005	Catalina	CSS	·	1.8 km	MPC · JPL
849305	2005 UD_{466}	—	October 30, 2005	Kitt Peak	Spacewatch	·	380 m	MPC · JPL
849306	2005 UL_{468}	—	October 30, 2005	Kitt Peak	Spacewatch	·	1.1 km	MPC · JPL
849307	2005 UW_{470}	—	October 30, 2005	Kitt Peak	Spacewatch	·	2.6 km	MPC · JPL
849308	2005 UU_{473}	—	October 31, 2005	Mount Lemmon	Mount Lemmon Survey	PHO	690 m	MPC · JPL
849309	2005 UW_{479}	—	October 31, 2005	Mount Lemmon	Mount Lemmon Survey	·	2.1 km	MPC · JPL
849310	2005 UH_{482}	—	September 2, 2005	Palomar	NEAT	·	890 m	MPC · JPL
849311	2005 UL_{483}	—	September 26, 2005	Kitt Peak	Spacewatch	·	500 m	MPC · JPL
849312	2005 UU_{487}	—	September 30, 2005	Catalina	CSS	·	1.3 km	MPC · JPL
849313	2005 UW_{488}	—	October 23, 2005	Catalina	CSS	·	750 m	MPC · JPL
849314	2005 UF_{501}	—	October 27, 2005	Catalina	CSS	·	1.0 km	MPC · JPL
849315	2005 UM_{514}	—	October 6, 2005	Kitt Peak	Spacewatch	·	1.2 km	MPC · JPL
849316	2005 UT_{520}	—	September 1, 2005	Kitt Peak	Spacewatch	·	2.0 km	MPC · JPL
849317	2005 UG_{522}	—	October 27, 2005	Apache Point	SDSS Collaboration	·	1.9 km	MPC · JPL
849318	2005 UG_{534}	—	January 27, 2007	Kitt Peak	Spacewatch	·	920 m	MPC · JPL
849319	2005 UH_{534}	—	October 30, 2005	Mount Lemmon	Mount Lemmon Survey	·	540 m	MPC · JPL
849320	2005 UH_{536}	—	October 29, 2005	Mount Lemmon	Mount Lemmon Survey	·	460 m	MPC · JPL
849321	2005 UH_{537}	—	January 17, 2013	Haleakala	Pan-STARRS 1	·	490 m	MPC · JPL
849322	2005 UK_{537}	—	October 27, 2005	Kitt Peak	Spacewatch	NYS	710 m	MPC · JPL
849323	2005 UH_{538}	—	January 20, 2015	Haleakala	Pan-STARRS 1	·	770 m	MPC · JPL
849324	2005 UH_{541}	—	September 25, 2012	Mount Lemmon	Mount Lemmon Survey	(2076)	610 m	MPC · JPL
849325	2005 UC_{542}	—	September 23, 2015	Haleakala	Pan-STARRS 1	·	550 m	MPC · JPL
849326	2005 UO_{544}	—	January 4, 2016	Haleakala	Pan-STARRS 1	·	430 m	MPC · JPL
849327	2005 UC_{547}	—	October 25, 2005	Kitt Peak	Spacewatch	·	910 m	MPC · JPL
849328	2005 UX_{548}	—	November 5, 2005	Kitt Peak	Spacewatch	·	2.0 km	MPC · JPL
849329	2005 UY_{548}	—	October 25, 2005	Kitt Peak	Spacewatch	·	810 m	MPC · JPL
849330	2005 UW_{549}	—	October 26, 2005	Kitt Peak	Spacewatch	·	980 m	MPC · JPL
849331	2005 UA_{550}	—	October 26, 2005	Kitt Peak	Spacewatch	·	640 m	MPC · JPL
849332	2005 UH_{550}	—	October 28, 2005	Kitt Peak	Spacewatch	·	1.1 km	MPC · JPL
849333	2005 UD_{553}	—	October 24, 2005	Kitt Peak	Spacewatch	NYS	680 m	MPC · JPL
849334	2005 UE_{553}	—	October 27, 2005	Catalina	CSS	·	1.2 km	MPC · JPL
849335	2005 UR_{553}	—	October 27, 2005	Kitt Peak	Spacewatch	·	740 m	MPC · JPL
849336	2005 UG_{554}	—	October 28, 2005	Mount Lemmon	Mount Lemmon Survey	·	420 m	MPC · JPL
849337	2005 UV_{554}	—	October 22, 2005	Kitt Peak	Spacewatch	·	2.0 km	MPC · JPL
849338	2005 UZ_{554}	—	October 28, 2005	Mount Lemmon	Mount Lemmon Survey	·	410 m	MPC · JPL
849339	2005 UT_{555}	—	October 29, 2005	Mount Lemmon	Mount Lemmon Survey	EMA	1.9 km	MPC · JPL
849340	2005 UU_{555}	—	October 29, 2005	Mount Lemmon	Mount Lemmon Survey	EOS	1.2 km	MPC · JPL
849341	2005 UE_{557}	—	October 27, 2005	Mount Lemmon	Mount Lemmon Survey	V	400 m	MPC · JPL
849342	2005 VH_{21}	—	October 25, 2005	Kitt Peak	Spacewatch	·	370 m	MPC · JPL
849343	2005 VJ_{23}	—	November 1, 2005	Kitt Peak	Spacewatch	(5)	710 m	MPC · JPL
849344	2005 VN_{27}	—	November 3, 2005	Mount Lemmon	Mount Lemmon Survey	·	2.0 km	MPC · JPL
849345	2005 VY_{28}	—	October 25, 2005	Kitt Peak	Spacewatch	(5)	630 m	MPC · JPL
849346	2005 VA_{30}	—	November 4, 2005	Kitt Peak	Spacewatch	MAR	620 m	MPC · JPL
849347	2005 VL_{30}	—	November 4, 2005	Kitt Peak	Spacewatch	·	430 m	MPC · JPL
849348	2005 VO_{34}	—	November 3, 2005	Catalina	CSS	·	1.3 km	MPC · JPL
849349	2005 VL_{36}	—	November 3, 2005	Mount Lemmon	Mount Lemmon Survey	·	2.1 km	MPC · JPL
849350	2005 VH_{37}	—	November 3, 2005	Catalina	CSS	·	750 m	MPC · JPL
849351	2005 VG_{41}	—	November 4, 2005	Mount Lemmon	Mount Lemmon Survey	·	1.5 km	MPC · JPL
849352	2005 VK_{48}	—	November 5, 2005	Mount Lemmon	Mount Lemmon Survey	·	450 m	MPC · JPL
849353	2005 VX_{58}	—	October 27, 2005	Mount Lemmon	Mount Lemmon Survey	·	670 m	MPC · JPL
849354	2005 VG_{62}	—	October 7, 2005	Mount Lemmon	Mount Lemmon Survey	·	1.0 km	MPC · JPL
849355	2005 VH_{63}	—	October 1, 2005	Kitt Peak	Spacewatch	·	990 m	MPC · JPL
849356	2005 VQ_{64}	—	November 4, 2005	Kitt Peak	Spacewatch	THM	1.6 km	MPC · JPL
849357	2005 VB_{109}	—	November 6, 2005	Mount Lemmon	Mount Lemmon Survey	·	1.2 km	MPC · JPL
849358	2005 VG_{111}	—	November 6, 2005	Mount Lemmon	Mount Lemmon Survey	·	450 m	MPC · JPL
849359	2005 VC_{117}	—	November 11, 2005	Kitt Peak	Spacewatch	·	1.1 km	MPC · JPL
849360	2005 VQ_{124}	—	November 2, 2005	Socorro	LINEAR	(1547)	1.0 km	MPC · JPL
849361	2005 VT_{125}	—	October 5, 2005	Mount Lemmon	Mount Lemmon Survey	·	1.3 km	MPC · JPL
849362	2005 VC_{127}	—	November 1, 2005	Mount Lemmon	Mount Lemmon Survey	·	430 m	MPC · JPL
849363	2005 VJ_{131}	—	October 26, 2005	Apache Point	SDSS Collaboration	·	1.1 km	MPC · JPL
849364	2005 VS_{140}	—	November 6, 2005	Mount Lemmon	Mount Lemmon Survey	·	500 m	MPC · JPL
849365	2005 VW_{141}	—	October 22, 2005	Catalina	CSS	·	560 m	MPC · JPL
849366	2005 VX_{144}	—	September 24, 2012	Mount Lemmon	Mount Lemmon Survey	·	670 m	MPC · JPL
849367	2005 VQ_{146}	—	August 18, 2009	Kitt Peak	Spacewatch	·	1.2 km	MPC · JPL
849368	2005 VU_{146}	—	November 11, 2010	Mount Lemmon	Mount Lemmon Survey	·	1.3 km	MPC · JPL
849369	2005 VV_{146}	—	August 10, 2016	Haleakala	Pan-STARRS 1	·	950 m	MPC · JPL
849370	2005 VB_{147}	—	June 6, 2011	Haleakala	Pan-STARRS 1	·	670 m	MPC · JPL
849371	2005 VP_{148}	—	November 19, 2016	Mount Lemmon	Mount Lemmon Survey	·	890 m	MPC · JPL
849372	2005 VA_{149}	—	October 3, 2015	Mount Lemmon	Mount Lemmon Survey	·	440 m	MPC · JPL
849373	2005 VH_{149}	—	November 6, 2005	Kitt Peak	Spacewatch	·	470 m	MPC · JPL
849374	2005 VR_{150}	—	June 5, 2013	Mount Lemmon	Mount Lemmon Survey	·	1.8 km	MPC · JPL
849375	2005 VU_{150}	—	November 1, 2005	Kitt Peak	Spacewatch	·	1.2 km	MPC · JPL
849376	2005 VT_{151}	—	November 12, 2005	Kitt Peak	Spacewatch	·	1.1 km	MPC · JPL
849377	2005 VA_{153}	—	November 12, 2005	Kitt Peak	Spacewatch	NYS	680 m	MPC · JPL
849378	2005 VB_{153}	—	November 12, 2005	Kitt Peak	Spacewatch	EOS	1.3 km	MPC · JPL
849379	2005 VF_{153}	—	November 1, 2005	Mount Lemmon	Mount Lemmon Survey	(5)	800 m	MPC · JPL
849380	2005 VN_{153}	—	November 7, 2005	Mauna Kea	A. Boattini	·	1.2 km	MPC · JPL
849381	2005 VF_{156}	—	November 1, 2005	Kitt Peak	Spacewatch	·	1.5 km	MPC · JPL
849382	2005 VC_{157}	—	November 4, 2005	Kitt Peak	Spacewatch	·	410 m	MPC · JPL
849383	2005 WZ_{1}	—	October 25, 2005	Mount Lemmon	Mount Lemmon Survey	·	470 m	MPC · JPL
849384	2005 WB_{10}	—	November 21, 2005	Kitt Peak	Spacewatch	·	570 m	MPC · JPL
849385	2005 WH_{14}	—	October 27, 2005	Mount Lemmon	Mount Lemmon Survey	·	460 m	MPC · JPL
849386	2005 WJ_{21}	—	November 21, 2005	Kitt Peak	Spacewatch	·	1.0 km	MPC · JPL
849387	2005 WS_{30}	—	November 21, 2005	Kitt Peak	Spacewatch	·	460 m	MPC · JPL
849388	2005 WX_{37}	—	November 22, 2005	Kitt Peak	Spacewatch	NYS	790 m	MPC · JPL
849389	2005 WN_{38}	—	November 22, 2005	Kitt Peak	Spacewatch	LIX	2.9 km	MPC · JPL
849390	2005 WR_{39}	—	November 1, 2005	Mount Lemmon	Mount Lemmon Survey	·	440 m	MPC · JPL
849391	2005 WO_{40}	—	November 25, 2005	Mount Lemmon	Mount Lemmon Survey	·	520 m	MPC · JPL
849392	2005 WC_{42}	—	October 28, 2005	Kitt Peak	Spacewatch	·	470 m	MPC · JPL
849393	2005 WG_{42}	—	October 28, 2005	Kitt Peak	Spacewatch	VER	1.8 km	MPC · JPL
849394	2005 WP_{52}	—	November 25, 2005	Mount Lemmon	Mount Lemmon Survey	NYS	1.0 km	MPC · JPL
849395	2005 WE_{56}	—	October 8, 2005	Catalina	CSS	·	1.2 km	MPC · JPL
849396	2005 WC_{61}	—	November 25, 2005	Mount Lemmon	Mount Lemmon Survey	H	280 m	MPC · JPL
849397	2005 WJ_{69}	—	November 25, 2005	Mount Lemmon	Mount Lemmon Survey	·	430 m	MPC · JPL
849398	2005 WV_{69}	—	November 26, 2005	Kitt Peak	Spacewatch	THM	1.8 km	MPC · JPL
849399	2005 WV_{91}	—	October 1, 2005	Kitt Peak	Spacewatch	·	480 m	MPC · JPL
849400	2005 WD_{95}	—	November 26, 2005	Kitt Peak	Spacewatch	·	1.4 km	MPC · JPL

== 849401–849500 ==
back to top

Designation			Discovery			Properties		Ref
Permanent	Provisional	Named after	Date	Site	Discoverer(s)	Category	Diam.	Ref
849401	2005 WY_{95}	—	October 11, 2001	Kitt Peak	Spacewatch	·	730 m	MPC · JPL
849402	2005 WN_{106}	—	October 29, 2005	Mount Lemmon	Mount Lemmon Survey	·	510 m	MPC · JPL
849403	2005 WF_{129}	—	November 25, 2005	Mount Lemmon	Mount Lemmon Survey	EOS	1.4 km	MPC · JPL
849404	2005 WK_{131}	—	November 12, 2005	Kitt Peak	Spacewatch	·	580 m	MPC · JPL
849405	2005 WQ_{131}	—	November 25, 2005	Mount Lemmon	Mount Lemmon Survey	EOS	1.3 km	MPC · JPL
849406	2005 WZ_{133}	—	November 25, 2005	Mount Lemmon	Mount Lemmon Survey	·	500 m	MPC · JPL
849407	2005 WB_{136}	—	November 26, 2005	Kitt Peak	Spacewatch	·	790 m	MPC · JPL
849408	2005 WT_{144}	—	November 12, 2005	Kitt Peak	Spacewatch	NYS	580 m	MPC · JPL
849409	2005 WF_{145}	—	November 6, 2005	Mount Lemmon	Mount Lemmon Survey	·	1.3 km	MPC · JPL
849410	2005 WR_{145}	—	November 25, 2005	Kitt Peak	Spacewatch	·	870 m	MPC · JPL
849411	2005 WD_{147}	—	November 25, 2005	Kitt Peak	Spacewatch	·	770 m	MPC · JPL
849412	2005 WP_{164}	—	October 29, 2005	Mount Lemmon	Mount Lemmon Survey	·	500 m	MPC · JPL
849413	2005 WY_{165}	—	November 1, 2005	Mount Lemmon	Mount Lemmon Survey	·	860 m	MPC · JPL
849414	2005 WD_{172}	—	November 30, 2005	Mount Lemmon	Mount Lemmon Survey	THM	1.7 km	MPC · JPL
849415	2005 WO_{187}	—	November 26, 2005	Mount Lemmon	Mount Lemmon Survey	·	940 m	MPC · JPL
849416	2005 WF_{199}	—	November 25, 2005	Kitt Peak	Spacewatch	EOS	1.1 km	MPC · JPL
849417	2005 WS_{213}	—	November 29, 2005	Kitt Peak	Spacewatch	·	510 m	MPC · JPL
849418	2005 WA_{214}	—	November 29, 2005	Palomar	NEAT	TIR	2.3 km	MPC · JPL
849419	2005 WJ_{215}	—	January 20, 2015	Haleakala	Pan-STARRS 1	·	1.2 km	MPC · JPL
849420	2005 WQ_{215}	—	January 4, 2017	Haleakala	Pan-STARRS 1	V	390 m	MPC · JPL
849421	2005 WQ_{216}	—	May 27, 2014	Mount Lemmon	Mount Lemmon Survey	·	550 m	MPC · JPL
849422	2005 WQ_{217}	—	November 25, 2005	Kitt Peak	Spacewatch	·	2.0 km	MPC · JPL
849423	2005 WW_{217}	—	November 25, 2005	Kitt Peak	Spacewatch	·	640 m	MPC · JPL
849424	2005 WS_{219}	—	November 22, 2005	Kitt Peak	Spacewatch	·	1.2 km	MPC · JPL
849425	2005 WK_{220}	—	November 30, 2005	Mount Lemmon	Mount Lemmon Survey	·	1.1 km	MPC · JPL
849426	2005 XY_{7}	—	December 3, 1996	Kitt Peak	Spacewatch	AMO +1km	890 m	MPC · JPL
849427	2005 XD_{13}	—	December 1, 2005	Kitt Peak	Spacewatch	H	510 m	MPC · JPL
849428	2005 XR_{14}	—	December 1, 2005	Kitt Peak	Spacewatch	·	800 m	MPC · JPL
849429	2005 XN_{17}	—	December 1, 2005	Kitt Peak	Spacewatch	·	750 m	MPC · JPL
849430	2005 XC_{32}	—	December 3, 2005	Kitt Peak	Spacewatch	·	2.0 km	MPC · JPL
849431	2005 XM_{32}	—	November 25, 2005	Kitt Peak	Spacewatch	·	1.1 km	MPC · JPL
849432	2005 XL_{34}	—	November 30, 2005	Kitt Peak	Spacewatch	·	500 m	MPC · JPL
849433	2005 XG_{39}	—	October 28, 2005	Kitt Peak	Spacewatch	·	590 m	MPC · JPL
849434	2005 XQ_{45}	—	December 2, 2005	Kitt Peak	Spacewatch	·	1.9 km	MPC · JPL
849435	2005 XB_{56}	—	December 5, 2005	Mount Lemmon	Mount Lemmon Survey	·	1.7 km	MPC · JPL
849436	2005 XX_{60}	—	November 1, 2005	Mount Lemmon	Mount Lemmon Survey	·	440 m	MPC · JPL
849437	2005 XV_{63}	—	December 6, 2005	Kitt Peak	Spacewatch	·	550 m	MPC · JPL
849438	2005 XZ_{68}	—	November 25, 2005	Kitt Peak	Spacewatch	·	680 m	MPC · JPL
849439	2005 XG_{71}	—	December 6, 2005	Kitt Peak	Spacewatch	·	460 m	MPC · JPL
849440	2005 XN_{75}	—	December 6, 2005	Kitt Peak	Spacewatch	EUN	820 m	MPC · JPL
849441	2005 XB_{90}	—	December 8, 2005	Kitt Peak	Spacewatch	MAS	630 m	MPC · JPL
849442	2005 XZ_{100}	—	December 1, 2005	Kitt Peak	L. H. Wasserman, R. L. Millis	·	1.8 km	MPC · JPL
849443	2005 XD_{102}	—	December 1, 2005	Kitt Peak	L. H. Wasserman, R. L. Millis	·	1.2 km	MPC · JPL
849444	2005 XY_{104}	—	December 1, 2005	Kitt Peak	L. H. Wasserman, R. L. Millis	·	790 m	MPC · JPL
849445	2005 XC_{105}	—	December 1, 2005	Kitt Peak	L. H. Wasserman, R. L. Millis	·	1.3 km	MPC · JPL
849446	2005 XB_{106}	—	December 1, 2005	Kitt Peak	L. H. Wasserman, R. L. Millis	VER	1.9 km	MPC · JPL
849447	2005 XY_{106}	—	October 31, 2005	Mauna Kea	A. Boattini	L5	7.2 km	MPC · JPL
849448	2005 XN_{108}	—	December 1, 2005	Kitt Peak	L. H. Wasserman, R. L. Millis	·	760 m	MPC · JPL
849449	2005 XA_{110}	—	December 1, 2005	Kitt Peak	L. H. Wasserman, R. L. Millis	·	2.1 km	MPC · JPL
849450	2005 XV_{111}	—	November 26, 2005	Mount Lemmon	Mount Lemmon Survey	·	1.3 km	MPC · JPL
849451	2005 XG_{115}	—	December 2, 2005	Kitt Peak	L. H. Wasserman, R. L. Millis	·	1.2 km	MPC · JPL
849452	2005 XE_{122}	—	January 21, 2015	Haleakala	Pan-STARRS 1	·	1.1 km	MPC · JPL
849453	2005 XM_{123}	—	April 27, 2016	Haleakala	Pan-STARRS 1	H	310 m	MPC · JPL
849454	2005 XS_{124}	—	December 1, 2005	Kitt Peak	Spacewatch	·	420 m	MPC · JPL
849455	2005 XM_{128}	—	February 21, 2017	Haleakala	Pan-STARRS 1	·	770 m	MPC · JPL
849456	2005 XZ_{129}	—	September 9, 2015	Haleakala	Pan-STARRS 1	HYG	2.0 km	MPC · JPL
849457	2005 XB_{130}	—	September 21, 2012	Mount Lemmon	Mount Lemmon Survey	NYS	740 m	MPC · JPL
849458	2005 XW_{131}	—	February 17, 2010	Kitt Peak	Spacewatch	·	440 m	MPC · JPL
849459	2005 XH_{133}	—	December 6, 2005	Mount Lemmon	Mount Lemmon Survey	·	1.3 km	MPC · JPL
849460	2005 XM_{134}	—	December 5, 2005	Mount Lemmon	Mount Lemmon Survey	NYS	880 m	MPC · JPL
849461	2005 XM_{135}	—	December 5, 2005	Mount Lemmon	Mount Lemmon Survey	NYS	1.0 km	MPC · JPL
849462	2005 XR_{135}	—	December 4, 2005	Mount Lemmon	Mount Lemmon Survey	·	1.7 km	MPC · JPL
849463	2005 XX_{135}	—	December 2, 2005	Mount Lemmon	Mount Lemmon Survey	·	1.6 km	MPC · JPL
849464	2005 YD_{13}	—	November 12, 1996	Kitt Peak	Spacewatch	·	1.0 km	MPC · JPL
849465	2005 YY_{24}	—	December 24, 2005	Kitt Peak	Spacewatch	·	1.0 km	MPC · JPL
849466	2005 YC_{27}	—	December 22, 2005	Kitt Peak	Spacewatch	·	1.5 km	MPC · JPL
849467	2005 YN_{45}	—	December 25, 2005	Kitt Peak	Spacewatch	·	1.7 km	MPC · JPL
849468	2005 YA_{57}	—	December 24, 2005	Kitt Peak	Spacewatch	EUN	760 m	MPC · JPL
849469	2005 YS_{70}	—	December 27, 2005	Mount Lemmon	Mount Lemmon Survey	·	2.4 km	MPC · JPL
849470	2005 YN_{88}	—	December 25, 2005	Mount Lemmon	Mount Lemmon Survey	(5)	730 m	MPC · JPL
849471	2005 YB_{96}	—	December 25, 2005	Kitt Peak	Spacewatch	·	510 m	MPC · JPL
849472	2005 YT_{96}	—	November 10, 2005	Kitt Peak	Spacewatch	·	830 m	MPC · JPL
849473	2005 YF_{99}	—	December 28, 2005	Mount Lemmon	Mount Lemmon Survey	MAS	440 m	MPC · JPL
849474	2005 YX_{100}	—	December 24, 2005	Kitt Peak	Spacewatch	·	1.1 km	MPC · JPL
849475	2005 YC_{101}	—	November 7, 2015	Mount Lemmon	Mount Lemmon Survey	·	430 m	MPC · JPL
849476	2005 YF_{101}	—	December 4, 2005	Kitt Peak	Spacewatch	·	2.3 km	MPC · JPL
849477	2005 YL_{105}	—	December 2, 2005	Mount Lemmon	Mount Lemmon Survey	·	750 m	MPC · JPL
849478	2005 YA_{109}	—	December 25, 2005	Kitt Peak	Spacewatch	·	1.3 km	MPC · JPL
849479	2005 YL_{110}	—	December 25, 2005	Kitt Peak	Spacewatch	H	330 m	MPC · JPL
849480	2005 YV_{110}	—	December 4, 2005	Mount Lemmon	Mount Lemmon Survey	·	940 m	MPC · JPL
849481	2005 YM_{111}	—	December 25, 2005	Kitt Peak	Spacewatch	·	1.0 km	MPC · JPL
849482	2005 YT_{112}	—	December 25, 2005	Mount Lemmon	Mount Lemmon Survey	(194)	1.6 km	MPC · JPL
849483	2005 YV_{115}	—	December 25, 2005	Kitt Peak	Spacewatch	·	870 m	MPC · JPL
849484	2005 YM_{118}	—	December 25, 2005	Kitt Peak	Spacewatch	H	510 m	MPC · JPL
849485	2005 YH_{129}	—	December 24, 2005	Kitt Peak	Spacewatch	EUN	900 m	MPC · JPL
849486	2005 YN_{136}	—	December 26, 2005	Kitt Peak	Spacewatch	H	460 m	MPC · JPL
849487	2005 YA_{140}	—	December 5, 2005	Mount Lemmon	Mount Lemmon Survey	·	1.6 km	MPC · JPL
849488	2005 YB_{140}	—	December 28, 2005	Kitt Peak	Spacewatch	·	2.2 km	MPC · JPL
849489	2005 YE_{141}	—	December 28, 2005	Mount Lemmon	Mount Lemmon Survey	·	1.4 km	MPC · JPL
849490	2005 YR_{141}	—	December 24, 2005	Kitt Peak	Spacewatch	MAS	490 m	MPC · JPL
849491	2005 YM_{143}	—	December 6, 2005	Mount Lemmon	Mount Lemmon Survey	·	1.8 km	MPC · JPL
849492	2005 YE_{147}	—	December 29, 2005	Mount Lemmon	Mount Lemmon Survey	·	430 m	MPC · JPL
849493	2005 YK_{151}	—	December 25, 2005	Kitt Peak	Spacewatch	·	510 m	MPC · JPL
849494	2005 YF_{154}	—	December 29, 2005	Mount Lemmon	Mount Lemmon Survey	·	1.3 km	MPC · JPL
849495	2005 YF_{160}	—	December 27, 2005	Kitt Peak	Spacewatch	·	970 m	MPC · JPL
849496	2005 YB_{166}	—	December 26, 2005	Kitt Peak	Spacewatch	·	1.1 km	MPC · JPL
849497	2005 YD_{169}	—	December 30, 2005	Kitt Peak	Spacewatch	·	760 m	MPC · JPL
849498	2005 YO_{177}	—	December 25, 2005	Kitt Peak	Spacewatch	T_{j} (2.96) · 3:2	2.7 km	MPC · JPL
849499	2005 YX_{179}	—	December 5, 2005	Mount Lemmon	Mount Lemmon Survey	TIR	2.3 km	MPC · JPL
849500	2005 YY_{179}	—	December 28, 2005	Mount Lemmon	Mount Lemmon Survey	·	490 m	MPC · JPL

== 849501–849600 ==
back to top

Designation			Discovery			Properties		Ref
Permanent	Provisional	Named after	Date	Site	Discoverer(s)	Category	Diam.	Ref
849501	2005 YA_{187}	—	December 28, 2005	Mount Lemmon	Mount Lemmon Survey	·	1.4 km	MPC · JPL
849502	2005 YU_{187}	—	September 12, 2001	Kitt Peak	Deep Ecliptic Survey	·	600 m	MPC · JPL
849503	2005 YJ_{203}	—	December 25, 2005	Kitt Peak	Spacewatch	·	810 m	MPC · JPL
849504	2005 YR_{204}	—	December 25, 2005	Mount Lemmon	Mount Lemmon Survey	T_{j} (2.89)	2.2 km	MPC · JPL
849505	2005 YO_{205}	—	November 12, 2001	Sacramento Peak	SDSS	·	830 m	MPC · JPL
849506	2005 YF_{206}	—	December 27, 2005	Kitt Peak	Spacewatch	·	710 m	MPC · JPL
849507	2005 YJ_{215}	—	December 29, 2005	Kitt Peak	Spacewatch	MAS	570 m	MPC · JPL
849508	2005 YM_{216}	—	October 31, 2013	Kitt Peak	Spacewatch	·	770 m	MPC · JPL
849509	2005 YZ_{216}	—	December 30, 2005	Kitt Peak	Spacewatch	BRG	920 m	MPC · JPL
849510	2005 YY_{228}	—	December 25, 2005	Kitt Peak	Spacewatch	·	700 m	MPC · JPL
849511	2005 YQ_{230}	—	December 26, 2005	Mount Lemmon	Mount Lemmon Survey	·	910 m	MPC · JPL
849512	2005 YN_{232}	—	December 4, 2005	Kitt Peak	Spacewatch	3:2	3.1 km	MPC · JPL
849513	2005 YB_{233}	—	December 28, 2005	Kitt Peak	Spacewatch	·	1.2 km	MPC · JPL
849514	2005 YR_{233}	—	December 28, 2005	Mount Lemmon	Mount Lemmon Survey	MAS	430 m	MPC · JPL
849515	2005 YR_{248}	—	December 27, 2005	Kitt Peak	Spacewatch	·	740 m	MPC · JPL
849516	2005 YH_{253}	—	November 25, 2005	Mount Lemmon	Mount Lemmon Survey	·	1.0 km	MPC · JPL
849517	2005 YC_{254}	—	December 29, 2005	Kitt Peak	Spacewatch	·	810 m	MPC · JPL
849518	2005 YH_{254}	—	December 6, 2005	Kitt Peak	Spacewatch	·	1.0 km	MPC · JPL
849519	2005 YD_{259}	—	December 24, 2005	Kitt Peak	Spacewatch	·	650 m	MPC · JPL
849520	2005 YW_{261}	—	December 25, 2005	Kitt Peak	Spacewatch	NYS	880 m	MPC · JPL
849521	2005 YQ_{267}	—	December 25, 2005	Mount Lemmon	Mount Lemmon Survey	·	630 m	MPC · JPL
849522	2005 YO_{277}	—	December 25, 2005	Kitt Peak	Spacewatch	·	1.3 km	MPC · JPL
849523	2005 YK_{284}	—	December 28, 2005	Mount Lemmon	Mount Lemmon Survey	·	2.6 km	MPC · JPL
849524	2005 YP_{290}	—	December 30, 2005	Mount Lemmon	Mount Lemmon Survey	·	990 m	MPC · JPL
849525	2005 YT_{296}	—	June 27, 2015	Haleakala	Pan-STARRS 2	·	950 m	MPC · JPL
849526	2005 YA_{297}	—	December 30, 2005	Kitt Peak	Spacewatch	·	1.2 km	MPC · JPL
849527	2005 YK_{299}	—	January 27, 2017	Haleakala	Pan-STARRS 1	MAS	460 m	MPC · JPL
849528	2005 YD_{300}	—	December 25, 2005	Mount Lemmon	Mount Lemmon Survey	·	1.3 km	MPC · JPL
849529	2005 YB_{301}	—	December 24, 2005	Kitt Peak	Spacewatch	·	1.2 km	MPC · JPL
849530	2005 YD_{301}	—	December 29, 2005	Kitt Peak	Spacewatch	·	2.7 km	MPC · JPL
849531	2005 YG_{302}	—	December 30, 2005	Kitt Peak	Spacewatch	·	520 m	MPC · JPL
849532	2005 YK_{302}	—	December 26, 2005	Mount Lemmon	Mount Lemmon Survey	·	2.2 km	MPC · JPL
849533	2005 YY_{302}	—	December 30, 2005	Mount Lemmon	Mount Lemmon Survey	·	710 m	MPC · JPL
849534	2005 YQ_{303}	—	December 29, 2005	Mount Lemmon	Mount Lemmon Survey	·	390 m	MPC · JPL
849535	2006 AH_{17}	—	January 5, 2006	Kitt Peak	Spacewatch	·	590 m	MPC · JPL
849536	2006 AL_{25}	—	December 28, 2005	Mount Lemmon	Mount Lemmon Survey	·	1.2 km	MPC · JPL
849537	2006 AS_{29}	—	January 2, 2006	Mount Lemmon	Mount Lemmon Survey	NYS	710 m	MPC · JPL
849538	2006 AZ_{30}	—	December 25, 2005	Kitt Peak	Spacewatch	·	520 m	MPC · JPL
849539	2006 AR_{36}	—	January 4, 2006	Kitt Peak	Spacewatch	·	2.8 km	MPC · JPL
849540	2006 AM_{37}	—	December 25, 2005	Anderson Mesa	LONEOS	·	2.0 km	MPC · JPL
849541	2006 AU_{43}	—	January 7, 2006	Mount Lemmon	Mount Lemmon Survey	(5)	900 m	MPC · JPL
849542	2006 AR_{44}	—	January 7, 2006	Mount Lemmon	Mount Lemmon Survey	EOS	1.3 km	MPC · JPL
849543	2006 AJ_{46}	—	January 5, 2006	Kitt Peak	Spacewatch	THB	2.0 km	MPC · JPL
849544	2006 AT_{57}	—	January 8, 2006	Mount Lemmon	Mount Lemmon Survey	·	1.5 km	MPC · JPL
849545	2006 AK_{62}	—	December 25, 2005	Kitt Peak	Spacewatch	·	2.3 km	MPC · JPL
849546	2006 AH_{72}	—	December 25, 2005	Mount Lemmon	Mount Lemmon Survey	·	850 m	MPC · JPL
849547	2006 AW_{73}	—	January 9, 2006	Mount Lemmon	Mount Lemmon Survey	·	1.1 km	MPC · JPL
849548	2006 AP_{90}	—	January 6, 2006	Kitt Peak	Spacewatch	·	1.3 km	MPC · JPL
849549	2006 AE_{94}	—	January 8, 2006	Kitt Peak	Spacewatch	·	1.5 km	MPC · JPL
849550	2006 AG_{94}	—	December 22, 2005	Kitt Peak	Spacewatch	·	1 km	MPC · JPL
849551	2006 AN_{94}	—	January 8, 2006	Kitt Peak	Spacewatch	·	2.2 km	MPC · JPL
849552	2006 AD_{103}	—	January 7, 2006	Mauna Kea	P. A. Wiegert, D. D. Balam	BRG	950 m	MPC · JPL
849553	2006 AN_{112}	—	October 11, 2012	Kitt Peak	Spacewatch	·	820 m	MPC · JPL
849554	2006 AX_{113}	—	November 20, 2012	Mount Lemmon	Mount Lemmon Survey	·	710 m	MPC · JPL
849555	2006 AT_{115}	—	January 9, 2006	Kitt Peak	Spacewatch	T_{j} (2.98) · 3:2	3.4 km	MPC · JPL
849556	2006 AE_{116}	—	January 9, 2006	Kitt Peak	Spacewatch	·	860 m	MPC · JPL
849557	2006 AV_{117}	—	January 5, 2006	Mount Lemmon	Mount Lemmon Survey	H	430 m	MPC · JPL
849558	2006 AE_{118}	—	January 10, 2006	Mount Lemmon	Mount Lemmon Survey	MAS	500 m	MPC · JPL
849559	2006 AA_{119}	—	January 7, 2006	Mount Lemmon	Mount Lemmon Survey	·	1.8 km	MPC · JPL
849560	2006 BB_{2}	—	January 20, 2006	Kitt Peak	Spacewatch	TIR	2.0 km	MPC · JPL
849561	2006 BF_{13}	—	January 21, 2006	Mount Lemmon	Mount Lemmon Survey	·	1.2 km	MPC · JPL
849562	2006 BN_{18}	—	January 22, 2006	Mount Lemmon	Mount Lemmon Survey	·	480 m	MPC · JPL
849563	2006 BP_{21}	—	January 22, 2006	Mount Lemmon	Mount Lemmon Survey	(5)	720 m	MPC · JPL
849564	2006 BQ_{23}	—	January 23, 2006	Mount Lemmon	Mount Lemmon Survey	KON	1.4 km	MPC · JPL
849565	2006 BM_{26}	—	January 24, 2006	Piszkéstető	K. Sárneczky	·	920 m	MPC · JPL
849566	2006 BJ_{28}	—	January 7, 2006	Mount Lemmon	Mount Lemmon Survey	·	1.3 km	MPC · JPL
849567	2006 BX_{34}	—	January 7, 2006	Kitt Peak	Spacewatch	BAP	610 m	MPC · JPL
849568	2006 BK_{37}	—	January 23, 2006	Mount Lemmon	Mount Lemmon Survey	BRG	960 m	MPC · JPL
849569	2006 BC_{49}	—	January 25, 2006	Kitt Peak	Spacewatch	·	800 m	MPC · JPL
849570	2006 BU_{49}	—	January 7, 2006	Kitt Peak	Spacewatch	3:2	2.9 km	MPC · JPL
849571	2006 BS_{51}	—	January 25, 2006	Kitt Peak	Spacewatch	·	1.9 km	MPC · JPL
849572	2006 BC_{52}	—	January 25, 2006	Kitt Peak	Spacewatch	·	1.8 km	MPC · JPL
849573	2006 BX_{52}	—	January 25, 2006	Mount Lemmon	Mount Lemmon Survey	·	1.8 km	MPC · JPL
849574	2006 BH_{68}	—	January 23, 2006	Kitt Peak	Spacewatch	·	2.1 km	MPC · JPL
849575	2006 BB_{76}	—	January 23, 2006	Kitt Peak	Spacewatch	·	1.0 km	MPC · JPL
849576	2006 BV_{76}	—	March 23, 2015	Haleakala	Pan-STARRS 1	·	910 m	MPC · JPL
849577	2006 BY_{76}	—	January 23, 2006	Mount Lemmon	Mount Lemmon Survey	·	1.1 km	MPC · JPL
849578	2006 BQ_{84}	—	January 25, 2006	Kitt Peak	Spacewatch	·	2.1 km	MPC · JPL
849579	2006 BR_{88}	—	January 7, 2006	Mount Lemmon	Mount Lemmon Survey	·	1.0 km	MPC · JPL
849580	2006 BZ_{103}	—	January 7, 2006	Mount Lemmon	Mount Lemmon Survey	·	1.2 km	MPC · JPL
849581	2006 BX_{104}	—	January 25, 2006	Kitt Peak	Spacewatch	(5)	820 m	MPC · JPL
849582	2006 BB_{108}	—	January 25, 2006	Kitt Peak	Spacewatch	·	1.3 km	MPC · JPL
849583	2006 BF_{112}	—	January 25, 2006	Kitt Peak	Spacewatch	H	390 m	MPC · JPL
849584	2006 BL_{114}	—	January 25, 2006	Kitt Peak	Spacewatch	THM	1.9 km	MPC · JPL
849585	2006 BA_{123}	—	January 7, 2006	Mount Lemmon	Mount Lemmon Survey	·	920 m	MPC · JPL
849586	2006 BK_{129}	—	January 26, 2006	Mount Lemmon	Mount Lemmon Survey	·	2.2 km	MPC · JPL
849587	2006 BM_{142}	—	January 26, 2006	Mount Lemmon	Mount Lemmon Survey	·	1.0 km	MPC · JPL
849588	2006 BV_{146}	—	January 23, 2006	Kitt Peak	Spacewatch	·	1.4 km	MPC · JPL
849589	2006 BL_{151}	—	January 25, 2006	Kitt Peak	Spacewatch	·	690 m	MPC · JPL
849590	2006 BF_{162}	—	January 26, 2006	Mount Lemmon	Mount Lemmon Survey	·	1.8 km	MPC · JPL
849591	2006 BX_{172}	—	January 27, 2006	Kitt Peak	Spacewatch	·	2.2 km	MPC · JPL
849592	2006 BT_{173}	—	January 27, 2006	Kitt Peak	Spacewatch	·	470 m	MPC · JPL
849593	2006 BF_{174}	—	January 27, 2006	Kitt Peak	Spacewatch	·	2.1 km	MPC · JPL
849594	2006 BT_{175}	—	January 27, 2006	Kitt Peak	Spacewatch	·	2.3 km	MPC · JPL
849595	2006 BG_{182}	—	January 27, 2006	Mount Lemmon	Mount Lemmon Survey	·	1.3 km	MPC · JPL
849596	2006 BF_{185}	—	January 28, 2006	Mount Lemmon	Mount Lemmon Survey	·	1.9 km	MPC · JPL
849597	2006 BR_{192}	—	January 30, 2006	Kitt Peak	Spacewatch	·	1.5 km	MPC · JPL
849598	2006 BU_{193}	—	January 30, 2006	Kitt Peak	Spacewatch	·	1.7 km	MPC · JPL
849599	2006 BU_{196}	—	January 30, 2006	Kitt Peak	Spacewatch	H	360 m	MPC · JPL
849600	2006 BL_{197}	—	January 30, 2006	Kitt Peak	Spacewatch	·	370 m	MPC · JPL

== 849601–849700 ==
back to top

Designation			Discovery			Properties		Ref
Permanent	Provisional	Named after	Date	Site	Discoverer(s)	Category	Diam.	Ref
849601	2006 BF_{203}	—	January 31, 2006	Kitt Peak	Spacewatch	·	850 m	MPC · JPL
849602	2006 BN_{206}	—	January 31, 2006	Mount Lemmon	Mount Lemmon Survey	·	460 m	MPC · JPL
849603	2006 BX_{209}	—	January 31, 2006	Mount Lemmon	Mount Lemmon Survey	CLA	990 m	MPC · JPL
849604	2006 BL_{224}	—	January 30, 2006	Kitt Peak	Spacewatch	EOS	1.1 km	MPC · JPL
849605	2006 BW_{229}	—	January 23, 2006	Kitt Peak	Spacewatch	·	780 m	MPC · JPL
849606	2006 BX_{231}	—	March 30, 2003	Kitt Peak	Deep Ecliptic Survey	·	520 m	MPC · JPL
849607	2006 BD_{234}	—	January 23, 2006	Mount Lemmon	Mount Lemmon Survey	·	870 m	MPC · JPL
849608	2006 BM_{234}	—	January 23, 2006	Kitt Peak	Spacewatch	·	470 m	MPC · JPL
849609	2006 BX_{235}	—	January 31, 2006	Kitt Peak	Spacewatch	(5)	790 m	MPC · JPL
849610	2006 BO_{240}	—	January 31, 2006	Kitt Peak	Spacewatch	·	430 m	MPC · JPL
849611	2006 BA_{244}	—	January 31, 2006	Kitt Peak	Spacewatch	·	1.4 km	MPC · JPL
849612	2006 BE_{245}	—	October 18, 2001	Palomar	NEAT	·	410 m	MPC · JPL
849613	2006 BA_{255}	—	January 31, 2006	Kitt Peak	Spacewatch	·	520 m	MPC · JPL
849614	2006 BH_{271}	—	January 30, 2006	Kitt Peak	Spacewatch	·	1.1 km	MPC · JPL
849615	2006 BC_{286}	—	January 31, 2006	Kitt Peak	Spacewatch	EUN	950 m	MPC · JPL
849616	2006 BM_{286}	—	January 26, 2006	Mount Lemmon	Mount Lemmon Survey	·	440 m	MPC · JPL
849617	2006 BW_{286}	—	September 26, 2013	Mount Lemmon	Mount Lemmon Survey	·	1.1 km	MPC · JPL
849618	2006 BH_{288}	—	October 3, 2008	Mount Lemmon	Mount Lemmon Survey	·	580 m	MPC · JPL
849619	2006 BG_{289}	—	January 23, 2006	Kitt Peak	Spacewatch	·	1.4 km	MPC · JPL
849620	2006 BR_{289}	—	January 9, 2013	Kitt Peak	Spacewatch	·	710 m	MPC · JPL
849621	2006 BD_{292}	—	August 11, 2015	Haleakala	Pan-STARRS 1	·	660 m	MPC · JPL
849622	2006 BG_{292}	—	October 30, 2017	Haleakala	Pan-STARRS 1	(5)	790 m	MPC · JPL
849623	2006 BJ_{292}	—	January 27, 2017	Haleakala	Pan-STARRS 1	·	730 m	MPC · JPL
849624	2006 BO_{293}	—	January 13, 2011	Mount Lemmon	Mount Lemmon Survey	·	1.6 km	MPC · JPL
849625	2006 BA_{294}	—	October 22, 2009	Mount Lemmon	Mount Lemmon Survey	·	1.1 km	MPC · JPL
849626	2006 BG_{294}	—	January 26, 2006	Kitt Peak	Spacewatch	THB	2.0 km	MPC · JPL
849627	2006 BN_{294}	—	April 25, 2015	Haleakala	Pan-STARRS 1	(5)	840 m	MPC · JPL
849628	2006 BO_{294}	—	January 23, 2006	Mount Lemmon	Mount Lemmon Survey	LIX	2.9 km	MPC · JPL
849629	2006 BQ_{296}	—	January 31, 2006	Kitt Peak	Spacewatch	THM	1.8 km	MPC · JPL
849630	2006 BE_{298}	—	January 31, 2006	Mount Lemmon	Mount Lemmon Survey	·	1.8 km	MPC · JPL
849631	2006 BF_{298}	—	January 30, 2006	Kitt Peak	Spacewatch	·	930 m	MPC · JPL
849632	2006 BG_{300}	—	January 23, 2006	Kitt Peak	Spacewatch	·	510 m	MPC · JPL
849633	2006 BF_{301}	—	January 23, 2006	Kitt Peak	Spacewatch	·	2.4 km	MPC · JPL
849634	2006 BP_{301}	—	January 27, 2006	Mount Lemmon	Mount Lemmon Survey	HNS	660 m	MPC · JPL
849635	2006 BP_{302}	—	January 26, 2006	Mount Lemmon	Mount Lemmon Survey	H	370 m	MPC · JPL
849636	2006 BE_{304}	—	January 25, 2006	Kitt Peak	Spacewatch	MAS	420 m	MPC · JPL
849637	2006 BV_{304}	—	January 22, 2006	Mount Lemmon	Mount Lemmon Survey	·	2.0 km	MPC · JPL
849638	2006 CV_{9}	—	February 4, 2006	Catalina	CSS	·	670 m	MPC · JPL
849639	2006 CW_{10}	—	February 7, 2006	Socorro	LINEAR	·	1.4 km	MPC · JPL
849640	2006 CT_{13}	—	February 1, 2006	Kitt Peak	Spacewatch	·	2.4 km	MPC · JPL
849641	2006 CJ_{18}	—	February 1, 2006	Mount Lemmon	Mount Lemmon Survey	·	690 m	MPC · JPL
849642	2006 CM_{21}	—	January 23, 2006	Mount Lemmon	Mount Lemmon Survey	·	1.2 km	MPC · JPL
849643	2006 CX_{36}	—	February 2, 2006	Mount Lemmon	Mount Lemmon Survey	·	1.9 km	MPC · JPL
849644	2006 CY_{52}	—	February 4, 2006	Kitt Peak	Spacewatch	EUN	810 m	MPC · JPL
849645	2006 CX_{57}	—	January 4, 2006	Kitt Peak	Spacewatch	·	890 m	MPC · JPL
849646	2006 CF_{59}	—	February 6, 2006	Kitt Peak	Spacewatch	·	1.9 km	MPC · JPL
849647	2006 CK_{64}	—	November 22, 2005	Kitt Peak	Spacewatch	·	440 m	MPC · JPL
849648	2006 CO_{67}	—	February 6, 2006	Kitt Peak	Spacewatch	TIR	1.7 km	MPC · JPL
849649	2006 CH_{70}	—	February 3, 2006	Mauna Kea	P. A. Wiegert, R. Rasmussen	·	1.5 km	MPC · JPL
849650	2006 CS_{70}	—	February 3, 2006	Mauna Kea	P. A. Wiegert, R. Rasmussen	·	490 m	MPC · JPL
849651	2006 CY_{70}	—	February 3, 2006	Mauna Kea	P. A. Wiegert, R. Rasmussen	THM	1.6 km	MPC · JPL
849652	2006 CV_{77}	—	February 3, 2006	Mauna Kea	P. A. Wiegert, R. Rasmussen	·	1.8 km	MPC · JPL
849653	2006 CV_{80}	—	February 4, 2006	Mount Lemmon	Mount Lemmon Survey	·	820 m	MPC · JPL
849654	2006 CS_{82}	—	November 19, 2009	Mount Lemmon	Mount Lemmon Survey	·	970 m	MPC · JPL
849655	2006 CA_{85}	—	August 12, 2013	Kitt Peak	Spacewatch	MRX	750 m	MPC · JPL
849656	2006 CJ_{86}	—	January 27, 2017	Haleakala	Pan-STARRS 1	·	1.9 km	MPC · JPL
849657	2006 CJ_{87}	—	February 5, 2006	Mount Lemmon	Mount Lemmon Survey	·	1.8 km	MPC · JPL
849658	2006 CL_{87}	—	February 2, 2006	Kitt Peak	Spacewatch	·	1.7 km	MPC · JPL
849659	2006 CT_{87}	—	February 6, 2006	Kitt Peak	Spacewatch	·	880 m	MPC · JPL
849660	2006 CE_{90}	—	May 21, 2014	Haleakala	Pan-STARRS 1	MAS	460 m	MPC · JPL
849661	2006 CM_{90}	—	February 2, 2006	Kitt Peak	Spacewatch	·	2.1 km	MPC · JPL
849662	2006 CM_{91}	—	February 1, 2006	Kitt Peak	Spacewatch	·	590 m	MPC · JPL
849663	2006 CY_{93}	—	February 4, 2006	Mount Lemmon	Mount Lemmon Survey	·	2.1 km	MPC · JPL
849664	2006 DT_{4}	—	February 2, 2006	Mount Lemmon	Mount Lemmon Survey	·	2.3 km	MPC · JPL
849665	2006 DA_{12}	—	January 20, 2006	Kitt Peak	Spacewatch	·	1.1 km	MPC · JPL
849666	2006 DP_{49}	—	February 21, 2006	Mount Lemmon	Mount Lemmon Survey	EUP	3.1 km	MPC · JPL
849667	2006 DT_{62}	—	February 24, 2006	Catalina	CSS	T_{j} (2.92)	1.6 km	MPC · JPL
849668	2006 DJ_{79}	—	February 24, 2006	Kitt Peak	Spacewatch	·	800 m	MPC · JPL
849669	2006 DR_{86}	—	February 24, 2006	Kitt Peak	Spacewatch	·	650 m	MPC · JPL
849670	2006 DC_{89}	—	February 24, 2006	Kitt Peak	Spacewatch	HYG	2.0 km	MPC · JPL
849671	2006 DJ_{102}	—	January 26, 2006	Mount Lemmon	Mount Lemmon Survey	·	580 m	MPC · JPL
849672	2006 DU_{105}	—	February 25, 2006	Mount Lemmon	Mount Lemmon Survey	·	1.4 km	MPC · JPL
849673	2006 DZ_{106}	—	February 25, 2006	Mount Lemmon	Mount Lemmon Survey	·	530 m	MPC · JPL
849674	2006 DN_{109}	—	February 25, 2006	Kitt Peak	Spacewatch	·	820 m	MPC · JPL
849675	2006 DJ_{115}	—	February 21, 2006	Mount Lemmon	Mount Lemmon Survey	THB	2.2 km	MPC · JPL
849676	2006 DX_{123}	—	February 24, 2006	Mount Lemmon	Mount Lemmon Survey	MAS	460 m	MPC · JPL
849677	2006 DS_{131}	—	February 25, 2006	Kitt Peak	Spacewatch	·	2.0 km	MPC · JPL
849678	2006 DQ_{135}	—	January 27, 2006	Kitt Peak	Spacewatch	VER	2.0 km	MPC · JPL
849679	2006 DA_{137}	—	February 25, 2006	Kitt Peak	Spacewatch	NYS	800 m	MPC · JPL
849680	2006 DH_{141}	—	February 25, 2006	Kitt Peak	Spacewatch	·	950 m	MPC · JPL
849681	2006 DG_{143}	—	December 2, 2005	Kitt Peak	L. H. Wasserman, R. L. Millis	·	760 m	MPC · JPL
849682	2006 DB_{144}	—	February 25, 2006	Mount Lemmon	Mount Lemmon Survey	·	700 m	MPC · JPL
849683	2006 DV_{144}	—	February 25, 2006	Mount Lemmon	Mount Lemmon Survey	·	2.0 km	MPC · JPL
849684	2006 DQ_{172}	—	February 27, 2006	Kitt Peak	Spacewatch	·	620 m	MPC · JPL
849685	2006 DD_{175}	—	February 27, 2006	Kitt Peak	Spacewatch	·	1.4 km	MPC · JPL
849686	2006 DO_{176}	—	February 27, 2006	Mount Lemmon	Mount Lemmon Survey	·	2.2 km	MPC · JPL
849687	2006 DD_{178}	—	February 27, 2006	Mount Lemmon	Mount Lemmon Survey	·	780 m	MPC · JPL
849688	2006 DV_{190}	—	February 27, 2006	Kitt Peak	Spacewatch	·	1.0 km	MPC · JPL
849689	2006 DA_{212}	—	December 3, 2005	Mauna Kea	A. Boattini	THM	1.7 km	MPC · JPL
849690	2006 DW_{217}	—	February 21, 2006	Mount Lemmon	Mount Lemmon Survey	·	2.1 km	MPC · JPL
849691	2006 DY_{217}	—	February 24, 2006	Kitt Peak	Spacewatch	H	330 m	MPC · JPL
849692	2006 DQ_{220}	—	August 11, 2015	Haleakala	Pan-STARRS 1	H	400 m	MPC · JPL
849693	2006 DS_{221}	—	September 9, 2008	Kitt Peak	Spacewatch	·	600 m	MPC · JPL
849694	2006 DY_{223}	—	July 25, 2014	Haleakala	Pan-STARRS 1	·	700 m	MPC · JPL
849695	2006 DG_{224}	—	April 24, 2015	Haleakala	Pan-STARRS 1	·	1.1 km	MPC · JPL
849696	2006 DK_{224}	—	March 29, 2012	Haleakala	Pan-STARRS 1	·	2.2 km	MPC · JPL
849697	2006 DO_{224}	—	March 4, 2017	Haleakala	Pan-STARRS 1	·	2.4 km	MPC · JPL
849698	2006 EK_{7}	—	February 2, 2006	Mount Lemmon	Mount Lemmon Survey	·	1.8 km	MPC · JPL
849699	2006 ES_{11}	—	March 2, 2006	Kitt Peak	Spacewatch	·	730 m	MPC · JPL
849700	2006 EZ_{11}	—	March 2, 2006	Kitt Peak	Spacewatch	·	1.3 km	MPC · JPL

== 849701–849800 ==
back to top

Designation			Discovery			Properties		Ref
Permanent	Provisional	Named after	Date	Site	Discoverer(s)	Category	Diam.	Ref
849701	2006 EJ_{17}	—	February 20, 2006	Kitt Peak	Spacewatch	·	1.2 km	MPC · JPL
849702	2006 ET_{24}	—	January 30, 2006	Kitt Peak	Spacewatch	·	2.3 km	MPC · JPL
849703	2006 EH_{29}	—	February 21, 2006	Mount Lemmon	Mount Lemmon Survey	·	930 m	MPC · JPL
849704	2006 EZ_{33}	—	March 3, 2006	Kitt Peak	Spacewatch	(5)	950 m	MPC · JPL
849705	2006 EH_{34}	—	March 3, 2006	Kitt Peak	Spacewatch	MAS	560 m	MPC · JPL
849706	2006 ES_{45}	—	March 2, 2006	Kitt Peak	Spacewatch	H	260 m	MPC · JPL
849707	2006 EQ_{49}	—	March 4, 2006	Kitt Peak	Spacewatch	·	2.2 km	MPC · JPL
849708	2006 EZ_{53}	—	March 4, 2006	Kitt Peak	Spacewatch	·	2.0 km	MPC · JPL
849709	2006 EN_{55}	—	February 2, 2006	Mount Lemmon	Mount Lemmon Survey	H	420 m	MPC · JPL
849710	2006 EE_{57}	—	March 5, 2006	Kitt Peak	Spacewatch	·	1.1 km	MPC · JPL
849711	2006 EV_{58}	—	March 5, 2006	Kitt Peak	Spacewatch	·	470 m	MPC · JPL
849712	2006 EN_{69}	—	March 3, 2006	Kitt Peak	Spacewatch	VER	1.9 km	MPC · JPL
849713	2006 ET_{73}	—	March 2, 2006	Mount Lemmon	Mount Lemmon Survey	·	600 m	MPC · JPL
849714	2006 EM_{78}	—	March 2, 2006	Kitt Peak	Spacewatch	EOS	1.3 km	MPC · JPL
849715	2006 EY_{78}	—	February 20, 2006	Kitt Peak	Spacewatch	NYS	780 m	MPC · JPL
849716	2006 EO_{79}	—	October 27, 2008	Mount Lemmon	Mount Lemmon Survey	MAS	510 m	MPC · JPL
849717	2006 EP_{79}	—	September 20, 2011	Haleakala	Pan-STARRS 1	PHO	640 m	MPC · JPL
849718	2006 EQ_{81}	—	September 25, 2008	Mount Lemmon	Mount Lemmon Survey	·	1.9 km	MPC · JPL
849719	2006 EJ_{82}	—	March 6, 2006	Kitt Peak	Spacewatch	·	1.2 km	MPC · JPL
849720	2006 EA_{83}	—	March 8, 2006	Kitt Peak	Spacewatch	·	700 m	MPC · JPL
849721	2006 ER_{83}	—	March 5, 2006	Kitt Peak	Spacewatch	EUN	800 m	MPC · JPL
849722	2006 FN_{6}	—	March 2, 2006	Kitt Peak	Spacewatch	·	670 m	MPC · JPL
849723	2006 FB_{8}	—	March 23, 2006	Mount Lemmon	Mount Lemmon Survey	·	630 m	MPC · JPL
849724	2006 FV_{21}	—	March 6, 2006	Kitt Peak	Spacewatch	·	2.7 km	MPC · JPL
849725	2006 FG_{36}	—	January 21, 2006	Socorro	LINEAR	AMO	570 m	MPC · JPL
849726	2006 FB_{59}	—	February 8, 2011	Mount Lemmon	Mount Lemmon Survey	THM	1.8 km	MPC · JPL
849727	2006 FG_{59}	—	March 25, 2006	Kitt Peak	Spacewatch	·	1.4 km	MPC · JPL
849728	2006 FJ_{59}	—	January 30, 2006	Kitt Peak	Spacewatch	·	710 m	MPC · JPL
849729	2006 FM_{59}	—	October 1, 2008	Mount Lemmon	Mount Lemmon Survey	·	2.3 km	MPC · JPL
849730	2006 FV_{59}	—	January 1, 2009	Mount Lemmon	Mount Lemmon Survey	·	420 m	MPC · JPL
849731	2006 FM_{60}	—	March 25, 2006	Mount Lemmon	Mount Lemmon Survey	·	1.2 km	MPC · JPL
849732	2006 GX_{4}	—	April 2, 2006	Kitt Peak	Spacewatch	·	890 m	MPC · JPL
849733	2006 GN_{21}	—	March 25, 2006	Mount Lemmon	Mount Lemmon Survey	·	1.1 km	MPC · JPL
849734	2006 GP_{23}	—	April 2, 2006	Kitt Peak	Spacewatch	·	800 m	MPC · JPL
849735	2006 GF_{24}	—	April 2, 2006	Kitt Peak	Spacewatch	·	680 m	MPC · JPL
849736	2006 GX_{24}	—	April 2, 2006	Kitt Peak	Spacewatch	·	790 m	MPC · JPL
849737	2006 GR_{31}	—	April 2, 2006	Kitt Peak	Spacewatch	H	430 m	MPC · JPL
849738	2006 GO_{57}	—	August 16, 2017	Haleakala	Pan-STARRS 1	H	300 m	MPC · JPL
849739	2006 GK_{58}	—	April 8, 2006	Kitt Peak	Spacewatch	·	940 m	MPC · JPL
849740	2006 GQ_{58}	—	March 24, 2006	Mount Lemmon	Mount Lemmon Survey	MAS	500 m	MPC · JPL
849741	2006 GD_{59}	—	April 9, 2006	Mount Lemmon	Mount Lemmon Survey	H	310 m	MPC · JPL
849742	2006 HB	—	April 18, 2006	Kitt Peak	Spacewatch	AMO	580 m	MPC · JPL
849743	2006 HC_{15}	—	April 19, 2006	Mount Lemmon	Mount Lemmon Survey	·	1.6 km	MPC · JPL
849744	2006 HO_{47}	—	April 24, 2006	Kitt Peak	Spacewatch	TIR	2.3 km	MPC · JPL
849745	2006 HM_{54}	—	April 20, 2006	Catalina	CSS	·	270 m	MPC · JPL
849746	2006 HA_{81}	—	April 26, 2006	Kitt Peak	Spacewatch	·	720 m	MPC · JPL
849747	2006 HF_{91}	—	April 29, 2006	Kitt Peak	Spacewatch	EUN	800 m	MPC · JPL
849748	2006 HJ_{94}	—	April 29, 2006	Kitt Peak	Spacewatch	·	2.1 km	MPC · JPL
849749	2006 HN_{97}	—	April 7, 2006	Kitt Peak	Spacewatch	·	440 m	MPC · JPL
849750	2006 HD_{99}	—	April 30, 2006	Kitt Peak	Spacewatch	·	760 m	MPC · JPL
849751	2006 HY_{102}	—	April 30, 2006	Kitt Peak	Spacewatch	NYS	880 m	MPC · JPL
849752	2006 HN_{107}	—	April 30, 2006	Kitt Peak	Spacewatch	·	1.5 km	MPC · JPL
849753	2006 HK_{114}	—	April 26, 2006	Kitt Peak	Spacewatch	·	2.8 km	MPC · JPL
849754	2006 HZ_{114}	—	April 26, 2006	Kitt Peak	Spacewatch	·	490 m	MPC · JPL
849755	2006 HX_{119}	—	April 30, 2006	Kitt Peak	Spacewatch	·	1.0 km	MPC · JPL
849756	2006 HR_{120}	—	April 30, 2006	Kitt Peak	Spacewatch	NYS	840 m	MPC · JPL
849757	2006 HC_{134}	—	April 26, 2006	Cerro Tololo	Deep Ecliptic Survey	·	740 m	MPC · JPL
849758	2006 HS_{135}	—	April 26, 2006	Cerro Tololo	Deep Ecliptic Survey	·	1.1 km	MPC · JPL
849759	2006 HT_{135}	—	April 26, 2006	Cerro Tololo	Deep Ecliptic Survey	·	2.1 km	MPC · JPL
849760	2006 HA_{136}	—	April 26, 2006	Cerro Tololo	Deep Ecliptic Survey	·	710 m	MPC · JPL
849761	2006 HJ_{139}	—	April 26, 2006	Cerro Tololo	Deep Ecliptic Survey	·	2.2 km	MPC · JPL
849762	2006 HT_{143}	—	April 27, 2006	Cerro Tololo	Deep Ecliptic Survey	THM	1.7 km	MPC · JPL
849763	2006 HY_{155}	—	October 28, 2008	Mount Lemmon	Mount Lemmon Survey	·	1.2 km	MPC · JPL
849764	2006 HC_{158}	—	April 29, 2006	Kitt Peak	Spacewatch	·	2.4 km	MPC · JPL
849765	2006 HS_{158}	—	April 24, 2006	Kitt Peak	Spacewatch	·	840 m	MPC · JPL
849766	2006 HZ_{159}	—	April 18, 2006	Kitt Peak	Spacewatch	AEG	1.8 km	MPC · JPL
849767	2006 HA_{160}	—	April 21, 2006	Kitt Peak	Spacewatch	·	780 m	MPC · JPL
849768	2006 HH_{160}	—	April 28, 2006	Cerro Tololo	Deep Ecliptic Survey	·	2.1 km	MPC · JPL
849769	2006 HP_{160}	—	April 30, 2006	Kitt Peak	Spacewatch	·	640 m	MPC · JPL
849770	2006 HY_{160}	—	April 26, 2006	Kitt Peak	Spacewatch	(2076)	570 m	MPC · JPL
849771	2006 HX_{161}	—	April 21, 2006	Kitt Peak	Spacewatch	·	480 m	MPC · JPL
849772	2006 JU_{5}	—	May 3, 2006	Mount Lemmon	Mount Lemmon Survey	·	1.2 km	MPC · JPL
849773	2006 JY_{7}	—	May 1, 2006	Kitt Peak	Spacewatch	·	1.2 km	MPC · JPL
849774	2006 JB_{18}	—	May 2, 2006	Mount Lemmon	Mount Lemmon Survey	·	1.2 km	MPC · JPL
849775	2006 JZ_{25}	—	May 6, 2006	Siding Spring	SSS	AMO	540 m	MPC · JPL
849776	2006 JU_{35}	—	May 4, 2006	Kitt Peak	Spacewatch	·	880 m	MPC · JPL
849777	2006 JC_{43}	—	May 3, 2006	Kitt Peak	Spacewatch	·	1.2 km	MPC · JPL
849778	2006 JB_{51}	—	May 2, 2006	Mount Lemmon	Mount Lemmon Survey	·	2.3 km	MPC · JPL
849779	2006 JU_{59}	—	May 1, 2006	Kitt Peak	Deep Ecliptic Survey	·	2.2 km	MPC · JPL
849780	2006 JB_{60}	—	May 1, 2006	Kitt Peak	Deep Ecliptic Survey	·	1.8 km	MPC · JPL
849781	2006 JJ_{72}	—	May 1, 2006	Mauna Kea	P. A. Wiegert	·	580 m	MPC · JPL
849782	2006 JP_{72}	—	May 1, 2006	Mauna Kea	P. A. Wiegert	·	1.0 km	MPC · JPL
849783	2006 JY_{74}	—	May 1, 2006	Mauna Kea	P. A. Wiegert	·	1.2 km	MPC · JPL
849784	2006 JA_{76}	—	May 1, 2006	Mauna Kea	P. A. Wiegert	·	1.2 km	MPC · JPL
849785	2006 JO_{77}	—	May 1, 2006	Mauna Kea	P. A. Wiegert	THM	1.6 km	MPC · JPL
849786	2006 JV_{81}	—	March 24, 2006	Mount Lemmon	Mount Lemmon Survey	·	470 m	MPC · JPL
849787	2006 JW_{83}	—	February 8, 2011	Mount Lemmon	Mount Lemmon Survey	·	2.0 km	MPC · JPL
849788	2006 JD_{84}	—	February 25, 2011	Mount Lemmon	Mount Lemmon Survey	THM	1.7 km	MPC · JPL
849789	2006 JQ_{84}	—	November 17, 2014	Haleakala	Pan-STARRS 1	TIR	2.5 km	MPC · JPL
849790	2006 JT_{84}	—	May 1, 2006	Kitt Peak	Spacewatch	·	1.1 km	MPC · JPL
849791	2006 JK_{85}	—	July 3, 2016	Mount Lemmon	Mount Lemmon Survey	·	460 m	MPC · JPL
849792	2006 JP_{86}	—	August 25, 2014	Haleakala	Pan-STARRS 1	PHO	570 m	MPC · JPL
849793	2006 JR_{86}	—	March 25, 2017	Mount Lemmon	Mount Lemmon Survey	LIX	2.2 km	MPC · JPL
849794	2006 JT_{86}	—	May 2, 2006	Mount Lemmon	Mount Lemmon Survey	·	2.5 km	MPC · JPL
849795	2006 JV_{88}	—	April 5, 2019	Haleakala	Pan-STARRS 1	H	270 m	MPC · JPL
849796	2006 JT_{90}	—	January 3, 2013	Mount Lemmon	Mount Lemmon Survey	·	800 m	MPC · JPL
849797	2006 KB_{7}	—	May 19, 2006	Mount Lemmon	Mount Lemmon Survey	·	880 m	MPC · JPL
849798	2006 KE_{21}	—	May 21, 2006	Kitt Peak	Spacewatch	·	980 m	MPC · JPL
849799	2006 KP_{29}	—	October 22, 2003	Kitt Peak	Spacewatch	·	810 m	MPC · JPL
849800	2006 KA_{40}	—	May 25, 2006	Mount Lemmon	Mount Lemmon Survey	AMO	450 m	MPC · JPL

== 849801–849900 ==
back to top

Designation			Discovery			Properties		Ref
Permanent	Provisional	Named after	Date	Site	Discoverer(s)	Category	Diam.	Ref
849801	2006 KY_{41}	—	April 30, 2006	Kitt Peak	Spacewatch	·	1.6 km	MPC · JPL
849802	2006 KM_{48}	—	May 21, 2006	Kitt Peak	Spacewatch	·	760 m	MPC · JPL
849803	2006 KC_{52}	—	May 21, 2006	Kitt Peak	Spacewatch	·	840 m	MPC · JPL
849804	2006 KQ_{59}	—	May 22, 2006	Kitt Peak	Spacewatch	LIX	2.8 km	MPC · JPL
849805	2006 KC_{68}	—	May 20, 2006	Kitt Peak	Spacewatch	·	2.4 km	MPC · JPL
849806	2006 KE_{69}	—	May 21, 2006	Kitt Peak	Spacewatch	EUN	740 m	MPC · JPL
849807	2006 KJ_{69}	—	May 22, 2006	Kitt Peak	Spacewatch	·	1.3 km	MPC · JPL
849808	2006 KN_{72}	—	May 22, 2006	Kitt Peak	Spacewatch	·	1.4 km	MPC · JPL
849809	2006 KW_{74}	—	May 23, 2006	Kitt Peak	Spacewatch	PHO	540 m	MPC · JPL
849810	2006 KA_{79}	—	May 24, 2006	Mount Lemmon	Mount Lemmon Survey	·	1.1 km	MPC · JPL
849811	2006 KH_{87}	—	May 24, 2006	Kitt Peak	Spacewatch	·	780 m	MPC · JPL
849812	2006 KS_{95}	—	May 25, 2006	Kitt Peak	Spacewatch	HNS	790 m	MPC · JPL
849813	2006 KU_{100}	—	May 24, 2006	Kitt Peak	Spacewatch	·	1.2 km	MPC · JPL
849814	2006 KC_{109}	—	April 19, 2006	Kitt Peak	Spacewatch	EOS	1.4 km	MPC · JPL
849815	2006 KY_{114}	—	May 19, 2006	Mount Lemmon	Mount Lemmon Survey	H	380 m	MPC · JPL
849816	2006 KW_{127}	—	May 25, 2006	Mauna Kea	P. A. Wiegert	MAS	580 m	MPC · JPL
849817	2006 KU_{128}	—	May 25, 2006	Mauna Kea	P. A. Wiegert	·	2.2 km	MPC · JPL
849818	2006 KP_{129}	—	May 25, 2006	Mauna Kea	P. A. Wiegert	TIR	1.6 km	MPC · JPL
849819	2006 KT_{130}	—	May 25, 2006	Mauna Kea	P. A. Wiegert	·	1.6 km	MPC · JPL
849820	2006 KZ_{130}	—	May 25, 2006	Mauna Kea	P. A. Wiegert	·	410 m	MPC · JPL
849821	2006 KB_{131}	—	May 25, 2006	Mauna Kea	P. A. Wiegert	THM	1.8 km	MPC · JPL
849822	2006 KY_{131}	—	May 25, 2006	Mauna Kea	P. A. Wiegert	·	670 m	MPC · JPL
849823	2006 KS_{136}	—	May 23, 2006	Mount Lemmon	Mount Lemmon Survey	PHO	660 m	MPC · JPL
849824	2006 KX_{147}	—	September 12, 2007	Mount Lemmon	Mount Lemmon Survey	·	1.4 km	MPC · JPL
849825	2006 KO_{151}	—	August 5, 2018	Haleakala	Pan-STARRS 1	·	2.2 km	MPC · JPL
849826	2006 KV_{152}	—	September 4, 2011	Haleakala	Pan-STARRS 1	(5)	870 m	MPC · JPL
849827	2006 KB_{153}	—	February 15, 2012	Haleakala	Pan-STARRS 1	·	430 m	MPC · JPL
849828	2006 KE_{153}	—	July 28, 2011	Haleakala	Pan-STARRS 1	·	1.1 km	MPC · JPL
849829	2006 KX_{153}	—	February 28, 2014	Haleakala	Pan-STARRS 1	·	870 m	MPC · JPL
849830	2006 KF_{156}	—	November 14, 2007	Kitt Peak	Spacewatch	NYS	700 m	MPC · JPL
849831	2006 KK_{157}	—	May 23, 2006	Mount Lemmon	Mount Lemmon Survey	THB	2.3 km	MPC · JPL
849832	2006 MU	—	June 16, 2006	Kitt Peak	Spacewatch	·	1.9 km	MPC · JPL
849833	2006 MW_{1}	—	June 19, 2006	Mount Lemmon	Mount Lemmon Survey	AMO	390 m	MPC · JPL
849834	2006 MB_{2}	—	May 23, 2006	Kitt Peak	Spacewatch	·	1.2 km	MPC · JPL
849835	2006 MX_{13}	—	June 27, 2006	Siding Spring	SSS	AMO	390 m	MPC · JPL
849836	2006 OR_{3}	—	July 21, 2006	Mount Lemmon	Mount Lemmon Survey	·	1.2 km	MPC · JPL
849837	2006 OM_{21}	—	July 25, 2006	Mount Lemmon	Mount Lemmon Survey	·	1.1 km	MPC · JPL
849838	2006 OB_{25}	—	July 19, 2006	Mauna Kea	P. A. Wiegert, D. Subasinghe	·	1.2 km	MPC · JPL
849839	2006 OR_{25}	—	July 19, 2006	Mauna Kea	P. A. Wiegert, D. Subasinghe	·	650 m	MPC · JPL
849840	2006 OE_{27}	—	July 19, 2006	Mauna Kea	P. A. Wiegert, D. Subasinghe	·	2.1 km	MPC · JPL
849841	2006 OU_{29}	—	July 19, 2006	Mauna Kea	P. A. Wiegert, D. Subasinghe	HOF	1.7 km	MPC · JPL
849842	2006 OW_{33}	—	July 19, 2006	Mauna Kea	P. A. Wiegert, D. Subasinghe	·	1.2 km	MPC · JPL
849843	2006 OT_{38}	—	July 21, 2006	Mount Lemmon	Mount Lemmon Survey	V	540 m	MPC · JPL
849844	2006 OT_{40}	—	July 4, 2021	Haleakala	Pan-STARRS 1	·	780 m	MPC · JPL
849845	2006 PP_{14}	—	August 17, 2006	Palomar	NEAT	·	1.8 km	MPC · JPL
849846	2006 QV_{3}	—	August 18, 2006	Kitt Peak	Spacewatch	·	780 m	MPC · JPL
849847	2006 QV_{6}	—	August 17, 2006	Palomar	NEAT	·	1.3 km	MPC · JPL
849848	2006 QA_{8}	—	August 19, 2006	Kitt Peak	Spacewatch	THM	1.5 km	MPC · JPL
849849	2006 QD_{8}	—	August 19, 2006	Kitt Peak	Spacewatch	·	370 m	MPC · JPL
849850	2006 QW_{9}	—	August 20, 2006	Kitt Peak	Spacewatch	NYS	860 m	MPC · JPL
849851	2006 QB_{10}	—	August 20, 2006	Kitt Peak	Spacewatch	MAS	550 m	MPC · JPL
849852	2006 QR_{14}	—	August 17, 2006	Palomar	NEAT	·	870 m	MPC · JPL
849853	2006 QP_{22}	—	August 19, 2006	Kitt Peak	Spacewatch	·	680 m	MPC · JPL
849854	2006 QW_{26}	—	July 18, 2006	Mount Lemmon	Mount Lemmon Survey	·	1.1 km	MPC · JPL
849855	2006 QX_{28}	—	August 21, 2006	Kitt Peak	Spacewatch	·	1.2 km	MPC · JPL
849856	2006 QF_{35}	—	August 17, 2006	Palomar	NEAT	·	600 m	MPC · JPL
849857	2006 QH_{43}	—	August 18, 2006	Kitt Peak	Spacewatch	·	1.1 km	MPC · JPL
849858	2006 QG_{48}	—	August 21, 2006	Kitt Peak	Spacewatch	·	1.4 km	MPC · JPL
849859	2006 QV_{55}	—	August 22, 2006	Saint-Sulpice	B. Christophe	·	860 m	MPC · JPL
849860	2006 QL_{56}	—	August 20, 2006	Kitt Peak	Spacewatch	·	1.2 km	MPC · JPL
849861	2006 QC_{58}	—	August 20, 2006	Palomar	NEAT	·	610 m	MPC · JPL
849862	2006 QC_{61}	—	August 19, 2006	Kitt Peak	Spacewatch	·	1.8 km	MPC · JPL
849863	2006 QM_{61}	—	August 22, 2006	Palomar	NEAT	·	480 m	MPC · JPL
849864	2006 QZ_{63}	—	August 25, 2006	Socorro	LINEAR	·	1.2 km	MPC · JPL
849865	2006 QC_{64}	—	August 19, 2006	Kitt Peak	Spacewatch	·	800 m	MPC · JPL
849866	2006 QW_{64}	—	August 19, 2006	Kitt Peak	Spacewatch	·	770 m	MPC · JPL
849867	2006 QG_{71}	—	August 21, 2006	Kitt Peak	Spacewatch	·	1.0 km	MPC · JPL
849868	2006 QL_{71}	—	August 21, 2006	Kitt Peak	Spacewatch	·	1.3 km	MPC · JPL
849869	2006 QB_{72}	—	August 21, 2006	Kitt Peak	Spacewatch	MAS	690 m	MPC · JPL
849870	2006 QW_{73}	—	August 21, 2006	Kitt Peak	Spacewatch	·	1.9 km	MPC · JPL
849871	2006 QJ_{74}	—	August 21, 2006	Kitt Peak	Spacewatch	·	750 m	MPC · JPL
849872	2006 QM_{76}	—	August 21, 2006	Kitt Peak	Spacewatch	·	940 m	MPC · JPL
849873	2006 QK_{84}	—	August 27, 2006	Kitt Peak	Spacewatch	·	2.0 km	MPC · JPL
849874	2006 QH_{85}	—	August 19, 2006	Kitt Peak	Spacewatch	·	770 m	MPC · JPL
849875	2006 QO_{86}	—	August 27, 2006	Kitt Peak	Spacewatch	PHO	680 m	MPC · JPL
849876	2006 QV_{87}	—	August 19, 2006	Kitt Peak	Spacewatch	·	870 m	MPC · JPL
849877	2006 QU_{89}	—	August 29, 2006	Kitt Peak	Spacewatch	AMO	230 m	MPC · JPL
849878	2006 QZ_{93}	—	August 19, 2006	Anderson Mesa	LONEOS	·	950 m	MPC · JPL
849879	2006 QL_{98}	—	August 22, 2006	Palomar	NEAT	·	2.0 km	MPC · JPL
849880	2006 QK_{103}	—	August 27, 2006	Kitt Peak	Spacewatch	·	1.5 km	MPC · JPL
849881	2006 QV_{106}	—	August 28, 2006	Catalina	CSS	·	550 m	MPC · JPL
849882	2006 QN_{108}	—	August 28, 2006	Catalina	CSS	T_{j} (2.92)	2.4 km	MPC · JPL
849883	2006 QK_{111}	—	August 29, 2006	Lulin	LUSS	·	530 m	MPC · JPL
849884	2006 QW_{118}	—	July 25, 2006	Palomar	NEAT	·	1.4 km	MPC · JPL
849885	2006 QP_{119}	—	July 25, 2006	Mount Lemmon	Mount Lemmon Survey	·	970 m	MPC · JPL
849886	2006 QS_{134}	—	August 30, 2006	Anderson Mesa	LONEOS	·	610 m	MPC · JPL
849887	2006 QP_{136}	—	August 29, 2006	Catalina	CSS	·	570 m	MPC · JPL
849888	2006 QK_{143}	—	August 31, 2006	Mauna Kea	Veillet, C.	·	2.3 km	MPC · JPL
849889	2006 QA_{154}	—	August 19, 2006	Kitt Peak	Spacewatch	·	480 m	MPC · JPL
849890	2006 QO_{160}	—	July 25, 2006	Mount Lemmon	Mount Lemmon Survey	MAS	600 m	MPC · JPL
849891	2006 QG_{168}	—	August 30, 2006	Anderson Mesa	LONEOS	·	1.2 km	MPC · JPL
849892	2006 QL_{178}	—	August 21, 2006	Kitt Peak	Spacewatch	NYS	670 m	MPC · JPL
849893	2006 QS_{178}	—	August 21, 2006	Kitt Peak	Spacewatch	·	500 m	MPC · JPL
849894	2006 QT_{184}	—	August 20, 2006	Kitt Peak	Spacewatch	(5)	1.2 km	MPC · JPL
849895	2006 QD_{190}	—	August 29, 2006	Kitt Peak	Spacewatch	·	520 m	MPC · JPL
849896	2006 QV_{190}	—	August 17, 2006	Palomar	NEAT	·	800 m	MPC · JPL
849897	2006 QH_{191}	—	August 19, 2006	Kitt Peak	Spacewatch	·	680 m	MPC · JPL
849898	2006 QL_{191}	—	September 19, 2010	Kitt Peak	Spacewatch	·	880 m	MPC · JPL
849899	2006 QU_{191}	—	December 21, 2014	Haleakala	Pan-STARRS 1	·	850 m	MPC · JPL
849900	2006 QE_{193}	—	October 10, 2012	Mount Lemmon	Mount Lemmon Survey	·	2.1 km	MPC · JPL

== 849901–850000 ==
back to top

Designation			Discovery			Properties		Ref
Permanent	Provisional	Named after	Date	Site	Discoverer(s)	Category	Diam.	Ref
849901	2006 QB_{194}	—	August 12, 2013	Haleakala	Pan-STARRS 1	V	360 m	MPC · JPL
849902	2006 QT_{194}	—	August 28, 2006	Kitt Peak	Spacewatch	·	1.0 km	MPC · JPL
849903	2006 QE_{195}	—	May 8, 2014	Haleakala	Pan-STARRS 1	·	940 m	MPC · JPL
849904	2006 QH_{196}	—	July 5, 2016	Mount Lemmon	Mount Lemmon Survey	·	530 m	MPC · JPL
849905	2006 QW_{196}	—	August 21, 2006	Kitt Peak	Spacewatch	·	960 m	MPC · JPL
849906	2006 QM_{198}	—	April 24, 2014	Mount Lemmon	Mount Lemmon Survey	·	1.1 km	MPC · JPL
849907	2006 QQ_{199}	—	October 9, 2010	Mount Lemmon	Mount Lemmon Survey	MAS	510 m	MPC · JPL
849908	2006 QX_{199}	—	August 19, 2006	Kitt Peak	Spacewatch	·	1.8 km	MPC · JPL
849909	2006 QC_{202}	—	August 14, 2013	Haleakala	Pan-STARRS 1	·	520 m	MPC · JPL
849910	2006 QD_{202}	—	November 17, 2015	Haleakala	Pan-STARRS 1	·	810 m	MPC · JPL
849911	2006 QT_{202}	—	August 19, 2006	Kitt Peak	Spacewatch	·	920 m	MPC · JPL
849912	2006 QN_{203}	—	August 27, 2006	Kitt Peak	Spacewatch	·	720 m	MPC · JPL
849913	2006 QE_{204}	—	August 28, 2006	Kitt Peak	Spacewatch	·	580 m	MPC · JPL
849914	2006 QF_{204}	—	August 29, 2006	Kitt Peak	Spacewatch	·	1.1 km	MPC · JPL
849915	2006 QA_{205}	—	August 28, 2006	Kitt Peak	Spacewatch	TIN	740 m	MPC · JPL
849916	2006 QU_{205}	—	August 21, 2006	Kitt Peak	Spacewatch	·	1.3 km	MPC · JPL
849917	2006 QW_{206}	—	August 28, 2006	Catalina	CSS	·	990 m	MPC · JPL
849918	2006 QF_{207}	—	August 21, 2006	Kitt Peak	Spacewatch	3:2	3.9 km	MPC · JPL
849919	2006 QH_{207}	—	August 27, 2006	Kitt Peak	Spacewatch	·	1.2 km	MPC · JPL
849920	2006 QN_{207}	—	August 21, 2006	Kitt Peak	Spacewatch	·	860 m	MPC · JPL
849921	2006 QN_{208}	—	August 27, 2006	Kitt Peak	Spacewatch	·	560 m	MPC · JPL
849922	2006 QH_{209}	—	August 16, 2006	Palomar	NEAT	·	550 m	MPC · JPL
849923	2006 QL_{210}	—	August 28, 2006	Catalina	CSS	·	510 m	MPC · JPL
849924	2006 QV_{210}	—	August 19, 2006	Kitt Peak	Spacewatch	·	820 m	MPC · JPL
849925	2006 RO_{1}	—	August 27, 2006	Anderson Mesa	LONEOS	·	460 m	MPC · JPL
849926	2006 RR_{1}	—	September 12, 2006	Altschwendt	W. Ries	·	710 m	MPC · JPL
849927	2006 RW_{9}	—	September 12, 2006	Catalina	CSS	·	1.3 km	MPC · JPL
849928	2006 RD_{13}	—	June 20, 2006	Mount Lemmon	Mount Lemmon Survey	·	1.2 km	MPC · JPL
849929	2006 RN_{22}	—	August 29, 2006	Anderson Mesa	LONEOS	T_{j} (2.97) · 3:2	4.6 km	MPC · JPL
849930	2006 RB_{30}	—	September 15, 2006	Kitt Peak	Spacewatch	EOS	1.4 km	MPC · JPL
849931	2006 RV_{41}	—	September 14, 2006	Kitt Peak	Spacewatch	·	2.1 km	MPC · JPL
849932	2006 RA_{43}	—	September 14, 2006	Kitt Peak	Spacewatch	·	560 m	MPC · JPL
849933	2006 RZ_{50}	—	September 14, 2006	Kitt Peak	Spacewatch	·	870 m	MPC · JPL
849934	2006 RM_{51}	—	September 14, 2006	Kitt Peak	Spacewatch	NYS	690 m	MPC · JPL
849935	2006 RA_{55}	—	September 14, 2006	Kitt Peak	Spacewatch	AMO	420 m	MPC · JPL
849936	2006 RB_{63}	—	September 14, 2006	Catalina	CSS	·	1.5 km	MPC · JPL
849937	2006 RS_{67}	—	September 15, 2006	Kitt Peak	Spacewatch	·	1.2 km	MPC · JPL
849938	2006 RO_{68}	—	August 18, 2006	Kitt Peak	Spacewatch	3:2	4.1 km	MPC · JPL
849939	2006 RX_{76}	—	September 15, 2006	Kitt Peak	Spacewatch	·	1.5 km	MPC · JPL
849940	2006 RH_{77}	—	September 15, 2006	Kitt Peak	Spacewatch	·	2.1 km	MPC · JPL
849941	2006 RE_{83}	—	September 15, 2006	Kitt Peak	Spacewatch	·	660 m	MPC · JPL
849942	2006 RK_{84}	—	September 15, 2006	Kitt Peak	Spacewatch	·	2.2 km	MPC · JPL
849943	2006 RO_{84}	—	September 15, 2006	Kitt Peak	Spacewatch	·	1.2 km	MPC · JPL
849944	2006 RC_{90}	—	September 15, 2006	Kitt Peak	Spacewatch	·	1.8 km	MPC · JPL
849945	2006 RW_{91}	—	September 15, 2006	Kitt Peak	Spacewatch	·	610 m	MPC · JPL
849946	2006 RU_{92}	—	September 15, 2006	Kitt Peak	Spacewatch	·	800 m	MPC · JPL
849947	2006 RZ_{103}	—	September 20, 2006	Kitt Peak	Spacewatch	·	1.6 km	MPC · JPL
849948	2006 RM_{113}	—	September 18, 2006	Kitt Peak	Spacewatch	·	2.2 km	MPC · JPL
849949	2006 RF_{115}	—	September 14, 2006	Mauna Kea	Masiero, J., R. Jedicke	(5)	740 m	MPC · JPL
849950	2006 RH_{115}	—	September 14, 2006	Kitt Peak	Spacewatch	·	470 m	MPC · JPL
849951	2006 RE_{116}	—	October 21, 2006	Mount Lemmon	Mount Lemmon Survey	·	1.9 km	MPC · JPL
849952	2006 RS_{116}	—	September 25, 2006	Mount Lemmon	Mount Lemmon Survey	·	1.5 km	MPC · JPL
849953	2006 RF_{119}	—	September 25, 2006	Mount Lemmon	Mount Lemmon Survey	KOR	920 m	MPC · JPL
849954	2006 RN_{119}	—	September 14, 2006	Mauna Kea	Masiero, J., R. Jedicke	·	1.0 km	MPC · JPL
849955	2006 RZ_{119}	—	September 19, 2006	Kitt Peak	Spacewatch	·	1.3 km	MPC · JPL
849956	2006 RA_{121}	—	September 15, 2006	Kitt Peak	Spacewatch	·	720 m	MPC · JPL
849957	2006 RK_{124}	—	September 15, 2006	Kitt Peak	Spacewatch	·	1.2 km	MPC · JPL
849958	2006 RS_{125}	—	September 15, 2006	Kitt Peak	Spacewatch	DOR	1.3 km	MPC · JPL
849959	2006 SW_{1}	—	September 16, 2006	Catalina	CSS	·	1.4 km	MPC · JPL
849960	2006 SQ_{6}	—	August 25, 2006	Lulin	LUSS	·	850 m	MPC · JPL
849961	2006 SC_{7}	—	September 18, 2006	Catalina	CSS	·	360 m	MPC · JPL
849962	2006 SE_{7}	—	August 16, 2006	Palomar	NEAT	·	950 m	MPC · JPL
849963	2006 SJ_{9}	—	May 26, 2006	Mount Lemmon	Mount Lemmon Survey	·	1.2 km	MPC · JPL
849964	2006 ST_{16}	—	August 19, 2006	Anderson Mesa	LONEOS	·	1.1 km	MPC · JPL
849965	2006 SS_{21}	—	September 17, 2006	Catalina	CSS	·	1.1 km	MPC · JPL
849966	2006 SV_{21}	—	September 17, 2006	Catalina	CSS	·	510 m	MPC · JPL
849967	2006 SJ_{24}	—	August 29, 2006	Catalina	CSS	·	1.0 km	MPC · JPL
849968	2006 SN_{24}	—	September 16, 2006	Catalina	CSS	BAP	670 m	MPC · JPL
849969	2006 SV_{39}	—	September 18, 2006	Catalina	CSS	NYS	880 m	MPC · JPL
849970	2006 SM_{58}	—	September 19, 2006	Kitt Peak	Spacewatch	·	870 m	MPC · JPL
849971	2006 SD_{66}	—	September 15, 2006	Kitt Peak	Spacewatch	·	410 m	MPC · JPL
849972	2006 SY_{66}	—	September 19, 2006	Kitt Peak	Spacewatch	·	1.5 km	MPC · JPL
849973	2006 SJ_{73}	—	September 19, 2006	Kitt Peak	Spacewatch	·	920 m	MPC · JPL
849974	2006 SO_{79}	—	September 17, 2006	Catalina	CSS	·	1.0 km	MPC · JPL
849975	2006 SQ_{83}	—	September 18, 2006	Kitt Peak	Spacewatch	·	1.2 km	MPC · JPL
849976	2006 SH_{89}	—	September 18, 2006	Kitt Peak	Spacewatch	·	600 m	MPC · JPL
849977	2006 SD_{93}	—	September 18, 2006	Kitt Peak	Spacewatch	·	990 m	MPC · JPL
849978	2006 SB_{98}	—	September 18, 2006	Kitt Peak	Spacewatch	·	600 m	MPC · JPL
849979	2006 SC_{98}	—	September 18, 2006	Kitt Peak	Spacewatch	GEF	730 m	MPC · JPL
849980	2006 SO_{99}	—	September 18, 2006	Kitt Peak	Spacewatch	·	1.0 km	MPC · JPL
849981	2006 SD_{102}	—	September 19, 2006	Kitt Peak	Spacewatch	·	880 m	MPC · JPL
849982	2006 SU_{103}	—	September 19, 2006	Kitt Peak	Spacewatch	·	440 m	MPC · JPL
849983	2006 SZ_{111}	—	September 22, 2006	Catalina	CSS	(1547)	1.4 km	MPC · JPL
849984	2006 SS_{114}	—	September 23, 2006	Kitt Peak	Spacewatch	·	850 m	MPC · JPL
849985	2006 SO_{117}	—	September 24, 2006	Kitt Peak	Spacewatch	·	790 m	MPC · JPL
849986	2006 SG_{118}	—	September 18, 2006	Kitt Peak	Spacewatch	GEF	830 m	MPC · JPL
849987	2006 SY_{118}	—	September 23, 2006	Siding Spring	SSS	·	1.4 km	MPC · JPL
849988	2006 SU_{126}	—	September 22, 2006	Bergisch Gladbach	W. Bickel	·	970 m	MPC · JPL
849989	2006 SH_{132}	—	September 16, 2006	Catalina	CSS	·	1.1 km	MPC · JPL
849990	2006 SU_{140}	—	September 22, 2006	Pian dei Termini	A. Boattini, G. Fagioli	·	1.4 km	MPC · JPL
849991	2006 SO_{144}	—	September 19, 2006	Kitt Peak	Spacewatch	·	1.0 km	MPC · JPL
849992	2006 SZ_{148}	—	September 19, 2006	Kitt Peak	Spacewatch	PHO	630 m	MPC · JPL
849993	2006 SZ_{149}	—	September 19, 2006	Kitt Peak	Spacewatch	AGN	960 m	MPC · JPL
849994	2006 SE_{153}	—	September 20, 2006	Socorro	LINEAR	·	1.0 km	MPC · JPL
849995	2006 SF_{153}	—	September 20, 2006	Kitt Peak	Spacewatch	·	1.2 km	MPC · JPL
849996	2006 SH_{159}	—	September 14, 2006	Kitt Peak	Spacewatch	·	1.2 km	MPC · JPL
849997	2006 SN_{160}	—	September 23, 2006	Kitt Peak	Spacewatch	MAS	570 m	MPC · JPL
849998	2006 SG_{162}	—	September 24, 2006	Kitt Peak	Spacewatch	·	450 m	MPC · JPL
849999	2006 SM_{162}	—	September 24, 2006	Kitt Peak	Spacewatch	·	460 m	MPC · JPL
850000	2006 SO_{168}	—	September 17, 2006	Catalina	CSS	·	750 m	MPC · JPL

back to top

== Meaning of names ==
As minor planet discoveries are confirmed, they are given a permanent number by the IAU's Minor Planet Center (MPC), and the discoverers can then submit names for them, following the IAU's naming conventions. The list below concerns those minor planets in the specified number-range that have received names, and explains the meanings of those names.

Official naming citations of newly named small Solar System bodies are approved and published in a bulletin by IAU's Working Group for Small Bodies Nomenclature (WGSBN). Before May 2021, citations were published in MPC's Minor Planet Circulars for many decades. Recent citations can also be found on the JPL Small-Body Database (SBDB). Until his death in 2016, German astronomer Lutz D. Schmadel compiled these citations into the Dictionary of Minor Planet Names (DMP) and regularly updated the collection.

Based on Paul Herget's The Names of the Minor Planets, Schmadel also researched the unclear origin of numerous asteroids, most of which had been named prior to World War II. This article incorporates text from this source, which is in the public domain: SBDB New namings may only be added to this list below after official publication as the preannouncement of names is condemned. The WGSBN publishes a comprehensive guideline for the naming rules of non-cometary small Solar System bodies.

Named minor planet	Provisional	This minor planet was named for...	Ref · Catalog
849224 Motoyama	2005 TQ_{226}	Motoyama, region in Shiojiri, Nagano Prefecture, Japan	IAU · 849224
