= List of minor planets: 735001–736000 =

The following is a partial list of minor planets, running from minor-planet number 735001 through 736000, inclusive. The primary data for this and other partial lists is based on JPL's "Small-Body Orbital Elements" and data available from the Minor Planet Center. Critical list information is also provided by the MPC, unless otherwise specified from Lowell Observatory. A detailed description of the table's columns and additional sources are given on the main page including a complete list of every page in this series, and a statistical break-up on the dynamical classification of minor planets.

Also see the summary list of all named bodies in numerical and alphabetical order, and the corresponding naming citations for the number range of this particular list. New namings may only be added to this list after official publication, as the preannouncement of names is condemned by the Working Group for Small Bodies Nomenclature of the International Astronomical Union.

Near-Earth obj.	MBA (inner)	MBA (outer)	Centaur
Mars-crosser	MBA (middle)	Jupiter trojan	Trans-Neptunian obj.
Unclassified

== 735001–735100 ==
Designation			Discovery			Properties		Ref
Permanent	Provisional	Named after	Date	Site	Discoverer(s)	Category	Diam.	Ref
735001	2015 DQ_{110}	—	October 23, 2013	Kitt Peak	Spacewatch	·	2.5 km	MPC · JPL
735002	2015 DK_{111}	—	October 21, 2008	Mount Lemmon	Mount Lemmon Survey	·	2.2 km	MPC · JPL
735003	2015 DC_{112}	—	January 10, 2010	Mount Lemmon	Mount Lemmon Survey	·	2.0 km	MPC · JPL
735004	2015 DO_{112}	—	January 3, 2009	Kitt Peak	Spacewatch	·	2.8 km	MPC · JPL
735005	2015 DF_{113}	—	December 6, 2010	Mount Lemmon	Mount Lemmon Survey	V	450 m	MPC · JPL
735006	2015 DC_{114}	—	January 23, 2015	Haleakala	Pan-STARRS 1	EOS	1.6 km	MPC · JPL
735007	2015 DL_{114}	—	April 11, 2002	Palomar	NEAT	·	2.5 km	MPC · JPL
735008	2015 DR_{114}	—	January 7, 2009	Kitt Peak	Spacewatch	·	2.6 km	MPC · JPL
735009	2015 DS_{114}	—	September 11, 2007	Kitt Peak	Spacewatch	·	3.2 km	MPC · JPL
735010	2015 DM_{116}	—	January 29, 2015	Haleakala	Pan-STARRS 1	·	2.8 km	MPC · JPL
735011	2015 DZ_{116}	—	January 25, 2015	Haleakala	Pan-STARRS 1	·	960 m	MPC · JPL
735012	2015 DL_{118}	—	September 22, 2009	Mount Lemmon	Mount Lemmon Survey	KON	2.2 km	MPC · JPL
735013	2015 DR_{118}	—	February 17, 2015	Haleakala	Pan-STARRS 1	·	1.4 km	MPC · JPL
735014	2015 DT_{118}	—	January 8, 1999	Kitt Peak	Spacewatch	·	1.9 km	MPC · JPL
735015	2015 DB_{119}	—	February 4, 2009	Mount Lemmon	Mount Lemmon Survey	·	3.2 km	MPC · JPL
735016	2015 DA_{121}	—	January 31, 2009	Mount Lemmon	Mount Lemmon Survey	·	3.6 km	MPC · JPL
735017	2015 DX_{121}	—	April 14, 2004	Kitt Peak	Spacewatch	·	2.5 km	MPC · JPL
735018	2015 DH_{126}	—	November 22, 2008	Kitt Peak	Spacewatch	·	2.2 km	MPC · JPL
735019	2015 DY_{126}	—	February 16, 2010	Mount Lemmon	Mount Lemmon Survey	·	2.5 km	MPC · JPL
735020	2015 DS_{127}	—	December 25, 2005	Kitt Peak	Spacewatch	·	1.5 km	MPC · JPL
735021	2015 DY_{127}	—	January 16, 2010	Kitt Peak	Spacewatch	PHO	1.3 km	MPC · JPL
735022	2015 DB_{128}	—	October 17, 2007	Mount Lemmon	Mount Lemmon Survey	·	2.8 km	MPC · JPL
735023	2015 DO_{128}	—	March 20, 2010	Mount Lemmon	Mount Lemmon Survey	·	2.4 km	MPC · JPL
735024	2015 DF_{129}	—	April 1, 2003	Apache Point	SDSS Collaboration	·	890 m	MPC · JPL
735025	2015 DC_{130}	—	August 17, 2006	Palomar	NEAT	LUT	5.2 km	MPC · JPL
735026	2015 DJ_{131}	—	April 11, 2010	Mount Lemmon	Mount Lemmon Survey	·	3.9 km	MPC · JPL
735027	2015 DG_{132}	—	February 17, 2015	Haleakala	Pan-STARRS 1	MAR	1.0 km	MPC · JPL
735028	2015 DD_{133}	—	December 4, 2007	Mount Lemmon	Mount Lemmon Survey	·	2.7 km	MPC · JPL
735029	2015 DJ_{133}	—	October 17, 2007	Mount Lemmon	Mount Lemmon Survey	·	3.4 km	MPC · JPL
735030	2015 DA_{134}	—	March 23, 2010	WISE	WISE	·	2.5 km	MPC · JPL
735031	2015 DB_{136}	—	December 23, 2012	Haleakala	Pan-STARRS 1	L4	8.3 km	MPC · JPL
735032	2015 DW_{136}	—	April 2, 2011	Westfield	International Astronomical Search Collaboration	MAR	1.1 km	MPC · JPL
735033	2015 DX_{136}	—	March 21, 2010	WISE	WISE	·	2.4 km	MPC · JPL
735034	2015 DJ_{137}	—	October 23, 2008	Kitt Peak	Spacewatch	·	3.5 km	MPC · JPL
735035	2015 DT_{137}	—	December 19, 2007	Mount Lemmon	Mount Lemmon Survey	·	3.3 km	MPC · JPL
735036	2015 DH_{138}	—	March 20, 2010	WISE	WISE	·	3.0 km	MPC · JPL
735037	2015 DM_{138}	—	May 15, 2008	Catalina	CSS	PHO	1.0 km	MPC · JPL
735038	2015 DP_{138}	—	July 18, 2005	Palomar	NEAT	·	4.2 km	MPC · JPL
735039	2015 DO_{140}	—	March 19, 2010	Mount Lemmon	Mount Lemmon Survey	·	2.5 km	MPC · JPL
735040	2015 DA_{141}	—	May 18, 2010	WISE	WISE	·	3.6 km	MPC · JPL
735041	2015 DR_{141}	—	February 18, 2015	Haleakala	Pan-STARRS 1	·	2.5 km	MPC · JPL
735042	2015 DP_{142}	—	November 23, 2009	Mount Lemmon	Mount Lemmon Survey	·	2.1 km	MPC · JPL
735043	2015 DO_{152}	—	January 21, 2015	Haleakala	Pan-STARRS 1	·	830 m	MPC · JPL
735044	2015 DL_{157}	—	February 13, 2010	Catalina	CSS	·	3.6 km	MPC · JPL
735045	2015 DB_{159}	—	April 1, 2003	Apache Point	SDSS Collaboration	·	2.1 km	MPC · JPL
735046	2015 DP_{162}	—	February 18, 2015	Haleakala	Pan-STARRS 1	·	990 m	MPC · JPL
735047	2015 DG_{164}	—	September 4, 2008	Kitt Peak	Spacewatch	·	2.2 km	MPC · JPL
735048	2015 DA_{165}	—	February 14, 2010	Kitt Peak	Spacewatch	·	2.3 km	MPC · JPL
735049	2015 DB_{165}	—	February 11, 2011	Mount Lemmon	Mount Lemmon Survey	·	910 m	MPC · JPL
735050	2015 DL_{165}	—	January 8, 2002	Apache Point	SDSS	·	3.4 km	MPC · JPL
735051	2015 DY_{165}	—	September 22, 2009	Mount Lemmon	Mount Lemmon Survey	·	600 m	MPC · JPL
735052	2015 DJ_{167}	—	October 2, 2013	Mount Lemmon	Mount Lemmon Survey	·	860 m	MPC · JPL
735053	2015 DK_{171}	—	November 10, 2013	Mount Lemmon	Mount Lemmon Survey	·	3.0 km	MPC · JPL
735054	2015 DP_{171}	—	March 31, 2008	Mount Lemmon	Mount Lemmon Survey	PHO	710 m	MPC · JPL
735055	2015 DM_{172}	—	April 9, 2010	Mount Lemmon	Mount Lemmon Survey	·	2.9 km	MPC · JPL
735056	2015 DQ_{172}	—	September 13, 2007	Kitt Peak	Spacewatch	·	3.3 km	MPC · JPL
735057	2015 DF_{177}	—	September 30, 2005	Mauna Kea	A. Boattini	HOF	2.7 km	MPC · JPL
735058	2015 DT_{177}	—	May 24, 2010	WISE	WISE	·	3.2 km	MPC · JPL
735059	2015 DU_{177}	—	February 5, 2010	WISE	WISE	·	1.9 km	MPC · JPL
735060	2015 DE_{181}	—	October 4, 2013	Mount Lemmon	Mount Lemmon Survey	·	620 m	MPC · JPL
735061	2015 DJ_{181}	—	November 10, 2013	Mount Lemmon	Mount Lemmon Survey	·	1.2 km	MPC · JPL
735062	2015 DR_{185}	—	April 26, 2011	Mount Lemmon	Mount Lemmon Survey	·	1.6 km	MPC · JPL
735063	2015 DD_{187}	—	March 4, 2010	WISE	WISE	·	1.6 km	MPC · JPL
735064	2015 DL_{187}	—	September 21, 2009	Mount Lemmon	Mount Lemmon Survey	·	1.0 km	MPC · JPL
735065	2015 DK_{192}	—	January 27, 2015	Haleakala	Pan-STARRS 1	·	1.8 km	MPC · JPL
735066	2015 DN_{193}	—	November 2, 2013	Mount Lemmon	Mount Lemmon Survey	·	2.6 km	MPC · JPL
735067	2015 DG_{194}	—	January 11, 2015	Haleakala	Pan-STARRS 1	·	1.9 km	MPC · JPL
735068	2015 DK_{194}	—	September 9, 2007	Kitt Peak	Spacewatch	·	2.8 km	MPC · JPL
735069	2015 DP_{194}	—	June 16, 2005	Mount Lemmon	Mount Lemmon Survey	·	3.5 km	MPC · JPL
735070	2015 DH_{195}	—	January 13, 2015	Haleakala	Pan-STARRS 1	·	2.3 km	MPC · JPL
735071	2015 DE_{196}	—	May 9, 2010	WISE	WISE	·	1.6 km	MPC · JPL
735072	2015 DB_{197}	—	February 4, 2002	Palomar	NEAT	·	2.0 km	MPC · JPL
735073	2015 DH_{197}	—	March 15, 2010	WISE	WISE	·	1.7 km	MPC · JPL
735074	2015 DW_{202}	—	October 18, 2007	Kitt Peak	Spacewatch	EOS	1.8 km	MPC · JPL
735075	2015 DD_{205}	—	April 29, 2008	Kitt Peak	Spacewatch	·	800 m	MPC · JPL
735076	2015 DB_{207}	—	March 16, 2005	Mount Lemmon	Mount Lemmon Survey	DOR	3.1 km	MPC · JPL
735077	2015 DA_{208}	—	March 26, 2003	Apache Point	SDSS Collaboration	T_{j} (2.99)	3.7 km	MPC · JPL
735078	2015 DQ_{209}	—	July 8, 2005	Kitt Peak	Spacewatch	·	2.9 km	MPC · JPL
735079	2015 DQ_{212}	—	October 25, 2012	Mount Lemmon	Mount Lemmon Survey	·	1.5 km	MPC · JPL
735080	2015 DL_{217}	—	January 15, 2008	Mount Lemmon	Mount Lemmon Survey	·	560 m	MPC · JPL
735081	2015 DF_{219}	—	February 24, 2010	WISE	WISE	EUP	3.3 km	MPC · JPL
735082	2015 DQ_{219}	—	November 8, 2008	Kitt Peak	Spacewatch	·	1.9 km	MPC · JPL
735083	2015 DS_{219}	—	October 25, 2008	Kitt Peak	Spacewatch	HOF	2.8 km	MPC · JPL
735084	2015 DK_{220}	—	August 18, 2006	Kitt Peak	Spacewatch	·	2.9 km	MPC · JPL
735085	2015 DA_{222}	—	October 10, 2002	Apache Point	SDSS Collaboration	MAS	670 m	MPC · JPL
735086	2015 DF_{223}	—	January 20, 2015	Haleakala	Pan-STARRS 1	·	1.4 km	MPC · JPL
735087	2015 DE_{224}	—	June 21, 2010	WISE	WISE	·	2.7 km	MPC · JPL
735088	2015 DH_{226}	—	January 25, 2012	Haleakala	Pan-STARRS 1	H	560 m	MPC · JPL
735089	2015 DQ_{228}	—	December 28, 2013	La Silla	La Silla	(5)	850 m	MPC · JPL
735090	2015 DM_{229}	—	October 15, 2001	Palomar	NEAT	·	4.6 km	MPC · JPL
735091	2015 DK_{230}	—	February 16, 2015	Haleakala	Pan-STARRS 1	·	2.1 km	MPC · JPL
735092	2015 DG_{231}	—	February 16, 2015	Haleakala	Pan-STARRS 1	·	2.1 km	MPC · JPL
735093	2015 DQ_{233}	—	January 2, 2009	Mount Lemmon	Mount Lemmon Survey	·	1.8 km	MPC · JPL
735094	2015 DU_{234}	—	February 12, 2002	Kitt Peak	Spacewatch	·	930 m	MPC · JPL
735095	2015 DC_{235}	—	September 28, 2008	Mount Lemmon	Mount Lemmon Survey	·	1.7 km	MPC · JPL
735096	2015 DV_{238}	—	February 16, 2015	Haleakala	Pan-STARRS 1	·	1.4 km	MPC · JPL
735097	2015 DK_{242}	—	February 18, 2015	Haleakala	Pan-STARRS 1	·	570 m	MPC · JPL
735098	2015 DS_{242}	—	January 22, 2015	Haleakala	Pan-STARRS 1	·	1.1 km	MPC · JPL
735099	2015 DT_{244}	—	October 15, 2001	Apache Point	SDSS Collaboration	·	1.1 km	MPC · JPL
735100	2015 DV_{244}	—	December 13, 2010	Mount Lemmon	Mount Lemmon Survey	V	480 m	MPC · JPL

== 735101–735200 ==
back to top

Designation			Discovery			Properties		Ref
Permanent	Provisional	Named after	Date	Site	Discoverer(s)	Category	Diam.	Ref
735101	2015 DD_{245}	—	February 23, 2015	Haleakala	Pan-STARRS 1	·	820 m	MPC · JPL
735102	2015 DH_{247}	—	September 27, 2003	Kitt Peak	Spacewatch	·	1.8 km	MPC · JPL
735103	2015 DQ_{264}	—	February 17, 2015	Haleakala	Pan-STARRS 1	·	2.3 km	MPC · JPL
735104	2015 DW_{264}	—	February 16, 2015	Haleakala	Pan-STARRS 1	·	590 m	MPC · JPL
735105	2015 DD_{265}	—	February 19, 2015	Haleakala	Pan-STARRS 1	·	1.4 km	MPC · JPL
735106	2015 DY_{270}	—	February 16, 2015	Haleakala	Pan-STARRS 1	·	750 m	MPC · JPL
735107	2015 DN_{272}	—	February 16, 2015	Haleakala	Pan-STARRS 1	·	910 m	MPC · JPL
735108	2015 DK_{279}	—	February 17, 2015	Haleakala	Pan-STARRS 1	L4	7.8 km	MPC · JPL
735109	2015 DH_{284}	—	January 22, 2015	Haleakala	Pan-STARRS 1	·	2.4 km	MPC · JPL
735110	2015 DR_{286}	—	February 17, 2015	Haleakala	Pan-STARRS 1	·	2.6 km	MPC · JPL
735111	2015 DE_{292}	—	February 27, 2015	Haleakala	Pan-STARRS 1	·	820 m	MPC · JPL
735112	2015 ED_{1}	—	June 17, 2010	WISE	WISE	ARM	3.0 km	MPC · JPL
735113	2015 EL_{1}	—	October 24, 2009	Mount Lemmon	Mount Lemmon Survey	PHO	1.1 km	MPC · JPL
735114	2015 EB_{5}	—	March 12, 2010	Kitt Peak	Spacewatch	·	2.4 km	MPC · JPL
735115	2015 EF_{8}	—	April 24, 2010	WISE	WISE	·	2.2 km	MPC · JPL
735116	2015 EV_{8}	—	January 15, 2010	WISE	WISE	·	1.0 km	MPC · JPL
735117	2015 ED_{10}	—	October 20, 2003	Kitt Peak	Spacewatch	·	2.5 km	MPC · JPL
735118	2015 EK_{10}	—	August 30, 2002	Palomar	NEAT	·	3.0 km	MPC · JPL
735119	2015 ED_{11}	—	February 9, 2010	WISE	WISE	·	1.2 km	MPC · JPL
735120	2015 ER_{11}	—	February 16, 2010	Mount Lemmon	Mount Lemmon Survey	·	3.3 km	MPC · JPL
735121	2015 EX_{11}	—	June 14, 2010	WISE	WISE	·	2.9 km	MPC · JPL
735122	2015 EH_{12}	—	January 23, 2015	Haleakala	Pan-STARRS 1	·	730 m	MPC · JPL
735123	2015 EO_{13}	—	April 25, 2007	Kitt Peak	Spacewatch	·	2.2 km	MPC · JPL
735124	2015 EH_{14}	—	February 18, 2010	Mount Lemmon	Mount Lemmon Survey	·	2.7 km	MPC · JPL
735125	2015 EQ_{14}	—	February 28, 2008	Kitt Peak	Spacewatch	·	860 m	MPC · JPL
735126	2015 EO_{16}	—	November 9, 2013	Kitt Peak	Spacewatch	·	2.6 km	MPC · JPL
735127	2015 EQ_{17}	—	October 2, 2003	Kitt Peak	Spacewatch	·	2.7 km	MPC · JPL
735128	2015 EO_{18}	—	March 10, 2008	Mount Lemmon	Mount Lemmon Survey	·	1.2 km	MPC · JPL
735129	2015 EX_{18}	—	April 20, 2010	Mount Lemmon	Mount Lemmon Survey	·	3.1 km	MPC · JPL
735130	2015 EU_{19}	—	October 3, 2013	Kitt Peak	Spacewatch	·	1.3 km	MPC · JPL
735131	2015 EW_{19}	—	December 13, 2010	Mount Lemmon	Mount Lemmon Survey	·	990 m	MPC · JPL
735132	2015 EY_{20}	—	January 16, 2015	Haleakala	Pan-STARRS 1	·	2.6 km	MPC · JPL
735133	2015 EM_{21}	—	April 2, 2009	Kitt Peak	Spacewatch	·	620 m	MPC · JPL
735134	2015 EQ_{23}	—	January 24, 2015	Mount Lemmon	Mount Lemmon Survey	·	990 m	MPC · JPL
735135	2015 EH_{24}	—	January 19, 2015	Kitt Peak	Spacewatch	·	920 m	MPC · JPL
735136	2015 EE_{25}	—	July 8, 2010	WISE	WISE	·	2.7 km	MPC · JPL
735137	2015 ER_{25}	—	August 14, 2012	Haleakala	Pan-STARRS 1	·	2.8 km	MPC · JPL
735138	2015 EG_{28}	—	October 6, 2005	Mount Lemmon	Mount Lemmon Survey	·	740 m	MPC · JPL
735139	2015 EZ_{28}	—	November 4, 2007	Mount Lemmon	Mount Lemmon Survey	·	2.1 km	MPC · JPL
735140	2015 ED_{30}	—	June 12, 2010	WISE	WISE	·	2.4 km	MPC · JPL
735141	2015 EL_{30}	—	October 17, 2001	Palomar	NEAT	·	3.5 km	MPC · JPL
735142	2015 EA_{34}	—	July 27, 2011	Haleakala	Pan-STARRS 1	·	2.6 km	MPC · JPL
735143	2015 EO_{34}	—	December 20, 2007	Kitt Peak	Spacewatch	·	510 m	MPC · JPL
735144	2015 EM_{37}	—	October 22, 2006	Kitt Peak	Spacewatch	·	630 m	MPC · JPL
735145	2015 ER_{39}	—	October 29, 2005	Mount Lemmon	Mount Lemmon Survey	NYS	1.1 km	MPC · JPL
735146	2015 EK_{40}	—	January 31, 2010	WISE	WISE	·	4.4 km	MPC · JPL
735147	2015 EQ_{45}	—	October 20, 2003	Kitt Peak	Spacewatch	·	530 m	MPC · JPL
735148	2015 ER_{45}	—	August 17, 2006	Palomar	NEAT	·	5.3 km	MPC · JPL
735149	2015 EK_{48}	—	February 24, 2015	Haleakala	Pan-STARRS 1	·	930 m	MPC · JPL
735150	2015 EC_{50}	—	December 30, 2008	Mount Lemmon	Mount Lemmon Survey	·	2.1 km	MPC · JPL
735151	2015 EM_{51}	—	January 23, 2010	WISE	WISE	T_{j} (2.99)	3.1 km	MPC · JPL
735152	2015 ER_{52}	—	January 23, 2015	Haleakala	Pan-STARRS 1	(883)	620 m	MPC · JPL
735153	2015 EE_{54}	—	May 4, 2005	Mauna Kea	Veillet, C.	EMA	2.6 km	MPC · JPL
735154	2015 ER_{55}	—	September 17, 2006	Kitt Peak	Spacewatch	·	650 m	MPC · JPL
735155	2015 EN_{58}	—	December 29, 2014	Haleakala	Pan-STARRS 1	·	1.4 km	MPC · JPL
735156	2015 EY_{60}	—	February 18, 2010	WISE	WISE	PHO	1.2 km	MPC · JPL
735157	2015 EH_{63}	—	March 25, 2006	Palomar	NEAT	·	2.7 km	MPC · JPL
735158	2015 ER_{65}	—	February 21, 2012	Kitt Peak	Spacewatch	·	570 m	MPC · JPL
735159	2015 EO_{66}	—	March 4, 2006	Mount Lemmon	Mount Lemmon Survey	·	1.7 km	MPC · JPL
735160	2015 ET_{66}	—	March 12, 2005	Kitt Peak	Deep Ecliptic Survey	·	1.8 km	MPC · JPL
735161	2015 EA_{67}	—	October 14, 2013	Mount Lemmon	Mount Lemmon Survey	·	2.8 km	MPC · JPL
735162	2015 EG_{68}	—	March 15, 2010	Mount Lemmon	Mount Lemmon Survey	·	1.7 km	MPC · JPL
735163	2015 EP_{71}	—	February 8, 2011	Mount Lemmon	Mount Lemmon Survey	·	1.1 km	MPC · JPL
735164	2015 EM_{74}	—	January 17, 2009	Mount Lemmon	Mount Lemmon Survey	·	2.5 km	MPC · JPL
735165	2015 EY_{74}	—	April 27, 2004	Socorro	LINEAR	T_{j} (2.97)	3.5 km	MPC · JPL
735166	2015 EO_{75}	—	January 21, 2015	Haleakala	Pan-STARRS 1	·	2.9 km	MPC · JPL
735167	2015 FM_{1}	—	May 30, 2010	WISE	WISE	EOS	2.0 km	MPC · JPL
735168	2015 FX_{1}	—	March 19, 2010	Mount Lemmon	Mount Lemmon Survey	·	2.6 km	MPC · JPL
735169	2015 FB_{3}	—	November 26, 2009	Mount Lemmon	Mount Lemmon Survey	·	2.4 km	MPC · JPL
735170	2015 FT_{3}	—	December 26, 2014	Haleakala	Pan-STARRS 1	(1118)	2.8 km	MPC · JPL
735171	2015 FY_{3}	—	April 21, 2012	Mount Lemmon	Mount Lemmon Survey	·	3.0 km	MPC · JPL
735172	2015 FC_{4}	—	May 12, 2010	WISE	WISE	·	3.4 km	MPC · JPL
735173	2015 FR_{4}	—	July 14, 2013	Haleakala	Pan-STARRS 1	·	3.2 km	MPC · JPL
735174	2015 FW_{5}	—	May 17, 2010	WISE	WISE	·	2.8 km	MPC · JPL
735175	2015 FF_{7}	—	February 11, 2004	Kitt Peak	Spacewatch	·	4.9 km	MPC · JPL
735176	2015 FO_{7}	—	January 19, 2015	Kitt Peak	Spacewatch	·	2.6 km	MPC · JPL
735177 Dinev	2015 FM_{10}	Dinev	March 1, 2015	La Palma	EURONEAR	·	2.2 km	MPC · JPL
735178	2015 FP_{10}	—	December 6, 2013	Haleakala	Pan-STARRS 1	·	1.3 km	MPC · JPL
735179	2015 FE_{12}	—	February 4, 2009	Mount Lemmon	Mount Lemmon Survey	VER	2.2 km	MPC · JPL
735180	2015 FW_{18}	—	March 25, 2007	Mount Lemmon	Mount Lemmon Survey	·	780 m	MPC · JPL
735181	2015 FF_{19}	—	September 19, 2001	Apache Point	SDSS Collaboration	·	3.1 km	MPC · JPL
735182	2015 FJ_{19}	—	April 10, 2010	WISE	WISE	THB	2.9 km	MPC · JPL
735183	2015 FN_{19}	—	January 16, 2004	Palomar	NEAT	·	940 m	MPC · JPL
735184	2015 FN_{20}	—	December 20, 2009	Kitt Peak	Spacewatch	EUN	980 m	MPC · JPL
735185	2015 FS_{20}	—	February 11, 2010	WISE	WISE	·	2.2 km	MPC · JPL
735186	2015 FA_{22}	—	March 16, 2015	Haleakala	Pan-STARRS 1	·	1.4 km	MPC · JPL
735187	2015 FR_{24}	—	November 27, 2013	Haleakala	Pan-STARRS 1	·	1.4 km	MPC · JPL
735188	2015 FK_{25}	—	June 15, 2010	WISE	WISE	·	2.6 km	MPC · JPL
735189	2015 FM_{25}	—	September 27, 2008	Mount Lemmon	Mount Lemmon Survey	·	1.6 km	MPC · JPL
735190	2015 FL_{27}	—	April 13, 2010	Mount Lemmon	Mount Lemmon Survey	·	3.5 km	MPC · JPL
735191	2015 FB_{28}	—	April 9, 2010	Mount Lemmon	Mount Lemmon Survey	·	2.8 km	MPC · JPL
735192	2015 FD_{40}	—	October 7, 2004	Kitt Peak	Spacewatch	·	980 m	MPC · JPL
735193	2015 FS_{41}	—	October 22, 1995	Kitt Peak	Spacewatch	·	3.4 km	MPC · JPL
735194	2015 FS_{43}	—	April 25, 2003	Kitt Peak	Spacewatch	·	780 m	MPC · JPL
735195	2015 FH_{45}	—	May 10, 2002	Palomar	NEAT	·	1.5 km	MPC · JPL
735196	2015 FD_{47}	—	June 9, 2010	WISE	WISE	EOS	1.5 km	MPC · JPL
735197	2015 FW_{47}	—	September 26, 2006	Mount Lemmon	Mount Lemmon Survey	·	940 m	MPC · JPL
735198	2015 FF_{49}	—	August 26, 2012	Haleakala	Pan-STARRS 1	·	2.3 km	MPC · JPL
735199	2015 FZ_{49}	—	September 19, 2007	Kitt Peak	Spacewatch	·	2.5 km	MPC · JPL
735200	2015 FM_{50}	—	September 28, 1997	Kitt Peak	Spacewatch	·	1.6 km	MPC · JPL

== 735201–735300 ==
back to top

Designation			Discovery			Properties		Ref
Permanent	Provisional	Named after	Date	Site	Discoverer(s)	Category	Diam.	Ref
735201	2015 FS_{50}	—	January 18, 2015	Haleakala	Pan-STARRS 1	ELF	3.5 km	MPC · JPL
735202	2015 FW_{51}	—	January 18, 2015	Haleakala	Pan-STARRS 1	·	2.2 km	MPC · JPL
735203	2015 FR_{53}	—	April 3, 2010	WISE	WISE	TRE	2.3 km	MPC · JPL
735204	2015 FU_{53}	—	February 19, 2010	Kitt Peak	Spacewatch	·	3.1 km	MPC · JPL
735205	2015 FN_{55}	—	January 3, 2009	Kitt Peak	Spacewatch	·	2.9 km	MPC · JPL
735206	2015 FY_{55}	—	January 19, 2015	Haleakala	Pan-STARRS 1	·	2.5 km	MPC · JPL
735207	2015 FS_{56}	—	June 8, 2010	WISE	WISE	·	2.4 km	MPC · JPL
735208	2015 FJ_{58}	—	July 21, 2006	Catalina	CSS	·	2.9 km	MPC · JPL
735209	2015 FU_{60}	—	December 3, 2013	Haleakala	Pan-STARRS 1	·	2.7 km	MPC · JPL
735210	2015 FA_{63}	—	March 18, 2015	Haleakala	Pan-STARRS 1	H	410 m	MPC · JPL
735211	2015 FQ_{65}	—	November 20, 2007	Kitt Peak	Spacewatch	ELF	4.1 km	MPC · JPL
735212	2015 FM_{68}	—	December 17, 2009	Kitt Peak	Spacewatch	·	1.7 km	MPC · JPL
735213	2015 FA_{69}	—	March 25, 2007	Mount Lemmon	Mount Lemmon Survey	·	950 m	MPC · JPL
735214	2015 FQ_{71}	—	August 30, 2005	Kitt Peak	Spacewatch	·	880 m	MPC · JPL
735215	2015 FH_{75}	—	September 27, 2003	Kitt Peak	Spacewatch	·	1.5 km	MPC · JPL
735216	2015 FM_{75}	—	April 9, 2002	Kitt Peak	Spacewatch	·	3.3 km	MPC · JPL
735217	2015 FS_{78}	—	November 19, 2003	Kitt Peak	Spacewatch	HOF	3.1 km	MPC · JPL
735218	2015 FZ_{80}	—	January 8, 2010	WISE	WISE	·	3.1 km	MPC · JPL
735219	2015 FD_{81}	—	October 23, 2006	Kitt Peak	Spacewatch	·	940 m	MPC · JPL
735220	2015 FF_{81}	—	March 20, 2015	Haleakala	Pan-STARRS 1	·	2.4 km	MPC · JPL
735221	2015 FH_{83}	—	November 22, 2008	Kitt Peak	Spacewatch	·	3.0 km	MPC · JPL
735222	2015 FJ_{86}	—	March 20, 2015	Haleakala	Pan-STARRS 1	·	1.2 km	MPC · JPL
735223	2015 FM_{86}	—	July 21, 2010	WISE	WISE	TIR	2.3 km	MPC · JPL
735224	2015 FZ_{91}	—	May 10, 2002	Palomar	NEAT	·	1.0 km	MPC · JPL
735225	2015 FY_{93}	—	September 26, 2008	Mount Lemmon	Mount Lemmon Survey	·	1.6 km	MPC · JPL
735226	2015 FS_{96}	—	February 11, 2010	WISE	WISE	·	2.0 km	MPC · JPL
735227	2015 FL_{99}	—	October 30, 2013	Haleakala	Pan-STARRS 1	·	890 m	MPC · JPL
735228	2015 FH_{101}	—	November 29, 2013	Mount Lemmon	Mount Lemmon Survey	·	1.3 km	MPC · JPL
735229	2015 FR_{101}	—	January 22, 2015	Haleakala	Pan-STARRS 1	·	920 m	MPC · JPL
735230	2015 FL_{104}	—	January 10, 2010	Kitt Peak	Spacewatch	·	1.9 km	MPC · JPL
735231	2015 FA_{111}	—	September 1, 2005	Kitt Peak	Spacewatch	·	870 m	MPC · JPL
735232	2015 FR_{113}	—	May 14, 2012	Haleakala	Pan-STARRS 1	·	550 m	MPC · JPL
735233	2015 FN_{114}	—	June 25, 2010	WISE	WISE	TRE	3.0 km	MPC · JPL
735234	2015 FX_{118}	—	January 17, 2001	Haleakala	NEAT	·	1.7 km	MPC · JPL
735235	2015 FY_{118}	—	February 16, 2004	Catalina	CSS	TIR	2.5 km	MPC · JPL
735236	2015 FK_{119}	—	January 26, 2010	WISE	WISE	·	2.8 km	MPC · JPL
735237	2015 FP_{119}	—	March 23, 2004	Socorro	LINEAR	·	2.9 km	MPC · JPL
735238	2015 FQ_{120}	—	February 27, 2009	Mount Lemmon	Mount Lemmon Survey	·	4.6 km	MPC · JPL
735239	2015 FF_{121}	—	March 2, 2006	Mount Lemmon	Mount Lemmon Survey	·	1.6 km	MPC · JPL
735240	2015 FS_{122}	—	January 8, 2010	Kitt Peak	Spacewatch	·	2.6 km	MPC · JPL
735241	2015 FF_{125}	—	May 28, 2010	WISE	WISE	·	2.5 km	MPC · JPL
735242	2015 FS_{125}	—	October 3, 2013	Haleakala	Pan-STARRS 1	·	1.7 km	MPC · JPL
735243	2015 FE_{127}	—	January 15, 2015	Haleakala	Pan-STARRS 1	·	2.2 km	MPC · JPL
735244	2015 FW_{127}	—	April 30, 2010	WISE	WISE	·	1.7 km	MPC · JPL
735245	2015 FK_{128}	—	March 12, 2010	Siding Spring	SSS	·	3.9 km	MPC · JPL
735246	2015 FR_{128}	—	June 28, 2010	WISE	WISE	·	2.7 km	MPC · JPL
735247	2015 FY_{129}	—	May 31, 2010	WISE	WISE	·	2.7 km	MPC · JPL
735248	2015 FE_{131}	—	May 13, 2010	Mount Lemmon	Mount Lemmon Survey	(1118)	3.5 km	MPC · JPL
735249	2015 FK_{131}	—	June 11, 2010	WISE	WISE	·	3.5 km	MPC · JPL
735250	2015 FJ_{132}	—	April 10, 2010	Catalina	CSS	·	3.5 km	MPC · JPL
735251	2015 FV_{132}	—	January 12, 2010	WISE	WISE	·	3.8 km	MPC · JPL
735252	2015 FZ_{133}	—	January 25, 2015	Haleakala	Pan-STARRS 1	·	560 m	MPC · JPL
735253	2015 FC_{135}	—	September 21, 2008	Kitt Peak	Spacewatch	·	810 m	MPC · JPL
735254	2015 FT_{135}	—	March 21, 2015	Mount Lemmon	Mount Lemmon Survey	·	2.2 km	MPC · JPL
735255	2015 FZ_{135}	—	November 15, 2013	Calar Alto-CASADO	Proffe, G., Hellmich, S.	·	3.1 km	MPC · JPL
735256	2015 FA_{138}	—	November 20, 2003	Apache Point	SDSS Collaboration	·	1.7 km	MPC · JPL
735257	2015 FG_{140}	—	March 16, 2015	Kitt Peak	Spacewatch	·	930 m	MPC · JPL
735258	2015 FY_{141}	—	September 4, 2002	Palomar	NEAT	·	2.0 km	MPC · JPL
735259	2015 FD_{142}	—	March 17, 2010	WISE	WISE	·	2.9 km	MPC · JPL
735260	2015 FT_{142}	—	March 21, 2010	WISE	WISE	KON	2.0 km	MPC · JPL
735261	2015 FD_{143}	—	March 17, 2015	Mount Lemmon	Mount Lemmon Survey	·	760 m	MPC · JPL
735262	2015 FJ_{143}	—	June 10, 2012	Mount Lemmon	Mount Lemmon Survey	·	460 m	MPC · JPL
735263	2015 FS_{144}	—	March 21, 2015	Haleakala	Pan-STARRS 1	·	1 km	MPC · JPL
735264	2015 FW_{145}	—	October 11, 2005	Kitt Peak	Spacewatch	·	1.0 km	MPC · JPL
735265	2015 FV_{146}	—	September 26, 2003	Apache Point	SDSS Collaboration	AGN	1.2 km	MPC · JPL
735266	2015 FV_{147}	—	October 18, 2012	Haleakala	Pan-STARRS 1	·	1.8 km	MPC · JPL
735267	2015 FN_{149}	—	April 20, 2007	Mount Lemmon	Mount Lemmon Survey	·	680 m	MPC · JPL
735268	2015 FM_{150}	—	October 27, 2008	Mount Lemmon	Mount Lemmon Survey	·	870 m	MPC · JPL
735269	2015 FH_{154}	—	February 9, 2005	Kitt Peak	Spacewatch	·	600 m	MPC · JPL
735270	2015 FZ_{154}	—	August 19, 2001	Cerro Tololo	Deep Ecliptic Survey	NYS	890 m	MPC · JPL
735271	2015 FP_{155}	—	May 17, 2010	WISE	WISE	·	4.1 km	MPC · JPL
735272	2015 FE_{158}	—	September 19, 1998	Apache Point	SDSS Collaboration	·	1.0 km	MPC · JPL
735273	2015 FY_{160}	—	March 17, 2015	Kitt Peak	Spacewatch	·	990 m	MPC · JPL
735274	2015 FD_{169}	—	September 17, 2001	Kitt Peak	Spacewatch	EOS	2.7 km	MPC · JPL
735275	2015 FX_{170}	—	March 21, 2015	Haleakala	Pan-STARRS 1	·	890 m	MPC · JPL
735276	2015 FP_{172}	—	March 21, 2015	Haleakala	Pan-STARRS 1	·	1.4 km	MPC · JPL
735277	2015 FA_{173}	—	April 11, 2007	Mount Lemmon	Mount Lemmon Survey	·	930 m	MPC · JPL
735278	2015 FK_{175}	—	September 26, 2003	Apache Point	SDSS Collaboration	·	2.1 km	MPC · JPL
735279	2015 FT_{176}	—	September 18, 2007	Mount Lemmon	Mount Lemmon Survey	·	3.3 km	MPC · JPL
735280	2015 FE_{177}	—	November 17, 2001	Kitt Peak	Spacewatch	·	2.8 km	MPC · JPL
735281	2015 FA_{178}	—	October 10, 2002	Apache Point	SDSS Collaboration	·	1.6 km	MPC · JPL
735282	2015 FB_{178}	—	January 17, 2004	Palomar	NEAT	·	3.0 km	MPC · JPL
735283	2015 FJ_{178}	—	October 30, 2013	Haleakala	Pan-STARRS 1	V	540 m	MPC · JPL
735284	2015 FT_{178}	—	April 13, 2002	Palomar	NEAT	ADE	2.1 km	MPC · JPL
735285	2015 FK_{183}	—	June 28, 2010	WISE	WISE	3:2	5.9 km	MPC · JPL
735286	2015 FH_{184}	—	March 15, 2010	Mount Lemmon	Mount Lemmon Survey	·	2.0 km	MPC · JPL
735287	2015 FN_{185}	—	November 19, 2008	Kitt Peak	Spacewatch	·	3.0 km	MPC · JPL
735288	2015 FB_{186}	—	July 7, 2010	WISE	WISE	·	3.2 km	MPC · JPL
735289	2015 FE_{188}	—	January 18, 2015	Haleakala	Pan-STARRS 1	·	1.7 km	MPC · JPL
735290	2015 FE_{190}	—	March 22, 2015	Haleakala	Pan-STARRS 1	·	2.6 km	MPC · JPL
735291	2015 FA_{195}	—	February 7, 2010	WISE	WISE	·	3.0 km	MPC · JPL
735292	2015 FS_{195}	—	May 3, 2008	Kitt Peak	Spacewatch	V	460 m	MPC · JPL
735293	2015 FT_{196}	—	June 14, 2010	WISE	WISE	·	1.8 km	MPC · JPL
735294	2015 FL_{198}	—	November 17, 2009	Kitt Peak	Spacewatch	·	970 m	MPC · JPL
735295	2015 FP_{201}	—	February 11, 2015	Mount Lemmon	Mount Lemmon Survey	·	700 m	MPC · JPL
735296	2015 FP_{202}	—	May 7, 2005	Kitt Peak	Spacewatch	·	500 m	MPC · JPL
735297	2015 FS_{203}	—	January 27, 2011	Kitt Peak	Spacewatch	·	990 m	MPC · JPL
735298	2015 FH_{208}	—	December 31, 2007	Kitt Peak	Spacewatch	·	530 m	MPC · JPL
735299	2015 FB_{212}	—	February 17, 2010	Catalina	CSS	·	1.4 km	MPC · JPL
735300	2015 FH_{212}	—	March 22, 2015	Haleakala	Pan-STARRS 1	PHO	740 m	MPC · JPL

== 735301–735400 ==
back to top

Designation			Discovery			Properties		Ref
Permanent	Provisional	Named after	Date	Site	Discoverer(s)	Category	Diam.	Ref
735301	2015 FC_{214}	—	July 22, 2001	Palomar	NEAT	·	2.7 km	MPC · JPL
735302	2015 FK_{214}	—	March 2, 2010	WISE	WISE	·	3.2 km	MPC · JPL
735303	2015 FQ_{214}	—	January 12, 2010	Catalina	CSS	ADE	2.0 km	MPC · JPL
735304	2015 FV_{214}	—	October 22, 2006	Mount Lemmon	Mount Lemmon Survey	·	2.6 km	MPC · JPL
735305	2015 FA_{215}	—	October 23, 2013	Mount Lemmon	Mount Lemmon Survey	·	960 m	MPC · JPL
735306	2015 FV_{219}	—	October 1, 2006	Kitt Peak	Spacewatch	·	2.0 km	MPC · JPL
735307	2015 FY_{222}	—	March 19, 2009	Kitt Peak	Spacewatch	·	3.3 km	MPC · JPL
735308	2015 FA_{223}	—	January 23, 2006	Kitt Peak	Spacewatch	·	1.2 km	MPC · JPL
735309	2015 FN_{226}	—	January 10, 2007	Kitt Peak	Spacewatch	NYS	1.1 km	MPC · JPL
735310	2015 FK_{227}	—	February 16, 2015	Haleakala	Pan-STARRS 1	·	970 m	MPC · JPL
735311	2015 FP_{227}	—	September 17, 2012	Kitt Peak	Spacewatch	·	2.1 km	MPC · JPL
735312	2015 FC_{238}	—	January 27, 2010	WISE	WISE	·	2.3 km	MPC · JPL
735313	2015 FD_{238}	—	January 23, 2015	Haleakala	Pan-STARRS 1	·	3.0 km	MPC · JPL
735314	2015 FW_{238}	—	January 18, 2009	Mount Lemmon	Mount Lemmon Survey	EMA	3.5 km	MPC · JPL
735315	2015 FT_{240}	—	April 24, 2003	Kitt Peak	Spacewatch	·	820 m	MPC · JPL
735316	2015 FO_{242}	—	January 28, 2010	WISE	WISE	·	2.4 km	MPC · JPL
735317	2015 FA_{245}	—	December 12, 2013	Haleakala	Pan-STARRS 1	·	1.9 km	MPC · JPL
735318	2015 FB_{246}	—	April 3, 2008	Kitt Peak	Spacewatch	·	830 m	MPC · JPL
735319	2015 FM_{246}	—	September 6, 2013	Mount Lemmon	Mount Lemmon Survey	·	960 m	MPC · JPL
735320	2015 FR_{246}	—	October 4, 2006	Mount Lemmon	Mount Lemmon Survey	·	3.7 km	MPC · JPL
735321	2015 FQ_{247}	—	January 19, 2009	Mount Lemmon	Mount Lemmon Survey	(1298)	2.6 km	MPC · JPL
735322	2015 FO_{252}	—	June 16, 2010	WISE	WISE	·	2.3 km	MPC · JPL
735323	2015 FY_{255}	—	March 9, 2011	Mount Lemmon	Mount Lemmon Survey	·	930 m	MPC · JPL
735324	2015 FA_{256}	—	November 18, 2003	Kitt Peak	Spacewatch	·	530 m	MPC · JPL
735325	2015 FY_{256}	—	March 23, 2015	Haleakala	Pan-STARRS 1	·	720 m	MPC · JPL
735326	2015 FF_{257}	—	November 11, 2007	Mount Lemmon	Mount Lemmon Survey	·	670 m	MPC · JPL
735327	2015 FO_{261}	—	February 16, 2015	Haleakala	Pan-STARRS 1	·	2.4 km	MPC · JPL
735328	2015 FK_{262}	—	January 31, 2015	Haleakala	Pan-STARRS 1	·	1.9 km	MPC · JPL
735329	2015 FM_{262}	—	February 16, 2015	Haleakala	Pan-STARRS 1	·	1 km	MPC · JPL
735330	2015 FZ_{264}	—	November 3, 2010	Mount Lemmon	Mount Lemmon Survey	·	630 m	MPC · JPL
735331	2015 FS_{265}	—	November 17, 2009	Mount Lemmon	Mount Lemmon Survey	·	1.2 km	MPC · JPL
735332	2015 FS_{266}	—	February 16, 2015	Haleakala	Pan-STARRS 1	AGN	980 m	MPC · JPL
735333	2015 FU_{267}	—	May 9, 2010	Mount Lemmon	Mount Lemmon Survey	·	2.1 km	MPC · JPL
735334	2015 FS_{268}	—	February 9, 2010	WISE	WISE	EUP	3.6 km	MPC · JPL
735335	2015 FV_{270}	—	November 12, 2001	Apache Point	SDSS Collaboration	·	2.5 km	MPC · JPL
735336	2015 FA_{272}	—	February 11, 2010	WISE	WISE	·	3.6 km	MPC · JPL
735337	2015 FE_{274}	—	February 17, 2015	Haleakala	Pan-STARRS 1	·	1.7 km	MPC · JPL
735338	2015 FL_{275}	—	January 19, 2015	Haleakala	Pan-STARRS 1	·	860 m	MPC · JPL
735339	2015 FY_{276}	—	December 15, 2009	Mount Lemmon	Mount Lemmon Survey	·	1.7 km	MPC · JPL
735340	2015 FX_{280}	—	April 5, 2010	WISE	WISE	·	1.7 km	MPC · JPL
735341	2015 FH_{281}	—	March 9, 2011	Mount Lemmon	Mount Lemmon Survey	·	1.0 km	MPC · JPL
735342	2015 FE_{283}	—	November 12, 2013	Mount Lemmon	Mount Lemmon Survey	·	610 m	MPC · JPL
735343	2015 FR_{283}	—	January 19, 2015	Haleakala	Pan-STARRS 1	·	920 m	MPC · JPL
735344	2015 FU_{283}	—	February 1, 2009	Mount Lemmon	Mount Lemmon Survey	·	2.9 km	MPC · JPL
735345	2015 FP_{284}	—	April 30, 2010	WISE	WISE	·	1.4 km	MPC · JPL
735346	2015 FY_{287}	—	April 8, 2010	Mount Lemmon	Mount Lemmon Survey	·	2.2 km	MPC · JPL
735347	2015 FA_{288}	—	October 15, 2012	Haleakala	Pan-STARRS 1	·	2.6 km	MPC · JPL
735348	2015 FW_{288}	—	January 17, 2010	WISE	WISE	·	3.1 km	MPC · JPL
735349	2015 FB_{292}	—	January 28, 2015	Haleakala	Pan-STARRS 1	·	1.8 km	MPC · JPL
735350	2015 FS_{292}	—	February 10, 2011	Mount Lemmon	Mount Lemmon Survey	MAS	590 m	MPC · JPL
735351	2015 FM_{293}	—	January 23, 2015	Haleakala	Pan-STARRS 1	·	850 m	MPC · JPL
735352	2015 FC_{295}	—	June 9, 2010	WISE	WISE	·	1.8 km	MPC · JPL
735353	2015 FF_{295}	—	March 20, 1999	Apache Point	SDSS Collaboration	·	720 m	MPC · JPL
735354	2015 FO_{300}	—	December 19, 2004	Mount Lemmon	Mount Lemmon Survey	·	2.2 km	MPC · JPL
735355	2015 FH_{303}	—	March 29, 2009	Mount Lemmon	Mount Lemmon Survey	·	2.4 km	MPC · JPL
735356	2015 FE_{306}	—	October 15, 2001	Kitt Peak	Spacewatch	·	2.7 km	MPC · JPL
735357	2015 FM_{307}	—	May 19, 2010	WISE	WISE	·	1.9 km	MPC · JPL
735358	2015 FD_{308}	—	January 27, 2007	Mount Lemmon	Mount Lemmon Survey	MAS	650 m	MPC · JPL
735359	2015 FC_{309}	—	March 27, 2010	WISE	WISE	·	2.3 km	MPC · JPL
735360	2015 FE_{311}	—	March 25, 2015	Haleakala	Pan-STARRS 1	·	2.6 km	MPC · JPL
735361	2015 FR_{311}	—	March 25, 2015	Haleakala	Pan-STARRS 1	·	1.1 km	MPC · JPL
735362	2015 FT_{314}	—	September 6, 2013	Mount Lemmon	Mount Lemmon Survey	·	590 m	MPC · JPL
735363	2015 FZ_{315}	—	September 26, 2012	Mount Lemmon	Mount Lemmon Survey	·	1.0 km	MPC · JPL
735364	2015 FG_{316}	—	October 1, 2013	Kitt Peak	Spacewatch	·	890 m	MPC · JPL
735365	2015 FG_{322}	—	January 24, 2003	Palomar	NEAT	·	2.2 km	MPC · JPL
735366	2015 FE_{323}	—	March 10, 2010	WISE	WISE	·	1.2 km	MPC · JPL
735367	2015 FJ_{323}	—	December 30, 2008	Mount Lemmon	Mount Lemmon Survey	·	2.7 km	MPC · JPL
735368	2015 FY_{324}	—	March 11, 2010	WISE	WISE	·	2.7 km	MPC · JPL
735369	2015 FA_{331}	—	February 27, 2015	Haleakala	Pan-STARRS 1	·	1.2 km	MPC · JPL
735370	2015 FF_{333}	—	April 19, 2010	WISE	WISE	·	3.5 km	MPC · JPL
735371	2015 FD_{334}	—	February 15, 2010	WISE	WISE	·	1.1 km	MPC · JPL
735372	2015 FT_{334}	—	April 30, 2004	Kitt Peak	Spacewatch	·	4.2 km	MPC · JPL
735373	2015 FM_{335}	—	March 3, 2005	Kitt Peak	Spacewatch	·	2.6 km	MPC · JPL
735374	2015 FY_{336}	—	October 27, 2013	Catalina	CSS	H	520 m	MPC · JPL
735375	2015 FG_{337}	—	May 8, 2010	WISE	WISE	·	3.0 km	MPC · JPL
735376	2015 FO_{337}	—	December 31, 2013	Mount Lemmon	Mount Lemmon Survey	·	1.5 km	MPC · JPL
735377	2015 FT_{337}	—	May 30, 2002	Palomar	NEAT	(194)	1.9 km	MPC · JPL
735378	2015 FP_{338}	—	February 7, 2008	Kitt Peak	Spacewatch	·	580 m	MPC · JPL
735379	2015 FB_{340}	—	September 26, 2005	Palomar	NEAT	PHO	1.2 km	MPC · JPL
735380	2015 FS_{342}	—	May 23, 2001	Cerro Tololo	Deep Ecliptic Survey	·	2.4 km	MPC · JPL
735381	2015 FZ_{342}	—	February 15, 2010	WISE	WISE	·	1.2 km	MPC · JPL
735382	2015 FQ_{343}	—	November 21, 2001	Apache Point	SDSS Collaboration	·	4.6 km	MPC · JPL
735383	2015 FE_{346}	—	March 16, 2010	Catalina	CSS	·	1.8 km	MPC · JPL
735384	2015 FW_{347}	—	September 29, 2008	Catalina	CSS	·	1.8 km	MPC · JPL
735385	2015 FZ_{347}	—	February 2, 2009	Mount Lemmon	Mount Lemmon Survey	EOS	1.4 km	MPC · JPL
735386	2015 FG_{351}	—	January 18, 2010	WISE	WISE	URS	4.1 km	MPC · JPL
735387	2015 FL_{351}	—	June 12, 2010	WISE	WISE	·	3.4 km	MPC · JPL
735388	2015 FY_{353}	—	September 25, 2009	Kitt Peak	Spacewatch	L4	6.8 km	MPC · JPL
735389	2015 FG_{354}	—	May 30, 2008	Mount Lemmon	Mount Lemmon Survey	·	640 m	MPC · JPL
735390	2015 FV_{360}	—	September 5, 2008	Kitt Peak	Spacewatch	L4	8.7 km	MPC · JPL
735391	2015 FS_{361}	—	February 17, 2010	Kitt Peak	Spacewatch	·	1.6 km	MPC · JPL
735392	2015 FF_{362}	—	January 25, 2006	Kitt Peak	Spacewatch	·	1.2 km	MPC · JPL
735393	2015 FQ_{363}	—	October 1, 2013	Kitt Peak	Spacewatch	THM	1.9 km	MPC · JPL
735394	2015 FZ_{363}	—	February 15, 2010	WISE	WISE	·	4.0 km	MPC · JPL
735395	2015 FX_{364}	—	April 2, 2005	Kitt Peak	Spacewatch	·	2.9 km	MPC · JPL
735396	2015 FE_{365}	—	November 9, 2013	Haleakala	Pan-STARRS 1	·	2.4 km	MPC · JPL
735397	2015 FD_{369}	—	June 2, 2010	WISE	WISE	·	2.7 km	MPC · JPL
735398	2015 FG_{372}	—	August 7, 2010	WISE	WISE	L4	10 km	MPC · JPL
735399	2015 FV_{375}	—	March 18, 2015	Haleakala	Pan-STARRS 1	·	1.2 km	MPC · JPL
735400	2015 FK_{377}	—	November 28, 2013	Mount Lemmon	Mount Lemmon Survey	·	2.5 km	MPC · JPL

== 735401–735500 ==
back to top

Designation			Discovery			Properties		Ref
Permanent	Provisional	Named after	Date	Site	Discoverer(s)	Category	Diam.	Ref
735401	2015 FG_{382}	—	December 27, 2006	Mount Lemmon	Mount Lemmon Survey	·	960 m	MPC · JPL
735402	2015 FD_{383}	—	October 25, 2000	Kitt Peak	Spacewatch	·	3.3 km	MPC · JPL
735403	2015 FR_{384}	—	June 20, 2006	Mount Lemmon	Mount Lemmon Survey	·	2.1 km	MPC · JPL
735404	2015 FT_{385}	—	June 29, 2005	Kitt Peak	Spacewatch	·	3.4 km	MPC · JPL
735405	2015 FF_{386}	—	March 20, 2015	Haleakala	Pan-STARRS 1	·	1.3 km	MPC · JPL
735406	2015 FT_{387}	—	March 20, 2015	Haleakala	Pan-STARRS 1	·	550 m	MPC · JPL
735407	2015 FH_{390}	—	October 26, 2009	Mount Lemmon	Mount Lemmon Survey	V	530 m	MPC · JPL
735408	2015 FU_{392}	—	October 18, 2012	Haleakala	Pan-STARRS 1	·	2.5 km	MPC · JPL
735409	2015 FU_{402}	—	December 11, 2013	Mount Lemmon	Mount Lemmon Survey	·	2.6 km	MPC · JPL
735410	2015 FW_{405}	—	March 3, 2011	Mount Lemmon	Mount Lemmon Survey	MAS	620 m	MPC · JPL
735411	2015 FV_{411}	—	March 28, 2015	Haleakala	Pan-STARRS 1	·	1.2 km	MPC · JPL
735412	2015 FB_{412}	—	March 28, 2015	Haleakala	Pan-STARRS 1	·	1.6 km	MPC · JPL
735413	2015 FS_{414}	—	March 22, 2015	Mount Lemmon	Mount Lemmon Survey	·	930 m	MPC · JPL
735414	2015 FY_{414}	—	March 22, 2015	Haleakala	Pan-STARRS 1	·	860 m	MPC · JPL
735415	2015 FO_{415}	—	March 22, 2010	WISE	WISE	·	4.0 km	MPC · JPL
735416	2015 FW_{416}	—	June 10, 2010	WISE	WISE	·	1.9 km	MPC · JPL
735417	2015 FZ_{418}	—	March 16, 2015	Haleakala	Pan-STARRS 1	·	3.3 km	MPC · JPL
735418	2015 FU_{420}	—	March 18, 2015	Haleakala	Pan-STARRS 1	·	1.1 km	MPC · JPL
735419	2015 FL_{433}	—	March 21, 2015	Mount Lemmon	Mount Lemmon Survey	NYS	690 m	MPC · JPL
735420	2015 FO_{434}	—	March 29, 2015	Kitt Peak	Spacewatch	·	790 m	MPC · JPL
735421	2015 FE_{437}	—	March 24, 2015	Haleakala	Pan-STARRS 1	L4	6.6 km	MPC · JPL
735422	2015 FN_{438}	—	March 17, 2015	Haleakala	Pan-STARRS 1	·	880 m	MPC · JPL
735423	2015 FS_{438}	—	March 27, 2015	Haleakala	Pan-STARRS 1	·	590 m	MPC · JPL
735424	2015 FJ_{439}	—	March 16, 2015	Haleakala	Pan-STARRS 1	·	2.4 km	MPC · JPL
735425	2015 FJ_{441}	—	September 26, 2003	Apache Point	SDSS Collaboration	·	1.2 km	MPC · JPL
735426	2015 FB_{446}	—	March 22, 2015	Haleakala	Pan-STARRS 1	·	3.7 km	MPC · JPL
735427	2015 FQ_{449}	—	March 27, 2015	Haleakala	Pan-STARRS 1	(194)	1.3 km	MPC · JPL
735428	2015 FE_{452}	—	March 29, 2015	Haleakala	Pan-STARRS 1	H	360 m	MPC · JPL
735429	2015 FH_{457}	—	March 25, 2015	Mount Lemmon	Mount Lemmon Survey	·	2.4 km	MPC · JPL
735430	2015 FR_{460}	—	March 25, 2015	Haleakala	Pan-STARRS 1	·	2.9 km	MPC · JPL
735431	2015 GL_{1}	—	March 17, 2004	Apache Point	SDSS Collaboration	·	2.9 km	MPC · JPL
735432	2015 GO_{1}	—	February 22, 2002	Palomar	NEAT	·	2.5 km	MPC · JPL
735433	2015 GK_{7}	—	December 14, 2007	Mount Lemmon	Mount Lemmon Survey	·	3.6 km	MPC · JPL
735434	2015 GV_{7}	—	February 6, 2010	WISE	WISE	·	2.2 km	MPC · JPL
735435	2015 GZ_{10}	—	January 17, 2010	WISE	WISE	·	2.0 km	MPC · JPL
735436	2015 GE_{11}	—	February 18, 2010	WISE	WISE	·	3.2 km	MPC · JPL
735437	2015 GR_{11}	—	June 17, 2005	Mount Lemmon	Mount Lemmon Survey	L4	10 km	MPC · JPL
735438	2015 GN_{15}	—	September 6, 2008	Mount Lemmon	Mount Lemmon Survey	L4	7.7 km	MPC · JPL
735439	2015 GS_{16}	—	April 11, 2002	Palomar	NEAT	·	1.4 km	MPC · JPL
735440	2015 GC_{18}	—	January 25, 2015	Haleakala	Pan-STARRS 1	NYS	730 m	MPC · JPL
735441	2015 GQ_{24}	—	January 30, 2015	Haleakala	Pan-STARRS 1	·	1.9 km	MPC · JPL
735442	2015 GJ_{25}	—	August 30, 2002	Kitt Peak	Spacewatch	·	2.0 km	MPC · JPL
735443	2015 GL_{30}	—	November 20, 2009	Kitt Peak	Spacewatch	(5)	1.0 km	MPC · JPL
735444	2015 GP_{30}	—	November 4, 2013	Mount Lemmon	Mount Lemmon Survey	·	850 m	MPC · JPL
735445	2015 GY_{32}	—	March 22, 2015	Haleakala	Pan-STARRS 1	·	980 m	MPC · JPL
735446	2015 GP_{33}	—	July 23, 2010	WISE	WISE	·	2.8 km	MPC · JPL
735447	2015 GU_{33}	—	August 22, 2001	Kitt Peak	Spacewatch	PHO	910 m	MPC · JPL
735448	2015 GW_{33}	—	April 22, 2002	Palomar	NEAT	EUN	1.4 km	MPC · JPL
735449	2015 GM_{34}	—	June 4, 2011	Nogales	M. Schwartz, P. R. Holvorcem	·	1.3 km	MPC · JPL
735450	2015 GM_{36}	—	April 24, 2004	Bergisch Gladbach	W. Bickel	·	3.9 km	MPC · JPL
735451	2015 GV_{36}	—	March 14, 2004	Nogales	P. R. Holvorcem, M. Schwartz	·	4.4 km	MPC · JPL
735452	2015 GG_{37}	—	January 23, 2015	Haleakala	Pan-STARRS 1	·	2.0 km	MPC · JPL
735453	2015 GA_{38}	—	January 23, 2015	Haleakala	Pan-STARRS 1	(2076)	570 m	MPC · JPL
735454	2015 GF_{39}	—	March 26, 2011	Mount Lemmon	Mount Lemmon Survey	·	700 m	MPC · JPL
735455	2015 GK_{39}	—	October 21, 2003	Palomar	NEAT	·	850 m	MPC · JPL
735456	2015 GQ_{39}	—	September 29, 2008	Catalina	CSS	·	2.0 km	MPC · JPL
735457	2015 GL_{47}	—	April 10, 2010	Kitt Peak	Spacewatch	·	1.8 km	MPC · JPL
735458	2015 GG_{51}	—	March 31, 2008	Mount Lemmon	Mount Lemmon Survey	·	590 m	MPC · JPL
735459	2015 GJ_{52}	—	November 8, 2013	Kitt Peak	Spacewatch	·	890 m	MPC · JPL
735460	2015 GQ_{53}	—	April 14, 2015	Kitt Peak	Spacewatch	·	1.0 km	MPC · JPL
735461	2015 GC_{69}	—	April 11, 2015	Mount Lemmon	Mount Lemmon Survey	·	1.3 km	MPC · JPL
735462	2015 HJ_{2}	—	December 10, 2009	Mount Lemmon	Mount Lemmon Survey	·	1.5 km	MPC · JPL
735463	2015 HD_{6}	—	May 20, 2006	Mount Lemmon	Mount Lemmon Survey	·	2.1 km	MPC · JPL
735464	2015 HE_{6}	—	October 11, 2004	Kitt Peak	Deep Ecliptic Survey	·	2.2 km	MPC · JPL
735465	2015 HJ_{6}	—	September 30, 2006	Kitt Peak	Spacewatch	·	730 m	MPC · JPL
735466	2015 HX_{6}	—	September 3, 2002	Palomar	NEAT	NAE	2.8 km	MPC · JPL
735467	2015 HU_{7}	—	February 17, 2015	Haleakala	Pan-STARRS 1	·	1.6 km	MPC · JPL
735468	2015 HX_{7}	—	February 17, 2015	Haleakala	Pan-STARRS 1	·	1.0 km	MPC · JPL
735469	2015 HF_{8}	—	September 7, 2008	Catalina	CSS	·	1.4 km	MPC · JPL
735470	2015 HM_{8}	—	October 19, 2007	Catalina	CSS	·	2.5 km	MPC · JPL
735471	2015 HW_{12}	—	March 11, 2015	Kitt Peak	Spacewatch	·	510 m	MPC · JPL
735472	2015 HV_{16}	—	October 13, 2007	Kitt Peak	Spacewatch	·	2.0 km	MPC · JPL
735473	2015 HE_{19}	—	May 24, 2010	WISE	WISE	·	1.5 km	MPC · JPL
735474	2015 HT_{19}	—	February 8, 2011	Mount Lemmon	Mount Lemmon Survey	·	1.0 km	MPC · JPL
735475	2015 HO_{21}	—	April 13, 2015	Mount Lemmon	Mount Lemmon Survey	·	1 km	MPC · JPL
735476	2015 HM_{23}	—	February 23, 2015	Haleakala	Pan-STARRS 1	·	610 m	MPC · JPL
735477	2015 HK_{24}	—	June 21, 2010	WISE	WISE	·	1.7 km	MPC · JPL
735478	2015 HY_{24}	—	March 17, 2015	Haleakala	Pan-STARRS 1	·	720 m	MPC · JPL
735479	2015 HF_{26}	—	May 16, 2010	Kitt Peak	Spacewatch	·	1.5 km	MPC · JPL
735480	2015 HP_{29}	—	July 18, 2012	Catalina	CSS	·	1.1 km	MPC · JPL
735481	2015 HT_{30}	—	January 23, 2015	Haleakala	Pan-STARRS 1	·	1.2 km	MPC · JPL
735482	2015 HC_{32}	—	December 4, 2008	Kitt Peak	Spacewatch	HOF	2.5 km	MPC · JPL
735483	2015 HE_{32}	—	June 8, 2005	Kitt Peak	Spacewatch	·	2.1 km	MPC · JPL
735484	2015 HQ_{32}	—	April 2, 2005	Kitt Peak	Spacewatch	·	2.2 km	MPC · JPL
735485	2015 HJ_{34}	—	March 16, 2009	Kitt Peak	Spacewatch	·	3.5 km	MPC · JPL
735486	2015 HU_{35}	—	December 31, 2013	Haleakala	Pan-STARRS 1	·	2.3 km	MPC · JPL
735487	2015 HW_{36}	—	December 15, 2009	Bergisch Gladbach	W. Bickel	·	1.1 km	MPC · JPL
735488	2015 HM_{37}	—	June 16, 2012	Haleakala	Pan-STARRS 1	·	670 m	MPC · JPL
735489	2015 HB_{38}	—	January 26, 2014	Haleakala	Pan-STARRS 1	·	2.3 km	MPC · JPL
735490	2015 HG_{40}	—	March 17, 2004	Kitt Peak	Spacewatch	EMA	2.7 km	MPC · JPL
735491	2015 HZ_{41}	—	March 31, 2004	Kitt Peak	Spacewatch	NYS	1.0 km	MPC · JPL
735492	2015 HB_{43}	—	January 29, 2009	Mount Lemmon	Mount Lemmon Survey	·	3.1 km	MPC · JPL
735493	2015 HA_{44}	—	October 20, 2003	Kitt Peak	Spacewatch	HOF	2.8 km	MPC · JPL
735494	2015 HG_{44}	—	October 24, 2009	Mount Lemmon	Mount Lemmon Survey	·	1.0 km	MPC · JPL
735495	2015 HQ_{44}	—	October 2, 2006	Mount Lemmon	Mount Lemmon Survey	·	2.2 km	MPC · JPL
735496	2015 HT_{44}	—	March 21, 2015	Haleakala	Pan-STARRS 1	·	570 m	MPC · JPL
735497	2015 HO_{45}	—	October 23, 2001	Palomar	NEAT	·	1.1 km	MPC · JPL
735498	2015 HG_{46}	—	April 11, 2010	Mount Lemmon	Mount Lemmon Survey	·	1.5 km	MPC · JPL
735499	2015 HG_{49}	—	April 10, 2010	Kitt Peak	Spacewatch	·	2.4 km	MPC · JPL
735500	2015 HM_{52}	—	February 25, 2011	Mount Lemmon	Mount Lemmon Survey	·	900 m	MPC · JPL

== 735501–735600 ==
back to top

Designation			Discovery			Properties		Ref
Permanent	Provisional	Named after	Date	Site	Discoverer(s)	Category	Diam.	Ref
735501	2015 HR_{52}	—	November 1, 2008	Mount Lemmon	Mount Lemmon Survey	HOF	2.5 km	MPC · JPL
735502	2015 HS_{53}	—	June 26, 2010	WISE	WISE	·	1.9 km	MPC · JPL
735503	2015 HA_{54}	—	January 22, 2010	WISE	WISE	·	2.3 km	MPC · JPL
735504	2015 HD_{54}	—	February 26, 2010	WISE	WISE	ADE	1.7 km	MPC · JPL
735505	2015 HV_{55}	—	March 31, 2010	WISE	WISE	·	1.2 km	MPC · JPL
735506	2015 HY_{55}	—	September 12, 2001	Socorro	LINEAR	·	2.2 km	MPC · JPL
735507	2015 HO_{56}	—	April 18, 2015	Haleakala	Pan-STARRS 1	·	2.9 km	MPC · JPL
735508	2015 HK_{57}	—	October 1, 2011	Kitt Peak	Spacewatch	·	2.5 km	MPC · JPL
735509	2015 HV_{57}	—	October 22, 2005	Kitt Peak	Spacewatch	V	580 m	MPC · JPL
735510	2015 HA_{58}	—	April 18, 2015	Haleakala	Pan-STARRS 1	·	1 km	MPC · JPL
735511	2015 HF_{58}	—	October 31, 2008	Mount Lemmon	Mount Lemmon Survey	·	2.8 km	MPC · JPL
735512	2015 HJ_{58}	—	March 23, 2004	Kitt Peak	Spacewatch	·	2.0 km	MPC · JPL
735513	2015 HT_{59}	—	April 21, 2010	Siding Spring	SSS	·	2.0 km	MPC · JPL
735514	2015 HW_{60}	—	February 27, 2015	Haleakala	Pan-STARRS 1	·	1.4 km	MPC · JPL
735515	2015 HS_{62}	—	March 12, 2010	Catalina	CSS	(13314)	2.4 km	MPC · JPL
735516	2015 HU_{62}	—	March 11, 2002	Palomar	NEAT	·	1.3 km	MPC · JPL
735517	2015 HK_{70}	—	September 30, 2006	Mount Lemmon	Mount Lemmon Survey	·	2.2 km	MPC · JPL
735518	2015 HZ_{72}	—	April 19, 2015	Mount Lemmon	Mount Lemmon Survey	·	990 m	MPC · JPL
735519	2015 HQ_{74}	—	May 13, 2011	Mount Lemmon	Mount Lemmon Survey	·	1 km	MPC · JPL
735520	2015 HH_{84}	—	April 20, 2015	Cerro Paranal	Altmann, M., Prusti, T.	·	680 m	MPC · JPL
735521	2015 HS_{93}	—	October 12, 2009	Mount Lemmon	Mount Lemmon Survey	BAP	740 m	MPC · JPL
735522	2015 HH_{94}	—	April 24, 2003	Kitt Peak	Spacewatch	·	780 m	MPC · JPL
735523	2015 HY_{94}	—	December 27, 2006	Mount Lemmon	Mount Lemmon Survey	NYS	930 m	MPC · JPL
735524	2015 HT_{97}	—	March 18, 2015	Haleakala	Pan-STARRS 1	·	840 m	MPC · JPL
735525	2015 HY_{99}	—	April 23, 2015	Haleakala	Pan-STARRS 1	MAS	650 m	MPC · JPL
735526	2015 HJ_{100}	—	May 18, 2010	WISE	WISE	·	3.5 km	MPC · JPL
735527	2015 HM_{102}	—	April 15, 2010	Mount Lemmon	Mount Lemmon Survey	·	1.3 km	MPC · JPL
735528	2015 HD_{103}	—	July 15, 2005	Kitt Peak	Spacewatch	·	5.5 km	MPC · JPL
735529	2015 HM_{103}	—	September 26, 2006	Catalina	CSS	·	3.3 km	MPC · JPL
735530	2015 HO_{104}	—	May 3, 2008	Mount Lemmon	Mount Lemmon Survey	V	520 m	MPC · JPL
735531	2015 HS_{105}	—	March 22, 2015	Haleakala	Pan-STARRS 1	EOS	1.5 km	MPC · JPL
735532	2015 HZ_{105}	—	April 25, 2003	Kitt Peak	Spacewatch	·	900 m	MPC · JPL
735533	2015 HB_{107}	—	January 28, 2015	Haleakala	Pan-STARRS 1	·	1.9 km	MPC · JPL
735534	2015 HM_{107}	—	December 7, 2005	Kitt Peak	Spacewatch	ULA	4.0 km	MPC · JPL
735535	2015 HY_{107}	—	April 12, 2010	WISE	WISE	·	1.2 km	MPC · JPL
735536	2015 HA_{108}	—	January 25, 2014	Oukaïmeden	M. Ory	VER	2.1 km	MPC · JPL
735537	2015 HF_{108}	—	April 23, 2015	Haleakala	Pan-STARRS 1	·	910 m	MPC · JPL
735538	2015 HM_{109}	—	September 6, 2012	Haleakala	Pan-STARRS 1	EUN	1.1 km	MPC · JPL
735539	2015 HT_{109}	—	January 28, 2015	Haleakala	Pan-STARRS 1	·	2.3 km	MPC · JPL
735540	2015 HN_{110}	—	January 28, 2015	Haleakala	Pan-STARRS 1	·	870 m	MPC · JPL
735541	2015 HL_{111}	—	August 23, 2011	Haleakala	Pan-STARRS 1	·	2.3 km	MPC · JPL
735542	2015 HY_{111}	—	July 3, 2005	Palomar	NEAT	·	4.1 km	MPC · JPL
735543	2015 HZ_{114}	—	March 18, 2010	WISE	WISE	·	2.2 km	MPC · JPL
735544	2015 HU_{115}	—	November 23, 2006	Kitt Peak	Spacewatch	·	3.3 km	MPC · JPL
735545	2015 HZ_{118}	—	March 9, 2011	Mount Lemmon	Mount Lemmon Survey	·	1.1 km	MPC · JPL
735546	2015 HX_{120}	—	September 19, 1998	Apache Point	SDSS Collaboration	·	1.5 km	MPC · JPL
735547	2015 HP_{121}	—	March 18, 2015	Haleakala	Pan-STARRS 1	·	1.2 km	MPC · JPL
735548	2015 HX_{121}	—	April 23, 2015	Haleakala	Pan-STARRS 1	·	1.2 km	MPC · JPL
735549	2015 HO_{123}	—	December 23, 2006	Mount Lemmon	Mount Lemmon Survey	NYS	1.0 km	MPC · JPL
735550	2015 HE_{125}	—	March 28, 2009	Kitt Peak	Spacewatch	·	2.3 km	MPC · JPL
735551	2015 HB_{126}	—	October 21, 2009	Mount Lemmon	Mount Lemmon Survey	·	890 m	MPC · JPL
735552	2015 HS_{134}	—	April 10, 2015	Mount Lemmon	Mount Lemmon Survey	NYS · fast?	630 m	MPC · JPL
735553	2015 HR_{135}	—	October 8, 2012	Haleakala	Pan-STARRS 1	·	1.3 km	MPC · JPL
735554	2015 HS_{143}	—	December 30, 2007	Mount Lemmon	Mount Lemmon Survey	·	2.5 km	MPC · JPL
735555	2015 HM_{144}	—	January 10, 2007	Kitt Peak	Spacewatch	·	1.1 km	MPC · JPL
735556	2015 HO_{145}	—	February 28, 2010	WISE	WISE	·	1.2 km	MPC · JPL
735557	2015 HZ_{145}	—	August 11, 2012	Siding Spring	SSS	V	660 m	MPC · JPL
735558	2015 HX_{147}	—	April 13, 2004	Palomar	NEAT	·	870 m	MPC · JPL
735559	2015 HE_{149}	—	April 23, 2015	Haleakala	Pan-STARRS 1	·	950 m	MPC · JPL
735560	2015 HS_{151}	—	May 8, 2011	Mount Lemmon	Mount Lemmon Survey	·	890 m	MPC · JPL
735561	2015 HD_{152}	—	April 23, 2015	Haleakala	Pan-STARRS 1	H	430 m	MPC · JPL
735562	2015 HR_{154}	—	May 29, 2010	WISE	WISE	·	3.9 km	MPC · JPL
735563	2015 HY_{154}	—	January 16, 2010	WISE	WISE	L4	10 km	MPC · JPL
735564	2015 HJ_{155}	—	October 7, 1996	Kitt Peak	Spacewatch	L4	10 km	MPC · JPL
735565	2015 HQ_{156}	—	January 31, 2004	Apache Point	SDSS Collaboration	·	800 m	MPC · JPL
735566	2015 HQ_{158}	—	April 20, 2007	Mount Lemmon	Mount Lemmon Survey	·	730 m	MPC · JPL
735567	2015 HY_{159}	—	November 11, 2009	Mount Lemmon	Mount Lemmon Survey	·	1.1 km	MPC · JPL
735568	2015 HR_{166}	—	April 23, 2015	Haleakala	Pan-STARRS 1	·	2.4 km	MPC · JPL
735569	2015 HN_{168}	—	January 15, 2007	Mauna Kea	P. A. Wiegert	THM	1.9 km	MPC · JPL
735570	2015 HO_{174}	—	April 18, 2015	Mount Lemmon	Mount Lemmon Survey	·	590 m	MPC · JPL
735571	2015 HT_{176}	—	April 25, 2010	WISE	WISE	T_{j} (2.97)	4.1 km	MPC · JPL
735572	2015 HD_{177}	—	November 14, 2006	Kitt Peak	Spacewatch	·	1.1 km	MPC · JPL
735573	2015 HH_{178}	—	March 25, 2010	WISE	WISE	·	2.8 km	MPC · JPL
735574	2015 HP_{179}	—	October 14, 2004	Kitt Peak	Spacewatch	·	1.8 km	MPC · JPL
735575	2015 HF_{180}	—	March 10, 2005	Moletai	K. Černis, Zdanavicius, J.	·	3.5 km	MPC · JPL
735576	2015 HL_{180}	—	January 15, 2010	WISE	WISE	·	2.3 km	MPC · JPL
735577	2015 HJ_{181}	—	September 28, 2002	Haleakala	NEAT	·	3.6 km	MPC · JPL
735578	2015 HO_{181}	—	May 20, 2004	Campo Imperatore	CINEOS	T_{j} (2.98)	3.6 km	MPC · JPL
735579	2015 HD_{187}	—	March 20, 2002	Kitt Peak	Spacewatch	·	1.0 km	MPC · JPL
735580	2015 HL_{187}	—	April 25, 2015	Haleakala	Pan-STARRS 1	·	910 m	MPC · JPL
735581	2015 HB_{189}	—	April 18, 2015	Haleakala	Pan-STARRS 1	·	2.5 km	MPC · JPL
735582	2015 HY_{191}	—	June 13, 2005	Mount Lemmon	Mount Lemmon Survey	·	2.1 km	MPC · JPL
735583	2015 HG_{204}	—	May 23, 2011	Nogales	M. Schwartz, P. R. Holvorcem	·	910 m	MPC · JPL
735584	2015 HH_{208}	—	April 23, 2015	Haleakala	Pan-STARRS 1	(5)	770 m	MPC · JPL
735585	2015 HB_{213}	—	April 18, 2015	Haleakala	Pan-STARRS 1	EUN	860 m	MPC · JPL
735586	2015 HF_{213}	—	April 24, 2015	Haleakala	Pan-STARRS 1	V	520 m	MPC · JPL
735587	2015 HS_{213}	—	April 24, 2015	Haleakala	Pan-STARRS 1	PHO	890 m	MPC · JPL
735588	2015 HU_{220}	—	April 19, 2015	Mount Lemmon	Mount Lemmon Survey	·	500 m	MPC · JPL
735589	2015 HG_{233}	—	August 26, 2016	Haleakala	Pan-STARRS 1	·	780 m	MPC · JPL
735590	2015 HR_{233}	—	August 9, 2016	Haleakala	Pan-STARRS 1	PHO	860 m	MPC · JPL
735591	2015 JB_{2}	—	December 3, 2010	Mount Lemmon	Mount Lemmon Survey	·	1.2 km	MPC · JPL
735592	2015 JL_{2}	—	October 14, 2009	Mount Lemmon	Mount Lemmon Survey	L4	10 km	MPC · JPL
735593	2015 JT_{2}	—	February 5, 2014	Kitt Peak	Spacewatch	VER	2.2 km	MPC · JPL
735594	2015 JW_{3}	—	April 2, 2010	WISE	WISE	·	2.9 km	MPC · JPL
735595	2015 JL_{7}	—	December 31, 2008	Mount Lemmon	Mount Lemmon Survey	·	2.3 km	MPC · JPL
735596	2015 JS_{9}	—	February 1, 2003	Palomar	NEAT	·	3.2 km	MPC · JPL
735597	2015 JU_{9}	—	October 25, 2008	Kitt Peak	Spacewatch	·	1.5 km	MPC · JPL
735598	2015 JY_{9}	—	September 28, 2011	Kitt Peak	Spacewatch	·	3.0 km	MPC · JPL
735599	2015 JO_{10}	—	February 17, 2010	WISE	WISE	·	2.2 km	MPC · JPL
735600	2015 JW_{12}	—	November 9, 2008	Kitt Peak	Spacewatch	·	790 m	MPC · JPL

== 735601–735700 ==
back to top

Designation			Discovery			Properties		Ref
Permanent	Provisional	Named after	Date	Site	Discoverer(s)	Category	Diam.	Ref
735601	2015 JM_{14}	—	May 15, 2015	Haleakala	Pan-STARRS 1	·	1.2 km	MPC · JPL
735602	2015 JX_{19}	—	May 11, 2015	Mount Lemmon	Mount Lemmon Survey	·	1.5 km	MPC · JPL
735603	2015 JJ_{20}	—	May 10, 2015	Mount Lemmon	Mount Lemmon Survey	·	1.3 km	MPC · JPL
735604	2015 JG_{23}	—	May 13, 2015	Mount Lemmon	Mount Lemmon Survey	·	2.0 km	MPC · JPL
735605	2015 JM_{27}	—	May 12, 2015	Mount Lemmon	Mount Lemmon Survey	·	1.9 km	MPC · JPL
735606	2015 KB_{3}	—	March 9, 2005	Anderson Mesa	LONEOS	·	2.0 km	MPC · JPL
735607	2015 KV_{3}	—	October 30, 2008	Kitt Peak	Spacewatch	EUN	1.2 km	MPC · JPL
735608	2015 KJ_{4}	—	May 16, 2010	Mount Lemmon	Mount Lemmon Survey	·	2.4 km	MPC · JPL
735609	2015 KZ_{5}	—	August 13, 2012	Haleakala	Pan-STARRS 1	·	1.0 km	MPC · JPL
735610	2015 KY_{7}	—	March 7, 2010	WISE	WISE	·	2.3 km	MPC · JPL
735611	2015 KH_{8}	—	June 17, 2010	Mount Lemmon	Mount Lemmon Survey	·	3.1 km	MPC · JPL
735612	2015 KR_{8}	—	March 3, 2010	WISE	WISE	·	3.4 km	MPC · JPL
735613	2015 KQ_{12}	—	January 28, 2014	Kitt Peak	Spacewatch	·	1.4 km	MPC · JPL
735614	2015 KN_{13}	—	November 6, 2005	Catalina	CSS	T_{j} (2.99) · (895)	4.1 km	MPC · JPL
735615	2015 KQ_{13}	—	March 28, 2015	Haleakala	Pan-STARRS 1	MAR	1.1 km	MPC · JPL
735616	2015 KT_{22}	—	April 21, 2002	Palomar	NEAT	·	4.8 km	MPC · JPL
735617	2015 KK_{24}	—	September 20, 2006	Anderson Mesa	LONEOS	·	2.6 km	MPC · JPL
735618	2015 KF_{25}	—	April 15, 2010	WISE	WISE	·	4.0 km	MPC · JPL
735619	2015 KT_{25}	—	March 29, 2011	Mount Lemmon	Mount Lemmon Survey	·	900 m	MPC · JPL
735620	2015 KH_{28}	—	February 9, 2010	Kitt Peak	Spacewatch	·	1.3 km	MPC · JPL
735621	2015 KM_{28}	—	April 20, 2010	WISE	WISE	·	1.2 km	MPC · JPL
735622	2015 KL_{30}	—	October 9, 2012	Mount Lemmon	Mount Lemmon Survey	·	880 m	MPC · JPL
735623	2015 KH_{31}	—	March 1, 2008	Kitt Peak	Spacewatch	V	450 m	MPC · JPL
735624	2015 KB_{33}	—	May 10, 2010	Mount Lemmon	Mount Lemmon Survey	·	1.9 km	MPC · JPL
735625	2015 KA_{34}	—	September 21, 2009	Kitt Peak	Spacewatch	·	810 m	MPC · JPL
735626	2015 KG_{35}	—	May 10, 2015	Mount Lemmon	Mount Lemmon Survey	·	980 m	MPC · JPL
735627	2015 KJ_{36}	—	April 9, 2003	Kitt Peak	Spacewatch	V	780 m	MPC · JPL
735628	2015 KZ_{36}	—	July 14, 2010	WISE	WISE	·	3.4 km	MPC · JPL
735629	2015 KS_{39}	—	October 16, 2003	Kitt Peak	Spacewatch	(5)	1.4 km	MPC · JPL
735630	2015 KP_{43}	—	May 20, 2015	Haleakala	Pan-STARRS 1	·	1.5 km	MPC · JPL
735631	2015 KW_{44}	—	November 18, 2008	Kitt Peak	Spacewatch	·	2.0 km	MPC · JPL
735632	2015 KL_{45}	—	May 20, 2015	Haleakala	Pan-STARRS 1	·	820 m	MPC · JPL
735633	2015 KV_{47}	—	April 24, 2010	WISE	WISE	·	1.4 km	MPC · JPL
735634	2015 KJ_{49}	—	May 20, 2010	WISE	WISE	·	2.6 km	MPC · JPL
735635	2015 KS_{50}	—	April 1, 2011	Mount Lemmon	Mount Lemmon Survey	CLA	1.1 km	MPC · JPL
735636	2015 KA_{53}	—	May 3, 2010	WISE	WISE	·	4.6 km	MPC · JPL
735637	2015 KN_{54}	—	May 20, 2015	Haleakala	Pan-STARRS 1	EOS	1.4 km	MPC · JPL
735638	2015 KR_{55}	—	March 16, 2004	Kitt Peak	Spacewatch	NYS	830 m	MPC · JPL
735639	2015 KC_{59}	—	October 25, 2008	Mount Lemmon	Mount Lemmon Survey	·	1.2 km	MPC · JPL
735640	2015 KR_{59}	—	October 24, 2005	Mauna Kea	A. Boattini	PHO	3.2 km	MPC · JPL
735641	2015 KD_{61}	—	January 22, 2015	Haleakala	Pan-STARRS 1	·	940 m	MPC · JPL
735642	2015 KD_{62}	—	October 8, 2002	Anderson Mesa	LONEOS	DOR	2.8 km	MPC · JPL
735643	2015 KL_{62}	—	May 20, 2010	WISE	WISE	·	1.7 km	MPC · JPL
735644	2015 KG_{63}	—	April 22, 2010	WISE	WISE	·	3.0 km	MPC · JPL
735645	2015 KS_{65}	—	March 30, 2015	Haleakala	Pan-STARRS 1	·	1.1 km	MPC · JPL
735646	2015 KJ_{68}	—	February 21, 2010	WISE	WISE	·	1.7 km	MPC · JPL
735647	2015 KF_{69}	—	December 4, 2007	Mount Lemmon	Mount Lemmon Survey	·	2.4 km	MPC · JPL
735648	2015 KN_{69}	—	July 10, 2005	Kitt Peak	Spacewatch	EOS	1.9 km	MPC · JPL
735649	2015 KT_{71}	—	August 27, 1995	Kitt Peak	Spacewatch	·	2.3 km	MPC · JPL
735650	2015 KZ_{71}	—	April 24, 2006	Kitt Peak	Spacewatch	·	1.5 km	MPC · JPL
735651	2015 KQ_{75}	—	May 16, 2005	Kitt Peak	Spacewatch	·	4.1 km	MPC · JPL
735652	2015 KU_{75}	—	January 28, 2007	Catalina	CSS	·	1.1 km	MPC · JPL
735653	2015 KP_{76}	—	March 31, 2015	Haleakala	Pan-STARRS 1	·	910 m	MPC · JPL
735654	2015 KK_{78}	—	September 18, 2011	Mount Lemmon	Mount Lemmon Survey	·	1.9 km	MPC · JPL
735655	2015 KT_{81}	—	April 30, 2010	WISE	WISE	·	3.4 km	MPC · JPL
735656	2015 KO_{83}	—	December 21, 2006	Mount Lemmon	Mount Lemmon Survey	·	4.0 km	MPC · JPL
735657	2015 KV_{87}	—	October 5, 2004	Palomar	NEAT	·	1.3 km	MPC · JPL
735658	2015 KQ_{97}	—	January 26, 2014	Haleakala	Pan-STARRS 1	·	2.5 km	MPC · JPL
735659	2015 KH_{98}	—	October 5, 2012	Haleakala	Pan-STARRS 1	·	1.2 km	MPC · JPL
735660	2015 KF_{100}	—	May 21, 2015	Haleakala	Pan-STARRS 1	·	2.7 km	MPC · JPL
735661	2015 KO_{100}	—	May 21, 2015	Haleakala	Pan-STARRS 1	·	2.8 km	MPC · JPL
735662	2015 KL_{101}	—	April 17, 2010	Andrushivka	Kyrylenko, P., Y. Ivaščenko	·	1.9 km	MPC · JPL
735663	2015 KR_{104}	—	May 21, 2015	Haleakala	Pan-STARRS 1	·	1.1 km	MPC · JPL
735664	2015 KY_{104}	—	May 21, 2015	Haleakala	Pan-STARRS 1	·	2.3 km	MPC · JPL
735665	2015 KZ_{104}	—	May 21, 2015	Haleakala	Pan-STARRS 1	EUN	940 m	MPC · JPL
735666	2015 KA_{105}	—	April 23, 2015	Haleakala	Pan-STARRS 1	·	990 m	MPC · JPL
735667	2015 KZ_{107}	—	May 16, 2005	Kitt Peak	Spacewatch	TRE	2.6 km	MPC · JPL
735668	2015 KJ_{112}	—	March 30, 2011	Haleakala	Pan-STARRS 1	·	850 m	MPC · JPL
735669	2015 KC_{113}	—	May 17, 2010	WISE	WISE	·	1.1 km	MPC · JPL
735670	2015 KY_{115}	—	October 28, 2008	Kitt Peak	Spacewatch	·	1.2 km	MPC · JPL
735671	2015 KL_{116}	—	December 2, 1996	Kitt Peak	Spacewatch	·	1.3 km	MPC · JPL
735672	2015 KV_{116}	—	May 21, 2015	Haleakala	Pan-STARRS 1	·	1.9 km	MPC · JPL
735673	2015 KD_{117}	—	June 22, 2010	WISE	WISE	·	1.9 km	MPC · JPL
735674	2015 KG_{118}	—	January 17, 2009	Kitt Peak	Spacewatch	·	2.5 km	MPC · JPL
735675	2015 KC_{119}	—	April 12, 2010	WISE	WISE	LIX	3.5 km	MPC · JPL
735676	2015 KZ_{119}	—	May 19, 2010	WISE	WISE	·	3.2 km	MPC · JPL
735677	2015 KU_{122}	—	March 12, 2010	Mount Lemmon	Mount Lemmon Survey	·	1.5 km	MPC · JPL
735678	2015 KM_{123}	—	October 23, 2001	Palomar	NEAT	·	1.7 km	MPC · JPL
735679	2015 KR_{124}	—	October 15, 2004	Mount Lemmon	Mount Lemmon Survey	·	1.3 km	MPC · JPL
735680	2015 KX_{125}	—	May 25, 2006	Mauna Kea	P. A. Wiegert	·	2.1 km	MPC · JPL
735681	2015 KM_{127}	—	June 28, 2010	WISE	WISE	·	1.8 km	MPC · JPL
735682	2015 KH_{131}	—	May 22, 2015	Haleakala	Pan-STARRS 1	EUN	760 m	MPC · JPL
735683	2015 KM_{132}	—	May 5, 2010	Charleston	R. Holmes	HNS	1.3 km	MPC · JPL
735684	2015 KS_{132}	—	December 18, 2001	Kitt Peak	Deep Lens Survey	·	3.3 km	MPC · JPL
735685	2015 KW_{132}	—	July 23, 2003	Palomar	NEAT	·	4.2 km	MPC · JPL
735686	2015 KG_{135}	—	May 12, 2015	Mount Lemmon	Mount Lemmon Survey	·	2.2 km	MPC · JPL
735687	2015 KP_{142}	—	November 3, 2007	Kitt Peak	Spacewatch	·	1.9 km	MPC · JPL
735688	2015 KL_{147}	—	October 2, 2008	Mount Lemmon	Mount Lemmon Survey	·	1.6 km	MPC · JPL
735689	2015 KT_{147}	—	April 20, 2010	WISE	WISE	·	2.4 km	MPC · JPL
735690	2015 KF_{148}	—	December 25, 2005	Mount Lemmon	Mount Lemmon Survey	PHO	2.7 km	MPC · JPL
735691	2015 KE_{150}	—	February 17, 2010	WISE	WISE	·	1.8 km	MPC · JPL
735692	2015 KK_{152}	—	March 22, 2015	Haleakala	Pan-STARRS 1	·	1.1 km	MPC · JPL
735693	2015 KS_{152}	—	May 25, 2015	Haleakala	Pan-STARRS 1	·	3.2 km	MPC · JPL
735694	2015 KF_{153}	—	March 27, 2015	Haleakala	Pan-STARRS 1	·	1.3 km	MPC · JPL
735695	2015 KN_{153}	—	June 2, 2010	WISE	WISE	·	1.7 km	MPC · JPL
735696	2015 KW_{153}	—	December 26, 2013	Mount Lemmon	Mount Lemmon Survey	·	1.6 km	MPC · JPL
735697	2015 KK_{155}	—	April 15, 2004	Apache Point	SDSS Collaboration	EUP	4.6 km	MPC · JPL
735698	2015 KD_{156}	—	March 26, 2003	Kitt Peak	Spacewatch	EUP	2.7 km	MPC · JPL
735699	2015 KC_{159}	—	February 1, 2006	Kitt Peak	Spacewatch	·	1.0 km	MPC · JPL
735700	2015 KR_{160}	—	February 10, 2011	Mount Lemmon	Mount Lemmon Survey	·	910 m	MPC · JPL

== 735701–735800 ==
back to top

Designation			Discovery			Properties		Ref
Permanent	Provisional	Named after	Date	Site	Discoverer(s)	Category	Diam.	Ref
735701	2015 KG_{165}	—	May 28, 2010	WISE	WISE	T_{j} (2.99) · (895)	3.3 km	MPC · JPL
735702	2015 KJ_{165}	—	August 7, 2010	WISE	WISE	·	3.1 km	MPC · JPL
735703	2015 KL_{165}	—	April 19, 2010	WISE	WISE	·	2.7 km	MPC · JPL
735704	2015 KP_{165}	—	June 12, 2010	WISE	WISE	·	2.6 km	MPC · JPL
735705	2015 KO_{167}	—	May 18, 2015	Mount Lemmon	Mount Lemmon Survey	·	1.1 km	MPC · JPL
735706	2015 KT_{187}	—	May 20, 2015	Mount Lemmon	Mount Lemmon Survey	MAR	740 m	MPC · JPL
735707	2015 KE_{195}	—	May 21, 2015	Haleakala	Pan-STARRS 1	·	1.1 km	MPC · JPL
735708	2015 KR_{209}	—	January 31, 2009	Mount Lemmon	Mount Lemmon Survey	EOS	1.5 km	MPC · JPL
735709	2015 KF_{210}	—	May 25, 2015	Haleakala	Pan-STARRS 1	·	920 m	MPC · JPL
735710	2015 LE	—	January 26, 2012	Haleakala	Pan-STARRS 1	H	420 m	MPC · JPL
735711	2015 LM	—	April 19, 2002	Kitt Peak	Spacewatch	ADE	2.1 km	MPC · JPL
735712	2015 LT	—	June 22, 2010	Mount Lemmon	Mount Lemmon Survey	·	2.4 km	MPC · JPL
735713	2015 LS_{1}	—	November 20, 2008	Mount Lemmon	Mount Lemmon Survey	EUP	3.4 km	MPC · JPL
735714	2015 LE_{3}	—	March 30, 2010	WISE	WISE	·	3.0 km	MPC · JPL
735715	2015 LP_{5}	—	February 1, 2006	Kitt Peak	Spacewatch	·	1.4 km	MPC · JPL
735716	2015 LX_{5}	—	September 3, 2000	Apache Point	SDSS Collaboration	EOS	2.5 km	MPC · JPL
735717	2015 LT_{6}	—	November 8, 2008	Mount Lemmon	Mount Lemmon Survey	·	2.9 km	MPC · JPL
735718	2015 LE_{7}	—	January 10, 2008	Kitt Peak	Spacewatch	·	3.2 km	MPC · JPL
735719	2015 LM_{7}	—	April 20, 2010	WISE	WISE	URS	3.7 km	MPC · JPL
735720	2015 LU_{7}	—	September 24, 2008	Mount Lemmon	Mount Lemmon Survey	·	2.0 km	MPC · JPL
735721	2015 LY_{7}	—	July 21, 2011	Haleakala	Pan-STARRS 1	·	1.1 km	MPC · JPL
735722	2015 LS_{10}	—	September 28, 2003	Anderson Mesa	LONEOS	·	1.4 km	MPC · JPL
735723	2015 LA_{11}	—	October 15, 2007	Kitt Peak	Spacewatch	·	1.4 km	MPC · JPL
735724	2015 LV_{11}	—	June 13, 2010	WISE	WISE	(7605)	3.7 km	MPC · JPL
735725	2015 LZ_{12}	—	May 14, 2009	Kitt Peak	Spacewatch	·	2.6 km	MPC · JPL
735726	2015 LA_{13}	—	May 9, 2010	WISE	WISE	·	3.8 km	MPC · JPL
735727	2015 LX_{13}	—	February 26, 2014	Haleakala	Pan-STARRS 1	·	2.8 km	MPC · JPL
735728	2015 LU_{14}	—	March 30, 2009	Mount Lemmon	Mount Lemmon Survey	(58892)	4.0 km	MPC · JPL
735729	2015 LO_{15}	—	June 11, 2015	Haleakala	Pan-STARRS 1	EUN	970 m	MPC · JPL
735730	2015 LY_{15}	—	June 18, 2004	Socorro	LINEAR	·	4.1 km	MPC · JPL
735731	2015 LC_{16}	—	April 29, 2010	WISE	WISE	EUP	3.4 km	MPC · JPL
735732	2015 LC_{17}	—	January 1, 2008	Mount Lemmon	Mount Lemmon Survey	·	3.0 km	MPC · JPL
735733	2015 LJ_{18}	—	May 1, 2010	WISE	WISE	KON	2.6 km	MPC · JPL
735734	2015 LH_{19}	—	May 4, 2005	Mount Lemmon	Mount Lemmon Survey	·	600 m	MPC · JPL
735735	2015 LJ_{22}	—	February 2, 2008	Catalina	CSS	T_{j} (2.99)	5.3 km	MPC · JPL
735736	2015 LZ_{23}	—	March 21, 2015	Haleakala	Pan-STARRS 1	·	1.1 km	MPC · JPL
735737	2015 LF_{26}	—	June 10, 2015	Haleakala	Pan-STARRS 1	TIR	2.5 km	MPC · JPL
735738	2015 LH_{26}	—	November 20, 2008	Mount Lemmon	Mount Lemmon Survey	·	1.4 km	MPC · JPL
735739	2015 LH_{27}	—	June 16, 2010	Kitt Peak	Spacewatch	BRA	1.7 km	MPC · JPL
735740	2015 LG_{29}	—	August 31, 2005	Kitt Peak	Spacewatch	·	2.4 km	MPC · JPL
735741	2015 LM_{29}	—	March 19, 2010	Catalina	CSS	·	1.4 km	MPC · JPL
735742	2015 LY_{29}	—	June 13, 2015	Haleakala	Pan-STARRS 1	·	1.4 km	MPC · JPL
735743	2015 LX_{30}	—	April 1, 2003	Apache Point	SDSS Collaboration	·	4.0 km	MPC · JPL
735744	2015 LY_{30}	—	April 30, 2010	WISE	WISE	·	2.9 km	MPC · JPL
735745	2015 LM_{32}	—	June 2, 2010	WISE	WISE	·	3.7 km	MPC · JPL
735746	2015 LK_{36}	—	March 22, 2009	Catalina	CSS	·	2.7 km	MPC · JPL
735747	2015 LM_{36}	—	June 5, 2010	WISE	WISE	·	1.5 km	MPC · JPL
735748	2015 LW_{42}	—	June 12, 2015	Haleakala	Pan-STARRS 1	EUN	1.1 km	MPC · JPL
735749	2015 LT_{43}	—	July 1, 2010	WISE	WISE	·	1.6 km	MPC · JPL
735750	2015 LS_{46}	—	June 26, 2010	WISE	WISE	·	3.3 km	MPC · JPL
735751	2015 LX_{46}	—	March 6, 2009	Cerro Burek	I. de la Cueva	·	2.1 km	MPC · JPL
735752	2015 LT_{58}	—	June 15, 2015	Haleakala	Pan-STARRS 1	MAR	730 m	MPC · JPL
735753	2015 MZ_{1}	—	April 11, 2003	Kitt Peak	Spacewatch	·	1.6 km	MPC · JPL
735754	2015 MV_{2}	—	August 30, 2011	Haleakala	Pan-STARRS 1	·	1.5 km	MPC · JPL
735755	2015 MV_{3}	—	December 20, 2007	Mount Lemmon	Mount Lemmon Survey	·	2.0 km	MPC · JPL
735756	2015 MB_{4}	—	January 12, 1996	Kitt Peak	Spacewatch	·	2.9 km	MPC · JPL
735757	2015 ML_{4}	—	June 12, 2010	WISE	WISE	·	4.1 km	MPC · JPL
735758	2015 MP_{4}	—	October 14, 2007	Catalina	CSS	·	1.4 km	MPC · JPL
735759	2015 MP_{9}	—	February 13, 2007	Mount Lemmon	Mount Lemmon Survey	·	3.3 km	MPC · JPL
735760	2015 MM_{11}	—	June 20, 2002	Palomar	NEAT	·	1.5 km	MPC · JPL
735761	2015 MC_{13}	—	December 20, 2009	Mount Lemmon	Mount Lemmon Survey	·	1.5 km	MPC · JPL
735762	2015 MN_{14}	—	September 25, 2007	Mount Lemmon	Mount Lemmon Survey	·	1.6 km	MPC · JPL
735763	2015 MO_{15}	—	September 22, 2003	Palomar	NEAT	·	1.6 km	MPC · JPL
735764	2015 ME_{17}	—	April 2, 2009	Mount Lemmon	Mount Lemmon Survey	·	2.7 km	MPC · JPL
735765	2015 MO_{20}	—	October 17, 2012	Mount Lemmon	Mount Lemmon Survey	·	1.3 km	MPC · JPL
735766	2015 MG_{24}	—	November 19, 2009	Mount Lemmon	Mount Lemmon Survey	·	1.2 km	MPC · JPL
735767	2015 ML_{27}	—	January 6, 2010	Mount Lemmon	Mount Lemmon Survey	·	1.4 km	MPC · JPL
735768	2015 MO_{27}	—	January 23, 2014	Mount Lemmon	Mount Lemmon Survey	·	1.2 km	MPC · JPL
735769	2015 MD_{28}	—	February 16, 2010	WISE	WISE	NAE	2.7 km	MPC · JPL
735770	2015 MN_{29}	—	February 3, 2009	Kitt Peak	Spacewatch	·	1.9 km	MPC · JPL
735771	2015 MV_{36}	—	October 5, 2002	Apache Point	SDSS Collaboration	·	1.8 km	MPC · JPL
735772	2015 MK_{37}	—	June 18, 2015	Haleakala	Pan-STARRS 1	EOS	1.4 km	MPC · JPL
735773	2015 MO_{38}	—	March 31, 2015	Haleakala	Pan-STARRS 1	·	2.4 km	MPC · JPL
735774	2015 MB_{40}	—	June 12, 2004	Kitt Peak	Spacewatch	·	2.3 km	MPC · JPL
735775	2015 MU_{41}	—	May 22, 2015	Haleakala	Pan-STARRS 1	·	2.1 km	MPC · JPL
735776	2015 ME_{46}	—	September 4, 2011	Haleakala	Pan-STARRS 1	·	1.5 km	MPC · JPL
735777	2015 MT_{48}	—	June 30, 2010	WISE	WISE	·	2.1 km	MPC · JPL
735778	2015 MX_{48}	—	October 22, 2005	Catalina	CSS	·	4.9 km	MPC · JPL
735779	2015 MF_{49}	—	July 28, 2011	Siding Spring	SSS	·	1.3 km	MPC · JPL
735780	2015 ML_{53}	—	June 12, 2010	WISE	WISE	·	1.3 km	MPC · JPL
735781	2015 MW_{54}	—	July 4, 2005	Mount Lemmon	Mount Lemmon Survey	·	3.8 km	MPC · JPL
735782	2015 MN_{55}	—	May 20, 2015	Kitt Peak	Spacewatch	PHO	710 m	MPC · JPL
735783	2015 MO_{55}	—	September 11, 2005	Kitt Peak	Spacewatch	·	3.2 km	MPC · JPL
735784	2015 MY_{57}	—	July 26, 2006	Palomar	NEAT	·	2.5 km	MPC · JPL
735785	2015 MF_{58}	—	July 22, 2010	WISE	WISE	·	1.6 km	MPC · JPL
735786	2015 MQ_{60}	—	September 12, 2005	Kitt Peak	Spacewatch	·	570 m	MPC · JPL
735787	2015 MX_{60}	—	December 14, 2003	Kitt Peak	Spacewatch	·	2.1 km	MPC · JPL
735788	2015 MA_{61}	—	February 25, 2010	WISE	WISE	·	1.7 km	MPC · JPL
735789	2015 MH_{62}	—	June 9, 2010	WISE	WISE	·	2.4 km	MPC · JPL
735790	2015 MQ_{62}	—	January 10, 2013	Haleakala	Pan-STARRS 1	·	1.7 km	MPC · JPL
735791	2015 MV_{65}	—	August 7, 2004	Campo Imperatore	CINEOS	·	3.2 km	MPC · JPL
735792	2015 MZ_{65}	—	September 22, 2003	Palomar	NEAT	·	1.3 km	MPC · JPL
735793	2015 MV_{68}	—	June 13, 2015	Haleakala	Pan-STARRS 1	·	1.5 km	MPC · JPL
735794	2015 MZ_{68}	—	February 20, 2009	Dauban	C. Rinner, Kugel, F.	·	3.9 km	MPC · JPL
735795	2015 MG_{70}	—	June 18, 2015	Haleakala	Pan-STARRS 1	·	1.2 km	MPC · JPL
735796	2015 MP_{70}	—	June 18, 2015	Haleakala	Pan-STARRS 1	·	2.2 km	MPC · JPL
735797	2015 MN_{71}	—	December 27, 2006	Mount Lemmon	Mount Lemmon Survey	·	3.3 km	MPC · JPL
735798	2015 MX_{71}	—	May 18, 2010	WISE	WISE	·	1.2 km	MPC · JPL
735799	2015 ML_{72}	—	June 22, 2015	Haleakala	Pan-STARRS 1	·	1.3 km	MPC · JPL
735800	2015 MQ_{72}	—	December 1, 2008	Mount Lemmon	Mount Lemmon Survey	EUN	930 m	MPC · JPL

== 735801–735900 ==
back to top

Designation			Discovery			Properties		Ref
Permanent	Provisional	Named after	Date	Site	Discoverer(s)	Category	Diam.	Ref
735801	2015 ML_{77}	—	August 4, 2004	Palomar	NEAT	TIR	2.4 km	MPC · JPL
735802	2015 MY_{83}	—	June 27, 2010	WISE	WISE	·	3.1 km	MPC · JPL
735803	2015 MQ_{85}	—	July 12, 2010	WISE	WISE	·	2.7 km	MPC · JPL
735804	2015 MS_{85}	—	September 9, 2007	Kitt Peak	Spacewatch	(5)	970 m	MPC · JPL
735805	2015 MZ_{86}	—	June 13, 2015	Haleakala	Pan-STARRS 1	·	1.3 km	MPC · JPL
735806	2015 MG_{89}	—	September 12, 2001	Kitt Peak	Spacewatch	KOR	1.1 km	MPC · JPL
735807	2015 MF_{90}	—	November 15, 1999	Kitt Peak	Spacewatch	·	3.4 km	MPC · JPL
735808	2015 MG_{90}	—	May 19, 2010	WISE	WISE	·	1.9 km	MPC · JPL
735809	2015 MM_{90}	—	April 19, 2006	Kitt Peak	Spacewatch	·	980 m	MPC · JPL
735810	2015 MQ_{92}	—	April 6, 2010	Kitt Peak	Spacewatch	·	2.4 km	MPC · JPL
735811	2015 MA_{93}	—	January 15, 2007	Mauna Kea	P. A. Wiegert	·	3.2 km	MPC · JPL
735812	2015 MN_{93}	—	June 11, 2004	Palomar	NEAT	·	2.2 km	MPC · JPL
735813	2015 MV_{93}	—	April 11, 2010	WISE	WISE	·	2.6 km	MPC · JPL
735814	2015 MR_{94}	—	January 15, 2008	Mount Lemmon	Mount Lemmon Survey	·	3.0 km	MPC · JPL
735815	2015 MZ_{95}	—	May 7, 2014	Haleakala	Pan-STARRS 1	EUN	1.1 km	MPC · JPL
735816	2015 MK_{97}	—	September 22, 2003	Kitt Peak	Spacewatch	·	1.1 km	MPC · JPL
735817	2015 MF_{98}	—	October 17, 2012	Haleakala	Pan-STARRS 1	·	990 m	MPC · JPL
735818	2015 ME_{99}	—	June 23, 2015	Haleakala	Pan-STARRS 1	·	2.3 km	MPC · JPL
735819	2015 MC_{100}	—	March 10, 2002	Bohyunsan	Y.-B. Jeon, H. Lee	EUP	4.8 km	MPC · JPL
735820	2015 MJ_{105}	—	May 22, 2010	WISE	WISE	EMA	2.7 km	MPC · JPL
735821	2015 MC_{108}	—	January 11, 2010	Kitt Peak	Spacewatch	·	1.2 km	MPC · JPL
735822	2015 MB_{112}	—	January 27, 2011	Kitt Peak	Spacewatch	·	700 m	MPC · JPL
735823	2015 MP_{113}	—	September 18, 2003	Kitt Peak	Spacewatch	·	1.4 km	MPC · JPL
735824	2015 MW_{116}	—	July 25, 2010	WISE	WISE	·	1.5 km	MPC · JPL
735825	2015 MD_{117}	—	January 24, 2014	Haleakala	Pan-STARRS 1	·	950 m	MPC · JPL
735826	2015 MK_{117}	—	May 17, 2010	WISE	WISE	·	3.5 km	MPC · JPL
735827	2015 MC_{120}	—	October 20, 1993	La Silla	E. W. Elst	·	1.8 km	MPC · JPL
735828	2015 MJ_{122}	—	July 25, 2010	WISE	WISE	T_{j} (2.99)	3.2 km	MPC · JPL
735829	2015 MM_{125}	—	December 19, 2007	Mount Lemmon	Mount Lemmon Survey	·	4.0 km	MPC · JPL
735830	2015 MB_{128}	—	February 17, 2010	Kitt Peak	Spacewatch	·	1.1 km	MPC · JPL
735831	2015 MH_{128}	—	October 8, 2005	Catalina	CSS	·	3.3 km	MPC · JPL
735832	2015 MH_{134}	—	September 19, 2011	Haleakala	Pan-STARRS 1	·	1.3 km	MPC · JPL
735833	2015 MK_{134}	—	June 26, 2015	Haleakala	Pan-STARRS 1	·	980 m	MPC · JPL
735834	2015 MS_{134}	—	June 22, 2015	Haleakala	Pan-STARRS 1	V	520 m	MPC · JPL
735835	2015 MY_{134}	—	January 10, 2013	Haleakala	Pan-STARRS 1	·	1.2 km	MPC · JPL
735836	2015 MS_{136}	—	November 16, 2003	Kitt Peak	Spacewatch	·	1.0 km	MPC · JPL
735837	2015 MX_{136}	—	April 23, 2014	Cerro Tololo-DECam	DECam	·	1.1 km	MPC · JPL
735838	2015 MT_{137}	—	April 4, 2014	Kitt Peak	Spacewatch	·	1.4 km	MPC · JPL
735839	2015 MW_{137}	—	January 5, 2013	Mount Lemmon	Mount Lemmon Survey	·	1.5 km	MPC · JPL
735840	2015 MG_{138}	—	November 7, 2008	Kitt Peak	Spacewatch	·	1.1 km	MPC · JPL
735841	2015 MH_{138}	—	June 26, 2015	Haleakala	Pan-STARRS 1	KOR	1.1 km	MPC · JPL
735842	2015 ML_{138}	—	October 17, 2003	Kitt Peak	Spacewatch	·	1.4 km	MPC · JPL
735843	2015 MV_{138}	—	February 10, 2013	Oukaïmeden	M. Ory	EUN	970 m	MPC · JPL
735844	2015 MW_{138}	—	January 16, 2013	Mount Lemmon	Mount Lemmon Survey	·	1.5 km	MPC · JPL
735845	2015 MC_{139}	—	December 2, 2012	Mount Lemmon	Mount Lemmon Survey	EUN	970 m	MPC · JPL
735846	2015 MX_{140}	—	January 25, 2009	Kitt Peak	Spacewatch	·	1.3 km	MPC · JPL
735847	2015 MA_{143}	—	October 9, 2007	Kitt Peak	Spacewatch	·	1.2 km	MPC · JPL
735848	2015 ME_{144}	—	March 13, 2013	Mount Lemmon	Mount Lemmon Survey	·	2.6 km	MPC · JPL
735849	2015 MH_{144}	—	May 23, 2006	Kitt Peak	Spacewatch	·	1.2 km	MPC · JPL
735850	2015 MV_{144}	—	June 25, 2015	Haleakala	Pan-STARRS 1	·	1.1 km	MPC · JPL
735851	2015 MY_{144}	—	September 23, 2011	Kitt Peak	Spacewatch	·	1.4 km	MPC · JPL
735852	2015 MO_{145}	—	November 2, 2007	Mount Lemmon	Mount Lemmon Survey	·	1.3 km	MPC · JPL
735853	2015 MP_{145}	—	October 15, 2007	Kitt Peak	Spacewatch	·	1.2 km	MPC · JPL
735854	2015 MS_{145}	—	August 10, 2007	Kitt Peak	Spacewatch	·	980 m	MPC · JPL
735855	2015 MP_{147}	—	June 27, 2015	Haleakala	Pan-STARRS 2	·	890 m	MPC · JPL
735856	2015 ML_{149}	—	June 28, 2015	Haleakala	Pan-STARRS 1	·	980 m	MPC · JPL
735857	2015 MK_{150}	—	January 4, 2013	Cerro Tololo-DECam	DECam	ADE	1.5 km	MPC · JPL
735858	2015 MK_{163}	—	June 26, 2015	Haleakala	Pan-STARRS 1	(12739)	1.1 km	MPC · JPL
735859	2015 ME_{185}	—	June 19, 2015	Haleakala	Pan-STARRS 1	ARM	2.5 km	MPC · JPL
735860	2015 MO_{187}	—	June 20, 2015	Haleakala	Pan-STARRS 1	·	1.7 km	MPC · JPL
735861	2015 MT_{195}	—	June 27, 2015	Haleakala	Pan-STARRS 1	·	1.2 km	MPC · JPL
735862	2015 MU_{199}	—	June 23, 2015	Haleakala	Pan-STARRS 1	3:2	4.2 km	MPC · JPL
735863	2015 MR_{200}	—	November 10, 2010	Mount Lemmon	Mount Lemmon Survey	·	2.7 km	MPC · JPL
735864	2015 NY_{1}	—	February 8, 2002	Kitt Peak	Deep Ecliptic Survey	·	3.2 km	MPC · JPL
735865	2015 NT_{3}	—	June 13, 2010	WISE	WISE	·	4.4 km	MPC · JPL
735866	2015 NY_{3}	—	February 17, 2010	Kitt Peak	Spacewatch	·	1.2 km	MPC · JPL
735867	2015 NN_{4}	—	April 23, 2009	Catalina	CSS	T_{j} (2.98)	3.4 km	MPC · JPL
735868	2015 NU_{5}	—	July 17, 2010	WISE	WISE	·	2.9 km	MPC · JPL
735869	2015 NR_{6}	—	April 29, 2014	Haleakala	Pan-STARRS 1	·	1.2 km	MPC · JPL
735870	2015 NA_{7}	—	May 23, 2010	WISE	WISE	EMA	2.7 km	MPC · JPL
735871	2015 NV_{8}	—	July 9, 2015	Haleakala	Pan-STARRS 1	·	2.0 km	MPC · JPL
735872	2015 NJ_{9}	—	October 10, 2007	Kitt Peak	Spacewatch	·	1.2 km	MPC · JPL
735873	2015 NK_{10}	—	December 31, 2013	Haleakala	Pan-STARRS 1	·	2.5 km	MPC · JPL
735874	2015 NP_{11}	—	December 8, 2008	Mount Lemmon	Mount Lemmon Survey	·	1.0 km	MPC · JPL
735875	2015 NZ_{12}	—	March 24, 2003	Kitt Peak	Spacewatch	LIX	3.0 km	MPC · JPL
735876	2015 NA_{13}	—	May 25, 2015	Haleakala	Pan-STARRS 1	·	2.5 km	MPC · JPL
735877	2015 NM_{14}	—	August 8, 2004	Palomar	NEAT	T_{j} (2.98) · EUP	4.6 km	MPC · JPL
735878	2015 NV_{15}	—	March 24, 2001	Anderson Mesa	LONEOS	JUN	1.0 km	MPC · JPL
735879	2015 NG_{16}	—	July 12, 2015	Haleakala	Pan-STARRS 1	·	1.2 km	MPC · JPL
735880	2015 NB_{17}	—	January 16, 2013	Haleakala	Pan-STARRS 1	·	1.3 km	MPC · JPL
735881	2015 NZ_{18}	—	September 29, 2005	Kitt Peak	Spacewatch	·	2.4 km	MPC · JPL
735882	2015 NG_{20}	—	May 13, 2010	WISE	WISE	·	1.3 km	MPC · JPL
735883	2015 NT_{20}	—	September 1, 2005	Palomar	NEAT	·	2.4 km	MPC · JPL
735884	2015 NN_{24}	—	July 11, 2001	Palomar	NEAT	·	2.1 km	MPC · JPL
735885	2015 NQ_{24}	—	October 1, 2003	Kitt Peak	Spacewatch	·	1.2 km	MPC · JPL
735886	2015 NX_{24}	—	September 23, 2011	Kitt Peak	Spacewatch	·	1.2 km	MPC · JPL
735887	2015 NY_{26}	—	October 22, 2011	Kitt Peak	Spacewatch	KOR	1.1 km	MPC · JPL
735888	2015 NX_{27}	—	January 13, 2004	Kitt Peak	Spacewatch	·	1.4 km	MPC · JPL
735889	2015 NU_{28}	—	June 9, 2010	WISE	WISE	·	2.8 km	MPC · JPL
735890	2015 NZ_{31}	—	July 12, 2015	Haleakala	Pan-STARRS 1	·	700 m	MPC · JPL
735891	2015 NQ_{39}	—	March 3, 2013	Mount Lemmon	Mount Lemmon Survey	·	1.4 km	MPC · JPL
735892	2015 ON_{1}	—	February 28, 2014	Mount Lemmon	Mount Lemmon Survey	EUN	1.1 km	MPC · JPL
735893	2015 OV_{1}	—	March 31, 2003	Apache Point	SDSS Collaboration	·	2.9 km	MPC · JPL
735894	2015 OX_{1}	—	March 23, 2003	Apache Point	SDSS Collaboration	·	2.6 km	MPC · JPL
735895	2015 OL_{4}	—	August 24, 2005	Palomar	NEAT	EOS	2.2 km	MPC · JPL
735896	2015 OX_{4}	—	November 6, 2012	Kitt Peak	Spacewatch	·	1.6 km	MPC · JPL
735897	2015 OF_{5}	—	September 20, 2003	Kitt Peak	Spacewatch	·	1.3 km	MPC · JPL
735898	2015 OS_{5}	—	March 25, 2006	Palomar	NEAT	BRG	1.5 km	MPC · JPL
735899	2015 OA_{7}	—	June 8, 2010	WISE	WISE	·	3.7 km	MPC · JPL
735900	2015 OH_{7}	—	February 12, 2008	Mount Lemmon	Mount Lemmon Survey	·	2.6 km	MPC · JPL

== 735901–736000 ==
back to top

Designation			Discovery			Properties		Ref
Permanent	Provisional	Named after	Date	Site	Discoverer(s)	Category	Diam.	Ref
735901	2015 OW_{10}	—	November 16, 2003	Kitt Peak	Spacewatch	·	1.3 km	MPC · JPL
735902	2015 OJ_{12}	—	December 29, 2008	Mount Lemmon	Mount Lemmon Survey	·	1.2 km	MPC · JPL
735903	2015 ON_{14}	—	February 6, 2003	Kitt Peak	Spacewatch	NYS	1.3 km	MPC · JPL
735904	2015 OB_{16}	—	September 8, 2011	Haleakala	Pan-STARRS 1	·	1.4 km	MPC · JPL
735905	2015 OD_{16}	—	April 15, 2010	Kitt Peak	Spacewatch	·	1.4 km	MPC · JPL
735906	2015 OP_{17}	—	December 20, 2009	Mount Lemmon	Mount Lemmon Survey	·	1.3 km	MPC · JPL
735907	2015 OW_{17}	—	January 16, 2013	Haleakala	Pan-STARRS 1	·	1.4 km	MPC · JPL
735908	2015 OG_{18}	—	August 23, 2004	Kitt Peak	Spacewatch	VER	2.5 km	MPC · JPL
735909	2015 OF_{19}	—	July 18, 2015	Haleakala	Pan-STARRS 1	·	1.4 km	MPC · JPL
735910	2015 ON_{19}	—	July 20, 2002	Palomar	NEAT	EUN	1.1 km	MPC · JPL
735911	2015 OM_{20}	—	December 7, 1999	Kitt Peak	Spacewatch	EUN	920 m	MPC · JPL
735912	2015 OL_{23}	—	April 26, 2010	WISE	WISE	BRA	2.2 km	MPC · JPL
735913	2015 OX_{23}	—	June 12, 2010	WISE	WISE	·	1.3 km	MPC · JPL
735914	2015 OE_{25}	—	July 30, 2010	WISE	WISE	·	3.1 km	MPC · JPL
735915	2015 OU_{28}	—	July 23, 2015	Haleakala	Pan-STARRS 1	EOS	1.5 km	MPC · JPL
735916	2015 OA_{31}	—	February 9, 2003	Palomar	NEAT	PHO	3.0 km	MPC · JPL
735917	2015 OL_{31}	—	September 4, 2004	Palomar	NEAT	TIR	2.7 km	MPC · JPL
735918	2015 OS_{33}	—	October 1, 2005	Catalina	CSS	·	3.7 km	MPC · JPL
735919	2015 OS_{34}	—	August 5, 2005	Palomar	NEAT	·	4.0 km	MPC · JPL
735920	2015 OA_{36}	—	June 25, 2015	Haleakala	Pan-STARRS 1	·	850 m	MPC · JPL
735921	2015 OD_{36}	—	October 22, 2011	Mount Lemmon	Mount Lemmon Survey	·	1.5 km	MPC · JPL
735922	2015 OM_{37}	—	September 12, 2004	Stony Ridge	Stony Ridge	·	3.0 km	MPC · JPL
735923	2015 OX_{37}	—	January 13, 2013	ESA OGS	ESA OGS	·	1.0 km	MPC · JPL
735924	2015 OJ_{38}	—	October 16, 1999	Apache Point	SDSS	·	920 m	MPC · JPL
735925	2015 OV_{38}	—	June 2, 2015	Cerro Tololo-DECam	DECam	·	1.2 km	MPC · JPL
735926	2015 OW_{38}	—	January 18, 2013	Haleakala	Pan-STARRS 1	·	1.6 km	MPC · JPL
735927	2015 OQ_{40}	—	July 17, 2004	Cerro Tololo	Deep Ecliptic Survey	·	3.4 km	MPC · JPL
735928	2015 OD_{43}	—	August 10, 2007	Kitt Peak	Spacewatch	·	1.1 km	MPC · JPL
735929	2015 OW_{44}	—	June 15, 2015	Haleakala	Pan-STARRS 1	HNS	830 m	MPC · JPL
735930	2015 OL_{47}	—	April 24, 2006	Anderson Mesa	LONEOS	ADE	2.5 km	MPC · JPL
735931	2015 OB_{48}	—	October 10, 2002	Apache Point	SDSS Collaboration	·	2.2 km	MPC · JPL
735932	2015 OX_{48}	—	July 26, 2015	Haleakala	Pan-STARRS 1	·	1.9 km	MPC · JPL
735933	2015 OA_{51}	—	July 26, 2015	Haleakala	Pan-STARRS 1	EOS	1.5 km	MPC · JPL
735934	2015 OJ_{52}	—	July 21, 2010	WISE	WISE	·	4.5 km	MPC · JPL
735935	2015 OP_{53}	—	April 24, 2014	Haleakala	Pan-STARRS 1	·	1.6 km	MPC · JPL
735936	2015 OV_{54}	—	September 23, 2011	Haleakala	Pan-STARRS 1	·	1.5 km	MPC · JPL
735937	2015 OO_{55}	—	October 20, 2007	Mount Lemmon	Mount Lemmon Survey	·	2.1 km	MPC · JPL
735938	2015 OX_{55}	—	March 19, 2009	Kitt Peak	Spacewatch	·	2.9 km	MPC · JPL
735939	2015 OL_{56}	—	May 4, 2014	Haleakala	Pan-STARRS 1	MAR	1.1 km	MPC · JPL
735940	2015 OE_{60}	—	February 28, 2014	Haleakala	Pan-STARRS 1	EOS	1.8 km	MPC · JPL
735941	2015 OF_{60}	—	June 25, 2010	WISE	WISE	·	2.6 km	MPC · JPL
735942	2015 OE_{64}	—	July 21, 2010	WISE	WISE	·	2.7 km	MPC · JPL
735943	2015 ON_{65}	—	September 1, 2005	Palomar	NEAT	·	1.4 km	MPC · JPL
735944	2015 OP_{65}	—	October 16, 2002	Palomar	NEAT	ADE	2.1 km	MPC · JPL
735945	2015 OZ_{65}	—	September 11, 2002	Palomar	NEAT	·	1.9 km	MPC · JPL
735946	2015 OH_{74}	—	August 24, 2006	Socorro	LINEAR	·	2.0 km	MPC · JPL
735947	2015 OK_{74}	—	October 18, 2011	Kitt Peak	Spacewatch	·	1.4 km	MPC · JPL
735948	2015 OF_{75}	—	July 25, 2015	Haleakala	Pan-STARRS 1	·	1.4 km	MPC · JPL
735949	2015 OP_{75}	—	September 25, 2003	Palomar	NEAT	·	2.1 km	MPC · JPL
735950	2015 OR_{77}	—	October 8, 2008	Mount Lemmon	Mount Lemmon Survey	V	710 m	MPC · JPL
735951	2015 OR_{84}	—	September 2, 2011	Haleakala	Pan-STARRS 1	·	1.3 km	MPC · JPL
735952	2015 OW_{84}	—	September 28, 2011	Mount Lemmon	Mount Lemmon Survey	·	1.4 km	MPC · JPL
735953	2015 OY_{84}	—	September 28, 2011	Mount Lemmon	Mount Lemmon Survey	(12739)	1.3 km	MPC · JPL
735954	2015 OZ_{84}	—	April 29, 2014	Haleakala	Pan-STARRS 1	·	1.5 km	MPC · JPL
735955	2015 ON_{85}	—	July 25, 2015	Haleakala	Pan-STARRS 1	·	910 m	MPC · JPL
735956	2015 OW_{86}	—	December 4, 2007	Catalina	CSS	·	1.9 km	MPC · JPL
735957	2015 OJ_{87}	—	July 25, 2015	Haleakala	Pan-STARRS 1	·	900 m	MPC · JPL
735958	2015 OF_{89}	—	July 25, 2015	Haleakala	Pan-STARRS 1	·	650 m	MPC · JPL
735959	2015 OH_{89}	—	January 7, 2013	Kitt Peak	Spacewatch	·	1.5 km	MPC · JPL
735960	2015 OJ_{89}	—	December 22, 2012	Haleakala	Pan-STARRS 1	·	1.4 km	MPC · JPL
735961	2015 OS_{89}	—	July 24, 2015	Haleakala	Pan-STARRS 1	·	1.2 km	MPC · JPL
735962	2015 OR_{91}	—	July 19, 2015	Haleakala	Pan-STARRS 1	·	1.1 km	MPC · JPL
735963	2015 OB_{92}	—	September 22, 2003	Kitt Peak	Spacewatch	·	1.0 km	MPC · JPL
735964	2015 OX_{92}	—	July 3, 2010	WISE	WISE	·	990 m	MPC · JPL
735965	2015 OX_{93}	—	May 23, 2014	Haleakala	Pan-STARRS 1	EOS	1.5 km	MPC · JPL
735966	2015 OZ_{93}	—	December 5, 2007	Kitt Peak	Spacewatch	·	1.3 km	MPC · JPL
735967	2015 OZ_{94}	—	January 10, 2013	Haleakala	Pan-STARRS 1	MAR	860 m	MPC · JPL
735968	2015 OF_{96}	—	January 31, 2006	Kitt Peak	Spacewatch	·	1.2 km	MPC · JPL
735969	2015 OG_{96}	—	August 28, 2006	Kitt Peak	Spacewatch	·	1.4 km	MPC · JPL
735970	2015 OH_{98}	—	February 12, 2008	Kitt Peak	Spacewatch	KOR	1.1 km	MPC · JPL
735971	2015 OG_{99}	—	October 11, 2007	Kitt Peak	Spacewatch	·	1.2 km	MPC · JPL
735972	2015 OG_{100}	—	December 19, 2007	Mount Lemmon	Mount Lemmon Survey	·	1.6 km	MPC · JPL
735973	2015 OR_{102}	—	September 29, 1995	Kitt Peak	Spacewatch	·	2.4 km	MPC · JPL
735974	2015 OR_{103}	—	March 25, 2010	Kitt Peak	Spacewatch	·	1.3 km	MPC · JPL
735975	2015 OJ_{104}	—	September 2, 2011	Haleakala	Pan-STARRS 1	·	1.4 km	MPC · JPL
735976	2015 OX_{104}	—	January 21, 2013	Mount Lemmon	Mount Lemmon Survey	·	1.8 km	MPC · JPL
735977	2015 OQ_{105}	—	July 28, 2015	Haleakala	Pan-STARRS 1	MAR	860 m	MPC · JPL
735978	2015 OY_{128}	—	July 23, 2015	Haleakala	Pan-STARRS 1	·	1.5 km	MPC · JPL
735979	2015 OO_{136}	—	July 24, 2015	Haleakala	Pan-STARRS 1	·	1.4 km	MPC · JPL
735980	2015 OA_{138}	—	July 19, 2015	Haleakala	Pan-STARRS 1	·	1.6 km	MPC · JPL
735981	2015 ON_{138}	—	July 24, 2015	Haleakala	Pan-STARRS 1	AGN	960 m	MPC · JPL
735982	2015 OS_{139}	—	July 25, 2015	Haleakala	Pan-STARRS 1	·	1.5 km	MPC · JPL
735983	2015 OS_{140}	—	July 23, 2015	Haleakala	Pan-STARRS 1	·	1.5 km	MPC · JPL
735984	2015 OD_{141}	—	July 23, 2015	Haleakala	Pan-STARRS 1	·	1.5 km	MPC · JPL
735985	2015 OA_{142}	—	November 9, 2007	Kitt Peak	Spacewatch	·	1.3 km	MPC · JPL
735986	2015 OO_{145}	—	July 19, 2015	Haleakala	Pan-STARRS 1	·	840 m	MPC · JPL
735987	2015 OQ_{147}	—	May 20, 2014	Haleakala	Pan-STARRS 1	HOF	2.1 km	MPC · JPL
735988	2015 OU_{147}	—	July 24, 2015	Haleakala	Pan-STARRS 1	·	500 m	MPC · JPL
735989	2015 OF_{150}	—	July 25, 2015	Haleakala	Pan-STARRS 1	EUN	1.1 km	MPC · JPL
735990	2015 OA_{153}	—	July 19, 2015	Haleakala	Pan-STARRS 1	ELF	2.5 km	MPC · JPL
735991	2015 OY_{167}	—	July 25, 2015	Haleakala	Pan-STARRS 1	·	1.3 km	MPC · JPL
735992	2015 OY_{171}	—	January 3, 2014	Kitt Peak	Spacewatch	·	890 m	MPC · JPL
735993	2015 PZ	—	September 14, 1998	Socorro	LINEAR	(1547)	1.5 km	MPC · JPL
735994	2015 PU_{1}	—	November 17, 2006	Palomar	NEAT	·	2.6 km	MPC · JPL
735995	2015 PL_{3}	—	April 10, 2005	Kitt Peak	Deep Ecliptic Survey	·	2.3 km	MPC · JPL
735996	2015 PQ_{3}	—	August 15, 2004	Palomar	NEAT	·	3.2 km	MPC · JPL
735997	2015 PG_{4}	—	June 24, 2010	WISE	WISE	·	2.8 km	MPC · JPL
735998	2015 PS_{4}	—	January 12, 2010	Kitt Peak	Spacewatch	·	1.0 km	MPC · JPL
735999	2015 PM_{5}	—	June 29, 2015	Haleakala	Pan-STARRS 1	·	2.1 km	MPC · JPL
736000	2015 PG_{7}	—	May 13, 2010	WISE	WISE	EUP	3.1 km	MPC · JPL

back to top

== Meaning of names ==
As minor planet discoveries are confirmed, they are given a permanent number by the IAU's Minor Planet Center (MPC), and the discoverers can then submit names for them, following the IAU's naming conventions. The list below concerns those minor planets in the specified number-range that have received names, and explains the meanings of those names.

Official naming citations of newly named small Solar System bodies are approved and published in a bulletin by IAU's Working Group for Small Bodies Nomenclature (WGSBN). Before May 2021, citations were published in MPC's Minor Planet Circulars for many decades. Recent citations can also be found on the JPL Small-Body Database (SBDB). Until his death in 2016, German astronomer Lutz D. Schmadel compiled these citations into the Dictionary of Minor Planet Names (DMP) and regularly updated the collection.

Based on Paul Herget's The Names of the Minor Planets, Schmadel also researched the unclear origin of numerous asteroids, most of which had been named prior to World War II. This article incorporates text from this source, which is in the public domain: SBDB New namings may only be added to this list below after official publication as the preannouncement of names is condemned. The WGSBN publishes a comprehensive guideline for the naming rules of non-cometary small Solar System bodies.

Named minor planet	Provisional	This minor planet was named for...	Ref · Catalog
735177 Dinev	2015 FM_{10}	Ivaylo Dinev, Bulgarian dentist and amateur astronomer.	IAU · 735177
